= Mahmudi =

Mahmudi (Persian: محمودي) may refer to:

- Mahmudi (tribe) a 16th/17th-century Ottoman-Kurdish tribe
- Mahmudi, Band-e Zarak, a village in Minab County, Hormozgan Province, Iran
- Mahmudi, Howmeh, a village in Minab County, Hormozgan Province, Iran
- Mahmudi, Baft, a village in Kerman Province, Iran
- Mahmudi, Rafsanjan, a village in Kerman Province, Iran
- Mahmudi, North Khorasan, a village in Iran
- Mahmudi, Razavi Khorasan, a village in Iran
- Mahmudi, Sistan and Baluchesstan, a village in Iran
- Mahmudi, Yazd, a village in Iran
- Mahmudi (cloth), a fine cotton variety cloth produced in India
- Mahmoudi
- Özalp (District), Van

== See also ==
- Mahmud (disambiguation)
