= Mahmoudi =

Mahmoudi (Persian: محمودی; Arabic: محمودي) also spelled Mahmoodi or Mahmudi may refer to:

== Surname ==
- Baghdadi Mahmudi, Libyan politician
- Behnam Mahmoudi, Iranian volleyball player
- Hamid Mahmoudi, Canadian football player
- Hasan Mahmudi Kamboh, Indian minister
- Hoda Mahmoudi, Iranian-American sociologist
- Jahangir Mahmoudi, Iranian lawyer
- Morteza Mahmoudi, Iranian nanotechnologist
- Nur Mahmudi Ismail, Indonesian politician
- Reza Mahmoudi, Iranian footballer

== See also ==
- Mahmudi (disambiguation)
