= Mahmud I (disambiguation) =

Mahmud I (1696–1754), known as The Hunchback, was the Sultan of the Ottoman Empire from 1730 to 1754.

Mahmud I may also refer to:

- Mahmud I of Great Seljuq (fl. 1092–1094), sultan of the Seljuk Empire
- Mahmud I (mansa) (fl. 1390–c. 1400), ruler of the Mali Empire
- Sultan Mahmud I (1445–1511), Sultan of Gujarat Sultanate
- Mahmud I of Kalat (fl. 1794–1817), ruler of the princely state of Kalat

== See also ==
- Order of Sultan Mahmud I of Terengganu
- Mahmud (disambiguation)
- Mahmud II (disambiguation)
