= Terken Khatun (wife of Malik-Shah I) =

Chief consort of Seljuk sultan Malik Shah I

Chief consort of the Seljuk Sultan
- Tenure: 15 December 1072 – 19 November 1092

Regent of the Seljuk Empire
- Tenure: 19 November 1092 – 1094
- Born: c. 1053; Kara-Khanid Khanate
- Died: September–October 1094 (aged 38–39); Isfahan, Seljuk Empire
- Burial: Tomb of Nizam al-Mulk, Isfahan
- Spouse: Malik-Shah I
- Issue: Dawud; Ahmad; Mahmud I; Abu'l-Qasim; A son; Mah Malek Khatun
- House: Karakhanid (by birth); Seljuk (by marriage)
- Father: Tamghach Khan Ibrahim
- Religion: Sunni Islam

Terken Khatun (Persian: ترکان خاتون; also Turkan Khatun or Tarkhan Khatun; c. 1053 – September–October 1094) was the first wife and chief consort of Malik Shah I, Sultan of the Seljuk Empire from 1072, until he died in 1092. She was born as a Karakhanid princess, the daughter of Tamghach Khan Ibrahim. She was the mother of Mahmud I, the next ruler of the Seljuk Empire, and regent during his minority in 1092–1094. Turkan Khatun was the most powerful and influential woman in the Seljuk Empire.

== Early life ==
Terken Khatun was born in 1053. Her father was Tamghach Khan Ibrahim, the ruler of the Kara-Khanid Khanate. She had a brother, Shams al-Mulk Nasr.

== Marriage ==
Alp Arslan, father of Malik-Shah, gave his daughter Aisha Khatun to Shams al-Mulk Nasr, the son and successor of the Qara Khanid Tamghach Khan Ibrahim, Terkhan Khatun's father. Later in 1065, he married his son to Terken Khatun, who was aged twelve at the time, and Malik-Shah was about the same age. The two together had five sons, Dawud, Abu Shuja Ahmad, Sultan Mahmud I, born in 1087–8, Abu'l-Qasim, who died in childhood, another son who died in childhood, and was buried in Ray, and a daughter, Mah Malek Khatun, who married Abbasid Caliph Al-Muqtadi in 1082.

Nizam al-Mulk's position vis-à-vis the sultan was thus to some extent unsatisfactory, and his influence at the subordinate households of the sultan's wives in the Seljuk harem and those of the princes was still weaker. Terken Khatun's household became the focus of opposition, for Taj al-Mulk was also her intendant. The vizier doubtless had Terken Khatun in mind when in the Siyasat-Nama he denounced the malevolent influence of women at court, citing their misleading advice to the ruler and their susceptibility to promptings from their attendants and eunuchs. Terken Khatun's son Dawud had been his father's favourite son, but he died in 1082. Six years later, Malik-Shah had capital approval when he proclaimed as heir another of his sons, Abu Shuja Ahmad, and gave him a resplendent string of honorifics, but in the following year, he too died. After these disappointments, it was not surprising that Terken Khatun wanted to promote the succession of her third son, Mahmud, even though he was the youngest of all the possible candidates.

Towards the end of Malik-Shah's reign, Qodun, the shahna of Marv, complained to the Sultan that he had been seized by Nizam al-Mulk's son, Shams al-Din Uthman who was rais of Marv. Malik Shah wrote to Nizam al-Mulk reproaching him with these words, "These your children have each gained the mastery over a large district and govern large province. But this does not satisfy them and they exceed what a politic and desire to do this and that." Nizam al-Mulk defended himself but on this occasion the Sultan's anger was not assuaged and he began to plot against the life of the vizier. Terken Khatun added fuel to the fire, accusing Nizam al-Mulk of dividing the kingdom among his children. Her opposition to Nizam al-Mulk was due to his having urged Malik Shah to nominate Berkyaruq, the thirteen year old son of Zubayda Khatun, heir apparent, whereas she wished her own son Mahmud, an infant, to be so nominated and was supported in this by Taj al-Mulk, who was vizier to Terken Khatun. She joined an intrigue mounted against Nizam al-Mulk by Taj al-Mulk, Majid al-Mulk Baravistani Qummi, the mustaufi, Sadid al-Mulk, the aird.

Turkan Khotun, who could influence her husband, eventually managed to remove the prime minister Nizamulmulk from the palace. Not satisfied with this, they secretly conspired with the minister's political opponents, the Ismailis of Alamut, and managed to physically destroy him. As a result, on October 14, 1092, Nizam al-Mulk, who was traveling from Isfahan to Baghdad, was killed by a Hashshoshi assassin near Nakhovand. Shortly after the death of the vizier Nizam al-Mulk, Turkan Khotun and Sultan Malik Shah set out for Baghdad. The reason for this visit was that Sultan Malik Shah intended to remove the Abbasid Caliph al-Muqtadi from the throne of Baghdad and install in his place his granddaughter, Mohmalak, the daughter of his beloved wife Turkan, and the son of the Caliph. The Sultan died on November 19, 1092, at his residence near Baghdad.

== Political Life ==
She possessed great influence and power due to her beauty, her elevated rank, and the splendor she inherited through her connection to Sultan Malik-Shah—her authority, respect, and influence stemmed from her familial relationship with the sultan, not solely from her own personal abilities. She harbored deep hostility toward Khwaja Nizam al-Mulk. She had a special minister named Taj al-Mulk Abu al-Ghana'im al-Farsi, a handsome, eloquent, capable, learned, and ambitious man. He also served as the custodian of the wardrobe treasury (the royal store of garments and court valuables). Turkan Khatun sought to raise him above Nizam al-Mulk and appoint him to the vizierate in his place. She appointed Taj al-Mulk Abu al-Ghana'im, who headed Turkan Khatun’s dīwān (administrative bureau), in place of Nizam al-Mulk.

She played a fully direct role in the political and military affairs of the realm and, alongside Malik-Shah, managed political, economic, and all state matters. She was a partner to her husband in sovereignty and was the most powerful woman in the entire history of the Seljuks. During her husband’s reign, she effectively held the reins of state affairs in her hands. Many historians consider her one of the principal figures behind the dismissal and later assassination of Khwaja Nizam al-Mulk Tusi, Malik-Shah’s vizier. She subsequently played the leading role in the appointment of Taj al-Mulk to the vizierate. The reason for her bitter enmity with Nizam al-Mulk was that he opposed the designation of Mahmud as heir apparent, considering him unfit and unqualified for the position.

Malik-Shah appointed two of Turkan Khatun’s sons, Dawud and Ahmad, as his heirs, but both of them died before their father. Dawud, Turkan Khatun’s son, was his father’s favorite, but he died before his father.

The entry of Shiʿites into Sultan Malik-Shah’s court was connected to Malik-Shah’s own spirit of religious tolerance and moderation, as well as to the presence and influence of his wife, Turkan Khatun. She even played an influential role in the caliph’s court.

Turkan Khatun, owing to her great prestige, was the second most powerful person in the empire after the sultan. She even maintained her own separate dīwān (administrative court). In the later years of Malik-Shah’s life, Turkan Khatun, his wife, held authority over the dīwān of Tughril and the sultanic correspondence (imperial seal). After Malik-Shah’s death, Turkan Khatun gathered a large following to secure the throne for her son Mahmud. In fact, Turkan Khatun was of royal descent. She had also exercised control over state affairs and the treasury since Malik-Shah’s reign, and for this reason, she had repeatedly shown favor to the soldiers. Turkan Khatun maintained a special military unit of 12,000 men under her command. After Malik-Shah’s death, she distributed 20,000,000 dinars in gold among the members of the army, thereby winning their loyalty.

She played an important role in preserving and sustaining the power of the dynasty. Not only as the wife and mother of sultans, but also as an active stateswoman, she was influential in the political developments of her time. Her death marked a turning point in Seljuk history, leading to intensified internal conflicts and political changes. At the time of her death, Turkan Khatun owned ten thousand Turki horses, a testament to her immense power.

Bāgh Ahmad Siyāh was a garden built in Isfahan in the 3rd century AH by Ahmad ibn Siyāh, the ancestor of ʿAbd al-Rahman ibn Muhammad ibn Siyāh. During the reign of Sultan Malik-Shah of the Seljuks, it served as the residence of his wife, Turkan Khatun. The garden was exceptionally large, featuring interconnected halls with high ceilings, intricately carved and painted frames, stuccoed walls, mirror work, and halls with latticed walls made of beautifully carved clove wood. It was located on the western side of Isfahan, alongside the Zayandeh River.

== Regency ==
In 1092, when Malik Shah I was assassinated shortly after Nizam al-Mulk, Terken Khatun, who concealed the Sultan’s death from the royal entourage while arranging the succession of her son, began to plot her course of action, Taj al-Mulk nominated Mahmud as Sultan and set out for Isfahan. Mahmud was a child, and his mother Terken Khatun wished to seize power in his name. To accomplish this, she entered in negotiations with her son-in-law, the Abbasid Caliph al-Muqtadi, to secure her rule. The Caliph opposed both a child and a woman as ruler, and could not be persuaded to allow the khutba, the sign of the sovereign, to be proclaimed in the name of a woman.

Eventually, however, the Caliph agreed to let her govern if the khutba was said in the name of her son, and if she did so assisted by a vizier he appointed for her, a condition to which she saw herself forced to accept. She was thus not formally a regent, but she secured the reins of power de facto with al-Shirazi as vizier and Unar as army commander. She was openly acknowledged to be the ruler and manager of the institutions and political and military business of the state otherwise the privilege of a male ruler, and the phrase "khatun dispatched the armies to fight" was often named, illustrating her authority to command the military issues of the state.

On arrival in Isfahan, Taj al-Mulk seized and imprisoned Berkyaruq on Terken Khatun's orders, but the Nizamiyya mamluks, who hated Terken Khatun because of her enmity to their late master, set Berkyaruq free and took him to Ray, where the rais of the city, Nizam al-Mulk's son-in-law crowned him.

Taj al-Mulk and Terken Khatun set out after Berkyaruq, but were defeated at Borujerd in 1092–93. Terken Khatun retired with her forces to Isfahan, where she was besieged. Taj al-Mulk who had fled at the battle of Borujerd, meanwhile came to Berkyaruq and offered him 200,000 dinars to make him vizier.

== Death ==
From Isfahan Terken Khatun tried to make contact with Tulush, but she died suddenly in 1094, to be followed a month later by her son Mahmud.

The chronicler Sadr al-Din Ali ibn Nasir al-Husayni states that Terken Khatun held great power during Malik Shah’s lifetime for three reasons: because she treated the soldiers well, because she descended from the lineage of Afrasiab, and because she had control over the treasures. According to Ibn al-Sa'i, after the death of her husband she could rely on a personal army of 10,000 Turkish mamluks, commanded the army, and governed the state; after her death, her son’s power collapsed.

== Bibliography ==
- Boyle, J. A., ed. (1968). The Cambridge History of Iran, Volume 5. Cambridge University Press. p. 191. ISBN 978-0-521-06936-6.
- Lambton, Ann K. S. (January 1, 1988). Continuity and Change in Medieval Persia. SUNY Press. ISBN 978-0-887-06133-2.
