= Mahmud (disambiguation) =

Mahmud is a given name and surname.

Mahmud and variations may also refer to:

== People ==
- Mehmood (actor) (1932–2004), Indian film actor and comedian
- Mahmood (singer) (born 1992), Italian singer of Italian and Egyptian origin
- Mahmud (Timurid Dynasty) (born c. 1446), Timurid ruler of Herat
- Mahmud of Ghazni, (971–1030), ruler of the Turkic dynasty of Ghaznavids
- Mahmud I (disambiguation)
- Mahmud II (disambiguation)

== Places ==
- Mahmud, Khuzestan, Iran
- Mahmud, South Khorasan, Iran

== Other uses ==
- Mahmoud (horse), Epsom Derby winner in 1936
- Mahmoud (elephant), an elephant associated with the Year of the Elephant in Islamic history

== See also ==
- Mahmudi (disambiguation)
