= Jameh Mosque of Isfahan =

Mosque in Iran

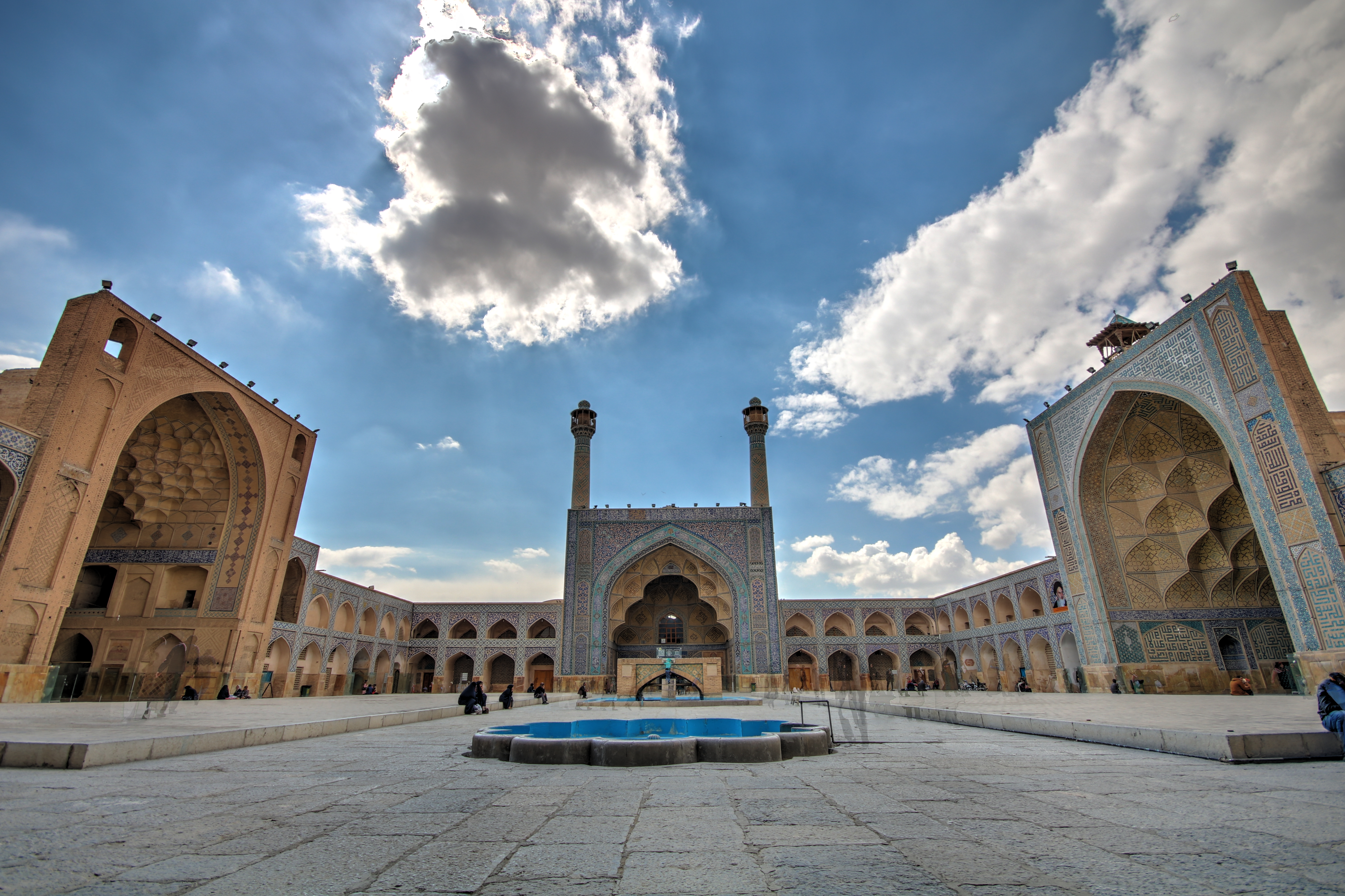
- The mosque courtyard and iwans, in 2018

- Location of the mosque in Iran

Religion
- Affiliation: Shia Islam
- Ecclesiastical or organisational status: Friday mosque
- Status: Active

Location
- Location: Isfahan, Isfahan Province
- Country: Iran
- Coordinates: 32°40′11″N 51°41′7″E

Architecture
- Style: Iranian (Islamic)
- Completed: c. 771 CE (1st structure); c. 841 (2nd structure); 11th century (domes added); 12th century (iwans added); 14th–17th centuries (minor additions)
- Minaret: Two

Website
- isfahanjamehmosque.com

UNESCO World Heritage Site
- Official name: Masjed-e Jāmé of Isfahan
- Criteria: Cultural: (ii)
- Designated: 2012
- Reference no.: 1397
- Area: 2.0756 ha (5.129 acres)
- Buffer zone: 18.6351 ha (46.048 acres)

The Jāmeh Mosque of Isfahān or Jāme' Mosque of Isfahān (Persian: مسجد جامع اصفهان Masjid-e-Jāmeh Isfahān), also known as the Atiq Mosque (مسجد عتیق) and the Friday Mosque of Isfahān (مسجد جمعه), is a historic congregational mosque (Jāmeh), located in Isfahan, Iran. The mosque is the result of continual construction, reconstruction, additions and renovations on the site from c. 771 CE to the end of the 20th century. The Grand Bazaar of Isfahan can be found towards the southwest wing of the mosque. It has been a UNESCO World Heritage Site since 2012. It is one of the largest and most important monuments of Islamic architecture in Iran.

== History ==
=== Early history ===
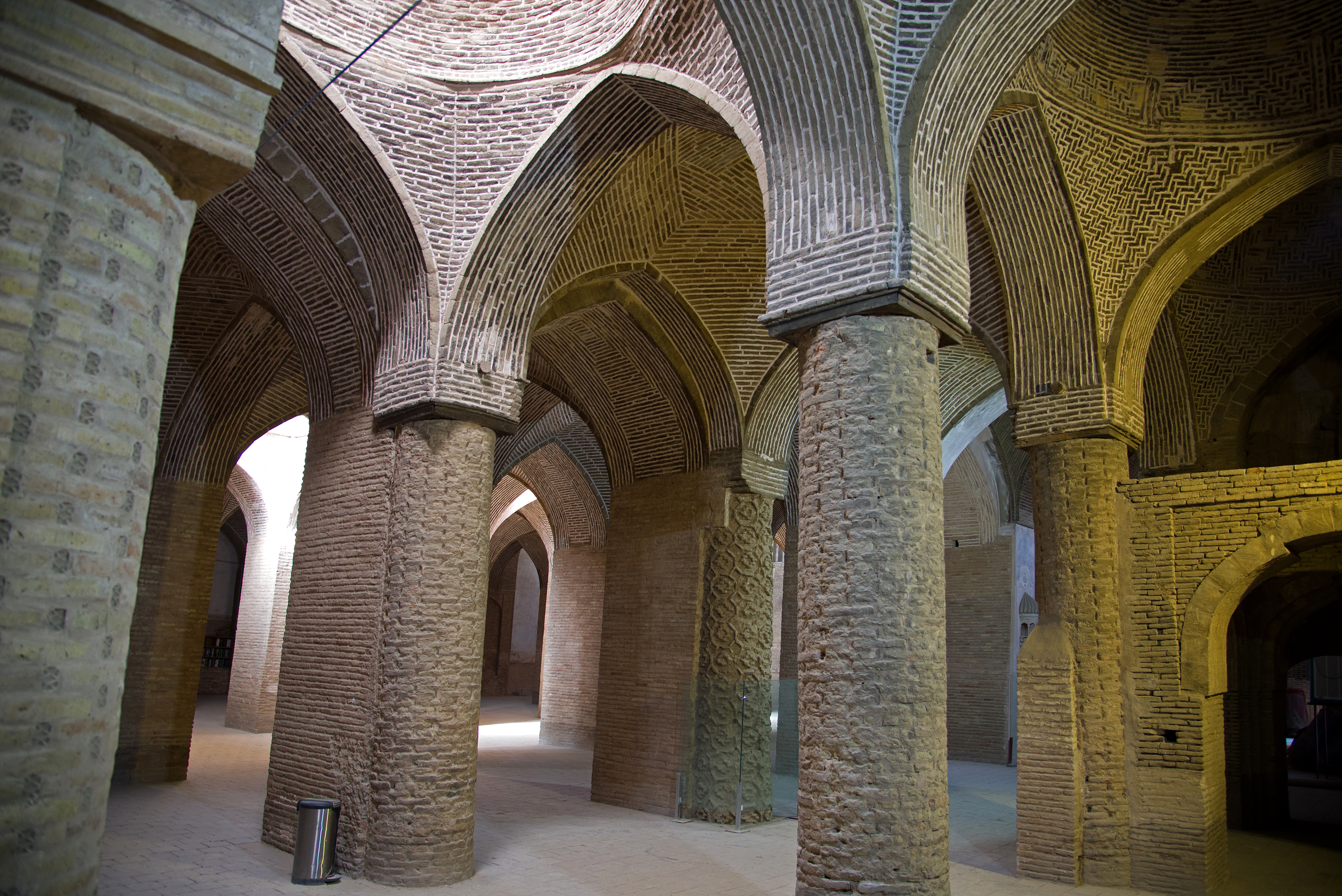
Example of hypostyle hall in the mosque today

The first mosque on this site was built circa 771, during the reign of the Abbasid caliph al-Mansur. This first building was relatively small, measuring approximately 52 by 90 metres (171 by 295 ft). It was built in mud-brick and had stucco-decoration in the Syro-Mesopotamian style of Abbasid architecture. Its remains were excavated in the 1970s during studies of the present-day mosque. The excavations revealed that the original mosque was built over earlier structures dating from the Sasanian period (or at latest from the early Islamic period), which were part of the ancient town of Yahūdiyya or Yahudiye that is mentioned in historical sources.

The mosque was then replaced by a larger one in 840–841 during the reign of al-Mu'tasim. This new building measured approximately 88 by 128 metres (289 by 420 ft) and had a different qibla orientation than the first one. It had a large central courtyard surrounded by an arcade and hypostyle hall of baked brick pillars supporting either a flat roof or a roof of brick vaults. The hypostyle hall, was two bays deep along the sides, four bays deep on the side opposite the qibla (the northwest), and six bays deep on the qibla side where the main prayer hall was. The aisle leading to the mosque's mihrab was slightly wider than the other aisles. There is no indication that the new mosque had a minaret, despite the existence of this feature in other mosques of the period, although Muqaddasi described the presence of a tall minaret in a central mosque of Isfahan before 985.

Under the control of the Buyid dynasty (10th-11th centuries) another arcade of polylobed brick piers was added around the courtyard, in front of the existing courtyard façades. Instead of the earlier stucco decoration, the new additions were decorated with patterns created with bricks laid in circles, diamond shapes, zigzags, and other geometric patterns similar to the brickwork found in other monuments from the Buyid period. The exact date of this renovation is uncertain and is estimated by some to be c. 975 CE or the late 10th century. Oleg Grabar estimated the date as being between 985 and 1040, based on descriptions of the mosque in historical sources. Two minarets were also added at the entrance of the mosque near the dyers' market. They stood on either side of the entrance and were each built on top of a pedestal or base structure. This is the first recorded instance of the double minaret arrangement which later became common in Iran and beyond.

=== Seljuk period ===
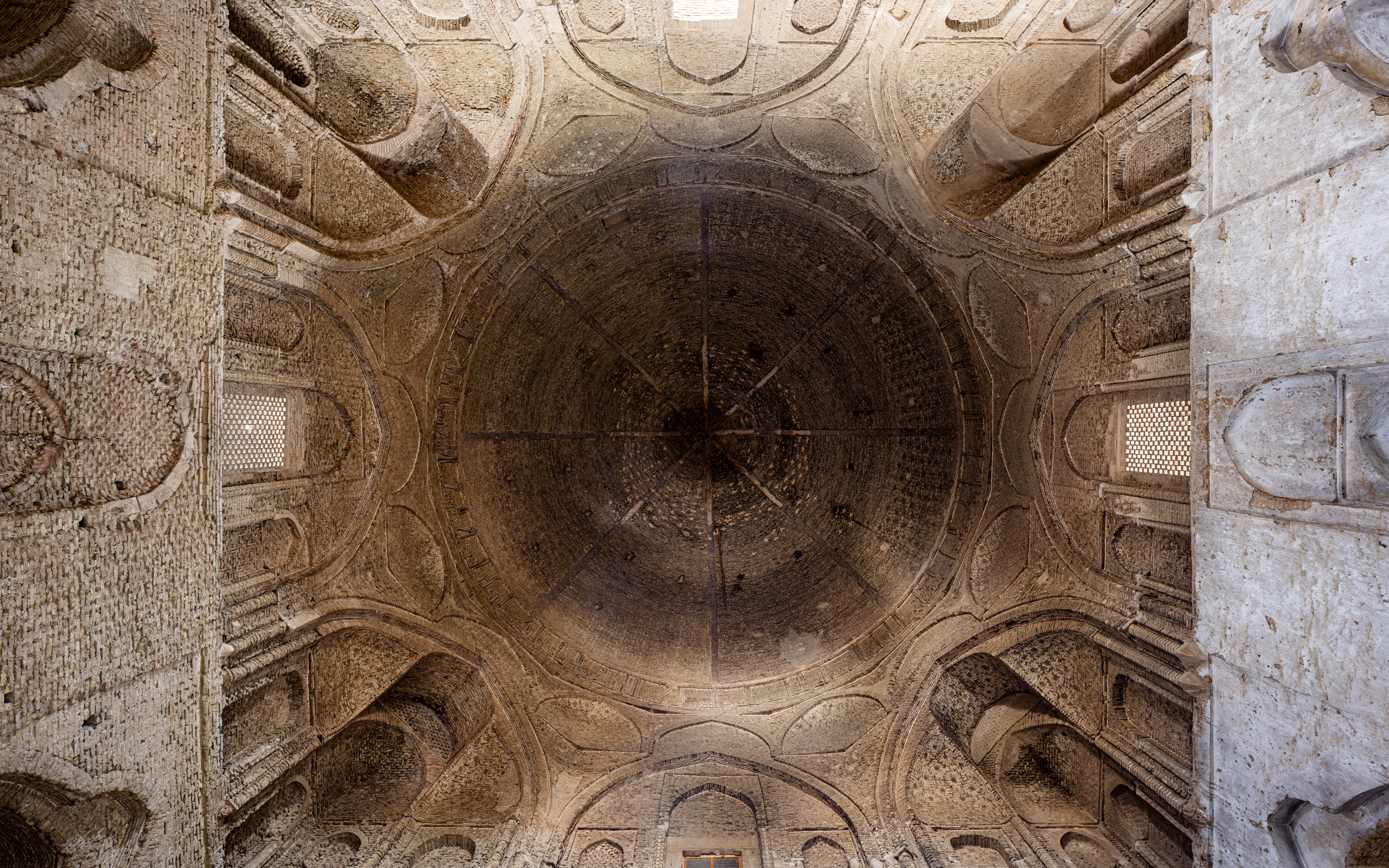
Southern dome (in front of the mihrab), built in 1086–87 under patronage of Nizam al-Mulk

The next great modifications of the mosque took place under the patronage of the Seljuks. Isfahan became the first capital of the Seljuk Empire after its conquest in 1050. The Seljuks modified the relatively uniform and egalitarian form of the hypostyle building, first by replacing the columns in front of the mihrab (on the south side of the mosque) with a large domed space in 1086–87. This was done under the patronage of Nizam al-Mulk, the famous vizier of Malik Shah. The new dome was the largest masonry dome in the Islamic world at the time. It has eight ribs and is supported on massive piers. It also introduced a new type of squinch, consisting of a barrel vault placed above two quarter-domes, which was copied in other mosques shortly afterward. This was an early appearance of the muqarnas technique (a three-dimensional geometrical composition of niches), which had been developing around this period. The domed space may have been intended to act as a maqsura, an area reserved for the sultan and his entourage during prayers.

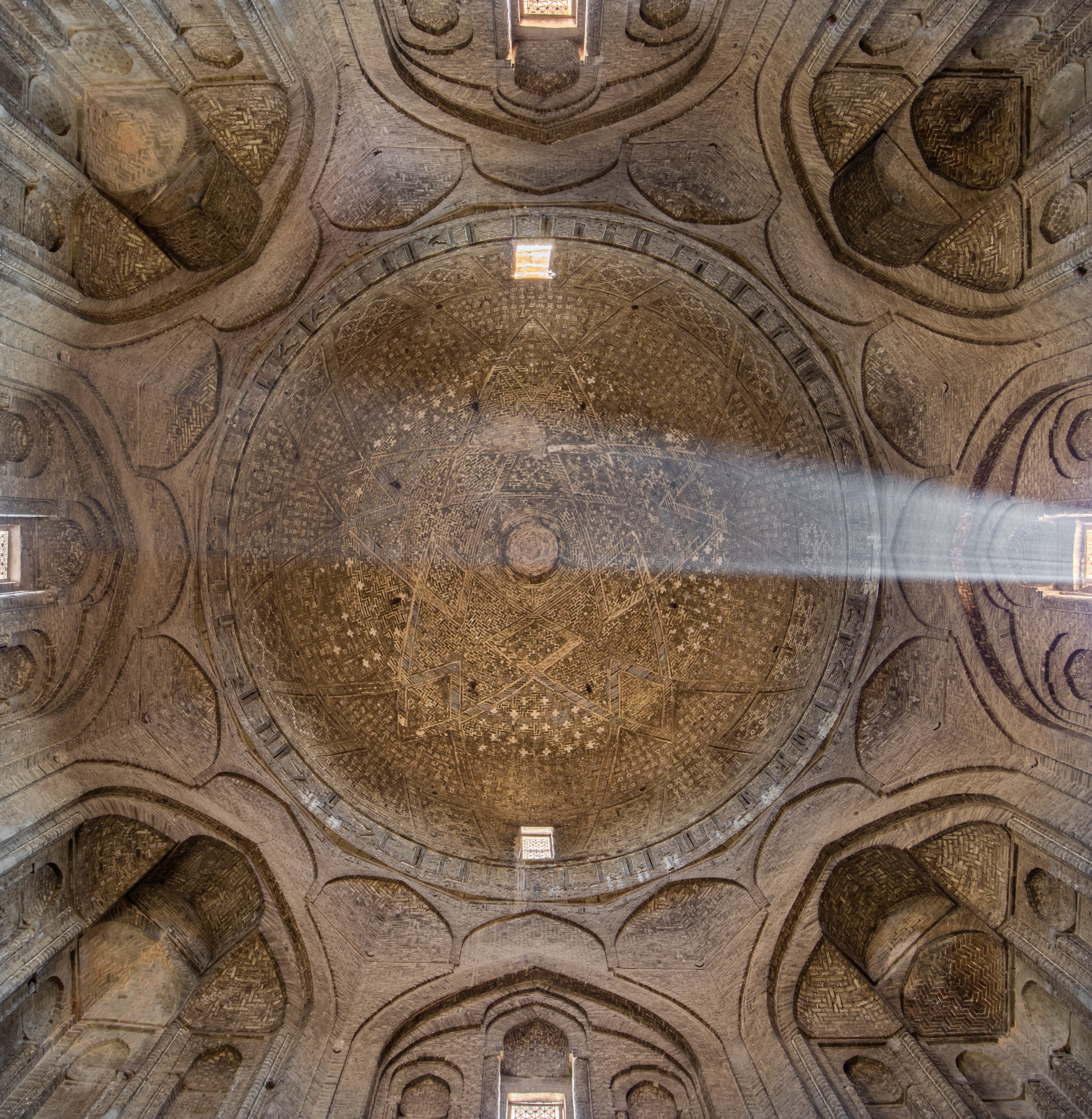
North dome, built in 1088–89 under patronage of Taj al-Mulk

In 1088–89, another dome was constructed on the north side of the mosque by Nizam al-Mulk's rival Taj al-Mulk. The function of this domed chamber is uncertain. Although it was situated along the north–south axis, it was located outside the boundaries of the mosque. The dome is considered a masterpiece of medieval Iranian architecture. Unlike the simpler eight-ribbed dome of Nizam al-Mulk, the north dome has interlacing ribs that form pentagons and five-pointed star patterns across the dome, a significant technical and aesthetic advancement. The lower walls of the chamber have a lighter and more elegant appearance, while the various elements of the wall and dome are also better-aligned vertically, leading one's gaze upward. Muqarnas squinches are again used for the transition of the dome to the square chamber.

The next major transformation stage took place by the early 12th century, probably after the mosque was damaged by fire in 1121–22. The historical context and exact chronology of this transformation are not well understood. At the latest, it was probably accomplished before 1230, when the Mongol invasions would have halted any major construction activity. To enhance the approach to the domed chamber of the mihrab, which stood in isolation amidst the older hypostyle hall, the columned space between the dome and the courtyard was replaced by a large iwan (a vaulted hall open to one side). This large barrel-vaulted hall is open to the courtyard on one side and leads to the domed hall through a doorway on the other side. To complement it, the builders created three more monumental iwans in the middle of each other side of the courtyard. The northern iwan may have been the last of these to be built. These transformations resulted in giving the mosque its current four-iwan form, a type of layout which subsequently became prevalent in Iran and other parts of the Islamic world. The southern iwan of the courtyard (leading to the mihrab) was distinguished from the other iwans by being larger and by being embellished with large tiers of muqarnas. Different muqarnas compositions were also added to the other iwans at one time or another, with the result that the iwans, even if built around the same time, look different from each other now.

In addition to the addition of four iwans, the remaining bays of the old hypostyle halls were renovated with cross-ribbed vaults. There are around 200 of these smaller vaults, and they all have different designs and display a rich variety of geometric decoration. Some of this work was probably done in the late 11th or early 12th centuries, but the chronology of construction here is unclear, and many vaults likely date from different periods of repair and renovation. It's uncertain if the earlier minarets of the mosque were preserved until this time, but no historical texts refer to them after the mid-11th century.

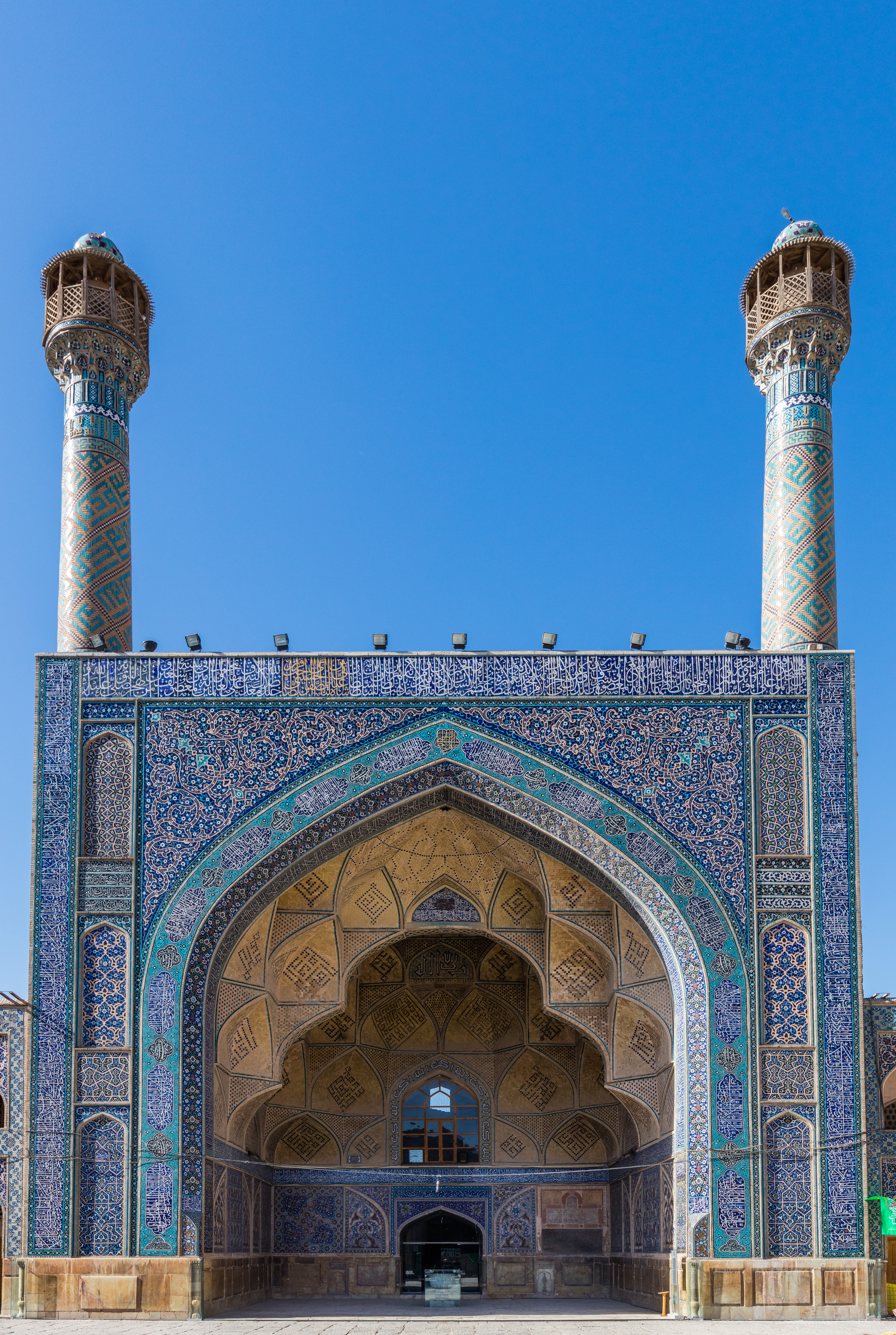
South iwan of the courtyard (leading to the mihrab chamber)

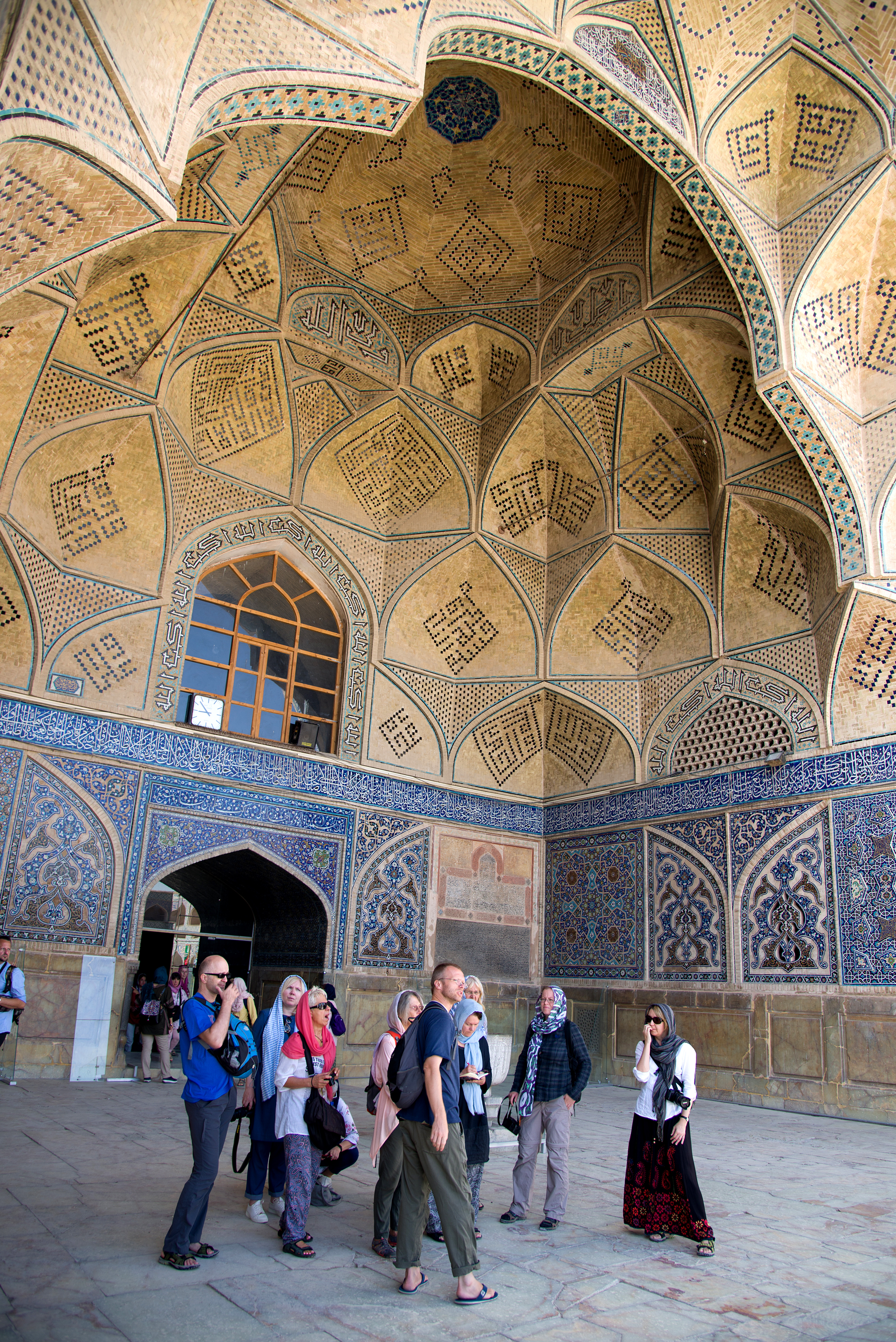
Detail and muqarnas vaulting in the southern iwan

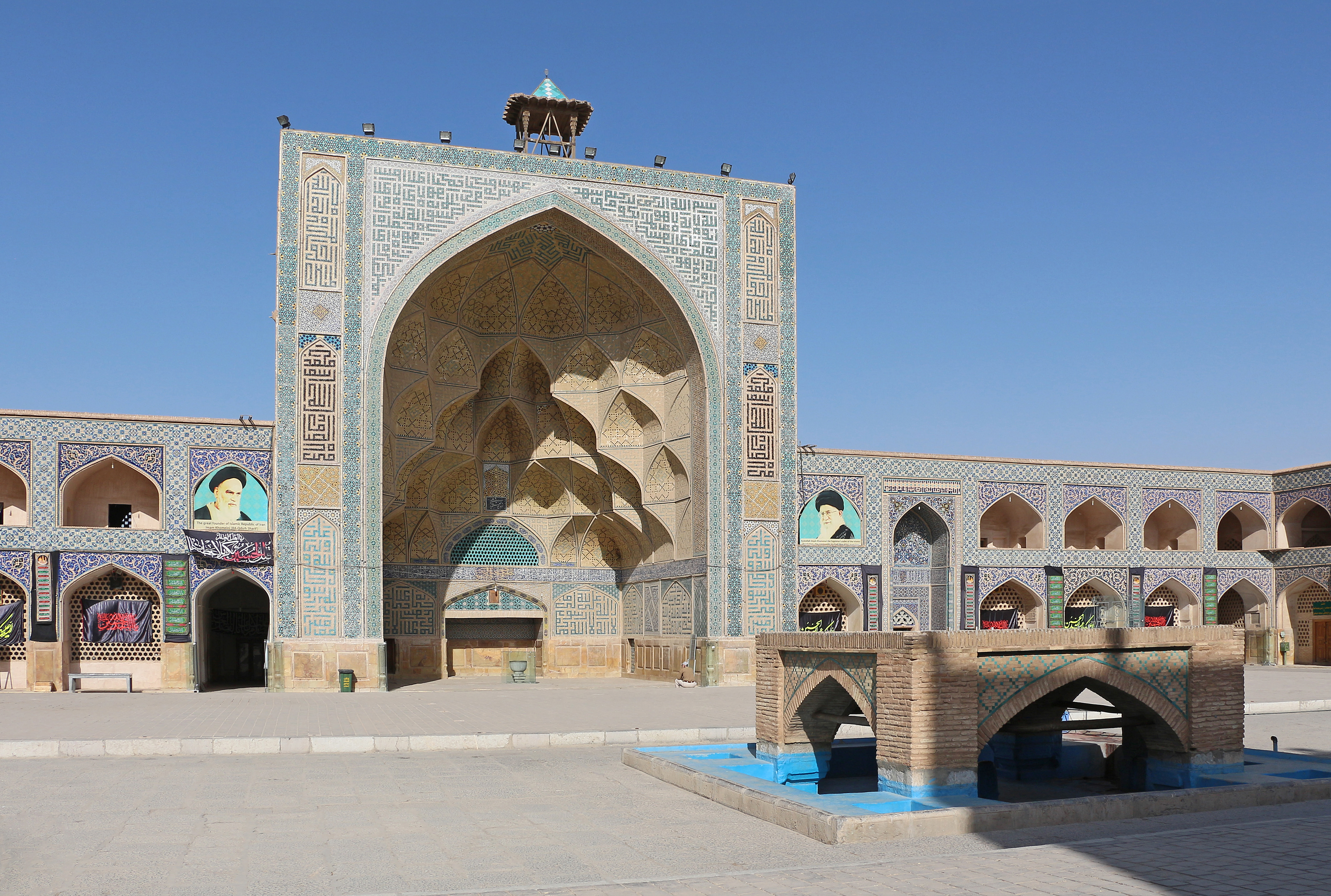
West iwan of the courtyard

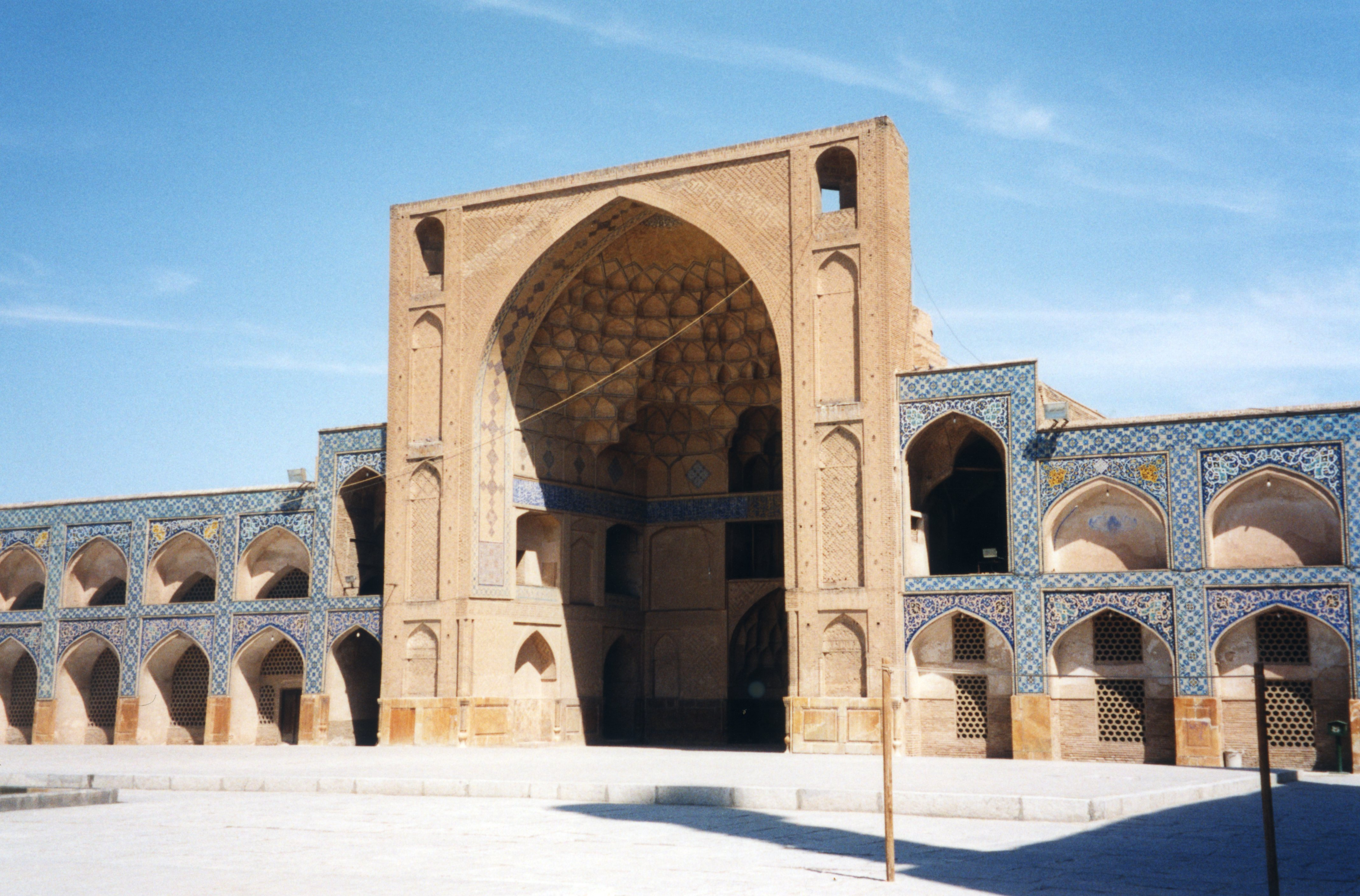
East iwan of the courtyard

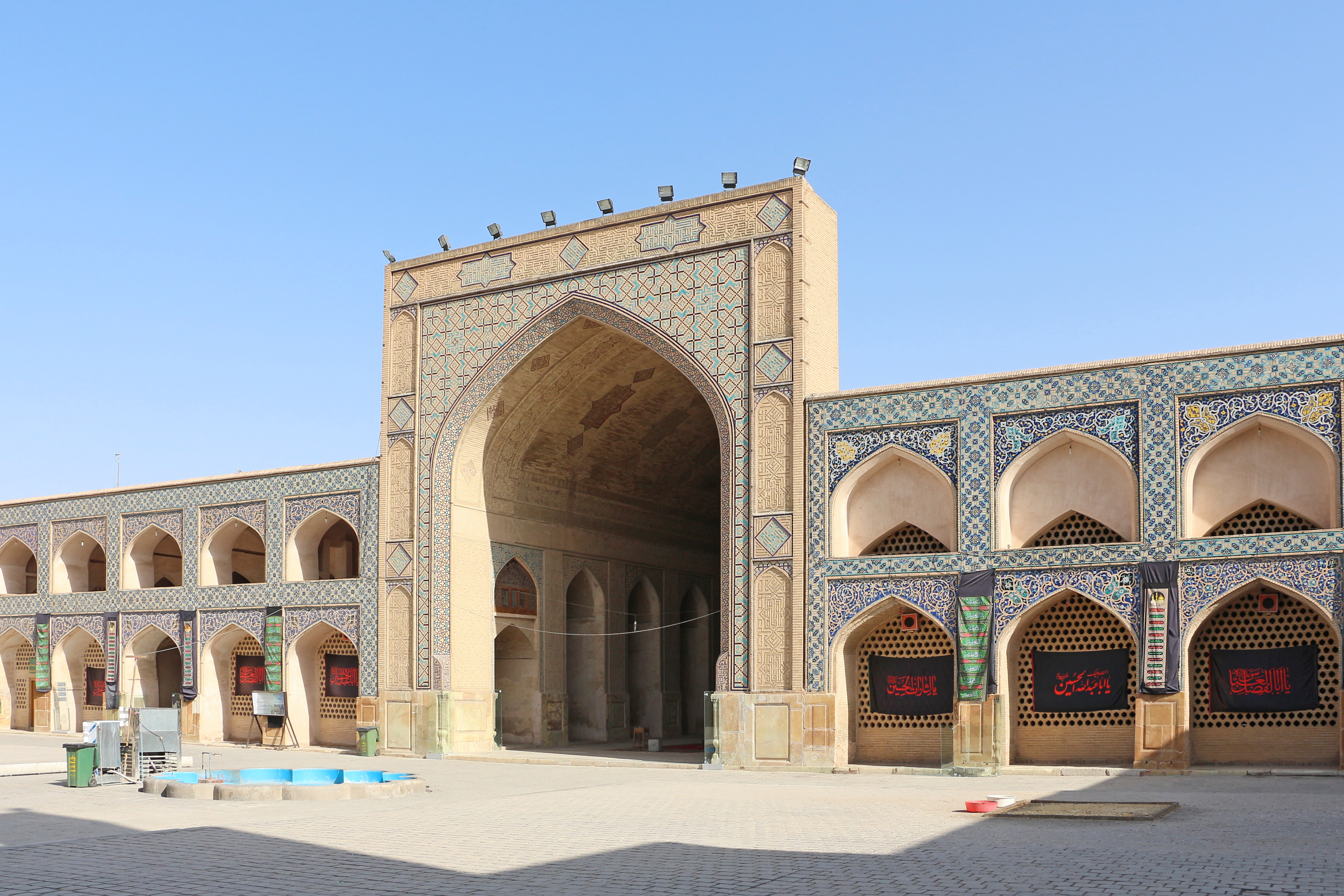
North iwan of the courtyard

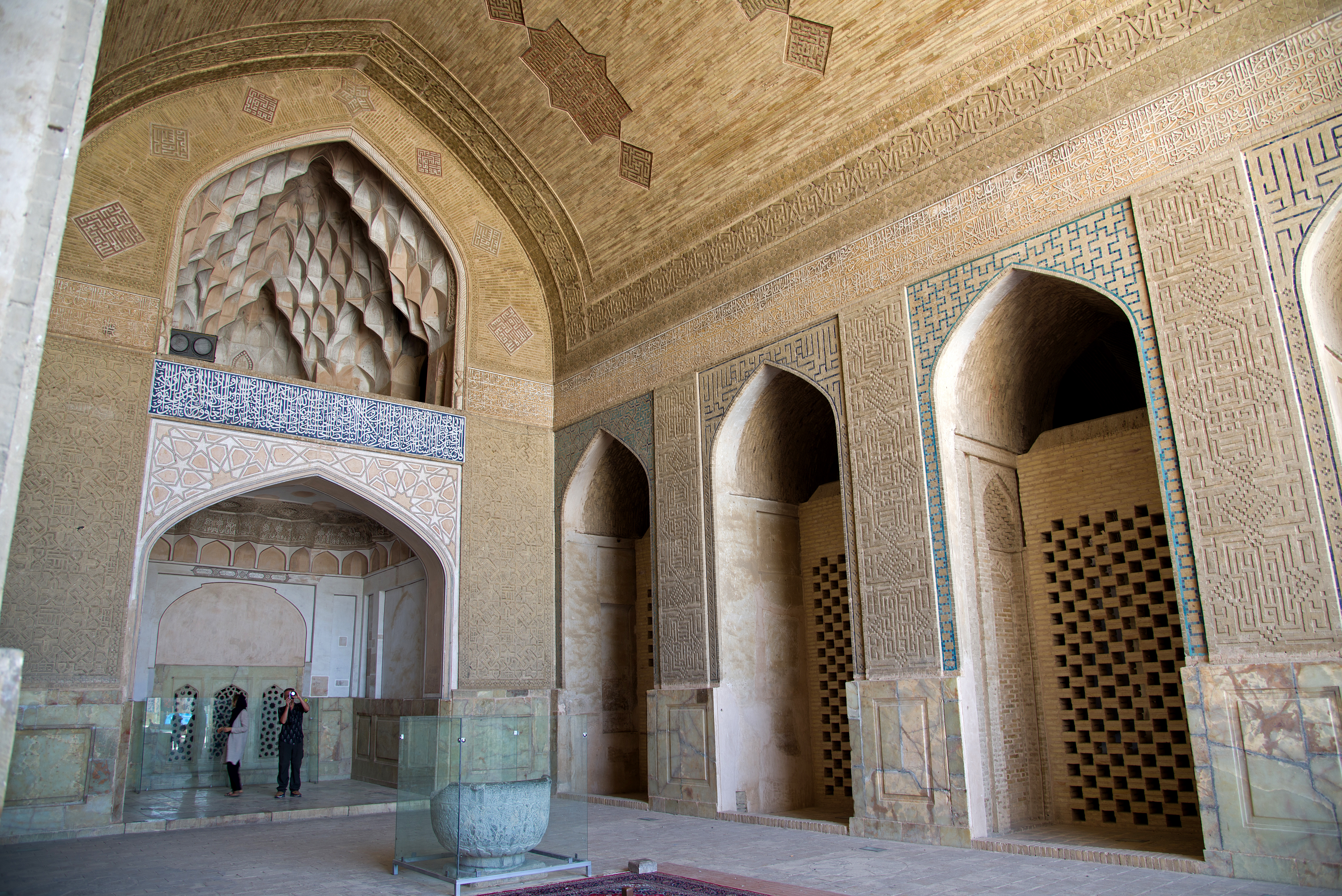
Interior and detail of the northern iwan

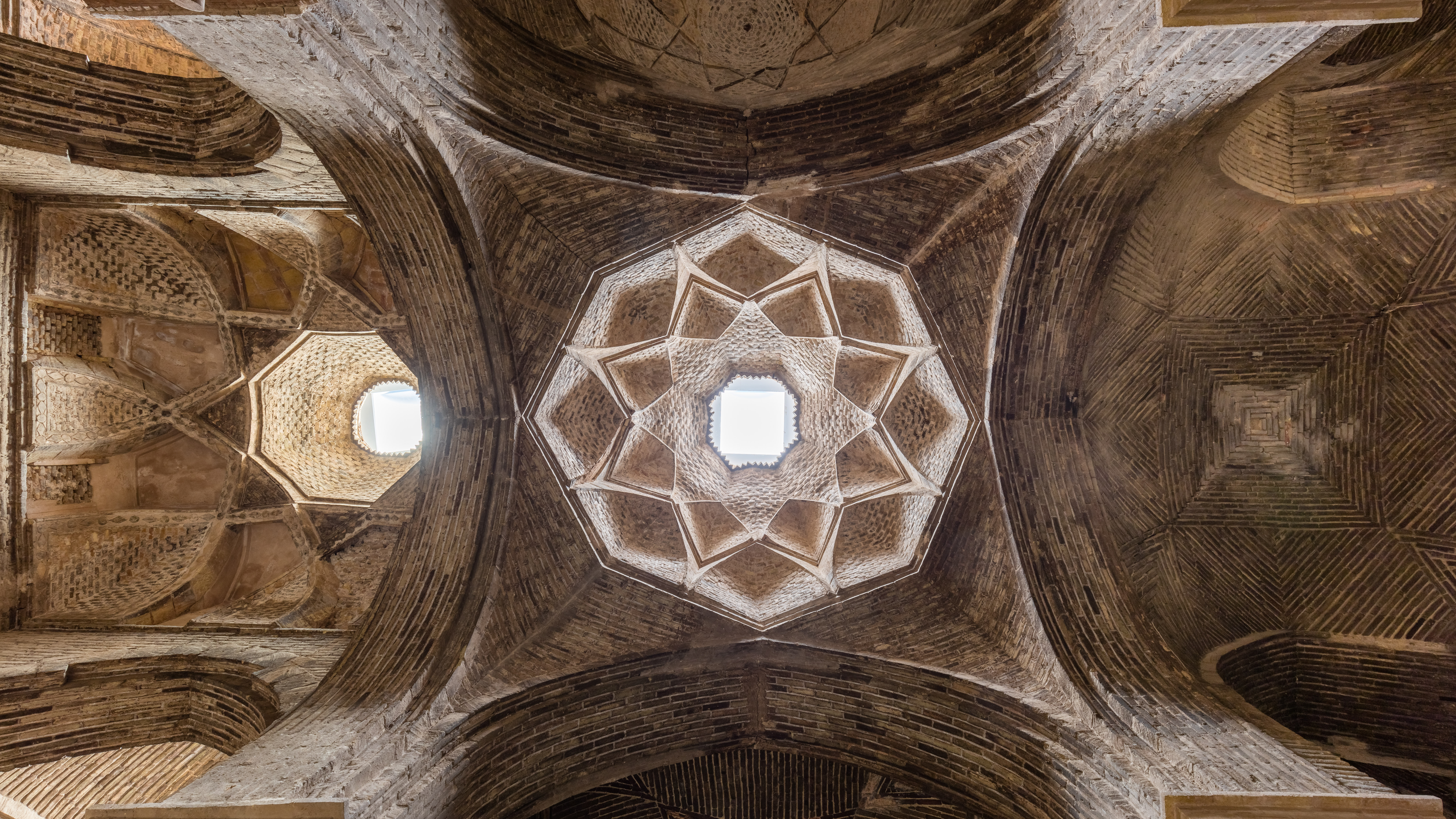
Example of the variety of smaller domes in the hypostyle prayer hall

=== Later changes and additions ===
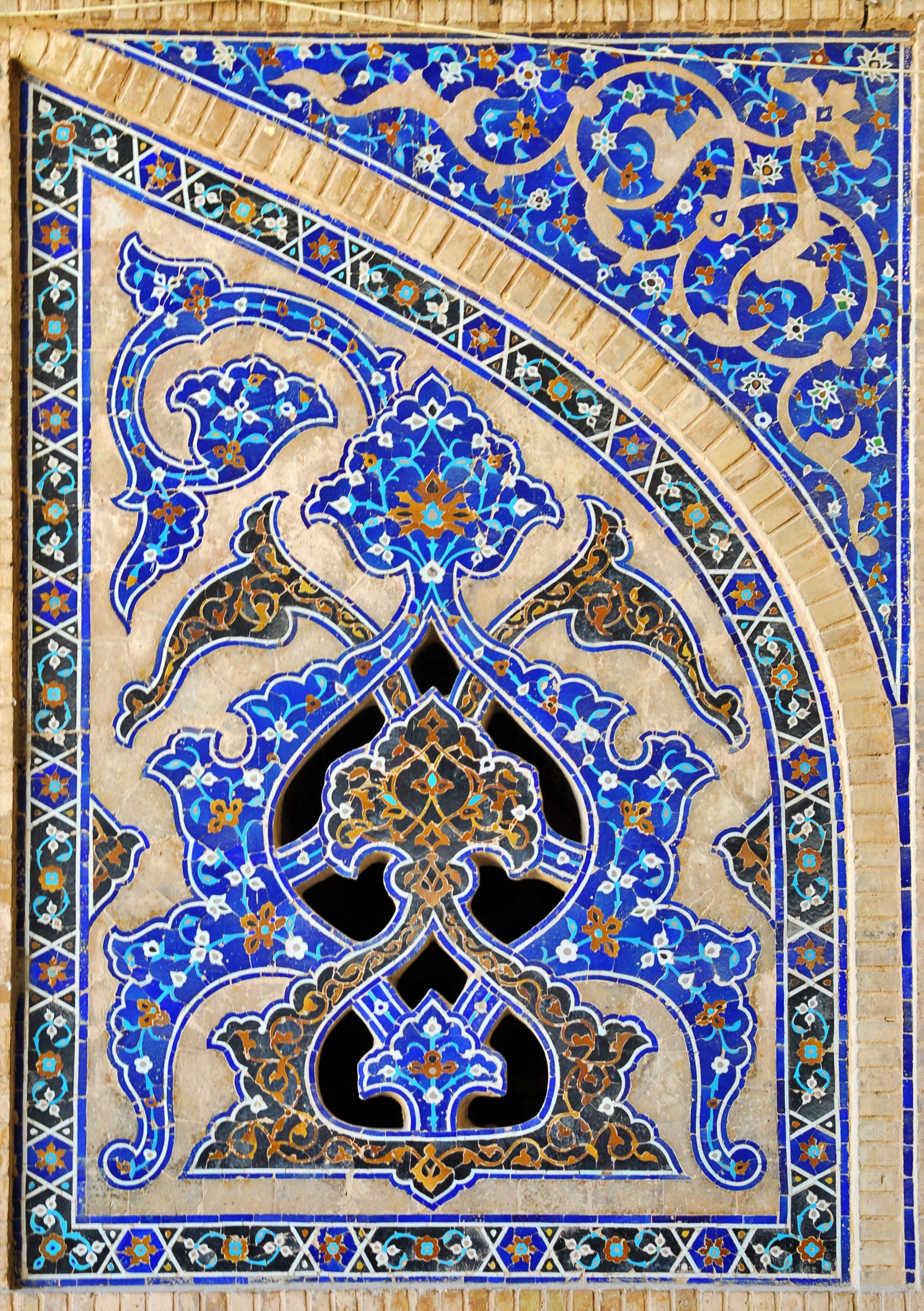
Mo'araq tilework created by the Aq Qoyunlu ruler Uzun Hasan circa 1475–76, at the south iwan of the courtyard

After this, the later changes to the mosque were more limited. Nonetheless, nearly every period saw some work done on the mosque, reflecting the changing needs of the community and the changing tastes of new rulers. Under the Ilkhanid sultan Uljaytu (r. 1304–1317), the arcade around the sides of the courtyard was vertically divided into two levels, as it appears today. Uljaytu also created another rectangular prayer hall or "winter hall" adjoining the north side of the western iwan of the mosque. This hall is covered by a series of remarkable transverse vaults, while its southern wall features an elaborately carved stucco mihrab dated to 1310. The mihrab is one of the finest works of Iranian or Islamic sculptural art from this period. It was crafted by Haydar, a highly respected calligrapher of the time who included his signature in the work.

Under the Muzaffarids a madrasa, known as the Muzaffarid Madrasa, was added on the east side of the mosque and another prayer hall on the west, both beyond the former outer wall of the mosque. This work was done possibly by Qutb al-Din Shah Mahmud, the governor of Isfahan (r. 1358–1375) who disputed the throne with his brother Shah Shuja.

In the 15th century changes were limited to various repairs. The vaulted ceiling of Uljaytu's prayer hall was reconstructed and many of the smaller vaults and domes of the hypostyle hall may date from this time. A new prayer hall was added on the southeast corner. The façades of the courtyard wee also progressively decorated with tilework. In particular, the rich tilework covering the façade of the southern iwan today was originally added under the patronage of the Aq Qoyunlu ruler Uzun Hasan in 1475–6.

Most Safavid rulers did work on the mosque, except for Shah Abbas I who was more preoccupied with his new constructions around the Naqsh-e Jahan Square. The current minarets of the mosque, which stand on either side of the southern iwan, were erected in the 17th century. During the Safavid era some parts of the prayer halls were also enlarged and new tile revetment were added to the iwans and minarets. The Muzaffarid prayer hall on the west side was replaced with a larger "winter prayer hall" during this time, distinguished by its wide, low arches. Further repairs and restorations were carried out under the later Afsharid and Qajar dynasties and up to modern times.

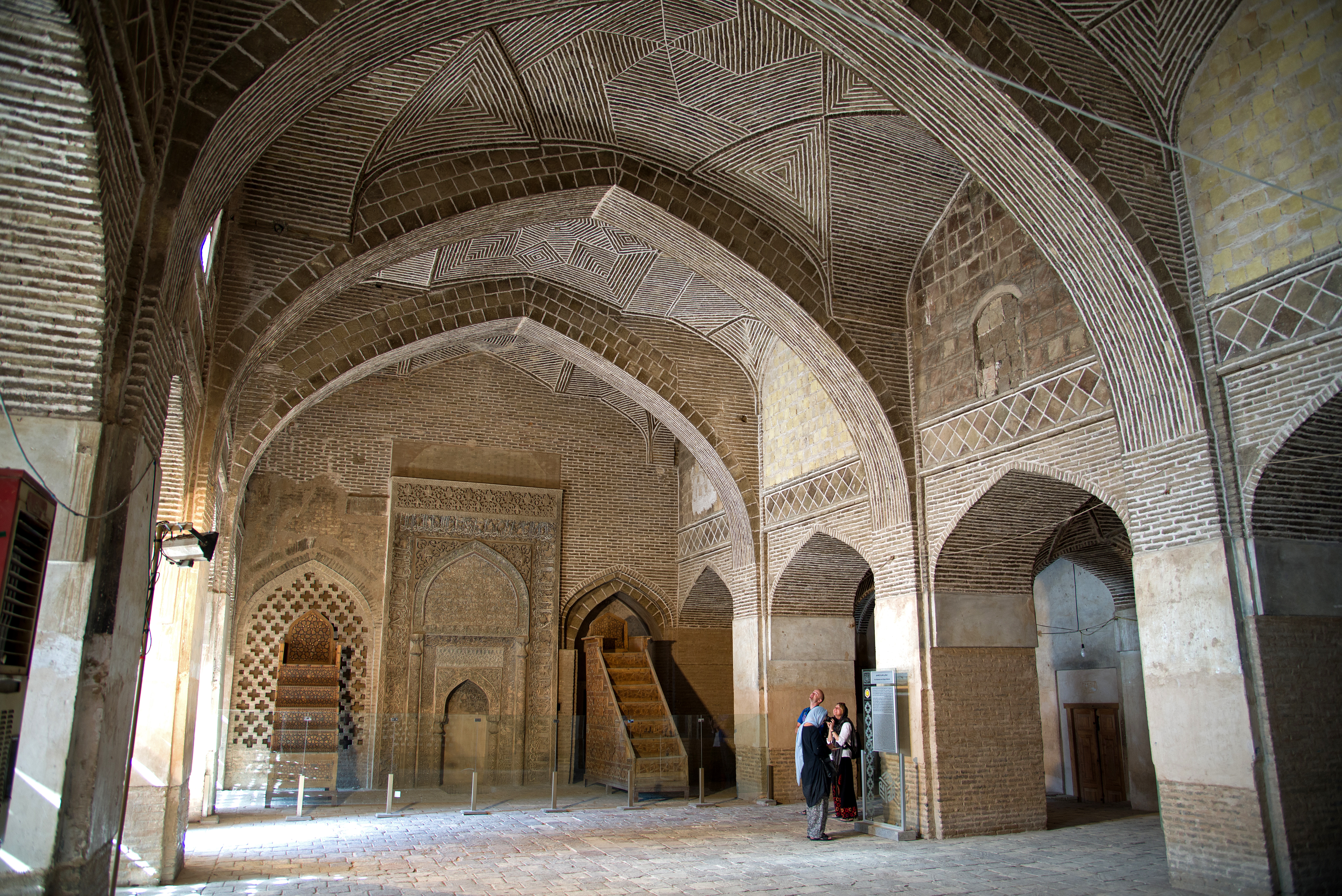
Ilkhanid prayer hall (early 14th century)

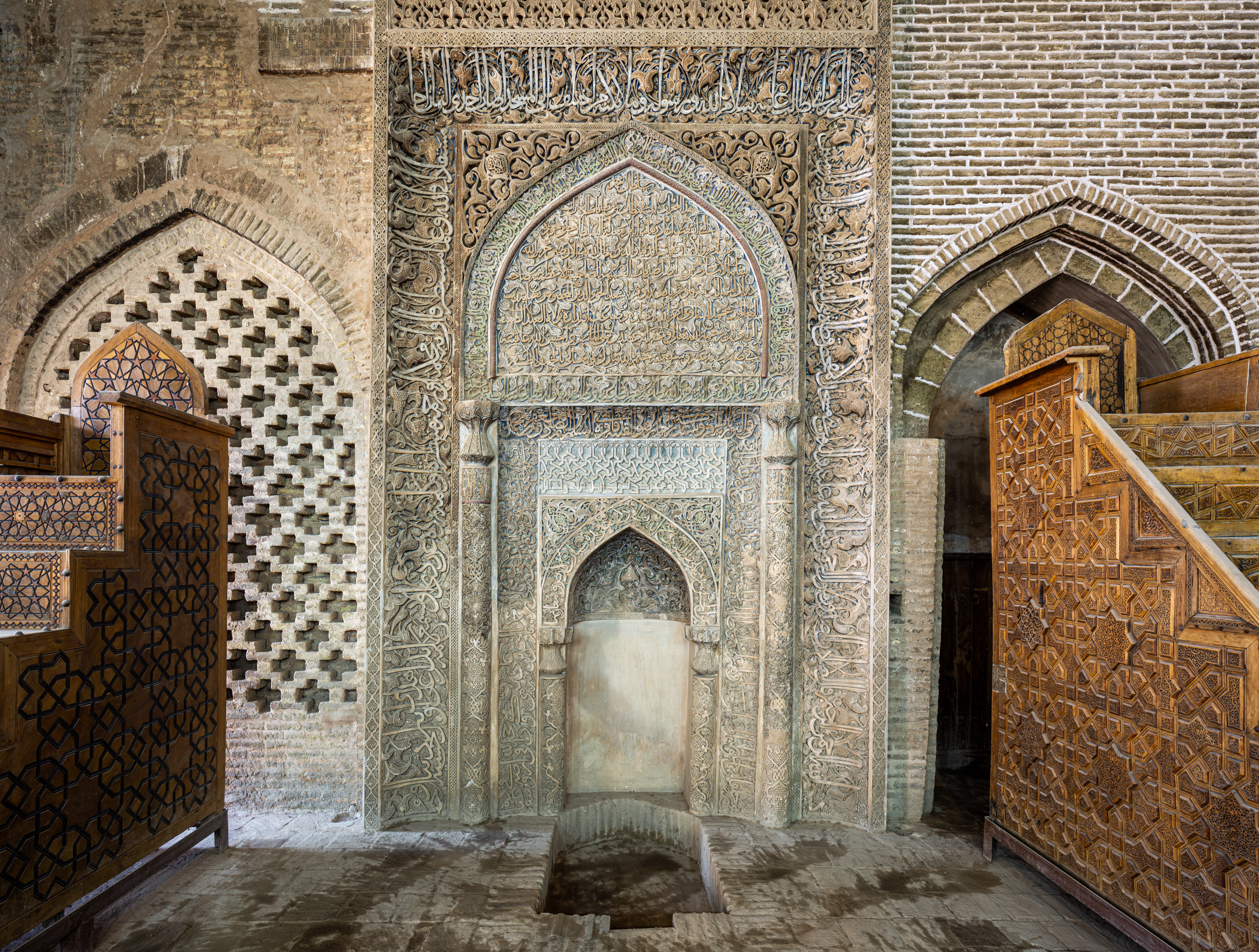
The stucco mihrab of Uljaytu (1310) in the Ilkhanid prayer hall

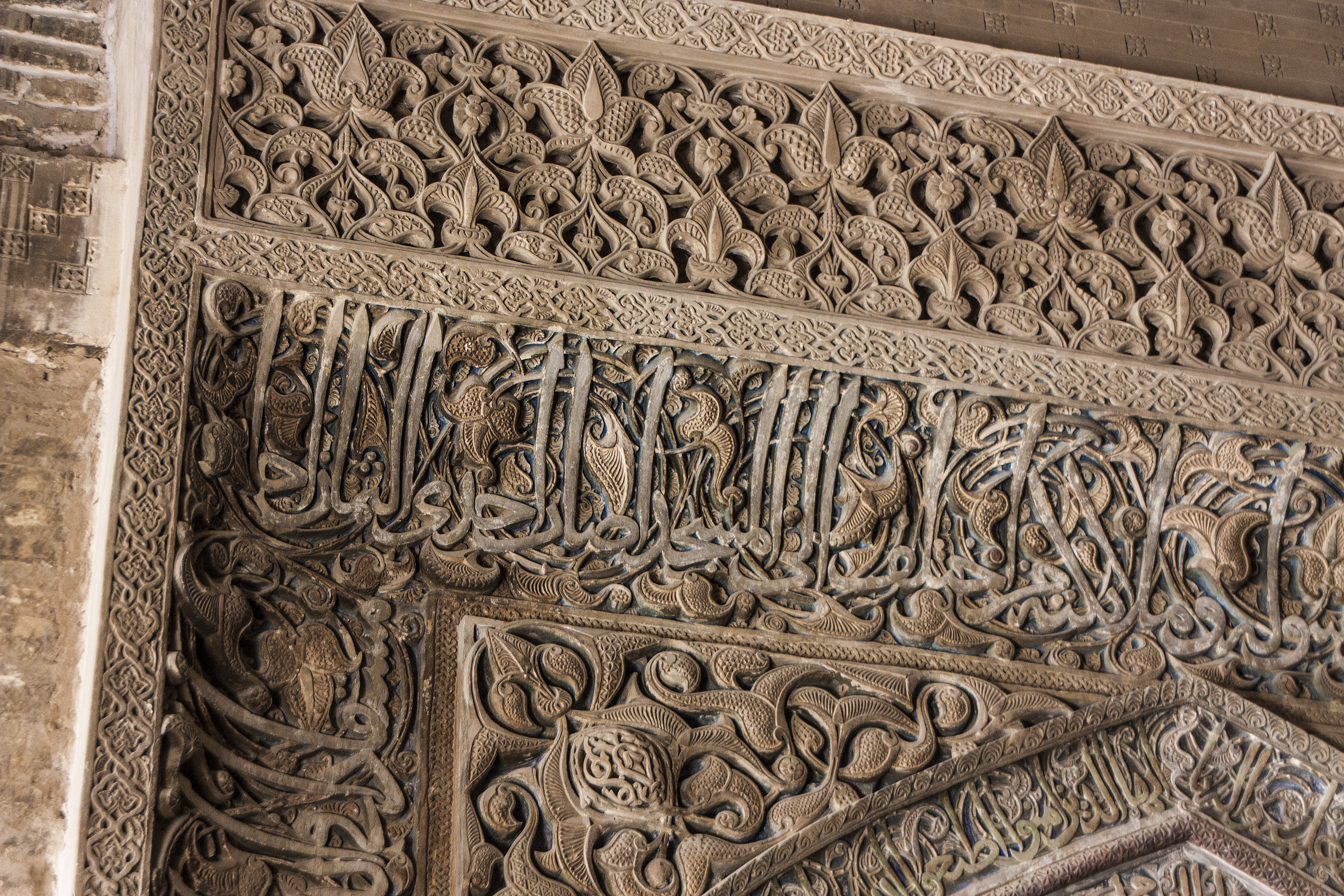
Details of the mihrab

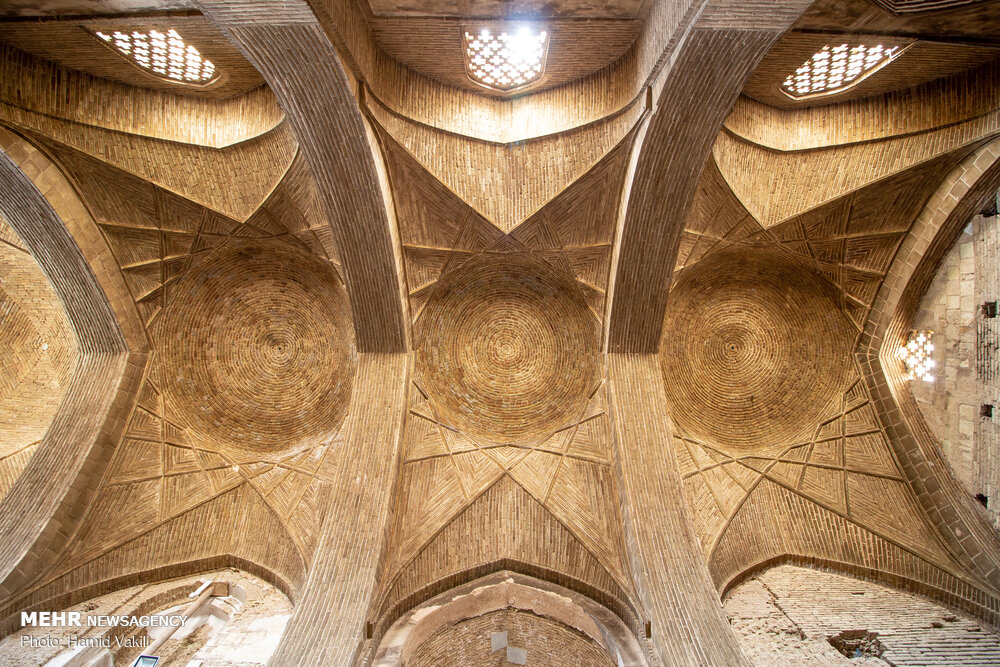
Tranverse vault ceiling in the Ilkhanid prayer hall

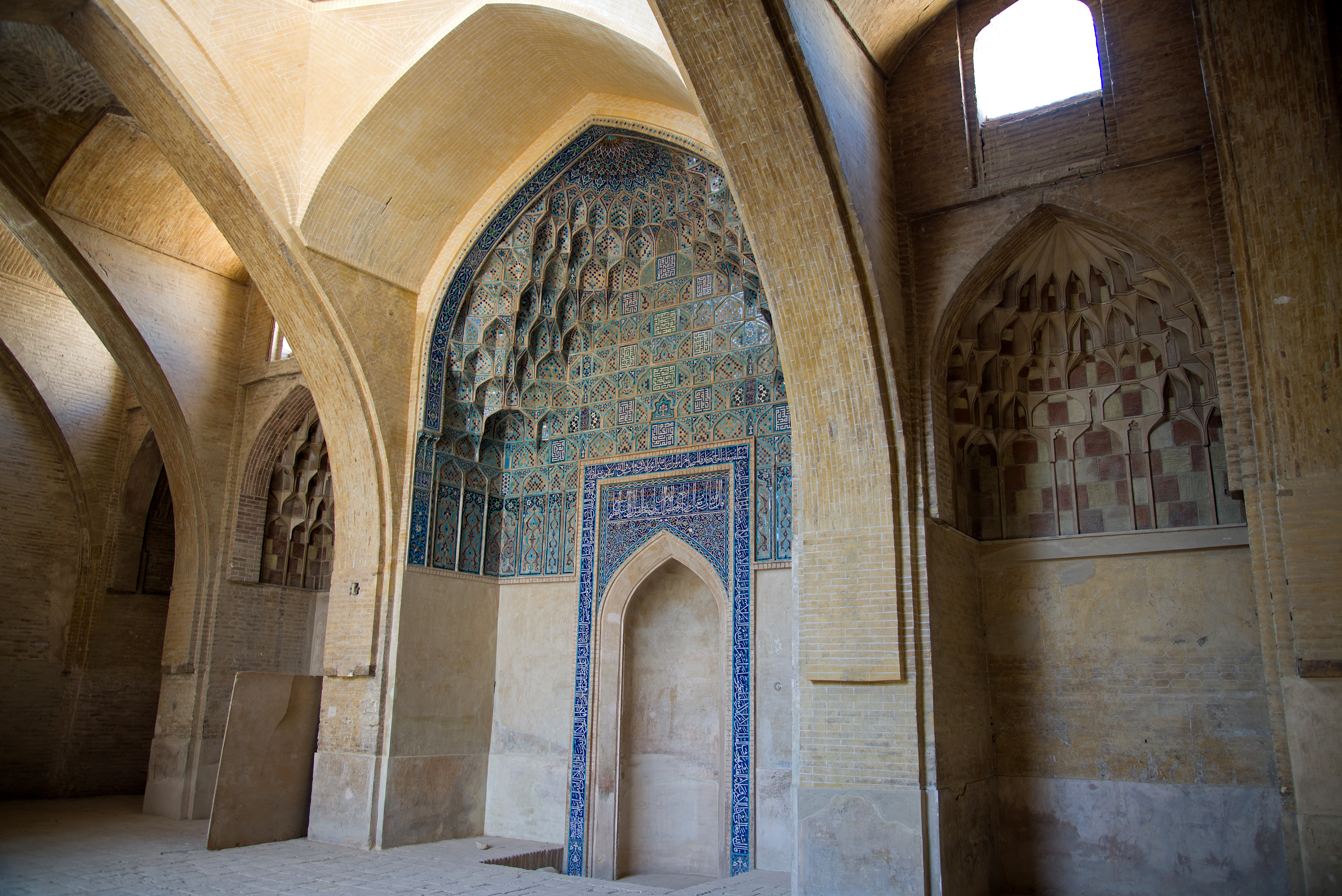
Mihrab and prayer space of the Muzaffarid Madrasa (14th century)

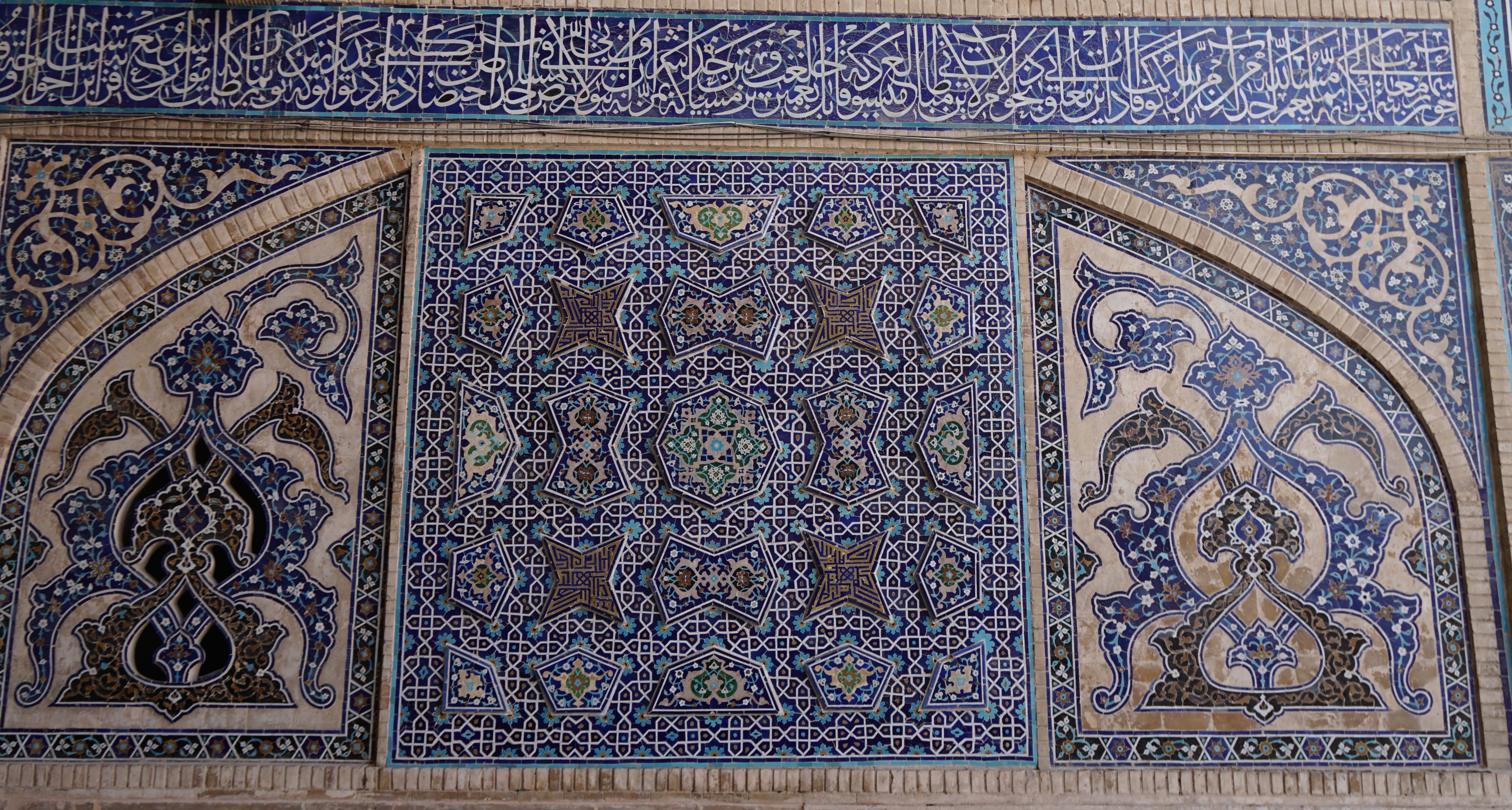
Part of the tile decoration in the southern iwan, added by Uzun Hasan in 1475–6

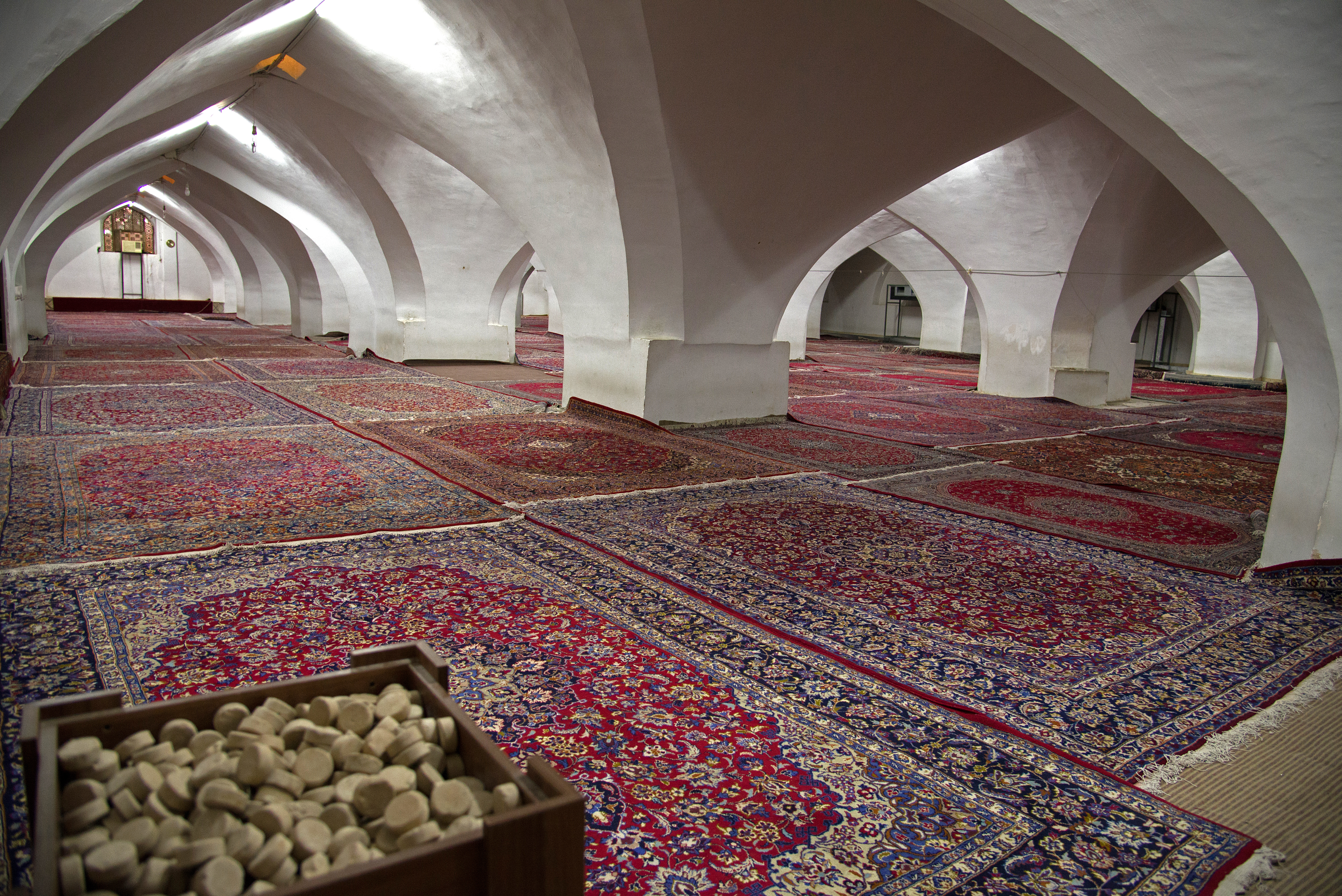
"Winter prayer hall" built by the Safavids, replacing an earlier Muzaffarid hall

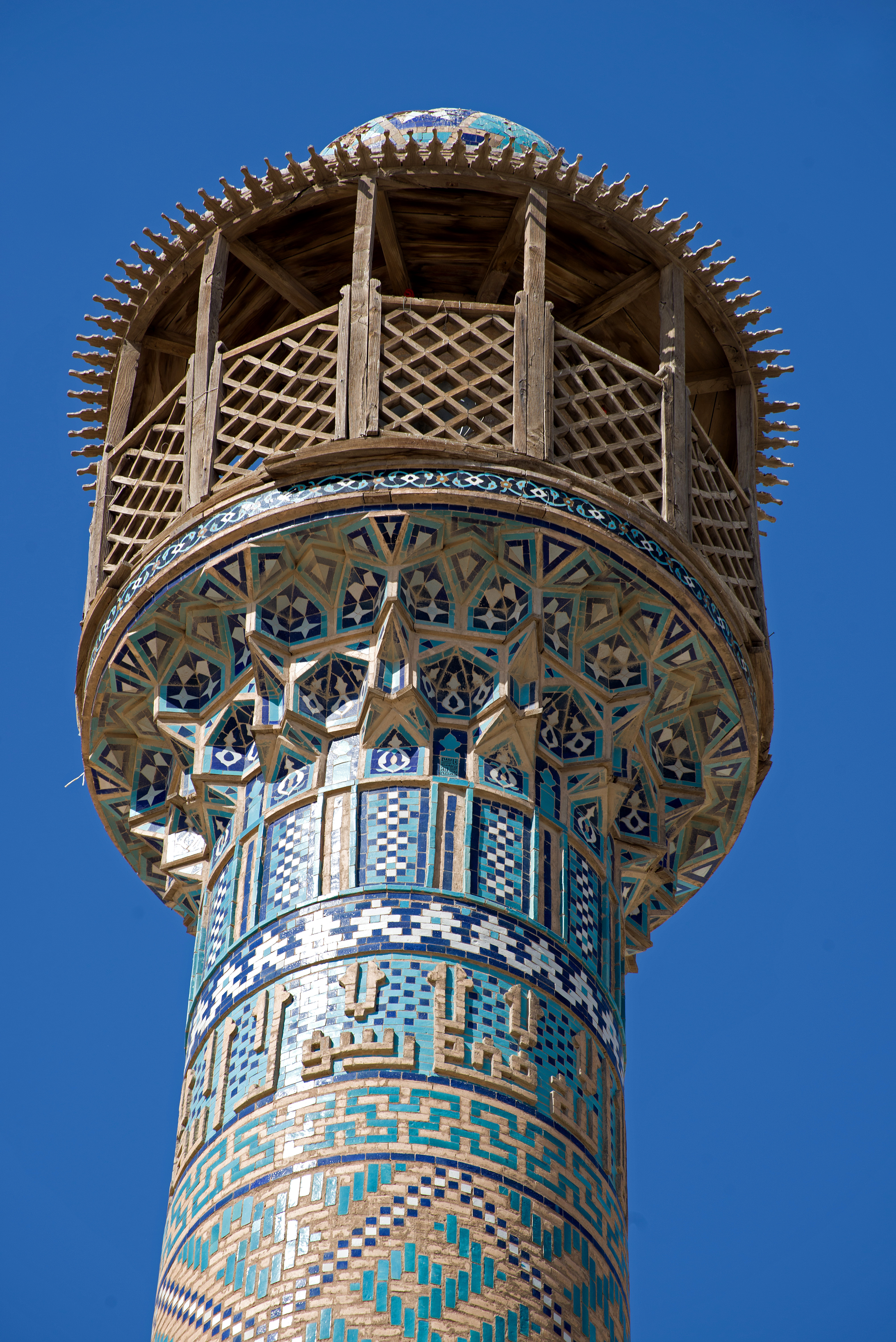
Detail of minaret and tile decoration from Safavid period

== Present day ==
The mosque today is an amalgamation of different styles and periods coalesced into one building, the details of which cannot always be easily dated. Its perimeter is now thoroughly enmeshed with the surrounding structures of the bazaar and the old city, such that it presents very few clear exterior façades.

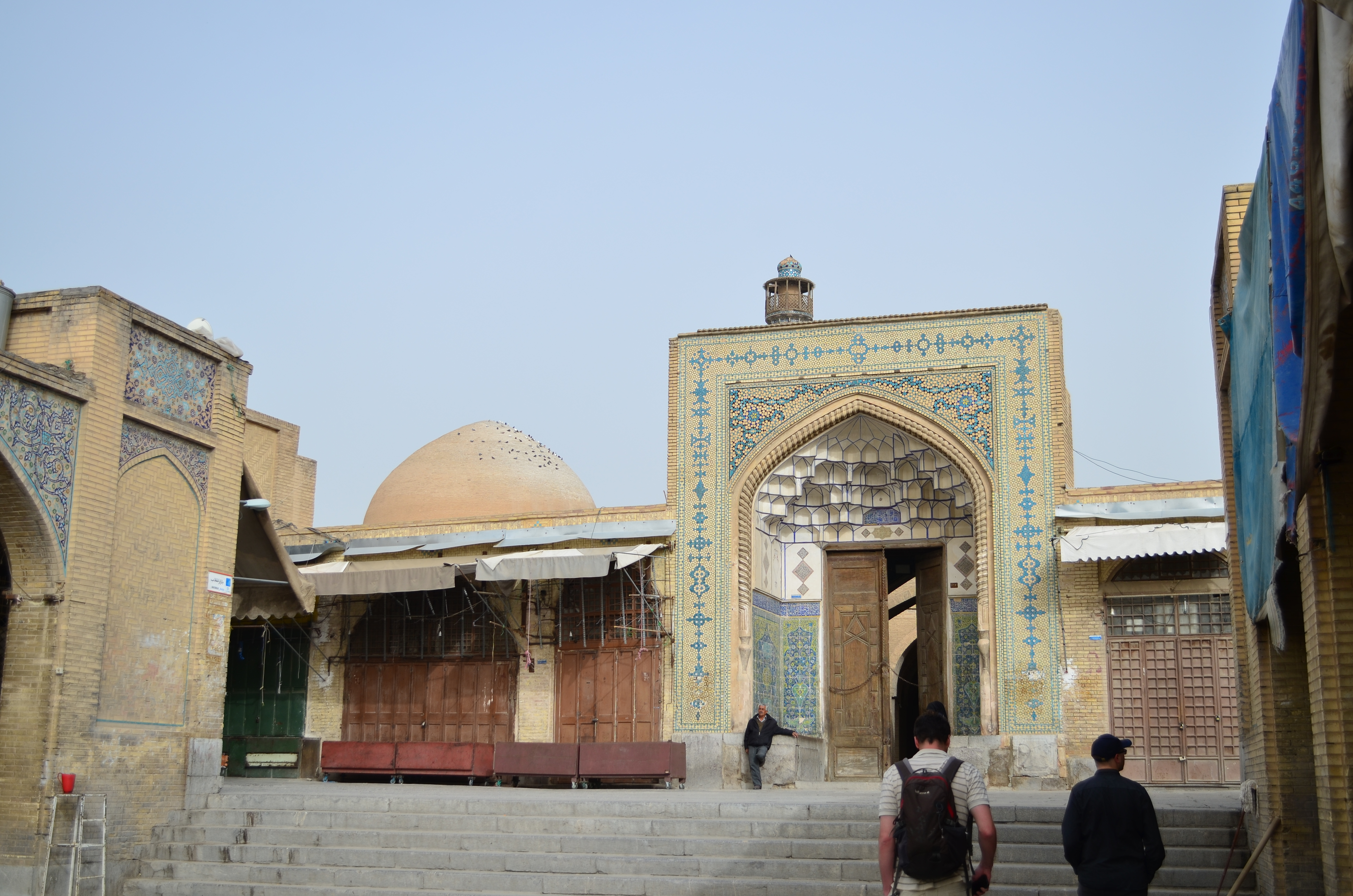
One of the entrances to the mosque today, on the west side

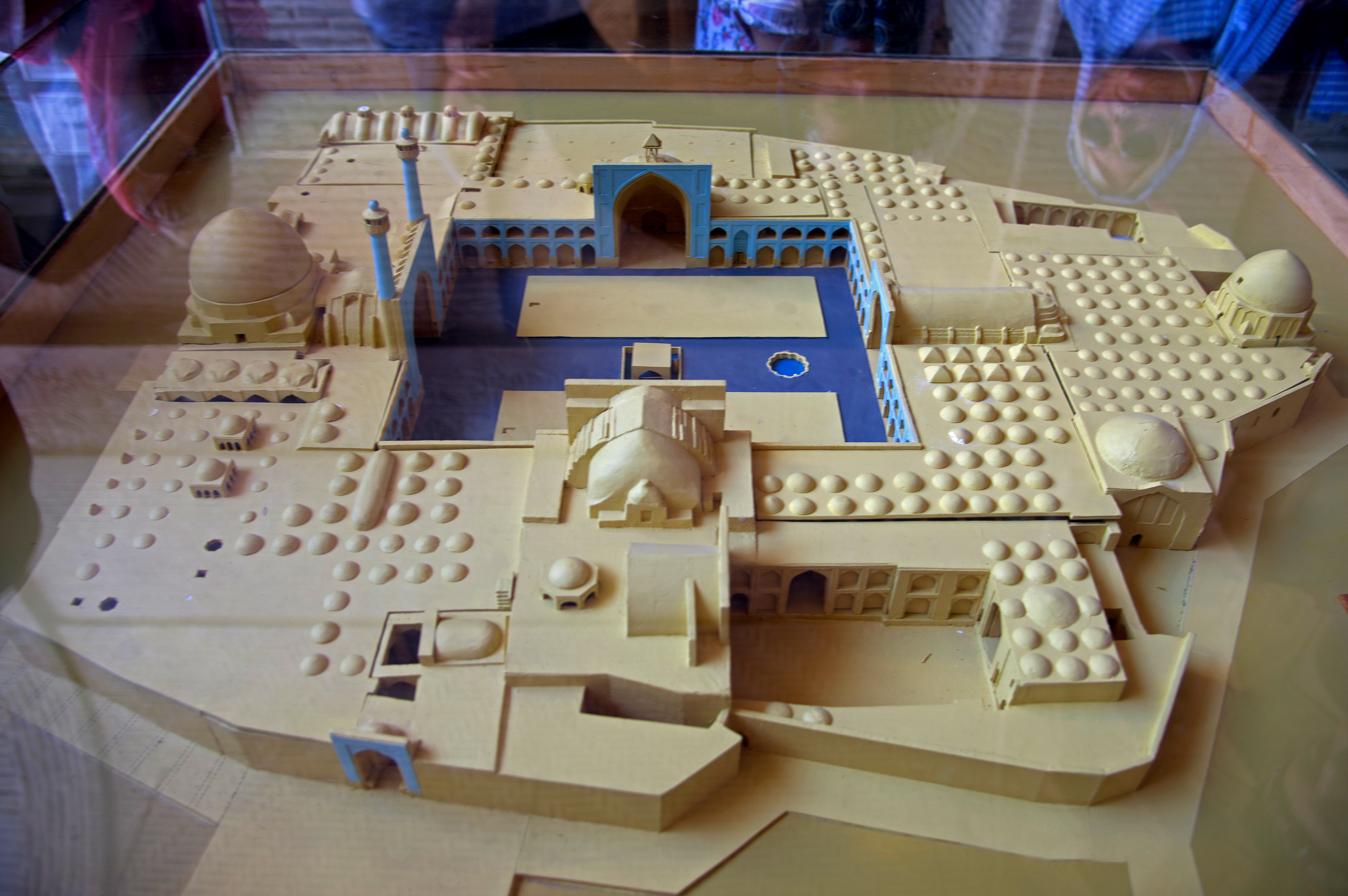
Model of the mosque today, showing its various elements from above

== See also ==
- Shia Islam in Iran
- List of mosques in Iran
- Persian domes
