= Berkyaruq =

Sultan of the Seljuk Empire from 1094 to 1105

Berkyaruq; برکیارق
- Sultan; Shahanshah
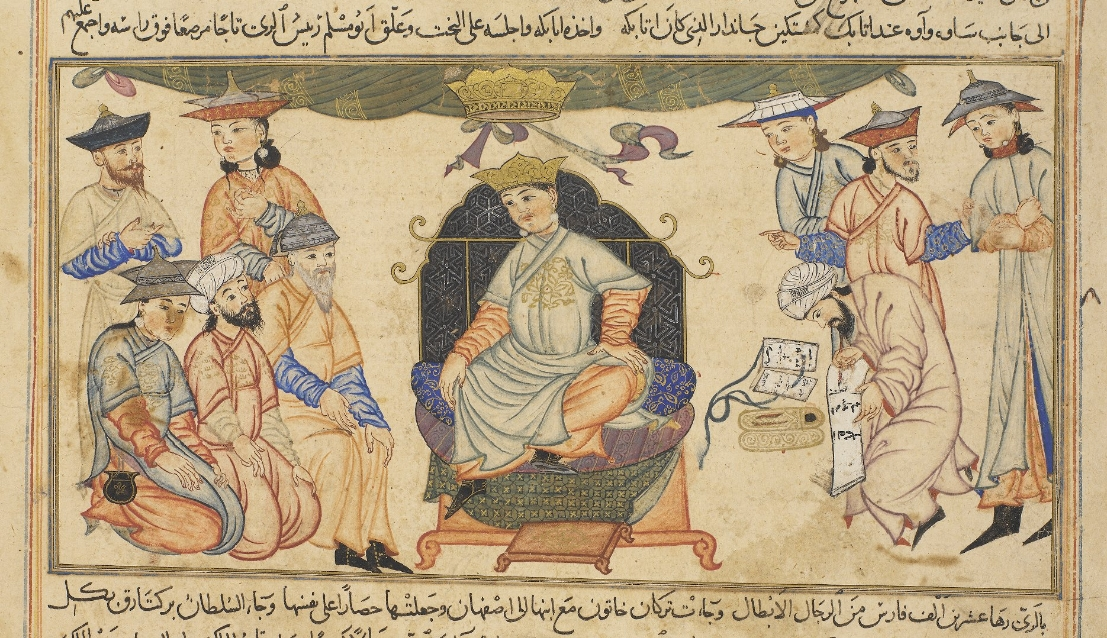
- Investiture scene of Berkyaruq, from the 14th-century book Jami' al-tawarikh

Sultan of the Seljuk Empire
- Reign: 1094–1105
- Predecessor: Mahmud I
- Successor: Malik-Shah II
- Born: 1079/80; Isfahan, Seljuk Empire
- Died: 1105 (aged 25); Borujerd, Seljuk Empire
- Issue: Malik-Shah II; Zubayda Khatun
Names
- Rukn al-Din Abu'l-Muzaffar Berkyaruq ibn Malikshah
- House: House of Seljuk
- Father: Malik-Shah I
- Mother: Zubayda Khatun
- Religion: Sunni Islam

Rukn al-Din Abu'l-Muzaffar Berkyaruq ibn Malikshah (Persian: ابو المظفر رکن الدین برکیارق بن ملکشاه, romanized: Rukn al-Dīn Abuʿl-Moẓaffar Berkyāruq ibn Malik-Šāh; 1079/80 – 1105), better known as Berkyaruq (برکیارق), was the fifth sultan (Note: In addition to sultan, the ancient Persian title of King of Kings (shahanshah) was also used by the Seljuks.) of the Seljuk Empire from 1094 to 1105.

The son of Malik-Shah I (r. 1072–1092), he reigned during the opening stages of the decline and fragmentation of the empire, which marked the rise of Turkoman atabegates and principalities, which would eventually stretch from Kirman to Anatolia and Syria. His reign was marked by internal strife, mainly against other Seljuk princes. By his death in 1105, his authority had largely vanished. His infant son Malik-Shah II briefly succeeded him, until he was killed by Berkyaruq's half-brother and rival Muhammad I Tapar (r. 1105–1118).

== Name ==
Berkyaruq is a Turkic word meaning "firm, unwavering light". Contrary to their Ghaznavid predecessors—who had largely abandoned their Turkic heritage in favour of Persian—the Seljuks maintained and took pride in their origins, carrying Turkic names such as Berkyaruq, Arslan Arghu or Sanjar.

== Background ==
Born in 1079 or 1080 in the Seljuk capital of Isfahan, Berkyaruq was the oldest son of Malik-Shah I (r. 1072–1092) and the latter's cousin, the Seljuk princess Zubayda Khatun. Berkyaruq was only thirteen at the time of his father's death in November 1092, meaning that there were no princes of age to inherit the vast Seljuk empire. Berkyaruq's half-brother Muhammad Tapar was eleven, while another half-brother named Mahmud was four. A brother of Malik-Shah titled Tutush I, who ruled Syria on his brother's behalf, claimed the throne as the only adult, but gained little support from the Turkic elite. Malik-Shah's death thus marks the start of the decline and fragmentation of the empire, with amirs and palace elites trying each to gain power by supporting one of his young sons as sultan. This would ultimately mark the start of Turkoman atabegates and principalities, which would later stretch from Kirman to Anatolia and Syria.

One of Malik-Shah's wives, Terken Khatun, in cooperation with the Seljuk vizier Taj al-Mulk, installed her four-year-old son Mahmud on the throne at Baghdad. She convinced the Abbasid caliph al-Mustazhir (r. 1094–1118) to have the khutba (friday sermon) read in Mahmud's name, and sent an army under the amir Qiwam al-Dawla Kirbuqa to take Isfahan and capture Berkyaruq. Meanwhile, the family and supporters of the deceased Seljuk vizier Nizam al-Mulk (known as the "Nizamiyya"), led by the Turkic slave-soldier (ghulam) Er-Ghush, supported Berkyaruq. They had Berkyaruq smuggled out of Isfahan and sent to his atabeg (guardian) Gumushtigin in Saveh and Aveh, who had him crowned at Ray.

== Reign ==
=== Initial challenges and consolidation of power ===
Map of the Seljuk Empire at the death of Malik-Shah I in 1092

Although Berkyaruq was generally supported by the Nizamiyya, the modern historian Clifford Edmund Bosworth states that "this does not necessarily imply that the Nizamiyya had a collective policy, for none of the sons of Nizam al-Mulk was his father's equal in ability, and opportunism and personal factors seem often to have swayed them". The Nizamiyya were most importantly looking to seek vengeance against Taj al-Mulk, who was believed to have been behind the death of his rival Nizam al-Mulk (which according to modern historian Andrew Peacock, was probably partly true). A battle took place between the two factions in January 1093, resulting in the defeat of Mahmud's supporters and the capture of Taj al-Mulk. Berkyaruq, aware of Taj al-Mulk's bureaucratic prowess, was willing to make him his vizier. Taj al-Mulk had even managed to appease a section of the Nizamiyya through bribery. Still, this was not enough: the Nizamiyya, thirsty for revenge, secured his execution on 12 February. Terken Khatun soon summoned the Seljuk prince Ismail ibn Yaquti to attack Berkyaruq. Although the former had raised an army of Turkoman from Azerbaijan and Arran, he was defeated and executed by Berkyaruq's atabeg Gumush-Tegin. Terken Khatun then tried to reach out to Tutush, but suddenly died in 1094, with her sickly son Mahmud dying a month later.

Map of Khurasan and Transoxiana

Berkyaruq also had to deal with his uncle Tutush, who invaded the Jazira and western Iran, seizing the city of Ray. He was, however, killed by Berkyaruq's forces near the same city on 25 February 1095. Berkyaruq thus managed to consolidate his authority in western Iran and Iraq, and was also acknowledged as the sultan by al-Mustazhir. During the chaos that ensued, Malik-Shah's brother Arghun Arslan conquered most of Khurasan (except the city of Nishapur), attempting to establish his own principality in the province. Berkyaruq first sent an army under his uncle Bori-Bars ibn Alp-Arslan in 1095 to conquer Khurasan, but the latter was captured and killed. He sent a second army under his half-brother Ahmad Sanjar in 1097, but before anything occurred Arghun Arslan was killed by one of his own ghulams, due to his brutal treatment of his subjects. Berkyaruq appointed Sanjar as the vassal ruler (malik) of Khurasan, giving him his own atabeg (Amir Qumaj) and vizier (al-Tughrai).

Berkyaruq then led an expedition as far east as Tirmidh, where he confirmed the Qarakhanids Sulayman-tegin and Mahmud-tegin as the vassal rulers of Transoxiana. He also appointed Qutb al-Din Muhammad as the new governor of the Central Asian region of Khwarazm, thus marking the start of the Khwarazmian dynasty. He spent seven months in the city of Balkh, and then returned to the west. However, after leaving his eastern possessions, the area was plunged into a series of revolts, including one by the Seljuk prince Dawlatshah. The name of Berkyaruq started to get excluded from the coins struck at Nishapur, which testifies to the slow disintegration of his rule in Khurasan. Preoccupied by continuous internal issues, Berkyaruq was unavailable to respond to the advent of the First Crusade in Syria in 1097. The crusaders besieged Antioch and sacked Ma'arrat al-Nu'man. Furthermore, Berkyaruq had little reason to help the Seljuks of Syria, who fought amongst themselves, dividing the country. The northern part was ruled by Fakhr al-Mulk Ridwan, and the southern part by Shams al-Muluk Duqaq. When the Crusaders entered Syria, Ridwan shifted his allegiance from Berkyaruq to the Fatimid Caliphate.

=== Conflict with Muhammad I Tapar ===
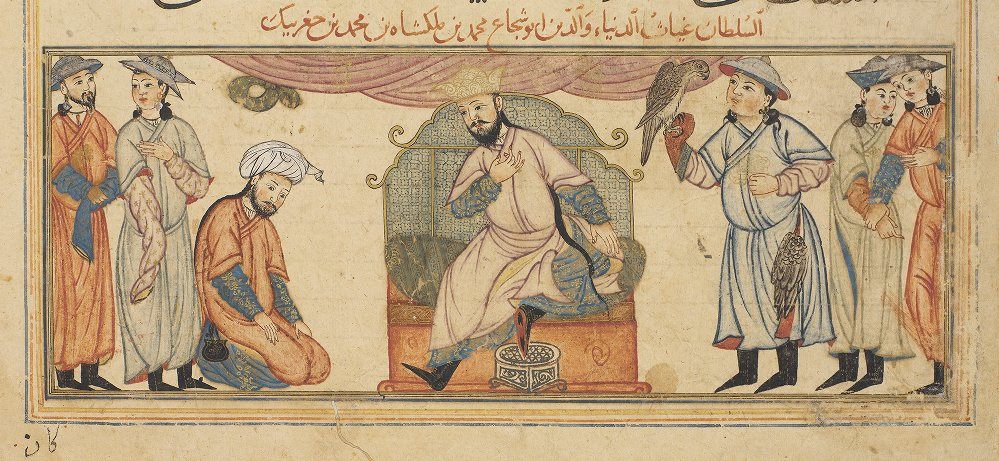
Investiture scene of Muhammad I Tapar, from the 14th-century book Jami' al-tawarikh

The most difficult challenge that Berkyaruq faced was the rebellion of his half-brother Muhammad in 1098 or 1099. The rebellion had been encouraged by Nizam al-Mulk's son Mu'ayyid al-Mulk, who had formerly served Berkyaruq and played a key-role in the defeat of Tutush. After his dismissal by Berkyaruq, he entered into the service of Muhammad, who appointed him as his vizier. Mu'ayyid al-Mulk made use of his newfound position to exact vengeance on his rivals, which was made easier because Muhammad had yet to reach adulthood (approximately 17 years old at the time). The Nizamiyya and the prominent families of Isfahan also joined Muhammad, stopping Berkyaruq from entering the city. The rebellion was launched from Muhammad's base at the city of Ganja in Arran, which had been given to him as an iqta' (land grant) by Berkyaruq back in 1093.

Muhammad's capture of Ray exposed the vulnerability of Berkyaruq's realm. Sa'd al-Dawla Gawhara'in, the shihna (military administrator) of Baghdad, soon joined Muhammad, which implies that the city was also added to his domain. Nevertheless, the five-year war continued to be indecisive, with Baghdad repeatedly changing hands. Even with the support of Sanjar (who despised Berkyaruq), Muhammad was unable to defeat his rival. Berkyaruq's authority continued to weaken, and by 1104, with his treasury exhausted, he was forced to sue for peace. A treaty was subsequently made, which acknowledged Muhammad as the ruler of southern Iraq, northern Iran, the Diyar Bakr, Mosul and Syria, while Berkyaruq was acknowledged as the ruler of the rest of Iran (including Isfahan) and Baghdad. The treaty, however, did most likely not display the true circumstances of the situation. The following year (1105), there were no coin mints citing the name of Berkyaruq in the central Islamic lands. En route to Isfahan, he died of tuberculosis at the age of 25 near the town of Borujerd, and was succeeded by his infant son Malik-Shah II. Baghdad was subsequently captured by Muhammad, who had Malik-Shah II killed.

== Sources ==
- Blake, Stephen P. (2002). Shahjahanabad: The Sovereign City in Mughal India 1639–1739. Cambridge University Press. ISBN 978-0-521-52299-1.
- Bosworth, C. E. (1968). "The Political and Dynastic History of the Iranian World (A.D. 1000–1217)". In Frye, R. N. (ed.). The Cambridge History of Iran, Volume 5: The Saljuq and Mongol periods. Cambridge: Cambridge University Press. pp. 1–202. ISBN 978-0-521-06936-6. Archived from the original on 2022-01-23.
- Bosworth, Clifford Edmund (1978). "K̲h̲wārazm-S̲h̲āhs". In van Donzel, E.; Lewis, B.; Pellat, Ch. & Bosworth, C. E. (eds.). The Encyclopaedia of Islam, Second Edition. Volume IV: Iran–Kha. Leiden: E. J. Brill. ISBN 978-90-04-05745-6. OCLC 758278456.
- Bosworth, C. E. (1986). "Anūštigin Ḡaṛčaʾī". Encyclopaedia Iranica, Vol. II, Fasc. 2. p. 140.
- Bosworth, C. E. (1988). "Barkīāroq". In Yarshater, Ehsan (ed.). Encyclopædia Iranica. Vol. III/8: Bardesanes–Bayhaqī, Ẓahīr-al-Dīn. London and New York: Routledge & Kegan Paul. pp. 800–801. ISBN 978-0-71009-120-8.
- Bosworth, C. E. (1997). "Ebn Dārost, Tāj al-Molk Abu'l-Ḡanā'em Marzbān". In Yarshater, Ehsan (ed.). Encyclopædia Iranica. Vol. VIII/1: Ebn ʿAyyāš–Economy V. London and New York: Routledge & Kegan Paul. pp. 12–13. ISBN 978-1-56859-050-9.
- Bosworth, C.E. (2001). "Notes on Some Turkish Names in Abu 'l-Faḍl Bayhaqī's Tārīkh-i Masʿūdī". Oriens. 36. Brill: 299–313. doi:10.2307/1580488. JSTOR 1580488.
- Cahen, Cl (1960). "Barkyārūḳ". In Gibb, H. A. R.; Kramers, J. H.; Lévi-Provençal, E.; Schacht, J.; Lewis, B. & Pellat, Ch. (eds.). The Encyclopaedia of Islam, Second Edition. Volume I: A–B. Leiden: E. J. Brill. p. 1051-1053. OCLC 495469456.
- Özaydın, Abdülkerim (1992). "Berkyaruk". TDV Encyclopedia of Islam, Vol. 5 (Balaban – Beşi̇r Ağa) (in Turkish). Istanbul: Presidency of Religious Affairs, Centre for Islamic Studies. ISBN 978-975-389-432-6.
- Peacock, A. C. S. (2015). The Great Seljuk Empire. Edinburgh University Press. pp. 1–378. ISBN 978-0-7486-3826-0.
- Richards, D.S. (2014). The Annals of the Saljuq Turks: Selections from al-Kamil fi'l-Ta'rikh of Ibn al-Athir. Routledge. ISBN 978-1-317-83254-6.
- Tetley, Gillies (2008). The Ghaznavid and Seljuk Turks: Poetry as a Source for Iranian History. Routledge. ISBN 978-1-134-08438-8.
- Tor, Deborah (2012). "The Long Shadow of Pre-Islamic Iranian Rulership: Antagonism or Assimilation?". In Bernheimer, Teresa; Silverstein, Adam J. (eds.). Late Antiquity: Eastern Perspectives. Oxford: Oxbow. pp. 145–163. ISBN 978-0-906094-53-2.
- Van Donzel, Emeri Johannes (1994). Islamic Desk Reference. Leiden: E. J. Brill. ISBN 978-90-04-09738-4.

Preceded by Malik-Shah I	Sultan of Seljuk Empire; 1094–1105	Succeeded by Malik Shah II
