= Mahmud II (disambiguation) =

Mahmud II (1785–1839) was the 30th Sultan of the Ottoman Empire.

Mahmud II may also refer to:

- Mahmud II (Seljuq sultan) (c. 1105 – 1131), Seljuq sultan of Baghdad
- Mahmud II (mansa) (fl. 1481–1496, ruler of the Mali Empire
- Mahmud II of Johor (1675–1699), Sultan of Johor, Pahang and Lingga
- Mahmud II of Kalat (1864–1931), Khan of the princely state of Kalat

== See also ==
- Mahmud (disambiguation)
- Mahmud I (disambiguation)
