= Malik-Shah II =

Sultan of the Seljuk Empire from 1104 to 1105

Sultan of the Great Seljuq Empire
- Reign: 22 December 1104 – 13 February 1105
- Coronation: 12 January 1105
- Predecessor: Berkyaruq
- Successor: Muhammad I Tapar
- Born: unknown
- Died: unknown
Names
- Mu'izz ad-Din Malik Shah II
- Father: Berkyaruq
- Religion: Islam (Sunni)

Malik-Shah II (Persian: ملک شاه دوم) or Mu'izz ad-Din Malik Shah II was Seljuq Sultan in Baghdad during 1105. He was the grandson of Malik Shah I, and was theoretically the head of the dynasty, although his relative Ahmad Sanjar in Khorasan probably held more effective power. He was deposed and killed by his uncle Muhammed Tapar.

Preceded by Berkyaruq	Sultan of Great Seljuq; 1105	Succeeded by Muhammad I of Great Seljuq
