= Taj al-Mulk =

Seljuk courtier

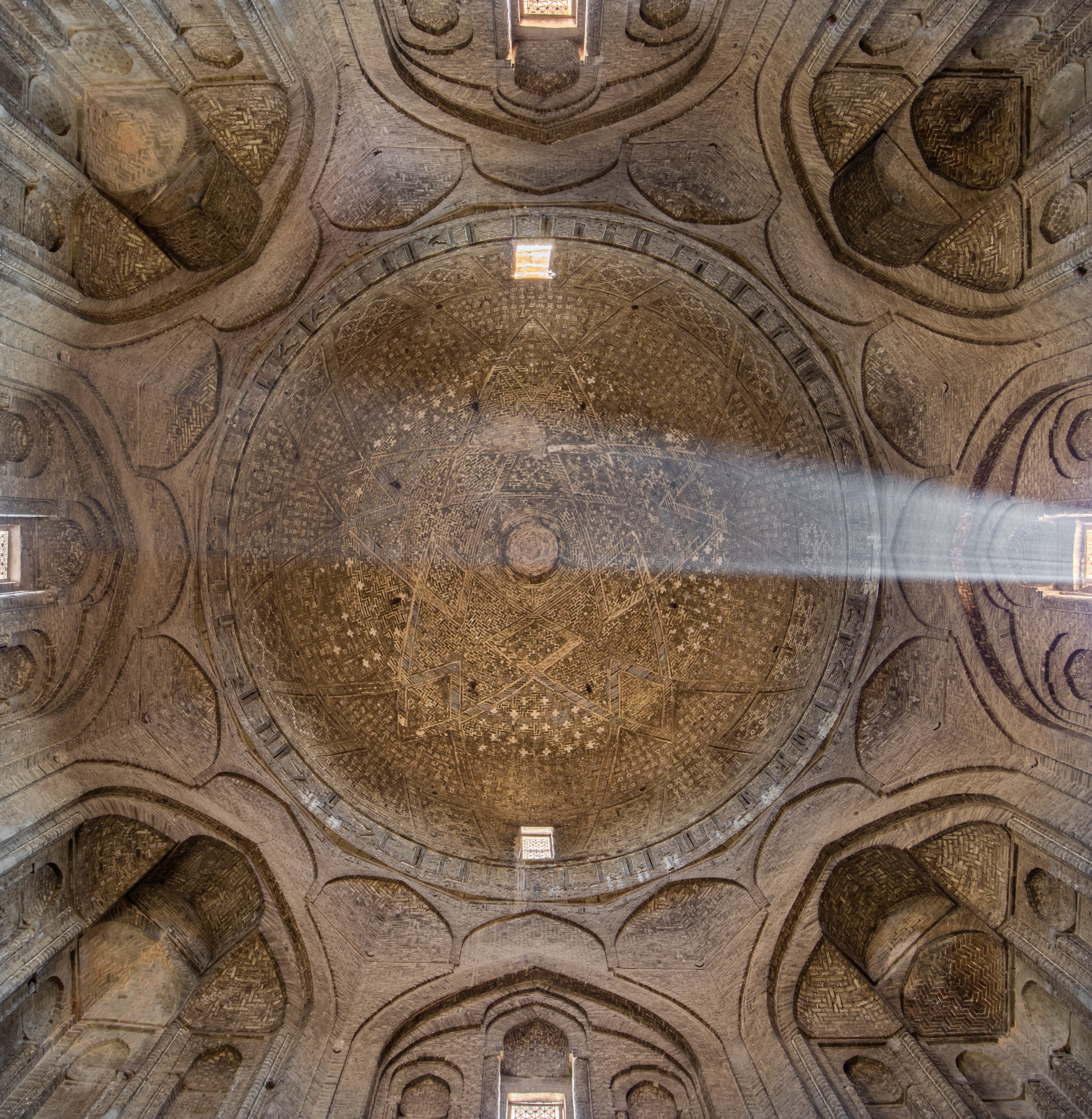
North dome in the Friday mosque of Isfahan, Iran, added in 1088–89 by Seljuk vizier Taj al-Mulk.

Taj al-Mulk Abu'l Ghana'em Marzban ibn Khosrow Firuz Shirazi (Persian: تاج‌الملک ابوالغنائم مرزبان بن خسرو فیروز), better simply known as Taj al-Mulk (تاج الملک) was a Seljuk courtier during the reigns of Malik-Shah I and his son Berkyaruq.

Of Persian descent, he was unofficially the vizier of Seljuk Empire for not more than 7 months.

== Life ==
He unofficially became the vizier of Seljuk Empire after the death of Malik-Shah. Taj al-Mulk was from an old noble family of Fars region. Not much is known about his life before his post in Seljuq government, but his biographers praised him for his competence, knowledge and fluency, which shows he had enough education. He was at first, in service of Imad al-Dowla Sawtekin, a local Seljuq amir. Impressed by Taj al-Mulk's competency, the amir introduced him to the Seljuq Sultan and he entered the court.

== Vizier ==
Judging by the primary sources, it seems that he intended to become the vizier from the beginning. After gaining the support of Terkan Khatun, he built a tomb for Shaykh Abu Ishaq-i Shirazi, and a school in Baghdad (known as Madrasa-i Tajiya) in order to gain some support from the masses. He slowly and carefully started his opposition to Nizam al-Mulk. Helped by some other courtiers, his goal was to depose Nizam al-Mulk, though Nizam al-Mulk didn't take them seriously, and the Sultan himself wasn't able to depose Nizam al-Mulk.

He finally gained a chance to increase the disagreements between Nizam al-Mulk and the Sultan. Although both Nizam al-Mulk and the Sultan were in agreement about the future Sultan, Berkyaruq, Taj al-Mulk supported Mahmoud, the child of Terkan Khatun.

== Isma'ili ==
Some primary sources such as Abd al-Jalil Qazvini Razi claimed that he was an Isma'ili and mentioned a story about his pact with Hassan-i Sabbah, which explain his enmity toward Nizam al-Mulk. Beside that, Nizam al-Mulk warned Sultan about "those who hide their true goals and intend to depose the vizier and the Abbasid Caliph" in his work, Siyasatnama.

He was responsible to deliver Sultan Malik-Shah's harsh letter to Nizam al-Mulk, which Nizam al-Mulk answered with harsh words as well. Malik-Shah, angry of Nizam al-Mulk's harsh words, and was preparing himself for a travel to Baghdad. When they reached Nahavand, Nizam al-Mulk was assassinated by an Isma'ili agent. Primary sources explicitly mentioned that the assassination of Nizam al-Mulk was orchestrated by Taj al-Mulk, making it likely that Malik-Shah was aware of it.

The deposition of Nizam al-Mulk was a win for both Tarkan Khatun and her supporters, as well as the Isma'ilis who enjoyed the support of Taj al-Mulk. When the Sultan reached Baghdad, Taj al-Mulk prohibited the soldiers from entering the houses of Baghdad's population and looting the city. He also bought ten days for al-Muqtadi, who had to leave the city at the order of Malik-Shah. But the subsequent events weren't in favor of Taj al-Mulk. Malik-Shah suddenly died only a month and a few days after the death of Nizam al-Mulk. In the following civil war between Berkyaruq (the official heir) and Malik-Ismail (supported by Tarkan Khatun), the latter was defeated in a battle near Boroujerd. Taj al-Mulk was arrested, and Berkyaruq (who was aware of his competency) at first decided to grant him the post of viziership, but he was assassinated by the supporters of Nizam al-Mulk who considered him responsible for the death of Nizam al-Mulk.

== Sources ==
- Edmund Bosworth, C. (1997). "Ebn Dārost, Tāj al-Molk Abu'l-Ḡanā'em Marzbān". Encyclopaedia Iranica, Vol. VIII, Fasc. 1. pp. 12–13.
