= Tomb of Nizam al-Mulk =

11th century tomb in Isfahan, Iran

- آرامگاه خواجه نظام‌الملک
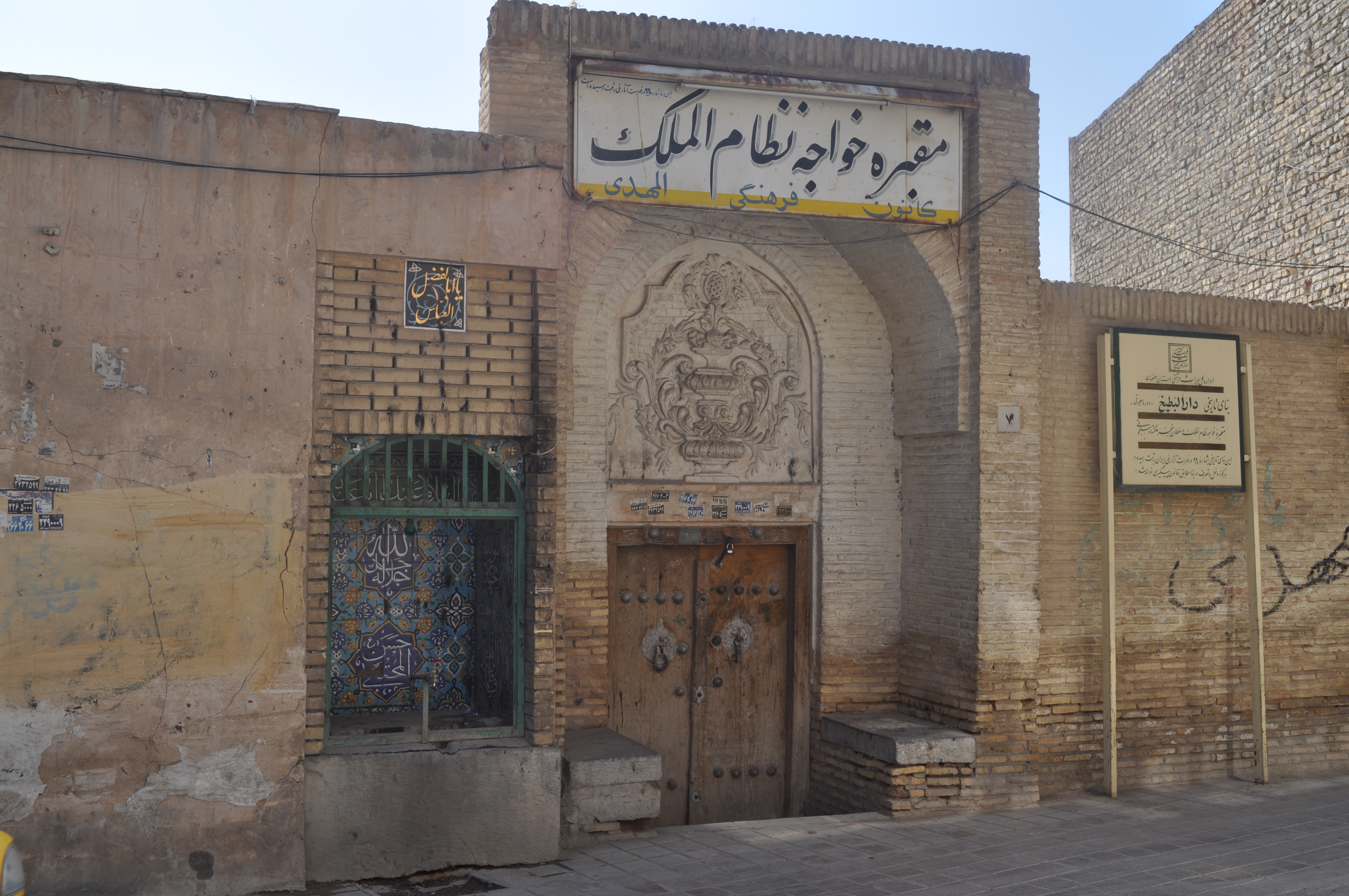
- Nizam al-Mulk tomb

- Location of the tomb in Iran

Religion
- Affiliation: Sunni Islam
- Ecclesiastical or organisational status: Tomb
- Status: Active

Location
- Location: Isfahan, Isfahan province, Iran
- Interactive map of Tomb of Nizam al-Mulk
- Coordinates: 32°39′33″N 51°41′27″E

Architecture
- Type: Mausoleum
- Style: Seljuk
- Completed: c. 1090s CE
- Materials: Marble

The Tomb of Nizam al-Mulk (Persian: آرامگاه نظام‌الملک, romanized: Aramgah-e Nezamolmolk) is a tomb and resting place of Nizam al-Mulk, a powerful vizier of two Seljuq sultans. The tomb is located in the Ahmadabad quarter of Isfahan, Isfahan province, Iran.

== Description ==
Completed in the c. 1090s CE, beside his gravestone there are two other gravestones which belong to Malik-Shah I and his wife, Turkan Khatun, who may have had a hand in Nizam's murder.

Besides the many changes in the garden and structure of tomb, the three valuable gravestones have also been changed. The current simple gravestones date from the Safavid era. No names are mentioned on them, perhaps by intention, and there are some sentences from the Quran on them. The marble gravestone of Nizam al-Mulk is 2 metres (6 ft 7 in) long by 35 centimetres (14 in) wide and 38 centimetres (15 in) high.

== Gallery ==
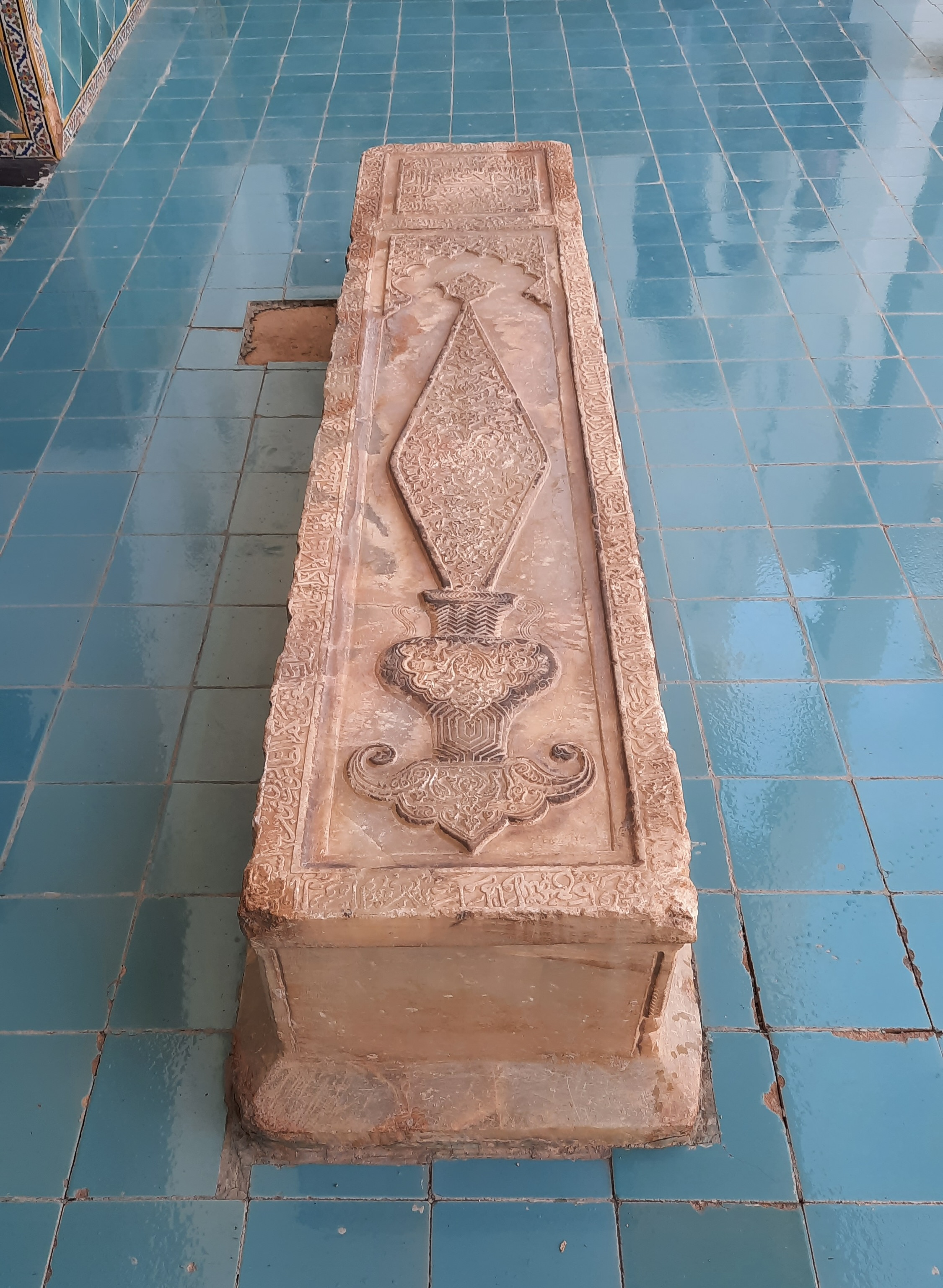
The marble gravestone, 2022

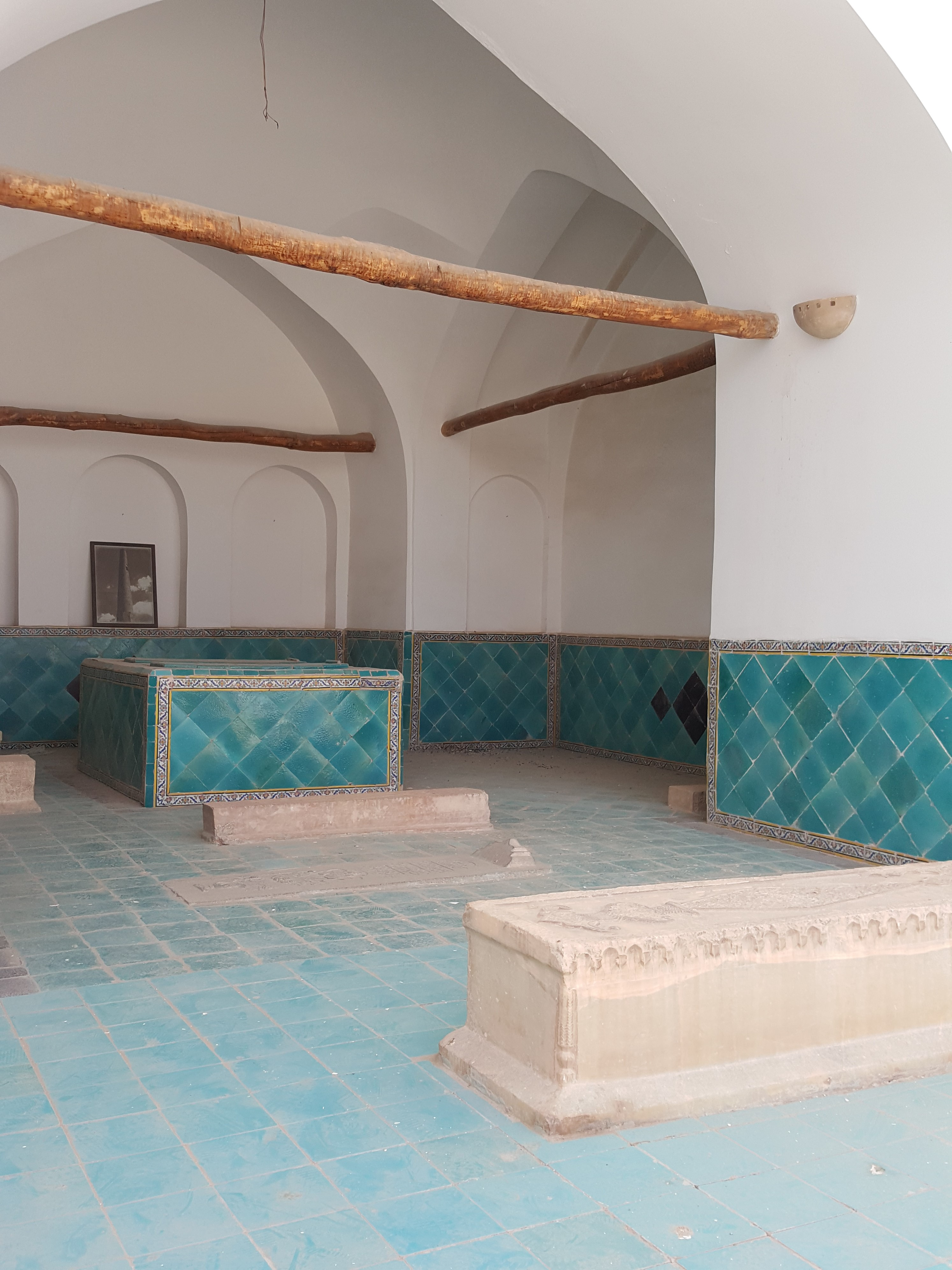
Interior of the tomb

== See also ==
- List of mausoleums in Iran
- List of historical structures in Isfahan
