= Mahmudi-ye Bala =

Mahmudi-ye Bala محمودي بالا
- Village
- Location within Iran
- Coordinates: 31°16′12″N 61°45′39″E
- Country: Iran
- Province: Sistan and Baluchestan
- County: Hirmand
- Bakhsh: Qorqori
- Rural District: Qorqori

Population (2006)
  - Total: 28
- Time zone: UTC+3:30 (IRST)
  - Summer (DST): UTC+4:30 (IRDT)

Mahmudi-ye Bala (Persian: محمودي بالا, also Romanized as Maḩmūdī-ye Bālā; also known as Maḩmūdī) is a village in Qorqori Rural District, Qorqori District, Hirmand County, Sistan and Baluchestan Province, Iran. At the 2006 census, its population was 28, in 6 families.
