= Jahangir Mahmoudi =

Iranian activist

Jahangir Mahmoudi is an Iranian lawyer, human rights activist and politician.

== Early life ==
Mahmoudi is the founder of "Khuzestan defenders party". In late August 2004, he was arrested and jailed in Ahvaz, Iran due to his opposition to the Iranian regime.

On August 25, 2010, officials from the Special Clerical Court stated that Jahangir Mahmoudi had been arrested as a result of his intentions to represent a number of political prisoners after repeated inquiries by his wife. Mahmoudi is currently being held at the Isfahan Prison. The trials of the political prisoners will continue without the presence of their lawyers.

== See also ==
- Khuzestan
