= Mahmudi (cloth) =

Fine cotton cloth produced in India

Mahmudi, or Maḥmūdī, was a fine cotton variety cloth produced in India.

== Mentions ==
The Ain-i-Akbari mentions the Mahmudi among cotton cloths.

== Fabric ==
It was a superior quality cloth finer than contemporary varieties such as longcloth. Various sources describe it as muslin. Mahmudi was also used for various embroidery base such as chikan.

== See also ==
- Khasa (cloth)
