= Mahmudi, Howmeh =

Mahmudi محمودي
- Village
- Location within Iran
- Coordinates: 26°58′38″N 57°07′31″E
- Country: Iran
- Province: Hormozgan
- County: Minab
- Bakhsh: Central
- Rural District: Howmeh

Population (2006)
  - Total: 587
- Time zone: UTC+3:30 (IRST)
  - Summer (DST): UTC+4:30 (IRDT)

Mahmudi (Persian: محمودي, also Romanized as Maḩmūdī) is a village in Howmeh Rural District, in the Central District of Minab County, Hormozgan Province, Iran. At the 2006 census, its population was 587, in 108 families.
