= Mahmudi, Baft =

Mahmudi محمودي
- Village
- Location within Iran
- Coordinates: 29°09′17″N 56°38′02″E
- Country: Iran
- Province: Kerman
- County: Baft
- Bakhsh: Central
- Rural District: Bezenjan

Population (2006)
  - Total: 28
- Time zone: UTC+3:30 (IRST)
  - Summer (DST): UTC+4:30 (IRDT)

Mahmudi (Persian: محمودي, also Romanized as Maḩmūdī; also known as Nīmrū Maḩmūdī) is a village in Bezenjan Rural District, in the Central District of Baft County, Kerman Province, Iran. At the 2006 census, its population was 28, in 5 families.
