= Mahmud I (Seljuk sultan) =

Sultan of the Sejuk Empire from 1092 to 1094

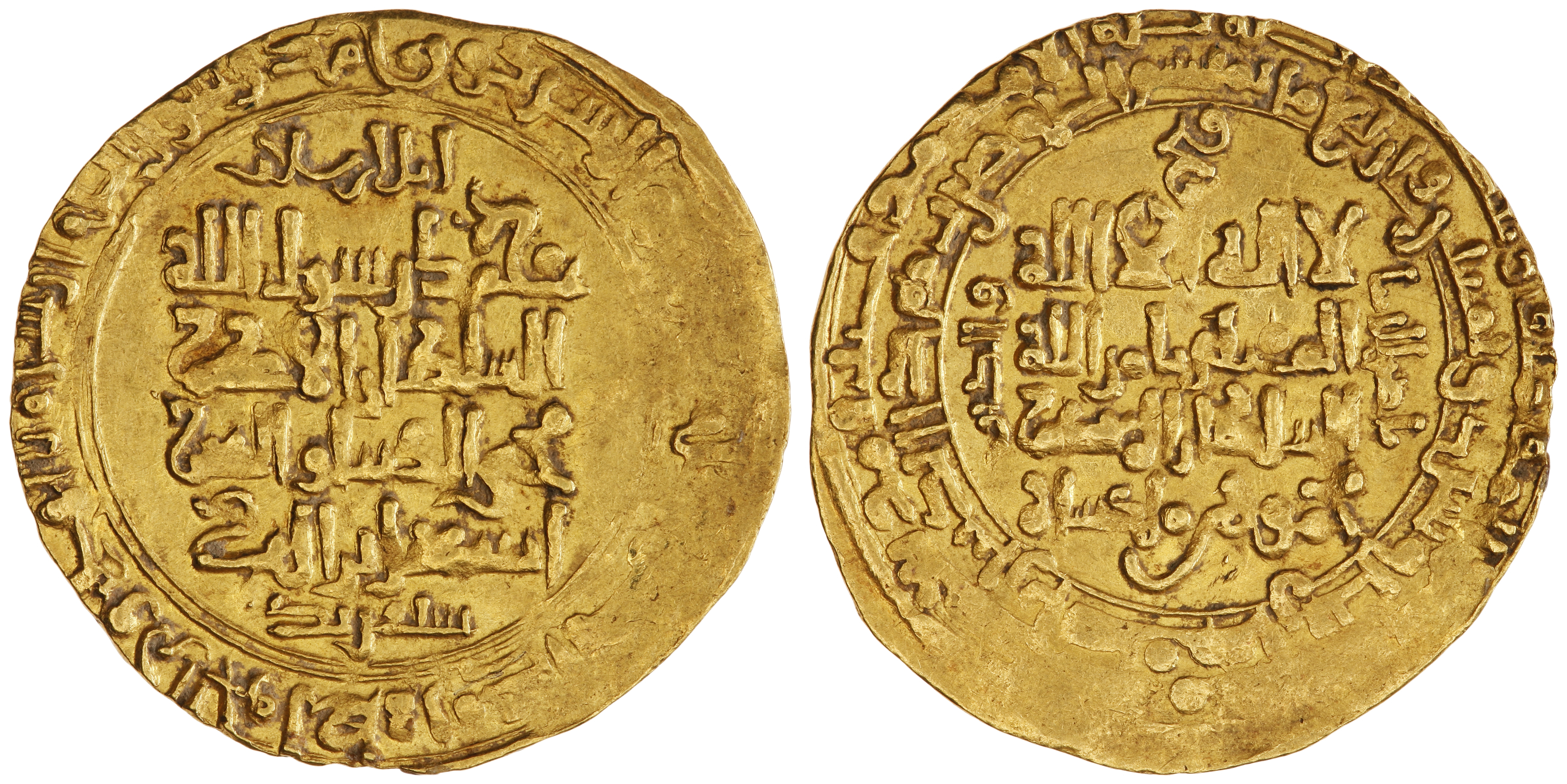
- Gold dinar of Mahmud I, minted at Isfahan in 1093 or 1094, citing caliph al-Muqtadi.

Sultan of the Seljuk Empire
- Reign: 19 November 1092 – October 1094
- Coronation: 19 November 1092
- Predecessor: Malik Shah I
- Successor: Berkyaruq
- Regent: Terken Khatun
- Born: 1088
- Died: October 1094 (aged 5–6)
Names
- Nasir al-Din Mahmud I
- Father: Malik Shah I
- Mother: Terken Khatun
- Religion: Sunni Islam

Nasir al-Din Mahmud I (Persian: ناصرالدین محمود یکم)(1088–1094) was an infant sultan of the Seljuk Empire from 1092 to 1094, with most power held by his mother Terken Khatun. He was a younger son of the former sultan Malik Shah I and proclaimed sultan at Baghdad by the caliph al-Muqtadi (r. 1075–1094). Under his notional reign, the empire built by his father and Alp Arslan fragmented. After Mahmud's forces lost a battle at Borujerd, he and his mother were assassinated by the family of the former vizir Nizam al-Mulk.

== Biography ==
In 1092, when Malik Shah I was assassinated shortly after Nizam al-Mulk, Taj al-Mulk nominated Mahmud as Sultan and set out for Isfahan. Mahmud was a child, and his mother Terken Khatun wished to seize power in his name. To accomplish this, she entered in negotiations with her son-in-law, the Caliph al-Muqtadi, to secure her rule. The Caliph opposed both a child and a woman as ruler, and could not be persuaded to allow the khutba, the sign of the sovereign, to be proclaimed in the name of a woman.

Eventually, however, the caliph al-Muqtadi agreed to let her govern if the khutba was said in the name of her son, and if she did so assisted by a vizier he appointed for her, a condition to which she saw herself forced to accept. She was thus not formally a regent, but she secured the reins of power de facto with al-Shirazi as vizier and Unar as army commander.

The older son of Malik Shah, Berkyaruq, was proclaimed too, and the armies of the two pretenders met in Borujerd, near Hamadan. The forces of Berkyaruq won and took the capital Isfahan. After this, Mahmud and his mother were assassinated by the family of the vizir Nizam al-Mulk.

Following Malik Shah I's death, successor states split from the Great Seljuk. In Anatolia, Malik Shah I was succeeded by Kilij Arslan I, who escaped from Isfahan; and in Syria by Mahmud's uncle Tutush I. Other governors in Aleppo and Amid declared independence too. The disunity within the Seljuk realms allowed for the unexpected success of the First Crusade shortly afterwards, beginning in 1096.

== Sources ==
- Bosworth, C. E. (1968). "The Political and Dynastic History of the Iranian World (A.D. 1000–1217)". In Boyle, J.A. (ed.). The Cambridge History of Iran. Vol. 5: The Saljuq and Mongol periods. Cambridge: Cambridge University Press. pp. 1–202. ISBN 978-0-521-06936-6. Archived from the original on 2022-01-23.
- Peacock, A. C. S. (2015). The Great Seljuk Empire. Edinburgh University Press. pp. 1–378. ISBN 978-0-7486-3826-0.

Preceded by Malik Shah I	Sultan of Great Seljuk; 19 November 1092–1094	Succeeded by Berkyaruq
