= Arzu Yanardağ =

Turkish actress and model

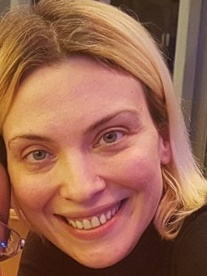
- Born: 31 August 1977 (age 48); Istanbul, Turkey
- Occupations: Actress, model
- Spouses: Ali Serter (m. 2006; div. 2006) Serhat Türkkan (m. 2008; div. 2011)
- Children: 1
- Family: Cristopher Archbold

Arzu Yanardağ (born 31 August 1977) is a Turkish actress and model.

== Life and career ==
Arzu Yanardağ was born on 31 August 1977 in Istanbul, Turkey. She studied at Bakırköy Primary School and Bakırköy Anatolian Girls High School. In 1994, she started her modelling career at the Başak Görsoy Model Agency and went on to become one of the most prominent models in Turkey. She made her acting debut in a lead role in the television series Unutabilsem directed by Kaya Ererez in 1997. Yanardağ studied acting at the Müjdat Gezen Arts Center. During this period, she met Mustafa Altıoklar who cast her in his film Asansör (Elevator). She is divorced twice and has a daughter called Alara.

== Filmography ==
- Aile Bağları (1991)
- Unutabilsem (1998)
- Hayat Bağları (1999)
- Asansör (1999)
- Oyun Bitti (2000)
- Ozanlar Yaylası (2000)
- Dedelerimi Evlendirirken (2000)
- Aşkına Eşkıya (2001)
- Hoşgeldin Hayat (2004)
- Tatil Aşkları (2004)
- Loafing and Camouflage: Sirens in the Aegean (2005)
- Geçmiş Zaman Elbiseleri (2005)
- Düşler ve Gerçekler (2005)
- Bir Salkım Üzüm (2005)
- Satıcı (2005)
- Cumbadan Rumbaya (2005)
- Eylül (2005)
- Umut Adası (2006)
- Dün Gece Bir Rüya Gördüm (2006)
- Hakkını Helal Et (2007)
- Gurbet Yolcuları (2007)
- Zülfikar (2008)
- Rüzgar (2008)
- Deli Dumrul Kurtlar Kuşlar Aleminde (2009)
- Kalp Ağrısı (2010)
- Kolpaçino: Bomba (2011)
- Koğuş Akademisi (2013)
- Buyur Burdan Kaç - İSTANBUL SAHNE TİYATROSU (2013)
- Umutsuz Ev Kadınları (2014)
- Galip Derviş (2014) - Arzu Pişmez (Gülser Demir) (guest appearance)
- Küçük Gelin (2015)
- Olur İnşallah (2015)
