= My Fair Lady (2016 TV series) =

2016–2017 South Korean television series

- Promotional Poster
- Hangul: 오 마이 금비
- RR: O mai Geumbi
- MR: O mai Kŭmbi
- Genre: Family; Melodrama
- Written by: Jun Ho-sung
- Directed by: Kim Young-jo; Ahn Joon-yong
- Starring: Heo Jung-eun; Oh Ji-ho; Park Jin-hee; Oh Yoon-ah
- Country of origin: South Korea
- Original language: Korean
- No. of episodes: 16

Production
- Executive producers: Lee Gun-jun; Lee Jang-soo; Choi Tae-young
- Producers: Lee Na-jeong; Lee Young Bum
- Running time: 60 minutes
- Production companies: My Fair Lady SPC; Logos Film

Original release
- Network: KBS2
- Release: November 16, 2016 – January 5, 2017

My Fair Lady (Korean: 오 마이 금비; lit. 'Oh My Geum-bi') is a South Korean television series starring Heo Jung-eun in the title role, with Oh Ji-ho, Park Jin-hee and Oh Yoon-ah, based on the award-winning screenplay by Jun Ho-sung. It aired every Wednesday and Thursday from November 16, 2016 to January 5, 2017 on KBS2 at 22:00 KST.

== Synopsis ==
A story about a con-man (Oh Ji-ho) and his daughter (Heo Jung-eun) who suffers from Niemann–Pick disease

== Cast ==
=== Main ===
- Heo Jung-eun as Yoo Geum-bi
- Oh Ji-ho as Mo Hwi-cheol
- Park Jin-hee as Go Kang-hee
- Oh Yoon-ah as Yoo Joo-young

=== Supporting ===
==== People around Hwi-chul ====
- Seo Hyun-chul as Kong Gil-ho
- Lee In-hye as Heo Jae-kyung
- Shin Soo-yeon as Eun-soo
- Lee Ji-hoon as Cha Chi-soo

==== People at Geum-bi's school ====
- Park Min-soo as Hwang Jae-ha
  - Son Sang-yeon as Jae-ha (17 years old)
- Kang Ji-woo as Hong Shil-ra
- Im Hye-young as Kang Min-ah
- Kim Ki-yun as Goo Mi-ran

==== People around Kang-hee ====
- Kang Sung-jin as Go Joon-pil
- Kim Do-hyun as Choi Jae-jin
- Kim Nan-hwi as Kim Hee-young

==== Others ====
- Kim Dae-jong as Kim Woo-yun
- Gil Hae-yeon as Kim Young-ji
- Jung In-seo as So-hee
- Lee Jong-soo as Ma Sang-soo
- Jason Scott Nelson as Doctor (voice)
- Jung Eui-kap as Jo Sung-gap
- Lee Ho-chul as Choi Moo-guk
- Kim Tae-han as Bae Jong-won

== Ratings ==
Average TV viewership ratings
Episode #	Date	TNmS Ratings		AGB Nielsen	
Episode #	Date	Nationwide	Seoul National Capital Area	Nationwide	Seoul National Capital Area
2016
1	November 16, 2016	5.1%	5.4%	5.9%	6.6%
2	November 17, 2016	5.6%	6.6%	6.5%	7.5%
3	November 23, 2016	4.4%	4.6%	5.7%	5.9%
4	November 24, 2016	4.5%	5.2%	5.2%	5.9%
5	November 30, 2016	4.8%	5.1%	5.2%	5.5%
6	December 1, 2016	5.0%	5.9%	5.5%	6.4%
7	December 7, 2016	5.6%	6.5%	5.8%	6.7%
8	December 8, 2016	5.0%	5.8%	6.0%	6.5%
9	December 14, 2016	5.0%	5.5%	5.7%	6.4%
10	December 15, 2016	5.6%	5.9%	6.3%	6.6%
11	December 21, 2016	5.6%	6.3%	6.4%	6.6%
12	December 22, 2016	5.1%	5.3%	7.0%	6.8%
13	December 28, 2016	5.7%	5.9%	6.8%	7.0%
2017
14	January 4, 2017	5.6%	5.8%	6.1%	6.3%
15	January 5, 2017	6.1%	6.7%	7.2%	7.8%
16	January 11, 2017	5.2%	5.9%	5.6%	6.3%
In the table, the blue numbers represent the lowest ratings and the red numbers represent the highest ratings.; Note: Episode 14 didn't air as scheduled (Thursday, December 29) due to KBS Song Festival.

== Awards and nominations ==
Year presented, name of the award ceremony, category, recipient of the award and the result of the nomination
Year	Award	Category	Recipient	Result
2016	30th KBS Drama Awards	Excellence Award, Actor in a Miniseries	Oh Ji-ho	Nominated
2016	30th KBS Drama Awards	Excellence Award, Actress in a Miniseries	Park Jin-hee	Nominated
2016	30th KBS Drama Awards	Best Supporting Actress	Oh Yoon-ah	Nominated
2016	30th KBS Drama Awards	Best Young Actress	Heo Jung-eun	Won
2016	30th KBS Drama Awards	Best Couple Award	Oh Ji-ho and Heo Jung-eun	Won

== Adaptation ==
A Turkish adaptation titled Kızım ("My Daughter") was produced by Med Yapım and aired by TV8 for 34 episodes from September 19, 2018 to May 31, 2019. It starred Beren Gökyıldız as eight-year-old girl Öykü Tekin Göktürk and Buğra Gülsoy as her father Demir Göktürk.
