= Mother (South Korean TV series) =

South Korean television series

- Promotional poster
- Also known as: Call Me Mother
- Hangul: 마더
- RR: Madeo
- MR: Madŏ
- Genre: Drama; Suspense
- Based on: Mother by Yuji Sakamoto
- Developed by: Studio Dragon
- Written by: Jeong Seo-kyeong
- Directed by: Kim Cheol-kyu
- Starring: Lee Bo-young; Heo Yool; Lee Hye-young; Nam Ki-ae; Ko Sung-hee
- Music by: Jeong Se-rin (Movie Closer)
- Country of origin: South Korea
- Original language: Korean
- No. of episodes: 16

Production
- Executive producers: Kim Jin-yi; Park Ji-young
- Camera setup: Single-camera
- Running time: 60 minutes
- Production company: The Unicorn

Original release
- Network: tvN
- Release: January 24 – March 15, 2018

Related
- Mother (Japan); Anne (Turkey); Imperfect Love (China); Saving Grace (Philippines)

Mother (Korean: 마더) is a 2018 South Korean television series starring Lee Bo-young, Heo Yool, Lee Hye-young, Nam Ki-ae, and Ko Sung-hee. It is a remake of the 2010 Japanese TV series of the same title. It aired on tvN from January 24 to March 15, 2018, every Wednesday and Thursday at 21:30 (KST).

== Synopsis ==
A temporary teacher (Kang Soo-jin) at an elementary school realizes that one of her students (Kim Hye-na) is being abused at home by her mother (Shin Ja-young) and live-in boyfriend (Lee Seol-ak). Though reported to the police, they do nothing about it. After discovering the child one night placed in a black plastic bin liner on the edge of the road outside the family home, the teacher makes the impulsive decision to take the child. The pair bond immediately: the girl soon regards the teacher as her own mother and chooses a new name for herself, Kim Yoon-bok. Kang Soo-jin hopes to be able to flee the country with Yoon-bok, but with the child not possessing a passport, the pair are caught in a limbo.

On the run and with nowhere to go, they are first befriended by Madame Ra, who runs a homeless shelter but who has connections with shady people who can forge the necessary passport. However, when the police raid the shelter, Soo-jin and Yoon-bok flee with Madame Ra, only to be tricked by her, losing the large sum of money given to obtain the passport. Soo-jin then takes Yoon-bok back to the orphanage where she herself grew up after being dumped there by her biological mother. The building is now abandoned, but still living there alone is the woman, Clara (now very old), who had run the orphanage. They spend a few memorable days with Clara, but when the authorities arrive to take Clara away to a home, they again have to leave.

With options running out, Soo-jin returns alone to the home of the wealthy actress who adopted her from the orphans' home over 25 years earlier to ask for money. Though estranged from her adopted family, the actress is delighted to have her daughter "back home". Soo-jin leaves Yoon-bok first in a hotel and then is able to rent a small apartment in the same neighbourhood from a woman who has her own barber's shop. The actress and her two other daughters are soon delightfully surprised to discover that Kang Soo-jin, the "black sheep of the family", has a child of her own - Soo-jin not revealing the fact that she has "abducted" the child.

The mother-and-child's problems continue, however. It turns out that the kind lady barber - who Yoon-bok starts to refer to as "Granny" - is in fact Soo-jin's biological mother, who unbeknown to anyone had deliberately moved there in order to follow her daughter's life under adoption. Kang Soo-jin is horrified to discover that the woman is her biological mother, and removes herself and the child from the premises.

The police had initially suspected that the child had accidentally fallen into the sea, but then later acquire evidence that she is still alive. While keeping up the pretense of being mother and daughter, Kang Soo-jin still hopes to be able to flee the country with Kim Yoon-bok but now they are being pursued by the police tracking down the "kidnapper", as well as the child's mother's boyfriend determined to silence the child from reporting child abuse.

Yoon-bok's mother discovers her daughter living in the house of the wealthy actress's family and her boyfriend manages to "take back" the child, but for the purpose of demanding a ransom from the wealthy family. He holds the child captive in the abandoned orphanage. Kang Soo-jin manages to free her before the police arrive, whereupon the boyfriend commits suicide by setting the building on fire. Kang Soo-jin and Yoon-bok are eventually caught by the police just before getting on a boat that would have taken them to China.

Shin Ja-young, Yoon-bok's mother, is put on trial for child abuse and is found guilty based on the child's statements. Kang Soo-jin is also then put on trial for kidnapping the child, but the sympathetic court punishes her with 3 years probation but with no prison time, albeit with the condition that she should have no further contact with Yoon-bok.

Yoon-bok is placed in an orphanage where she is outwardly happy, but those looking after her recognize that she is depressed. She then manages to abscond back to Kang Soo-jin's family home, before having to return a few days later. An attempt to have her adopted by a sympathetic young couple fails. Yoon-bok tells the orphanage director that she would rather stay in the orphanage in the hope that her "mother", Kang Soo-jin, will eventually come to fetch her. Initially aghast at the idea of Yoon-bok being reunited with her "kidnapper", the orphanage director eventually realises that the bond between them was based on love not menace, and Yoon-bok eventually gets to go and live with Kang Soo-jin, who soon afterwards officially adopts her.

== Cast ==
=== Main ===
- Lee Bo-young as Kang Soo-jin, Yoon-bok's teacher and soon adoptive mother.
- Heo Yool as Kim Hye-na/Kim Yoon-bok, one of Soo-jin's students and soon adopted 9-year-old daughter.
- Lee Hye-young as Cha Young-sin, Soo-jin, Yi-jin and Hyun-jin's adoptive mother.
  - Choi Yoon-so as young Young-sin.
- Nam Gi-ae as Nam Hong-hee, Soo-jin's birth mother.
  - Lim Se-Joo as young Nam Hong-hee.
- Ko Sung-hee as Shin Ja-young, Yoon-bok's birth mother.

=== Supporting ===
==== People around Soo-jin ====
- Ye Soo-jung as Clara, owner of the orphanage.
- Lee Jae-yoon as Jung Jin-hong, a doctor.
- Kim Young-jae as Eun-cheol, an ornithologist.

==== People around Ja-young ====
- Son Suk-ku as Lee Seol-ak, Ja-young's boyfriend.
- Jo Han-chul as Chang-geun, a police detective.

==== People around Young-sin ====
- Jeon Hye-jin as Kang Yi-jin, Soo-jin's younger sister.
- Go Bo-gyeol as Kang Hyun-jin, Soo-jin's youngest sister.
- Lee Jung-yeol as Jae-beom, Cha Young-sin's assistant
- Lee Joo-won as Tae-hoon, Yi-jin's son and Tae-mi's twin brother.
- Choi Yoo-ri as Tae-mi, Yi-jin's daughter and Tae-hoon's twin sister.

==== Others ====
- Jeon Mi-do as Ra-ra, Lee Seol-ak's former girlfriend
- Song Yoo-hyun as Song Ye-eun, a teacher
- Seo Yi-sook as Madame Ra, a shelter owner
- Ha Kyung as Park Kyung-Seok, a junior detective
- Jung Min-Sung as the lawyer of Cha Young-sin and her family

== Production ==
- Child actress Heo Yool was selected out of 400 candidates for the role of Kim Hye-na.
- The first four-hour script reading of the cast was held on November 1, 2017, at Studio Dragon's main office in Sangam-dong.

== Original soundtrack ==
=== Part 1 ===
No.	Title	Lyrics	Music	Artist	Length
1.	"To You" (나인 너에게)	Tei	1601	Kim Yoon-ah	04:14
2.	"To You (Inst.)" (나인 너에게 (Inst.))		1601		04:14
Total length:					08:28

=== Part 2 ===
No.	Title	Lyrics	Music	Artist	Length
1.	"Next To You"	Peter Han	Park Woo-sank	Peter Han	03:15
2.	"Next To You (Inst.)"		Park Woo-sang		03:15
Total length:					06:30

=== Part 3 ===
No.	Title	Lyrics	Music	Artist	Length
1.	"Let's Go Together" (같이 가자)	Park Asher	Park Asher	Ha Dong-kyun	04:25
2.	"Let's Go Together (Inst.)" (같이 가자 (Inst.))		Park Asher		04:25
Total length:					08:50

=== Part 4 ===
No.	Title	Lyrics	Music	Artist	Length
1.	"Journey" (여정)	Sunwoo Jung-a	Sunwoo Jung-a	Sunwoo Jung-a	04:30
2.	"Journey (Inst.)" (여정 (Inst.))		Sunwoo Jung-a		04:30
Total length:					09:00

=== Part 5 ===
No.	Title	Lyrics	Music	Artist	Length
1.	"Kind of Love" (어떤 사랑)	Ha Melli	Lee Sang-hoon	Seungkwan (Seventeen)	03:55
2.	"Kind of Love (Inst.)" (어떤 사랑 (Inst.))		Lee Sang-hoon		03:55
Total length:					07:50

== Viewership ==
Mother : South Korea viewers per episode (thousands)

Season	Episode number																Average
Season	1	2	3	4	5	6	7	8	9	10	11	12	13	14	15	16	Average
1	674	811	547	728	569	909	556	503	553	1039	734	994	705	1032	874	1064	768

Source: Audience measurement performed nationwide by Nielsen Korea.

Average TV viewership ratings
Ep.	Original broadcast date	Average audience share		
Ep.	Original broadcast date	Nielsen Korea		TNmS
Ep.	Original broadcast date	Nationwide	Seoul	Nationwide
1	January 24, 2018	2.952%	3.211%	3.8%
2	January 25, 2018	3.494%	3.629%	4.1%
3	January 31, 2018	2.542%	2.029%	3.0%
4	February 1, 2018	3.267%	3.448%	3.5%
5	February 7, 2018	2.451%	2.800%	3.2%
6	February 8, 2018	4.206%	4.786%	3.9%
7	February 14, 2018	2.694%	2.747%	3.4%
8	February 15, 2018	2.394%	3.010%	1.9%
9	February 21, 2018	2.668%	3.056%	3.1%
10	February 22, 2018	4.495%	4.894%	4.9%
11	February 28, 2018	3.138%	3.476%	4.3%
12	March 1, 2018	3.927%	4.391%	3.9%
13	March 7, 2018	3.487%	3.503%	3.7%
14	March 8, 2018	4.584%	4.810%	4.6%
15	March 14, 2018	4.100%	4.332%	4.5%
16	March 15, 2018	4.974%	5.205%	5.6%
Average		3.460%	3.707%	3.8%
In the table above, the blue numbers represent the lowest ratings and the red numbers represent the highest ratings.; This series aired on a cable channel/pay TV which normally has a relatively smaller audience compared to free-to-air TV/public broadcasters (KBS, SBS, MBC and EBS).

== Awards and nominations ==
Award	Category	Recipients	Result	Ref
1st Cannes International Series Festival	Best Series	Mother	Nominated	
54th Baeksang Arts Awards	Best Drama	Mother	Won	
54th Baeksang Arts Awards	Best Director	Kim Cheol-kyu	Nominated	
54th Baeksang Arts Awards	Best Actress	Lee Bo-young	Nominated	
54th Baeksang Arts Awards	Best Screenplay	Jang Seo-kyung	Nominated	
54th Baeksang Arts Awards	Best New Actress	Heo Yool	Won	
13th Seoul International Drama Awards	Best Mini-series	Mother	Won	
13th Seoul International Drama Awards	Best Actress	Lee Bo-young	Won	
6th APAN Star Awards	Top Excellence Award, Actress in a Miniseries	Lee Bo-young	Nominated	
6th APAN Star Awards	Best Supporting Actress	Ko Sung-hee	Nominated	
2nd The Seoul Awards	Best Supporting Actress	Ko Sung-hee	Nominated	
