= Aşk Evlilik Boşanma =

- Genre: Family; Drama
- Written by: Rahşan Çiğdem İnan
- Story by: Bennu Yıldırımlar; Müjde Uzman; Serhat Teoman; Levent Can
- Directed by: Aytaç Çiçek
- Starring: Bennu Yıldırımlar; Müjde Uzman; Melisa Şenolsun
- Composers: Ercan Saatçi; İlker Yeter
- Country of origin: Turkey
- Original language: Turkish
- No. of seasons: 1
- No. of episodes: 4

Production
- Producer: Saner Ayar
- Production location: Istanbul
- Running time: 120 minutes
- Production company: Karga Seven Pictures

Original release
- Network: Now TV
- Release: 19 November 2024

Aşk Evlilik Boşanma, internationally known as Love, Marriage, Divorce, is a Turkish drama and romance television series that premiered on November 19, 2024, on NOW. The series is produced by Karga Seven Pictures and created by Rahşan Çiğdem İnan. It is available for streaming in Turkish.

== Plot ==
The story follows three women who, despite having nothing in common other than working in the same job, form a bond to support each other after their roles in their marriages are taken away from them. The narrative explores the struggles and resilience of these women as they navigate their personal and professional lives.

== Cast ==
- Bennu Yıldırımlar as Güner Önerli
- Müjde Uzman as Gaye Tabipoğlu
- Melisa Şenolsun as Naz Çiyitözü
- Serhat Teoman as Çınar Tabipoğlu
- Levent Can as Altan Önerli
- Furkan Okumuş as Timuçin Çiyitözü

== Episodes ==
=== List of episodes ===
No.	Title	Directed by	Written by	Original release date
1	TBA	Deniz Yorulmazer	Ayşe Üner Kutlu	November 19, 2024
Three women working in a media group that broadcasts for women: Naz, in her 30s, who wreaks havoc on those around her with her energy; Gaye, a cold-blooded director in her 40s who has built her life on perfection; and Güner, a talented copywriter in her 50s who makes every sacrifice for her family. Although these women are successful in their careers, they are not yet aware that storms are brewing in their personal lives..
2	TBA	Deniz Yorulmazer	Ayşe Üner Kutlu	November 26, 2024
3	TBA	Deniz Yorulmazer	Ayşe Üner Kutlu	December 3, 2024
4	TBA	Deniz Yorulmazer	Ayşe Üner Kutlu	December 10, 2024

== See also ==
- Television in Turkey
- List of Turkish television series
- Turkish television drama
