= Episode 1 (Uyanış: Büyük Selçuklu) =

- Uyanış: Büyük Selçuklu episode
- The opening Seljuk–Khwarazm battle sequence. Aside from the main cast, 400 actors took part in the sequence. Filming of the sequence was completed over eight days.
- Episode no.: Season 1 Episode 1
- Directed by: Sedat İnci & Emre Konuk
- Written by: Emre Konuk & Serdar Özönalan
- Original air date: September 28, 2020
- Running time: 2 hours, 43 minutes

Guest appearance
- Serdar Kılıç as Alp Arslan

Episode chronology
← Previous —	Next → "Episode 2"

"Episode 1" is the first episode of the first season of the Turkish historical action series Uyanış: Büyük Selçuklu, written by Serdar Özönalan, directed by Sedat İnci and produced by Emre Konuk. The episode premiered on 28 September 2020 and it reached the top of the ratings in Turkey. It became popular due to a particular war scene, which was both well received and criticised for its historical inaccuracy.

== Plot ==
Melikşah's father Alp Arslan is killed after conquering Berzem Castle in a major battle against the Khwarazm, with Melikşah taking the throne. Melikşah's wife, Başulu Hatun, is claimed to have died of childbirth, with her son Ahmed surviving (both actually alive and hidden by Nizamülmülk). Nizamülmülk convinces Melikşah to give up his son as he would not be accepted into the Seljuk dynasty as the son of Başulu, who had been falsely accused of spying for the Kipchaks and had been exiled.

After eighteen years, Melikşah is targeted with assassination by the Batinis but is saved by his son, renamed Sencer, although Melikşah does not recognise him. It is later claimed that the Anatolian Turkmens carried out the attack. Nizamülmülk does not believe this but Melikşah orders that the Turkmen Elçin Hatun, sister of the imprisoned Turkmen leader Kiliçarslan, be brought to the palace in Isfahan.

After seeing a nightmare involving Ahmed burning, Melikşah summons Nizamülmülk to Başulu's supposed grave, demanding to see his son Ahmed, as Sencer and his brother Tapar arrest Elçin but are ambushed by the Batinis.

== Production ==
Although we made our preparations long before we started shooting, I can say that the horsemen coming behind us was a little stressful. Fortunately, we finished without any mishaps.

— Buğra Gülsoy, who portrays Melikşah, on filming the opening battle scene

The episode featured what was, at the time, the longest battle scene in Turkish television history. A total of 400 actors, excluding the main ones, 100 of them on horseback, took part in the battle scene. Preparation took 60 days and the shooting took 8 days. The actors received horse riding and sword training by the action director of the Kazakh Nomad Stunts team, who choreographed Hollywood movies for a month.

The actors, who worked on fitness, continuity and coordination, went through a challenging training program in this process. For the battle scene in the first episode, 45 stuntmen and 120 supporting actors were given tough action and choreography training by Nomad Stunts for 15 days at the shooting location. During the shootings, ambulances, medical teams and veterinarians were present in case of any negative situation. The horse trainers provided by the Nomad Stunt team travelled around various cities of Anatolia, and only 15 horses among 150 horses, which were available for training, were included in the project. Horses were trained for a period of one month. Archery training was provided to the cast by a different company.

"Episode 1" is directed by Serdar Özönalan and Emre Konuk, the latter also being the writer with Sedat İnci. Hasan Erimez, Özlem Atasoy and Faruk Emre Özünlu are credited as staff writers.

== Reception ==
The first promotional trailer became a hit and the episode was rated 9.3 out of 10 on IMDb. The first episode, which aired on 28 September 2020, reached the top of the rating in Turkey and it was the only Turkish TV series to be included in the daily hits section of newspaper The Wit. Although the blood-shedding war scene was enjoyed by many fans, Turkish critics declared it historically inaccurate as the Seljuks were a peaceful nation.
