= Leyla Lydia Tuğutlu =

Turkish actress and model

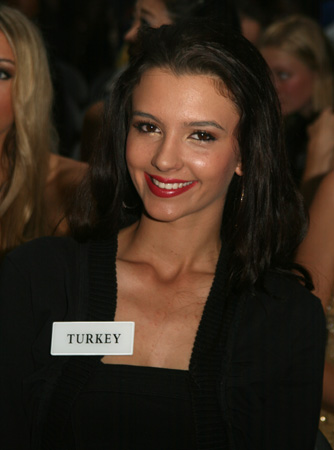
- Tuğutlu in 2008
- Born: 29 October 1989 (age 36); Berlin, Germany
- Occupations: Actress, model, singer
- Spouse: Ceyhun Ergin (m. 2022)
- Children: 1
- Beauty pageant titleholder
- Title: Miss Turkey 2008
- Years active: 2008–present
- Major competitions: Miss Turkey 2008 (Winner); Miss World 2008 (Unplaced)

Leyla Lydia Tuğutlu (born 29 October 1989) is a Turkish-German actress, singer, model and beauty pageant titleholder. She was crowned Miss Turkey 2008, and represented Turkey at the Miss World 2008 pageant.

== Early life ==
Leyla Lydia Tuğutlu was born in Berlin in 1989, the daughter of a Turkish father and a German mother. After primary school and Anatolia High School, she attended a Turkish conservatory, where she learned to play the piano and the violin, and Istanbul University, where she studied German language and literature. (She speaks English as well as German and Turkish.) She began working as a model while still a student.

She began her acting career with a leading role in a Turkish television series for young viewers, Es-Es. She went on to star in Kızım, the romantic comedy series Tatlı İntikam and the popular Uyanış: Büyük Selçuklu, in which her co-stars included Buğra Gülsoy and Ekin Koç. She also appeared in several successful films.

== Beauty contests ==
In 2005, Tuğutlu won the "Best promising" award in a competition for Turkish models. In 2006, she was garlanded as "International princess" in the Miss Tourism Queen International competition in China. In 2007, she was judged "Most promising model" in the TV Fashion Oscars. She was crowned Miss Turkey in 2008, and so went on to represent her country in the Miss World competition held in Johannesburg, South Africa in December 2008.

== Filmography ==
Television
| Year | Series | Role | Note(s) |
|---|---|---|---|
| 2008–2009 | ES-ES | İrem | Leading role |
| 2010–2011 | Kirli Beyaz | Melis | Supporting role |
| 2012–2015 | Karadayı | Songül Kara | Supporting role |
| 2015–2016 | Kiralık Aşk | İz | Supporting role |
| 2016 | Tatlı İntikam | Pelin Soylun | Leading role |
| 2017 | Bu Şehir Arkandan Gelecek | Derin Mirkelamoğlu | Leading role |
| 2018–2019 | Kızım | Candan Hoşgör Göktürk | Leading role |
| 2020–2021 | Uyanış: Büyük Selçuklu | Elçin Hatun | Leading role |
Cinema
| Year | Film | Role | Note |
| 2013 | Günce | Aslı | Supporting role |
| 2014 | İçimdeki Ses | Ayşıl | Leading role |
| 2015 | Delibal | Fusun | Leading role |
| 2018 | Dışarda 2 | Meryem | Supporting role |
| 2018 | Cebimdeki Yabancı | Tuba | Leading Role |

Awards and achievements
| Preceded by Selen Soyder | Miss Turkey; 2008 | Succeeded by Ebru Şam |
