= Hatice Şendil =

Turkish actress

- Born: 2 August 1983 (age 42); Istanbul, Turkey
- Occupation: Actress
- Years active: 2001–present
- Spouse: Burak Sağyaşar (m. 2015)
- Children: 1

Hatice Şendil Şağyaşar (born 2 August 1983) is a Turkish actress and model. She has starred in many Turkish movies and series including Karadağlar, Dila Hanım, Kaderimin Yazıldığı Gün and Uyanış: Büyük Selçuklu.

== Life and career ==
Hatice Şendil was born on 2 August 1983 in Istanbul and was raised in Antalya. Her mother is from Istanbul and her father is from Antalya. After Ottoman Empire collapsed, her paternal family is of Turkish descent who immigrated from Thessaloniki and Morea. She has two sisters. She majored in business.

In 2001, she competed in Miss Turkey and was placed third. As a result, she represented her country in Miss Europe beauty pageant and earned the fourth place. In 2001, she had a role in the music video for Çelik Erişçi's song "Töre". Meanwhile, she took acting and horse racing lessons.

In the following years she appeared in supporting roles in various TV series. In 2008, she was cast in hit crime series Kurtlar Vadisi Pusu as Ebru Alemdar. In 2010, she got a role in the series Karadağlar alongside Erdal Özyağcılar, İbrahim Çelikkol, Korel Cezayirli, Burak Sağyaşar, Ahmet Rıfat Şungar and Güzin Özyağcılar. She portrayed the character of Gülhayat in this series. She had guest role in hit comedy series "Geniş Aile".

The main breakthrough in her acting career came in 2012, with the leading role in the TV series Dila Hanım remake of 1977 film alongside Erkan Petekkaya, Mahir Günşiray, Necip Memili and Yonca Cevher. In 2014, she was cast opposite Özcan Deniz in the series Kaderimin Yazıldığı Gün, which received high ratings in Turkey. She also began acting in the historical drama series Uyanış Büyük Selçuklu, with the role of Terken Hatun in 2020.

She is married to actor, producer and series Karadağlar's co-star Burak Sağyaşar in 2015. Their son, Can, was born in 2017.

== Filmography ==
=== Films ===
- Hayat Öpücüğü - 2015 - Hayat

=== TV series ===
- İyilik - 2022–2023 - Neslihan Arkun
- Uyanış: Büyük Selçuklu - 2020–2021 - Terken Hatun
- Yüksek Sosyete - 2016 - Herself (guest appearance)
- Kaderimin Yazıldığı Gün - 2014 - Elif Yörükhan
- Dila Hanım - 2012 - Dila Hanım
- Karadağlar - 2010 - Gülhayat
- Geniş Aile - 2010 - Şelale (guest appearance)
- Kurtlar Vadisi Pusu - 2008–2010 - Ebru Alemdar
- Yaban Gülü - 2008 - Laçin
- Fesupanallah - 2007 - Gülpare
- İki Yabancı - 2007- Zeyno
- Eylül - 2005 - Aziza
- Yeni Hayat - 2001 - Buket
