= Mother (Japanese TV series) =

- Poster
- Genre: Drama
- Written by: Yuji Sakamoto
- Directed by: Nobuo Mizuta (NTV); Makoto Naganuma
- Starring: Yasuko Matsuyuki
- Theme music composer: Kodai Iwatsubo
- Ending theme: "Nakigao Smile" by hinaco
- Composer: REMEDIOS
- Country of origin: Japan
- Original language: Japanese
- No. of seasons: 1
- No. of episodes: 11

Production
- Executive producer: Yoshiki Tanaka (NTV)
- Producers: Hisashi Tsugiya (NTV); Yukitoshi Chiba
- Running time: 54 minutes
- Production company: Nippon Television

Original release
- Network: NNS (NTV)
- Release: April 14 – June 23, 2010

Related
- Anne (Turkey); Mother (South Korea); Mother's Choice (Ukraine); Mother rîak chăn wâa... mâe (Thailand); Imperfect Love (China); Sauver Lisa (France); Heridas (Spain); Saving Grace (Philippines)

Mother is a Japanese television drama starring Yasuko Matsuyuki which aired on Nippon Television from April 14 to June 23, 2010.

== Plot ==
Nao Suzuhara is a temporary elementary school teacher. When she realizes that one of her students is being physically abused by her mother, Nao's maternal instincts kick in, and she impulsively decides to bring the girl into her own care. Serving as a substitute mother, Nao takes the child on a trip from Muroran to Tokyo, and the two experience various events together along the way.

== Cast ==
- Yasuko Matsuyuki as Nao Suzuhara
- Mana Ashida as Rena Michiki / Tsugumi Suzuhara
- Koji Yamamoto as Shunsuke Fujiyoshi
- Wakana Sakai as Mei Suzuhara
- Kana Kurashina as Kaho Suzuhara
- Machiko Ono as Hitomi Michiki
- Yosuke Kawamura as Kohei Kimata
- Miwako Ichikawa as Tamami Yuzukawa
- Takuma Otoo as Keigo Kayama
- Minoru Tanaka as Kensuke Fujiyoshi
- Gō Ayano as Masato Uragami
- Atsuko Takahata as Toko Suzuhara
- Yūko Tanaka as Hana Mochizuki

== Episodes ==
	Episode title	Romanized title	Translation of title	Broadcast date	Ratings
1	児童虐待からの脱出 渡り鳥になった二人	Jidō gyakutai kara no dasshutsu wataridori ni natta ni-nin	Escape from child abuse; the two who became birds of passage	April 14, 2010	11.8%
2	居場所のない二人	Ibasho no nai ni-nin	The two without a place to go	April 21, 2010	12.0%
3	母の手のぬくもり	Haha no te no nukumori	The warmth of a mother's hand	April 28, 2010	12.8%
4	学校へ行かせたい	Gakkō e ika setai	I want to let her attend school	May 5, 2010	10.0%
5	二人の"母親"	Ni-nin no"hahaoya"	Two "Mothers"	May 12, 2010	11.9%
6	さよならお母さん	Sayonara okāsan	Goodbye, Mother	May 19, 2010	13.9%
7	あの子を返して!	Ano ko o kaeshite!	Return her to me!	May 26, 2010	12.4%
8	断ち切れない絆	Tachikirenai kizuna	The bond that can't be broken	June 2, 2010	14.0%
9	引き裂かれる二人	Hikisaka reru ni-nin	The two torn apart	June 9, 2010	12.2%
10	ひと目会いたい	Hitome aitai	I want to see you just once	June 16, 2010	14.8%
11	ずっと愛してる	Zutto aishi teru	I will always love you	June 23, 2010	16.3%
Ratings for Kanto region (average rating: 12.9%)

== International broadcasts ==
Mother was broadcast on the Mei Ah Drama Channel in Taiwan and Singapore on August 5, 2011, and in Hong Kong on August 8, 2011.

The series aired on Red Uno in Bolivia and Teleamazonas in Ecuador in 2020, marking the arrival of Nippon TV's productions in Latin America. This came after the broadcast of the Turkish adaptation in the region.

== International remakes ==
Country	Local title	Network	Original release
China	Imperfect Love	Tencent Video iQIYI	March 27 – April 11, 2020
France	Sauver Lisa	M6	November 16–30, 2021
Greece	Να με λες Μαμά; Na me les Mama	Alpha TV	September 25 – October 23, 2025
Mongolia	Ээж; Mother	VOO IPTV; Edutainment TV	January 11 – March 6, 2024
Philippines	Saving Grace	Amazon Prime Video	November 28, 2024 – January 9, 2025
South Korea	Mother	tvN	January 24 – March 15, 2018
Spain	Heridas	Atresplayer Premium; Antena 3	April 17 – July 10, 2022
Thailand	Mother เรียกฉันว่า...แม่ Mother rîak chăn wâa... mâe	Line TV; PPTV	March 5, 2020 – May 7, 2020
Turkey	Anne	Star TV	October 25, 2016 – June 20, 2017
Saudi Arabia	أمي	MBC 1 Shahid	May 4, 2025 – August 2025
Ukraine	Вибір матері The Choice of Mother	STB	September 23, 2019 – August 6, 2020

Preceded by Magerarenai Onna (January 13, 2010 – March 17, 2010)	NTV Wednesday Dramas 水曜ドラマ; Wednesdays 22:00 – 22:54 (JST)	Succeeded by Hotaru no Hikari 2 (April 24, 2011 – June 2011)
