= Kızım =

2018 Turkish television series

- Genre: Drama; Comedy
- Based on: My Fair Lady by Jun Ho-seong
- Written by: Banu Kiremitçi; Irmak Bahçeci; Emre Erkan
- Directed by: Gökçen Usta (1-18); Fatih Aksoy, Merve Girgin (19); Mustafa Şevki Doğan (20-28); Gökçen Usta (29-34)
- Starring: Buğra Gülsoy; Beren Gökyıldız; Leyla Lydia Tuğutlu; Serhat Teoman; Selin Şekerci
- Composers: Özgür Özaslan; Murat Cem Orhan; Cem Ergunoğlu; Mehmet Ünal
- Country of origin: Turkey
- Original language: Turkish
- No. of seasons: 1
- No. of episodes: 34

Production
- Producer: Fatih Aksoy
- Running time: 120 minutes
- Production company: Med Yapım

Original release
- Network: TV8
- Release: 19 September 2018 – 31 May 2019

Kızım (English translation: My Daughter, English title: My Little Girl) is a Turkish television series that aired from 9 September 2018 to 31 May 2019 on Fridays, with the exception of the first episode, at 8 pm, and is based on the 2016 Korean drama My Fair Lady

== Plot ==
Öykü Tekin Göktürk is an eight-year-old girl that lives with her mother's (Asu Karahan) friend, Zeynep Kaya, who upon discovering that the girl has the only case of a rare genetic disease called Niemann-Pick in Turkey, decides to abandon her. She leaves Öykü a note with the address of her father, Demir Göktürk, who is an irresponsible law-offender who had just been arrested on the morning of the day that Zeynep abandoned Öykü. In court, the judge lets Demir go on the condition that he takes custody of Öykü as her father, which had been proved by a false paternity test conducted by Demir's best friend (brother), Uğur Adıgüzel, although that false test was unnecessary because Demir was Öykü's biological father. At first, Demir accepts the deal, but he does not want to care for Öykü. However, when Demir finds out that Öykü has Niemann-Pick, he decides to try change to help her through the situation.

== Cast ==
- Buğra Gülsoy as Demir Göktürk
- Beren Gökyıldız as Öykü Tekin Göktürk
- Leyla Lydia Tuğutlu as Candan Hoşgör Göktürk
- Serhat Teoman as Cemal Eröz
- Selin Şekerci as Asu Karahan
- Sinem Ünsal as Sevgi Günay Adıgüzel
- Suna Selen as Müfide Adıgüzel
- Tugay Mercan as Uğur Adıgüzel
- Elif Verit as Zeynep Kaya
- Gökhan Soylu as Dr. İhsan Erbil
- Elit Andaç Çam as Ayla
- Eliz Neşe Çağın as İlayda
- Ece Akdeniz as Betul
- Deniz Ali Cankorur as Mertcan
- Günes Çaglar as Cenk Hoşgör
- Faruk Barman as Murat
- İhsan İlhan as Jilet
- Mehdi Adlin as Ahmet
