= Imperfect Love =

2020 Chinese drama television series

- Promotional poster
- Chinese: 不完美的她
- Hanyu Pinyin: Bù wánměi de tā
- Genre: Suspense, Drama, Family
- Written by: Lu Yi
- Directed by: Liu Biao
- Starring: Zhou Xun; Kara Hui; Angie Chiu; Huang Jue
- Country of origin: China
- Original language: Mandarin
- No. of seasons: 1
- No. of episodes: 22

Production
- Executive producers: Lu Yi; Han Zhijie
- Production companies: Tencent Pictures; Dong Shen Pictures; Radiant Pictures, Inc.

Original release
- Network: Tencent Video; IQIYI
- Release: March 27 – April 11, 2020

Related
- Mother (Japan); Anne (Turkey); Mother (South Korean)

Imperfect Love (Chinese: 不完美的她) is a 2020 Chinese drama television series directed by Liu Bao and starring Zhou Xun, Kara Hui, Angie Chiu, and Huang Jue. The series is a remake of the award-winning 2010 Japanese TV series Mother. It aired on Tencent Video and IQIYI from March 27 to April 4, 2020.

== Plot ==
The drama is shot from the perspective of women and tells a story about finding light in the darkness and embracing hope in motherhood.

Lin Xuzhi (Zhou Xun), a woman without a past, was adopted and is still afraid from being abandoned by her birth mother. Xuzhi meets and befriends seven-year-old Mu Liansheng (Chen Sinuo), who she quickly realizes is being abused at home by her mother and mother's boyfriend. One night, Xuzhi finds Liansheng tied up alone in a closet after a fire breaks out in the latter's house. Xuzhi takes the girl into her own care, and they flee from Dalian to Beijing. While caring for the young girl, two broken souls find solace in each other.

== Cast ==
- Zhou Xun as Lin Xuzhi
- Chen Sinuo as Mu Liansheng / Lin Xiao-ou
- Huang Jue as Tian Fang
- Kara Hui as Yuan Ling
- Angie Chiu as Zhong Hui
- Chin Shih-chieh as Li Ze
- Tong Yao as Gao Shan
- Qu Gaowei as Guo Yue
- Cai Yatong as Mu Jing
- Chiang Yunlin as Shang Wu
- Zeng Yixuan as Lin Zhiyan
- Chen Yizan as Xiao O-zhi
- Liu Baisha as Lin Guozhi
- Kang Fuzhen as Jiang Guodong
- Yang Bo as Hao Ping
- Sheng Gang Shuai
- Guo Tiecheng as Guo Jianmin
- He Yuhe as an office clerk
- Sun Lei as
- Zhao Yali as Su Kui
- Ma Weifu as Lao Zhou
- Hai Yitian as a lawyer
- Lin Zilin
- Chi Peng as Aunt Song

== Awards and nominations ==
Award	Category	Nominated work	Result	Ref.
26th Shanghai Television Festival (Shanghai Internet Summit)	Best Web drama of the Year	Imperfect Love	Won	
26th Shanghai Television Festival (Shanghai Internet Summit)	Best Actress (Web drama)	Zhou Xun	Won	
