= Sezin Akbaşoğulları =

Turkish actress (born 1981)

- Born: 22 April 1981 (age 45); İzmir, Turkey
- Education: Bilkent University
- Occupation: Actress
- Years active: 2000–present
- Awards: International Adana Film Festival – Best Actress (2010)

Sezin Akbaşoğulları (born 22 April 1981) is a Turkish actress.

== Career ==
She gained her first acting experience by joining her high school theatre team and was cast in the play Yine Başladılar Şarkılarına. She later graduated from Bilkent University with a degree in theatre studies. Her breakthrough came with her role in the 2005 series Beyaz Gelincik as Ceren Aslanbaş. She had leading role in medical series Sen de Gitme. She earned critical acclaim with her performance in the movie Kavşak, for she was awarded as the Best Actress together with Nergis Öztürk at the 17th International Adana Film Festival in 2010. With Erdal Beşikçioğlu, she played in the film Fakat Müzeyyen Bu Derin Bir Tutku, based on a novel, and in the hit crime series Behzat Ç.

== Filmography ==
=== Film ===
Film
| Year | Title | Role | Notes |
| 2004 | Gülizar | | Supporting role |
| 2004 | Bir Aşk Hikayesi | Dünya | Leading role |
| 2008 | O... Çocukları | Meryem | Leading role |
| 2010 | Kardelen | Ülker | Leading role |
| 2010 | Kavşak | Arzu | Leading role |
| 2011 | Yabancı | Özgür | Leading role |
| 2014 | Fakat Müzeyyen Bu Derin Bir Tutku | Müzeyyen | Leading role |
| 2018 | Sevgili Komşum | Nevin | Leading role |
| 2020 | Cevin Ağacı | Yaprak | Leading role |

=== Web Series ===
Web series
| Year | Title | Role | Notes |
| 2012–2013 | Behzat Ç. Bir Ankara Polisiyesi | Eylül Fidan | Supporting role |
| 2017 | Fi | Işıl | Guest appearance |
| 2021 | 10 Bin Adım | Selen | Guest appearance |
| 2025 | Magarsus | | Supporting role |

=== Tv Series ===
TV series
| Year | Title | Role | Notes |
| 2000–2003 | Bizim Evin Halleri | Doğa | Supporting role |
| 2005 | Beyaz Gelincik | Meral Ceren Duru/Karakucak/Aslanbaş | Leading role |
| 2005 | Eylül | Zeynep Öğretmen | Supporting role |
| 2007 | Sır Gibi | Deniz | Leading role |
| 2008 | Derdest | Gaye Acar | Leading role |
| 2009 | Ah Kalbim | Candan | Leading role |
| 2010 | Küstüm Çiçeği | Gülten Zeycanlı | Supporting role |
| 2011 | Sen De Gitme | Ceyda Sevi | Leading role |
| 2014 | Ah Neriman | Itır Kamer | Supporting role |
| 2015 | Racon Ailem İçin | Sedef Ercan | Leading role |
| 2015 | Hatırla Gönül | Selma | Supporting role |
| 2016-2017 | Cesur ve Güzel | Cahide Korludağ | Leading role |
| 2017 | Ufak Tefek Cinayetler | Elif Işık | Supporting role |
| 2018 | Babamın Günahları | Melike | Leading role |
| 2018 | Ağlama Anne | Özlem Alan | Leading role |
| 2020 | Kırmızı Oda | Hediye | Supporting role |
| 2021 | Uyanış: Büyük Selçuklu | Zübeyde Hatun | Leading role |
| 2022 | Üç Kuruş | Azade | Supporting role |
| 2022–2023 | O Kız | Sitare Somer | Leading role |
| 2023 | Tetikçinin Oğlu | Huri Malik | Supporting role |
| 2023-2024 | Kudüs Fatihi Selahaddin Eyyubi | Ismat ad-Din Khatun | Supporting role |

=== Short film ===
Short film
| Year | Title | Role | Notes |
| 2005 | Küpeler | Zeynep | Leading role |
| 2014 | Dün Bugün Yarın | | Leading role |

== Theatre ==
Theatre
| Year | Title | Role | Venue |
| | Ay Tedirginliği | | |
| 2014 | Kral (Soytarım) Lear | | |
| 2015 | An - Blink | | |
| 2016 | Cat on a Hot Tin Roof | | |
| 2019 | Evlat | | |
