= Anne (Turkish TV series) =

- Promotional poster
- Also known as: Mother
- Genre: Drama
- Based on: Mother by Yuji Sakamoto
- Written by: Berfu Ergenekon
- Directed by: Merve Girgin Aytekin; Emre Kabakuşak
- Starring: Cansu Dere; Vahide Perçin; Beren Gökyıldız
- Theme music composer: Cem Tuncer; Ercüment Orkut; Nail Yurtsever
- Country of origin: Turkey
- Original language: Turkish
- No. of seasons: 1
- No. of episodes: 33 (85 International Version)

Production
- Producers: Faruk Bayhan; Fatih Aksoy
- Production locations: Bandırma; Istanbul
- Running time: 120 minutes
- Production companies: Med Yapım; MF Yapım

Original release
- Network: Star TV
- Release: October 25, 2016 – June 20, 2017

Related
- Mother (Japan); Mother (South Korea); Imperfect Love (China)

Anne (English title: Mother) is a Turkish drama television series based on the 2010 Japanese drama Mother, starring Cansu Dere, Vahide Perçin, and Beren Gökyıldız. It aired on Star TV from October 25, 2016, to June 20, 2017.

== Synopsis ==
Zeynep Güneş gets a job as a temporary teacher at a local elementary school in city of Bandırma. She soon realizes one of her students, Melek, is suffering from child abuse from her mother, Şule, and mother's boyfriend, Cengiz. When Zeynep realizes that nobody is doing anything to help Melek, she takes matters into her own hands by faking Melek's death, kidnapping her, taking her to Istanbul and attempting to become her new mother. However, when Şule and Cengiz find out Melek is actually alive and kidnap her back, Şule decides to try and force Melek to love her back. As when Şule and Cengiz later have a new baby, Hassan, Melek is forced to take care of him as well as herself. Despite this, Zeynep refuses to give up until she has Melek back with her. Eventually, Şule and Zeynep realize they have to work together to fix all this. The story revolves around Melek's life, Zeynep's identity, and the irreplaceable bond between a mother and daughter.

== Cast ==
- Cansu Dere as Zeynep Güneş
- Vahide Perçin as Gönül Aslan / Sakar Teyze
- Beren Gökyıldız as Melek Akçay / Turna Güneş
- Gonca Vuslateri as Şule Akçay
- Berkay Ateş as Cengiz Yıldız
- Gülenay Kalkan as Cahide Güneş
- Can Nergis as Ali Arhan
- Serhat Teoman as Sinan Demir
- Şükrü Türen as Arif
- Alize Gördüm as Gamze Güneş
- Ahsen Eroğlu as Duru Güneş
- Umut Yiğit Vanlı as Sarp
- Onur Dikmen as Rıfat
- Erdi Bolat as Ramo
- Ali Süreyya as Mert
- Meral Çetinkaya as Mrs. Zeynep Aslan
- Zuhal Gencer Erkaya as Saniye
- Arzu Oruç as Dilara
- Ayşegül İşsever as Serap

== Awards and nominations ==
Year	Award	Category	Nominated work	Result	Ref.
2017	Tokyo Drama Awards	Special Award	Anne	Won	
2017	Golden Butterfly Awards	Best Child Actress	Beren Gökyıldız	Won	
