= Delibal =

- Directed by: Ali Bilgin
- Written by: Yıldırım Türker; Siyah Kalem
- Produced by: Kerem Çatay
- Starring: Çağatay Ulusoy; Leyla Lydia Tuğutlu
- Cinematography: Serkan Güler
- Music by: Sezen Aksu; Ozan Bayraşa
- Production companies: Moon Construction; Ay Yapım
- Distributed by: Warner Bros. Pictures
- Release date: 25 December 2015
- Running time: 117 minutes
- Country: Turkey
- Language: Turkish
- Box office: $6,457,515

Delibal is a 2015 Turkish comedy-drama film directed by Ali Bilgin. Çağatay Ulusoy and Leyla Lydia Tuğutlu starred in the film. It was released on 25 December 2015.

== Plot ==
Barış, who is an architecture student and makes music as a hobby, is a bipolar patient and enjoys enjoying life. When he first saw Füsun, he had a feeling he had never known in his life. Love, which is always tangential, has caught Barış this time. Who is this girl who made him taste love? He wants to reach this girl, whose name he does not even know, but whom he falls in love with, somehow, and he reaches... Finding Füsun, reaching is also complete; Füsun, who has nothing in her mind other than finishing university with a degree and doing a master's in America, also needs to be convinced of love. Barış, who is handsome, smart and sincere, finally achieves this. He makes Füsun fall in love with him and they get married. Everything is like in fairy tales. Until one day the fairy tale breaks down.....and he disappears leaving a confused Füsun and his distraught parents.

As Barış is a bipolar patient, his illness drives him crazy. He keeps having hallucinations, his behaviors and emotions drastically changed frequently. His medications always makes him numb and unfeeling, which rise Füsun's suspicsion about his fidelity. As everyone is worried about Barış's wellbeing, Haider visits Füsun to tell her about his bipolar disease and how he once almost harmed Haider unintentionally. Haider's words finally sunk into her when she connects the dots about his mood swings, extreme emotions, detachment. She finally remembers what might have triggered him.

In flashback it shows, one evening he persuades her to go on a bike ride with him after a very tiring day. Although she was against, his enthusiasm finally makes agree to go in a short ride. There he loses his control over speed while chasing his own high, Which leaves Füsun scared of him. When he finally registers her fear for him in her eyes, his world shatters. His drive to keep her happy prompts him to film a last video for her and he finally commits suicide.

Füsun finds the CD where Barış confesses his feelings, fears and his desire to protect her, even from him. He couldn't protect himself from his demons, how he could protect her - so he has to go. Although he is regretful about not keeping his promise to forever, he hopes she would forgive him soon. His parting words were being madly in love is like a poison that might have killed her if he was around her. In another scene, police finally finds Barış's body concluding his death.

== Cast ==
- Çağatay Ulusoy - Barış
- Leyla Lydia Tuğutlu - Füsun
- Hüseyin Avni Danyal - Tarık
- Nazan Kesal - Selma
- Mustafa Avkıran - Hayri
- Laçin Ceylan - Macide
- Bahtiyar Engin
- Zafer Akkoyun - Haydar
- Defne Kayalar
- Toprak Sağlam - Filiz
- Baturalp Yılmaz - Gitarist
- Mert Carım - Ahmet
- Barış Aytaç - Onur
- Ali Seyitoğlu - Tunç
- Kıvılcım Ural - Nisan
- Emre Karaoğlu - Taner

== Soundtrack ==
Çağatay Ulusoy sang the song "Mutlu Sonsuz" for the film. The lyrics belong to Sezen Aksu and it was composed by Ozan Bayraşa. "Mutlu Sonsuz" became a hit and successful performance. The song has 52 million views as of October 2021. It became one of the most played songs on the radio, and broke a record by ranking first among the top 10 songs played on digital platforms, outranking songs by artists such as Soner Kabadayı, Demet Akalın, Birol Namoğlu, Göksel and Gülben Ergen.
