= Serhat Teoman =

Turkish actor

- Born: 4 June 1983 (age 43); Diyarbakır, Turkey
- Education: Dokuz Eylül University
- Occupation: Actor
- Years active: 2003–present
- Height: 1.86 m (6 ft 1 in)

Serhat Teoman (born 4 June 1983) is a Turkish actor.

== Life and career ==
Teoman is a graduate of Dokuz Eylül University School of Fine Arts with a degree in performing arts studies. He received his master's degree in theatre studies from Mimar Sinan University. He started his career on television in early 2000s. While continuing to appear on stage, he was cast in several TV series. In 2012, a breakthrough in his career came with his role in the popular series Kuzey Güney, in which he portrayed the character of Burak Çatalcalı. Teoman continued his career with a leading role in Acil Aşk Aranıyor as Dr. Sinan and then appeared in Kaçın Kurası series as Barış. In 2017, he was cast in a recurring role in the TV series Anne. During the years 2018–2019, Serhat Teoman played in the TV series Kızım with Buğra Gülsoy and Tugay Mercan. In 2020, he had a leading role in the TV series Çocuk.

Aside from his career in television, he was a member of Tiyatro Kutu together with Buğra Gülsoy, Fatih Sönmez and Emre Erkan. After Tiyatro Kutu's dissolution, Teoman, Gulsoy and Erkan founded GET Production. In 2023, Serhat Teoman and Buğra Gulsoy founded ART 12 Entertainment.

=== Television ===
Year	Title	Role	Network
2026	Veliaht	Ömer Karslı (Faroz)	Show TV
2024	Aşk, Evlilik, Boşanma	Çınar Tabipoğlu	NOW
2024	Eşas Oğlan	Mert	GAİN
2022	Oğlum	Sedat	Show TV
2020–2021	Menajerimi Ara	Serkan Tahtacı	Star TV
2019–2020	Çocuk	Ali Kemal Karasu	Star TV
2018–2019	Kızım	Cemal Eröz	TV8
2017	Anne	Sinan Demir	Star TV
2016	Kaçın Kurası	Barış Akçam	ATV
2015	Acil Aşk Aranıyor	Sinan Akyürekli	Show TV
2015	Acil Servis	Sinan Akyürekli	Show TV
2013	Bugünün Saraylısı	Savaş Ataman	ATV
2012–2013	Kuzey Güney	Burak Çatalcalı	Kanal D
2011	Gün Akşam Oldu	Tarık Ungan	Show TV
2010	Bitmeyen Şarkı	Mesut Günalan	ATV
2009	Uygun Adım Aşk	Selçuk	Fox
2008	Gece Gündüz	Kerem	Kanal D
2008	Hepimiz Birimiz İçin	Egemen	Kanal D
2008	Kız Takımı	Tolga Gülen	Fox
2007	Avrupa Yakası	Kerem	ATV
2007	Yemin	Ali Sonat Kanyon	Fox
2006	Yalancı Yarim	Cenk	Star TV
2006	Ah İstanbul	Tunca	ATV
2005	Kanlı Düğün	İlker Soydan	Show TV
2003	Kurşun Yarası	Yunan askeri	ATV

== Filmography ==
- Sevmek Yüzünden 2024
- Karanlıktan Kaçış 2024
- Mahalle 2017

=== Short film ===
- Randevu
- Aşkın Dört Kuralı
- Tutulma
- Son Karar

== Theatre ==
- Cırcır Böcekleri İtler ve Biz - 2023-2026 /ART12ENT
- İnsan Kulağı - 2018 /Tiyatro DOT
- Pragma - 2012 /GET
- Ceasar Bir Denge Oyunu - 2010 /Tiyatro Kutu
- Dorian Gray "yeniden doğuyor"- 2010 /Tiyatro Kutu
- Antigone - 2009 /Tiyatro Kutu
- Dalga - 2007–2008 /Donkişot Theatre

== Awards ==
- Marmara University School of Communications - 9th Short Film Contest / Best Actor
- Galatasaray University Communications Club - Sinepark Short Film Festival / Best Actor
- 12. Afife Theatre Awards - New Generation in Theatre Special Award/ Dalga (2008)
