= Heo Jung-eun =

South Korean actress

- Born: September 14, 2007 (age 19); South Korea
- Other name: Heo Jeong-eun
- Occupation: Actress
- Years active: 2011–present
- Agent: J-Wide Company

Korean name
- Hangul: 허정은
- Hanja: 許廷恩
- RR: Heo Jeongeun
- MR: Hŏ Chŏngŭn

Heo Jung-eun (Korean: 허정은; born September 14, 2007) is a South Korean actress. She first drew public attention with her performances in hit dramas, My Lawyer, Mr. Jo (2016) and Love in the Moonlight (2016). At age nine, she took on her first leading role in television as Geum-bi, a girl who has childhood Niemann–Pick disease in My Fair Lady (2016).

== Filmography ==
=== Film ===
Year	Title	Role	Notes	Ref.
2011	Once in a Blue Moon			
2013	Montage	Bom		
2014	A Hard Day	Min-a		

=== Television series ===
Year	Title	Role	Notes	Ref.
2011	Only Because It's You	Kang Jin-joo (young)		
2013	Wonderful Mama	Kim Ha-pil		
2014	Angel Eyes			
2014	Temptation	Kang Sung-a		
2014	Shining Romance	Byeon Yoon-do		
2015	Heart to Heart	Cha Hong-do (young)		
2015	My Heart Twinkle Twinkle	Lee Soon-soo (young)		
2015	Hyde Jekyll, Me	Jang Ha-na (child)		
2015	A Girl Who Sees Smells	Ji-eun		
2015	Divorce Lawyer in Love			
2015	Splendid Politics	Princess Jeongmyeong (young)		
2015	All About My Mom	Lee Jin-ae (young)		
2016	My Lawyer, Mr. Jo	Jo Soo-bin		
2016	Love in the Moonlight	Princess Yeongon		
2016	My Fair Lady	Yoo Geum-bi		
2018	Mr. Sunshine	Ko Ae-shin (young)		
2018	100 Days My Prince	Yoon Yi-seo/Yeon Hong-shim (young)		
2018	The Ghost Detective	Sunwoo Hye (young)		
2019	My Lawyer, Mr. Jo 2: Crime and Punishment	Jo Soo-bin	Cameo	
2019	Arthdal Chronicles	Tan Ya (young)		
2020	Start-Up	Seo Dal-mi (young)		
2021	River Where the Moon Rises	Princess Pyeonggang (young)		
2021	Hometown	Moon Sook		

== Discography ==
=== Soundtrack appearances ===
Year	Title	Peak chart positions	Sales (Digital)	Album
Year	Title	KOR Gaon	Sales (Digital)	Album
2016	"Snow This Year" (스노우 인 디스 이어)	—		My Fair Lady OST
"—" denotes releases that did not chart or were not released in that region.

== Awards and nominations ==
Award	Year	Category	Nominated work	Result	Ref.
KBS Drama Awards	2016	Best Young Actress	My Lawyer, Mr. Jo, Love in the Moonlight, My Fair Lady	Won	
KBS Drama Awards	2016	Best Couple (with Oh Ji-ho)	My Fair Lady	Won	
KBS Drama Awards	2018	Best Young Actress	The Ghost Detective	Nominated	
