= Uyanış: Büyük Selçuklu =

2020s Turkish television series

- Also known as: The Great Seljuks; The Great Seljuks: Guardians of Justice; Nizam-ı Alem; Awakening: The Great Seljuks
- Genre: Historical; Action; Adventure
- Based on: Seljuk Empire
- Written by: Serdar Özönalan; Emre Konuk
- Directed by: Sedat İnci
- Creative director: Emre Konuk
- Starring: Buğra Gülsoy; Ekin Koç; Hatice Şendil; Gürkan Uygun; Sezin Akbaşoğulları; Sevda Erginci; Mehmet Özgür
- Theme music composer: Gökhan Kırdar
- Opening theme: "Uyanış: Büyük Selçuklu Jenerik"
- Composer: Batuhan Fırat
- Country of origin: Turkey
- Original language: Turkish
- No. of seasons: 1
- No. of episodes: 34

Production
- Producer: Emre Konuk
- Running time: 120–150 minutes
- Production company: Akli Film

Original release
- Network: TRT 1
- Release: 28 September 2020 – 31 May 2021

Related
- Alparslan: Büyük Selçuklu

Uyanış: Büyük Selçuklu (pronounced [ujænɯʃ byjyk seltʃuklu], lit. 'Awakening: Great Seljuk') is a Turkish historical drama television series, written by Serdar Özönalan, directed by Sedat İnci and produced by Emre Konuk. It focuses on the life of Malik-Shah I, and his son, Ahmad Sanjar. It tells the story of the Seljuk Empire's structure, political events and how it became an Islamic state. In the series Turkish actor Buğra Gülsoy portrays Sultan Malik-Shah, and Ekin Koç portrays Sanjar. The television series premiered on 28 September 2020 and ended on 31 May 2021.

The series was filmed on the TRT International Film Studios at various locations including Sakarya, Istanbul and Kocaeli. Turkish musician Gökhan Kırdar composed the opening theme while Kazakh musicians composed other music using instruments from the Turkic world. The television series went through a 13-month preparation time in which details were meticulously planned, although The Great Seljuks: Guardians of Justice includes a few historical inaccuracies. In 2021, the production company Akli Film was accused of mistreating its set workers. The television series has been heavily impacted by the COVID-19 pandemic in Turkey.

The show has been well received in Turkey, being called a "record-breaking television series", and has been compared with other series. The Great Seljuks: Guardians of Justice gained popularity in Turkey because of the casting of famous actors, and it has become popular in countries like Bangladesh, Pakistan and Kyrgyzstan. The show won the Anatolia Media Awards in 2020, while Konuk won the Crystal Globe Awards in the same year.

== Premise ==
The show depicts the rise of the Seljuks under Sultan Malik-Shah I and his son Ahmad Sanjar, later Sultan of the Seljuk Empire. It focuses on their struggles and battles against Hassan-i Sabbah, leader of the Order of Assassins (dubbed the "Batinis"), the Byzantine Empire and fellow rival states that seek to weaken the Seljuks. Sencer has seen Turna Hatun, daughter of an Emir, who refuses to give her to him in marriage, but finally relents. Malik-shah is married to Terken and Zubeyde. Terken is heavily pregnant with her son, and Elcin Hatun has come to the palace. She is jealous of Elcin, lest she may marry Malik-shah and give him a son, therefore he will lose attention in Terken. When she tries to prove that and is not good and goes to where Maliks-hah is. She is urging the driver to go faster and faster but then the horses skid and drop the carriage. Terken is taken back to the palace when her daughter and ordered to stay in bed till her baby is born. She gets up trying to go after Elcin in her dream. While she is running after what she sees, her water breaks and she goes in labour. Her newborn son dies soon after birth. Afterwards she becomes pregnant again and she gives birth screaming, but the baby lives. Meanwhile, they find out that Malik-Shah's wife who everybody even Malik-Shah thought was dead is alive. She is the mother of Sencer and Tapar. Malik-Shah at first is very angry but then he calms down.

Tapar's wife Gevher also gives birth to a girl named Fatima. Later on Turna gives birth to a girl called Zeynep. They go for a big war, eventually conquering Queli Castle. The drama finishes with Sencer and Tapar leaving Isfahan and becoming Emirs.

== Cast ==
Many of the characters are fictionalized depictions of Seljuk historical figures.

=== Main ===
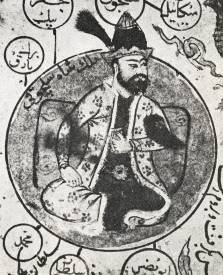
Malik-Shah I

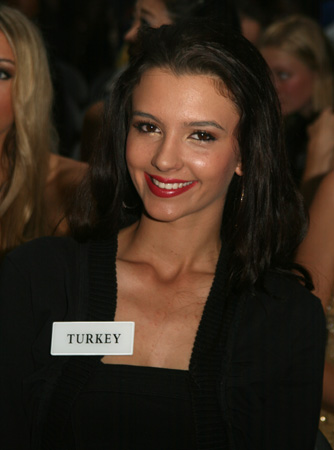
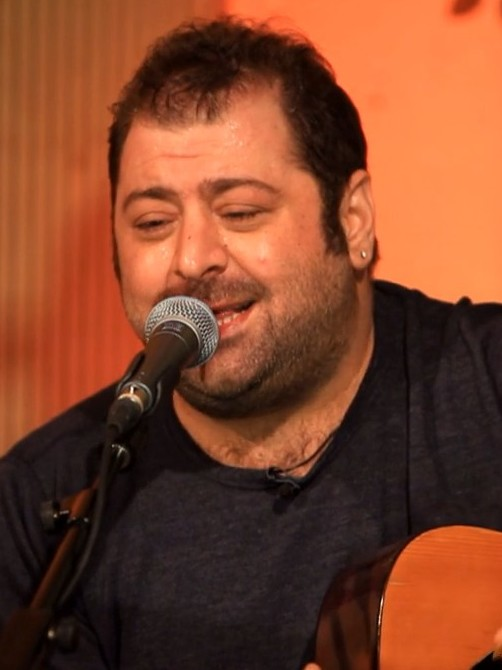
(L to R), Hatice Şendil plays the role of Terken Hatun, Leyla Lydia Tuğutlu plays the role of Elçin Hatun, and Erdem Akakçe plays the role of Behram
- Buğra Gülsoy as Sultan Malik-Shah I, 3rd ruler of the Great Seljuk Empire. (Note: "Melikşah". TRT 1 (in Turkish). Retrieved 14 March 2021.) Despite filming during the COVID-19 pandemic, Gülsoy brought his family to the set to celebrate his birthday. In an interview with Anadolu Ajansı, Gülsoy reflected that he believed young people were becoming more interested in the Seljuk history because of the show.
- Ekin Koç as Ahmed Sencer, based on Ahmad Sanjar, the son of Malik-Shah I. Ahmed has become a fan-favorite character because of his strong sense of self. In the show he is depicted as the "bravest hero of the Seljuk state". (Note: "Sencer". TRT 1 (in Turkish). Retrieved 14 March 2021.) Filming of the episode "Selçuklu Demek" was delayed after Koç tested positive for COVID-19.
- Hatice Şendil as Terken Hatun, a character based on Terken Khatun, the wife of Malik-Shah I. Terken tries to dominate the Seljuk state after her marriage to Melikşah. (Note: "Uyanış: Büyük Selçuklu". TRT 1 (in Turkish). Retrieved 14 March 2021.) (Note: "Terken Hatun". TRT 1 (in Turkish). Retrieved 14 March 2021.) Şendil praised the extent of COVID-19 precautions the production put in place.
- Gürkan Uygun as Hasan Sabbah, the show's primary antagonist, based on Hassan-i Sabbah, founder of the Nizari Ismaili state. (Note: "Hasan Sabbah". TRT 1 (in Turkish). Retrieved 14 March 2021.)
- Sevda Erginci as Turna Hatun, based on Terken Khatun (Ahmad Sanjar's wife) who is Sencer's lover and later his wife.
- Mehmet Özgür appears as Nizamülmülk, a character based on Nizam al-Mulk, a vizier of the Seljuk Empire. (Note: "Nizâmülmülk". TRT 1 (in Turkish). Retrieved 14 March 2021.) The character's depiction has been criticised by history professor Muharrem Kesik for its historical inaccuracies, and for the incongruities between the character's role and the real duties of a vizier; in one episode, Nizâmülmülk is seen performing an autopsy, which a surgeon would have undertaken.
- Sezin Akbaşoğulları as Zübeyde Hatun, a character based on Zubayda Khatun, another of Malik-Shah I's wives.

=== Recurring ===
- İlker Kızmaz as Arslantaş Alp, a character based on Emir Arslantaş, one of Malik-Shah's commanders.
- Ali Gözüşirin as Muhammed Tapar, a character based on Muhammad I Tapar, the son of Malik-Shah I.
- Pınar Töre as Başulu Hatun, a character based on Taj al-Din Khatun who is the mother of Ahmed and Muhammed, and Melikşah's wife.
- Bülent Alkış as Ömer Hayyam, a character based on Omar Khayyam, an Iranian poet and philosopher who advised Malik-Shah. Following Ömer's appearance on the show, there has been renewed interest in the works of Khayyam.
- Leyla Feray as Gevher Hatun, Tapar's wife, based on Gohar Khatun.
- Volkan Keskin as Bozkuş, a fictional character, a soldier serving Sencer.
- Mehmet Bozdoğan as Tâcülmülk, a character based on Taj al-Mulk, a vizier of the Seljuk Empire. His loyalty lies with Terken.
- Buse Meral as Mâh Melek Hatun, based on the real daughter of Terken Khatun and Malik-Shah, although there is little information about her.
- Cemal Toktaş as Gazzâlî, a character based on Islamic philosopher Al-Ghazali, in the series he is shown as a disciple of Yusuf Hemedanî.
- Özer Tunca as Yusuf Hemedanî, a character based on the Islamic philosopher Yusuf Hamadani, his depiction in the series is similar, but portrayed as extremely holy.
- İsmail Ege Şaşmaz as Faysal, a fictional character who acts as Hasan Sabbah's spy in the Seljuk Empire.
- Buçe Buse Kahraman as Livya, a fictional character who enters the Seljuk state as an innocent young woman, but with intentions of destroying it.
- Kaan Taşaner as Mitras, a fictional character from the Byzantine Empire who vows to destroy the Turks, leading him to be an enemy of Melikşah.
- Kaan Taşaner as Marcus, Mitras's twin brother who appears after his death.
- Atılgan Gümüş as Melik Tekiş, a character based on Malik Takish, one of the sons of Alp Arslan.
- Janbi Ceylan as Aydoğdu, a fictional character shown to be loyal to Ahmed.
- Taner Turan as Emir İlteber, a fictional character who is shown as the father of Turna Hatun, and a man appointed by the Seljuks to watch over Şelemzar.
- Çiğdem Selışık Onat as Seferiye Hatun, based on Safariyyah Khatun. The wife of Alp Arslan and mother of Melikşah, Seferiye is based on Alp Arslan's real wife, though little is known about her.
- Leyla Lydia Tuğutlu as Elçin Hatun, the daughter of Kutalmışoğlu Süleyman Şah and sister of Kılıçarslan who seeks to wreak havoc in the Seljuk palace. The character was described as "attractive", which was criticized for objectifying women, especially as this would not have been said during the period.
- Nik Xhelilaj as Yorgos, a fearless Byzantine commander who sees the Seljuks and the Turks as those who are responsible for his brother's death resulting in him hating them. Xhelilaj is an Albanian actor.
- Murat Garipağaoğlu as Abd'ûl-Melik bin Attaş, a character based on Abdul Malik bin Attash, an Ismaili leader.
- Osman Sonant as Andreas, a fictional character who is the commander of a Byzantine castle.
- Aytek Şayan as Rüstem, a fictional character who was taken from his parents as a child by the Batinis (Hasan Sabbah's men; assassins) and raised as a militant, he becomes one of the most dedicated Batinis. He is Arslantaş's long-lost brother.
- Ertuğrul Postoğlu as Korkut Ata, a character based on Korkut Ata, a semi-mythical scholar. In the series, he is shown as the Bey of the Kınık tribe.
- Erdem Akakçe as Behram, a fictional character shown to be Hasan Sabbah's assistant.

=== Guest ===
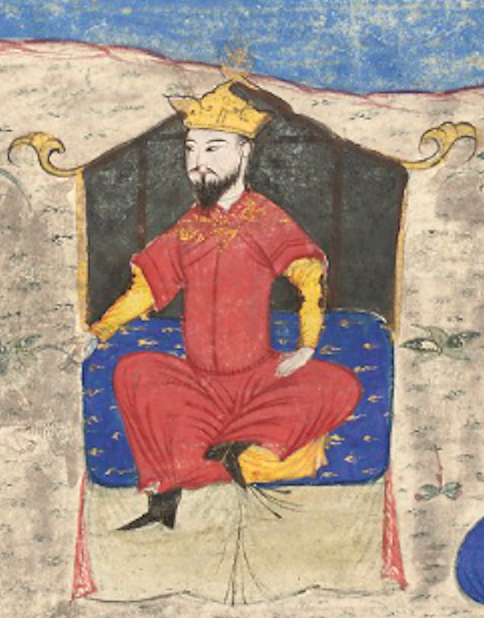
Alp Arslan

- Serdar Kılıç as Sultan Alparslan, a character based on Alp Arslan, a ruler of the Great Seljuk Empire.
- Ogün Kaptanoğlu as Turanşah, Melikşah's hostile cousin and son of Qavurt. The character based on Turan Shah I of Kirman. Kaptanoğlu's guest appearance was announced by journalist Birsen Altuntaş before it was confirmed.
- Abdül Süsler as Baturalp Bey, the Bey of the Kipchaks and brother of Başulu Hatun.

== Episodes ==
No. overall	No. in season	Title	Directed by	Written by	Original release date	Turkey ranking (viewers)
1	1	"Episode 1"	Sedat İnci & Emre Konuk	Emre Konuk & Serdar Özönalan	28 September 2020	1
Melikşah's father Alp Arslan is killed after conquering Berzem, with Melikşah taking the throne. Melikşah's wife, Başulu Hatun, is claimed to have died of childbirth, with her son Ahmed surviving (both actually alive and hidden by Nizamülmülk). Nizamülmülk tells Melikşah to give up his son as he would not be accepted into the Seljuk dynasty due to Seljuk-Kipchak tensions. After eighteen years, Melikşah is targeted with assassination but is saved by his son, renamed Sencer, although Melikşah does not recognise him. It is later claimed that the Anatolian Turkmens carried out the attack. Nizamülmülk does not believe this but Melikşah orders that the Turkmen Elçin Hatun, sister of the Turkmen leader Kiliçarslan, be brought to the palace. Melikşah summons Nizamülmülk to Başulu's supposed grave, demanding to see his son Ahmed.
2	2	"Episode 2"	Sedat İnci & Emre Konuk	Emre Konuk & Serdar Özönalan	5 October 2020	1
Nizâmülmülk tells Sencer and his elder brother Tapar to visit the Turkmen to collect Elçin, who agrees to come and be questioned. Sencer, Tapar and Elçin are ambushed on their way to Isfahan, although they fight their way out of the ambush. Melikşah also attempts to reunite with his son at a mill, although chooses not to.
3	3	"Episode 3"	Sedat İnci & Emre Konuk	Emre Konuk & Serdar Özönalan	12 October 2020	1
Upon Elçin's arrival, in a meeting, she is questioned by Melikşah and it is proved that she is innocent, but is ordered to stay in the palace much to Terken's anger. Melikşah assumes the Turkmens carried out the attack without Elçin's knowledge, and declares war on them. Emir İlteber's daughter Turna is asked by Sencer to treat his mother, to which Turna disobeys her father and agrees, going to the Kınık tribe, causing a confrontation between İlteber and Sencer.
4	4	"Episode 4"	Sedat İnci & Emre Konuk	Emre Konuk & Serdar Özönalan	19 October 2020	1
Sencer infiltrates İlteber's mansion in order to save the captured Batinis Rüstem and Aralantaş (a Seljuk agent) as part of his infiltration of the Batinis, although he is caught by Turna. Melikşah meets with Sencer, who reveals that the Batinis were involved in the attempt to kill Melikşah.
5	5	"Episode 5"	Sedat İnci & Emre Konuk	Emre Konuk & Serdar Özönalan	26 October 2020	2
After the meeting, Sencer plans a trap for the Batinis. However, Tapar, unaware of Sencer being a Seljuk spy and his real brother, attempts to kill Sencer, being stopped by Melikşah. Byzantine commander Andreas decides to attack Melikşah's men with the help of the Batinis.
6	6	"Episode 6"	Sedat İnci & Emre Konuk	Emre Konuk & Serdar Özönalan	2 November 2020	3
Sencer is forced by the Batinis to target Imam Ghazali, shooting him, although Nizâmülmülk and Sencer foil the plot in a hoax assassination. Elçin, in the Seljuk palace, attempts to rescue Kiliçarslan from imprisonment, and is angered when Emir Ebul-Kasim, an enemy of her father Süleyman Şah, requests to marry her.
7	7	"Episode 7"	Sedat İnci & Emre Konuk	Emre Konuk & Serdar Özönalan	9 November 2020	1
Sencer, Tapar and Seljuk forces raid the Batinis for relics of Fatimah, although Sencer is ambushed by Byzantine troops, led by Yorgos, who seeks revenge for his brother being killed by Sencer. Yorgos seizes the relics and pushes Sencer off a cliff.
8	8	"Episode 8"	Sedat İnci & Emre Konuk	Emre Konuk & Serdar Özönalan	16 November 2020	2
The wounded Sencer is found and brought by Tapar to the Kınık tribe. Turna rushes to cure Sencer, leaving the tribe to collect herbs where she finds Yorgos, who has developed romantic feelings for her and thus kidnaps her. In the palace, Melikşah's mother Seferiye Hatun investigates Terken's plans, detaining her maid. Meanwhile, Hassan Sabbah kills Abdul Malik bin Attash, and seizes his position as the Batini Head Dai.
9	9	"Episode 9"	Sedat İnci & Emre Konuk	Emre Konuk & Serdar Özönalan	23 November 2020	2
After receiving the news that Yorgos has kidnapped Turna, Sencer detains Byzantine official Shahbender Dukas to learn Yorgos' location. Yorgos and Sencer fight, during which Turna is severely injured and Sencer's attention being on her, whilst Yorgos escaped with the sacred relics. As the relics begin to cause problems for the Seljuks, Seferiye is poisoned by Terken and becomes mentally ill, ending Seferiye's investigations into her.
10	10	"Episode 10"	Sedat İnci & Emre Konuk	Emre Konuk & Serdar Özönalan	30 November 2020	1
Sencer infiltrates Kuvel Castle to retrieve the stolen relics from Yorgos, however he is caught by Andreas. After escaping, he kills Yorgos and takes the relics. Meanwhile, Terken becomes suspicious if Başulu is actually alive and if Melikşah has had a son from her. Her suspicions are inflamed when she sees a cradle in the house in which Başulu stayed during her exile days. Elçin brings Ebul Kasim's spy to the palace in an attempt to prevent tensions between the Turks and the Seljuks.
11	11	"Episode 11"	Sedat İnci & Emre Konuk	Emre Konuk & Serdar Özönalan	7 December 2020	1
Melikşah tasks his commander, Emir Bozan, to hunt down and kill Ebul Kasim after he is revealed to be cooperating with Commander Andreas. Kasim thus attempts to flee with Yorgos, although both are hunted down together by Sencer and Bozan and killed, with Sencer retrieving the relics. However, Shahbender Dukas and his wife are murdered by the Batinis, who frame Sencer, provoking Byzantine and public anger against him. Meanwhile, Tapar, his wife Gevher, Turna and Elçin investigate Seferiye's poisoning, but Terken manages to cover her tracks. Sencer arrives in the Seljuk palace and gives the relics to Melikşah, only to be arrested.
12	12	"Devletin Kılıcı"	Sedat İnci & Emre Konuk	Emre Konuk & Serdar Özönalan	14 December 2020	2
Dukas' son, Anton, finds a Batini necklace at the site of his mother's murder. He attempts to go to Kuvel Castle to inform Commander Andreas, but is stopped by Byzantine guards, causing him to escape towards Kuvel himself. Batini leader Hassan Sabbah orders Anton's capture, although Nizamülmülk rescues Anton, recovering the necklace as evidence in Sencer's trial. At the trial, Imam Ghazali finds Sencer innocent and the Batini Rüstem is declared the murderer of Dukas' wife. Melikşah tasks Sencer to hunt down Rüstem, although Rüstem is saved by Sencer's alp Arslantaş, having been told by the Batinis that Rüstem is his long-lost brother. The Batinis also trick Arslantaş into believing Nizamülmülk killed his father, causing Arslantaş to stab Nizamülmülk.
13	13	"Episode 13"	Sedat İnci & Emre Konuk	Emre Konuk & Serdar Özönalan	21 December 2020	2
As Nizamülmülk is treated for his wounds, Melikşah orders Arslantaş's arrest, although Sencer protects him, realising he was tricked. Emir Taculmulk is sent to arrest Sencer, although Sencer escapes and breaks his arm after Taculmulk slaps Başulu. Meanwhile, in Şelemzar, the Batinis initiate large explosions, destroying stored steel. In the wake of this, Hassan Sabbah sends his adoptive son Faysal to harass Emir İlteber, forcing him to unknowingly surrender key parts of the city to the Batinis. Meanwhile, Terken poisons and paralyses Nizamülmülk to stop him from assisting Elçin and Gevher's investigation into her, framing Turna for this. After visiting Yusuf Hemedani, Arslantaş realises the Batinis tricked him, whilst Hemedani prevents Melikşah from seeing Sencer's mother. (Note: Sencer's mother is Melikşah's estranged wife Başulu, unknown to Melikşah.) Melikşah eventually finds Sencer and confronts him.
14	14	"Cenk Vakti"	Sedat İnci & Emre Konuk	Emre Konuk & Serdar Özönalan	28 December 2020	1
Melikşah and Sencer are ambushed by the Byzantines. After the battle, Sencer escapes to find a book of Batini secrets, with Tapar pursuing him. Sencer and his men also go after a disguised Hasan Sabbah to rescue Arslantaş's captive mother from the Batinis, although Arslantaş's brother Rüstem kills his own mother. Tapar eventually arrests Sencer and his men in Şelemzar, with Arslantaş capturing Rüstem and surrendering himself and his brother. Meanwhile, Melikşah declares war on the Byzantines after discovering Commander Andreas' involvement in the Şelemzar explosions. In the ensuing battle, Melikşah defeats the Byzantine forces and kills Andreas.
15	15	"Dava Yolunda"	Sedat İnci & Emre Konuk	Emre Konuk & Serdar Özönalan	4 January 2021	1
Having killed Andreas, Melikşah goes to Kuvel Castle and imposes strict conditions on the emperor's brother Prince Isaakios. However, Melikşah is attacked by the Crusader commander Markus as he returns, with his arm being wounded, although is eventually saved by Hassan Sabbah and Taculmulk. Melikşah slaps the pair for not preventing the attack sooner. Meanwhile, Nizamülmülk recovers and has Sencer freed to pursue the Batinis' book of secrets, whilst Arslantaş reveals Rüstem threw it into a river. After Rüstem is hanged to death, Melikşah dismisses Arslantaş as a Seljuk soldier. Meanwhile, Elçin finds a witch that made the substance that poisoned Nizamülmülk, although the witch is killed and Elçin is framed by Terken, causing both Elçin and Terken to be summoned before Melikşah, whilst Sencer catches Sabbah attempting to retrieve the Batini book of secrets.
16	16	"Uyanış: Büyük Selçuklu"	Sedat İnci & Emre Konuk	Emre Konuk & Serdar Özönalan	11 January 2021	1
Taculmulk forces Terken's maid Firdevs to write a letter claiming sole responsibility for poisoning Seferiye and Nizamülmülk before killing her, sparing Terken from execution and sending Elçin to Anatolia, although Melikşah replaces Terken as Seljuk Head Hatun with his other wife Zübeyde Hatun. Meanwhile, in Şelemzar, Sabbah's adoptive son Faysal offers to clear Emir İlteber's debts in exchange for marrying Turna, whilst Markus ambushes Sencer and Sabbah, but is defeated with the arrival of Tapar and Nizamülmülk. The Batinis subsequently help Markus attack a Kınık caravan, killing the tribe Bey, Korkut Ata, and wounding Başulu, whilst Nizamülmülk catches Sabbah attempting to escape with the Batini book of secrets, exposing him as a Batini.
17	17	"Uyanış Günü"	Sedat İnci & Emre Konuk	Hasan Erimez & Serdar Özönalan	18 January 2021	1
Sabbah reveals he is the leader of the Batinis, before fleeing Isfahan with the help of his Batini network and Taculmulk. Sabbah heads for a vault of secret Seljuk information, to retrieve the information and provide it to the Crusaders, with Tapar, Sencer and Melikşah pursuing him. Meanwhile, Zübeyde Hatun visits the Kınık tribe to meet Sencer's mother, leading her to discover that Başulu is alive, and that Sencer is Melikşah's son. This leads to Zübeyde threatening to reveal this secret. As Melikşah pursues Sabbah, he is ambushed by the Crusaders and inflicted with poison, causing him to collapse as Sencer and his men are ambushed by Sabbah.
18	18	"Devlet İçin"	Sedat İnci & Emre Konuk	Hasan Erimez & Serdar Özönalan	25 January 2021	1
The crusaders save Hassan Sabbah. Sencer is ambushed by Batinis and Marcus, Tapar comes in time to save Sancer. Terken Hatun gets pregnant. Zubeyde Hatun is upset about Basulu and Sencer's secret and asks Nizamulmulk to tell him the secret. Sencer goes after the crusaders and Batinis for the stolen gold bars. Maliksha's hand is healed. Ayaz is captured by Batinis. Maliksha is poisoned during the clash with crusaders.
19	19	"Uyanış Rüyası"	Sedat İnci & Emre Konuk	Hasan Erimez & Serdar Özönalan	1 February 2021	1
Sancer and his men are saved by the fighters from Kinik tribe but Melksha is poisoned. Sabbah escapes with his wounded son Faysal. In the palace Zubeyde Hatun takes charge. Sultan is taken to Kinik tribe for treatment. Sabbah raids the vault and takes the secret documents to Markus. Turna prepares the antidote for Sultan. Terken Hatun goes to Kinik tribe to see the Sultan. Sencer, Tapar and Nazimulmulk reach the meeting place where the documents are being given to the crusaders by Sabbah.
20	20	"Yeni Bir Uyanış"	Sedat İnci & Emre Konuk	Serdar Özönalan	8 February 2021	1
Sabbah and Marcus escape from the battle and the count Albert is captured. Malikshah recovers. Arslantas is restored to his previous position. Zubeyde Hatun tells Sencer that she knows who he is but will not reveal it to Sultan now. Sultan makes Sencer the head of the Kinik tribe. The caravan with weapons is raided by Marcus and Sabbah's men on the information given by Taculmulk to Sabbah. Turna's father is poisoned by the Batini doctor. Melik Tekis brother of Maliksha comes to the palace and taunts Sultan about the problems he is facing in the palace and tells him that he knows that he has a secret son from Basulu Hatun.
21	21	"Birlik Vakti"	Sedat İnci & Emre Konuk	Serdar Özönalan	15 February 2021	1
Turna's father dies from poison. Sencer and Meliksha plan an attack and recover the weapons and springs needed for the catapults from the crusaders. Melik Tekis ( Maliksha brother) tries to create problems and is looking for ways to dethrone Maliksha. There is a rebellion in Selemzar prompted by Sabbah's son and is put down by Sencer and his soldiers. The workshop setup to build weapons under Tapar's command is raided by Marcus and his soldiers, Tapar is heavily wounded.
22	22	"Uyanış Günü"	Sedat İnci	Serdar Özönalan	22 February 2021	1
Sultan asks Sencer and Nazimulmulk to go and avenge Tapar and his soldiers. Tapar is in critical condition and Zubeyde Hatun convinces Basulu to come to the palace and see Tapar. Tapar is healed. Sultan and Sencer's plan to capture Marcus and his men fails as Melik Tekis ambushes Count Albert and wounds him. Sultan goes to Melik Tekis tribe and unarms him and his soldiers as a punishment. Kilicarslan brother of Elcin Hatun is freed and sent to Anatolia under a plan to capture Markus and ward off Byzantine moves towards Anatolia. Marcus is trapped and killed by Meliksha.
23	23	"Vakti Gelen Sır"	Sedat İnci	Serdar Özönalan	1 March 2021	1
Melik Tekis is planning a rebellion but some Beys don't agree with him. Sencer marries Turna. Prince Isakious plans an ambush on Malikshah but Sabbah comes and talks him out of it. The Hajj caravan is raided by Byzantines and they kill everyone. Taculmulk is left wounded. Terken and Gevher try to open Basulu's grave but are stopped in time by Zubeyde Hatun. The trident is returned by Sultan to Kuvel castle. Tapar tricks Basulu and Sencer to come to the grave site of Basulu where he discovers the secret of his mother.
24	24	"Hesaplaşma Vakti"	Sedat İnci	Serdar Özönalan	8 March 2021	1
Tapar discovers that Basulu is alive and confronts them. When the Beys gather on Sencers call they are attacked by Byzantine soldiers and all the Beys are killed. Prince of Kuvel Isakois is poisoned as the trident is laced with poison. The tribes are infuriated because of their beys' deaths and Malik Tekis flares up the situation. Tapar goes to Sultan to reveal his mother's secret but then changes his mind. Tapar is angry with everyone because he thinks he was betrayed by his family for not telling him about his mother. Sencer lays the trap to catch Melik Tekis but Taculmulk warns Melik Tekis and saves from meeting Prince Isakious. Marcus' twin brother Mithras comes to Kuvel and kills Prince Isakious in revenge for his brother and becomes the new ruler of Kuvel. Livia is trapped by Byzantines while Sencer plans to capture Anthony. Meliksha goes to Melik Tekis tribe to punish the Beys who disobeyed his order. Sabbah follows Tapar and learns about his mother Basulu.
25	25	"İçerideki Hain"	Sedat İnci	Serdar Özönalan	15 March 2021	1
Sultan is told that his mother Saferiyeh Hatun is on her death bed and has been brought to the palace, he immediately leaves for the palace. Melik Tekis request Meliksha to allow him to see his mother too. Saferiyeh Hatun dies at the palace beside the family. Mithras finds out that Sultan has send a fake trident. Hassan Sabbah is planning his evil moves. Thomas is kept at Kinik tribe and Mithras asks Melik Tekis to rescue him before Sencer takes him to the Sultan. Zubeyeda Hatun is ambushed but her lady guards and soldiers kill the Byzantine soldiers. Hayyam is wounded by his helper who is a Bitini when he is caught stealing the new calendar Hayyam was working on. Sencer traps Melik Tekis who ambushes Sencer when he is taking Tomas to the palace, Meliksha and Tapar join in the ambush and reveal the traitor Melik Tekis.
26	26	"Selçuklu Demek"	Sedat İnci	Serdar Özönalan	29 March 2021	1
After his brother, Melik Tekiş's betrayal for the Seljuk throne is proved with the help of Sencer, Melikşah has to face him and give him a punishment. Hasan Sabbah follows Tapar into the Kınık tribe and finds him secretly meeting his mother Başulu Hatun storming plans into Sabbah's mind so that he could put the Seljuks into a series of problems. Terken also finds out that she will have a baby boy, she rushes to Melikşah with the news.
27	27	"Geçmişin İzinde"	Sedat İnci	Serdar Özönalan	5 April 2021	1
Meliksha spares Melik Tekis life after defeating him. Busulu Hutun is kidnapped by Sabbah and his son. Melik Tekis is blinded by Sultan as punishment for his rebellion.Count Albert becomes Muslim and is named Abdullah Ali. Faysal attacks Selemzar with the help of Mithras and kills all the guards there and takes over the city. Sabbah comes to Selemzar with Busulu Hatun. Tajulmulk learns that Busula has been captured and is Sencer's mother who is Sultan's wife. He reveals the secret to Terken Hatun. Sabbah wants the Khilat and Selemzar for the release of Busulu Hatun. Sencer and Tapar go into Selemzar to save Busulu hatun but are met with Sabbah and his men. Sabbah threatens to kill Basulu Hatun if he is not given the Khilat and Sanjac by tomorrow. Ali sends a secret message to Sultan from Selemzar that Sencer's mother is being held as a captive by Batinis. Sultan gives the Khilat and Sanjac to Sencer for return of the hostages. Ali saves Busulu Hatun while Batinis a celebrating their victory on the streets. Meliksha comes from behind and attacks Sabbah who thinks that he was tricked and tries to attacks Sencer and Tapar. Ali brings Busulu to the palace. Sultan asks Basulu to show her face and recognizes her.
28	28	"Episode 28"	Sedat İnci	Serdar Özönalan	12 April 2021	TBA
Meliksha calls Nizamulmulk to his presence to explain why he kept the secret about Basulu and Sencer from him. Sultan gets mad with Nazimulmulk and asks him to leave the palace. Basulu and Sencer are treated bad at the palace and Sultan refuses to see Basulu. Terken Hatun tauts Basulu that she is a spy. Basulu, Sencer and Nazimulmulk leave the palace for the tribe. Hassan Sabbah goes to Melik Tekis to heal him and tells him that Basulu is alive and Meliksha has an illegitimate son Sencer. Sabbah also send the news about Basulu to Meliksha's cousin Turansha who was a contender for throne. There is lot of chaos in the dynasty because of Basulu secret, Melik Tekis and Turanshah are aligned to take Sultan down. Tapar and Sencer attack the caravan carrying firework sent from Kuvel to Sabbah in Selemzar. Sultan and is army is held back by Turansha who has captured Nizamulmulk and wants to execute him in front of Sultan. While Tapar and Sencer open the doors of Selemzar and wait for Sultan they are captured by Sabbah and Batinis in Selemzar.
29	29	"Episode 29"	Sedat İnci	Serdar Özönalan	26 April 2021	TBA
Ali comes in and rescues Sencer, Tapar and his men. Sencer shoots an arrow and wounds Sabbah and breaks the encirclement which allows his men and Tapar to get out of Selemzar. In the meantime Terken Hatun keeps poisoning rest of the family against Zebyda Hatun and Sencer. Nizamulmulk is wounded by Turansha and taken to Kinik tribe for healing. Meliksha attacks Selemzar but is repelled by Batinis using Rum fire. Sultan prepares towers with camel skin and sand to avoid the Rum fire which he learned from the fire masters they had captured earlier. The place they are building towers is raided by Faysal and his men, they wound Ali and kill Ayaz. Meliksha takes his army along with Sencer and Tapar to attack Selemzer but before he arrives, he is met with Melik Tekis and Turansha who tell him that they have already captured Selemzar.
30	30	"Episode 30"	Sedat İnci	Serdar Özönalan	3 May 2021	TBA
Melik Tekis tricks Sultan in believing that he took Selemzar by sword and has killed all the Batinis. Sultan believes that by inspecting Selemzar himself. Sultan goes back and hands Selemzar to Melik Tekis but plans to take it back. Sultan calls Sencer, Basulu Hatun and Nizamulmulk to the palace and learn about his decision about their fate. Nazimulmulk is returned to his old position, Sencer is declared as Melik and Basulu is told that the palace gates are always open for her. Tapar is angry that he did not get Selemzar and instead Melik Tekis was given the right to rule it. Sultan plans to take back Selemzar and punish Toransha. Toransha is captured when he comes to take over Isfahan and Melik Tekis is captured in Selemzar.
31	31	"Episode 31"	Sedat İnci	Serdar Özönalan	10 May 2021	TBA
It is Toransha's men who attack and capture Melik Tekis and Sabbah in Selemzar. Melik Tekis's son escapes and goes to Mithras for help to free his father and Sabbah. Mithras goes to the cave and saves Melik Tekis and Hassan Sabbah before Sencer and Tapar arrive. Aydogdu is killed by Mithras as Tapar leaves the place he was told to stay. Melik Tekis and Sabbah go back and take over Selemzar. Sultan is furious with Sencer and Tapar for failing to capture Sabbah and Tekis. Toransha is excused and set free because he had caught Tekis and Sabbah. Geyher gives birth to a daughter. Batinis attack inside Isfahan and take away the drawings of the towers. Sencer builds the towers without the drawings and attacks Selemzer.
32	32	"Episode 32"	Sedat İnci	Serdar Özönalan	17 May 2021	TBA
Inside Selemzer Sencer and Tapar are trapped by Batinis and Byzantines. Sultan comes from behind and attacks Selemzer. Selemzar is taken over by Sultan, Faysal is killed by Sencer during the fight in Selemzar. Melik Tekis is captured by Turansha while escaping Selemzar and brought before Sultan who asks Toransha to punish him. Tapar is made the Emir of Selemzer. Terken Hatun gives birth to a son Mehmut. Terken Hatun is planning with Taculmulk ways to counter Sencer, Tapar and Nizamulmulk in the Kuvel campaign. Ali is captured by Byzantines on his way to Sencer workshop where he is building catapults. Byzantines and Sabbah setup a trap to ambush Sencer and Tapar but Meliksha comes from behind and ruins their plan.
33	33	"Episode 33"	Sedat İnci	Serdar Özönalan	24 May 2021	TBA
33- Mithras and Sabbah escape from the battle field. Ali escapes from the cave. Meliksha is wounded in the battle and taken to Kinik tribe for treatment. Sabbah goes to Basulu's brother Baturalp Head of Kipcak Turks and provokes him against Meliksha. Baturalp Bey heads towards Kinick tribe to take Basulu Hatun. Baturalp leaves without Basulu but threatens Meliksha to change the heir of his throne to one of his nephews Tapar or Sencer or get ready for war. Baturalp captures Suljuk soldiers and wants Meliksha to come to him and negotiate a deal. Sencer and Tapar go instead and threaten Baturalp with consequences and free the captive soldiers. Sabbah's men kill two of Baturalps's soldiers and put the blame on Suljek soldiers. Basulu Hatun leaves the tribe and goes to Baturalp to stop the war. When Sabbah learns about it he ambushes Baturalp on his way and kills his soldiers and tries to kill Baturalp and capture Basulu but Sultan, Sencer and Tapar arrive to save them from Batinis.
34	34	"Episode 34"	Sedat İnci	Serdar Özönalan	31 May 2021	TBA
Sultan saves Baturalp and Basulu. In the battle Meliksha chops off Sabbah's finger but Sabbah's men save him and he escapes. Basulu Hatun is asked by Sultan to move to palace. Terken Hatun is captured by Zubeyda Hatun while she is taking her soldiers in the forest. Sabbah's headquarters are destroyed and as a revenge Sabbah asks his servants to assassinate Sultan when he is praying with his people. Sencer discovers about the plan by capturing the informant. Sencer and Tapar go to Isfahan and kill the Batinis who are tried to assassinate Sultan. Sultan plans to attack Kuvel. Terken Hatun and Taculmulk are brought before the Sultan. Taculmulk is exiled from the palace and all the responsibilities are taken away from Terken Hatun. Sultan attacks Kevul and defeats the Byzantines. Sencer is made the Emir of Khorasan and Tapar Emir of Anatolia.

== Production ==
The series has attracted attention with its actors, costumes, historical locations and story. The Great Seljuks: Guardians of Justice is written by Serdar Özönalan, directed by Sedat İnci and produced by Emre Konuk. After three years of scenario work, every detail was meticulously prepared over 13 months. 350 décor employees, 100 carpenters and a team of 60 people took part on two separate backlots, in which many locations in the series were built. 5000 accessories and costumes, of which 3500 pieces belong to the period, were manufactured in special costume workshops. The Great Seljuks: Guardians of Justice is the most costly television series produced in Turkey after Diriliş: Ertuğrul. Two cities are built on three backlots and the enormous budget also includes construction fees and the actors' fees. It is produced by Akli Film, a production company new to the Turkish television industry who has been working with TRT for three years. The production company says that it has a guaranteed contract with TRT for at least 33 episodes or one season. If the series continues, it is expected to have five or six seasons.

=== Casting ===
The series includes many popular Turkish actors including Buğra Gülsoy, one of the lead actors, who was noted to have celebrated his birthday on set with his family. After Barış Arduç met with the producer of The Great Seljuks: Guardians of Justice, he was expected to join the cast. When Hatice Şendil, who portrays the role of Terken Hatun, was asked if Arduç would be joining the cast in the season finale, she said, "I don't know, but I think he will be [joining the cast]". Arduç is still rumoured to appear in the series in the role of Berkyaruk. The cast of another popular Turkish television series Çukur have been said by Turkish media to be leaving the series "one by one" to join The Great Seljuks: Guardians of Justice. The television series also cast an Albanian actor Nik Xhelilaj to play the role of Yorgos. Buğra Gülsoy, and other members of the cast were interviewed about what they thought of the show. Gülsoy said, "I think that the new generation has started to investigate the Seljuk period again thanks to the series." It was also rumoured that Kenan İmirzalıoğlu, who is interested in history, would join the series' cast however, he responded to these theories in an announcement saying that he wouldn't be joining. Birsen Altuntaş reported in May 2021 that Sevda Erginci and İsmail Ege Şaşmaz would leave the series after the first season, but Abdul Süsler would join the series in the final episodes in the role of "Kıpçak Bey".

==== Training ====
The actors received horse riding and sword training by the action director of the Kazakh Nomad Stunts team, who choreographed Hollywood movies for a month. The actors, who worked on fitness, continuity and coordination, went through a challenging training program in this process. Janbi Ceylan, who portrays Aydoğdu, was also responsible for the horse-training of the cast.

=== Filming ===
According to the producer Emre Konuk, the series is filmed on the TRT International Film Set" It was specifically filmed at various locations including Sakarya, Istanbul and Kocaeli. The Great Seljuks: Guardians of Justice came to the screen with the longest battle scene and production details in Turkish television history. A total of 400 actors, excluding the main ones, 100 of them on horseback, took part in the battle scene. Preparation took 60 days, and the shooting took eight days. The actors received horse riding and sword training by the action director of the Kazakh Nomad Stunts team, who choreographed Hollywood movies for a month. The actors who worked on fitness, continuity and coordination went through a challenging training program during this process.

For the battle scene in the first episode, 45 stuntmen and 120 supporting actors were given tough action and choreography training by Nomad Stunts for 15 days at the shooting location. During the shootings, ambulances, medical teams and veterinarians were present in case of any negative situation. The horse trainers provided by the Nomad Stunt team travelled around various cities of Anatolia, and only 15 horses among 150 horses, which were available for training, were included in the project. Horses were trained for a period of one month. Archery training was provided to the cast by a different company. In 2021, around 260 set workers left their jobs accusing Akli Film of leaving them with difficult working conditions, lack of payment, lack of hygiene and being subject to mobbing. Although the production company promised to solve the issues experienced by the set-décor workers, Turkish media said they took no action. Organisations later took notice criticising Akli Film and asking them to listen to their demands as soon as possible. In a statement, Konuk said that Azerbaijani Culture Minister Anar Karimov visited the set. According to journalist Birsen Altuntaş, the first season of the series will end with 36 episodes, while other sources say that the same journalist said that there will be 33 episodes.

==== Impact of the COVID-19 pandemic ====
Much to fans' disappointment, TRT 1 suspended filming of the show for five days which delayed the release of the 26th episode for a week after a COVID-19 outbreak at the set. TRT officials said the film Pocket Hercules: Naim Süleymanoğlu would be broadcast instead on TRT 1 for the first time. The statement released was;

As a result of regular tests of our series' cast and crew, COVID-19 cases were detected on the set of The Great Seljuks: Guardians of Justice. The health of our quarantined set workers is good and closely monitored. The news was shared with our cast and all our set staff and it was decided to suspend filming of our series for 5 days. Due to this mandatory break, the new episode of The Great Seljuks: Guardians of Justice will not be broadcast on Monday 22 March 2021. On the same day and time, the film Pocket Hercules: Naim Süleymanoğlu, for the first time on TV, will be on TRT 1 screens. We would like to thank our viewers in advance for their understanding and support. It is announced with respect for the public."

There were rumours that the season was ending however, the episode later premiered on 29 March 2021. It was later announced after a few days that filming "Selçuklu Demek" was delayed when Ekin Koç, who portrays the role of Ahmed Sencer, tested positive for the disease. Hatice Şendil, who portrays Terken Hatun, praised the COVID-19 precautions made by The Great Seljuks: Guardians of Justice. Because of the rise of COVID-19 cases in Turkey, the production of the 29th episode was also delayed.

=== Music ===
"It was a project that I enjoyed and loved very much. I congratulate our producer, director and the entire team for all the scenes that have been finely and carefully created and the visual feast they have served. I researched but also, imagined, the music used in the [Seljuk] period and I tried to bring together tunes in accordance with the spirit of the period and the scenes presented."

— Gökhan Kırdar, one of the composers
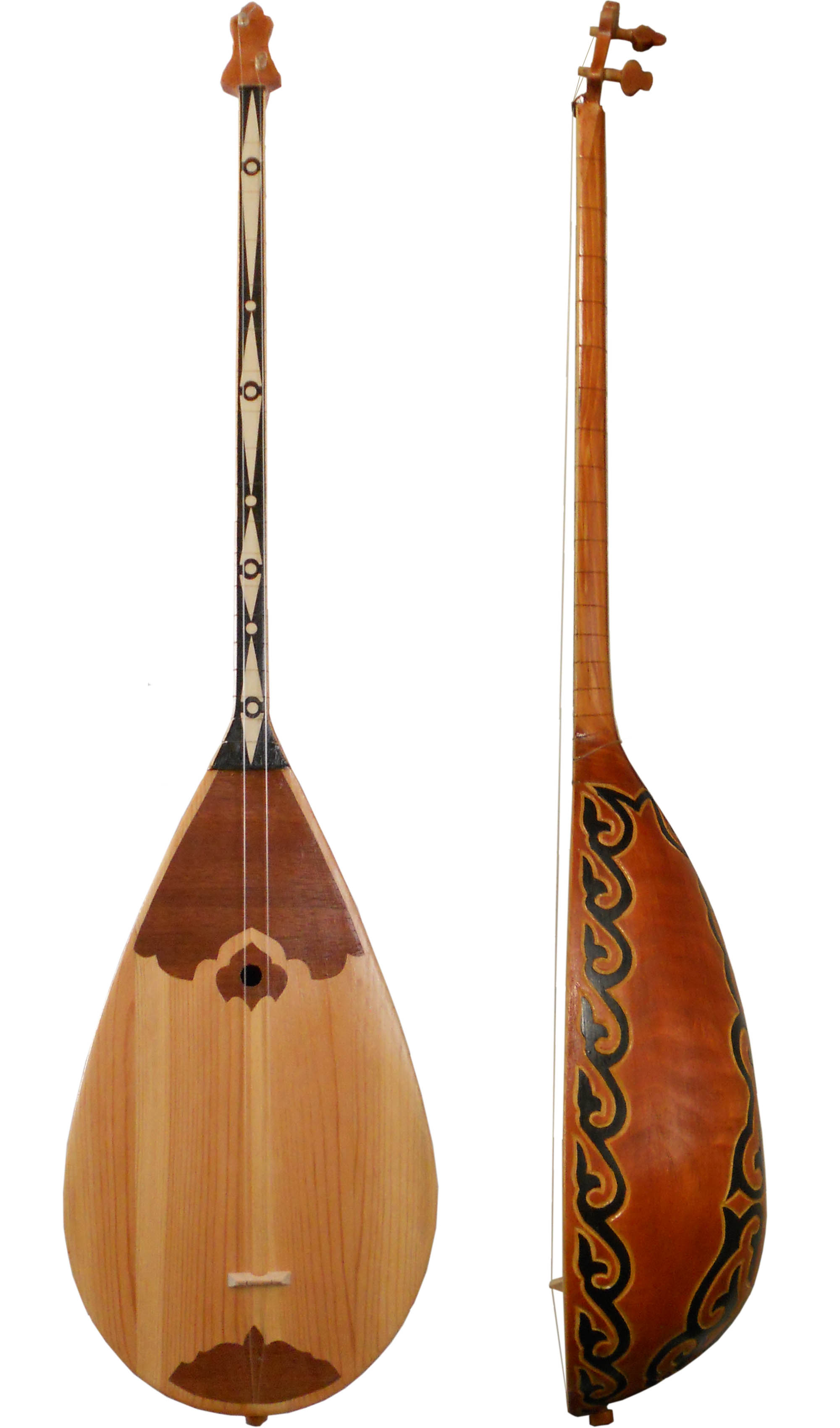
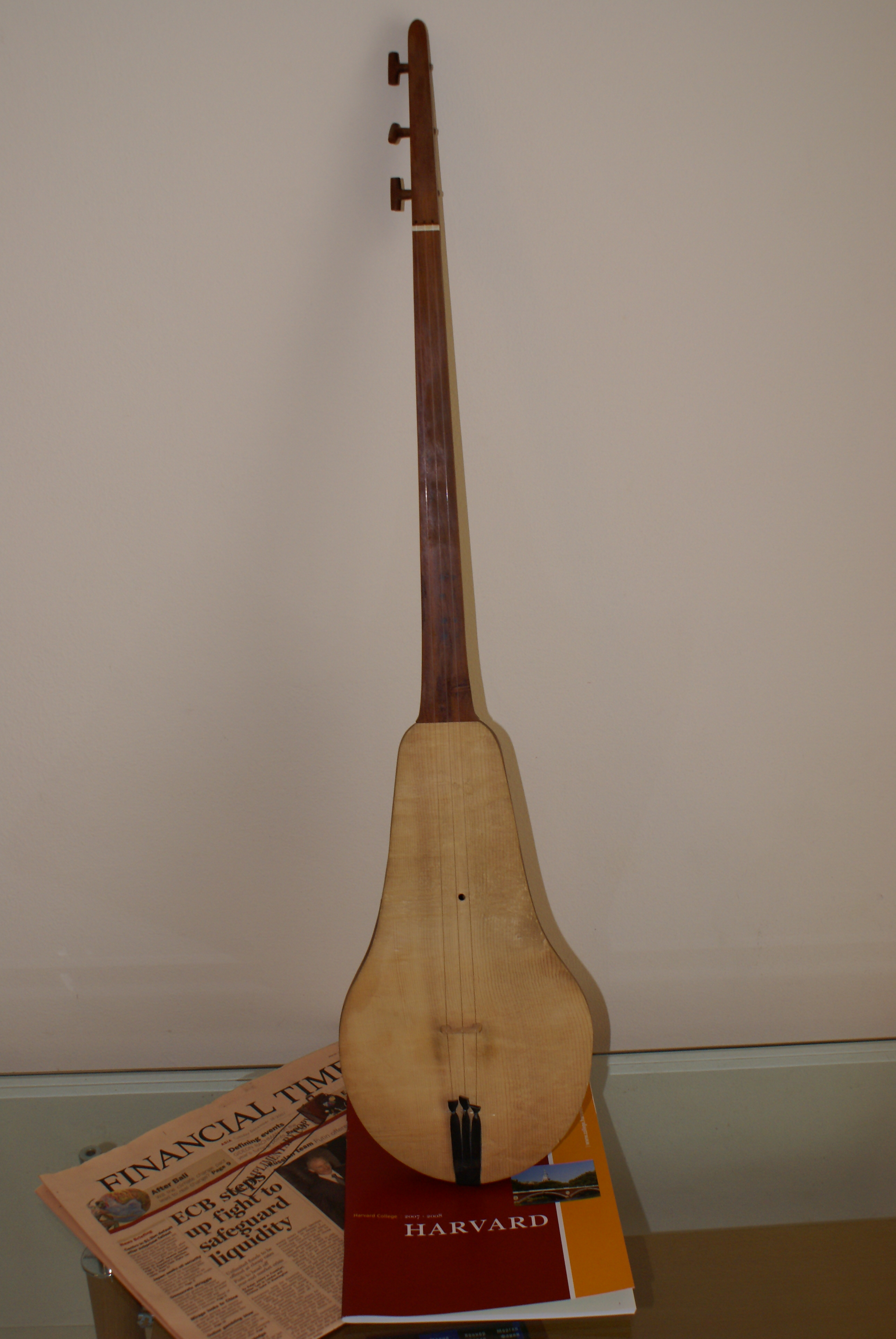
(L to R), the Kazakh dombra and the komuz were used in the series

While the compositions for the series were prepared to reflect the atmosphere of the scenes, the music was played with the instruments used in the Turkic world. Musicians who performed using Central Asian instruments such as the dombra, kyl kyyak, komuz, and sybyzgy were featured in the works supported by master musicians in Kazakhstan and Kyrgyzstan. Kazakh composer Ercan Arkabay, who starred in the Kuruluş: Osman series, also said that he will be doing something for The Great Seljuks: Guardians of Justice. The album of first season music was released on 30 October 2020. In a statement, Gökhan Kırdar, one of the composers, stated that he was happy that he was involved in a great project that would reflect the period in which a unique civilization was built. The eulogy performed by the disciples of Gazzâlî was sung by Turkish musician Mehmet Öncel. Ermek Kazıbekov, a member of the team of Kyrgyz youth dubbing the series in their native language, said that he was impressed by the fact that traditional Kyrgyz instruments were used in the series. There are 71 tracks. The first track is by Gökhan Kırdar, nine tracks are by Hassak, a world-famous Kazakh band that were there to add "colour" to the songs, and the rest are by Batuhan Fırat. This is a list of selected songs:

No.	Title	Artist(s)	Length
1.	"Uyanış: Büyük Selçuklu Jenerik (Awakening: The Great Seljuks generic)"	Gökhan Kırdar	1:51
2.	"Kostak Ali Zeybeği"	Batuhan Fırat	3:15
6.	"Savaş Alanı (Field of War)"	Batuhan Fırat	2:54
47.	"Amanat"	Hassak	3:56
58.	"Selçuk Doğan"	Batuhan Fırat	2:34

While the compositions of the series were prepared according to the atmosphere of the stages, the music was played with the instruments used in the Turkic world. Musicians who performed using Central Asian instruments such as dombra, bristle, komuz, and sibizgi were featured in the works supported by master musicians in Kazakhstan and Kyrgyzstan. The album was released on 30 October 2020.

=== Historical accuracy ===
Emre Konuk confirmed he had to do a lot of research on the historical figures presented in the series. However, the TV series has a few historical inaccuracies. One is that the Seljuk state has been shown to be run by a nomadic tribe and that the Seljuks began to shed blood from the first episode when they actually were a people of peace. Turkish media has accepted that The Great Seljuks: Guardians of Justice is not a documentary but a historical TV series meaning and can include many fictionalised features.

== Reception ==
Like other Turkish TV series revolving around history, The Great Seljuks: Guardians of Justice has been popular in Bangladesh and Pakistan. It was also well received in Kyrgyzstan. A group of Kyrgyz youth decided to dub the series in their native language.

=== Critical response ===
The 13th episode attracted great attention with a particular scene and the 23rd episode of the "record-breaking TV series" was eagerly awaited by Turkish fans. The series, whose first episode reached the top of the ratings in Turkey, was so well-received it was the only Turkish TV series to be included in the daily hits section of newspaper The Wit. Arab journalist Mohammed Abu Rumman compared it with other Turkish television series including Kuruluş: Osman, Kurtlar Vadisi, Payitaht: Abdülhamid and Diriliş: Ertuğrul, which became popular globally. As mentioned, the television series has been well received in Bangladesh. Speaking to Anadolu Ajansi, a Bengali professor stated that the Turkish television series revolved around history, including The Great Seljuks: Guardians of Justice should be watched by people of all ages. Muharrem Kesik says that The Great Seljuks: Guardians of Justice, which contains many historical inaccuracies, is not a documentary but a historical TV series meaning that it can include many fictionalised features.

=== Accolades ===
Year	Award	Nominee	Category	Result	Ref.
2020	Anatolia Media Awards	The Great Seljuks: Guardians of Justice	Best TV Series of the Year	Won	
2020	Crystal Globe Awards	Emre Konuk	Best Producer of the Year	Won	

== Prequel ==
A prequel series, focusing on the life of Alp Arslan, was released on 8 November 2021.

== See also ==
- List of Islam-related films
- List of Turkish television series
- Television in Turkey
