= Heo Yool =

South Korean actress (born 2009)

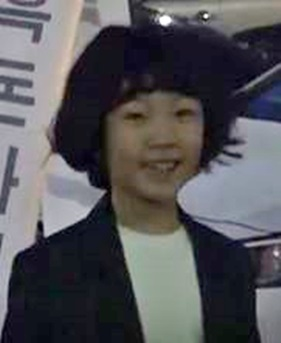
- Heo in 2018
- Born: August 29, 2009 (age 17); South Korea
- Occupation: Actress
- Years active: 2018–present
- Agent: Elrise

Korean name
- Hangul: 허율
- RR: Heo Yul
- MR: Hŏ Yul

Heo Yool (Korean: 허율; born August 29, 2009) is a South Korean teenage actress. She is best known for starring in the television drama Mother (2018).

== Career ==
In 2018, she beat out 400 other children to play the main character in the television drama Mother, which gained international recognition through the nomination in the 1st Canneseries TV Festival. Also she was the youngest in the TV category at 54th Baeksang Arts Awards and won Best New Actress. Since March 2018, she signed a contract with Elrise.

== Filmography ==
=== Film ===
Year	Title	Role	Ref.
2020	The Closet	Yi-na	

=== Television series ===
Year	Title	Role	Note	Ref.
2018	Mother	Kim Hye-na / Kim Yoon-bok		
2018	The Guest	Jung Seo-yoon	Episodes 8-9	
2020	Sweet Home	Kim Su-yeong	Seasons 1–2	

== Awards and nominations ==
Year	Award	Category	Nominated work	Result	Ref.
2018	54th Baeksang Arts Awards	Best New Actress – Television	Mother	Won	
