= Zubayda Khatun =

Wife of Malik-Shah I, mother of Berkyaruq

- Consort of the Seljuk sultan
- Born: 1056
- Died: 1099 (aged 42–43); Ray, Seljuk Empire
- Spouse: Malik-Shah I
- Children: Berkyaruq; Gawhar Khatun
Names
- Zubayda Khatun Yaquti
- House: Seljuk
- Father: Yaquti
- Religion: Islam

Zubayda Khatun (1056 – 1099) was a granddaughter of Dawud Chaghri Beg, wife and cousin of Malik-Shah I. She was the mother of Sultan Berkyaruq.

== Biography ==
Zubayda was born to Emir Yaquti, son of Chaghri Beg. She married and influenced her cousin Malik-Shah I, giving birth to Berkyaruq in 1081 and a daughter, Gawhar Khatun. After Berkyaruq became the Seljuk Sultan, Zubayda's brother-in-law Tutush I rebelled. After Berkyaruk suppressed the rebellion and killed his uncle, he wanted to bring his mother with him, although his vizier Mu'ayyid al-Mulk opposed this. As a result of this, Mu'ayyid al-Mulk was dismissed and his brother Fakhr al-Mulk was appointed as the vizier. Berkyaruq's brother Muhammad Tapar later rebelled and declared himself as Sultan, reappointing Mu'ayyid al-Mulk, who had Zubayda Khatun captured and killed.

== In popular culture ==
Zubayda Khatun is portrayed by Sezin Akbaşoğulları in the Turkish historical drama The Great Seljuks: Guardians of Justice.

== See also ==
- Terken Khatun (wife of Malik-Shah I)
