= Episode 13 (Uyanış: Büyük Selçuklu) =

- Uyanış: Büyük Selçuklu episode
- Promotional poster featuring Gürkan Uygun as Hasan Sabbah
- Episode no.: Season 1 Episode 13
- Directed by: Sedat İnci & Emre Konuk
- Written by: Emre Konuk & Serdar Özönalan
- Original air date: December 21, 2020
- Running time: 2 hours, 23 minutes

Guest appearances
- Yunus Çakıroğlu; Görkem Koçin

Episode chronology
← Previous "Episode 12"	Next → "Episode 14"

"Episode 13", less commonly known by its title "Uyanış Yolu", is the thirteenth episode of the first season of the Turkish historical action series Uyanış: Büyük Selçuklu, written by Serdar Özönalan, directed by Sedat İnci and produced by Emre Konuk. The episode premiered on 21 December 2020 and it was an episode that reached second place of the rating in Turkey.

== Plot ==
As Nizamülmülk is treated for his wounds, Melikşah orders Arslantaş's arrest, although Sencer protects him, realising he was tricked. Meanwhile, in Şelemzar, huge explosions destroy areas where steel is kept. Commander Andreas, who is given an ultimatum by the Emperor in Constantinople, seeks to discredit Melikşah in front of Emir İlteber. During all this, the women in the palace attempt to stop other schemes.

== Production ==
The episode was directed by Sedat İnci & Emre Konuk and was also written by the latter along with Serdar Özönalan. Staff writing credits go to Yesim Aslan, Özlem Atasoy, Hasan Erimez and Faruk Emre Özünlü. "Episode 13" was the only episode to be shared online before coming on television screens.

== Reception ==
The episode reached second place of the ratings in Turkey, which was a drop from the last few episode in which the series attracted higher rankings. The episode attracted a total viewership of 8.86, an AB viewership of 9.75, and a 20+ABC1 of 9.79.
