= Rüzgar =

Rüzgar is a Turkish given name and surname. In Turkish, 'rüzgar' means 'wind'. Notable people with the name include:

== People ==
=== Given name ===
- Rüzgar Aksoy, Turkish actor
- Rüzgar Erkoçlar (born 1986), Turkish former actor

=== Surname ===
- Kemal Rüzgar (born 1995), Turkish-German footballer
- Necla Rüzgar, Turkish painter

== Other ==
- Rüzgar-class fast attack craft, craft class in the Turkish Navy
