= Beren Gökyıldız =

Turkish actress (born 2009)

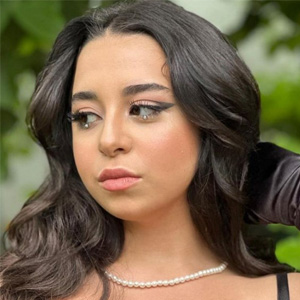
- Born: 29 September 2009 (age 17); Istanbul, Turkey
- Occupation: Actress
- Years active: 2014–present
- Awards: Golden Butterfly Best Child Actress (2016)

Beren Gökyıldız (born 29 September 2009) is a Turkish actress. She is mainly known for her role as Ayşe in the television series Bizim Hikaye and as Melek in Anne.

== Biography ==
Beren Gökyıldız was born on 29 September 2009 in Istanbul. She is continuing her education at primary school. She started her acting career by appearing on Fox TV's series Kocamın Ailesi, and won the favor of the audience with her character.

Despite her young age, she was able to give a successful performance and later appeared on Show TV's Güldüy Güldüy Show. She then got a role on Star TV's series Anne as Melek Akçay, and shared the leading role with Vahide Perçin and Cansu Dere.

== Filmography ==
Cinema
| Year | Title | Role | Notes |
|---|---|---|---|
| 2016 | Boşu Bir Yerde | Elmas | Leading role |
| 2018 | Bal Kaymak | Bade | Leading role |
| 2025 | Köstebekgiller: Ata Tohumu Muhafızları | Deniz / Denny | Leading role |
| 2026 | Deniz Kızı Marmara | Ayça | Leading role |
Television
| Year | Title | Role | Notes |
| 2014–2015 | Kocamın Ailesi | Pelin | Supporting role |
| 2016 | Güldüy Güldüy Show | Herself | Theater actress |
| 2016–2017 | Anne | Melek Akçay / Turna Güneş | Leading role |
| 2018 | Bizim Hikaye | Ayşe | Supporting role |
| 2018–2019 | Kızım | Öykü Göktürk | Leading role |
| 2020 | Mucize Doktor | Betüş | Guest appearance |
| 2020 | Çocukluk | Mavi / Şirin | Leading role |
| 2023 | Yeşil Vadi'nin Kızı | Melissa Çelik | Leading role |
| 2024 | Kopuk | Azra | Supporting role |

== Awards ==
| Year | Award | Category |
|---|---|---|
| 2015 | Istanbul Gelisim University Media Awards | Most Favorite Child Actress of 2015 |
| 2016 | 43rd Pantene Golden Butterfly Awards | Best Child Actor |
| 2017 | Bilkent University Television Awards | Best Child Actress |
| 2017 | Mimar Sinan Fine Arts High School | Best Child Actress of the Year |
