= Cumbadan Rumbaya =

1960 film

Cumbadan Rumbaya is a 1960 Turkish film based on a 1936 novel by Peyami Safa. It was directed and written by Turgut Demirağ with screenwriter Server Bedii, and stars Çolpan İlhan and Vahi Öz. The film was remade in 2005 as a three episode TV Mini-Series starring Halit Akçatepe and Selda Alkor.

== Cast ==
- Çolpan İlhan
- Efgan Efekan
- Vahi Öz
- Kadriye Tuna
- Mürüvet Sim
- Sadri Alisik
- Faik Coskun
- Mahmut Erki
- Renan Fosforoglu
- Ziya Keskiner
- Adile Nasit
- Eyüp Sabri
- Mualla Sürer
- Cevat Taysi
- Tacettin Uygun
