= Saving Grace (Philippine TV series) =

2024 Philippine drama television series

- Promotional poster for the extended version
- Genre: Drama
- Based on: Mother by Yuji Sakamoto
- Written by: Hazel Karyl Mandanguit-Uychiat; Li Candelaria; David Franche Diuco
- Directed by: FM Reyes; Dolly Dulu
- Starring: Julia Montes; Zia Grace Bataan; Sharon Cuneta; Janice de Belen; Sam Milby; Jennica Garcia; Christian Bables; Eric Fructuoso; Elisse Joson
- Music by: Len Calvo; Adriane Macaliday
- Country of origin: Philippines
- Original language: Filipino
- No. of episodes: 14; 78 (The Untold Story)

Production
- Executive producers: Carlo L. Katigbak; Cory V. Vidanes; Laurenti M. Dyogi; Roldeo T. Endrinal; Kylie Manalo-Balagtas; Rondel P. Lindayag
- Producers: Ronald Dantes Atianzar; Catherine Magdael-Abarrondo; Camille Rosales-Navarro
- Production location: Puerto Princesa, Palawan
- Cinematography: David Anthony Diaz Abaya; Videlle Briones Meily
- Editor: Jay Mendoza
- Camera setup: Single-camera
- Running time: 56–60 minutes; 21–29 minutes (The Untold Story)
- Production companies: Dreamscape Entertainment; Nippon TV (Note: copyright holder only)

Original release
- Network: Amazon Prime Video
- Release: November 28, 2024 (Note: It was released in the United States on November 27, 2024.) – January 9, 2025
- Network: Kapamilya Channel (cable and satellite TV only) (Note: The extended version of the series, subtitled as "The Untold Story" is also broadcast on A2Z (analog free TV in Manila and digital TV in nationwide), TV5 (free TV in nationwide), and Jeepney TV (delayed telecast, cable and satellite TV only). It is also available for streaming on Kapamilya Online Live, and iWantTFC, and internationally via TFC.)
- Release: March 3 – June 20, 2025

Related
- Mother

Saving Grace is a Philippine drama television series produced by Dreamscape Entertainment. Directed by FM Reyes and Dolly Dulu, it stars Julia Montes, Zia Grace Bataan and Sharon Cuneta. It is an adaptation of the Japanese drama series Mother by Yuji Sakamoto, which explores the story of a mother's unconditional love while sharing the light of child abuse and domestic violence. The series streamed on Amazon Prime Video from November 28, 2024, to January 9, 2025, consisting of 14 episodes. The extended version of the series, titled Saving Grace: The Untold Story, premiered on March 3, 2025, on Kapamilya Channel's Primetime Bida evening block. It concluded on June 20, 2025, with 78 episodes.

== Premise ==
Anna Grace Sarmiento (Julia Montes) is an elementary school teacher who experienced struggles in life until she meets Mary Grace (Zia Grace Bataan), a positive student abused by her mother Sarah (Jennica Garcia) and stepfather, Chito (Christian Bables). Anna decides to kidnap Grace in order to save her.

== Cast and characters ==
Cast

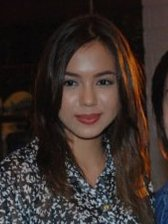
Julia Montes

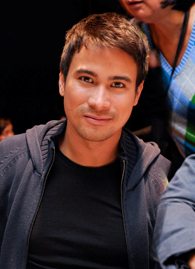
Sam Milby

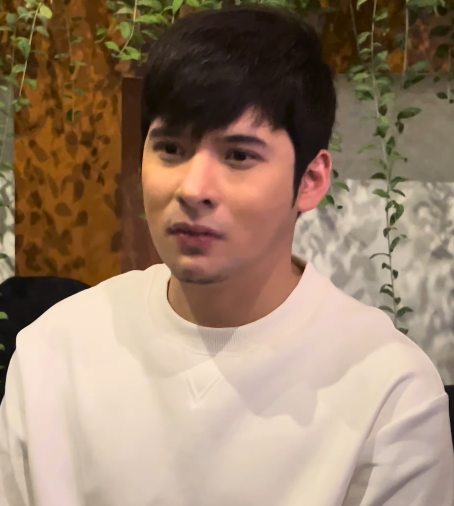
Christian Bables

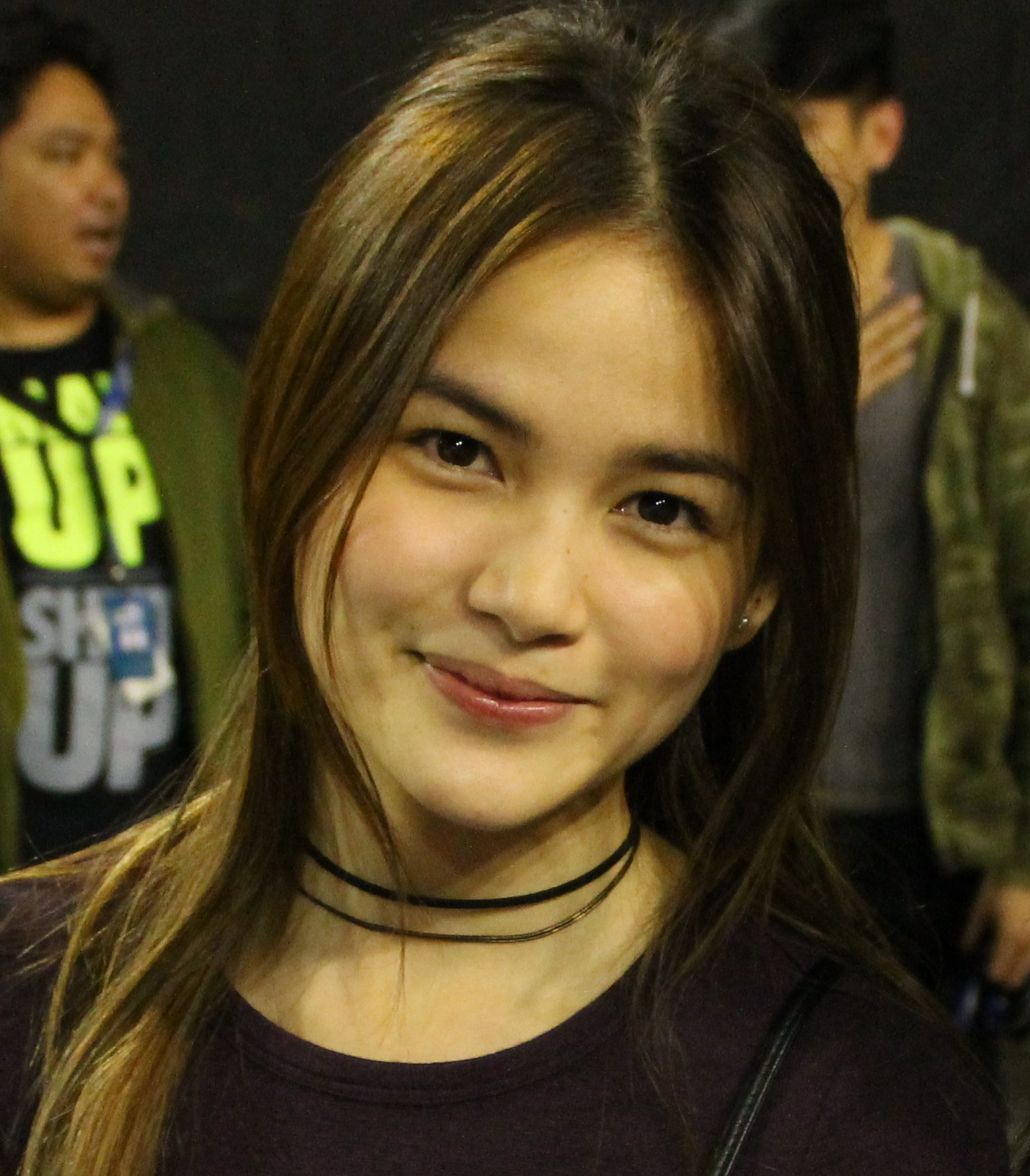
Elisse Joson

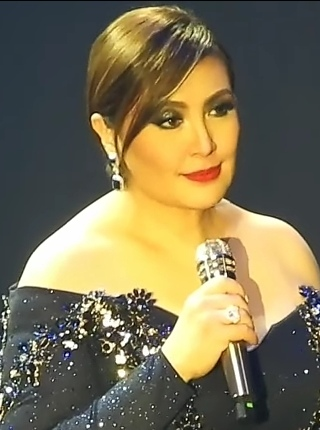
Sharon Cuneta

=== Main cast ===
- Julia Montes as Anna Grace Sarmiento / Grace Valdez: (Note: Anna is the biological daughter of Miranda & Antonio, having been conceived while Antonio was already married to Helena; however, it was later revealed that Antonio & Helena were not married at the time. Due to Helena's jealousy over Miranda & Antonio's romantic relationship, she ultimately keeps Miranda away from Antonio by lying about their marriage. Anna was first named Grace by the orphanage after the bracelet given to her by Miranda as a baby, before being adopted by Antonio & Helena.) A substitute elementary school teacher who discovered the suffering of her student Grace. Anna decides to "kidnap" Grace in order to save her. Meanwhile, she is low-contact with her family due to guilt after the loss of her father, but regulates the finances for her family's resort inn.
  - Hannah Vito as young Anna
- Zia Grace Bataan as Mary Grace Banaag / Bright Sarmiento: An elementary school student who is abused by her mother and her mother's live-in partner. Grace has a positive attitude and tries to be a better person. She disguises herself as Anna's son named Bright, named after the brand of her favorite red hot dogs.
- Sharon Cuneta as Miranda Gracia Valdez: A former NTV reporter serving as the host of the network's TV show Karamay, and Jessica's mother. She takes an interest in covering Grace and Sarah's story for her program. Miranda also yearns for her first daughter that she had given up for adoption after birth, in order to proceed with her career plans.
  - Michelle Vito as young Miranda
- Janice de Belen as Helena Sarmiento: Anna, Princess, and Erin's mother. After learning that Anna is her late husband Antonio's daughter from a previous relationship, Helena briefly pushed Anna away following the death of Antonio. In order to save their family's home, Anna proposed the idea to turn their residence into a resort inn, named Helena's Paradise.
  - Inah Estrada as young Helena
- Sam Milby as Julius Hernandez: An NTV producer of Karamay, and Jessica's boyfriend. He proposed for Grace and Sarah's story to be featured on Miranda's program. Julius is also revealed to be Anna's ex-boyfriend, and the illegitimate son of Gov. Edgardo Hernandez.
- Jennica Garcia as Sarah Banaag: Grace's selfish mother and Chito's romantic partner. Sarah's love for Chito soon takes precedence over her role as Grace's mother, ultimately driving her daughter away following her share of abuse towards the child.
- Christian Bables as Chito Sumulong: Grace's abusive father-figure and Sarah's romantic partner. He is abusive towards Grace despite Sarah's efforts to appease him.
- Eric Fructuoso as Oscar Jimenez: A police officer who investigates Grace's disappearance, determined to find evidence of the child having been abused at home.
- Elisse Joson as Atty. Jessica Valdez: A lawyer and Miranda's second daughter. Despite the clashes between Miranda and Julius, Jessica is often sympathetic towards her mother due to her hardships as a single parent.

=== Recurring cast ===
- Sophia Reola as Erin Sarmiento: Anna and Princess' younger sister who still gets traumatized from the memories about her father's death. She was the one who revealed the truth about Helena's lie.
  - Misha Kobayashi as young Erin
- Adrian Lindayag as Charlie Molina: Anna, Princess, and Erin's cousin.
- Alma Concepcion as Monika Hernandez: Edgardo's wife.
- Ramon Christopher as Gov. Edgardo Hernandez: Julius' father.
- Mary Joy Apostol as Princess Sarmiento: Anna's younger sister and Erin's older sister who was always jealous and blamed and hated Anna for their father's death.
  - Myel de Leon as young Princess
- Aya Fernandez as Ashley Santillan: An employee at NTV who seeks to ruin Miranda's reputation.
- Karl Gabriel as Matty Cabreras: An employee at Helena's Paradise.
- Andrez del Rosario as Vincent Jimenez: Oscar's son and Erin's friend.
- Emilio Daez as Wilson Hernandez: Princess' fiancé and Julius' cousin.
- PJ Endrinal as Tommy Vasquez: An assistant producer at NTV and Jessica's friend.
- Fe de los Reyes as Carmen Flores: Miranda's manager & best friend.
  - Gail Banawis as young Carmen
- Jong Cuenco as Ramon Damiles: A high-ranking police officer and Chito's family friend, frequently keeping the latter out of prison.
- Daisy Cariño as Mildred "Mely" Bugayong: Grace and Sarah's neighbor.
- Lotlot Bustamante as Patty Capili: An elementary school teacher who, together with Anna, helped report Grace's situation to social services.

=== Guest cast ===
- Gardo Versoza as Antonio Sarmiento: Helena's late husband, and Anna, Princess, & Erin's father. He located the orphanage where Anna was taken to as a baby, and convinced Helena to adopt her into their family due to the latter's fertility issues at the time. Antonio's demise occurred after an argument with Helena when he reveals to her the truth of Anna's identity.
  - Jeremiah Lisbo as young Antonio
- Joel Saracho as a fisherman who witnessed Grace running at the pier in the rain during the night she was declared missing.
- Sherry Lara as Lucia Calinao: The owner of the old orphanage where she took care of many children, including young Anna. She lets Anna and Grace stay without realizing their true identities, until an argument with her son Bobby over the demolition of the old orphanage.
- Junjun Quintana as Bobby Calinao: Lucia's son who had a rift with his mother for years over the demolition plan of the orphanage until they later reconciled thanks to Grace. They live together at his home.
- Franco Laurel as Wilson's father
- Nor Domingo as Mr. Valdez: Miranda's father who coerced her into giving up her baby for adoption due to their family's poor situation, including the illness of his wife.
- Dwin Araza as Mr. Santos: Foster Dad of Grace
- Kai Montinola as teen Grace
- Malou Crisologo as Sally: The head of the orphanage where Grace was taken during Anna's trial against Sarah.

== Episodes ==
No.	Title	Original release date
1	"Episode 1"	November 28, 2024
Two weeks before Grace “disappeared”, during the Bagong Buhay Elementary School's Teacher’s Day event, Grace came in late without her costume and performing with her group, then suddenly, Grace’s teacher, Thelma, was taken to the hospital. After the school session ended, Anna was planning to move to Hong Kong instead of reuniting with her family as she had a difficult life since her father died. Anna became a substitute teacher for Thelma, but Grace was being bullied when she arrived. After school, Grace came back home cleaning while experiencing life-struggles with her mother, Sarah, and her stepfather, Chito. Later that night, Grace met Anna for a conversation. The other morning, Anna discovered abuse marks on Grace’s back leading to a report to her parents, but Sarah denied it. One day, Grace was looking for her pet, but Chito killed it, angering her. However, a drunk Sarah abused her. The next day, Chito hid her some place to avoid suspicions, but Anna discovered it and took Grace to her house without notice. Grace was in emotional pain from the abuse and told Anna what had happened. However, they waved an emotional goodbye as she was supposed to head to the airport.
2	"Episode 2"	November 28, 2024
Anna quietly took Grace to safety avoiding suspicions, and some fishermen and the police discovered Grace’s stuff, leading to an investigation. The next day, after Miranda did another episode for her talk show for NTV, her manager informed her that the show’s ratings had gone down and advised her to find a solution. While Grace’s abusive parents were still looking for her, they got into a fight over what they’d done. Julius, an NTV producer, was looking for the story about the “disappearance” of Grace. Chito got into a fight with him and was charged by the police. Later, Miranda arrived at Grace’s home and interviewed Sarah, who denied the abuse to her daughter and talked about her relationship. Meanwhile, Anna seeks a place to stay while disguising Grace as a boy named Bright. Grace was supposed to meet her aunt, who was a relative of her father, at her house in Quezon, but she died years ago. At Grace's house during nighttime, Chito convinces Sarah to avoid actual publicity after she bails him out of jail. When Sarah's interview aired on TV the next morning, Anna and Grace decided in an emotional agreement that she would kidnap her.
3	"Episode 3"	December 5, 2024
While Julius searches for clues about Anna and Grace's whereabouts, Anna and Grace visit the old orphanage in Batangas, where Anna used to live after being abandoned by her mother. Chito recognizes Grace from a bus yesterday, and Sarah starts to believe him as they search for clues. Helena visits Anna's apartment in Manila to gather information and unexpectedly meets Julius. Later, Lucia at the old orphanage allows Anna and Bright (Grace's disguise) to stay until Anna finds a police report and decides to create a false alibi after she arrives at the police station, accusing Chito and Sarah of abuse. Julius confronts Anna about her lies. Meanwhile, Bright attempts to steal a car key from his mother, Bobby, who is trying to sell the old orphanage and move her to a nursing home. Bobby and Lucia have an emotional talk the next day, and decided to stay together at his house. Later at night, Lucia told Anna she found out about true identity of Bright and gave her the old bracelet. The next day, Anna plans to take Grace to some place else after she supposed to leave her at the other orphanage, accidentally calls her mother, Sarah.
4	"Episode 4"	December 5, 2024
The unexpected call received by Sarah leads the police to find Lucia's orphanage in Batangas. Meanwhile, Miranda's visit to the orphanage reminds of her hidden past. While searching, Sarah catches a glimpse of Grace, whom chooses to run away from her. Sarah is bewildered of her daughter's action, rationalizing that she must be running away from the kidnappers, while Chito reminds her that she might have chose to become a runaway due to her maltreatment. Pressure arises for police officer Oscar to find Grace and solve the case. On the other hand, disagreement arises between Jessica and Julius, as he decides to follow Anna in Palawan. With no other option, Anna along with Grace run away to Palawan, her hometown. Despite Anna's efforts to keep Grace a secret from her family, her sister Princess catches Anna with a child.
5	"Episode 5"	December 12, 2024
To protect Grace, Anna is forced to pretend that the former is her child and divert the police investigation away from her. However, Julius relentlessly asks questions who the child's father is, while Helena starts to doubt her supposed granddaughter's identity. Soon, a heated confrontation compels Anna to reveal her long-buried secrets.
6	"Episode 6"	December 12, 2024
7	"Episode 7"	December 19, 2024
8	"Episode 8"	December 19, 2024
9	"Episode 9"	December 26, 2024
10	"Episode 10"	December 26, 2024
11	"Episode 11"	January 2, 2025
12	"Episode 12"	January 2, 2025
13	"Episode 13"	January 9, 2025
14	"Episode 14"	January 9, 2025

== Production ==
=== Development ===
The project was first revealed on July 15, 2024, after ABS-CBN Studios inked a deal with Nippon TV to do a Philippine adaptation of a Japanese drama. Chief operating officer of ABS-CBN Corporation and executive producer of ABS-CBN Studios, Cory Vidanes stated:

"This is the [Filipino] adaptation of Mother that is created and produced by Nippon TV. This is our very first adaptation of a Nippon TV series, and we are very grateful to Nippon TV for entrusting us with the rights for the Filipino version. It's a beautiful story that really centers around the importance of family and motherhood and promises to be a very emotionally engaging and heartwarming series that will deeply resonate with the Filipino audience and the non-Filipino audiences worldwide."

Content business representatives of Nippon TV, Sally Yamamoto and Yuki Akehi, expressed satisfaction with the partnership with ABS-CBN stating:

"As we celebrate our landmark tenth international deal for Mother, we are delighted to be announcing this adaptation with ABS-CBN. We truly believe in ABS-CBN’s production capabilities and that the Filipino audience will love this show. Mother is truly a beautiful story, and we are confident that the Filipino audience are going to love it. Best wishes to the cast and crew."

The tenth adaptation of Mother, the series is one of the final projects that the then-head of Dreamscape Entertainment, Roldeo Endrinal, was involved in before his death on February 3, 2024. FM Reyes and Dolly Dulu served as directors.

=== Casting ===
On July 15, 2024, Julia Montes was announced for the lead role. During the same week, Janice de Belen, Sam Milby, Jennica Garcia, Christian Bables, and Sharon Cuneta were cast in main roles. Zia Grace Bataan was announced in the title role, marking her debut as a child actress. Elisse Joson, Aya Fernandez, Adrian Lindayag, Mary Joy Apostol, Sophia Reola, Eric Fructuoso, Andrez del Rosario, and Fe de los Reyes were also announced as part of the cast.

=== Filming ===
Principal photography commenced in July 2024. Filming took place in Puerto Princesa, Palawan. It was concluded in October 2024.

== Release ==
=== Streaming ===
The series premiered on November 28, 2024, with two episodes released per week on Amazon Prime Video. The series consists of 14 episodes. The teleserye version was released on Kapamilya Online Live and iWantTFC (now iWant) on March 3, 2025.

=== Television broadcast ===
Saving Grace made its television debut (subtitled as "The Untold Story"), which is the uncut and extended version of the series, on March 3, 2025, on Kapamilya Channel, A2Z, TV5, and worldwide via The Filipino Channel.

== Marketing ==
Advanced screening for the series was held on November 22, 2024, at Gateway Mall 2 in Quezon City.

== Reception ==
Upon release, Saving Grace debuted at number-one on Amazon Prime Video in the Philippines. The series ranked third on Trendrod's list of the top 40 best Philippine shows of 2024.

=== Accolades ===
Award	Date of ceremony	Category	Recipients(s)	Result	Ref(s).
ContentAsia Awards	September 4, 2025	Best TV Format Adaptation (Scripted) in Asia	Saving Grace: The Untold Story	Bronze	
ContentAsia Awards	September 4, 2025	Best Supporting Actress in a TV Programme/Series Made in Asia	Zia Grace Bataan	Gold	
Global OTT Awards	August 24, 2025	Best Asian Contents	Saving Grace	Nominated	
Asian Academy Creative Awards	September 30, 2025	Best Adaptation Of An Existing Format (Scripted)	Saving Grace	Won	
Seoul International Drama Awards	October 2, 2025	Best Screenwriter	Danica Domingo	Nominated	
Seoul International Drama Awards	October 2, 2025	Best Series	Saving Grace	Nominated	
Gawad Pasado Awards	October 25, 2025	PinkaPASADOng Batang Aktres sa Telebisyon	Zia Grace	Won	
KBP Golden Dove Awards	September 30, 2026	Best Actress	Julia Montes	Won	
