= Eylül =

Eylül is a Turkish feminine given name meaning September. Notable people with the name include:

- Eylül Akarçeşme (born 1999), Turkish volleyball player
- Eylül Aslan, Turkish photography artist
- Eylül Cansın (1992–2015), transgender Turkish woman whose death by suicide prompted protests and calls for international LGBT equality in society
- Eylül Elgalp (born 1991), Turkish footballer
