= Buğra Gülsoy =

Turkish actor

- Born: Behiç Buğra Gülsoy; 22 February 1982 (age 44); Ankara, Turkey
- Education: Eastern Mediterranean University
- Occupation: Actor
- Years active: 2004–present
- Spouse(s): Burcu Kara (m. 2011; div. 2012) Nilüfer Gürbüz (m. 2018; div. 2023)
- Children: 1

Behiç Buğra Gülsoy (born 22 February 1982) is a Turkish actor, author, screenwriter, director, producer, architect, graphic designer and photographer.

== Early life ==
Buğra Gülsoy was born on 22 February 1982 in Ankara, Turkey. His mother is from Erzincan. His father is from Niğde. He completed his primary, secondary and high school education in Ankara. He gained his first stage experience when he was 13. He graduated from the Eastern Mediterranean University, Faculty of Architecture and master of advanced acting in Bahçeşehir University.

== Career ==
The movies in which he has had a role include Cebimdeki Yabancı, Acı Tatlı Ekşi, Mahalle, Görümce, Robinson Crusoe, Güzel Günler Göreceğiz, Gölgeler ve Suretler, and Güneşi Gördüm. One of his movies also include Yaren Leylek where he had a leading role with Seçkin Özdemir and Hande Doğandemir.

He came to attention for series "Unutulmaz" in 2009. In 2010, Gülsoy played the role of Vural Namlı in the internationally famous series Fatmagül'ün Suçu Ne?. Since 2011, he has portrayed Güney Tekinoğlu in the Kanal D drama series Kuzey Güney and was awarded "The best TV series actor" in 2012. He played the main role in the series Eski Hikaye as Mete. In 2015, he played the lead role in the popular romantic-comedy series Aşk Yeniden as Fatih. In 2018 he played in Kızım as Demir Göktürk. In 2020, He played as Sultan Melikşah of Seljuk Empire in historical series Uyanış: Büyük Selçuklu.

== Personal life ==
Gülsoy dated actress Burcu Kara, they married on 22 July 2011. The pair lasted only 12 months and divorced in 2012. He married Nilüfer Gürbüz in September 2018, with whom he has a son named Cem Gülsoy, born in April 2019. They divorced in March 2023.

== Books ==
- Birinci Kıyamet
- İkinci Kıyamet
- Luna

== Theatre ==
- Pragma
- Deep
- Caesar Bir Denge Oyunu
- Kadıncıklar
- Lokomopüf

== Filmography ==
=== Web series ===
Year	Title	Role	Notes
2022	Dünyayla Benim Aramda	Tolga	Leading role

=== TV series ===
Year	Title	Role	Notes
2008	Hepimiz Birimiz İçin	Nazım	Supporting role
2009–2010	Unutulmaz	Tolga	Supporting role
2010–2011	Fatmagül'ün Suçu Ne?	Vural Namlı	Supporting role
2011–2013	Kuzey Güney	Güney Tekinoğlu	Leading role
2013–2014	Eski Hikaye	Mete	Leading role
2014	Bana Artık Hicran De	Sinan	Leading role
2015–2016	Aşk Yeniden	Fatih Şekercizade	Leading role
2018	8. Gün	Ozan Taş	Leading role
2018–2019	Kızım	Demir Göktürk	Leading role
2019	Azize	Kartal Alpan	Leading role
2020–2021	Uyanış: Büyük Selçuklu	Sultan Melikşah	Leading role
2021	Misafir	Erdem Ersoy	Leading role
2024–2025	Bahar	Evren Yalkın	Leading role
2026	Tuzlu Kahve	Mehmet Aydınoğlu	Leading role

=== Films ===
Year	Title	Role	Notes
2004	Trio		Short film
2005	Heterotopya		Short film – Director and actor
2006	İnsan Üçleme		Short film – Director and actor
2007	Alt Üst		Short film – Director and actor
2007	Nar Yarası		Short film
2007	Mutlu Son	Arda	Short film – Director and actor
2009	Güneşi Gördüm	Berat	
2010	Gölgeler ve Suretler	Ahmet	
2011	Güzel Günler Göreceğiz	Cumali	
2016	Görümce	Ahmet	leading role
2016	Robinson Crouse	Robinson	Dubbing voice
2016	Mahalle	Sabri	Writer – director – leading role
2017	Acı Tatlı Ekşi	Murat	Writer – leading role
2018	Cebimdeki Yabancı	Kerem	Leading role
2024	Yaren Leylek	Hakan	Leading role
2024	Gecenin Nakaratı	Bora	Leading role

=== Producer and director ===
- Mahalle
- Pragma
- Sharzin Rabbani

=== Screenwriter ===
- Acı Tatlı Ekşi
- Mutluluk Zamanı
- Mahalle
- Pragma (theatre)

=== Commercial ===
- Fuse Tea
- Filli Boya
- Vodafone
