= Gohar-A'in =

11th-century Turkic eunuch Mamluk, government official, diplomat, and military commander

Sa'd ad-Dawla Gohar-Āin
- Born: unknown
- Died: c. 1100; Baghdad
- Military career
- Allegiance: Seljuks and Abbasids
- Rank: Commander
- Conflicts: Battle of Manzikert, Campaigns against the Marwanids

Sa'd ad-Dawla Gohar-Ā'īn (died 1100) was an 11th-century Turkic eunuch mamluk who served as a government official, diplomat, and military commander for the Seljuk Empire. The name "Gohar-Ā'īn" means "jewel-mirror". Medieval authors had differing opinions about him – Ibn al-Jawzi spoke highly of him, praising "his capability, clear view, and leadership of the army" as well as his "piousness, uprightness and justice". Ibn al-Athir also had a positive opinion of him, saying he "did not take anything for himself from the people of his wilaya". Bundari, on the other hand, spoke negatively of him, calling him "cunning like a dog, something like a beast, a man without penis, a woman without vagina".

== Life ==
Early in life, Gohar-A'in was a mamluk under the Buyid amir Abu Kalijar, who he accompanied to Baghdad in 1044. Later he was in the service of Abu Kalijar's son Malik ar-Rahim when he was imprisoned at Tabarik near Rayy by the Seljuk sultan Tughril. After Malik ar-Rahim's death in 1058, Gohar-A'in ended up in the service of Alp Arslan.

Gohar-A'in was present at the Battle of Manzikert in August 1071. A mamluk under his command captured the Byzantine emperor Romanos IV Diogenes during the battle. In Muhammad ibn Ali Rawandi's account, when Alp Arslan was inspecting his troops before the battle, the inspectors had noticed this "very insignificant" mamluk and originally wanted to turn him away, but Gohar-A'in stopped this objection, saying that he may be destined to capture the emperor of Rum. Other historians record a similar series of events, changing the participants to make Nizam al-Mulk the one who initially dismissed the mamluk or Alp Arslan the one to object and insist on keeping him. According to Kosuke Shimizu, Gohar-A'in's overruling the army inspector indicates that he already held a high position before the battle. Shimizu also notes that, in the versions of the story featuring both Gohar-A'in and Nizam al-Mulk, Nizam al-Mulk's contemptuous attitude toward Gohar-A'in may indicate that there was already animosity between the two – something that would become more apparent later.

In December 1071 or January 1072, Alp Arslan appointed Gohar-A'in shahna, or military governor, of Baghdad - a position he would hold on-and-off for the rest of his life. Alp Arslan's original selection for the post, in December, had been Ay Tekin al-Sulaymani, but the Abbasid caliph al-Qa'im objected because one of Ay Tekin's sons had killed one of al-Qa'im's mamluks. Gohar-A'in was appointed instead, and he arrived in Baghdad in January.

According to Rawandi's account, Gohar-A'in was present when Alp Arslan was assassinated in November 1072. He tried to stop the assassin by shielding Alp Arslan with his own body and was wounded in the process, but he was unable to prevent the assassination from happening.

After Alp Arslan's death, a civil war broke out between his son Malik-Shah I and his brother Qavurt. Qavurt was defeated and taken captive before Malik-Shah, who ordered Gohar-A'in to execute Qavurt. Gohar-A'in in turn had his subordinates do the actual execution on his behalf.

Malik-Shah held Gohar-A'in in high esteem, and as shahna of Baghdad he was led the Seljuk delegation before al-Qa'im to get his formal recognition of Malik-Shah's sultanate. This happened in October 1073. Later, Gohar-A'in led the Seljuk negotiations for Malik-Shah's request to marry the daughter of al-Muqtadi, who had succeeded al-Qa'im as caliph.

In 1078, Nizam al-Mulk reappointed Gohar-A'in as shahna of Baghdad – apparently the position had passed to someone else by then – and sent him to Baghdad to have the Abbasid caliph's vizier, Fakhr ad-Dawla ibn Jahir, removed from office. Deadly riots had broken out in Baghdad the year before, and Nizam al-Mulk's son Mu'ayyad al-Mulk had been put in danger. Nizam al-Mulk blamed the affair on Fakhr ad-Dawla. Gohar-A'in arrived on 23 July and was granted an audience on Tuesday, 14 August, during which he handed over a letter requesting Fakhr ad-Dawla's removal. Al-Muqtadi initially balked at the demand, but by 27 August Gohar-A'in was threatening to attack the palace unless he complied. Faced with the threat of violence, al-Muqtadi had no choice but to accede to Nizam al-Mulk's demand.

In the meantime, Gohar-A'in's conduct had apparently been scaring some of the citizens of Baghdad – he was having drums played during prayer hours every day, and shouting "there is no choice except to hand me the wazir. I will not allow the delay." At one point he apparently entered the Qasr al-Firdaws palace while drunk, shut the gate, and stayed there for a night and a day. Gohar-A'in had apparently requested the right to have ceremonial drums played during prayer hours at some point, but this had been rejected because it was not customary. When he had it done anyway, he was censured; he replied that he had a warrant from the sultan that allowed him to do so. Gohar-A'in also ignored Ibn Jahir and insisted on delivering the letter directly to the caliph himself, which was considered an insult to the vizier's dignity. All these antics also served as a power play to assert Seljuk dominance over the Abbasid caliph.

In January 1080, Gohar-A'in and Khumar Tekin al-Sharabi accompanied Malik-Shah to Khuzistan to go hunting. According to Ibn al-Athir, the two were plotting to kill Ibn Allan, the Jewish tax farmer of Basra, because he was under Nizam al-Mulk's protection and they were both enemies of Nizam al-Mulk. According to the Muntazam of Ibn al-Jawzi, the two emirs Gohar-A'in and Khumar Tekin had been trying to cause a rift between Malik-Shah and Nizam al-Mulk. Malik-Shah was also apparently concerned that Ibn Allan's wealth and power would increase. He had Ibn Allan arrested and ordered him to be executed by drowning, which was carried out by one of Gohar-A'in's subordinates. Malik-Shah agreed to give Khumar Tekin the tax farm of Basra in return for an annual tribute of 100,000 dinars and 100 horses; he also confiscated an additional 100,000 dinars from Ibn Allan's fortune for himself. Nizam al-Mulk was furious and would not appear in public for three days. He later confronted Malik-Shah at a feast he was holding in Malik-Shah's honor, but Malik-Shah made excuses and the matter was apparently dropped.

In the following years, Gohar-A'in took part in several major military campaigns, separated by periods of dealing with public unrest in Baghdad. First, in September 1085, he accompanied Fakhr ad-Dawla ibn Jahir – who was now working for the Seljuks – in his campaign against the Marwanids of Mayyafariqin. Also joining Ibn Jahir's campaign were the Seljuk emirs Qara Tekin and Anush Tekin. After this campaign ended successfully, Gohar-A'in returned to Baghdad – presumably he was still the shahna there. Five riots broke out in Baghdad during the early months of 1086, but while sources do mention a shahna playing a part in quelling them, they don't mention him by name so it's unclear if this was Gohar-A'in or someone else. Later in April or May 1087 he (and Bursuq) brought baggage for the wedding between the Abbasid caliph al-Muqtadi and the daughter of Malik-Shah in Baghdad.

In December 1087, Gohar-A'in took part in a second major campaign, this time against Mu'adhdhib ad-Dawla Ahmad, the Arab ruler of the Bata'ih in southern Iraq. During his absence from Baghdad, there was a marked increase in civil unrest. Another riot broke out in February 1088, between people from the Karkh and Basra Gate quarters of Baghdad, and this time sources do explicitly name Gohar-A'in as the one who suppressed it. He also played a role in keeping order during further unrest in April/May 1088. Yet another riot broke out in July/August 1089, and most of the Dajjaj Canal quarter was looted and burned. Khumar Tekin, who was Gohar-A'in's na'ib or deputy, was the one who handled this incident.

In 1089, Malik Shah sent a letter to al-Muqtadi to request that his daughter come home; she was apparently feeling alienated in Baghdad. Gohar-A'in accompanied her on her way home along with some of the caliph's attendants. According to Shimizu, this indicates that "Gohar-A'in's main duty was still keeping diplomatic relations between the sultan and the caliph." Later, in 1090, he went to Basra along with the Banu Mazyad ruler Sayf ad-Dawla Sadaqa to help repel an attack by the Qarmatians.

In April/May 1091, Gohar-A'in played a role in removing the Abbasid vizier Abu Shuja al-Rudhrawari from office. When an agent (wakil) of Malik-Shah and Nizam al-Mulk, Abu Sa'd ibn Samaha, was mugged in Baghdad, Gohar-A'in wrote to the Seljuk court complaining about the affair and saying that the caliph's vizier should be responsible for upholding public morals. This resulted in an envoy being sent to al-Muqtadi, who had al-Rudhrawari dismissed. Later, Gohar-A'in took part in a campaign in Hejaz and Yemen led by the Turkman amir Chabaq.

After Malik-Shah's death, Gohar-A'in behaved opportunistically. He originally supported Tutush to succeed Malik-Shah and had the khutbah proclaimed in his name in Baghdad, but when Tutush had to return to Syria in 1093, Gohar-A'in was placed in "a difficult situation". He went to Barkiyaruq and apologized; the emirs Bursuq and Gumush Tekin al-Jandar sided with him. Barkiyaruq excused him and re-appointed him as shahna of Baghdad, but he did confiscate Gohar-A'in's iqta'. However, within the same year, he gave Gohar-A'in the iqta of the executed amir Yalbad, and he increased his salary at the same time. (As a side note about Gohar-A'in's iqtas, he had been given Wasit as iqta by Alp Arslan, and he had also received Takrit from Terken Khatun, but Takrit had gone to Gumush Tekin after Malik-Shah's death and Gohar-A'in never held Takrit again.)

Shortly after Gohar-A'in was appointed by Barkiyaruq, a riot broke out in the Nasriya quarter of Baghdad in July 1093, which he suppressed. He had the khutbah recited in Barkiyaruq's name in February 1094; Tutush had appointed his own shahna of Baghdad and attempted to get the caliph to say the khutbah in his own name but failed.

Gohar-A'in later sided with Muhammad I Tapar against Barkiyaruq for a while, but later he switched sides again and went back to supporting Barkiyaruq. The two sides eventually met in battle at Sefid Rud near Hamadan in May 1100. In this battle, Gohar-A'in commanded Barkiyaruq's right flank, along with Izz ad-Dawla ibn Sadaqa, while Kerbogha commanded the left flank and Barkiyaruq himself commanded the center. Gohar-A'in's troops did well in this battle and routed Muhammad Tapar's left flank (commanded by Mu'ayyad al-Mulk), but Barkiyaruq's left flank under Kerbogha collapsed and Gohar-A'in had to retreat. As he was retreating, his horse stumbled and he fell to the ground, where a Khorasani soldier from the other side killed and beheaded him. (According to Ibn al-Jawzi, Gohar-A'in was instead killed because he fell on his own weapon.) Gohar-A'in's death made Barkiyaruq's troops break completely and they fled.

After his death, Gohar-A'in's body was brought to Baghdad and buried on the east side of the city, across from the Ribat of Abu Manjib.
