= Banu Jahir =

The Banū Jahīr (lit. 'the sons of Jahir'), were a family that produced several high-ranking government officials who at various times served both the Abbasids and the Seljuks. Most notably, they dominated the Abbasid vizierate for almost 50 years during the second half of the 11th century and then in the early years of the 12th century. They were also known as the Āl Jahīr, or "the people of Jahir".

== History ==
The first member of the Banu Jahir to gain prominence was Fakhr al-Dawla, who was born in Mosul in 1007 into a rich merchant family. He had the most varied political career of his family, serving five different ruling dynasties during his long career. He originally went into service for the Uqaylid dynasty that ruled Mosul at the time before leaving after the death of Qirwash ibn al-Muqallad in 1049. He went to Aleppo, where he at one point became vizier for the Mirdasid emir Mu'izz al-Dawla Thimal, before eventually joining the court of the Marwanids in Mayyafariqin. In 1062, Fakhr al-Dawla was appointed vizier to the Abbasid caliph al-Qa'im (replacing the incompetent Ibn Darust), after a short period of swaying him with gifts and money; the administrative ability he had displayed at Mayyafariqin also must have helped his case.

Fakhr al-Dawla's first term as vizier lasted until his dismissal in 1067 as punishment for acting above his station. However, he was reinstated after only four months. At this point, Fakhr al-Dawla's son Amid al-Dawla also began to play an important role in government and also married the daughter of the powerful Seljuk vizier Nizam al-Mulk. The Banu Jahir oversaw the official mourning after the death of the Seljuk sultan Alp Arslan in 1072, as well as the ceremonial exchange of oaths of loyalty and robes of honor between the caliph and the new sultan Malik-Shah I. When al-Qa'im was on his deathbed, he urged his grandson and successor al-Muqtadi to keep the father-and-son team in their official positions, saying that he knew of no better candidates for the job. Al-Muqtadi followed his grandfather's advice, and the Banu Jahir kept their positions.

In 1077, deadly riots broke out in Baghdad between the city's Hanbali and Ash'ari factions when Abu Nasr ibn al-Ustadh Abi al-Qasim al-Qushayri arrived in town to become lecturer at the city's nizamiyya. During the riots, Nizam al-Mulk's son Mu'ayyad al-Mulk's life was endangered. Nizam al-Mulk blamed Fakhr al-Dawla for the whole affair and, in 1078 sent his representative Gohar-A'in to the caliph to demand Fakhr al-Dawla's removal. Al-Muqtadi initially balked at the demand, but after Gohar-A'in threatened to use force, he was forced to comply – the Abbasids lacked a military of their own and were powerless to resist Seljuk interference.

Amid al-Dawla reacted to this by going to Isfahan to meet with Nizam al-Mulk himself – taking a circuitous route to avoid Gohar-A'in – and plead his father's case. His efforts were successful: in 1079 the two parties were formally reconciled and the caliph rehired the Banu Jahir. They sealed the agreement by arranging a marriage between Amid ad-Dawla and a granddaughter of Nizam al-Mulk – Amid ad-Dawla's previous wife, who was Nizam al-Mulk's daughter, had died in childbirth in 1077. This ended up strengthening the ties between the two vizieral families.

A few years later, in 1081, the caliph sent Fakhr al-Dawla to Isfahan to negotiate marriage with Malik-Shah's daughter. Eventually, he had to go to her foster mother, Turkan Khatun, who was disinterested at first because the Ghaznavid ruler had made a better offer. The two parties negotiated and finally reached an agreement, in which Turkan Khatun imposed heavy conditions on the Abbasid caliph: in return for marrying the Seljuk princess, al-Muqtadi would pay 50,000 gold dinars plus an additional 100,000 dinars as mahr (bridal gift), give up his current wives and concubines, and agree to not have sexual relations with any other woman. By agreeing to these terms, Fakhr al-Dawla was putting al-Muqtadi at a severe disadvantage while also benefitting the Seljuks considerably.

By this point, it seems that the Banu Jahir were increasingly interested in working with the Seljuks. After al-Muqtadi fired them in 1083, they ended up directly joining the Seljuk administration. The circumstances of their removal from office are somewhat unclear – historians gave varying accounts. In Sibt ibn al-Jawzi's version, al-Muqtadi had become suspicious of the Banu Jahir, prompting them to leave for Khorasan without requesting official permission; this further aroused al-Muqtadi's suspicions and he retroactively fired them after they had left. He then wrote to the Seljuks, telling them specifically not to employ the Banu Jahir in their administration. In Ibn al-Athir's version, the Seljuks at some point approached al-Muqtadi and asked to employ the Banu Jahir themselves, and al-Muqtadi agreed. Al-Bundari offers no details about the firing itself but wrote instead that the Seljuks sent representatives to meet the Banu Jahir in Baghdad (rather than in Khorasan). Whatever the specific details may have been, al-Muqtadi went through a series of candidates to replace the Banu Jahir before finally settling on Abu Shuja al-Rudhrawari as his new vizier.

Now under Seljuk employ, Fakhr al-Dawla made arrangements with Malik-Shah to conquer the territories ruled by the Marwanids. He commanded some of Malik-Shah's troops during the campaign, which turned out to be more difficult than expected because of intervention from the Uqaylid ruler of Mosul, Muslim ibn Quraysh. Amid al-Dawla and his brother al-Kafi Za'im al-Ru'asa Abu'l-Qasim Ali both assisted their father during this campaign. There were sieges of Mayyafariqin, Amid, and other fortresses, and the campaign finally ended in success in 1085. According to Ibn al-Athir, Malik Shah gave Fakhr al-Dawla administrative control over the Diyar Bakr and granted him the right to have the khutbah (Friday sermon) proclaimed in his own name alongside Malik Shah's, as well as the right to mint coins with his name on them as well as Malik Shah's. However, Fakhr al-Dawla quickly became unpopular and was replaced by the end of the year. In 1089, Amid al-Dawla was granted tax farming rights over the Diyar Bakr; meanwhile, Fakhr ad-Dawla had been appointed governor of Mosul, his birthplace, where he died the next year in 1090.

The next year, Nizam al-Mulk convinced the Abbasid caliph al-Muqtadi to hire Amid al-Dawla as his vizier, replacing al-Rudhrawari once again. Amid al-Dawla left the Diyar Bakr under his brother al-Kafi's control. Al-Kafi later briefly served as vizier to Tutush when he took over Diyar Bakr after Malik Shah's death. Meanwhile, Amid al-Dawla would remain Abbasid vizier until 1099 or 1100, when he was removed from office and imprisoned by the Seljuk sultan Barkyaruq. There are different accounts for Amid al-Dawla's downfall – in one, Mu'ayyad al-Mulk, who had succeeded his father Nizam al-Mulk as Seljuk vizier, had offered the Abbasid vizierate to al-A'azz, and the two collaborated to remove him from office without input from Barkyaruq. In another, Barkyaruq himself fired Amid al-Dawla and fined him "an enormous sum" for misappropriating government funds before imprisoning him. In any case, Amid ad-Dawla died in prison shortly after, in 1100.

After Amid al-Dawla's downfall, his brother al-Kafi served as vizier to the Abbasid caliph al-Mustazhir from 1102/3 until 1106/7 and then again from 1108/9 until 1113/4. The last known prominent member of the Banu Jahir was Nizam al-Din Abu Nasr al-Muzaffar, who served as ustadhar and then vizier to the caliph from 1140/1 until 1146/7.
