= Akhbar al-dawla al-saljuqiyya =

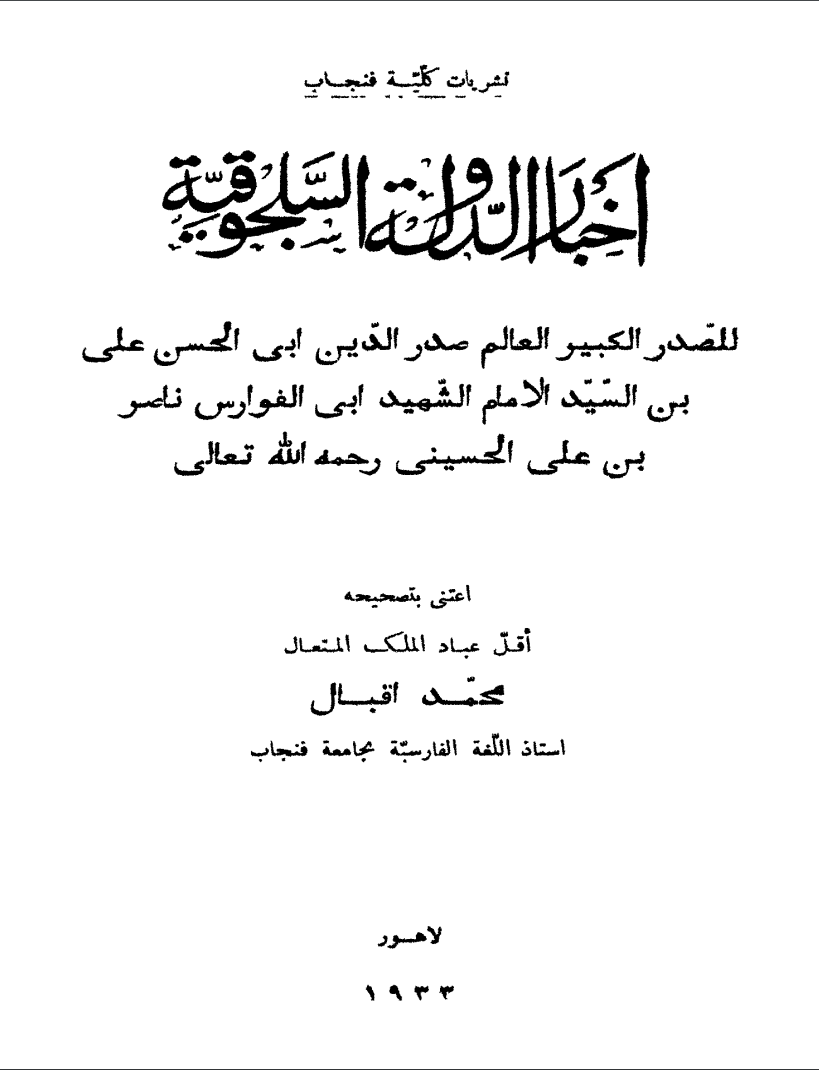
A book cover from a copy published in 1933

Akhbār al-dawla al-saljūqiyya is a chronicle which deals with the history of the Seljuks and the Eldiguzids. Probably written in c. 1262, it is the abridged and extant version of the original and non-extant Zubdat al-tawārīkh, which was written in Arabic by the 12th-century Iranian author Sadr al-Din Husayni.

== Content ==
The Akhbār al-dawla al-saljūqiyya consists of forty-one chapters, dealing with the history of the Seljuqs and their attendants, from the dynasty's origins in 10th-century Central Asia up to the death of Toghrul III, the last Sultan of the Seljuk Empire. Although for the period of 1092 to 1152 it mainly relies on Imad al-Din al-Isfahani's Nusrat al-fatra, which was originally written in 1183 and later abridged in 1226/7 by al-Bundari (died after 1241/2), the quality coverage of documentation for other phases make it an important source on the history of the Seljuks. The Akhbār al-dawla al-saljūqiyya relies on the non-extant Malik-nama for the period spanning from the origins of the Seljuqs until their victory over the Ghaznavids at the Battle of Dandanaqan in 1040. From the Battle of Dandanaqan until the death of Sultan Malik-Shah I in 1092, the Akhbār al-dawla al-saljūqiyya contains unique information not found elsewhere. Due to this significance, the work's passages about the Seljuq victory at the 1071 Battle of Manzikert over the Byzantines were already translated in 1887.

The work is considered a major source on the history of the Eldiguzids. The Akhbār al-dawla al-saljūqiyya speaks positively about the variety of Seljuq rulers, vassal rulers and caliphs. The text alternates between simple and sizeable quantities of rhymed prose and hyperbole. Although the work includes proverbes and verses, they appear at a much lower frequency than in the chronicles written by contemporary Iranian writers such as those of Imad al-Din al-Isfahani and Muhammad ibn Ali Rawandi.

The historian David Durand-Guédy mentions in the third edition of the Encyclopaedia of Islam that there are several theories about the identity of the writer of the abridged Akhbār al-dawla al-saljūqiyya. The thesis written by Karl Süssheim in 1911, which presented the idea that the work had been authored by the Ayyubid-era historian Ibn Zafir was refuted by Martijn Theodoor Houtsma (died 1943) and Claude Cahen (died 1991). Cahen himself presented the "imprecise and provisional conclusion" that the original work, which had been authored by Sadr al-Din Husayni, was expanded in c. 1203 by an "Iranian from the northwest", after which it was remodeled in its entirety by an unnamed third writer who added an abridged version of the aforementioned chronicle of Imad al-Din Isfahani comprising the years from 1092 to 1152. Durand-Guédy explains that other proposals are considered less convincing: the theory of Charles Pierre Henri Rieu (died 1902), later also adopted by Angelika Hartmann, held that the original work (i.e. the Zubdat al-tawārīkh) was written in Baghdad; whereas Qibla Ayaz is of the opinion that Sadr al-Din Husayni is the same person as Sayyid Sadr al-Din Nishapuri (as mentioned by Muhammad Aufi), who had been a civil servant in Nishapur for the Khwarazmians and the author of a non-extant history of the Khwarazmian ruler Muhammad II of Khwarazm (r. 1200-1220).

The Akhbār al-dawla al-saljūqiyya is known for being the least well understood chronicle on Seljuq history.

== Sources ==
- Durand-Guédy, David (2017). "al-Ḥusaynī, Ṣadr al-Dīn". In Fleet, Kate; Krämer, Gudrun; Matringe, Denis; Nawas, John; Rowson, Everett (eds.). Encyclopaedia of Islam (3rd ed.). Brill Online. ISSN 1873-9830.
