= Mukhtass al-Mulk =

Vizier of the Seljuq empire

Mukhtass al-Mulk Kashi was a Persian bureaucrat, who served as the vizier of the Seljuk sultan Ahmad Sanjar (r. 1118–1157) from 1124 to 1127.

According to the Saljuq-nama, Mukhtass al-Mulk was the nephew of a certain Abu Tahir Ismail Safi-yi, a prominent dabir (scribe) and calligrapher from Kashan, who was favoured with Sultan Malik-Shah I (r. 1072–1092) and the latter's vizier Nizam al-Mulk (died 1092). Abu Tahir Ismail Safi-yi was the kadkhuda (lieutenant) of Amir Qumaj, but was later murdered by a certain Turshak Sawabi, whom Mukhtass al-Mulk demanded retribution against. Mukhtass al-Mulk himself later entered into the service of Amir Qumaj, as he was appointed his deputy by Nizam al-Mulk. Under Muhammad I Tapar (r. 1105–1118), Mukhtass al-Mulk occupied various posts, such as tughra'i and mustawfi. While Ahmad Sanjar was campaigning in Iraq, Mukhtass al-Mulk impressed him, as a result was given the governorship of Ray, where he had a successful tenure. After Sanjar dismissed his vizier Muhammad ibn Sulayman Kashghari, he convinced Mukhtass al-Mulk to leave Iraq and serve him as his new vizier. Mukhtass al-Mulk is mentioned in three poems of the Persian court poet Mu'izzi (died 1125/7). Mukhtass al-Mulk was succeeded by Marwazi.

== Sources ==
- Tetley, Gillies (2008). The Ghaznavid and Seljuk Turks: Poetry as a Source for Iranian History. Routledge. ISBN 978-1-134-08438-8.

Preceded by Muhammad ibn Sulayman Kashghari	Vizier of the Seljuk Empire; 1124–1127	Succeeded by Marwazi
