= Fakhr ad-Dawla ibn Jahir =

11th-century government official, politician and Abbasid vizier

Fakhr ad-Dawla Abū Naṣr Muḥammad ibn Muḥammad ibn Jahīr

Abbasid Vizier
- In office December 1062 – 9 September 1068
- Monarch: al-Qa'im
- Preceded by: Ibn Darust
- Succeeded by: office vacant
- In office December 1068 – 27? August 1078
- Monarchs: al-Qa'im, al-Muqtadi
- Preceded by: office vacant
- Succeeded by: (?)
- In office c. 1079 – 1083
- Monarch: al-Muqtadi
- Preceded by: Abu Shuja al-Rudhrawari
- Succeeded by: Abu'l-Fath al-Muzaffar

Seljuk governor of Diyar Bakr
- In office 1085 – c. 1085

Personal details
- Born: 1007 Mosul
- Died: 1090 (aged 82–83) Mosul
- Children: Amid ad-Dawla (son); al-Kafi Za'im al-Ru'asa Abu'l-Qasim Ali (son)

Fakhr ad-Dawla Abū Naṣr Muḥammad ibn Muḥammad ibn Jahīr, also called Fakhr ad-Dawla, Ibn Jahir, or Fakhr ad-Dawla ibn Jahir, (1007–1090) was an 11th-century government official who served 5 different dynasties, most notably as vizier under the Abbasids and later as a provincial governor under the Seljuk Empire. He was the founder of the Banu Jahir political dynasty.

== Early life and career ==
Fakhr ad-Dawla was born in Mosul in 1007, into a rich merchant family. According to Ibn Khallikan, he was a descendant of the Banu Tha'labah. He originally went into service for the Uqaylid dynasty that ruled Mosul at the time before leaving after the death of Qirwash ibn al-Muqallad in 1049. He went to Aleppo, where he at one point became vizier for the Mirdasid emir Mu'izz ad-Dawla Thimal, before eventually joining the court of the Marwanids in Mayyafariqin (possibly around 1054). He was vizier for the Marwanid ruler Nasr ad-Dawla; then to his young successor Nizam ad-Din Nasr. He was working for Nizam ad-Din Nasr in 1062 when he was offered the position of vizier to the Abbasid caliph al-Qa'im in Baghdad.

== Working for the Abbasids ==
According to Ibn al-Athir and al-Bundari, Fakhr ad-Dawla sought out the position of Abbasid vizier himself. The sources say nothing about why he wanted the position. It may have been because of the prestige - for someone who had spent his career working for minor provincial dynasties, the prospect of working for the caliph in Baghdad may had a special allure. However, working as Abbasid vizier was not a low-risk job – his predecessor Ibn al-Muslima, who had technically only held the title of ra'is al-ru'asa' but who essentially acted as a vizier, had met a grisly death in 1058 during al-Basasiri's rebellion. Fakhr ad-Dawla must have been aware of the risks, as well as potential competition from the Seljuk administration under Tughril.

Whatever his motivation may have been, Fakhr ad-Dawla spent a short "courtship" period sending the caliph gifts and money to sway him. Then a caliphal envoy, al-Kamil Tirad az-Zaynabi, was sent in 1062 to Mayyafariqin to "surreptitiously" offer him the vizierate. Fakhr ad-Dawla accompanied the envoy on his journey back, "ostensibly to see him on his way"; when the Marwanid ruler realized he wasn't going to return, he sent officials to fetch him, but they were unable to get to him before he reached Baghdad. Fakhr ad-Dawla arrived and was "showered with gifts, robes of honor, and the title Fakhr ad-Dawla ('glory of the dynasty')." According to Sibt ibn al-Jawzi, he was also given the additional title Sharaf al-wuzarā'.

Fakhr ad-Dawla's first tenure lasted until 1068, when he was dismissed for a series of "infractions" (dhunūb) he had committed. The reasons included "his presence in the Bāb al-Hujra (Privy Chamber) without permission, and his wearing of 'Adud ad-Dawla's ceremonial robes." In other words, he had been acting above his station. According to the diary of Abu Ali ibn al-Banna, the dismissal was on Tuesday, 9 September 1068. Fakhr ad-Dawla was "despondent and apologetic" and "acquiesced in tears". He was escorted out of Baghdad on Thursday night (11 September) and ended up traveling to the court of the Banu Mazyad ruler Nur ad-Dawla Dubays. (Note: Sibt ibn al-Jawzi and Abu Ali ibn al-Banna say this was at al-Hillah, while Ibn al-Athir and al-Bundari say it was at Fallujah instead.) His belongings were later sent to him.

The competition to replace Fakhr ad-Dawla as vizier was fierce. Three different candidates were seriously considered, but none of them successfully took office as vizier. The caliph's initial choice was Abu Ya'la, father of Abu Shuja al-Rudhrawari, but he died on 11 September - before Fakhr ad-Dawla had even left Baghdad. Another early front-runner was the za'im Ibn Abd ar-Rahim, who was sent a letter to inform him of his selection to the vizierate before someone brought his sordid past to the caliph's attention: he had been part of al-Basasiri's entourage during his rebellion in 1058, and he had taken part in looting the caliph's palace and "attacking" the women of the harem. (Note: The sources don't specify if this was sexual violence or just plain violence.) His name was immediately removed from contention. At this point, around mid-late November, Ibn al-Banna wrote that a rumor had started to go around that al-Qa'im would reinstate Fakhr ad-Dawla as vizier. At some point, another candidate, a Hanbali named Abu'l-'Ala', was considered, but he never took office.

Meanwhile, Nur ad-Dawla Dubays had been making "entreaties to the caliph" on Fakhr ad-Dawla's behalf. Eventually, Fakhr ad-Dawla was brought back to serve as vizier. A group of administrative officials went out to meet with him on Sunday, 7 December, in advance of his return to Baghdad. Ibn al-Banna's diary gives the date of his reentry to Baghdad as Wednesday, 10 December 1068. Crowds came to watch and he was "met by the troops, the courtiers, and the leading figures". Vizieral robes of honor were made ready for him on 29 December, and they were bestowed upon him on Wednesday, 31 December. People went to congratulate him the next day. Then on Friday, 2 January 1069, he went on horseback to the Jami al-Mansur in the robes of honor; again, crowds gathered to see him, and in some places they "sprinkled" coins on him.

Al-Qa'im does not seem to have held a grudge against Fakhr ad-Dawla and entrusted him and his son Amid ad-Dawla with a wide range of duties. Sometime around 1071, there was a "diplomatic fracas" between Fakhr ad-Dawla and the Seljuk administration involving a delay in exchanging robes of honor. When Alp Arslan died in 1072, the Banu Jahir were tasked with overseeing the official mourning as well as the ceremonial exchange of loyalty and robes of honor between al-Qa'im and the new Seljuk sultan Malik-Shah I. On 26 September 1073, Fakhr ad-Dawla oversaw the signing of the controversial Hanbali scholar Ibn Aqil's public recantation of his beliefs at the caliphal chancery. This document of retraction is the only one of its kind to survive in full from the Middle Ages to the present day; the episode marked the ascendancy of traditionalism in Baghdad in the 11th century.

When al-Qa'im was on his deathbed in 1075, Fakhr ad-Dawla took charge of his personal care - al-Qa'im did not want bloodletting but Fakhr ad-Dawla had it done anyway. Before he died, al-Qa'im advised his grandson and successor al-Muqtadi to keep the Banu Jahir in their position: "I have not seen better persons for the dawla than Ibn Jahir and his son; do not turn away from them."

In 1077, deadly riots broke out in Baghdad between the city's Hanbali and Ash'ari factions when Abu Nasr ibn al-Ustadh Abi al-Qasim al-Qushayri arrived in town to become lecturer at the city's nizamiyya. During the riots, Nizam al-Mulk's son Mu'ayyad al-Mulk's life was endangered. Nizam al-Mulk blamed Fakhr ad-Dawla for the whole affair and in 1078 sent his representative Gohar-A'in to the caliph to demand Fakhr ad-Dawla's removal and to have the Banu Jahir's followers arrested. Gohar-A'in arrived on 23 July and was granted an audience on Tuesday, 14 August, during which he handed over a letter requesting Fakhr ad-Dawla's removal. Al-Muqtadi initially balked at the demand, but by 27 August Gohar-A'in was threatening to attack the palace unless he complied. At that point, al-Muqtadi had no choice – the Abbasids lacked a military of their own and were powerless to resist Seljuk interference. Fakhr ad-Dawla apparently resigned (instead of being fired) and al-Muqtadi had him placed under house arrest.

Meanwhile, Amid ad-Dawla had left for Isfahan once he heard of Nizam al-Mulk's plans. He took a circuitous route through the mountains to avoid running into Gohar-A'in on the way, and he reached Isfahan on 23 July – the same day that Gohar A'in reached Baghdad. Amid ad-Dawla met with Nizam al-Mulk and the two parties eventually reconciled, which they sealed with a marriage contract between Nizam al-Mulk's granddaughter and Amid ad-Dawla. Al-Muqtadi did not initially rehire the Banu Jahir and instead kept them under house arrest, but Nizam al-Mulk later intervened and got them rehired.

Also during Ramadan of 1078 (March–April), Fakhr ad-Dawla had had a minbar (pulpit) made at his expense and bearing the titles of al-Muqtadi. It later ended up broken up and burned down.

In 1081, the caliph sent Fakhr ad-Dawla to Isfahan, laden with gifts and over 20,000 dinars, to negotiate marriage with Malik-Shah's daughter. Malik-Shah was grieving the death of his son Da'ud and did not take part i; the negotiations; rather, Fakhr ad-Dawla went to Nizam al-Mulk. The two worked together this time; they went to the princess's foster mother, Turkan Khatun, to make their request. She was disinterested at first because the Ghaznavid ruler had made a better offer: 100,000 dinars. Arslan Khatun, who had been married to al-Qa'im, told her that a marriage with the caliph would be more prestigious, and that she should not be asking the caliph for more money.

Eventually, Turkan Khatun agreed to the marriage, but with heavy conditions imposed on al-Muqtadi: in return for marrying the Seljuk princess, al-Muqtadi would pay 50,000 dinars plus an additional 100,000 dinars as mahr (bridal gift), give up his current wives and concubines, and agree to not have sexual relations with any other woman. This was an especially heavy significant burden on the Abbasid caliph, since the Abbasids had been tightly controlling their "reproductive politics", with all their heirs being born to umm walads (concubines) and therefore unrelated to any rival dynasties. By agreeing to Turkan Khatun's terms, Fakhr ad-Dawla was putting al-Muqtadi at a severe disadvantage while also benefitting the Seljuks considerably.

In 1083, al-Muqtadi removed the Banu Jahir from office by decree. The circumstances of their removal from office are somewhat unclear - historians gave varying accounts. In Sibt ibn al-Jawzi's version, al-Muqtadi had become suspicious of the Banu Jahir, prompting them to leave for Khorasan without requesting official permission; this further aroused al-Muqtadi's suspicions and he retroactively fired them after they had left. He then wrote to the Seljuks, telling them not to employ the Banu Jahir in their administration. In Ibn al-Athir's version, the Seljuks at some point approached al-Muqtadi and asked to employ the Banu Jahir themselves, and al-Muqtadi agreed. Al-Bundari offers no details about the firing itself but wrote instead that the Seljuks sent representatives to meet the Banu Jahir in Baghdad (rather than in Khorasan).

According to Ibn al-Athir's account, the Banu Jahir left Baghdad on Saturday, 22 July 1083. They were succeeded as viziers by Abu'l-Fath al-Muzaffar, son of the ra'is al-ru'asa', who had previously been "in charge of the palace buildings".

== Working for the Seljuks ==
According to Ibn al-Athir, Malik-Shah and Nizam al-Mulk gave a dignified reception to Fakhr ad-Dawla when he arrived. Malik-Shah appointed Fakhr ad-Dawla to govern the Diyar Bakr, with sikkah and khutbah rights (i.e. the right to strike coins, and have the khutbah proclaimed, in his own name as well as Malik-Shah's), and presented him with robes of honor and ceremonial drums. He also assigned troops to Fakhr ad-Dawla and told him to conquer the Diyar Bakr from the Marwanids. (Note: The wording used by Claude Cahen seems to imply that the Marwanid campaign was Fakhr ad-Dawla's idea, not Malik-Shah's.)

The Diyar Bakr campaign turned out to be more difficult than expected, partly because of intervention from the Uqaylid ruler of Mosul, Muslim ibn Quraysh. Muslim reasoned that, since the Marwanids had never caused trouble for the Seljuks, but he himself had, then if the Marwanids fell he would likely be next in line. The campaign ended up lasting until 1085 and involved several sieges, including at Mayyafariqin and Amid. Fakhr ad-Dawla's sons, Amid ad-Dawla and al-Kafi Za'im al-Ru'asa Abu'l-Qasim Ali, both assisted him during this campaign. Eventually, the Banu Jahir were successful: they captured Mosul in 1084, and then in 1085 they took Mayyafariqin and Amid.

However, Fakhr ad-Dawla quickly became unpopular as a governor and was replaced by the end of the lunar year (i.e. 478 AH, or 1085-86 CE). Apparently during his short time in office he had taken the Marwanids' wealth for himself and spent a lot of it. However, by 1089 (482 AH) Fakhr ad-Dawla had been appointed governor of Mosul, his birthplace, and he died there in 1090.
