= Zahir al-Din Nishapuri =

Zahir al-Din Nishapuri (died c. 1184) was a Persian writer and the author of the Saljuq-nama ("Book of Seljuk [Empire]"), an important source regarding the history of the Seljuk Empire. The life of Nishapuri is obscure; he is reported to have served as tutor of the previous Seljuk sultans, Ghiyath ad-Din Mas'ud (r. 1134–1152) and Arslan ibn Tughril (r. 1153). Although the Saljuq-nama is now lost, it was used as the primary source of the contemporary Persian historian Muhammad ibn Ali Rawandi.

== Sources ==
- Bosworth, C.E. (1995). "Nīs̲h̲āpūrī". In Bosworth, C. E.; van Donzel, E.; Heinrichs, W. P. & Lecomte, G. (eds.). The Encyclopaedia of Islam, Second Edition. Volume VIII: Ned–Sam. Leiden: E. J. Brill. p. 64. ISBN 978-90-04-09834-3.
