= Rahat al-sudur =

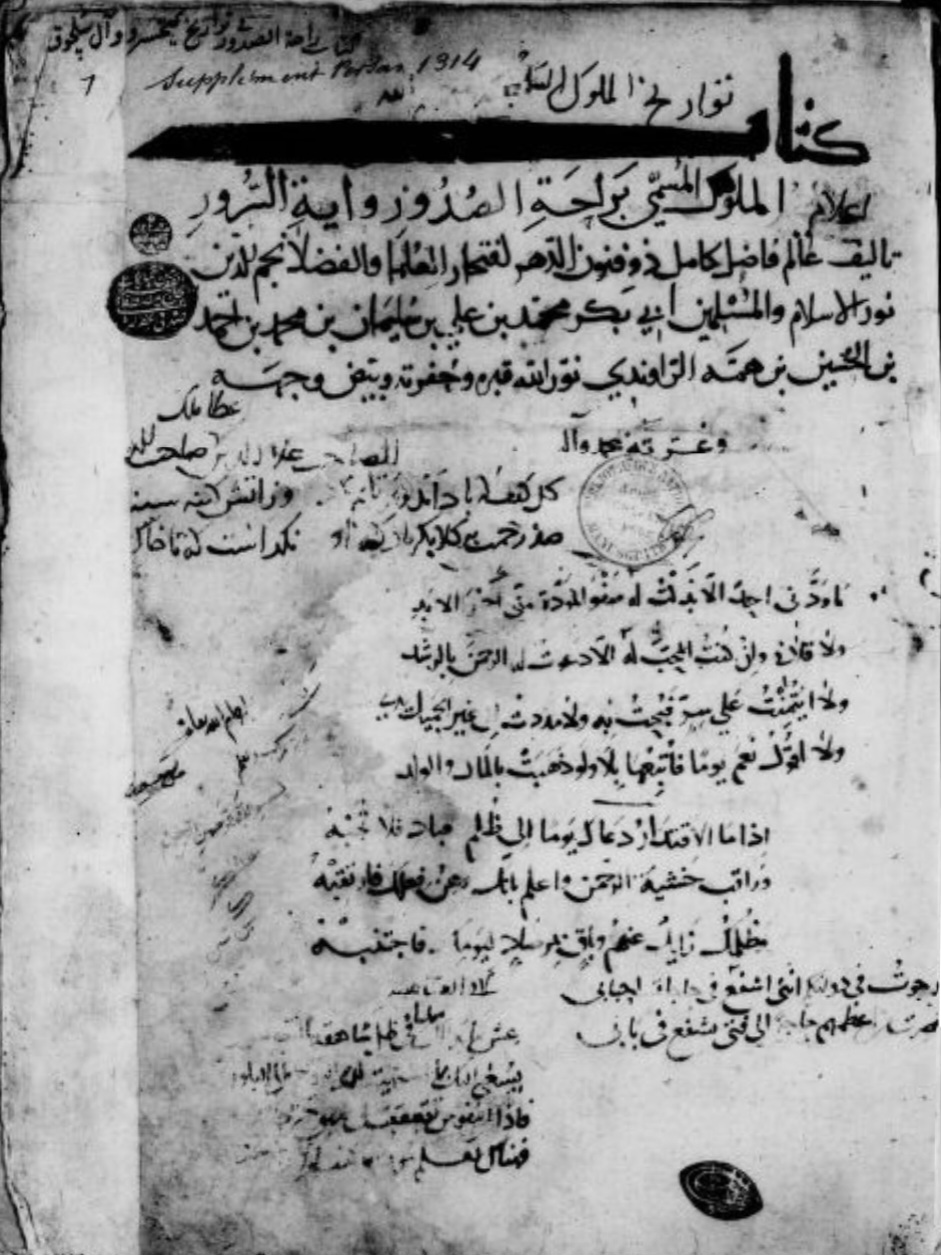
Title page of the only known manuscript of Rahat al-sudur, preserved in the Bibliothèque nationale de France (MS Suppl. Persan 1314), copied in Konya in 1238 CE.

The Rahat al-sudur wa-ayat al-surur or Rahat al-sudur (Persian: راحة الصدور), is a history of the Great Seljuq Empire, its breakup into minor beys and the subsequent Khwarazmian occupation, written by the Persian historian Muhammad bin Ali Rawandi and finished around 1204/1205. Rawandi was encouraged and supported in his endeavour by Shihab al-Din al-Kashani. Written in Persian and originally dedicated to Toghrul III of Seljuq, Rawandi re-dedicated his work to the Sultan of Rum, Kaykhusraw I.

== Content ==
Started around 1202-1203, the Rahat al-sudur was presumably meant be dedicated to Shah Toghrul III of the Seljuq Empire, however after Toghrul's death Rawandi had to find a suitable patron. Following Toghrul's death, Rawandi changed the direction of his writing to an Anatolian focus and dedicated his work to the Sultan of Rum, Kaykhusraw I, though he most likely never went to Konya.

Rawandi appears to have intended the Rahat al-sudur to be a historical work, yet the book contains chapters on backgammon, chess, calligraphy, horsemanship, hunting and feasting. Through the use of poetry, illuminating tales, and proverbs from Arabic and Persian, the Rahat al-sudur seeks to provide an example of exemplary kingship. The early history of the Seljuqs written in the Rahat al-sudur, relies heavily upon the Saljuq-nama. Events after 1175, however, were directly witnessed by Rawandi as a member of Toghrul III's court, making the Rahat al-sudur an invaluable source for Toghrul's reign. The final two chapters encompass the sultanate of Toghrul III, the last Seljuq beys and the Khwarazmian invasion. The final section consists of Hanafi legal works and courtly accomplishments. The book, finished around 1204/1205, is written in a moralizing nature.

Rawandi viewed the Sultanate of Rum as champions of the Sunni faith and deplored the Khwarazmians. According to the Rahat al-sudur, the Seljuqs held the Ghaznavids in contempt due to their slave origins.

The Rahat al-sudur was translated into Turkish during the reign of Ottoman Sultan Murad II.

== Modern era ==
In 1921, the Rahat al-sudur was published by Muhammad Iqbal (died 1938). It was recognized by Iqbal, Edward G. Browne and Mirza Muhammad Qazwini as a source in other texts, namely Jami' al-tawarikh of Rashid al-Din Hamadani (died 1318), Rawdat al-safa of Mirkhvand (died 1498) and Tarikh-i guzida of Hamdallah Mustawfi (died after 1339/40).

== See also ==
- Akhbar al-dawla al-saljuqiyya

== Sources ==
- Bosworth, C.E., ed. (2001). The History of the Seljuq Turks: from the Jāmi al-Tawārīkh : an Ilkhanid Adaptation of the Saljuq nama. Translated by Luther, Kenneth Allin. Curzon Press.
- Hillenbrand, Carole (2005). "Rāvandī, the Seljuk Court at Konya and the Persianisation of Anatolian Cities". Mésogeios. 25–26: 157–170.
- Hillenbrand, Carole (2016). "Some Reflections on Seljuq Historiography". In Eastmond, Antony (ed.). Eastern Approaches to Byzantium: Papers from the Thirty-third Spring Symposium of Byzantine Studies. Routledge. p. 73-88.
- Meisami, Julie Scott (1999). Persian historiography to the end of the twelfth century. Edinburgh University Press.
- Meisami, Julie Scott (2003). "The Collapse of the Great Saljuqs". In Richards, Donald S.; Robinson, Chase F. (eds.). Texts, documents, and Artefacts. BRILL.
- Spuler, Bertold; Marcinkowski, M. Ismail (1968). Persian Historiography and Geography. BRILL.
- Tetley, G.E. (2009). Ghaznavid and Seljuk Turks: Poetry as a Source for Iranian History. Routledge.
