= Al-Muqtadi =

Abbasid Caliph in Baghdad (r. 1075–1094)

Al-Muqtadi المقتدي
- Khalīfah; Amir al-Mu'minin
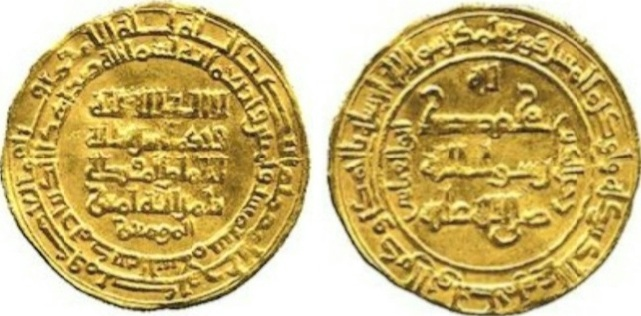
- Gold dinar of al-Muqtadi

27th Caliph of the Abbasid Caliphate Abbasid Caliph in Baghdad
- Reign: 2 April 1075 – 3 February 1094
- Predecessor: Al-Qa'im
- Successor: Al-Mustazhir
- Born: 24 July 1056; Baghdad, Abbasid Caliphate
- Died: 3 February 1094 (aged 37); Baghdad, Abbasid Caliphate
- Consort: Sifri Khatun; Mah Malek Khatun; Tayf al-Khayal
- Issue: Al-Mustazhir; Jafar
Names
- Abū'l-Qasim ʿAbd Allāh ibn Muhammad ibn al-Qa'im
Era name and dates
- Later Abbasid era: 11th century
- Dynasty: Abbasid
- Father: Dhakirat al-Mulk ibn al-Qa'im
- Mother: Qurrut al-Ayn Urjuman
- Religion: Sunni Islam

Abū'l-Qasim ʿAbd Allāh ibn Muhammad ibn al-Qa'im (Arabic: أبو القاسم عبد الله بن محمد بن القائم) better known by his regnal name al-Muqtadi (Arabic: المقتدي 'the follower'; 1056 – February 1094) was the Abbasid caliph in Baghdad from 1075 to 1094. He succeeded his grandfather caliph al-Qa'im in 1075 as the twenty-seventh Abbasid caliph.

== Biography ==
He was born to Dhakirat al-Mulk Muhammad, the son of caliph Al-Qa'im, and an Armenian slave girl named Urjuman also known as Qurrut al-Ayn. His full name was ʿAbd Allāh ibn Muhammad ibn al-Qa'im and his Kunya was Abū'l-Qasim. He was born on 24 July 1056.

When al-Qa'im was on his deathbed in 1075, Fakhr ad-Dawla took charge of his personal care - al-Qa'im did not want bloodletting but Fakhr ad-Dawla had it done anyway. Before he died, al-Qa'im advised his grandson and successor al-Muqtadi to keep the Banu Jahir in their position: "I have not seen better persons for the dawla than Ibn Jahir and his son; do not turn away from them." Al-Muqtadi ascended to the throne on 2 April 1075.

In 1077, deadly riots broke out in Baghdad between the city's Hanbali and Ash'ari factions when Abu Nasr ibn al-Ustadh Abi al-Qasim al-Qushayri arrived in town to become lecturer at the city's nizamiyya. During the riots, Nizam al-Mulk's son Mu'ayyad al-Mulk's life was endangered. Nizam al-Mulk blamed Fakhr ad-Dawla for the whole affair and in 1078 sent his representative Gohar-A'in to the caliph to demand Fakhr ad-Dawla's removal and to have the Banu Jahir's followers arrested. Gohar-A'in arrived on 23 July and was granted an audience on Tuesday, 14 August, during which he handed over a letter requesting Fakhr ad-Dawla's removal. Al-Muqtadi initially balked at the demand, but by 27 August Gohar-A'in was threatening to attack the palace unless he complied. At that point, al-Muqtadi had no choice – the Abbasids lacked a military of their own and were powerless to resist Seljuk interference. Fakhr ad-Dawla resigned (instead of being fired) and al-Muqtadi had him placed under house arrest.

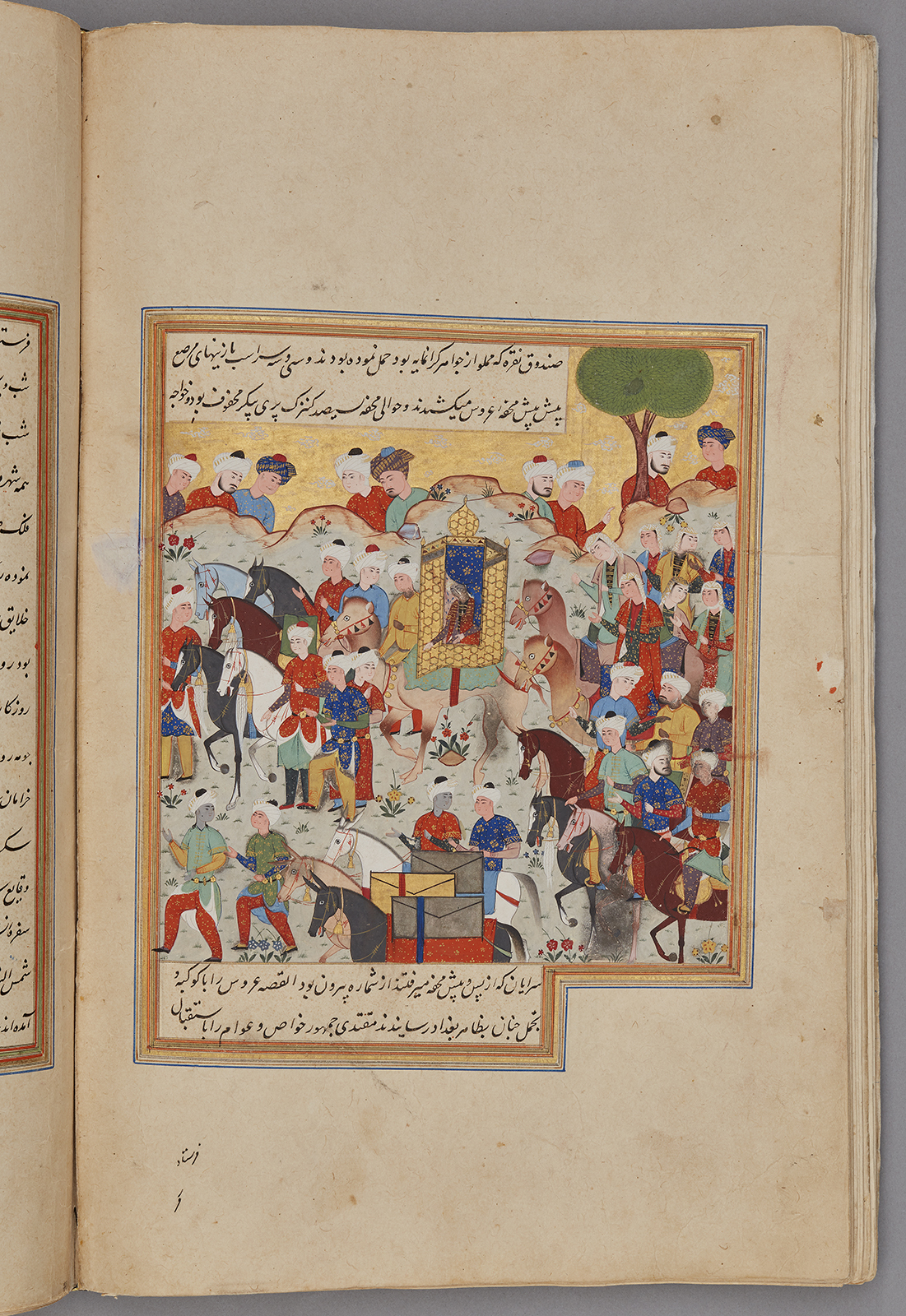
Mah-i Mulk Khatun depicted in the center of a procession from Isfahan to Baghdad, for her upcoming marriage to Muqtadi in 1087. Nizam al-Mulk is also depicted accompanying the procession. Folio from a manuscript of Nigaristan, Iran, probably Shiraz, dated 1573–74.

Meanwhile, Amid ad-Dawla had left for Isfahan once he heard of Nizam al-Mulk's plans. He took a circuitous route through the mountains to avoid running into Gohar-A'in on the way, and he reached Isfahan on 23 July – the same day that Gohar A'in reached Baghdad. Amid ad-Dawla met with Nizam al-Mulk, and the two parties eventually reconciled, which they sealed with a marriage contract between Nizam al-Mulk's granddaughter and Amid ad-Dawla. Al-Muqtadi did not initially rehire the Banu Jahir and instead kept them under house arrest, but Nizam al-Mulk later intervened and got them rehired.

In 1081, the caliph sent Fakhr ad-Dawla to Isfahan, laden with gifts and over 20,000 dinars, to negotiate marriage with Malik-Shah's daughter. Malik-Shah was grieving the death of his son Da'ud and did not take part i; the negotiations; rather, Fakhr ad-Dawla went to Nizam al-Mulk. The two worked together this time; they went to the princess's foster mother, Turkan Khatun, to make their request. She was disinterested at first because the Ghaznavid ruler had made a better offer: 100,000 dinars. Khadija Arslan Khatun, who had been married to al-Qa'im, told her that a marriage with the caliph would be more prestigious, and that she should not be asking the caliph for more money.

Eventually, Turkan Khatun agreed to the marriage, but with heavy conditions imposed on al-Muqtadi: in return for marrying the Seljuk princess, al-Muqtadi would pay 50,000 dinars plus an additional 100,000 dinars as mahr (bridal gift), give up his current wives and concubines, and agree to not have sexual relations with any other woman. This was an especially heavy significant burden on the Abbasid caliph, since the Abbasids had been tightly controlling their "reproductive politics", with all their heirs being born to umm walads and therefore unrelated to any rival dynasties. By agreeing to Turkan Khatun's terms, Fakhr ad-Dawla was putting al-Muqtadi at a severe disadvantage while also benefitting the Seljuks considerably.

In 1083, al-Muqtadi removed the Banu Jahir from office by decree. The circumstances of their removal from office are somewhat unclear - historians gave varying accounts. In Sibt ibn al-Jawzi's version, al-Muqtadi had become suspicious of the Banu Jahir, prompting them to leave for Khorasan without requesting official permission; this further aroused al-Muqtadi's suspicions and he retroactively fired them after they had left. He then wrote to the Seljuks, telling them not to employ the Banu Jahir in their administration. In Ibn al-Athir's version, the Seljuks at some point approached al-Muqtadi and asked to employ the Banu Jahir themselves, and al-Muqtadi agreed. Al-Bundari offers no details about the firing itself but wrote instead that the Seljuks sent representatives to meet the Banu Jahir in Baghdad (rather than in Khorasan).

According to Ibn al-Athir's account, the Banu Jahir left Baghdad on Saturday, 22 July 1083. They were succeeded as viziers by Abu'l-Fath al-Muzaffar, son of the ra'is al-ru'asa', who had previously been "in charge of the palace buildings".

Al-Muqtadi was honored by the Seljuk sultan Malik-Shah I, during whose reign the Caliphate was recognized throughout the extending range of Seljuk conquest. Arabia, with the Holy Cities, now recovered from the Fatimids, acknowledged again the spiritual jurisdiction of the Abbasids.

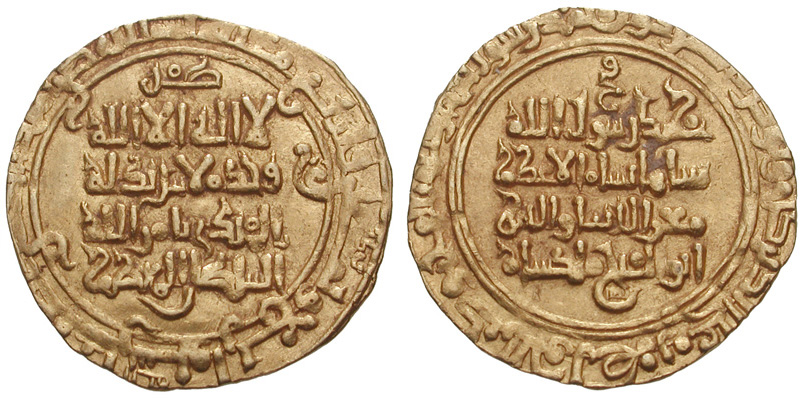
Gold Dinar minted with Al-Muqtadi and Malik Shah I name with the Shahada 484 AH/1091/2 AD. (Citing Al-Muqtadi as the Head of State over Seljuk Sultanate)

Malik-Shah I arranged a marriage between his daughter and al-Muqtadi, possibly planning on the birth of a son who could serve as both caliph and sultan. Though the couple had a son, the mother left with her infant with the court of Isfahan. Following the failure of the marriage, the Sultan grew critical of the Caliph's interference in affairs of state, and sent an order for him to retire to Basra. The death of Malik-Shah I shortly after, however, made the command inoperative.

In 1092, when Malik Shah I was assassinated shortly after Nizam al-Mulk, Taj al-Mulk nominated Mahmud as Sultan and set out for Isfahan. Mahmud was a child, and his mother Terken Khatun wished to seize power in his stead. To accomplish this, she entered negotiations with the Caliph al-Muqtadi to secure her rule. The Caliph opposed both a child and a woman as ruler, and could not be persuaded to allow the khutba, the sign of the sovereign, to be proclaimed in the name of a woman. Eventually, however, the Caliph agreed to let her govern if the khutba was said in the name of her son, and if she did so assisted by a vizier he appointed for her, a condition she saw herself forced to accept.

== Religious policy ==
At the request of the caliph al-Muqtadi, Sultan Malik Shah decided to launch an expedition against the Qarmatian militant religious sect. In 1075, Malik-Shah sent an army under the command of Hajib Kichkine against the Qarmatians. Before embarking on the campaign, Hajib Kiçkine made several agreements and formed an alliance. The Seljuk army under the command of Hajib Kiçkine left Isfahan and arrived in Basra. Shortly thereafter, they were joined by Gevherayin the Military administrator of Baghdad and Seljuk army set out for Qatif. During this journey, the Qays and Qubas tribes in the region launched plundering attacks against the Seljuk army. In the ensuing battle between the two sides, the Seljuk army was victorious. When the Seljuk army approached Qatif, he sent a message to the city's ruler, Yahya ibn Abbas. However, Yahya ibn Abbas, citing his war with the Qays and Qubas tribes as justifications, refused to honor previous agreements and threatened the Seljuks. Consequently, Yahya ibn Abbas was defeated in the ensuing battle. Later, Yahya ibn Abbas made an agreement with the Qays and Qubas tribes, attacked the Seljuk army, and plundered its supplies and logistics. The hardship left Hajib Kiçkine and the Seljuk army weakened. A sudden raid by Yahya ibn Abbas and his allies later disintegrated the Seljuk army under Hajib Kiçkine. The Seljuk forces retreating towards Basra returned without the opportunity to fight the Qarmatians.

Following the failure of Hajib Kiçkine, Sultan Malik-Shah due to caliph al-Muqtadi's endorsement, assigned a 7,000-strong Seljuk army under the command of Artuk Bey to launch an expedition against the Qarmatians. The Seljuk army under Artuk Bey first marched to Qatif. Hearing of the Seljuks arrival, Yahya ibn Abbas fled to Bahrain, and the Seljuks captured Qatif. The Seljuks then attacked the Qarmatians in Ahsa and besieged them in their castle. After the Qarmatians requested peace and an agreement was reached, Artuk Bey lifted the siege. Following this, he launched a successful attack on the Qarmatians in Bahrain and brought them under his control. Following these campaigns, Artuk Bey went to Baghdad, the capital of Abbasids, leaving a 200-man detachment under his brother Alpkuş as his proxy. Supported by the Arab tribes of Azd and Amir Rebia, the Qarmatians, emboldened by Artuk Bey's departure from Ahsa with a large portion of his army, attacked the Seljuks and their allies. In a battle fought between the two sides near Beyberrahbeteyn, the Qarmatians were defeated. The Seljuk allies captured the fortress of Ahsa, but they refused to allow the Seljuk army to enter. After this defeat, the Qarmatians launched an attack with their allies. In the battle between the two sides near Ahsa, the Qarmatians and their allies were defeated and suffered heavy losses. A dispute later arose between Abdullah ibn Ali and Alpkuş. Abdullah ibn Ali killed Alpkuş. Artuk Bey, upon hearing of his brother's death, marched with his army and besieged the fortress of Ahsa, where Abdullah ibn Ali was stationed. After a fierce siege, Artuk captured Abdullah ibn Ali's son in exchange for his brother and lifted the siege.

About al-Muqtadi's treatment of Jews, Obadiah the Proselyte, who lived in Baghdad towards the end of al-Muqtadi's reign, records:

Al-Muqtadi told Abu Shuja, his vizier, to mark the Jews dwelling in the city of Baghdad with distinctive dress, and he sought many times to destroy them, but the God of Israel thwarted his intent and hid them from his wrath. [Abu Shuja] put a yellow sign upon the head of each Jew and a silvermithqal of lead on the neck of each Jew, which was inscribed "dhimmi"—for the Jews were to be taxed. He also required the Jews to wear [yellow] girdles. Abu Shuja had two signs placed upon the Jewish women: the shoes belonging to each woman had to be one red and the other black, and each woman had to wear a small brass bell on her shoe or neck, in order by their sound to distinguish between Jewish and gentile women. He further appointed cruel men over the Jewish men, and cruel women over the Jewish women, to oppress them with every kind of curse, spite, and shame. The gentiles would mock them, and the am ha'aretz and their children would strike the Jews in all the areas of the city. Now this was the tax which [Al-Muqtadi] ordered to be levied over the Jews. . .

Also during Ramadan of 1078 (March–April), Fakhr ad-Dawla had a minbar (pulpit) made at his expense and bearing the titles of al-Muqtadi. It later ended up broken up and burned down.

During Malik Shah's time in Baghdad, Malik-Shah establish influence over the Hejaz and Yemen. The commanders of the army prepared by his order. When news of Malik-Shah's presence in Baghdad reached the Hejaz, khutbahs were again delivered in the Hejaz in the name of the Seljuk sultan and the Abbasid caliph. Following this, the Seljuk army captured Yemen and Aden for a short while. This led to recovery of the two Holy Cities from the Fatimids and initial revival of the religious–political supremacy of Abbasid Caliph within Fatimid Egypt.

== Family ==
Al-Muqtadi's first wife was Sifri Khatun. She was the daughter of Sultan Alp Arslan. In 1071–72, his father Al-Qa'im sent his wazir Ibn Al-Jahir to ask her hand in marriage, to which demand the Sultan agreed. His second wife was Mah Malek Khatun, daughter of Sultan Malik-Shah I. In March 1082, Al-Muqtadi sent Abu Nasr ibn Jahir to Malik Shah in Isfahan to ask for her hand in marriage. Her father gave his consent, and the marriage contract was concluded. She arrived in Baghdad in March 1087. The marriage was consummated in May 1087. She gave birth to Prince Ja'far on 31 January 1088. But then Al-Muqtadi began to avoid her, and she asked permission to return home. She left Baghdad for Khurasan on 29 May 1089, accompanied by her son. Subsequently, news of her death reached Baghdad. Her ailing father brought her son back to Baghdad in October 1092. Prince Ja'far was taken back to the Caliphal Palace, where he remained until his death on 21 June 1093. He was buried near the caliphal tombs in the Rusafah Cemetery. One of Al-Muqtadi's concubines was Kalbahaar or Jalb'har, also known as Tayf al-Khayal. She was a Turkish and was the mother of caliph Al-Mustazhir.

== Succession ==
Al-Muqtadi died on 3rd February 1094 at the age of 37–38. He was succeeded by his sixteen year-old son Ahmad al-Mustazhir as Caliph.

Just a months after is accession to the Caliphal throne al-Mustazhir became angry with his paternal grand aunt (paternal aunt of al-Muqtadi), In 1094, the new Caliph compelled his grand aunt, Sayyida bint Abdallah al-Qa'im to remain in her house lest she should intrigue for his overthrow. She died on 20 October 1102 during al-Mustazhir's reign.

== See also ==
- Banu Jahir, family of viziers that were prominent under al-Muqtadi's reign

Al-Muqtadi Abbasid dynasty Born: 1056 Died: February 1094
Sunni Islam titles
Preceded by Al-Qa'im	Caliph of Islam; Abbasid Caliph; 2 April 1075 – February 1094	Succeeded by Al-Mustazhir
