= Muhammad ibn Sulayman Kashghari =

Vizier of the Seljuq empire

Muhammad ibn Sulayman Kashghari was a Turkic merchant, who served as the vizier of the Seljuk sultan Ahmad Sanjar (r. 1118–1157) from March 1122 to March 1124. He had won over the favour Sanjar through his proficiency of Turkic and a vast bribe of million dinars. However, he was dismissed two years later due to inefficiency and corruption.

Kashghari is portrayed in a negative light by the Persian historians Uqayli (died 16th-century) and Muhammad Khwandamir (died 1534/37), who mention his "ignorance, evil nature, unpleasant appearance, and dishonesty." The source of their report is unknown, and may in part be due to Persian prejudice towards the Turks, specifically against one who occupied the exclusively Persian-preserved office of vizier. Kashghari was the first and last Turkic vizier of Sanjar. He was succeeded by Mukhtass al-Mulk.

== Sources ==
- Tetley, Gillies (2008). The Ghaznavid and Seljuk Turks: Poetry as a Source for Iranian History. Routledge. ISBN 978-1-134-08438-8.

Preceded by Sharaf al-Din Abu Tahir Sa'd	Vizier of the Seljuk Empire; March 1122–March 1124	Succeeded by Mukhtass al-Mulk
