= Taj al-Din Khatun =

Mother of Sultan Muhammad Tapar and Ahmad Sanjar

Taj al-Din Safariyya or Safariyya Khatun, known as Taj al-Din Khatun (d. 1121 or 1122), was a concubine of the third Seljuk sultan Malik-Shah I, and the mother of Sultan Muhammad Tapar and Sultan Ahmad Sanjar.

== Life ==
Taj al-Din Safariyya Khatun was of concubine origin and of Kipchak Turkic descent. In the Dīwān Lughāt al-Turk, written by Mahmud al-Kashgari, and the Jāmiʿ al-Tawārīkh, written by Rashid al-Din Fazlullah, her name appears as Bashulu. Another rendering of her name is Bushali. Her marriage to the Seljuk sultan Malik-Shah I was the first sultan-concubine marriage among the Seljuks. Although earlier sultans had relationships with concubines, none had married a concubine. Sultan Malik-Shah I consulted Taj al-Din Safariyya Khatun on certain matters and often implemented her sound decisions. During the Syrian campaign, Malik-Shah I took Taj al-Din Safariyya Khatun with him despite her being pregnant, and Ahmad Sanjar was born in the Sinjar region during this campaign. According to the sources, Taj al-Din Safariyya Khatun was greatly loved by Sultan Malik-Shah.

In the Great Seljuk Empire, the wives of sultans had viziers attached to them. The vizier of Taj al-Din Safariyya Khatun was Sharaf al-Din Abu Tahir Sa'd b. Ali b. Isa al-Kummi, who would later also serve as vizier to Sultan Ahmad Sanjar.

Sultan Malik-Shah died in 1092. Following her husband's death, Taj al-Din Safariyya Khatun supported her sons Muhammad Tapar and Ahmad Sanjar. As she had great influence over her sons, she was influential in the administration of the territories placed under their rule. She also ensured that her sons supported one another. Indeed, Ahmad Sanjar supported his full elder brother Muhammad Tapar against Barkiyaruq.

Later, Muhammad Tapar and Ahmad Sanjar became sultans of the Great Seljuk Empire. Sibt ibn al-Jawzi, a historian who lived during this period, said of Taj al-Din Safariyya Khatun: 'This woman is one of the very few fortunate women recorded in history. For it is exceedingly rare in history for the two sons of a woman both to become caliphs or sultans.'

Safariyya Khatun remained politically influential during the reigns of her sons. The best-known example was her reconciliation of her son Ahmad Sanjar and Mahmud, the son of Muhammad Tapar, during their dispute. She is known to have said to her son Ahmad Sanjar, 'You conquered the regions around Ghazna and Transoxiana, gained control over many places, and gave all of them back to their owners. Consider your brother's son as one of them.' Sultan Ahmad Sanjar accepted his mother's request. After this incident, when Mahmud came to declare his obedience to his uncle, he stayed with his grandmother Safariyya Khatun. Safariyya Khatun also played a major role in the marriage between Ahmad Sanjar's daughter Mah-i Mulk and Mahmud.

Taj al-Din Safariyya Khatun died in 1121 or 1122 in Merv. Her son, Sultan Ahmad Sanjar, performed her funeral prayer. According to Ibn al-Athir, Mahmud ibn Muhammad Tapar organized a mourning ceremony in Baghdad upon the death of his grandmother that was unprecedented in the city up to that time. Taj al-Din Safariyya Khatun is described as a charitable person. She is the only Seljuk woman who is mentioned with great praise in the sources. The poet Mu'izzi composed poems in her praise. In his divan, in which he dedicated numerous qasidas to her, he referred to her by the epithet “tāj-i dīn u dunyā”, meaning the crown of religion and the world.

== Children ==
As the concubine of Malik-Shah I, Taj al-Din Khātūn al-Safarriyya had five children; three sons and two daughters. One of her sons died in childhood, while her two surviving sons were the later sultans Muhammad I Tapar and Ahmad Sanjar. Her daughter was Ismah Khatun, who later married the 28th Abbasid caliph, Al-Mustazhir (r. 1094–1118).

- Muhammad I Tapar
- Ahmad Sanjar
- Ismah Khatun (married the Abbasid Caliph Al-Mustazhir. After the caliph's death, she married Arslan-Shah, a grandson of Kavurd from the Seljuk dynasty.)
- Sitara Khatun (married Gershasb of the Kakuyid dynasty.)
- An unnamed son who died at a young age.

== In popular culture ==
- Pınar Töre portrayed Başulu Hatun in the Turkish historical series Uyanış: Büyük Selçuklu, which aired on TRT 1.
