= Ismah Khatun =

Seljuk princess and wife of caliph al-Mustazhir

Ismah Khatun اسماعه خاتون

Wife of the Abbasid caliph
- Tenure: 1109 – 1118
- Born: Isfahan
- Died: after 1119; Isfahan
- Burial: Barracks Market of Isfahan
- Spouse: Al-Mustazhir
- Children: Abu Ishaq Ibrahim ibn Ahmad al-Mustazhir
Names
- Ismah Khatun Malik Shah.
Era name and dates
- Later Abbasid era: 12th century
- Dynasty: Seljuk
- Father: Malik-Shah I
- Mother: Taj al-Din Khatun
- Religion: Sunni Islam

Ismah Khatun (Persian: اسماعه خاتون, Arabic: عصمة خاتون) was a Seljuk princess, daughter of sultan Malik Shah (r. 1072–1092) and principal wife of Abbasid caliph al-Mustazhir (r. 1094–1118).

== Biography ==
Ismah Khatun was one of the youngest daughters of Seljuk sultan Malik-Shah I. She was very young when her father died in 1092; he was succeeded by his underage son Mahmud I under the regency of Terken Khatun, who was the regent during his minority in 1092–1094.

Later, her other brothers, Berkyaruq, Malik-Shah II and Muhammad Tapar also became Sultans.

=== Marriage ===
She was one of Al-Mustazhir's wives. She was the daughter of Seljuk Sultan Malik-Shah I. Al-Mustazhir married her in Isfahan in 1109. She later came to Baghdad and took up residence in the Caliphal palace. On 3 February 1112, she gave birth to prince Abu Ishaq Ibrahim, who died of smallpox in October 1114, and was buried in the mausoleum of al-Muqtadir in Rusafah Cemetery, beside his uncle-cousin Ja'far, son of the caliph al-Muqtadi (father of Mustazhir) and Mah Malek Khatun (half-sister of Ismah). Upon the death of Al-Mustazhir, Ismah returned to Isfahan, where she died, and was buried within the law college that she had founded there on Barracks Market Street.

Her husband died in 1118. In the same year her brother sultan Muhammad Tapar also died.

After the death of her husband, he was succeeded by al-Mustarshid. He was Al-Mustazhir's son from a concubine Lubanah. She was from Baghdad.

== See also ==
- Gawhar Khatun

== Sources ==
- Lambton, A.K.S. (1988). Continuity and Change in Medieval Persia. Bibliotheca Persica. Bibliotheca Persica. ISBN 978-0-88706-133-2.
- al-Sāʿī, Ibn; Toorawa, Shawkat M.; Bray, Julia (2017). Women and the Court of Baghdad. Library of Arabic Literature. NYU Press. pp. 62, 65
