= Abu Shuja al-Rudhrawari =

Abū Shujā' al-Rūdhrāwarī

Abbasid Vizier
- In office 1078–1078
- Monarch: al-Muqtadi
- Preceded by: Banu Jahir
- Succeeded by: Banu Jahir
- In office December 1083 or January 1084 – April or May 1091
- Monarch: al-Muqtadi
- Preceded by: Banu Jahir
- Succeeded by: Fakhr ad-Dawla ibn Jahir

Personal details
- Born: 1045 (437 AH) Kangavar
- Died: June 1095 (Jumada II, 488 AH) Madinah

Abū Shujā' Muḥammad ibn al-Ḥusayn al-Rūdhrāwarī, also known by the honorific "Zaḥīr al-Dīn", was an 11th-century government official and author who served as vizier for the Abbasid Caliphate twice, once briefly in 1078 and the second time from 1083/4 until 1094. He wrote a continuation to Miskawayh's history Tajārib al-umam. He also wrote a diwan of poetry, of which about 80 verses survive.

== Biography ==
Abu Shuja al-Rudhrawari was born in Kangavar in 1045 (437 AH). His father was originally from the Rudhrawar district near Hamadan, hence the name "Rudhrawari".

His first term as vizier was very short in 1078 (471 AH), after the dismissal of the Banu Jahir. His second term in office was much longer: he was appointed in December 1083 or January 1084 (Sha'ban, 476 AH) and stayed in office until April or May 1091 (Safar or Rabi' I, 484 AH).

In 1091, an altercation broke out in Baghdad involving Ibn Samha, a Jewish commercial agent of the Seljuk vizier Nizam al-Mulk, and a Muslim carpet seller. In response, Abu Shuja promulgated a harsh anti-dhimmi edict on behalf of the caliph, enforcing them to wear a ghiyar to distinguish them from Muslims. (Note: Abu Shuja's exact role in this edict is somewhat unclear. Obadiah the Proselyte has al-Muqtadi wrote that "al-Muqtadi empowered his second-in-command, whose name was Abishuga, to take discriminatory action against the Jews". Ibn al-Jawzi attributes the anti-dhimmi laws to al-Muqtadi without mentioning Abu Shuja. Meanwhile, the later Geniza epistle attributes them to Abu Shuja without mentioning al-Muqtadi.) These restrictions were especially harsh and intended to be as humiliating as possible to dhimmis. Based on the accounts of Ibn al-Jawzi and Obadiah the Proselyte, an Italian convert to Judaism who was in Iraq around 1120, the distinguishing features included the zunnar, necklaces with a pendant saying "dhimmi", and distinct black and/or red shoes. Obadiah also wrote that every Jewish woman had to wear a small brass bell either around her throat or on her shoe, so that the noise would serve to mark her as Jewish. (Note: He didn't say whether this also applied to non-Jewish dhimmis, or to men as well.) Based on Obadiah's account, these distinctions had the effect of singling out Jews for special physical and verbal abuse. (Note: Obadiah's focus was specifically on the Jewish community, so if non-Jewish dhimmis were singled out for abuse as well, then he didn't write about it.)

The edict specifically stated that these restrictions also applied to government officials. According to Ibn al-Athir, many dhimmi government officials went into hiding due to the edict. (Note: They were later repealed in 1104 (498 AH). The reason is unknown, although Grayson speculates it may have something to do with the political uncertainty at the time.)

Ibn Samha was upset at Abu Shuja's actions and wrote to Nizam al-Mulk. Besides being Ibn Samha's employer, Nizam al-Mulk also wanted to put the Seljuk sultan's authority on the caliph. Nizam al-Mulk was able to pressure the caliph into firing Abu Shuja. According to Ibn al-Jawzi, he was dismissed from office on Thursday, 9 Ramadan, 484 AH (25 October 1091 CE). According to Ibn Khallikan, this happened instead on Thursday, 19 Safar, 484 AH (12 April 1091 CE). According to Ibn Khallikan, he was put under house arrest and then exiled to Rudhrawar, where he lived for a while before going on hajj in 1094.

In 1094 (478 AH) he went on a pilgrimage to Mecca, and he ended up spending the last year of his life as a mujawir in Madinah until his death in June 1095 (Jumada II, 488 AH). He was buried at the Baqi al-Gharqad cemetery in Madinah.

== Legacy ==
Al-Rudhrawari was highly esteemed by later Muslim sources, who praised him both for his piety and generosity as well as his literary ability. According to Imad ad-Din al-Isfahani, "No vizier had ever displayed such zeal as he for the service of religion and the observance of the law. In all affairs connected with religion he was strict and severe, but in temporal matters, easy and indulgent. Never did he incur the slightest reprehension for remissness in his duty towards God." Ibn al-Sam'ani praised him for his "consummate merit, vast intelligence, dignified conduct, and unerring foresight." Ibn al-Hamadani credited him with helping restore some of the Abbasid caliphate's prestige and respect.

The memory of the edict attributed to Abu Shuja was particularly powerful among the Jewish community. Besides Obadiah the Proselyte, its effects were also mentioned in a heavily fictionalized Judeo-Arabic epistle found in the Cairo Geniza that is a retelling of the Book of Esther. It depicts a period of extended hardship by the Jewish community which it blames on Abu Shuja: "the root of these calamitites was an evil man named Abu Shuja".
