= Saljuq-nama =

Medieval literary work on the history of Seljuks, written around 1175

The Saljūq-Nāma (Persian: سلجوق‌نامه, "Book of Seljuk [Empire]") is a history of the Seljuk Empire written by the Persian historian Zahir al-Din Nishapuri around 1175. Written in New Persian, it has been acknowledged as the primary source for Saljuq material for Persian works from the 13th to 15th centuries, which include the Rahat al-sudur, Jami' al-tawarikh, Tarikh-i guzida, Zubdat al-Tawarikh and Rawzat as-safa. Abu al-Qasim Qashani, a historian who wrote about the Ilkhanids, made alterations and additions to the original text, which was later misidentified as the original Saljuq-nama.

== Content ==
The Saljuq-nama is vague concerning the history of the sultans before Toghrul III, as noted by Claude Cahen, that Nishapuri had "relatively poor sources at his disposal for the Seljuqs before his own lifetime..." Yet it is a short, restrained history using different sources than those used by Arabic writers of that time. Its textual history is complicated; as a preface in rhyme, it first appears as the historical part of a compendium known as Rahat al-sudur. A later version appears in the 14th century compendium of histories known as Jami al-tawarikh, which was compiled by Rashid al-Din Fadl Allah, vizier of the Ilkhanate of Iran.

== Modern era ==
In 1953, Ismail Afshar claimed he had found a copy of the Saljuq-nama. A.H. Morton believes this copy to be a work by Abu al-Qasim Kashani. Accordingly, no copy of the Saljuq-nama is believed to exist today. However, A.H. Morton is producing a text based on MS. Persian 22b which is an anonymous history of the Seljuqs dedicated to Sultan Toghrul III. Morton contends that this is a copy of Nishapuri's original work.

== Sources ==
- Bosworth, C.E., ed. (2001). The History of the Seljuq Turks: from the Jāmi al-Tawārīkh : an Ilkhanid Adaptation of the Saljuq nama. Translated by Luther, Kenneth Allin. Curzon Press.
- Daftary, Farhad (2007). The Ismāʻı̄lı̄s: Their History and Doctrines. Cambridge University Press.
- Lambton, Ann K.S. (1988). Continuity and change in medieval Persia. State University of New York Press.
- Meisami, Julie Scott (1999). Persian Historiography to the End of the Twelfth Century. Edinburgh University Press.
- Safi, Omar (2006). The Politics of Knowledge in Premodern Islam. University of North Carolina Press.
