= Angelika Hartmann =

German university teacher (1944 –2023)

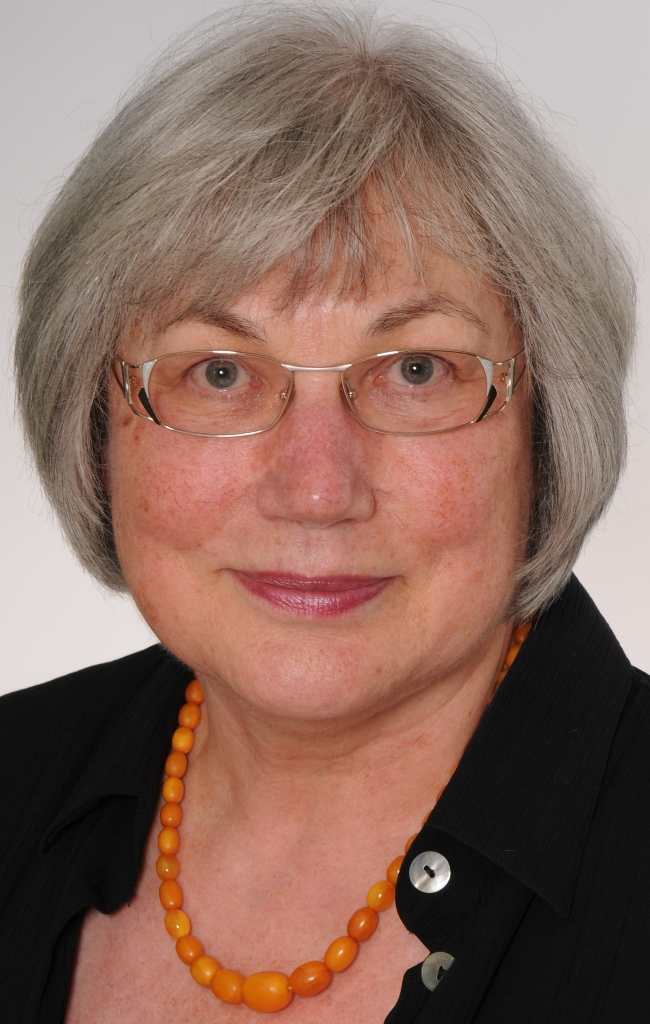
- Angelika Hartmann (2013)
- Born: 3 December 1944; Kassel, Germany
- Died: 1 July 2023 (aged 78); Frankfurt
- Occupations: Writer, university teacher, Islamic scholar

Angelika Hartmann (3 December 1944 in Kassel – 1 July 2023 in Frankfurt) was a German Islamic scholar who worked as a university lecturer at several universities until her retirement in 2009 and most recently as a professor of Islamic studies and languages and Arabic language at the University of Marburg.

== Life ==
Angelica Hartmann studied Islamic studies, German, comparative literature and philosophy at the universities of Göttingen, Hamburg and Istanbul. In 1971 she received her doctorate with distinction from the University of Hamburg on the subject of “al-Nasir” (1225–1180). Politics, religion, culture in the late Abbasid Caliphate. This work examines the history of Islam in the Middle Ages through the Caliphate and religious-political currents in Baghdad. In 1982 he completed her studies at the University of Hamburg, where Hartmann worked as a research assistant from 1971 to 1989 and as a private lecturer in Islamic studies/Arabic studies from 1982. The subject of this work was the revival of the Arabic and analytical version of the relationship between Orthodoxy and Islamic philosophy entitled: Rasef Omar Al-Sahrvardi on the advice of al-Aymaniyah and Kasf al-Fadaih al-Ayunaniyah.

In 1986/1987 Hartman held the chair for Oriental Studies at Saarland University. From 1989 to 1993 she worked as a professor for Arabic and Islamic studies at the University of Würzburg and from 1990 to 1993 as a university women's representative. She was then professor of Islamic studies with a focus on Arab studies at the University of Giessen and head of the Institute for Oriental Studies until 2006. From 2006 to 2008 she was head of the Islamic Studies department at the Center for Near and Middle East Asian Studies at the Philipps University of Marburg. Her main research areas were the cultural history of Islam in the Middle Ages, Arabic and Persian mysticism, theology and concepts of power, Islamism and civil society, and educational consulting.

== Works ==
- An-Nasir li-Din Allah. Politik, Religion, Kultur in der späten Abbasidenzeit. (= Studien zur Sprache, Geschichte und Kultur des islamischen Orients. N.F. Band 8). Berlin/ New York 1975.
- als Hrsg.: Geschichte und Erinnerung im Islam (= Formen der Erinnerung. 15). Göttingen 2004.
- mit S. Damir-Geilsdorf und B. Hendrich (Hrsg.): Mental Maps – Raum – Erinnerung. Kulturwissenschaftliche Zugänge zum Verhältnis von Raum und Erinnerung. (= Kulturwissenschaft: Forschung und Wissenschaft. 1). Münster 2005.
- mit Konrad Schliephake (Hrsg.): Angewandte interdisziplinäre Orientforschung. Stand und Perspektiven im westlichen und östlichen Deutschland. (= Mitteilungen des Deutschen Orient-Instituts. 14). Hamburg 1991. Angelika Hartmann veröffentlichte mehr als 40 Beiträge in Fachzeitschriften und Sammelbänden. Schwerpunkte sind historische sowie auch gegenwartsbezogene kulturwissenschaftliche Untersuchungen. Auswahl:
- Eine orthodoxe Polemik gegen Philosophen und Freidenker – eine zeitgenössische Schrift gegen Hafiz? Mu`in ud-din Yazdi und sein Targuma-yi Rasf an-nasa´ih. In: Der Islam. 56, 1979, S. 274–293.
- Siyah Qalem. Malerei aus mongolisch-türkischem Steppengebiet. In: H. R. Roemer u. A. Noth (Hrsg.): Studien zur Geschichte und Kultur des Vorderen Orients. Festschrift B. Spuler. Leiden 1981, S. 141–166.
- Bemerkungen zu Handschriften `Umar as-Suhrawardis, echten und vermeintlichen Autographen. (= Festschrift A. Dietrich). In: Der Islam. 60, 1983, S. 112–142.
- Sur l´édition d´un texte arabe médiéval. Rasf an-nasa´ih al-imaniya wa-kasf al-fada´ih al-yunaniya de `Umar as-Suhrawardi, composé à Bagdad en 621/1224. In: Der Islam. 62, 1985, S. 71–97.
- Al-Malik al-Mansur (gest. 617/1220), ein ayyubidischer Regent und Geschichtsschreiber. In: ZDMG. 136, 1986, S. 570–606.
- Les ambivalences d´un sermonnaire hanbalite. Ibn al-Gawzi (m. en 597/1201), sa carrière et son Kitab al-Hawatim. In: Annales Islamologiques. 22, 1986, S. 51–115.
- Islamisches Predigtwesen im Mittelalter. In: Saeculum. 38, 1987, S. 336–366.
- Isma`ilitische Theologie bei sunnitischen `ulama´ des Mittelalters? In: L. Hagemann, E. Pulsfort (Hrsg.): Ihr alle aber seid Brüder. Festschrift A. Th. Khoury. Würzburg/ Altenberge 1990, S. 190–206.
- Zyklisches Denken im Islam. Zum Geschichtsbild des Ibn Khaldun (1332–1406). In: E. Ruhe (Hrsg.): Europas islamische Nachbarn. Studien zur Literatur und Geschichte des Maghreb. Würzburg 1993, S. 125–159.
- Kosmogonie und Seelenlehre bei `Umar as-Suhrawardi (st. 632/1234). In: D. Bellmann (Hrsg.): Gedenkschrift W. Reuschel. Stuttgart 1994, S. 135–156.
- Der Islamische „Fundamentalismus“. Wahrnehmung und Realität einer neuen Entwicklung im Islam. In: Aus Politik und Zeitgeschichte. Beilage zur Wochenzeitung Das Parlament, B 28/97, 4. Juli 1997, S. 3–13.
- Zum Begriff „Geheimnis“ (sirr) in der islamischen Mystik. Ein Versuch. In: A. Spitznagel (Hrsg.): Geheimnis und Geheimhaltung. Göttingen/ Bern 1998, S. 67–96.
- Islam und Europa. Von der Notwendigkeit eines kritischen Dialogs. In: Gießener Universitätsblätter. 33, 2000, S. 17–30.
- Pluralismus und Toleranz aus der Sicht des Islam. In: Chr. Augustin, J. Wienand, Chr. Winkler (Hrsg.): Religiöser Pluralismus und Toleranz in Europa. Wiesbaden 2006, S. 123–186.
- Islam and Europe. Historic Interactions Re-evaluated. In: S. Kenan (Hrsg.): The Ottomans and Europe. Istanbul 2010, S. 387–397.
