= Tabrik =

Tabarik تَبَريك
- Village
- Location within Iran
- Coordinates: 37°11′15″N 58°43′10″E
- Country: Iran
- Province: Razavi Khorasan
- County: Quchan
- Bakhsh: Central
- Rural District: Shirin Darreh

Population (2006)
  - Total: 49
- Time zone: UTC+3:30 (IRST)
  - Summer (DST): UTC+4:30 (IRDT)

Tabarik (Persian: تبريك, also Romanized as Tabārīk; also known as Tabarrīk Javānlu and Tabrik-e Javanlu) is a village in Shirin Darreh Rural District, in the Central District of Quchan County, Razavi Khorasan Province, Iran. At the 2006 census, its population was 49, in 13 families.
