= Mu'ayyid al-Mulk =

Vizier of Seljuk sultan Berkyaruq and Muhammad Tapar

- Born: 1051; Khurasan
- Died: 1101 (aged 49–50)
- Occupation: Bureaucrat
- Years active: 1070s–1101
- Father: Nizam al-Mulk

Mu'ayyid al-Mulk (Persian: مؤيد الملک) was a Persian bureaucrat, who served as the vizier of the Seljuk sultan Berkyaruq (r. 1092–1105) from 1094 to 1095, and later vizier of the Seljuk prince and contender Muhammad I Tapar from 1099 to 1101. He was the most energetic and gifted of the sons of Nizam al-Mulk, with whom he neared in capability.

== Background ==
Born in 1051, Mu'ayyid al-Mulk was a son of Nizam al-Mulk, probably his second eldest. The family belonged to the aristocratic dehqan class of land-owning magnates, and was native to the eastern Iranian region of Khurasan.

== Biography ==
Map of the Seljuk Empire at the death of Malik-Shah I in 1092

Mu'ayyid al-Mulk spent the first ten years of Malik-Shah I's reign (r. 1072–1092) in Baghdad and Jazira, where he was the deputy of his father and the sultan in almost the same manner as that of a viceroy. In 1078, deadly riots took place in Baghdad due to religious differences between Islamic sects. Mu'ayyid al-Mulk, who was in the city at the time, quelled the riots with the help of the amid (Seljuk governor of Baghdad) and the prefect. After the downfall of Abu'l-Mahasin Sayyid al-Ru'asa' in 1083/4, Mu'ayyid al-Mulk succeeded him as the tughra'i (administrative secretary). However, he was not happy with this post, and thus asked to be dismissed. He subsequently went to Iraq, where he served as a diplomat. Mention of him in chronicles is thereafter omitted for the next 10 years. Some of Mu'izzi's poems imply that he was in the south-eastern Iranian region of Sistan and Khurasanian city of Herat.

Mu'ayyid al-Mulk was in Khurasan at the end of 1094, but fled to the capital Isfahan to join Berkyaruq, who appointed him as his vizier. He convinced or bribed the leading figures of Iraq and Khurasan who had joined Tutush I to return to the allegiance of Berkyaruq. He also played a key-role in the defeat of Tutush in 1095, at Dashilu, near Ray. He was reportedly personally thanked by Berkyaruq. However, he soon fell from grace. He had alienated Berkyaruq's mother Zubayda Khatun, who held great influence over her son. Furthermore, he had also bickered with his brother Fakhr al-Mulk over jewels left by their father. The latter offered Berkyaruq a great sum of riches in return for the post of vizier, which he accepted. Mu'ayyid al-Mulk was thus dismissed.

He soon entered into the service of Berkyaruq's half-brother Muhammad I Tapar, who appointed him as his vizier. Mu'ayyid al-Mulk made use of his newfound position to exact vengeance on his rivals, which was made easier because Muhammad had yet to reach adulthood (approximately 17 years old at the time). The Nizamiyya (supporters of Nizam al-Mulk) and the prominent families of Isfahan also joined Muhammad, stopping Berkyaruq from entering the city. The rebellion was launched from Muhammad's base at the city of Ganja in Arran, which had been given to him as a iqta' (land grant) by Berkyaruq back in 1093.

Muhammad's capture of Ray exposed the vulnerability of Berkyaruq's realm. Sa'd al-Dawla Gawhara'in, the shihna (military administrator) of Baghdad, soon joined Muhammad, which implies that the city was also added to his domain. Nevertheless, the five-year war continued to be indecisive, with Baghdad repeatedly changing hands. Even with the support of Sanjar (who despised Berkyaruq), Muhammad was unable to defeat his rival. In 1101, Muhammad's forces were defeated in a battle near Hamadan, which resulted in the capture of Mu'ayyid al-Mulk, who was taken to Berkyaruq, who had him personally killed.

== Legacy and assessment ==
Mu'ayyid al-Mulk was notably a patron of poets in both Arabic and Persian, and himself occasionally composed a rubaʿi in Persian, which is cited by the Persian poets Attar and Aufi.

== Sources ==
- Bosworth, C. E. (1968). "The Political and Dynastic History of the Iranian World (A.D. 1000–1217)". In Boyle, John Andrew (ed.). The Cambridge History of Iran: The Saljuq and Mongol Periods. Vol. 5. Cambridge: Cambridge University Press. pp. 1–202. ISBN 0-521-06936-X.
- Bosworth, C. E. (1988). "Barkīāroq". Encyclopaedia Iranica, Vol. III, Fasc. 8. pp. 800–801.
- Bosworth, C. E. (1997). "Ebn Dārost, Tāj al-Molk Abu'l-Ḡanā'em Marzbān". Encyclopaedia Iranica, Vol. VIII, Fasc. 1. pp. 12–13.
- Cahen, Cl (1960). "Barkyārūḳ". In Gibb, H. A. R.; Kramers, J. H.; Lévi-Provençal, E.; Schacht, J.; Lewis, B. & Pellat, Ch. (eds.). The Encyclopaedia of Islam, Second Edition. Volume I: A–B. Leiden: E. J. Brill. OCLC 495469456.
- Özaydın, Abdülkerim (2006). "Müeyyidülmülk". TDV Encyclopedia of Islam, Vol. 31 (Muhammedi̇yye – Münâzara) (in Turkish). Istanbul: Presidency of Religious Affairs, Centre for Islamic Studies. pp. 490–491. ISBN 978-975-389-458-6.
- Peacock, A. C. S. (2015). The Great Seljuk Empire. Edinburgh University Press. pp. 1–378. ISBN 9780748638260.
- Richards, D.S. (2014). The Annals of the Saljuq Turks: Selections from al-Kamil fi'l-Ta'rikh of Ibn al-Athir. Routledge. ISBN 9781317832546.
- Tetley, Gillies (2008). The Ghaznavid and Seljuk Turks: Poetry as a Source for Iranian History. Routledge. ISBN 9781134084388.
- Tor, D. G. (2016). "Rayy and the Religious History of the Seljūq Period". Journal of Ancient History. 93 (2). De Gruyter: 374–402. doi:10.1515/islam-2016-0033.
- Yavari, Neguin (2015). "Neẓām-al-Molk". Encyclopaedia Iranica.
