= Muhammad ibn Ali Rawandi =

Persian historian and calligrapher

- محمد بن علی راوندی
- Born: Rawand, near Kashan, Persia (now Iran)
- Died: After 1207
- Occupations: Historian, Calligrapher

Academic work
- Era: Medieval Islamic Period
- Main interests: History of the Seljuk Empire
- Notable works: Rahat al-sudur wa ayat al-surur

Muhammad ibn Ali Rawandi (Persian: محمد بن علی راوندی; died after 1207), was a Persian historian who wrote the Rahat al-sudur wa ayat al-surur during the fall of the Great Seljuk Empire and the subsequent invasion by the Kharwarzmian empire.

The only source that gives details about Rawandi's life is his own book. He was from a scholarly family from Rawand near Kashan, and studied Hanafi fiqh in Hamadan from 1174 to 1184. As a calligrapher, Rawandi was brought to court to craft a Quran for Toghrul III and gained the sultan's favor. After Toghrul's incarceration, Rawandi gained the patronage of Shihab al-Din al-Kashani, who urged him to write the Rahat al-sudur. Rawandi had intended to dedicate his book to Süleymanshah II, but dedicated it to Kaykhusraw I, following the latter's accession as Sultan of Rum. Later the Rahat al-sudur was translated into Turkish during the reign of Murad II.

Rawandi died after 1207.

== Modern era ==
In 1921, the Rahat al-sudur was published by Muhammad Iqbal (died 1938). It was recognized by Iqbal, Edward G. Browne and Mirza Muhammad Qazwini as a source in other texts, namely Jami' al-tawarikh of Rashid al-Din Hamadani (died 1318), Rawdat al-safa of Mirkhvand (died 1498) and Tarikh-i guzida of Hamdallah Mustawfi (died after 1339/40).

== Sources ==
- Bosworth, C.E., ed. (2001). The History of the Seljuq Turks: from the Jāmi al-Tawārīkh : an Ilkhanid Adaptation of the Saljuq nama. Translated by Luther, Kenneth Allin. Curzon Press.
- Durand-Guédy, David (2013). Turko-Mongol Rulers, Cities and City Life. Brill. ISBN 978-90-04-25700-9.
- Hillenbrand, Carole (1995). "Rāwandī". In Bosworth, C. E.; van Donzel, E.; Heinrichs, W. P. & Lecomte, G. (eds.). The Encyclopaedia of Islam, Second Edition. Volume VIII: Ned–Sam. Leiden: E. J. Brill. ISBN 978-90-04-09834-3.
- Özgüdenli, Osman G. (2017). "Gıyaseddin Keyhüsrev I". In Fleet, Kate; Krämer, Gudrun; Matringe, Denis; Nawas, John; Rowson, Everett (eds.). Encyclopaedia of Islam (3rd ed.). Brill Online. ISSN 1873-9830.
- Peacock, A.C.S.; Yildiz, Sara Nur, eds. (2013). The Seljuks of Anatolia: Court and Society in the Medieval Middle East. I.B.Tauris. ISBN 978-0857733467.
