= Malik-Shah I =

Sultan of the Seljuk Empire from 1072 to 1092

- Amir al-Mu'minin; Father of Conquests; Sultan of the East and the West
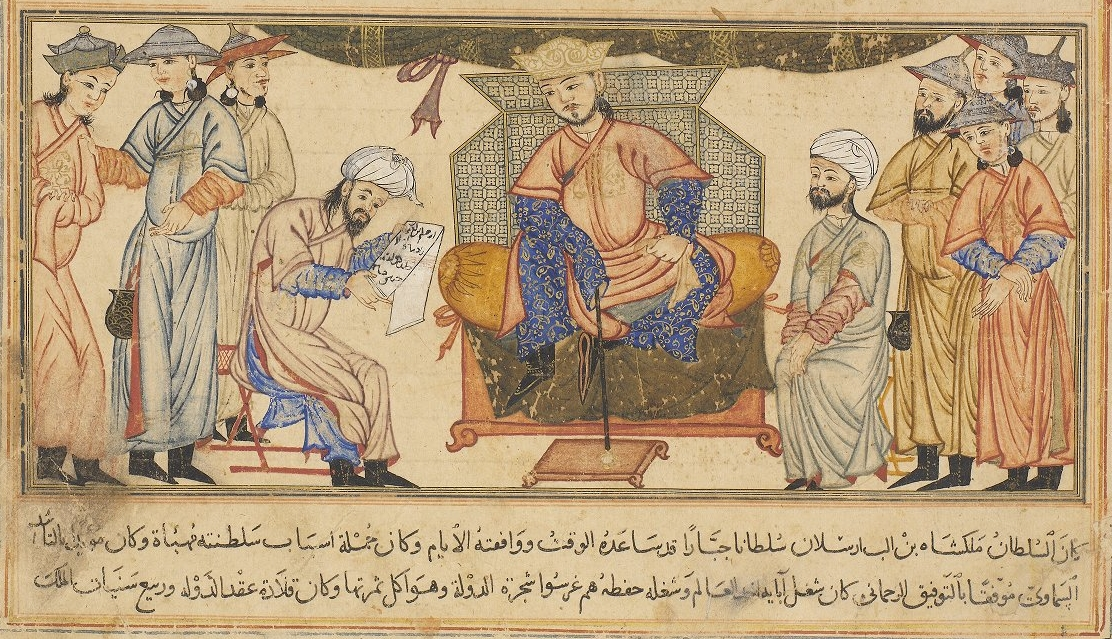
- Investiture scene of Malik-Shah I, from the 14th-century book Jami' al-tawarikh

Sultan of the Great Seljuk Empire
- Reign: 15 December 1072 – 19 November 1092
- Predecessor: Alp Arslan
- Successor: Mahmud I
- Born: 16 August 1055; Isfahan, Seljuk Empire
- Died: 19 November 1092 (aged 37); Baghdad, Seljuk Empire
- Burial: Tomb of Nizam al-Mulk, Isfahan
- Spouse: Terken Khatun; Zubayda Khatun; Taj Safariyya Khatun (concubine)
- Issue: Berkyaruq; Muhammad I Tapar; Ahmad Sanjar; Mahmud I; Ahmed; Dawud; Tughril; Amir Khumarin; Abdul Qasim; Other two sons; Mah Malek Khatun; Sitara Khatun; Terken Khatun; Salkim Khatun; Safiya Khatun; Gawhar Khatun; Ismah Khatun; Other three daughters
- House: Seljuk Dynasty
- Father: Alp Arslan
- Mother: Safariyya Khatun (possibly)
- Religion: Sunni Islam

Malik-Shah I (Persian: ملک شاه یکم) was the third sultan of the Seljuk Empire from 1072 to 1092, under whom the sultanate reached the zenith of its power and influence. During his youth, he spent his time participating in the campaigns of his father Alp Arslan, along with the latter's vizier Nizam al-Mulk. During one such campaign in 1072, Alp Arslan was fatally wounded and died only a few days later. After that, Malik-Shah was crowned as the new sultan of the empire, but the succession was contested by his uncle Qavurt. Although Malik-Shah was the nominal head of the Seljuk state, Nizam al-Mulk held near absolute power during his reign. Malik-Shah spent the rest of his reign waging war against the Karakhanids to the east and establishing order in the Caucasus.

== Etymology ==
Although he was known by several names, he was mostly known as "Malik-Shah", a combination of the Arabic word malik (king) and the Persian word shah (which also means king).

== Early life ==
Malik-Shah was born on 16 August 1055 and spent his youth in Isfahan. According to the 12th-century Persian historian Muhammad bin Ali Rawandi, Malik-Shah had fair skin, was tall and somewhat bulky. In 1064, Malik-Shah, only 9 years old by then, along with Nizam al-Mulk, the Persian vizier of the Empire, took part in Alp Arslan's campaign in the Caucasus. The same year, Malik-Shah was married to Terken Khatun, the daughter of the Karakhanid khan Ibrahim Tamghach-Khan. In 1066, Alp Arslan arranged a ceremony near Merv, where he appointed Malik-Shah as his heir and also granted him Isfahan as a fief.

In 1071, Malik-Shah took part in the Syrian campaign of his father, and stayed in Aleppo when his father fought the Byzantine emperor Romanos IV Diogenes at Manzikert. In 1072, Malik-Shah and Nizam al-Mulk accompanied Alp-Arslan during his campaign in Transoxiana against the Karakhanids. However, Alp-Arslan was badly wounded during his expedition, and Malik-Shah shortly took over the army. Alp-Arslan died some days later, and Malik-Shah was declared as the new sultan of the empire.

== Campaigns and Battles ==
=== Campaign in the Northwest (1064) ===
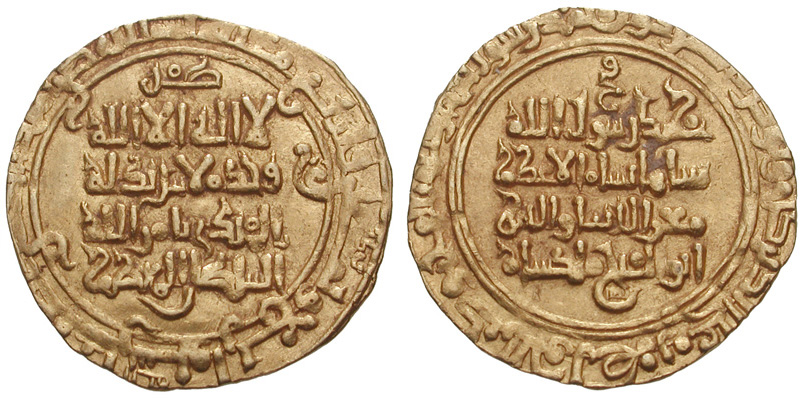
Dinar of Malik Shah I, AH 465-485.

Malik-Shah joined his father Alp Arslan's expedition to the northwest in 1064. He took part in the capture of castles in Georgia and Armenia together with his father Alp Arslan. He advanced along the Aras River with the army under the command of Malik-Shah. He captured many castles and cities in the region, especially Meryemnişin, Byurakan, Hagios Georgios and Surmari. During this campaign, Malik-Shah also participated in the Siege of Ani (1064).

=== Other Campaigns and Battles He Participated in During His Şehzade Period ===
In addition to the Campaign in the Northwest, Sultan Malik-Shah also participated in his father Sultan Alp Arslan's campaigns in the Campaign in Northern Syria and Anatolia, and the Campaign in Turkestan (1072), and fought in these campaigns during.

=== Battle of Kerj Abu Dulaf (1073) ===
However, right after Malik-Shah's accession, his uncle Qavurt claimed the throne for himself and sent Malik-Shah a message which said: "I am the eldest brother, and you are a youthful son; I have the greater right to my brother Alp-Arslan's inheritance." Malik-Shah then replied by sending the following message: "A brother does not inherit when there is a son." This message enraged Qavurt, who thereafter occupied Isfahan. In 1073, the Battle of Kerj Abu Dulaf took place near Hamadan, lasting three days. Qavurt was accompanied by his seven sons, and his army consisted of Turkmens, while the army of Malik-Shah consisted of ghulams ("military slaves") and contingents of Kurdish and Arab troops.

During the battle, the Turks of Malik-Shah's army mutinied against him, but he nevertheless managed to defeat and capture Qavurt. Qavurt then begged for mercy and in return promised to retire to Oman. However, Nizam al-Mulk declined the offer, claiming that sparing him was an indication of weakness. After some time, Qavurt was strangled to death with a bowstring, while two of his sons were blinded. After having dealt with that problem, Malik-Shah appointed Qutlugh-Tegin as the governor of Fars and Sav-Tegin as the governor of Kerman.

=== Campaign in Transoxiana (1073) ===
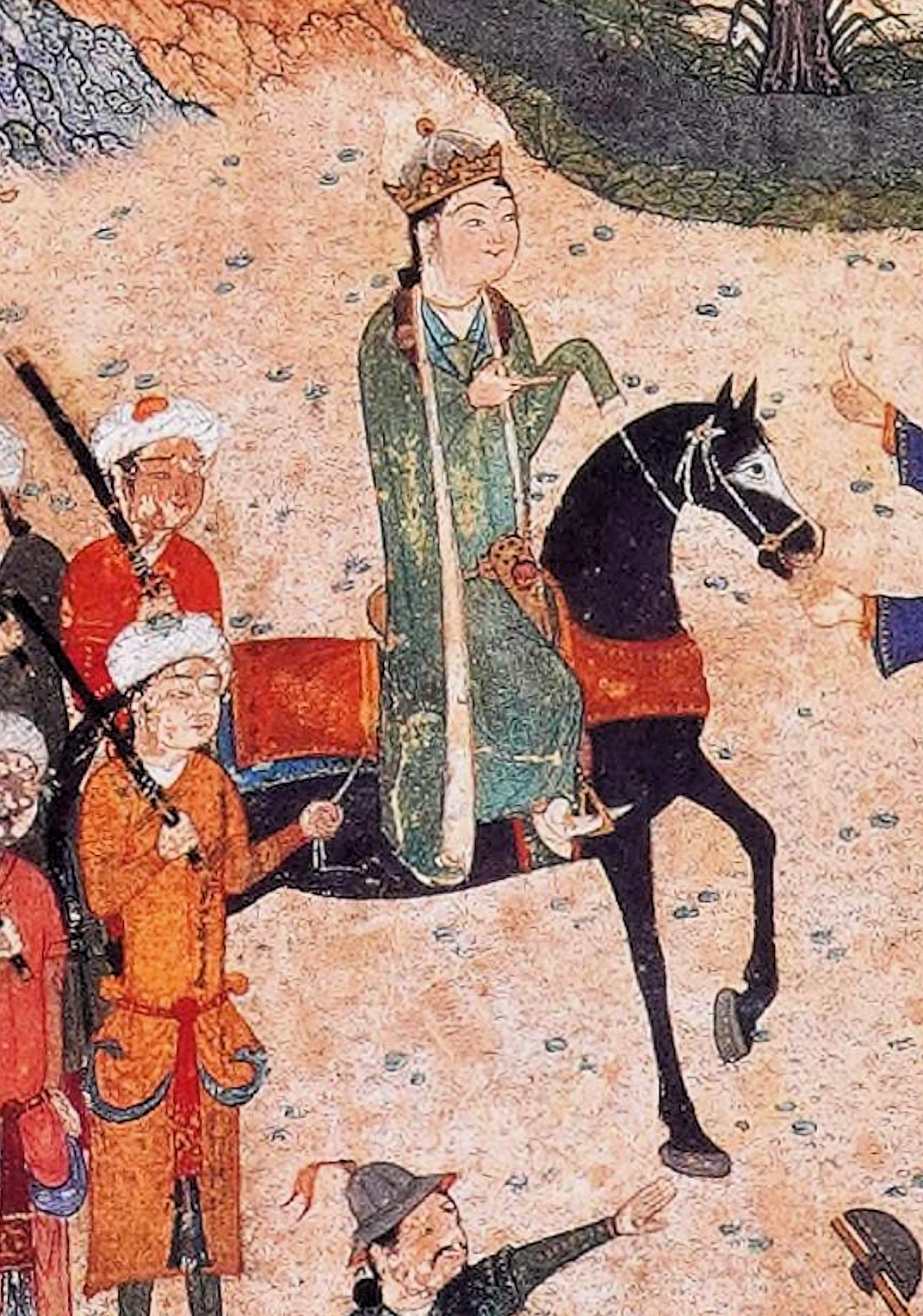
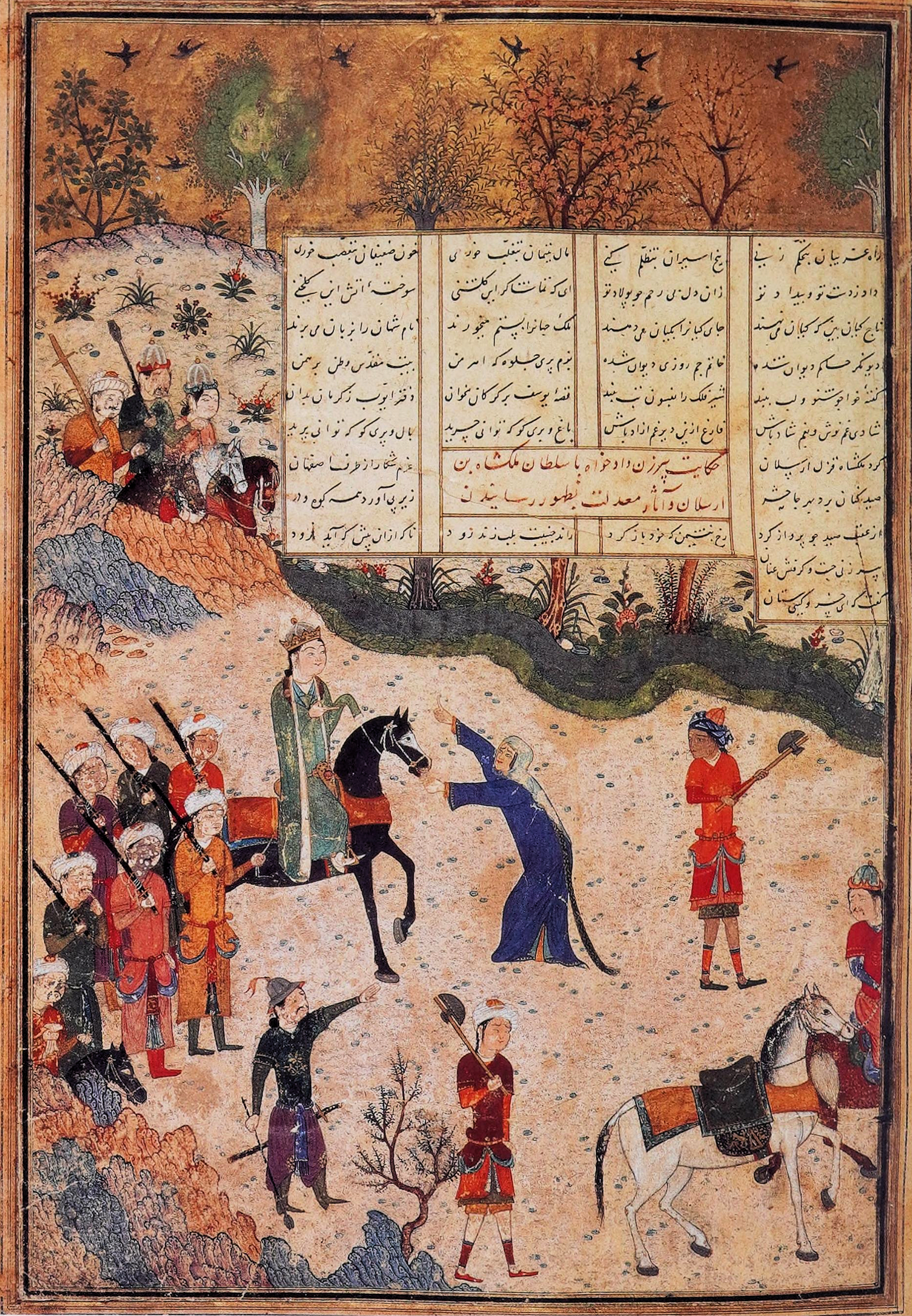
Sultan Malikshah ibn Arslan accosted by an old woman. Khamsah by Khvaju Kirmani (BL Add.18113), Jalayirid manuscript, 1396. Although the story relates to Sultan Malikshah, this is an actual depiction of the Jalayirid ruler Sultan Ahmad who commissioned the painting.

Malik-Shah then turned his attention towards the Kara-Khanids, who had after the death of Alp Arslan invaded Tukharistan, which was ruled by Malik-Shah's brother Ayaz, who was unable to repel the Kara-Khanids and was killed by them. Malik-Shah went on a campaign to Transoxiana with his army in 1073. Malik-Shah finally managed to repel the Kara-Khanids and after Balkh and Herat, he headed towards Termez and captured Termez, giving the key of the city to Sav-Tegin. Malik-Shah then appointed his other brother Shihab al-Din Tekish as the ruler of Tukharistan and Balkh. During the same period, the Ghaznavid ruler Ibrahim was seizing Seljuk territory in northern Khorasan, but was defeated by Malik-Shah, who then made peace with the latter and gave his daughter Gawhar Khatun in marriage to Ibrahim's son Mas'ud III.

=== Campaign in Kerman ===
In 1074, following the events that occurred during the reign of Sultan-Shah (son of Qavurt), who ascended to the throne of Kerman as governor of Kerman, Sultan Malik-Shah decided to launch an expedition against Kerman. Entering Kerman territory with his army, Malik-Shah laid siege to Bardsir, Kerman's largest city and capital, but refrained from fighting after the Sultan-Shah begged for forgiveness. Malik-Shah only demolished one of the bastions of Kuhan, one of Bardsir's castles. After leaving Sultan-Shah as governor of Kerman, he returned to Isfahan, the capital of the Great Seljuk Empire.

=== Campaign in Georgia (1075-76) ===
During George II's reign, some disagreements and internal turmoil arose. Consequently, Malik-Shah I launched an expedition against Georgia. Malik-Shah I came to Kartli with his army and captured some of the fortresses located there. Malik-Shah I later took Ganja from Fadlun and gave the administration of the region to Savtegin, then returned to his capital with his army.

=== First Campaign against the Qarmatian ===
At the request of the Abbasid caliph Muqtadi, Sultan Malik-Shah I decided to launch an expedition against the Qarmatians. In 1075, Malik-Shah sent an army under the command of Hajib Kichkine against the Qarmatians. Before embarking on the campaign, Hajib Kiçkine made several agreements and formed an alliance. The Seljuk army under the command of Hajib Kiçkine left Isfahan and arrived in Basra. Shortly thereafter, they were joined by Gevherayin the Military Governor's of Baghdad and Seljuk army set out for Qatif. During this journey, the Qays and Qubas tribes in the region launched plundering attacks against the Seljuk army. In the ensuing battle between the two sides, the Seljuk army was victorious. When the Seljuk army approached Qatif, he sent a message to the city's ruler, Yahya ibn Abbas. However, Yahya ibn Abbas, citing his war with the Qays and Qubas tribes as justifications, refused to honor previous agreements and threatened the Seljuks. Consequently, Yahya ibn Abbas was defeated in the ensuing battle. Later, Yahya ibn Abbas made an agreement with the Qays and Qubas tribes, attacked the Seljuk army, and plundered its supplies and logistics. The hardship left Hajib Kiçkine and the Seljuk army weakened. A sudden raid by Yahya ibn Abbas and his allies later disintegrated the Seljuk army under Hajib Kiçkine. The Seljuk forces retreating towards Basra returned without the opportunity to fight the Qarmatians.

=== Second Campaign against the Qarmatian ===
Following the failure of Hajib Kiçkine, Sultan Malik-Shah I assigned a 7,000-strong Seljuk army under the command of Artuk Bey to launch an expedition against the Qarmatians. The Seljuk army under Artuk Bey first marched to Qatif. Hearing of the Seljuks arrival, Yahya ibn Abbas fled to Bahrain, and the Seljuks captured Qatif. The Seljuks then attacked the Qarmatians in Ahsa and besieged them in their castle. After the Qarmatians requested peace and an agreement was reached, Artuk Bey lifted the siege. Following this, he launched a successful attack on the Qarmatians in Bahrain and brought them under his control. Following these campaigns, Artuk Bey went to Baghdad, leaving a 200-man detachment under his brother Alpkuş as his proxy. Supported by the Arab tribes of Azd and Amir Rebia, the Qarmatians, emboldened by Artuk Bey's departure from Ahsa with a large portion of his army, attacked the Seljuks and their allies. In a battle fought between the two sides near Beyberrahbeteyn, the Qarmatians were defeated. The Seljuk allies captured the fortress of Ahsa, but they refused to allow the Seljuk army to enter. After this defeat, the Qarmatians launched an attack with their allies. In the battle between the two sides near Ahsa, the Qarmatians and their allies were defeated and suffered heavy losses. A dispute later arose between Abdullah ibn Ali and Alpkuş. Abdullah ibn Ali killed Alpkuş. Artuk Bey, upon hearing of his brother's death, marched with his army and besieged the fortress of Ahsa, where Abdullah ibn Ali was stationed. After a fierce siege, Artuk captured Abdullah ibn Ali's son in exchange for his brother and lifted the siege.

=== Campaign in Anatolia (1078) ===
Suleiman-Shah took the side of Sultan Malik-Shah against the independence activities of his brother Mansur and asked for help from Sultan Malik-Shah. Upon this, Sultan Malik-Shah dispatched the Seljuk army under the command of Emir Porsuk to restore order in Anatolia. Emir Porsuk engaged in a struggle with Mansur, and as a result, Mansur was killed by Porsuk. Suleiman-Shah, as a Seljuk vassal, became the sole sultan of the Sultanate of Rum.

=== Campaign in Georgia (1078-79) ===
Savtegin went on a campaign against the George II. He was defeated in the battle near Partskhisi and retreated. Thereupon, Malik-Shah I organized a second campaign against Georgia in 1078-1079. Malik-Shah, who entered Georgia, invaded the Somkheth region with his army, captured Samshvilde and put things in order, and returned, leaving new forces for Savtegin. After Malik-Shah returned, Savtegin moved against the Georgians, but George II defeated him once again in the battle near Partskhisi. After Savtegin was defeated by the Georgians, Malik-Shah sent Emir Ahmed to Georgia. Ahmed defeated the Georgians and captured Kars, Erzurum, Oltu and some cities subject to Byzantium. The following year, the Seljuks captured Şavşat, Adjara, Kartli, Ardanuç and the areas up to Trabzon. George II went to Isfahan and accepted to be a vassal of Malik-Shah.

=== Campaign in Khorasan (1081) ===
In 1081, while inspecting the army in the city of Rey, Sultan Malik-Shah dismissed 7,000 Armenians who had entered the army disguised as Turks. These Armenians went to Malik-Shah's brother Tekish and entered his service. Tekish, strengthened by this situation, rebelled. During this rebellion, Tekish captured Marw al-Rudh, Shāhijān or Marw al-Shāhijān, and Termez. News of Tekish's rebellion reached Malik-Shah, and Malik-Shah led a campaign to the region. Meanwhile, Tekish was preparing to capture Nishapur, but Malik-Shah arrived in the city before him and took it over. Upon learning of Malik-Shah's arrival, Tekish retreated to Termez. Malik-Shah came to Termez and laid siege to the city. Realizing that he would be defeated, Tekish came to Malik-Shah and begged for forgiveness. Malik-Shah forgave his brother and did not punish him.

=== Campaign in Herat ===
Toghan-Shah, the governor of Herat in the Great Seljuk Empire, rebelled against his brother Malik-Shah. In response to this rebellion, Malik-Shah launched an expedition against his brother. In the ensuing struggle between Malik-Shah and Toghan-Shah, Toghan-Shah was defeated and captured. Malik-Shah later imprisoned his brother in the Isfahan Castle.

=== Campaign against the Marwanids ===
The mistreatment of Muslims in Marwanid-held lands and Fakhr al-Dawla's persuasion of Sultan Malik-Shah to launch an expedition into the region led to the Seljuk Empire's campaign against the Marwanids, a vassal of the Seljuk Empire. The Seljuk army sent by Sultan Malik-Shah to the region first successfully attacked the headquarters of Sharaf al-Dawla Muslim, the ruler of Mosul and a vassal of the Seljuk Empire who had come to support the Marwanids. Sharaf al-Dawla Muslim and the Marwanid Mansur escaped this attack and fled to Diyarbakır. After their escape, their remaining soldiers escaped without much resistance, but some were captured by the Seljuk forces. Taking advantage of the internal turmoil within the Seljuk army, Sharaf al-Dawla Muslim reached an agreement with Artuk Bey and went to Raqqa. The Seljuk army then laid siege to Meyyafarikin and Diyarbakır. The Seljuks captured all the lands belonging to the Marwanids, especially Diyarbakır, Meyyafarikin, Ahlat, Cizre, Bitlis, Siirt, Erzen, and Hasankeyf.

=== Campaign against the Uqaylid ===
Sultan Malik-Shah was enraged by Sharaf al-Dawla Muslim's support for the Marwanids. He granted his lands to Fakhr al-Dawla's son, Amid al-Dawla. Malik-Shah launched a campaign against the Uqaylids to seize Sharaf al-Dawla Muslim's lands. The Seljuks captured Mosul. Sharaf ud-Dawla Muslim asked for forgiveness from Malik-Shah. Meanwhile, the rebellion of Malik-Shah's brother, Tekish, led Malik-Shah to pardon him and return his former territories. Sharaf al-Dawla later formed an alliance against Malik-Shah with Artuk Bey, Tutush, and the Fatimids, but this alliance initiative failed and disintegrated after Sharaf al-Dawla lost a battle with Suleiman Shah and was killed.

=== Campaign in Khorasan (1086) ===
The governor of Khorasan, Shihab al-Din Tekish, took advantage of Sultan Malik-Shah’s being in Mosul due to the campaign against the Marwanids and rebelled. Tekish occupied the cities of Merv and Sarakhs and laid siege to Nishapur. Later, when he received news that Nizam al-Mulk was coming with an army, he lifted the siege and retreated. Malik-Shah went on a campaign against Khorasan in 1086. Malik-Shah laid siege to the castle of Venec where Tekish was located. Tekish, who was captured alive, had his eyes gouged out and was imprisoned.

=== Campaign in Caucasus (1086) ===
After Savtegin's death, Ismail, the governor of Azerbaijan, succeeded him. Shaddadi Emir Fadl III, seeking to capitalize on this change of government, rebelled. Consequently, Malik-Shah launched an expedition against the Caucasus with his army in 1086. This campaign strengthened Seljuk rule in the region. Ganja, where Fadl III was based, was besieged and captured. Fadl III was taken prisoner. During this expedition, a Byzantine ambassador appeared before Malik-Shah with gifts. Malik-Shah then continued campaign to the Black Sea coast. As a result of this expedition, he strengthened his control over the emirs, kings and princes in the region. After this expedition, George II went to Isfahan again in 1088 and appeared before Malik-Shah I. When George agreed to pay taxes and become a Seljuk vassal, Sultan Malik-Shah gave him back Kakheti and Hereti.

=== Campaign in Northern Syria (1086) ===
As a result of the struggle for dominance among the emirs, Malik-Shah decided to organize a campaign to Northern Syria. Malik-Shah moved towards Northern Syria with his army in 1086. Malik-Shah and the army under his command, captured Aleppo, Antioch, Edessa, Harran and Qal'at Ja'bar Castle during his Northern Syria campaign. Later, they captured Manbij, Shayzar, Latakia, Kafertab and Apamea.

=== Campaign in Transoxiana (1087) ===
In 1087, due to internal unrest in Turkestan, Malik-Shah decided to organize another expedition to Transoxiana. Malik-Shah moved with his army to the Transoxiana region of Turkestan. He captured many castles belonging to the Kara-Khanids, especially Bukhara, Samarkand, Balasagun, Isfijab and Kashgar. When Malik-Shah arrived at Uzkand with his army, the Eastern Kara-Khanid ruler Hasan ibn Suleiman came to Malik-Shah and agreed to be his vassal and pay taxes. In addition, the Western Kara-Khanid ruler Ahmed was captured by the Seljuks after the capture of Samarkand, and Malik-Shah appointed one of his men as the Seljuk governor of the Western Karakhanid country.

=== Campaign in Anatolia (1088) ===
Around 1088, Sultan Malik-Shah sent a 50,000 people Seljuk army under the command of Emir Porsuk to Anatolia to take control. After undertaking construction activities in Anatolia, Emir Porsuk marched on Nicaea around 1090. Meanwhile, Nicaea was under siege by the Byzantine Empire. Upon hearing of Porsuk's arrival with his army, the Byzantine commander lifted the siege and retreated to a position 22 kilometers from Nicaea, later returning to Constantinople. It wasn't just the Byzantine commander who received news of Porsuk's arrival with a large army; Abu'l-Qasim, the steward of the Sultanate of Rum and resident in Nicaea, also received this news. Byzantine Emperor Alexios summoned Abu'l-Qasim to Constantinople and formed an alliance against Porsuk. While Abu'l-Qasim was in Constantinople, the Byzantine navy attacked and captured İzmit. Abu'l-Qasim, who learned of this during his journey to Nicaea, showed no reaction to the issue of İzmit due to Porsuk's siege of Nicaea. Porsuk besieged Nicaea for nearly three months, but was unable to take it. Realizing he could no longer resist Porsuk, Abu'l-Qasim requested assistance from the Byzantine emperor. Emperor Alexios sent a Byzantine army to Nicaea to aid him. When the Byzantine army arrived in Nicaea, Emir Porsuk, seeing the Emperor's banner, assumed that Emperor Alexios had arrived himself, lifted the siege, and retreated.

=== Campaign in Transoxiana (1089) ===
After Malik-Shah's final campaign in Transoxiana, some Turkic tribes in the region rebelled against Malik-Shah's failure to comply with certain rules of Turkish customs and summoned Yakub Tegin, a member of the Kara-Khanid dynasty, to Samarkand. News of the rebellion compelled Malik-Shah to launch another campaign against Transoxiana. When Malik-Shah marched on Samarkand, Yakub Tegin abandoned his Fergana base and fled to At-Bashy. Malik-Shah attacked Samarkand and conquered the city a second time. Malik-Shah then set out to capture Yakub Tegin, advancing as far as the Land of the Nomads (Bilad al-Harqawat). Upon hearing of Malik-Shah's arrival, the ruler of Talas came to Malik-Shah's bow and offered his obedience. Malik-Shah ordered Hasan Khan, the Eastern Kara-Khanid ruler and Seljuk vassal, to capture and bring his brother Yakub Tegin. When Hasan Khan was reluctant to comply, Malik-Shah marched on Özkend (Uzkend) and captured the city. Hasan Khan of the Eastern Kara-Khanid Khanate, captured Yakub Tegin. However, Yakub Tegin was freed following the rebellion of Tughril ibn Inal of the Kara-Khanid Dynasty. Knowing that dealing with two rebels would be difficult, Malik-Shah made a deal with Yakub Tegin and used him against Tughril. Following these developments, Malik-Shah returned to his capital, Isfahan. Malik-Shah reinstated some of the Turkestan Khans he had captured during his campaign in 1087. Thanks to this campaign, the entire Turkistan Region, up to the borders of China (Its borders in 1089), was brought under Seljuk rule in 1089. (Note: A map showing the largest borders of the Great Seljuk Empire)

=== Campaign in Anatolia (1090-1091) ===
Following Porsuk's failure, Sultan Malik-Shah sent Emir Bozan to Anatolia around 1090-1091. Although Emir Bozan laid siege to Nicaea, he lifted the siege without achieving any results. Later, Abu'l-Qasim went to Isfahan and requested a meeting with Sultan Malik-Shah, but Sultan Malik-Shah refused, telling Abu'l-Qasim that he should meet with Emir Bozan. When Abu'l-Qasim approached Emir Bozan, he was killed by Bozan's soldiers. As a result of Emir Porsuk and Emir Bozan's campaigns, a large portion of Anatolia was brought under the control of the Great Seljuk Empire.

=== Conquest of Yemen (1092) ===
During his time in Baghdad, Malik-Shah assigned Gevher-Ayin and Emir Çubuk to establish permanent control over the Hejaz and seize Yemen. Emir Türkeş and Yarınkuş were appointed commanders of the army prepared by Malik-Shah's order. When news of Malik-Shah's presence in Baghdad reached the Hejaz, khutbahs were again delivered in the Hejaz in the name of the Seljuk sultan and the Abbasid caliph. Following this, the Seljuk army captured Yemen and Aden.

=== Campaign in Anatolia ===
In his book "Turkey in the Time of the Seljuks (Turkish: Selçuklular Zamanında Türkiye)," medieval historian Osman Turan states that some primary sources indicate that Malik-Shah personally campaigned in Anatolia. After making conquests in Anatolia, especially in Konya, Aksaray, Kayseri, and Antakya, Malik-Shah laid siege to Constantinople, imposed a tax of 1,000,000 gold coins on the Byzantine Empire, ceded the conquered territories to Suleiman Shah, and ordered the conquest of Egypt and the Maghreb before returning. However, Osman Turan views this information, derived from primary sources, with skepticism due to the lack of sufficient data. Some historians who examine these events also agree with Osman Turan's views. Some historians also mention this situation.

=== Domestic policy and Ismailis ===
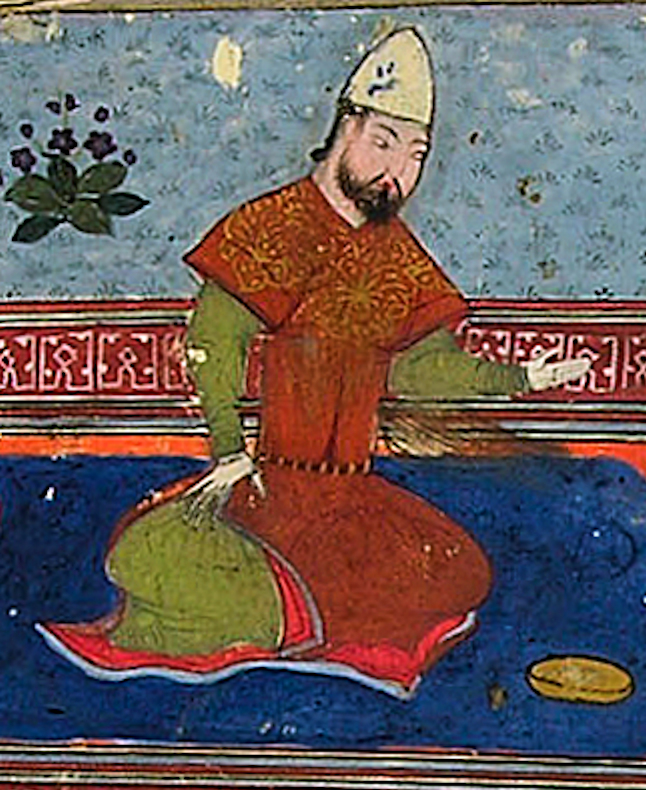
Miniature of Malik-Shah I. Jami al-Tawarikh (1317-1425)

In 1092, Nizam al-Mulk was assassinated near Sihna, on the road to Baghdad, by a man disguised as a Sufi. As the assassin was immediately cut down by Nizam's bodyguard, it became impossible to establish with certainty who had sent him. One theory had it that he was an Assassin, since these assassins regularly made attempts on the lives of Seljuk officials and rulers during the 11th century. Another theory had it that the attack had been instigated by Malik-Shah, who may have grown tired of his overmighty vizier. After Nizam al-Mulk's death, Malik-Shah appointed another Persian named Taj al-Mulk Abu'l Ghana'im as his vizier. Malik-Shah then went to Baghdad and decided to depose al-Muqtadi and sent him the following message: "You must relinquish Baghdad to me, and depart to any land you choose." This was because Malik-Shah wanted to appoint his grandson (or nephew) Ja'far as the new caliph.

The Sultan had a good relationship with the Shias at large except for the Ismailis of Hassan ibn Sabbah. Followers of Sabbah managed to occupy the Alamut fortress near Qazvin, and the army under the command of the emir Arslan-Tash, sent by Malik Shah, could not recapture it. The Sultan's ghilman, Kizil Sarug, besieged the Daru fortress in Kuhistan, but ceased hostilities in connection with the death of Malik Shah on November 19, 1092, possibly due to poisoning.

== Death and aftermath ==
Malik-Shah died on 19 November 1092 while he was hunting. He was most likely poisoned by the caliph or the supporters of Nizam al-Mulk. Under the orders of Terken Khatun, Malik-Shah's body was taken back to Isfahan, where it was buried in a madrasa.

Upon his death, the Seljuk Empire fell into chaos, as rival successors and regional governors carved up their empire and waged war against each other. The situation within the Seljuk lands was further complicated by the beginning of the First Crusade, which detached large portions of Syria and Palestine from Muslim control in 1098 and 1099. The success of the First Crusade is at least in part attributable to the political confusion which resulted from Malik-Shah's death.

== Family ==
Malikshah had many wives and concubines and multiple children born from them. Principal wives were:

1. Terken Khatun (b. 1053, m. 1065. d. 1094) – daughter of Tamghach Khan Ibrahim
  - Dawud (d. 1082)
  - Ahmed (1077–1088)
  - Mahmud (b. 1087–88)
  - A son (d. childhood, buried in Ray)
  - Mah Malek Khatun (m. 1082 to Al-Muqtadi)
2. Zubayda Khatun (b. 1056 d. 1099) – daughter of Yaquti son of Chaghri Beg
  - Berkyaruq
  - Gawhar Khatun (m. Mas'ud III of Ghazni)

Concubines:

1. Taj al-Din Khatun Safariyya (also known as Bushali, d. 1121, Merv)
  - Muhammad Tapar
  - Ahmad Sanjar
  - A son (d. childhood, buried in Ray)
  - Ismah Khatun (m. 1109 to Al-Mustazhir)
  - Sitara Khatun (m. Garshasp II, son of Ali ibn Faramurz)

Unknown mothers:

  - Tughril
  - Amir Khumarin (an albino)

  - Salkim Khatun (m. Qarin III, son of Shahriyar IV, m. Ali I)
  - Safiya Khatun (m. Taj al-Din Abu'l-Fazl Nasr bin Halef, ruler of Sistan)
  - A daughter (m. Sultan Shah, son of Qavurt)
  - A daughter (m. Ispahbud Taj al-Mulk Mardavij, son of Ali ibn Mardavij)
  - Terken Khatun (m. Kara-Khanid Muhammad Arslan Khan (r. 1102 – 1129)
    - Rukn al-Din Mahmud Khan (r. 1132–1144), succeeded Sanjar in Khurasan.
  - A daughter (m. 1101–02 Abdulaziz bin Omar bin Maza, governor of Bukhara)

== Legacy ==
The 18th century English historian Edward Gibbon wrote of him:

On his father's death the inheritance was disputed by an uncle, a cousin, and a brother: they drew their cimeters, and assembled their followers; and the triple victory of Malek Shah established his own reputation and the right of primogeniture. In every age, and more especially in Asia, the thirst of power has inspired the same passions, and occasioned the same disorders; but, from the long series of civil war, it would not be easy to extract a sentiment more pure and magnanimous than is contained in the saying of the Turkish prince. On the eve of the battle, he performed his devotions at Thous, before the tomb of the Imam Riza. As the sultan rose from the ground, he asked his vizier Nizam, who had knelt beside him, what had been the object of his secret petition: "That your arms may be crowned with victory," was the prudent, and most probably the sincere, answer of the minister. "For my part," replied the generous Malek, "I implored the Lord of Hosts that he would take from me my life and crown, if my brother be more worthy than myself to reign over the Moslems." The favourable judgment of heaven was ratified by the caliph; and for the first time, the sacred title of Commander of the Faithful was communicated to a Barbarian. But this Barbarian, by his personal merit, and the extent of his empire, was the greatest prince of his age.

== Personality ==
Malik-Shah displayed substantial interest in science, art and literature. The Isfahan Observatory or Malikshah Observatory was constructed during his reign, closing shortly after his death in 1092. It was from the work at the observatory that the Jalali Calendar was adopted. He thought highly of the art of architecture as well, as he enjoyed building new and splendid mosques in his capital, Isfahan. He was religiously tolerant which is supported by the fact that during his reign, subjects of the Seljuk Empire enjoyed internal peace and religious tolerance. Malik-Shah also showed lenience towards exquisite poetry as his reign is also memorable for the poetry of Omar Khayyam.

Despite being arguably the most powerful monarch of his era, it is believed that Malik-Shah was unpretentious and modest. The legend has it that during the years that were hugely successful for Seljuks on all fronts, Malik-Shah, overwhelmed by the imperial might of his dynasty, used to climb to the top of a hill and say the following: "Oh Almighty God, I will somehow cope with the problem of hunger, please save me from the threat of abundance".

Malik Shah did not spend as much time on campaign as his prominent predecessor Tughril or his father Alp Arslan did. Isfahan became securely established as his chief city of residence, although in the latter years of his rule Malik Shah preferred to winter in Baghdad. Whereas Alp Arslan had spent just over a year out of his decade-long reign in Isfahan, Malik Shah resided there for more than half of his rule. Isfahan also served as the burial site of Malik Shah, his descendants, as well as celebrated bureaucrats of the sultanate like Nizam al-Mulk. Malik Shah's decision of residing in a capital far away from the centers of Turkmen settlement around Merv, Rayy, Hamadan, and Azerbaijan could well be explained by the increasing distance between him and his nomadic subjects.

== Sources ==
- Bosworth, C. E. (1968). "The Political and Dynastic History of the Iranian World (A.D. 1000–1217)". In Frye, R. N. (ed.). The Cambridge History of Iran, Volume 5: The Saljuq and Mongol periods. Cambridge: Cambridge University Press. pp. 1–202. ISBN 0-521-06936-X.
- Bosworth, C. Edmund (2002). "GOWHAR ḴĀTUN". Encyclopaedia Iranica, Vol. XI, Fasc. 2. London et al. p. 179.
- Bosworth, C. E (1995). The Later Ghaznavids: Splendour and Decay: The Dynasty in Afghanistan and Northern India 1040–1186. Munshiram Manoharlal Publishers Private, Limited. ISBN 9788121505772.
- Durand-Guédy, David (2012). "MALEKŠĀH". Encyclopaedia Iranica.
- Lambton, A.K.S. (1988). Continuity and Change in Medieval Persia. Bibliotheca Persica. ISBN 978-0-88706-133-2.
- Luther, K. A. (1985). "ALP ARSLĀN". Encyclopaedia Iranica, Vol. I, Fasc. 8-9. pp. 895–898.
- Massignon, Louis (1982). The Passion of al-Hallaj, Mystic and Martyr of Islam. Vol. 2. Translated by Mason, Herbert. Princeton University Press.
- Minorsky, Vladimir (1958). A History of Sharvān and Darband in the 10th-11th Centuries. University of Michigan. pp. 1–219.
- Richards, Donald Sydney (2002). The Annals of the Saljuq Turks: Selections from Al-Kāmil Fīʻl-Taʻrīkh of ʻIzz Al-Dīn Ibn Al-Athīr. Psychology Press. ISBN 0700715762.
- Peacock, Andrew. "SHADDADIDS". Encyclopaedia Iranica.
- Purton, Peter Fraser (2009). A History of the Early Medieval Siege, c. 450–1220. Boydell & Brewer Ltd. ISBN 9781843834489.

Malik-Shah I House of Seljuk Born: 8 August 1055 Died: 19 November 1092
Regnal titles
Preceded by Alp Arslan	Sultan of the Seljuk Empire; 15 December 1072 – 19 November 1092	Succeeded by Mahmud I
