= Bundari =

Iranian writer, notable for translating the Persian epic poem Shahnameh into Arabic

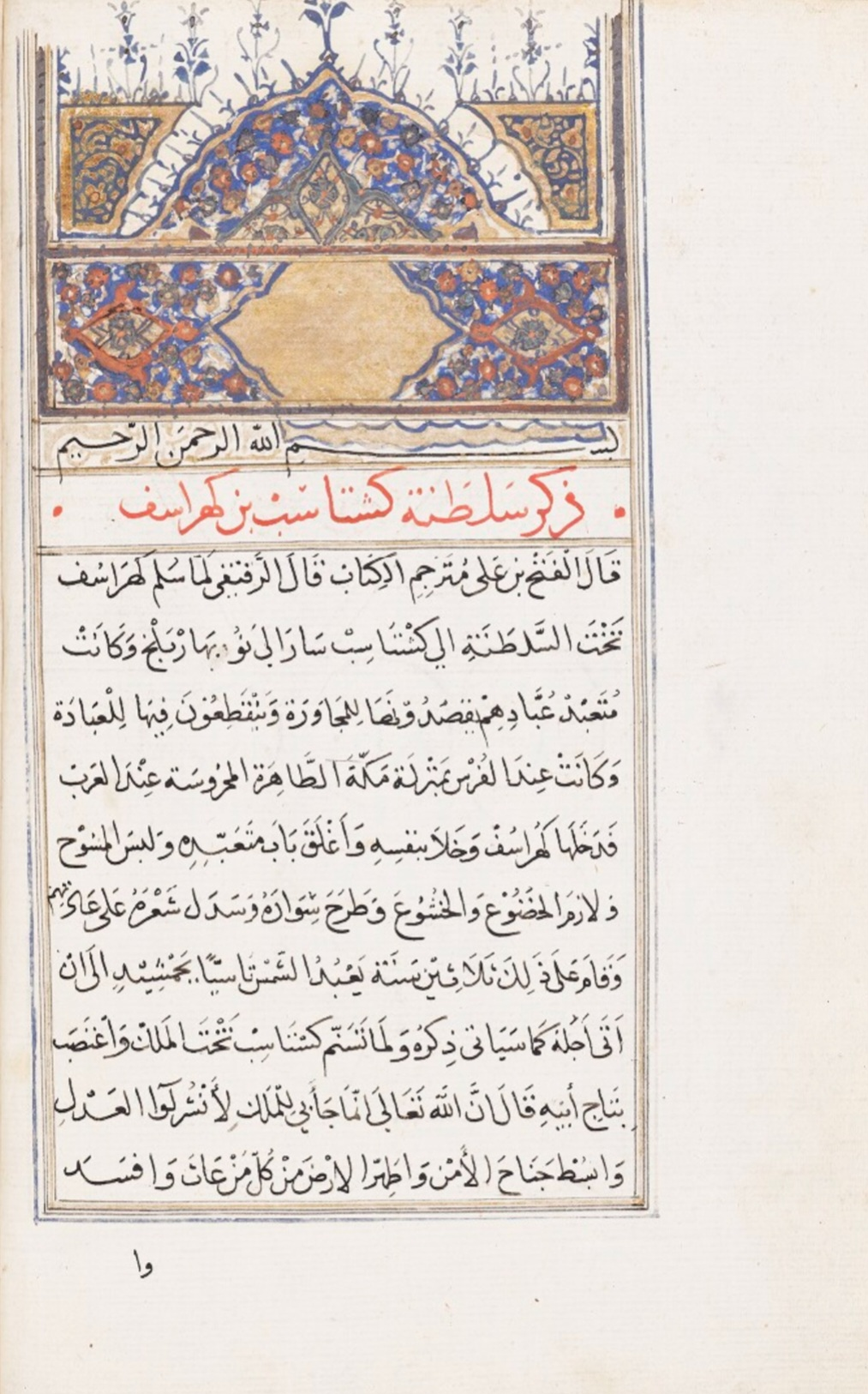
- Manuscript of Bundari's Arabic Translation of the Shahnameh, copied in 1642, Bodleian Library.
- Born: 1190 (?) Isfahan
- Died: after 1241/2
- Notable works: Arabic translation of the Shahnameh; Sana al-Barq al-Shami; Zubdat al-nuṣra wa nukhbat al-usra

Qiwam al-Din al-Fath ibn Ali ibn Muhammad al-Bundari al-Isfahani (Arabic: قوام الدين الفتح إبن علي محمد البنداري الإصفهاني; died after 1241/2), commonly known as Bundari (بنداري) or al-Bundari (البنداري), was an Iranian writer who is known for translating the Persian epic poem Shahnameh into Arabic.

The only information about his life is included in his books. He was most likely from a prominent family, thus his nisba "Bundari", due to the family's connection with the important administrative office of bundar.

Bundari was born and raised in the city of Isfahan, located in Persian Iraq (Irāq-i Ajam), a region corresponding to the western part of Iran. The modern historians al-Ziriklu and Jalili state that he was born in 1190, but the Iranologist Azartash Azarnoosh considered this uncertain. Bundari was one of the many Iranian elites who left their unstable country in the early 13th-century. By 1223, he is reported to have stayed in Damascus in Syria, where he enjoyed the patronage of its Ayyubid ruler al-Mu'azzam Isa (r. 1198–1227). It was to him that Bundari devoted most of his work. Bundari most likely left Damascus after the death of al-Mu'azzam Isa in 1227, possibly returning to Isfahan, which was ruled by the Khwarazmshah. Another possibility is that he went to Baghdad, where he is recorded to have been in 1241/2.

Bundari is also known to have written two other books, the Sana al-Barq al-Shami and Zubdat al-nuṣra wa nukhbat al-usra.

== Sources ==
- Azarnoosh, Azartash (2021). "al-Bundārī". In Madelung, Wilferd; Daftary, Farhad (eds.). Encyclopaedia Islamica Online. Brill Online. ISSN 1875-9831.
- Bosworth, C. Edmund (1998). "ʿErāq-e ʿAjam(ī)". In Yarshater, Ehsan (ed.). Encyclopædia Iranica. Vol. VIII/5: English IV–Eršād al-zerāʿa. London and New York: Routledge & Kegan Paul. p. 538. ISBN 978-1-56859-054-7.
- Durand-Guédy, David (2013). "al-Bundārī, al-Fatḥ b. ʿAlī". In Fleet, Kate; Krämer, Gudrun; Matringe, Denis; Nawas, John; Rowson, Everett (eds.). Encyclopaedia of Islam (3rd ed.). Brill Online. ISSN 1873-9830.
