= Turkic history =

History of the Turkic peoples

Turkic history is the systematic documentation and study of events involving the Turkic peoples.

== Origins ==
Turks are an important political identity of Eurasia. They first appeared at Inner Eurasian steppes and migrated to many various regions (such as Central Asia, West Asia, North Asia, and Eastern Europe.) and participated in many local civilizations there. It is not yet known when, where, and how the Turks formed as a collective identity. However, it is believed that Proto-Turkic people inhabited regions that supported a lifestyle consistent with the Eurasian equestrian pastoral nomadic culture.

Türk was first used as a political identity in history during the Göktürk Khaganate period. The old Turkic script was invented by Göktürks as well. The ruling Ashina clan origins are disputed.

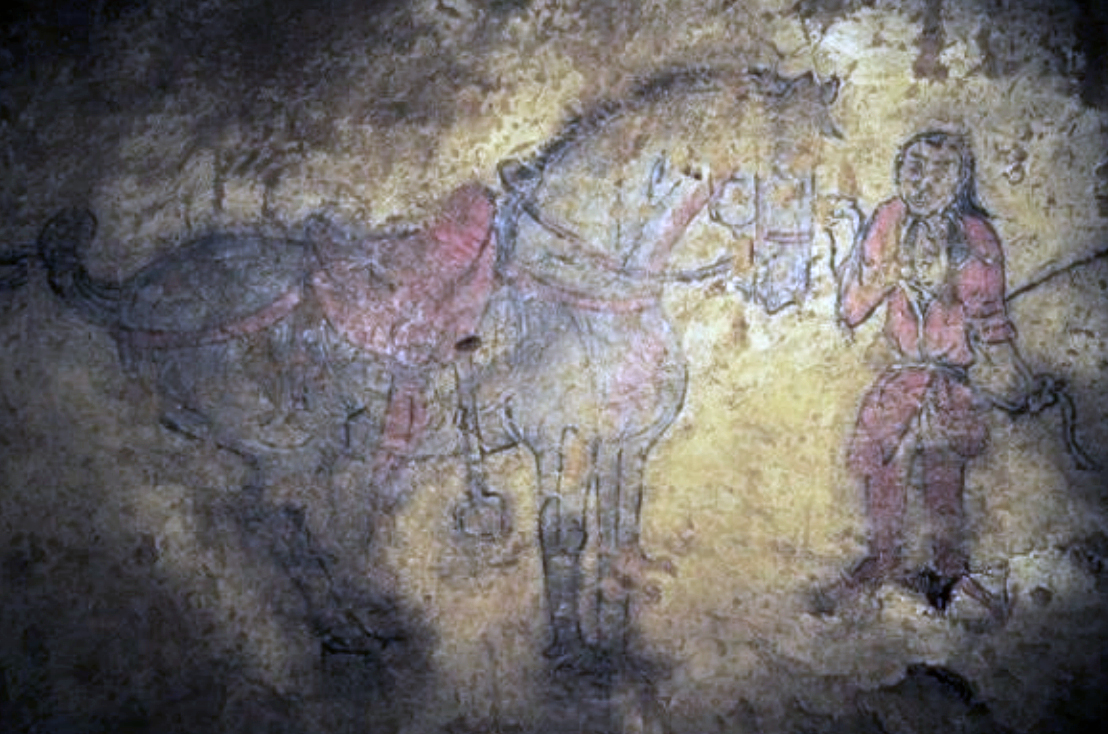
Shoroon Bumbagar tomb mural, Göktürk, 7th century CE, Mongolia.

Although there are debates about its inception, the history of the Turks is an important part of world history. The history of all people that emerged in Eurasia and North Africa has been affected by the movements of the Turks to some degree. Turks also played an important role in bringing Eastern cultures to the West and Western cultures to the East. Their own religion became the pioneer and defender of the foreign religions they adopted after Tengrism, and they helped their spread and development (Manichaeism, Judaism, Buddhism, Orthodox, Nestorian Christianity and Islam).

== The beginning of Turkic history ==
=== 4th century ===
- 395: Migration Period

=== 5th century ===
- 461: Sabir people around Siberia
- 480: Pre-Bulgarians between the Caspian Sea and the Danube

== Middle Ages/Turks ==
=== 6th century ===
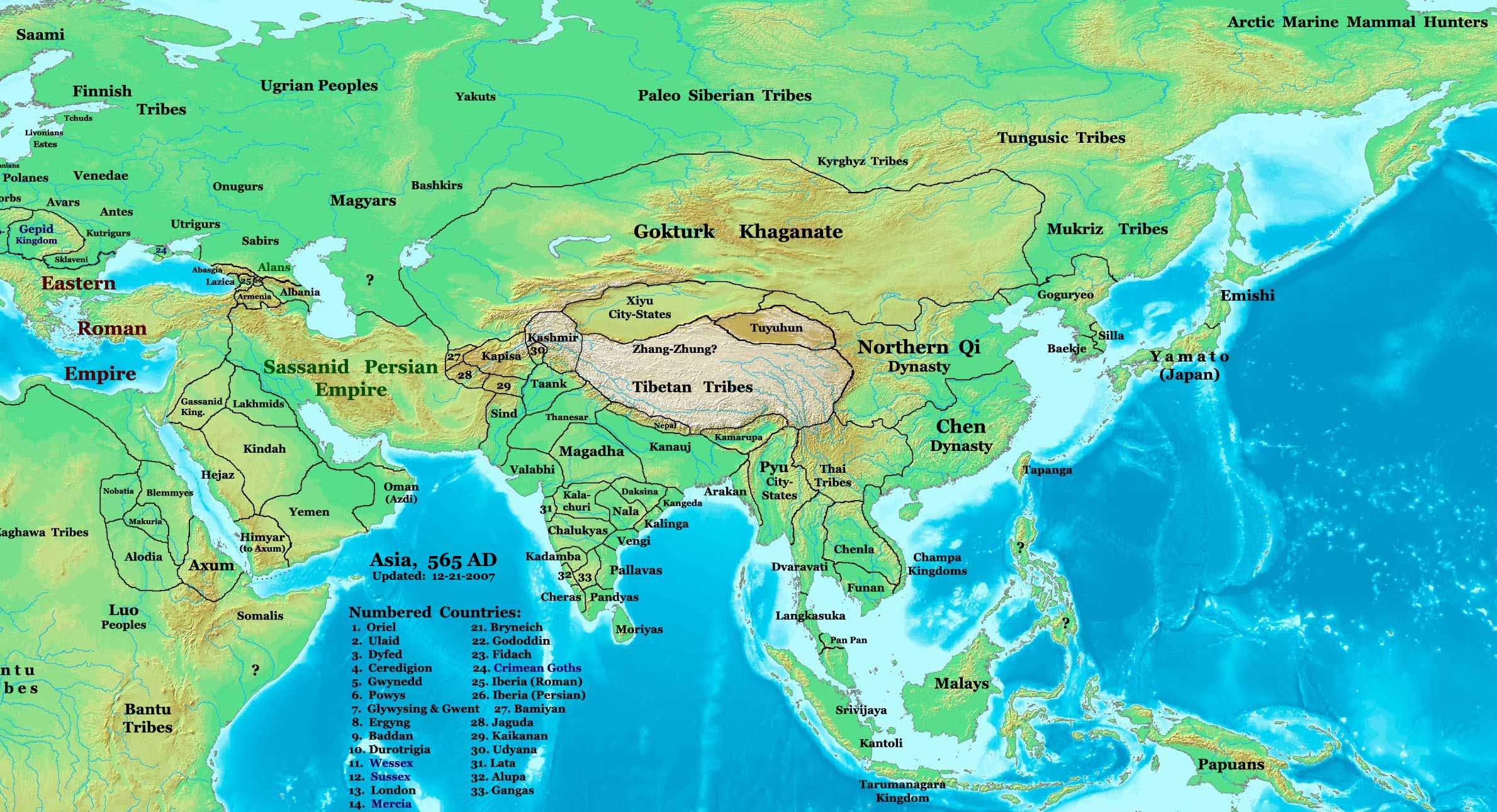
Map of Asia, 565 AD

- 540: The re-emergence of the lost Central Asian Turks mentioned in the Ergenekon epic
- 540: Sasanian King of Iran, Hormizd IV, born to a Khazar princess mother who married Khosrow I
- 551: Establishment of the First Turkic Khaganate.
- 552: Göktürks revolt against Rouran domination.
- 565: Defeat of the Hephthalites on their war with Göktürks.
- 567 : Western Turkic Khaganate ambassador Maniakh sent by Istämi to Constantinople.
- 567 : Establishment of the Pannonian Avars.
- 568: Zemarchus, a Byzantine diplomat, sent to the Göktürk Empire.
- 582: Division of the First Turkic Khaganate.

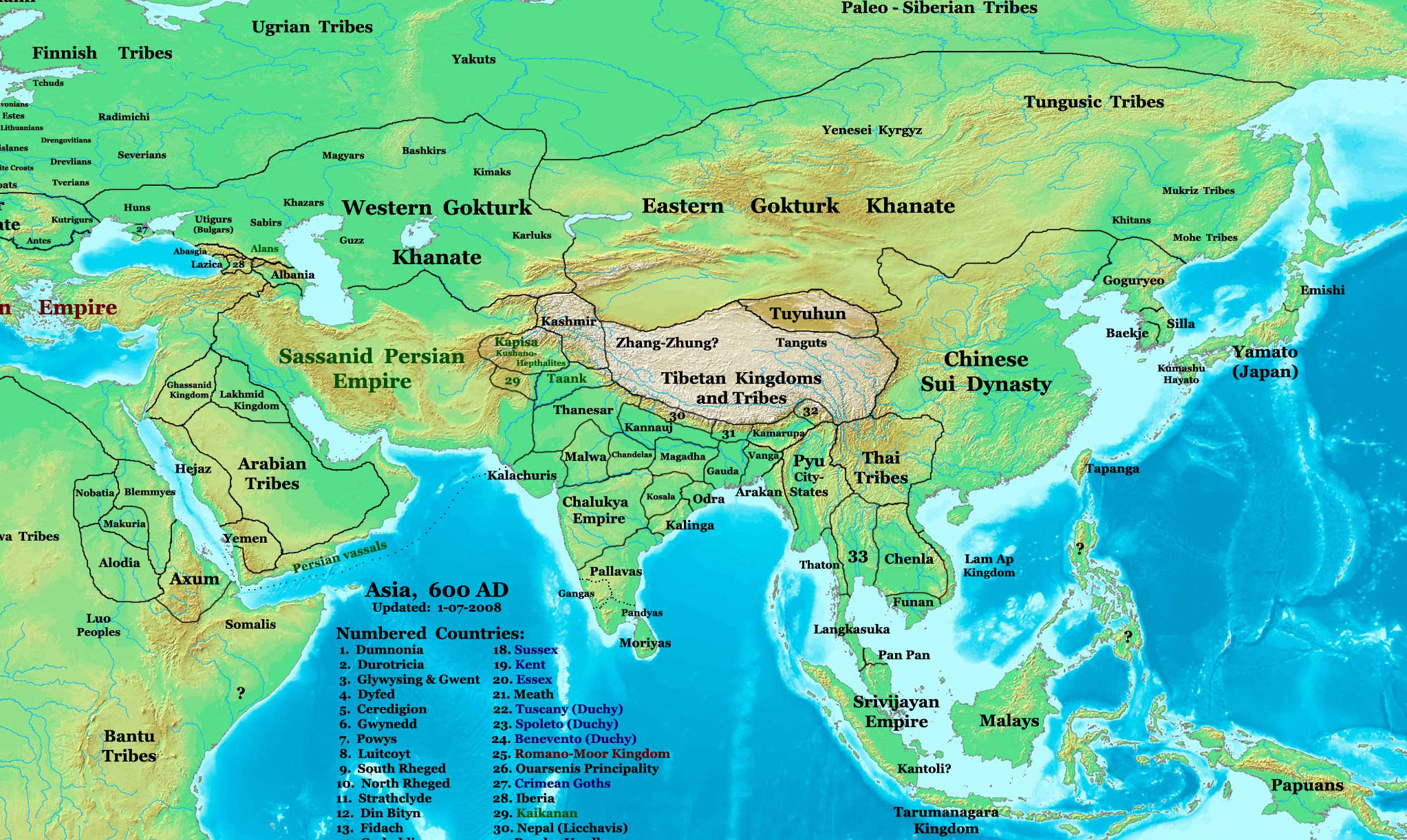
Map of the Asia, 600 AD

== 7th century ==
=== Central Asia ===
- 625 : Establishment of Tokhara Yabghus.
- 630: Eastern Turkic Khaganate came under the Chinese dominance, while the Western Turkic Khaganate was heavily influenced by the Tang.
- 639: Turkic prince Ashina Jiesheshuai's attempt on a Turkic revolt in the Tang emperor's palace.
- 659: Western Turkic Khaganate came under Chinese rule.
- 665: Establishment of Turk Shahis.
- 674: The recruitment of Turkic mercenaries (Mamluks) in Arab armies.
- 681: Second Turkic Khaganate established.
- 699: The establishment of the Turgesh Khanate (in present-day Kyrgyzstan).

=== Eastern Europe ===
- 626–627: Eastern Roman Emperor Heraclius' request for help from the Khazars, the Khazars' invasion of the Caucasus by defeating the Sassanids after the Sassanids and Pannonian Avars besieged Constantinople.
- 630: Khazars' settlement in the Don-Volga basin, which was affiliated to the Western Turkic Khaganate, and the establishment of the Great Bulgarian Khanate in the north of the Black Sea.
- 651–652: War of the Arab Empire and the Khazars, who overthrew the Sassanids and captured all of Iran.
- 678: The division of the Great Bulgarian Khanate by the westward pressure of the Khazars.

== 8th century ==
=== Inner Asia ===
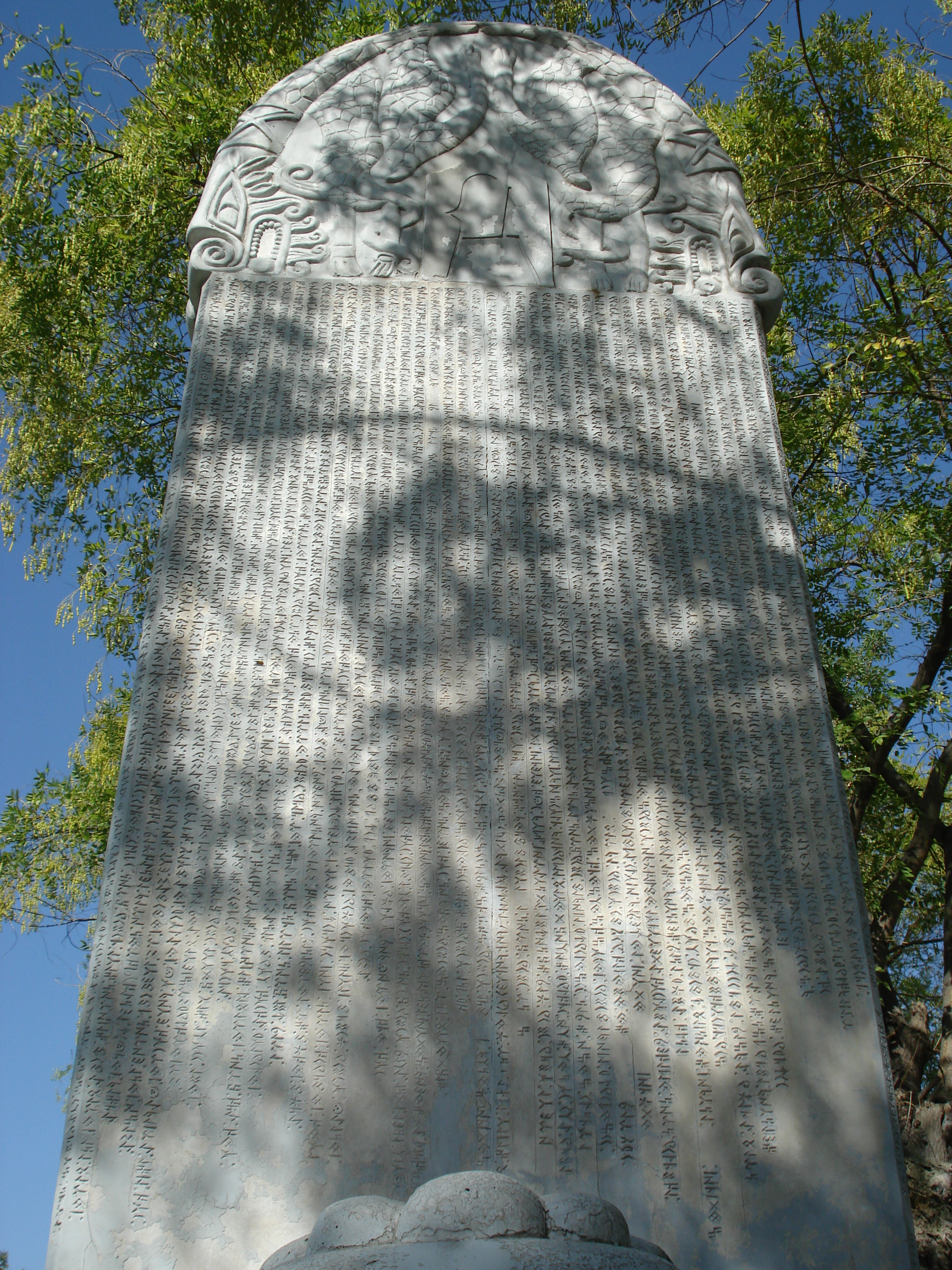
Replica of Bilge Khagan's memorial complex in Turkey.

- 705–715: Arabs take Transoxiana.
- 720–735: Orkhon Monuments in Ötüken.
- 721–737: Turgesh attack against Arabs.
- 744: The destruction of the Second Turkic Khanate by the rebellious Uyghurs, Karluks and Basmyls; Establishment of the Uyghur Khaganate.
- 745: Independent khanate of Kimeks in what is today Kazakhstan.
- 750: The strengthening of Arab-Turkic relations after the Abbasids came to rule the Arab Empire.
- 751: The entry of the Chinese into Central Asia, the defeat of the Chinese by the Arabs with the help of the Karluks in the Battle of Talas, the conversion of the Karluks to Islam.
- 762: Uyghur Khaganate aided Tang dynasty in China in suppressing the An-Lu-Shan uprising.
- 765: Adoption of the Mani religion by the Uyghur Khan Bögü.
- 766: The dissolution of the Türgesh Khanate by the Karluks of the Uyghur Khanate, the establishment of the autonomous Karluk Khanate, the laying of the foundations of the Oghuz Yabgu State by the Oghuzes who escaped from the Karluks and migrated to the vicinity of the Caspian and Aral lakes.
- 789–795: Fight for the throne and decline in the Uyghur Khaganate.

=== Eastern Europe ===
- 705: Theodora of Khazaria, a Khazar princess and Byzantine empress as the second wife of Justinian II
- 713–737: Khazar-Arab War, Khazar loss of Caucasus.
- 716: The first written agreement of the Danube Bulgarian Khanate with the Byzantine Empire and the start of taxation.
- 717–718: Aid of the Bulgarians to Byzantium against the Arab Siege of Constantinople.
- 740: Adoption of Judaism as the official religion of the Khazars.
- 741: Tzitzak, a Khazar princess, Empress of the Byzantine Empire by marriage to Eastern Roman Emperor Constantine V. Mother of Byzantine emperor, Leo IV the Khazar.
- 745–775: Bulgarian-Byzantine relations tense.
- 764: Invasion of the Caucasus and western Iran by the Khazars, defeating the Abbasids.
- 780: Founding of Volga Bulgaria.
- 792: After the Battle of Markeli, Byzantium began to pay taxes to the Bulgarians again.
- 795: Bardanes Tourkos, a Byzantine general of Khazar-Armenian descent who launched an unsuccessful rebellion against Emperor Nikephoros I.

== 9th century ==
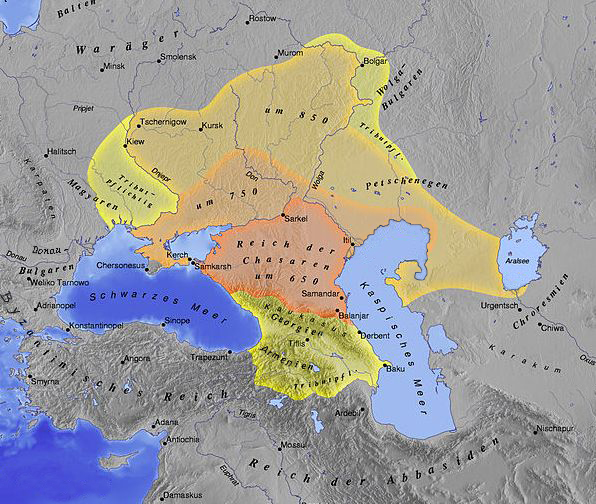
Map of the Khazar Khanate at its greatest extent.

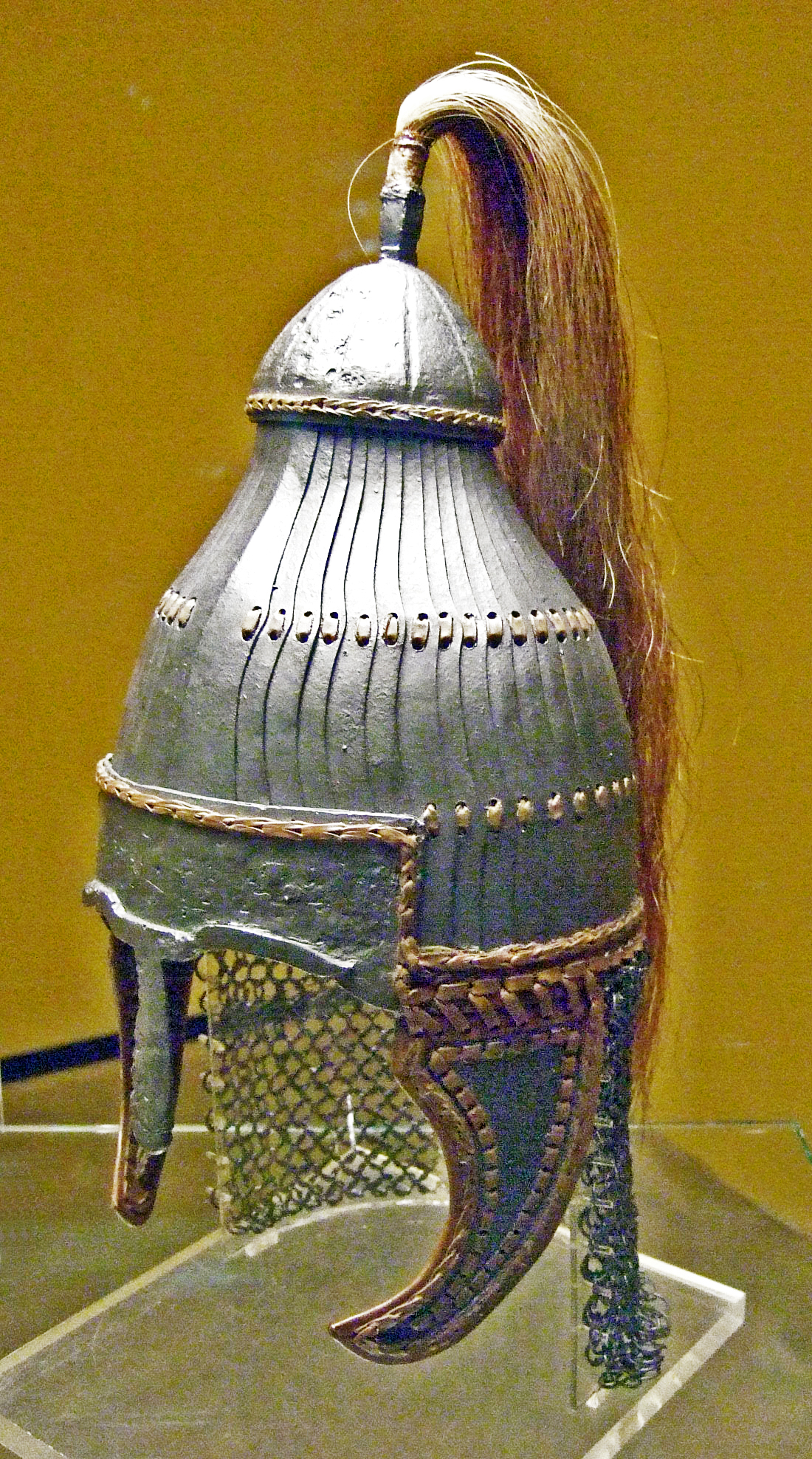
Reconstruction of a lamellar helmet that is being considered as an Avar lamellar helmet from Niederstotzingen, Dated 560–600 AD.

=== Central Asia ===
- 821: Uighurs repulse Tibetans.
- 832: The Uighur Khaganate plunged into turmoil.
- 840: The collapse of the Uyghur Khaganate as a result of the attack of the Kyrgyz people, the establishment of the Kyrgyz Khaganate, the escape of the Uyghurs to the southwest, the Karluks, who did not recognize the Kyrgyz sovereignty, declared their independence and laid the foundation of the Karakhanid State.
- 848: The establishment of the Ganzhou Uyghur Kingdom of the Uyghurs who migrated to the South West.
- 856: The establishment of the Karahoca Uyghur Kingdom by another Uyghur branch that migrated to the southwest.

=== Eastern Europe ===
- 860: The Russians, who expanded to the south, reached Kiev in the Khazar Khaganate.
- 861: Migration of Pechenegs around Syr Darya to the north of the Black Sea under the pressure of Oghuzes, Kimeks and Karluks.
- 880: The formation of the Kimek–Kipchak confederation.
- 889: The advance of the Pechenegs in the north of the Black Sea to the west under the pressure of the Khazars and Kipchaks.
- 892: The Pechenegs advancing to the west forced the Hungarians from the Dnieper to migrate beyond the Carpathians, forming an agreement with the Byzantine Empire.

=== Asia and Africa ===
- 833–842: The increasing influence of Turkic slave soldiers in the Abbasid palace during Caliph Mutasim's reign.
- 836: The relocation of the Abbasid capital from Baghdad to Samarra, where the Turkic slave garrison was located.
- 868: Tulunid sovereignty over Egypt, Syria, Palestine and the north of Iraq, but it still remained nominally within the Abbasid Caliphate.

== 10th century ==
=== Central Asia ===
- 923: The establishment of the Later Tang dynasty by the Shatuo Turks, descended from the Göktürks, in the north of China.
- 924: The destruction of the Kyrgyz State by the Mongol Khitai, the end of the Turkic rule in Ötüken, the migration of the Kyrgyz to their present homeland.
- 934: With Satuk Buğra Khan's acceptance of Islam, the Karakhanid State adopt the religion of Islam, becoming one of the first Turkic states to do so.
- 979: The Shatuo Turks came under the domination of the Han Chinese Northern Song dynasty, the Shatuo flee to Inner Mongolia where they come the Ongud Turks. The Ongud assimilated to the Mongols.
- 990–999: The Karakhanid State destroyed the Samanid Empire, Transoxiana came under Turkic rule after 300 years.

=== Eastern Europe ===
- 920: Russo-Pecheneg War.
- 922: Visit of Ibn Fadlan as ambassador to the Bulgarian Khanate of İdil, which converted to Islam.
- 940: Russian-Byzantine alliance against Khazars, Khazars lose Crimea.
- 943: Pechenegs allied with the Russians against the Byzantine Empire.
- 965: Oghuz Yabgu State's alliance with the Russians against the Khazars.
- 968–972: Pechenegs' attacks on the Russians.
- 969: The capture of the Khazar capital by the prince of Kievan Rus' Svyatoslav I, the withdrawal of the Khazars to the north of the Caucasus.
- 985: Oghuz Yabgu State's alliance with the Russians against the Volga Bulgarian State.
- 986: Settlements of the Seljuks emerge in the south of Kazakhstan by breaking away from the Oghuz Yabgu State.

=== Asia and Africa ===
- 905: The end of the Tulunid dynasty in Egypt by the Abbasids.
- 935: Another Turkic dynasty, the Ikhshidid dynasty, seized power in Egypt and dominated Syria, Palestine, Hejaz and northern Sudan.
- 977: Sabuktigin establishes Ghaznavid dynasty in Khorasan (modern-day Afghanistan)
- 969: Termination of the rule of the Ikhshidid dynasty by the Fatimid Caliphate.
- 999: Mahmud of Ghazni, son of Sabuktigin becomes the first to title himself Sultan.

== 11th century ==
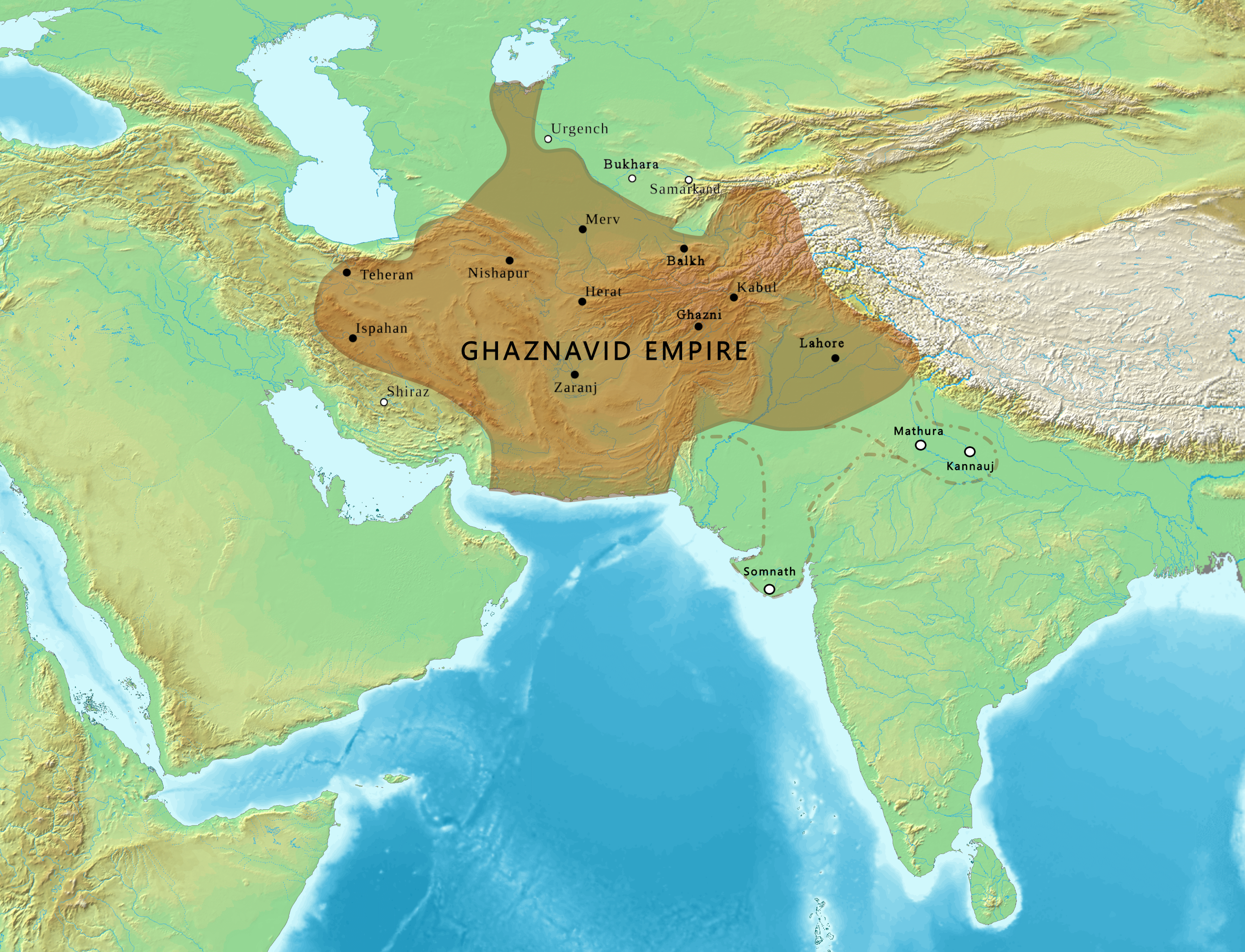
Ghaznavid Empire at its greatest extent in 1030 CE under Mahmud.

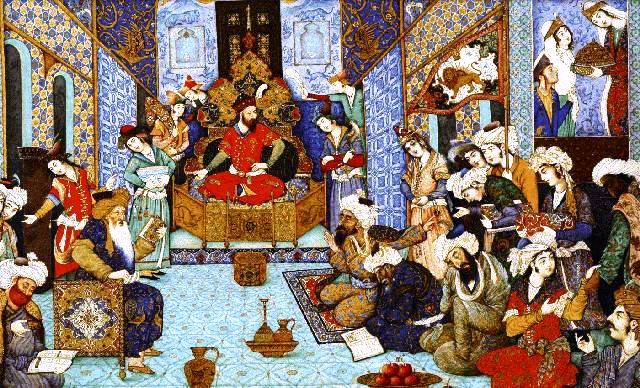
Mahmud of Ghazni and his court.

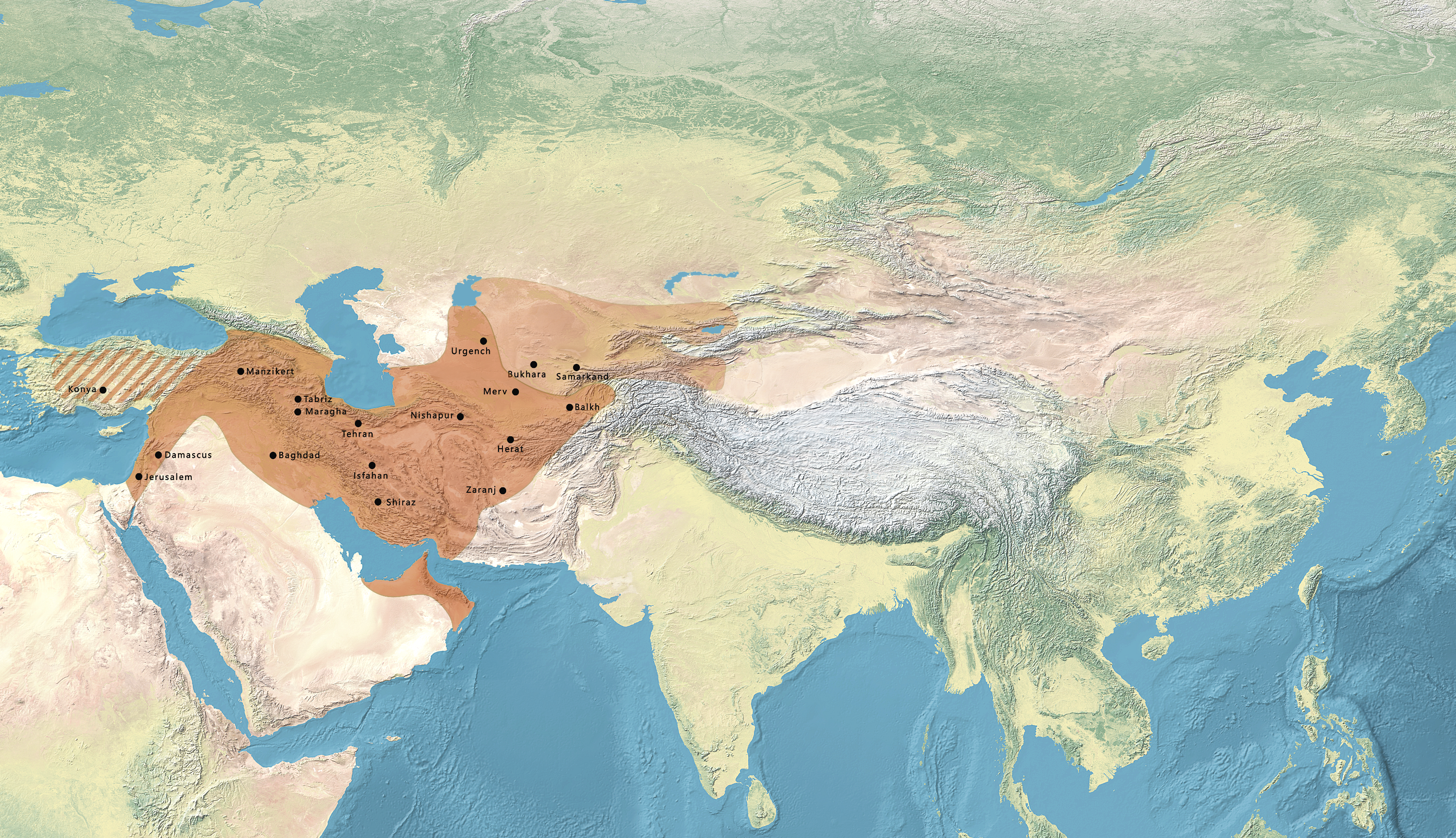
The Seljuk Empire and the Sultanate of Rum, with contemporary Asian polities circa 1100.

=== Central Asia ===
- 1030: Ghaznavid Empire reaches to its greatest extent under Mahmud of Ghazni.
- 1036: The Kansu Uyghur Kingdom came under the rule of the Mongolian Tangut Kingdom.
- 1042: The division of the Karakhanid State into East and West.
- 1050: The destruction of the Kimek Khanate by the invasion of the Kipchaks.
- 1089: Samarkand-centered Western Karakhanid State became Seljuk vassals.
- 1091: The Eastern Karakhanid State, based in Kashgar, became subject to the Seljuks.
- 1092: As a result of the Great Seljuk State being dragged into internal turmoil, the two Karakhanid states became independent again.

=== Eastern Europe ===
- 1016: The destruction of the Khazar Khaganate by the Russians and the Byzantine Empire
- 1037: Settlement of Pechenegs defeated by the Russians in Romania.
- 1061–1068: The Kipchaks, who defeated the Russians, captured the north of the Black Sea and Ukraine
- 1091: After the Battle of Manzikert, the Pechenegs, who attacked the Byzantine Empire, which was in turmoil, were destroyed by the Byzantine-Kipchak alliance around Enez.
- 1093: Cuman–Kipchak Confederation decisive defeat of the Kievan Rus' at the Battle of the Stuhna River. (Note: Curta states "The Cumans defeated Sviatopolk II, grand prince of Kiev in 1093 and took Torchesk.")

=== Asia ===
- 1038: Establishment of the Seljuk State in Khorasan.
- 1040: In the Battle of Dandanaqan, the Seljuks defeated the Ghaznavids and spread towards Persia.
- 1048: The Seljuks, who defeated the Byzantine-Georgian alliance at the Battle of Kapetron, entered Eastern Anatolia.
- 1055: Seljuks conquer Baghdad and seize the Abbasid Caliphate.
- 1056: Sejuk princess, Khadija Arslan Khatun, married to the Abbasid Caliph, Al-Qaim.
- 1063: Abbasid princess, Sayida Khatun, daughter of Abbasid Caliph Al-Qaim married to the Seljuk Sultan, Tughril I.
- 1064: Seljuks conquer Ani Castle and break the Armenian-Georgian resistance.
- 1071: The Oghuz Turkomans who defeated the Byzantine Empire at the Battle of Manzikert, started settlements in Anatolia.
- 1071: Sifri Khatun, Seljuk princess, daughter of sultan Alp Arslan married to the Abbasid caliph, Al-Muqtadi.
- 1072: Establishment of Danishmend Principality in Sivas as subordinate to Great Seljuks.
- 1077: Establishment of the Seljuk Sultanate of Rûm whose capital is Iznik as subordinate to the Great Seljuks.
- 1081: The construction of the navy on the Aegean coast of the Çaka Principality and the establishment of the Turkish naval presence.
- 1085: Establishment of the Syrian Seljuk State.
- 1087: Mah-i Mulk Khatun, Seljuk princess, daughter of Malik-Shah I married to the Abbasid caliph, Al-Muqtadi. Abbasid and Seljuk Prince, Ja'far ibn Abdallah al-Muqtadi, was born from this marriage.
- 1092: As a result of the murder of Sultan Melikşah by the Order of Assassins, the Great Seljuk State was dragged into internal turmoil.
- 1096: The destruction of the People's Crusade of the First Crusade by the Anatolian Seljuk State in Iznik.
- 1096–1099: As a result of the First Crusade, Iznik and Western Anatolia were taken back by Byzantium, and Crusader states were formed on the Syrian and Palestinian coasts.

=== South Asia ===
- 1001–1027: The expeditions of Mahmud of Ghazni, the ruler of the Ghaznavids, in Indian subcontinent resulted in the spread of Turkic sovereignty and Islam to the north of India.
- 1037–1059: The struggle of the Ghaznavids with the Seljuk Empire resulted into Khorasan and Iran being dominated by the Seljuks.
- 1059: Peace treaty between Ghaznavids and Seljuks.
- 1079–1080: Ghaznavids's defeat at the hands of the Ghurid dynasty, which gained power in Afghanistan.

== 12th century ==
=== Asia ===
- 1100: The Danishmends defeated the Principality of Antioch in Malatya and definitively stopped the Crusaders' advance to Southeastern Anatolia.
- 1101: The defeat of the Sultanate of Rum and the Danishmends by the Crusaders in Kastamonu and Merzifon.
- 1104: The Great Seljuk State defeated the Crusaders in Harran and blocked their advance to the Euphrates.
- 1104: Establishment of Börüoğulları Atabey in Damascus
- 1105–1128: Seljuks struggle against the Crusaders in Syria, the resistance of Damascus and Aleppo to the Crusader sieges
- 1108: Seljuk princess, Ismah Khatun, married to the Abbasid Caliph, Al-Mustazhir.
- 1124: Seljuk princess, Amira Khatun, married to the Abbasid Caliph, Al-Mustarshid.
- 1127: Establishment of Zengi Atabegate in Mosul.
- 1127–1174: The struggle of the Zengid's with the Crusaders.
- 1137: Seljuk princess, Fatimah Khatun, married to the Abbasid Caliph, Al-Muqtafi.
- 1140: Abbasid princess, Zubaydah, daughter of Al-Muqtafi married to the Seljuk Sultan, Ghiyath ad-Din Mas'ud.
- 1144: The conquest of Urfa by the Zengid's
- 1144: Establishment of Beytegin Atabegate in Erbil
- 1147–1149: Organized after the fall of Urfa, in the Second Crusade, the Anatolian Seljuk State defeated the Crusaders' German army in Eskişehir and Ladik, the Zengid's lifted the Crusaders' Siege of Damascus.
- 1150: The elimination of the Urfa County, one of the four Crusader states, by the Zengids.
- 1154: Dissolution of the Börioğulları Atabey by the Zengids.
- 1158: Abbasid princess, Kerman Khatun, daughter of Al-Muqtafi, married to the Seljuk Sultan, Muhammad II ibn Mahmud and then another Seljuk Sultan, Arslan-Shah.
- 1173–1178: The Anatolian Seljuk State became the only power in Anatolia by capturing all the lands of the Danishmends.
- 1174–1183: Salahaddin Ayyubi's Ending Zengid sovereignty in Syria.
- 1176: The defeat of the Byzantines by the Anatolian Seljuk State in the Battle of Myriokephalon, the finalization of the Seljuk sovereignty in Anatolia.
- 1186: Seljuk princess, Seljuki Khatun married to the Abbasid Caliph, al-Nasir.
- 1190: The invasion of Konya by the German army of the Crusaders in the Third Crusade, the disintegration of the German army after the drowning of the German Emperor Frederick Barbarossa in Silifke.
- 1192: Seljuk Sultan, Kaykhusraw I married to Dawlat Raziya Khatun, daughter of Manuel Maurozomes, a Byzantine nobleman.

=== Iran and Central Asia ===
- 1092–1118: Internal turmoil and emergence of semi-independent Atabegates within the Great Seljuk State
- 1132: The Qara Khitai started to move towards Turkic lands by eliminating the Qocho.
- 1134: Qara Khitai overthrow the Eastern Karakhanids.
- 1137: Qara Khitai overthrow the Western Karakhanids and end their rule in Central Asia.
- 1141: The collapse of the Great Seljuk Empire, which was defeated by the Qara Khitai in the Battle of Qatwan.
- 1154–1157: Dissolution of the Great Seljuk State after the rebellion of the Oghuz, the independence of the Khorezmshahs.
- 1182–1194: The Khwarazmshahs conquered Transoxiana and Iran by defeating the Seljuks, Ghurids and Qara Khitai.
- 1188: The Kerman Seljuk State, one of the successors of the Great Seljuk State, overthrown by the Oghuz band of Malik Dinar.
- 1194: The abolition of the Iraqi Seljuk State, one of the successors of the Great Seljuk State, by the Khwarazmian Empire.

=== South Asia ===
- 1135: The Seljuk army re-entering Ghazni and taxing the Ghaznavids again.
- 1148–1151: Great destruction caused by the Ghurids after capturing Ghazni.
- 1152: Seljuks capture of Ghazni from Ghurids.
- 1157–1163: With the disintegration of the Great Seljuk State, Ghazni and Afghanistan fell back into the hands of the Ghurids.
- 1186: The conquest of the Ghaznavid State, which continued to dominate Punjab, with Lahore as its capital, caused by the Ghurids.

=== Eastern Europe ===
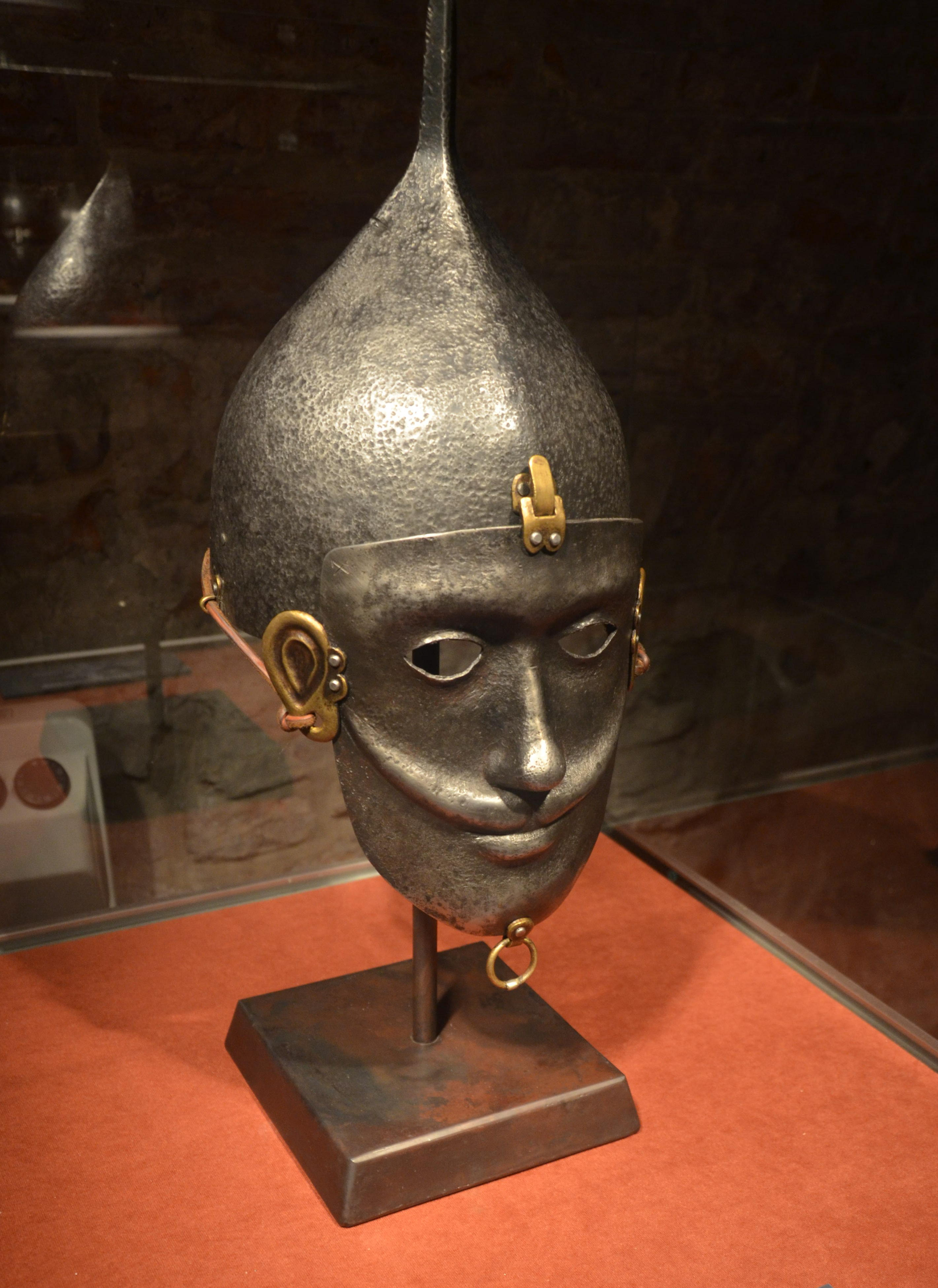
Cuman battle mask, c. 13th century

- 1111–1116: Kipchak tribes defeated by the Russians.
- 1123: Georgians supported by Kipchaks expel Great Seljuks from Tbilisi.
- 1150: The Kipchaks regain their strength in the Dnieper.
- 1154: The Kipchaks, who repulsed the Russians, re-established their dominance around Kharkiv.
- 1157–1174: Conflicts between Volga Bulgarians and Russians.
- 1174–1185: Military successes of the Kipchaks against the Russians.
- 1200: The dissolution of the Kimek–Kipchak confederation.

== 13th century ==
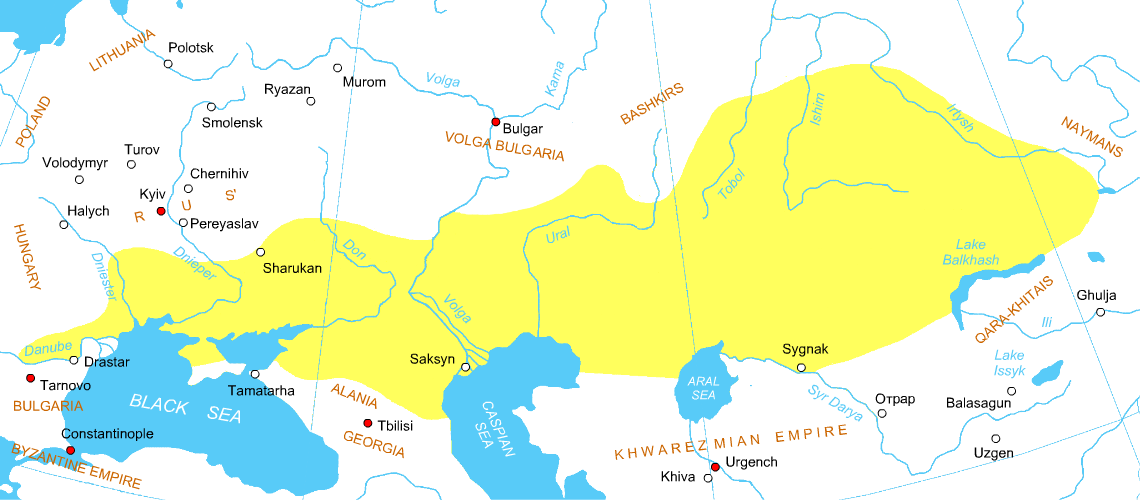
Cuman–Kipchak confederation, c. 1200 CE

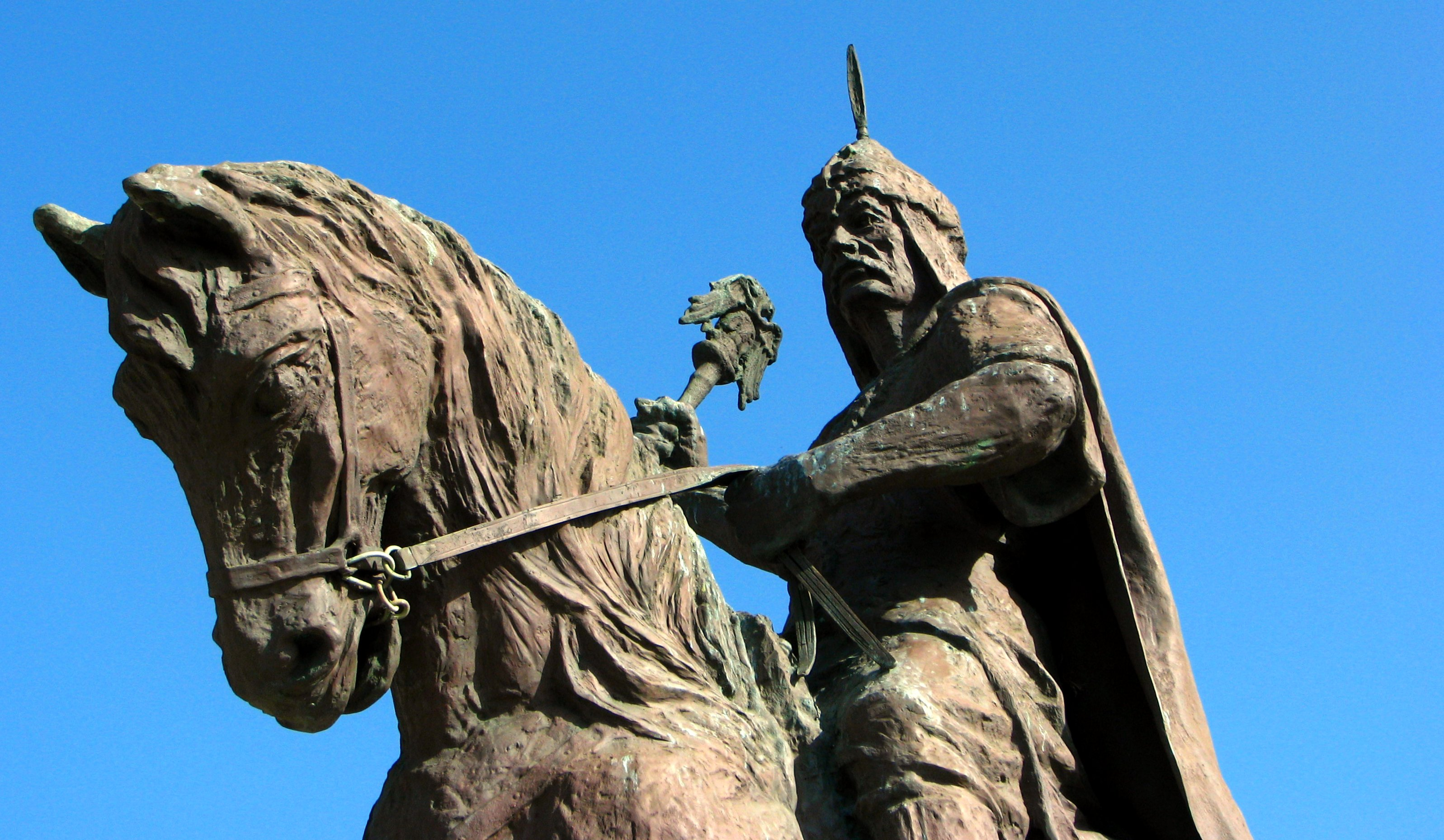
Statue of Kayqubad I (r. 1220–1237) in Alanya, Turkey

Spread of the Mongol Empire in the 13th century

=== Asia and the Middle East ===
- 1202: The expansion of the Anatolian Seljuk State to Eastern Anatolia by eliminating the Saltuklu Principality
- 1207: The opening of the Anatolian Seljuk State to the Mediterranean with the conquest of Antalya
- 1214: The opening of the Anatolian Seljuk State to the Black Sea with the conquest of Sinop
- 1228: Elimination of the Mengüçlü Principality by the Anatolian Seljuk State
- 1230: The Khorezmshahs, who escaped from the Mongol invasion and advanced to Anatolia, were stopped by the Anatolian Seljuk State in the Battle of Yassıçemen
- 1239: The revolt of Baba İshak weakened the Anatolian Seljuk State.
- 1243: The defeat of the Anatolian Seljuk State by the Mongols in the Battle of Kösedağ
- 1250: The seizure of power by the Turkish-origin Mamluk Sultanate in Egypt, putting an end to the Ayyubids
- 1255: Karim al-Din Karaman founded the Karaman State, with Ermenek as its capital.
- 1299: Founding of the Ottoman State

=== Central Asia ===
- 1212: The elimination of the Karakhanids, who ruled in Fergana, by the Khwarazmshahs State.

=== South Asia ===
- 1206: Establishment of Delhi Sultanate by Turkic-origin slave commanders
- 1236: Delhi Sultanate's dominance of all of northern India, Kashmir and Bangladesh
- 1290: Turko-Afghan-origin Khalji dynasty seized power in the Delhi Sultanate

=== 14th century ===
- 1320–1424: Tughluk Dynasty in Delhi established and ruled most of the India.
- 1346: The Ottomans entered Europe.
- 1361: Conquest of Edirne by the Ottomans occurred.
- 1370: The Salars are descended from Turkmen who migrated from Central Asia and settled in a Tibetan area of Qinghai under Ming Chinese rule. The Salar ethnicity formed and underwent ethnogenesis from a process of male Turkmen migrants from Central Asia marrying Amdo Tibetan women during the early Ming dynasty.
- 1370: Timur's seizure of power, establishment of Timurid Empire.
- 1382: Tokhtamysh leads the Golden Horde's Army and sets Moscow on fire.
- 1389: Battle of Kosovo: Ottoman domination in the Balkans
- 1389–1403: Reign of Bayezid
- 1398: Timur's military expedition to India

=== 15th century ===
==== Asia ====
- 1402: Battle of Ankara between Timur and Bayezid I
- 1406: Re-emergence of Akkoyunlu and Karakoyunlu people on the stage of history
- 1453: Conquest of Istanbul by Mehmed the Conqueror
- 1453–1504: The golden age of the Akkoyunlu state.

==== Central Asia ====
- 1405: Timur's death
- 1405–1447: Arrival of Shahruh in Herat
- 1447–1449: Ulugh Beg
- 1465: Establishment of the Kazakh Khanate

==== Eastern Europe ====
- 1430: Crimean Khanate formed
- 1445: Establishment of the Khanate of Kazan
- 1462–1505: Astrakhan Khanate, Kazakh khanate created
- 1473: Sultan Husayn Bayqara: Timurid Renaissance

== Modern era (1500 AD – present) ==
=== 16th century ===
==== Eastern Europe ====
- 1502: The Crimean Khanate's destruction of the Golden Horde state
- 1552: Russia's annexation of the Kazan Khanate
- 1556: The annexation of the Astrakhan Khanate by Russia
- 1557: Russia's annexation of the Nogai Khanate
- 1571: Crimean Khanate burns Moscow
- 1580–1598: Russia's elimination of the Siberian Khanate

==== Central Asia ====
- 1500: Muhammed Shaybani and Uzbeks in Transoxiana
- 1510: The defeat of Muhammed Shaybani by Shah Ismail

==== Asia ====
- 1502: Ismail's establishment of the Safavid dynasty in Iran
- 1514: The Battle of Çaldıran, the settlement of the Ottomans in Eastern Anatolia
- 1516: Battle of Ridaniye, Ottomans taking Syria and Palestine from the Mamluk State
- 1517: Ottoman domination in Hijaz
- 1534: Ottomans taking Iraq from Safavids
- 1538: Ottoman domination in Yemen
- 1551: Ottoman rule reaching Qatar and Oman
- 1578: Ottomans reaching the Caspian Sea
- 1590: Ottoman conquest of the entire Caucasus and Western Iran

==== South Asia ====
- 1526: Establishment of the Mughal Empire

==== Africa ====
- 1516: Establishment of Ottoman administration in Algeria
- 1516–1517: The Ottomans' destruction of the Mamluk State, Ottoman domination in Egypt
- 1551: Beginning of Ottoman rule in Libya
- 1557: Establishment of the Abyssinian Province by the Ottomans
- 1574: Beginning of Ottoman rule in Tunisia
- 1574: The spread of Ottoman rule in Fezzan
- 1576–1580: Ottoman influence in Morocco

=== 17th century ===
==== Eastern Europe ====
- 1600: The defeat of the Siberian Khanate.
- 1606: The Treaty of Zitvatorok, which symbolized the Ottoman Empire's peak
- 1683: Siege of Vienna by the Ottomans.
- 1699: Treaty of Karlowitz. The decline of the Ottomans.

==== Central Asia ====
- 1605: Russian invasion of Yenisey
- 1615–1650: The struggle of the Yenisei Kyrgyz people against the Russians
- 1620: Russia's annexation of Yakut lands
- 1628: Dolgan's domination by Russia
- 1628–1630: Another Mongolian tribe, the Kalmyks, who were defeated by the Eastern Mongols, trampled on Kazakhstan and settled in the Volga region.
- 1634–1642: Russia's suppression of the Yakut revolts
- 1639: Russia's Reaching the Pacific Ocean
- 1680: Mongol capture East Turkestan, end of Chagatai Khanate

==== South Asia ====
- 1628–1658: Shah Jahan, emperor of India.
- 1658–1707: Aurangzeb, emperor of India.

=== 18th century ===
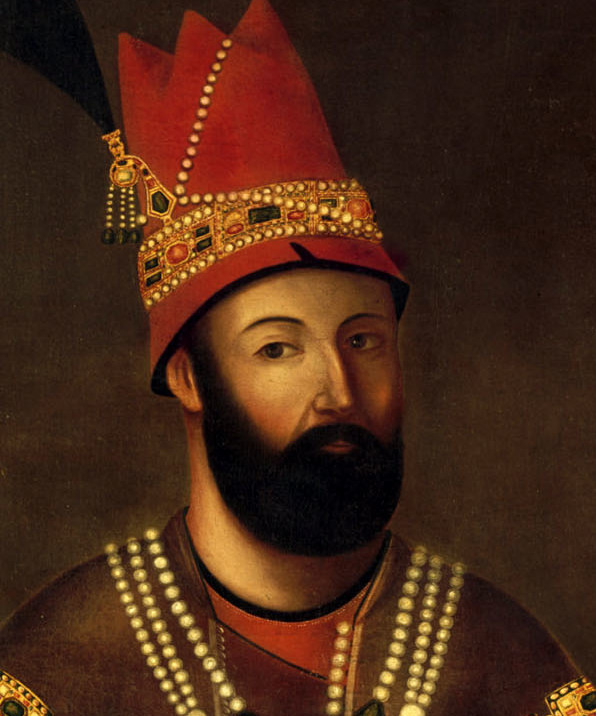
A contemporary court portrait of Nader Shah, a member of the Turkic Afshar tribe, who established Afsharid Iran.

==== Eastern Europe ====
- 1742–1775: Pugachev War in Russia (Tatar uprising)
- 1783: Annexation of Crimea by the Russians.

==== Asia ====
- 1717–1730: Tulip Era of the Ottomans.
- 1736–1747: Nader Shah of Turkoman origin established Afsharid Empire, owning the identity of Turkic Afshar tribes.
- 1794: Qajar dynasty founded in Iran by a Turk.

==== Central Asia ====
- 1709: Establishment of Kokand Khanate
- 1709–1718: The Dzungarian-Kazakh Khanate Conflict
- 1718: The division of the Kazakh Khanate into three kingdoms.
- 1721: Russia's annexation of Khakassia
- 1731: The minor part of the Kazakh Khanate came under Russian protection.
- 1740–1747: Iranian domination in the Khiva Khanate
- 1755–1759: The Manchu Dynasty, which took over the administration in China, seized East Turkestan which was in the hands of the Dzungarians
- 1755: Tuva under the rule of the Manchu Dynasty, which seized power in China
- 1756: Russia's capture of the Altai region
- 1785: Manghud's takeover of the Bukhara Khanate

==== Africa ====
- 1705: The Huseyni Dynasty appointed in Tunisia, which was a part of the Ottoman Empire
- 1798–1799: Egypt expedition of Napoleon Bonaparte. Turkish-French conflicts.

=== 19th century ===
==== Eastern Europe ====
- 1829: Greece's independence
- 1878: Treaty of Berlin, Serbia, Montenegro, Romania gaining their independence, Bulgaria gaining autonomy
- 1881: Greek annexation of Thessaly
- 1885: Bulgaria's annexation of Eastern Rumelia
- 1813: Russia's annexation of Dagestan and Azerbaijan
- 1827: Russian domination of the Balkars
- 1828: Karachays' entry into Russian domination
- 1828: Russia's annexation of Yerevan and Nakhchivan
- 1829: Russia's annexation of Akhaltsikhe
- 1839: Tanzimat Edict in the Ottoman Empire
- 1876: The first constitution of the Ottoman Empire legislated.

==== Central Asia ====
- 1820: The Great Juz of the Kazakh Khanate came under the rule of the Kokand Khanate
- 1847: The lands of the Kazakh Khanate completely passed into the hands of Russia
- 1851–1854: The defeat of the Khiva Khanate to the Russians
- 1864: The start of Russian expeditions to West Turkestan
- 1865: Establishment of Kashgar Khanate in East Turkestan
- 1866: The Emirate of Bukhara came under Russian rule
- 1868: The Kokand Khanate came under Russian rule
- 1871: Russian occupation of Lake Balkhash
- 1873: The Khiva Khanate came under Russian rule
- 1876: Russia's annexation of the Khanate of Kokand
- 1877–1878: China's elimination of the Khanate of Kashgar
- 1881–1884: Russia's annexation of Turkmenistan

==== South Asia ====
- 1805: The Mughal State came under the auspices of the British who defeated the Maratha Confederation
- 1857: The British overthrow the Mughal State

==== Africa ====
- 1807: British abolish slave trade, Royal Navy patrol around Africa to intercept slave ships
- 1822: Sudan's entry into Ottoman rule
- 1830–1842: French invasion of Algeria
- 1831–1840: Ottoman-Egyptian struggle, Egypt gaining autonomy
- 1869: Opening of the Suez Canal
- 1881: Second French invasion of Algeria
- 1882: British invasion of Egypt
- 1885: Italian invasion of Habesh
- 1885: End of Turkish rule in Sudan
- 1888: British invasion of Somalia, end of Turkish presence in Horn of Africa

=== 20th century ===
- 1905: Beginning of Jadidism movements.
- 1910–1920: Alash Horda Government of Kazakhs and Kyrgyz
- 1911–1912: Invasion of Tripoli by Italy
- 1912: Balkan wars
- 1915–1916: Gallipoli campaign
- 1917: Turkistan's declaration of autonomy
- 1918: The Armistice of Mudros was signed between Turkey and the Allied Powers.
- 1918: Establishment of Azerbaijan Democratic Republic.
- 1919–1922: The Turkish War of Independence took place.
- 1919–1928: Basmachi Uprising against the Soviet Union
- 1921–1944: Tuvan People's Republic
- 1922: Turkish victory over Greeks
- 1923: Turkey officially became a State and a Republic after the victorious Turkish War of Independence
- 1932–1934: East Turkestan Islamic Republic of Uyghurs in China
- 1938: Ataturk's death
- 1944: Short-lived East Turkestan Republic established with the help of the Russian army
- 1945: formation of the autonomous government of South Azerbaijan by Pishevari "Tabriz, Ardebil, Urmia, Zanjan, Qəzvin"
- 1946: The killing of the Turkic nation of South Azerbaijan by the Pahlavi regime
- 1971: European withdrawal from Central Asia
- 1974: Turkish invasion of Cyprus
- 1983: The declaration of independence of the Turkish Republic of Northern Cyprus
- 1988: The beginning of the Azeri-Armenian conflict
- 1990: Soviet invasion of Baku
- 1991: The collapse of the USSR and themergence of the Commonwealth of Independent States
- 1992: Admission of the CIS Turkic republics to the UN:
  - Kazakhstan
  - Uzbekistan
  - Azerbaijan
  - Turkmenistan
  - Kyrgyzstan
- 1992: The first Turkic Speaking Countries Summit was held in Ankara on 30 October 1992.
- 1993: The occupation of a region of Azerbaijan by the Armenians.
- 1993: In 1993, the Turkish Culture and Arts Joint Administration was established in Almaty, which provides cooperation in the fields of culture and arts of Turkic Speaking Countries.
- 1993: The first Turkic Congress, which was a cultural, economic and political forum and was attended by all Turkic states and communities and related communities.

=== 21st century ===
- 2005: Tulip Revolution in Kyrgyzstan.
- 2005: Kazakh leader Nursultan Nazarbayev's proposal to establish a common market in Central Asia in his address to the nation.
- 2005: Andijan massacre in Uzbekistan
- 2006: Baku-Tbilisi-Ceyhan pipeline put into service.
- 2007: The first meeting of riparian countries to determine the status of the Caspian Sea.
- 2008: Establishment of the Parliamentary Assembly of Turkic Speaking Countries between Turkey, Azerbaijan, Kazakhstan and Kyrgyzstan on 21 November 2008.
- 2009: Establishment of Organization of Turkic States.
- 2013: Gezi Park protests
- 2016: Turkish coup attempt by Peace at Home Council

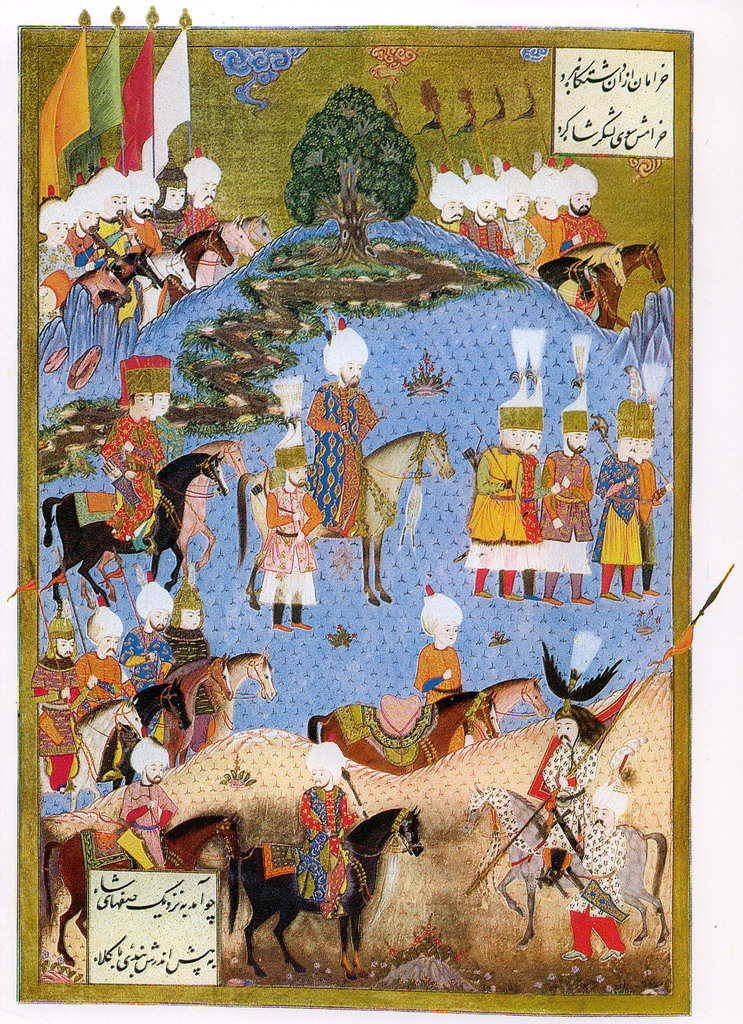
A miniature showing the march of Suleiman the Magnificent to Nakhchivan.

== Notes ==
=== Turkish books ===
- İbrahim Kafesoğlu, Türk Millî Kültürü, Ankara, 1983.
- Zeki. Velidi Togan, Umumi Türk Tarihine Giriş, İstanbul, 1970.
- Faruk Sümer, Oğuzlar, İstanbul, 1980.
- Bahaeddin Ögel, İslamiyetten Önce Türk Kültür Tarihi, Ankara, 1962.
- Bahaeddin Ögel, Türk Kültür Tarihine Giriş, İstanbul, 1978.
- Bahaeddin Ögel, Büyük Hun İmparatorluğu Tarihi, Ankara, 1981.
- Çeçen Anıl, Tarihte Türk Devletleri, İstanbul, 1986.
- O. Esad Arseven, Türk Sanat Tarihi, İstanbul, 1955.
- Muharrem Ergin, Orhun Abideleri, İstanbul, 1977.
- Erol Güngör, Tarihte Türkler, İstanbul, 1989.
- Abdülkadir İnan, Eski Türk Dini Tarihi, İstanbul, 1976.
- A. Nimet Kurat, Karadeniz Kuzeyindeki Türk Kavimleri ve Devletleri, Ankara, 1972.
- Hüseyin Namık Orkun, Eski Türk Yazıtları, İstanbul, 1986.
- Hüseyin Namık Orkun, Türk Tarihi, Ankara, 1946.
- Osman Turan, Türk Cihan Hakimiyeti Mefrukesi Tarihi, İstanbul, 1978.
- Bahaeddin Ögel, Türk Mitolojisi, Ankara, 1971.
- Yusuf Hikmet Bayur, Hindistan Tarihi, Ankara, 1946.
- İbrahim Kafesoğlu, Selçuklu Tarihi, İstanbul, 1972.
- İbrahim Kafesoğlu, Harzemşahlar Devleti Tarihi, Ankara, 1956.
- M. Altay Köymen, Büyük Selçuklu İmparatorluğu Tarihi, Ankara, 1954.
- Çağatay Uluçay, İlk Müslüman Türk Devletleri, İstanbul, 1977.
- Faruk Sümer, Karakoyunlular, Ankara, 1984.
- A.N. Kurat, Peçenek Tarihi, İstanbul, 1937.
- B. Yenilmez, Yenilmez, Rize, 2002.

=== English and foreign books ===
- R. Grousset, L'Empire des steppes, Paris, 1960 (Türkçe çevirisi: Reşat Uzmen-Bozkır İmparatorluğu, 1996.)
- DE. Guignes, Histoire generale des Huns des Turcs et des Mongols, Paris, 1756.
- Jean-Paul Roux, Historie des Turcs, 1984.
- Jean-Paul Roux, Timur, 1994.
- Fayard Paris, Historie des Turcs, 1984.
- D.Sinor, Aspects of Altaic Civilization, 1963.
- M. Barthold, Turkestan down to the Mongol Invansıon, Londra, 1968.
- E. Berl, Historie de l'Europe d'Attila a Tamerlan, Paris, 1946.
- M.A. Czaplıcka, The Turks of Central Asia in History and at the Present Day, Oxford, 1918.
- W. Eberhard, Kultur und Siedlung der Randvölker China, 1942.
- L. Hambis, La Haute-Asie, Paris, 1953.
- Hammer-Purgstall, Von, Historie de l'Empire ottoman depuis son origine jusqu!a nos jours, Paris, 1835.
- H.H. Howorth, History of the Mongols, Londra, 1876.
- Jean-Paul Roux, Türklerin Tarihi – Pasifikten Akdenize 2000 Yıl, 2004

== See also ==
- 16 Great Turkic Empires
- Outline of the Ottoman Empire

== Sources ==
- Adas, Michael (2001). Agricultural and Pastoral Societies in Ancient and Classical History. American Historical Association/Temple University Press.
- Bailey, Harold W. (1985). Indo-Scythian Studies: being Khotanese Texts, VII. Cambridge University Press. JSTOR 312539.
- Beckwith, Christopher I. (16 March 2009). Empires of the Silk Road: A History of Central Eurasia from the Bronze Age to the Present. Princeton University Press. ISBN 978-0-691-13589-2.
- Christian, David (1998). A history of Russia, Central Asia and Mongolia. Vol. 1: Inner Eurasia from prehistory to the Mongol Empire. Blackwell.
- Curta, Florin (2019). "Oghuz, Pechenegs, and Cumans: Nomads of Medieval Eastern Europe?". Eastern Europe in the Middle Ages (500–1300). Vol. 1. Brill. pp. 152–178.
- Di Cosmo, Nicola (2004). Ancient China and its Enemies: The Rise of Nomadic Power in East Asian History. Cambridge University Press. (First paperback edition)
- Geng, Shimin [耿世民] (2005). 阿尔泰共同语、匈奴语探讨 [On Altaic Common Language and Xiongnu Language]. Yu Yan Yu Fan Yi 语言与翻译（汉文版） [Language and Translation] (2). ISSN 1001-0823. OCLC 123501525. Archived from the original on 25 February 2012.
- Guimon, Timofey V. (2021). Historical Writing of Early Rus (c. 1000–c. 1400) in a Comparative Perspective. Brill.
- Harmatta, János (1 January 1994). "Conclusion". In Harmatta, János (ed.). History of Civilizations of Central Asia: The Development of Sedentary and Nomadic Civilizations, 700 B. C. to A. D. 250. UNESCO. pp. 485–492. ISBN 978-9231028465.
- Hucker, Charles O. (1975). China's Imperial Past: An Introduction to Chinese History and Culture. Stanford University Press. ISBN 0-8047-2353-2. "The proto-Turkic Hsiung-nu were now challenged by other alien groups — proto-Tibetans, proto-Mongol tribes called the Hsien-pi, and separate proto-Turks called To-pa (Toba)."
- Jankowski, Henryk [in Polish] (2006). Historical-Etymological Dictionary of Pre-Russian Habitation Names of the Crimea. Handbuch der Orientalistik [HdO], 8: Central Asia; 15. Brill. ISBN 978-90-04-15433-9.
- Lee, Joo-Yup (2016). "The Historical Meaning of the Term Turk and the Nature of the Turkic Identity of the Chinggisid and Timurid Elites in Post-Mongol Central Asia". Central Asiatic Journal. 59 (1–2): 101–132. doi:10.13173/centasiaj.59.1-2.0101. ISSN 0008-9192. JSTOR 10.13173/centasiaj.59.1-2.0101.
