= Duttenhofer =

Duttenhofer is a surname. Notable people with the surname include:

- Christian Duttenhofer (1778–1846), German engraver
- Luise Duttenhofer (1776–1829), German papercutting artist
- Max Duttenhofer (1843–1903), German entrepreneur and industrialist
