= History of the Turks =

The term Turk may refer to either the Turkish peoples in general, or a specific one of these peoples, typically the Turkish people:

- History of the Turkish people
- History of the Turkic peoples
