= Niederstotzingen Castle =

Castle in Germany

Coordinates: 48°32′30″N 10°13′58″E

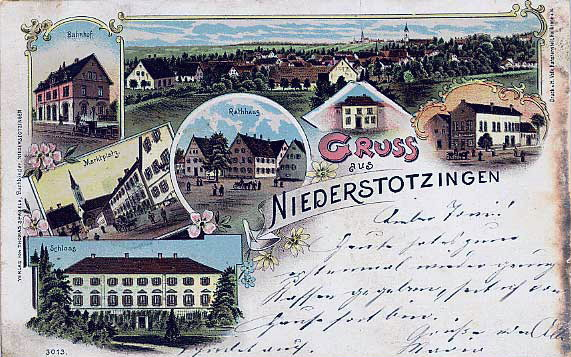
Postcard from Niederstotzingen showing Schloss Niederstotzingen

Niederstotzingen Castle is a Neoclassical residence located in Niederstotzingen in the district of Heidenheim, Baden-Württemberg, Germany.

The new castle was built on the site of the medieval castle. The castle is first mentioned around 1050 in connection with the von Stotzingen family. It was partly destroyed in 1340, and cleared and rebuilt in 1366. The repaired castle was then again destroyed in 1378.

It was built as a new castle around 1530. In 1775-83 it was totally rebuilt and expanded by the Baron vom Stain in its current form. The castle is currently the property of the von Maldeghem family.

== See also ==
- Niederstotzingen
