= Luise Duttenhofer =

German papercutting artist

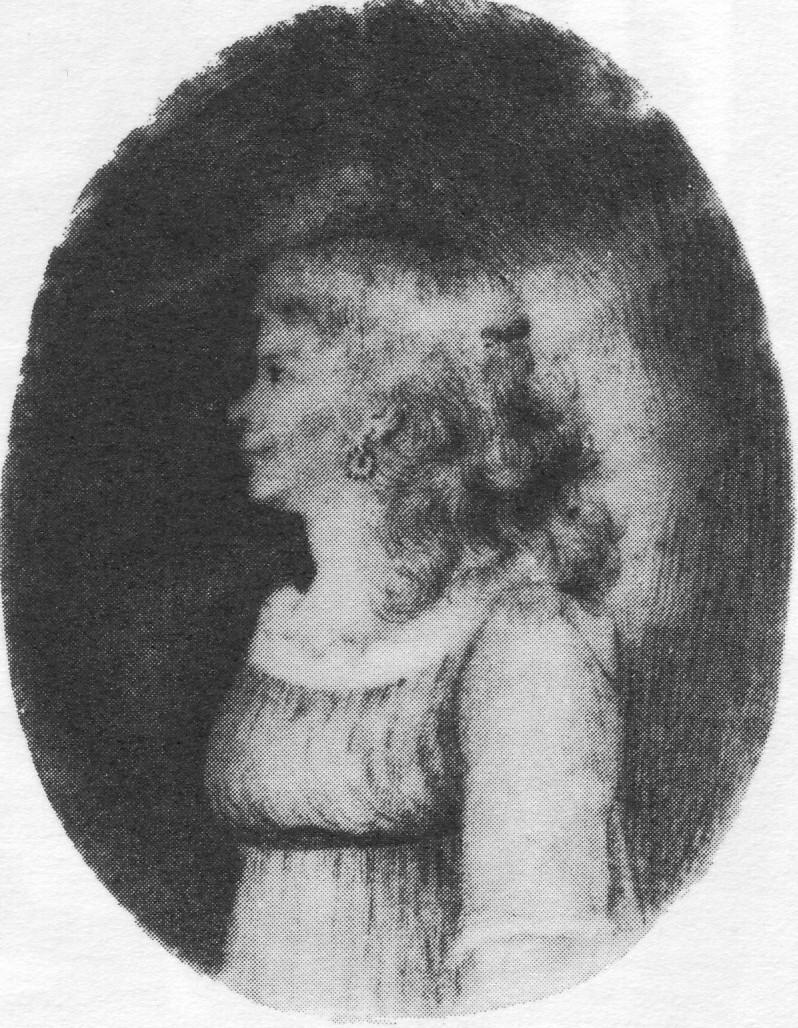
- Pencil drawing of Luise Duttenhofer on ivory, possibly a self portrait
- Born: Christiane Luise Hummel; 5 April 1776; Waiblingen, Duchy of Württemberg
- Died: 16 May 1829 (aged 53); Stuttgart, Kingdom of Württemberg
- Occupation: Papercutting artist
- Spouse: Christian Duttenhofer (m. 1804)
- Children: 7

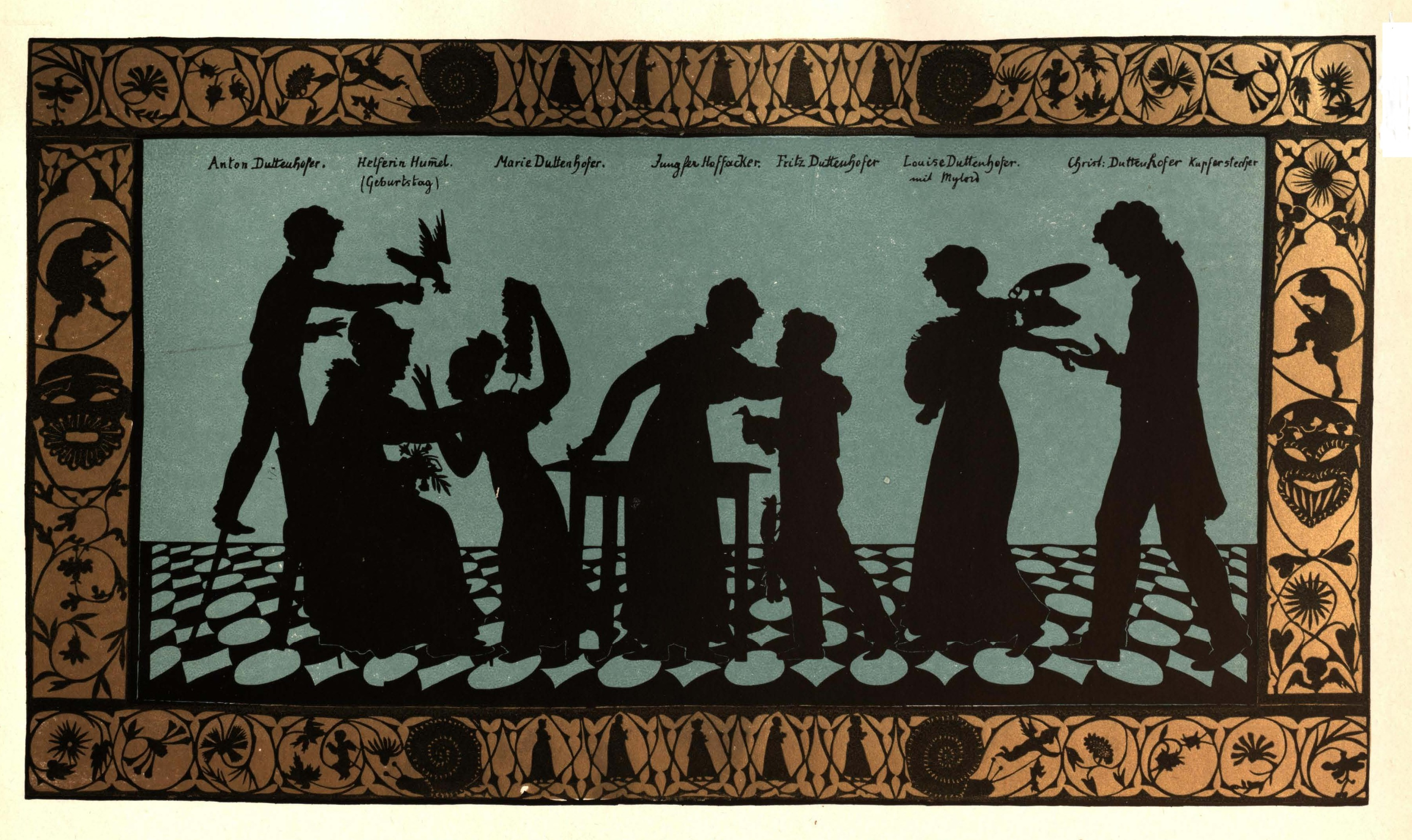
Silhouette paper cutting by Luise Duttenhofer from ca. 1820, showing her husband Christian Friedrich Traugott on the right, their son Anton on the left, and Luise herself second from the right

Christiane Luise Duttenhofer (née Hummel; 5 April 1776 – 16 May 1829) was a German papercutting artist. She was raised in a middle class Protestant family, who gave her some art education but did not permit her to become a professional artist. At the age of 28, she married her cousin, the engraver Christian Duttenhofer. Three of their seven children reached adulthood. After a voyage to Rome around 1805, where they met several German artists and experienced classical antiquity, the couple moved to Stuttgart. There, Duttenhofer was in contact with the educated bourgeoisie and also met famous authors like Jean Paul and Johann Wolfgang von Goethe.

Duttenhofer made many paper cuts, of which more than 1500 are known, including silhouette portraits that were cut freehand. She worked on a wide variety of subjects, for example landscapes, animals and ornaments. Many of her paper cuts feature mythological or religious scenes, while others depict scenes from her everyday life. Her work was shown in two exhibitions in Stuttgart during her lifetime and included in a collection of poetry that she illustrated together with her husband. Her art was largely forgotten after her death, but rediscovered in the early 20th century, when it was exhibited and reprinted multiple times.

== Early life ==
Duttenhofer was born as Christiane Luise Hummel at Kurze Straße 40 in Waiblingen on 5 April 1776. She was the only child of Georg Hummel, a Protestant pastor, and Luise Hedwig (née Spittler). After the 1779 death of her father, she and her mother moved in with her maternal grandparents in Stuttgart, Jakob Friedrich Spittler and his wife Johanna Christine (née Bilfinger). Her grandfather, consistorial councillor and preacher at the Stiftskirche, died on 15 October 1780, as designated prelate of Herrenalb. She was then raised by her mother and grandmother. Her great-uncle, prelate Heinrich Christoph Bilfinger, paid for drawing lessons for Luise, whose talent was visible at an early age, but did not allow her to take up painting. She later regretted not having a more thorough artistic education and would have liked to become a painter, but middle class expectations were that art was a leisure time activity, not a profession. Other than drawing, where she soon surpassed her teacher, she also learned French and literature. She started papercutting as a child, cutting out gothic ornaments similar to the tracery she saw at church.

== Marriage and voyage to Rome ==
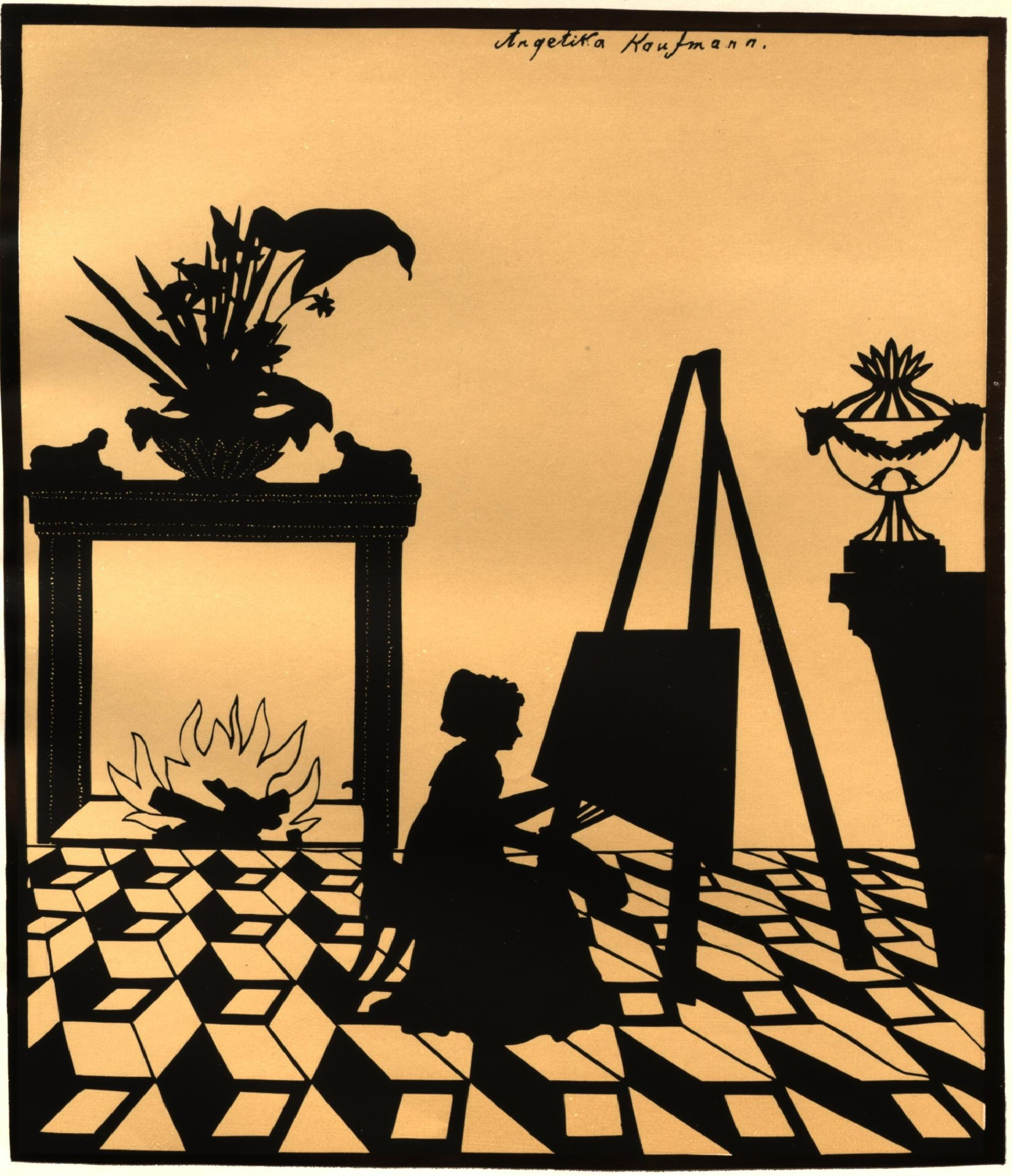
Angelica Kauffman painting, papercut by Duttenhofer

On 27 July 1804, she married her cousin, the engraver Christian Friedrich Traugott Duttenhofer (1778–1846). He also came from a Protestant background: his father was the prelate (and later superintendent) of Heilbronn, Christian Friedrich Duttenhofer, while his mother Johanna Christiana née Hummel was a sister of Luise's father. Christian Duttenhofer had studied art at the Dresden Academy of Fine Arts under Johann Christian Klengel and at the Academy of Fine Arts Vienna. After the wedding, the couple travelled to Rome, where they stayed for 18 months, meeting many German artists, including Joseph Anton Koch, Gottlieb Schick, Johann Christian Reinhart, Johann Martin Wagner and Angelica Kauffman. Besides the interaction with these artists, another influence on Duttenhofer's art was the experience of classical antiquity as well as the Italian Renaissance. In 1805, the first child of the Duttenhofers was born, the son Carl Aurel, but he died soon after birth. Luise Duttenhofer made two papercuts documenting the experience, one showing herself in bed while little gnomes carry away her infant son, another one of her son's corpse on a bier.

== Life in Stuttgart ==
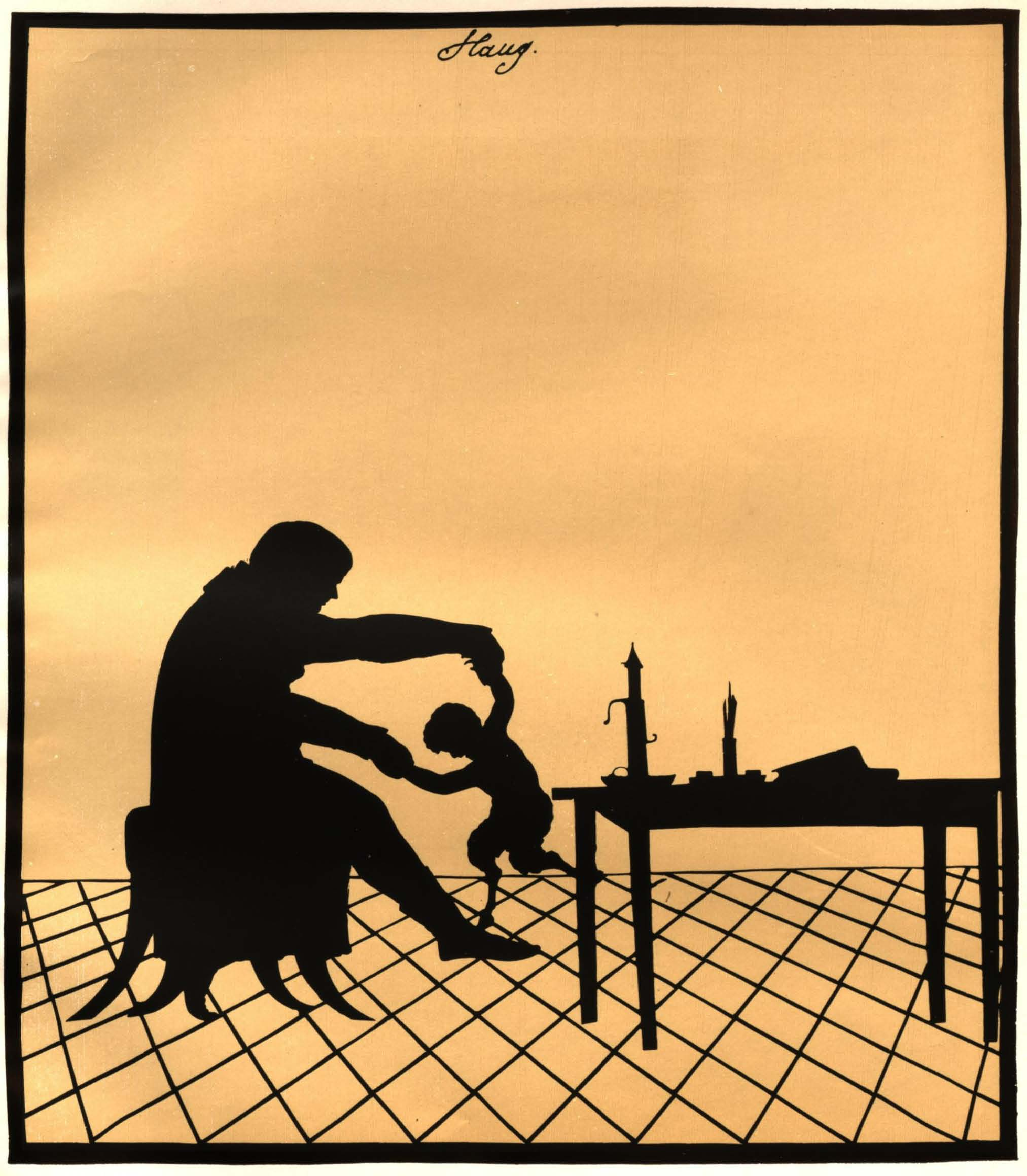
Friedrich Haug with a faun, papercut by Duttenhofer

Duttenhofer and her husband moved to Stuttgart in 1805 or 1806, where Christian Duttenhofer worked as an engraver. He did not produce his own artwork, but made reproductions of the work of other artists. In contrast, Luise Duttenhofer was creative and original in her paper cutting. She was supported by Johann Heinrich von Dannecker, a sculptor in whose workshop she made drawings based on his collection of copies of antiques that included copies of artwork brought to Paris by Napoleon as well as copies of the Parthenon Marbles. The central meeting point of the Stuttgart Bildungsbürgertum was the house of August von Hartmann (later of his son-in-law Georg Reinbeck), where Duttenhofer was in contact with many local intellectuals as well as visitors including Jean Paul and Johann Wolfgang von Goethe. Her local friends included the poet Karl Mayer, the Morgenblatt editor Friedrich Haug and the art historian Ludwig von Schorn. She influenced the papercutting artist Claire von Greyerz, whose work includes similar embossing techniques to Duttenhofer's, and the two women swapped papercuts. They may have met when von Greyerz stayed with Karl Mayer in 1813.

Duttenhofer had six further children in Stuttgart, with three of them reaching adulthood: Marie Luise (1807–1839), Friedrich Martin (1810–1859) and Anton Raphael (1812–1843). The three youngest children all died early: Peter Alexis (1814–1815), Cornelie Georgine (1816–1816) and Emil Georg Albert (1818–1819).

From November 1828, Duttenhofer, her husband and two of the children spent a few months in Munich, where she made drawings from works in various galleries and collections. She died shortly after her return to Stuttgart, on 16 May 1829.

== Work ==
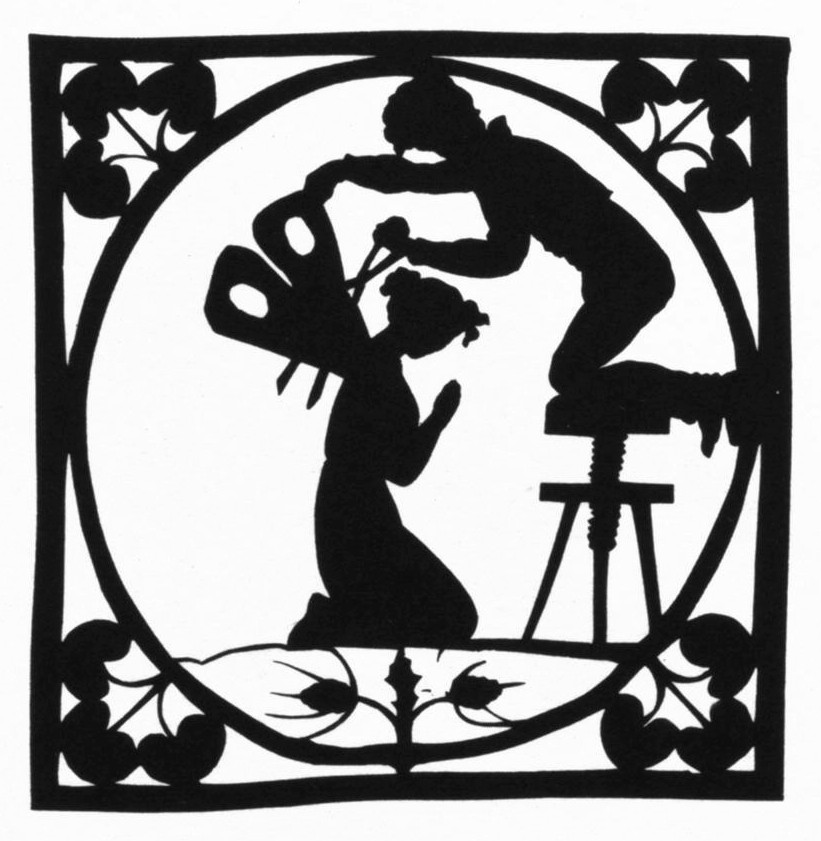
Duttenhofer as Psyche, who is having her wings cut

Duttenhofer made many paper cuts; more than 1500 are known. The subjects cover a wide range, including portraits, landscapes, animals as well as ornaments. Many of her portraits have aspects of caricature. She often worked on religious or mythological topics, but also cut scenes from her own everyday life. Duttenhofer's silhouettes were usually free-hand cuts made without preparatory drawings, differentiating her from most other silhouettists. She usually cut in folded paper, creating two paper cuts that were mirror images of each other. Some of the extant cuts show mirrored writing, making it plausible that Duttenhofer gave away the correctly oriented papercut and kept the mirror image for her archives. The paper used was typically black on the front and white on the back, but sometimes she employed coloured paper as well. Some of the larger works are composed of several pieces of paper. One of her innovations was the use of perspective to create a three dimensional effect, especially by means of patterned floors.

Duttenhofer exhibited some of her work in Stuttgart in 1812 and in 1824. Both times, her works were mentioned and she was praised for her virtuosity in reports of the exhibition in the Morgenblatt. The only publication including her work during her lifetime was an 1821 collection of poems by Christian Gottlob Vischer, illustrated by Duttenhofer and her husband. In 1826, she participated in a competition to illustrate one of Goethe's poems, receiving Goethe's praise for her entry.

== Legacy ==
Duttenhofer was the most important silhouettist of her age in Germany, but her work was mostly forgotten after her death and only re-discovered in the early 20th century by the art historian Gustav Edmund Pazaurek and exhibited in Düsseldorf in 1909. Her descendants gave most of her oeuvre to the Schiller-Nationalmuseum: 337 folio pages containing at least one papercut each were donated to the same museum by Otto Tafel in 1911 and 1933. Duttenhofer's papercuts have been exhibited several times and reprinted in various editions.
