= Oberstotzingen Castle =

Castle in Niederstotzingen, Baden-Württemberg, Germany

Coordinates: 48°32′27″N 10°13′12″E

Oberstotzingen Castle is located at the north end of Niederstotzingen in the district of Heidenheim, Baden-Württemberg, Germany. At present it is a hotel and restaurant, though both are currently closed.

The site is first mentioned in 1286, though the castle was built around 1300 by the von Stotzingen family. The castle was first expanded in 1500–50, followed by further expansions in 1608-10 and 1747–51. During its history the castle was also owned by the von Sontheim, von Jarsdorf, and von Ungelter families.

During World War II the castle was used to house displaced Jews by the Nazi government.

Every year around Easter, concerts are presented in the castle during weekends as part of the Niederstotzinger Musiktage ("Niederstotzingen Music Days").

== See also ==
- Niederstotzingen
