= Kaltenburg Castle =

Coordinates: 48°34′53″N 10°12′42″E

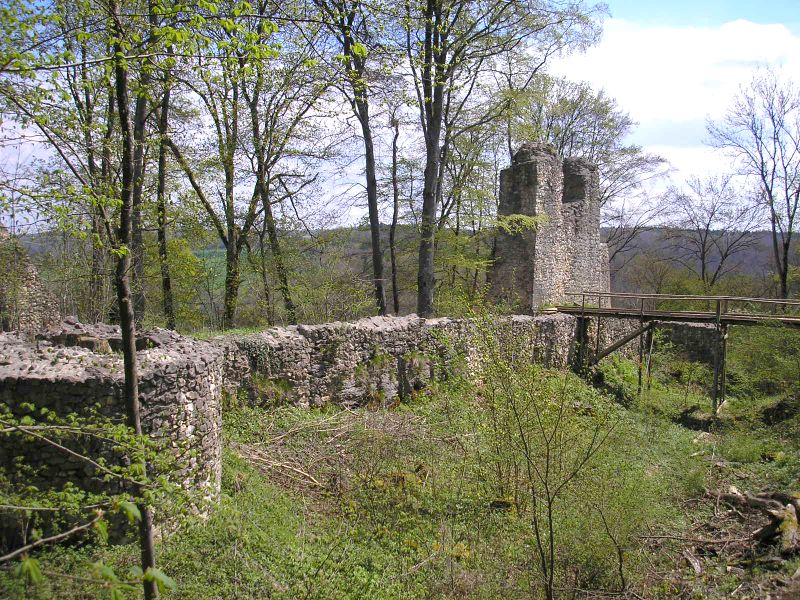
Southwest curtain wall and tower

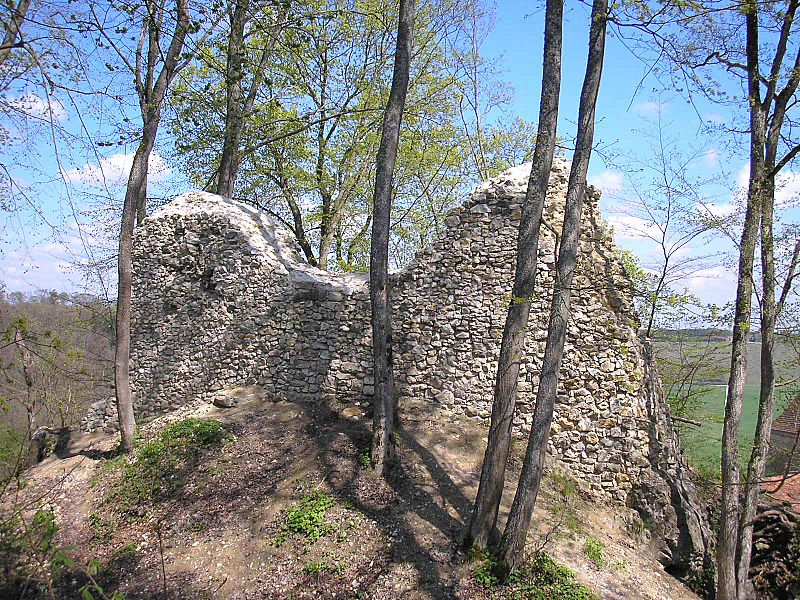
Romanesque keep in the northwest.

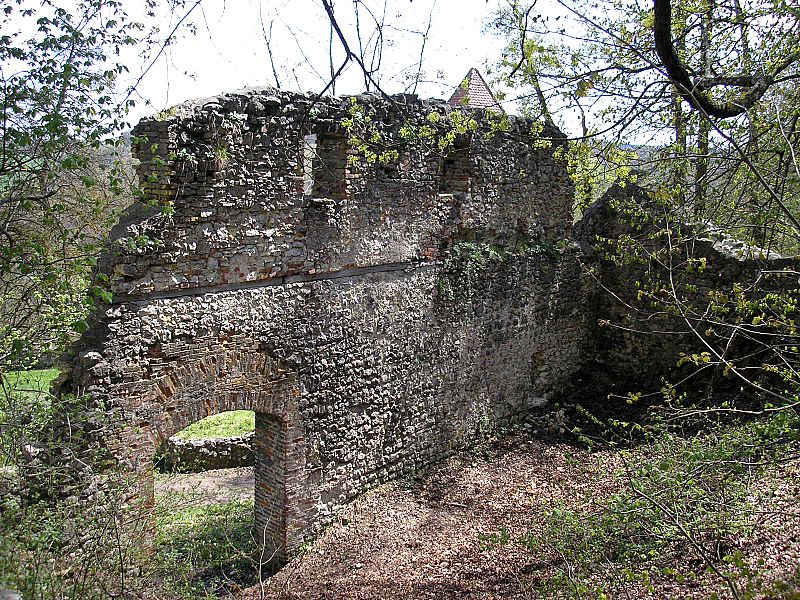
Southwest wall of the second castle

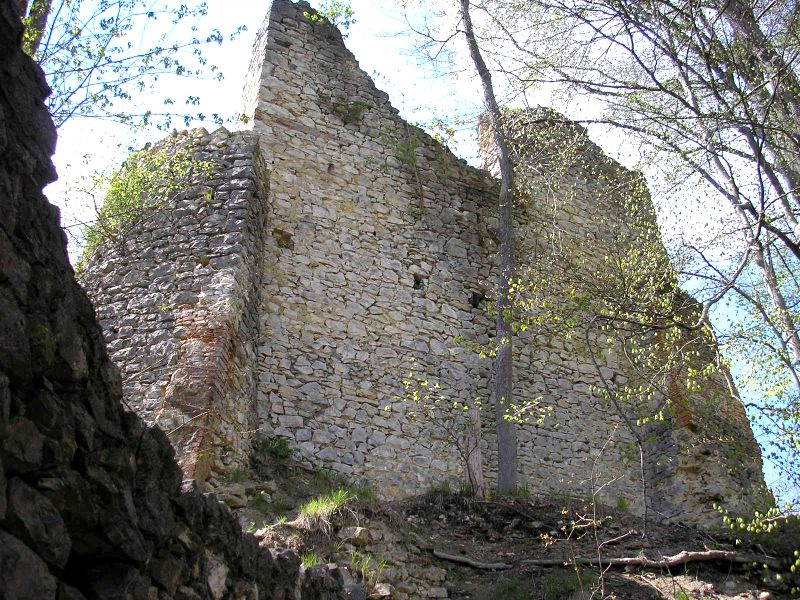
Inner face of the southwest wall

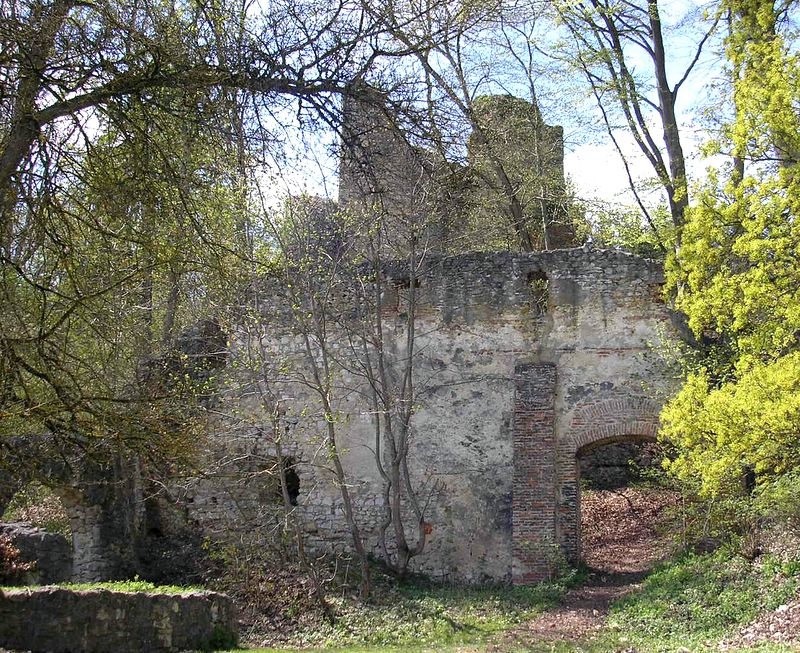
Gatehouse with curtain walls of the second castle

Kaltenburg Castle is a ruined castle, located in the Lonetal (Lone River Valley) between the cities of Giengen and Niederstotzingen in the district of Heidenheim, Baden-Württemberg, Germany. The castle was built during the High Middle Ages and though ruined, most of the walls are intact.

== Location ==
The ruin is situated about 60 m above the confluence of the Hürbe and Lone rivers in the Lone valley. About 500 m north of the castle is the Charlottenhöhle one of the longest caves in Schwäbischen Alb.

== History ==
The name of the castle appears to come from the name of the castle founder Heinrich von Kalden also known as Bappenheim or Pappenheim, who was the Reichshofmarschall or Marshal of the Empire under Emperor Frederick II. The castle was built some time between 1150 and 1180.

Under the Hohenstaufen kings the rulers of Kaltenburg swore fealty only to the Emperor, an unusual privilege for a German noble. In 1240 Dietmar is mentioned in connection with the castle. While in 1265 Otto von Kaltenburg is mentioned as the ruler. By 1332 the castle is owned by Graf or Count von Helfenstein. The count's landvogt or administrator was Heinz Vetzer who lived in the tower.

In 1357 the castle was held by the von Riedheim family. They had received the castle either as a loan from the Duchy of Bavaria or they were serving as a landvogt or administrator for the Imperial City of Ulm. During the 15th century several nobles occupied the castle including the von Grafeneck and Stadion families.

The castle was besieged and severely damaged in 1435 by troops from Nürnberg. A second destruction occurred in 1632–34 during the Thirty Years' War. It was rebuilt in 1677 by the von Riedheim family.

However, in 1764 the south west wall collapsed. The towers were dismantled and transported to Reuendorf to build a storage building.

After portions of the castle collapsed the castle church was destroyed in 1804. Two years later portions of the inner castle were dismantled, with more portions collapsing in 1806. When the castle was taken over by the Graf von Maldeghem in 1820, five families lived in the castle. After 1837 30 inhabitants were mentioned to still live in the castle. After 1897 it appears that only the gatehouse was still intact and occupied.

The first attempts to conserve the ruins happened in 1938 and 1940. This process continued in 1980 and 1983. During this period, the two square towers were cleaned and rebuilt.

== Castle grounds ==
The construction of the castle occurred in four, still visible, stages. The castle from the 12th century was really only a tower house located on a rocky outcrop. In the 13th and 14th century the site was expanded to its current size. From 1450 until 1560 it was expanded once again. Finally, after the destruction of the Thirty Years' War, it was rebuilt in 1677 and the two remaining square towers were added.

The irregular pentagon shape of the curtain wall was protected by the two remaining square towers and three or possibly four round towers. On the flatter hill side, the walls were protected by angular 5 m (16 ft) deep and 10–16 m (33–52 ft) wide moat. The gatehouse was located in the south near a steep cliff.

In the north west, under the ruins of the outer wall, a part of the older moat is still visible. On the plateau a 4 m (13 ft) high and about 16 m (52 ft) long piece of the curtain wall remains. The buildings of the first and second construction phases are almost all gone, only a few stones indicate where the 13 m (43 ft) high tower once was. The 3.4 m (11 ft) thick curtain wall was once part of the east wall of the square tower house of the first castle. The keep of the second castle was likely located to the west on a deeper section of bedrock.

The curtain wall of the 13th/14th-century castle is nearly all gone, except for the south wall with a gate house. On the southwest corner the wall of the tower house is still visible. The construction is 10 m (33 ft)m long and still 7–8 m (23–26 ft) high and about 2.2 m (7.2 ft) thick. The outer walls with the foundations of the round towers on the hill side, have been extensively restored and repaired. They reflect the condition of the castle in the 16th century. On the valley side, the two tall square towers date from the 1677 reconstruction. The towers, crowned with pyramidal roofs, are visible across the valley.

== See also ==
- List of castles in Baden-Württemberg
- Niederstotzingen
