= Mah Malek Khatun =

Seljuk princess and wife of caliph al-Muqtadi

Mah Malek Khatun ماه ملک خاتون
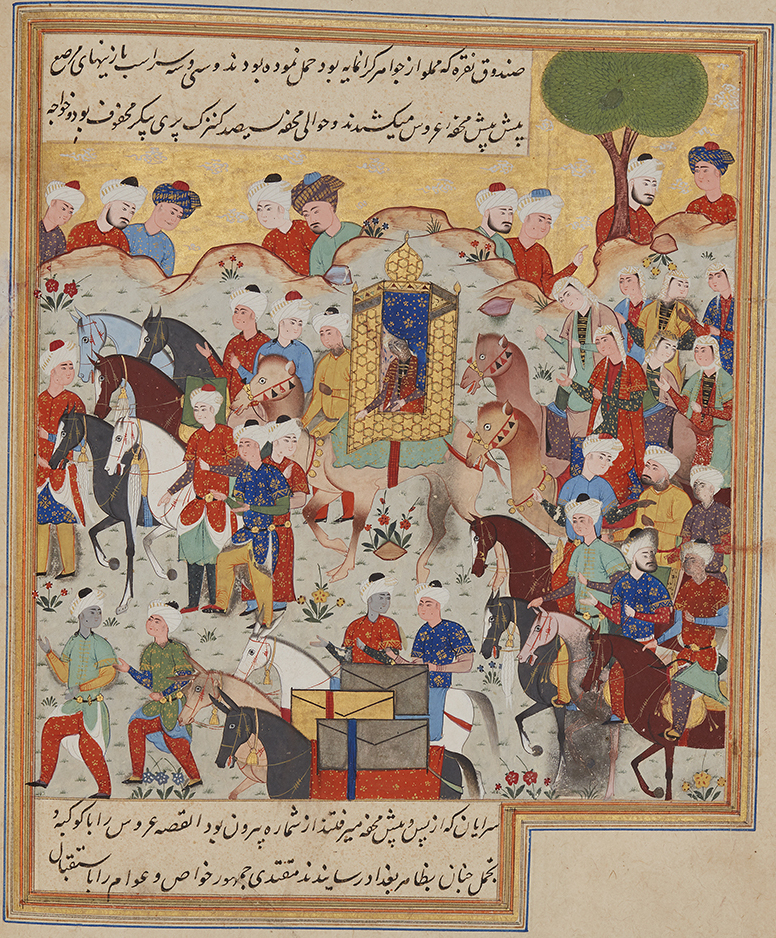
- Mah Malek depicted in the center of a procession from Isfahan to Baghdad, for her upcoming marriage to Caliph Muqtadi in 1087. Nizam al-Mulk is also depicted accompanying the procession. Folio from a manuscript of Nigaristan, Iran, probably Shiraz, dated 1573-74.

Consort of the Abbasid caliph
- Tenure: 1082 – 1089
- Born: Isfahan
- Died: 1089; Isfahan
- Burial: Isfahan
- Spouse: Al-Muqtadi
- Children: Ja'far ibn Abdallah al-Muqtadi
Names
- Mah Malek Khatun Malik Shah
Era name and dates
- Later Abbasid era: 11th century
- Dynasty: Seljuk
- Father: Malik Shah
- Mother: Terken Khatun
- Religion: Sunni Islam

Mah Malek Khatun (Persian: ماه ملک خاتون) was a Seljuk princess, daughter of sultan Malik Shah, sister of sultan Mahmud I and the second wife of Abbasid caliph Al-Muqtadi.

== Biography ==
Mah Malek Khatun was one of Malik Shah's daughters; her mother was Terken Khatun, She married Abbasid Caliph al-Muqtadi in 1082.

In 1082, the caliph sent Fakhr ad-Dawla to Isfahan, laden with gifts and over 20,000 dinars, to negotiate marriage with Malik-Shah's daughter. Malik-Shah was grieving the death of his son Da'ud and did not take part in the negotiations; rather, Fakhr ad-Dawla went to Nizam al-Mulk. The two worked together this time; they went to the princess's mother, Terken Khatun, to make their request. She was disinterested at first because the Ghaznavid ruler had made a better offer: 100,000 dinars. Arslan Khatun, who had been married to al-Qa'im, told her that a marriage with the caliph would be more prestigious, and that she should not be asking the caliph for more money.

Eventually, Terken Khatun agreed to the marriage, but with heavy conditions imposed on al-Muqtadi: in return for marrying the Seljuk princess, al-Muqtadi would pay 50,000 dinars plus an additional 100,000 dinars as mahr (bridal gift), give up his current wife (Sifri Khatun, Malik's sister) and concubines, and agree to not have sexual relations with any other woman. This was an especially heavy significant burden on the Abbasid caliph, since the Abbasids had been tightly controlling their "reproductive politics", with all their heirs being born to umm walads, slave-concubines of the Abbasid harem, and therefore unrelated to any rival dynasties. By agreeing to Terken Khatun's terms, Fakhr ad-Dawla was putting al-Muqtadi at a severe disadvantage while also benefitting the Seljuks considerably.

Mah Malek became al-Muqtadi's second wife. Her father gave his consent, and the marriage contract was concluded. She arrived Baghdad in March 1087. The marriage was consummated in May 1087. She gave birth to prince Ja'far on 31 January 1088. But then Al-Muqtadi began to avoid her and she asked permission to return home. She left Baghdad for Khurasan on 29 May 1089, accompanied by her son. Subsequently, news of her death reached Baghdad. Her ailing father brought her son back to Baghdad in October 1092. Ja'far was taken back to the Caliphal palace, where he remained until his death on 21 June 1093. He was buried near the caliphal tombs in the Rusafah Cemetery.

== See also ==
- Sifri Khatun
- Ismah Khatun

== Sources ==
- El-Hibri, T. (2021). The Abbasid Caliphate: A History. Cambridge University Press.
- al-Sāʿī, Ibn; Toorawa, Shawkat M.; Bray, Julia (2017). كتاب جهات الأئمة الخلفاء من الحرائر والإماء المسمى نساء الخلفاء: Women and the Court of Baghdad. Library of Arabic Literature. NYU Press.
- Hanne, Eric (2008). "The Banu Jahir and Their Role in the Abbasid and Saljuq Administrations".
