= Sifri Khatun =

Seljuk princess and wife of caliph al-Muqtadi

Sifri Khatun سفری خاتون

Consort of the Abbasid caliph
- Predecessor: Khadija Arslan Khatun (wife of al-Qa'im)
- Successor: Mah Malek Khatun (wife of al-Muqtadi)
- Born: 1050s/60s
- Died: Baghdad
- Burial: Baghdad
- Spouse: Al-Muqtadi
Names
- Sifri Khatun Arslan
Era name and dates
- Later Abbasid era: 11th century
- Dynasty: Seljuk
- Father: Alp Arslan
- Mother: Safariyya Khatun
- Religion: Sunni Islam

Sifri Khatun (Persian: سفری خاتون) was a Seljuk princess, daughter of sultan Alp Arslan (r. 1063–1072), sister of Malik-Shah I (r. 1072–1092) and the first wife of Abbasid caliph al-Muqtadi (r. 1075–1094).

== Biography ==
One of Alp Arslan's wives in the Seljuk harem was Safariyya Khatun. She had a daughter, Sifri Khatun. Her mother, Safariyya died in Isfahan in 1073–4.

Sifri Khatun in 1071–72, married Abbasid caliph Al-Muqtadi. In 1071–72, the grandfather of al-Muqtadi, Al-Qa'im, sent his vazir Ibn Al-Jahir to ask her hand in marriage, to which demand the Sultan agreed. She married Abdallah ibn Muhammad (future Al-Muqtadi) and the marriage was consummated shortly after.

This marriage was politically important for the caliph because it gave him power over the Seljuk territories. As the ruling caliph was also related to the ruling Seljuk sultan through marriage. However, her father, Alp Arslan, died shortly after her marriage in 1072, and her husband al-Muqtadi married another Seljuk princess a decade later.

Al-Muqtadi's second wife was Mah Malek Khatun, daughter of Sultan Malik-Shah I. In March 1082, Al-Muqtadi sent Abu Nasr ibn Jahir to Malik Shah in Isfahan to ask for her hand in marriage. Her father gave his consent, and the marriage contract was concluded. She arrived in Baghdad on March 1087. The marriage was consummated in May 1087, and she entered the Abbasid harem. She gave birth to Prince Ja'far on 31 January 1088. This second marriage also proved beneficial to al-Muqtadi's political power as it made al-Muqtadi both the brother-in-law and son-in-law of Malik-Shah.

Even though Sifri Khatun remained as the first wife of al-Muqtadi, she didn't remain influential, as her niece Mah Malek Khatun was the daughter of the ruling Seljuk sultan.

== Sources ==
- El-Hibri, T. (2021). The Abbasid Caliphate: A History. Cambridge University Press.
- Lambton, A.K.S. (1988). Continuity and Change in Medieval Persia. Bibliotheca Persica. Bibliotheca Persica. ISBN 978-0-88706-133-2.
- al-Sāʿī, Ibn; Toorawa, Shawkat M.; Bray, Julia (2017). كتاب جهات الأئمة الخلفاء من الحرائر والإماء المسمى نساء الخلفاء: Women and the Court of Baghdad. Library of Arabic Literature. NYU Press.
