= Christian Duttenhofer =

German engraver

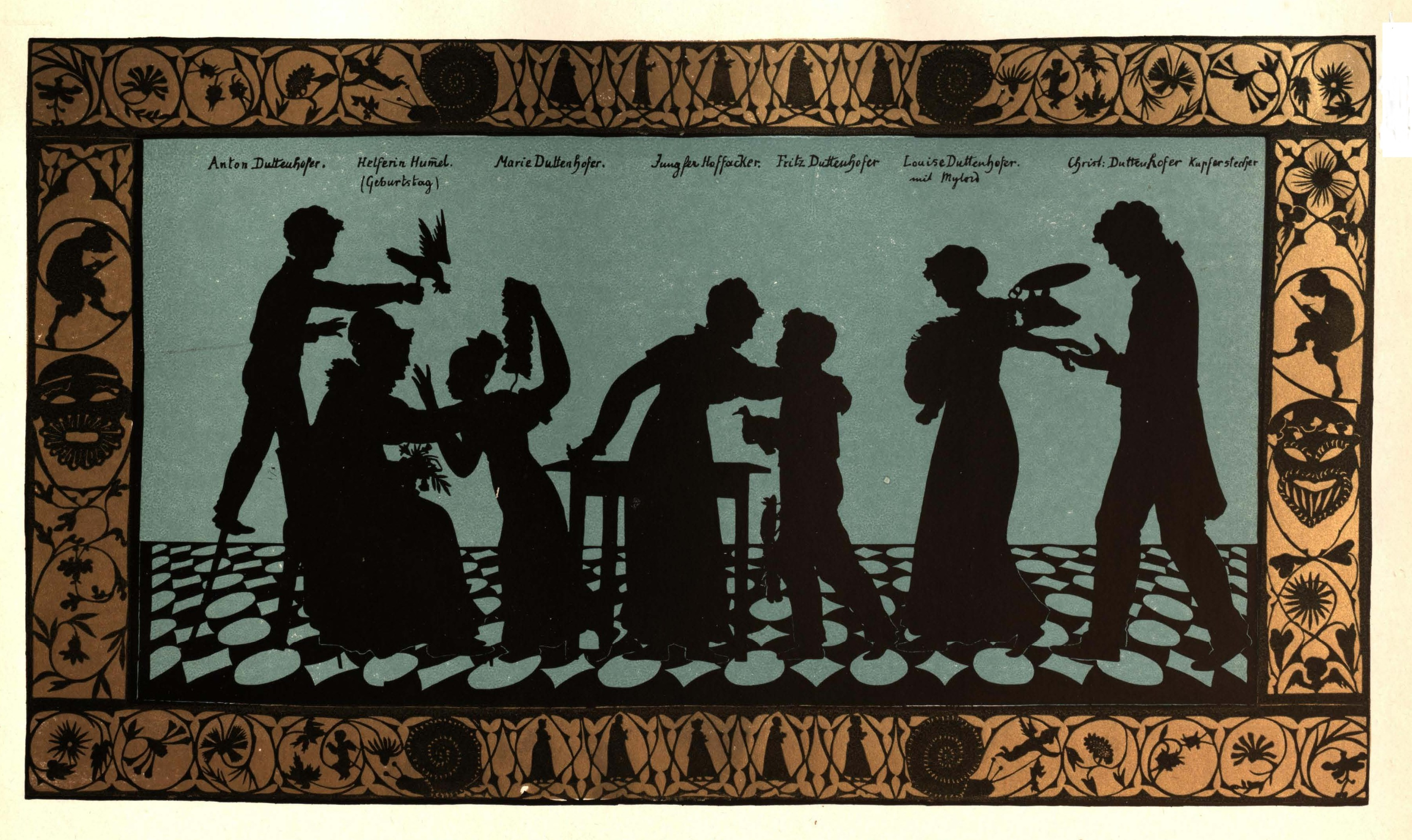
Silhouette paper cutting by Luise Duttenhofer from ca. 1820, showing her husband Christian Friedrich Traugott to the right, their son Anton to the left, and Luise herself second to the right

Christian Friedrich Traugott Duttenhofer (4 August 1778 – 16 April 1846) was a German engraver.

Duttenhofer was born at Gronau in Württemberg in 1778. He studied under Johann Christian Klengel at Dresden, and is chiefly known by his landscapes after Lorrain, Poussin, Annibale Carracci, P. Bril, and various views in Tyrol. He also copied Woollett's print of Solitude, after Wilson, and was one of the artists employed on the Musée Napoléon. He died at Heilbronn in 1846. His son, Anton Duttenhofer, who was likewise an engraver, and was a pupil of his father, died at Stuttgart in 1843, at the age of 31. His wife was papercutting artist Luise Duttenhofer.

== Life ==
Christian Duttenhofer was born in Gronau on August 4, 1778, the son of the Lutheran pastor Christian Friedrich Duttenhofer and his wife Johanna Christiane Duttenhofer née Hummel (1752-1814). His brother Carl (Rudolph Heinrich) Duttenhofer (1784-1805), six years younger, studied architecture and died in Rome at the youthful age of 21. Two other siblings born before Christian died in infancy. Christian's father was appointed preacher in Heilbronn a year after Christian's birth, became the first dean in Württemberg in 1803, and was appointed general superintendent in 1810. Christian's center of life remained the city of Heilbronn until his marriage in 1804.

=== Childhood and youth ===
Already in his childhood and youth, Duttenhofer "laid the foundation for his scientific and artistic education, for he felt an irresistible inclination toward painting and draftsmanship, and especially engraving, and soon excelled in the latter arts as well." At a young age, he went to Stuttgart for further education, but stayed there only briefly because he "found that he had too little opportunity to learn anything here."

=== Studies and career entry ===
After his Stuttgart stay (it is not known when or for how long), Duttenhofer went to Dresden. There he studied at the Academy of Art as a student of the landscape painter Johann Christian Klengel, with whom he also enjoyed drawing lessons. He eagerly visited the famous Gemäldegalerie (Picture Gallery) and the Kupferstichkabinett (Museum of Prints and Drawings), where he trained himself on the old masters. In 1802 at the latest, rather earlier, he transferred to the Vienna Art Academy to continue his studies.
