= Friedrich Haug =

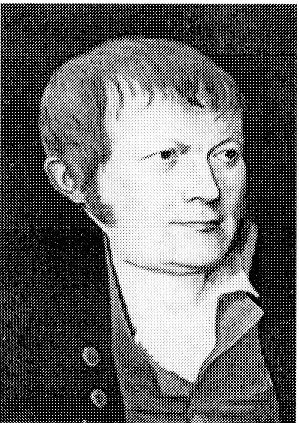
Johann Christoph Friedrich Haug

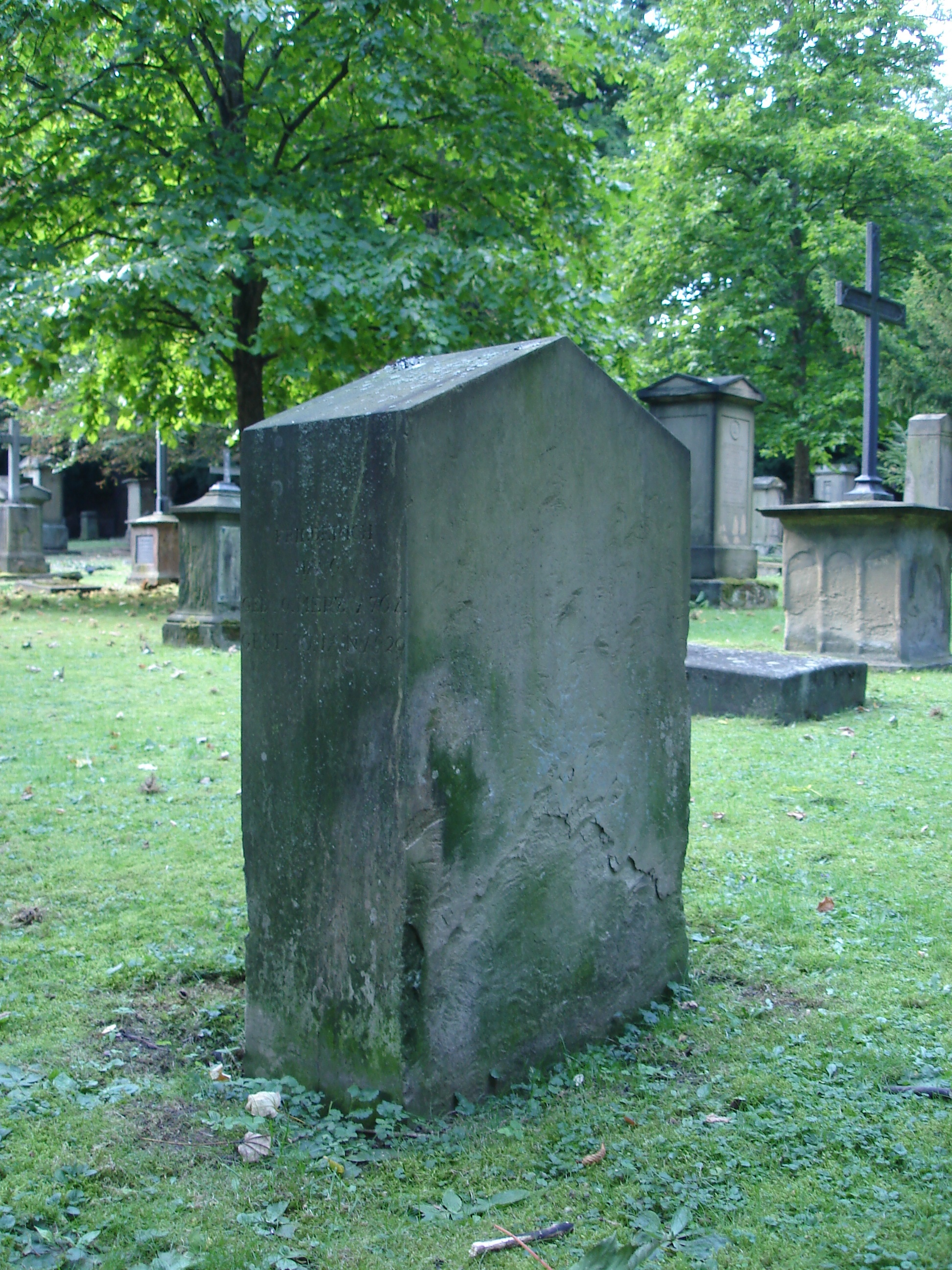
Haug's grave in the Stuttgart Hoppenlau cemetery

Friedrich Haug (Johann Christoph Friedrich Haug, born 9 March 1761 in Niederstotzingen, died 30 January 1829 in Stuttgart) was a German official and poet.

== Biography ==
Haug is renowned particularly through his large number of epigrams, which he initially published under the name "Hophthalmos" (Sinngedichte, Frankfurt 1791; Epigrrams and Mixed Poems, Berlin 1805). From 1811 to 1817 he was the editor in charge of Cotta's Morgenblatt. With Friedrich Christoph Weisser, he published an epigrammatic anthology (Stuttgart 1807–1809, 10 vols.). He also published fables, ballads, and stories.

Friedrich Haug was the son of Balthasar Haug, a teacher at the Karlsschule. In 1775, Haug attended this institute to study law. In 1784 he became secretary in the Ducal Secret Cabinet and court councillor and librarian in Stuttgart in 1817. Haug died on 30 January 1829.
