= Niederstotzingen =

- Town
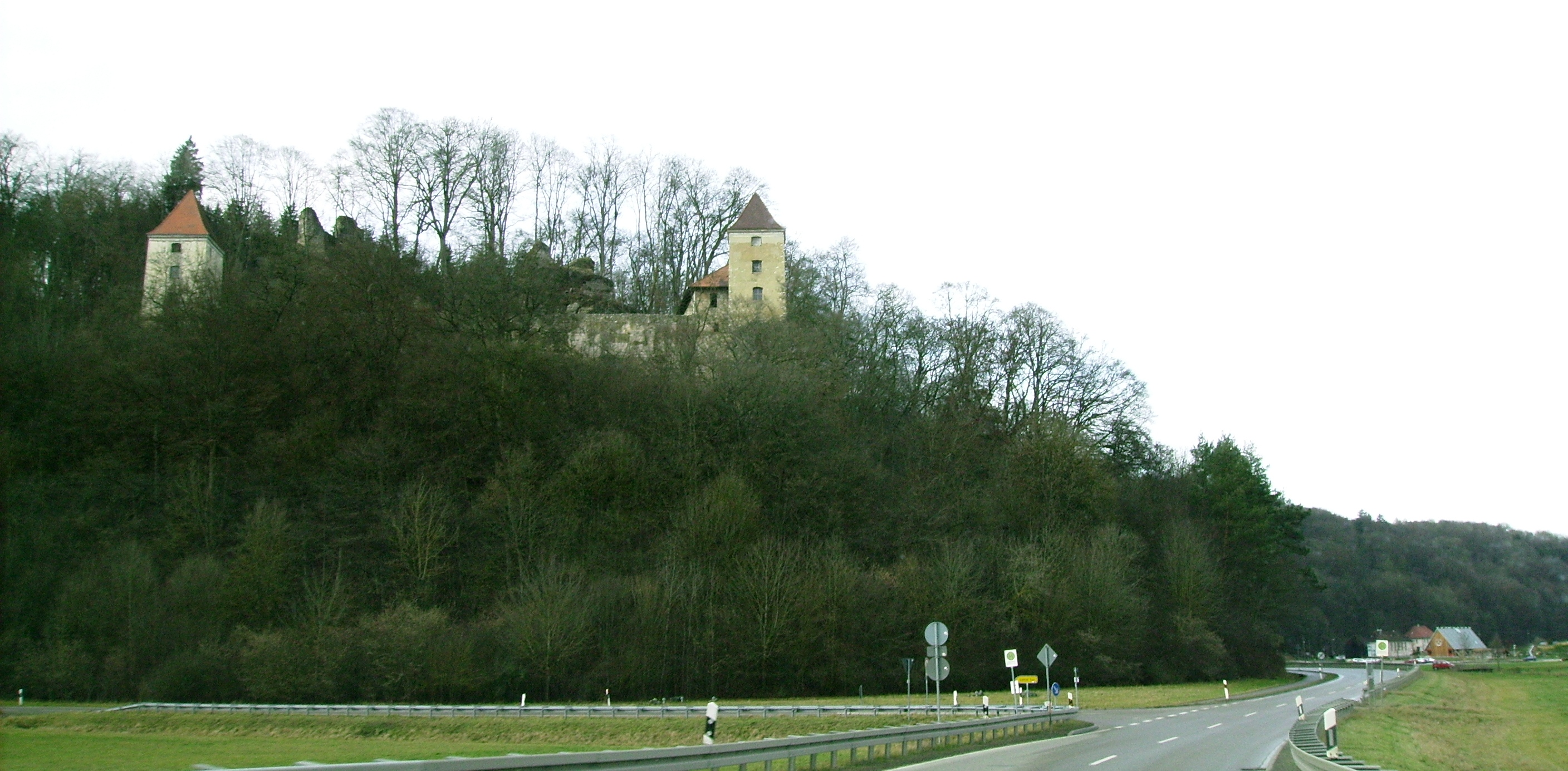
- Kaltenburg

- Coat of arms

- Location of Niederstotzingen within Heidenheim district
- Interactive map of Niederstotzingen
- Location within Germany Location within Baden-Württemberg
- Coordinates: 48°32′28″N 10°13′59″E
- Country: Germany
- State: Baden-Württemberg
- Admin. region: Stuttgart
- District: Heidenheim

Government
  - Mayor (2016–24): Marcus Bremer

Area
  - Total: 29.81 km^{2} (11.51 sq mi)
- Elevation: 473 m (1,552 ft)

Population (2025-12-31)
  - Total: 4,909
  - Density: 164.7/km^{2} (426.5/sq mi)
- Time zone: UTC+01:00 (CET)
  - Summer (DST): UTC+02:00 (CEST)
- Postal codes: 89168
- Dialling codes: 07325
- Vehicle registration: HDH
- Website: www.stadt-niederstotzingen.de

Niederstotzingen (German: [niːdɐˈʃtɔtsɪŋən]) is a small city in the district of Heidenheim in Baden-Württemberg in southern Germany. It is situated 17 km southeast of Heidenheim, and 24 km northeast of Ulm. The city consists of four sections or villages; Niederstotzingen, Oberstotzingen, Stetten ob Lontal and the combined section Lontal und Reuendorf. There are 4,850 inhabitants.

== History ==
=== Vogelherdhöhle ===
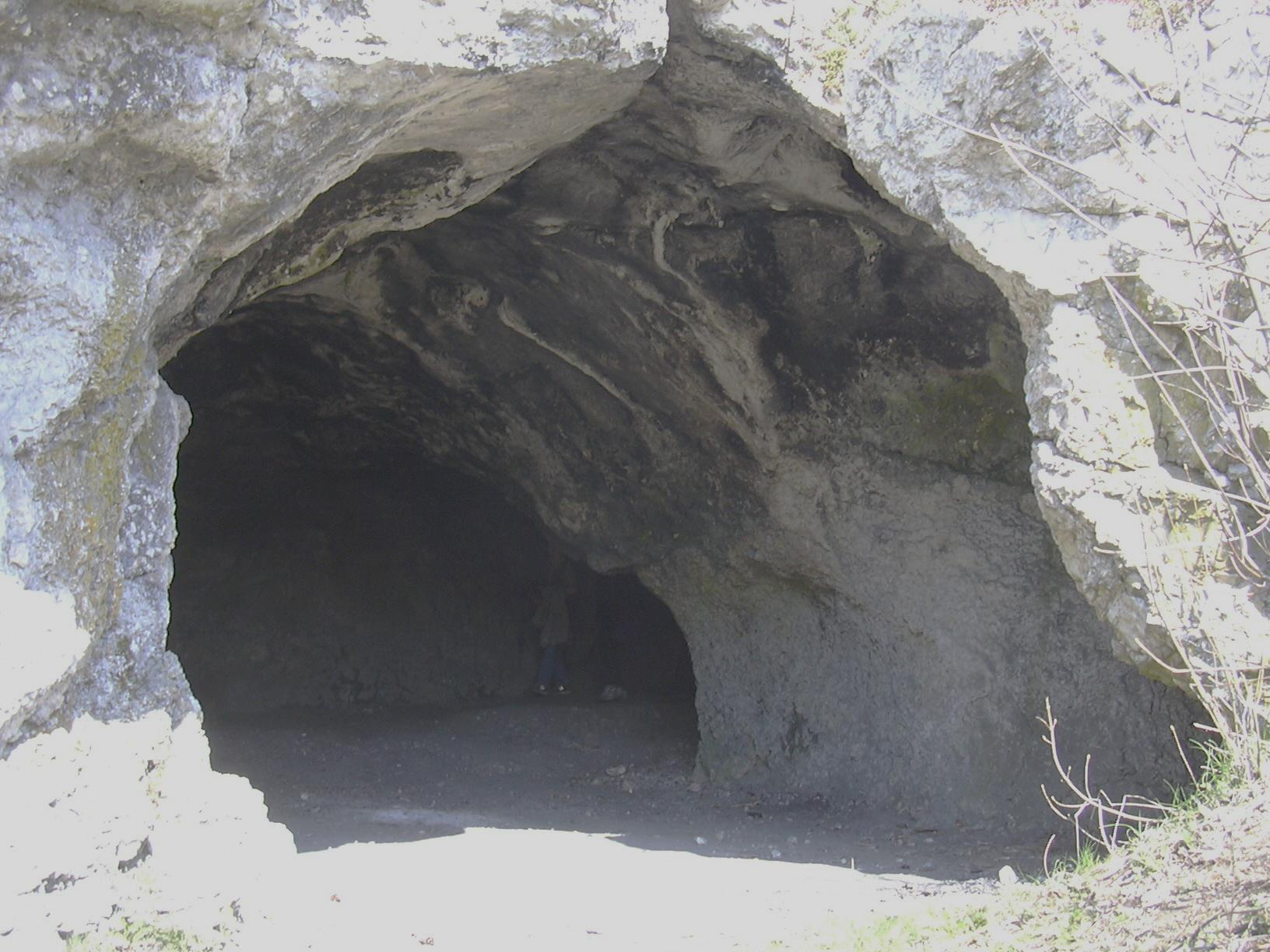
Entrance to the Vogelherdhöhle a prehistoric camp site

The region around Niederstotzingen has been inhabited since pre-historic times. Finds of mammoth ivory carvings in the area have been dated to 35,000 BC. The main source of these carvings is the Vogelherdhöhle, a cave near modern Niederstotzingen which may have been used as a rest area and shelter for nearly 30,000 years.

The cave was discovered in 1931 by a senior railroad clerk and historian, Hermann Mohn, as he explored the hills above the city. An expedition in 1931, led by Gustav Riek, discovered eleven carved animal figures that dated from around 32,000 years ago. A 2005–2006 expedition by the University of Tübingen discovered several additional statues including one, an ivory horse, which may be one of the oldest human artworks in the world. In 2006 another sculpture was discovered. This one, a mammoth carved from mammoth ivory, was dated from 35,000 years ago, making it the oldest artwork in the world.

Additionally, nearby caves in the Lonetal (Lone valley) have sources of ancient carvings (see Lion man). The Lone valley may have even been home to two different types of humans. It appears likely that both the Neanderthal and the Cro-Magnon may have occupied the valley. Professor Riek, who discovered many of the early carvings, wrote a documentary novel entitled Die Mammutjäger im Lonetal (Mammoth hunters in the Lone Valley) which included violent conflicts between the Bärentöter (Bear Killers or Neanderthal) and the Mammutjäger (Mammoth Hunters or Homo Sapiens).

=== Roman Era ===
Before the Romans entered Germania, the Celts occupied the Lone Valley. A Celtic Viereckschanze or "four-sided earthworks" has been discovered near modern Niederstotzingen. From the Roman era, a villa rustica (or Roman Farm) has been discovered between Niederstotzingen and Sontheim. The villa was located along the old Roman road that lead from Urspring to Regensburg.

=== Middle Ages ===
During construction in the south part of town, in 1962, a small cemetery from the later half of the 7th century was discovered. The Alamannian cemetery contained the remains of several nobles as well as their animals and valuables.

The name Stotzingin first appears in 1143, though the meaning of the name is still not clear. During the High Middle Ages, a minor noble family named itself after the city. The family, which is still in existence, ruled Niederstotzingen until 1330. In 1366 Emperor Charles IV gave Niederstotzingen to Wilhelm von Riedheim with a directive to expand and fortify the city. The city was granted the status of a city which it has held ever since (except for a short interruption in the 19th century).

In 1400 the von Leimberg family acquired the rights to rule the city. Only fifty years later the rights went to the knightly family von Westernach. The von Westernachs then traded Niederstotzingen in 1457 to the vom Stain family in exchange for Konzenberg.

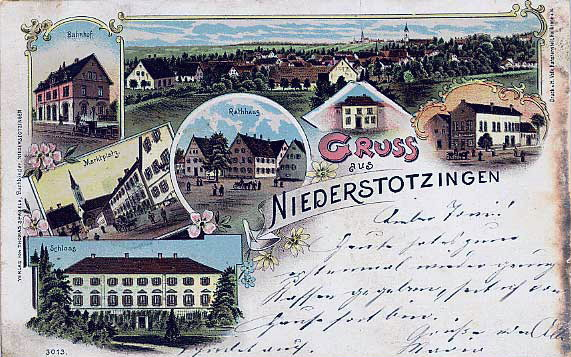
Postcard from 1900 of Niederstotzingen

The Stain family expanded and developed their fief over the following centuries. They granted several important privileges including a guarantee that the citizens of the city couldn't be judged in foreign courts. They also sought to use the wealth of the city to become free Imperial Knights, to only owe loyalty and taxes to the Emperor. However, in 1550 the inheritance of Bernhard vom Stain was split into two pieces: the burgschlossische (called after the old knightly castle, the Burgschloss) and the steinhausische half (called after the Steinhaus or new castle). In 1565 Heinrich vom Stain became Protestant and ordered his half of the town to convert. His brother in the steinhausischen half remained Catholic. The citizens of the city were therefore split over religion for centuries. The Niederstotzinger Church was used by both faiths until 1960.

After the death of the childless Heinrich vom Stain in 1605 his part of Niederstotzingen was granted to his cousin Leopold Karl, who ruled in the neighboring city of Bächingen. Leopold then split his half of Niederstotzingen in 1624, between his two sons. Inside the small city wall of Niederstotzingen there were now three related lords ruling a section of town. There was the Catholic steinhausische, the burgschlossische and the new freihausische rulers.

In 1661 the steinhausische section was sold to the Kaisheim Abbey. In 1799 the last holder of the freihausische section died childless and the section was reunited with the burgschlossische under the Graf (or Count) Karl Leopold vom Stain. He also died in 1809 without any children and his territory (Niederstotzingen as well as Riedhausen) as well as his newly built castle went to his nephew Graf (or Count) Joseph Alexander von Maldeghem. The Schloss Niederstotzingen is currently owned by this family, which had also purchased the villages of Oberstotzingen and Stetten to expand their holdings.

== Tourism and sights ==
- Schloss Niederstotzingen, Neoclassic structure from 1780, built on the location of the old castle (Burgschloss) by the Graf (or Count) vom Stain. Although the castle in the property of von Maldeghem family, and was declared an indivisible and permanent possession of the family in 1843, the schloss may be sold.
- Schloss Oberstotzingen, built in the 16th century by the von Jahrsdorf family, today it is a castle hotel.
- Baroque Church St. Martin in Oberstotzingen, built in 1761 on Roman wall foundations.
- Andreas Church in Niederstotzingen
- Schloss Stetten, built in 1583 for the von Riedheim family. In 1712 rebuilt in the baroque style by Valerian Brenner.
- Baroque pilgrimage church in Stetten, built in 1733, with a copy of the Black Madonna which is found in Einsiedeln, Switzerland
- Ruins of Burg Kaltenburg in Lonetal
- Vogelherdhöhle in Lonetal, site of the Lonetal (Lone valley) horse, believed to be one of the oldest examples of human artwork in the world. The cave has been used by humans for over 35,000 years.

== Personalities ==
- Johann Christoph Friedrich Haug (1761–1829), Professor at the Stuttgart Carl's Academy (a strict military academy founded by Karl Eugen, Duke of Württemberg) and royal poet in Stuttgart
- Rudolf Friedrich Heinrich von Magenau (1767–1848), Church leader and writer.

== See also ==
- List of castles in Baden-Württemberg
