= İbrahim Kendirci =

Turkish actor (born 1986)

- Born: 9 September 1986 (age 40); Gaziantep, Turkey
- Education: Istanbul University State Conservatory
- Occupation: Actor
- Years active: 2007–present

İbrahim Kendirci (born 9 September 1986) is a Turkish actor.

== Life ==
İbrahim Kendirci was born on 9 September 1986 in Gaziantep to Hasibe and Salih Kendirci. He has an older sister named Zeynep. His father Salih, who was a contractor, moved to Antalya with his children when İbrahim was only six months old, with the idea of building studio apartments and selling them to tourists. Kendirci attended high school in Antalya and completed his education at Istanbul University State Conservatory. He gained his first major acting experience playing Deniz Akça in the youth series Kavak Yelleri, which aired on Kanal D from 2007 to 2011 and in which he shared the lead roles with Sarp Apak, Dağhan Külegeç, Pelin Karahan and Aslı Enver. While recounting how he was admitted to the conservatory, Kendirci stated that it was a great surprise that he was selected despite having no hope of being accepted at the auditions. He has admitted that his good looks also played a role in opening doors for him on his way to where he is today. He appeared in the series İki Yaka Bir İsmail, but the series was cancelled because it failed to achieve sufficient ratings. He subsequently shared the lead roles with Dolunay Soysert, Engin Altan Düzyatan and Göksel in the TRT 1 series Yol Ayrımı. He played the character Orhan in the series Sevdaluk, starring Demet Akbağ and Erdal Özyağcılar. Most recently, he appeared in the TRT 1 series Payitaht Abdülhamid. He portrayed the character Merter Tekinsoy in the Show TV series Darısı Başımıza. He subsequently portrayed the character Kerem Gezgin in the series Nöbet. Most recently, he played the character Görkem in the Netflix film Sen Yaşamaya Bak.

== Filmography ==
| Year | Title | Role | Type | Network | Notes |
|---|---|---|---|---|---|
| 2007 | Pars: Kiraz Operasyonu | Volkan | Film | - | |
| 2007–2011 | Kavak Yelleri | Deniz Akça | TV series | Kanal D | Leading role |
| 2012 | İki Yaka Bir İsmail | Üstün | TV series | atv | |
| 2012 | Rakı Masası | | Kısa film | | Leading role |
| 2012–2013 | Yol Ayrımı | Selim | TV series | TRT 1 | |
| 2013 | Arkadaşlar Arasında | Cenk | Film | - | Leading role |
| 2013–2014 | Sevdaluk | Orhan | TV series | Show TV | |
| 2014 | Hayat Ağacı | | TV series | TRT 1 | |
| 2015 | Bizim Hikaye | | Film | - | |
| 2015 | Kaçak Gelinler | Dövmeci | TV series | TV8 | |
| 2016 | Can Bedenden Çıkmayınca | | Streaming series | NTC Medya | |
| 2016 | Kaçın Kurası (Rengarenk) | Yiğit | TV series | atv | |
| 2017 | Kervan 1915 | Ahmet | Film | - | |
| 2017–2018 | Payitaht Abdülhamid | Yusuf | TV series | TRT 1 | |
| 2018 | Darısı Başımıza | Merter Tekinsoy | TV series | Show TV | Leading role |
| 2019 | Nöbet | Kerem Gezgin | TV series | Show TV | Leading role |
| 2022 | Sen Yaşamaya Bak | Görkem | Film | Netflix film | Guest appearance |
| 2022 | Sonsuza Dek Nedime | Emir | Film | Netflix film | |

== Theatre ==
| Year | Title | Role | Venue | Notes |
|---|---|---|---|---|
| 2015 | Ayrılık | | Sadri Alışık Theatre | Leading role |
| 2016 | Ölüm Yakalar | Philippe 1 | Sadri Alışık Theatre | Director; Leading role |
| 2019 | A-Normal | | İkinci Kat | Leading role |

== Commercials ==
| Year | Brand | Product | Reference |
|---|---|---|---|
| 2009 | Ülker | Çokomilk Advertisement | |
| 2010 | Doğuş Yiyecek İçecek A.Ş | Patos Nutty Advertisement | |

== Music videos ==
| Year | Artist | Song | Album | Director |
|---|---|---|---|---|
| 2010 | Hande Yener | "Uzaylı" | Hande'yle Yaz Bitmez | Kemal Doğulu |
| 2010 | Hande Yener | "Uzaylı (Dance Remix)" | Hande'yle Yaz Bitmez | Kemal Doğulu |
| 2021 | Melek Mosso | "Gel desemde gelme" | Sonrası Kalır | Melek Mosso |
