= İclal Aydın =

Turkish actress

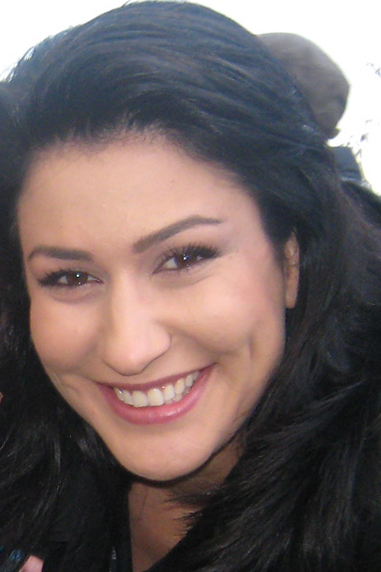
- Born: 14 September 1971 (age 54); Nevşehir, Turkey
- Occupations: Actress, writer, journalist, TV presenter
- Spouses: Kemal Başbuğ (m. 1990; div. 2000) (m. 2002; div. 2005) Tuna Kiremitçi (m. 2006; div. 2007) Efe Kubilay (m. 2015; div. 2019)
- Children: 1

İclal Aydın (born 14 September 1971) is a Turkish actress, writer, journalist, and TV presenter. She is best known for popular comedy family series "İki Aile".

== Life and career ==
Born to a Circassian mother and a Kurdish father, Aydın's family were residents of Nevşehir at the time of her birth. The family moved to Ankara one year later due to her father's new position. She was then educated at Elazığ Anatolian High School. With her parents divorce, she returned to Ankara and spent her high school years writing and staging theatre plays. In 1989, she enrolled in theatre department of Ankara University's School of Language and History – Geography Faculty, but left the school in her second year and moved to Berlin, where she worked as a stage actress for six years.

After returning to Turkey in 1996, she landed a job at a television channel in 1997. In the same year, she appeared in Ayna's music video "Ölünce Sevemezsem Seni". She further rose to prominence with her role in the detective series Sıcak Saatler alongside Mehmet Aslantuğ, Arzum Onan. She then started presenting the women's program 2'den 4'e on HBB. After working for Kanal D, she held positions ar Radyo D, Radyo Cumhuriyet, Radyo Kent, and BRT FM between 1998 and 2000. In 1999, she presented Hayat Güzeldir on BRT. The diaries and information gathered for Hayat Güzeldir formed the basis of her first book. Between 2006 and 2008, Aydın starred in Star TV's İki Aile as Eda. In 2012, she appeared as Behice on the period series Veda based on novel alongside Mehmet Aslantuğ, Fahriye Evcen. She subsequently had a supporting role on O Hayat Benim. In July 2016, Aydın began presenting her own program İclal Aydın'la Yeniden on Show TV. In 2018, she starred in TRT1's Ege'nin Hamsisi. As of 2022, she has a leading role on the Kanal D series Üç Kız Kardeş.

== Personal life ==
Aydın has been married four times and has a daughter, named Zeynep Lal, with Kemal Başbuğ. Between 2006 and 2007 she was married to Tuna Kiremitçi.

== Filmography ==
=== Film and TV series ===
- 1995: Bir Demet Tiyatro
- 1995: Mirasyediler
- 1998: Sıcak Saatler
- 2000: Yarın Geç Olmayacak
- 2000: Vizontele
- 2000: Zor Hedef
- 2001: Dedem, Gofret ve Ben
- 2003: Vizontele Tuuba
- 2004: Avrupa Yakası
- 2005: Organize İşler
- 2006–2008: İki Aile
- 2009: Güldünya
- 2009: Haneler
- 2012: Göç Zamanı
- 2012: Gına
- 2012: Aşkın Halleri
- 2012: Veda
- 2014: O Hayat Benim
- 2018: Ege'nin Hamsisi
- 2022–: Üç Kız Kardeş

== TV and radio programs ==
- 2'den 4'e (presenter)
- 1998–2000: Radyo D, Radyo Cumhuriyet, Radyo Kent BRT FMD
- 1999: Hayat Güzeldir
- 2014: Arkadaşım Hoşgeldin (guest)
- 2016: İclal Aydın'la Yeniden

== Bibliography ==
- 2001: Hayat Güzeldir
- 2003: Bitmiş Aşklar Emanetçisi
- 2004: Yaz Bitmesin
- 2005: Gördüğüme Sevindim
- 2009: Evlerin Işıkları Bir Bir Yanarken
- 2009: Senin Adın Bile Geçmedi
- 2010: Kağıt Kesikleri
- 2011: Zeynep Lal Büyürken – "Resimler Rengarenkler"
- 2011: Zeynep Lal Büyürken – "Kanatlar"
- 2013: Aşk Ve Acı
- 2013: Bir Cihan Kafes
- 2018: Üç Kız Kardeş
- 2019: Kalbimin Can Mayası
- 2021: Söylenmemiş Sözler
- 2021: Unutursun
