= Eser Yenenler =

Turkish actor (born 1984)

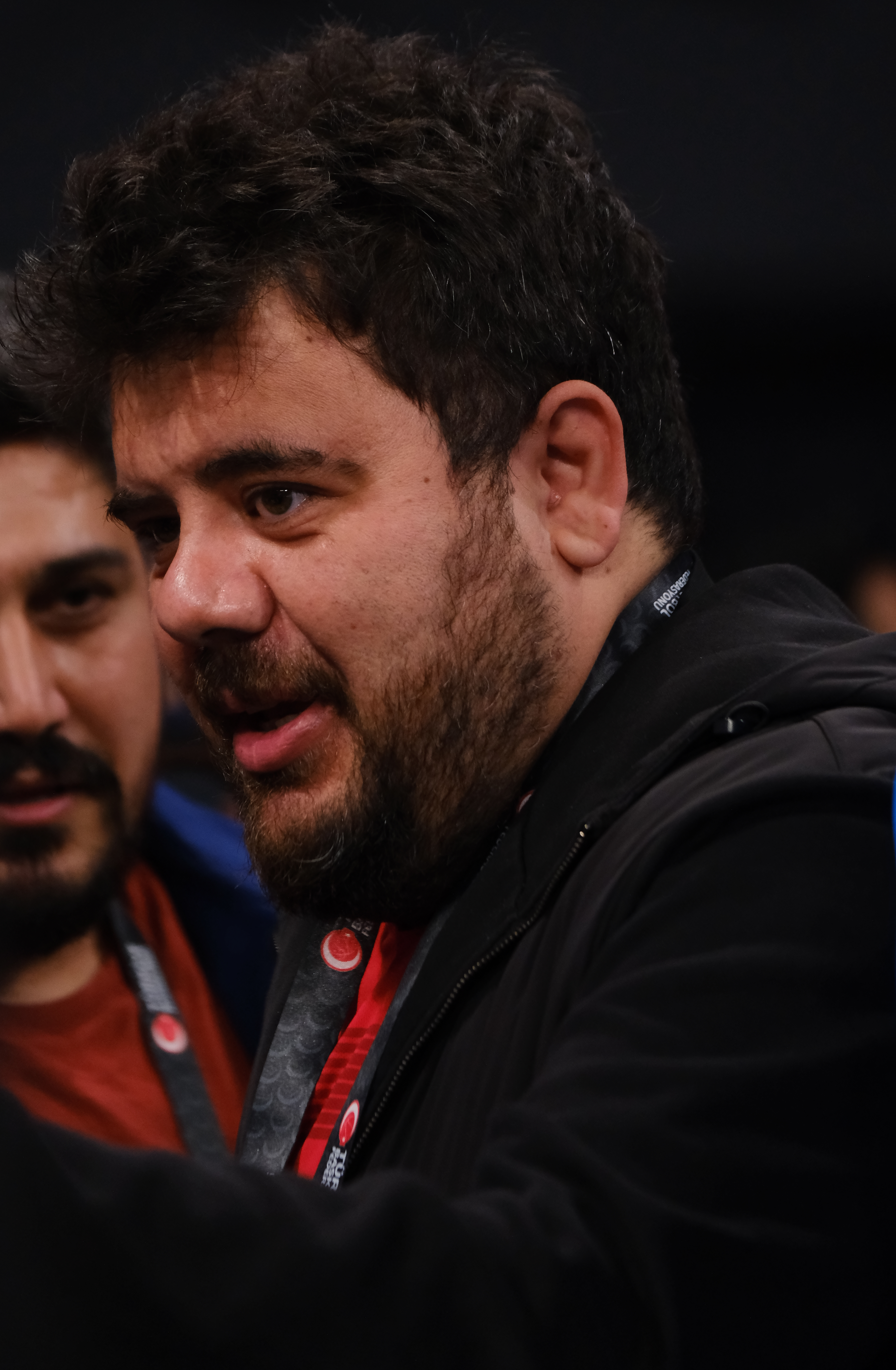
- Born: 14 February 1984 (age 42); Bursa, Turkey
- Occupations: TV presenter, actor, comedian
- Years active: 2004–present
- Height: 1.82 m (6 ft 0 in)
- Spouse: Berfu Yıldız (m. 2019)
- Children: 2

Eser Yenenler (born 14 February 1984) is a Turkish comedian, TV presenter and actor.

== Personal life ==
A part of his family is originally from North Africa. He graduated from Marmara University with a degree in Business Administration and master of marketing and advertising . His father died when he was 6 years old. He has two older sisters. His ex girlfriend is Farah Zeynep Abdullah. In 2019, he married Berfu Yıldız, with whom he has two sons.

== Career ==
Yenenler started acting on stage at the age of 11. He started his career on stage by joining Bursa Municipal Youth Theatre, Bursa State Theatre, and Istanbul Academy of Life respectively.

He made his television debut in 2003 with the hit series Aliye, in which he played the role of Özgür. Since 2006, he became part of BKM Mutfak directed by Yılmaz Erdoğan. While in the organization, he works as a presenter, screenwriter and actor on the comedy program Çok Güzel Hareketler Bunlar.

For a while he presented Star TV's Eyvah Düşüyorum contest. With İbrahim Büyükak and Oğuzhan Koç, he performed stand up in Europe and Turkey. Additionally, they started the 3+1 talk show on Star TV. Under Acun Media's production, they later continued the program under the name 3 Adam. Yenenler also served as a judge on Yetenek Sizsiniz Türkiye (Turkish version of Got Talent) alongside Ali Taran and Seda Bakan from 2013 to 2017.

He performed his solo musical stand up, titled "TBT" in BKM. In 2017, he appeared on the tribute album Mirkelam Şarkıları, in which he performed the song "Ah Bir Joker". In 2018, he started his own talk show on TV8 called "Eser Yenenler Show" and panel "EYS Gece Modu". He founded writer company "Cetto".

In 2022, he performs stand up "Çift Terapisi" with Berfu Yıldız. He played in film "Prestij Meselesi" about Prestij music company.

== Filmography ==
Film
Year	Title	Role	Notes
2010	Çok Filim Hareketler Bunlar	Himself	Leading role
2009	Neşeli Hayat	Turgut	Supporting role
2014	Paddington	Paddington (voice)	Turkish version
2017	Fırıldak Ailesi	Necati (voice)	Animated film
2017	Doru	Horse (voice)	Animated film
2017	Yol Arkadaşım	Speaker	Guest appearance
2023	Prestij Meselesi	Şinasi	Leading role
Television
Year	Title	Role	Notes
2004	Aliye	Özgür	Supporting role
2006	Fırtına	Erhan	Guest appearance
2006–2007	Bir Demet Tiyatro	Himself	
2006–2012 / 2020–	Çok Güzel Hareketler Bunlar	Himself	Presenter, screenwriter and actor
2012–2013	Eyvah Düşüyorum	Himself	Presenter
2013	Benzemez Kimse Sana	Himself	Guest appearance
2013–2016	3 Adam	Himself	Presenter
2013	Yetenek Sizsiniz Türkiye	Himself	Judge
2014	Kim Milyoner Olmak İster	Himself	Presenter (1 episode)
2015	Bana Baba Dedi	Bora	Leading role
2018	Şöhret Kafası	Himself	Presenter
2018–2020	Eser Yenenler Show	Himself	Presenter
