= Kardeş Türküler =

Turkish musical group

Kardeş Türküler (translated either as Brotherly Songs or as Ballads of Fraternity) is a contemporary Turkish ethnic/folkloric band. It was formed in 1993 with a series of stage performances given by the music branch of the Folklore Club at Boğaziçi University in Istanbul, Turkey.

== Origins ==
The diverse ethnic groups in this ancient Anatolia region and the Balkans initially gave cause for the concerts to have artists perform interpretations of Anatolian folksongs in Turkish, Arabic, Kurdish, Assyrian, Azerbaijani, Georgian and Armenian. Under the auspices of the Boğaziçi Performing Arts Ensemble (BGST), formed in 1995, the program used the concert stage to advance the ideals of common ancestry and celebration of diversity as a foil to cultural polarization and ethnic tension. Eventually, the musical heritage of the Laz, Georgian, Circassian, Romani, Macedonian and Alevi cultures were all incorporated into the program. The scholarly collection and research of the diverse folklore traditions of the region is an important part of BGST’s activities, but Kardeş Türküler has been intent on forging its own music tradition as well.

== Members ==
The following members have made major contributions to Kardeş Türküler:

- Ayhan Akkaya
- Aytekin Gazi Ataş
- Burak Korucu
- Burcu Yankın
- Burcu Yıldız
- Diler Özer
- Evren Bay
- Emin Çiftçi
- Erol Mutlu
- Fehmiye Çelik
- Feryal Öney
- İlkem Balseçen
- Neriman Güneş
- Nevzat Çelebi
- Ozan E. Aksoy
- Özgür Akgül
- Saro Usta
- Soner Akalin
- Selda Öztürk
- Şenay Karaman
- Şirin Özgün
- Tolgahan Çoğulu
- Ülker Uncu
- Vedat Yıldırım
- Yücel Balım

== Discography ==
Title and details	Notes
Hardasan (Songs of Azerbaijan): Released: October 1996	Feryal Öney sings with the accompaniment of Azerbaijani musicians
Kardeş Türküler: Released: June 1997	Debut album of the group with a repertoire of songs representing various musical traditions rooted in Anatolia and Mesopotamia
Doğu (The East): Released: July 1999	Second album focusing on traditions from the eastern part of the region
Roj û Heyv: Released: January 2000	An album marking Şivan Perwer's 25th year as an artist, and contains his traditional songs. Based on some basic musical forms of the Kurdish region, it contains the melodic, vocal and rhythmic characteristics of the "stran" of various areas. An attempt was made to embellish upon the characteristic aspects of Kurdish music, based sometimes on local vocal styles and the modal structure of the music, at times on the ways of expression and imagery in the spoken language, which differs from region to region, and at other times on the songs' literary background.
Hemâvâz: Released: December 2002	Album emphasizing cultural commonalities amidst diversity
Bahar: Released: May 2005	Album emphasizing cultural commonalities amidst diversity
Çocuk 'H'Aklı: Released: April 2011	Children's songs with Arto Tunçboyacıyan

Soundtracks

- January 2001: Vizontele - Soundtrack of a popular film directed by Yılmaz Erdoğan and Ömer Faruk Sorak
- January 2004: Vizontele Tuuba - Soundtrack for the sequel film directed by Yılmaz Erdoğan about the music and cultures of Anatolia and Mesopotamia. Yılmaz Erdoğan

Others

- June 2013: "Tencere Tava Havası" (meaning "Sound of Pots and Pans"), a street performance as a criticism of Turkish Prime Minister Erdoğan's response to ongoing passive protests involving people banging silverware to pans and pots released on their official YouTube channel.

Collaborations with other artists

- Kardeş Türküler has worked with a number of leading international artists, notably the Armenian musicians Arto Tunçboyacıyan and Ara Dinkjian and the Palestinian Reem Kelani. Both Arto Tunçboyacıyan and Reem Kelani appeared together with Kardeş Türküler in their June 2009 concert at the Turkcell Kuruçesme Arena, Istanbul.
- In 2013, Kardeş Türküler and Tunçboyacıyan released a joint album.
- In April 2014, Kardeş Türküler and Reem Kelani gave a joint concert at TIM Maslak in Istanbul which attracted considerable interest in the Turkish media.
- Kardeş Türküler will also be touring in 2014 with the leading Turkish pop singer, Sezen Aksu.

Awards and achievements
Preceded by Cahit Berkay	Golden Orange Award for Best Music Score; 2001 for Vizontele	Succeeded by Mazlum Çimen
