= Şahin Irmak =

Turkish actor

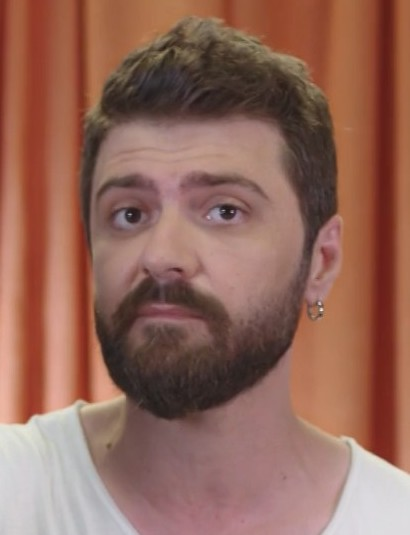
- Şahin Irmak in 2017
- Born: 29 September 1981 (age 44); İzmir, Turkey
- Occupation: Actor
- Years active: 1997–present
- Spouse: Asena Tuğal

Şahin Irmak (born 29 September 1981) is a Turkish actor.

== Life and career ==
Irmak's breakthrough came with his role in the TV series Karayılan as "Şiro". He then appeared in several different roles on Kanal D's Çok Güzel Hareketler Bunlar comedy program. In 2011, he joined the cast of Aşağı Yukarı Yemişlililer, portraying the character of "Sülo" (Süleyman). His first cinematic main role was in the movie Entelköy Efeköy'e Karşı in 2011. In 2012, he had a leading role in the TV series Sultan.

In October 2015, Irmak was sentenced to 10 months in prison by the 19th Court of Istanbul for "using drugs" and was acquitted for "establishment, management and membership" of a drug ring. The court postponed the sentence because the prison sentence was less than a year.

He then joined Star TV's program Eğlendirme Dairesi for 5 episodes. In January 2016, he became part of the comedy show Geldim Gördüm Güldüm on Show TV. Between 2018 and 2020, he had a role in the sitcom Jet Sosyete.

== Personal life ==
Irmak married actress Asena Tuğal in 2018 after two years of dating.

== Filmography ==
Film
Year	Title	Role	Notes
2004	Gönül Yarası	Barman	
2006	Beynelmilel	Şahin	
2007	Kutsal Damacana	Doctor	
2009	Neşeli Hayat	Serkan	
2010	Çok Filim Hareketler Bunlar		
2011	Kutsal Damacana: Dracoola	Dracula	
2011	Entelköy Efeköy'e Karşı	Muhtar Ali	
2015	Git Başımdan	Latif Selamsız	
2016	Yok Artık 2	Berber Adnan	
2017	Dede Korkut Hikayeleri: Deli Dumrul	Deli Dumrul	
2018	Düğüm Salonu	Serkan	Screenwriter

Television
Year	Title	Role	Notes
2004	Kurtlar Vadisi		Episode 48
2004	Yolpalas Cinayeti		Television film
2005	Memleket Hikayeleri: Aşan Bilir Karlı Dağın Ardını	Osman	Television film
2006	Aliye	İlknur	
2011	Aşağı Yukarı Yemişlililer	Sülo	
2008–2010, 2011	Çok Güzel Hareketler Bunlar		
2011, 2018	Beyaz Show	Himself	Guest
2014	Kim O		
2014	Makina Kafa	Himself	Guest
2015	Evlendirme Dairesi		5 episodes (1–5)
2016	3G Show		
2018–2020	Jet Sosyete	Talip Yılmaz	
2018	Benimle Oynama	Himself	8 episodes (1–8)
2019	Eser Yenenler Show	Himself	Guest
2019	Çok Güzel Hareketler 2		Guest starring
2021	Yalancı	Okay Aytekin	
2021	Fandom	Can Aslan	
2024 - present	Kudüs Fatihi Selahaddin Eyyubi	Komutan Yaruki	Guest
