= Büşra Pekin =

Turkish actress

- Born: Elif Büşra Pekin; 30 June 1982 (age 43); Saudi Arabia
- Occupation: Actress
- Years active: 2004–present

Elif Büşra Pekin (born 30 June 1982 in Saudi Arabia) is a Turkish actress and screenwriter. Her family is of Turkish descent. After the Ottoman Empire collapsed, her paternal family immigrated from Thessaloniki. She grew up in İzmir and United States.

She graduated from theatre department of Dokuz Eylül University. She is best known for theatrical sketch comedy Çok Güzel Hareketler Bunlar and film based from the life of Dilberay. She played many popular films and series since 2004.

== Filmography ==
=== Movies ===
Movies
Year	Title	Role	Notes
2007	Kutsal Damacana	Selen	Leading role
2009	Neşeli Hayat	Ayla Şenyurt	Leading role
2010	Çok Filim Hareketler Bunlar	Hatice	Leading role / screenwriter
2010	Gişe Memuru	Nevra	Supporting role
2013	Mutlu Aile Defteri	İsmet Taşyumruk	Leading role
2014	İtirazım Var	Nebahat Kuzu	Leading role
2014	Hadi İnşallah	Pucca	Leading role
2014	Mucize	Gülten (Güle)	Leading role
2015	Nadide Hayat	Talking Turtle	Voice over
2016	Benim Adım Feridun		Leading role
2017	Kolonya Cumhuriyeti	Mualla	Leading role
2017	Tatlım Tatlım	Tatlım	Leading role
2019	Fırıncının Karısı	Ferdane	Leading role
2020	Bayi Toplantısı	Övgü	Leading role
2022	Dilberay	Dilber Ay	Leading role

=== TV series ===
TV series
Year	Title	Role	Notes
2002	En Son Babalar Duyar	Esma	Guest appearance
2003	Hayat Bilgisi	Student	Extra
2006	Bir Demet Tiyatro	Songül	Guest appearance
2006	Fırtına	Melahat	Supporting role
2008	Sınıf	Melek	Supporting role
2008–2010	Çok Güzel Hareketler Bunlar	Büşra	Leading role / screenwriter
2010	Geniş Aile	Behice	Guest appearance
2011	Muhteşem Yüzyıl	Şirin Hatun	Guest appearance
2011	Aşağı Yukarı Yemişlililer	Menekşe	Leading role / screenwriter
2012	Annem Uyurken	Defne	Leading role
2012	İşler Güçler	Ecevit Tersyatan (Ece)	Supporting role
2014–2015	Kardeş Payı	House owner	Guest appearance (episode 23)

=== TV programs ===
TV programs
Year	Title	Role	Notes
2014	Kim O!	various roles	
2015	Komedi Türkiye	Herself	Guest appearance (episode 5)
2016	Buyur Bi'de Burdan Bak	Herself	Team captain
2023	Yıldız De Bana	Herself	Judge
