= Özgül =

- Gender: Female

Origin
- Language: Turkish
- Meaning: specific

Other names
- Related names: Özgür, Özge, Özgü

Özgül is a common feminine Turkish given name. In Turkish, "Özgül" means "specific".

== People ==
- Özgül Koşar, actress.
- Özgül Küçük, cryptography researcher at Katholieke Universiteit Leuven

== Fictional characters ==
- Ayla Özgül, in German television soap opera Gute Zeiten, schlechte Zeiten
