= Özge =

- Gender: female
- Language: Turkish

Origin
- Meaning: different, distinct, ablude, altruistic, unique

Other names
- Related names: Özgü, Özgül

Özge is a common female Turkish given name. In Turkish, "Özge" means "Different", "Distinct", "Unique", "Ablude", and/or "Daredevil".

== People ==
- Özge Akın (born 1985), Turkish sprinter
- Özge Bayrak (born 1992), Turkish badminton player
- Özge Borak (born 1982), Turkish actress
- Özge Gürel (born 1987), Turkish television and film actress
- Özge Kanbay (1996–2019), Turkish women's footballer and referee
- Özge Kavurmacıoğlu (born 1993), Turkish female basketball player
- Özge Kırdar (born 1985), Turkish female volleyball player
- Özge Özacar (born 1995), Turkish actress
- Özge Özberk (born 1976), Turkish actress
- Özge Özder (born 1978), Turkish actress
- Özge Özel (born 1991), Turkish women's footballer
- Çağıl Özge Özkul (born 1988), Turkish beauty pageant titleholder
- Özge Özpirinçci (born 1986), Turkish actress
- Özge Samancı (born 1975), Turkish American artist
- Özge Törer (born 1999), Turkish actress
- Özge Ulusoy (born 1982), Turkish top model, professional ballerina and occasional film actress
- Özge Ece Üner (born 1981), Turkish news anchor
- Özge Yağız (born 1997), Turkish actress
- Özgenur Yurtdagülen (born 1993), Turkish volleyball player
- Özge Hellström (born 1995), Turkish creative marketer

== Surname ==
- Aslı Özge (born 1975), Turkish filmmaker
