= Elman Music =

Azerbaijani–Turkish singer (born 1964)

- Born: 18 January 1964 (age 62); Baku, Azerbaijan SSR, Soviet Union
- Origin: Baku, Azerbaijan
- Genres: World music; Azerbaijani music; Turkish music; Russian music; Pop
- Occupations: Singer; Multi-instrumentalist
- Instruments: Balaban; Tütək; Ney; Oud; Garmon; Accordion; Piano; Zurna; Naqara; Kaval; Daf; Synthesizer; Guitar; Duduk
- Years active: 1970s–present

Elman Music, previously known in Turkey as Erman Albayrak (born 18 January 1964, in Baku, Azerbaijan SSR, Soviet Union) is an Azerbaijani–Turkish singer and multi-instrumentalist based in Toronto, Canada. He performs in over eight languages and plays 16 musical instruments professionally. He is known in Turkey as the "One-Man Orchestra" for his performances using unconventional instruments including porcelain plates and glass bottles. He is perhaps best known internationally for reaching the semi-finals of Yetenek Sizsiniz Türkiye (Turkey's Got Talent) in 2009.

== Early life and education ==
Elman was born on 18 January 1964, in Baku, in what was then the Azerbaijan Soviet Socialist Republic. From a young age, he showed a strong interest in music, beginning his early career performing alongside his brother in local ensembles. He studied directing and acting at the Azerbaijan State University of Culture and Arts, graduating in 1992.

== Career ==
=== Early international career ===
Following his military service, Elman pursued music professionally across many former Soviet republics. During his years based in Bodrum, Turkey, he studied Turkish classical music under Zeki Müren, one of Turkey's most celebrated classical vocalists. He also performed with the band of İbrahim Tatlıses in Istanbul. In 1993–1994, he participated in world tours with Karvan group, the internationally known Turkish performance troupe.

=== Debut album ===
In 2005, Elman released his debut album Balam, comprising 14 songs and three music videos. The album received significant airplay on Azerbaijani television channels, with songs including "Azərbaycanım Mənim", "Balam", "Badamı Gözlər", and "Pəşman Olmuşam" gaining wide popularity.

=== Yetenek Sizsiniz Türkiye (2009 and 2014) ===
In 2009, competing under the name Erman Albayrak, Elman appeared on Yetenek Sizsiniz Türkiye — the Turkish edition of Got Talent, produced by Acun Ilıcalı — reaching the semi-finals. His performance, titled "Tabaklarla Müzik" (Music with Plates), involved playing porcelain plates collected over approximately 40 years, alongside the balaban and tütək. In 2014, he returned to the programme with a performance using glass bottles, receiving four affirmative votes from the judges and advancing to the second round.

=== Kanal D ile Günaydın Türkiye (2017) ===
He also appeared on the Turkish television programme Kanal D ile Günaydın Türkiye on 13 October 2017, performing his "Tabaklarla Müzik" act under the name Erman Albayrak, playing Justin Bieber's "Sorry" on porcelain plates.

=== Shanson Club Award and later career ===
In 2015, Elman received the "Шансон Года" (Chanson of the Year) award at the Shanson Club 2015 ceremony in Tbilisi, Georgia, alongside Azerbaijani singer Aydınçik. Throughout his career he has performed alongside artists including Alim Qasımov, Akif İslamzadə, Hüseynəğa Hadiyev, Elçin Cəlilov, Eyyub Yaqubov, Nizami Remzi, Tahir Ümüd, and Azər Zeynalov. In recent years, based in Toronto, Canada, he has held concerts in New York, Chicago, and Toronto, releasing music on streaming platforms under the name Elman Music.

== Artistry ==
Elman plays 16 musical instruments professionally, including the balaban, tütək, ney, accordion, piano, oud, garmon, zurna, naqara, synthesizer, guitar, melodica. He performs in Azerbaijani, Turkish, Russian, Italian, Georgian, French, Persian, and many other languages, adapting his repertoire to each audience.

== Discography ==
=== Albums ===
Year	Album	Label	Notes
2005	Balam	NIL Production	14 tracks; directed 3 music videos ("Badamı Gözlər", "Azərbaycanım Mənim", "Balam")

==== Balam (2005) — Track listing ====
No.	Title	Writer(s)	Length
1	"Azərbaycanım Mənim"	Tahir Ümüd	4:26
2	"Birdəfəlik Get"	Elman Əliyev	5:04
3	"Mən Dəli Oldum"	Elman Əliyev	3:35
4	"Hardasan"	Elman Əliyev	4:51
5	"Balam"	Tahir Ümüd, Elman Əliyev	3:57
6	"Qara Tellər"	Traditional (folk)	4:02
7	"Наслаждайтесь"	Elman Əliyev	4:57
8	"Qaqaş"	Elman Əliyev, Tahir Ümüd, Fuad	3:56
9	"Badamı Gözlər"	Elman Əliyev	5:06
10	"Peşman Olmuşam"	Tahir Ümüd	4:08
11	"Səni Gözləyəcəyəm"	Elman Əliyev	5:01
12	"Она Такая"	Elman Əliyev	3:54
13	"Gəştə-Gəştə"	Traditional (folk)	3:55
14	"Ləyməni"	Traditional (folk)	4:51

=== Singles (selected, 2025–2026) ===
No.	Title	Year
1	"Tut Ağacı Boyunca"	2025
2	"В Этом Городе"	2025
3	"Azərbaycanım Mənim"	2025
4	"İntizar"	2025
5	"Bu Qala Daşlı Qala"	2025
6	"Kim Bilir" (Remix)	2025
7	"Ben Yoruldum Hayat"	2025
8	"Şuşam Lay Lay"	2025
9	"Cukle Eyille (Ləyməni)"	2026
