= Sarp Apak =

Kurdish actor

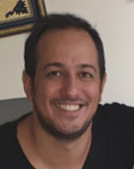
- Born: Kerim Sarp Apak; 11 November 1981 (age 44); Diyarbakır, Turkey
- Occupation: Actor
- Years active: 2004–present

Sarp Apak (born 11 November 1981) is a Turkish actor.

== Early life ==
Apak was born and raised in Diyarbakır until the age of five, before moving with his family to Bursa. His parents were from Adana and Antakya. He later studied at the Bursa Boys High School.

== Career ==
Apak planned to study business administration but instead took part in theatre classes. After finishing his studies at Dokuz Eylül University School of Fine Arts in 2004, he moved to Istanbul with the help of his instructor.

He was first noted with his role in Ağır Roman, which went on stage at Sadri Alışık Theatre. He then joined Yılmaz Erdoğan's BKM Group and was cast in a small role in Organize İşler. He then had roles in the series Anadolu Kaplanı and En Son Babalar Duyar. Apak also played in the children's play Sizinkiler Dünya Kaç Bucak and went on tour across Turkey.

After doing a stand-up comedy under the title Mutfak, he had his breakthrough with his role as Tanrıverdi in the hit sitcomAvrupa Yakası. He joined hit series "Kavak Yelleri" (remake of Dawson's Creek). He played in hit sitcom "Yalan Dünya".

In October 2015, Apak was sentenced to 10 months in prison for "using drugs" according to the decision of the Istanbul 19th Central Criminal Court, and was acquitted of the charge of "establishing, managing and being a member of a drug ring". The court postponed the sentence as the prison sentence was less than a year.

== Theatre ==
- Öp Babanın Elini
- Sizinkiler Dünya Kaç Bucak
- Ağır Roman (play)|Ağır Roman
- BKM Mutfak
- Çok Güzel Hareketler Bunlar
- Yoldan Çıkan Oyun

== Filmography ==
=== Film ===
- Organize İşler (2005) – Kemal
- Beyaz Melek (2007) – Reşat
- Plajda (2008) – Ali
- O... Çocukları (2008) – Saffet
- Güneşi Gördüm (2009) – Ahmet
- Yedi Kocalı Hürmüz (2009) – Fişek Ömer
- Yeraltı (2012) – Barmen
- Karışık Kaset(2014) – Ulaş
- Yaktın Beni (2015) – Selam
- Ölümlü Dünya (2018)

=== Television ===
- Avrupa Yakası (2006–2009) – Tanrıverdi Ekşioğulları
- Kavak Yelleri (2009–2011) Güven Karakuş
- Yalan Dünya (2011–2014) – Emir Danışman
- Jet Sosyete (2018–2020) – Ozan Özpamuk
- Kaderimin Oyunu (2021–) – Mahir

=== As guest actor ===
- En Son Babalar Duyar (2002) – İsmail
- Anadolu Kaplanı (2006)
- Aşk Tutulması (2008)
- Aşk Geliyorum Demez (2009) – Berkcan
- Çok Güzel Hareketler Bunlar (2008 / 2010)
- Aşağı Yukarı Yemişlililer (2011)
- Komedi Türkiye (2015)
