= Ata Demirer =

Turkish actor and musician (born 1972)

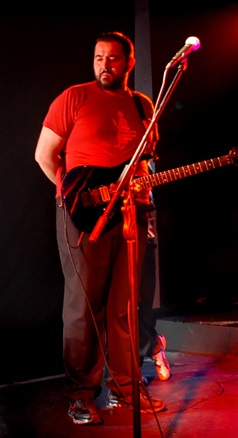
- Born: Ali Ata Demirer; 6 July 1972 (age 53); Bursa, Turkey
- Occupations: Filmmaker and Stand-up comedian
- Years active: 1995–present
- Spouse: Özge Borak (m. 2012; div. 2014)

Ali Ata Demirer (born 6 July 1972) is a Turkish filmmaker, stand-up comedian, actor, and musician.

He is known for his live comedy sketches "Korsan TV" as well as for writing and starring in a string of Turkish box-office hits including Eyyvah Eyvah, Berlin Kaplanı, Neredesin Firuze and hit sitcom series Avrupa Yakası. He is best known for imitation, accent ability. Due to his stand-up style is like storyteller Meddah which lost in new generation.

== Biography ==
=== Early life and education ===
His maternal family is of Meskherian Turk descent. His paternal family is of Albanian descent. Demirer, who demonstrated a talent for singing and music at an early age, studied at Bursa Boys' High School before transferring in his final year and graduating with honours from Çelebi Mehmet High School.

=== Career ===
After leaving school he found work, with the help of his brothers, as a night club pianist. In 1991, he moved to Istanbul after being accepted on Turkish music department of State Conservatory of Istanbul Technical University. During his studies he started performing stand-up in bars and befriended Gökhan Semiz of Turkish comedy troop Vitamin Group and sang on their single Turkish Cowboys. His first professional performances were organised with the assistance of E.Ş.EK Theatre Group founder Uğur Uludağ and while performing in musical theater with the group in Assos he was offered the lead role in the 1995 production of Funny Money (Komik Para) at the Dormen Theatre. That same year he also founded and toured with the Ege Kumpanya orchestral group as well as continuing to perform stand-up.

In 1998 he impressed the organisers at Leman Kültür with recordings of his earlier shows and they staged his show Tek Kişilik Dev Kadro which consisted mostly of impersonations of Turkish celebrities such as actor Kadir İnanır and singers Bülent Ersoy and Emrah. After more than 1000 performances the show transferred successfully to television with Star TV's 42-episode run of Korsan TV (2001) written, produced and presented by Demirer. He subsequently joined the cast of Star TV's Tatlı Hayat (2001–04), the Turkish version of US television sitcom The Jeffersons (1975–1985) and began his film career, alongside future Eyyvah Eyvah co-star Demet Akbağ, in the supporting cast of Where's Firuze? (Neredesin Firuze?) and Vizontele Tuuba (both 2004). His greatest success came with a three-season run from 2004 to 2006 as the loveable Volkan in the popular Atv sitcom Avrupa Yakası, which also led to his first cinematic lead role as Güngör in Neco Çelik's Kısık Ateşte 15 Dakika (2006). During this time he also continued his music career with the release of the studio album Makara (2005) and the four-track maxi-single Exit (2006) as well as the TV show Hacıyatmaz (2007).

In April 2007, he started a stand-up tour called Ata Demirer Show which he took around Turkey and to the Netherlands, Germany and France. Upon returning from his tour he took the lead role of Sultan Osman VII in Gani Müjde's hit comedy The Ottoman Republic (Osmanlı Cumhuriyeti), which was the fourth highest-grossing Turkish film of 2008, and returned as Volkan for the final two seasons of Avrupa Yakası from 2008 to 2009. After the series finished, he wrote and co-starred with Demet Akbağ in Hakan Algül's Eyyvah Eyvah (2010) and Eyyvah Eyvah 2 (2011), which were the highest-grossing Turkish films of their respective years. His latest film Berlin Kaplanı (2012) also debuted at number one in the weekly Turkish box office.

== Filmography ==
Series
| Year | Title | Credited as | | | | | Notes |
| Year | Title | Director | Producer | Writer | Actor | Role | Notes |
|---|---|---|---|---|---|---|---|
| 2001-2004 | Korsan TV | | Yes | Yes | Yes | Numerous roles | Sketches series |
| 2002–2003 | Tatlı Hayat | | | | Yes | Subuti | Joined |
| 2004–2006, 2008-2009 | Avrupa Yakası | | | | Yes | Volkan Sütçüoğlu | |
| 2019 | Jet Sosyete | | | | Yes | Volkan Sütçüoğlu | Guest of New Year special episode. |
Films
| Year | Title | Credited as | | | | | Notes |
| Year | Title | Director | Producer | Writer | Actor | Role | Notes |
| 2004 | Neredesin Firuze? | | | | Yes | | |
| 2004 | Vizontele Tuuba | | | | Yes | | Written and directed by Yılmaz Erdoğan |
| 2006 | Kısık Ateşte 15 Dakika | | | | Yes | Güngör | |
| 2008 | Osmanlı Cumhuriyeti | | | | Yes | Sultan Osman VII | |
| 2010 | Eyyvah Eyvah | | | Yes | Yes | Hüseyin Badem | |
| 2011 | Eyyvah Eyvah 2 | | | Yes | Yes | Hüseyin Badem | |
| 2012 | Berlin Kaplanı | | | Yes | Yes | Ayhan Kaplan | |
| 2014 | Eyyvah Eyvah 3 | | | Yes | Yes | Hüseyin Badem | |
| 2015 | Niyazi Gül Dörtnala | | | Yes | Yes | Niyazi | |
| 2017 | Olanlar Oldu | | | Yes | Yes | Zafer, Döndü | |
| 2018 | Hedefim Sensin | | | Yes | Yes | Zekeriya Usta | |
| 2018 | Organize İşler 2: Sazan Sarmalı | | | Yes | Yes | Ahmet | |
| 2023 | Bursa Bülbülü | | | Yes | Yes | Cengiz Sezen | Disney+ original film |

== Stand-up ==
- 2000: Ata Demirer Show
- 2001: Korsan TV
- 2003: Havadan Sudan
- 2005: Anadolu Futbol Kulübü Tanıtımı
- 2005: Tek Kişilik Dev Kadro
- 2010: Ata Demirer Show
- 2011: Tek Kişilik Dev Kadro 2
- 2015: Ata Demirer Gazinosu

== Talk Show ==
- HacıYatmaz (2007)

== Discography ==
- 2005: "Makara"
- 2006: "Exit (Maxi Single)"
- 2014: "Alaturka"
- 2023: "Unutabilsem" (from the album "40 Yıl")

== Personal life ==
His mother, Ayten Kaçar, is of Turkish Meskhetian origin and his father is of Albanian origin.
