= Özge Ulusoy =

Turkish actress and model

- Born: October 28, 1982 (age 43); Ankara, Turkey
- Occupations: Model, actress television presenter ballerina
- Modeling information
- Height: 1.80 m (5 ft 11 in)
- Hair color: Brunette
- Eye color: Brown
- Agency: Uğurkan Erez Agency; Gaye Sökmen Agency
- Beauty pageant titleholder
- Title: Miss Turkey 2003 (1st runner-up); Elite Model Look 2002 (2nd runner-up)
- Major competitions: Miss Turkey 2003; Miss Universe 2003; Elite Model Look

Özge Ulusoy (born October 28, 1982) is a Turkish actress, model, former ballet dancer and beauty pageant titleholder. She is best known for her appearance in the popular TV-series Arka Sokaklar from 2006 to 2009. As a model, she walked the runways for Hussein Chalayan, Mavi Jeans, Mudo, Hervé Léger, Balenciaga, Eva Gronbach, Guy Laroche, Emanuel Ungaro, Christian Dior, Marks & Spencer, Harvey Nichols, Mango, etc. She held the first runner-up title for the annual beauty pageant Miss Turkey in 2003. In 2002, Ulusoy finished third in Elite Model Management's Elite Model Look competition, took second place the following year in the Miss Turkey competition, and won the Miss Turkey Universe 2003 title before signing with Uğurkan Erez Model Management in Istanbul. Since her debut, Ulusoy has been the face of a variety of advertising campaigns in Turkey.

== Early life and career ==
Özge Ulusoy was born on October 28, 1982, in Ankara, the youngest and second of two children of H. Ulusoy, a retired chief military justice of Turkish Armed Forces, and Armağan (née ?), a former mayor. Ulusoy was raised a Muslim. She has an elder sister, Associate Professor Nilay Ulusoy, an academician in Bahçeşehir University and Marmara University and an alumna of Sorbonne.

== Education ==
A native of İzmir, Turkey, Özge Ulusoy is a graduate of faculty of fine arts in Hacettepe University, Mimar Sinan Fine Arts University and Yeditepe University, where she had classical ballet course and arts administration bachelor's degree. She passed her conservatory examinations to be accepted into these most considerable ballet schools at the age of 12. She has first studied in Hacettepe University, two years later she transferred to Mimar Sinan Fine Arts University in Istanbul.

== Career ==
=== Miss Turkey ===
Later in 2003, after holding the first runner-up for the Miss Turkey 2003 title she entered Yeditepe University where she majored in Arts administration with a specialty in classical ballet. In 2011, she finished fifth in Survivor: Ünlüler vs. Gönüllüler, the fifth season of Show TV's Turkish version of the reality television game show Survivor, produced by Acun Media.

=== Yok Böyle Dans ===
In 2011, after heating up the stage on Yok Böyle Dans—the Turkish version of Dancing With the Stars—for weeks, Ulusoy won the show, along with her professional partner Vitali Kozmin. Subsequently, she acted in Show TV's comic science fiction series Ha Babam Uzay. She was cast as HRH The Princess Alev in Türk'ün Uzayla İmtihanı that was the identical successor of Ha Babam Uzay. She also hosted the backstage of Bugün Ne Giysem? which is a fashion competition on Show TV for one season before she became a judge on the show in 2012. Later that same year, she appeared as a special guest star in the thirty fourth episode of the Kanal D series Yalan Dünya as herself.

== Personal life ==
Ulusoy had been in a relationship with Hacı Sabancı, a member of the fourth generation of the renowned Sabancı family, since August 2011. However, they broke up in 2017.

== Filmography ==
Year	Title	Role	Notes
2003	Miss Universe 2003	Herself	Turkish participant; Channel: NBC and TVN Entertainment Corporation; Production: Donald Trump
2006–2007	Arka Sokaklar	Yeliz Balkan	Actress; Channel: Kanal D; TV-series; Production: Erler Film
2007–2008	Senin Uğruna	Burçak	Actress in leading role along with Rafet el Roman; Channel: FOX; TV series; Production: ABT
2008	Dilek Ağacı		Actress in leading role; TV series
2008–2009	Arka Sokaklar	Yeliz Balkan	Actress; Channel: Kanal D; TV-series; Production: Erler Film
2009	Ev		Guest starring; Movie; Production: Pinema Film
2010	Ateşe Yürümek	Rüya	Actress; Channel: Star TV; TV series; Production: Pastel Film
2011	Kutsal Damacana: Dracoola	Demet	Actress in leading role; Movie; Production: İyi Seyirler Film, Zero Film
2011	Survivor: Ünlüler vs. Gönüllüler	Herself	Competitor in the team of Ünlüler (Celebrities); Channel: Show TV; Game Show; Production: Acun Media
2011–2012	Yok Böyle Dans	Herself	Contestant on the second season of the Turkish version of "Dancing with the Stars", partnered with professional dancer Vitaly Kozmin; Channel: Show TV; Production: Acun Medya
2012	Ha Babam Uzay	Princess Alev	Actress in leading role; Channel: Show TV; TV series; Production: Süreç Film
2012	Türk'ün Uzayla İmtihanı	Princess Alev	Actress in leading role; Channel: Show TV; TV series succeeded by Ha Babam Uzay; Production: Süreç Film
2012	Bugün Ne Giysem?	Herself	Backstage host; Judge; Channel: Show TV
2012	Yalan Dünya	Herself	Special guest star; Channel: Kanal D
2012	O Ses Türkiye	Herself	Special guest star singing "Peri"; Channel: Star TV; Production: Acun Medya
2013	Romantik Komedi 2: Bekarlığa Veda	Gözde	Actress; Movie
2014	Muhteşem Yüzyıl	Anna Jagiellon	Actress; TV series
2014	Kadın İşi: Banka Soygunu	Nihal	Actress; Movie
2016	Genis Aile 2: Her Türlü	Şebnem	Actress; Movie
2022	Iliski Doktoru	Aylin	Actress in leading role; Movie

Awards and achievements
Preceded by Çağla Kubat (2002)	Miss Universe Turkey; 2003	Succeeded by Fatoş Seğmen (2004)
