= İbrahim Büyükak =

Turkish actor

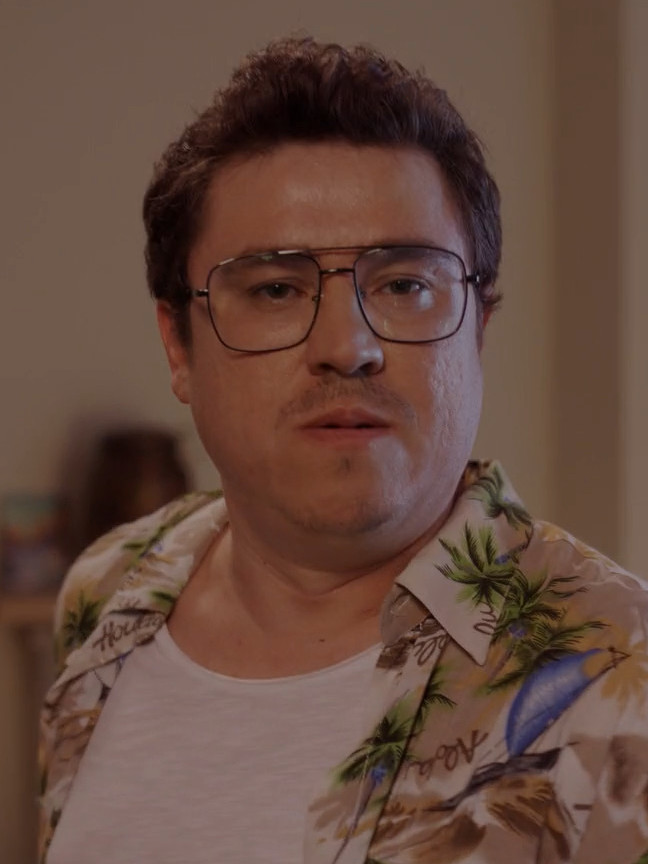
- İbrahim Büyükak at Kütahya Dumlupınar University, 2018
- Born: 20 August 1983 (age 42); Istanbul, Turkey
- Occupations: Columnist, actor, screenwriter, director, comedian, TV presenter
- Spouse: Nurdan Beşen (m. 2018)
- Children: 1

İbrahim Büyükak (born 20 August 1983) is a Turkish screenwriter, columnist, director, and actor.

== Personal Life and Career ==
His father was bongo drummer of Beyaz Kelebekler band. His sister was a violinist. His paternal family is of Turkish descent who immigrated from Bulgaria. His maternal family immigrated from Macedonia. He is a graduate of Uludağ University with a degree in economic studies. He and Oğuzhan Koç played in Bursaspor Young Football Team.

He worked as a columnist for Bursa's Olay newspaper and then contributed to Gırgır, Leman, Lemanyak and Atom magazines. He still writes in Kafa magazine. He is also a member of the BKM (Beşiktaş Culture Center).

In 2008, he joined the group of Zeynep Koçak, Oğuzhan Koç, and Eser Yenenler and worked as screenwriter for years. He started to play some roles in the script. He and Zeynep Koçak wrote the movie Küçük Esnaf together and also starred. The talk show 3 Adam, which he presented together with Koç and Yenenler, came to an end in 2017, and he started to pursue a solo career and has served as a screenwriter for comedy movies Yol Arkadaşım, in which he also starred. The movie sold ₺22.6 million in Turkey. He continued to write the script for the movies Yol Arkadaşım 2, Bayi Toplantısı and the series İlginç Bazı Olaylar. He is also the director of İlginç Bazı Olaylar.

== Filmography ==
Year	Title	Role	Notes
2008–2012	Çok Güzel Hareketler Bunlar	İbrahim	Theatre/Screenwriter/Actor
2009	Neşeli Hayat	Aytekin	Film/Actor
2011	Çok Filim Hareket Bunlar	İbrahim (İbo)	Film/Screenwriter/Actor
2013–2017	3 Adam	Himself	Talk Show/Screenwriter/Actor
2015	Bana Baba Dedi	Cüneyt	TV series/Script advisor/Actor
2016	Küçük Esnaf	Berhudar Bakır	Film/Screenwriter/Actor
2017	Yol Arkadaşım	Şeref	Film/Screenwriter/Actor
2018	Yol Arkadaşım 2	Şeref	Film/Screenwriter/Actor
2020	Bayi Toplantısı		Film/Screenwriter/Actor
2020	Tutunamayanlar		TV series (guest)/Actor
2021	İlginç Bazı Olaylar	İbrahim	Web series/Director/Screenwriter/Actor
2023	Özür Dilerim	Erkin	Film/Director/Screenwriter/Actor
