= Apak =

Apak is a Turkish masculine given name and surname. Notable people with the name include:

- Eşref Apak (born 1982), Turkish hammer thrower
- Sarp Apak, Turkish actor
- Sema Apak, married name of Sema Aydemir (born 1985), Turkish sprinter
