= Eyyvah Eyvah 3 =

2014 Turkish comedy film

- Theatrical release poster
- Directed by: Hakan Algül
- Written by: Ata Demirer
- Produced by: Necati Akpınar
- Starring: Demet Akbağ; Ata Demirer; Özge Borak; Salih Kalyon
- Cinematography: Gökhan Atılmış
- Edited by: Mustafa Gökçen
- Music by: Fahir Atakoğlu
- Production company: BKM Film
- Distributed by: UIP
- Release date: 31 January 2014
- Running time: 105 minutes
- Country: Turkey
- Language: Turkish
- Box office: 35,022,168 TL

Eyyvah Eyvah 3 is a 2014 Turkish comedy film starring Ata Demirer and Demet Akbağ. It was directed by Hakan Algül and is the third installment in the Eyyvah Eyvah film series.

== Cast ==
- Ata Demirer – Hüseyin Badem
- Demet Akbağ – Firuzan
- Özge Borak – Müjgan
- Serra Yılmaz – Mercedes
- Salih Kalyon – Halil
- Tarık Ünlüoğlu – Edremit
- Ayşe Nil Şamlıoğlu – Necla
- Teoman Kumbaracıbaşı – İspanyol
- Beyti Engin – Kasap
- Cengiz Bozkurt
- Şener Kökkaya
- Tanju Tuncel
- Meray Ülgen
- Caner Alkaya
- Şehsuvar Aktaş
- Hazım Körmükçü
- Hande Dane
- Elif Erdoğan
- Özkan Çınarlı
- Murat Serezli
- Kahraman Sivri
- Selahattin Taşdöğen
- Yeşim Ceren Bozoğlu
- Naci Taşdöğen
- Durul Bazan
- Erkan Can
- Onur Buldu
- Onur Atilla
- Selçuk Borak
- Ergün Kuyucu
- Cenk Tunalı
