= Asena Tuğal =

Turkish actress

- Born: 28 August 1984 (age 42); Istanbul, Turkey
- Education: Boğaziçi University
- Occupations: Television journalist, actress
- Television: TGRT, Kanal D and Show TV
- Spouse: Şahin Irmak

Asena Tuğal (born 28 August 1984) is a Turkish television journalist and actress. She presented on TGRT, Kanal D and Show TV in Turkey and on Rai Uno in Italy after having spent six years behind the scenes.

In 2006, Tuğal was selected 3rd runner up in the Miss Turkey beauty pageant. She went on to participate in the 2006 Miss International pageant.

== Biography ==
Tuğal received her bachelor's degree from Boğaziçi University with a double major in Maths and Science. She was awarded a Young Scientist Award from the Scientific and Technological Research Council of Turkey in the field of Chemistry.

Tuğal had a guest actress role in the TV comedy series "Akasya Durağı", which debuted in 2008 and broadcast by Kanal D. She played the character "Hande" in the 2009 TV drama series "Ömre Bedel" (Fox TV Turkey). In the TV high school series "Öğretmen Kemal" (Fox TV, 2010), she had a leading role as "Nehir".

Tuğal holds the black belt in taekwondo and competes on Turkey's national taekwondo team.

She also has a passion for origami.

== TV series ==
Year	Title	Role
2022	Erkek Severse	Işıl
2021	Masumiyet	Banu Kaya
2019–2020	Afili Aşk	Hülya Yiğiter
2017	Lise Devriyesi	Seda Sancak
2017	Eşkıya Dünyaya Hükümdar Olmaz	Zeynep Sağlam
2016	Kertenkele: Yeniden Doğuş	Zeynep Şanlı, Masked Woman
2015–2016	Filinta	Tabibe Leyla
2013	Tozlu Yollar	Vildan
2013	Aldırma Gönül	Nefise
2010	Öğretmen Kemal	Nehir
2009	Ömre Bedel	Hande
2008	Akasya Durağı	Ezgi
