= Eyyvah Eyvah 2 =

2011 Turkish comedy film

- Theatrical release poster
- Directed by: Hakan Algül
- Written by: Ata Demirer
- Produced by: Necati Akpınar
- Starring: Ata Demirer; Demet Akbağ; Salih Kalyon; Alican Yücesoy; Özge Borak
- Cinematography: Gökhan Atılmış
- Edited by: Mustafa Gökçen
- Music by: Serkan Çağrı; Fahir Atakoğlu
- Production company: BKM Film
- Distributed by: UIP
- Release date: 7 January 2011
- Country: Turkey
- Language: Turkish
- Box office: US$15,363,346

Eyyvah Eyvah 2 is a 2011 Turkish comedy film, directed by Hakan Algül, starring Ata Demirer as a young clarinet player who struggles to win back his fiancé after she moves to a small village in the Turkish countryside. The film, which opened on January 7, 2011 at number 1 in the Turkish box office, is a sequel to the hit comedy Eyyvah Eyvah (2010).

== Plot ==
Hüseyin (Ata Demirer), a clarinetist from a village in Turkey's Thracian region, tries to reach his fiancé, who works as a nurse in a village near Çanakkale, to give her a ring to win back her heart.

== Release ==
The film opened on nationwide general release in 357 screens across Turkey on January 7, 2011 at number 1 in the national box office with a first weekend gross of US$5,170,314.

== Reception ==
The film was number 1 in the Turkish national box office for three weeks running and has made a total gross of US$15,363,346.
