= Kutsal Damacana: Dracoola =

2011 film by Korhan Bozkurt

- Theatrical poster
- Directed by: Korhan Bozkurt
- Written by: Ahmet Yılmaz
- Produced by: Şenol Zencir; Selin Altınel
- Starring: Ersin Korkut; Şahin Irmak; Özge Ulusoy
- Cinematography: Ferhan Akgün
- Edited by: Engin Öztürk
- Production companies: Iyi Seyirler Film; Zero Film
- Distributed by: Tiglon
- Release date: January 21, 2011
- Country: Turkey
- Language: Turkish
- Budget: US$2,500,000

Kutsal Damacana: Dracoola is a 2011 Turkish comedy film, directed by Korhan Bozkurt, starring Ersin Korkut as a servant for a well-to-do family which is visited by legendary bloodsucker Count Dracoola. The film, which went on nationwide general release across Turkey on January 21, 2011, is the second sequel to the hit comedy Kutsal Damacana (2007) following Kutsal Damacana 2: İtmen (2010).

== Production ==
The film was shot on location in Istanbul, Turkey.

== Synopsis ==
Sebahattin grew up eating birdseed after being abandoned in the yard of a mosque when he was a baby boy. A self-taught young man, Sebahattin starts working as a servant for a well-to-do family, where he develops an unrequited love towards the family's beautiful daughter, Demet. However, his platonic happiness will not be long-lived when the servants' wing of the mansion is visited one night by the legendary bloodsucker Count Dracoola.

== Release ==
=== Premiere ===
The film premiered at a special gala showing on January 19, 2011 at İstinye Park AFM Theater in Istanbul, where, due to a controversial regulations from the Tobacco Products and Alcoholic Beverages Market (TAPDK), organizers had to cancel plans to serve alcohol.

=== General release ===
The film opened on nationwide general release in 221 screens across Turkey on January 21 at number 2 in the national box office with a first weekend gross of US$520,818.
