= Kutsal Damacana 2: İtmen =

- Film poster
- Directed by: Korhan Bozkurt
- Written by: Şafak Sezer
- Produced by: Selin Altınel; Şenol Zencir
- Starring: Şafak Sezer; Mustafa Üstündağ; Tuğba Karaca
- Cinematography: Selahattin Sancaklı
- Edited by: Hakan Akol; Doğuş Onur Karasu
- Music by: Övünç Dan
- Production companies: Iyi Seyirler Film; Zero Film
- Distributed by: Özen Film; Kinostar
- Release date: January 22, 2010
- Running time: 98 mins
- Country: Turkey
- Language: Turkish
- Box office: $4,974,673

Kutsal Damacana 2: İtmen is a 2010 Turkish comedy film, directed by Korhan Bozkurt, starring Şafak Sezer as a sailor who returns to Istanbul, following misadventures with Somali pirates and a sojourn in a Buddhist monastery, to do battle with a werewolf. The film, which went on nationwide general release across Turkey on January 22, 2010, was one of the highest grossing Turkish films of 2010. It is a sequel to Kutsal Damacana (2007) and was followed by Kutsal Damacana: Dracoola (2011).

== Production ==
The film was shot on location in Istanbul, Turkey.

== Plot ==
Fikret tried several ways to get rid of the genie inside of a girl with Asım a few years ago. Fikret and Asım's paths are separated after the girl gets rid of the spell of the priest. Later, Fikret meets his friend Serkan in a Buddhist temple. When Fikret makes a wrong move here, he is thrown out of the temple with Serkan and returns to Istanbul. Here they meet with Müjdat, and they yearn.

One morning, Fikret and Müjdat go to a tender to buy some items. They get a painting from here. But this painting is cursed, and the werewolf in the painting passes to Müjdat. Then Müjdat gradually turns into a werewolf and starts to hurt everyone. Priest Master takes action and manages to remove the werewolf from Mujdat, but Müjdat dies.

== Release ==
The film opened across Germany on January 21, 2010 and Turkey and Austria on January 22 at number one in the Turkish box office chart with an opening weekend gross of $1,429,779.

== Reception ==
=== Box office ===
The film has made a total worldwide gross of $4,974,673.
