= Kutsal Damacana =

2007 Turkish comedy film

- Theatrical poster
- Directed by: Kamil Aydın
- Written by: Ahmet Yılmaz
- Produced by: Şenol Zencir
- Starring: Şafak Sezer; Settar Tanrıöğen; Yıldırım Memişoğlu; Ersin Korkut; Eyşan Özhim; Erdal Tosun; Belgin Bilgin; Ferhat Yılmaz; Ufuk Yıldırım; Şahin Irmak; Büşra Pekin; Murat Eken; Metin Yıldız
- Music by: Ercan Saatçi
- Production company: Zero Film
- Distributed by: Özen Film
- Release date: December 21, 2007
- Running time: 105 minutes
- Country: Turkey
- Language: Turkish
- Box office: US$4,866,495

Kutsal Damacana is a 2007 Turkish comedy film, directed by Kamil Aydın, starring Şafak Sezer as a man who disguises himself as a priest to help remove a spell. The film, which went on nationwide general release across Turkey on December 21, 2007, was one of the highest-grossing Turkish films of 2007 and was followed by the sequels Kutsal Damacana 2: İtmen (2010) and Kutsal Damacana: Dracoola (2011).

== Production ==
The film was shot on location in Istanbul, Turkey.

== Synopsis ==
Former sailor Fikret is having trouble settling into his new life in Istanbul and has begun to make use of the local church’s facilities. When the priest Artin goes on a trip to the Vatican, Fikret starts selling off the church's cellar of expensive wines and stays in the priest's room at night. Fikret spends most of his remaining time gambling on horse races and lecturing Asim, a naïve young boy working at the car wash located next door to the church who perceives him as a surrogate as a father figure. Fikret and Asim learn of a rich widowed businesswoman, Deniz, who thinks that her sister, Selen, has had a spell put upon her and is prepared to pay anything to have it lifted. Fikret decides to go to Deniz's house disguised as a priest but gets more than he bargained for.

== Release ==
The film opened on general release in 156 screens across Turkey on December 21, 2007 at number three in the Turkish box office chart with an opening weekend gross of US$1,037,596.

== Reception ==
The film was one of the highest grossing Turkish films of 2007 with a total gross of US$3,721,075.
