= The Ottoman Republic =

- Theatrical poster
- Directed by: Gani Müjde
- Written by: Gani Müjde; Fatih Solmaz; Emre Bülbül
- Produced by: Şükrü Avşar
- Starring: Ata Demirer; Vildan Atasever; Sümer Tilmaç; Ali Düşenkalkar; Atilla Olgaç; Ruhsar Öcal; Ceyhun Yılmaz; Sezen Aksu
- Cinematography: Uğur İçbak
- Edited by: Mustafa Preşeva
- Music by: Sezen Aksu
- Production company: Avşar Film
- Distributed by: United International Pictures
- Release date: November 21, 2008
- Running time: 100 mins
- Country: Turkey
- Language: Turkish
- Budget: US$ 2,000,000
- Box office: US$ 8,689,739

The Ottoman Republic (Turkish: Osmanlı Cumhuriyeti) is a 2008 Turkish comedy film directed by Gani Müjde. The film, which stars Ata Demirer, is a political comedy built upon the question, "What would have happened if Mustafa Kemal Atatürk never existed?" It went on general release across Turkey on November 21, 2008 and is the fourth-highest-grossing Turkish film of 2008.

== Synopsis ==
The year is 1888. A 7-year-old child was first seen running on a vast field to scare the crows off of the meadows of Thessalonica, and then he falls from a tree while reaching out to a nightingale. Everything goes black. The child who falls from the tree is Mustafa, who would have grown to become the founder of the Republic of Turkey and be given the surname Atatürk, that is, if he did not fall to his coma that day. The film fast-forwards to over a century later into the year 2007. Without Mustafa Kemal Atatürk in Turkey's history, no War of Independence has been fought, Ankara has not become the country's capital, and the country continues its existence as the Ottoman Republic, ruled by the Sultan Osman VII (Ata Demirer), who has become little more than a figurehead and a source of ridicule by foreign dignitaries, especially by the United States.

At first, he emerges from his palace as Janissaries play a march for him. Outside the palace, several protesters who objected to foreign interference in Ottoman affairs were suppressed by the police. He then prays at a mosque, before the next scenes focus on his wife's shopping.

The film then focuses on the various political intrigues of ruling an Ottoman Empire under American mandate, including scheming advisors; clashes between the modern, 21st century Istanbul, and the old fashionned aestethics; and a love affair between the Sultan and an anti-occupation activist.

For all of his bumbling antics, the Sultan was forced to abdicate for his failed administration, and was exiled. The scene shifts from the Istanbul harbour back to the wheat fields of Thessalonica, as the boy Mustafa recovers from his coma. He gets up and runs off beating a can with a stick, as a voice-over of one of his future speeches plays in the background.

== Release ==
The film opened on general release in 205 screens across Turkey on November 21, 2008 at number one in the Turkish box office chart with a worldwide opening weekend gross of $1,988,968.

Opening weekend gross
Date	Territory	Screens	Rank	Gross
November 21, 2008	Turkey	205	1	$1,988,968
November 20, 2008	Germany	35	7	$319,505
November 21, 2008	Belgium	6	12	$36,770
November 20, 2008	Netherlands	-	11	$34,948
November 21, 2008	Austria	5	15	$20,472
November 28, 2008	United Kingdom	1	39	$7,787

== Reception ==
=== Box office ===
The movie was number one at the Turkish box office for two weeks running and was the fourth-highest-grossing Turkish film of 2009 with a total gross of $7,746,467. It remained in the Turkish box-office charts for nineteen weeks and made a total worldwide gross of $8,689,739.

=== Reviews ===
In his latest historical comedy, popular satirist and TV writer, Gani Müjde, travels on similar turf, to his debut feature "Kahpe Bizans" (The Perfidious Byzantium), which poked fun at the earlier nationalist films of Turkish cinema, introduces Hürriyet Daily News reviewer Emrah Güler, who concludes, both Gani Müjde and Ata Demirer are favorite household names who never fail to put a smile on followers of Turkish pop culture.
