= Fırıldak Ailesi =

- Genre: Animated sitcom Satire
- Created by: Varol Yaşaroğlu
- Voices of: Demet Akbağ; Bülent Kayabaş; Keremcan Köse; Tülay Bursa; Tülay Köneçoğlu; Oya Küçümen
- Composers: Cem Tuncer; Nail Yurtsever
- Country of origin: Turkey
- Original language: Turkish
- No. of seasons: 3
- No. of episodes: 80

Production
- Executive producer: Varol Yaşaroğlu
- Running time: 25 minutes

Original release
- Network: Star TV (2013), Grafi2000 Youtube Channel (2013-2016), teve2 (2014), TV8 (2015-2016)
- Release: February 11, 2013 – July 27, 2016

The Fırıldak Family (Turkish: Fırıldak Ailesi) is a Turkish animated sitcom created by Varol Yaşaroğlu for the Star TV. It depicts the life of a Turkish family in a comical way.

== Characters ==
=== Main characters ===
Characters	Voice actors
Sabri Fırıldak	Bülent Kayabaş
Yıldız Fırıldak	Demet Akbağ
Dürdane Çektir	Tülay Bursa
Afet Fırıldak	Tülay Köneçoğlu
Zeki Fırıldak	Keremcan Köse
Tosun Fırıldak	Oya Küçümen
