= Reem Kelani =

British Palestinian musician (born 1963)

Reem Kelani (born 1963) is a British Palestinian musician. She was born in Manchester, England, and was initially influenced by the jazz music her father played on his record player. Her interest in Palestinian music was sparked by the music at a family wedding in her maternal home in Galilee in the 1970s.

== Biography ==
Kelani was born in Manchester, England, the daughter of Yousef Zaid Kelani (1925– ), a physician and endocrinologist from Yabad near Jenin in the West Bank, and Yusra Sharif Zu'bi (1931–2004), a homemaker from Nazareth in the Galilee. She was brought up and educated in Kuwait, graduating from Kuwait University with a degree in Biology.

Kelani is a maternal cousin of Haneen Zoabi, the first Palestinian Israeli woman to be elected to the Knesset, a relative of Shawkat Kelani, a prominent doctor and co-founder of An-Najah University in Nablus, and the great-niece of Wajih al-Kaylani, Shaykh al-Islam of the Philippines.

== Music ==
Kelani started singing at the age of four, and she recalls it as one of the most profound experiences of her life. She continued singing as an amateur and semi-professional singer until she went professional in 1990. She studied piano as a child, exposing her to Western classical music, of which her father was an avid listener. Her father’s early fascination with Fred Astaire's black-and-white films introduced Kelani to the music of George Gershwin and Irving Berlin, the jazz elements of which can be heard in her music and her choice of a band based around a Jazz rhythm section, alongside traditional Arabic instruments.

Kelani has spoken publicly about a turning point when, as a teenager, she attended a family wedding in the village of Nein outside Nazareth and became interested in Palestinian and Arabic music. She has also described Kuwait as "a country whose rich musical heritage remains an essential part of my personal and collective soundscape."

In Kuwait in 1988, Kelani organised and led a major fundraising show called "I Got Rhythm" for the British charity Medical Aid for Palestinians, MAP, the organisation which employed Dr. Pauline Cutting O.B.E. and Dr. Ang Swee Chai in Bourj al-Barajneh camp in Beirut. In 2003, Kelani performed alongside Guy Barker and his band on the BBC World Service's World Cafe. For the programme, Kelani performed her unique blending of George Gershwin's "The Half of It, Dearie' Blues" with traditional Palestinian singing.

Kelani's solo album Sprinting Gazelle—Palestinian Songs from the Motherland and the Diaspora, released in 2006, represented the culmination of many years of research and preparation.

In January 2007, Kelani led a tour of Syria, performing twice at the Opera House in Damascus and once at the Directorate of Culture in Aleppo. Organised by the British Council, Reem brought together for the tour a bespoke line-up comprising three of her UK musicians and three from Syria: Amir Qara Jouli (violin), Basel Rajoub (saxophones), and Simon Mreach (percussion).

Later in 2007, Kelani also undertook a commission from the Manchester International Festival to compose a 30-minute piece for performance at the Festival with the Beating Wing Orchestra, which comprises refugee musicians. The resulting work, "Paradise in Strangers," explored universal themes such as migration, suffering, parting, reunion, and celebration. It featured poetry and prose written by Reem and members of the orchestra, as well as verses by Robert Burns (A Slave's Lament) and Salma Khadra Jayyusi (Rootless).

In May 2008, Kelani produced and performed a unique arrangement of traditional Gaelic and Palestinian songs with Gaelic singer Catriona Watt. for A’ Gharaids, a series of programmes looking at the state of Gaelic music. A’ Gharaids was made for BBC Alba, the Gaelic television channel, and presented by Mary Ann Kennedy. The series was subsequently nominated for the Media Award in the MG ALBA Traditional Music Awards 2009.

In October 2008, Kelani collaborated with the Portuguese Fado singer, Liana, on a special commission for the Musicport Festival, Whitby, entitled "From Palestine to Portugal". The project was funded by the Calouste Gulbenkian Foundation and Visiting Arts. It involved the mixing of Palestinian and Portuguese poetry, the verse of Mahmoud Darwish and Jose Saramago, and Arabic and Portuguese voices. The production was later reprised in a performance at the Tabernacle W11 in December 2009.

Kelani's work has adopted a notable profile in Turkey. She first performed in Turkey in June 2005 at the Cemal Resit Rey Concert Hall, as part of Istanbul municipality's conference on "Women from the Middle East." This was followed, in November 2008, by her concert at the Babylon Club in Istanbul, on the occasion of the British Council's visiting "Lure of the East" exhibition of Orientalist painting at the Pera Museum. For this concert, Kelani and her trio were joined by Selim Sesler, the legendary Turkish gypsy clarinetist, and they performed a range of songs from Kelani's Palestinian and Egyptian repertoire.

Among the audience that day was Osman Kavala, the Turkish philanthropist and founder of Anadolu Kültür. He saw a natural partnership between Kelani, with her representation of Palestinian culture, and Kardes Turkuler, which is one of the musical arms of the collective organization BGST. And so Kelani performed as a special guest with Kardes Turkuler at their June 2009 concert in the Turkcell Kuruçeşme Arena, Istanbul.

In October 2009, Kelani also performed with her Anglo-Syrian band at a major women’s festival in Nusaybin, southeast Turkey.

Kelani’s association with Kardes Turkuler continued in April 2014 with a joint concert at TIM Maslak in Istanbul which attracted considerable interest in the Turkish media.

Alongside her performances with her own musicians, Kelani is a member of The Anti-Capitalist Roadshow. It is a collective of singers and songwriters comprising Frankie Armstrong, Roy Bailey (folk singer), Robb Johnson, Sandra Kerr, Grace Petrie, Leon Rosselson, Janet Russell, Peggy Seeger, Jim Woodland, plus socialist magician, Ian Saville.

After the release of her Sprinting Gazelle, Kelani began her next project focused on the Egyptian composer Sayyid Darwish. Kelani explained this decision in her article for the Journal of Palestinian Refugee Studies. The project will comprise the arrangement, performance, and recording of a selection of Darwish's songs for a double album, plus the writing of two booklets in Arabic and English about the composer and his songs.

In May 2014, Kelani performed as a soloist with the Bergen Philharmonic Orchestra in the Bergen National Opera's production of English composer Orlando Gough's major work entitled "Stemmer."

== Discography ==
Kelani released her debut solo CD Sprinting Gazelle – Palestinian Songs from the Motherland and the Diaspora in February 2006.

To mark the 25th anniversary of Amos Trust in 2010, a group of artists from around the world recorded Under the Influence – The Garth Hewitt Songbook Volume 1. Reem contributed her rendition of Garth's "Oh Palestine."

In 2012, Kelani contributed two songs to the compilation album Celebrating Subversion – The Anti-Capitalist Roadshow. She sang a duet with Leon Rosselson in one song, his "Song of the Olive Tree." Kelani's second song was a powerful Tunisian anthem, "Babour Zammar." Also known as The Migration Anthem, this Tunisian song was written in the 1970s, inspired by the students' revolution in France. 'Amm El-Mouldi Zalilah, a champion of colloquial poetry, worked as a sweeper for the Tunisian Rail Company. Hédi Guella, this song's composer and original performer, was a leading political singer. "The only difference between the émigrés and the cattle," the song concludes, "is the passport!" The album was reviewed by Raymond Deane in the Irish Left Review and by Robin Denselow in the Guardian.

Kelani's next album project was her "Live at the Tabernacle." Released in 2016 and recorded live at The Tabernacle, Notting Hill, it includes songs from Palestine and the wider Arab world. It is a powerful demonstration that Kelani is "not so much a singer as a performer and a communicator."

== Radio ==
Kelani is a regular broadcaster on BBC Radio Four.

In 1995, Kelani co-presented "A Day in the Life of a Palestinian Woman" for the BBC World Service. The programme was produced by Sara Bradshaw.

In 1997, Kelani performed traditional Palestinian songs for "Your Land is My Land," a documentary series for Radio Four to mark the 50th anniversary of the expulsion of the Palestinians on the creation of the state of Israel. The series was presented by Tim Llewellyn and produced by Vanessa Harrison.

Also, Kelani wrote and presented Distant Chords (2001–2003) for Radio Four, featuring the music of migrant communities in the UK. The documentaries comprised:

1. "Can you stop the Birds Singing" on the Afghan community.
2. "Yemeni Echoes in a Northern Town" on the Yemeni community.
3. "Songs on a Mountain Wind" on the Kurdish community.
4. "My Book, My Mountain, Myself" on the Armenian community. It was made Pick of the Day by The Guardian.
5. "Islands Here, Islands There" on the Micronesian community.
6. "A Strange Way of Life (Estranha forma de vida)" on the Portuguese community.

In 2004, Kelani played Scheherazade in BBC Radio Four's programme entitled "A Thousand and One"(a series about the influence of The Arabian Nights on Western culture).

Also in 2004, Kelani appeared as a guest of Sandi Toksvig on BBC Radio Four's Excess Baggage, alongside Sir James Galway and singer-songwriter Glenn Tilbrook.

In 2006, Kelani was featured as a guest on BBC Radio Four's Woman's Hour.

In 2007, Kelani explored Salome's Dance of the Seven Veils on BBC Radio Four.

In 2012, Kelani wrote and presented "Songs for Tahrir" on BBC Radio Four about her experiences of music in the 2011 uprising in Egypt. She also relates more of her experiences in her programme blog.

In December 2012, Kelani contributed in interviews and with songs to the BBC World Service's Lullabies in the Arab World.

In January 2013, Kelani's music was used in BBC Radio Four's dramatisation of "The Brick," written by the Palestinian writer Selma Dabbagh.

== Film and television ==
For BBC 2's Everyman series in 1992, Kelani wrote original music for See No Evil on the Sabra and Shatila massacre in Beirut in 1982. Stephen Walker produced the film. Kelani also did simultaneous interpreting and subtitling.

In 1998, Kelani worked as an Associate Producer for a series of films entitled The Unholy Land as part of Channel Four's Israel 50 season. She also provided Arabic vocals in the theme music composed by Howard Davidson. The series director was Colin Luke.

Kelani wrote and performed the title music for the film Les Chebabs de Yarmouk, released in 2013 which was released in 2013. Produced by the French filmmaker Axel Salvatori-Sinz, it follows a group of young men and women in the Palestinian refugee settlement of Yarmouk Camp outside Damascus. For the title track, Iyad Hayatleh, the Glasgow-based Palestinian poet and son of Yarmouk, wrote the verse, which Kelani then set to music.

== Awards and nominations ==
Year	Work	Award	Category	Result
2005		Glastonbury Festival	Glastonbury unsigned bands	Finalist
2007		Paul Hamlyn Foundation Breakthrough Fund		Nominated
2008	Arab-British Culture and Society Award	Special commendation for "notable contribution to our knowledge and understanding of the life, society and culture of the Arab people”		Nominated
2009	Scottish Traditional Music Awards	BBC Alba's A'Gharaids series, featuring a special collaboration by Reem Kelani and Gaelic singer Catriona Watt		Nominated
2012	Forum of Creative Arab Women	Kelani was selected to represent Palestine and to deliver a presentation at this prestigious Arab women's conference		Nominated
2013	Arab British Centre Award for Culture	Special commendation for "notable contribution to our knowledge and understanding of the life, society and culture of the Arab people”		Shortlisted
2013	Field training and research followed by workshops in UK schools	Arts Council of England	Grants for the Arts	Awarded
