= Yılmaz Erdoğan =

Turkish actor, filmmaker, and poet (born 1967)

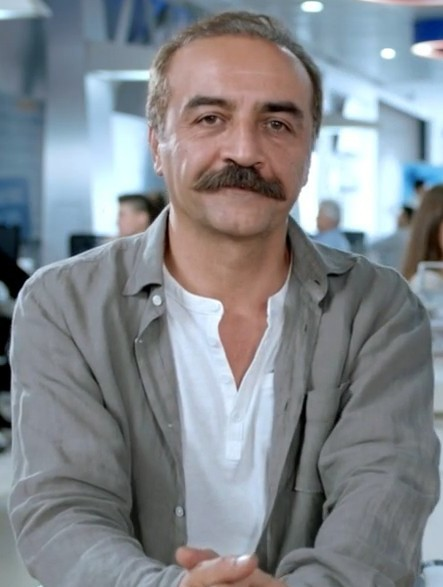
- Born: 4 November 1967 (age 58); Hakkâri, Turkey
- Occupations: Actor, screenwriter, director, poet
- Years active: 1995–present
- Spouse(s): Sanem Oktar (m. 1993; div. 1998) Belçim Bilgin (m. 2006; div. 2018)
- Children: 2
- Website: yilmazerdogan.com

Yılmaz Erdoğan (born 4 November 1967) is a Turkish filmmaker, actor and poet who is most famous for his box-office record-breaking debut comedy film Vizontele (2001) and the television series Bir Demet Tiyatro (1995–2002/2006–2007). He founded BKM Theatre and Film Production. He was awarded the Best Supporting Actor at 4th Australian Academy of Cinema and Television Arts Awards for his performance in The Water Diviner (2014).

== Early life ==
Yilmaz Erdoğan born in Hakkari, a predominantly Kurdish city, but spent his childhood in Ankara until he moved to Istanbul along with his family. He is of Kurdish origin. In 1987, he dropped out of his civil engineering studies at Istanbul Technical University. His brothers are Mustafa Erdoğan, who founded Fire of Anatolia, and Deniz Erdoğan, who has composed music for some of his company's productions. His cousin is actor Ersin Korkut. His former wife is the actress and costume designer Belçim Bilgin, a descendant from the family of Sheikh Said, the leader of the Sheikh Said Rebellion and his daughter Berfin Erdoğan appeared in Organize İşler.

== Career ==
He joined the Nöbetçi Tiyatrosu managed by veteran actor Ferhan Şensoy. In 1988, he founded his own theatre company, Güldüşündürü, and staged a successful production of his self-penned Kanuni Sultan Süleyman ve Rambo.

He also became chief screenwriter at Levent Kırca and his wife Oya Başar long-running television sketch show, Olacak O Kadar.

In 1994, he founded Beşiktaş Cultural Center (Turkish: Beşiktaş Kültür Merkezi) with business partner Necati Akpınar. He achieved recognition as Mükremin Abi alongside actress Demet Akbağ in the ground breaking television series with audience Bir Demet Tiyatro (1995–2002) on Star TV.

He also continued his theatrical success with a series of plays and musicals, including his one-man show, Cebimdeki Kelimeler, and recorded a poetry album called, Kayıp Kentin Yakışıklısı, which includes seventeen poems accompanied by traditional Turkish music composed by Metin Kalender, Nizamettin Ariç and Ali Aykaç.

Also, He founded professial sketch crew in BKM Theatre for TV. The sketch series Güldür Güldür directed by iconic comedian Kemal Sunal's son Ali Sunal. The child sketch series Güldüy Güldüy directed by Kemal Sunal's daughter Ezo Sunal. Yılmaz Erdoğan directed sketch Çok Güzel Hareketler Bunlar for both screenwriter and actor.

He achieved his greatest success with the box-office record breaking comedy films Vizontele (2001) and Vizontele Tuuba (2004), which he wrote, directed and starred in. This was followed by a sequel Organize İşler (2005), which he also produced, and Organize İşler: Sazan Sarmalı (2019). In "Vizontele" and "Organize İşler", He worked as actors with comedians Cem Yılmaz, Tolga Çevik, Ata Demirer who wrote own films .

A second run for his popular television series Bir Demet Tiyatro (2006–2007) followed on ATV, and the Christmas comedy film Neşeli Hayat (2009). He has also produced the successful comedy films Eyyvah Eyvah (2010) and Çok Filim Hareketler Bunlar (2010).

== Filmography ==
TV series
Year	Title	Credited as					Notes
Year	Title	Director	Producer	Writer	Actor	Role	Notes
1988	Olacak O Kadar			Yes	No		Sketch series
1992–1993	Umut Taksi			Yes	Yes	Halit Akyüz	Television series
1994	Yaseminname			Yes	Yes	Sürahi Nine's grandchild	Television series
1995–2002	Bir Demet Tiyatro			Yes	Yes	Mükremin Çıtır	Star TV television series
2006–2007	Bir Demet Tiyatro			Yes	Yes	Mükremin Çıtır	ATV television series
2024	İnci Taneleri			Yes	Yes	Azem Yücedağ	Kanal D television series

Films
Year	Title	Credited as					Notes
Year	Title	Director	Producer	Writer	Actor	Role	Notes
2001	Vizontele	Yes		Yes	Yes	Crazy Emin	
2004	Vizontele Tuuba	Yes	Yes	Yes	Yes	Crazy Emin	
2005	Organize İşler	Yes		Yes	Yes	Asım Noyan	
2009	Neşeli Hayat	Yes		Yes	Yes		
2010	Eyyvah Eyvah		Yes				
2010	Çok Filim Hareketler Bunlar		Yes				
2011	Bir Zamanlar Anadolu'da				Yes		Directed by Nuri Bilge Ceylan.
2012	Rhino Season				Yes		
2013	Kelebeğin Rüyası	Yes		Yes	Yes	Behçet Necatigil	
2014	The Water Diviner				Yes	Major Hasan	
2016	Ekşi Elmalar	Yes		Yes	Yes	Aziz Özay	
2018	Organize İşler: Sazan Sarmalı	Yes		Yes	Yes	Asım Noyan	
2021	Sen Hiç Ateşböceği Gördün mü?			Yes	Yes	Somer Yoğurtçuoğlu	
2021	Kin			Yes	Yes	Harun	
2021	Aşkın Kıyameti			Yes			
2022	Cici				Yes		

== Theater ==
Year	Play	Role	Awards	Notes
	Kadınlık Bizde Kalsın			Writer
1995	Otogargara			Writer
1995	Cebimde Kelimeler			Writer - solo performance
2000	Sen Hiç Ateş Böceği Gördün mü?		Cevat Fehmi Başkut Special Award	Writer and director
2003	Bana Bir Şeyhler Oluyor			Writer
2004	Haybeden Gerçeküstü Aşk			Writer
2008–2011	Çok Güzel Hareketler Bunlar			Creator
2008	Hanımhanımcık			Writer
2019–	Çok Güzel Hareketler 2			Creator

== Books ==
Year	Book	Type	ISBN	Notes
4th Edition 2004	Feriştah'ın Fentezileri	Humor	ISBN 9789755702261	Dialogues from the TV series Bir Demet Tiyatro
	Cebimde Kelimeler	Humor - play		
	Otogargara	Play - humor		
2003	Hijyenik Aşklar	Essay - humor	ISBN 9789755701851	Published in the book Kısa Güldürü Hikâyeleri
	Anladım	Poem	ISBN 9789755701202	
18th Edition	Haybeden Gerçeküstü Konuşmalar	Humor - play	ISBN 9789755701004	Later turned into a play
24th Edition 2000	Hüzünbaz Sevişmeler	Essay	ISBN 9789755700069	
9th Edition	Kadınlık Bizde Kalsın	Humor - play	ISBN 9789755700052	
26th Edition	Kayıp Kentin Yakışıklısı	Poem	ISBN 9789755700182	
2006	Laz Bakkal ile Tombalak	Humor	ISBN 9789755702810	Dialogues from the TV series Bir Demet Tiyatro
5th Edition 2005	Bana Bir Şeyhler Oluyor	Humor - play	ISBN 9789755702483	
4th Edition 2009	Sahiler Düş Düşler Sahi	Poem	ISBN 9789755703893	
