= Özge Borak =

Turkish actress (born 1982)

- Born: 14 February 1982 (age 43); Istanbul, Turkey
- Occupation: Actress
- Years active: 1990–present
- Spouse(s): Bülent Şakrak (m. 2006; div. 2010) Ata Demirer (m. 2012; div. 2014)

Özge Borak (born 14 February 1982) is a Turkish actress. Her family are ballet dancer and choreographer. She graduated from theatre department of Istanbul University State Conservatory.

She is best known for the franchise comedy films Eyyvah Eyvah. She worked as actor for numerous different roles in theatrical Güldür Güldür Show which were released on ShowTv. She had leading role in hit series such as Eşref Saati, Ihlamurlar Altında, Sultan Makamı. With Hande Soral, she played in period series "Bir Günah Gibi" which based from novel "Kurt Seyt ve Murka" and 2-3 seasons of "Küçük Kadınlar".

In April 2012 she married the comedian Ata Demirer. The couple later got divorced in November 2014.

== Filmography ==
Year	Title	Role
2025-	Kizilcik Serbeti	Salkim Ünal
2021	Menajerimi Ara	Ceyda
2017–2018	İstanbullu Gelin	Begüm Bakir
2016	Kırgın Çiçekler	
2013	Bir Yastıkta	Ahsen
2012	Leyla ile Mecnun	Pakize
2011	Bir Günah Gibi	
2009–2011	Küçük Kadınlar	Eylül
2007–2009	Eşref Saati	Reyhan
2005–2007	Ihlamurlar Altında	Elif
2003–2004	Sultan Makamı	Aydın Bulut - (Nazlım)
2003	Kara Gün	Cem Akyoldaş

=== Film ===
Year	Title	Role
2016	Benim Adım Feridun	Ayla
2016	Dedemin Fişi	Nurgül
2015	Bana Adını Sor	
2014	Eyyvah Eyvah 3	Müjgan
2011	Eyyvah Eyvah 2	Müjgan
2010	Eyyvah Eyvah	Müjgan
2009	Roja Reş	Rozêrîn
2005	Ömer Seyfettin Hikâyeleri: Fon Sadristsyn Karısı ve Oğlu	

=== Programming ===
Year	Title	Role
2022	Maske Kimsin Sen?	Self
2019	Kuaförüm Sensin	Herself (presenter)
2013–2015	Güldür Güldür Show	Nezaket
