= Money Trap (film) =

2019 film directed by Yılmaz Erdoğan

- Film poster
- Turkish: Organize İşler: Sazan Sarmalı
- Directed by: Yılmaz Erdoğan
- Written by: Yılmaz Erdoğan
- Produced by: Necati Akpınar
- Starring: Yılmaz Erdoğan; Kıvanç Tatlıtuğ; Ezgi Mola; Bensu Soral; Rıza Kocaoğlu
- Cinematography: Jean-Paul Seresin
- Music by: Ozan Çolakoğlu
- Production company: BKM Film
- Distributed by: CJ Entertainment Turkey; Netflix
- Release date: February 1, 2019
- Running time: 121 minutes
- Country: Turkey
- Language: Turkish

Money Trap (Turkish: Organize İşler: Sazan Sarmalı, lit. 'Organized Works: Carp Helix') is a 2019 Turkish comedy film directed and written by Yılmaz Erdoğan. It is a sequel to first film Organize İşler.

== Cast ==
- Yılmaz Erdoğan as Asım Noyan
- Kıvanç Tatlıtuğ as Sarı Saruhan
- Ezgi Mola as Lerzan Berrak
- Bensu Soral as Nazlı Noyan
- Rıza Kocaoğlu as Arıza Rıza
- Okan Çabalar as Taklaci Ziya
- Güven Kıraç as Ihsan
- Ahmet Mümtaz Taylan as Kerami
- Ersin Korkut as Pokémon Ersin
- Erdem Baş as Dombili Hayri
- Atakan Çelik as Bahadir
- Safa Sari as Naim Kulunç
- Mahir İpek as Taci
- Selen Esen Çelebi as Tarçın
- Ekin Türkmen as Ecem
- Ugur Bilgin as Commissar
