= Yetenek Sizsiniz Türkiye =

Turkish television series

- Created by: Simon Cowell
- Directed by: Şafak Bakkalbaşıoğlu
- Presented by: Tanem Sivar; Kübra Subaşı; Alp Kırşan
- Judges: Eda Ece; Şevval Sam; İlker Ayrık; Hande Yener; Former: Acun Ilıcalı; Hülya Avşar; Ali Taran; Sergen Yalçın; Murat Boz; Özgü Namal; Eser Yenenler; Seda Bakan
- Country of origin: Turkey
- Original language: Turkish
- No. of seasons: 9

Production
- Producers: Acun Medya (2009–2018); O3 Medya (2025)
- Running time: 3 hours

Original release
- Network: Show TV (2009–2012); Star TV (2012–2014); TV8 (2014–2018); Now (2025)
- Release: October 10, 2009 – August 20, 2025

Yetenek Sizsiniz Türkiye is the Turkish version of the Got Talent format.

== Hosts and judges ==
Series	Hosts		Judges (sitting order)			
Series	Hosts		1	2	3	4
1	Tanem Sivar	—N/a	Acun Ilıcalı	Hülya Avşar	Ali Taran	—N/a
2	Kübra Subaşı	—N/a	Acun Ilıcalı	Hülya Avşar	Ali Taran	—N/a
3	Kübra Subaşı	—N/a	Acun Ilıcalı	Hülya Avşar	Sergen Yalçın	—N/a
4	Alp Kırşan	—N/a	Acun Ilıcalı	Hülya Avşar	Sergen Yalçın	—N/a
5	Alp Kırşan	—N/a	Acun Ilıcalı	Hülya Avşar	Eser Yenenler	—N/a
6	Alp Kırşan	—N/a	Acun Ilıcalı	Özgü Namal	Murat Boz	Eser Yenenler
7	Alp Kırşan	—N/a	Eser Yenenler	Seda Bakan	Ali Taran	—N/a
8	Alp Kırşan	—N/a	Acun Ilıcalı	Hülya Avşar	Ali Taran	—N/a
9	Alp Kırşan	Beyza Şekerci	İlker Ayrık	Eda Ece	Hande Yener	Şevval Sam

== Finalists ==
=== Season 1 ===
- Ali Ozan Bayram (Champion)
- Yusuf Ayata
- Alican Aslan (English)
- Erman Albayrak (Elman Music)
- Hakan Akdoğan
- Bilal Göregen
- Emre Büyüktunç
- Kaya Adamlar
- Kaan Baybağ
- Ramazan Berkay Oral
- Mehmet Yenigün - Koray Polat
- Yunus Emre Çelik
- Hamdi Yumrukmanyağı

=== Season 2 ===
- Mustafa Sefa Bulut (Champion)
- Aref Ghafouri
- Oğuz Engin
- Kaan Gülsoy
- Türkan Kürşad
- Fatih Jackson
- Cüneyt Acar
- Cem Arman
- Kum Sanatı
- Tokio Tekkan
- Şavkar Jimnastik
- Gökalp Koçoğlu
- Kuzeyin Uşakları
- Sercan Yenice and Pascal

=== Season 3 ===
- Onur Balcı (Champion)
- Kafkas Kartalları
- Serdar Boğatekin and Lunatics
- Halit İncedayı
- Güney Cino
- Tuğberk and Alara
- İlker ve Seda
- Abdullah Talayhan
- Her Kafadan Bir Ses
- Pembe Panter
- Ayhan ve Anıl
- Kutay Özkan ve Tarçin
- Gökdeniz Özkan

=== Season 4 ===
- Alp Ömer Didici
- Yunus Can Eslemez
- Abidin Yurdakul
- Deniz Can Çördük
- Murtaza Miragazade
- Fire Storm
- İrem Okyay and Cash
- Grup Kaşıks
- Nahit Yılmaz
- Hacivat and Karagöz
- Family Group
- Hakan Çankaya
- Mehmet Çakır
- Uğur Harmankaya
