= Kavak Yelleri =

Turkish teen drama television series

- Created by: Timur Savcı
- Based on: Dawson's Creek by Kevin Williamson
- Directed by: Kerem Çakıroğlu
- Starring: Pelin Karahan; İbrahim Kendirci; Aslı Enver; Dağhan Külegeç; Sarp Apak; Ceren Moray
- Country of origin: Turkey
- Original language: Turkish
- No. of seasons: 5
- No. of episodes: 170

Production
- Camera setup: Single-camera
- Running time: 90 minutes
- Production companies: TIMS Productions; Sony Pictures Television International

Original release
- Network: Kanal D
- Release: 31 May 2007 – 30 August 2011

Kavak Yelleri (literally "Poplar Winds", English title: Daydreaming) is a Turkish youth drama television series produced by TIMS Productions and Sony Pictures Television International. Kavak Yelleri is a Turkish remake of the American show Dawson's Creek created by Kevin Williamson and was broadcast on Kanal D from 2007 to 2011. Soundtrack songs of Pinhani are Turkish soundtrack classics. The theme song of the series is 'Hele Bi Gel' by the band Pinhani.

== Synopsis ==
The series follows a group of friends growing up in the small town of Urla and afterwards in Istanbul. Aslı (Joey) is a doctor, Mine (Jen) is an interpreter, Efe (Pacey) has a restaurant and Deniz (Dawson) is a photographer who wants be a director. Deniz has romantic relationships with "Mine" and "Aslı".

After Efe died, Aslı's new lover is thief "Güven". After the years, Güven realizes that Efe didn't die. Although Güven loves Aslı, He makes the two ex-lovers Aslı and Efe meet. But Efe is terminally ill. Aslı gave birth Efe's son, After Efe died.

Deniz's wife "Ada" died. Mine's psychopath husband "Burak" divorced. Then, "Mine" and "Deniz" married and they have a daughter.

== Cast ==
The main characters are Aslı Zeybek (Pelin Karahan), Deniz Akça (İbrahim Kendirci), Mine Ergun (Aslı Enver) and Efe Kaygısız (Dağhan Külegeç). Su (Ceren Moray) and Güven Karakuş (Sarp Apak) were introduced in later episodes.
