= Vizontele Tuuba =

- Theatrical release Poster
- Directed by: Yılmaz Erdoğan
- Written by: Yılmaz Erdoğan
- Produced by: Necati Akpınar
- Starring: Yılmaz Erdoğan; Tarık Akan; Altan Erkekli; İclal Aydın; Demet Akbağ; Tuba Ünsal; Tolga Çevik; Ata Demirer
- Cinematography: Uğur İçbak
- Edited by: Engin Öztürk
- Music by: Kardeş Türküler
- Production company: Beşiktaş Kültür Merkezi
- Distributed by: Warner Bros. Pictures
- Release date: January 23, 2004
- Running time: 111 minutes
- Country: Turkey
- Language: Turkish

Vizontele Tuuba is a 2004 Turkish comedy-drama film, written and directed by Yılmaz Erdoğan, based on the writer-director's childhood memories of the last summer of his childhood in village in 1980. The film, which went on nationwide release on January 23, 2004, was a sequel to the highly successful Vizontele (2001).

== Production ==
The film was shot on location in Gevaş, Van Province and Ağrı Province, Turkey.

== Plot ==
Five years after the events of the first film, Crazy Emin’s village remains mostly unchanged apart from an increase in television sets and the town’s youth becoming divided into left and ring wing factions. Siti Ana continues to grieve for his son Rifat, at his “grave”, the buried television set that announced his death. Latif is now the village chairman of the Justice Party. Emin continues to be the village idiot, repairman and painter. Emin feuds with Latif when he paints a dove, an opposition party’s symbol, on a Justice Party signboard. On another occasion, the town’s leftists commission Emin to paint an acronym of their organization on a mountainside, but end up clashing with the rightists when it is vandalized.

Mayor Nazmi’s grandson, Yilmaz, returns home from Ankara for a summer vacation, and becomes the narrator. He is accompanied by Guner Sernikli, who, with his wife Aysel and their wheelchair-using daughter Tuba, has been assigned as the head librarian to the village, but Nazmi tells him there is no library. The Serniklis are welcomed by Nazmi and the other villagers while Emin becomes smitten with Tuba. Emin and Nazmi help Guner find and repair a building for the library. After a public appeal, the library opens with books donated from across the country, but the villagers make a cursory glance at its contents before leaving. Emin hatches an idea to attract visitors by setting up a television set in the library. He digs up Rifat’s grave and repairs the TV before installing it in the library, while making sure to plant a poplar tree to prevent Siti Ana from noticing. Before long, the library is filled with villagers seeking free entertainment in the evenings, while Guner helps the village illiterates to read. When Guner declares a smoking ban in the library, the town's warring youth groups unite in opposition to it. Latif, seeing the library as a threat to his influence, accuses Guner of subversion before the local jandarma commander.

One night, the TV breaks down, prompting Emin to take it home for repairs. He fixes the TV but falls asleep. The next day, he finds the library ransacked, unaware that a coup has broken out and mistakes its announcement as a war movie. Soldiers arrive and arrest most of the town’s youth and Guner for alleged subversion before moving out. Guner's family moves out and Tuba shares a sorrowful parting with Emin, while a background shows an acronym similar to Tuba’s name on the mountainside.

The story is based on the memories of writer-director Yılmaz Erdoğan of the last summer of his childhood in Hakkâri, Turkey in 1980.

== Cast ==
- Yılmaz Erdoğan as Crazy Emin
- Tarık Akan as Güner Sernikli
- Altan Erkekli as Nazmi Doğan
- İclal Aydın as Ceyhan
- Demet Akbağ as Siti Ana
- Tuba Ünsal as Tuba Sernikli
- Tolga Çevik as Nafiz
- İdil Fırat as Aysel Sernikli
