= Çok Filim Hareketler Bunlar =

- Theatrical poster
- Directed by: Ozan Açıktan
- Produced by: Yılmaz Erdoğan; Necati Akpınar
- Starring: Yılmaz Erdoğan; Eser Yenenler; Metin Yıldız
- Cinematography: Ahmet Sesigürgil
- Music by: Oğuzhan Koç; Deniz Erdoğan
- Distributed by: Medyavizyon
- Release date: March 26, 2010
- Running time: 103 minutes
- Country: Turkey
- Language: Turkish

Çok Filim Hareketler Bunlar is a 2010 Turkish comedy film, directed by Ozan Açıktan and written and performed by the BKM theater players based on the group's theatre work and television series Çok Güzel Hareketler Bunlar, which consists of an assortment of sketches illustrating comic predicaments related to the summer holidays. The film, which went on nationwide general release across Turkey on March 26, 2010, was one of the highest-grossing Turkish films of 2010.

== Plot ==
Nine separate stories intertwine into one comedy on people’s expectations and perceptions of a beautiful summer vacation: the stories of those who are only after love; of those who have to stay at home and fight mosquitoes on summer nights; of those who only go to the sea; of those who cannot appreciate the value of a bicycle - the most beautiful summer gift ever; and of those who are still away at their holiday spot even after they have returned home.

== Cast ==
- Yılmaz Erdoğan - Müdür
- Eser Yenenler
- Metin Yıldız
- Şahin Irmak - Kazım
- Büşra Pekin - Hatice
- Metin Keçeci

== Release ==
The film opened in 476 screens across Turkey on March 26, 2010 at number one in the Turkish box office chart with an opening weekend gross of $1,544,435.

== Reception ==
=== Box office ===
The movie was number one at the Turkish box office for three weeks and made a total gross of $6,322,637 in Turkey.

=== Reviews ===
Emine Yıldırım, writing in Today's Zaman, states, "The point of this film is obviously to take the TV show and the theater performance beyond its boundaries and supplement it with a couple of cinematic tricks and conventions", and "It’s all good and dandy, with an assured technical polish and upbeat direction", and also the acting is great and the sketches are wittily written by the BKM collective, which has an exceptionally perceptive taste on contemporary Turkish society with its cultural authenticities, yet one wonders if the film brings anything new to cinema except for increasing its regular viewer base. Despite all its vivacity, he concludes, "[the film] comes out early in the season since its light 'summer' sensibilities don’t exactly mix well with the dreary spring showers", and "It’s exactly the type of film that one would want to throw oneself at while enjoying the luxury of air-conditioned theaters while stuffing one’s face with popcorn. Still, it’s worth a watch to lighten up those spirits if you don’t own a TV at home."

== See also ==
- Turkish films of 2010
- 2010 in film
