= Aydinchik =

Azerbaijani musician (born 1959)

Aydinchik Aydınçik
- Born: Aydin Valiyev; 18 July 1959 (age 66); Baku, Azerbaijan
- Origin: Azerbaijani
- Genres: Chanson
- Occupations: Singer, songwriter
- Years active: 1974–present

Aydin Salman oglu Valiyev (Azerbaijani: Aydın Salman oğlu Vəliyev), better known by his stage name Aydinchik, born on July 18, 1959, is an Azerbaijani singer and songwriter. His music, mostly in the chanson genre, was at its most popular between 1970 and 1980.

== Biography ==
Valiyev was born on July 18, 1959, in Baku, Azerbaijan. His family's circumstances were modest. His elementary schooling began in 1965; he graduated from his secondary school, Music High School No. 26, in 1975. Before embarking on his performing career, he worked as an electrician (that is, a lighting technician) in a television studio and, subsequently, in the film industry. He relocated to Russia in 1977, and remained there for more than a decade.

== Discography ==
=== Songs ===
- 1977: Dolya Vorovskaya
- Bakı yurdum
- 2005: Keçmə
- 2005: Humay
- 1976: Elnarə
- 1974: Gülnarə
- 1976: Ay xanım
- Dolanım başına
- 2005: Qaz-21
- 2005: Qaçma, quzu ceyran
- 1976: Sevgilim
- Sən məni görsən tanımayacaqsan
- Sən olmasan, mən də olmaram
- Səni dovşan yesin, mən də dovşanı
- Süzginən şərab
- Zəng eyləyib məni yorma
