= Altan Erkekli =

Turkish actor (born 1955)

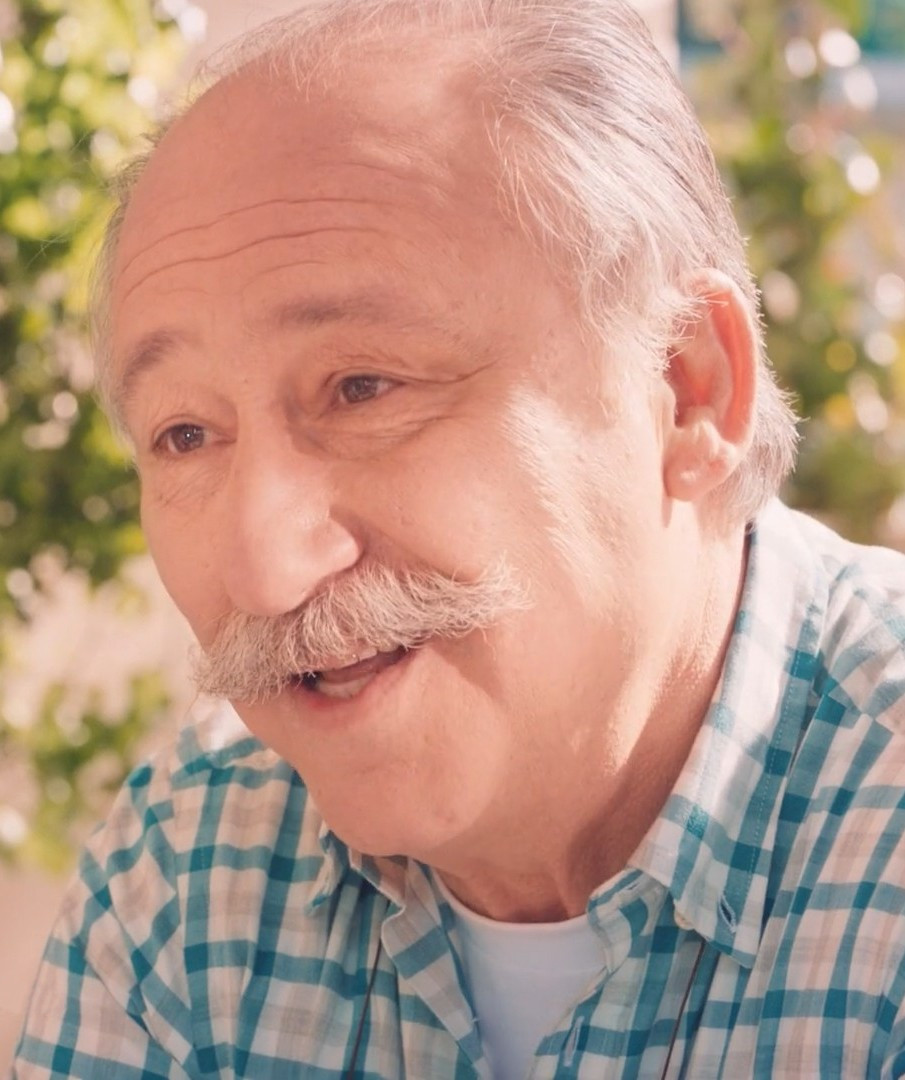
- Born: Reşit Altan Erkekli; 18 January 1955 (age 71); Istanbul, Turkey
- Occupation: Actor
- Years active: 1976–present

Reşit Altan Erkekli (born 18 January 1955) is a Turkish theatre, film and television actor.

== Filmography ==
Films:

- 1982 Dolap Beyiri
- 1989 Can Şenliği
- 1991 Deniz Gurbetçileri
- 1993 Mavi Sürgün
- 1996 80. Adım
- 2000 Merdiven
- 2001 Vizontele - (as Nazmi Doğan)
- 2004 Hızlı Adımlar - Lütfü
- 2004 Vizontele Tuuba - (as Nazmi Doğan)
- 2005 Istanbul Tales (Anlat İstanbul) - Hilmi
- 2005 Organize İşler - (as Yusuf Ziya Ocak)
- 2006 The Exam - (as Almancı Sedat)
- 2006 Eve Dönüş - (as Hoca)
- 2006 Unutulmayanlar - (as Aziz)
- 2006 Cenneti Beklerken - (as Çoban)
- 2008 O... Çocuklari
- 2009 I Saw the Sun
- 2011 Love Likes Coincidences
- 2012 Uzun Hikâye
- 2013 Umut Üzümleri
- 2014 Yağmur: Kıyamet Çiçeği
- 2017 Ayla: The Daughter of War
- 2018 Bizi Hatırla
- 2019 Çiçero
- 2019 Hababam Sınıfı Yeniden
- 2019 Enes Batur Gerçek Kahraman
- 2019 Görülmüştür
- 2020 Ağır Romantik
- 2020 Hababam Sınıfı Yaz Oyunları
- 2022 Bandırma Füze Kulübü

TV series:

- 1994 Kurtuluş (as Yakup Kadri Bey)
- 2001–2007 Bir Demet Tiyatro
- 2003 Havada Bulut
- 2003 Bir İstanbul Masalı (as Cemal Kozan)
- 2005–2007 Beyaz Gelincik (as Halil Aslanbaş)
- 2010 Yerden Yüksek (Ziya Fikret Tamyol)
- 2014 Sen Olsan Ne Yapardın
- 2015 Kara Ekmek
- 2016 Hangimiz Sevmedik
- 2017 Nerdesin Birader
- 2019 Vurgun
- 2019 Dengi Dengine
- 2019–2020 Afili Aşk
- 2020 Ya İstiklal Ya Ölüm
- 2021 Payitaht Abdülhamid
- 2021 Yeşilçam
- 2021 Baht Oyunu
- 2022 Bir Küçük Gün Işığı
- 2024 Senden Önce

Awards
Preceded by Talat Bulut	Golden Orange Award for Best Actor; 2001 for Vizontele	Succeeded by Fırat Tanış
