= Tunçboyacıyan =

Tunçboyacıyan is a surname. Notable people with the surname include:

- Arto Tunçboyacıyan (Armenian: Արտո Թունչբոյաջյան) (born 1957), Armenian musician
- Ohannes Tunçboyacı (Onno Tunç) (Armenian: Օհաննես Թունչբոյաջյան) (1948–1996), Turkish musician
