= Vizontele =

2001 film

- Theatrical Release Poster
- Directed by: Yılmaz Erdoğan; Ömer Faruk Sorak
- Written by: Yılmaz Erdoğan
- Produced by: Baran Bolat
- Starring: Yılmaz Erdoğan; Demet Akbağ; Altan Erkekli; Cem Yılmaz
- Cinematography: Ömer Faruk Sorak
- Edited by: Mustafa Preşeva
- Music by: Kardeş Türküler
- Production companies: Beşiktaş Kültür Merkezi; Bocek Yapim
- Distributed by: Warner Bros. Pictures
- Release date: 2 February 2001 (Turkey)
- Running time: 110 mins
- Country: Turkey
- Language: Turkish

Vizontele is a 2001 Turkish comedy-drama film, written and directed by Yılmaz Erdoğan and co-directed by Ömer Faruk Sorak, based on the writer-director's childhood memories of the arrival of the first television to his village in the early 1970s. The film, which went on nationwide release on February 2, 2001, won three Golden Orange awards and was one of the most successful Turkish films to that date. A sequel, entitled Vizontele Tuuba, involving the director and most of the original cast followed in 2004.

== Production ==
The film was shot on location in Gevaş, Van Province, Turkey.

== Plot ==
Nazmi, the mayor of a small village in Southeastern Turkey in 1974 bitterly opposes the activities of sleazy opportunist Latif, who runs the only cinema in the village, which shows the same film over and over again. Nazmi seeks to break his monopoly over village entertainment with the introduction of the first television (called Vizontele by the locals). However, the TRT team sent to deliver the television leave in a hurry after the delivery, leaving the villagers clueless as to how to set it up.

Nazmi recruits some of his staff and the village’s eccentric repairman, Emin, to help him to set up a television transmitter. In the process, Nazmi learns more about Emin’s life, including his romance with a Danish hippie and his struggles to get a radio signal at his mother’s grave so that he could play her favorite songs. While Latif seeks to undermine his efforts by convincing the local imam to decry television as the work of the Devil and a slap in the face of Islamic tradition, Nazmi and Emin's team are ridiculed with their initial failures to get a signal until they get it atop the highest peak in town. However, they are disheartened when the television only receives channels from neighboring Iran.

As they return, one of their companions hits the TV set in frustration, inadvertently switching the channels to Turkish and prompting celebrations. However, their joy is short-lived as the first news broadcast they watch is about the death of Nazmi's son, Rifat, in the Turkish invasion of Cyprus. Nazmi's wife, Siti Ana, who has been wary of the television, orders Emin to bury the TV set in place of their son. Meanwhile, Emin celebrates after he succeeds in getting a radio signal at his mother’s grave.

The story is based on the childhood memories of the writer-director Yılmaz Erdoğan of the arrival of the first television to Hakkâri in the early 1970s.

== Societal conflicts ==
The movie tries to represent one of the main conflicts in the Turkish society of the late 1970s, continuing well into the 1980s; that of the religious versus secular groups. "[T]here have always been struggles and contests between secular groups and religious groups over the nature of the political system." This is partly shown through the image of the clergyman of the town, who stutters a lot, and apparently feels vitriolic toward the new-coming television, but later on turns out to be a pawn at the hands of Latif. Children escape his Quran reading class in order to go into the wild and frolic. An obvious point the movie makes in favor of secular ideas is the character of [crazy] Emin (played by one of the directors: Yılmaz Erdoğan). He is pictured as someone who is secluded and one whose only interest is modern technology. But the movie makers are clever enough not to take sides with either side of the conflict. As put eloquently by Başkan, "According to secularization theory, modernization leads to a decline in religion's role in the public realm, with it turning into a matter for the private sphere. Instead, however, the contemporary world has witnessed a resurgence of religion with the emergence of religious movements throughout the world." The first piece of news that the inhabitants get to hear on the new television - that the Mayor's son, who was serving in the Army, was killed during the Turkish invasion of Cyprus in 1974 - is so devastating that a burial of the TV set is in order; an iconic replacement of the burial of the beloved son. And the man who has to bury the TV set is no other than the technocrat of the town, on allegations that it has brought evil to the small community of the religious people.

== Cast ==
- Yılmaz Erdoğan as Deli Emin
- Demet Akbağ as Siti Ana
- Altan Erkekli as Mayor Nazmi
- Cem Yılmaz as Fikri
- Cezmi Baskın as latif
- Bican Günalan as Sezgin
- Sebnem Sönmez as Gulizar
- Iclal Aydin as Reyhan
- Mesut Çakarli as Rifat
- Zeynep Tokuş as Asiye
- Tolga Çevik as Nazif
- Tuncer Salman as Ahmet
- Salih Kalyon as Casim
- Sener Kökkaya as Basri
- Erdal Tosun as Sehymus
- Şafak Sezer as Veli
- Adem Atbas as Fatih
- Serhat Özcan as Engin
- Caner Alkaya as Iso
- Can Kahraman as Ezo

== Awards ==
- Cologne Mediterranean Film Festival (2001)
  - Audience Award (won)
- Antalya Golden Orange Film Festival (2001)
  - Golden Orange for Best Actor: Altan Erkekli (won)
  - Golden Orange for Best Actress: Demet Akbağ (tied with Yesim Salkim for Sarkici)
  - Golden Orange for Best Music: Kardeş Türküler (won)

== See also ==
- Television (2012 film)
