= Eva Gronbach =

German fashion designer (born 1971)

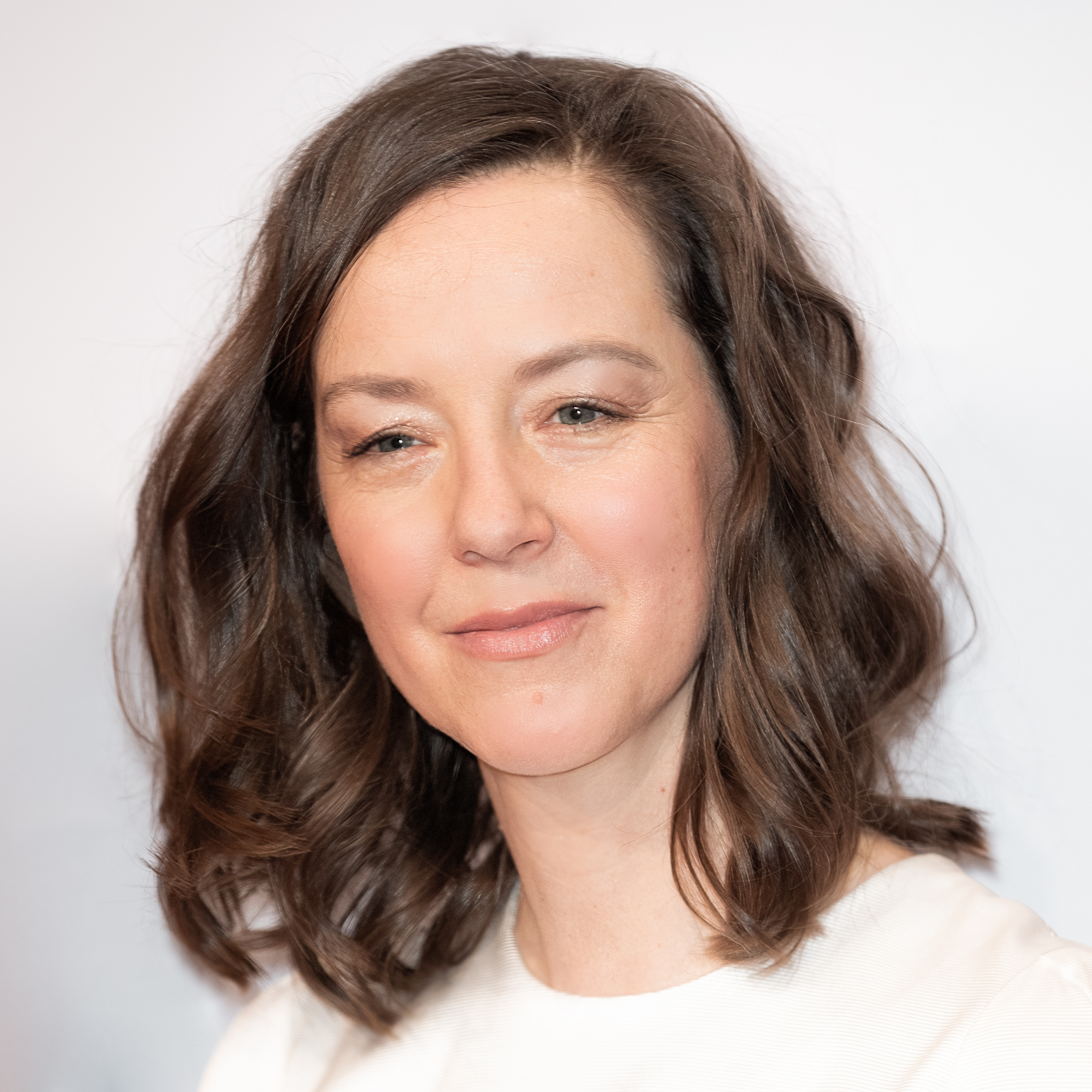
Eva Gronach, 2019

Eva Gronbach (born 1971, in Cologne, West Germany) is a German fashion designer.

== Literature ==
- Patricia Brattig (Hrsg.): Ausstellungskatalog, In: femme fashion 1780–2004: die Modellierung des Weiblichen in der Mode, Arnoldsche Verlagsanstalt, Stuttgart 2003, ISBN 3-89790-215-X
- Eva Gronbach und Susanne Anna: Generation Mode (the Fashion Generation), Hatje Cantz Verlag, Ostfildern 2005, ISBN 3-7757-1614-9
