= Pelin Karahan =

Turkish actress (born 1984)

- Born: Vildan Pelin Karahan; 6 October 1984 (age 41); Ankara, Turkey
- Education: Anadolu University
- Occupations: Actress; TV host
- Years active: 2007–present
- Notable work: Muhteşem Yüzyıl as Mihrimah Sultan
- Spouses: Erdinç Bekiroğlu (m. 2011; div. 2013) Bedri Güntay (m. 2014; div. 2026)
- Children: 2

Vildan Pelin Karahan (born 6 October 1984) is a Turkish actress and TV host, best known for her portrayal of Mihrimah Sultan, Sultan Süleyman's only daughter in Muhteşem Yüzyıl and in Kavak Yelleri (Turkish remake of Dawson's Creek).

== Early life ==
Karahan was born in Ankara, Turkey, to Bayram Ali Karahan of Libyan descent and Nural Koçyiğit. Her maternal grandmother is an Albanian immigrant.

Karahan attended Arı College Elementary School, and completed middle school partly at Ankara Gaziosmanpaşa Primary School, partly at Ödemiş Primary School. She graduated from the Lyceum of Sokollu Mehmet Paşa and then from the School of Tourism Enterprises at Anadolu University.

== Career ==
At the start of her career, Karahan featured in Coca-Cola Light and Carrefour advertisements.

=== TV series ===
She played the role of Aslı Zeybek in the teen drama television series, Kavak Yelleri (Turkish remake of Dawson's Creek), broadcast on Turkish TV channel Kanal D from 2007 to 2011.

In 2012, she was signed up to appear in the popular TV series Muhteşem Yüzyıl ("Magnificent Century"), as Mihrimah Sultan which is about the life of Sultan Suleiman the Magnificent. In 2021, she played in the historical series Bir Zamanlar Kıbrıs about Turks in Cyprus.

=== Web series ===
She played in the crime series Şebeke alongside Furkan Palalı and Ceyda Ateş.

=== Film ===
She played in the film Dalgalar ve İzler. She also appeared in the comedy crime film Güven Bana.

=== Theatre ===
She also performed in the play Şaşırt Beni, which is written by Selçuk Aydemir. She performed in the musical theatre Broadway'den İstanbul'a Müzikaller.

=== TV host ===
She served as the host of Bir Evde animal program and Nefis Tarifler cooking programming.

== Personal life ==
Pelin was married to fitness instructor Erdinç Bekiroğlu from 2011 until 2013. On 24 June 2014, she married Bedri Güntay. She gave birth to their sons in December 2014 and March 2017, respectively. The couple divorced in April 2026.

== Filmography ==
Film
Title	Year	Role	Note
2021	Dalgalar ve İzler	Suna	
2023	Güven Bana	Zeynep	
2025	Tete ve Masal: Rüyalar Diyarı	Princess Prinyezel	
Web series
Title	Year	Role	Note
2023	Şebeke	Tuğba	
2025	Geleceğe Mektuplar	Pelin	Guest appearance
2026	Düşes	Yurdagül Şaşmaz	
TV series
Title	Year	Role	Note
2007–2011	Kavak Yelleri	Aslı Zeybek	
2012	Mavi Kelebekler	Adult	Guest
2012–2014	Muhteşem Yüzyıl	Mihrimah Sultan	
2015–2016	Yeter	Aylin Harmanlı	
2018	Yuvamdaki Düşman	Tülin	Guest
2021–2022	Bir Zamanlar Kıbrıs	İnci Dereli	
2024	Bahar	Sevda	Guest appearance
2024	Kirli Sepeti	Meyra Karabey	Supporting role
2026	Tuzlu Kahve	Aslı Zeybek	Guest appearance
Theatre
Title	Year	Role	Note
2018	Güldür Güldür Show		Guest
2022	Broadway'den İstanbul'a Müzikaller		
2022	Şaşırt Beni		
Programming
Title	Year	Role	Note
2012	Bir Evde		
2017	Pelin Karahan ile Nefis Tarifler		
2022	Pelin'in Mutfağı		

== Awards ==
Year	Award	Category	Title	Result
2011	Media and Arts Awards	Most Successful Television Series Actress	Kavak Yelleri	Won
2015	6th Beirut International Awards Festival	Best International Actress		Won
