= Turn of Duty 24/7 =

Turkish military serial in the Turkish language

- Season 7

Release
- Original network: Show TV
- Original release: 3 March 2019

Turn of Duty 24/7 or Guards of Homeland 24/7 (Turkish Nöbet or Watchers) is a Turkish and Arabic language serial set within the Turkish military.

== Summary ==
Turn of Duty 24/7 (Turkish Nöbet or Watchers) is a Turkish and Arabic language serial set within the Turkish military and based on the Valley of the Wolves franchise and produced by Pana Film. It is scheduled to be aired on Show TV in Turkey beginning in mid-October 2019. The Turkish newspaper Akşam has quoted the Turkish actor Necati Şaşmaz, who played the lead in Valley of the Wolves, as saying that he will also lead in Turn of Duty 24/7.

Turn of Duty 24/7 is based in Istanbul, Turkey, and is intended to be a self-contained series, capable of being viewed independently of Valley of the Wolves.
