= Ayna (band) =

Turkish rock band

- Origin: Turkey
- Genres: Hard rock (only in the first album); Rock; Folk rock Alternative rock Pop rock Soft rock
- Years active: 1996–present
- Labels: Erol Köse Production (1997–2002); Rüzgar Production (2003–present)
- Members: Erhan Güleryüz; Kaya Sevinç; Orçun Çolak; Umut Çılgın; Arda Algan
- Past members: Cemil Özeren; Can Güney; Alper Çakır; Ayhan Öztoplu; Murathan Araz; Soner Doğanca; Türker Otçu; Ferda Orçun Aca; Deniz Beydili

Ayna is a Turkish rock band formed in 1996 by Erhan Güleryüz and Cemil Özeren. AYNA consists of Erhan Güleryüz (vocal), Kaya Sevinç (guitar), Can Ergenler (bass), Bülent Akbay (drums) and Orçun Çolak (keyboard). The group broadcast a music program named Ayna'dan Yansıyanlar on TRT.

With their latest concert, they've reached a record number of 2,500,000 visitors. Besides being an album band, Ayna promotes themselves as a concert band. Meanwhile, Ayna have worked with more than twenty musicians, for which they have had only one condition, which is to maintain their great friendships in their private lives.

== Awards ==
- Kral TV Video Music Awards, 1997, 1999, 2000, 2001 "Video Music Awards Best Group".
- The only band in the Guinness World Records for giving more than 2000 concerts both in Turkey and worldwide.
- The only group with sales of more than 1 million albums in Turkey.
- To this date, AYNA has produced eight different albums regarding a total sale of more than 10 million.

== Discography ==
=== Albums ===
- Gittiğin Yağmurla Gel (1997)
- Dön Bak Ayna'ya (1998)
- Şarkılar - Türküler (1999)
- Çayımın Şekeri (2000)
- Bostancı Durağı (2002)
- Denizden Geliyoruz (2004)
- Nefes (2006)
- Asmalımescit (2010)
- Mavi Şarkılar (2011)
- 20.1 (2017)
- Yine Aşk (2023)

=== Singles ===
- Sevmek (2015)
- Severek Ayrılanlar / 20th Year Special (2017)
- Mimoza (2018)
- Sultan (2019)
- İstanbul (2020)
- Salacak Sahili (2023)

=== EP's ===
- Öpsem Geçer mi? (2020)

== Members ==
- Erhan Güleryüz - Lead Vocal (1996–present)
- Orçun Colak - Keyboard(1998–present)
- Kaya Sevinç - Guitar (2021–present)
- Arda Algan - Bass Guitar (2023–present)
- Umut Çılgın - Drum (2023–present)

== Past members ==
- Cemil Özeren - Vocal (1996–2002)
- Can Güney - Guitar (1996–1999 / 2004–2019)
- Murathan Araz - Bass Guitar (1997–2002)
- Ayhan Öztoplu - Drum (1996–1998)
- Alper Çakır - Keyboard (1996–1998)
- Soner Doğanca - Drum (1998–1999)
- Türker Otçu - Guitar (2000–2002)
- Deniz Beydili - Bass Guitar (2003–2005)
- Ferda Orçun Aca - Drum (2003–2007)
- Genco Kulaksız - Guitar (2019–2021)
- Can Ergenler - Bass Guitar (2005-2023)
- Bülent Akbay - Drum (1999-2003 / 2009-2023)
