= Özgü =

- Gender: unisex

Origin
- Language: Turkish
- Meaning: "characteristic" and/or "holly"

Other names
- Related names: Özgür, Özge, Özgen

Özgü is a common Turkish given name. In Turkish, "Özgü" means "holly". But it also means "characteristic".

== Real People ==
- Özgü Namal, a Turkish actress.
- Özgü Uzun, a Turkish football player at Southern Stars Football Club
- Gökçe Özgü, a Turkish rugby player at Turkey national rugby union team
