= Çok Güzel Hareketler 2 =

Turkish TV program

Çok Güzel Hareketler 2 (in English: Very Beautiful Movements 2 or Nice Moves 2) is a Turkish comedy program directed by Yılmaz Erdoğan. It is the sequel to Çok Güzel Hareketler Bunlar.

On the show, the players perform and write sketches that are graded by Erdoğan and the audience. In 2017, it premiered in BKM Theatre and continues in Europe and Turkey. In 2019, the first episode was released on Kanal D. Since 2022, it continues to be released on Star TV.

Also, an education series, titled "Yılmaz Erdoğan ile Öğrence" was released on TRT 2 which is a state arts channel. It is about script, cinema, and stage.

== Cast ==
- Arif Güloğlu
- Atakan Çelik
- Ayşegül Yılmaz
- Batuhan Soyaslan
- Cenan Adıgüzel
- Cemile Canyurt
- Ebru Yücel
- Emin Oğuz Çelebi
- Emre Aslan
- Evliya Aykan
- Ezgi Özyürekoğlu
- Fatma Tezcan
- Hacı Ahmet Ak
- Metin Pıhlıs
- Ömer Faruk Çavuş
- Safa Sarı
- Selen Esen Çelebi
- Tuğba Yılmaz
- Hilmi Deler
- Yeşim Dursun

== Series overview ==
The table below provides general information about the topic:

| Season | Timeslot | Season premiere | Season finale | No. of episodes | Section range | Season's years | TV Channel |
| 1. Season | Sunday 20:00 | February 10, 2019 | June 13, 2019 | 18 | 1-18 | 2019 | Kanal D |
| 2. Season | Sunday 20:00 | September 8, 2019 | June 28, 2020 | 17 | 19-52 | 2019-2020 | Kanal D |
| 3. Season | Sunday 20:00 | September 13, 2020 | June 13, 2021 | 37 | 53-89 | 2020-2021 | Kanal D |
| 4. Season | Monday 20:00 / Sunday 20.00 | September 13, 2021 | May 29, 2022 | 19 | 90-109 / 110-120 | 2021-2022 | Kanal D / Star TV |
| 5. Season | Sunday 20.00 | October 2, 2022 | June 18, 2023 | 28 | 121-148 | 2022-2023 | Star TV |
| 6. Season | Sunday 20.00 | October 1, 2023 | June 9, 2024 | 29 | 149-177 | 2023-2024 | Star TV |
| 7. Season | Sunday 20.00 | October 13, 2024 | June 1, 2025 | 28 | 178-205 | 2024-2025 | Star TV |
| 8. Season | Thursday 20.00 / Sunday 20.00 / Monday 20.00 | October 30, 2025 | May 18, 2026 | 15 | 206-220 | 2025-2026 | Star TV |
| 9. Season | Thursday 19.00 | October 22, 2026 | - | 1 | 221- | 2026- | YouTube |
