= Magic Carpet Ride (film) =

- Theatrical Poster
- Directed by: Yılmaz Erdoğan
- Written by: Yılmaz Erdoğan
- Produced by: Necati Akpınar
- Starring: Yılmaz Erdoğan; Tolga Cevik; Demet Akbağ; Altan Erkekli; Özgü Namal; Erdal Tosun; Cem Yılmaz
- Cinematography: Uğur İçbak
- Edited by: Mustafa Presheva
- Music by: Ozan Çolakoğlu
- Production company: Beşiktaş Kültür Merkezi
- Release date: 23 December 2005
- Running time: 114 minutes
- Country: Turkey
- Language: Turkish

Magic Carpet Ride (A.K.A.: Organized Jobs; Turkish: Organize İşler) is a 2005 Turkish comedy film, written and directed by Yılmaz Erdoğan, about a small-time criminal who accidentally recruits a failed comedy Superman impersonator into his gang. The film, which went on nationwide release on 23 December 2005, is the first Turkish production to be shot in 1:2, 35mm CinemaScope format. The second film, Organize İşler: Sazan Sarmalı, released in 2019.

== Production ==
The film was shot on location in Istanbul, Turkey.

== Plot ==
Asim Noyan (Yılmaz Erdoğan) and his gang make up a rambling collective, which concerns itself with a range of criminal activities, running from car theft to fraud. An inveterate womaniser, Asim meets the failed comedian Superman impersonator Samet (Tolga Cevik) while fleeing from an angry husband. Desperate Samet finds himself unwittingly implicated in the life of the gang. Meanwhile, Umut (Özgü Namal), the daughter of Mr and Mrs Ocak, a highly literate but hard-up couple, leads an altogether different life. The paths of Samet, Umut and Asim's gang cross because of a stolen car.

== See also ==
- 2005 in film
