= Eyyvah Eyvah =

2010 Turkish comedy film

- Film poster
- Directed by: Hakan Algül
- Written by: Ata Demirer
- Produced by: Necati Akpinar
- Starring: Ata Demirer; Demet Akbag
- Production company: Besiktas Kültür Merkezi
- Distributed by: United International Pictures
- Release date: 26 February 2010
- Country: Turkey
- Language: Turkish
- Box office: $12,011,619

Eyyvah Eyvah is a 2010 Turkish comedy film, directed by Hakan Algül, which stars Ata Demirer as a young clarinet player who travels to Istanbul in search of his estranged father. The film, which went on nationwide general release across Turkey on February 26, 2010, is one of the highest-grossing Turkish films of 2010 and was followed by the sequel Eyyvah Eyvah 2 (2011).

== Production ==
The film was shot on location in Istanbul and Çanakkale, Turkey.

== Plot ==
Hüseyin (Ata Demirer) is a young man living with his grandparents in a village in Turkey's Thracian region. Two things are of great importance in Hüseyin's life: his clarinet and the village nurse Müjgan, who he is in love with. However, one day Hüseyin is forced to go to İstanbul in search of his long-lost father and leave behind his beloved village. In the big city, Hüseyin will receive the biggest support from his clarinet and later from a bar singer called Firuzan (Demet Akbağ). Firuzan, who storms İstanbul's night clubs with her songs, already leads a very colorful and highly complicated life, which, with Hüseyin's inclusion, gets all the more colorful with comedy and action.

== Release ==
The film opened across Germany on February 25, 2010, and across Turkey and Austria a day later at number one in the Turkish box office chart with an opening weekend gross of $1,597,709.

Opening weekend gross
Date	Territory	Screens	Rank	Gross
February 26, 2010	Turkey	350	1	$1,597,709
February 25, 2010	Germany	-	-	-
February 26, 2010	Austria	6	18	$30,622

== Reception ==
=== Box office ===
The film was number one at the Turkish box office for four weeks running and has made a total gross of $12,011,619.
