= Çok Güzel Hareketler Bunlar =

Turkish comedy television series

Çok Güzel Hareketler Bunlar (literally "These Are Very Beautiful Movements"; also translated "Nice Moves" in the American vernacular) is a theatrical comedy, which was awarded at the 36th Golden Butterfly Best Comedy Award. It premiered on 14 February 2006 on BKM Theatre and continued until the end of 2012 in Europe and Turkey. The first episode was released on 7 May 2008 on Kanal D and continued to release until 26 June 2011. A New Year special episode was released on Star TV in December 2011.

Under Yılmaz Erdoğan's management, BKM Mutfak actors took the stage and wrote the sketches. All cast members served as both screenwriters and actors. They also let the audience to rate the sketch.

In 2010, the movie titled Çok Filim Hareketler Bunlar, which was written and played by BKM actors was released. BKM actors also played numerous commercials for Vodafone, Nescafé, Teknosa, Sony, Peyman, Lipton.

Also, an education series, titled "Yılmaz Erdoğan ile Öğrence" was released on TRT 2 which is a state arts channel. It is about script, cinema, and stage.

In 2017, a sequel premiered under the title Çok Güzel Hareketler 2.

BKM later made different theatrical comedies with different teams of actors in Arkadaşım Hoşgeldin, Bir Demet Tiyatro, Güldür Güldür Show and Güldür Güldür Show Çocuk. Yılmaz Erdoğan's brother Deniz Erdoğan wrote lyrics for a very familiar American folk song "Camptown Races" and that production became the generic music of the program.

== Topic ==
The actors play the sketches that they have written and at the end of the episode, Yılmaz Erdoğan comes out and wants from the spectators to evaluate the performances of the actors and the spectators grade them. They grade the players with Very Good Movement (Çok Güzel Hareket-THE BEST), Good Movement (Güzel Hareket), Bell (Zil) and Awful (Rezil).

== Series overview ==
Season	Timeslot	Season premiere	Season finale	No. of episodes	Section range	Season's years	TV Channel
1. Season	Wednesday 20:00	May 28, 2008	July 9, 2008	8	1-8	2008	Kanal D
2. Season	Wednesday / Sunday 20:00	October 8, 2008	June 21, 2009	29	9-37	2008-2009	Kanal D
3. Season	Sunday 20:00	October 11, 2009	June 20, 2010	29	38-66	2009-2010	Kanal D
4. Season	Sunday 20:00	October 17, 2010	June 26, 2011 (final)	24	67-89	2010-2011	Kanal D

== Cast and crew ==
=== Cast ===
- Ayça Erturan
- Aydan Taş
- Ayşegül Akdemir
- Burcu Gönder
- Bülent Emrah Parlak
- Büşra Pekin
- Emre Canpolat
- Ersin Korkut
- Eser Yenenler
- Gizem Tuğral
- Gülhan Tekin
- Gülsüm Alkan
- Hamdi Kahraman
- İbrahim Büyükak
- Metin Keçeci
- Metin Yıldız
- Murat Eken
- Nazmı Kahraman
- Neşe Sayles
- Oğuzhan Koç
- Pelin Öztekin
- Şahin Irmak
- Şevket Süha Tezel
- Zeynep Koçak

=== Training Staff ===
- Yılmaz Erdoğan
- Demet Akbağ
- Tolga Çevik
- Zerrin Sümer
- Altan Erkekli
- Bahtiyar Engin
- Sinan Bengier
