= Tolga Çevik =

Turkish actor and comedian

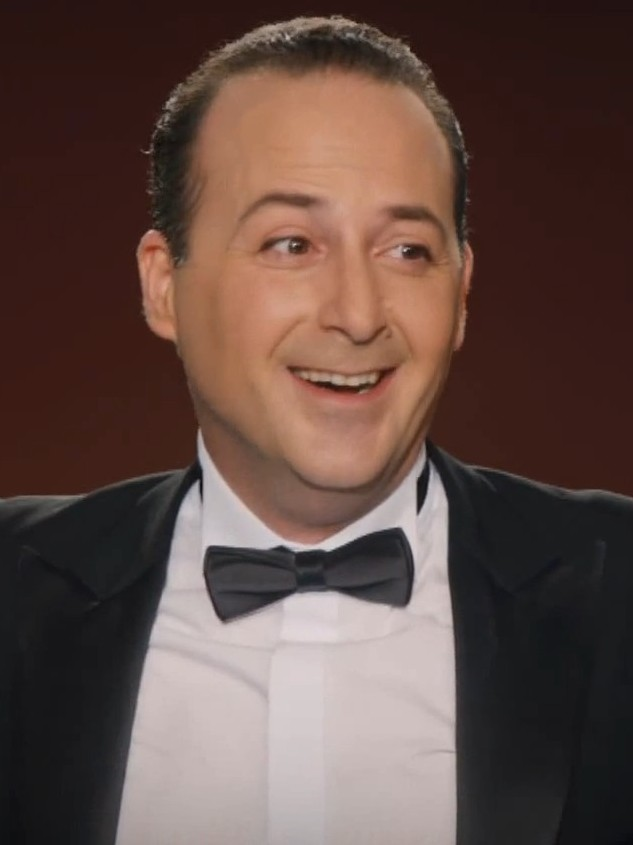
- Born: 12 May 1974 (age 52); Istanbul, Turkey
- Occupations: Actor, comedian
- Years active: 1996–present
- Spouse: Özge Yılmaz (m. 2004)
- Children: 2
- Relatives: Cem Yılmaz (brother-in-law)
- Website: http://www.tolgacevik.com/

Tolga Çevik (born 12 May 1974) is a Turkish actor, most known from the hit films "Organize İşler", Vizontele and the hit series Avrupa Yakası, improvisation theatre "Tolgshow".

== Life and career ==
He graduated from the theatre department of Central Missouri State University. He was a student of Robin Williams and Tommy Lee Jones.

== Personal life ==
He is married to Özge Yılmaz, sister of comedian Cem Yılmaz. Actor Sarp Bozkurt is his cousin, with whom he performed together in some seasons of improvisation theatre Tolgshow.

He has a daughter and a son.

== Theatre work ==
- Bana Bir Şeyhler Oluyor
- Sen Beni Sevmiyorsun ! - Edi
- Kalbin Sesi - Bob
- Kelebekler Özgürdür
- Kelebekler Özgürdür - Can
- Küheylan - Alan Strang

== Filmography ==
=== Film ===
- 2000 - Herkes Kendi Evinde - Selim
- 2000 - Vizontele - Nafiz
- 2003 - Vizontele Tuuba - Nafiz
- 2004 - Hızlı Adımlar
- 2004 - Sevinçli Haller
- 2005 - Organize İşler - Süpermen Samet
- 2012 - Sen Kimsin? - Tekin Yüksek
- 2013 - Patron Mutlu Son İstiyor
- 2016 - Sen Benim HerȘeymsin

=== TV series ===
- 1996 - Feride - Ali
- 1998 - Salacak Öyküleri
- 2002 - Aşk ve Gurur - Savaş Timur
- 2003 - Esir Şehrin İnsanları
- 2003 - Ölümsüz Aşk - Tahsin
- 2004 - Kuş Dışı - İskender
- 2006-2008 - Avrupa Yakası - Sacit Kıral
- 2004 - Herşey Yolunda - Başar

== Improvisation Theatre ==
- 2007 - Komedi Dükkanı
- 2014 - Arkadaşım Hoşgeldin
- 2016 - Müdür N'aptin
- 2017–2018 - Tolgshow
- 2021– - Tolgshow Filtresiz

== Awards ==
- Secrets - Best supporting actor Award (New York)
- I Am In America - Best Film, Best actor Award (Acedemycal (Fransa), National Film Fair Of B.F.A, California S.U)
- Marriage - CMSU Best Film ve Talent Award
- Terra Nova - Best Supporting Actor Award
- Hey God - Best actor Award
- Help Me! - Best actor Award
- Help Me! - Best B.F.A Story Award
- Jacques & The Master - Best actor Award
- Küheylan - Avni Dilligil Special Award (1996-1997)
- Küheylan - Stern Magazine Young Talent Award
- Küheylan - Vasfi Rıza Zobu Youth Award
- Vizontele - Çağdaş Cinema Actors Association Special Award (2000-2001)
- Herkes Kendi Evinde - Çağdaş Cinema Actors Association Special Award (2000-2001)
- Organize İşler - Sadri Alışık Best actor Award (2005)
- Golden Butterfly Awards)) - Best Comedian (2011)
- Golden Butterfly Awards - Best Show Program - Komedi Dükkanı (2008)
- Media Oscars - Best Comedian (2007-2008)
- Media Oscars - Best Show Program - Komedi Dükkanı (2008-2009)
- Samsun University I.OMÜ awards Best Talk Show - Komedi Dükkanı (2010-2011)
- Marmara University Math Club Awards - Best Comedian Award (2010-2011)
- 2nd Antalya Television Awards - Best Comedy Program Komedi Dükkanı (2011)
- Golden Butterfly Awards - Best Comedian Actor Award 2011
- Kadir Has University - Best Comedian Actor Award 2011
- Kahramanmaraş Sütçü İmam University 1. Yılın Kahramanları - Best Hero Comedian Award 2011
- Yıldız Technical University Yılın Yıldızları - Best Theatre Actor Award - 2012
