= Demet Akbağ =

Turkish actress (born 1959)

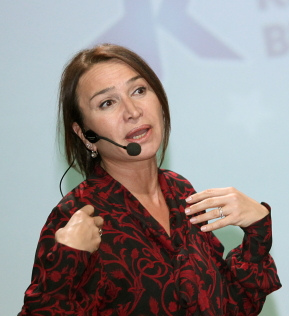
- Akbağ in March 2012
- Born: Demet İybar; 23 December 1959 (age 66); Denizli, Turkey
- Occupation: Actress
- Years active: 1983–present
- Spouses: İskender Akbağ (m. 1981; div. 1984) Saim Arpat (m. 1986; div. 1986) Zafer Çika (m. 1999; died 2019)
- Children: 1

Demet Akbağ (née İybar; born 23 December 1959) is a Turkish theatre, film actress and acting trainer.

== Biography ==
Demet Akbağ was born on 23 December 1959 in Denizli as the third child of Benan and Oktay İybar. Her family was in Denizli at the time because of the duty of her grandfather as the head of justice department in the city. Her father was a journalist and photographer. She has two elder siblings, Sedef and Kemal. As her parents separated when she was 13, she and her mother and grandmother moved to Istanbul in 1972.

She later enrolled in the Istanbul Girls High School, and as her parents got separated she started attending the Erenköy Girls High School and finished her education there. After finishing high school in 1982, she entered Istanbul Municipal Conservatory and completed her studies in four years. Her first marriage, when she was 21, lasted four years.

== Career ==
She started her professional career first in theatre in the early 1980s and then in television from 1987 onwards. That same year, she was chosen as the TV Star of The Year by Turkey's Association of Magazine Reporters.

Between 1995-2007, she played many roles in programming "Bir Demet Tiyatro". Also, she joined cast of hit series "Perihan Abla", "Elveda Rumeli".

Akbağ has been awarded with numerous prizes, including the Golden and Sadri Alışık Best Character Actor for her role in franchise film Vizontele, the Afife Jale Best Female Actor for Sen Hiç Ateşböceği Gördün mü?, the Golden Butterfly for Tersine Dünya in 1993, the Ismail Dumbullu (the first actress to get this prize after Suna Pekuysal) in 1995, the Golden Butterfly – Best Comedy Star of The Year in 1996, 1997 and 1998, and the MGD-Comedy Artist Award in both 1996 and 1997. She has also worked with the BKM Actors since their career starts and performed various leading roles in television including Bir Demet Tiyatro and Ölümsüz Aşk, in theatrical plays including Otogargara, Sen Hiç Ateşböceği Gördün mü?, and Bana Bir Şeyler Oluyor, as well as in movies including Neredesin Firuze, franchise film series Eyyvah Eyvah and Hükümet Kadın. She played in "Kış Uykusu" which won Cannes Award, with Haluk Bilginer for many times.

== Filmography ==
Film
Year	Title	Role	Notes
1986	Davacı	Dursun's wife	
1987	Homoti	Zeynep Erez	
1993	Tersine Dünya	Bitirim Leyla	
2000	Vizontele	Sıti Ana	
2004	Neredesin Firuze	Firuze	
2003	Vizontele Tuuba	Sıti Ana	
2005	Organize İşler	Nuran Ocak	
2005	The Net 2.0	Dr. Kavak	
2008	O... Çocukları	Mehtap Anne	
2010	Eyyvah Eyvah	Firuzan	
2011	Eyyvah Eyvah 2	Firuzan	
2011	Kurtuluş Son Durak	Vartanuş	
2012	Hükümet Kadın	Xate	
2013	Hükümet Kadın 2	Xate	
2014	Eyyvah Eyvah 3	Firuzan	
2014	Kış Uykusu	Necla	
2015	Niyazi Gül Dörtnala	Sultan Şahmerdan	
2015	Nadide Hayat	Nadide	
2016	Görümce	Falcı Feriştah	
2018	Görevimiz Tatil	Türkan Mutlu	
2020	9 Kere Leyla	Leyla	
TV series
Year	Title	Role	Notes
1986	Perihan Abla	Nesrin	
1991	Varsayalım İsmail	Zarife	
2003	Ölümsüz Aşk	Suna	
2004	Sevinçli Haller	Evinç	
2007–2008	Elveda Rumeli	Hüsniye	
2008–2011	Sen Harikasın	Harika	
2011	İstanbul'un Altınları	İsmet Azmarazlı	
2013	Fırıldak Ailesi	Yıldız Fırıldak	animation
2013	Sevdaluk	Adalet	
2020	Menajerimi Ara	Herself	Star TV
2020–2021	Akrep	Perihan Emgen	Star TV
2023–2025	Sandık Kokusu	Filiz Başkaya	Show TV
Programming
Year	Title	Role	Notes
1995	Bir Demet Tiyatro	Lütfiye Çıtır Fıdıllıoğlu, Züleyha, Feriştah	
1995	Bir Demet Kahkaha	Demet	
2000	Bir Demet Yerli Film	Herself	
2001	Şen Kahkahalar		
2006	Bir Demet Tiyatro	Lütfiye Çıtır, Feriştah, Orkide, Züleyha	
2016–2018	Demet Akbağ ile Çok Aramızda	Presenter	Show TV
2019	Çok Güzel Hareketler 2	Lütfiye Çıtır / Feriştah (guest)	Kanal D

Awards
Preceded by Serap Aksoy	Golden Orange Award for Best Supporting Actress; 1993 for Tersine Dünya	Succeeded by Derya Alabora
Preceded by Sanem Çelik	Golden Orange Award for Best Actress; 2001 for Vizontele shared with Yeşim Salkım for Şarkıcı	Succeeded by Meral Oğuz
