= Gürler =

Gürler (IPA: [ɡyɾˈlæɾ], literally "he/she/it roars"; third person singular present simple of the Turkish verb gürlemek with the meaning "roar, thunder, boom, growl, rumble") is a Turkish surname and may refer to:

- Faruk Gürler (1913–1975), Turkish general
- Özge Gürler (born 1985), Turkish female sprinter
- Serdar Gürler (born 1991), Turkish football player
- Şenay Gürler (born 1966), Turkish actress
