= Serkan Rutkay Ayıköz =

- Born: September 14, 1991 (age 35); Denizli, Turkey
- Education: Mimar Sinan Fine Arts University State Conservatory
- Occupation: Actor
- Years active: 2015–present
- Known for: Emir Yüksel in Yasak Elma; Abidin in Kızılcık Şerbeti

Serkan Rutkay Ayıköz (born 14 September 1991) is a Turkish theatre, film, and television actor. He is of Abkhaz descent. He is best known for his roles as Emir Yüksel in the drama series Yasak Elma and as Abidin in Kızılcık Şerbeti.

== Early life and education ==
Serkan Rutkay Ayıköz was born on 14 September 1991 in Denizli. He belongs to the North Caucasian Abkhaz diaspora. After completing his secondary education at Denizli Anadolu High School, he moved to Istanbul. He graduated from the Theatre Department of the Mimar Sinan Fine Arts University State Conservatory.

== Career ==
Ayıköz began his acting career in theatre productions before making his television debut in 2015 with a supporting role in the series Hatırla Gönül. He later appeared in the mini-series Börü (Wolf), broadcast on BluTV, and its subsequent feature film adaptation in 2018.

His breakthrough came with the prominent role of Emir Yüksel in the popular FOX drama series Yasak Elma, which he portrayed from 2018 until the series finale in 2023. As of 2023, he stars as Abidin in the Show TV drama series Kızılcık Şerbeti.

Ayıköz actively maintains his cultural ties with the Caucasian diaspora, being closely associated with organizations such as the Abkhazian Cultural Association and the Beşiktaş Caucasian Association (Abas Solidarity Platform).

== Filmography ==
Year	Title	Role	Notes	Type
2015	Hatırla Gönül	Sabit	Supporting role	TV series
2016	Hayat Şarkısı		Supporting role	TV series
2018	Börü	Soner Seçkin	Supporting role	Internet series
2018	Börü (Film)	Soner Seçkin	Supporting role	Film
2018–2023	Yasak Elma	Emir Yüksel	Main / Supporting role	TV series
2020	Bir Yalnızlık Şarkısı	Çömez	Supporting role	Film
2023–present	Kızılcık Şerbeti	Abidin	Supporting role	TV series

== Theatre ==
- Woyzeck (2015)
- Blu (2017)
- Bir Avuç Kül (2018)
