= Sümeyra Koç =

Turkish actress (born 1987)

- Born: 27 February 1987 (age 39); Istanbul, Turkey
- Education: Istanbul Bilgi University
- Occupation: Actress
- Years active: 2010–present

Sümeyra Koç (born 27 February 1987) is a Turkish actress.

== Early life ==
Sümeyra Koç was born into a Bosniak family on 27 February 1987 in Istanbul. Her mother was from the Sandžak region of Serbia and her father was from Montenegro. After finishing her high school, she enrolled in Istanbul Bilgi University School of Public Relations. In her last year in university, she received education at a European university thanks to student exchange programs.

== Career ==
Upon her return to Turkey, Koç started taking acting lessons at Craft Acting Studios and Sadri Alışık Cultural Center.

She made her television debut with the TV series Galip Derviş adaptation of Monk, in which she played the character of Dilek. She had her first cinematic role 2013 with a part in the comedy movie Şevkat Yerimdar. In the same year she was cast in the popular fantasy series Sana Bir Sır Vereceğim as Duru, followed by another role as Havva in historical series Kurt Seyit ve Şura.

She later appeared as Pervin on the TV program Otel Divane, and portrayed the character of Günce in the TV series Günebakan. In 2015, she played the character of Zeynep in the TV series Kara Kutu, and portrayed another character with the same name in the movie Saruhan. Her main breakthrough came in 2017, with her role as Farah in Fazilet Hanım ve Kızları which made her known in Turkey.

== Filmography ==
Film
Year	Title	Role
2013	Şevkat Yerimdar	-
2015	Saruhan	Zeynep

Television
Year	Title	Role
2010–2014	Lale Devri	-
2013	Galip Derviş	Dilek
2013–2014	Sana Bir Sır Vereceğim	Healer (Duru)
2014	Kurt Seyit ve Şura	Havva
2014	Otel Divane	Pervin
2015	Günebakan	Günce
2015	Kara Kutu	Zeynep
2015–2017	Kiralık Aşk	-
2017–2018	Fazilet Hanım ve Kızları	Farah
2021	Sen Çal Kapımı	Mira
2021–2022	Bir Zamanlar Kıbrıs	Sandy
2023	Kraliçe	Gaye
2023	Altın Kafes	Alara Beyoğlu
2024–2025	Kimler Geldi, Kimler Geçti	Nil
