= Berk Atan =

Turkish actor (born 1991)

- Born: 26 September 1991 (age 34); İzmir, Turkey
- Occupation(s): Actor, model
- Years active: 2013–present
- Height: 1.88 m (6 ft 2 in)
- Website: www.berkatan.com.tr (in Turkish and English)

Berk Atan (born 26 September 1991) is a Turkish actor and model.

== Life and career ==
Atan was born on 26 September 1991 in Izmir. His paternal family is of Bosnian descent. He graduated from Beykent University in the department of acting.

Atan was chosen as one of the "Best Promises" on the 2011 Best Model of Turkey. He was the winner of 2012 Best Model of Turkey.

He made his acting debut in the series Her Şey Yolunda and portrayed the character of Selçuk Demircioğlu. He is mostly known for his role in hit family comedy drama series Gönül Dağı for the four seasons, in youth series Güneşin Kızları as Savaş alongside Burcu Özberk and as Selim in Cennet'in Gözyaşları alongside Almila Ada.

== Filmography ==
Television
Year	Title	Role	Notes
2013	Altındağlı	Pamir	Leading role
2013	Her Şey Yolunda	Selçuk	Leading role
2015-16	Güneşin Kızları	Savaş Mertoğlu	Leading role
2017	Dayan Yüreğim	Atıf Sinan Şanal	Leading role
2017–2018	Cennet'in Gözyaşları	Selim Arisoy / Ali Demir	Leading role
2020–	Gönül Dağı	Taner	Leading rolee
Movie
Year	Title	Role	Notes
2017	Tahin pekmez	Akif	Leading role, TV movie
TBA	Üçüncü Gün	Semih	Leading role
