= Almila =

Almila is a feminine Turkish given name. Notable people with the name include:

== People ==
=== Given name ===
- Almila Ada (born 1994), Turkish actress
- Almila Bagriacik (born 1990), Turkish-German actress

=== Surname ===
- Atso Almila (born 1953), Finnish orchestral conductor
