= Kuş Uçuşu =

2024 Turkish television drama series

- Genre: Drama
- Written by: Meriç Acemi
- Directed by: Deniz Yorulmazer(8 episodes, 2022); Koray Kerimoglu (8 episodes, 2023); Burak Müjdeci (8 episodes, 2024)
- Starring: Deniz Yorulmazer (1-8); Koray Kerimoğlu (9-16); Burak Müjdeci (17-24)
- Theme music composer: Toygar Isikli
- Country of origin: Turkey
- Original language: Turkish
- No. of seasons: 3
- No. of episodes: 24

Production
- Producers: Kerem Çatay(24 episodes, 2022-2024); Emrah Gamsizoglu (16 episodes, 2022-2023)
- Production locations: Istanbul, Turkey
- Running time: 50 minutes
- Production company: Ay Yapım

Original release
- Network: Netflix
- Release: 2022 – 2024

Kuş Uçuşu (English: As the Crow Flies), is a Turkish drama television series consisting of 24 episodes divided into three seasons, distributed on the Netflix streaming platform from June 3, 2022 to April 11, 2024. It is created by Meriç Acemi, who also wrote the screenplay, directed by Deniz Yorulmazer (in the first season), Koray Kerimoğlu (in the second season) and Burak Müjdeci (in the third season), produced by Ay Yapım and stars Birce Akalay, Miray Daner and İbrahim Çelikkol.

== Cast ==
Actor	Character
Birce Akalay	Lale Kıran
Miray Daner	Aslı Tuna
İbrahim Çelikkol	Kenan Sezgin
İrem Sak	Müge Türkmen
Burak Yamantürk	Selim Kıran
Defne Kayalar	Gül Simin
Demircan Kaçel	Yusuf Tunca
Şifanur Gül	Güliz Tümer
Zafer Ergin	Sulhi
Eren Çiğdem	Enver
Merve Hazer	Nihan
Bülent Çetinaslan	Ali
Elif Gökçe Özay	Özge
Ertan Ekmekçi	Nunu
Elif Kurtaran	Melisa
Merve Nil Güder	Mia
Muhammet Uzuner	Faruk
Özgür Daniel Foster	Onur
Melih Selçuk	Emre
Gülen Gedikoğlu	Hale İleri

== Episodes ==
Season	Episodes	Publication Türkiye	Publication Italy
First season	8	2022	
Second season	8	2023	
Third season	8	2024	

Not: The series was released on Friday in season 1, and on Thursday in seasons 2 and 3.

== Production ==
The series is created by Meriç Acemi, who also wrote the screenplay, directed by Deniz Yorulmazer (in the first season), Koray Kerimoğlu (in the second season) and Burak Müjdeci (in the third season) and produced by Ay Yapım.

=== Renewal ===
Following the success of the first season, the series was renewed for a second and third season.

=== Filming ===
Filming took place in and around Istanbul.

== Distribution ==
The series was distributed on the Netflix streaming platform from 3 June 2022 to 11 April 2024: the first season was distributed on 3 June 2022, the second season was distributed on 14 December 2023, while the third and final season was released April 11, 2024.
