= Tolga Sarıtaş =

Turkish actor

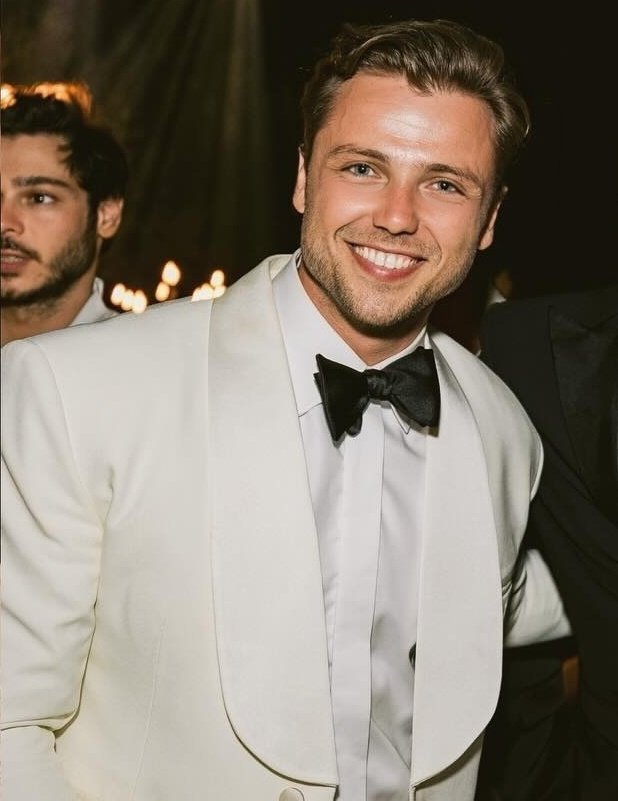
- Born: 30 May 1991 (age 35); Istanbul, Turkey
- Education: Istanbul University
- Occupation: Actor
- Years active: 2009–present
- Agent: Art Istanbul
- Spouse: Zeynep Mayruk (m. 2024)
- Children: 1

Tolga Sarıtaş (born 30 May 1991) is a prominent Turkish actor born on 30 May 1991 in Istanbul. He is best known for his performances in the historical drama Muhteşem Yüzyıl (2013–2014), the youth series Güneşin Kızları (2015–2016), the military drama Söz (2017–2019), the crime series Arıza (2020–2021), and the family drama Baba (2022–2023). In 2018, he was nominated for Best Actor at the 46th International Emmy Awards for his role in Söz, and later served as a jury member at the 47th International Emmy Awards. In 2017, Sarıtaş won the 44th Golden Butterfly Awards for Best Actor for his role in Söz.

== Career ==
=== TV series ===
He played in medical series Sen de Gitme with Eslem Akar. He had guest roles in popular series such as 20 Dakika, Arka Sokaklar, Öyle Bir Geçer Zaman ki. His breakthrough role is Şehzade Cihangir in Muhteşem Yüzyıl.

He had leading role as Ali Mertoğlu in youth drama Güneşin Kızları.

He played Yavuz Karasu in the successful military drama Söz. He has won numerous awards and was nominated for an International Emmy Award. Also he was final jury for choosing best lead actors in the 47th International Emmy Awards.

He played in crime series Arıza.

In addition to his acting career, Sarıtaş has appeared in many advertising campaigns and won many awards in that category.

=== Web series ===
He played in Büyük Sürgün Kafkasya mini historical series about Meskhetian Turks. He had guest role in surreal crime series Yarım Kalan Aşklar .

== Personal life ==
Sarıtaş began a relationship with fashion designer Zeynep Mayruk in 2019. They announced their engagement on 22 February 2024. The couple married on 27 June 2024 in Çeşme, Turkey. On 19 April 2025, they announced that they are expecting their first child. On 19 September 2025, they welcomed their first child, a son named Ali.

== Filmography ==
=== Film ===
Year	Title	Role	Notes
2009	Bahtı Kara	Berk	Supporting role
2011	Kaledeki Yalnızlık	Feyyaz	Supporting role
2017	Kötü Çocuk	Meriç Tuna	Leading role
2022	Yolun Açık Olsun	Second Lt. Kerim Kerimoğlu	Leading role

=== Web series ===
Year	Title	Role	Notes
2015	Büyük Sürgün Kafkasya	Cemil	Leading role
2020	Yarım Kalan Aşklar	Ozan	Guest appearance

=== TV series ===
Year	Title	Role	Notes
2011	Sen de Gitme	Mert	Supporting role
2012	Arka Sokaklar	Doğan	Guest role
2013	Öyle Bir Geçer Zaman Ki	Mert	Guest role
2013	20 Dakika	Ferdi	Supporting role
2013–2014	Muhteşem Yüzyıl	Şehzade Cihangir	Supporting role
2014	Benim Adım Gültepe	Murat	Leading role
2015–2016	Güneşin Kızları	Ali Mertoğlu	Leading role
2017–2019	Söz	Yavuz Karasu/Ömer Günay	Leading role
2019	Ferhat ile Şirin	Ferhat	Leading role
2020–2021	Arıza	Ali Rıza Altay	Leading role
2022	Baba	Kadir Saruhanlı	Leading role
2024–2025	Teşkilat	Altay Yalçindag	Leading role

== Awards and nominations ==
=== International ===
Year	Award	Category	Result
2018	46th International Emmy Awards	Best Performance by an Actor	Nominated

=== National ===
Year	Award Organization	Category	Result
2015	Ayaklı Gazete Awards	Best Actor	Nominated
2015	Turkey Youth Awards	Best Actor	Nominated
2016	23rd İTÜ EMÖS Başarı Awards	Best Actor	Won
2016	11th Makinist Media Arts Sport Awards	Most Popular Name in Social Media	Nominated
2016	Ankara Hukuk Ceride-i Kantar	Best Actor	Won
2016	Sabancı University Indigo Awards	Best Actor	Won
2017	44th Pantene Golden Butterfly Awards	Best Actor	Won
2017	Turkey Youth Awards	Best Actor	Won
2017	8th KTÜ Media Awards	Top Rated Actor	Nominated
2017	Academic Quality Awards	Best Actor	Won
2017	1st Turkey Children Awards	Best TV Drama Actor	Nominated
2017	Academic Quality Awards	Best Young Actor	Won
2018	Turkey Youth Awards	Best Actor	Nominated
2018	18th Internet Media Magazine Oscars	Best TV Drama Actor	Won
2018	Golden Palm Awards	Best Actor	Won
2018	2nd MüzikOnair Awards	Best Drama Actor	Won
2018	Istanbul University 1453 Awards	Best Actor of the Year	Nominated
2018	Turkey Youth Awards	Best Commercial (İpana)	Won
2018	7th Ayaklı Gazete Top of the Year Awards	Best Actor	Nominated
2018	45th Pantene Golden Butterfly Awards	Best Actor	Nominated
2019	14th Kemal Sunal Culture Arts Awards	Best Actor	Won
2019	Educational Sciences School	Best Actor	Won
2019	11th Effie Awards	Bronz Effie*(Pepsi Max)	Won
2019	Istanbul Aydın University Awards	Best Actor	Won
2020	Şehrin En İyileri Awards	Best Actor	Won
2021	Medipol İK Awards	Best Actor	Nominated
2022	Turkey Youth Awards	Best Actor	Nominated
2022	MGD 26rd Golden Objective Awards	Best Drama Actor	Won
2022	Atılım and Hürriyet Group - 2022's "Bests".	Male Player of the Year	Won
2024	50th Pantene Golden Butterfly Awards	Best Actor	Nominated
2025	Turkey Youth Awards	Best Actor	Nominated
