= Cennet'in Gözyaşları =

Turkish television series

- Also known as: Cennet
- Genre: Drama
- Based on: Tears of Heaven
- Directed by: Sadullah Celen; Aysun Akyüz Mehdiabbas
- Starring: Berk Atan; Almila Ada; Esra Ronabar
- Composer: Alp Yenier
- Country of origin: Turkey
- Original language: Turkish
- No. of seasons: 1
- No. of episodes: 36

Production
- Producer: Ali Gündoğdu
- Production location: Istanbul
- Production company: Süreç Film

Original release
- Network: ATV
- Release: 24 September 2017 – 17 June 2018

Cennet'in Gözyaşları is a Turkish drama television series that aired on ATV between 24 September 2017 and 17 June 2018. The series is based on the 2014 South Korean series titled Tears of Heaven.

== Plot ==
Cennet was abandoned by her mother as a newborn and her grandmother took care of her. Despite her humble upbringing and lack of financial resources, she becomes a brilliant architect and achieves her dream job at a prestigious architecture firm. Cennet is unexpectedly reunited with Selim, her childhood friend who also works in the firm, and her biological mother Arzu, who disappeared from her life and has now come to disrupt her world. Melisa is a second daughter of Arzu from another relationship, and she becomes very jealous about the increasing relationship of Cennet and Selim but at last she realizes that Selim would never love her and she leaves them alone.

== Cast ==
- Berk Atan as Selim Arısoy
- Almila Ada as Cennet Yılmaz
- Esra Ronabar as Arzu Soyer
- Yusuf Akgün as Orhan Soyer
- Zehra Yılmaz as Melisa Soyer
- Şencan Güleryüz as Cengiz Arısoy
- Hazım Körmükçü as Mahir Soyer
- Ebru Nil Aydın as Sema Soyer
- Çiçek Acar as Nilgün Arısoy
- Süeda Çil as Suna Gürsu
- Ebru Destan as Özlem Arısoy
- Sude Nur Yazıcı as Beste Tuna
- Oktay Çubuk as Ömer Gürsu
- Güler Ökten as Mukaddes Yılmaz
- Ali İpin as Rıza Soyer
