= Müjde Uzman =

Turkish actress (born 1984)

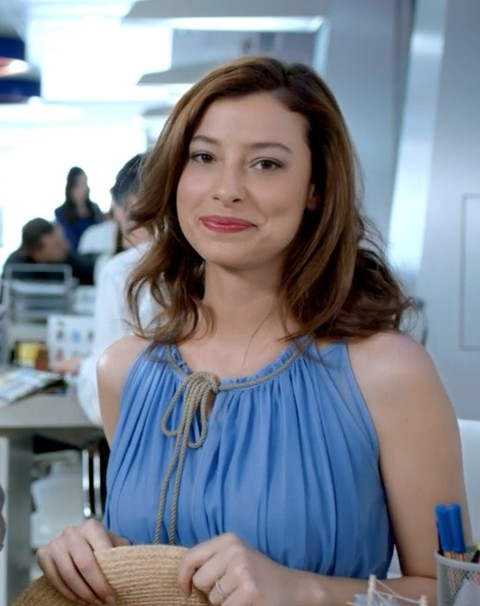
- Müjde Uzman in 2014
- Born: 26 September 1984 (age 42); Istanbul, Turkey
- Occupations: Actress, TV presenter
- Years active: 2008–present

Müjde Uzman (born 26 September 1984) is a Turkish actress.

== Career ==
In 2001, Uzman won the Elite Model Look contest. She then started working as a presenter on a number of music channels.

Uzman started her acting career in 2008 by taking part in the series Paramparça Aşklar. In 2010, she appeared as a guest on the Kapalı Çarşı and Aşk Bir Hayal series. She subsequently had her breakthrough with recurring roles in Eşkıya Dünyaya Hükümdar Olmaz, Muhteşem Yüzyıl and Kiralık Aşk. Between 2018 and 2019, she portrayed the character of Funda Turaç in the Savaşçı TV series.

Aside from her career on television, she has had roles in a number of movies, including Recep İvedik 2, Hadi İnşallah and 8.

== Filmography ==
Film
Year	Title	Role	Notes	Director
2008	Recep İvedik 2	Yoga Resepsiyonisti	Supporting role	Togan Gökbakar
2014	Hadi İnşallah	Bayan Kaltak	Supporting role	Ali Taner Baltacı
2018	8 (Sekiz)	Burcu	Leading role	Kekik
2022	Dost Kazığı		Leading role	Barış Erçetin
2023	Kutsal Damacana 4	İnci	Leading role	Kamil Çetin
2023	İllegal Hayatlar	Şeyma	Leading role	Cenk Çelik
2023	Kadınlara Mahsus	Şebnem Aksel	Leading role	Serdar Akar
Yakında	Zarafel	Havva Kadın	Leading role	Burak Kuka
Streaming films and series
Year	Title	Role	Notes	Platform
2021	Bunu Bi' Düşünün	Nalan	Konuk oyuncu	BluTV
2024	13 Urgan	Nurten	Leading role	YouTube
Television
Year	Title	Role	Notes	Network
2008	Paramparça Aşklar	Nil		Kanal 1
2010	Akasya Durağı	Özge	Guest appearance	Kanal D
2010	Kapalıçarşı		Guest appearance	atv
2010	Aşk Bir Hayal		Guest appearance	atv
2010	Halil İbrahim Sofrası	Müjgan	Guest appearance	TRT 1
2011	Bir Çocuk Sevdim	Derin	Supporting role	Kanal D
2011	Muhteşem Yüzyıl	Armin Hatun	Supporting role	Star TV
2013	Fatih	Dilyar	Leading role	Kanal D
2013	20 Dakika	Kuzgun (Umut Bilaloğlu)	Leading role	Star TV
2015–2016	Eşkıya Dünyaya Hükümdar Olmaz	Nazlı Meriç	Leading role	atv
2016–2017	Kiralık Aşk	Seda Berensel	Leading role	Star TV
2018	Babamın Günahları	Zümrüt	Supporting role	Star TV
2018-2019	Savaşçı	Pilot Üsteğmen Funda Turaç	Supporting role	FOX
2022	Evlilik Hakkında Her Şey	Yasemin Özdemirler	Guest appearance	FOX
2022–2024	Kızılcık Şerbeti	Alev Arslan	Leading role	Show TV
2024	Aşk, Evlilik, Boşanma	Gaye Tabipoğlu	Leading role	NOW
2025	Kral Kaybederse	Cansu Aydın	Supporting role	Star TV
2026	Tuzlu Kahve	Alev	Guest appearance	Star TV
