= Muro: Damn the Humanist Inside =

- Theatrical poster
- Directed by: Zübeyr Şaşmaz
- Written by: Raci Şaşmaz; Bahadır Özdener; Cüneyt Aysan
- Produced by: Raci Şaşmaz
- Starring: Mustafa Üstündağ; Selim Erdoğan; Bülent Şakrak; Evrim Alasya; Şefik Onatoğlu; Eray Türk
- Cinematography: Selahattin Sancaklı
- Edited by: Kemalettin Osmanlı
- Music by: J.P. Smadj; Cem Yıldız
- Production company: Pana Film
- Release date: December 5, 2008
- Running time: 90 mins
- Country: Turkey
- Language: Turkish
- Box office: US$14,073,100

Muro: Damn the Humanist Inside (Turkish: Muro: Nalet Olsun İçimdeki İnsan Sevgisine) is a 2008 Turkish comedy film, directed by Zübeyr Şaşmaz, starring Mustafa Üstündağ and Şefik Onatoğlu as two revolutionaries recently released from prison, who stumble across an illegal organization run by a former friend. The film, which went on general release across Turkey on December 5, 2008, is the third highest-grossing Turkish film of 2008. It is a spin-off from the Valley of the Wolves media franchise, based on the Turkish television series of the same name using characters from the sequel series Valley of the Wolves: Ambush.

== Synopsis ==
Muro (Mustafa Üstündağ) and Çeto (Şefik Onatoğlu), just released from prison, decide to return to their hometown to start a grassroots revolution. The first phase of their plan is to find two girls, get married and start their own families to become good exemplars of revolutionists. However, a surprise awaits them in their hometown. The village head has married Muro and Çeto to two Russian women while they were in prison. The two now have to return to İstanbul to find the women to whom they were married and get divorces if they want to realize their ideals. But on their return to the big city, they stumble across a massive illegal organization that they will never be able to decipher.

== Cast ==
- Mustafa Üstündağ as Muro
- Şefik Onatoğlu as Çeto
- Eray Türk as Yıldırım
- Selim Erdoğan as Muzo
- Nataliya Bondarenko as Olga
- Daria Litinova as Anna
- Evrim Alasya as Fidan
- Bülent Şakrak
- Demir Karahan

== Release ==
The film opened on general release in 237 screens across Turkey on December 5, 2008 at number two in the Turkish box office chart with a worldwide opening weekend gross of $1,988,609.

Opening weekend gross
Date	Territory	Screens	Rank	Gross
December 5, 2008	Turkey	237	2	$1,988,609
December 4, 2008	Germany	37	69	$475,955
December 5, 2008	Austria	6	7	$78,058
December 4, 2008	Netherlands	-	14	$33,594

== Reception ==
The movie was number two at the Turkish box office for two weeks running and was the third highest grossing Turkish film of 2009 with a total gross of $11,602,503. It remained in the Turkish box-office charts for seventeen weeks and made a total worldwide gross of $14,073,100.
