= Evrim Alasya =

Turkish actress (born 1979)

- Born: Müjde Evrim Alasya; 2 August 1979 (age 47); İzmir, Turkey
- Occupation: Actress
- Years active: 1999–present

Müjde Evrim Alasya (born 2 August 1979) is a Turkish actress.

== Life and career ==
She is a graduate of Dokuz Eylül University with a degree in theatre studies. She was a licensed athlete who participated in national and international competitions as a member of the Çimentaş Sports Club. Alasya, who started rhythmic gymnastics at the age of five, was a successful rhythmic gymnast in her high school years, but she eventually enrolled in the acting course of Konak Municipal Theater after finishing high school in 1997. She started her acting career in 1999 by joining the Pınar Children's Theatre. Alasya moved to Istanbul in 2003 to work in the Istanbul branch of the Pınar Children's Theatre and continued to work for them until 2006. She then joined the Acting Workshop, established in 1999 by Zuhal Olcay and Haluk Bilginer.

Alasya made her television debut with a minor role in the popular TV series Bir Istanbul Masalı. She was then noted for playing the role of the flirtatious singer "Balçiçek" in the TV series Gönülçelen in 2010. Her breakthrough came with her brief role in the historical drama Muhteşem Yüzyıl, in which she portrayed a young Hafsa Sultan. Between 2015 and 2016, she had a leading role in the series Güneşin Kızları. In 2020, her portrayal of the character Meliha in the TV series Kırmızı Oda was met with critical acclaim. Between 2020 and 2021, she portrayed role of Ferda in the TV series Akrep. Currently, she portrays role of Kıvılcım Arslan in the TV series Kızılcık Şerbeti.

== Theatre ==
- Lokomapüf
- Androcles and the Lion
- Mutluluk Dağıtan Eskici
- Mavi Pullu Balık
- Yel Değirmeni
- Fırtına
- Ben Bir Kurbağayım
- Küçük Kız ve Yıldız
- Ayrılık
- Deli Dumrul
- Timon of Athens
- 7 Şekspir Müzikali
- La Nuit de Valognes
- İki Bekar

== Filmography ==
Television
Year	Title	Role	Notes
2005	Ihlamurlar Altında	Sema	
2008	Gece Sesleri	Neslihan	
2010	Gönülçelen	Balçiçek	
2012	Muhteşem Yüzyıl	Young Ayşe Hafsa Sultan	
2014	Benim Adım Gültepe	Suna	
2015–2016	Güneşin Kızları	Güneş Yılmaz	Leading role
2018	Koca Koca Yalanlar	Müjgan	Leading role
2020	Kırmızı Oda	Meliha Kınık	Guest appearance
2020–2021	Akrep	Ferda Kendirci	Leading role
2022–present	Kızılcık Şerbeti	Kıvılcım Arslan	Leading role
Streaming series
Year	Title	Role	Notes
2023	Terzi	Kiraz	Supporting role
Film
Year	Title	Role	Notes
2008	Muro	Fidan	
2008	Başka Semtin Çocukları	Evrim	
