= Mustafa Üstündağ (actor) =

Turkish actor

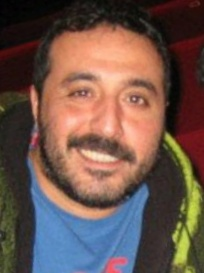
- Born: 11 February 1977 (age 49); Safranbolu, Turkey
- Occupation: Actor
- Years active: 1999–present
- Spouses: Ecem Özkaya (m. 2010; div. 2020) Tuğba Kalçık (m. 2022)
- Children: 2

Mustafa Üstündağ (born 11 February 1977) is a Turkish actor.

== Life and career ==
Üstündağ's father was a worker in Anadolu Glass Industry factory and his mother was a housewife. Her elder sister died when he was 5 years old. studied theatre at the Müjdat Gezen Art Center and then worked on stage at Kocaeli Regional Theater, Kartal Art Workshop, MSM Oyuncuları, and Pervasız Theatre. He first became noted with his role on ATV series Yersiz Yurtsuz alongside Ferdi Tayfur. He then played the role of an idealist named Talat in the movie Zincirbozan. In the movie Zeynep'in Sekiz Günü, he portrayed a trickster named Ali.

His breakthrough came with a role in the series Kurtlar Vadisi Pusu, in which he played the character of Muro. His performance in Muro: Nalet Olsun İçimdeki İnsan Sevgisine received critical acclaim. In 2017, he briefly appeared in the series Çukur as Kahraman Koçovalı. Between 2018 and 2020, he portrayed Boran Kayalı in Eşkıya Dünyaya Hükümdar Olmaz.

== Filmography ==
=== Film ===
- Aman Reis Duymasın – 2019
- Şeytan Tüyü – 2016
- Gulyabani – 2014
- Uzun Hikâye – 2012
- Kutsal Damacana 2: İtmen – 2010
- Vay Arkadaş – 2010
- Abimm – 2009
- Muro: Nalet Olsun İçimdeki İnsan Sevgisine – 2008
- Dilber'in Sekiz Günü
- Zeynep'in Sekiz Günü
- Zincirbozan – 2007
- Metropol Kabusu – 2003
- Neredesin Firuze – 2004
- Köçek – 2001
- Yolculuk – 2005
- Gülizar – 2004
- Emret Komutanım Şah Mat – 2007
- Ali'nin Sekiz Günü – 2008
- Vicdan
- Deli Dumrul - Kurtlar Kuşlar Aleminde

=== Television ===
- Eşkıya Dünyaya Hükümdar Olmaz – Boran Kayalı (2018–2020)
- Tehlikeli Karım – Fırat Engin (2018)
- Çukur – Kahraman Koçovalı (2017)
- Bana Sevmeyi Anlat – Haşmet Tuğcu (2016)
- Muhteşem Yüzyıl: Kösem – Kara Davud Pasha (2016)
- Aşkın Kanunu – Çetin (2014–2015)
- Uğurlanmış Arzular – (2013)
- Neyin Eksik
- Merhamet – Sermet Karayel (2013–2014)
- Karanlıklar Çiçeği – (2012)
- İzmir Çetesi – Selami (2011)
- Cümbür Cemaat
- Kurtlar Vadisi Pusu – Muro (2007–2009)
- Keje
- Bedel
- Yarım Elma (2002–2003)
- Yılan Hikâyesi
- Bizim Aile
- Aşka Sürgün
- Dikkat Bebek Var
- Uy Başuma Gelenler – Cemal
- Emret Komutanım – (2005)
- Zincir Bozan
- Hayalet
- Hayat Bilgisi – (2004)
- Yedi Numara
- Yersiz Yurtsuz
- Cennet Mahallesi

== Awards ==
- 16th Sadri Alışık Awards, "Best Supporting Actor in a Musical or Comedy" – Vay Arkadaş (2011)
