= Güneşin Kızları =

Turkish television series

- Genre: Romance, comedy, serial drama
- Directed by: Sadullah Celen
- Starring: Emre Kınay; Evrim Alasya; Tolga Sarıtaş; Burcu Özberk; Hande Erçel; Berk Atan; Miray Akay
- Country of origin: Turkey
- Original language: Turkish
- No. of seasons: 1
- No. of episodes: 39

Production
- Producers: Ismail Gündogdu; Inci Kirhan
- Production locations: Istanbul, Turkey
- Running time: 120 minutes (approx.)

Original release
- Network: Kanal D

Güneşin Kızları ("Sunshine Girls") is a Turkish television show starring Emre Kınay, Evrim Alasya, Tolga Sarıtaş, Burcu Özberk, Hande Erçel, Berk Atan and Miray Akay. The series aired on Kanal D from June 18, 2015 to March 19, 2016.

== Plot ==
Güneş is a 35-year-old woman who lives in Izmir with her three daughters. Her twins Nazlı and Selin who are 17 year olds and Peri who is 15. She is a literature teacher whose husband left her. She meets Haluk Mertoğlu and falls in love with him. She then decides to marry him, goes to İstanbul with her daughters and moves into Haluk's mansion. Selin is very happy with the move, and immediately tries to wiggle her way into the popular crowd of kids. However, Nazlı initially refuses as she doesn't trust Haluk and at first she doesn't move to İstanbul with her family but later joins them for the sake of her mother. She meets Haluk's nephew, Savaş who is very distant and suffering from a terrible trauma relating to his former dead girlfriend. Ali (Haluk's son) is not happy to welcome the guests and he targets Selin as his new opponent. Ali had a rough childhood and was never loved by his father or mother. As Selin starts giving support to Ali and shares his problems Ali develops soft corner for Selin. However Ali doesn't know how to express his feelings to Selin and many misunderstandings develop between them. Later on as they share their secrets with each other and Ali protects Selin from her father (Zafer), intense love develops between them. Nazlı and Savas slowly become friends and she falls for Savaş and helps him in his recovery and he too feels the same later on. Later it is uncovered that Ali isn't Haluk's son. He is son of Sevilay, Haluk's ex-wife and her old lover Levent. She didn't know she was pregnant when she married Haluk. When Ali learns of this and harms himself, Haluk realises he had been a poor father and apologizes. Also, Selin uncovers Haluk's deep dark secret which was that her mother was raped and her abuser was Haluk so the twins biological father was actually Haluk. Ali and Selin later get married despite Haluk's severe objections. Haluk tries to get them separated but to no avail. The truth comes out and Güneş has an accident which causes her to have a memory loss and she doesn't remember the time spent with Haluk or what he did to her. The sisters decide not to tell her and they all decide to move back to İzmir. Haluk after losing everything commits suicide and Ali and Savaş relocate to Izmir to join their lovers.

== Synopsis ==
This is a story of Güneş and her 3 daughters; twins, Selin and Nazlı, and Peri. They lived in İzmir. They decided to come to İstanbul when Güneş was proposed by a rich man Haluk.

Haluk's family include Rana (Haluk's elder sister), Ahmet (Haluk's younger brother), Inci (Ahmet's wife), Ali (son from ex-wife, Sevilay) and Savaş (Rana's adopted son). Sevilay (Haluk's ex-wife) lives separately.

1) Güneş believes Zafer, her ex-husband and ex lover too; raped her and her twins are his daughters but in reality, Zafer didn't rape her but Haluk did when she was in a cottage blindfolded in İzmir, summer of 1997. He claims he was in love with her. Zafer wants to take Peri, the youngest daughter and his true blood daughter to Germany for bone marrow so he could save his other daughter in Germany. He threatens Haluk that he'll tell this rape truth to Güneş. So Haluk throws him in front of a car which by accident Güneş was driving. She kills Zafer accidentally and they both decide to keep it a secret and Haluk buries Zafer's body in the woods to save Güneş from a life sentence since she had stabbed Zafer once before and was in jail because of it.

2) Tuğçe will later be friends and partners in crime too. She was once Emre's lover but they broke up. Selin was also the lover of playboy Emre but they break up because Selin is kissed by Ali, and they fall in love due to their common past.

3) Ali isn't Haluk's son. He is son of Sevilay, Haluk's ex-wife and her old lover Levent. She didn't know she was pregnant when she married Haluk. When Ali learns of this and harms himself, Haluk realises he had been a poor father and apologizes.

4) Levent appoints a bar dancer/stripper Elif to know more about Ali. She comes to the university with Ali and becomes his friend which obviously Selin doesn't like and she along with Tugçe tries to expose her because of her closeness to Ali.

5) Some 20 years ago, in 1997 Haluk was married to Sevilay and Ali was born. Haluk's younger brother Ahmet who is an architect, painted Güneş 20 years ago as he was also in love with her at the time. She doesn't know that.

6) Peri and Can (Tugçe's younger brother) later become a couple.

7) Haluk's sister (Rana) learns the truth that Haluk had raped Güneş and she tells Haluk that she knows the truth and tells him to divorce Güneş so that she can live a better life.

8) Ali also learns the truth and tries to kill Haluk with a gun. Selin sees this. Haluk also knows that Selin and Ali are lovers so he tells them to break up. After that, Selin arranges a marriage so that Ali will become normal but Ali gets even more broken so Selin asks him to get married for real.

9) Rana tells the truth to Güneş about her rape. Güneş gets extremely upset and tries to escape everyone with her daughters.

== Cast ==
Actor/Actress	Role	Notes
Emre Kınay	Haluk Mertoğlu	A businessman. Rana and Ahmet's brother. Ali's adoptive father and twins biological father. Güneş's second husband.
Evrim Alasya	Güneş Yılmaz Mertoğlu (Türkan Dargı)	A teacher. Mother of twins Selin and Nazli and little Peri. Haluk's second wife.
Tolga Sarıtaş	Ali Mertoğlu	Levent and Sevilay's son. Haluk's adoptive son. Selin's lover turned husband.
Hande Erçel	Selin Yılmaz Mertoğlu (Dargı)	Daughter of Haluk and Guneş. Adoptive daughter of Zafer. Peri's older sister and Nazli's younger sister, one of two twins. Ali's lover turned wife.
Burcu Özberk	Nazlı Yılmaz Mertoğlu (Dargı)	Daughter of Haluk and Güneş. Adoptive daughter of Zafer. Older Sister of Selin and Peri, one of two twins. Savaş's love interest.
Berk Atan	Savaş Mertoğlu	Rana's adoptive son and Haluk's adoptive nephew. Nazlı's love interest.
Miray Akay	Peri Yılmaz (Dargı)	Twin's younger sister. Zafer and Güneş's daughter.
Meltem Gülenç	Rana Mertoğlu	Haluk and Ahmet's older sister and Savaş's adoptive mother.
Funda İlhan	Sevilay	Haluk's ex-wife and Ali's mother.
Teoman Kumbaracıbaşı	Ahmet Mertoğlu	Haluk and Rana's younger brother. Inci's husband.
Süreyya Güzel	Inci Mertoğlu	Ahmet's wife.
İrem Helvacıoğlu	Tuğçe	Twin's enemy turned best friend. Emre's love interest.
Sarp Can Köroglu	Emre	Ali and Savas' best friend. Tuğçe's love interest.
Ali Pınar	Zafer	Guneş's ex husband and ex lover. Peri's father. Twin's adoptive father.
Fatih Dönmez	Levent Polat	Ali's biological father.
Ege Kökenli	Melissa	Savas' former girlfriend.
Kanat Heparı	Mert	Melissa's younger brother.

== International Broadcast ==
- Pakistan on Play Entertainment as Sunehri Titliyaan (سنہری تتلیاں)
- Kosovo on RTV21 as Vajzat e diellit
- North Macedonia on Alfa as Ќерки
- Bosnia and Herzegovina on Nova BH as Guneš i njene kćeri
- Romania on Kanal D Romania as Guneș
- Ethiopia on Kana TV as የፀሀይ ልጆች
- Bangladesh on Deepto TV as SurjaKonna (সূর্যকন্যা)
- Uzbekistan on Sevimli TV as Gunesh qizlari
- Georgia on Imedi TV as გიუნეშის ქალიშვილები
