= Onur Büyüktopçu =

Turkish actor

- Born: 24 April 1982 (age 43); Istanbul, Turkey
- Occupation: Actor
- Years active: 2003–present

Onur Büyüktopçu (born 24 April 1982) is a Turkish actor, cast director and manager. He is known for his roles in Kiralık Aşk, Memleket Hikayeleri and Hürmüz Gelin.

== Life and career ==
Onur Büyüktopçu was born on 24 April 1982 in Istanbul. His father is from Çankırı, while his mother is an Albanian immigrant. He lived in İzmir until the age of eighteen and finished his education there. To learn a foreign and take theater lessons, Büyüktopçu went to England and was educated at the Academy of Creative Training Brighton Act London Film Academy. He made his acting debut in 2003 portraying the character of Yusuf on the youth series Lise Defteri.

He later had guest roles in the series Yabancı Damat and Doktorlar. In 2010, he joined the cast of Güz Gülleri. Between 2015 and 2017, he portrayed the character of Koray on the TV series Kiralık Aşk. He then appeared as a presenter on TV8's cooking program Yemekteyiz. In 2019, he presented the Damat Bayıldı contest on Show TV. In May 2020, he began presenting the Çarkıfelek game show on Kanal D. Aside of his career in cinema and television, he also works as a cast director, manager and theater actor.

== Filmography ==
Cinema
Year	Title	Role	Notes
2007	Memleket Hikayeleri	Hüseyin	Leading role
2009	Hürmüz Gelin	Süleyman	Leading role
2022	Burçlar		
2022	Dikkat Köpek Var		Leading role
2023	Kutsal Damacana 4		
2023	Aşk Filmi	Gökmen	
Television
Year	Title	Role	Notes
2003	Lise Defteri	Yusuf	Supporting role
2004	Yabancı Damat	Emre	Guest appearance
2006	Fırtınalı Aşk	Nedim	Supporting role
2006	Doktorlar		Guest appearance
2007	Tatlı Bela Fadime	Özgür	Supporting role
2007	Kavak Yelleri	Hakan	Supporting role
2007	Üç Tatlı Cadı	Yemek hocası	Supporting role
2010	Güz Gülleri		Supporting role
2011	Kollama		Guest appearance (episode 132)
2015–2017	Kiralık Aşk	Koray Sargın	Supporting role
2017–2019	Yemekteyiz	Himself	Presenter; Turkish version of Come Dine with Me
2019	Jet Sosyete	Himself	Guest appearance (episode 37)
2019	Damat Bayıldı	Himself	Presenter
2020–	Çarkıfelek	Himself	Presenter
2020	Gelinim Mutfakta	Himself	Presenter
2021	Menajerimi Ara	Himself	Guest appearance (episode 37)
