= Yemekteyiz =

Turkish TV series

- Genre: Cookery
- Directed by: Naim Tanç
- Presented by: Onur Büyüktopçu (2017–2019); Seda Sayan (2019–2020) Zuhal Topal (2020-?)
- Narrated by: Tarkan Koç
- Country of origin: Turkey
- Original language: Turkish

Production
- Production locations: Istanbul; Bursa; Adana; Trabzon; Çanakkale; Cologne; Northern Cyprus; Şanlıurfa; Paris; Amsterdam; Rize; Kayseri; İzmir; North Macedonia; Mardin; Bodrum
- Running time: 90 minutes

Original release
- Network: Show TV (2008-2011); Fox (2012-2014); Kanal D (2015); TV8 (since 2017)
- Release: 12 October 2008 – present

Yemekteyiz (lit. 'We Are At Meal') is a Turkish television reality series based on the Come Dine with Me format which initially premiered on Show TV in October 2008. The program was later transferred to Fox in October 2012. Since 2017, it has been broadcast on TV8. A group consisting of five people who do not know each other go to each individual's house every evening and rate the food on a scale of 0 to 10. At the end of the fifth day, the contestant with the highest score wins ₺150,000.

Viewed in Turkey as a continuation to the program Biri Bizi Gözetliyor, which was centered around the daily lives and cooking of people, Yemekteyiz has been the subject of various comedy sketches on different TV shows, including Avrupa Yakası and CoMedya.

Yemekteyiz costs ₺1,200 per episode and due to the popularity it achieved, its format was copied by various TV channels. Examples include ATV's Komşu Komşu, FOX's Tadında Aşk Var and Zuhal Topal'la Sofrada, and Star TV's Yemeğe Bizdeyiz.

== Popularity ==
Sociologists attributed the popularity of the program to the fact that the Turkish people were less likely to read books, and more likely to follow the controversies among the contestants, approve the legitimation of cooking and spending time in the kitchen by TV programs, and favor the format of "winning and losing".

Show TV's Interior Productions Director Caner Erdem stated in his interview that the underlying reason for the popularity of the program was the reality of daily interactions that was reflected in it.

Since the day it has been broadcast in Turkey, the program has garnered a lot of popularity. According to sociologist Zafer Yenal the interest in the public and political arena in recent years, the impact of the world recession and the increasing sequence of interest in many parts of the private sphere are the most important factors that make this program popular in Turkey.
