= Sibel Taşçıoğlu =

Turkish actress

- Born: 28 July 1976 (age 49); Osmangazi, Bursa, Turkey
- Occupation: Actress
- Years active: 1995–present
- Spouse: Murat Kolçakköstendil (m. 2016)

Sibel Taşçıoğlu Kolçakköstendil (born 28 July 1976) is a Turkish actress.

== Life and career ==
Sibel Taşçıoğlu was born on 28 July 1976 in Osmangazi, Bursa. In 1995, she started her acting career by appearing in the children's play Tılsım, staged at the Bursa State Theatre. In 1997, she started her studies at the theatre department of Istanbul University State Conservatory. Between 2000 and 2003, she appeared in a number of plays staged at Tiyatro Fora, including Yan Etkili Konuşmalar, Play It Again, Sam, and Apaçık. In 2007 she appeared in the role of Anna Karenina at Kenter Theatre. Her cinematic debut was in 1998 with a role in Rus Gelin. She has also appeared in numerous TV series, including Kırık Ayna, Mühürlü Güller, Yadigar, Ekmek Teknesi, Gözyaşı Çetesi, Gönül Salıncağı, Serçe, Pulsar adn Muhteşem Yüzyıl: Kösem. Taşçıoğlu has additionally done various voice overs. She rose to prominence with her role as Nevin in Medcezir.

== Filmography ==
Television
Year	Title	Role
1995	Çiçek Taksi	
2000	Karakolda Ayna Var	
2000	Evdeki Yabancı	
2002	Ekmek Teknesi	Sevda
2002	Berivan	
2002	Kibar Ana	
2002	Anne Babamla Evlensene	
2003	Mühürlü Güller	
2004	Büyük Buluşma	Mihriban
2004	Yadigar	Oya
2005	Belalı Baldız	Mehtap
2006	Gözyaşı Çetesi	Sevda
2007	Gönül Salıncağı	
2008	Pulsar	Sinem
2009	Aile Saadeti	Belkıs
2010	Yasemince	Gülay
2011	Geniş Aile	Firuze
2012	Bulutların Ötesi	Asiye
2013–2015	Medcezir	Nevin Koper
2016	Kehribar	Sanem Yarımcalı
2016	Muhteşem Yüzyıl: Kösem	Gülbahar Sultan
2017–2018	Kızlarım İçin	Ayten Yılmaz
2018–2022	Bir Zamanlar Çukurova	Şermin Yaman
2022–2025	Kızılcık Şerbeti	Pembe Ünal
2025	Çarpıntı	Tülin Alkan
Film
Year	Title	Role
1999	Akşam Güneşi	
2003	Rus Gelin	Fatma
2015	Son Mektup	Gülmelek
2018	Bizim İçin Şampiyon	Meral Atman

== Voice overs ==
Voice overs
Year	Title	Role
2004	The Incredibles	
2007	Meet the Robinsons	
2008	The Incredible Hulk	
2009	The Princess and the Frog	
2010	Robin Hood	
2010	Alice in Wonderland	
2011	Sucker Punch	
2011	Arthur Christmas	
