= Gülsim Ali =

Turkish actress (born 1995)

- Born: 18 February 1995 (age 31); Ruse, Bulgaria
- Occupation: Actress
- Years active: 2012–present
- Height: 1.77 cm (1 in)

Gülsim Ali (born 18 February 1995) is a Bulgarian and Turkish television actress and model. She is best known for many historical roles such as Aslıhan Hatun in Diriliş: Ertuğrul and family comedies Gönül Dağı, Hanım Köylü.

== Life and career ==
Ali's parents are from the Turkish minority in Bulgaria. She is fluent in Turkish, Bulgarian, English and Japanese.

In 2009, she won a contest named 'Super Model Ford Models Bulgaria'. in the same year, she delineated Bulgaria in 'Ford Models of the World' beauty contest in Brazil.

She started her acting in 2012 by starring in the historical series Balkanlar 1912 alongside Hazal Kaya, Furkan Palalı. She played in crime series "Son Çıkış" with Dolunay Soysert, Furkan Palalı. She played in mini historical series Seddülbahir 32 Saat alongside Dolunay Soysert, İbrahim Çelikkol, Uğur Güneş.

She was one of the leading actresses in the family comedy series Hanım Köylü, in which she depicted the character of İlkgün, along with the actor Yusuf Çim.

Ali joined as the role of Aslıhan Hatun, the youngest daughter of Candar Bey, in the 2014 Turkish historical series Diriliş: Ertuğrul alongside Uğur Güneş. In 2019, she depicted the character of Ayşegül in the series Yüzleşme. In the same year, she joined in the historical drama series Payitaht: Abdülhamid as Gülcemal.

In 2020, she had a leading role in the popular family comedy series Gönül Dağı and depicted the character of Dilek. She had leading role in military series Al Sancak alongside Uğur Güneş for third time.

== Filmography ==
Web series
Year	Title	Role	Notes	
2026	Harman Yeri	Cemre	Leading role	
TV series
Year	Title	Role	Episode	Notes
2012	Son Yaz: Balkanlar 1912	Ayşe	1–4	Supporting role
2015	Son Çıkış	Ege	7–12	Supporting role
2016	Seddülbahir 32 Saat	Zeliha		Leading role
2016	Hanım Köylü	İlkgün	1–13	Leading role
2016–2018	Diriliş: Ertuğrul	Aslıhan Hatun	62–113	Supporting role
2019	Yüzleşme	Ayşegül	1–4	Supporting role
2019–2020	Payitaht: Abdülhamid	Gülcemal	89–102	Supporting role
2020–2022	Gönül Dağı	Dilek	1–65	Leading role
2023	Al Sancak	Nadia Ivanov/Sıla Korkmaz	1–19	Leading role
2025	Bereketli Topraklar	Nevin Yılmaz		Leading role
2026	Asırlık Gece	Hatice Kübra Çiftçi		Leading role
Film
Year	Title	Role	Notes	
2021	Gönül Dağı "Kurban"	Dilek Akgün	Leading role	
2022	Kurtuluş Hattı	Hilal	Leading role	
2026	Geçmişin Kokusu	Elina	Leading role	
