= Sıla Türkoğlu =

Turkish actress (born 1999)

- Born: 18 April 1999 (age 27); İzmir, Turkey
- Education: Hatice Güzelcan Anatolian High School
- Occupation: Actress
- Years active: 2018–present

Sıla Türkoğlu (born 18 April 1999) is a Turkish actress best known for starring in the Show TV series Kızılcık Şerbeti (2022–2025). She won a Golden Butterfly Award for it.

== Life and career ==
Türkoğlu started her television acting career in 2018 with the series Ağlama Anne. In 2019, she played the character of Suna in the television series Yemin and later the character of Seher in the TV series Emanet, which started broadcasting on Kanal 7 on 7 September 2020. She left the TV series Emanet with its 416th episode, which was broadcast on 4 July 2022.

She currently plays the role of Doğa in Kızılcık Şerbeti, a Turkish drama series on Show TV.

== Filmography ==
Television
Year	Title	Role	Notes
2018	Ağlama Anne	Alev	Guest appearance
2019–2020	Yemin	Suna Tarhun	Supporting role
2020–2022	Emanet	Seher Kırımlı	Leading role
2022–2025	Kızılcık Şerbeti	Doğa Korkmaz	Leading role
2026	Doktor: Başka Hayatta	Elif	Leading role
Year	Title	Role	Notes
2022	Sadece Arkadaşız		Guest appearance

== Awards and nominations ==
Awards
Year	Award	Category	Result	Ref.
2023	49th Golden Butterfly Awards	Shining Stars	Won	
