= Bülent Şakrak =

Turkish actor and TV presenter (born 1977)

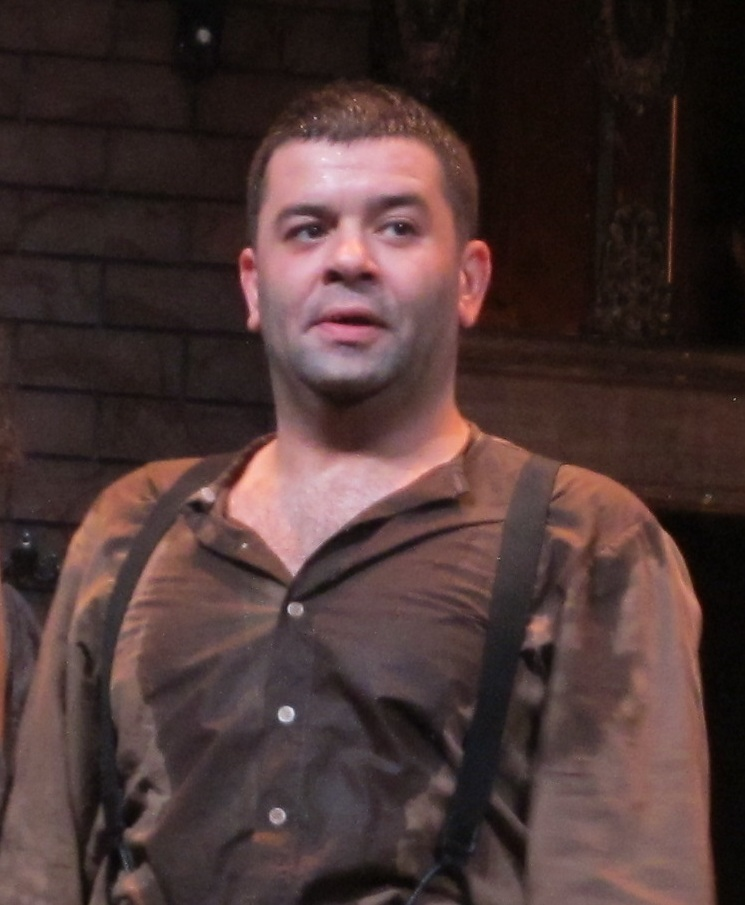
- Bülent Şakrak on stage in February 2012
- Born: 26 August 1977 (age 47); Istanbul, Turkey
- Occupation(s): Actor, TV presenter
- Years active: 1995–present
- Spouses: Özge Borak (m. 2006; div. 2010) Ceyda Düvenci (m. 2015; div. 2023)
- Children: 1
- Relatives: Erkan Kolçak Köstendil (cousin)

Bülent Şakrak (born 26 August 1977) is a Turkish actor and TV presenter.

== Life and career ==
Şakrak was born on 26 August 1977 in Istanbul. He began his career on stage in 1996 by taking part in youth and children's plays at Kartal Art Studios. In 1998, he enrolled in the Theatre Department of Istanbul University State Conservatory. After leaving Kartal Art Studios, he got roles in Müjdat Gezen Theatre and Yayla Art Center Theatre before entering the cast of Kent Oyuncuları in 2004. There he was cast in various plays such as Dying For It, The 39 Steps, Dealer's Choice and The Lieutenant of Inishmore. After bringing The 39 Steps to stage at the Istanbul State Theatre in 2016, he worked as a narrator for the play Fully Committed, which was performed in the same venue. He played as Avni in hit police series "Yılan Hikayesi". Aside from his career on stage, Şakrak has been cast in various TV series and has his first role in a web series with BluTV's Dudullu Postası in 2018. He has also presented his own program Bülent Şakrak'la Art Niyet on YouTube.

== Theatre ==
- Fully Committed : Becky Mode - Istanbul State Theatre - 2018 (narrator)
- Testosterone : Andrzej Saramonowicz - Oyun Studio - 2013
- Macbeth : William Shakespeare - Pangar - 2012
- Dying For It: Moira Buffini - Kent Oyuncuları - 2011
- The Walworth Farce : Enda Walsh - Tiyatro Gerçek - 2010
- The Miser : Molière - Kent Oyuncuları - 2008
- The 39 Steps : John Buchan/Patrick Barlow - Kent Oyuncuları - 2007/2016
- Dealer's Choice : Patrick Marber - Kent Oyuncuları - 2004
- The Lieutenant of Inishmore : Martin McDonagh - Kent Oyuncuları - 2003
- Boing Boing: Marc Camoletti - Sadri Alışık Theatre - 2003
- Buzlar Çözülmeden: Cevet Fehmi Başkut - Yayla Art Center - 2000
- Yedi Kocalı Hürmüz: Sadık Şendil - Müjdat Gezen Theatre - 1999
- Hababam Sınıfı: Rıfat Ilgaz - Müjdat Gezen Theatre - 1998

== Filmography ==
=== Film ===
- Tamirhane (2022)
- Acı Kiraz (2020)
- 5 Dakkada Değişir Bütün İşler (2016)
- Son Mektup (2015)
- Yapışık Kardeşler (2015)
- Çilek (2014)
- İksir:Dedemin Sırrı (2014)
- Ay Büyürken Uyuyamam (2011)
- 72. Koğuş (2010)
- Abimm (2009)
- Melekler ve Kumarbazlar (2009)
- Eyyvah Eyvah (2009)
- Kutsal Damacana 2: İtmen (2009)
- Ezber (short film) (2009)
- Süper Ajan K9 (2008)
- Muro: Nalet Olsun İçimdeki İnsan Sevgisine (2008)
- Ona Melek Deme (short film) (2006)
- Sır Çocukları (2002)
- Halk Çocuğu (2000)

=== TV series ===
- Kudüs Fatihi Selahaddin Eyyubi - 2024-
- Maviye Sürgün - 2023
- Dünya Bu - 2023 (web series)
- The Life and Movies of Erşan Kuneri - 2022
- Misafir - 2021
- Sefirin Kızı - 2020
- Dudullu Postası - 2018 (web series)
- Hangimiz Sevmedik - 2016
- Ayrılsak da Beraberiz - 2015
- Neyin Eksik? (2013)
- Karanlıklar Çiçeği - 2012
- İki Yaka Bir İsmail 2012
- Arka Sokaklar - 2011
- İzmir Çetesi - 2011
- Yıldız Masalı - 2011
- Küçük Kadınlar - 2009
- Kurtlar Vadisi Pusu - 2009
- Eşref Saati - 2008
- Gece Gündüz - 2008-2009
- Zeliha'nın Gözleri - 2007
- Güzel Günler - 2007
- Karınca Yuvası - 2006
- Sensiz Olmuyor - 2005
- Kısmet (2005)
- Beni Bekledinse - 2004
- Sihirli Annem - 2003
- Kumsaldaki İzler - 2002
- İki Arada - 2002
- Kınalı Kar - 2002
- Pembe Patikler - 2002
- Yılan Hikayesi - 1999
- Bizim Aile - 1995

== Awards ==
- 2011 - 16th Sadri Alışık Cinema and Theatre Awards, Most Successful Actor of the Year (shared with Hakan Gerçek and İlker Ayrık)
- 2008 - VIII. Lions Theatre Awards, Best Comedy Actor (The 39 Steps)
