= Once Upon a Time in Cyprus =

Turkish series about Turkish Cypriots took place before the Turkish invasion of Cyprus

- "Bir Zamanlar Kıbrıs/ Kıbrıs Zafere Doğru"
- Genre: Historical action
- Inspired by: Conflict of Cyprus
- Developed by: TMC
- Written by: Emre Özdür; Başar Başaran
- Directed by: Hakan İnan (Season 1) Osman Taşcı/Barış Erçetin (Season 2)
- Starring: Ahmet Kural; Serkan Çayoğlu; Pelin Karahan; Tayanç Ayaydın; Gülper Özdemir; Devrim Saltoğlu; Miray Akay
- Country of origin: Turkey
- Original language: Turkish
- No. of seasons: 2

Production
- Executive producer: Erol Avcı
- Production location: Northern Cyprus

Original release
- Network: TRT 1
- Release: 2 April 2021 – 4 February 2022

Once Upon a Time in Cyprus (Turkish: Bir Zamanlar Kıbrıs; Turkish pronunciation: [biɾ zamanɫaɾ kɯbɾɯs]) (Greek: Κάποτε στην Κύπρο) is a Turkish historical television drama series broadcast by TRT 1. It is set in 1960s Cyprus,

== Premise ==
The series takes place during the period of Bloody Christmas and depicts attacks carried out on Turkish Cypriots. It focuses on the activities of the Greek Cypriot nationalist group EOKA-B. The series is based on the island-wide violence that led to the Turkish Invasion of Cyprus that ended in 1974.

== Cast and characters ==
| Actor/Actress | Role | Episodes starred in |
|---|---|---|
| Ahmet Kural | Kemal Dereli | 1-24 |
| Serkan Çayoğlu | Ankaralı/Ali Ihsan Cenkeri/Bereli | 1-24 |
| Pelin Karahan | İnci Dereli | 1-24 |
| Gülper Özdemir | Doctor Ayşe Inan | 1-24 |
| Tayanç Ayaydın | Nikos Sampson | 1-24 |
| Devrim Saltoğlu | Rauf Denktaş | 1-24 |
| Hasan Küçükçetin | Derviş | 1-24 |
| Miray Akay | Pembe Dereli | 1-24 |
| Deniz Baytaş | Sıtkiye Dereli | 1-24 |
| Ahmet Mark Somers | Salahi Dereli | 1-19 |
| Ömer Turan | Bekir | 1-24 |
| Nebil Sayın | Georgios Grivas | 1-22 |
| Emre Törün | Makarios III | 1-22 |
| Hakan Güner | Fazıl Küçük | 1- |
| Yunus Destebaşı | Ahmet Çavuş | 1- |
| Bade Arazlı | Mine Dereli | 1-22 |
| Sümeyra Koç | Sandy | 3-24 |
| Rüzgar Irmakoğlu | Müge Dereli | 2-22 |
| Umut Avcı | Hamit | 1-24 |
| Sanlı Baykent | Chief | 1-7 |
| Kemal Uçar | Cpt. Cengiz Topel | 8-13 (As flashback in Ep. 14) |

== Series overview ==
| Season | Local broadcast time | Season start | Season end | Episodes range | Episodes published | Season year | TV channel |
|---|---|---|---|---|---|---|---|
| No. 1 | Thursday, 8:00 PM | April 1, 2021 | June 6, 2021 | 1-9 | 9 | 2021 | TRT 1 |
| No. 2 | Friday, 8:00 PM | October 16, 2021 | February 4, 2022 | 10-24 | 14 | 2021–2022 | TRT 1 |

== Production ==
Some parts of the series were shot in İncirli Cave, which is connected to Lefkoniko. Oğuz Vadili, President of the Chamber of Earth Science Engineers, stated that it is impossible to fix the damage that may have occurred during the production in the cave, which was formed 200,000 years ago, and said that the filming should not have been allowed.

The families of the two Turkish Cypriot leaders' who were the subject of the series criticized the series for showing their relatives wrong.

The newspaper of Halkın Sesi, which is run by Fazıl Küçük's son Mehmet Küçük and founded by Fazıl Küçük himself, appeared with the headline "Disrespecting to our leader and the historical facts". Mehmet Küçük stated that Fazıl Küçük was "almost ignored" in the series, "Our leader Dr. Küçük, who is presented as the second-degree man, is shown in a faint character." used the expression.

Ender Vangöl, daughter of Rauf Denktaş, said that her father "never shared the pain of any of his children with anyone, especially crying at such a time", that the series "created a different character named 'Rauf' whoever the history consultants were." after she saw it is shown in the trailer of the second episode of the series where her father is crying to the Ankaralı about the death of his child.

Vangöl said, "We, as Turkish Cypriots, by such of mistakes, will lose our personaility and experiences of our honorable resistance, thanks to those who gave their approval without making a sound in the face of being told about our struggle for existence, which has been gained in 11 years."

== Technical crew ==
The director of the series is Hakan İnan, its producer is Erol Avcı, and its executive producer is Engin Sarıal. The screenplay is written by Emre Özdür and Başar Başaran.

The deputy director of the series is Hülya Akdemir, and the Second Director is Harun Berdo. The Director of Photography is Hüseyin Tunç, the General Art Director is Burhan Türk, and the Art Director is Nanaz Bahram. The music of the series is prepared by Çiğdem Erken. The cast directors of the series are Rabia Sultan Düzenli and Emre Akbaş. The costumes of the series are designed by Oğuzhan Bozali and Ceyda Atlas. Postproduction Manager is Burak Akgül. The editing of the series is made by Zeki Öztürk and Engin Behlül. Production Manager is Varol Ural, Production Coordinators are Engincan Malçok and Murat Toprak. Reji Coordination Officer is Cengiz Buğra Çakallı and Lighting Chief Mehmet Yavaş. Set Supervisor is Sezgin Sarıal.
