= The Tailor (TV series) =

2023 Turkish TV series

- Also known as: Terzi
- Genre: Drama; Mystery; Thriller
- Written by: Rana Mamatlıoğlu; Bekir Baran Sıtkı
- Directed by: Cem Karcı
- Starring: Çağatay Ulusoy; Şifanur Gül; Salih Bademci; Olgun Şimşek
- Music by: Fırat Yükselir
- Country of origin: Turkey
- Original languages: Turkish, Greek
- No. of seasons: 3
- No. of episodes: 23

Production
- Producer: Onur Güvenatam
- Production company: OGM Pictures

Original release
- Network: Netflix
- Release: 2 May 2023 – present

The Tailor (original title Terzi) is a Turkish television series starring Çağatay Ulusoy, Salih Bademci, Şifanur Gül and Olgun Şimşek. The series is produced by OGM pictures and directed by Cem Karcı. The series premiered on 2 May 2023 on Netflix.

The series was initially going to be titled Süslü Korkuluk (Fancy Scarecrow) and broadcast on TV8 but Netflix became its eventual distributor. The series is based on a culmination of a psychiatrist's patient's experiences. It follows Peyami Dokumacı, a young and famous tailor who inherited talent and a successful business from his grandfather. With the death of his grandfather, Peyami brings his father Mustafa who is his biggest secret and has a child-like intelligence to his life in Istanbul and now has to take care of him without a soul finding out the truth. Running away from her abusive relationship with Dimitri, Esvet mysteriously appears in Peyami and Mustafa's lives with her own secrets.

== Cast ==
- Çağatay Ulusoy as Peyami Dokumacı
- Şifanur Gül as Esvet/Firuze
- Salih Bademci as Dimitri
- Olgun Şimşek as Mustafa
- Berrak Tüzünataç as Cemre
- Engin Şenkan as Dede Peyami
- Evrim Alasya as Kiraz
- Ece Sükan as Suzi (Suzan)
- Vedat Erincin as Ari
- Celile Toyon as Sülün
- Lilâ Gürmen as Lia
- Murat Kılıç as Faruk
- Zeynep Özyurt Tarhan as İrini

== Overview ==
Season	Episodes	Originally released		
Season	Episodes	First released	Last released	Network
1	7	May 2, 2023	May 2, 2023	Netflix
2	8	July 28, 2023	July 28, 2023	Netflix
3	7	November 3, 2023	November 3, 2023	Netflix

== Plot ==
Peyami is a famous tailor, living remotely from his family. When his grandfather dies his grandmother comes to Istanbul along with his father Mustafa who is mentally challenged having a child-like intelligence. For Peyami even the existence of his father has been a shame to him. The series tells the story of his difficult life where he falls in love with his client, a bride-to-be, whose wedding dress he is hired to sew.

== Production ==
=== Development ===
In the early 2021, it was reported that a new script was being written specifically for Çağatay Ulusoy. On his birthday in September, it was reported that the show was going to be titled Yalı Çapkını. After a few days, it was reported that Ulusoy did not like the script and therefore the project was shelved. Then journalist Ranini reported that a new script from the same company was liked by Ulusoy and then the contract was signed and show's name became Süslü Korkuluk ("Fancy Scarecrow" in English). The name of series was later changed to Terzi ("The Tailor" in English). Rana Mamatlıoğlu and Bekir Baran Sıtkı are the scriptwriters of the show. The story is indirectly based on the book Hayata Dön ('Return to Life') by Gülseren Budayıcıoğlu.

=== Casting ===
Çağatay Ulusoy was the first actor whose name was attached to the series. Alina Boz and Hafsanur Sancaktutan's names were mentioned and it was said that they were interviewed by the director. On 5 January singer Ayaz Tezcan himself announced that he would be a part of the show. Actress Beste Kanar joined the show as well on the same date. Alina Boz was confirmed to be the leading actress. However, when the show was transferred from TV8 to Netflix Alina Boz withdrew her name.

Esra Bilgiç was then cast alongside Çağatay Ulusoy. On 1 April, it was reported that Bilgiç had left the project, and she posted a statement on her Instagram page on 3 April conforming her departure. A journalist from Turkey's largest newspaper Hürriyet wrote that Esra Bilgiç caused problems for the filming crew and asked for a raise twice before the filming began. As a result she was fired from the set. However on the same night, Bilgiç posted a story stating that she could not sign a contract when she could not agree to the work conditions and made a decision to leave the show because of the exclusivity contract which prevented her to work on any other series unless it was produced by Netflix. One of the journalists came in her support and said that the producer was ready to pay her thrice but she chose honor instead of money. No statement came from the production company OGM or Netflix about the incident.

Finally the producers of the show chose Şifanur Gül as the leading actress. It marked the first time Gül had been cast in a leading role after playing minor and supporting roles in series such as The Red Room, Glass Ceilings and As the Crow Flies. Olgun Şimşek was cast to play the role of Ulusoy's father who has a child-like intelligence. For the role of the antagonist, Dimitri, Fatih Artman and Salih Bademci were interviewed. Bademci initially refused the offer but when the show was transferred to Netflix he agreed to play the role. The name of Ulusoy's character in the show was announced as Peyami while the name of the character of the female lead was announced as Esvet. The child actor Emir Ali Doğrul was also cast in the series. Ulusoy and Doğrul had earlier worked together in the Netflix film Paper Lives.

Ece Sükan joined the cast as Suzi who is the right hand woman to Ulusoy's character. Engin Senkan portrayed Peyami's grandfather. Evrim Alasya joined the show near the finale of season one. Berrak Tüzünataç's character was built up to appear in the show's second season. Tüzünataç had to leave the show O Kız to be the part of the show in season 3 which was scheduled to start shooting immediately after the end of filming of season 2.

=== Teaser release ===
On the eve of 2022 New year the first teaser trailer of the show was released. It was first shown on TV8's New year special O Ses Türkiye. The teaser made it clear that Ulusoy was going to play the role of a designer in the series. No other actors were shown in the teaser. Director Cem Karcı came from Barcelona to shoot it and went back the next day after shooting it. The teaser shows Ulusoy dressing up a scarecrow. A few days after the show got transferred to Netflix, the teaser was deleted from TV8's website where it was supposed to air earlier. The first glimpse of the series was shown on Netflix Turkey's New Year party on 4 November. Netflix announced a release date for the series along with a teaser on 10 April. A special genre specific moment clip from season one was released on 13 April. The official trailer of the series was shared on 24 April with a description "What if your past is stitched to your future?"

=== Release controversy ===
The show was initially supposed to be aired on TV8. However, a few days after the release of the teaser the information about the show disappeared from TV8's website. It was announced by journalists that the budget of the show exceeded and the channel could not afford it. It was then announced that the series would air on Disney+ along with the opening of the platform in Turkey, but then Netflix bought the broadcasting rights of the series.

=== Filming ===
Filming began on 29 March 2022 in Kırklareli. The place was chosen to shoot the flashback scenes. The area is also the place where Ulusoy had earlier shot his short film Birdie and where he had a guest appearance as himself in the series Menajerimi Ara. The municipality of Kadıköy informed that the shooting of the series is taking place in the district in the Kadıköy Yoğurtçu Park in a special closed set. During the filming of one of the action scenes in the car, the camera mounted on the top of it came off and Ulusoy survived the accident as it fell on the road. If the camera had broken through the glass Ulusoy would have suffered serious injuries. He was one of the owners of the company which provided the camera for ₺500,000. However later his girlfriend refuted the claims of the accident.

Filming of the three seasons of the series was taking place in one block. The filming of the first season concluded on 15 June and the second season began filming in the beginning of July. The filming of the second season concluded on 20 August and the crew started shooting for the third one immediately after which concluded on 4 October.
