= Acemi Cadı =

2005 Turkish comedy series

- Also known as: Beginner Witch
- Created by: Gülse Birsel
- Written by: Haluk Özenç
- Directed by: Feride Kaytan
- Starring: Merve Boluğur; Şenay Gürler; Nergis Kumbasar
- Country of origin: Turkey

Production
- Producer: D Productions
- Running time: 60 min.

Original release
- Network: Star TV
- Release: 2005 – 2007

Acemi Cadı is a Turkish comedy TV series produced by Star TV and largely based on the American series Sabrina the Teenage Witch.

== Plot ==
On her 16th birthday, Ayşegül discovers she is part of a witch family which includes her aunts Selda and Melda, that their cat Duman is her previously human uncle and how her father is communicating with her through a book.

Whilst living as a seemingly ordinary student, Ayşegül learns to control her powers and deal with a school life that gets mixed up by the popular and envious girl, Tuğçe. With her crazy friend Ceren, her secret crush Selim and her macho fan Toygar, she leads many adventures.

Selda cannot decide between her ex-lover Ferit and Principal Dilaver (Celal Kadri Kınoğlu in dual roles). Melda then falls in love with Dilaver and begins working at the school with him, a teacher and a basketball coach.

== Main cast ==
- Merve Boluğur (Ayşegül)
- Şenay Gürler (Selda)
- Nergis Kumbasar (Melda)
- Celal Kadri Kınoğlu (Principal Dilaver), (Damat Ferit)
- Çağkan Çulha (Selim)
- Dicle Alkan (Ceren)
- Levent Sülün (Hulki Hoca)
- Billur Yazgan (Tuğçe)
- Tuğçe Taşkıran (Berna)
- Gökdeniz Tüzün (Ebru)
- Cenk Gürpınar (Cenk)
- Haluk Levent Karataş (Murat)
- Hazal Kaya (Pelin)
