= Emre Törün =

Turkish actor (1972–2025)

Emre Alp Törün (1 March 1972 – 15 July 2025) was a Turkish actor and voice actor.

== Life and career ==
Törün was born in Istanbul on 1 March 1972. Throughout his career he appeared in films and television dramas, including Kara Melek, Çocuklar Duymasın, and Koçum Benim.

Törün died of pancreatic cancer in the Akçay neighbourhood of Edremit, on 15 July 2025, at the age of 53.

== Filmography ==
- Arka Sokaklar (2006) - Ayhan
- A Bandit Cannot Rule the World (2015-2017) - Nevzat Çankırı
- Arka Sokaklar (2020) - Civan
- Once Upon a Time in Cyprus (2021-2022) - Makarios III
- Testament: The Story of Moses (2024) - Dathan
