= Levent Ülgen =

Turkish actor (born 1962)

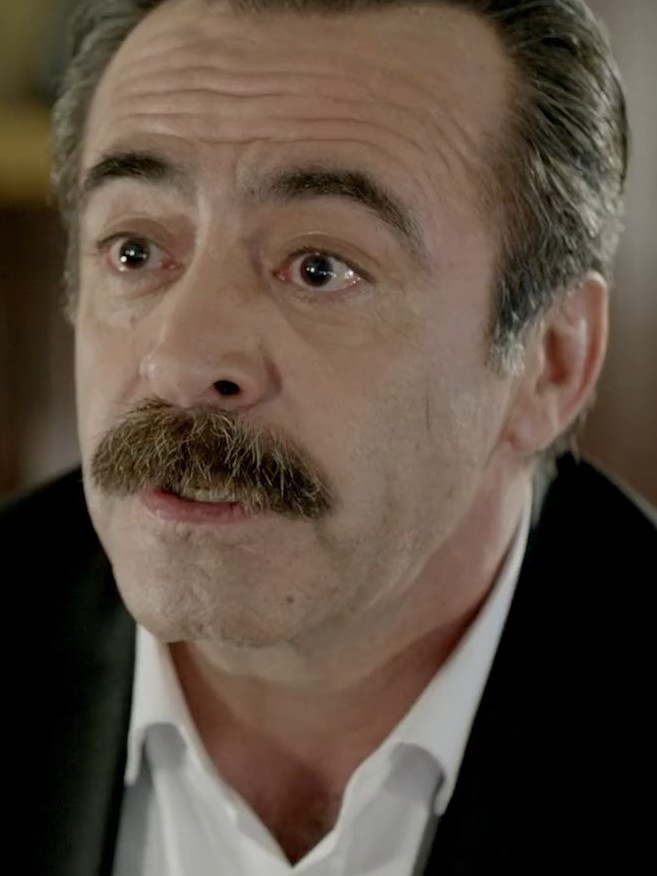
- Ülgen in 2017
- Born: Ömer Levent Ülgen; 8 August 1962 (age 62); Cihanbeyli, Turkey
- Education: Ankara İnönü High School; Middle East Technical University; Hacettepe University
- Occupation: Actor
- Years active: 1980–present
- Spouses: Tülay Bursa; Ziynet Şafak (m. 2014)
- Children: 1

Ömer Levent Ülgen (born 8 August 1962) is a Turkish film, television and stage actor.

== Career ==
Ülgen was educated at Ankara İnönü High School, METU School of Arts and Sciences, and then Hacettepe University Conservatory. He started his theatre career at Erkan Yücel's Ankara Public Theatre. He made his debut on stage as an extra in Atçalı Kel Mehmet and continued with different roles in various plays for both children and adult audiences.

After the death of Erkan Yücel, like many artists, he left the Ankara Folk Theatre and joined the Ankara Art Theater under the direction of Rutkay Aziz. While performing in various plays in this venue, he earned the right to study at Hacettepe University Conservatory, Theatre Department. After his graduation, he started to work as an actor and director at the State Theatres. During this period, he completed his master's degree.

He was known for his role as "the wicked groom Kadir" in the television series En Son Babalar Duyar, which was broadcast between 2002 and 2006. His character, and especially the line "Hallederiz" (lit. we'll figure it out), were well received by the public. Ülgen, who was married for a while to Tülay Bursa, a theatre artist like himself, continued his theatre and cinema studies in Ankara and Istanbul. He also presented a competition program called Bir Kelime Bir İşlem, which was broadcast on TRT1 for a while.

Ülgen, who is actively involved in the works of NGOs, voluntarily took part in adaptations of Nâzım Hikmet's plays, staged as by Yılmaz Onay at the Nâzım Hikmet Cultural Center. He played the character of "Sinan Kaya" in the TV series Akasya Durağı, which was broadcast on Kanal D and Star TV between 2008 and 2012. He played the character of "Chemist Sıfırcı Ziya" in the TV series Bizim Okul, which was broadcast on ATV in 2013. He rose to prominence again with the character of "Necmi İplikçi" in the TV series Kiralık Aşk, which was broadcast on Star TV between 2015 and 2017. Most recently, he acted alongside Ata Demirer in the movie Niyazi Gül Dörtnala.

Together with 226 names, including academics, artists, journalists, writers and lawyers, Ülgen is a signatory of the text read during the press release at the establishment of the Union of Socialist Forces, which was founded ahead of the 2023 Turkish general election.

== Theatre ==
=== As actor ===
- The Caucasian Chalk Circle : Bertolt Brecht - Sadri Alışık Theatre - 2013
- Yatak Odası Diyalogları : Birol Güven - Sadri Alışık Theatre - 2013
- İnsanlık Ölmedi Ya : Nâzım Hikmet - Okuma Theatre - 2010
- Yusuf ile Menofis : Nâzım Hikmet - Okuma Theatre - 2009
- İvan İvanoviç Var mıydı? Yok muydu? : Nâzım Hikmet - Okuma Theatre - 2008
- Yalancı Tanık : Nâzım Hikmet - Okuma Theatre - 2007
- Dalga : Reinhold Tritt - Donkişot Tiyatro - 2008
- Gözlerimi Kaparım Vazifemi Yaparım : Haldun Taner - Ankara State Theatre - 2005
- Altona Mahpusları : Jean-Paul Sartre - Ankara State Theatre - 2004
- Aykırı İkili : Neil Simon - Ankara State Theatre - 2003
- Ayrılık : Behiç Ak - Ankara State Theatre
- Crime and Punishment : Fyodor Dostoevsky - Ankara State Theatre - 2001
- Richard III : William Shakespeare - Ankara State Theatre - 2000
- Selim III : Celal Esad Arseven & Salah Cimcoz - Ankara State Theatre - 1999
- Blood Wedding : Federico García Lorca - Ankara State Theatre - 1997
- Murat IV : Turan Oflazoğlu - Ankara State Theatre - 1996
- Asiye Nasıl Kurtulur : Vasıf Öngören - Ankara State Theatre - 1994
- Yılın Kadını : Peter Stone - Ankara State Theatre - 1993
- Salpa : Yılmaz Güney - Ankara State Theatre - 1991
- Kuş : Ülker Köksal - Trabzon State Theatre - 1991
- Kamuoyu : Aurel Baranga - Trabzon State Theatre - 1989
- Yolcu : Nâzım Hikmet - Ankara Art Theatre
- Blood Wedding : Federico García Lorca
- An Enemy of the People : Henrik Ibsen - Ankara Art Theatre - 1985
- Bir Ceza Avukatının Anıları : Faruk Eren - Ankara Art Theatre - 1984
- Bir Şehnaz Oyun : Turgut Özakman - Ankara Art Theatre - 1984
- Taziye : Murathan Mungan - Ankara Art Theatre - 1983
- Yusuf ile Menofis : Nâzım Hikmet
- A Midsummer Night's Dream : William Shakespeare

=== As director ===
- TV Yıldızı Eva : Sylvia Freedman - Antalya State Theatre
- Can't Pay? Won't Pay! : Dario Fo - Ankara Art Theatre
- Tango : Sławomir Mrożek - Ankara Art Theatre - 2001

== Filmography ==
Television
Year	Title	Role
1999	Yılan Hikayesi	Mürekkep Kadir
2000	Bizim Evin Halleri	Nusret
2002–2006	En Son Babalar Duyar	Kadir
2002	Çocuklar Duymasın	Behçet
2003	Yuvadan Bir Kuş Uçtu	İbrahim
2003	Gelin	Veyis
2007	Hayat Apartmanı	Sadık
2007	Mahşer-Nabucco'nun Zehri	Ali Kılıç
2008	Görgüsüzler	Vakkas
2008–2012	Akasya Durağı	Sinan Kaya / Yusuf / Kasım / Yaman
2009	Arka Sokaklar	Şevket Hor
2013	Bizim Okul	Chemist Sıfırcı Ziya
2013	Salih Kuşu	Salih ve Bahtiyar
2013	İnadına Yaşamak	Kıbrıslı
2014–2015	Roman Havası	Haydar
2015–2017	Kiralık Aşk	Necmi İplikçi
2017	Aşk ve Gurur	Ahmet Esen
2017–2018	Hayati ve Diğerleri	Danyal Bezirci
2018	Kocaman Ailem	Hulusi Koyuncu
2019	Kuzgun	Rıfat Bilgin
2020	Gençliğim Eyvah	Zekeriya Bozoğlu
2021	Menajerimi Ara	Himself
2021	Eşkıya Dünyaya Hükümdar Olmaz	Efraim
2022	Baba	Hacı Selahattin
2023	Aile	İbrahim Soykan
2024	Kötü Kan	Burhan Karaoğlu
Film
Year	Title	Role
1992	Kurşun Adres Sormaz	Kemal
1993	Mavi Sürgün	Gendarmerie officer
1993	Gelincik Tarlası	Erol
1994	Kurtuluş	Albay Kenan Bey
1996	80. Adım	Korkut Laçin
1999	Köstebek Cüneyt	Cüneyt Verel
2000	Tutku Çemberi	Timur
2002	Keje	Bus driver
2002	Havada Bulut	Kabzımal Bayram
2007	Bayrampaşa: Ben Fazla Kalmayacağım	Tuncer
2009	Hayatın Tuzu	Şehsuvar
2010	Nene Hatun	Yavuz Hoca
2011	Devrimden Sonra	Socialist police
2014	Bizum Hoca	Kemal
2015	Niyazi Gül Dörtnala	Rıza
2015	Terkedilmiş	Zengin
2016	Araf 2	Araf
2016	Bir Şey Değilim	Çeto
2016	Kızkaçıran	Mehmet
2017	Her Şey Mümkün	İlyas
2019	Cep Herkülü: Naim Süleymanoğlu	Can Pulak
2024	Filme Gel	
Web
Year	Title	Role
2022–	Kaçış	Ebu Abidin
