= Ebru Destan =

Turkish singer, actress, and model

- Born: 24 September 1977 (age 48); İzmir, Turkey
- Occupations: Model, singer
- Years active: 1990–present
- Label: Seyhan Müzik
- Website: ebrudestan.com

Ebru Destan (born 24 September 1977) is a Turkish singer, actress, and model.

== Biography ==
Ebru is renowned as one of the top podium models in Turkey. In addition to her modeling career, she has showcased her talent in various films such as Abuzer Kadayıf, Yeni Hayat, Zor Hedef, and Can Ayşecik. Transitioning into the music industry in 2005, Ebru found success as a singer. She has three music albums called Sözümü Yemedim, Ayrılık Soğuk İklim and 3 Vakte Kadar. She competed in the reality show Survivor: Ünlüler vs. Gönüllüler as part of the Celebrities (Ünlüler) team. She reached the top 6, only to be voted out in an SMS head-to-head with her close friend Özge Ulusoy.

She dated Galatasaray S.K.'s former defender and Turkish international Vedat İnceefe for over three years and Beşiktaş J.K. defender İbrahim Toraman.

== Albums ==
- Sözümü Yemedim (2005)
- Ayrılık Soğuk İklim (2007)
- 3 Vakte Kadar (2008)

== Filmography ==
- Cennet'in Gözyaşları (2017–2018) Özlem
- Yahşi Cazibe (TV series) (2010) (Supporting character)
- Para=Dolar (2008)
- Teberik Şanssız (2005)
- Aliye (TV series) (2004) (Supporting character)
- Hayat Bilgisi (TV series) (2003) (Supporting character)
- Yeni Hayat (TV series) (2001)
- Aşkına Eşkıya (TV series) (2001)
- Abuzer Kadayıf (2000)
- Canlı Hayat (TV film) (2000)
- Zor Hedef (TV series) (2000)
- Onun Dünyası (2000)
- Kurt Kapanı (TV series) (2000)
- Kimsecikler (TV series) (1999)
- Ayşecik (TV series) (1999) (Mısra)
- Baba (TV series) (1999)
- Şampiyon (TV film) (1999)
- Hesabım Bitmedi (TV series) (1998)
- Unutabilsem (TV series) (1998)
- İlişkiler (TV series) (1997)
- Can Ayşecik (TV series) (1997)
- Bu Sevda Bitmez (TV series) (1996)
- Mahallenin Muhtarları (TV series) (1992)
