= Miray Akay =

Turkish actress (born 2000)

- Born: Myroslava Kosteva Akay; 17 July 2000 (age 25); Ukraine
- Occupation: Actress
- Years active: 2010–present

Miray Akay (born 17 July 2000) is a Ukrainian-Turkish actress. She is Turkish from her paternal side and Ukrainian from her maternal side of her family. She has appeared in a number of dramas in Turkey.

== Early life ==
Myroslava Kosteva Akay (Ukrainian: Мирослава Костева Акай) was born on 17 July 2000 in Ukraine to a Turkish father and a Ukrainian mother. She has an elder sister born in 1993, and a younger brother born in 2002. She had her primary and secondary education at Istanbul Bahçelievler Ali Haydar School. She graduated from theatre department of Mimar Sinan Fine Arts High School. She started acting at the age of three, working in various commercials and clips.

== Career ==
At the age of three, Akay started her acting career. She played in the TV series Bitmeyen Şarkı. Simultaneously, she acted in the comedy seriesTürk malı. In 2012, she joined the cast of Çıplak Gerçek and portrayed the character Selin. In the same year, she acted in the historical film Eve Dönüş: Sarıkamış 1915 and played the character of Nihan. In 2013, she played the character of Duru Halaskar in the series 20 Dakika. Simultaneously, she worked in two films: she played the role of Deniz in the film Balık, and in Halam Geldi she portrayed the character of Reyhan. In 2013, she depicted the character of Mediha's sister in the period film Kelebeğin Rüyası. The next year she depicted the character of Gülten in the period series Benim Adım Gültepe. In 2015, she portrayed the character of Peri Yılmaz in the youth series Güneşin Kızları along with actresses Burcu Özberk and Hande Erçel. In 2017, she appeared as Nazlı in the series Dayan Yüregim. In 2018, she played the character of Zeynep in the series Bizim Hikaye, which was broadcast on FOX. Also in 2018, she appeared in the series Servet. Currently, she stars in the historical series Bir Zamanlar Kıbrıs in which she portrays the character of Pembe. The story is set in the year 1963. From 2022 to 2023, she was portraying Alçiçek Hatun on Kuruluş Osman, which was broadcast by ATV.

== Personal life ==
Miray Akay dated Atilla Doğukan. The couple got engaged on 17 June 2019, however they broke up later in July.

== Filmography ==
Film
Year	Title	Role
2013	Kelebeğin Rüyası	Mediha's sister
2013	Eve Dönüş: Sarıkamış 1915	Nihan
2014	Halam Geldi	Reyhan
2014	Balık	Deniz
Television
Year	Title	Role
2010	Bitmeyen Şarkı	
2013	20 Dakika	Duru Halaskar
2014	Benim Adım Gültepe	Gülten
2015–2016	Güneşin Kızları	Peri Yılmaz
2017	Dayan Yüreğim	Nazlı
2017–2019	Bizim Hikaye	Zeynep Elibol
2020–2021	Zümrüdüanka	Meliha Kuloğlu
2021–2022	Bir Zamanlar Kıbrıs	Pembe Dereli
2022	Ah Nerede	Seray
2022–2023	Kuruluş Osman	Alçiçek Hatun
