= Doğukan Güngör =

Turkish actor (born 1996)

- Born: 1 July 1996 (age 30); Ankara, Turkey
- Education: Beykent University
- Occupation: Actor
- Years active: 2018–present

Doğukan Güngör (born 1 July 1996) is a Turkish actor. He became widely known for portraying the character Fatih Ünal in the series Kızılcık Şerbeti.

== Life and career ==
Güngör was born on 1 July 1996 in Ankara. He began his education in the Acting Department of Beykent University in 2017 and studied the Chubbuck method with actor and instructor Harika Uygur. As part of his stage work, he performed in both classical and modern drama productions; plays such as Othello, Bizim Köyün Adeti, and Hiç Kimsenin Öyküsü were included in his repertoire.

He began his television career with the series Meryem, which aired in 2018. He became known to a wider audience through his portrayal of Hamit in the series Zümrüdüanka, which aired in 2020. His recognition increased further following his role in that production. Between 2022 and 2026, he gained broader recognition for portraying the character Fatih in Kızılcık Şerbeti.

Güngör has also appeared in film projects, starring in Dilberay and Her Şeye Rağmen.

On 5 January 2026, he was detained as part of a drug investigation conducted in Istanbul. He was released on 7 January 2026. On 12 January 2026, information became public that he had admitted to using narcotics in his statement and stated that he would not use them again. Following the test results, Güngör was removed from the cast of Kızılcık Şerbeti on 23 January 2026. In a statement made on the same day, Güngör said that he had been removed from the series by decision of the Show TV management.

== Filmography ==
Television
Year	Title	Role	Network	Reference
2018	Meryem		Kanal D	
2020	Zümrüdüanka	Hamit Özgüç	Fox	
2022	Hakim	Asaf	ATV	
2022–2026	Kızılcık Şerbeti	Fatih Ünal	Show TV	
2026–	Haysiyet	Mehmet	Kanal D	
Film
Year	Title	Role	Director	Reference
2022	Dilberay	İbrahim	Ketche	
2023	Her Şeye Rağmen	Young Ayhan	Erdal Murat Aktaş	
2024	Sadık Ahmet	Expat	Hakan Yonat	
2024	Zaferin Rengi		Abdullah Oğuz	

== Theatre ==
Theatre
Year	Title	Role	Venue	Task
	Hiç Kimsenin Öyküsü		Beykent University	Actor
	Othello		Beykent University	Actor
	Bizim Köyün Adeti		Beykent University	Actor

== Awards and nominations ==
Awards and nominations
Year	Award	Category	Project	Result	Reference
2024	10th TV Stars “Ayaklı Gazete” Awards	Best Actor	Kızılcık Şerbeti	Won	
