= Altın Kafes =

- Genre: Drama
- Based on: The Last Empress by Kim Soon-ok
- Written by: Rahşan Çiğdem İnan
- Directed by: Cem Akyoldaş
- Starring: Aytaç Şaşmaz; Şifanur Gül
- Composer: Jingle TV
- Country of origin: Turkey
- Original language: Turkish
- No. of seasons: 1
- No. of episodes: 5

Production
- Producer: Fatih Enes Ömeroğlu
- Production location: Istanbul
- Running time: 145 minutes
- Production company: ARC Film

Original release
- Network: atv
- Release: 3 December – 31 December 2023

Altın Kafes is a Turkish television series in the romantic and drama genres, produced by ARC Film, with the first episode airing on December 3, 2023. The series is directed by Cem Akyoldaş and written by Rahşan Çiğdem İnan. It is an adaptation of the 2018 South Korean production, The Last Empress. The main featured stars are Aytaç Şaşmaz and Şifanur Gül.

== Plot ==
Zeynep works as a teacher at the school of the wealthy Beyoğlu family, one of the country's few affluent families. Due to her sister Berna studying with a scholarship provided by the family, Zeynep feels indebted to them. She also volunteers at the Beyoğlu Foundation. A chain of events is triggered when she prevents an assassination attempt on Onur Beyoğlu, the heir to the Beyoğlu family, during an organization of the foundation. These events bring her closer to this charismatic man and eventually lead them to the wedding altar. Onur, who has shown no interest in any woman since his wife's death, surprises everyone with his marriage to Zeynep. Onur is impressed by Zeynep's uniqueness and genuine behavior, but there are significant secrets about Onur and his family that Zeynep is unaware of. In this house where everyone is connected by the pains of the past, nothing is as it seems. Zeynep and Onur will have to struggle for their love in this house that turns into a golden cage.

== Cast and characters ==
Actor	Character
Aytaç Şaşmaz	Onur Beyoğlu
Şifanur Gül	Zeynep Özcan
Ebru Cündübeyoğlu	Nalan Beyoğlu
Hayal Köseoğlu	Ahu Karataş
Hilmi Cem İntepe	Serhat Gediz
Sacide Taşaner	Zümrüt Beyoğlu
Murat Kılıç	Ayhan Özcan
Kaan Turgut	Kenan Parlak
Sümeyra Koç	Alara Beyoğlu
Eda Nur Gülbudak	Berna Özcan
Tarık Uğur Özenbaş	Kaya Seyitlioğlu
Buse Orcan	Şeniz Kalpak
Gurur Çiçekoğlu	Hikmet Atay
Cansu Mumcu	Şule Deniz
Ali Kayra Kul	Kaan Beyoğlu
Aksel Yılmaz	Alper
Zeki Eker	School Principal

== Episodes ==
=== Overview ===
Series	Episodes	Originally released	
Series	Episodes	First released	Last released
1	1	3 December 2023	17 December 2023

=== List of episodes ===
No.	Title	Directed by	Written by	Original release date
1	TBA	Cem Akyoldaş	Rahşan Çiğdem İnan	3 December 2023
2	TBA	Unknown	Unknown	10 December 2023
3	TBA	Unknown	Unknown	17 December 2023

== Rating ==
=== Season 1 (2023-) ===
Episodes Ratings
Episode	Rating (TOTAL)	Rank (TOTAL)	Rating (AB)	Rank (AB)	Rating (ABC1)	Rank (ABC1)
Episode 1	2.41	14.	1.19	23.	1.86	20.
Episode 2	-	-	-	-	-	-
Episode 3	-	-	-	-	-	-

== Release ==
Altın Kafes premiered on 3 December 2023 on ATV.

== See also ==
- Television in Turkey
- List of Turkish television series
- Turkish television drama
