= Salih Bademci =

Turkish actor (born 1984)

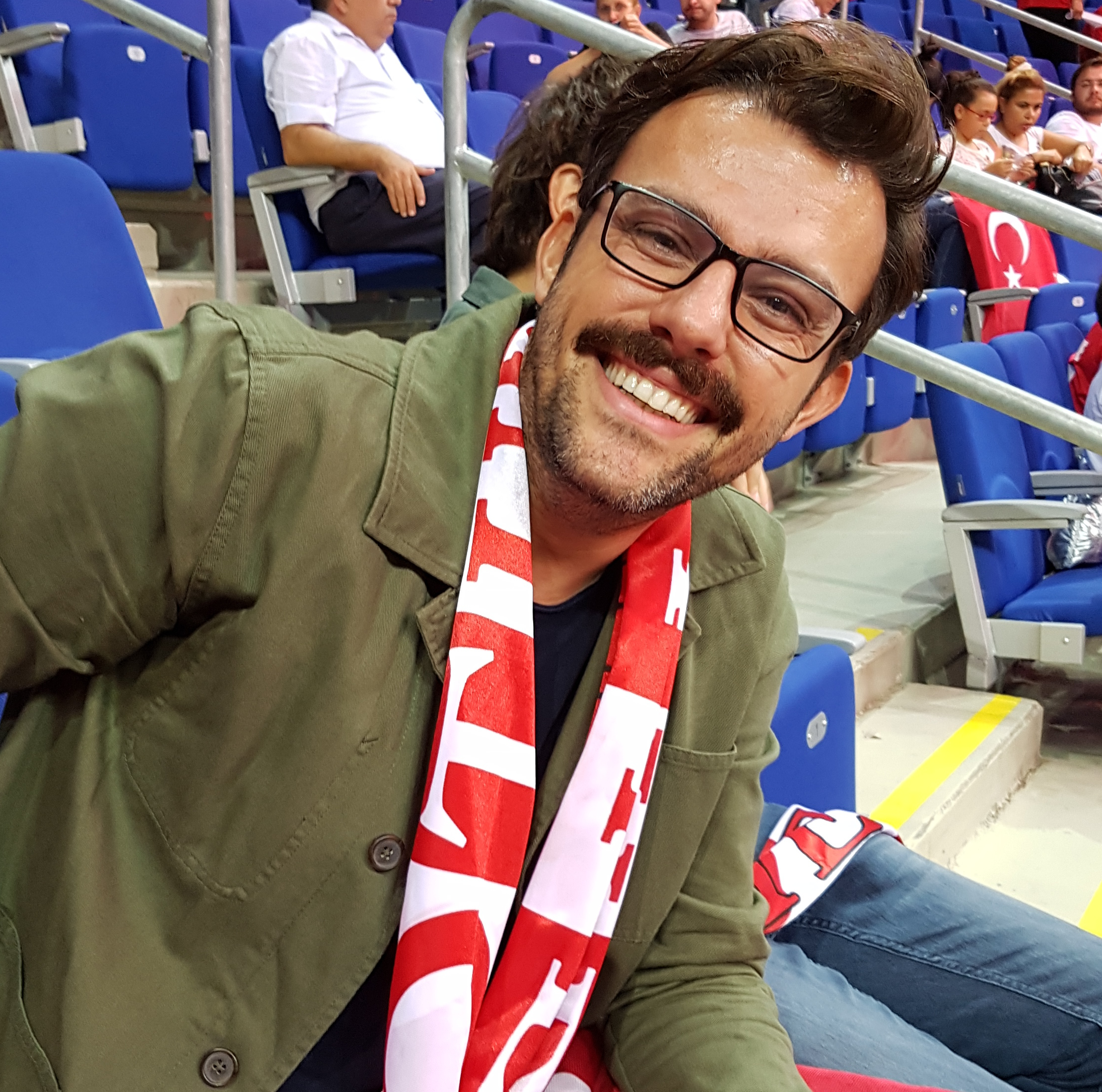
- Bademci in 2017
- Born: 15 August 1984 (age 42); Ankara, Turkey
- Occupation: Actor
- Years active: 1994–present
- Spouse: İmer Özgün (m. 2015)
- Children: 1

Salih Bademci (born 15 August 1984) is a Turkish actor.

Bademci is a graduate of Bornova Anatolian High School. After appearing in a minor role in 1994, he made his main debut with Serdar Akar's movie Barda and then appeared in his first role on television with the hit period series Elveda Rumeli. His other period series are "Öyle Bir Geçer Zaman Ki", "Fatih", "Kulüp". In 2014, he was cast in Kanal D series Zeytin Tepesi as Akın, in the same year joined the cast of popular comedy crime series Ulan İstanbul, portraying the character of Ceyhun. In 2015, he was further noted by the audience with his role in Star TV romantic comedy series Kiralık Aşk, in which he played the character of Sinan Karakaya. He also had a leading role in İstanbullu Gelin, which was broadcast between 2017 and 2019.

== Theatre ==
- Big Shoot: Koffi Kwahulé - Tiyatrops - 2014–2015
- The Effect: Lucy Prebble - Siyah Beyaz ve Renkli - 2014–2015
- Oriental Dentist : Hagop Baronian - Istanbul City Theatre - 2011
- Fireface: Marius von Mayenburg - Siyah Beyaz ve Renkli - 2010
- The Miser: Molière - Kent Oyuncuları - 2009

== Filmography ==
Film
Year	Title	Role	Notes
1994	Mıymıntılar Kralı		Guest appearance
2006	Barda	Cenk	Supporting role
2014	Arkadaşlar Arasında	Barış	Leading role
2015	Köpek	Hakan	Supporting role
Streaming series
Year	Title	Role	Notes
2021	İlk ve Son	Barış	Leading role
2021–2022	Kulüp	Selim Songür	Leading role
2023–	Terzi	Dimitri	Leading role
Television series
Year	Title	Role	Notes
2007–2009	Elveda Rumeli	Muzaffer	Supporting role
2010–2013	Öyle Bir Geçer Zaman ki	Hakan Tatlı	Supporting role
2013	Fatih	Şehzade Bayezid	Supporting role
2014	Zeytin Tepesi	Akın Karatay	Supporting role
2014	Ulan İstanbul	Ceyhun	Supporting role
2015–2017	Kiralık Aşk	Sinan Karakaya	Leading role
2017–2019	İstanbullu Gelin	Fikret Boran	Leading role
2020	Kırmızı Oda	Mehmet	Guest appearance
2021	Yalancı	Mehmet Emir	Leading role
2023	Dilek Taşı	Mustafa Yılmaz	Leading role

== Awards ==
Year	Award	Category	Project	Source	Result
2015	20th Sadri Alışık Theatre and Cinema Awards	Selection Committee's Special Award (The Effect)	Tesir (play)		Won
2016	2nd Turkey Youth Awards	Best Supporting Actor	Kiralık Aşk		Won
2021	GQ Men of the Year 2021	Actor of the Year			Won
2023	49th Golden Butterfly Awards	Best Actor	Dilek Taşı, The Club, The Tailor		Won
2023	13th ITU Social Media Awards	Best Actor			Won
