= Barış Kılıç =

Turkish actor (born 1978)

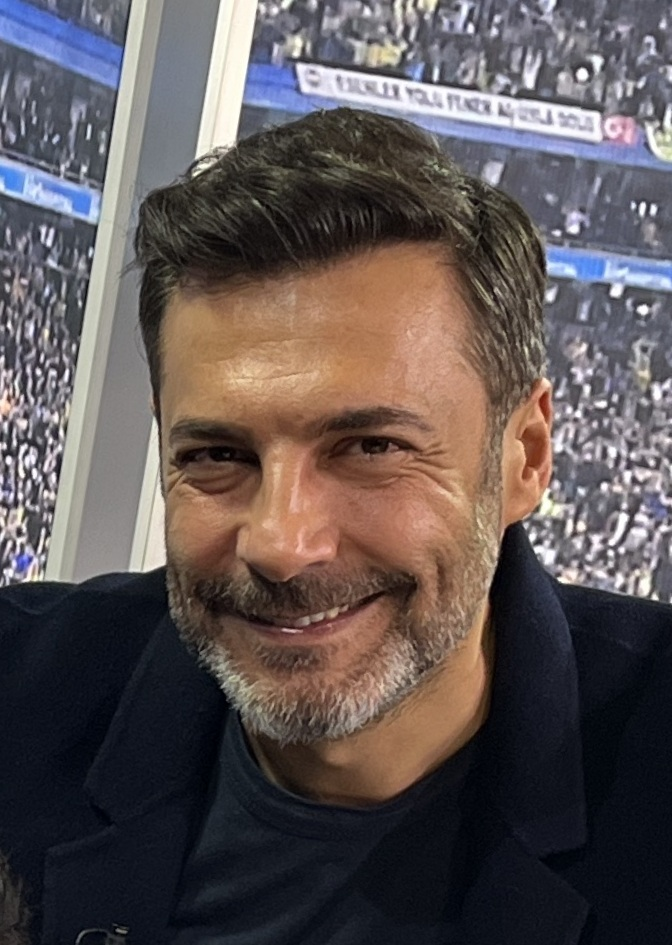
- Born: February 21, 1978 (age 48); Arguvan, Malatya, Turkey
- Occupation: Actor
- Years active: 2004–present
- Height: 1.88 m (6 ft 2 in)
- Spouse: Ayşegül Kılıç (m. 2007)
- Children: 2

Barış Kılıç (born February 21, 1978) is a Turkish actor.

== Life and career ==
Barış Kılıç was born on June 22, 1978 in the town of Arguvan in Malatya Province. His family moved to Istanbul when he was 5. After studying at Okmeydanı Anadolu High School, he graduated from Istanbul University School of Economics. He then briefly lived in the United States before returning to Turkey and receiving his master's degree from Yeditepe University. While in university he acted in commercials. He made his television debut in 2004 with a role in Bütün Çocuklarım, acting alongside Kadir İnanır and Menderes Samancılar. He married Ayşegül in 2007, with whom he has two sons. In 2011, he portrayed the character Levent in Adını Feriha Koydum. In 2014, he joined the cast of Güllerin Savaşı and shared the leading role with Canan Ergüder and Damla Sönmez. He made his cinematic debut in 2014 in Biray Dalkıran's movie Seni Seviyorum Adamım. He further rose to prominence with his role in Yasak Elma.

== Filmography ==
TV series
Year	Title	Role	Notes
2024	O Ses Türkiye Yılbaşı Özel	Himself	Guest
2022–	Kızılcık Şerbeti	Ömer	Leading role
2022	Evlilik Hakkında Her Şey	Efe Avcı	Leading role
2021	Uzak Şehrin Masalı	Kürşat	Leading role
2019–2021	Yasak Elma	Kaya Ekinci	Leading role
2017	Evlat Kokusu	Aslan Akbaş	Leading role
2016	Oyunbozan	Emre	Leading role
2014–2016	Güllerin Savaşı	Ömer Hekimoğlu	Leading role
2012–2013	Merhaba Hayat	Burak	Supporting role
2011–2012	Adını Feriha Koydum	Levent Seymen	Supporting role
2009-2011	Sakarya Fırat	Berat Tekintaş	Supporting role
2009	Aynadaki Düşman	Kaan Candemir	Supporting role
2007	Leylan	Yaman	Supporting role
2007	Vazgeç Gönlüm	Mert	Supporting role
2004	Bütün Çocuklarım	Aybars	Supporting role

Film
Year	Title	Role	Notes
2014	Seni Seviyorum Adamım	Berk	Leading role
