= Nergis Kumbasar =

Turkish model and actress

- Born: 25 May 1963 (age 63); Ankara, Turkey
- Education: TED Ankara College Foundation Schools; Gazi University Faculty of Economics and Administrative Sciences (left)
- Occupations: Model, actress, TV presenter, scenarist
- Years active: 1985–present
- Spouse: Mehmet Ali Erbil (m. 1989; div. 1996)
- Children: 1

Nergis Kumbasar (born 25 May 1963) is a Turkish model, actress, TV presenter and scenarist.

== Life ==
Nergis Kumbasar was born on 25 May 1963 in Ankara. She is from İkizdere. Her father Abidin Kumbasar (b. 1932), the son of a family from Rize, is a professor of internal medicine and cardiology. Kumbasar has a younger brother named Deniz. From her father's second marriage to Canan Kumbasar, she has a half-brother named Genco Güralp.

Kumbasar completed her kindergarten in the United States because of her father's studies and works in the country. While attending TED Ankara College Foundation Schools, she was sent to a modeling and grace school by her mother. Then she left her studies in economics at the Ankara Academy of Economics and Commercial Sciences unfinished and began modeling in Istanbul. She would describe this decision as "my greatest regret" in the years to come. She played in many commercials during that period. She made her acting debut in 1985 with the role of Nüzhet on TRT's series Dokuzuncu Hariciye Koğuşu. She also started to work as a TV presenter in the 1980s.

In 1989, Kumbasar married Turkish actor and showman Mehmet Ali Erbil. In 1995, she gave birth to the couple's daughter Yasmin. They divorced in 1996. In 2000, she returned to television with the role of Berna on the TV series Eyvah Kızım Büyüdü. She was involved in various productions in the following years. In 2007, she made her debut as a scriptwriter with the TV series Evimin Erkeği. She later appeared in the fantasy series Acemi Cadı (Turkish version of Sabrina the Teenage Witch) and portrayed the character of Neriman on the popular TV series Kiralık Aşk.

== Filmography ==
=== As actress ===
Film
Year	Title	Role	Notes
1989	Sevmek ve Ölmek Zamanı	Aysun	
2002	Muhteris Ruhlar	Rüstem's cousin	
2013	Neva	Ilgın's mother	
2019	Çat Kapı Aşk	Ayten	
2022	Masal Zamanı: Melez Prenses	Sihirli Ayna	
2023	Masal Zamanı: Sihirli Kapı	Sihirli Ayna	
2024	Biricik Sevgilim	Güner	
2025	Kutsal Damacana: Zombi	Kader	
Television
Year	Title	Role	Network
1986	Dokuzuncu Hariciye Koğuşu	Nüzhet	TRT 1
2000–2001	Eyvah Kızım Büyüdü	Berna	Kanal D
2004	Tam Pansiyon	Şermin	Kanal D
2005	Çapkın	Kevser	Show TV
2006–2007	Acemi Cadı	Melda	Kanal D / Star TV
2009–2011	Papatyam	Semiha	Star TV
2015-2017	Kiralık Aşk	Neriman İplikçi	Star TV
2017	Türk Malı	Şaduman Sümbül	Star TV
2018	Darısı Başımıza	Canan Tekinsoy	Show TV
2020	İyi Günde Kötü Günde	Perihan	Star TV
2022	Seversin	Suzan Tuna	Kanal D
2023	Benim Güzel Ailem	Feryal İlhan	TRT 1
2024	Karadut	Yüksel	atv
2026	Tuzlu Kahve	Tiraje Kutaygil	Star TV
Streaming series
Year	Title	Role	Platform
2021–2022	Sihirli Annem	Perihan	Exxen
2022	Sadece Arkadaşız	Hala	Exxen
2023	Organizasyon Bizim İşimiz	Perihan	tabii

Commercials

- Lipton (2016)
- Signal (2016)

=== As scenarist ===
Television

- Evimin Erkeği (2007)
- Sardunya Sokağı (2007)

=== As presenter ===
Television

- Yeniden Başlasın (2008)
- Nergis Zamanı (2018–19)
