= Gönül Dağı =

- Genre: Comedy drama; Family drama
- Based on: Mustafa Çiftçi'nin hikâyelerinden
- Written by: Ali Asaf Elmas (1-); Mustafa Becit (1-); Teoman Gök (6-)
- Directed by: Yahya Samancı
- Creative director: Ahmet Teke
- Starring: Berk Atan; Gülsim Ali; Ecem Özkaya; Ferdi Sancar; Ali Düşenkalkar; Erdal Cindoruk; Ege Aydan; Erdal Özyağcılar; Ulviye Karaca
- Country of origin: Turkey
- Original language: Turkish
- No. of seasons: 7
- No. of episodes: 232

Production
- Producer: Ferhat Eşsiz
- Running time: 150 minutes
- Production company: Köprü Film

Original release
- Network: TRT1
- Release: October 17, 2020 – present

Gönül Dağı ("Mountain of Hearts") is a 2020 Turkish comedy-drama series directed by Yahya Samancı. The series premiered on TRT 1 on October 17, 2020. It is based on the motives of Mustafa Çiftçi's unpublished stories. Berk Atan and Gülsim Ali play the leading roles in the series.

== Plot ==
Taner, Ramazan and Veysel are 3 cousins. They live in Gedelli. There is a mountain in the town of Gedelli. It is called "Mountain of Hearts". Here, whoever suffers from love, a rock rolls and falls from that mountain.

Taner's father died quickly. The fathers of Ramazan and Veysel, on the other hand, complain to each other about a subject they do not know or forget, and the aunts talk to each other secretly. The cousins decide to build a plane. That's when Taner calls in aircraft engineers. However, aircraft engineers remain on the road. They think that the first geological engineers they see are aircraft engineers and bring them to the settlement. However, then it turns out that the engineers are not that engineer. At this time, Taner finds Dilek as a geological engineer. This event, which took place a few years later, is followed by other events. In the ongoing parts of the series, the lives of the people of Gedelli are told.

== Cast ==
- Director: Yahya Samancı
- Author of the work: Mustafa Çiftçi
- Scriptwriter: Ali Asaf Elmas, Mustafa Becit
- Producer: Ferhat Eşsiz
- Berk Atan - Taner Kaya: A boy who is love with Dilek.
- Gülsim Ali - Dilek: A girl who realizes that she is in love with Taner.
- Ecem Özkaya - Zahide Kaya: Taner's elder sister. Sefer's love interest.
- Ferdi Sancar - Dolmuşçu Sefer: A bus driver who loves Zahide.
- Ali Düşenkalkar - Muammer Kaya: Taner's uncle. A man who also arranges weddings.
- Erdal Cindoruk - Hüseyin Kaya: Taner's uncle. A man who also arranges funerals.
- Gülhan Tekin - Günşıl Kaya: Hüseyin's wife. Ramazan's mother.
- Feyza Işık - Döndü Kaya: Muammer's wife. Veysel's mother. Cemile's mother-in-law.
- Ege Aydan - Münir Başkan: Asuman's father.
- Eser Eyüboğlu - Selami Ferses: A singer. Keriman's love interest.
- Cihat Süvarioğlu - Ramazan Kaya: Taner's cousin. Asuman's love interest.
- Hazal Çağlar - Asuman: Münir Başkan's daughter. Ramazan's love interest.
- Semih Ertürk - Veysel Kaya: Taner's cousin. Cemile's husband.
- Nazlı Pınar Kaya - Cemile Kaya: Veysel's wife.
- Şebnem Dilligil - Halime Kaya: Taner and Zahide's mother.
- Yavuz Sepetçi - Ciritçi Abdullah: Taner, Veysel and Ramazan's grandfather. Muammer and Hüseyin's father.
- Nuri Gökaşan - Dişçi Musa: Cemile's father.
- Hüseyin Sevimli - Rıfat: A man who works at a coffee shop.
- Erdal Özyağcılar - Süleyman
- Hüseyin Soysalan - İrfan
- Tuna Orhan - Kahraman
- Çiğdem Aygün - Keriman: Selami's wife.
- Cemre Melis Çınar - Fadime: Musa's daughter. Cemile's sister.
- Utku Ateş - Serdar: Dilek's ex fiancé.
- Serkan Kuru - Kenan Kaya: Doctor. Döndü’s and Muammer’s son. Veysel’s elder brother. Elif’s husband.
- Zümre Meğreli - Elif: Nurse. Kenan’s wife.
- Güliz Aybey - Zeynep: Elif's sister.
- Faruk Karagül - Yaşar: Sennur’s husband.
- Ulviye Karaca - Gülsüm Öğretmen: Dilek's mother.
- Ruhi Sarı - Fikret: Zahide's ex-husband.
