= Mehmet Ali Erbil =

Turkish actor

- Born: 8 February 1957 (age 69); Istanbul, Turkey
- Education: Hacettepe University Ankara State Conservatory
- Occupations: Actor, comedian, talk show host
- Years active: 1970–present
- Height: 1.73 m (5 ft 8 in)
- Spouse(s): Muhsine Şehnaz Kamiloğlu (m. 1980; div. 1982) (m. 1985; div. 1986) Nergis Kumbasar (m. 1989; div. 1996) Sedef Altuntaş (m. 2001; div. 2003) Tuğba Coşkun (m. 2005; div. 2011) Gülseren Ceylan (m. 2025; div. 2026)
- Children: 3

Mehmet Ali Erbil (born 8 February 1957) is a Turkish actor, comedian and talk show host.

== Biography ==
Mehmet Ali was born in Istanbul, Turkey, as the son of Sadettin Erbil, a theatre and film actor, in 1957. He is the grandson of Mehmed Efendi and maternally the great-grandson of Mehmed Esad Erbilî of Kurdish origin.

He completed his primary and secondary education in Istanbul, Ankara and Balıkesir. In 1970, he enrolled in the Theatre Department of State Conservatory in Ankara. Having graduated, he started his acting career in Ankara State Theatre. Afterwards, he moved to Istanbul and continued his career in musical films. In 1984, he first started his television career in a programme he hosted together with Derya Baykal and Çiğdem Tunç.

He currently suffers from a rare disease called capillary leak syndrome.

His TV show Çarkıfelek (Turkey's version of Wheel of Fortune) was cancelled on 6 October 2010 due to Erbil's derogatory reference to Alevis. The program started again in September 2011 on TNT.

Erbil is also the Turkish voice of Sheriff Woody from the Toy Story franchise.

In March 2023, a court sentenced him to a judicial fine of ₺13,100 for "insult" and to 4 months and 15 days in prison for "sexual harassment" of Ece Ronay Bilir.

== Filmography ==
Actor

- "Harakiri" (1975)
- "Şıpsevdi" (1977) TV series
- "Aşk Dediğin Laftır" (1977)
- "Hababam Sınıfı Güle Güle" (1981)
- "Hülya" (1988)
- "Bay E" (1995)
- "Tatlı Kaçıklar" (1996)
- "Kahpe Bizans" (1999)
- "Aşkım Aşkım" (2001) TV series
- "Hemşo" (2001)
- "Hastayım Doktor" (2002) TV series
- "En Son Babalar Duyar" (2002) TV series
- "Büyümüş de Küçülmüş" (2003) TV series
- "Ömerçip" (2002)
- "Teberik Şanssız" (2004)
- "Hababam Sınıfı Merhaba" (2004)
- "Hababam Sınıfı Askerde" (2004)
- "Hırsız Var" (2005)
- "Hababam Sınıfı 3,5" (2005)
- "Keloğlan Kara Prens'e Karşı" (2006)
- "Dünyayı Kurtaran Adamın Oğlu" (2006)
- "Emret Komutanım: Şah Mat" (2007)
- "Yıldızlar Savaşı" (2007)

== See also ==
- Cinema of Turkey

== Sources ==
- Sinemateknik.com – Biography of Mehmet Ali Erbil (in Turkish)
