= Şifanur Gül =

Turkish actress (born 1997)

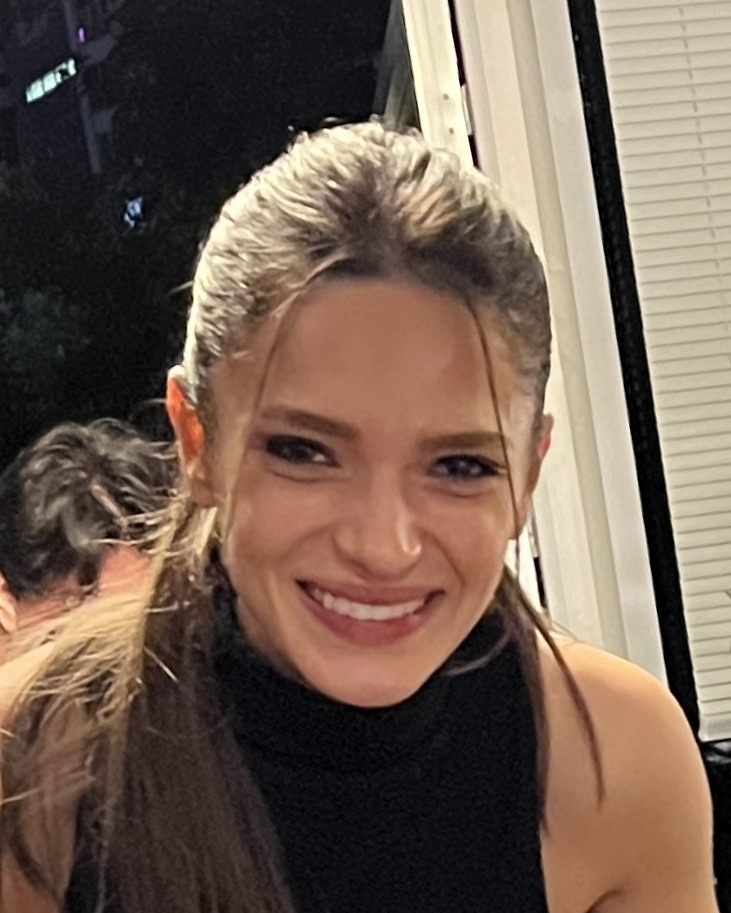
- Gül in 2023
- Born: 26 November 1997 (age 28); Ankara, Turkey
- Education: Ankara University
- Occupation: Actress
- Years active: 2019–present

Şifanur Gül (born 26 November 1997) is a Turkish actress.

== Biography ==
Born in 1997 in Ankara, Şifanur Gül began studying acting at the age of eighteen and completed her education at the DTCF Drama Department of Ankara University. In 2019 and 2020, she made her first appearance on the small screen with the role of Eylül in the television series Sevdim Seni Bir Kere. In 2020, she was cast in the series Uyanış: Büyük Selçuklu, playing the role of Gülperi Hatun. This was followed in 2021 by roles in the series Benim Adım Melek (as İkra Ayşe Meriç), Cam Tavanlar (as Suna) and Kırmızı Oda (as Genç Firuzan).

In 2022 and 2023, she played the role of Yonca Sıdalı in the series Hayatımın Şansı, followed by the role of Güliz Tümer in the series Kus Uçusu from 2022 to 2024. In 2023, she played the role of Zeynep Özcan in the series Altın Kafes, the role of Esvet / Firuze in the series The Tailor (Terzi), the role of Feride in the series Akif and the role of Asiye in the series Yaratılan. In the same year, she took part in the TV show O Ses Türkiye Yılbaşı Özel broadcast on TV8. In 2024 she made her film debut with the role of Nükhet in the film Bir Cumhuriyet Şarkısı directed by Yağız Alp Akaydın. In 2025 she filmed scenes for the series Ölüm Kime Yakışır.

== Filmography ==
=== Film ===
Year	Title	Role	Director
2024	Bir Cumhuriyet Şarkısı	Nükhet	Yağız Alp Akaydın

=== Television ===
Year	Title	Role	Network	Notes
2019–2020	Sevdim Seni Bir Kere	Eylül	Star TV	30 episodes
2020	Uyanış: Büyük Selçuklu	Gülperi Hatun	TRT 1	9 episodes
2021	Benim Adım Melek	İkra Ayşe Meriç	TRT 1	16 episodes
2021	Cam Tavanlar	Suna	Show TV	8 episodes
2021	Kırmızı Oda	Genç Firuzan	TV8	9 episodes
2022–2023	Hayatımın Şansı	Yonca Sıdalı	Fox	9 episodes
2023	Altın Kafes	Zeynep Özcan	ATV	5 episodes

=== Web series ===
Year	Title	Role	Platform	Notes
2022–2024	Kus Uçusu	Güliz Tümer	Netflix	18 episodes
2023	Terzi	Esvet / Firuze	Netflix	23 episodes
2023	Akif	Feride	tabii	13 episodes
2023	Yaratılan	Asiye	Netflix	8 episodes
2026	Sumud	Melisa Sword	tabii	
TBD	Ölüm Kime Yakışır		Turkcell TV+	? episodes

== Television programs ==
Year	Title	Network	Notes
2023	O Ses Türkiye Yılbaşı Özel	TV8	Guest star

== Awards ==
Year	Award	Category	Result	Notes
2020	GQ Turkey Award	Breakout Actress of the Year	Won	
