= Kızılcık Şerbeti =

- Genre: Drama
- Country of origin: Turkey
- Original language: Turkish
- No. of seasons: 5
- No. of episodes: 147

Production
- Producer: Faruk Turgut
- Production company: Gold Film

Original release
- Network: Show TV
- Release: 28 October 2022 – present

Kızılcık Şerbeti (international title: Cranberry Sorbet) is a Turkish television drama series produced by Gold Film for Show TV. It premiered on 28 October 2022. The series follows two families with contrasting religious and cultural backgrounds whose lives become intertwined through the marriage of their children, Doğa and Fatih.

The series was originally written by Melis Civelek and directed by Hakan Kırvavaç, professionally known as Ketche. Its original principal cast included Barış Kılıç, Evrim Alasya, Settar Tanrıöğen, Sıla Türkoğlu, Sibel Taşçıoğlu, Doğukan Güngör and Müjde Uzman.

== Plot ==
The story centres on Kıvılcım Arslan, a divorced school principal who has raised her daughters, Doğa and Çimen, according to her secular and progressive values. Her expectations for Doğa's future are challenged when her daughter, a university student studying dentistry, decides to marry her boyfriend Fatih Ünal.

Fatih comes from a wealthy, religiously conservative family whose traditions and lifestyle differ considerably from those of Kıvılcım's family. The marriage brings the two families together, leading to conflicts over religious beliefs, cultural expectations, family relationships and the roles of women in society.

== Cast and characters ==
The original principal cast included:

- Evrim Alasya as Kıvılcım Arslan
- Barış Kılıç as Ömer Ünal
- Sıla Türkoğlu as Doğa Korkmaz
- Doğukan Güngör as Fatih Ünal
- Settar Tanrıöğen as Abdullah Ünal
- Sibel Taşçıoğlu as Pembe Ünal
- Müjde Uzman as Alev Arslan
- Ceren Yalazoğlu Karakoç as Nursema Ünal
- Feyza Civelek as Nilay Ünal
- Emrah Altıntoprak as Mustafa Ünal
- Aliye Uzunatağan as Sönmez Arslan
- Selin Türkmen as Çimen Arslan

The cast underwent several changes over the course of the series. Ahmet Mümtaz Taylan took over the role of Abdullah Ünal, originally portrayed by Settar Tanrıöğen. By the fifth season, the principal cast included Barış Kılıç, Evrim Alasya, Ahmet Mümtaz Taylan, Seray Kaya, Erkan Avcı, Özge Borak, Emre Dinler and Murat Aygen. The fifth season introduced additional characters and storylines following developments at the end of the fourth season.

== Production ==
Kızılcık Şerbeti was developed for Show TV by the production company Gold Film, with Faruk Turgut serving as producer. The original screenplay was written by Melis Civelek, and the series was initially directed by Hakan Kırvavaç, known professionally as Ketche. Production began in Istanbul in September 2022, ahead of the series premiere on 28 October 2022.

== Broadcast ==
Kızılcık Şerbeti premiered on Show TV on 28 October 2022. The series has been broadcast on Friday evenings, with new seasons generally beginning in September following a summer hiatus. Its fifth season premiered on 18 September 2026.

Season	Episodes	First aired	Last aired	Episode range
1	29	28 October 2022	9 June 2023	1–29
2	37	15 September 2023	7 June 2024	30–66
3	37	13 September 2024	30 May 2025	67–103
4	35	12 September 2025	22 May 2026	104–138
5	TBA	18 September 2026	Present	139 onwards
