= Kiralık Aşk =

Turkish romantic drama television series

- Genre: Romantic comedy
- Written by: Meriç Acemi
- Directed by: Metin Balekoğlu (1–20); Barış Yöş (21–43); Şenol Sönmez (44–69)
- Starring: Barış Arduç; Elçin Sangu; Salih Bademci; Müjde Uzman; Seçkin Özdemir; Onur Büyüktopçu; Ferdi Merter; Nergis Kumbasar; Levent Ülgen
- Opening theme: "Kiralık Aşk" by Aydilge
- Composers: Alpay Göktekin; Zeynep Alasya
- Country of origin: Turkey
- Original language: Turkish
- No. of seasons: 2
- No. of episodes: 69

Production
- Executive producer: Salih Karaman
- Producers: Müge Turalı Pak; Yelda Perahya Yalçın; Mehmetcan Yüksel
- Production locations: Istanbul, Turkey
- Cinematography: Ugur Kul
- Editors: Aykut Yıldırım; Ali Kadi
- Camera setup: Single-camera
- Running time: 120 minutes
- Production company: Ortaks Yapım

Original release
- Network: Star TV
- Release: June 19, 2015 – January 20, 2017

Kiralık Aşk (English: Love for Rent) is a Turkish romantic drama television series, starring Barış Arduç, Elçin Sangu, Salih Bademci, Sinem Öztürk, Nergis Kumbasar, and Levent Ülgen. It comprises two seasons, premiering on Star TV on June 19, 2015 with the final episode airing January 20, 2017.

== Plot ==
=== Season 1 ===
A waitress named Defne Topal (Elçin Sangu) finds herself in a love game when she urgently needs a large sum of money to pay off her brother's debt. Defne looks after her grandmother, her young sister, and her older brother. Her father died when Defne and her siblings were very young, after which their mother left to start life anew with another man. One day, a man named Ömer İplikçi (Barış Arduç) kisses her abruptly outside the restaurant where Defne works to save himself from a blind date arranged by his aunt. Unknown to Defne and Ömer, Ömer's aunt, Neriman (Nergis Kumbasar), witnesses the kiss. After that, Neriman approaches Defne with an offer to marry and then leave the man she's renting her for, her husband's nephew Ömer. Neriman is ready to give 400,000 liras, but Defne only takes the money she needs (200,000 liras) and accepts the offer to free her brother from the people he is indebted to.

Neriman is desperate to find a girl for Ömer in order to please her father-in-law and Ömer's estranged grandfather, Hulusi İplikçi ([Ferdi Merter). Hulusi has threatened Neriman and her husband, Necmi (Levent Ülgen), that unless he sees Ömer married in the next 6 months, he will sell all the family property, including Necmi and Neriman's house. Under Neriman's instructions, Defne begins work at Ömer İplikçi's shoe business as his personal assistant, unaware of the fact that he is the man who had forcefully kissed her until she sees him on her first day of work. She has 6 months to make Ömer fall in love with her, marry him, and then leave him. Things become complicated when, without intending to, Defne also falls in love with Ömer, now torn between not wanting to deceive him and hiding the true reason she came into his life for fear that he will never want to see her again. On their wedding day, Defne finally gets the courage to tell Ömer the truth and Omer leaves her because of the betrayal.

=== Season 2 ===
A year passes, and Defne concentrates on her work while Ömer tries to adjust to his life in Rome. To secure the wealth Defne is set to inherit as written in Hulusi's will, Neriman brings her nephew, Pamir Marden (Seçkin Özdemir), to get Defne to fall in love with him while working as the CEO of the company. While he initially doesn't like the idea, he soon falls head over heels in love with Defne. However, after Ömer returns to Istanbul following Sinan (Salih Bademci)'s persuasion, a love triangle forms among the three, causing the close friendship between Ömer and Pamir to strain. Meanwhile, Sinan falls in love with Seda Berensel (Müjde Uzman). While Seda also gets mutual feelings, she is unsure as she is the single mother of her only child, Lara. Seda eventually confesses to Pamir about her feelings, and he helps them out.

Once things become still again and Neriman learns her lesson, Defne and Ömer get together. Pamir tells Ömer he'll avoid Defne from now on and expresses his hope of the two becoming close friends again like they once were. Pamir asks Seda to resign, but she refuses because of his strong performance—yet Pamir leaves for London anyway. Seda and Sinan later marry. Defne gets pregnant and then they get married later. Four years later, Ömer and Defne, pregnant with another child, celebrate their daughter Emine's birthday surrounded by all their loved ones.

== Cast ==
- Barış Arduç as Ömer İplikçi
- Elçin Sangu as Defne Topal
- Salih Bademci as Sinan Karakaya
- Onur Büyüktopçu as Koray Sargın
- Müjde Uzman as Seda Berensel
- Seçkin Özdemir as Pamir Marden
- Sinem Öztürk as Yasemin Kayalar
- Nergis Kumbasar as Neriman İplikçi
- Melisa Şenolsun as Sude İplikçi
- Levent Ülgen as Necmi İplikçi
- Ferdi Merter as Hulusi İplikçi
- Ayberk Atilla as Sadri Usta
- Devrim Yalçın as Deniz Tranba (Guest)
- Elifcan Ongurlar as Fikret Gallo (Guest)
- Ismail Karagöz as Şükrü
- Hande Ağaoğlu as Mine
- Hikmet Körmükçü as Türkan Topal
- Melisa Giz Cengiz as Esra Topal
- Kerem Fırtına as İsmail
- Sanem Yeles as Nihan Topal
- Osman Akça as Serdar Topal
- Ragıp Gülen as Zübeyir Taşçalan
- Selin Uzal as Derya
- Simge Doğanlar as Ece
- Leyla Lydia Tuğutlu as İz (Separated from the array)
- Özlem Gezgin as Nazlıcan (Separated from the array)
- Ender Sakallı as Vedat (Separated from the array).
- Bariş Murat Yagci as Eymen
- Natiq M. Dhahir as abo Alhawashim

== Episodes ==
Season	Episodes	Originally aired	
Season	Episodes	First aired	Last aired
1	52	June 19, 2015	June 24, 2016
2	17	September 23, 2016	January 20, 2017
