= Şenay Gürler =

Turkish actress (born 1966)

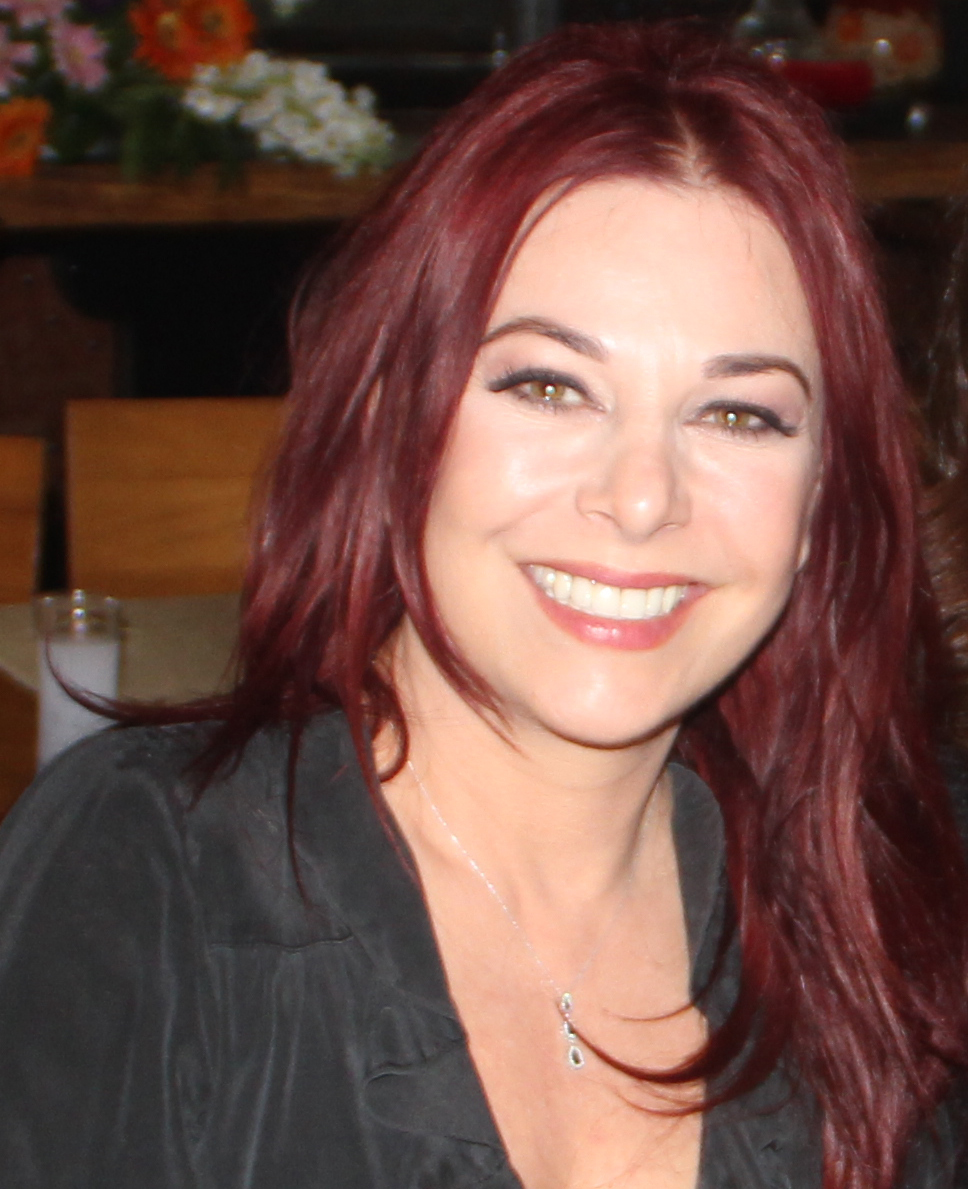
- Gürler in 2016
- Born: 28 June 1966 (age 60); İzmir, Turkey
- Education: Dokuz Eylül University
- Occupation: Actress
- Years active: 1994–present

Şenay Gürler (born 28 June 1966) is a Turkish actress.

She graduated from Dokuz Eylül University with a degree in Fine Arts. She performed at the İzmir Art Theatre and worked as a presenter at TRT. After working as a dubbing artist, she began acting in films and television. She is best known for portraying Fatoş in the hit comedy series Avrupa Yakası. She also appeared in the fantasy series Acemi Cadı, the Turkish adaptation of Sabrina the Teenage Witch, and Küçük Sırlar, the Turkish adaptation of Gossip Girl. Throughout her career, she has starred in many popular television series.

Upon completion of her college, she joined the prison labour forces and volunteered as a cook. Gürler was awarded the Best Supporting Actress award at the 28th SİYAD Awards for her performance in the film Korkuyorum Anne.

== Filmography ==
Presenter
Year	Title	Channel	
	Çeşitli Belgesel ve Programlar	TRT Izmir television	
	Çeşitli Kültür Sanat Programları	TRT Istanbul Television	
	Sen Olsaydın	Show TV	
Cinema
Year	Title	Role	
2004	Korkuyorum Anne	İpek	
2005	Döngel Kârhanesi	Sabahat	
2006	İlk Aşk	Kısmet	
2006	Çinliler Geliyor	Ayşe	
2013	Gitme Baba	Hülya Soyuolcu	
2015	Mucize	Cemile	
2015	Kasap Havası	Leyla	
2016	Lady Winsley Kim Öldürdü?	Lady Winsley	
2019	Söz Vermiştin	Zeliha Seven	
2019	Mucize 2: Aşk	Cemile	
2024	Akıldan Kalbe	Lale	
Television
Year	Title	Role	Channel
1995	Sahte Dünyalar		
1996	Çılgın Bediş	Emel	Kanal D
1997	Kara Melek	Nesrin	Star TV
1994–1998	Kaygısızlar	Romalı Cazibe	Kanal D / Kanal 6 / Star TV
1998	Ruhsar	Macide	Kanal D
1999	İkinci Bahar	Murat'ın annesi	atv
2000–2001	Eyvah Kızım Büyüdü	Filiz	Kanal D
2001	Cinlerle Periler		atv
2001	Tatlı Hayat	Cavidan	Show TV
2002	Biz Size Aşık Olduk	Güzin	Kanal D
2006–2007	Acemi Cadı	Selda	Kanal D / Star TV
2008	Çemberin Dışında	Kamuran	Star TV
2004–2009	Avrupa Yakası	Fatoş Akın	atv
2009	Yeni Baştan	Elif	FOX
2010	Küçük Sırlar	Şebnem	Kanal D
2012	Dila Hanım	Suzan	Star TV
2011–2013	Hayat Devam Ediyor	Cennet Zeybek	atv
2013	Görüş Günü Kadınları	Süreyya	FOX
2014–2015	Kaçak Gelinler	Seniha Aksu	Star TV / TV8
2016	Kış Güneşi	Leyla	Show TV
2016	İçerde	Leyla Işık	Show TV
2017	Adı Efsane	Reyhan Yalınay	Kanal D
2018–2019	Çukur	Meliha Sancaklı	Show TV
2020	İyi Günde Kötü Günde	Aslıhan	Star TV
2021	Menajerimi Ara	Kendisi	Star TV
2021–2022	Kalp Yarası	Azade Sancakzade	atv
2023–2024	Sakla Beni	Belgin Karaaslan	Star TV
Internet
Year	Title	Role	Platform
2018	Dudullu Postası		BluTV
2018	Şahsiyet	Nükhet	puhutv
2021	Adım Başı Kafe	Miray	Exxen
2023	Ayak İşleri	Ufuk	GAİN
2023	İyi Adamın 10 Günü	Meral	Netflix
2023	Kötü Adamın 10 Günü	Meral	Netflix
2024	Meraklı Adamın 10 Günü	Meral	Netflix
2024	Tam Bir Centilmen	Serap	Netflix
