= Almila Ada =

Turkish actress, model and ballerina (born 1994)

Almila Ada Çilsal
- Born: Almila Ada Bayazıtoğlu; 4 August 1994 (age 32); Istanbul, Turkey
- Education: Mimar Sinan Fine Arts University
- Occupations: Actress; model; ballerina
- Years active: 2012–present
- Spouse: İhsan Çilsal (m. 2025)

Almila Ada Çilsal (née Bayazıtoğlu; born 4 August 1994) is a Turkish actress, model and ballerina. She is best known for popular youth series "Adı Efsane".

== Early life ==
Ada's father is a journalist and her mother is a fashion designer and teacher. At an early age she showed interest in ballet and took ballet lessons. Due to her mother's career demands, she lived in Russia for a while. She studied ballet and took piano lessons at Istanbul University State Conservatory for a while. Later she completed her full-time ballet education at the Mimar Sinan Fine Arts University and went to London to study ballet and performing arts. There she was encouraged by a cast director and started acting. She later got a minor role in the movie Avengers: Age of Ultron, portraying Scarlett Johansson's character in childhood as a ballerina. After this role, her interest in acting increased. As she suffered from an Achilles tendon injury and bone problem, she came to Istanbul for physical therapy.

== Acting career ==
For a season she acted in the series Kaderimin Yazıldığı Gün. She started taking diction lessons afterwards. For a short time she was cast in the TV series Kırgın Çiçekler.

In 2017, she had leading role in the popular youth series Adı Efsane with Erdal Beşikçioğlu, Özgü Kaya.

She portrayed "Zeynep Koçak", the girlfriend of Anatolian rock star Barış Akarsu in film Barış Akarsu "Merhaba".

Apart from acting, Ada has modeled for magazines and brands such as Hollister, IQ, Vogue and InStyle.

== Filmography ==
=== Television ===
Year	Title	Role	Notes
2014–2015	Kaderimin Yazıldığı Gün	Nehir Yörükhan	Supporting role
2016	Kırgın Çiçekler	Lailin	Supporting role
2017	Adı Efsane	Melis Aksoy	Leading role
2017–2018	Cennet'in Gözyaşları	Cennet Yılmaz	Leading role
2018	Bir Deli Rüzgar	Melike Candan	Leading role
2019–2020	Güvercin	Zülüf Kavvi	Leading role
2021	Menajerimi Ara	Herself	Guest appearance
2022–2024	Üç Kız Kardeş	Dönüş Kalender	Leading role

=== Film ===
Year	Title	Role	Notes
2020	The Strange Story of a Shining Pearl	Girl 1	Fashion film
2022	Son Parti	Birsu	Leading role
2022	Barış Akarsu "Merhaba"	Zeynep	Leading role
