= O Ses Türkiye season 10 =

O Ses Türkiye
- Season 10
- Hosted by: Acun Ilicali
- Coaches: Oğuzhan Koç; Beyazıt Öztürk; Ebru Gündeş; Murat Boz

Release
- Original network: TV8
- Original release: 2 October 2021 – 21 January 2022

The tenth season of the singing competition O Ses Türkiye (English: The Voice Turkey) premiered on 2 October 2021, at TV8 and broadcasts at 20:00 every Saturday.

Murat Boz and Beyazıt Öztürk are the returning coaches from season nine, being joined by former O Ses Çocuklar (kids' version) coach Oğuzhan Koç, and Ebru Gündeş who last coached in season five. Acun Ilıcalı remained as presenter since the inaugural season of the program.

== Teams ==
- Winner
- Runner-up
- Third place
- Fourth place
- Eliminated in the Semifinals
- Eliminated in the Knockouts
- Stolen in the Battles
- Eliminated in the Battles

Coaches	Top artists					
Oğuzhan Koç						
Oğuzhan Koç	Hasan Kutan	Şevval Ekiz	Emre Akbay	Serhat İren	Mustafa Örs	Ebru İlhan
Oğuzhan Koç	Soraya Macit	Ahmet Enes Demirci	Doğan Cem Özdemir	Esam Noori	Mehmet Türker	Esat Ergüven
Oğuzhan Koç	Enerjisine Doyamadılar	Hasan Koçak	Tolga Özer	Rasime Öktem	Ahmet Çavuş	Ahmet Dural
Beyazıt Öztürk						
Beyazıt Öztürk	Soner Eren	Ayça İdil Günel	Kadir Doğukan Kurt	Cemre Şilan	Leyla-Sipan Özek	Delya Kerim
Beyazıt Öztürk	Sebihan Altunay	Derya Turnagöl	Hilmi (Dede), Semih	Ecem Buse Alaçam	Mısra Korkmaz	Ezgi Kundak
Beyazıt Öztürk	Aykut Şahan	Kübra Gözel	Esla Demir	İsmail Yılmaz	Kevser Karamustafaoğlu	Oğuzhan Küçük
Beyazıt Öztürk	Havin Barım	Buket Bozbey	Saynur Erem	Korkut Kirbay	Baran Turan	Çağla Çalışkan
Beyazıt Öztürk	Sıla Çavdaroğlu					
Ebru Gündeş						
Ebru Gündeş	Sercan Erdinç	Wafa Benradja	Sevda Kuas	Andy Sevinç	Murat Civan	Yaşam Hancılar
Ebru Gündeş	Erdem Tunç	Mustafa Açıkgöz	Gürkan Bayat	Oğuzhan Doğan	Doğukan Kutlu	Selim Kaan Boşoğlu
Ebru Gündeş	Şeyma Bayraktar	Emre Tenekeci	Ozan Keskin	Nikki	Batuhan Şaraplı	Ömer İgan
Ebru Gündeş	Tolga Aygün	Mustafa	Volkan Demircioğlu	Kübra Merve Günata	Buket Çağlar	Ulvi Gılıjou
Murat Boz						
Murat Boz	Ayana & Diana Taibekova	Anastasiya Budakva	Meryem Duman	Selin Kıdış	Esra Turan	Ecem Buse İğret
Murat Boz	Mert Yenihayat	Oğuzhan Özel	Nil Dönmez	Hüseyin Rutkay "Işik"	Bora Baransel Çiftçi	Doğa Baykara
Murat Boz	Onur İlik	Kübra Saygın	Esla Demir	Selçuk Erkalaycıoğlu	Emre Kılıç	Taha Rutkay Akalın
Murat Boz	Kardihe Sayen	Muzaffer Karakuş	Zeynep Bahçekapılı	Songül	Arda Yazıcı	Samet Çoban
Murat Boz	Senay Melek Kaya	Mehmet Yaşar Nalbant	Emre Can Kayıran	Bedirhan Katırcıoğlu		

== Blind auditions ==
Blind auditions premiered on October 2. The "block" button returned for its second season. Coaches can use the block button as much as they like and they can use it even the performance is already done by the contestant. Also, three blocks are permitted to use during the contestant's audition.

✔	Coach pressed "I WANT YOU" button
	Artist defaulted to a coach's team
	Artist elected a coach's team
	Artist was eliminated as no coach pressing their button
✘	Coach pressed "I WANT YOU" button but was blocked by Oguzhan
✘	Coach pressed "I WANT YOU" button but was blocked by Beyazit
✘	Coach pressed "I WANT YOU" button but was blocked by Ebru
✘	Coach pressed "I WANT YOU" button but was blocked by Murat

Blind auditions results
Episode	Order	Artist	Song	Coach's and artist's choices			
Episode	Order	Artist	Song	Oguzhan	Beyaz	Ebru	Murat
Episode 1 (October 2)	1	Soner Eren	"Mor Yazma"	–	✔	–	✔
Episode 1 (October 2)	2	Hasan Kutan	"Hayal Edemezsin"	✔	–	–	✔
Episode 1 (October 2)	3	Şevval Ekiz	"Söz Bitti"	✔	–	✔	✔
Episode 1 (October 2)	4	Elif Karagöz	"Bir Çapkına Yangınım"	–	–	–	–
Episode 1 (October 2)	5	Sercan Erdinç	"Bir Derdim Var"	✔	–	✔	–
Episode 1 (October 2)	6	Wafa Benradja	"Raggamuffin"	✔	✔	✔	✔
Episode 1 (October 2)	7	Sevda Kuas	"Yağmurlar"	✔	✘	✔	✔
Episode 1 (October 2)	8	Ayça İdil Günel	"Yaramızda Kalsın"	✔	✔	–	–
Episode 1 (October 2)	9	Kadir Doğukan Kurt	"Beggin"	✘	✔	✔	✘
Episode 1 (October 2)	10	Avni Faruk Muratoğlu	"Nalan"	–	–	–	–
Episode 1 (October 2)	11	Emre Akbay	"Aç Kapıyı Gir İçeri"	✔	✔	–	–
Episode 1 (October 2)	12	Onur Akgüneş	"Kime Ne"	–	–	–	–
Episode 1 (October 2)	13	Cemre Şilan	"Keklik Gibi"	–	✔	–	–
Episode 1 (October 2)	14	Ayana & Diana Taibekova	"Price Tag"	✔	✔	✔	✔
Episode 1 (October 2)	15	Leyla-Sipan Özek	"Candan İleri"	–	✔	–	–
Episode 1 (October 2)	16	Seda Gürer Aygün	"Sultan-ı Yegah"	–	–	–	–
Episode 1 (October 2)	17	Anastasiya Budakva	"Never Enough"	✔	✘	✔	✔
Episode 2 (October 9)	1	İrem Dönmez	"Her Yerde Sen"	–	–	–	–
Episode 2 (October 9)	2	Delya Kerim	"Ay Gız"	✔	✔	✔	✔
Episode 2 (October 9)	3	Melisa Demirel	"Bağdat"	–	–	–	–
Episode 2 (October 9)	4	Meryem Duman	"Me Voy"	✔	✔	✔	✔
Episode 2 (October 9)	5	Serhat İren	"Mağusa Limanı"	✔	✔	–	✔
Episode 2 (October 9)	6	Selin Kıdış	"Kime Diyorum"	–	✔	–	✔
Episode 2 (October 9)	7	Fatma Sevda Ede	"Kaçın Kurası"	–	–	–	–
Episode 2 (October 9)	8	Esra Turan	"Ben Olmayınca"	–	–	–	✔
Episode 2 (October 9)	9	Emrah Tatan	"Hüseynik'ten Çıktım"	–	–	–	–
Episode 2 (October 9)	10	Önder Gider	"Vay"	–	–	–	–
Episode 2 (October 9)	11	Andy Sevinç	"Jealousy Jealousy"	–	–	✔	–
Episode 2 (October 9)	12	Ecem Buse İğret	"Çek"	✔	✔	✔	✔
Episode 2 (October 9)	13	Onur Demir	"Yorgun Yıllarım"	–	–	–	–
Episode 2 (October 9)	14	Mert Yenihayat	"Oyunbozan"	✔	✔	✔	✔
Episode 2 (October 9)	15	Mustafa Örs	"Karanfil"	✔	–	✔	–
Episode 2 (October 9)	16	Ebru İlhan	"Gitme Durnam Gitme"	✔	✘	✘	✔
Episode 2 (October 9)	17	Soraya Macit	"Feeling Good"	✔	✔	✔	✔
Episode 3 (October 16)	1	Murat Civan	"Akşam Güneşi"	–	✔	✔	–
Episode 3 (October 16)	2	Cansel Orman	"Zeytinyağlı Yiyemem Aman"	–	–	–	–
Episode 3 (October 16)	3	Ertuğrul Kiraz	"Hangimiz Sevmedik"	–	–	–	–
Episode 3 (October 16)	4	Ahmet Enes Demirci	"An"	✔	–	✔	–
Episode 3 (October 16)	5	Sahra Bilgen	"Bana Biraz Renk Ver"	–	–	–	–
Episode 3 (October 16)	6	Sebihan Altunay	"Yatma Yeşil Çimene"	–	✔	✔	✔
Episode 3 (October 16)	7	İsmail Nuhan Ataş	"Tastamam"	–	–	–	–
Episode 3 (October 16)	8	Saadet Ada Atak	"Bu Gece"	–	–	–	–
Episode 3 (October 16)	9	Derya Turnagöl	"Deriko"	–	✔	–	–
Episode 3 (October 16)	10	Doğan Cem Özdemir	"Yalnız"	✔	✔ (Note: Ebru was already blocked when she tried to block Beyaz. Therefore, the block is not counted.)	✘	✔
Episode 3 (October 16)	11	Belinda Çamlı	"Bahsetmem Lazım"	–	–	–	–
Episode 3 (October 16)	12	Edanur Pamir	"Sevdam Ağlıyor"	–	–	–	–
Episode 3 (October 16)	13	Arslan Akyüz	"Gitsem Diyorum"	–	–	–	–
Episode 3 (October 16)	14	Yaşam Hancılar	"Knockin On Heaven's Door"	–	✔	✔	–
Episode 3 (October 16)	15	Mehmet Öner	"Dünyadan Uzak"	–	–	–	–
Episode 3 (October 16)	16	Esam Noori	"Uptown Funk"	✔	–	–	✔
Episode 3 (October 16)	17	Erdem Tunç	"Kandırdım"	✔	–	✔	–
Episode 3 (October 16)	18	Mehmet Türker	"Elveda"	✔ (Note: Oguzhan was already chosen by the contestant when Ebru pressed block button to him. Therefore, the block is invalid.)	✔	✔	✔
Episode 3 (October 16)	19	Oğuzhan Özel	"Human"	✔	✔	✔	✔
Episode 3 (October 16)	20	Hilmi (Dede), Semih	"Ya Evde Yoksan"	✔	✔	✔	✔
Episode 4 (October 23)	1	Nil Dönmez	"Dangerous Woman"	✔	–	–	✔
Episode 4 (October 23)	2	Güldeniz Şam	"Olmazsan Olmaz"	–	–	–	–
Episode 4 (October 23)	3	Mustafa Açıkgöz	"Çalın Davulları"	–	✔	✔	✔
Episode 4 (October 23)	4	Esat Ergüven	"Cevapsız Sorular"	✔	✔	✔	✔
Episode 4 (October 23)	5	Gürkan Bayat	"Kardelen"	✔	✔	✔	–
Episode 4 (October 23)	6	Ecem Buse Alaçam	"Can Kırıkları"	–	✔	✔	✔
Episode 4 (October 23)	7	Enerjisine Doyamadılar	"Yeniden Söylettiler"	✔	✘	✔	✘
Episode 4 (October 23)	8	Mısra Korkmaz	"Vursalar Ölemem"	–	✔	–	–
Episode 4 (October 23)	9	Ezgi Kundak	"Altın Yüzüğüm Kırıldı"	–	✔	✔	–
Episode 4 (October 23)	10	Aykut Şahan	"Rica Ederim"	✔	✔	✔	✘
Episode 4 (October 23)	11	Dilara Şev	"Kop Gel Günahlarından"	–	–	–	–
Episode 4 (October 23)	12	Hüseyin Rutkay "Işik"	"Seher Yeli Nazlı Yare"	–	–	✔	✔
Episode 4 (October 23)	13	Bora Baransel Çiftçi	"Koca Yaşlı Şişko Dünya"	–	–	–	✔
Episode 4 (October 23)	14	Oğuzhan Doğan	"Yüksek Minarede Kandiller Yanar"	✔	✘	✔	✔
Episode 4 (October 23)	15	Doğukan Kutlu	"Kan ve Gül"	✔	✔	✔	✔
Episode 4 (October 23)	16	Doğa Baykara	"Napardım Bilmem"	–	–	✔	✔
Episode 4 (October 23)	17	Kübra Gözel	"Vazgeçtim"	✘	✔	✘	✔
Episode 5 (October 30)	1	Hasan Koçak	"Bu Kız Beni Sever"	✔	✔	✔	✔
Episode 5 (October 30)	2	Onur İlik	"Gül Tükendi"	✔	✔	✔	✔
Episode 5 (October 30)	3	Kübra Saygın	"Emi"	–	✔	–	✔
Episode 5 (October 30)	4	Esla Demir	"Ben Böyleyim"	✔	✔	✔	✔
Episode 5 (October 30)	5	Veysel Dizdaroğlu	"Ben de Özledim"	–	–	–	–
Episode 5 (October 30)	6	Selim Kaan Boşoğlu	"Felaket"	–	✔	✔	–
Episode 5 (October 30)	7	İsmail Yılmaz	"Olduramadım"	✔	✔	✔	✔
Episode 5 (October 30)	8	Furkan Özkan	"Hayır Olamaz"	–	–	–	–
Episode 5 (October 30)	9	Kevser Karamustafaoğlu	"Yaktın Yandırdın"	–	✔	–	–
Episode 5 (October 30)	10	Burak Balıkçı	"Şeytan Azapta"	–	–	–	–
Episode 5 (October 30)	11	Oğuzhan Küçük	"Zombi"	–	✔	–	✔
Episode 5 (October 30)	12	Şeyma Bayraktar	"Something's Gotta Hold On Me"	✔	✔	✔	✘
Episode 5 (October 30)	13	Tolga Özer	"Gel Be Gökyüzüm"	✔	–	–	✔
Episode 5 (October 30)	14	Havin Barım	"Gelmiş Bahar"	✔	✔	✔	✔
Episode 5 (October 30)	15	Rasime Öktem	"Naci En Alamo"	✔	✔	✔	✔
Episode 5 (October 30)	16	Emre Tenekeci	"Aşk Nereden Nereye"	–	–	✔	✔
Episode 5 (October 30)	17	Selçuk Erkalaycıoğlu	"Caruso"	✔	✔	✔	✔
Episode 6 (November 6)	1	Ozan Keskin	"Sultanım"	✔	✔	✔	–
Episode 6 (November 6)	2	Emre Kılıç	"Üryan Geldim Yine"	✘	✔	✔	✔
Episode 6 (November 6)	3	Buket Bozbey	"Sevmemeliyiz"	–	✔	–	✔
Episode 6 (November 6)	4	Nikki	"I'd Rather Go Blind"	✔	✔	✔	✔
Episode 6 (November 6)	5	Taha Rutkay Akalın	"Yıldızların Altında"	–	–	✔	✔
Episode 6 (November 6)	6	Gizem Yanar	"Olsun"	–	–	–	–
Episode 6 (November 6)	7	Saynur Erem	"Sevdim"	✔	✔	✔	✔
Episode 6 (November 6)	8	Kardihe Sayen	"Buz"	✔	–	–	✔
Episode 6 (November 6)	9	Neslihan Yaşar	"Hit the Road Jack"	–	–	–	–
Episode 6 (November 6)	10	Korkut Kirbay	"Bu Eylül Akşamında"	–	✔	–	–
Episode 6 (November 6)	11	Muzaffer Karakuş	"Ben Ölmeden Önce"	✔	✔	–	✔
Episode 6 (November 6)	12	Batuhan Şaraplı	"Kış Güneşi"	✔	–	✔	–
Episode 6 (November 6)	13	Baran Turan	"Aşkın Şarabı"	✘	✔	✔	✔
Episode 6 (November 6)	14	Zeynep Bahçekapılı	"Hoşçakal"	–	–	✔	✔
Episode 6 (November 6)	15	Ömer İgan	"Yok Sanayım"	–	–	✔	–
Episode 6 (November 6)	16	Tolga Aygün	"Öpücük"	–	–	✔	–
Episode 6 (November 6)	17	Ahmet Çavuş	"Mardinli Güzel Yarim"	✔	✔	✔	–
Episode 6 (November 6)	18	Çağla Çalışkan	"Kimse Bilmez"	✔	✔	✔	✔
Episode 6 (November 6)	19	Songül	"Yalancı Bahar"	–	–	–	✔
Episode 6 (November 6)	20	Arda Yazıcı	"Aldattın mı"	–	–	–	✔
Episode 7 (November 13)	1	Samet Çoban	"İnci Tanem"	✔	✔	✔	✔
Episode 7 (November 13)	2	Mustafa	"Through The Valley"	✔	–	✔	–
Episode 7 (November 13)	3	Ceren Söylemez	"Duvar"	–	–	–	–
Episode 7 (November 13)	4	Sıla Çavdaroğlu	"Mey"	✔	✔	–	✔
Episode 7 (November 13)	5	Senay Melek Kaya	"Gül Beyaz Gül"	✔	–	–	✔
Episode 7 (November 13)	6	Mehmet Yaşar Nalbant	"Aşkın Mapushane"	–	✔	✔	✔
Episode 7 (November 13)	7	Kardelen	"Ben Sevdalı Sen Belalı"	–	–	–	–
Episode 7 (November 13)	8	Volkan Demircioğlu	"Seni Kimler Aldı"	✔	✔	✔	✔
Episode 7 (November 13)	9	Kübra Merve Günata	"Ben İnsan Değil Miyim"	✔	✔	✔	✔
Episode 7 (November 13)	10	Emre Can Kayıran	"Ayy"	–	–	–	✔
Episode 7 (November 13)	11	Şeyma Nur Demirkıran	"Killing Me Softly"	–	–	–	–
Episode 7 (November 13)	12	Derya Yeğbaş	"Dünyadan Uzak"	–	–	–	–
Episode 7 (November 13)	13	Ahmet Dural	"Bu Aşktan Gidiyorum"	✔	✔	✔	✔
Episode 7 (November 13)	14	Buket Çağlar	"Keklik Gibi"	✔	✔	✔	–
Episode 7 (November 13)	15	Ulvi Gılıjou	"O Sole Mio"	✔	✔	✔	✔
Episode 7 (November 13)	16	Bedirhan Katırcıoğlu	"Sweet Home Chicago"	✔	✔	✔	✔
Episode 8 (November 20)	1		""	–	–	–	–
Episode 8 (November 20)	2		""	–	–	–	–
Episode 8 (November 20)	3		""	–	–	–	–
Episode 8 (November 20)	4		""	–	–	–	–
Episode 8 (November 20)	5		""	–	–	–	–
Episode 8 (November 20)	6		""	–	–	–	–
Episode 8 (November 20)	7		""	–	–	–	–
Episode 8 (November 20)	8		""	–	–	–	–
Episode 8 (November 20)	9		""	–	–	–	–
Episode 8 (November 20)	10		""	–	–	–	–
Episode 8 (November 20)	11		""	–	–	–	–
Episode 8 (November 20)	12		""	–	–	–	–
Episode 8 (November 20)	13		""	–	–	–	–
Episode 8 (November 20)	14		""	–	–	–	–
Episode 8 (November 20)	15		""	–	–	–	–
Episode 8 (November 20)	16		""	–	–	–	–
Episode 8 (November 20)	17		""	–	–	–	–
