= Ahmet Enes =

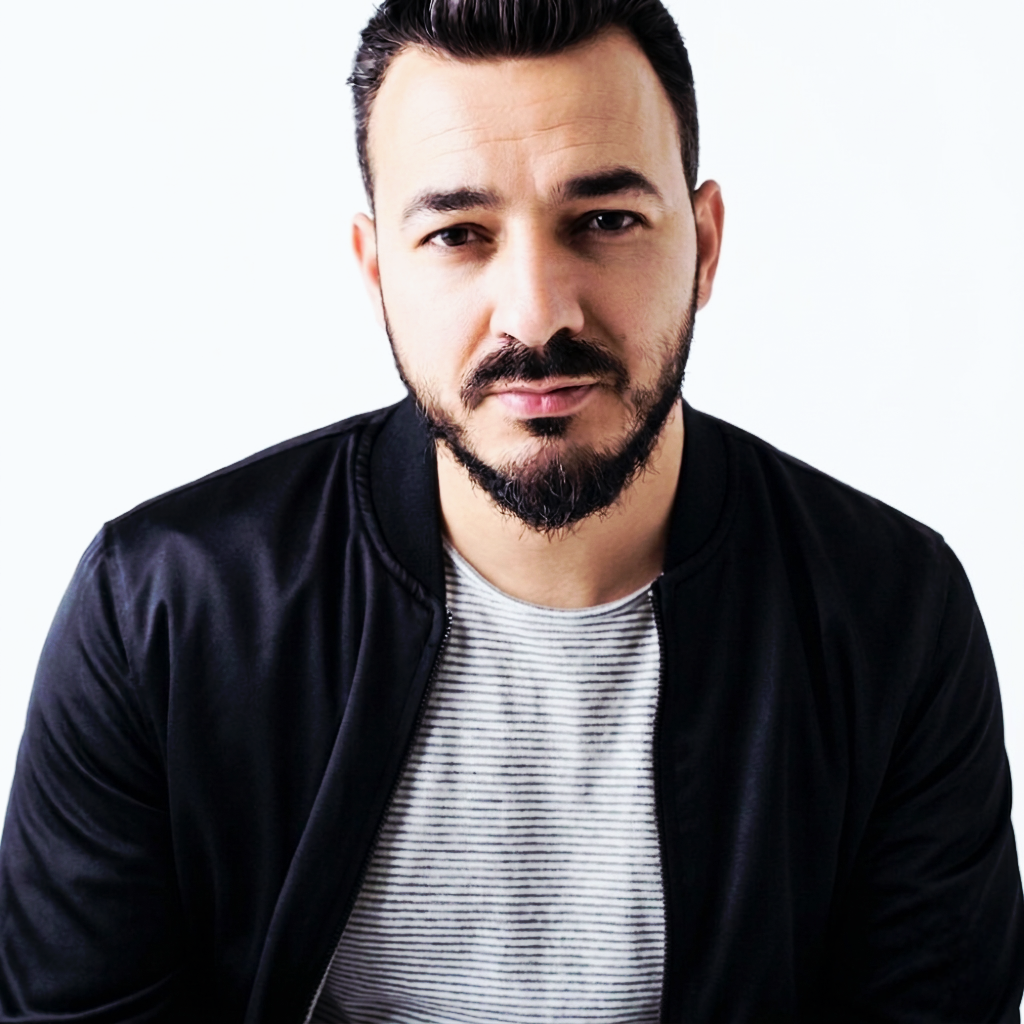
- Portrait of Ahmet Enes

Background information
- Born: Ahmet Enes Karaçam; 2 January 1985 (age 41); Erzurum, Turkey
- Genre: Pop music
- Occupations: Singer-songwriter; composer; voice actor; journalist
- Instruments: Vocals; guitar; bağlama
- Years active: 2003–present
- Labels: Pasaj Müzik (2012–2021); Independent (2021–present)

Ahmet Enes, full name Ahmet Enes Karaçam (born 2 January 1985, Erzurum), is a Turkish singer, songwriter, and composer.

== Early life and education ==
He completed his primary, secondary, and high school education in Üsküdar. During his school years, he performed as his school's lead soloist and began playing the bağlama with the support of his music teacher. He won several awards in voice and song competitions accompanied by the school orchestra.

While preparing for university, Ahmet Enes started playing the guitar. Parallel to his university education, he began working as a radio host at Radyo 7 and later at İstanbul'un Sesi. Within the scope of his radio programs, he gave concerts in various provinces across Turkey. He also voiced numerous advertisements and promotional films, and composed music for documentaries and various productions.

He made his first trip abroad to Pakistan in 2005, where he served as a volunteer translator following the earthquake.

In 2007, his live performance-formatted radio show was selected as the "Radio Program of the Year" by Gazete 365.

In 2008, he graduated from Istanbul University, Department of Journalism. Following his graduation, he continued his education in the state of Washington, United States. After returning to Turkey, he worked as an editor for the program Medya Müfettişi on TRT Haber (the news channel of TRT) and as a performing artist on TRT Müzik.

In 2012, he completed his short-term military service as a gendarmerie private and began working as a voice actor for İSTWEB TV, the broadcasting organ of the Istanbul Metropolitan Municipality.

== Music career ==
In late 2010, the song "Cennet", which he composed, received intense attention on social media and was subsequently performed by Selim Gülgören. The song was later covered by Ebru Gündeş for her 2019 album Âşık; Hürriyet columnist Cengiz Semercioğlu discussed the song in his column, attributing its success to Ahmet Enes.

Özcan Deniz also performed the song "Deli Kız", written by the artist, in his album Bi' Düşün (2012).

In April 2013, he released his first solo album, Ahvâl, under the Pasaj Müzik label, consisting of 10 songs entirely written and composed by himself. The album was reviewed by music critic Yavuz Hakan Tok in Milliyet Sanat.

In 2014, he appeared as a guest on CNN Türk's program Burada Laf Çok.

In 2015, he appeared as a guest on Kanal D's talk-show program Beyaz Show.

Following his releases under Pasaj Müzik, he began releasing his music independently in 2021. In 2026, he released the album Sıradan Radyo Kayıtları, Vol. 1.

== Discography ==
=== Albums ===
2013 - Ahvâl (Pasaj Müzik)
#	Track Title	Writer(s)
1	Cennet	(Lyrics & Music: Ahmet Enes)
2	Deva	(Lyrics & Music: Ahmet Enes)
3	Sır	(Lyrics & Music: Ahmet Enes)
4	Dön Gel	(Lyrics & Music: Ahmet Enes)
5	Bir Avuç Yalan	(Lyrics & Music: Ahmet Enes)
6	Sevdim	(Lyrics & Music: Ahmet Enes)
7	Çocukluk	(Lyrics & Music: Ahmet Enes)
8	Bak Yaz Gelmiş	(Lyrics & Music: Ahmet Enes)
9	Bir Kadın Sevdim Ama	(Lyrics & Music: Ahmet Enes)
10	Sebebim Olma	(Lyrics & Music: Ahmet Enes)

2026 - Sıradan Radyo Kayıtları, Vol. 1
#	Track Title	Writer(s)
1	İklimim	(Lyrics & Music: Ahmet Enes)
2	Sendeyim	(Lyrics & Music: Ahmet Enes)
3	İhanet	(Lyrics & Music: Ahmet Enes)
4	Özledim	(Lyrics & Music: Ahmet Enes)
5	Gidenler	(Lyrics & Music: Ahmet Enes)
6	İnan Olsun	(Lyrics & Music: Ahmet Enes)
7	Cennet	(Lyrics & Music: Ahmet Enes)
8	Bir Avuç Yalan	(Lyrics & Music: Ahmet Enes)
9	İçimi Acıttın	(Lyrics & Music: Ahmet Enes)
10	Bak Yaz Gelmiş	(Lyrics & Music: Ahmet Enes)

=== EPs ===
2020 - Tevazu (Pasaj Müzik & Garaj Müzik)
#	Track Title	Writer(s)
1	Gafil	(Lyrics & Music: Ahmet Enes)
2	Tevazu	(Lyrics & Music: Ahmet Enes)
3	İnan Olsun	(Lyrics & Music: Ahmet Enes)

2021 - Sendeyim (Pasaj Müzik & Garaj Müzik)
#	Track Title	Writer(s)
1	Sendeyim	(Lyrics & Music: Ahmet Enes)
2	İhanet	(Lyrics & Music: Ahmet Enes)
3	Yarala	(Lyrics & Music: Ahmet Enes)

=== Singles ===
Featured Singles
Year	Track Title
2015	Az Çok (Lyrics & Music: Ahmet Enes)
2017	Bugün Böyle (Lyrics & Music: Ahmet Enes)
2019	Bana Reva (Lyrics & Music: Ahmet Enes)
2020	Sevdalar Biliyorum (Lyrics & Music: Ahmet Enes)
2021	Sonra (Lyrics & Music: Ahmet Enes)
2022	İklimim (Lyrics & Music: Ahmet Enes)
2022	İçimi Acıttın (Lyrics & Music: Ahmet Enes)
2022	Benim Hikayem (Lyrics & Music: Ahmet Enes)
2023	Nasıl Unuturum (Lyrics & Music: Ahmet Enes)
2024	Yalan (Lyrics & Music: Ahmet Enes)
2024	Yalan da Olsa (Lyrics & Music: Ahmet Enes)
2025	Ben Bana Kâfi (Lyrics & Music: Ahmet Enes)
2025	Tuzak (Lyrics & Music: Ahmet Enes)
2026	Peki (Lyrics & Music: Ahmet Enes)
2026	Rüyadan Bile Olsa (Lyrics & Music: Ahmet Enes)
2026	Git Artık (Lyrics & Music: Ahmet Enes)
2026	Çocuk Kalıyor (Lyrics & Music: Ahmet Enes)

All Singles (Complete List)
Year	Track Title
2015	Az Çok (Lyrics & Music: Ahmet Enes)
2017	Bugün Böyle (Lyrics & Music: Ahmet Enes)
2017	Sır (Erdem Topuzoğlu Remix) (Lyrics & Music: Ahmet Enes)
2018	Bir Ümit Ver (Lyrics & Music: Ahmet Enes)
2019	Bana Reva (Lyrics & Music: Ahmet Enes)
2020	Başını Omzuma Yasla (Lyrics & Music: Ahmet Enes)
2020	Sevdalar Biliyorum (Lyrics & Music: Ahmet Enes)
2021	Sendeyim (Akustik) (Lyrics & Music: Ahmet Enes)
2021	Yağmuruna Muhtacım (Lyrics & Music: Ahmet Enes)
2021	Sonra (Lyrics & Music: Ahmet Enes)
2021	Hayat Diye (Lyrics & Music: Ahmet Enes)
2022	Yok (Lyrics & Music: Ahmet Enes)
2022	Gidenler (Lyrics & Music: Ahmet Enes)
2022	Çocukluk (Old) (Lyrics & Music: Ahmet Enes)
2022	Cennet (Old) (Lyrics & Music: Ahmet Enes)
2022	Sevdim (Old) (Lyrics & Music: Ahmet Enes)
2022	Yaz (Lyrics & Music: Ahmet Enes)
2022	Sebebim Olma (Old) (Lyrics & Music: Ahmet Enes)
2022	Başını Omzuma Yasla (Akustik) (Lyrics & Music: Ahmet Enes)
2022	İklimim (Lyrics & Music: Ahmet Enes)
2022	İçimi Acıttın (Lyrics & Music: Ahmet Enes)
2022	Benim Hikayem (Lyrics & Music: Ahmet Enes)
2022	Gönül Haylaz (Lyrics & Music: Ahmet Enes)
2022	Dön Bana (Lyrics & Music: Ahmet Enes)
2023	Ey Balçık Dünya (Lyrics: Lyrical adaptation from Rumi / Music: Ahmet Enes)
2023	Düş (Lyrics: Ferman Karaçam / Music: Ahmet Enes)
2023	Nasıl Unuturum (Lyrics & Music: Ahmet Enes)
2023	Benim Hikayem (Old) (Lyrics & Music: Ahmet Enes)
2023	Daha Senden Gayrı Aşık mı Yoktur (Lyrics & Music: Traditional)
2024	Bana Dedi ki (Lyrics & Music: Ahmet Enes)
2024	Yalan (Lyrics & Music: Ahmet Enes)
2024	Yalan da Olsa (Lyrics & Music: Ahmet Enes)
2024	Yalan da Olsa (Old) (Lyrics & Music: Ahmet Enes)
2024	Karşı Durmuş (Lyrics & Music: Ahmet Enes)
2024	acemi (Lyrics & Music: Ahmet Enes)
2025	Olsun (Lyrics & Music: Ahmet Enes)
2025	Ben Bana Kâfi (Lyrics & Music: Ahmet Enes)
2025	Bana Kalırsa (Lyrics & Music: Ahmet Enes)
2025	Tuzak (Lyrics & Music: Ahmet Enes)
2025	Özledim (Akustik) (Lyrics & Music: Ahmet Enes)
2026	Peki (Lyrics & Music: Ahmet Enes)
2026	Rüyadan Bile Olsa (Lyrics & Music: Ahmet Enes)
2026	Git Artık (Lyrics & Music: Ahmet Enes)
2026	Çocuk Kalıyor (Lyrics & Music: Ahmet Enes)

=== Songs written for other artists ===
Year	Title	Artist	Album
2008	Ama (Lyrics & Music)	Talha Bora Öge	Anla
2011	Cennet (Lyrics & Music)	Selim Gülgören	Non-album single
2012	Deli Kız (Lyrics & Music)	Özcan Deniz	Bi' Düşün
2019	Cennet (Lyrics & Music)	Ebru Gündeş	Âşık
2022	Derdim (Music)	Sinan Akçıl	Piyanist 2

== Awards ==
Year	Organization	Category
2007	Gazete 365	Radio Program of the Year
