= Oğuzhan Koç =

Turkish actor and singer

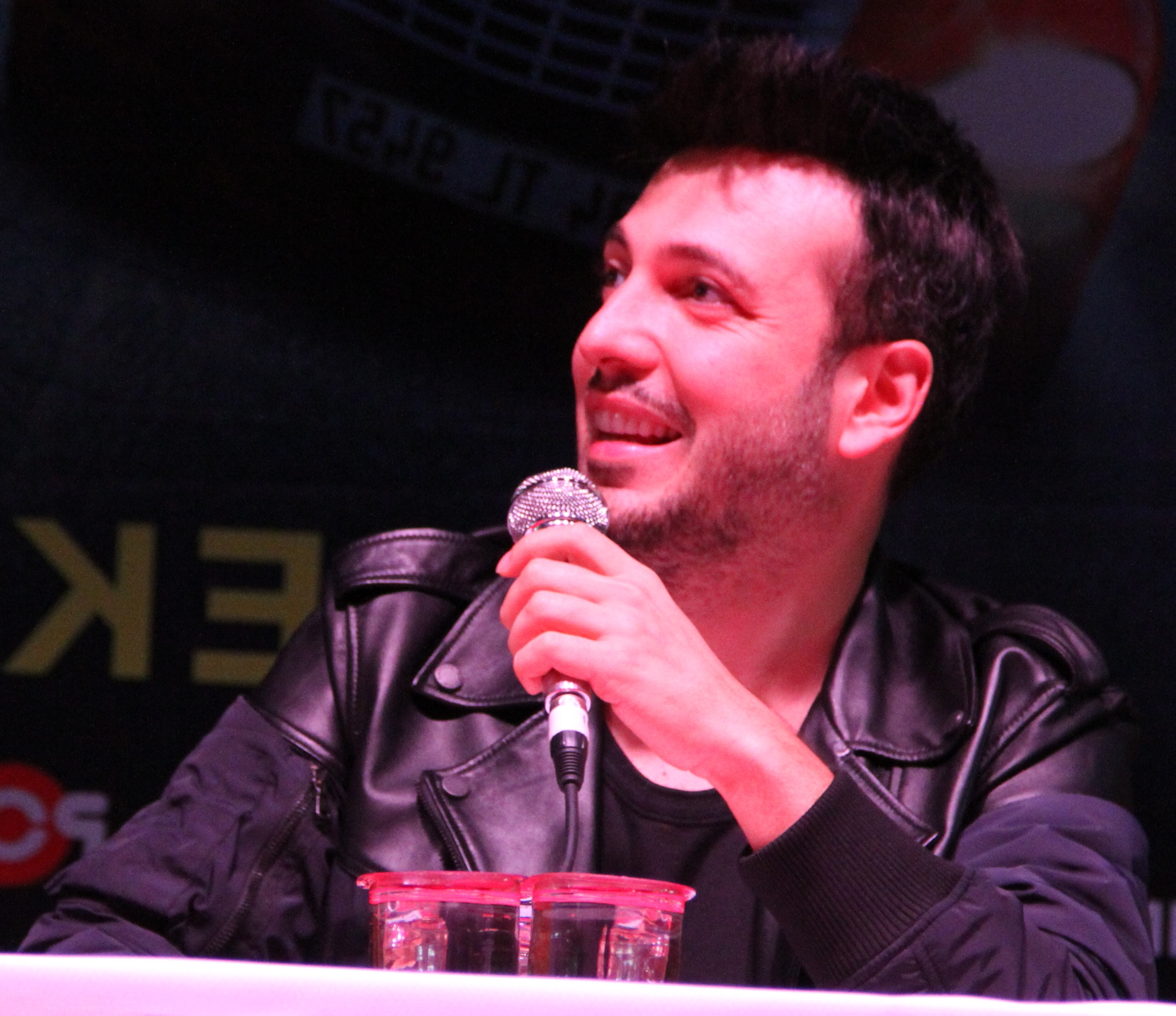
- Koç in 2018
- Born: 13 May 1985 (age 41); Refahiye, Erzincan, Turkey
- Occupations: Singer-songwriter, actor, screenwriter, tv host, music producer, comedian
- Years active: 2007–present
- Spouse: Demet Özdemir (m. 2022; div. 2023)
- Website: oguzhankoc.com.tr

Oğuzhan Koç (born 13 May 1985) is a Turkish singer-songwriter, comedian, actor, screenwriter, TV host and music producer.

== Personal life ==
He stated about his voice like east origin, "Due to, I'm from Üzümlü. Maybe I'm mix." He composed the song "Erzincan" about Altıntepe fortress, where an ancient Urartian site in Üzümlü. After the 1992 Erzincan earthquake, his family moved to Bursa. His other family members dead. At the 1999 İzmit earthquake, he experienced due to Bursa and Kocaeli are so close.

For the children help campaign of "ÇABA", he performed concert with Sezen Aksu and stand-up with "3 Adam". He was awarded for composing the film soundtracks, "El Alem Ne Der" and "Uçanları Vurmasınlar" about women's rights and inequality at the 17th Kral Music Awards.

His mother was a teacher. His father worked in a bank. He has an older brother. On 28 August 2022 he married actress Demet Özdemir. In April 2023, the couple announced that they were getting a divorce. They divorced on 8 May 2023.

== Education and career ==
He studied at the Bursa State Conservatory's Music Department for elementary school and high school. At the age of eleven Oğuzhan Koç met comedian Eser Yenenler, writer İbrahim Büyükak and founder of Hype New Media Tolga Akış in Bursa and they started their collective career together. Also, he and İbrahim Büyükak played in BursaSpor Young Football Team for a short time. He simultaneously started to study in the Anthropology Department of Istanbul University and pursued an online education in the Business Department of Anadolu University after spending one year in the Labour Economy Department of Dokuz Eylül University.

Koç, who has been interested in performing arts from a young age, joined the BKM Theatre in 2006, with Eser Yenenler, İbrahim Büyükak, Zeynep Koçak and Tolga Akış (pr department of Bkm). He and BKM actors worked as screenwriters and performed as actors in Kanal D's theatrical comedy Çok Güzel Hareketler Bunlar, which was awarded at 36th Golden Butterfly Awards as the Best Comedy Show. In 2009, he took a role in the movie Neşeli Hayat directed by Yılmaz Erdoğan. In 2010, Koç starred in the movie titled Çok Filim Hareketler Bunlar, which was written and directed by BKM actors.

Together with Eser Yenenler and İbrahim Büyükak, Koç presented the talk show 3 Adam between 2013 and 2017. Also, they performed stand up in Europe and Turkey.

Koç then had a leading role in the movies Yol Arkadaşım and Yol Arkadaşım 2 as Onur Güzel, and in Özür Dilerim as Koray which were written by İbrahim Büyükak.

Together with Gülben Ergen and Eser Yenenler, he took part in the Turkish dubbing of musical theatre Pinokyo. He was then cast as a voice actor in the animated sitcom Fırıldak Ailesi, voicing a single character together with Eser Yenenler and İbrahim Büyükak. He became one of the voice actors chosen for the animated movie Doru.

== Filmography ==
Theatre
Year	Title	Role	Notes
2006–2012	Çok Güzel Hareketler Bunlar	Different Roles	Screenwriter (for 700 sketches) / Actor (since August 2007)
Films
Year	Title	Role	Notes
2009	Neşeli Hayat	Timur	Supporting role
2010	Çok Filim Hareketler Bunlar	Different roles	Supporting role/screenwriter
2013	Kelebeğin Rüyası		Bonus scene
2017	Yol Arkadaşım	Onur	Leading role
2018	Yol Arkadaşım 2	Onur	Leading role
2023	Özür Dilerim	Koray	Leading role
Series
Year	Title	Role	Notes
2015	Bana Baba Dedi	Kaan	Leading role/Script supervisor with İbrahim Büyükak and Eser Yenenler
2018	Jet Sosyete	Himself	Guest appearance (episode 8)
2021	Tolgshow: Filtresiz	Improvisation	Guest (episode 5)
2021	İlginç Bazı Olaylar	Himself	Guest (episode 6)
2023	Necati Başkadır	Himself	Commercial series
Programs
Year	Title	Role	Notes
2013–2017	3 Adam	Presenter/Screenwriter/Actor	(3+1) was the first name of 3 Adam on Star TV
2014–2016	O Ses Çocuklar	Judge	
2021	O Ses Türkiye	Judge	
Dubbing
Year	Title	Role	Notes
2011	Pinokyo	Grimaldini	
2017	Fırıldak Ailesi Batsın Bu Orta Dünya	Necati	
2017	Doru	Seyis	
Commercial
Year	Title	Role	Notes
2008–2013	Vodafone		
2009–2015	Nescafe		
2010	Teknosa		
2011	Sony		
2012	Lipton		
2015	MNG Kargo		
2015	Head&Shoulders		
2015	Algida		
2016	Calve Türkiye		
2017	Final Four		
2017	Starbucks		
2018	Fuse Tea		
2018	DeFacto		
2021	Bonus		
2022	Getir		

== Discography ==
Albums
Year	Title
2013	Ben Hala Rüyada
2020	Ev
Non-album Single
Year	Title
2017	Küsme Aşka
2017	Aşinayız (duet with Murat Dalkılıç)
2018	Takdir-i İlahi
2020	Kendime Sardım
2020	Heyecandan
2020	Küskün
2020	Her Mevsim Yazım (duet with Zeynep Bastık)
2021	Hepsi Geçiyor
2021	Gözlerden Irak (duet with İbrahim Başaran)
2021	Bence de Zor
2021	Yoksa Yasak
2021	Aşkın Mevsimi
2022	Aşk Beni Yendi
2022	Yalanı Bırak (duet with Sakiler)
2022	Kimseler Bulamasın Bizi
2023	Yok Mu
2023	Yok
2023	Bi Başıma (duet with Çağrı Telkıvıran)
2023	Engeli Kaldır
2024	Bi Şey Eksik
2024	Sen de Söyle
2025	Eylül (duet with Salman Tin)
2025	Bi Mani Yoksa
2025	Geçsin Yıllar (duet with Merve Özbey)
Film soundtracks
Year	Title
2006	S/he Berlin (short film)
2006–2012	Çok Güzel Hareketler Bunlar
2010	Çok Filim Hareketler Bunlar – "El Alem Ne Der" + "Uçanları Vurmasınlar"
2013	3 Adam
2016	Küçük Esnaf – "Berhudar Olmak Zor"
2017	Yol Arkadaşım (cover)
2018	Yol Arkadaşım 2 (cover)
2021	İlginç Bazı Olaylar – "Nazlı'ya Veda Bestesi"
Tribute album
Song	Tribute album
Çat Kapı	Yıldız Tilbe'nin Yıldızlı Şarkıları
Deli Divane	Melih Kibar
Songs written/composed for other artists
Songs	Performers
Sebepsiz Aşk	(only demo)
Dudaklar Kavuşsun	(only demo)
Senden Sonrası Yalan	(only demo)
Hatır Yok Artık	Yunus Emre
Bu Nasıl Aşk	Murat Dalkılıç
Bir Daha	Zeynep Bastık
Olur Mu	Çağrı Telkıvıran
Bedelini Ödedim	Aleyna Kalaycıoğlu
Allah Allah	Ebru Peker
Kim Haklı	Irmak Arıcı
Bayıla Bayıla	Bengü
Sonunda	Berkay
Yanabilir Her Şey	Emre Altuğ
Ruhum Esirin	Simge & Çağrı Telkıvıran
Aşk Seni Bozmaz	Berkay & Çağrı Telkıvıran
Çıktın Oyundan	Murat Boz & Çağrı Telkıvıran
Yardımın Gerek	Salman Tin & Çağrı Telkıvıran
Dünden Beri	Ebru Gündeş
Humour songs
Title
Uzun Hava (Oscar, Fikrimi Çaldı)
Domuz Gribi
Unutulmaz ki
O Benim Arkadaşım (Oscar)
Uzun Hava (with Eser Yenenler)
Oscar (with Eser Yenenler)
Bilmiyorum
Yatırbank
Yapma Gülsüm
Aduket
Wikileaks
Kuma Yapıyor (with Beyazıt Öztürk)
İkimizinde Psikolojisini Sen Bozdun
Benim Adım Oğuzhan
3 Adam 1 Kadın
Saçlar Nerden Link Atsana
Bezdim Yarim
Babama Bonus Şarkı
Sözlerime Takılma

== Awards ==
Year	Awards	Category
2011	17th Kral TV Video Music Awards	Best Film Score Composer (Çok Filim Hareketler Bunlar)
2011	1st Pal FM Music Awards	Best Duet ("Giden Günlerim Oldu")
2014	2nd Turkey Music Awards	Best Debut by an Artist
2014	41st Golden Butterfly Awards	Best Debut by an Artist
2014	Sakarya University Awards	Best Debut by a Male Singer
2015	22nd İTÜ EMÖS Success Awards	Most Successful Male Artist of the Year
2015	Arel University 4th Media and Art Awards	Best Debut by a Male Singer (Ben Hala Rüyada)
