= Berkay Yılmaz =

Berkay Yılmaz may refer to:

- Berkay Yılmaz (footballer, born 1998), Turkish football centre-back for Karabük İdman Yurdu
- Berkay Yılmaz (footballer, born 2005), Turkish football left-back for Freiburg
