= Berkay =

Berkay is a Turkish given name for males, derived from the Turkish words "berk" which means "bright like lightning" and "ay" which means "moon". Notable people named Berkay include:

- Berkay Besler (born 1999), Turkish racing driver
- Berkay Can Değirmencioğlu (born 1993), Turkish footballer
- Berkay Candan (born 1993), Turkish basketball player
- Berkay Dabanlı (born 1990), Turkish-German footballer
- Berkay Onarıcı (born 1987), Turkish footballer
- Berkay Özcan (born 1998), Turkish footballer
- Berkay Sefa Kara (born 1999), Turkish footballer
- Berkay Samancı (born 1989), Turkish footballer
- Berkay Şahin (born 1981), Turkish singer
- Berkay Yılmaz (born 1998), Turkish footballer
