= Seda Sayan =

Turkish singer and actress

- Born: Aysel Gürsaçer; 30 December 1962 (age 63); Eyüpsultan, Istanbul, Turkey
- Education: Çemberlitaş Girls High School
- Occupations: Singer; actress; TV presenter
- Years active: 1978–present
- Spouses: Rıdvan Kılıç (m. 1987; div. 1987) Sinan Engin (m. 1990; div. 1995) Soner Yapcacık (m. 1998; div. 1999) Tuncay Kıratlı (m. 2000; div. 2001) Gökhan Şükür (m. 2004; div. 2005) Onur Şan (m. 2008; div. 2010) Çağlar Ökten (m. 2022)
- Children: 1
- Musical career
- Genres: Fantezi
- Instrument: Vocals
- Labels: Harika; Uzelli; Çınar; Destan; Yaşar; Prestij; Özbir; Avrupa; Son; Seyhan; Erco; DMC; Poll

Seda Sayan (born Aysel Gürsaçer; 30 December 1962) is a Turkish pop folk singer, actress, and TV variety-show hostess.

== Personal life ==
Sayan was born in a poor family so she started working from a very young age. She started performing at the age of 16. She had her date of birth changed via a court decision in 1978 to 4 January 1959, in order to be eligible for performing at a specific venue. In December 2017, she changed her date of birth back to 1962. Her big shot came in 1984 when she played a role in a movie opposite Kadir İnanır.

In 1987, she married Rıdvan Kılıç, a soccer player. The marriage did not last long and they divorced a few months later. She met Sinan Engin in 1989 and they later got married. They had their son Oğulcan Engin in 1990, but the couple divorced in 1995. Sayan was then in a relationship with Mahsun Kırmızıgül, a famous singer, for three years. In 2014, she was sentenced to a 5-year probation and a judicial fine of 6,000 liras for insulting Ankaralı Turgut. On 24 April 2022, she married musician Çağlar Ökten.

== Discography ==
Albums

- 1983: Yandı Pilav Tavası (under the name Aysel Gül)
- 1985: Anılarım
- 1987: Seda Sayan'la Başbaşa
- 1989: Seviyor musun?
- 1990: 80'li Yıllar (featuring Nejat Alp)
- 1990: Ya Benim Olursun
- 1991: Git Demesi Kolay
- 1992: İşte Seda Sayan
- 1993: Yeter ki İste
- 1994: Vız Gelir Her Şey
- 1996: Ah Geceler
- 1997: Sensizliğe Yanarım
- 1999: Ben Sana Demedim mi?
- 2001: Var Mısın?
- 2004: Sıkı Sıkı
- 2005: Bebeğim
- 2007: Gecelerce Ağlarsın Unutma
- 2009: Aşkla
- 2012: Seda Sayan 2012

EPs

- 2014: Hatıran Yeter
- 2017: Seni Seviyorum

Singles

- 2011: "İftira" (feat. Huseyin Karadayi)
- 2012: "Yağmur Altında Eriyorum"
- 2016: "Karagözlüm Ölesim Var"
- 2017: "Tabi Tabi" (feat. Yasin Keleş)
- 2018: "Milletin Duâsı" (with various artists)
- 2018: "Ah Geceler"
- 2019: "Son Sözüm"
- 2019: "Üzülme" (Aşkın'ın Şarkıları)
- 2019: "Keten Helva" (with Sergio Gürlek)
- 2020: "Düşerim"
- 2020: "Gerçekçi Ol" (with Ferat Üngür)
- 2021: "Gel Günaha Girelim" (with Alper Atakan)
- 2022: "Bak Gör"
- 2022: "Bin Dereden Su Getirsem"
- 2023: "Manidar" (with Çağlar Ökten)
- 2023: "Gör Bak" (with Alaaddin Ergün)
- 2023: "Narin Yarim"
- 2024: "Benim Seni Görmem Lazım"
- 2024: "Acı Veriyor"
- 2025: "Kızılca Şerbet" (with Tan Taşçı)

== Filmography ==
=== Film and TV series ===
Year	Title	Role	Notes
1983	Yorgun	Seda	
1984	İmparator	Nevin	
1986	Saide	Güzide	
1986	Kanlı Su		
1993	Üç İstanbul		
1993	Geceler	Seda	
1997	Sırtımdan Vuruldum	Gülnaz	
1999	Evimiz Olacak mı?	Filiz	
2002	Reyting Hamdi	Herself	Supporting role
2002	Hastayım Doktor	Bihter Can	
2004	Yabancı Damat	Herself	Supporting role
2005	Hababam Sınıfı 3,5	Deli Bedriye	
2007	Fedai	Yıldız Akar	
2008	Akasya Durağı	Herself	Supporting role
2012	İkizler Firarda	Ticket seller	
2018	Jet Sosyete	Herself	Episode 20

=== TV programs ===
- Seda - Osman Show, Kanal 6
- Yetiş Bacım, TGRT
- Mahalleler Yarışıyor, TGRT (2000)
- Sabah Sabah Seda Sayan, Kanal D (2001–2006)
- Seda Sayan ile Şans Kapısı, Kanal D (2004)
- Sabahların Sultanı Seda Sayan, Kanal D (2006–2009)
- Susma, Kanal D (2009)
- Yalnız Değilsiniz, Kanal D (2009)
- Sabahın Sedası, Show TV (2010–2011)
- Beyaz'ın Sultanı, Beyaz TV (2011)
- Seda Sultan, TV8 (2012–2013)
- Kaynana Gelin Seda'ya Gelin, Kanal D (2013–2014)
- Seda Sayan Show, Show TV (2014)
- Evleneceksen Gel, Show TV (2015–2017)
- O Ses Türkiye (Turkish version of The Voice), TV8 (2018–2020)
- Yemekteyiz (Turkish version of Come Dine with Me), TV8 (2019–2020)
- Seda Sayan'la Çılgın Sayısal Loto, TV8 (2020–2021)
- Gelinim Mutfakta, Kanal D (2021)
- Sabahın Sultanı Seda Sayan, Star TV (2021–2024)
- Seda Sayan ile Her Şey Masada, TYT Türk (2025–)
