= Dön Ne Olur =

Studio album by Ebru Gündeş
- Released: 24 December 1999
- Genre: Arabesque
- Length: 43:01

Ebru Gündeş chronology
Sen Allah'ın Bir Lutfusun (1998)	Dön Ne Olur (1999)	Ahdım Olsun (2001)

Dön Ne Olur (Please Come Back) is the sixth studio album of Ebru Gündeş, the Turkish pop-folk, actress, and television personality. The album was released in 1999.

== Track listing ==
No.	Title	English translation	Length
1.	"Dön Ne Olur"	Please Come Back	4:56
2.	"Çingenem"	My Gypsy	3:07
3.	"Hata"	Mistake	3:34
4.	"Ben Yokum Bu İşte"	I Am Not in It	3:18
5.	"Annem İçin"	For My Mother	4:53
6.	"Yalan"	Lie	4:55
7.	"Unuturum"	I Will Forget	4:27
8.	"Tutsak"	Captive	3:03
9.	"Affet"	Forgive	3:44
10.	"Deli Deli"	Crazy	4:04
Total length:			43:01
