= Şahane =

Studio album by Ebru Gündeş
- Released: 2003
- Recorded: 2002
- Genre: Arabesque, fantasy
- Length: 71:09
- Label: Erol Köse Production
- Director: Suat Aydoğan
- Producer: Erol Köse

Ebru Gündeş chronology
Ahdım Olsun (2001)	Şahane (2003)	Bize de Bu Yakışır (2004)

Şahane (Great) is the eighth studio album of Ebru Gündeş, the Turkish pop-folk, actress, and television personality. On her album there are of 15 songs. The album was published by Erol Köse Production in 2003. The album yielded the singles "Ceza mı?" and "Alev Alev".

== Track listing ==
No.	Title	English translation	Length
1.	"Biliyorsun"	You Know	4:53
2.	"Ceza Mı?"	Is It A Punishment?	4:43
3.	"Alev Alev"	Ablaze	5:21
4.	"Bir Garip Serçe"	A Peculiar Night	5:55
5.	"Yanar Döner Geceler"	Flip-flopping Nights	4:56
6.	"Herkes Yaralı"	Everyone Is Hurt	5:06
7.	"Erkeksen Söyle"	Say It If You're A Man	5:08
8.	"Sevmekten Gidince"	When You Leave Love	5:25
9.	"Arayı Soğutmayalım"	Let Not Our Affection Fade	3:45
10.	"Ben Olmayınca"	When I Am Gone	3:53
11.	"Mümkünse"	If Possible	4:34
12.	"Anlatamam"	I Can't Explain	5:14
13.	"Ben İnsan Değil Miyim?"	Am I Not Human?	4:33
14.	"Tövbekâr"	Repentful	3:15
15.	"Şahane"	Great	4:28
Total length:			71:09
