= Ahdım Olsun =

Studio album by Ebru Gündeş
- Released: 29 November 2001
- Recorded: 2001
- Genre: Arabesque, pop, classical Turkish
- Length: 61:06
- Language: Turkish
- Label: Universal Müzik, Neşe Müzik
- Producer: Neşe Müzik Production

Ebru Gündeş chronology
Dön Ne Olur (1999)	Ahdım Olsun (2001)	Şahane (2003)

Ahdım Olsun (It's My Vow) is the seventh studio album by Turkish pop-folk singer, actress, and television personality Ebru Gündeş.

The album was published by Neşe Music and the Universal Music-Turkey label in 2001. The first single of the album is Sensizim, with lyrics and music by Altay. The second single was Telafi, which was also highly successful. The third single of the album was named Seni Seviyorum (I Love You). Vazgeçmem, a song written by Yıldız Tilbe, won high critical acclaim in Turkey, after which a new remix version was released. The album also contains a Sezen Aksu cover, as well as an instrumental version of the song Ahdım Olsun.

== Track listing ==
1. Ahdum Olsun – (It is My Vow)
2. Sensizim – (I Am Without You)
3. Akıllı Ol – (Be Smart)
4. Seni Seviyorum – (I Love You)
5. Telafi – (Compensation)
6. Senin Olmaya Geldim – (I Came To Be Yours)
7. Sevdim İnkâr Etmedim – (I Loved, I Did Not Deny)
8. Sabahlar Uzak – (Mornings Are Far)
9. Kaybedenler – (Losers)
10. Allah Seninle Olsun / Sonun Olurum – (Let Allah Be With You / I'll Be Your End)
11. Vazgeçmem – (I Do Not Give Up)
12. Benim Dünyam – (My World)
13. Bir İnat Uğruna / Muallaktayım – (In the Cause of a Dermination / I'm in Suspended)
