= Killing the Shadows =

- Directed by: Ezel Akay
- Starring: Haluk Bilginer; Beyazıt Öztürk
- Release date: 17 February 2006
- Running time: 2h 15min
- Country: Turkey
- Language: Turkish

Killing the Shadows (Turkish: Hacivat Karagöz Neden Öldürüldü?) is a 2006 Turkish historical comedy film directed by Ezel Akay, about the origin story of Karagöz and Hacivat, the two lead characters of the traditional Turkish shadow play.

== Cast ==
- Haluk Bilginer - Karagöz
- Beyazıt Öztürk - Hacivat
- Şebnem Dönmez - Ayşe Hatun
- Güven Kıraç - Kadı Pervane
- Levent Kazak - Dimitri
- Ayşen Gruda - Kam Ana
- Ezel Akay - Süleyman II (Eşrefoğlu)
- Muhittin Korkmaz - Alaeddin Eretna
- Ahmet Sarıcan - Demirtaş
- Mete Horozoğlu - Görevli
- Hasan Ali Mete - Küşteri
- Serdar Gökhan - Köse Mihal
- Ragıp Savaş - Orhan Gazi
- Tansu Biçer - Misak
