= O Ses Türkiye =

- Presented by: Acun Ilıcalı; Alp Kırşan; Zeynep örtkardeşler
- Judges: Hadise; Murat Boz; Mustafa Sandal; Hülya Avşar; Ebru Gündeş; Gökhan Özoğuz; Mazhar Alanson & Özkan Uğur; Hakan Özoğuz; Sibel Can; Yıldız Tilbe; Beyazıt Öztürk; Seda Sayan; Oğuzhan Koç; Melike Şahin
- Country of origin: Turkey
- Original language: Turkish
- No. of seasons: 11

Production
- Producers: Acun Medya; Talpa (2011–2019); ITV Studios (2019–)
- Production location: Istanbul

Original release
- Network: Show TV (1); Star TV (2–3); TV8 (4–)
- Release: October 10, 2011 – present

O Ses Türkiye is a Turkish reality singing competition and local version of The Voice. It started on October 10, 2011. O Ses Türkiye is presented by Acun Ilıcalı (since 2011–2022).

One of the important premises of the show is the quality of singing. Four coaches, themselves popular performing artists, train the contestants in their groups and occasionally perform with them. Talents are selected in blind auditions, where the coaches cannot see, but only hear the contestants (as their backs are turned to the aspiring performer).

== Selection process and format ==
O Ses Türkiye consists of four judges and a presenter. The competition includes five rounds in total.

The coaches' chairs are faced towards the audience during artists' performances; those interested in an artist press their button, which turns their chair towards the artist and illuminates the bottom of the chair to read "O ses sensin" (You're that voice). After the performance, an artist either defaults to the only coach who turned around or selects their coach if more than one coach expresses interest.

The second round is called "Duel". Each coach pairs two of their team members to perform together, and then chooses one to advance in the competition.

If the contestants are chosen for the 3rd round of the competition, they will be eligible to move to the next round and their performances will be broadcast live. In this round, each team's remaining contestants will compete against three or four competitors every week. After the live performances of the competitors, the results will be determined through the SMS votes. In each team, the person with the most votes is eligible to contest in the following week. The fate of the last two remaining contestants will be determined by the judges. The judges' votes give one of the competitors the right to contest at the next level. This round continues until the remaining two people from each team are determined.

In the semi-final round, a total of two contestants from each team will compete in eight phases. After contestants sang their songs, the judges score their performances. The results of SMS voting will be added to the judges' score and the ones who reach 100 points will be eligible to compete in the final round.

In the final round, the remaining four contestants compete against each other. After the elimination of the fourth one, the remaining contestants will sing their songs again, and the third place will be decided according to the results of a new SMS voting. The final phase is between the two competitors whose performances will be rated through the votes, and as a result, the competitor with the most votes in the contest will become the champion of O Ses Türkiye, and his/her judge's team will be chosen as the champion team.

== Series overview ==
O Ses Türkiye series overview
Season	Aired	Winner	Runner-up	Third place	Fourth place	Fifth place	Sixth place	Winning coach	Presenters	Coaches (chairs' order)			
Season	Aired	Winner	Runner-up	Third place	Fourth place	Fifth place	Sixth place	Winning coach	Presenters	1	2	3	4
1	2011-2012	Oğuz Berkay Fidan	İbrahim Şevki	Fatma İşcan	Bihter Erkmen	Without fifth and sixth finalists		Murat Boz	Acun Ilıcalı, Alp Kırşan	Hadise	Mustafa	Hülya	Murat
2	2012-2013	Mustafa Bozkurt	Ayda Mosharraf	Onur Uğuş	Berkan Taşkın	Without fifth and sixth finalists		Mustafa Sandal	Acun Ilıcalı, Alp Kırşan	Hadise	Mustafa	Hülya	Murat
3	2013-2014	Hasan Doğru	Abdullah Civliz	Ersin Yılmaz	Mert Demir	Without fifth and sixth finalists		Gökhan Özoğuz	Acun Ilıcalı, Alp Kırşan	Gökhan	Hadise	Murat	Ebru
4	2014-2015	Elnur Hüseynov	Kaya Aslantepe	Emrah Güllü	Zeo Jaweed	Without fifth and sixth finalists		Ebru Gündeş	Acun Ilıcalı, Zeynep Dörtkardeşler	Gökhan	Hadise	Mazhar & Özkan	Ebru
5	2015-2016	Emre Sertkaya	Türkan Kürşad	Aziz Kiraz	Tankurt Manas	Without fifth and sixth finalists		Gökhan & Hakan	Acun Ilıcalı, Zeynep Dörtkardeşler	Gökhan & Hakan	Hadise	Murat	Ebru
6	2016-2017	Dodan Özer	Resul Aydemir	Keremhan Özdemir	Burhan Çatılı	Taylan Bayri	Cihangir Moralı	Hadise	Acun Ilıcalı, Zeynep Dörtkardeşler	Gökhan & Hakan	Hadise	Murat	Sibel
7	2017-2018	Lütfiye Özipek	Yener Bulut & Ümit Durak	Nihat Mugil	Aydan Kahraman	Oğulcan Bolcan	Ceren Düzova	Gökhan Özoğuz	Acun Ilıcalı, Zeynep Dörtkardeşler	Gökhan	Hadise	Murat	Yıldız
8	2018-2019	Ferat Üngür	Umut Kaç	Barış & Baran	Gülce Kahtalı	Bartu Gülhan	Anıl Şimşek	Murat Boz	Acun Ilıcalı, Zeynep Dörtkardeşler	Murat	Hadise	Beyaz	Seda
9	2019-2020	Alkan Dalgakıran	Uygar Erdoğan	Soner Kip	Eyüp Aylar	Turgut Çıngı	Eyüp Sultan Aylar	Seda Sayan	Acun Ilıcalı, Zeynep Dörtkardeşler	Murat	Hadise	Beyaz	Seda
10	2021-2022	Hasan Koçak	Devrim Seyrek	Hakki İlek	Mustafa Açikgöz	Mert Yenihayat	Şevval Ekiz	Oğuzhan Koç	Acun Ilıcalı	Oğuzhan	Beyaz	Ebru	Murat
11	2025	Mert Özer	Funda Kayacık	Polen Sena Yıldızoğlu	Ertuğrul Hayrullah			Gökhan Özoğuz	Saadet Özsırkıntı	Gökhan	Hadise	Beyaz	Melike

== Coaches ==
Coach	Seasons										
Coach	1	2	3	4	5	6	7	8	9	10	11
Hadise											
Murat Boz											
Hülya Avşar											
Mustafa Sandal											
Gökhan Özoğuz											
Gökhan Özoğuz & Hakan Özoğuz											
Ebru Gündeş											
Mazhar Alanson & Özkan Uğur											
Sibel Can											
Yıldız Tilbe											
Beyazıt Öztürk											
Seda Sayan											
Oğuzhan Koç											
Melike Şahin											

Coaches gallery

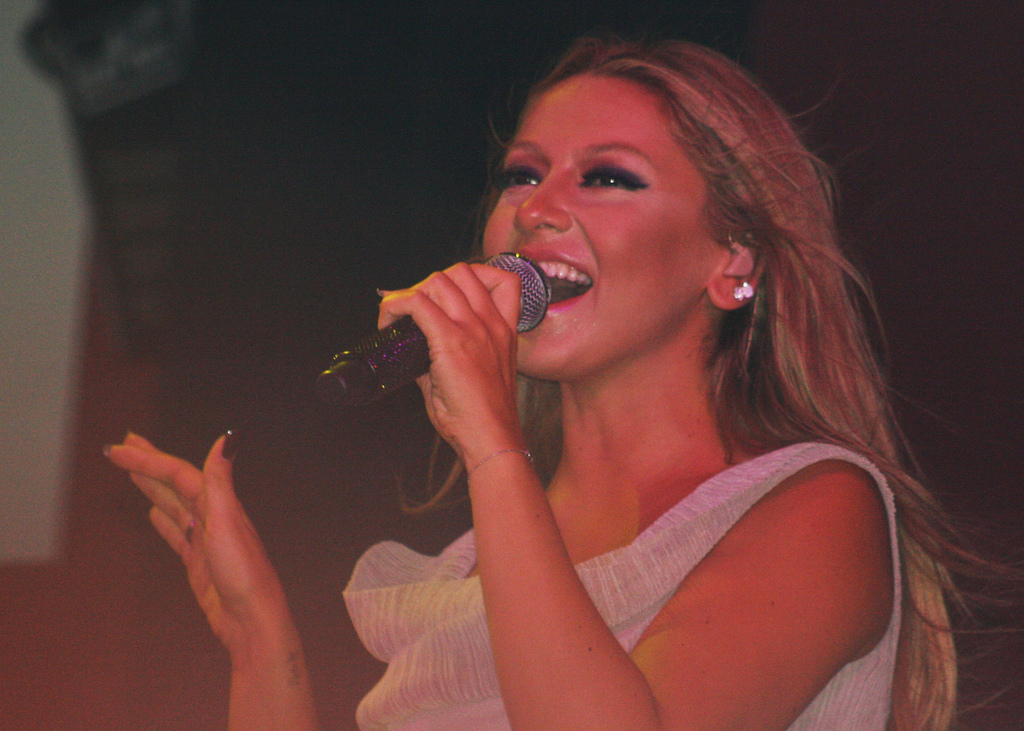
Hadise (2011–2020, 2025–)

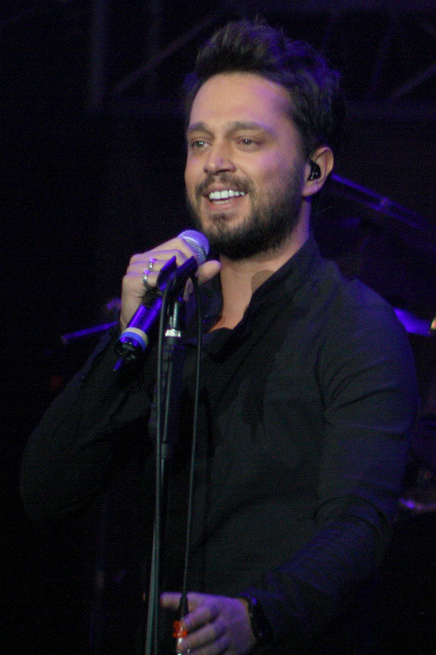
Murat Boz (2011–2013; 2015–2021)

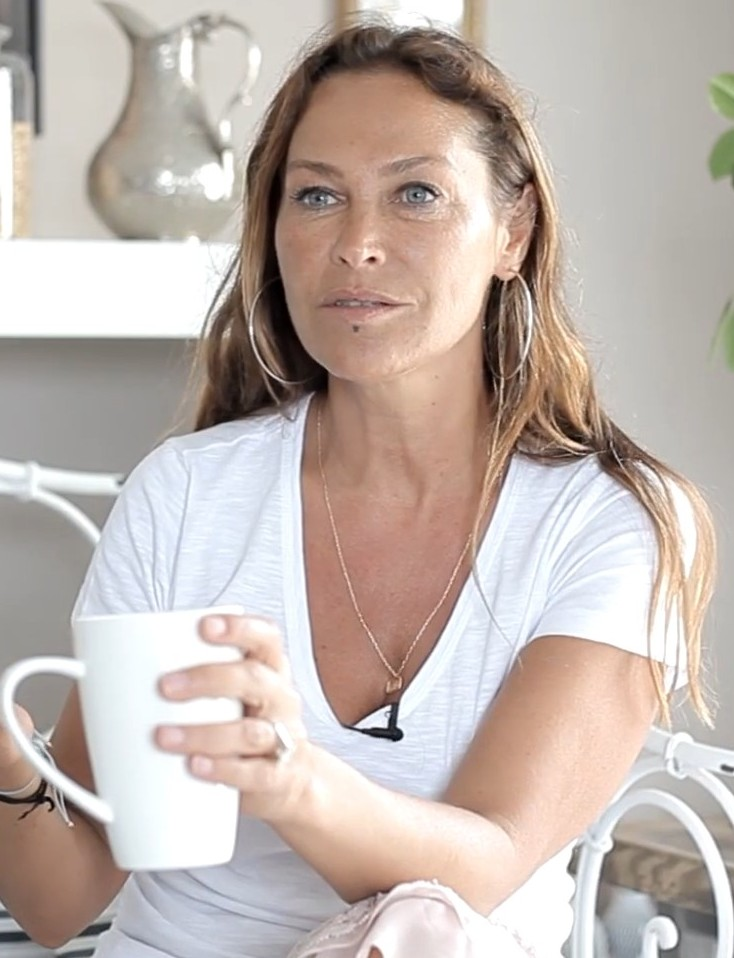
Hülya Avşar (2011–2012)

Mustafa Sandal (2011–2012)

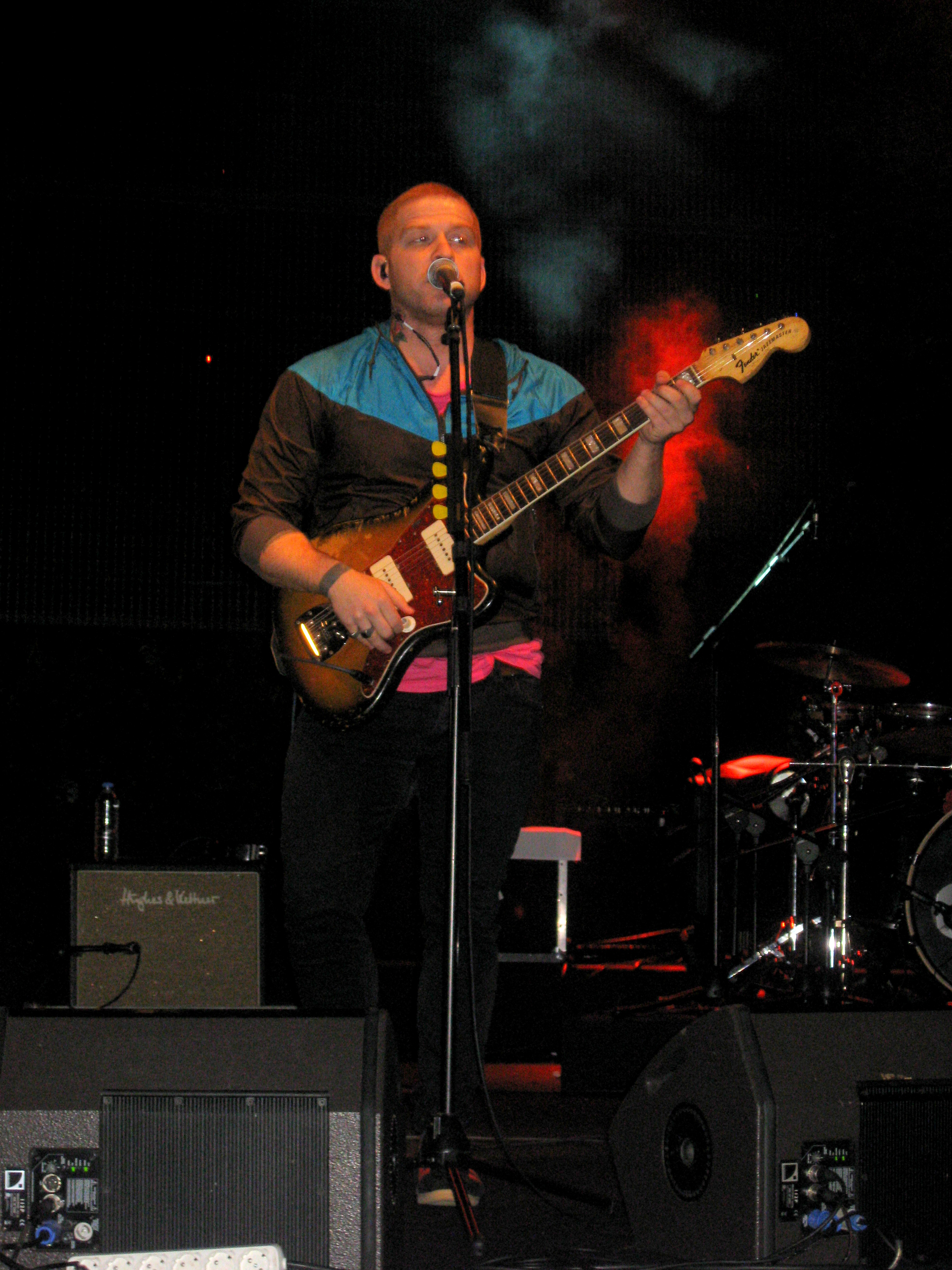
Gökhan Özoğuz (solo: 2013–2014, 2017; duo: 2015–2016, 2025–)

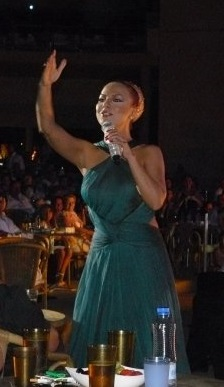
Ebru Gündeş (2013–2015, 2021)

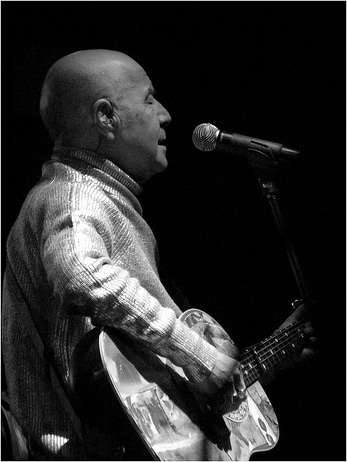
Mazhar Alanson (duo, 2014)

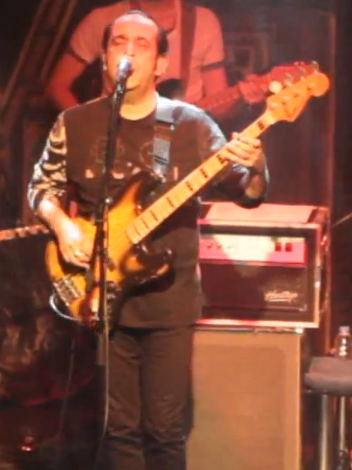
Özkan Uğur (duo, 2014)

Hakan Özoğuz (duo, 2015–2016)

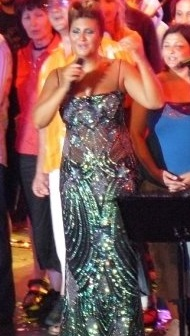
Sibel Can (2016)

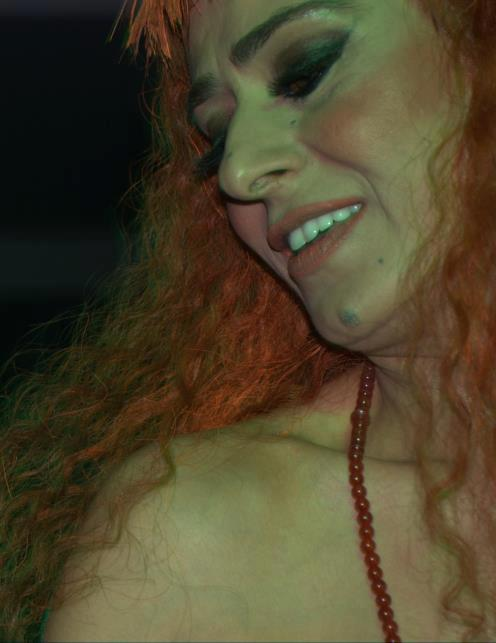
Yıldız Tilbe (2017)

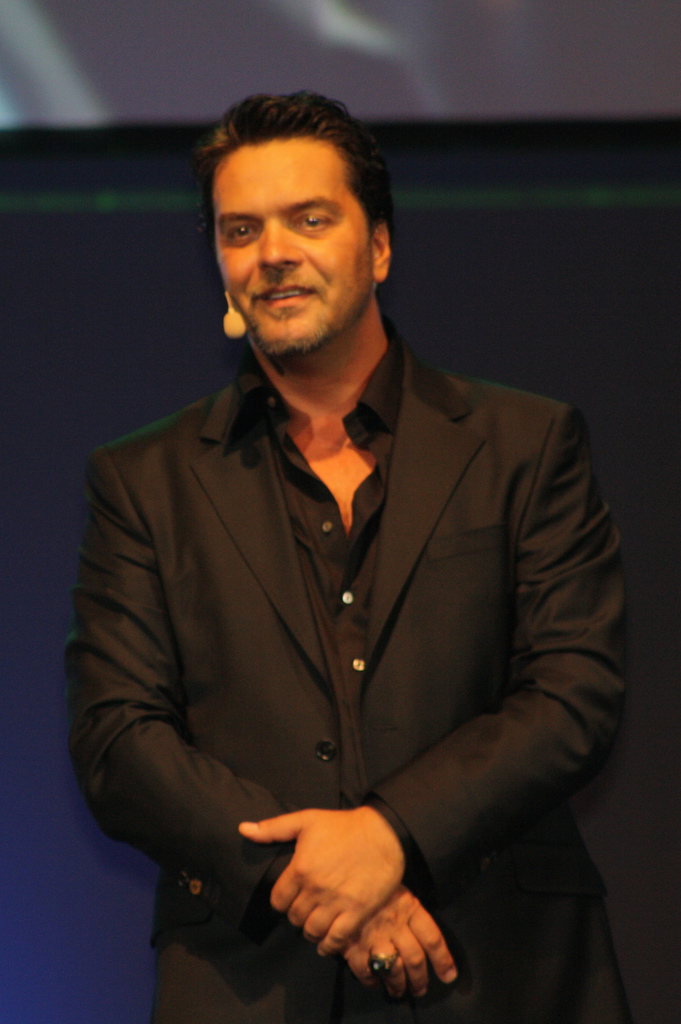
Beyazıt Öztürk (2018–)

Seda Sayan (2018–2019)

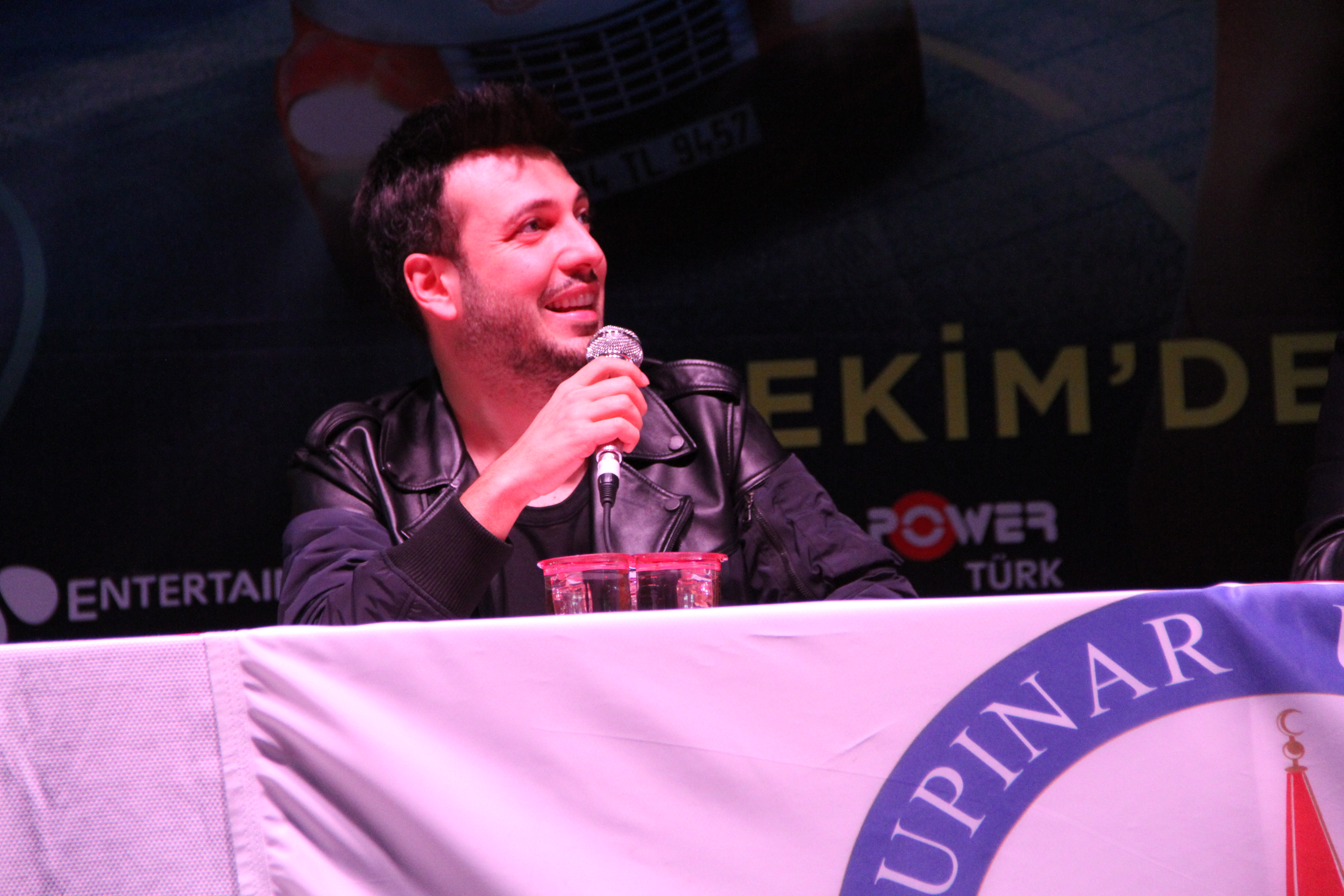
Oğuzhan Koç (2021)

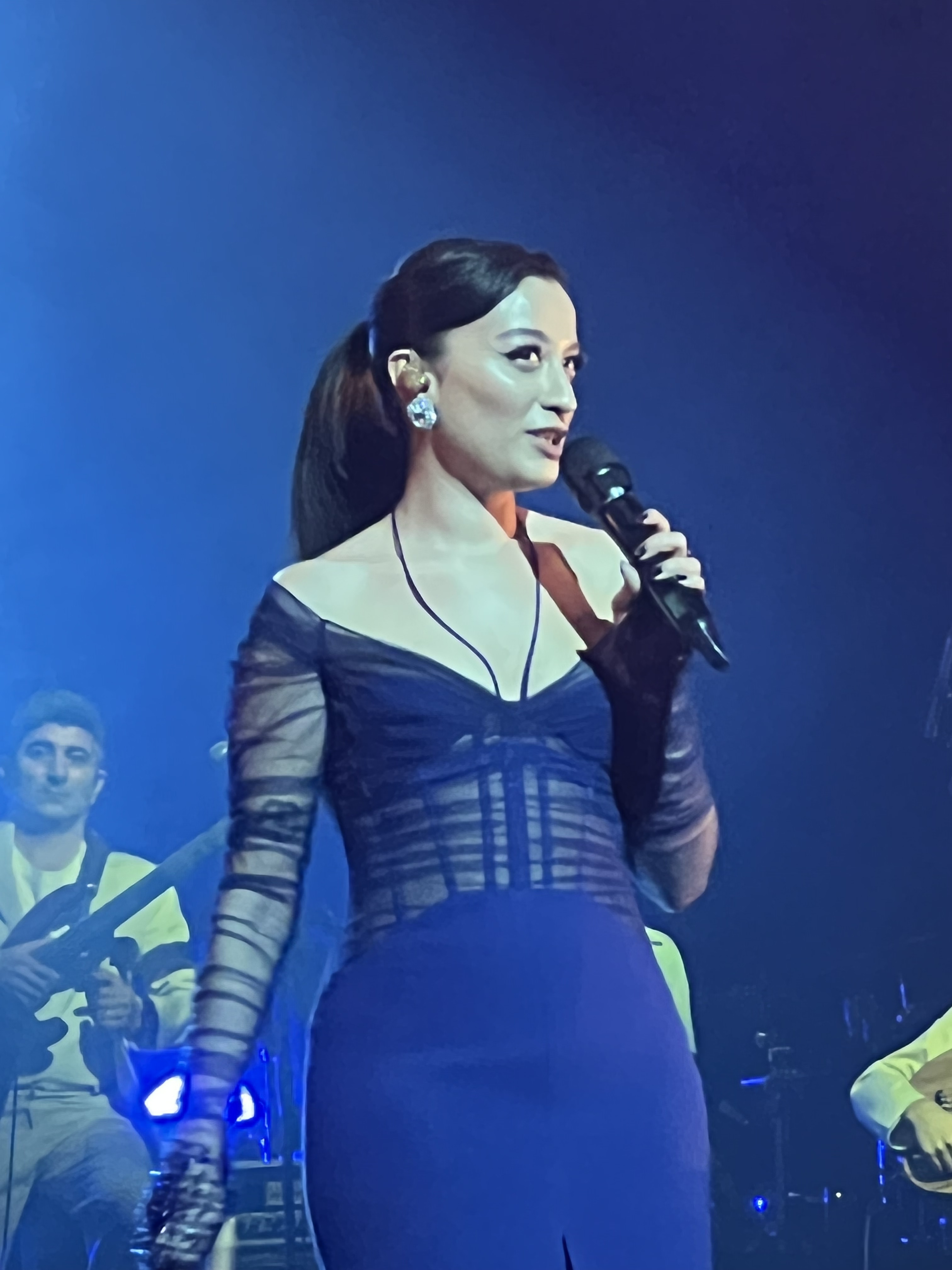
Melike Şahin (2025–)

== Season synopses ==
- Winner coach
- Runner-up
- Third place
- Fourth place

Winners are in bold, eliminated artists in smaller font. Final contestants listed first. Finalists are italicised.

Season	Coaches and their finalists			
1	Hadise	Hülya Avşar	Murat Boz	Mustafa Sandal
1	Bihter Erkmen; Gizem Coşkun; Gökçe Özgül; Gökhan Koç	Fatma İşcan; Barış Ekmen; Emran Uğur Yurum; İrem Derici	**Oğuz Berkay Fidan**; Melis Kar; Melek Nur Katırcıoğlu; Erman Taylan Baykal	İbrahim Şevki; Dilek Özak; Cansu Ceren Gönen; Bora Gölbaşı
2	Selin Ataş; Burcu Demirtaş; Samet Nohut; Aydan Ceren Yolcu	Onur Uğuş; Eren Şenay; Mümtaz Ateş; Duygu Karakuş	Ayda Mosharraf; Berkan Taşkın; Ertunç Tuncer; Çağrı Emrah Yıldırım	**Mustafa Bozkurt**; Erkam Aydar; Efe Dumancı; Cansu Çebi
3	Hadise	Ebru Gündeş	Murat Boz	Gökhan Özoğuz
3	Tuğba Tufantepe; Emrah Uçar; Ali Köse; Ceylan Koynat	Anıl Can; Bianca Dudaksız; Cüneyt Yıldarı; Soyhan Bilgeer	Rıza Sarıtaş; Soner Kıp; Melissa Aydın; Anıl Durmuş	**Hasan Doğru**; Abdullah Civliz; Ersin Yılmaz; Mert Demir
4	Hadise	Ebru Gündeş	Mazhar Alanson & Özkan Uğur	Gökhan Özoğuz
4	Zeo Jaweed; Sarper Arda Akkaya; Cihan Polatol; Fatih Gündüz	**Elnur Hüseynov**; Sahil Ekmekçi; Anıl Şimşek; Hasan Şahinsoy	Osman Vahit Özdal; Serkan Soyak; Ceyda Tezemir; Anıl Gündüz; Seçil Gür	Kaya Aslantepe; Emrah Güllü; Muhammet Vanal; Yana Soloman
5	Hadise	Ebru Gündeş	Murat Boz	Gökhan & Hakan Özoğuz
5	Aziz Kiraz	Tankurt Manas; Busegül Yalçın; Ercan Tok; Onur Baytan	Ali Mert Habipoğlu; Berkin Bekret	**Emre Sertkaya**; Türkan Kürşad; Alpaslan Adsay; Ali Dağaşan; Tamay Özaltun; Yusuf Yüksek
6	Hadise	Sibel Can	Murat Boz	Gökhan & Hakan Özoğuz
6	**Dodan Özer**; Taylan Bayri; Cihangir Moralı; Joker; Sevil Memetova; Şeyda Erbaş Kasap	Burhan Çatılı	Armador; Karima Gouit; Toprak Kardeşler	Resul Aydemir; Keremhan Özdemir; Abdul Jabbar Din; Enis Uğurlu; Suami Ramirez
7	Hadise	Yıldız Tilbe	Murat Boz	Gökhan Özoğuz
7	Oğulcan Bolcan	Ceren Düzova	Nihat Mugil; Aydan Kahraman	**Lütfiye Özipek**; Yener Bulut & Ümit Durak
8	Hadise	Seda Sayan	Murat Boz	Beyazıt Öztürk
8	Anıl Şimşek		**Ferat Üngür**; Bartu Gülhan	Umut Kaç; Gülce Kahtalı; Barış & Baran Solar
9	Hadise	Seda Sayan	Murat Boz	Beyazıt Öztürk
9	Eyüp Sultan Aylar; Biran Ceren	**Alkan Dalgakıran**	Turgut Çıngı	Uygar Erdoğan; Soner Kip
10	Oğuzhan Koç	Beyazıt Öztürk	Ebru Gündeş	Murat Boz
10	**Hasan Koçak**; Şevval Ekiz	Devrim Seyrek; Mert Yenihayat	Mustafa Açikgöz	Hakki İlek
11	Gökhan Özoğuz	Hadise	Beyazıt Öztürk	Melike Şahin

== O Ses Çocuklar ==
O Ses Çocuklar was the Turkish version of The Voice Kids, designed for children of age from 7 to 14 years old. O Ses Çocuklar shares the same format with the adult version O Ses Türkiye but has some differences. In the midst of preparations for the 2016 edition, it was reported that RTÜK threatened to cancel the series, stating that the format "contains content that could harm the physical, mental, or moral development of children".

=== Coaches' timeline ===
Coaches	Seasons											
Coaches	1	2	3	4	5	6	7	8	9	10	11	12
Hadise												
Murat Boz												
Mustafa Ceceli												
Oğuzhan Koç												
Burak Kut												

=== Coaches and their finalists ===
- – Winning Coach/Contestant. Winners are in bold, eliminated contestants in small font.
- – Runner-Up Coach/Contestant. Final contestant first listed.
- – Third Place Coach/Contestant. Final contestant first listed.
- – Fourth Place Coach/Contestant. Final contestant first listed.

Season	Coaches and their finalists			
1	Hadise	Murat Boz	Mustafa Ceceli	—N/a
1	**Şahin Kendirci**; Alvi Moreno	Ogün Can Kaya; Zehra Toy	Umutcan Türkeri; Selim Yaşa	—N/a
2	Hadise	Murat Boz	Mustafa Ceceli	Oğuzhan Koç
2	Sude Öz; Güven Yıldırım	Evin Bal; Haktan Akarçeşme	Mehmet Çağdaş Bozkurt; Okan Kayın	**Bade Karakoç**; Güneş Taşkıtran
3	Hadise	Oğuzhan Koç	Burak Kut	—N/a
3	**Derin Yeğin**	Umut Yolcu Yılmaz	Atilla Memedov	—N/a

=== Series overview ===
Team Hadise
Team Murat Boz
Team Mustafa Ceceli
Team Oğuzhan Koç
Team Burak Kut

O Ses Çocuklar series overview
Season	First aired	Last aired	Winner	Runner-up	Third place	Fourth place	Winning coach	Presenters		Coaches (chairs' order)				Network
Season	First aired	Last aired	Winner	Runner-up	Third place	Fourth place	Winning coach	Presenters		1	2	3	4	Network
1	21 June 2014	15 July 2014	Şahin Kendirci	Ogün Can Kaya	Umutcan Türkeri	—N/a	Hadise	Jess Molho	Sinem Yalçinkaya	Mustafa C.	Hadise	Murat	—N/a	Star TV
2	1 Sep 2015	24 Sep 2015	Bade Karakoç	Sude Öz	Evin Bal	Mehmet Çağdaş Bozkurt	Oğuzhan Koç	Jess Molho	Zeynep Dörtkardeşler	Mustafa C.	Hadise	Murat	Oğuzhan	TV8
3 (Note: This season was recorded in 2016 but was not released until 2018.)	3 June 2016	12 Aug 2016	Derin Yeğin	Atilla Memedov	Umut Yolcu Yılmaz	—N/a	Hadise	Jess Molho	Zeynep Dörtkardeşler	Burak	Hadise	Oğuzhan	—N/a	TV8
4

== Rap version ==
O Ses Türkiye Rap is the first The Voice version that focuses on rapping artists. The first season premiered on 19 March 2021, with coaches Eypio, Hadise, Mero, and Murda, on the channel Exxen. For the second season, rapper Sefo joined the coaching panel, while Mero and Murda turned into a duo coach. For both seasons, Heja is the presenter of the show.

=== Series overview ===
Warning: the following table presents a significant amount of different colors.

O Ses Türkiye Rap series overview
Season	First aired	Last aired	Winner	Runner-up	Third place	Fourth place	Winning coach	Presenter	Coaches (chairs' order)				Network
Season	First aired	Last aired	Winner	Runner-up	Third place	Fourth place	Winning coach	Presenter	1	2	3	4	Network
1	19 Mar 2021	24 June 2021	Ekin Koşar	Burak Svebtek	Mehmet Dgerdion	Fatma Huylit	Mero	Heja	Eypio	Hadise	Mero	Murda	Exxen
2	2 Jun 2023	21 July 2023	Eray Ünal	TBA			Sefo	Heja	Murda & Mero	Hadise	Sefo	Eypio	Exxen
