= Beyaz Show =

Turkish talk show

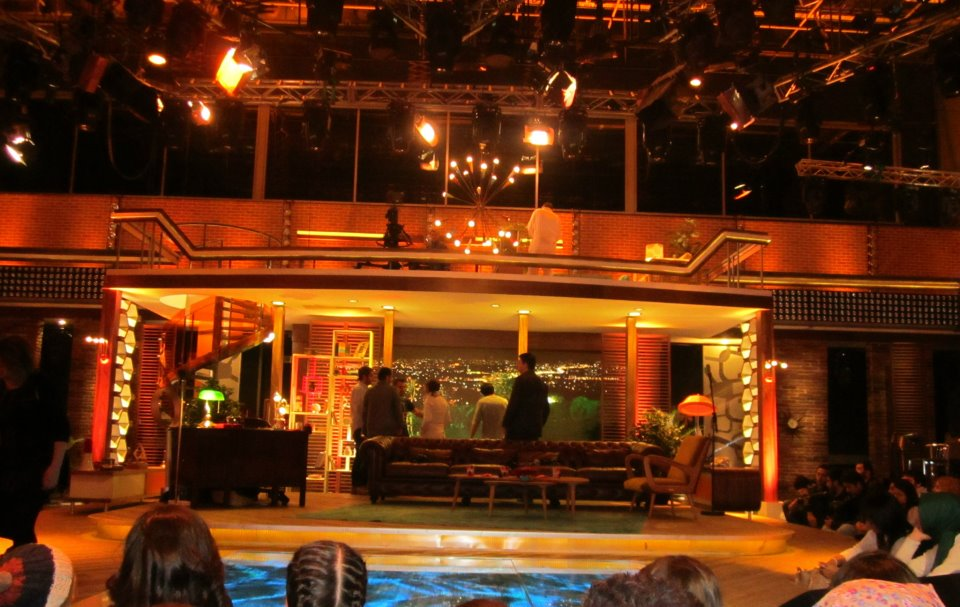
The set used for the show in 2013

Beyaz Show is a televised celebrity interview talk show hosted by Turkish personality Beyazıt Öztürk (also known as "Beyaz"). The show first aired on Kanal D in December 1996. It was awarded Best Talk Show at the 34th Golden Butterfly Awards in 2007.
