= Beyazıt Öztürk =

Turkish television personality (born 1969)

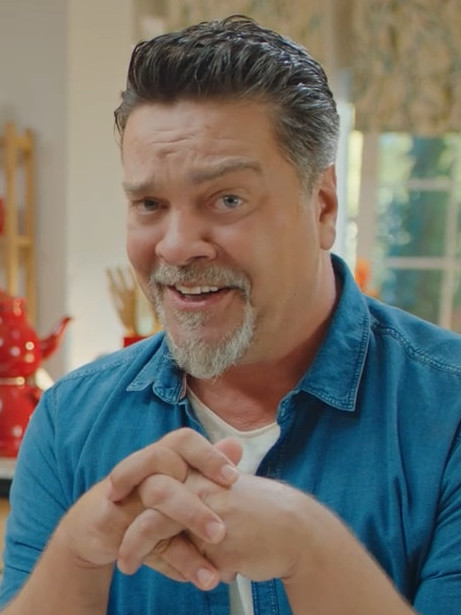
- Öztürk in 2020
- Born: 12 March 1969 (age 56); Bolu, Turkey
- Other names: Beyaz
- Occupation: Television presenter
- Years active: 1995–present
- Known for: Beyaz Show

Beyazıt Öztürk (born 12 March 1969), also known as Beyaz, is a Turkish television personality, standup comedian and actor. He was the host of Beyaz Show, a popular Turkish talk show. In 2018, he became one of the judges on O Ses Türkiye, the Turkish version of The Voice. He is best known for hit sitcom Yalan Dünya and biogragraphy film Hacivat Karagöz Neden Öldürüldü.

== Biography ==
Öztürk was born in Bolu, Turkey in 1969 and spent most of his childhood in Bursa. He is of Georgian descent by his father. His maternal family is of Turkish descent who immigrated from Bulgaria.

He graduated from the Sculpturing Department of Fine Arts from the Anadolu University in Eskişehir. He started his career as a radio and later talk show host on television and has also worked as an actor and musician. Öztürk is best known as a talk show host, most prominently of the Beyaz Show that airs since December 1996 on the Turkish channel Kanal D.

== Career ==
Öztürk started his career at Number 1 TV. He began hosting a late night show in 1996 called 'Beyaz Show'. Öztürk also works as a musician and actor and has recorded his debut album called "Beyaz, Türküler" in 1998.

== January 2016 controversy ==
On 8 January 2016, on an episode of Beyaz Show a woman who introduced herself as Ayşe Çelik called the program as a guest and said: "Are you aware of what happened in eastern Turkey and in the southeast? Here unborn children, mothers and people are killed; a large fraction of these criminals are the state and military". Öztürk's urging to people to applaud for this note brought about a lot of reactions. On the following day, 9 January 2016, Kanal D released a statement. It was stated that the person who had called the program had initially stated that she wanted to ask some questions from the artists present on stage, but instead she had done something totally different, trying to provoke a response from the guests and audience which was not the channel's intention. According to the Ministry of National Education the person who called the program was a student. Öztürk also appeared on the Kanal D news to discuss the issue. "I'm the child of a police", I'm amazed and sorry... I could not pay attention to what the caller was saying in live broadcast," he said Bakırköy Chief Public Prosecutor's Office announced that it was investigating Beyazıt Öztürk and Beyaz Show for spreading terror propaganda. It was stated that the person who had called the program during the live broadcast was also included in the investigation. On 11 January 2016, the person was found living in Diyarbakır and was taken into police custody. Ayşe Çelik was released after being questioned by the police. After all these events, Beyaz Show's new episode aired on 15 January 2016, with Öztürk pointing to his heart in his opening speech and saying: "I vaguely thank the people who know me by their heart". In the following hours, a group of audience started chanting 'Ayşe Öğretmen is not alone' during the live broadcast, and they were removed from the studio. As a result, Öztürk ended the program earlier than usual.

== Radio and TV programs ==
Contests
Year	Program	Network	Notes
2009	Aileler Yarışıyor	Star TV	Presenter
2009	Ucunda 1 Milyon Var	Star TV	Presenter
2009	Yetenek Sizsiniz Türkiye	Show TV	Guest judge
2010	Yok Böyle Dans	Show TV	Guest judge
2018	Gel Konuşalım	TV8	Guest appearance
2018–	O Ses Türkiye	TV8	Judge

Daily programs
Year	Program	Network	Notes
1996–2017	Beyaz Show	Presenter	
2006–2007	Biri Bana Anlatsın	NTV	Co-presenter
2007–2009	Nası Yani?	CNN Türk	Co-presenter

=== Other works ===
Title
Pişti
(Show TV, 2006)
Başka Yerde Yok
(2006, episode 1)

== Filmography ==
Film
Year	Title	Role
1997	Nihavend Mucize	
2001	Dansöz	
2002	Sır Çocukları	
2005	O Şimdi Mahkum	Beyaz
2006	Hacivat Karagöz Neden Öldürüldü?	Hacivat
2011	Eyyvah Eyvah 2	Himself

Television
Year	Title	Role
2002	Biz Size Aşık Olduk	Cem
2004	Karım ve Annem	Levent
2009	Kurtlar Vadisi Pusu	Beyazıt
2012–14	Yalan Dünya	Rıza Kocabaş
2018	Jet Sosyete	Himself

== Theatre ==
Year	Title	Notes
2005	Yıldızların Altında	Musical show

== Discography ==
Year	Album
1997	Beyaz Türküler
