= Berkay Yılmaz (footballer, born 1998) =

Turkish footballer

Personal information
- Date of birth: 28 August 1998 (age 28)
- Place of birth: Karabük, Turkey
- Height: 1.82 m (6 ft 0 in)
- Position: Defender

Team information
- Current team: Karabük İdman Yurdu
- Number: 6

Youth career
- 2011–2018: Kardemir Karabükspor

Senior career*
Years	Team	Apps	(Gls)
2018–2020	Kardemir Karabükspor	30	(0)
2020–2021	Bayrampaşaspor	0	(0)
2021	Malatya Yeşilyurt Belediyespor	1	(0)
2021–2022	Burhaniye Belediyespor		
2022–	Karabük İdman Yurdu	1	(0)
- * Club domestic league appearances and goals ‡ National team caps and goals as of 23 September 2023

Berkay Yılmaz (born 28 August 1998) is a Turkish professional footballer who plays as a defender for TFF Third League club Karabük İdman Yurdu.

== Professional career ==
Yılmaz is a youth product of Kardemir Karabükspor, having joined their youth academy in 2011. He made his professional debut for Kardemir Karabükspor in a 5–0 Süper Lig loss to Göztepe S.K. on 27 April 2018. In the summer of 2020 he transferred to Bayrampaşaspor. Unable to start due to injury, he transferred to Malatya Yeşilyurtspor on 2 February 2021.
