= Ebru Gündeş =

Turkish musical artist

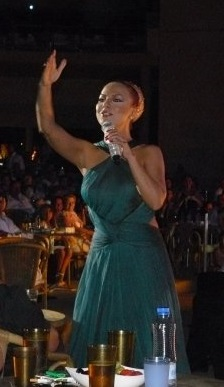
- Gündeş in 2011
- Born: 12 October 1974 (age 51); Istanbul Turkey
- Occupations: Singer; TV show host; actress
- Years active: 1992–present
- Spouses: Hamdi Vardar (m. 1990; div. 1993); Ömer Durak (m. 2002; div. 2003); Reza Zarrab (m. 2010; div. 2021); Murat Osman Özdemir (m. 2024; div. 2025)
- Children: 1
- Musical career
- Genres: Turkish pop; Arabesque; Fantasy; Classical Turkish
- Labels: Raks; Universal; Erol Köse; Emre; Blue
- Website: ebrugundes.com.tr

Ebru Gündeş (Turkish pronunciation: [ebˈɾu ɟynˈdeʃ], born 12 October 1974) is a Turkish pop-folk and arabesque singer, actress, and television personality.

== Career ==
Her debut album, Tanrı Misafiri, was released in 1993, and was successful, selling 1,250,000 copies nationwide. At this stage, she was regarded as a very sweet and innocent-looking girl, slim, dressed in white and with a habit of raising one eyebrow. She was seen on billboards all over Istanbul. Her subsequent albums have also been successful. She won the best Turkish Classical Music Artist award of Kral TV in 1994, 1995 and 1996.

Gündeş released her fifth studio album Sen Allah'ın Bir Lütfusun in 1998. On 5 April 1998, the album ranked among the top 10 on MÜ-YAP''s list of 50 best-selling albums, and on 25 April and 2 May it rose to the second position on the list of pop albums sold by Megavizyon and Mephisto music markets. For the album's first music video, Gündeş was accompanied by the Nigerian footballer and Fenerbahçe S.K. defender Uche Okechukwu. She has had serious health problems. She suffered from a cerebral haemorrhage in December 1999, while recording Dön Ne Olur. After two operations, Ebru eventually returned to full health. Dön Ne Olur was one of the best-selling albums of all time in Turkey. In November 2001, she released the album Ahdım Olsun. It was followed by Şahane (2003), Bize de Bu Yakışır (2004), Kaçak (2006) and Evet (2008).

Ebru Gündeş then released another album, Beyaz ("White") in 2011. The album was unsuccessful, selling just over 100,000 throughout the year. In 2012, she released the album 13.5, which consisted only of covers of old popular songs. The album reached average sales in the country. However, the general perception of music critics had been one of disappointment, as the album consisted solely of covers and was therefore considered to be 'repetition'. In October 2014, her fourteenth studio album, Araftayım, was released. The album sold more than 100,000 copies.

Gündeş's fifteenth studio album Âşık was released by Blue Music on 31 January 2019. According to the data provided by Apple Music, it became the best-selling and most-downloaded album in Turkey on its day of release. The song "Aşık" also broke the record of the most downloaded song on its day of publication in Turkey. Three separate music videos were release for the songs "Âşık", "Gidiniz" and "Çabuk Unutma".

=== Television career ===
Ebru Gündeş has made hundreds of television appearances in Turkey as a singer and as an actress in the comedy series İmkansız Aşk (Impossible Love). She was also the host of Mega Show, which was one of the most popular television shows in Turkey. Every week Ebru was joined by a variety of other Turkish singers, most notably her long-time friends Serdar Ortaç and İbrahim Tatlıses. The show featured Ebru singing her own songs, singing classic songs and singing duets with other singers. She then appeared in the hugely popular singing contest Popstar Alaturka as a judge alongside some of Turkey's most popular singers, namely Bülent Ersoy and Orhan Gencebay and TV presenter Armağan Çağlayan. Just before leaving Popstar Alaturka, she released the album Evet (Yes).

In 2010, Gündeş who was presenting a television program on TGRT at the time, repeatedly performed a song based on verses from Ataol Behramoğlu's poem Yaşadıklarımdan öğrendiğim bir şey var, without asking permission or paying for the copyright. Behramoğlu later filed a lawsuit against Gündeş, the program's producer and broadcaster for violating his rights, asking for compensation due to material and moral damages.

She was also a judge on O Ses Türkiye (Turkish version of The Voice) from 2013 to 2016, and again from 2021 to 2022.

== Personal life ==
At the age of 16 Gündeş married Hamdi Vardar. In 2002 she married, Ömer Durak, a lawyer. Her third marriage was to Iranian Azerbaijani businessman Reza Zarrab in 2010. They have one daughter. Reza Zarrab was arrested on 17 December 2013 by Istanbul police in light of a corruption scandal, which involved some members of the AKP being accused of giving bribes totaling 63 million dollars to government ministers or their proxies. Ebru Gündeş reportedly filed for divorce in September 2016, but they reconciled shortly afterwards. In April 2021, Gündeş again filed for divorce. Their divorce was finalized on 7 May 2021. Gündeş married businessman Murat Osman Özdemir in February 2024 in Dubai. They divorced in September 2025.

== Discography ==
=== Albums ===
Year	Album	Label
1993	Tanrı Misafiri	Raks Müzik
1994	Tatlı Bela	Raks Müzik
1995	Ben Daha Büyümedim	Raks Müzik
1996	Kurtlar Sofrası	Raks Müzik
1998	Sen Allah'ın Bir Lütfusun	Raks Müzik
1999	Dön Ne Olur	Universal Müzik
2001	Ahdım Olsun	Universal Müzik
2003	Şahane	Erol Köse Production
2004	Bize de Bu Yakışır	Emre Plak
2006	Kaçak	Emre Plak
2008	Evet	Emre Plak
2011	Beyaz	Emre Plak
2012	13,5	Emre Plak
2014	Araftayım	Emre Plak
2019	Âşık	Blue Music
2023	Aşığım Hâlâ	Blue Music

=== Singles ===
Year	Single	Label
2011	"Bir Gün Olacak (Remix)"	Emre Plak
2022	"Sonsuza Dek" (with Murat Boz)	blue Music

== Filmography ==
=== As actress ===
Year	Title	Role	Notes
1994	Tanrı Misafiri	Elif Altan	episode 13
1995	Fırtınalar	Ebru Gündeş	episode 42
1997	Deli Divane	Ebru	episode 34
1998	Sen Allahın Bir Lütfusun	Ebru	episode 15
1999	Affet Beni		episode 2
2006	İmkansız Aşk	Ece Güneş	episode 9

=== TV programs ===
Year	Title	Network
1996	Ebru ile Emrah Şov	Kanal D
1999	Dön Ne Olur	
1999–2000	Ebru Gündeş'le İkinci Hayat	TGRT
2003–2004	Ebru Gündeş Show	TGRT
2006	Ebru Gündeş Mega Show	TGRT
2006–2008	Popstar Alaturka	Star TV
2013–2016 2021–	O Ses Türkiye	Star TV & TV8
