= Öykü =

- Gender: Female
- Language: Turkish

Origin
- Origin: Turkish
- Meaning: Story

Öykü (Turkish pronunciation: [øj.ˈcy]) is a feminine Turkish given name. In Turkish, "öykü" means "story". Notable people with the name include:

== People ==
=== Given name ===
- Öykü Çelik (born 1987), Turkish actress
- Öykü Gürman (born 1982), Turkish singer
- Öykü Karayel (born 1990), Turkish actress
- Öykü Serter (born 1975), Turkish TV presenter
