= Duygu Özaslan =

Turkish YouTube personality

Duygu Özaslan Mutaf
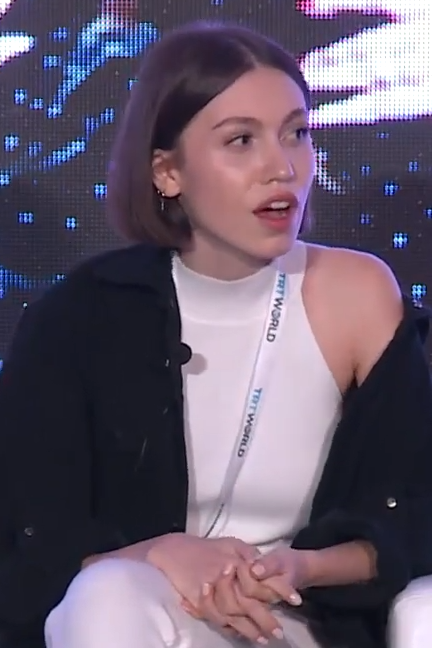
- Özaslan in 2020
- Born: Duygu Özaslan; 17 April 1991 (age 35); Istanbul, Turkey
- Occupation: Influencer
- Spouse: Can Maxim Mutaf (m. 2022)

YouTube information
- Channel: Duygu Özaslan
- Years active: 2013–present
- Genres: Makeup; vlog
- Subscribers: 1.38 million
- Views: 392 million
- Last updated: 4 August 2026

Duygu Özaslan Mutaf (born Duygu Özaslan, 17 April 1991) is a Turkish beauty YouTuber and Internet celebrity. Özaslan is a dropout of the faculty of Spanish Language and Literature in Istanbul University. She generally publishes makeup videos, but over time, her style of content has diversified to include vlogs and lifestyle videos.

== Reception ==
In a 2017 study, it was reported that the followers of Duygu Özaslan consisted of three main groups: "fans", "haters" and "righteous ones". In a study conducted with 242 people in 2018, it was found that Duygu Özaslan is the most followed beauty vlogger after Danla Bilic and Çağla Şıkel. 12.4% of the participants stated that they followed Duygu Özaslan. As of July 2020, Özaslan has more than 1.45 million subscribers on YouTube.

In a study related to product placement studies on YouTube channels, the videos that Özaslan uploaded on her YouTube channel between 1 June 2017 and 20 February 2018 were analyzed and it was found that the viewers were interested in Duygu Özaslan and the shooting quality of the videos rather than advertisement.

=== Criticism ===
Özaslan received criticism by social media users in July 2020, after photographs taken of her in a bikini by the paparazzi and shown in the press turned out to be different from those she had published on her Instagram account. Özaslan explained that she had bulimia nervosa, which had affected her eating habits and weight, and added that she was in treatment.
