= MasterChef Turkey =

Turkish reality television series

- Also known as: MasterChef Türkiye
- Genre: Cookery
- Created by: Franc Roddam
- Presented by: Öykü Serter (2011)
- Judges: Murat Bozok (2011); Batuhan Piatti (2011); Erol Kaynar (2011); Mehmet Yalçınkaya (2018–); Hazer Amani (2018); Somer Sivrioğlu (2018–); Danilo Zanna (2019–)
- Country of origin: Turkey
- Original language: Turkish
- No. of seasons: 9
- No. of episodes: 13 (Season 1/2011); 33 (Season 2/2018); 79 (Season 3/2019); 134 (Season 4/2020); 158 (Season 5/2021); 179 (Season 6/2022); 203 (Season 7/2023); 204 (Season 8/2024); 174 (Season 9/2025)

Production
- Producer: Uygar Ataş
- Production location: Istanbul
- Production company: Bloom Medya

Original release
- Network: Show TV
- Release: 14 March – 10 June 2011
- Network: TV8
- Release: 1 September 2018 – present

MasterChef Turkey (MasterChef Türkiye) is a Turkish competitive cooking game show based on the original British MasterChef. Its first season was broadcast on Show TV, but since 2018 it has been screened on TV8. Chefs Murat Bozok, Batuhan Piatti and Erol Kaynar served as the first season's judges, which was presented by Öykü Serter. For the show's second season in 2018, Mehmet Yalçınkaya, Hazer Amani and Somer Sivrioğlu joined the program as the new judges. Amani was replaced by Danilo Zanna in 2019. Two different groups, Blue and Red, compete to win the main title.

== Season 1 (2011) ==
=== Contestants ===
- Anyan Değirmenci
- Burçe Gür
- Emre Oruç
- Fatih Kavanoz
- Ferhat Bora (runner-up)
- Gökçe Demiröz
- Gözde Sayılgan
- Gülçin Payzın
- Hasan Fehmi Koçman
- Hüseyin Elgün
- Melis Aran
- Mine Taşer
- Murat Kolukırık
- Mustafa İhsan Çelikşan
- Muzaffer Şenduran (Winner)
- Nergis Bilek
- Neriman Büyükengin
- Semra Kurtuluş
- Sena Abay
- Tuğsan Tezil
- Uzay Akçasaray
- Yeşim Fırat

== Season 2 (2018) ==
=== System in season 2 ===
This season is the first MasterChef season directed by Acun Ilıcalı, and unlike the first season, it is a much more modernized and detailed season.

Since it was broadcast on a completely different channel 7 years after the first season and has brand new staff and judges, this season is thought to be the first season.

Compared with its successors this season, it does not have a published its pre-qualifying process.

=== Cast ===
- Alp Mehmet Sıy
- Atakan Erbek
- Burcu Eminoğlu (third place)
- Doruk Ulufer
- Ercan Demir
- Eslem Sena Yurt
- Esra Maydoğdu
- Ezgi Gürkaş
- Hakan Kanik
- Kerem Giritlioğlu (runner-up)
- Mehmet Sur
- Meltem Pisboğa (fourth place)
- Murat Özdemir
- Özlem Yüksektepe
- Tuğçe Sökesoğlu
- Uğur Kardaş (Winner)
- Umut Yeke
- Zeynep Palikoç

== Season 3 (2019) ==
=== System in season 3 ===
As of this season, Danilo Zanna has replaced Hazer Amani in the jury cast.

This season, compared to the previous two seasons, is the first season in which the pre-selection process of this competition has been broadcast.

Contestants will first go through an audition stage where the judges will cook within a certain period of time before the eyes of the judges, and the contestant who gets approval from at least two judges will move on to the next stage. In the next stage, they will go through the triple duel stage in order to enter the main cast, the person who cooks the best food in that stage will pass to the main cast, while the others will be eliminated.

However, unlike previous seasons, it has a 'reserve cast' system in which some of the eliminated in the triple duel were recalled for the replacing main cast contestants who were eliminated.

=== Cast ===
- Açelya Kılıçay
- Alican Sabunsoy (runner-up)
- Bahri Papila
- Batuhan Bayır
- Cemre Uyanık (Winner)
- Eda Karabulut
- Güzide Mertcan (third place)
- Ekin Eylem Ulaş (fourth place)
- Faruk Batuhan Öner
- Kıvanç Ermiş
- Murat Tokmak
- Mustafa Aydın
- Müge Güney
- Onur Dursun
- Orhan Eren
- Rıfat Yurttaş
- Nalan Toprak
- Suna Aydın
- Yasin Obuz
- Yekaterina Sungur

== Season 4 (2020-21) ==
=== System in season 4 ===
This season, unlike the previous season, the third qualifying stage called the 'final round' was introduced.

At this stage, the 28 winners of the triple duel were divided into two groups and 8 people were determined for the main squad from each group.

Successful contestants who failed to enter the main cast were included in the competition as reserve cast contestants. These contestants are: Sefa, Berker, Arem, Selin, Walison and Didem.

=== Contestants ===
- Arem Yüce
- Ayyüce Kamit
- Barbaros Yoloğlu (runner-up)
- Berk İlter
- Berker Başmanav
- Celal Sarıgül
- Didem Devay
- Duygu Acarsoy
- Ebru Has
- Emir Elidemir (third place)
- Eray Aksungur (fifth place)
- Esra Tokelli
- Gülşah Suna
- Furkan Yalçın
- Özgül Coşar (fourth place)
- Sedat Tuncer
- Sefa Okyay Kılıç
- Selin Öztürk Aydın
- Serhat Doğramacı (winner)
- Tanya Kilitkayalı
- Uğur Yılmaz Deniz (disqualified/eighth place)
- Walison Fonseca

== Season 5 (2021-22) ==
=== System in season 5 ===
Along with a chosen contestant by juries whose eliminated in the triple duel stage, 5 main cast contestants and 5 reserve cast contestants are selected from each group of 15 people. Thus, the number of main cast and reserve cast contestants will be completed to 15.

The selected reserve cast contestants have to compete against each other each week to replace an eliminated contestant from the main cast.(in the first match, for to be the last contestant of the main cast)

The selection of the reserve cast is made before the qualifying day, but in terms of the rules it is the same as the final round stage. In the last two reserve selections, the second stage, the creativity stage, is removed. Instead, the person who cooks the food requested by the chefs best is included in the main cast.

In addition, the 'loop round, in which the eliminated contestants are brought back, was introduced this season. Two of the contestants eliminated before they reach the last ten in this round have a chance to be reintegrated into the main cast, thus reshaping the second turning point, the last twelve.

This season is the season where the elimination system is changed the most, and it is also the MasterChef season with the most reserve contestants called up. (13 reserve calling in total; 3 for final round, 7 for main cast, 2 for main cast in mid-to-end season )

=== Main cast ===
- Fatma Polat
- Milhan Erdem
- Dilara Başaran (fifth place)
- İbrahim Cingözler
- Tunahan Ak
- Sükrü Özsarı
- Hamza Mercimek
- Burcu Önal (sixth place)
- Görkem Demiral
- Hasan Biltekin (runner-up)
- Tahsin Küçük (third place)
- Eren Kaşıkçı (Winner)
- Mert Yılmaz
- Safanur Bol
- Emre Büber
- Sergen Özen
- Mustafa Ozan
- Azize Polat
- Mert Ateş Durukan
- Araz Aknam
- Pelin Zaman
- Rabia Nur Çamurlu

== Season 6 (2022-23) ==
=== System in season 6 ===
Slightly different from the previous season, they did not call a reserve contestants for the final round. Instead, they choose 6 contestant from each batch of 16 contestants for the main cast, then they choose 5 contestants from each batch of remaining 10 contestants for the reserve cast. Complete the number of main cast contestants to 18, reserve cast contestants to 15.

Since the number of main cast contestants for this season has been increased to 18, the number of reserve contestants to be recruited this season has been reduced to 5. That's why it is the first season in which the number of reserve contestants is reduced.

=== Main cast ===
- Metin Yavuz (Winner)
- Gamze Tosun
- Onur Biçim
- Çağatay Akgül
- Şeyma Müjdeci
- Melih Berkay Gündüz
- Büsra Zambak
- Fatma Nur Uçar
- Tayfun Genç
- Yağız Özçelik
- Burak Revanbahş
- Kaan Noyanalpan
- Burak Kaya (fifth place)
- Dilan Karataş
- Barış Demir
- Kıvanç Karadeniz (runner-up)
- Ayaz Geçer (third place)
- Serpilay Salkım
- Tolga Şener
- Vural Burnaz
- Atike Bozyaka
- Görkem Ünal (fourth place)
- Şule Yaman

== Season 7 All Star (2023-24) ==
=== System in Season 7 ===
Although the elimination system runs parallel to the 5th and 6th seasons, it differs from its predecessors by including runner-ups and champions from the reserves in the competition.

Contestants who cannot become finalists are categorized according to the seasons they are in and divided into 4 batches and competed each other to enter 5 person-quota each:

•1'st Batch: Season 2 (2018) and Season 3 (2019)

This batch is consisted of only 12. Due to their small number, they selected only 3 people for the reserve candidates, apart from those who entered the 5-person main squad quota.

•2'nd Batch: Season 4 (2020)

This batch is consisted of 14. Just like in the first batch, only 3 reserve candidates were selected from this group. It also differs from other seasons in that this season's champion is not included in the squad.

•3'rd Batch: Season 5 (2021)

This batch is consisted of 20. It differs from other seasons in that everyone in this season participates in the preliminary round.

Since they are more numerous, they increased the number of reserve candidates to 4.

•4'th Batch: Season 6 (2022)

This batch is consisted of 17. Since it is the most current season before the All Star season, they increased the number of reserve candidates to 5.

They start the competition by selecting only 2 people from the reserve candidates along with the 20 people selected for the main squad. The runner-ups of their current season are included in the squad week by week, immediately after the two selected reserve contestants.

After all runner ups arrive and the number of remaining contestants is reduced to 16, 4 champions are added to the squad at the same time, thus completing the squad.

Captains duel has been added when remaining contestant count is reduced into 16.

Unlike previous seasons, since the Survivor 2024 All Star season was postponed 1 month early, individual games were started when there were 7 contestants instead of 5.

=== Weekly System in Season 7 ===
In this season, the 3 team game-6 elimination candidate system, which was implemented in the last 3 seasons, continues as it is. However, the captain duel system and masterclass sections have been completely removed. Instead, the award game, which was played in the 6th season and counted as the 4th team game, and an individual game in which the 7th elimination candidate was determined were added.

When there were 11 contestants remaining, they reduced the number of elimination candidates to 4, and the number of elimination candidates per team game was reduced to 1. The elimination was evaluated based on the points the contestants received from both creativity and chef plates.

When there were only 7 contestants left, the competition turned completely individual. A 5-day voting game was played for the chef jacket to be given to one person each day. While the chef with the highest score won the jacket, the 2 contestants who could not get the chef jacket at the end of 5 days were eliminated.

The 5 contestants who managed to get the chef's jacket were asked to prepare an entree, a main course and a dessert of a certain concept every day, and the contestant with the lowest score at the end of the day was eliminated.

On the final day, a little different from the previous final games, they were first asked to prepare a menu with a Turkish Cuisine concept, then a menu with an International Cuisine concept, and finally, the contestants were asked to make a signature plate in the game where the champion was determined live. The contestant with the highest total score on the final day became the champion.

=== Main cast ===
- Alican Sabunsoy
- Ayaz Geçer
- Azize Polat
- Barbaros Yoloğlu (fourth place)
- Barış Demir
- Batuhan Bayır
- Berker Başmanav
- Burcu Önal
- Büşra Zambak
- Çağatay Akgül
- Cemre Uyanık
- Dilara Başaran (sixth place)
- Eda Karabulut
- Eray Aksungur
- Eren Kaşıkçı
- Esra Tokelli (Winner)
- Gamze Tosun
- Güzide Mertcan
- Hasan Biltekin (third place)
- Kerem Giritlioğlu
- Kıvanç Karadeniz
- Mert Yılmaz
- Metin Yavuz
- Rıfat Yurttaş
- Sefa Okyay Kılıç
- Sergen Özen (fifth place)
- Suna Aydın
- Tahsin Küçük (runner-up)
- Tanya Kilitkayalı
- Tolga Şener
- Uğur Kardaş

== Season 8 (2024-25) ==
=== System in Season 8 ===
This season's system is similar to that of season 7. The contestants who made it to the final round competed in 4 groups of 12 candidates and competed to be placed in the main cast quota of 5 people each.

However, unlike the previous final rounds, instead of the entire first rounds being a recipe competition, they started with one day of recipe (on odd-numbered days) and one day of creativity (on even-numbered days).

The contestants who could not make it to the main cast played a 2-round game to get into the reserve round, where 3-4 people would be taken from each group.

In the reserve round, unlike Season 7 did, they selected 5 people for the only instead of 2.

The elimination system in the main competition is the same as that of season 7.

=== Main cast ===
- Zeynep Gültepe
- Hakan Dündar
- Onur Üresin (Winner)
- Ümmühan Ünavcı
- Deniz Yılmaz
- Çağlar Azır
- Serhat Gül
- Alper Öztamur ( eight place)
- Ayşe Ekiz
- Beril Yavuz
- Semih Temiz (third place)
- Eda Çağlayan (fourth place)
- Muratcan Sunal
- Ezgi Yıldırım
- Nigar Akyıldız
- Beyza Aydın (fifth place)
- Emre Ün
- Kaan Özdemir
- Kerem Bilginer (runner-up)
- Nevzat Gürol
- Zübeyde Yaslak
- Şirin Sadegzade (seventh place)
- Akin Kiziltaş
- Yudum Kıvançkaya
- Erim Şanal (sixth place)
- Bera Altaş

=== Elimination Table ===
#	Contestant	Week																							
#	Contestant	1	2	3	4	5	6	7	8	9	10	11	12	13	14	15	16	17	18	19	20	21	22	23	
#	Contestant	11 Aug	18 Aug	25 Aug	01 Sep	08 Sep	15 Sep	22 Sep	29 Sep	06 Oct	13 Oct	20 Oct	27 Oct	03 Nov	10 Nov	17 Nov	24 Nov	01 Dec	08 Dec	15 Dec	21 Dec	26 Dec	30 Dec	10 Jan	11 Jan
1	Onur Üresin	IN	IN	BC	IN	IN	IN	IN	IN	IN	IN	NOM	IN	NOM	IN	RC	BC	IN	RC	IN	IN	IN	IN	IN	WINNER
2	Kerem Bilginer	IN	LOW	IN	IN	IN	IN	NOM	IN	IN	RC	IN	NOM	IN	IN	IN	IN	NOM	IN	BC	IN	IN	IN	IN	RUNNER-UP
3	Semih Temiz	IN	IN	IN	NOM	IN	IN	IN	NOM	RC	IN	BC	NOM	NOM	RC	BC	LOW	NOM	IN	RC	IN	IN	IN	ELIM	
4	Eda Çağlayan	IN	IN	IN	IN	NOM	IN	IN	IN	NOM	NOM	NOM	IN	IN	NOM	NOM	RC	IN	IN	NOM	IN	IN	IN	ELIM	
5	Beyza Aydın	NOM	IN	RC	NOM	IN	IN	NOM	IN	IN	IN	IN	IN	IN	DNP	IN	IN	BC	NOM	IN	IN	IN	ELIM		
6	Erim Şanal						LOW	RC	NOM	IN	IN	IN	NOM	NOM	IN	IN	NOM	IN	NOM	NOM	IN	ELIM			
7	Şirin Sadegzade			IN	IN	IN	IN	NOM	IN	LOW	IN	IN	IN	IN	BC	IN	IN	RC	LOW	NOM	ELIM				
8	Alper Öztamur	IN	IN	NOM	IN	NOM	IN	BC	IN	NOM	NOM	NOM	LOW	NOM	IN	LOW	IN	IN	IN	ELIM					
9	Emre Ün	BC	NOM	IN	IN	IN	IN	IN	IN	IN	NOM	NOM	IN	IN	IN	IN	IN	IN	ELIM						
10	Kaan Özdemir	IN	NOM	IN	IN	BC	NOM	IN	LOW	IN	IN	IN	IN	RC	LOW	IN	IN	ELIM							
11	Muratcan Sural	NOM	IN	IN	IN	LOW	IN	NOM	IN	NOM	IN	RC	BC	IN	IN	NOM	ELIM								
12	Ezgi Yıldırım	IN	NOM	NOM	IN	RC	IN	IN	IN	IN	IN	IN	NOM	BC	IN	ELIM									
13	Nigar Akyıldız	NOM	IN	IN	NOM	NOM	IN	IN	NOM	IN	NOM	NOM	RC	LOW	ELIM										
14	Akın Kızıltaş				LOW	NOM	RC	IN	BC	IN	NOM	LOW	IN	ELIM											
15	Hakan Dündar	IN	IN	IN	BC	IN	NOM	IN	NOM	IN	IN	IN	ELIM												
16	Nevzat Güray Gürol	IN	BC	NOM	NOM	IN	NOM	IN	IN	NOM	BC	ELIM													
17	Zübeyde Yaşlak		IN	LOW	NOM	IN	BC	NOM	RC	BC	ELIM														
18	Ayşe Ekiz	RC	IN	NOM	IN	IN	NOM	IN	IN	ELIM															
19	Bera Altaş							IN	ELIM																
20	Yudum Kıvançkaya					IN	IN	ELIM																	
21	Beril Yavuz	IN	IN	IN	RC	NOM	ELIM																		
22	Sena Zeynep Gültepe	IN	RC	IN	IN	ELIM																			
23	Çağlar Azir	NOM	IN	NOM	ELIM																				
24	Ümmühan Ünavcı	IN	NOM	ELIM																					
25	Deniz Erkal	LOW	ELIM																						
26	Serhat Gül	ELIM																							

(ELIM) The contestant was eliminated.
BLUE BORDERED (ELIM) The contestant was the Blue team captain and eliminated.
RED BORDERED (ELIM) The contestant was the Red team captain and eliminated.
(LOW) The contestant was the second worst in the elimination game.
(NOM) Nominated for elimination
(BC) Blue Team Captain.
(RC) Red Team Captain.
YELLOW BORDERED (RC), Red team captain & nominated to be eliminated.
ORANGE BORDERED (RC), Red team captain & the second worst in the elimination game.
YELLOW BORDERED (BC), Blue team captain & nominated to be eliminated.
ORANGE BORDERED (BC), Blue team captain & the second worst in the elimination game.
(IN) Not nominated for elimination
(TBD) To be determined.
(DNP) Did not play.
Contestant haven't gotten in.
Contestant is eliminated.

== Season 9 (2025) ==
=== System in Season 9 ===
First half of this season is progressing exact same as Season 8.

This season has the second largest cast with 28 contestants (20 main, 8 reserves).

Due to low ratings, elimination system is sped up into 2 elimination per week in latter half of this season.

Final week begins with a game in which half of the remaining 8 contestants will wear the chef jacket and the remaining half will be eliminated collectively as quarter-finalists.

Then the same system continues with a game where half of the 4 contestants wearing chef jackets become finalists and the other half are eliminated as semi-finalists.

=== Main cast ===
- Furkan Kahraman
- Eylül Azra Soysal
- Çağatay Doğanoğlu (third place)
- Onur Dikbaş
- Hilal Ağca
- Sercan Şahinoğlu
- Ayla Canpunar
- İhsan Yiğit Uçak
- Ayten Saner
- Çağlar Öz
- Sezer Dirican (Winner)
- Cansu Irmak Aydar
- Özkan Akan (runner-up)
- Gizem Tokat Budakçı (Quarter finalist)
- İrem Tuğrul
- Hakan Altunbaş (fourth place)
- Tunahan Onhan
- Sümeyye Şahin (Quarter finalist)
- Merve Gezgin
- İlhan Buğra Karabulut
- Mert Çamlıbel (Quarter finalist)
- Bilal Salman
- Barış Kaya (Quarter finalist)
- Nisa Nur Demirel
- Muratcan Akpınar
- Meryem Sevinç
- Aslı Öner
- Deniz Demiröz

=== Elimination Table ===
#	Contestant	Week																						
#	Contestant	1	2	3	4	5	6	7	8	9	10	11	12	13	14	15		16		17		18	19	
#	Contestant	10 Aug	17 Aug	24 Aug	31 Aug	06 Sep	14 Sep	21 Sep	27 Sep	04 Oct	10 Oct	18 Oct	25 Oct	01 Nov	08 Nov	12 Nov	15 Nov	19 Nov	22 Nov	26 Nov	29 Nov	03 Dec	05 Dec	06 Dec
1	Sezer Dirican	IN	IN	NOM	IN	IN	NOM	NOM	IN	BC	NOM	NOM	IN	IN	NOM	IN	IN	BC		IN	NOM	IN	IN	WINNER
2	Özkan Akan	NOM	IN	IN	IN	NOM	IN	IN	IN	IN	IN	IN	IN	IN	IN	IN	IN	NOM	IN	RC		IN	IN	RUNNER-UP
3	Çağatay Doğanoğlu	IN	NOM	IN	IN	NOM	IN	IN	BC	NOM	IN	IN	IN	NOM	IN	IN	IN	IN	LOW	NOM	LOW	IN	ELIM	
4	Hakan Altunbaş	IN	IN	IN	IN	IN	BC	IN	NOM	IN	IN	IN	NOM	IN	IN	NOM	IN	NOM	NOM	IN	IN	IN	ELIM	
5	Gizem Tokat Budakçı	BC	IN	NOM	IN	IN	IN	IN	IN	IN	IN	IN	IN	NOM	IN	IN	IN	IN	IN	IN	IN	ELIM		
6	Barış Kaya				IN	IN	IN	NOM	LOW	RC	NOM	LOW	NOM	NOM	IN	IN	NOM	IN	NOM	IN	IN	ELIM		
7	Mert Çamlıbel		IN	NOM	NOM	NOM	IN	IN	IN	NOM	IN	IN	IN	RC	IN	IN	IN	IN	IN	LOW	NOM	ELIM		
8	Sümeyye Şahin	IN	IN	IN	NOM	IN	IN	IN	IN	IN	NOM	IN	NOM	NOM	NOM	RC	RC	IN	IN	IN	IN	ELIM		
9	Ayla Canpunar	IN	IN	IN	IN	BC	NOM	IN	RC	IN	IN	IN	IN	IN	IN	NOM	IN	RC		NOM	ELIM			
10	Muratcan Akpınar					IN	IN	NOM	NOM	NOM	IN	RC	IN	IN	LOW	IN	LOW	LOW	IN	ELIM				
11	Furkan Kahraman	IN	IN	IN	IN	IN	IN	NOM	IN	NOM	IN	BC	IN	IN	BC	IN	IN	IN	ELIM					
12	Eylül Azra Soysal	IN	IN	BC	BC	IN	IN	IN	NOM	IN	IN	IN	NOM	IN	RC	LOW	IN	ELIM						
13	Ayten Saner	IN	NOM	RC	IN	NOM	IN	IN	IN	IN	RC	IN	BC	LOW	IN	BC	ELIM							
14	Onur Dikbaş	IN	IN	IN	IN	IN	NOM	RC	IN	LOW	IN	NOM	IN	BC	NOM	ELIM								
15	Çağlar Öz	NOM	LOW	IN	RC	RC	NOM	NOM	IN	IN	NOM	IN	NOM	NOM	ELIM									
16	Aslı Öner							IN	NOM	IN	NOM	IN	LOW	ELIM										
17	Nisa Nur Demirel				IN	NOM	NOM	LOW	IN	IN	IN	NOM	ELIM											
18	Cansu Irmak Aydar	NOM	NOM	LOW	NOM	IN	IN	IN	IN	IN	BC	ELIM												
19	İhsan Yiğit Uçak	NOM	NOM	NOM	IN	IN	IN	BC	IN	IN	ELIM													
20	Deniz Demiröz								IN	ELIM														
21	Meryem Sevinç						IN	IN	ELIM															
22	İrem Tuğrul	LOW	IN	IN	NOM	IN	RC	ELIM																
23	İlhan Buğra Karabulut	RC	NOM	IN	IN	IN	ELIM																	
24	Sercan Şahinoğlu	IN	RC	IN	IN	ELIM																		
25	Hilal Ağca	IN	IN	NOM	ELIM																			
26	Bilal Salman			ELIM																				
27	Merve Gezgin	NOM	ELIM																					
28	Tunahan Onhan	ELIM																						

(ELIM) The contestant was eliminated.
BLUE BORDERED (ELIM) The contestant was the Blue team captain and eliminated.
RED BORDERED (ELIM) The contestant was the Red team captain and eliminated.
(LOW) The contestant was the second worst in the elimination game.
(NOM) Nominated for elimination
(BC) Blue Team Captain.
(RC) Red Team Captain.
YELLOW BORDERED (RC), Red team captain & nominated to be eliminated.
ORANGE BORDERED (RC), Red team captain & the second worst in the elimination game.
YELLOW BORDERED (BC), Blue team captain & nominated to be eliminated.
ORANGE BORDERED (BC), Blue team captain & the second worst in the elimination game.
(IN) Not nominated for elimination
(TBD) To be determined.
Contestant haven't gotten in.
Contestant is eliminated.

== Season 10 All Star Gold Cup (2025-26) ==
=== System in Season 10 ===
This season is serving as mini filler season in between MasterChef Turkey Season 9 and Survivor Turkey Season 20.

In the first two weeks, five team challenges are played, and at the end of the day, the person from the losing team who wins immunity directly nominates a candidate for elimination. This also applies to the elimination candidate, but their nomination is not dropped.

The elimination round consists of two stages. In each round, there will be one contestant eliminated.

In the third week, two-stage challenge are played each day to determine the quarter-finalists who will receive the golden apron. The winner of the day becomes a quarter-finalist, and those who do not make it into the 8-person quarter-final quota by the end of the week are eliminated.

In the first half of the final week, the quarter-finalists play a two-round game to win one of four chef jackets. The winner of the day becomes a semi-finalist, while those who don't win a jacket by the end of the four days are all eliminated.

=== Main Cast ===
- Alican Sabunsoy
- Ayaz Geçer
- Barbaros Yoloğlu
- Barış Demir
- Batuhan Bayır
- Beyza Aydın
- Çağatay Doğanoğlu (third place)
- Dilara Başaran
- Eda Çağlayan
- Eren Kaşıkçı
- Erim Şanal
- Hasan Biltekin (runner-up)
- Hakan Altunbaş
- Kerem Bilginer
- Kıvanç Karadeniz (fourth place)
- Özkan Akan
- Semih Temiz
- Sergen Özen (Winner)
- Sezer Dirican
- Tolga Şener

== Season 11 (2026) ==
=== System in Season 11 ===
The season is progressing almsot the same as Season 8 & 9.

This season has 26 contestants (20 main, 6 reserves).

In this season, unlike others, 2 of the final reserves has been determined by polls. The 5th reserve Faruk Garip was selected via an impromptu voting during the mystery box challenge episode to determine the that week's blue team captain whereas the 6th and final reserve Buse Baştan was determined via an Instagram poll including all the remaining reserve cast.

The individual game to determine the last elimination candidate called the strainer game was renounced. Instead, the Red and Blue teams go for a 4th team game meaning it's possible to make the score even thus sending 2 additional eliminiation candidates to the elimination game, making it an 8-player game in the elimination nights.

=== Elimination Table ===
#	Contestant	Week														
#	Contestant	1	2	3	4	5	6	7	8	9	10	11	12	13	14	15
#	Contestant	16 Aug	23 Aug	30 Aug	06 Sep	13 Sep	20 Sep	27 Sep	04 Oct	11 Oct	18 Oct	25 Oct	01 Nov	08 Nov	15 Nov	22 Nov
IN	Elif Nilay Özgen	NOM	IN	NOM	IN	NOM	IN	NOM	IN	RC	IN	NOM	IN	IN	IN	IN
IN	Enes Vardar	LOW	NOM	IN	IN	IN	IN	LOW	IN	NOM	NOM	RC	NOM	IN	NOM	IN
IN	Eyyüp Can Güneş	IN	IN	IN	BC	IN	IN	NOM	BC	IN	IN	NOM	IN	NOM	IN	IN
IN	Şadi Altınay	IN	RC	NOM	NOM	RC	NOM	IN	IN	NOM	IN	BC	IN	NOM	IN	NOM
IN	Burçin Oğuz	BC	IN	RC	IN	IN	IN	IN	IN	IN	NOM	NOM	IN	IN	NOM	IN
IN	Tolğa Çakuş	NOM	IN	IN	IN	BC	NOM	IN	IN	BC	NOM	IN	IN	NOM	BC	IN
IN	Muhammed Haliloğlu	IN	BC	IN	NOM	IN	IN	NOM	IN	IN	BC	IN	NOM	NOM	IN	IN
IN	Ayşe Nur İnal	RC	NOM	NOM	IN	IN	NOM	NOM	NOM	NOM	IN	LOW	IN	NOM	IN	BC
IN	Bahar Kaya	IN	IN	IN	IN	IN	RC	IN	IN	IN	IN	IN	IN	NOM	LOW	IN
IN	Armağan Kırant	IN	NOM	IN	IN	NOM	BC	NOM	IN	IN	IN	IN	LOW	BC	IN	NOM
IN	Tolgahan Özden					NOM	NOM	IN	NOM	IN	NOM	NOM	IN	LOW	RC	LOW
12	Şükran Boyraz	IN	NOM	NOM	NOM	IN	IN	BC	NOM	IN	NOM	IN	NOM	RC	IN	ELIM
13	Nurten Tamer	IN	IN	IN	NOM	IN	NOM	IN	RC	NOM	LOW	IN	NOM	IN	ELIM	
14	Kübra Satılmış	NOM	IN	LOW	IN	IN	LOW	IN	NOM	LOW	RC	IN	BC	ELIM		
15	Hasan Alp Karabacak	IN	IN	NOM	IN	IN	IN	NOM	IN	NOM	NOM	NOM	ELIM			
16	Emre İrkilmez			BC	LOW	LOW	IN	IN	IN	IN	IN	ELIM				
17	Şiringül Kaya	IN	IN	IN	NOM	IN	NOM	RC	NOM	IN	ELIM					
18	Buse Baştan							IN	LOW	ELIM						
19	Batuhan Nazikoğlu	NOM	IN	IN	IN	NOM	IN	IN	ELIM							
20	Recep Batur		NOM	NOM	IN	NOM	IN	ELIM								
21	Faruk Garip						ELIM									
22	Cansu Şöhret				RC	ELIM										
23	Koray Saygı	IN	LOW	IN	ELIM											
24	Simge Çıtak	NOM	NOM	ELIM												
25	Gülbahar Meşe	IN	ELIM													
26	Demirhan Ali Tekin	ELIM														

(ELIM) The contestant was eliminated.
BLUE BORDERED (ELIM) The contestant was the Blue team captain and eliminated.
RED BORDERED (ELIM) The contestant was the Red team captain and eliminated.
(LOW) The contestant was the second worst in the elimination game.
(NOM) Nominated for elimination
(BC) Blue Team Captain.
(RC) Red Team Captain.
YELLOW BORDERED (RC), Red team captain & nominated to be eliminated.
ORANGE BORDERED (RC), Red team captain & the second worst in the elimination game.
YELLOW BORDERED (BC), Blue team captain & nominated to be eliminated.
ORANGE BORDERED (BC), Blue team captain & the second worst in the elimination game.
(IN) Not nominated for elimination
(TBD) To be determined.
Contestant haven't gotten in.
Contestant is eliminated.

=== Weekly teams ===
At the beginning of each week, a mystery box challenge is played where all contestants compete individually. The contestant who wins the challenge is chosen as the captain of the blue team and selects the captain of the red team. In weeks with an even number of contestants, the blue team captain determines the final contestant of the red team with their last pick, whereas in weeks with an odd number of contestants, the red team captain determines the final contestant of the blue team with their last pick.

==== Blue ====
Since the captain of the blue team earns this right through a challenge, they are granted 2 separate individual immunities by the show, which can be used in the event of losing any team challenge.

Week	Captain	Picks									Result
Week 1	Burçin	Batuhan	Bahar	Kübra	Tolğa	Eyyüp Can	Hasan Alp	Nilay	Demirhan	Şiringül	3-1
Week 2	Muhammed	Armağan	Gül	Ayşe	Enes	Hasan Alp	Koray	Şükran	Recep	Simge	4-0
Week 3	Emre	Şadi	Nilay	Tolğa	Kübra	Şükran	Hasan Alp	Recep	Simge	Ayşe	4-0
Week 4	Eyyüp Can	Bahar	Nurten	Nilay	Tolğa	Hasan Alp	Enes	Burçin	Kübra	Şiringül	3-1
Week 5	Tolğa	Bahar	Şükran	Cansu	Şiringül	Nilay	Kübra	Burçin	Nurten	Ayşe	3-1
Week 6	Armağan	Muhammed	Nurten	Enes	Batuhan	Ayşe	Tolgahan	Şiringül	Recep	Emre	2-2
Week 7	Şükran	Bahar	Muhammed	Tolğa	Nilay	Emre	Eyyüp Can	Ayşe	Tolgahan	Buse	2-2
Week 8	Eyyüp Can	Bahar	Armağan	Tolğa	Burçin	Enes	Hasan Alp	Şiringül	Buse	Şadi	3-1
Week 9	Tolğa	Bahar	Armağan	Şükran	Emre	Eyyüp Can	Burçin	Tolgahan	Şiringül		4-0
Week 10	Muhammed	Armağan	Şükran	Nilay	Eyyüp Can	Enes	Şiringül	Hasan Alp	Şadi		2-2
Week 11	Şadi	Bahar	Muhammed	Tolğa	Eyyüp Can	Şükran	Kübra	Ayşe			3-1
Week 12	Kübra	Bahar	Tolğa	Burçin	Eyyüp Can	Nilay	Şadi	Ayşe			4-0
Week 13	Armağan	Muhammed	Tolğa	Kübra	Şadi	Tolgahan	Ayşe				3-1
Week 14	Tolğa	Eyyüp Can	Armağan	Burçin	Enes	Şadi	Ayşe				2-2
Week 15	Ayşe	Tolğa	Bahar	Tolgahan (Note: The Blue Team captain, having won the season's first captaincy duel, used the advantage to send Burçin, whom she had previously selected for her team, to the Red Team and replace her with Tolgahan.)	Enes	Eyyüp Can					3-1
Week 16	TBD	TBD	TBD	TBD	TBD	TBD					TBD

Loss. Win. Tie.

==== Red ====
The captain of the red team is chosen by the winner of the blue team captaincy. In weeks following the depletion of reserve contestants, when the total number of contestants is odd, the red team competes with one fewer contestant. Unlike the blue team captain, the red team captain does not possess any immunity rights.

Week	Captain	Picks									Result
Week 1	Ayşe	Armağan	Muhammed	Enes	Simge	Şükran	Gül	Koray	Nurten	Şadi	3-1
Week 2	Şadi	Nurten	Bahar	Tolğa	Batuhan	Kübra	Nilay	Burçin	Şiringül	Eyyüp Can	4-0
Week 3	Burçin	Bahar	Armağan	Muhammed	Nurten	Eyyüp Can	Şiringül	Enes	Batuhan	Koray	4-0
Week 4	Cansu	Emre	Armağan	Muhammed	Batuhan	Koray	Şükran	Ayşe	Recep	Şadi	3-1
Week 5	Şadi	Eyyüp Can	Tolgahan	Emre	Enes	Muhammed	Hasan Alp	Recep	Armağan	Batuhan	3-1
Week 6	Bahar	Nilay	Şükran	Tolğa	Hasan Alp	Eyyüp Can	Burçin	Faruk	Kübra	Şadi	2-2
Week 7	Şiringül	Armağan	Nurten	Hasan Alp	Batuhan	Enes	Burçin	Recep	Kübra	Şadi	2-2
Week 8	Nurten	Şükran	Muhammed	Batuhan	Emre	Nilay	Tolgahan	Ayşe	Kübra		3-1
Week 9	Nilay	Muhammed	Nurten	Enes	Ayşe	Hasan Alp	Şadi	Kübra	Buse		4-0
Week 10	Kübra	Bahar	Nurten	Tolğa	Burçin	Emre	Tolgahan	Ayşe			2-2
Week 11	Enes	Armağan	Nurten	Burçin	Nilay	Emre	Tolgahan	Hasan Alp			3-1
Week 12	Hasan Alp	Muhammed	Şükran	Nurten	Armağan	Enes	Tolgahan				4-0
Week 13	Şürkan	Bahar	Burçin	Nurten	Eyyüp Can	Nilay	Enes				3-1
Week 14	Tolgahan	Muhammed	Bahar	Şükran	Nurten	Nilay					2-2
Week 15	Şükran	Muhammed	Armağan	Nilay	Burçin	Nilay					3-1
Week 16	TBD	TBD	TBD	TBD	TBD						TBD

Loss. Win. Tie.

=== Individual immunities and Elimination nominees ===
Each week, 4 team challenges are played. The losing team in each team challenge plays an individual game among themselves called the individual immunity game. The winner becomes immune specifically for that day and nominates a contestant from their team as an elimination nominee. Blue team captains hold immunity rights for 2 out of the 4 games. Therefore, unless the blue team loses 3 out of the 4 team games, the blue team captain cannot be selected as an elimination nominee.

	1st Team Challenge	2nd Team Challenge	3rd Team Challenge	4th Team Challenge
Week 1 Immunities	Nilay	Kübra	Eyyüp Can	Muhammed
Week 1 Immunities	Burçin			
Week 1 Nominees	Batuhan	Nilay	Kübra	Simge
Week 1 Nominees	Demirhan	Burçin	Tolğa	Enes
Week 2 Immunities	Armağan	Hasan Alp	Şükran	Muhammed
Week 2 Immunities	Muhammed	Muhammed		
Week 2 Nominees	Ayşe	Gül	Recep	Şükran
Week 2 Nominees	Koray	Simge	Enes	Armağan
Week 3 Immunities	Simge	Hasan Alp	Şükran	Emre
Week 3 Immunities	Emre	Emre		
Week 3 Nominees	Şadi	Simge	Recep	Hasan Alp
Week 3 Nominees	Nilay	Ayşe	Kübra	Şükran
Week 4 Immunities	Şükran	Armağan	Ayşe	Hasan Alp
Week 4 Immunities				Eyyüp Can
Week 4 Nominees	Muhammed	Şükran	Şadi	Şiringül
Week 4 Nominees	Koray	Emre	Cansu	Nurten
Week 5 Immunities	Bahar	Muhammed	Batuhan	Hasan Alp
Week 5 Immunities	Tolğa			
Week 5 Nominees	Cansu	Tolgahan	Recep	Batuhan
Week 5 Nominees	Nilay	Emre	Şadi	Armağan
Week 6 Immunities	Emre	Kübra	Burçin	Enes
Week 6 Immunities	Armağan			Armağan
Week 6 Nominees	Şiringül	Faruk	Tolğa	Nurten
Week 6 Nominees	Tolgahan	Şadi	Kübra	Ayşe
Week 7 Immunities	Burçin	Bahar	Şiringül	Şükran
Week 7 Immunities		Şükran		Şükran
Week 7 Nominees	Recep	Eyyüp Can	Enes	Muhammed
Week 7 Nominees	Armağan	Nilay	Hasan Alp	Ayşe
Week 8 Immunities	Emre	Bahar	Tolgahan	Nilay
Week 8 Immunities		Eyyüp Can		
Week 8 Nominees	Kübra	Şiringül	Batuhan	Şükran
Week 8 Nominees	Ayşe	Buse	Nurten	Tolgahan
Week 9 Immunities	Şadi	Muhammed	Kübra	Muhammed
Week 9 Nominees	Nurten	Nilay	Hasan Alp	Enes
Week 9 Nominees	Ayşe	Buse	Şadi	Kübra
Week 10 Immunities	Şadi	Tolğa	Ayşe	Muhammed
Week 10 Immunities	Muhammed			Muhammed
Week 10 Nominees	Şiringül	Burçin	Tolğa	Şükran
Week 10 Nominees	Hasan Alp	Nurten	Tolgahan	Enes
Week 11 Immunities	Burçin	Bahar	Enes	Nilay
Week 11 Immunities		Şadi		
Week 11 Nominees	Enes	Ayşe	Nilay	Tolgahan
Week 11 Nominees	Emre	Eyyüp Can	Burçin	Hasan Alp
Week 12 Immunities	Muhammed	Tolgahan	Tolgahan	Tolgahan
Week 12 Nominees	Nurten	Şükran	Armağan	N/A
Week 12 Nominees	Enes	Hasan Alp	Muhammed	N/A
Week 13 Immunities	Kübra	Nurten	Tolgahan	Armağan
Week 13 Immunities	Armağan		Armağan	
Week 13 Nominees	Tolgahan	Bahar	Kübra	Muhammed
Week 13 Nominees	Ayşe	Eyyüp Can	Şadi	Tolğa
Elimination nights are now down to 4 contestants.
Week 14 Immunities	Nilay	Armağan	Tolgahan	Ayşe
Week 14 Immunities		Tolğa		Tolğa
Week 14 Nominees	Nurten	Burçin	Bahar	Enes
Week 15 Immunities	Nilay	Enes	Armağan	Nilay
Week 15 Immunities		Ayşe		
Week 15 Nominees	Şükran	Tolgahan	Şadi	Armağan
Week 16 Immunities				
Week 16 Nominees				

The contestant was eliminated from MasterChef during the elimination night that week.

The contestant won the individual immunity challenge that day.

The contestant used the immunity right granted by the blue team captaincy that day.

== Series overview ==
Season	Contestants	Episodes	Originally released		Time Slot (TT)	TV channel
Season	Contestants	Episodes	First released	Last released	Time Slot (TT)	TV channel
1	13	22	March 14, 2011	June 10, 2011	Every week at 20:00	Show TV
2	18	33	June 1, 2018	December 23, 2018	Every week at 20:00	TV8
3	20	79	August 18, 2019	December 30, 2019	3 days a week at 20:00	TV8
4	22	134	July 17, 2020	January 3, 2021	5 days a week at 20:00	TV8
5	22	158	June 26, 2021	January 14, 2022	5 days a week at 20:00	TV8
6	23	179	July 1, 2022	January 10, 2023	Every day at 20:00	TV8
7	31	203	June 14, 2023	January 7, 2024	Every day at 20:00	TV8
8	26	204	June 14, 2024	January 11, 2025	Every day at 20:00	TV8
9	28	174	June 14, 2025	December 6, 2025	Every day at 20:00	TV8
10	20	30	December 7, 2025	January 18, 2026	Every day at 20:00	TV8
11	26	126	June 13, 2026	TBA	Every day at 20:00	TV8
