= Danilo Zanna =

Italian chef living in Turkey (born 1982)

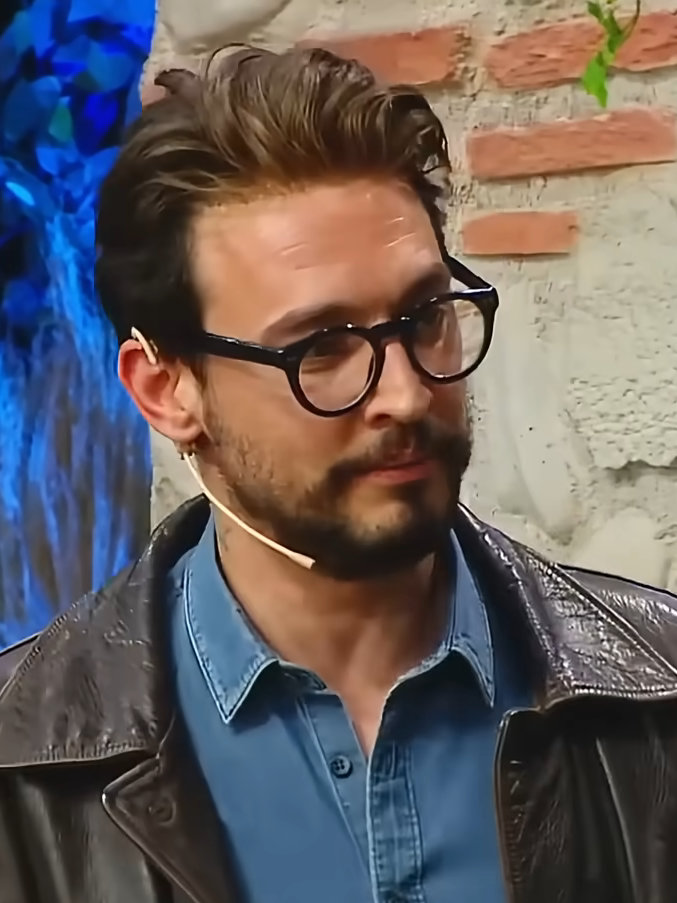
- Born: 15 April 1982 (age 44); Prato, Tuscany, Italy
- Occupations: Chef and television presenter
- Years active: 1997–present
- Spouse: Tuğçe Demirbilek (m. 2012; div. 2021)
- Children: 1

Danilo Zanna (born 15 April 1982) is an Italian chef, television presenter, and restaurant operator residing in Turkey. He has been a judge in the reality show MasterChef Turkey since 2019.

== Life and career ==
=== Early years ===
Zanna was born on 15 April 1982 in Prato, Tuscany, Italy to Italian parents Armando Zanna and Emillia Zanna. He took over cooking as a family business. He strengthened his culinary skills by working with Italian chefs on Italian cuisine.

=== Life in Turkey ===
Zanna, who is interested in Turkish cuisine, migrated from Italy to Turkey because he wanted to pursue a career in this field. After settling in Turkey, he opened a restaurant with Italian and Turkish cuisine. Later, he started to take part in television programs, with his first being in a program called "Zahide ile Hayata Yetiş" as an assistant chef.

Zanna rose to recognition with the cooking show İtalyan İşi, which he had created and presented on the Planet Mutfak television channel. He worked on Italian dishes at Kadir Has University Istanbul Cuisine Institute, which includes the restaurant culture of different countries in Turkey.

After Planet Mutfak was shut down, he appeared on television with the programs Elin Oğlu, broadcast on ATV, and Lezzetin Şarkısı, which was broadcast on NTV, and presented by himself. Zanna is currently a jury member in the program of MasterChef Turkey, which started to be broadcast on TV8 in its new season in 2019. He married Tuğçe Demirbilek in 2012, and divorced her on 15 December 2021.

On 10 January 2022, he opened a branch of the Italian restaurant Filo D'Olio, in Izmir, Turkey, and recruited Mert Ateş Durukan, who competed in MasterChef Turkey Season 5, to his cooking team, and Safanur Bol from the same season, a short while later. After a while, he recruited Kaan Noyanalpan who competed in MasterChef Turkey Season 6.

He has also hosted the Turkish version of MasterChef Junior, which has aired on Exxen since 2021. As of 2024, he remains one of the three judges in MasterChef Turkey.
