= İşte Benim Stilim =

- Genre: Reality television
- Directed by: Mustafa Said Çelik
- Presented by: Öykü Serter
- Judges: Ivana Sert (1–); Kemal Doğulu (1–4, 7); Nur Yerlitaş (1–4, 6–7); Uğurkan Erez (1–7); Hakan Akkaya (5–6); Neslihan Yargıcı (5); Kerimcan Durmaz (7); Güzide Duran (8–); Nur Bilen Yavuzer (8–)
- Composer: Ramiz Bayraktar
- Country of origin: Turkey
- Original language: Turkish
- No. of seasons: 8

Production
- Executive producer: Handan Karaman
- Producers: Caner Erdem; Haluk Şirin
- Production location: Istanbul
- Editor: Sinan Ülkü
- Production company: Production House

Original release
- Network: TV8
- Release: 15 September 2014

İşte Benim Stilim (previously aired as Bu Tarz Benim) is a reality competition show in Turkey.

The show is hosted by Öykü Serter. The jury members on this show are Nur Yerlitaş, Ivana Sert, Kemal Doğulu, Uğurkan Erez, and Kerimcan Durmaz. The influential fashion designer Nur Yerlitaş later decided to withdraw from the seventh season of the show due to her illness.

Season	Winner	Runner-up
1	Aycan & Nurcan Şencan	Ezgi Baylar
2	Emel Özkızıltaş	Zeynep Öztürk
3	Ezgi Ünal	Şilan Makal
4 (All Stars)	Ayşenur Balcı	Nihal Candan
5 (Celebrities)	Gizem Özdilli	Pelin Suade
6	Yeşim Aydın	Bahar Candan
7	Simay Tokatlı	Merve Sevin
8		

== Show format ==
Female contestants, compete each week in front of a judge to get points on their style. The contestants have to come up with a different outfit, each day from Monday to Friday to get the fashion star. On the final day of the week, called "Gala Gecesi", they have to dress, according to a fixed theme to win a prize and style points. By the end of the day, a total of points is presented, and the contestant with the lowest score gets eliminated.

Other similar versions of the show format are produced in other countries as well, such as the show My Style Rocks in Greece on ΣΚΑΪ and "Bravo, ai Stil!" (Romanian: Great, you've got the style!) through the TV formats Turkish production company Global Agency, on the Turkish-owned Television channel Kanal D Romania, where the prizes for the "Final Gala" are among 100,000 lei (equivalent of €22,000) and a television career for the 1st-place winner, and a brand new car for the second-place winner. In this show also in the weekly eliminatory galas, each contestant who ranks low among the juries and or being nominated by their rival contestants for elimination, one of the two contestants who rank the lowest among public votes will have to exit the contest. This version of the show, includes Televoting (around €1.25 SMS VAT tax included) to vote for their favourite, another jury who can choose to give or to take one's contestant achieved star at the end of the show during Monday through Friday, and at the eliminatory or non-eliminatory galas every Saturday, a group of three well-known male celebrities will appreciate with a "like" or "dislike" their appearance on the stage and also give a bonus of three points for their decided favourite appearance. This show is very popular among Romanians in and out of the country and is the most-viewed Romanian TV programme on YouTube.

== Season 1 ==
=== Contestants ===
Contestants	Age	Origin	Elimination
Aycan & Nurcan Şencan	27	(Sweden)	Winner (Episode 84)
Ezgi Baylar	31	(Turkey)	1st runner-up (Episode 84)
Ayşenur Balcı	19	(Turkey)	Eliminated in Episode 36; Reentered in Episode 55; 2nd runner-up (Episode 84)
Özlem Özden	33	(Turkey)	Eliminated in Episode 78
Gizem Güler	24	(Turkey)	Eliminated in Episode 72
Ayşegül Doğan	22	(Turkey)	Eliminated in Episode 66
Tuğçe Ergişi	25	(Turkey)	Eliminated in Episode 60
Nur Bozar	24	(Turkey)	Eliminated in Episode 54
Meltem Keklik	19	(Turkey)	Entered in Episode 37; Eliminated in Episode 48
Roza Şake Hovhannisyan	29	(Armenia)	Entered in Episode 37; Eliminated in Episode 42
Melek Balkan	24	(Bosnia and Herzegovina)	Eliminated in Episode 30
Sara Koçoğlu	20	(Turkey)	Eliminated in Episode 24
Buse Doğanay	20	(Turkey)	Eliminated in Episode 18
Gizem Kayaalp	20	(Turkey)	Eliminated in Episode 12
Esra Özüver	37	(Turkey)	Eliminated in Episode 6

== Season 2 ==
=== Contestants ===
Contestants	Age	Origin	Elimination
Emel Özkızıltaş	28	(Azerbaijan)	Winner (Episode 72)
Zeynep Öztürk	31	(Turkey)	1st runner-up (Episode 72)
Nazlı Hamarat	27	(Turkey)	2nd runner-up (Episode 72)
Çiğdem Çelik	36	(Turkey)	Entered in Episode 43; 3rd runner-up (Episode 72)
İlbige Uzun	18	(Netherlands)	Eliminated in 2nd Pre-Show; Reentered in Episode 43; Eliminated in Episode 72
Gülay Hançer	32	(Austria)	Eliminated in Episode 36; Reentered in Episode 49; Eliminated in Episode 66
Nihal Candan (deceased 2025)	20	(Turkey)	Eliminated in Episode 66
Özden Cerrahoğlu	23	(Turkey)	Eliminated in Episode 60
Maria Surina	26	(Turkmenistan)	Eliminated in Episode 54
Nazlı Sultan Kayaaslan	25	(Egypt)	Eliminated in Episode 48
Melisa Şahin	25	(Turkey)	Eliminated in Episode 42
Almila Kuruoğlu	19	(Turkey)	Eliminated in Episode 30
Gökçe Markal	19	(Turkey)	Eliminated in Episode 24
Gülşah Yanaş	21	(Turkey)	Eliminated in Episode 18
Melisa Çeliker	20	(Turkey)	Eliminated in Episode 12
Derya Yarar	23	(Turkey)	Eliminated in Episode 6
Arife Deniz	23	(Turkey)	Eliminated in 3rd Pre-Show
Aygül Bayşu	27	(Turkey)	Eliminated in 1st Pre-Show

== Season 3 ==
=== Contestants ===
Contestants	Age	Origin	Elimination
Ezgi Ünal	26	(Turkey)	Winner (Episode 60)
Şilan Makal	21	(Turkey)	1st runner-up (Episode 60)
Çağla Çetinöz	22	(Turkey)	Entered in Episode 31; 2nd runner-up (Episode 60)
Gülşah Yılmaz	32	(Turkey)	3rd runner-up (Episode 60)
Zeynep Karaca	25	(Turkey)	Entered in Episode 31; 4th runner-up (Episode 60)
Sinem Umaş	31	(Turkey)	Eliminated in Episode 54
Mihriban Akgül	22	(Uzbekistan)	Eliminated in Episode 48
Sima Şerafettinova	17	(Azerbaijan)	Disqualified in Episode 47
Didem Akın	19	(Turkey)	Eliminated in Episode 42
Cerem Güngüz	25	(Turkey)	Eliminated in Episode 36
Tümay Tali	33	(Germany)	Eliminated in Episode 30
Elçin Kayadibi	30	(Turkey)	Eliminated in Episode 24
Büşra Siral	29	(Turkey)	Eliminated in Episode 18
Neda Poursaeid	27	(Iran)	Eliminated in Episode 12
Duygu Barazi	33	(Turkey)	Eliminated in Episode 6

== Season 4 (All Stars) ==
=== Contestants ===
Contestants	Age	Origin	Elimination
Ayşenur Balcı (Season 1)	19	(Turkey)	Winner (Episode 102)
Nihal Candan (Season 2)	20	(Turkey)	1st runner-up (Episode 102)
Çiğdem Çelik (Season 2)	36	(Turkey)	2nd runner-up (Episode 102)
Özden Cerrahoğlu (Season 2)	23	(Turkey)	3rd runner-up (Episode 102)
Ayşegül Doğan (Season 1)	23	(Turkey)	4th runner-up (Episode 102)
Gülşah Yılmaz (Season 3)	32	(Turkey)	5th runner-up (Episode 102)
Ezgi Ünal (Season 3)	26	(Turkey)	Eliminated in Episode 96
Sima Şerafettinova (Season 3)	17	(Azerbaijan)	Entered in Episode 73; Eliminated in Episode 96
Gülay Hançer (Season 2)	32	(Austria)	Entered in Episode 67; Eliminated in Episode 90
Emel Özkızıltaş (Season 2)	28	(Azerbaijan)	Eliminated in Episode 84
Aycan & Nurcan Şencan (Season 1)	28	(Sweden)	Eliminated in Episode 84
Neda Poursaeid (Season 3)	27	(Iran)	Entered in Episode 73; Eliminated in Episode 78
Sinem Umaş (Season 3)	31	(Turkey)	Entered in Episode 55; Eliminated in Episode 72
İlbige Uzun (Season 2)	18	(Netherlands)	Entered in Episode 55; Eliminated in Episode 66
Ezgi Baylar (Season 1)	32	(Turkey)	Eliminated in Episode 60
Zeynep Öztürk (Season 2)	31	(Turkey)	Entered in Episode 43; Eliminated in Episode 54
Sara Koçoğlu (Season 1)	20	(Turkey)	Entered in Episode 31; Eliminated in Episode 48
Nazlı Hamarat (Season 2)	27	(Turkey)	Entered in Episode 7 Eliminated in Episode 42
Melek Balkan (Season 1)	24	(Bosnia and Herzegovina)	Entered in Episode 31; Eliminated in Episode 36
Nazlı Sultan Kayaaslan (Season 2)	25	(Egypt)	Quit in Episode 31
Didem Akın (Season 3)	19	(Turkey)	Entered in Episode 19; Eliminated in Episode 30
Tuğçe Ergişi (Season 1)	26	(Turkey)	Eliminated in Episode 18
Gizem Güler (Season 1)	25	(Turkey)	Eliminated in Episode 12
Maria Surina (Season 2)	26	(Turkmenistan)	Eliminated in Episode 6

== Season 5 (Celebrities) ==
=== Contestants ===
Contestants	Age	Origin	Elimination
Gizem Özdilli	43	(Azerbaijan)	Winner (Episode 30)
Pelin Suade	36	(Greece)	1st runner-up (Episode 30)
Simge Tertemiz	27	(Turkey)	2nd runner-up (Episode 30)
Tuğçe Özbudak	33	(Turkey)	3rd runner-up (Episode 30)
Berna Öztürk	31	(Bosnia and Herzegovina)	4th runner-up (Episode 30)
Nil Karataş	32	(Turkey)	Eliminated in Episode 29
İnci Pars	35	(Cyprus)	Eliminated in Episode 28
Sevil Uyar	33	(Turkey)	Eliminated in Episode 27
Aslızen	38	(Turkey)	Eliminated in Episode 26
Esra Balamir	40	(Turkey)	Eliminated in Episode 25
Hatice	37	(Turkey)	Eliminated in Episode 24
Elif Ece Uzun	31	(Georgia (country))	Eliminated in Episode 24
Yasemin Öztürk	41	(Turkey)	Eliminated in Episode 18
Yeşim Erçetin	36	(Turkey)	Eliminated in Episode 18
Neslihan Önder	28	(Turkey)	Eliminated in Episode 12
Esra Sönmezer	33	(Albania)	Eliminated in Episode 6

== Season 6 ==
=== Contestants ===
Contestants	Age	Origin	Elimination
Yeşim Aydın	21	(Turkey)	Winner (Episode 54)
Bahar Candan	18	(Turkey)	1st runner-up (Episode 54)
Meral Avcı	29	(Turkey)	2nd runner-up (Episode 54)
Selay Topçuoğlu	32	(Turkey)	3rd runner-up (Episode 54)
Ayshan Ojaghverdiyeva	25	(Azerbaijan)	Entered in Episode 25; 4th runner-up (Episode 54)
Yağmur Taktaş (deceased 2024)	20	(Turkey)	5th runner-up (Episode 54)
Tuğba İldiz	28	(Turkey)	6th runner-up (Episode 54)
Zeynep Vuran	23	(Bulgaria)	Eliminated in Episode 48
Berrak Deniz	28	(Turkey)	Entered in Episode 25; Eliminated in Episode 48
Lara Su Özsoy	19	(Turkey)	Entered in Episode 25; Eliminated in Episode 42
Dilara Yaşar	23	(Turkey)	Eliminated in Episode 36
Damla Okuklu	24	(Turkey)	Entered in Episode 25; Eliminated in Episode 30
Esin Çepni	23	(Turkey)	Eliminated in Episode 24
Melike Çamlıoğlu	19	(Turkey)	Eliminated in Episode 18
Özge Sarı	25	(Russia)	Eliminated in Episode 12
Dicle Turgal	35	(Turkey)	Eliminated in Episode 6

== Season 7 ==
=== Contestants ===
Contestant	Age	Province	Elimination
Simay Tokatlı	23	(Turkey) İzmir	Winner (Episode 156)
Merve Sevin	20	(Turkey) İzmir	Entered in Episode 37; 1st runner-up (Episode 156)
Neslihan Doğrusöz	30	(Turkey) Istanbul	Entered in Episode 91; 2nd runner-up (Episode 156)
Aleyna Eroğlu	20	(Turkey) Tunceli	3rd runner-up (Episode 156)
Dilara Taşkın	20	(Turkey) Mersin	4th runner-up (Episode 156)
Duygu Çevik	20	(Turkey) Istanbul	Eliminated in Episode 54; Reentered in Episode 85; 5th runner-up (Episode 156)
Tuğçe Ekim	24	(Turkey) Istanbul	Entered in Episode 115; 6th runner-up (Episode 156)
Burcu Yakasız	22	(Turkey) Istanbul	Entered in Episode 133; 7th runner-up (Episode 156)
Emine Aydın	29	(Turkey) Mersin	Entered in Episode 73; Eliminated in Episode 150
Gamze Taşkın	25	(Turkey) Sakarya	Entered in Episode 127; Eliminated in Episode 150
Vefa Alizade	25	(Azerbaijan) Baku	Entered in Episode 139; Eliminated in Episode 144
Bahar Candan	19	(Turkey) Mersin	Entered in Episode 11; Eliminated in Episode 144
Deniz Serkanova	42	(Azerbaijan) Istanbul	Entered in Episode 12; Eliminated in Episode 132
Damla Gezen	21	(Turkey) Istanbul	Entered in Episode 121; Eliminated in Episode 126
Maryam Haeri	34	(Iran) Istanbul	Entered in Episode 109; Eliminated in Episode 120
Tuğba Çiğdem	24	(Turkey) İzmir	Entered in Episode 6 Eliminated in Episode 24; Reentered in Episode 67; Eliminated in Episode 114
Nergiz Nesrullayeva	19	(Azerbaijan) Baku	Entered in Episode 103; Eliminated in Episode 108
Selin Baygüneşli	25	(Turkey) İzmir	Entered in Episode 97; Eliminated in Episode 102
Niran Yalaz	20	(Turkey) Bursa	Eliminated in Episode 96
Aybüke Kemiyeva	26	(Turkmenistan) Istanbul	Entered in Episode 79; Eliminated in Episode 90
Berna Doğan	25	(Turkey) Diyarbakır	Entered in Episode 61; Eliminated in Episode 84
Gizem Ay	29	(Turkey) Istanbul	Entered in Episode 61; Eliminated in Episode 78
Müşerref Aydoğdu	30	(Turkey) Antalya	Entered in Episode 55; Eliminated in Episode 72
Bahar Değerli	30	(Turkey) Istanbul	Entered in Episode 55; Eliminated in Episode 66
Aylin & Selin Ençok	21	(Turkey) Bursa	Eliminated in Episode 60
Gülce Lale	27	(Turkey) İzmir	Entered in Episode 43; Disqualified in Episode 59
Mine Çetinkaya	25	(Turkey) Ankara	Entered in Episode 49; Quit in Episode 51
Esin Çelik	41	(Turkey) Istanbul	Entered in Episode 22; Eliminated in Episode 48
Nazlıcan Arkan (deceased 2019)	23	(Turkey) Tunceli	Entered in Episode 31; Eliminated in Episode 42
Melek Özçağan	27	(Turkey) Kars	Eliminated in Episode 36
Çağla Sarıoğlu	23	(Turkey) Istanbul	Entered in Episode 24; Eliminated in Episode 30
Elçin & Ezgi Akar	27	(Turkey) Ordu	Entered in Episode 18; Eliminated in Episode 22
Nazlı Ersoy	30	(Bosnia and Herzegovina) Istanbul	Eliminated in Episode 18
Dilara Kayalı	23	(Turkey) Erzincan	Eliminated in Episode 12
Yağmur Gürgen	27	(Turkey) Istanbul	Eliminated in Episode 11
Çağla Şen	24	(Turkey) Istanbul	Eliminated in Episode 6
