= Serter =

Serter is a surname, likely of Turkish origin. Notable people with the surname include:

- Nur Serter (born 1948), Turkish academic and politician
- Öykü Serter (born 1975), Turkish TV presenter, actress, and DJ
