= Ivana Sert =

Serbian-Turkish TV personality, model, and fashion designer (born 1979)

Ivana Sert Ивана Серт
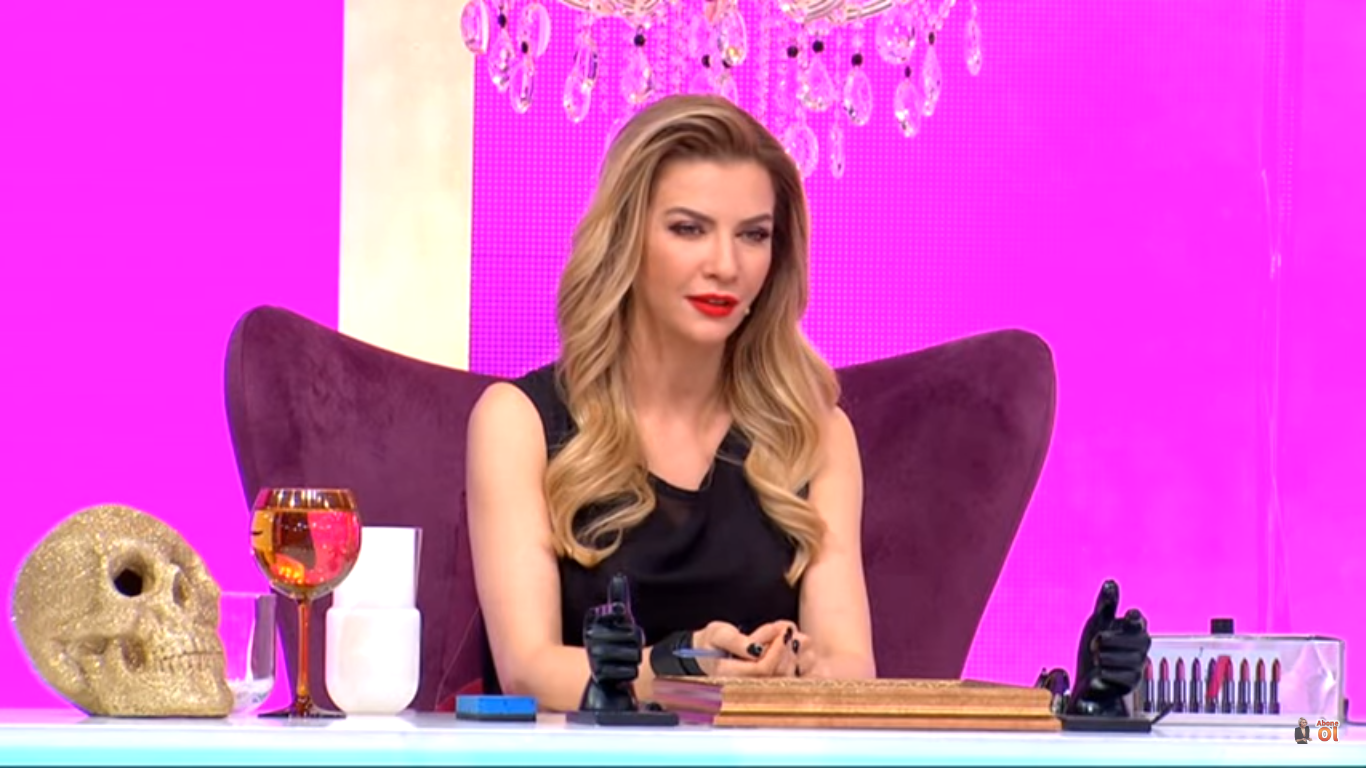
- Sert on İşte Benim Stilim in 2016
- Born: Ivana Smiljković; 25 October 1979 (age 46); Zaječar, Yugoslavia
- Citizenship: SFRY (1979–1992); FRY (1992–2003); SCG (2003–2006); Republic of Serbia (2006–present); Republic of Turkey (2009–present)
- Years active: 1999–present
- Agent: Uğurkan Erez Agency
- Height: 1.72 m (5 ft 7 1/2 in)
- Title: Miss Belgrade
- Term: 1999
- Spouses: Yurdal Sert (m. 2004; div. 2013) Sezer Dermenci (m. 2021)
- Children: 1

Ivana Sert (née Smiljković, Serbo-Croatian Cyrillic: Ивана Серт; born 25 October 1979) is a Serbian-Turkish television personality, socialite, presenter, model, fashion designer, entrepreneur, businesswoman, beauty pageant titleholder, author, and occasional actress. She is the founder of the Ivana Sert brand and was known for her role as a judge on Show TV's Bugün Ne Giysem? (2010–13). After that Sert joined the TV show İşte Benim Stilim.

== Early life and career ==
She was born as Ivana Smiljković in 1979 in Zaječar, Yugoslavia. Before pursuing a career in modeling, she studied piano and ballet until the age of 16. Having been crowned Miss Belgrade in 1999, she competed in the Miss Yugoslavia and Miss Globe International pageants.

In 2002, she moved to Turkey. It was in Istanbul that she met her husband Yurdal, son of prominent real estate developer Mehmet Sert. The couple married in 2004 and became leading figures in Turkish high society. On 31 October 2006, she gave birth to her only child, Kayon Ateş.

In 2011, after heating up the stage on Yok Böyle Dans, the Turkish version of Dancing With the Stars, Ivana Sert withdrew from the competition because of her doctor's advice in week 12.

In 2012, Sert appeared as a special guest star in the thirty fourth episode of the Kanal D series Yalan Dünya as herself. She is the co-host of the television program En Büyük Show that airs on Show TV.

Ivana Sert is the author of the 2012 book Bizimlesin. The book gives out fashion and beauty tips, accompanied by her own photos.

As of 2018, she is a member of the judging panel of another fashion-related show.

== Filmography ==
=== Film and television ===
Year	Title	Role	Notes
2011–13	Bugün Ne Giysem?	Judge	TV show
2011	Yok Böyle Dans	Herself	TV show
2012	En Büyük Show	Co-host	TV show
2014	Yapışık Kardeşler	Vahşi Cazibe	Movie
2014–2017	İşte Benim Stilim	Judge	TV show

=== Guest appearances ===
Year	Title	Role	Notes
2012	Yalan Dünya	Herself	TV series (1 episode)

== Discography ==
- "İmalat Hatası" (2019)

== Publications ==
- Bizimlesin (2012)
