= Can Maxim Mutaf =

Turkish-Russian basketball player (born 1991)

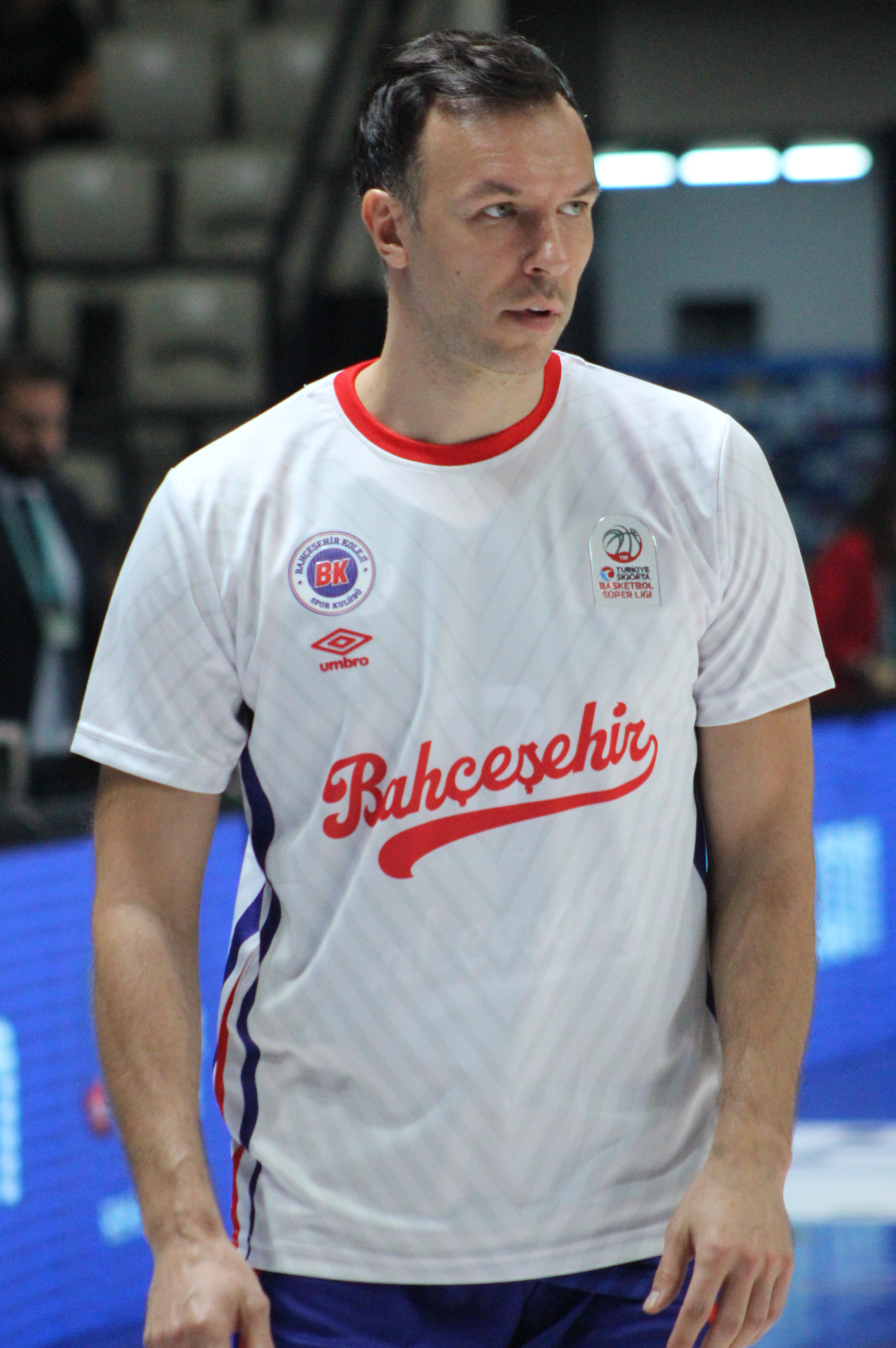

No. 17 – Bahçeşehir Koleji
- Position: Shooting guard / small forward
- League: Basketbol Süper Ligi

Personal information
- Born: January 9, 1991 (age 35) Maltepe, Istanbul, Turkey
- Listed height: 6 ft 4 in (1.93 m)
- Listed weight: 209 lb (95 kg)

Career information
- NBA draft: 2013: undrafted
- Playing career: 2006–present

Career history
- 2006–2013: Fenerbahçe
- 2009–2010: → FMV Işıkspor Istanbul
- 2011–2012: → Mersin BB
- 2013: → Pınar Karşıyaka
- 2013–2014: Trabzonspor
- 2014–2016: Banvit
- 2016–2017: Anadolu Efes
- 2017–2019: Beşiktaş
- 2019–2021: Bursaspor
- 2021–2022: Darüşşafaka
- 2022–2023: Büyükçekmece Basketbol
- 2023–present: Bahçeşehir Koleji

Career highlights
- Turkish BSL champion (2008)
Medals
Men's basketball
Representing Turkey
FIBA Europe Under-18 Championship
Bronze medal – third place	2009 France	U-18 Team
Mediterranean Games
Gold medal – first place	2013 Mersin	Team

Can Maxim Mutaf (Russian: Джан Максим Мутаф; born January 9, 1991 in Maltepe, Istanbul, Turkey) is a Turkish-Russian professional basketball player for Bahçeşehir Koleji of the Basketbol Süper Ligi (BSL).

== Professional career ==
Mutaf began his career with Fenerbahçe Istanbul in the 2006–07 season. It was around this time that he became the second-youngest player in Euroleague history to start there, behind only Aleksandar Ugrinoski in terms of age. He spent the 2009–10 season on loan with FMV Isiskspor Istanbul in the Turkish 2nd Division. In 2011, he moved to Mersin BB.

He returned to Fenerbahçe Istanbul for the 2012–13 season. In January 2013, he joined Pınar Karşıyaka. For the 2013–14 season, he moved to Trabzonspor.

He then joined Banvit in 2014. In 2016, he moved to Anadolu Efes. In July 2017, he signed with Beşiktaş.

On November 6, 2019, he has signed with Bursaspor of the Turkish Basketball League (BSL). Mutaf re-signed with the team on July 16, 2020.

On June 23, 2021, he has signed with Darüşşafaka of the Basketball Super League.

On June 26, 2022, he has signed with Büyükçekmece Basketbol of the Basketbol Süper Ligi (BSL).

On July 13, 2023, he signed a one-year deal with Bahçeşehir Koleji of the Basketbol Süper Ligi (BSL).

== International career ==
Mutaf was a regular member of the junior national teams of Turkey. With the Turkish junior national teams, he played at the following tournaments: the 2007 FIBA Europe Under-16 Championship, the 2008 FIBA Europe Under-18 Championship, the 2009 FIBA Europe Under-18 Championship, where he won a bronze medal, the 2010 FIBA Europe Under-20 Championship, and at the 2011 FIBA Europe Under-20 Championship.

He has also been a member of the senior men's Turkish national basketball team.

== Personal life ==
Mutaf has a Turkish father and a Russian mother, elder brother of Sarper David Mutaf and both brothers also has Russian citizenship. He is married to Turkish internet celebrity Duygu Özaslan.

== See also ==
- List of youngest EuroLeague players
