= Nur Yerlitaş =

Turkish fashion designer (1955–2020)

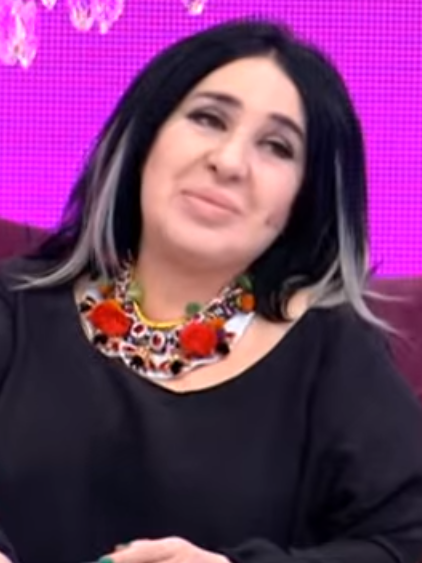
- Yerlitaş in March 2016
- Born: Nuray Yerlitaş; 11 August 1955; Istanbul, Turkey
- Died: 27 April 2020 (aged 64); Istanbul, Turkey
- Other name: "Nurella"
- Occupation: Fashion designer
- Television: İşte Benim Stilim

Nuray "Nur" Yerlitaş (11 August 1955 – 27 April 2020) was a Turkish fashion designer.

== Life ==
Nur Yerlitaş was born on 11 August 1955 in the Vefa, Istanbul. She was of Arab descent from her mother's side, and of Turkish descent from her father's side. She started her career by selling accessories from Italy. In the following years she opened her own boutique and entered into designing business.

In August 2018, Yerlitaş was diagnosed with brain cancer, for which she underwent surgery. She had a second surgery in March 2019. She died on 27 April 2020 at her home in Istanbul. Her funeral was held at Zincirlikuyu Mosque and her body was buried at Ulus Cemetery.

== Filmography ==
Television

- Bak Kim Dans Ediyor (2007)
- Yemekteyiz (2010)
- Bugün Ne Giysem (2011)
- Bu Tarz Benim (2014)
- İşte Benim Stilim (2015–2017)
- Maral: En Güzel Hikâyem (2015) – episode 9

Music videos

- "Türkan" – Demet Akalın (2011)
- "Karagözlüm" – Serkan Kaya (2019)

Commercials

- Yedigün (2015)
