= Danla Bilic =

Turkish Internet personality and YouTuber

- Born: Neslihan Damla Aktepe; 5 October 1994 (age 31); Kütahya, Turkey

YouTube information
- Channel: danlabilic
- Years active: 2016–present
- Genres: Comedy; make-up; vlog
- Subscribers: 2.99 million
- Views: 563 million
- Last updated: 31 July 2025

Neslihan Damla Aktepe (born 5 October 1994), better known as Danla Bilic, is a Turkish Internet personality and beauty YouTuber.

Aktepe first drew attention to herself by a series of incidents on Twitter. Aktepe, who opened a makeup channel on YouTube, gained a significant number of subscribers over a short period. Subsequently, her style of content diversified to include vlogs, joint broadcasts with singers, models, and other Internet celebrities. She also participated in various television programs. Throughout her career, Aktepe's behavior was occasionally criticized and legal proceedings were initiated by some individuals and institutions against her.

As of May 2020, Aktepe has 2.6 million subscribers on YouTube.

== Life and career ==
Aktepe was born on 5 October 1994 in Kütahya to a family of Circassian origin. As she would constantly misspell her name as Danla during her childhood, and since she was a fan of Beşiktaş manager Slaven Bilić, she decided to use the name Danla Bilic for her career on the Internet.

=== Breakthrough ===
Aktepe first became recognized on the Internet through Twitter. In late 2015, Aktepe contacted football players such as Alper Potuk, Nadir Çiftçi, Léonard Kweuke, Emre Çolak and Thibaut Courtois via direct message on Instagram and sent messages containing the phrase "Send me your number". By publicly publishing their responses on Twitter, Aktepe managed to get the attention of social media users and various media organizations in Turkey. In her attempt to send these messages, Aktepe was influenced by the messages that Cristiano Ronaldo sent to Turkish model Cansu Taşkın.

=== YouTube career ===
Aktepe opened her YouTube channel under the name Danla Bilic in 2016. The video titled "Yeditepe University 50% Scholarship Girl Makeup", which was uploaded to the channel in November 2016, helped with increasing her fame and similar videos were published afterwards. In 2017, the number of followers onAktepe's YouTube and Twitter platforms increased significantly. In August 2017, she quarreled with Sinan Binay, the cameraman who shot her videos, and Binay left the job. During this period, a number of Aktepe's jokes on Twitter in which she had pretended to be a trans person and had made fun of trans people resurfaced in the media and attracted criticism. In November 2017, Aktepe was invited to the popular talk show Beyaz Show.

In December 2017, after her channel was closed for a short time and then reopened, Aktepe announced on Twitter that she had closed the channel by mistake. During the same period, due to a video published on her channel in which she was caught saying "Commit suicide, get rid of this life" the prosecutor's office opened an investigation against Aktepe after receiving complaints that she was "encouraging young people to commit suicide".

Between 2016 and 2018, Aktepe hosted people such as Ece Seçkin, İrem Derici, Merve Özbey, Kerimcan Durmaz, İrem Sak, Ziynet Sali and Derya Uluğ on her channel. In 2018, Aktepe got into a feud with writer and behavioral scientist Aşkım Kapışmak. Kapışmak later filed a lawsuit against Aktepe, claiming that she "damaged his reputation" by calling him a man "who lacked honor, with no character". In September 2018, the court dismissed the case, stating that there were not enough criminal elements available. In the last months of 2018, Kerimcan Durmaz, Aktepe and Enes Batur were sued by the Association for the Protection of Children from Harassment and Social Media, on the grounds that they "had a negative impact on children". Aktepe responded to the issue by saying, "When I was talking to myself at home, I thought 'Oh God, did I say something wrong now'. Ah, that's enough. We cannot talk. Am I a teacher, am I required to be a role model for everyone?" and "If a 10-year-old child watches us it's their family's fault".

== Personal life ==
In 2018, Aktepe separated from her boyfriend Berat Demir.

In July 2018, Aktepe underwent bariatric surgery. In 2019, she underwent rhinoplasty and blepharoplasty surgeries.

== Awards and nominations ==
Year	Award	Category	Result	Ref.
2017	44th Golden Butterfly Awards	Best YouTuber/Instagrammer	Nominated	
2018	45th Golden Butterfly Awards	Best YouTuber/Instagrammer	Nominated	
2019	Denebunu Awards	2019's Most Inspiring Influencer	Won	

== See also ==
- List of YouTubers
