= Kerimcan Durmaz =

Turkish Internet celebrity (born 1994)

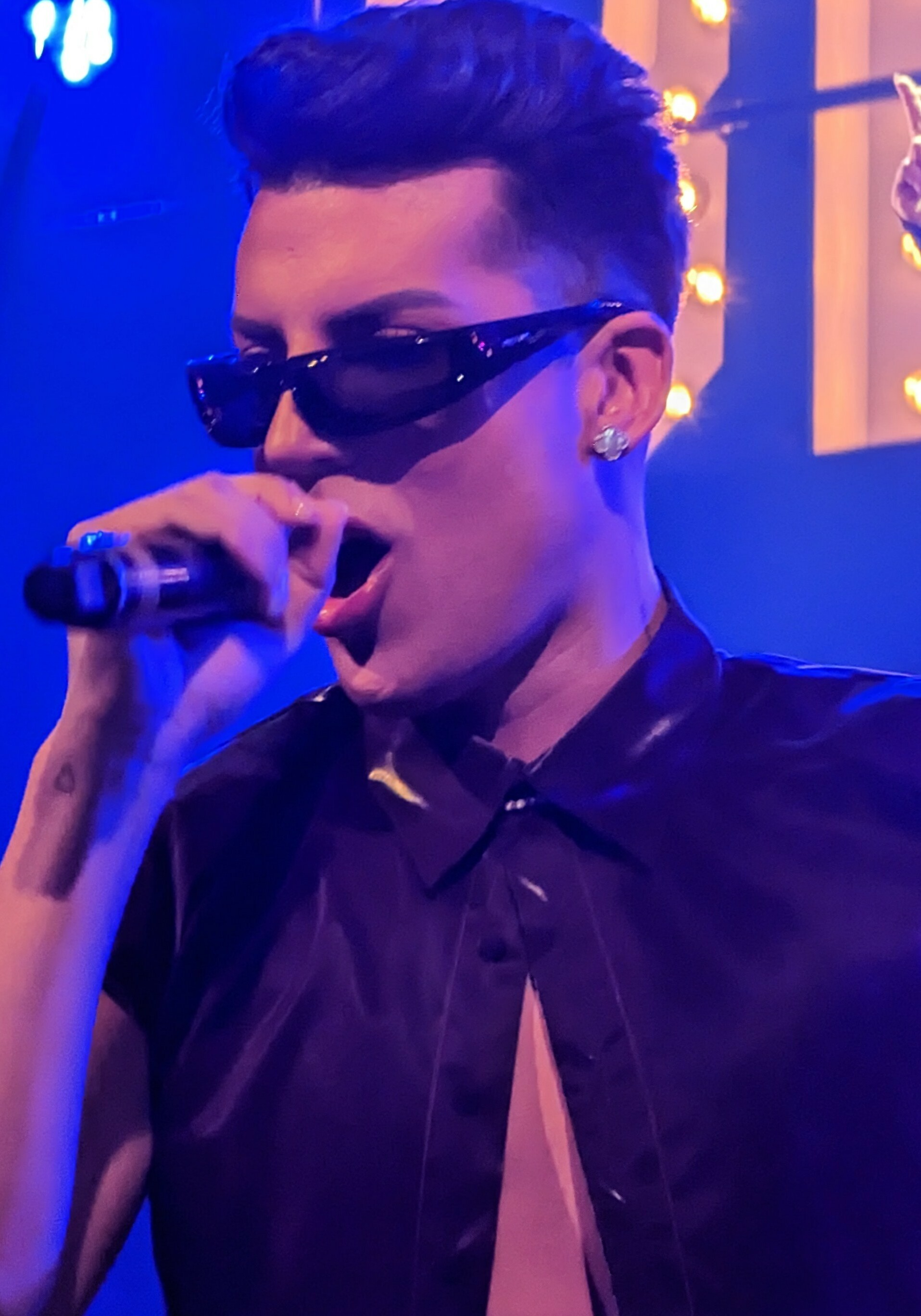
- Born: 2 November 1994 (age 31); Istanbul, Turkey
- Occupations: Social media personality; make-up artist; DJ; YouTuber; recording artist
- Years active: 2015–present

Kerimcan Durmaz (born 2 November 1994) is a Turkish singer, dancer, social media personality and make-up artist. Since 2015, he has been known in Turkey for the videos he publishes online.

== Biography ==
Kerimcan Durmaz was born on 2 November 1994 in Yeniköy, Istanbul. His mother is a housewife, while his father is a restaurant manager. He has two older sisters. After finishing high school, he went to Baku and worked as a make-up artist. In 2015, he started to become a social media celebrity by sharing videos on Periscope and Snapchat. He later returned to Istanbul and started to work as a DJ. In 2016, he received an offer to act in a leading role in a movie, the shooting of which began in December. In 2016–17, he became a judge on the seventh season of TV8's İşte Benim Stilim. On 30 November 2016, while performing at a place in Samsun, he became a victim of violence against LGBT people and someone injured him. Durmaz has been criticized by some columnists for being only known for his sexual orientation and homosexuality. In 2019, he was harshly criticized for accidentally publishing a video of himself masturbating through his Instagram story. During the COVID-19 pandemic in Turkey, he targeted people over 65 who were not obeying curfew measures through an Instagram story with the words: "Get out and die. Some of you will die, and we as young people will continue to be, do you want this?" In the indictment prepared by the Istanbul Chief Public Prosecutor's Office regarding his words, a prison sentence between 6 months to 1 year was demanded for him for 'encouraging people towards hatred and hostility or humiliation'.

Durmaz released his debut single, "Peşimde," in February 2021. The music video for the track was filmed in Los Angeles and in less than two weeks racked up over 14 million views.

== Television programs ==
- İşte Benim Stilim - Himself (judge) (2016)

== Discography ==
=== Singles ===
- "Peşimde" (2021)
- "Vida Loca" (2021)
- "K M N ?" (2022)
- "Bedel" (2023)
- "salla" (2025)
