= Ütopya =

Ütopya is the Turkish version of the Dutch TV series Utopia, created by John de Mol. The series follows a group of people who attempt to maintain a society in a remote area. The format was bought by Acun Ilıcalı and his television Tv8 began airing Ütopya on October 30, 2014. Tuncay Kes finished the show as the champion.

== Cast ==
This is the cast of the show on July 22, 2015

Name	Age	Occupation	City	Entry date	2nd Entry date
Altar Gültekin	23	Industrial design graduate	Istanbul	October 24, 2014	
Buket Ek	25	Actress	Istanbul	February 4, 2015	
Kaan Hoşgör	22	Cook/barista	İzmir	April 8, 2015	
Hafize Dilay Bedir	19	Student	Istanbul	May 16, 2015	
Murat Rışvan	37	Electronics technician	Istanbul	October 24, 2014	
Raşit Özçelik	34	Store owner	Antalya	May 6, 2015	
Semih Öztürk	25	Student	Istanbul	October 24, 2014	
Tuncay Kes	26	Climber	Mersin	October 24, 2014	
Çağlar Babilik	26	Store manager	İzmir	June 3, 2015	
Yıldız Onay	29	Store manager	London	June 17, 2015	
Serkan Ercan	29	Climber	Istanbul/Utah	October 24, 2014	July 3, 2015
Kurretülayn Matur	24	Actress	Istanbul	October 24, 2014	July 1, 2015
Pınar Par	29	Public relations / barista	İzmir	January 8, 2015	June 28, 2015
Noyan Uzer	20	Student	Istanbul	December 29, 2014	June 29, 2015
Bahadır Derici	27	Actor	Istanbul	March 19, 2015	July 2, 2015
Meral Avcı	27	Model	Istanbul	March 7, 2015	June 30, 2015

== Past Utopians ==
Name	Age	Occupation	City	The reason for quitting	Entry date	Exit date
Abidin Özşahin	37	Musician	Ankara	Nominated for elimination	December 1, 2014	February 20, 2015
Ahmet Arda Sezen	39	Medical sales representative	Ankara	Nominated for elimination	October 24, 2014	November 28, 2014
Barış Özdemir	24	Public relations	Istanbul	Disqualified	January 21, 2015	February 6, 2015
Caner Şeran	23	Tattoo artist	Tekirdağ	Rejected Candidate	February 19, 2015	February 26, 2015
Aybüke Taşçıoğlu	23	Student	Istanbul	Nominated for elimination	February 4, 2015	April 7, 2015
Çağdaş Tahsin Yıldız	31	Insurance broker	Istanbul	Disqualified	October 24, 2014	November 13, 2014
Cem Özer	29	Private sector	Istanbul	Rejected Candidate	April 8, 2015	April 14, 2015
Ece Pınar Kapan	25	Ceramic artist	İzmir	Rejected Candidate	March 11, 2015	March 18, 2015
Fide Birol	25	Public relations / media	Ankara	Rejected Candidate	January 8, 2015	January 15, 2015
Furkan Kurt	23	Student	İzmir	Rejected Candidate	January 21, 2015	January 28, 2015
Gamze Çetinkaya	25	Student / model	Istanbul	Nominated for elimination	October 24, 2014	December 29, 2014
Gökhan Bölükbaşı	28	Medical sales representative	Istanbul	Rejected Candidate	May 6, 2015	May 12, 2015
Göktan İleri	37	Cafe owner	Bodrum	Rejected Candidate	March 7, 2015	March 14, 2015
Hayrettin Can Ulupınar	30	Computer expert	Istanbul	Rejected Candidate	December 29, 2014	January 5, 2015
İnci Melek Bozkaya	27	Pastry Chef	Eskişehir	Nominated for elimination	October 24, 2014	November 14, 2014
İnci Satır	24	Store Owner	Istanbul	Nominated for elimination	October 24, 2014	February 6, 2015
Özlem Sezgin	40	Photographer	Istanbul	Nominated for elimination	October 24, 2014	January 12, 2015
Tezcan Fenerciler	23	Student / Model	Istanbul	Nominated for elimination	October 24, 2014	December 6, 2014
Tuğçe Aksoylu	24	Athletic trainer / referee	Ankara	Nominated for elimination	October 24, 2014	November 21, 2014
Türkan Gözcü	53	Retired	İzmir	Nominated for elimination	October 24, 2014	March 24, 2014
Züleyha Sevim	21	Hair dresser	Mersin	Rejected Candidate	April 22, 2015	May 3, 2015
Selin Soytürk	20	Student	Istanbul	Nominated for elimination	April 22, 2015	July 4, 2015
Harun Zeren	20	Student	Kocaeli	Rejected Candidate	February 19, 2015	June 20, 2015
Büşra Fethiye Çayır	20	Student	Ankara	Rejected Candidate	June 3, 2015	June 10, 2015
Serdar Gökay Akduman	23	Captain	Ankara	Rejected Candidate	June 17, 2015	June 19, 2015
