= Öykü Serter =

Turkish TV host and DJ

- Born: 26 February 1975 (age 50); Çankaya, Ankara, Turkey
- Education: TED Ankara College; Hacettepe University; Galatasaray University; Bahçeşehir University
- Occupations: TV presenter, actress, DJ

Öykü Serter (born 26 February 1975) is a Turkish TV presenter, actress, and DJ.

== Life and education ==
Serter was born on February 26, 1975, in Ankara. She graduated from TED Ankara College and went on to study American Culture and Literature as well as Latin Language and Literature at Hacettepe University. She earned a master’s degree in Radio and Television from Galatasaray University and is currently pursuing a doctorate in Cinema and Media at Bahçeşehir University.

== Career ==
She entered the media sector as a DJ at Capital Radio. She later took charge of the program 5T5 on Number 1 FM and Cine5. She later served as the presenter of several programs, including Biri Bizi Gözetliyor, Akademi Türkiye, and Anadolu Rüzgarı. In 2006, together with Ragga Oktay, Serter presented the contestant B.U.M.. In 2011, she began presenting the singing contest Star Akademi, with Ajda Pekkan, Ertuğrul Özkök and Sertab Erener as the judges. In 2014, she presented Bu Tarz Benim, followed by İşte Benim Stilim, Rising Star Türkiye and Fenomen in 2015. In March 2016, she appeared on the cover of Elele magazine.

== Filmography ==
As presenter

Year	Program
2022	Kısmetse Olur: Aşkın Gücü
2021	Şef Akademi Doğada
2021	Şef Akademi
2018	Survivor Panorama
2016	Göz6 Panorama
2016	Göz6
2016	İşte Benim Stilim
2016	Fenomen
2015	Rising Star Türkiye
2014	Bu Tarz Benim
2011	Star Akademi
2010	Bank Asya 1.Lig Günlüğü
2010	MasterChef Türkiye
2007	Acemi Birlik
2006	B.U.M.
2006	Anadolu Rüzgarı
2004	Akademi Türkiye
2001	Biri Bizi Gözetliyor

As actress

Year	Title	Role
2021	Etkileyici	Herself
2020	Konuşma	Anchorwoman
2012	İşler Güçler	Swimming teacher (guest actress)
2006	Ah Bir Polis Olsam	Yasemin
2004	İstanbul Şahidimdir	Ela

== Awards ==
Year	Title
2015	Best TV Presenter - Crystal Mouse Awards)
2015	Best Female TV Presenter - Golden Butterfly Awards - İşte Benim Stilim
2016	Most Successful TV Presenter - İTÜ EMÖS Achievement Awards
