= Elele (magazine) =

Turkish women's magazine

- Editor-in-chief: Gözde Kaynak
- Categories: Women's magazine; Fashion magazine
- Frequency: Monthly
- Publisher: Elele Doğan Burda Magazine Publishing and Marketing
- Founded: 1976; 49 years ago
- Company: Doğan Burda Group
- Country: Turkey
- Based in: Istanbul
- Language: Turkish

Elele (Turkish: Hand in Hand) is a monthly Turkish language women's fashion magazine which has been in circulation since 1976. It is based in Istanbul, Turkey and one of the oldest women's magazines in Turkey.

== History and profile ==
Elele was launched in 1976. The magazine is owned by Doğan Burda company and published by Elele Doğan Burda Magazine Publishing and Marketing on a monthly basis. The editor-in-chief of Elele is Gözde Kaynak, and the frequent contributors include Oben Budak, Kürşat Başar, Yonca Tokbaş ve Pucca. The magazine mostly covers articles on fashion, beauty, technology, automobile, decoration, health and psychology. Although it does not have a clear feminist focus, it carried articles on topics from women's perspectives, including sexual pleasure, employment and equal rights, during the late 1970s in addition to more regular topics such as fashion, home and childcare. In 1978 the Elele readers selected an article on women's rights as the most popular article published in the magazine.

Later Elele began to emphasize much more regular and popular topics. Furthermore, the 2019 issues of the magazine included advertisements and prices of some brands embedded in interviews with well-known Turkish women, including Gül Gölge and Ebru Şallı.
