= Somer Sivrioğlu =

Turkish chef and restaurateur (born 1971)

Somer Sivrioğlu is a Turkish chef and restaurateur.

He was born on 25 May 1971 in Istanbul, where he lived for 25 years.

Sivrioğlu has held a number of senior positions in the hospitality industry. He has been involved in launching restaurant chains, specialty eateries, and running national restaurants. In 2007, he opened his own restaurant, Efendy, in Balmain, Sydney but it closed in 2021. In 2016, Sivrioglu opened a new Sydney restaurant, Anason, in Barangaroo, Sydney.

Somer Sivrioğlu has written weekly columns for the Turkish community newspaper Yeni Vatan. He has also hosted the TV show Somer'in Mutfağı ("Somer's Kitchen") and the SBS Radio program Lezzete Yolculuk (Journey to Taste). He is also a judge on Turkey Master Chef.

== Restaurant ==
In March of 2022 Sivrioğlu and his business partners opened a restaurant in Istanbul Turkey, which, like his other restaurants, was named "Efendy".

== Conviction and prison ==
In May of 2022 a retaining wall in front of Sivrioğlu's Istanbul Efendy collapsed killing a former Jordanian diplomat and severely injuring another man. Sivrioğlu and his partners were indicted in turkish courts and Sivrioğlu faced up to 22.5 years in prison for negligence related to the collapsed wall.

In 2024 Chef Somer Sivrioğlu was convicted of "conscious negligence" for the retaining wall collapse in front of the Istanbul Efendy restaurant which injured one man and killed a former Jordanian diplomat. Sivrioğlu was sentenced to 5 years, 6 months, and 20 days.
