= TV8 (Turkish TV channel) =

Turkish television station

- Country: Turkey
- Broadcast area: Turkey; Azerbaijan; Northern Cyprus; Iran

Programming
- Language: Turkish
- Picture format: 1080i (HDTV)

Ownership
- Owner: Acun Medya; Doğuş Media Group
- Sister channels: Star TV; NTV

History
- Launched: 1 June 2014; 12 years ago (HD)

Links
- Website: www.tv8.com.tr

Availability

Terrestrial
- Digiturk: Channel 28 (HD)
- D-Smart: Channel 28 (HD)
- Tivibu: Channel 29 (HD)
- Türksat Kablo TV: Channel 29 (HD)

Streaming media
- Turkcell TV+: Channel 27 (HD)

TV8 (Turkish: TV Sekiz) is a Turkish free-to-air television channel owned by MNG Media Group, which started broadcasting on 22 February 1999. Its current owner is Acun Medya. Aside from having national coverage on terrestrial television, it is also carried on cable operators and satellite providers like Kablo TV, Tivibu, Digiturk and D-Smart.

TV8 as a news channel started broadcasting in 2005, becoming part of the format and logo by changing the entertainment channels. The programs include music, entertainment, game and talent shows, sports, talk shows, and news. On 17 March 2016, TV8 announced that it had acquired the Formula 1 broadcasting rights for one season. TV8 is the local broadcaster of TV shows like The Voice, Got Talent, Survivor and Utopia.

Following the transfer of Turksat 3A broadcasts to Turksat 4A, Turksat 5B, and Turksat 6A on August 16, 2026, SDTV broadcasting has ceased, and transmissions are now conducted exclusively in HDTV.

== Programs ==
- 2014–: O Ses Türkiye
- 2014: Ninja Warrior Türkiye, Hülya Avşar Show
- 2014–2015: Ver Fırına
- 2014–2017: Para Bende,Yetenek Sizsiniz Türkiye
- 2015–: Survivor
- 2015–2017: İşte Benim Stilim
- 2018–: Masterchef Türkiye

== Sports ==
- 2016: NBA Games 2016
- 2016: 2016–17 Premier League
- 2021–2024: Champions League
- 2021–2024: Europa League
- 2021–2024: Conference League
- 2024–2026: Nations League, European Qualifiers

== Series ==
- 2014-2015: Kaçak Gelinler
- 2015-Maral: En Güzel Hikayem
- 2015-Bana Baba Dedi
- 2018-2019: Kızım
- 2018-2019: Jet Sosyete
- 2020-2021: Doğduğun Ev Kaderindir
- 2020-2022: Kırmızı Oda
- 2021: Workshop
- 2022: Süslü Korkuluk
