= Eda Ece =

Turkish actress (born 1990)

Eda Ece Tuncer
- Eda Ece in 2025
- Born: Eda Ece Uzunalioğlu; 20 June 1990 (age 36); Istanbul, Turkey
- Occupation: Actress
- Years active: 2002–present
- Spouse: Buğrahan Tuncer (m. 2023)
- Children: 1

Eda Ece Tuncer (née Uzunalioğlu; born 20 June 1990) is a Turkish actress. She attracted the attention of her former manager Tümay Özokur in a theater play she performed at university and registered with the agency. Her professional acting career began after her manager introduced her to Gani Müjde.

Ece received training in many fields from a young age, but was most interested in theatre. Before 2011, she appeared in television series in minor roles. She had her first leading role in a television series with Pis Yedili (2011–2014). She later appeared in Beni Böyle Sev (2013–2014) and İlişki Durumu: Karışık (2015–2016). Most recently, she starred as the lead in Yasak Elma, which aired on FOX from 2018 to 2023. In addition to television series, Ece has also appeared in film projects. Her first leading film role was in Kızım İçin (2013). She later appeared in films such as Kocan Kadar Konuş (2015), Kocan Kadar Konuş: Diriliş (2016), Yol Arkadaşım (2017), and Deliha 2 (2018).

Eda Ece, who has appeared in highly rated television series and films, has received awards for her social responsibility projects and television series.

== Early life and education ==
She was born on 20 June 1990 in Istanbul. Her father is an electrical engineer and her mother is a housewife. She is the youngest of three daughters. One of her older sisters is a news anchor and the other is a lawyer. She is originally from Istanbul, where she was born and raised. Her paternal family is from Trabzon, while her maternal family is from Rize. She graduated from Şişli Terakki High School and subsequently from the Department of Psychology at Istanbul Bilgi University.

At the age of 13, she appeared on the cover of Heygirl magazine. While studying Psychology at Bilgi University, she began an internship at American Hospital. During her internship, she learned that there was a gallery called Operator Room at the hospital. She met the gallery's curator, Ekrem Yalçındağ, and worked with him at several exhibitions held there. Yalçındağ later took Ece to a gallery called Dreamart. She began working there as a volunteer and occasionally attended fairs abroad. Eda Ece, who said that she loved the gallery and had met many new people there, continued working at the gallery for some time.

== Career ==
=== 2002–2011: Before professional career ===
Eda Ece appeared in minor roles in several television series before beginning her professional television career. In 2002, she appeared in Mihriban, in Hayat Bilgisi in 2004, and in Aşkın Mucizeleri, in Bez Bebek in 2009, and in Adını Feriha Koydum in 2011.

=== 2011–2015: Beginning of professional career, Pis Yedili and Beni Böyle Sev ===
While at university, Eda Ece was watched in a theater play by Tümay Özokur, a manager who was a friend of her theater teacher at Şişli Terakki, who was impressed by her acting. He wanted to work with Eda Ece, and she joined an agency called Portakal Ajansı, which Özokur had established at the time. At the time, Ece was working at the Dreamart gallery and was not getting any work despite being registered with the agency. One day, she encountered her manager Tümay Özokur on Bağdat Avenue, while he was casting for Pis Yedili, created by Gani Müjde. Özokur told her, "They are looking for an actress like you, blonde but level-headed, genuine, a Cimbom fan. Let me introduce you to Gani Müjde." Two days later, Özokur called Ece and told her, "There is a role called Cimbom. I recommended you, come immediately." Ece subsequently auditioned for the role of Cimbom. After acting opposite Kadir Doğulu, who had previously been selected as the lead actor, she passed the audition and joined the series. Thus, when the series began on 25 October 2011, she played her first leading role in the series alongside Kadir Doğulu and Ayşegül Aldinç. Her recognition increased with the series. The character Cimbom gained many fans. In an interview, she said that she dyed her brown hair blonde for the character. In another interview, she said that she struggled somewhat at the beginning of filming and it took her some time to get used to the character. The series was cancelled on 24 June 2014 without a proper finale due to financial difficulties at the production company. For her performance in the series, Ece won the Best Young Female Lead Actress in a Youth Series award at the 4th Ayaklı Gazete Awards in 2013. In 2013, she played the lead role in the film Kızım İçin. After Pis Yedili ended, she portrayed the character "Zeyno" in the television series Beni Böyle Sev, which began airing on TRT 1 in 2013 and whose cast she joined in 2014. She left the series in 2015.

=== 2015–2017: Kocan Kadar Konuş, Mahrumlar, Görümce, İlişki Durumu: Karışık and Yol Arkadaşım ===
In 2015, she appeared in Kocan Kadar Konuş and its 2016 sequel Kocan Kadar Konuş: Diriliş in the role of Ceren. That same year, she appeared alongside İsmail Hacıoğlu and Ayşen Gruda in the television film Mahrumlar, and appeared alongside Gupse Özay and Buğra Gülsoy in the film Görümce. Between 2015 and 2016, she portrayed the character "Elif Güvener" in the television series İlişki Durumu: Karışık, which aired on Show TV and starred herself, Berk Oktay, Seren Şirince, and Pamir Pekin. In 2017, she appeared in two films: Dede Korkut Hikayeleri: Deli Dumrul and Yol Arkadaşım.

=== 2018–present: Deliha 2, Yasak Elma, Maske Kimsin Sen?, Disney+ ===
In 2018, she appeared in the film Deliha 2, written, directed, and starring Gupse Özay. For her role in this film, she was nominated in the Best Female Film Actor category at the Turkey Youth Awards in 2019. Most recently, she played the lead role of "Yıldız Yılmaz" in the television series Yasak Elma, which aired on FOX from 2018 to 2023. In the series, she was paired with actors such as Talat Bulut, Gökhan Alkan, Berk Oktay, and Murat Aygen. The series is also Ece's longest-running project after Pis Yedili. In a YouTube interview, she said that people in real life addressed her as Yıldız and that she had become known by that character. The series is broadcast in more than 30 countries and has attracted particular attention in Latin America and the Middle East. Eda Ece won the Actress of the Year award at the 3rd Career Honorary Awards in 2019, the Most Stylish Female Actress of the Year award at the Altier Academy Fashion Awards in 2021, based on a survey conducted among Altier Academy students, and the Best Female Actress of the Year award at the Face To Fest Awards organized by Kocaeli University in 2022. She was also nominated for Best Actress at the 46th Golden Butterfly Awards in 2020 and in the Best Female Television Actress category at the 6th Turkey Youth Awards. In 2020, she appeared as a guest actress in the film Feride, written and directed by Zeynep Çamcı. At the beginning of 2022, alongside Melis Sezen, Alican Yücesoy, and Doğu Demirkol, she served as a judge on Maske Kimsin Sen?, the Turkish adaptation of The Masked Singer, which is broadcast in many countries. Maske Kimsin Sen? was investigated by the RTÜK following reactions that the masks used in the competition negatively affected children and allegations that the competition was filled with satanic and pagan rituals, and ended on 12 February. In response to criticism of the program, Ece wrote on her Twitter account, "Maske Kimsin Sen is a competition format that exists all over the world. The countries where 'Masked Singer' is broadcast are attached. Including Saudi Arabia, Morocco, Tunisia, the United Arab Emirates, and Egypt." In the show's finale, she said, "America has only just started season 7. Even Saudi Arabia is in season 3 or 4. It saddened me greatly that it lasted such a short time in this country. Because it was a competition featuring dance, entertainment, singing, and happiness. There was nothing else in it. It was a great idea to offer the audience a visual spectacle and to see different formats during these difficult days. Personally, I am proud of the work I did. We really loved the mask. I am very sad that it has ended now." She became the brand ambassador of Disney+, a digital platform that launched in Turkey on 14 June 2022.

It was announced that the "Yıldız" character from Yasak Elma would be made into a film by Disney+ after the series ended, with Ece also starring in the film.

== Personal life ==
Ece has been in a relationship with basketball player Buğrahan Tuncer since 2019. The couple married on 21 June 2023. Their daughter, Mina İpek Tuncer, was born on 4 April 2024.

== Other work and activities ==
While in London, Ece announced that she had written several comedy scripts and would bring these projects to life.

At the ELLE Style Awards in 2022, she was invited to the awards ceremony to present Haluk Akakçe with the "Artist of the Year with Style" award.

=== Philanthropy ===
In 2020, days before her birthday, she launched a donation campaign for the Turkish Cancer Society through her Instagram and Twitter accounts. The campaign continued until her birthday on 20 June. That same year, she asked the Ministry of Health for assistance with obtaining medication needed by the son of her domestic helper, who had epilepsy. The Ministry of Health responded quickly to Eda Ece, after which Ece thanked them for their assistance. Later that year, she announced that she had taken responsibility for a child named "Mutano" living in Kenya. She announced this on social media by sharing a photograph of the words "Thank you Eda Ece", which Mutano had written on the ground with stones, and said, "The best people in the world, who find people in need and help them, we have helped many people in our country and around the world; you should follow them too. Of course, I also sent Mutano a video. I hope we meet one day, my dear smiling one. Be grateful for everything you have and try to help those in need who cross your path. There are lives being lived under such difficult conditions that my heart aches when I see the injustice of this world; it makes me angry too. Mutano had no drinking water or clothes to wear. I am now by his side, but there are many more people, so please be there for them too. My dear Mutano, I am always here for you! Even if I am on the other side of the world..." She sent a water tank to Kenya in her own name.

== Filmography ==
Television series
Year	Title	Role	Notes
2002	Mihriban	-	Guest appearance
2004	Aşkın Mucizesi	-	Guest appearance
2004	Hayat Bilgisi	Sude	Guest appearance
2009	Bez Bebek	Cemre	Guest appearance
2011	Adını Feriha Koydum	Deniz	Guest appearance
2011–2014	Pis Yedili	Günçiçek Seymen (Cimbom)	Leading role
2014–2015	Beni Böyle Sev	Zeyno	Joined
2015–2016	İlişki Durumu: Karışık	Elif Güvener	Leading role
2018–2023	Yasak Elma	Yıldız Yılmaz	Leading role
2026–present	Tuzlu Kahve	Derin Kutaygil	Leading role
Cinema and television films
Year	Title	Role	Notes
2010	Mahpeyker: Kösem Sultan	-	Supporting role
2013	Kızım İçin	Tuğba	Leading role
2015	Kocan Kadar Konuş	Ceren	Supporting role
2016	Kocan Kadar Konuş: Diriliş	Ceren	Supporting role
2016	Görümce	Deniz	Leading role
2016	Mahrumlar	Ela	Leading role
2017	Yol Arkadaşım	Aysun	Leading role
2017	Dede Korkut Hikayeleri: Deli Dumrul	Günçiçek	Leading role
2018	Deliha 2	Eda	Leading role
2020	Feride	-	Supporting role

=== Programming ===
Programming
Year	Title	Notes
2022	Maske Kimsin Sen?	judge
2022–2023	Kapımdaki Dedektif	presenter
2025	Yetenek Sizsiniz Türkiye	judge

== Music video cameos ==
Year	Title (Artist)	Reference
2016	Durum Leyla (Ayşegül Aldinç)	
2020	Her Mevsim Yazım (Zeynep Bastık)	

== Awards and nominations ==
=== Turkey Youth Awards ===
Year	Category	Work	Result
2019	Best Movie Actress	Deliha 2	Nominated
2020	Best TV Actress	Yasak Elma	Nominated
2023	Best TV Actress	Yasak Elma	Nominated

=== Murex D'Or ===
Year	Category	Work	Result
2022	Best Foreign Actress	Yasak Elma	Won

=== Pantene Golden Butterfly Awards ===
Year	Category	Work	Result
2023	Best Female Presenter	Kapimdaki Dedektif	Nominated
