= Turquazz Festival =

Anatolian jazz and roots festival in London

Turquazz Anatolian Jazz & Roots Festival
- Genre: Jazz
- Dates: All the year round
- Location(s): London, England
- Years active: 2019–present
- Website: turquazz.org

The Turquazz Festival is an annual Anatolian Jazz and Roots festival which was initially delivered with 14 events across 11 venues in London between 13–30 March 2019, welcoming 26 artists with a live audience of 835 people. The festival is produced by Loyka Visual Arts, with Batu Akyol as Festival Director and Özlem Dinç as Business & Marketing Director. It is the first-ever Anatolian/Turkish jazz festival in the UK aiming jazz fans, experimental culture fans, and foodies.

The festival includes one supper club, one tango dancing night, six live performances, one documentary screening day, one talk and one workshop have been delivered under the concept of Anatolian Jazz and Roots.

The festival is supported using public funding by the National Lottery through Arts Council England. Sponsors include the Embassy of Turkey, London, Yunus Emre Institute, Turkish Airlines, MYRA, Radisson Blu, Laz Restaurant, and SOAS University of London.

== Full list of artists ==
Anıl Şallıel, Barış Demirel, Batu Şallıel, Baturay Yarkın, Can Çankaya, Cem Tuncer, Dursun Can Çakın, Debora İpekel, Erhan Seçkin, Erkan Oğur, Halil İbrahim Işık, Francesco Martinelli, Kağan Yıldız, Mehmet Özen, Melisa Yıldırım, Murat Meriç, Nağme Yarkın, Ozan Musluoğlu, Önder Focan, Suat Karakuş, Tolga Zafer Özdemir, Turgut Alp Bekoğlu.
