= Yasak Elma =

- Promotional poster
- Also known as: Forbidden Fruit
- Genre: Drama; Romance
- Written by: Melis Civelek; Zeynep Gür
- Directed by: Neslihan Yeşilyurt (1–74); Murat Öztürk (75–110); Ece Erdek Koçoğlu (111–177)
- Starring: Eda Ece; Şevval Sam; Nesrin Cavadzade; Biran Damla Yılmaz; Murat Aygen; Şebnem Dönmez; Sevda Erginci; Melisa Doğu; Berk Oktay; Talat Bulut; Erdal Özyağcılar
- Theme music composer: Cem Tuncer; Ercüment Orkut; Efecan Tuncer
- Country of origin: Turkey
- Original language: Turkish
- No. of seasons: 6
- No. of episodes: 177

Production
- Producer: Fatih Aksoy
- Production locations: Istanbul; Hatay
- Cinematography: Erhan Makar (1-110); Hakan Dinçkuyucu (111-177)
- Camera setup: Single-camera
- Running time: 110-150 minutes
- Production company: Medyapım

Original release
- Network: Fox
- Release: 19 March 2018 – 5 June 2023

Yasak Elma (English title: Forbidden Apple) is a Turkish television series created by Medyapım, featuring actors Eda Ece and Şevval Sam. The show was written by Melis Civelek and Zeynep Gür, with Neslihan Yeşilyurt directing the first three seasons, Murat Öztürk taking over for the fourth season, and Ece Erdek Koçoğlu directing the fifth and sixth seasons.

== Plot ==
=== Season 1 ===
Ender, a woman from the high society and wife of successful businessman Halit Argun, hires Yıldız Yılmaz as her husband's personal waitress. Ender later offers money in return for Yıldız to seduce Halit so Ender can get finances after their divorce but Yıldız betrays Ender and exposes her plan. Halit divorces Ender upon learning the truth. She is left without money and begins her struggle to maintain her past position in society. Meanwhile, Yıldız and Halit get married.

Yıldız's sister Zeynep falls for her boss, Alihan Taşdemir.

=== Season 2 ===
Ender's and Yıldız's enmity and intrigue continue. Yıldız's first husband, Kemal, now well off, returns with a plan to take revenge on Yıldız, because she divorced him on the wedding day as she had been accepted for an acting opportunity. As Kemal was poor, she left him for fame and money. Later, Kemal and Yıldız fall for each other and Kemal asks Yıldız to choose between him and Halit. Yıldız finds it difficult to leave the life she has because of Halit. Kemal marries Zehra Argun, Yıldız's stepdaughter and Halit's daughter from his first wife, which disappoints Yıldız. Later, she successfully sends him away.

Ender's first love Kaya and his sister, Şahika are introduced. Halit is impressed by Şahika and her undeniable beauty and falls for her. Yıldız is pregnant at that time. Halit kicks her out of the house and she starts living in a village.

Ender and Kaya's son Yiğit, of whom Ender and Kaya are both unaware because Kaya never knew of Ender's pregnancy and Ender had given him for adoption when he was born, starts working for Şahika. He pushes Ender into the sea.

Zeynep and Alihan get married and leave for America.

=== Season 3 ===
Ender and Yıldız become friends against Şahika. Yıldız names her son Halit Can (his nickname Junior)and divorces Halit. Yıldız experiments with new career options, doing a weather show on TV and starts a project of producing apple puree using her grandmother's recipe. It turns out Şahika is working for Nadir who is Halit's enemy and he also becomes a partner in the company. Then Halit loses all of his money and shares and is forced to live with Sıtkı. Later, Şahika kills Nadir by poisoning him, and during his funeral shows up as his wife and winning all of his fortune. Ender marries Kaya, they also have 23 years old son. The season ends with Halit regaining his fortune and becoming Sahika's partner Holding Argun. Yıldız falls for Kerim, the director in Argun Holding hired by Şahika.

=== Season 4 ===
Kaya divorces Ender. Halit marries Ender again because thanks to her he knew that Yıldız was cheating on him with Kerim. Halit dies after a scuffle with Yıldız, Ender and Şahika and his funeral is held the next day. Yıldız marries Çağatay, whose father HasanAli becomes a partner in the company. HasanAli kicks Ender and Şahika out of the company and they become poor. During this time they help each other. Later, they join the company back, Şahika marries HasanAli and later is deservedly Cansu hired by Ender and Şahika to live with HasanAli and give them inside information about him. The season ends with a bomb blast in HasanAli's house where he is present along with Ender, Yıldız and Zehra who unfortunately dies with HasanAli.

=== Season 5 ===
Çağatay cheats on Yıldız with Kumru, a model and their neighbour. Yıldız is disheartened after she learns of this. She starts making her own shampoo and wins an award for it. At the ceremony, she publicly disgraces Çağatay and Kumru. She divorces Çağatay and marries Doğan, Kumru's father, this is a paper marriage to teach a lesson to Kumru and Çağatay. Kumru leaves Çağatay on their wedding day, thanks to Ender, when she learns he is only with her to take revenge on Doğan. Handan, Doğan's ex-wife returns and manages to win her daughter Kumru's heart and becomes a partner in the company. Kumru falls in love with Ekin, the son of Sami Onder, Doğan's enemy. Ekin has been sought out by Ender and Cagatay for his shares, in order to take down Doğan. Ekin is also hired by Handan to kill Doğan but the situation turns and the latter knocks him out and has his henchman drug him and leave him in a river as if he'd drowned. However, Cagatay saves him and they team up. The season ends with a car accident planned by Doğan to kill Çağatay in which Çağatay dies.

=== Season 6 ===
Yıldız, upon learning Doğan's involvement in the car accident, complained against him and he was sent to prison. The season starts with a 2-year time lapse. Doğan and Yıldız's daughter Yıldız Su is born while Doğan is still in prison. Later, he is freed and him and Ender team up against Yıldız. Zeynep returns from the United States after divorcing Alihan and being married to someone else. She then marries Engin, Handan's poor turned rich brother. Kumru falls for Doctor Selim, but he loves Ezgi not Kumru. After everything Kumru went through, Kumru is pretending that her name is Ezgi and lies about being poor because she wanted Selim to love her for being her, not because she is rich. Julia Dogan's ex lover and mistress kills Engin in attempt to kill Handan by putting a scorpion but ended up killing Engin. Julia, Dogan and Handan wants to stop Kumru & Selim's love. Kumru gets pregnant, but misunderstanding Selim's relation with Zeynep, she gets jealous and rejects his love, and she lies to everybody that Caner is the father of their child. Selim fights to regain Kumru but fails; he dies in a gun shot in a conflict with Doğan. Kumru and Caner get married. Doğan and Yıldız resolve their problems and get married.

At the end, Doğan has a heart attack and dies while playing with Yıldız Su and Halit Can Junior. Asuman, Emir and Sedai get married, and Kumru has another baby.

In the final episode, Ender and Yıldız are together and financially comfortable.

== Cast ==
=== Main ===
Actor/Actress	Role	Episodes	Description
Eda Ece	Yıldız Yılmaz/Argun/Kuyucu/Yıldırım	1-177	She is the daughter of Asuman and Mustafa. She is the mother of Halit Can and Yıldız Su. She is Zeynep's half-sister. She is the ex-wife of Halit, Çağatay and Doğan. She is İrem'e cousin.
Şevval Sam	Ender Çelebi/Argun/Taşdemir/Ekinci/Kuyucu/Yıldırım	1-177	She is Erim and Yiğit's mother. She is Caner's older sister. She is the ex-wife of Halit, Alihan, Kaya and Doğan. She is Çağatay's former fake fiancée. She is the former stepmother of Lila, Zehra, Halit Can, Kumru and Yildiz Su.
Biran Damla Yılmaz	Kumru Yıldırım/Kuyucu/Önder/Çelebi	111-177	She is the daughter of Doğan and Handan. She is Yıldız Su's older sister. She is Caner's wife. She is Ender's sister-in-law. She is the ex-wife of Çağatay and Ekin.
Murat Aygen	Doğan Yıldırım	111-177	He is the father of Kumru and Yıldız Su. He is the ex-husband of Handan, Ender, and Yıldız. He is Caner's father-in-law. He is the former father-in-law of Çağatay and Ekin.
Sevda Erginci	Zeynep Yılmaz/Taşdemir/Kılıç/Gündüz	1-46,150-177	
Şebnem Dönmez	Handan Kılıç/Yıldırım	134-177	
Berk Oktay	Çağatay Kuyucu	86-146	
Barış Kılıç	Kaya Ekinci	37-85, 106-110	
Nesrin Cavadzade	Şahika Ekinci/Kiliç/Kuyucu	44-108	
Talat Bulut	Halit Argun	1-85	
Onur Tuna	Alihan Taşdemir	1-46	

=== Supporting ===
Actor/Actress	Role	Episodes	Description
Vildan Vatansever	Aysel Rüstem	1-177	
Barış Aytaç	Caner Çelebi	2-177	
Serkan Rutkay Ayıköz	Emir Yüksel	3-177	
Melisa Doğu	Asuman Yılmaz	8-177	
Bahtiyar Memili	Sedai Yıldırım	86-177	
Sonat Tokuç	Cemal	134-177	
Emir Kaan Özkan	Halit Can Argun/Kuyucu 2	147-177	
Güneş Ünlü	Yıldız Su Yıldırım	147-177	
Utku Ateş	Ata Gündüz	166-177	

=== Departed characters ===
Actor/Actress	Role	Episodes	Description
Nehir Erdoğan	Julia Moran	161-175	
Sarp Ikiler	Aslan	163-172	
Emre Kızılırmak	Selim Avcıoğlu	155-171	
Elif Yılmaz	Tuğçe	161-171	
Neriman Uğur	Sevim Avcıoğlu	162-167	
Murat Onuk	Koray Avcıoğlu	162-166	
Bekir Aksoy	Engin Kılıç	147-166	
Pelin Orhuner	Selen Yıldırım	162-163	
Ece Özdikici	Hilal Altınyüz	147-155	
Kenan Acar	Altay Güven	147-153	
Ali Yasin Özegemen	Tarcan	147-152	
Can Ceylan	Murat	141-148	
Sena Yıldız	Gamze	131-146	
Ceyhun Mengiroğlu	Ekin Önder	130-146	
Kuzey Gezer	Halit Can Argun/	51-146	
Soydan Soydaş	Feedo	141-144	
Erdal Bilingen	Çetin Hilal	111-141	
Cansel Elçin	Cenk Akın	138-140	
Ece Irtem	Meriç Kırgız	129-135	
Emre Dinler	Ömer Kurtoğlu	102-133	
Nihan Aypolat	Arzu Kip	115-128	
Ece Dizdar	Feyza Üstündağ	110-128	
Gökhan Civan	Sami Önder	125-128	
Yasmin Erbil	Canan Baskıcı	111-120	
Hayati Akbaş	Hayati	93-110	
Gülenay Kalkan Ünlüoğlu	Feride Taşkın	86-110	
Erdal Özyağcılar	Hasan Ali Kuyucu	86-110	
Gamze Atay	Güler	86-110	
Şafak Pekdemir	Zehra Argun	1-110	
Nilperi Şahinkaya	Cansu Yıldırım	93-108	
Selin Uzal	Diana	105-107	
Mert Altınışık	Mahmut Haznedar	86-102	
Can Nergis	Mert Kara	74-100	
Mehmet Pamukçu	Sıtkı	1-92	
Ahmet Haktan Zavlak	Erim Argun 2	75-86	
Buçe Buse Kahraman	Lila Argun 2	48-86	
Gökhan Alkan	Kerim İncesu	72-85	
Doğaç Yıldız	Yiğit Ekinci	42-85	
Talat Bulut	Halit Argun	1-85	
İlber Kaboğlu	Erim Argun 1	1-74	
Mertkan Arat	Akın	49-74	
Hakan Karahan	Nadir Kılıç	57-71	
Tuvana Türkay	Ayşe/Leyla Çelebi	49-70	
Nilgün Türksever	Zerrin Taşdemir	1-46, 64-67	
Cavit Çetin Güler	Hilmi	54-56	
Ege Kokenli	Yağmur	45-47	
Ayşegül Çınar	Lila Argun 1	1-47	
Ahmet Kayakesen	Hakan Kurtuluş 2	13-46	
Erdem Kaynarca	Dündar Çelikkan	27-40	
Tolga Sala	Kurban	27-40	
Sarp Can Köroğlu	Atakan Kemal Karaca	15-37	
Zeynep Bastık	İrem Yılmaz	23-33	
Ebru Şahin	Hira Bozok	14-23	
Gün Akıncı	Cem Uzun	10-21	
Yeliz Şar	Defne	14-19	
Kıvanç Kasabalı	Sinan Saygın	1-14	
İrem Kahyaoğlu	Şengül Doğan	1-14	
Tuğçe Koçak	Lal Uzun	1-13	
Sinan Eroğlu	Hakan Kurtuluş 1	1-12	

== Broadcast schedule ==
Season no.	Airing day and time	Season premiere	Season finale	No. of episodes	Episode range	Year	Network
Season 1	Monday 20:00	19 March 2018	4 June 2018	12	1-12	2018	Fox
Season 2	Monday 20:00	10 September 2018	27 May 2019	35	13-47	2018-2019	Fox
Season 3	Monday 20:00	9 September 2019	23 March 2020	27	48-74	2019-2020	Fox
Season 4	Monday 20:00	7 September 2020	10 May 2021	36	75-110	2020-2021	Fox
Season 5	Monday 20:00	13 September 2021	13 June 2022	36	111-146	2021-2022	Fox
Season 6	Monday 20:00	19 September 2022	5 June 2023	31	147-177	2022-2023	Fox

== International Release ==
The series was broadcast in arabic on : OSN Yahala Al Oula, OSN TV Yahala Bil Arabi, MTV (Lebanon), and Zee Alwan dubbed by Sama Art International
