= Şevval Sam =

Turkish singer and actress

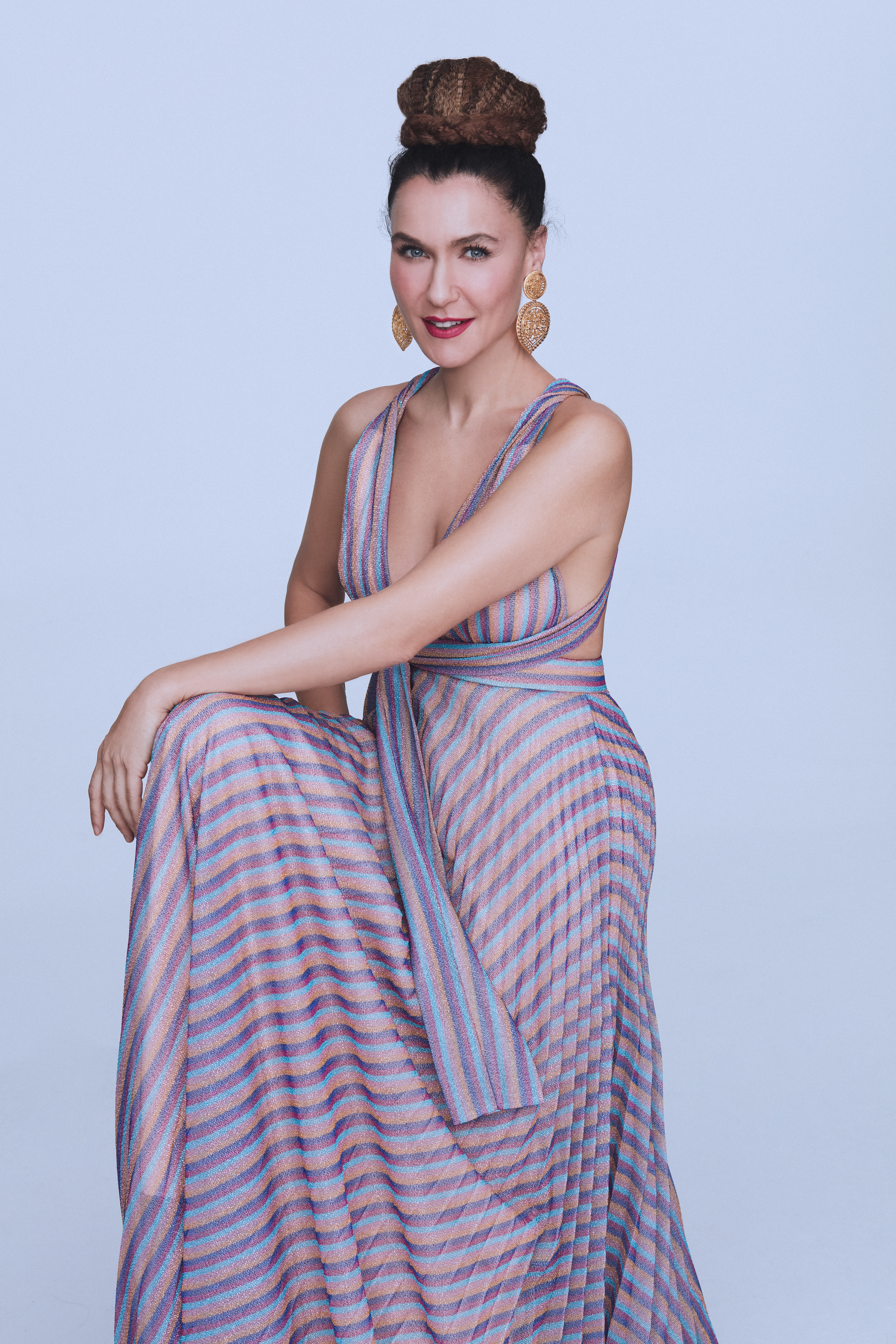
- Born: Türkdeniz Şevval Sam; 11 November 1972 (age 53); Istanbul, Turkey
- Occupations: Actress, singer, songwriter
- Years active: 1993–present
- Spouse: Metin Tekin (m. 1993; div. 1999)
- Partner: Sarp Maden (2008–present)
- Children: Taro Emir Tekin
- Parent(s): Selim Sam; Leman Sam

Türkdeniz Şevval Sam (Turkish pronunciation: [ʃevˈvaɫ ˈsam]; born 11 November 1973) is a Turkish singer and actress. She is the daughter of Leman Sam, who is also a singer. She is known for her performance on Yasak Elma as Ender, and other TV series, including Süper Baba, Gülbeyaz, Bodrum Masalı. With "Gülbeyaz", Siyah Beyaz's Nejat İşler and Yasak Elma's co-star Murat Aygen, she played together in youth series "Bodrum Masalı" again.

== Biography ==
Şevval Sam was born on 11 November 1973 in Istanbul to singer Leman Sam and musician Selim Sam. She is of Arab and Albanian descent. She has an elder sister named Şehnaz.

Şevval Sam went to high school in İsov Yapı Vocational High School and studied Fine Arts in the Graphic Design Department at Marmara University. She was married to footballer Metin Tekin between 1993 and 1999, and has a son, actor Taro Emir from this marriage.

== Filmography ==
Film
Year	Title	Role	Notes
2002	Martılar ve İstanbul	Doktor Pınar	
2007	Yaşamın Kıyısında		
2010	Yüreğine Sor		
2010	Siyah Beyaz	Ayten	
2015	Black Horse Memories	Nurse	Iranian-Turkish film
2018	Paranın Kokusu		
2022	Gönül	Sefure	
2025	Yan Yana	Şeyda	

Television
Year	Title	Role
1993–1997	Süper Baba	Deniz / Derya
1996	Feride	Feride
1999–2000	Aşkın Dağlarda Gezer	Kajal
2002	Yıldızların Altında	Türkan
2002	Karaoğlan	Ece Hatun
2002–2003	Gülbeyaz	Gülbeyaz Dursunoğlu
2004	Müjgan Bey	Müjgan / Müjdat
2004–2005	Çocuğun Var Derdin Var	Zeynep
2005–2006	Yine de Aşığım	Ayşe
2006	Yaşanmış Şehir Hikayeleri	Ece Yıldız
2008	Derman	Derman Özersoy
2012	Acayip Hikayeler	Müge (guest)
2013	Muhteşem Yüzyıl	Şarkıcı (guest)
2015	Kara Kutu	Adalet (guest)
2016–2017	Bodrum Masalı	Yıldız Ergüven
2018–2023	Yasak Elma	Ender Çelebi
2024	Yan Oda	Sevgi Ersoy
2024–	RU	Aylin
2026	Tuzlu Kahve	Candan Aydınoğlu

Short Film
Year	Title	Role	Notes
2004	Ziyaret		
2007	Sen Olmak		
2010	Kafe		

TV programs
Year	Title	Notes	Network
1994–1996	Müzik Ekspresi	music program	TRT1, TRT2, TRT3
2001–2003	Damak Tadı	cooking program	TRT1
2005–2006	Sanata Dair		TV8
2006–2008	Sanatla 30 Dakika	sequel to Sanata Dair	TV8
2011–?	Şevval Sam'la Pazar'e'rtesi	talk show	TRT Müzik
2022	Şarkılar Bizi Söyler	music program	Kanal D
2025	Yetenek Sizsiniz Türkiye	competition program	NOW

== Theatre ==
Theatre
Year	Title	Role
2018	Müzeyyen	

== Discography ==
Album
Year	Title
2006	Sek
2007	Istanbul's Secrets
2008	Karadeniz
2010	Has Arabesk
2012	II Tek
2012	Tango
2015	Toprak Kokusu
2016	Nanninom
2022	Karadeniz II

Singles
Year	Title	Notes
2017	Aşk Olsun	
2019	Dinmiyor	with Nejat Özgür
2021	Sen Bu Yaylaları	
2021	Kopsun Bir Fırtına	
2021	Karşıya Meşe Yanar	
2021	Hayat Devam Ediyi	

As featured artist
Year	Album	Notes
2009	Güldünya Şarkıları	As a part of a campaign against domestic violence, she voiced the song "Kibritçi Kız".
2010	7 Kocalı Hürmüz	Voiced the songs "Bu Gece Lazım" and "Yalnız Kullar" for the movie 7 Kocalı Hürmüz
2019	Fikret Şeneş Şarkıları	Voiced the song "Sensiz Yıllarda"
