= Öykü Karayel =

Turkish actress (born 1990)

- Born: 21 August 1990 (age 36); Istanbul, Turkey
- Education: Çemberlitaş Girls High School
- Alma mater: Istanbul University State Conservatory
- Occupation: Actress
- Years active: 2005–present
- Spouse: Can Bonomo (m. 2018)
- Children: 1

Öykü Karayel (born 21 August 1990) is a Turkish actress.

== Life and career ==
Born in 1990 in Istanbul, Öykü Karayel graduated from Çemberlitaş Girls High School. She has a twin sister. After receiving a short period of training at Kenter Theater, she entered the Theater Department of the State Conservatory of Istanbul University in 2007. While she was still a conservatory student she played the lead character of Ayşe in the theatre Güzel Şeyler Bizim Tarafta. Her performance in a play at Theatre Krek was drawn to the attention of the screenwriter Ece Yörenç. At the time he was searching a new actor for the TV series Kuzey Güney to play the character Cemre and she was chosen for it. At the end of June 2017 she started acting in a TV series called Kalp Atışı playing the role of Eylül Erdem.

== Filmography ==
=== Film ===
Year	Film	Role	Note	Genre
2015	Bulantı	Aslı	Movie	Drama
2015	Toz	Azra Naziri	Movie	Period
2017	İşe Yarar Bir Şey	Canan	Movie	Drama
2018	Put Şeylere	Elif	Movie	Fantasy
2021	Dijital Sahne: Martı	Nina	Short Theatre	Period
2025	Umami Kaynama Noktası	Melis	Film	

=== Series ===
Year	Series	Role	Note	Genre
2008	Beni Unutma	Aygül		Family
2011–2013	Kuzey Güney	Cemre Çayak	Leading Role	Drama
2014–2015	Kara Para Aşk	İpek	Joined	Drama
2016	Muhteşem Yüzyıl: Kösem	Dilruba Sultan	Joined	Historical
2017–2018	Kalp Atışı	Doctor Eylül Erdem	Leading Role	Medical Drama
2018–2019	Muhteşem İkili	Yağmur Bulut	Leading Role	Police
2019	Jet Sosyete	Sinem	Guest	Comedy
2020	Bir Başkadır	Meryem	Leading role	Drama
2021–2022	Kaderimin Oyunu	Asiye Yılmaz	Leading role	Drama
2023	Kin	Nuray Batuk	Supporting role	Irish Crime Drama
2023–	Arak/Kara	Zeynep Çınar	Leading role	Drama

== Theatre ==
Year	Title	Role	Notes
2010	Güzel Şeyler Bizim Tarafta	Ayşe	(writer: Berkun Oya)
2014	Killer Joe	Dottie Smith	(writer: Tracy Letts) tiyatro.iN
2019	Terk	Client	(writer: Milay Ezengin) Dasdas Theatre

== Awards ==
Awards
Year	Award	Category	Result
2011	16. Sadri Alışık Cinema and Theater Awards	Efes Special Award	Won
2011	Theater Critics Association	Young Talent Award	Won
2014	Haydarpaşa High School	Best Actress	Won
2014	Gecce.com Awards	The Most Beautiful Turkish Actress	Nominated
2015	19. Sadri Alışık Cinema and Theater Awards	Best Actress	Won
2016	53rd Anatalya International Film Festival	Best Actress	Won
2017	86th Izmir International Film Festival	Best Actress	Won
2017	Malatya International Film Festival	Best Actress	Won
2017	Shanghai International Film Festival	Best Actress	Won
2017	5th Bosphorus Sinema International	Best Actress	Won
2017	Pantene Altın Kelebek	Best Couple with Gökhan Alkan	Won
2017	Kristal Ekran Awards	Best Actress	Won
2017	Marie Claire Magazine	Best Couple with Gökhan Alkan	Won
2017	Turkey Youth Awards	Best Actress	Won
2017	20th Hürriyet Awards	Best Couple with Gökhan Alkan	Won
2017	KTÜ Media Awards	Best Actress	Won
2017	Academy Quality Awards	Best Actress	Won
2017	Televizyon Dizisi.com Awards	Best Actress	Won
2017	ShowTV Yılının Awards	Best Actress	Won
2018	KTÜ Media Awards	Best Actress	Won
2018	Sadri Alisik Awards	Best Actress	Won
2018	Elazığ Sinema Awards	Best Actress	Won
2018	Flying Broom International Film Festival	Best Actress	Won
