= Taro Emir Tekin =

Turkish actor

- Born: Tarık Emir Tekin; 15 June 1997 (age 29); Istanbul, Turkey
- Education: Oxford School of Drama
- Occupation: Actor
- Years active: 2020–present
- Height: 1.80 m (5 ft 11 in)
- Parents: Metin Tekin; Şevval Sam
- Relatives: Leman Sam (maternal grandmother)
- Awards: 48th Golden Butterfly Awards – Shining Star (2022)

Tarık "Taro" Emir Tekin (born 15 June 1997) is a Turkish actor, known for his roles in the TV series Sadakatsiz and Bir Peri Masalı. He studied drama at the Oxford School of Drama. Tekin is the son of actress Şevval Sam and retired footballer Metin Tekin. His grandmother is singer Leman Sam.

== Life and career ==
Tarık "Taro" Emir Tekin was born on 15 June 1997 in Istanbul to actress Şevval Sam and footballer Metin Tekin. After showing an interest in acting at an early age, Tekin attended the Cambridge School of Visual & Performing Arts and continued his studies at University of the Arts London. He then took courses in acting at the Royal Academy of Dramatic Art and studied at the Oxford School of Drama. After living in England for a period of time, he returned to Turkey where he started his acting career. He made his acting debut in 2020 with a role on Netflix's historical docudrama Rise of Empires: Ottoman and later appeared on BluTV's streaming series Çıplak as Bulut. In the same year he rose to prominence after appearing on Kanal D's series Sadakatsiz, in which he portrayed the character of Selçuk Dağcı. In 2022, he appeared in a leading role in the series Bir Peri Masalı, playing the role of Onur Köksal.

Besides acting, Tekin is also interested in music as an amateur.

== Filmography ==
Television
Year	Title	Role	Notes
2020–2022	Sadakatsiz	Selçuk Dağcı	Supporting role
2022	Bir Peri Masalı	Onur Köksal	Leading role
2023–2024	Yalı Çapkını	Kaya Korhan	Supporting role
2026–	Aynı Yağmur Altında	Koray Karanoğlu	Supporting role
Streaming series
Year	Title	Role	Notes
2020	Rise of Empires: Ottoman	Mehmed	Supporting role
2020–2021	Çıplak	Bulut	Supporting role
Film
Year	Title	Role	Notes
2021	Akis	Raven	Supporting role

== Awards ==
Awards
Year	Award	Category	Result	Ref.
2022	48th Golden Butterfly Awards	Shining Star	Won	
