= Tarzan of Manisa (film) =

1994 film

- Directed by: Orhan Oğuz
- Written by: Nuray Oguz
- Starring: Talat Bulut
- Release date: 1994
- Running time: 101 minutes
- Country: Turkey
- Language: Turkish

Tarzan of Manisa (Turkish: Manisa Tarzanı) is a 1994 Turkish biographical drama film about Ahmet bin Carlak, also known as the "Tarzan of Manisa" 1899–1963, directed by Orhan Oğuz. The film was selected as the Turkish entry for the Best Foreign Language Film at the 67th Academy Awards, but was not accepted as a nominee.

== Cast ==
- Talat Bulut as Ahmet Bedevi 'Tarzan of Manisa'
- Serap Saglar
- Pinar Afsar
- Ayton Sert
- Kutay Köktürk
- Özlem Savas
- Nihat Nikerel

== See also ==
- List of submissions to the 67th Academy Awards for Best Foreign Language Film
- List of Turkish submissions for the Academy Award for Best Foreign Language Film
