= Tarzan of Manisa =

Turkish environmentalist

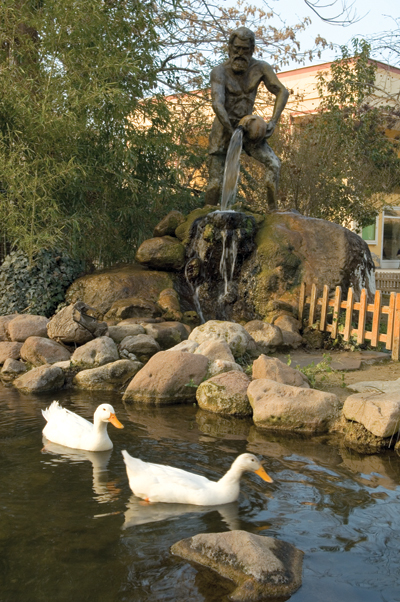
Tarzan Heykeli ("the statue of Tarzan"), statue of Ahmet Bedevi in Manisa

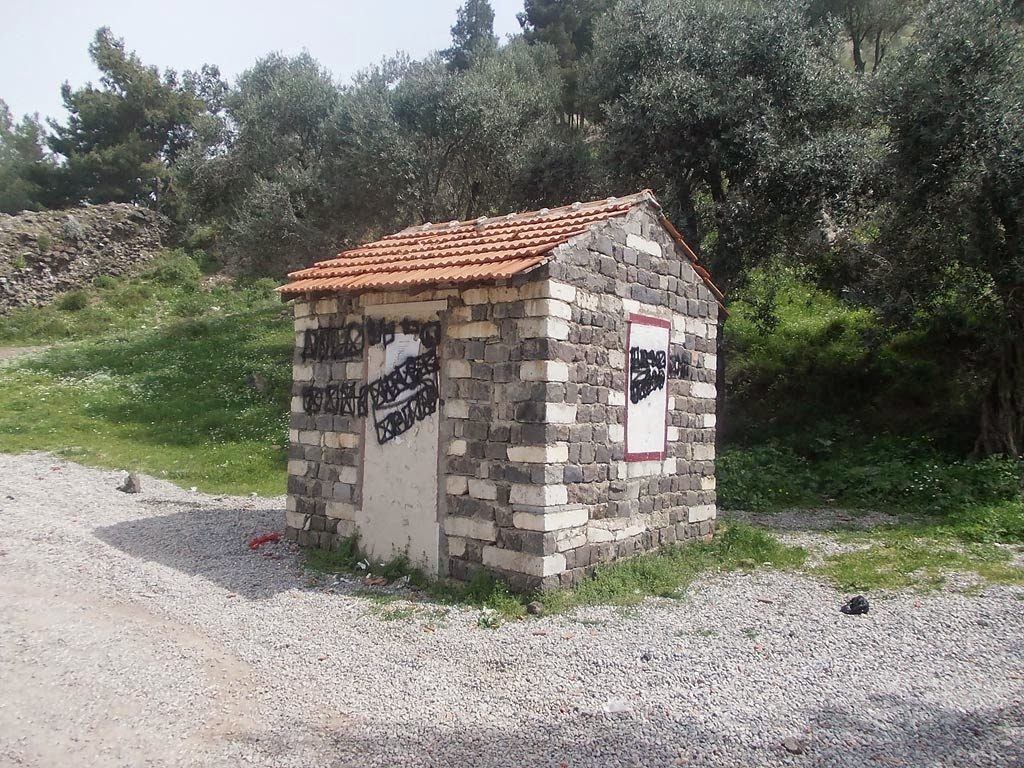
The Topkale ("Gun's castle") the hut on Mount Sipylus where Bedevi lived for 40 years

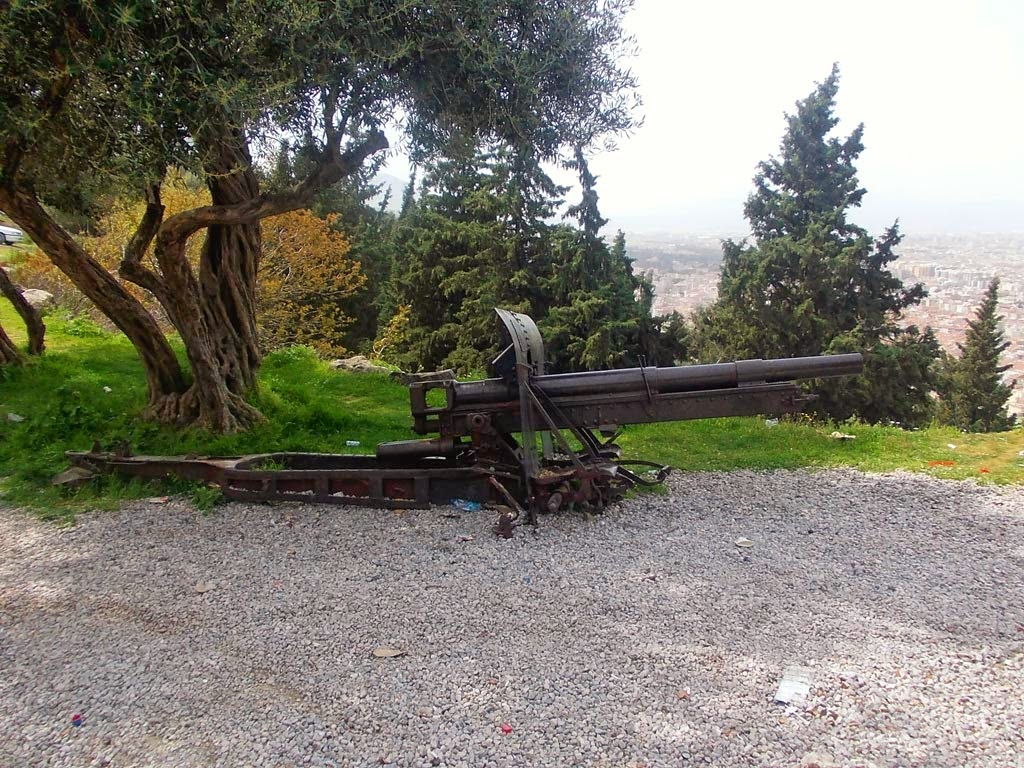
The old cannon which Bedevi fired daily to signal midday

Tarzan of Manisa (Turkish: Manisa Tarzanı) is a pseudonym of Ahmet bin Carlak (1899, Samarra, Ottoman Empire – 31 May 1963, Manisa, Turkey), a Turkish environmentalist who lived on Mount Sipylus near Manisa, in western Turkey, for 40 years. He is considered the first environmentalist in Turkey, and received his nickname because of his skimpy clothing and his life in contact with nature. Carlak called himself "Ahmet Bedevi" ("the bedouin Ahmet").

== Biography ==
Carlak was born in 1899. Depending on the sources, his hometown is reported as Baghdad or Samarra. His family was of Iraqi Turkmen descent, originally from Kirkuk, Iraq. In his early teens, he met Meral, the daughter of Sheikh Tahir, a Turkmen tribal leader, and got engaged to her. Just before the wedding, World War I broke out and Carlak had to leave her. His activity during the war is unknown, but at the end he was in India, where he lived for some time in the jungle. While in Iran, he found out accidentally that the family of his fiancée had moved nearby. While planning his wedding again, he read in a newspaper that in Turkey the struggle for independence had begun. Deciding to join the insurgents, both tried to reach Anatolia. As they passed through a steep-sided gorge, his fiancée slipped, fell down a cliff and was killed. Carlak then reached the insurgents, serving under Kâzım Karabekir in the eastern front of the Turkish War of Independence. Then Carlak fought in Antep and Kilis, and belonged to one of the formations that recaptured Smyrna from the Greeks. He was wounded in the war and for his courage he received the Medal of Independence with red ribbon. Immediately after the war, Carlak settled in Manisa, which had been devastated by a fire caused by the retreating Greek army during the Greco-Turkish War. Struck by the consequences of the fire, Carlak made it his life's goal to reforest the region, single-handedly planting and cultivating innumerable trees on Mount Sipylus.

Carlak was noted for his appearance. He ceased trimming his beard in 1924, and started to become known as Hacı ("the pilgrim"). He began to dress only in a pair of shorts, with a naked torso, and lived alone for 40 years in a hut, which he called Topkale ("castle of the cannon"), named for an old cannon which he used every day to signal midday by firing a shot; because of that, the adjective topçu ("artillerist") was added to his nickname "pilgrim". Inside the hut, Carlak slept on a plank covered with old newspapers, washing himself in summer and winter with cold water. At that time he adopted the name of Ahmet Bedevi ("the Bedouin Ahmet"), although it is possible that it was the people of Manisa who called him that. Carlak learned to write the new Turkish alphabet in Latin characters at one of the Halk Mektepleri ("school of the people", a primary school for adults established by Atatürk), and started to take part in public life.

He regularly visited the city, where he stayed at Dede Niyazi's lokanta. In exchange, Carlak brought a jar of water from the mountain to the restaurant. Sometimes he worked as an auxiliary (firefighter or gardener) for the city administration. In 1933 he may have been hired on the monthly salary of 30 Turkish liras as an assistant gardener.

In 1934, following the showing of the movie The Revenge of Tarzan at the cinemas of Manisa, Carlak was nicknamed Manisa Tarzanı (Tarzan of Manisa). Bearded and bare-chested, Carlak took part in the official victory parades commemorating the revolutionary war, wearing his medal placed on a leaf of an ornamental palm tree that he had tied around his neck.

Carlak was also a mountaineer. Together with members of the local mountaineering club, he climbed Mount Ararat, Cilo Dağı (1957), Aladağlar and Demirkazık Dağı (1959). In 1959, he was a guest in Konya and Niğde with members of the Manisa Alpine Club. His presence attracted tens of thousands of spectators. In Konya, he was initially denied entry to the Mevlana Museum because of his naked torso. At that point, he pointed to Mevlana's inscription above the door, which said, "Come to me, whatever you are!" and went in.

Carlak never married: however, he allegedly received many love letters over the years which were lost after his death.

== Death ==
Carlak died on May 31, 1963, at the Manisa State Hospital of heart failure. On 1 June 1963, Hürriyet reported on his death with the article "The Tarzan of Manisa is dead". Carlak was buried in the new cemetery ("Asrî Mezarlık") of Manisa, despite his last wish, that he be buried at Topkale.

== Legacy ==
The city of Manisa continues to pay tribute to Carlak. The environment week in the Aegean city has been named "Manisa Tarzanı Çevre Günleri Haftası". On this occasion, the municipal administration awards the "Tarzan awards". Furthermore, the city has named an elementary school (the "Manisa Tarzanı Ahmet Bedevi İlkokulu") and a boulevard ("Tarzan Bulvarı") named in Carlak's honour. In 2012, a solar energy car developed by students from Celal Bayar University of Manisa was named Manisa Tarzanı .

In the Fatih Parkı of Manisa, a life-size monument representing Carlak has been erected, known as Tarzan Heykeli. Each year, the authorities of Manisa commemorate him on the anniversary of his death, honoring him as a precursor of Turkish environmentalism. In sports, fans of Manisaspor call themselves Tarzanlar ("Tarzans") and, in 2015, a local cross-country skiing event was named Manisa Tarzanı.

Carlak's life has been the subject of several books, and of a 1994 film shot by director Orhan Oğuz entitled Manisa Tarzanı. The film is considered the first Turkish film with an ecological subject, and was submitted by Turkey for the Academy Award for Best Foreign Language Film, although later it did not reach the nomination.

== Sources ==
- Sunay Akın (2005). Onlar Hep Oradaydı (in Turkish). Istanbul: Türkiye İş Bankası Kültür Yayınları.
- Bedriye Aksakal (1993). Yeşilin Atası Manisa Tarzanı (in Turkish).
- "Manisa Tarzanı Ahmet Bedevi Biyografisi". biyografi.info (in Turkish).
