= İlişki Durumu: Karışık =

- Genre: Romantic, Comedy
- Written by: Banu Kiremitçi Bozkurt
- Directed by: Bülent İşbilen
- Starring: Seren Şirince; Berk Oktay; Eda Ece; Pamir Pekin; Nurseli İdiz; Sezai Altekin; Alptekin Serdengeçti; Mert Türkoğlu; Özlem Öçalmaz
- Theme music composer: Aria
- Composer: Oya Küçümen
- Country of origin: Turkey
- Original language: Turkish
- No. of seasons: 1
- No. of episodes: 40

Production
- Producer: Faruk Bayhan
- Cinematography: İlkay Işık
- Editor: Engin Öztürk
- Camera setup: Single-camera
- Running time: 100 min
- Production company: MF Yapım

Original release
- Network: Show TV
- Release: 4 July 2015 – 27 April 2016

İlişki Durumu: Karışık is a Turkish remake of Full House. The Turkish romantic comedy television series first aired on Show TV on July 4, 2015. The series, created by Banu Kiremitçi Bozkurt, is about love, jealousy, pride, and a love game that goes hand in hand with friendship and misunderstandings. İlişki Durumu: Evli is a total of 4 episodes continuing İlişki Durumu: Karışık.

== Plot ==
Aysegul (Seren Şirince) is a young girl who lives with her pet cat Minak. Aysegul aspires to be a writer. Her friends trick her into going on a vacation where she meets the famous actor Can Tekin (Berk Oktay) and accidentally vomits on him. She tries her best to apologize but Can is way too angry at her. Meanwhile, her friends, Ece and Efe sell her house. Aysegul returns to find out she is homeless. With no other option, she decides to go to her former house and request the new owner to let her stay there. It is revealed that the new owner of the house is Can Tiken. After a series of fights, Can finally allows her to stay till she finds shelter but for that, she has to do all the house chores for Can. Can is in love with his beautiful fashion designer friend Elif (Eda Ece) but Elif is in love with Murat. Can, Murat and Elif are childhood friends.

A huge party is thrown to which celebrities such as Can Tiken are invited. Aysegul also goes there as she wants to find a producer/director who can accept her script and make her a writer so that she can earn money. Can gets angry at Aysegul's appearance there. At the party, Elif confesses to Murat that she loves him but Murat does not return her feelings and instead tells her that Can is in love with her. Engraged, Elif goes to Can in front of the media and says blames him for being the reason why Murat rejected her. Can replies that he is in love with Ayseguk and the two are going to get married. This leaves everyone, including Aysegul herself, shocked. At their house, Can makes a deal with Aysegul. Aysegul has to marry Can for six months and do all the house chores and after the end of those months, they will get divorced and Aysegul will get her house. Aysegul agrees to sign the contradiction. Another condition of the contract is to keep this deal a secret.

Can Tiken's mother Mediha meets Aysegul and is devastated by Aysegul's lack of proper manners and her incomplete education. Can's father is Dr. Tahsin Tiken, who is a very busy man. Ismail Tiken, Can's grandfather, wholeheartedly welcomes Aysegul to the family and quickly befriends her. He even wants Aysegul and Can to live in his house though Can wants to live in a separate house because of his differences with his father, Tahsin. Aysegul and Can get married. Seeing this, although Elif loves Murat, she starts feeling jealous of Aysegul and begins to spend more time with Can. Meanwhile, Murat tells Aysegul that despite her scripts are horrible, he can help her improve her writing and gives her a job. Aysegul finds a hard time completing the household chores as she wants to do only one thing; writing. Meanwhile, Aysegul falls in love with Can while Murat falls in love with Aysegul due to her innocence. When Can discovers Murat loves Aysegul he feels jealous. Later Can also falls in love with Aysegul. Ayşegul's friend Efe becomes Can's best friend and supporter. One day Ayşegul goes to Can and tells her that she wants a divorce from him and that she loves him. Can tries a lot to stop the divorce he finally gives up. After the heartbreak, Can decides to re-win Ayşegul and he, with the help of Efe, wins Ayşegul back and the two decide to get married.

On the day of their wedding, Elif lies to Can about being pregnant. Because of this, Can is forced to leave Ayşegul at the wedding table, leaving her heartbroken and depressed. Ece tries to bring Murat to Ayşegul's life whereas Efe still supports Can. Ece and Efe, who are expecting their first child, ask Ayşegul and Can to take care of their child if anything happens to them. Ece and Efe die in a car accident, leaving Ayşegul and Can to take care of their newborn child. Because of the child, Ayşegul and Can come close again but Can has to marry Elif. They name Efe and Ece's baby Ismail, after Can's grandfather and nickname the baby Iso. Can marries Elif and Murat proposes to Aysegul and she accepts his proposal. Aysegul takes Iso for vaccination where she meets Can. Aysegul goes to drink water when she sees Madiha and Niazi. Madiha is talking about Elif's fake pregnancy. Madiha suddenly realizes that Aysegul was listening to everything and runs behind her. She pushes her and knocks her to the ground. Can helps Aysegul to stand on her feet back. Meanwhile, they learn that Aysegul has lost a part of her memory and thinks that she is going to marry Can. Can takes advantage of this situation and starts to spend a lot of time with her. Iso meanwhile starts to live with Can. After a twisting turn, Aysegul gets her memory back and kicks Can out of her house and reunites with Murat. Aysegul starts to focus on her novel and Murats spends a lot of time with her which is not bearable for Can. Can heirs Handan make them separate. Aysegul learns of Elif's feigned pregnancy and threatens her that she will tell this to Can. Elif and Madiha trap Aysegul in their plan and show that Aysegul pushed Elif and due to this Elif lost her child. Can and Ismail discover the truth. Can gives Elif a divorce when he went to talk with her he overhears Elif threatening Murat that if he does not help her stay with Can she will tell Aysegul that Murat was in the fake pregnancy, so he decides to meet with Can to tell the truth he keeps it in a video to show Aysegul but on the other hand Aysegul's and Murat's marriage ceremony is going on when Can enters and destroys everything by kidnapping Aysegul and telling her the truth that Murat has been hiding from her, after listening to the tape she calls Murat and breaks up with him. Can then tries to make things better with Aysegul, but Aysegul refuses because Can is still married to Elif. On paper he then tells her that he will end his marriage as soon as possible. Elif tells Can that she will divorce him if he gives her Aysegul's house. He refuses and Aysegul goes to Elif's house and tells her that she doesn't care if she has the house. Elif then takes her stuff and goes to Aysegul's house and stays in it. A few days later Aysegul left the house and wrote a letter to Can that she will never come back again. She has a new job as a waitress, and she got a new small apartment.

== International broadcast ==
Country	Network	Local Title	Series premiere
Indonesia	SCTV	Status Palsu	February 2016
Romania	Acasa TV	Stadiul relației: complicat	September 2016
Arab League	MBC4	زواج مصلحة	July 2017
Pakistan	Urdu 1	میں عائشہ گل	12 August 2017 - 6 May 2018
Afghanistan	1TV	Relationship Status	August 2017
India	ZEE5	Relationship status: It's complicated	Last streamed on 31 Dec 2020
Slovenia	Planet TV	Status: Zapleteno	2019
Malaysia	TV2	Relationship: It's Complicated	March 2020
Vietnam	VTV1	Ngôi nhà hạnh phúc	15 July 2022 – 27 October 2022
Bulgaria	bTV Story	Състояние на връзката: Сложно е	25 December 2023–present
Lebanon	LBCI	وجعة راس	
Egypt	Mix One	زواج مصلحة	July 2024

== Cast ==
Role	Actor
Ayşegül Dinç	Seren Şirince
Can Tekin	Berk Oktay
Elif Güvener	Eda Ece
Murat Soykan	Pamir Pekin
Mediha Tekin	Nurseli İdiz
İsmail Tekin	Sezai Altekin
Tahsin Tekin	Alptekin Serdengeçti
Efe Şengün	Mert Türkoğlu
Ece Şengün	Özlem Öçalmaz

== Series overview ==
Season	No. of Episodes	Start of the Season	End of the Season	Episodes	TV Season	TV Channel
1	40	4 July 2015	27 April 2016	1 - 40	2016	Show TV
