= Leman Sam =

Turkish singer and songwriter (born 1951)

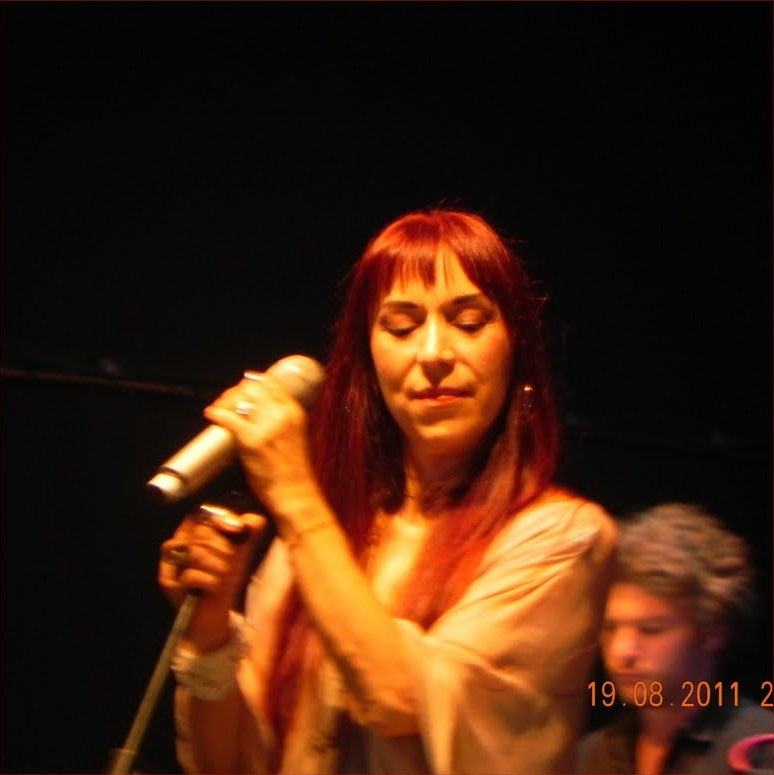
- Sam at concert in August 2011

Background information
- Born: Emine Leman Senkan; 22 February 1951 (age 75); Üsküdar, Istanbul, Turkey
- Genres: Folk, pop
- Occupation: Singer
- Years active: 1988–present
- Website: http://www.lemansam.biz

Leman Sam (born Emine Leman Senkan; 22 February 1951) is a Turkish singer and songwriter. Her daughter Şevval Sam and her grandson Taro Emir Tekin are both actors.

== Background ==
Leman Sam's origins have been described as Rumeli. She grew up in Turkey and has received formal education in theater, singing and dance. She worked in an opera chorus for a time. She has recorded several Azeri türküs.

== Career ==
In addition to her distinctive style, she has received appreciation for her folk songs. She is also famous as an artist who can sing in multiple languages including Greek, French, and Spanish. Sam, who is not observed in the media platforms, has given concerts in many cities and countries including many diplomatic concerts.

Sam, who is sensitive to the protection of natural life and animal rights, carries out activities that raise awareness for related community. The character Tuba in Yılmaz Erdoğan's movie Vizontele Tuuba is in fact an imaginary depiction inspired by Sam's life.

== Other activities ==
Leman Sam is an environmentalist and is known for her activities in favor of human rights and animal rights. In order to support the process of achieving peace between PKK-Turkey, a democratic initiative was held in 2009 which featured a program called the "Art for Peace Initiative" consisting of 282 artists including Sam.

Sam participated in projects to raise awareness about Chernobyl disaster's effects on Turkey, and on its 23rd anniversary she gave a concert at the anti-nuclear rally in Sinop, Turkey, under the motto "Don't Forget Chernobyl, Own the Future". In 2013, on the decision of cutting of trees for construction of artillery barracks in Taksim Gezi Park, she said on her Twitter account "If the nation do not give a lesson to these people in the elections and bring them back to power, the beautiful lands of Anatolia will see their end." She dedicated the song "Ağıt" on her official Twitter account to of "All children murdered" at the protests, referring to Berkin Elvan, who died at the age of 15 after the police hit him in the head with a tear gas pod during the Gezi Park protests.

Sam criticized police officers, who attacked the protesters following the Soma mine disaster, on her Twitter saying "Customize it, cover it up, cause deaths, attack those who protest with pepper gas, and as if it's not enough, beat and kill them!". In the same year, on the Eid al-Adha she addressed the issue of slaughtering animals by Muslims on her Twitter account in Turkey "For me what ISIS does [to people] is the same as what these people do by putting blades on an innocent animal's throat."

== Discography ==
=== Albums ===
- 1988: Livaneli Şarkıları
- 1990: Çağrı
- 1992: Ayak Sesleri
- 1994: Eski Fotoğraflar
- 1998: İlla
- 2012: Nereye Kadar
