= Tolga Sala =

Turkish actor (born 1989)

Tolga Sala (born 18 July 1989) is a Turkish actor known for his role as "Hamza Alp" in Diriliş Ertuğrul.

== BİYOGRAFİ ==
Tolga Sala, who was born in Istanbul, graduated from Yeditepe University in Istanbul. He was in a relationship with Turkish actress Melisa Aslı Pamuk for a while but is currently single. The actor received training from actors like Ayla Algan, Cenk Tunalı and Mehmet Birkiye.

Tolga Sala gave life to the character of Hamza Alp in 2014, in the first season of Resurrection Ertuğrul, starring Engin Altan Düzyatan, Cengiz Coşkun and Hülya Darcan. He became more popular when he portrayed the role of Cemil in Çukur in 2017. In 2018, he appeared in Yasak Elma with the role of Kurban.

== Filmography ==
- Emanet (Ferit, 2022-2025)
- Baba (Kürsat, 2022)
- Yasak Elma (Kurban, 2018–2019)
- Çukur (Cemil, 2018)
- Kızılelma (2014)
- Diriliş: Ertuğrul (Hamza Alp, 2014–2016)
- Yer Gök Aşk (Yiğit Yeşilyurt, 2012–2013)
- Lale Devri (Yiğit Yeşilyurt, 2012–2014)
