= Talat Bulut =

Turkish actor

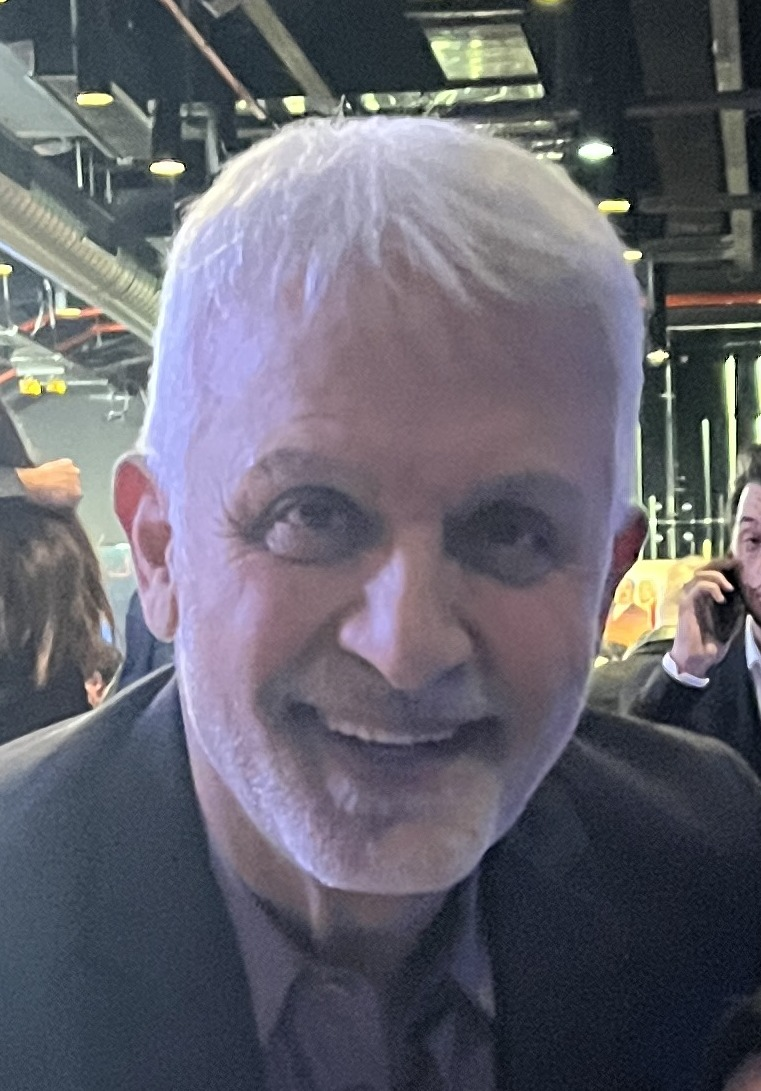
- Born: 23 March 1956 (age 70); Sarıkamış, Turkey
- Occupation: Actor
- Years active: 1980–present
- Spouse: Pınar Afşar (m. 1987; div. 2009)
- Children: 1

Talat Bulut (born 23 March 1956) is a Turkish actor. He has appeared in more than twenty films since 1980.

== Selected filmography ==
FilmTV series
Year	Title	Role	Notes
2015	Mucize	Muallim Mahir	Leading Role
2007	Bliss	İrfan	Leading Role
2000	House of Angels		
1994	Tarzan of Manisa	Ahmet Bedevi 'Tarzan of Manisa'	Leading Role
1980	Hazal		
Year	Title	Role	Notes
2018-2020	Yasak Elma	Halit Argun	Leading role
2022	Mahkum	Señor (Efkan Dağlı)	Supporting role
2022–2023	Tuzak	Demir Gümüşay	Leading role
