= Seren Şirince =

Turkish actress

- Born: March 15, 1991 (age 35); Kaiserslautern, Germany
- Education: Bachelor's
- Occupation: Actress
- Years active: 2012–present
- Notable work: İlişki Durumu: Karışık
- Spouse: Tobias Sutters (m. 2019)

Seren Şirince born on March 15, 1991, is a Turkish actress based in Istanbul and New York.

== Life ==
She graduated from Yeditepe University in 2017, where she studied a BFA in Theatre. Her professional career began during her university education when she played the role of "Lucy" in "The Water's Edge" at the Talimhane Theater Company. Since university, Seren has starred in a number of high-profile television, film, and commercial productions, and is best known for her role as "Aysegul Dinc" in the Turkish romantic comedy series "Iliski Durumu: Karisik." Seren was awarded "Best Comedy Female Actor of the Year" at the 2017 Yeditepe University Awards.

In television, Seren is known for her starring roles as "Derya" in "Bir Aile Hikayesi," the Turkish adaptation of the US series "This is Us". In film, Seren has had leading roles in the feature film "Bucur" and the short film "Black Sun," which was awarded "The Best International Short Film" at the Locarno Film Festival. More recently, Seren played "Caprice" in the BKM theatre production "The Comedy About a Bank Robbery," directed by Lerzan Pamir. In 2021, Seren pursued further education in the Hagen Core program at HB Studio and Stella Adler in New York.

== Filmography ==
Year	Title	Role	Notes
2012	Araf Zamanı	-	Recurring role, TV series
2013	Aşk Emek İster	Nazlı	Supporting role, TV series
2015–2016	İlişki Durumu: Karışık	Ayşegül Dinç	Leading role, TV series
2016	İlişki Durumu: Evli	Ayşegül Dinç Tekin	Leading role, TV series
2017	Seven Ne Yapmaz	Gizem / Nazlı Ayci	Leading role, TV series
2018	Bücür	Özge	Leading role, Movie
2019	Bir Aile Hikayesi	Derya Tepeli	Supporting role, TV series

== Advertisements ==
Year	Advertising Films		
Year	Advertising Films	2014	Eti: Benim O

== Awards ==
Awards and Nominations
Year	Award	Category	Result
2016	Yeditepe University 4th Dilek Awards	Best Comedy Actress of the Year	Won
2016	Ege University 5th Media Awards	Best TV Actress	Nominated
2016	5th Fashion TV Mode Awards	Most Fashionable TV Couple (Ayşegül-Can)	Won
