= Gökhan Alkan =

Turkish actor

- Born: Gökhan Alkan; 8 December 1987 (age 38); Istanbul, Turkey
- Occupation: Actor
- Years active: 2011–present
- Website: www.gokhanalkan.org

Gökhan Alkan (born 8 December 1987) is a Turkish actor. He is multi-faceted in various fields and is trained in solfège, singing and is professionally engaged in acting, sports, voice acting, poetry and lyricism.

== Early life ==
Gökhan Alkan was born on December 8, 1987, in Istanbul, Turkey. He has an associate degree from Kocaeli University in "Teaching Automotive Technologies" and another associate degree from Anadolu University in "Foreign Trade and Marketing". He was involved in amateur theatre groups in high school and university years and gave live music performances during the same time. After studying for a year at Müjdat Gezen Art Center, he was chosen for the Müjdat Gezen Theatre as a professional actor.

Alkan received his acting and singing education at MSM Actor Studio and Müjdat Gezen Art Center. From 2010 to 2013, he acted in several plays for two seasons at Müjdat Gezen Theatre and after graduation he eventually set up his own theatre with a group of friends.

== Career ==
The first television experience of Alkan in professional terms has been with the historical series Muhteşem Yüzyıl, a project that was launched in 2011 and brought a big sound. He joined several episodes of Muhteşem Yüzyıl as a guest actor, drawing a lot of attention towards his performance and personality. As a result, he was cast for several lead roles afterward. Alkan started being recognized as a mainstream actor in Turkey with his lead role as Tarık Uygun in Kocamın Ailesi, which had a run of two seasons with 57 episodes with Beren Gökyıldız.

Following Kocamın Ailesi Alkan was cast for the lead roles in series Seviyor Sevmiyor with Zeynep Çamcı and medical series Kalp Atışı with Öykü Karayel as Yiğit Balcı and Ali Asaf Denizoğlu. He shared the lead roles with Yağmur Tanrısevsin in the romantic drama Kalp Yarası.

In 2016, Alkan played lead roles in two non-commercial films, Makas and Defne'nin Bir Mevsimi. Defne'nin Bir Mevsimi was crowned with many titles in numerous film festivals and was awarded the Best Film at the 9th Montreal Turkish Film Festival in 2017. Alkan was honored with a Special Award at 5th APAN Star Awards held in South Korea for his performance as Yiğit Balcı in Seviyor Sevmiyor, a variation of a Korean production. He was a part of the ensemble cast of Organik Aşk Hikayeleri, a feature film consisting of 8 short films. Organik Aşk Hikayeleri was nominated for 7 awards at the 2017 Madrid International Film Festival with one win, and 4 awards at the 2017 Toronto ReelHeART International Film Festival with wins Best Foreign Language Film and Best Ensemble Cast.

== Personal life ==
Alkan is diagnosed with Asperger’s syndrome and has used this condition as an advantage to concentrate and give all his energies to his work. Due to this condition Alkan has been forced to plan and schedule his life since he was diagnosed.

== Filmography ==
=== Films ===
Year	Title	Role	Notes
2016	Defne'nin Bir Mevsimi	Ferhat	Leading role
2016	Makas	Fatih Kömürcü	Leading role
2017	Organik Aşk Hikayeleri	Hasan	Ensemble cast

=== Television series ===
Year	Title	Role	Notes
2011	Muhteşem Yüzyıl	Tahmasp I	Guest actor
2013	Her Şey Yolunda Merkez	Cem Karabey	Leading role
2013–2014	Gurbette Aşk Bir Yastıkta	Osman Türkoğlu	Leading role
2014–2015	Kocamın Ailesi	Tarık Uygun/Engin Ar	Leading role
2016–2017	Seviyor Sevmiyor	Yiğit Balcı	Leading role
2017–2018	Kalp Atışı	Ali Asaf Denizoğlu	Leading role
2019	Zengin ve Yoksul	Karan Serezli	Leading role
2020	Yasak Elma	Kerim İncesu	Supporting role
2021–2022	Kalp Yarası	Ferit Sancakzade	Leading role
2023	Kraliçe	Ateş Akça	Leading role
2024	Kül Masalı	Arat Giraylı	Leading role

== Theatre ==
Year	Title	Writer	Theatre
2010–11	Mustafam Kemalim	Müjdat Gezen	Müjdat Gezen Theatre
2010–11	Gözlerimi Kaparım Vazifemi Yaparım	Haldun Taner	Müjdat Gezen Theatre
2010–11	Oscar	Claude Magnier	Müjdat Gezen Theatre
2012–13	İstanbul ve Aşk	Tarık Şerbetçioğlu	İstanbul Kumpanyası

== Awards and nominations ==
Year	Ceremony	Award	Work	Result
2016	APAN Star Awards	Special Award	Seviyor Sevmiyor	Won
2017	Golden Butterfly Awards	Best Couple (with Öykü Karayel)	Kalp Atışı	Won
2017	Marie Claire Magazine	Best Couple (with Öykü Karayel)	Kalp Atışı	Won
2017	20th Hürriyet Awards	Best Couple (with Öykü Karayel)	Kalp Atışı	Won
