= Berk Oktay =

Turkish actor (born 1982)

- Born: 28 October 1982 (age 43); Ankara, Turkey
- Occupations: Actor; model
- Years active: 2000–present
- Spouses: Merve Şarapçıoğlu (m. 2016; div. 2020) Yıldız Çağrı Atiksoy (m. 2022)
- Children: 2

Berk Oktay (born 28 October 1982) is a Turkish model and actor, known for his leading roles in series İlişki Durumu: Karışık, Benim Hala Umudum Var alongside actress Gizem Karaca and actor Şükrü Özyıldız. He appeared in other hit series such as Yasak Elma, Savaşçı, Arka Sokaklar, and Akasya Durağı. He began his acting career in Tatlı Bela Fadime alongside Nehir Erdoğan.

He had faced allegations of violence from his former wife, Merve. Their divorce was finalized in 2020. In 2022, he married Yıldız Çağrı Atiksoy who was his co-star in the military series Savaşçı.

== Filmography ==
=== Television ===
Year	Title	Role	Notes
2006-2007	Tatlı Bela Fadime	Levent	Leading role
2008–2009	Akasya Durağı	Murat Aydın	Supporting role
2009–2012	Arka Sokaklar	Sinan Bahadır	Leading role (126–250)
2010	Umut Yolcuları	Sinan Bahadır	Guest appearance
2012–2013	Alev Alev	Murat	Leading role
2013–2014	Benim Hala Umudum Var	Hakan Demirer	Leading role
2014	Aşktan Kaçılmaz	Mardinli Berzan	Leading role
2015–2016	İlişki Durumu: Karışık	Can Tekin	Leading role
2016	İlişki Durumu: Evli	Can Tekin	Leading role
2017–2020	Savaşçı	Captain Kağan Bozok	Leading role
2020–2022	Yasak Elma	Çağatay Kuyucu	Leading role
2022–2023	Bir Küçük Gün Işığı	Fırat Ayaz	Leading role

== Awards ==
Awards and nominations
Year	Award	Category	Result
2016	7th KTÜ Media Awards	Most Liked Actor	Nominated
2016	Yeditepe University 4th Dilek Awards	Best Comedy Actor of the Year	Won
2016	Ege University 5th Media Awards	Best TV Actor	Nominated
2016	MGD 22nd Golden Objective Awards	Best Romantic and Comedy TV Actor	Won
