= Murat Aygen =

Turkish actor

- Born: Murat Ağlatçı; 29 October 1971 (age 54); Diyarbakır, Turkey
- Education: Mimar Sinan Fine Arts University
- Occupation: Actor
- Years active: 1998–present
- Spouse: Nihan Aslı Elmas (m. 2010)
- Children: 1

Murat Aygen (born 29 October 1971) is a Turkish actor best known for his performance in Mucize Doktor as Doctor Tanju Korman. He is a graduate of Mimar Sinan Fine Arts University State Conservatory.

== Career ==
Murat Aygen was born in 1971 in Diyarbakır as Murat Ağlatçı. In 1992, he studied biology at Istanbul University, but changed his major to musical theatre acting at Mimar Sinan University in 1998, before getting a master's degree in opera in 2002. Between 1991 and 1995, he worked on stage at various places, including Istanbul City Theatre. In the following years he worked as a therapist, soloist, and faculty member in a number of institutions and organizations.

Aygen started his acting career in 2005, with a supporting role in the TV movie Ankara Ekspresi. He continued his career on television before making his cinematic debut with Av Mevsimi, in which he had the role of Şevket Altun. In 2008, he appeared in the Paramparça Aşklar and Kül ve Ateş TV series. In 2013, he rose to further prominence with his role as Faruk Beylice in Medcezir on Star TV. After a recurring role in İstanbullu Gelin, Aygen was cast in Mucize Doktor, an adaptation of Good Doctor, which was first broadcast in 2019.

== Filmography ==
| Year | Title | Role | Notes |
|---|---|---|---|
| 2005 | Ankara Ekspresi | Binbaşı Seyfi | TV film |
| 2008 | Paramparça Aşklar | Cem | TV series |
| 2009 | Kül ve Ateş | Doktor Hakan | TV series |
| 2010 | Av Mevsimi | Şevket Altun | Film |
| 2011 | Dedektif Memoli | Kürşat | TV series |
| 2013 | Medcezir | Faruk Beylice | TV series |
| 2015 | Maral: En Güzel Hikayem | Hakan | TV series |
| 2016 | Bodrum Masalı | Evren Ergüven | TV series |
| 2017 | İstanbullu Gelin | Can | TV series |
| 2018 | Şahin Tepesi | Demir | TV series |
| 2019–2021 | Mucize Doktor | Prof Dr Tanju Korman | TV series |
| 2021–2023 | Yasak Elma | Doğan Yıldırım | TV series |
