= Cem Tuncer =

Turkish jazz guitarist, composer

- Born: July 27, 1978 (age 48)
- Origin: Turkish
- Genre: Jazz
- Occupations: bass guitarist, composer, arranger

Cem Tuncer (born 27 July 1978) is a bass guitarist, composer, arranger and producer. He was born in Germany but moved to London, England where he has had his career. He began playing bass guitar at the age of 21. In 2004, he started playing jazz. He has taken part mainly in jazz festivals such as Betone and Tribass, which are both band projects. He has released his own album Buddha’s Groove. In 2009, he established drum and bass workshops in Turkish universities. He has composed many original songs for short films and documentaries. He also produces music for commercials and promotion films and sound design for performances and movies.
