= Fırat =

Fırat may refer to:

- Fırat (surname), a surname (including a list of people with the name)
- Fırat River
- Fırat University, Elazığ, Turkey

== People with the given name ==
- Fırat Akkoyun (born 1982), Turkish footballer
- Firat Arslan (born 1970), German boxer
- Fırat Aydınus (born 1973), Turkish football referee
- Fırat Çelik (born 1981), Turkish-German actor
- Fırat Kaya (born 1995), Germany-born Turkish deaf footballer
- Fırat Kocaoğlu (born 1988), Turkish footballer

== See also ==
- Firat (disambiguation)
- Burkan el-Fırat
