= Turkish television drama =

Overview of television serials in Turkey

Turkish dramas (Turkish: Türk dizileri) are a genre of television series made in Turkey. These dramas reflect Turkish culture and are considered by some to be one of the country's most important economic and cultural exports. They have seen significant growth since the 2000s, and Turkey surpassed Mexico and Brazil as the second-largest exporter of television series after the United States by the mid-2010s. The television industry has played a crucial role in increasing Turkey's popularity in Asia, Europe, Latin America, and North Africa.

Turkish series are chiefly produced in Istanbul, following the liberalization of private television in Turkey in the 1990s. Turkish television channels producing dramas include TRT, Kanal D, Show TV, Star TV, ATV, Now, TV8, and Kanal 7. The Turkish TV series market is characterized by intense local competition; out of the around 70 series produced annually in the country, only around 10% of them go on to a second season. Many are taken off air after running a few episodes without even completing their first season. Each episode of a Turkish drama is typically between 120 and 150 minutes in length, excluding advertisements. However, this does not apply to internet series.

Rapid content production has led to a perceived decline in quality. Some also complain that recent shows are produced for the international market and do not cater sufficiently to Turkish tastes. Furthermore, those working on such series, including actors, set designers, screenwriters, and costume designers, often have to work ceaselessly.

Turkish dramas tend to be inoffensive with widespread cultural appeal. They are exported to many countries, particularly in South America and Asia. Çalıkuşu was the first Turkish TV series to be exported internationally in 1986 to the Soviet Union. Turkish television shows are almost always dubbed or subtitled in multiple languages to accommodate the target country. The success of Turkish TV has also boosted tourism, as visitors are eager to visit the locations used in their favorite shows. The sudden and massive international popularity of Turkish TV dramas since the 2000s has been widely analyzed as a social phenomenon.

== Production ==
Production of Turkish television dramas is generally quite expensive, with a typical episode costing around 600,000 TL in 2016 (4,540,000 as of 2024) or around $200,000 at the time. Most of the budget is spent on production design, costumes, technical equipment and cast. Most series produce around 40 episodes during their run.

In the late 2000s, an episode of a Turkish television drama would typically last an average of 60 minutes. By 2010, this had risen to 90 minutes, and by 2016 to 130 minutes, leading to longer working hours, with crews having to work for 18 hours per day. This translates into around 5,200 hours of domestic TV content broadcast yearly. Meriç Demiray, a screenwriter who has written hundreds of pages for episodes since the early 2000s, commented in 2016 that "it was wonderful until about 10 years ago. Then I had to write a 60-minute episode per week, as opposed to today's 130-plus minutes. It has become a very mechanical and uninteresting process, just a question of keeping the melodrama going." He adds this has driven away the industry's most experienced professionals and that wages have not gone up much. Actor Kanbolat Görkem Arslan also said in 2016 that "compared to cinema or theatre there's no depth expected from a performance; the emotional curve of a character is not consistent from beginning to end. A character can change any minute according to audience reception."

Çağrı Vila Lostuvalı, 10 years in the business and four as a director, adds: "To deliver one episode per week, our crews work up to 18 hours a day. This job eats up our entire lives." According to Şükrü Avşar, one of the leading Turkish TV show producers and director of Avşar Film, some episodes need between 15 and 20 days of work to get satisfying results.

The average season length of a Turkish drama is around 35-40 episodes. New episodes are filmed 6 days a week to keep up with the demanding production schedule, and crews can work up to 18 hours a day.

Episodes are generally much longer than those of Western series, with 60% of series running between 120 and 180 minutes per episode including advertisements. When Turkish series are run in other markets such as the Balkans and southeastern Europe, episodes are usually split into shorter segments, usually not exceeding 60 minutes.

== History ==
Turkey's first TV series was Aşk-ı Memnu, which was produced in 1974. It was adapted from the eponymous 1899 novel by Halid Ziya Uşaklıgil. The series was released on TRT, the public broadcaster of Turkey. The era of TV dramas on TRT alone continued until 1986 and is referred to in Turkey as the "single channel period" (Turkish: tek kanal dönemi), and the shows themselves are called the "old TRT series" (Turkish: eski TRT dizileri). TRT was known for its adaptations of Turkish classic novels into historical TV miniseries.

Turkish Yeşilçam films (named after the eponymous Yeşilçam Street where many film studios were headquartered, similar to Hollywood) were more popular at the time. Yeşilçam stars did not play in TV series.

Other Turkish TV channels appeared in the 1990s, and TV production increased as a result.

Turkish TV series produced between 2000 and 2005 were between 60 and 80 minutes in length. Screenwriters could not finish scripts on time. Because of this, soundtrack music was added to scenes. It was widely successful, and Turkish TV series changed into one long music video.

Turkish TV series between 2005–2010 were, on average, 90 minutes in length. TV series became more popular than Turkish cinema, which mostly consisted of festival movies and comedy movies.

Adaptations of Turkish classic novels began to be produced. Authors whose works were commonly adapted included Reşat Nuri Güntekin, Orhan Kemal, Halid Ziya Uşaklıgil, Peyami Safa, Ayşe Kulin, Ahmet Ümit, Nermin Bezmen, Hande Altaylı, and Elif Şafak. However, these adaptations usually transformed the stories from their late 18th- to 20th-century settings to contemporary times.

In the 2010s, series ranged from 120 to 150 minutes in length on average, meaning an episode of a Turkish TV series is like a feature-length movie. The series range from period drama, modern-absurd comedy, crime, to romantic comedy. The most watched comedy series were Avrupa Yakası (2004–2009), Leyla ile Mecnun (2011–2013), Kardeş Payı (2014–2015), İşler Güçler (2012–2013), 1 Erkek 1 Kadın (2008–2015), Yalan Dünya (2012–2014), Tatlı Hayat (2001–2004) and Belalı Baldız (2005–2006).

== Milestones of Turkish TV dramas ==
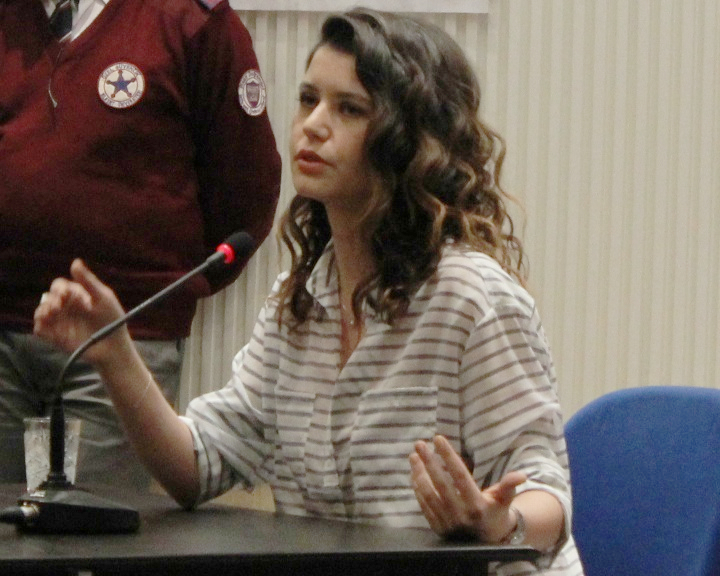
Beren Saat is a popular actress from the series Aşk-ı Memnu (2008–2010) and Fatmagül'ün Suçu Ne? (2010–2012)

Produced by the state-run channel TRT, Aşk-ı Memnu became the first Turkish TV series to be exported internationally when it was sold to France in 1981. Çalıkuşu (1986), also produced by TRT, was the first popular Turkish TV series broadcast in Soviet Russia. Deli Yürek was the first Turkish TV series sold to Kazakhstan. This sale marked the beginning of exports of Turkish TV series to private channels. Yabancı Damat was the first Turkish TV series sold to Greek channels. Turkish TV series started to gain popularity with the release of the Arabic-dubbed Turkish drama Gümüş in the Arab World. Turkish TV series are widely successful all over the Balkan Region. Suskunlar (Game of Silence) became the first Turkish drama to be remade in the US. Then Son was licensed as Runner for ABC, but it never aired. Son became the first Turkish TV series adapted in Western Europe, having been adapted by the Netherlands. Pasión Prohibida, a remake of Aşk-ı Memnu, was the first Spanish-language American remake of a Turkish drama, and was released in 2013. Interest in Turkish TV series in Latin America started with the TV series Binbir Gece, which was released in Chile in 2014. Many channels in Latin America have been broadcasting Turkish series, and many local remakes have aired. Adını Feriha Koydum was the first Turkish drama success in India. Kya Qusoor Hai Amala Ka? was the first Indian remake of the popular Turkish drama Fatmagül'ün Suçu Ne?, about a gang-raped girl's fight for justice. Fatmagül'ün Suçu Ne? was also remade in Spain as Alba for Netflix.

== Storytelling of Turkish TV series ==
=== Censorship, bans and self-censorship in Turkish TV series ===
In Turkey, the Radio and Television Supreme Council (RTÜK) regulates television channels. If the council deems a channel's content to be obscene, illegal, disruptive, or divisive, it may fine, suspend, or close the channel by revoking its license. Therefore, TV channels must pay close attention to their content. Punishments are often given for content that goes against the general moral code. Forbidden content is generally not shown on television; however, if it is shown, it is censored. However, the boundaries of what is considered immoral are often unclear and subjective. Therefore, what deserves punishment and what does not is controversial. For this reason, screenwriters have adopted self-censorship. According to one anonymous screenwriter, scenes involving alcohol or sexuality receive more attention than scenes involving abuse or violence.

- Cursing is censored in TV shows. Cursing is either suppressed by a beep or the sound is muted. If the curse is long, the scene may be cut completely.
- Making love and kissing scenes are sensitive subjects. It is not forbidden to show, but the boundaries are not sharp either.
- TV series are also shown by censoring alcohol, drugs and cigarettes, and encouraging the use of these substances is prohibited.
- Homosexual intercourse is a sensitive subject.
- Blood is also censored in TV series; scenes such as blood, body dismemberment and extreme violence are prohibited.
- Insulting and humiliating religion, nation, national values and state administrators is prohibited in TV series.

=== Values shown in Turkish series ===
Turkish shows have become popular in the Balkan region because they depict Islam, democracy, modernity, and traditionalism. Free of violence and obscene language, these shows appeal to viewers with their realistic characters and straightforward plots. They evoke nostalgia for family values that people in the region have lost.

According to Izzet Pinto, the head of Istanbul-based powerhouse distributor Global Agency, it is the "combination of family-based stories with big talents and directors, and great music" that attracts audiences so widely, and Turkish culture as a whole, which he calls both "modern, but at the same time, also very traditional".

Contrary to showing elements that are not accepted in the region in Western shows, similar social problems are told within acceptable limits in Turkish TV series.

For Latin America, the reasons were the cultural similarities, emphasis on family values, popularity of family viewing, attractive people, and picturesque locations.

Fatmagül'ün Suçu Ne? tells the story of a courageous woman who overcame challenges faced by women around the world and achieved success in many countries.

=== Criticism ===
Some religious authorities in the Middle East have condemned Turkish TV series as "immoral" due to taboo-breaking scenes, including those involving premarital sex, love triangles, and nudity. In some cases, the series have been banned altogether.

== Social and political discourse ==
Owing to their popularity, the government of Turkey has used Turkish television series as a propaganda outlet. Every year, the Turkish public broadcaster TRT commissions several series that depict the history and values of the Turkish nation from a conservative Islamic perspective. Diriliş: Ertuğrul (Resurrection: Ertuğrul), a historical drama inspired by the life of Ertuğrul Bey, son of Osman I, founder of the Ottoman Empire, is a prominent example of this.

State productions are also used to disparage or vilify critics. For instance, the TRT production Metamorfoz depicts Osman Kavala, a businessman and political activist who has been imprisoned since 2017, as an enemy of the state.

Journalist Nevşin Mengü said of the series Kızılcık Şerbeti, which depicts a cultural conflict between conservatives and secularists: "In this series, all the women fall head over heels for the Islamist men. The secular men are clueless and unable to provide for them. They wander around aimlessly. In contrast, the Islamist men provide for their families and earn money. Though it appears secular, it is actually propaganda for political Islam."

According to the Turkish University Women's Association, eight out of eleven TV series depict oppression and violence against women. These series normalize polygamy, learned helplessness among female characters, dirty competition and intrigue between men and women, gender inequality, cultural bigotry, neighborhood pressures, patriarchal mentalities, male-dominated cultures, acceptance of violence as part of men's nature, and social violence. These issues are normalized by presenting them in tense, intriguing scenarios that heighten their impact and by concluding episodes with exciting events that draw in the audience. Some series even legitimize these issues. These series act as role models, instilling a violent communication style in vulnerable audience members who cannot correctly interpret the content.

Asked why he was less visible in recent media, veteran actor Şevket Altuğ said: "The values of Turkish society have changed. The types of available work have also changed. Therefore, I can't participate in any series with the current content. They may interpret this as criticism or blame it on my age. All of this media shows guns, rifles, and people killing each other. All the men have beards. In our time, men only grew beards if their roles required it. I can't be part of this environment. In our work, we tried to teach society about love, tolerance, living together, and solidarity. If I were offered a role in such a production, I could play it despite my age. However, I don't think I will encounter such an opportunity."

== Business and finance ==
Turkish shows began expanding internationally in 1999, but only started to gain popularity in the early 21st century. In order to be able to produce high-quality content and to be competitive with the non-Turkish shows that were gaining traction in Turkey, more money was needed, and the financial deficit was made up for through expansion to non-domestic markets. The Turkish government also played a role in motivating international expansion, creating incentives by granting awards and support to the companies that are most effective in exporting worldwide.

In 2017, Turkish TV exports earned $350 million, officially marking the country as the second largest drama exporter in the world behind the United States. According to the Secretary General of the TEA, Bader Arslan, Turkey's yearly income from TV exports will exceed 1 billion U.S. dollars by 2023. Turkish series are exported to approximately 140 countries around the world.

Today, there are about 45 production companies and 150 active film directors in Turkey. The production cost of a series may vary between 78,000 and 520,000 U.S. dollars (for the most famous ones).

== Streaming ==
Turkish streaming began in the late 2010s. Foreign streaming platforms include Netflix, Disney+, Prime Video, HBO Max, and MUBI, and notable native platforms include tabii, Exxen, and GAİN.

=== Netflix ===
Since the late 2010s, American streaming service Netflix has produced original Turkish dramas and films for its platform. Its first original Turkish series, The Protector (Hakan: Muhafız), was released on 14 December 2018. According to Danielle Turchiano of Variety, Netflix is the only streaming platform to buy substantial amounts of Turkish television series. Fatma, Love 101, 50m2, Bir Başkadır, Rise of Empires: Ottoman, and The Gift are among the Netflix series that gathered success in Turkey as well as many other countries.

Several Turkish television series have ranked among the most-watched Netflix series worldwide at various times. For instance, The Club (Kulüp) was watched for a total of 7,860,000 hours during the week of 8–14 November, ranking 8th on Netflix's non-English language series list, thus making it one of the top 10 most-watched series.

=== Disney+ ===
The first Turkish original drama for Disney+, Kaçış, aired on 14 June 2022.

=== Censorship ===
Turkish streaming has come under the scrutiny of Turkish state media regulator RTÜK. For example, as part of the 2025 "Year of the Family" initiative, it fined Disney+, Prime Video, Netflix, HBO Max, and MUBI for series that "promote homosexuality," "disregard family values," and "conflict with the shared values of society."

== International popularity ==
Due to a long history of state oversight, Turkish television series have largely removed any content that the government might find objectionable. As a result, they lack political narratives or references. This has led producers to innovate by focusing on universal human dramas with simple plotlines. The stories mostly fall into non-Turkey-specific archetypes, such as love triangles, family feuds, and revenge sagas. As no prior knowledge of Turkey is required to understand these stories, the series have gained widespread popularity around the world.

=== Turkic countries ===
There are varying levels of mutual intelligibility among the various Turkic languages, especially among Turkish and Azerbaijani, which are both Oghuz languages. Thus, in Azerbaijan, the shows are not subtitled because the general public can understand them. Turkish shows are also aired in the de facto independent Turkish-speaking state of Northern Cyprus.

Turkic languages more distant from Turkish, such as Turkmen, Kazakh, Kyrgyz and Uzbek, require subtitles as they have a lesser degree of mutual intelligibility. Turkish TV series are popular in the Turkic countries of Central Asia. An Uzbek remake of the Turkish drama Kırgın Çiçekler aired as Бир ками тўлмаган дунё in 2015.

=== Arab world ===
Turkish TV series began to rise in popularity across the Arab world in 2008, when MBC Group began to acquire the rights for the series. MBC is a popular Saudi Arabian broadcasting network. Instead of dubbing the shows in classical Arabic, they were rendered in Syrian Arabic, a dialectal variant readily understood by ordinary viewers across the Middle East.

Led by Gümüş (known as Noor in the Arab market), a wave of Turkish melodramas made their way onto Arab televisions, wielding a kind of soft power. The show violated the local conservative cultural norms, showing some Muslim characters drinking wine with dinner and engaging in premarital sex. The Arabic-dubbed finale of the Turkish TV series Gümüş (Silver), aired on 30 August 2008, was watched by 85 million viewers. In 2008, the grand mufti of Saudi Arabia Abdulaziz al-Sheikh issued a fatwa against channels that broadcast Gümüş, saying anyone who broadcast it was "an enemy of God and his Prophet". Other Turkish dramas aired in the Arab world include Asi, Kurtlar Vadisi, Menekşe ile Halil, and Yabancı Damat.

In March 2018, MBC pulled all Turkish dramas off the air. Danielle Turchiano of Variety considers this a result of the political tensions between Saudi Arabia and Turkey. The head of the Turkish Sales Company Global Agency, İzzet Pinto, said that he believed this was a political decision against the Turkish government.

In 2019, Mashaer became the first Arabic TV series to be produced with a Turkish scriptwriting and directing team. This was done to capitalize on the popularity of Turkish TV series in Arab countries.

İstanbullu Gelin (Bride from Istanbul) was adapted into an Arab series titled Bride from Beirut, which aired on MBC in 2019. An Arabic remake, Ala Al Hilwa Wa Al Morra of İyi Günde Kötü Günde, was made in 2021. The MBC-linked Arab digital platform Shahid is still showing Turkish dramas despite the tension. During Ramadan in 2020 and 2021, channels broadcast many Turkish series in Lebanon.

Hab Mlouk, an Algerian-Tunisian remake of Afili Aşk, aired in April 2022.

MBC Group signed a five-year output and co-development deal with Medyapım and fellow Turkish company Ay Yapım, in October 2022. It also includes a pact to exchange know-how and co-develop original Arabic-language content for the MENA region, to be filmed in Saudi Arabia.

Many Turkish actors and actresses received awards from award ceremonies in the Arab world.

=== Asia ===
==== Afghanistan ====
Turkish TV series dubbed in Dari Persian have become very popular in Afghanistan, with ratings going higher than the traditional Indian TV series that Afghans watched. As of 2012, Fatmagül'ün Suçu Ne? is shown on TOLO TV. Other series such as Öyle Bir Geçer Zaman Ki (As Time Goes By), Beni Affet (Forgive Me), İffet, Aşk-ı Memnu (Forbidden Love), and Adını Feriha Koydum are popular too.

==== Armenia ====
The first Turkish drama to be remade in Armenia was Ezel, under the name Ancanoty, by Shant TV, one of the biggest channels in Armenia. The Armenian adaptation of the Turkish series Kara Sevda was broadcast under the name Kayaran (Կայարանt, 'Station'). Turkish series are also watched in the Armenian diaspora in Russia and elsewhere.

==== Bangladesh ====
Turkish series began to gain popularity in Bangladesh with the arrival of Muhteşem Yüzyıl. Renamed Sultan Süleyman after the Ottoman sultan it depicts, the show aired on Deepto TV, which launched in November 2015. The channel's inaugural program was the first two episodes of the series. It was the first Turkish drama series to air on Bangladeshi television. By the first week of January, the program had earned the second-highest TRP. By the second week, it had reached the top spot among all Bangladeshi TV channels.

==== India ====
In September 2015, the first Turkish drama on Indian television, Adını Feriha Koydum, aired on Zindagi and became a huge success. The third and final season of the show was broadcast in India in 2016 as "Feriha-New Season" by Zindagi due to overwhelming audience request. Fatmagul'ün Suçu Ne? is also extremely well received and appreciated by Indian audiences. The show also helped Zindagi to become the number one premium entertainment channel, garnering impressive ratings. The viewership of the channel increased due to this show. Kuzey Güney, Adını Feriha Koydum, Aşk Laftan Anlamaz, Küçük Ağa are some of the most popular and highest-rated shows in India. From 25 June 2018, StarPlus started broadcasting Kış Güneşi as its first Turkish show dubbed in the Hindi language.

In the aftermath of the 2016 Uri attack, which strained India–Pakistan relations, Pakistani series on Zindagi were replaced by Turkish ones.

Kya Qusoor Hai Amala Ka? and Dil Sambhal Jaa Zara, Indian adaptations of Fatmagül'ün Suçu Ne? and Aşk-ı Memnu, were aired in 2017. Binbir Gece was remade as Katha Ankahee and aired on Sony Entertainment Television.

==== Iran ====
IRIB was one of the first networks to invest in Turkish series. IRIB TV3 used to air Sırlar Dünyası (Persian: کلید اسرار, Kelid-e Asrâr). After the show got extremely popular in Iran during the early 2010s, they were dubbed into Persian by various satellite channels. Among the most popular series were Aşk-ı Memnu (عشق ممنوع, 'Eshgh-e Mamnoo'), Sırlar Dünyası, and Fatmagül'ün Suçu Ne? (گناه فاطما گل چه بود؟, Gonâh-e Fâtmâ Gol Cheh Bood?). Turkish shows lost popularity after the early 2010s when the Iranian government tried to boost their popularity by lifting production restrictions and creating more entertainment content. Turkish shows are often too long to fit into Iranians' daily lives, and they have been accused of promoting disloyalty, anger, and backstabbing.

==== Israel ====
Menekşe ile Halil was the first Turkish TV series to air in Israel, doing so in 2011. It was dubbed into Hebrew and aired five days a week during primetime on Viva. İstanbullu Gelin also received high ratings in Israel, especially among women. The star of the series, Özcan Deniz, performed concerts in Israel, and Berkay Hardal appeared in Israeli commercials.

==== Indonesia ====
Paramparça aired on ANTV. The Turkish series Kırgın Çiçekler was broadcast on Indonesia's ANTV channel and became the 'Most Watched' production by female viewers aged 20–29. Turkish drama Elif aired in Indonesia, and a local remake was made as Elif Indonesia on SCTV.

==== Japan ====
Magnificent Century aired on Channel Ginga as オスマン帝国外伝～愛と欲望のハレム〜 in Japan. The Japanese broadcaster Nippon TV has acquired the rights to the Turkish drama series Anne, a remake of the Japanese drama Mother. Anne will air on BS Nippon TV and Hulu in Japan. Kadın, a remake of Japanese drama Woman, won the Special Award (Foreign dramas) at the Tokyo Drama Awards.

==== Malaysia ====
The first Turkish series broadcast on Malaysian National Channel RTM was Bu Şehir Arkandan Gelecek (Heart of the City). A Malaysian remake of Rüzgarın Kalbi aired as Degup Cinta in 2020.

==== Philippines ====
In 2018, the Philippine network GMA aired the country's first Turkish drama, Bana Sevmeyi Anlat, under the title Wings of Love. ETC channel also aired Her Yerde Sen (Everywhere I Go), Kara Sevda and Aşk Laftan Anlamaz.

==== Pakistan ====
Turkish series are also popular in Pakistan. Aşk-ı Memnu aired on the television channel Urdu1 in Pakistan and topped ratings, being the most successful Turkish series there. Other popular series include Fatmagül'ün Suçu Ne?, which aired on the same channel, and Muhteşem Yüzyıl (Magnificent Century). According to Pakistani rating network Media Logic, Aşk-ı Memnu was watched by more than 90 million people on its last episode, whereas it averaged 45–55 million viewers from the rural and urban market. Moreover, Fatmagül'ün Suçu Ne? and Adını Feriha Koydum averaged 30 million and 28 million viewership respectively from rural and urban market.

The popularity of Turkish series has led to some difficulties. Pakistan's entertainment industry has complained that airing Turkish and other foreign TV series diverts funding from local productions. Furthermore, a senate committee that oversees information and broadcasting has condemned such shows for their allegedly vulgar content, which contradicts Pakistani Muslim traditions.

==== South Korea ====
In 2017, the series Fi was sold to GTV channel in South Korea. In 2021, Kırmızı Oda was sold to the South Korean channel, Kuki TV. Ezel won the Special Award in the Drama category at the 7th Seoul International Drama Awards. Medcezir won the Silver Award for Best Drama at the 9th Seoul International Drama Awards. Kara Sevda won the Special Jury Award in the Drama category at the 10th Seoul International Drama Awards held in South Korea. Engin Akyürek received the "Best Actor" award at the 10th Seoul International Drama Awards. Kerem Bürsin won the "Best Actor" award at the 12th Seoul International Drama Awards. Turkish drama, Çarpışma, won the Silver Award in the Best Drama category at the 14th Seoul International Drama Awards. The Pit won the Special Jury Award at the 16th Seoul International Drama Awards. At the 17th Seoul Drama Awards, two Turkish dramas Destan and Mahkum (itself an adaptation of the South Korean drama Innocent Defendant) won the 'Best Series Award'.

Deha from Ay Yapım won the Best Series Award at the Seoul International Drama Awards in 2025.

==== Vietnam ====
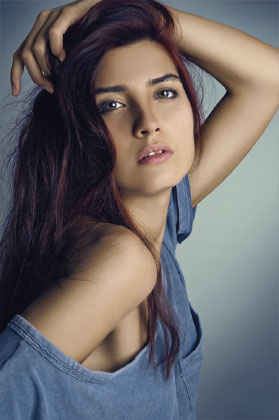
Tuba Büyüküstün is the lead actress of Brave and Beautiful and Rise of Empires: Ottoman

Cesur ve Güzel (Brave and Beautiful) aired on HTV7 from 8 February 2017, under the Vietnamese title Yêu trong lửa hận.

=== Europe ===
==== Balkans ====
Turkish TV shows are widely successful all over the Balkan Region. Serbian sociologist Ratko Božović explains this popularity by pointing to the traditional, patriarchal values of the Turkish shows, and the many cultural and linguistic similarities between Turkey and the Balkan countries: "The mentality depicted in those shows has to do with a traditional understanding of morality that people in the Balkans remember at some level". According to him, all Balkan countries have seen dramatic changes in terms of family life, and the Turkish shows help them recall value systems that now seem lost.

The most watched show in Bosnia and Herzegovina was Muhteşem Yüzyıl. In Kosovo, the most popular TV shows in December 2012 were Fatmagül'ün Suçu Ne?, which ranked top of all programmes and Aşk ve Ceza, which came in third according to data by Index Kosova. A study found that the two most popular Turkish TV shows in Serbia in January 2013 were Muhteşem Yüzyıl, which ranked fourth, and Öyle Bir Geçer Zaman Ki (As Time Goes By), which ranked seventh. In North Macedonia, Öyle Bir Geçer Zaman ki and Asi were the top two shows in terms of viewers in January 2013, according to Nielsen Media Research. In fact, Turkish shows are so successful in North Macedonia that the government has passed a bill to restrict broadcasts of Turkish series during the day and at prime time to reduce the Turkish impact on North Macedonia's society.

They are also widely watched by Bulgarian viewers. Nova Televizia broke the record for viewer numbers when it started broadcasting the Turkish TV series Binbir Gece. The channel then decided to broadcast another Turkish show, Dudaktan Kalbe.

Binbir Gece became a primetime hit in Bosnia, Montenegro and North Macedonia, as well as in Romania, Albania and Greece. It has increased the popularity of Istanbul as a tourist destination among Croatians, and led to a greater interest in learning Turkish.

==== Slovakia ====
In Slovakia, the popularity of Turkish series has improved the public image of Turkey itself.

==== Greece ====
Turkish TV series were also popular in Greece until their widespread removal from Greek TV in 2020 due to Turkish incursions into Greek territorial waters. After 2019, due to the resurgence of Greek language programming, Turkish series have largely disappeared from Greek television. The Greek Orthodox Bishop Anthimos criticised Greek fans of Turkish TV series after Yabancı Damat (The Foreign Groom) was one of the first Turkish series to become popular in Greece in 2005.

Yabancı Damat started airing in Greece on 11 July 2005, recording a viewing rate of 31.7%; the last episode aired on 5 July 2008, recording a viewing rate of 31.8%. Binbir Gece started being shown in June 2010, by ANT1, recording a viewership rate of 18.7%. The last episode aired on 1 February 2011, scoring 24.3%, while the highest percentage was 43.8% on 6 August 2010. Another popular drama was Sıla; it aired in Greece on 10 June 2012, on MEGA. The series Elif had a particularly significant average viewership share: 16.8% of all viewers; it was watched daily by an average of about 450,000 viewers.

Recently, Greek television channels have started broadcasting their own adaptations of Turkish TV shows.

==== Romania ====
The series Ezel was adapted by Romanian TV channel Pro TV under the title Vlad. O Hayat Benim was remade by Calinos Entertainment as Adela in 2020. Fructul oprit, a Romanian adaptation of Aşk-ı Memnu, was also produced by Antena 1 in 2018. İçerde was remade as The Clan (Clanul) and aired on Pro TV starting August 2022.

==== Spain ====
Following their success in Latin America, Turkish TV series have attracted significant interest in Spain. In 2018, Spanish channel Nova started showing Fatmagül'ün Suçu Ne?, which went on to become its most popular series. Building on this success, Nova began airing other Turkish series, including Kara Para Aşk, Elif, Ezel, Sıla, Medcezir, Anne, One Thousand and One Nights, and Adını Feriha Koydum. At the same time, Spanish broadcaster Atresmedia adapted Fatmagül'ün Suçu Ne? as Alba.

Other Turkish dramas that have received high ratings on different Spanish channels include Kadın (adapted into Mujer), Sen Çal Kapımı, Erkenci Kuş, Kızım, Bir Zamanlar Çukurova (adapted into Tierra Amarga) and Sadakatsiz (adapted into Infiel). Kadın was the first Turkish series aired in prime time in Spain; it has managed to lead its time slot for a year, even facing great products and being broadcast for several days in a row. Sadakatsiz aired in Spain with an average audience of 2.3 million viewers, which makes it one of the foreign series with the best debut since 2020. Caner Cindoruk was on the cover of Spain's "Albacete A Mano" magazine for the promotion of the TV series Sadakatsiz.

While it was being produced by Turkish Netflix, the series, Eğer Bilseydim, whose production was not made due to censorship, written by Ece Yörenç, will be broadcast by Spanish Netflix under the name of Si lo Hubiera Sabido.

A Spanish remake of the Turkish drama Anne (Mother) will air as Heridas on Antena 3. Another Spanish remake of Turkish drama Son aired as El Accidente on Telecinco in 2017.

Mediapro and Medyapım established a Spanish-Turkish co-production company in 2022, focusing on making Spanish remakes of Turkish dramas.

Sadakatsiz premiered with a powerful 18.1% rating on Antena 3 and 2,357,000 viewers, and it was the leader every Sunday and moved around a 14-15% share in Spain. The final episode of Kızım (as Mi hija) aired as the most-watched series on Antena 3 with an average of more than 2.4 million viewers and a 16.8% share, also placing it as a leader on Sunday nights.

Çilek Kokusu will be broadcast by Mediaset Spain's Divinity channel under the name Com olor a fresas. The series will be broadcast every weekday. The same channel bought the broadcasting rights for Spain of Bu Şehir Arkandan Gelecek and Kaderimin Oyunu.

==== Italy ====
Cherry Season was the first Turkish TV series to be broadcast in Italy and received high ratings on Canale 5. Turkish TV series such as Dolunay and Erkenci Kuş made Can Yaman an idol in Italy. Fan clubs were established for the duo of Can Yaman and Demet Özdemir. The actors of the Early Bird and Cherry Season series participated in talk shows in Italy. The series starring Kerem Bürsin and Hande Erçel on 'Canale 5' was broadcast under the name 'Love is in the Air'.

The first episode of Sevgili Geçmiş was watched by 2 million 472 thousand people on Canale 5 with 13.4 per cent in primetime and took first place. Turkish TV series Brave & Beautiful met with the audience on 5 July in Italy on Canale 5.

The broadcasting rights of Once Upon a Time in Çukurova were purchased by Italian Mediaset. The drama aired as Terra amara on Canale 5. The stars of the drama participated in talk shows in Italy and received awards at the 17th "Nations Awards-Thinking Green Taormina". The prime-time broadcast of Once Upon a Time in Çukurova on Sunday, 14 January received higher ratings than a TV program in which Pope Francis appeared as a special guest. The grand finale of Once Upon a Time in Çukurova, which was broadcast under the name Terra amara, received 18.2% in prime time and 19.83% in late-night hours on Saturday, 8 June.

==== Russia ====
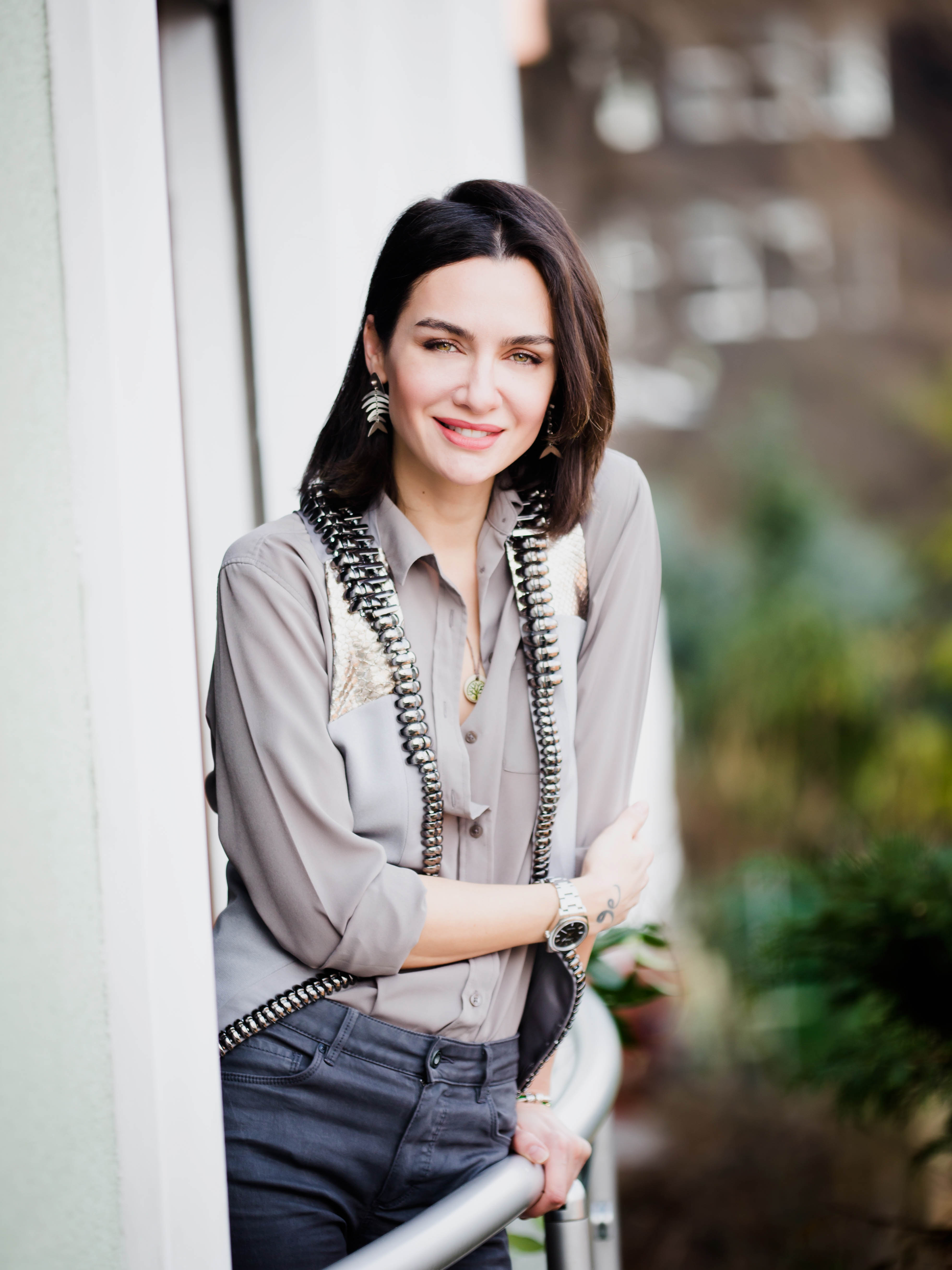
Birce Akalay is the lead actress of Siyah Beyaz Aşk

The first popular Turkish TV series in Russia was Çalıkuşu, broadcast in 1986. Kurt Seyit ve Şura was broadcast on Russia's Domashny television channel in 2015. Muhteşem Yüzyıl was shown on Domashny in 2012 as Великолепный век. The series Kalbimin Sultanı (Sultan of my Heart), while not successful in Turkey, was broadcast on Channel One, Russia's largest channel, in 2019, and it took the number one spot as the most-watched TV series in Russia. Siyah Beyaz Aşk was aired in Russia on the Domashniy channel. Anne, Kara Sevda, Kara Para Aşk and Meryem aired in Russia as well. Kara Sevda gained popularity in Russia. Russian viewers enjoyed watching not only the original episode, but also reruns of Kara Sevda. Marina Hripunova, General Manager of the Russian Domashniy television channel, said, "We cannot do without Turkish TV series. Turkish TV series are watched with great interest in Russia." Turkish star Tuba Büyüküstün became the face of Russian mobile operator, Megafon, in 2021.

A Russian remake of Paramparça aired in 2018 as Oskolki (Осколки) on WeIT Media.

==== Ukraine ====
Muhteşem Yüzyıl aired on Ukrainian Channel 1+1 in 2012. As of August 2017, Kara Sevda also started being broadcast on 1+1 with the name Нескінченне кохання. A Ukrainian remake of Ezel aired as Узнай меня, если сможешь in 2014, while Siyah Beyaz Aşk was remade as На твоей стороне in 2019.

==== France ====
The series Kara Sevda, Ölene Kadar, Fatmagül'ün Suçu Ne?, and Bu Şehir Arkandan Gelecek were broadcast on Africa-based Novelas TV, which also broadcasts in France. Fatmagül'ün Suçu Ne? was selected as the Best Foreign Series at the Soap Awards in 2019.

==== Germany ====
Şahsiyet became the first Turkish TV series sold to Germany. It was dubbed into German, under the title Ein guter Mensch. Magarsus won the 'Stellar Cast' award at the 7th Berlin TV Series Festival.

==== Sweden ====
The Swedish public broadcaster SVT acquired the series Son (The End), becoming the first major broadcaster in Western Europe to buy a Turkish TV series in 2013. According to Swedish television critic Anders Björkman, the series was the best foreign show this season in all categories.

==== Netherlands ====
Son was remade in 2016 on KRO-NCRV, one of the leading Dutch television channels, under the name Vlucht HS13 (Flight HS13). Thus, it became the first Turkish TV series adapted in Western Europe.

==== United Kingdom ====
Who Were We Running From? Season 1 ranked #6 on Netflix UK Top 10.

=== United States ===
The drama Suskunlar was remade as Game of Silence on NBC. The drama Son was sold to 20th Century Fox Television in the United States and was adapted into a pilot named Runner for ABC. On 20 November 2017, Kara Sevda won an Emmy for Best Telenovela of the Year. Turkish actor Haluk Bilginer was selected as the 'Best Actor' for his role in the TV series Şahsiyet at the 47th International Emmy Awards. The BluTV and FX special production crime drama Alef was selected in Variety's "Top 15 International TV Series of 2020" list. The show also won the "best crime drama" and "best credits" awards at the New York Festivals in the US.

The Netflix fantasy drama Shahmaran ranked #9 on Netflix in the US Top 10. Another Netflix drama, Who Were We Running From? ranked #9 and #4 consecutively in the US Top 10 for 20 March – 2 April. Make Me Believe ranked #10 in the USA Top 10.

On 20 November 2023, Yargı (Family Secrets) won an Emmy for Best Telenovela of the Year at the 51st annual International Emmy Awards.

=== Latin America ===
Turkish dramas have become popular in Latin America after being dubbed into Spanish and Portuguese. Due to the popularity, new Turkish shows continue to be dubbed into Spanish and Portuguese. In 2017, 25% of the biggest 7 Turkish exporting companies' business came from Latin America.

The popularity of Turkish shows in Latin America has been credited to multiple factors. Burhan Gün, the president of the Turkish TV and Cinema Producers Guild, has stated that one reason is that Latin Americans and Turkish people can often look similar to each other. Gün has also expressed that Turkish shows portray storylines relating to migration patterns that are similar in many developing nations. Many shows portray plots about moving from rural areas to cities, and the challenges that come with this transition.

ATV has sold rights to air the series Hercai in various international markets, including most of Latin America and the United States through Telemundo, which premiered on 22 June 2021. Exathlon, a physical challenge reality franchise created by Turkish company Acun Medya and first aired in Brazil, has inspired local versions of the show to be created in Latin America, such as Exatlón México in Mexico.

In 2020, Taner Ölmez, the lead actor of Mucize Doktor, won the "Best Foreign Actor" award at the Produ Awards, one of the most important awards of the television industry in Latin America. "Bir Zamanlar Çukurova" was announced as the "Best Foreign Series" and received one of the biggest awards at the Produ Awards. Vahide Perçin won the grand prize in the "Best Foreign Actress" category.

HBO has launched a category for Turkish series on its digital platform in Latin America. To create this category, they signed a three-year agreement with Madd Entertainment, adding ten Turkish TV series to their catalogue. As of October 2021, Mucize Doktor was the most-watched series on HBO Max. Sen Çal Kapımı ranked second in the Top 10 list on HBOMAXLA. It ranked first in Chile, Uruguay and Colombia, and third in Mexico and Argentina.

==== Chile ====
In Chile, the most watched Turkish show in 2014 was Binbir Gece. According to a report by the German public broadcasting network ARD, Mega, the first Chilean channel to broadcast Turkish TV series, was saved from bankruptcy thanks to Binbir Gece. Sıla received ratings comparable to those for the Copa América qualifying match between Brazil and Chile.

==== Brazil ====
Binbir Gece was the first Turkish TV series to be broadcast in Brazil, where it aired on TV Band in 2015. Then Fatmagül'ün Suçu Ne and Sıla aired. Sıla had the best first-week rating of Turkish soap operas on TV Band. HBO Max Brasil added the Turkish soap opera Sen Çal Kapımı to its Brazilian catalog, where it quickly became one of the most-watched shows.

==== Colombia ====
The series Cesur ve Güzel, Fazilet Hanım ve Kızları (Mrs. Fazilet and Her Daughters), Binbir Gece, Kara Para Aşk, Fatma Gül'ün Suçu Ne, Adını Feriha Koydum, Ezel, Muhteşem Yüzyıl and Elif broadcast in the country.

==== Argentina ====
In Argentina, the show Fatmagül'ün Suçu Ne? is extremely popular, with more than 12 million Argentine viewers watching each episode. Mucize Doktor, which started broadcasting on Argentina's top channel Telefe, received a rating of 14.2 in its first episode, making it the second-highest opening performance for a Turkish series. Two days later, on Wednesday, it reached the highest rating for a Turkish drama with a rating of 21.5.

==== Mexico ====
Adapted from the Turkish TV series Kara Para Aşk, Imperio de mentiras was broadcast on a Mexican Televisa channel. The Mexican adaptation of Ezel was released in 2018 under the name Yago for Televisa. El Asesino Del Olvido, the Mexican remake of the Turkish series Şahsiyet, was aired. A remake of Gecenin Kraliçesi was broadcast on Las Estrellas as ¿Te acuerdas de mí? in 2021.

==== Hispanic community in the US ====
Kara Sevda, which aired on Univision in the United States, became the most-watched foreign soap opera in the country's history. It surpassed its main competitors in the Spanish-language market. It is also the most-watched Turkish series. The series averaged more than two million viewers per episode, with nearly four million tuning in for the finale.

A Spanish-language American remake titled Pasión prohibida of Aşk-ı Memnu began airing in 2013.

Sefirin Kızı made Univision the first U.S. network among Hispanic viewers in the weeknight 10 p.m. slot in 2021.

=== South Africa ===
In late 2017, South Africa's free-to-air channel e.tv closed a deal with Turkey's Kanal D to air various Kanal D dramas. These Turkish telenovelas were dubbed into Afrikaans and proved to be highly successful for the channel, which led e.tv to launch a separate channel called ePlesier (ePleasure) as a new Afrikaans TV channel on its free-to-air satellite service OpenView HD on 18 April 2022. As a result, many more telenovelas were acquired, and the channel still operates as of 2023. The channel also provided a great amount of voice artist work for South African actors. With the increasing popularity of Afrikaans-dubbed Turkish telenovelas, another South African channel, KykNet&Kie, also started broadcasting such telenovelas in July 2023. The channel acknowledged that "dubbing of such big series also creates dozens of job opportunities in the Afrikaans TV industry for talent behind the screens and in front of the microphone".

The Netflix drama Fatma was also adapted for South African Netflix as Unseen.

=== Elsewhere ===
As of 2016, Turkish soap operas are popular in Ethiopia through Kana TV, where they are dubbed into Amharic. Son Yaz was released in Angola and Mozambique.

== See also ==
- Ay Yapım
- List of Turkish television series
- Television in Turkey
