= Metin Çekmez =

Turkish actor (1945–2021)

- Born: 26 July 1945; Istanbul, Turkey
- Died: 25 August 2021 (aged 76); Aydın, Turkey
- Education: Pertevniyal High School, Marmara University
- Alma mater: Faculty of Communication
- Occupation: Actor
- Years active: 1962–2021
- Television: Binbir Gece, 20 Dakika, Adini Feriha Koydum
- Relatives: Dinçer Çekmez (brother)

Metin Çekmez (26 July 1945 – 25 August 2021) was a Turkish actor.

== Career ==
He appeared in more than 20 films since 1972, and in numerous television series, including:

- Binbir Gece as Burhan Evliyaoglu
- 20 Dakkika as Necmettin Solmaz
- Adini Feriha Koydum as Riza Yilmaz
- Kaderimin Yazıldığı Gün as Kahraman's father, Ziya Yörükhan

== Personal life and death ==
Metin Çekmez was the younger brother of actor Dinçer Çekmez. He died on 25 August 2021 from cancer.

== Selected filmography ==
Film
Year	Title	Role	Notes
1972	Tatli Dillim		
1973	Yalamci Yarin	Metin	
1973	Kartal yuvasi	Dimitri	
1974	Bosver arkadas	Kamil	
1984	Firat		
1984	Namuslu	Kasap	
1984	Atla Gel Saban		
1985	Kurbagalar		
1987	Sis		
1987	Kurtar beni		
1991	Siyabend U Hece	Hesinkar	
1992	The Shadow Play	Ramazan	
1999	Güvercin		
2017	Kurtlar Vadisi - Vatan	Ali	

TV
Year	Title	Role	Notes
1993-1997	Süper Baba	Cevdet	
1994	Kurtulus		
2003	Baba	Tahsin	
2004	Zümrüt	Süleyman	
2005	Köpek	Mengene Hayri	
2005	Yürek çigligi	Nevzat	
2006	Kus dili	Temel Reis	
2006-2009	Binbir Gece	Burhan Evliyaoglu	
2011–2012	Adını Feriha Koydum	Rıza Yılmaz	
2013	20 Dakika	Necmettin Solmaz	
2014-2015	Kaderimin Yazildigi Gün	Ziya Yörükhan	
2017	Kurtlar Vadisi Vatan	Ali	
2018	Adı: Zehra	Rifat	
