= Daha 17 =

2026 Turkish television series

- Also known as: Torn Apart
- Daha 17
- Genre: Drama; Youth
- Written by: Gökhan Korkusuz; Redife Zerener; Cenk Boğatur; Pelin Gülcan; Gökçe Tezdoğan; Nejdet Erdem
- Story by: Gökhan Korkusuz; Redife Zerener
- Directed by: Emre Kabakuşak; Murat Aksu
- Starring: Nesrin Cavadzade; Çağan Efe Ak; Armağan Oğuz; Ceren Ayruk; Ata Yaşat; Dilara Aksüyek
- Theme music composer: Şahin Kurnaz
- Country of origin: Turkey
- Original language: Turkish
- No. of seasons: 1
- No. of episodes: 26

Production
- Producers: Yaşar İrvül; Efe İrvül
- Production company: Pastel Film

Original release
- Network: Kanal D
- Release: May 31, 2026 – present

Daha 17 (English: Torn Apart) is a Turkish television series in the drama and youth genres, produced by Pastel Film, with the first episode airing on May 31, 2026. It is directed by Emre Kabakuşak and Murat Aksu, and written by Gökhan Korkusuz, Redife Zerener, and Cenk Boğatur. The series stars Nesrin Cavadzade, Çağan Efe Ak, Armağan Oğuz, Ceren Ayruk, Ata Yaşat, and Dilara Aksüyek. The series airing every Sunday, at 20:00 on Kanal D.

== Cast and characters ==
- Şebnem Akkaya (Nesrin Cavadzade), (Episoden 1-)
- Aras Öztürk (Çağan Efe Ak), (Episoden 1-)
- Hakan Akkaya (Armağan Oğuz), (Episoden 1-)
- Leyla Akkaya (Ceren Ayruk), (Episoden 1-)
- Teoman Akkaya / Demir Öztürk (Ata Yaşat), (Episoden 1-)
- Nuray Soysal (Dilara Aksüyek), (Episoden 1-)
- Deniz Soysal (Helin Elveren), (Episoden 1-)
- Bariş Taşer (Deniz Ali Cankorur), (Episoden 1-)
- Ezgi Gösterişli (Berra Ahsen Uslu), (Episoden 1-)
- Kutay Yurt (Batuhan Mora), (Episoden 1-)
- Metin Pekgüven (Ahmetcan Özer), (Episoden 1-)
- Sila Çağlayan (Ezgi Dalgıç), (Episoden 1-)
- Mustafa Taşer (Cemal Toktaş), (Episoden 1-)
- Suna Altınsu (Güneş Hayat), (Episoden 1-)
- Özlem Altınsu (Melis Babadağ), (Episoden 1-)
- İlhan Soysal (Bülent Seyran), (Episoden 1-)
- Ali Soysal (Yusuf Selim Uğurlu), (Episoden 1-)
