= 20 Dakika =

Turkish television drama series

- Written by: Kerem Deren; Pınar Bulut
- Directed by: Serdar Işık; Ali Bilgin
- Starring: Tuba Büyüküstün; İlker Aksum; Fırat Çelik; Bülent Emin Yarar; Müjde Uzman; İpek Bilgin; Ayten Uncuoğlu; Cihat Tamer; Metin Çekmez; Perihan Erener
- Country of origin: Turkey
- Original language: Turkish
- No. of seasons: 1
- No. of episodes: 25

Production
- Producer: Kerem Çatay
- Running time: 90-120 min.
- Production company: Ay Yapım

Original release
- Network: Star TV
- Release: January 1 – June 27, 2013

20 Dakika ("20 Minutes") is a Turkish television drama series broadcast on Star TV. This story talks about a beautiful family. A father, mother, daughter and a son that lived together in happiness and peace. One day, the police stormed in and took the mother (Tuba Büyüküstün) to jail. She was suspected of committing a murder and sentenced to 20 years in prison. Her husband (Ilker Aksum) tries to prove her innocence while at the same time the criminal investigator (Firat Celik) attempts to find as much evidence as he can to discover the truth. The big question however is did she really commit the murder?

== Cast and characters ==
- Tuba Büyüküstün as Melek Halaskar, a woman framed for a murder that she may or may not have committed; Ali's wife
- İlker Aksum as Ali Halaskar, a school teacher, and Melek's husband, a man determined to save his wife and break her out of jail, no matter the cost
- Fırat Çelik as Ozan Çevikoğlu, a detective whose interest in Melek's case may pull him in much further than he expects and he might possibly have feelings for Melek
- Bülent Emin Yarar as Mesut Bilaloğlu, otherwise known as Kedi (cat), a previously convicted man who managed to escape prison seven times, but was caught each time. The trick was that he did it within 20 minutes. Ali discovered this in intense research and requested his help for breaking Melek out.
- Ayten Uncuoğlu as Zeynep Halaskar
- Cihat Tamer as Nedim Halaskar
- İpek Bilgin as Muavin Süreyya Gürok
- Müjde Uzman as Kuzgun, Kedi's daughter. She does her best to assist Ali and her father, often becoming a partner in crime. She, however, falls in love with Ali and this complicates things.
- Defne Kayalar as Derin Solmaz

== Episodes ==
No.	Title	Directed by	Written by	Original release date
1	"Demirbahçe"	Serdar Işık	Kerem Deren & Pınar Bulut	January 1, 2013
2	"Rumelihan"	Serdar Işık	Kerem Deren & Pınar Bulut	January 8, 2013
3	"Cellat Çeşmesi"	Serdar Işık	Kerem Deren & Pınar Bulut	January 15, 2013
4	"Kanlı Kuyu"	Serdar Işık	Kerem Deren & Pınar Bulut	January 22, 2013
5	"Cihangir Camii"	Serdar Işık	Kerem Deren & Pınar Bulut	January 29, 2013
6	"Vefa"	Ali Bilgin	Kerem Deren & Pınar Bulut	February 5, 2013
7	"Nika"	Ali Bilgin	Kerem Deren & Pınar Bulut	February 12, 2013
8	"Kağıthane"	Ali Bilgin	Kerem Deren & Pınar Bulut	February 19, 2013
9	"Mihrimah Sultan Camii"	Ali Bilgin	Kerem Deren & Pınar Bulut	February 26, 2013
10	"Sevda Tepesi"	Ali Bilgin	Kerem Deren & Pınar Bulut	March 5, 2013
11	"Tophane"	Ali Bilgin	Kerem Deren & Pınar Bulut	March 12, 2013
12	"Kanlı Çınar"	Ali Bilgin	Kerem Deren & Pınar Bulut	March 19, 2013
13	"Kız Kulesi"	Ali Bilgin	Kerem Deren & Pınar Bulut	April 2, 2013
14	"Can Feda"	Ali Bilgin	Kerem Deren & Pınar Bulut	April 9, 2013
15	"Yıldız Sarayı"	Ali Bilgin	Kerem Deren & Pınar Bulut	April 16, 2013
16	"Feriye Sarayı"	Ali Bilgin	Kerem Deren & Pınar Bulut	April 23, 2013
17	"Sahrayıcedid"	Ali Bilgin	Kerem Deren & Pınar Bulut	April 30, 2013
18	"Esma Sultan Yalısı"	Ali Bilgin	Kerem Deren & Pınar Bulut	May 7, 2013
19	"Vaniköy"	Ali Bilgin	Kerem Deren & Pınar Bulut	May 16, 2013
20	"Kırmızı Yalı"	Ali Bilgin	Kerem Deren & Pınar Bulut	May 23, 2013
21	"Agora Meyhanesi"	Ali Bilgin	Kerem Deren & Pınar Bulut	May 30, 2013
22	"Eskihisar"	Ali Bilgin	Kerem Deren & Pınar Bulut	June 6, 2013
23	"Bursa"	Ali Bilgin	Kerem Deren & Pınar Bulut	June 13, 2013
24	"Galata Köprüsü"	Ali Bilgin	Kerem Deren & Pınar Bulut	June 20, 2013
25	"İstanbul"	Ali Bilgin	Kerem Deren & Pınar Bulut	June 27, 2013

== Awards ==
Year	Prize	Category	Recipient	Status
2013	Antalya Television Awards	The Best Drama Actor	İlker Aksum	Nominated
2013	Antalya Television Awards	The Best Drama Supporting Actress	İpek Bilgin	Nominated
2013	Antalya Television Awards	The Best Drama Director	Ali Bilgin	Nominated
2013	Antalya Television Awards	The Best TV Series Camera Director	Barış Işık	Nominated
2013	KARVAK	The Best Actress	Tuba Büyüküstün	Won
2013	KARVAK	The Best Year Series	20 Dakika	Won
2013	Seoul International Drama Awards	The Best Drama Series	20 Dakika	Nominated
2014	International Emmy Awards	Best Performance by an Actress	Tuba Büyüküstün	Nominated

== International broadcast ==
Country	Local name	Network(s)	Series premiere
Northern Cyprus	20 Dakika	Star TV	January 1, 2013
Hungary	Egy Ellopott Élet	Super TV2	July 22, 2013
Russia	20 минут	9 Channel (Krasnodar)	August 4, 2013
Arab World	20 دقيقة	MBC 1	August 21, 2013
Iran	20 Daqiqa	Nex1	October, 2013
Sweden	20 Minuter	SVT	January 13, 2014
Mongolia	20 минут	TV9	January, 2014
Pakistan	20 Minute	Express Entertainment	2014
Romania	20 de minute	Euforia Lifestyle TV	2015
Ethiopia	20 ደቂቃ	Kana TV	March 18, 2017
Uganda		Top TV	2023
South Africa	Net 20 minute	eExtra	August 28, 2024

== See also ==
- Television in Turkey
- List of Turkish television series
- Turkish television drama
