= Akkoyun =

Akkoyun (a Turkish word meaning "white sheep") may refer to:

== People with the surname ==
- Fırat Akkoyun, Turkish footballer

== Places ==
- Akkoyunlu, Başmakçı, a village in Afyonkarahisar Province, Turkey
- Akkoyunlu, Çobanlar, a village in Afyonkarahisar Province, Turkey

== See also ==
- Ak Koyunlu, Oghuz Turkic tribal federation
