= Ceyda Ateş =

Turkish actress (born 1988)

- Born: 14 October 1988 (age 37); Ankara, Turkey
- Occupation: Actress
- Years active: 1993–present

Ceyda Ateş (born 14 October 1988 Ankara) is a Turkish actress.

She began acting at the age of five. She won a child beauty contest organized by Neşe Erberk. Since childhood, she played in numerous hit series.. She took acting lessons at the Barış Manço Cultural Centre. She presented the show 'Dizi Magazin' on Cine5.

Her first popular adult roles are Leyla in Kavak Yelleri adaptation of Dawson's Creek and hit period series "Elveda Rumeli". She acted as Hande in Adını Feriha Koydum. She played in "Yılanların Öcü" based from novel. With Engin Altan Düzyatan, she played in mini historical series Çırağan Baskını. She played in series "Evlerden Biri" based on novel.

== Filmography ==
Cinema
Year	Title	Role	Note
2006	Gülcü Baba	Gülcan	Leading role (TV film)
2007	Kabuslar Evi: Bir Kış Masalı		Supporting role
2007	Çılgın Dersane Kampta	Esra	Supporting role
2013	Hasret Bitti	Duru	Leading role
2013	Aşk Ağlatır	Lale	Leading role
2014	Gulyabani	Duygu	Leading role
2015	Adana İşi	Zeynep	Leading role
2016	Sol Şerit	Rüya	Leading role
2022	Sevmedim Deme		Leading role
2023	Düşeş: Mafya Sızıntısı		Leading role
Upcoming	Son Dilek	Deniz	Leading role
Web Series
Year	Title	Role	Note
2014	Çırağan Baskını	Elektra / Meryem	
Upcoming	Şebeke	Çiğdem	
TV series
Year	Title	Role	Note
1995	Çiçek Taksi	Aslı	Guest
1998	Erguvan Yılları		Guest
1999	Hayat Bağları	Sude	Guest
2000	Küçük İbo	Elmas	Supporting role
2000	Üvey Baba	Hatice	Guest
2001	Tatlı Hayat	Elena Gül	Guest
2001	Dünya Varmış	Yeliz	Guest
2002	Yarım Elma	Beren	Guest
2002	Bulutbey		Guest
2003	Gurbet Kadını	Merve	Supporting role
2004	Gizli Dünyalar		Guest
2004	Cennet Mahallesi	Dicle	Guest
2004	Büyük Buluşma		Guest
2005	Beşinci Boyut	Gökçe	Guest
2005	Aşk Oyunu	Feride	Supporting role
2006	Karagümrük Yanıyor	Petek	Supporting role
2006	Ahh İstanbul		Guest
2007	Yalan Dünya	Yeliz	Guest
2008	Hayat Güzeldir	Pınar Bahtiyar	Supporting role
2008	Doludizgin Yıllar	Pelin	Guest
2009	Kavak Yelleri	Leyla	Supporting role
2009	Elveda Rumeli	Pembe	Supporting role
2010	Yer Gök Aşk	Betül	Guest
2011	Adını Feriha Koydum/ Emir'in Yolu	Hande Gezgin	Supporting role
2012	Evlerden Biri	Nursen	Leading role
2013	Firuze	Suzan	Leading role
2013	Böyle Bitmesin	Derya	Guest
2013	Bir Yastıkta		Guest
2014	Tanıklar		Guest
2014	Yılanların Öcü	Zahide	Leading role
2015	Tutar mı Tutar	Süreyya	Leading role
2015	Gamsız Hayat	Ela	Leading role
2016	O Hayat Benim	Cemre	Supporting role
2019–2020	Çocuk	Şule Karasu	Leading role
