= İsmail Hakkı Sunat =

Turkish actor

- Born: 1966; Adıyaman, Turkey
- Died: 14 July 2004 (aged 37); Gelibolu, Turkey
- Spouse: Deniz Uğur (m. 1997)

İsmail Hakkı Sunat (17 October 1966 – 14 July 2004) was a Turkish theater, cinema and television actor.

İsmail Hakkı Sunat, artist of Ankara State Theater's General Directorate, took part in many theater plays. The artist, who moved from Ankara to the Istanbul State Theater, also starred in commercials, TV series and a movie. Sunat, who was married to Deniz Uğur and has a child, also worked in the search and rescue team working in the earthquake of 17 August 1999. The artist, who was killed by shooting with a gun, was shown as "one of the theater hopes of the future". He was buried in Gallipoli.

== Theatre ==
- King Lear
- Between the Riot
- Bandits
- Comedy in the Dark
- In the Moonlight

== Television ==
- Zümrüt – 2004
- Benimle Evlenir misin? – 2001
- Mert Ali – 2000
- Ateş Dansı – 1998
- Kördüğüm – 1997
- Gamsızlar – 1993

== Awards ==
- 2003 Afife Jale Awards, Between Legends game, "Most Successful Supporting Actor of the Year" award.
