= Reha Muhtar =

Turkish media person (1959–2026)

- Born: 21 July 1959; Istanbul, Turkey
- Died: 3 June 2026 (aged 66); Bodrum, Muğla Province, Turkey
- Education: TED Ankara Koleji
- Occupations: Anchorman; columnist; television reporter
- Spouse: Selin Çağlayan (m. 1983; div. 1988)
- Partner: Deniz Uğur (2008–2010)
- Children: Three (two with Uğur and one daughter with Nilüfer)

Reha Muhtar (21 July 1959 – 3 June 2026) was a Turkish anchorman, columnist and television reporter.

== Life and career ==
Muhtar was first seen on television as TRT's reporter from Istanbul, Turkey. Later he started hosting a debate program at show tv "Ateş Hattı" channel. Later, on the private channel Show TV as an anchorman, he gained national fame. His chaotic, no-holds-barred news making, remarks and most importantly the bizarre questions he asked his guests made him a phenomenon in Turkey. He was also famous for his pumpkin argument with news audiences on Show TV.

He hosted a talk show on Show TV with other Turkish celebrities Hülya Avşar, he worked as a columnist for a Turkish newspaper, Vatan.

In 1983, he married journalist Selin Çağlayan and their marriage lasted for five years.

In 2001, he started a relationship with Nilüfer. In 2003, the two announced their separation in a press release. Between 2006 and 2007 his relationship with Gülşen made his name appear frequently in the media. In 2008, he started a relationship with Deniz Uğur which ended in 2010.

Muhtar adopted a daughter with Nilüfer. He also had twins with Deniz Uğur in 2009. Muhtar died from heart failure in Bodrum, on 3 June 2026, at the age of 66. One day later, he was buried at Yeniköy Cemetery in Istanbul.
