= Gulyabani =

- Directed by: Orçun Benli
- Written by: Orçun Benli; Alptekin Öztürk
- Produced by: İrfan Tözüm
- Starring: Deniz Uğur; Ceyda Ateş; Melike Öcalan; Didem Balçın; Cüneyt Arkın; Perihan Savaş; Mustafa Üstündağ; Kenan Ece
- Cinematography: Vedat Özdemir
- Edited by: Okan Sarul
- Music by: Ete Kurttekin
- Production company: Muhteşem Film
- Distributed by: UIP Turkey
- Release date: February 28, 2014 (Turkey)
- Running time: 86 minutes
- Country: Turkey
- Language: Turkish

Gulyabani is a 2014 Turkish horror-comedy film directed by Orçun Benli. According to Turkish myth, Gulyabani is a humongous ghoul with a long beard who wanders at night and scares people.
