= Adını Feriha Koydum =

2011 Turkish television series

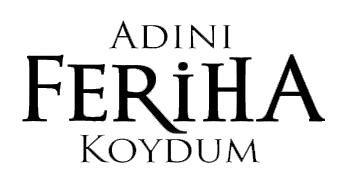
- Genre: Drama; Romance
- Written by: Melis Civelek; Sırma Yanık
- Directed by: Barış Yöş
- Starring: Hazal Kaya; Vahide Perçin; Çağatay Ulusoy; Metin Çekmez; Deniz Ugur; Ceyda Ateş
- Theme music composer: Nail Yurtsever; Cem Tuncer
- Country of origin: Turkey
- Original language: Turkish
- No. of seasons: 3
- No. of episodes: 80

Production
- Producer: Fatih Aksoy
- Editor: Engin Ozturk
- Running time: 120 minutes
- Production company: Med Yapım

Original release
- Network: Show TV
- Release: 14 January 2011 – 14 December 2012

I Named her Feriha (Turkish: Adını Feriha Koydum) is a Turkish television drama series which was first broadcast on Show TV from 14 January 2011 to 29 June 2012. A final season named Adını Feriha Koydum: Emir'in Yolu(Feriha: Emir's way) aired from 7 September to 14 December 2012 out of which 8 episodes are linked with previous season storyline and subsequently by removing characters which are linked with Feriha character the series of rest episodes are became spin-off version of the series. It follows housekeeper Feriha Yilmaz (Hazal Kaya), a young woman from a poor background and the daughter of Zehra Yılmaz (Vahide Percin); and Rıza Yılmaz (Metin Çekmez), a doorman. Feriha is awarded a scholarship to an elite university, where wealthy playboy Emir Sarrafoğlu (Cagatay Ulusoy) studies as well. Emir eventually falls in love with Feriha, believing she is also wealthy. The series was written by Melis Civelek and Sırma Yanık and produced by Med Yapım.

The series was very popular among younger viewers. The first two seasons of the show were very successful all over the world. The third and final season, titled Adını Feriha Koydum: Emir'in You, which was broadcast from 7 September to 14 December 2012 was not as successful and ended its run after 13 episodes. The series has been exported to over 70 countries. It was Ulusoy's first acting role, after playing an extra in the Turkish series Arka Sokaklar and Recep Ivedik 3.

== Themes and reception ==
According to Nilüfer Pembecioğlu, Feriha is a symbol of class anxiety in Turkey; though having a university education, she is forced to lie in order to get ahead. Pembecioğlu includes it among the most successful Turkish television serials being shown around the world; it was especially popular in Bulgaria, and was aired in Russia, Bangladesh, India and Pakistan. In Pakistan, it aired on Urdu 1 dubbed in Urdu, the national language of Pakistan. In India, it was dubbed in Hindi and broadcast on Zindagi which is owned by ZEEL. In Bangladesh, it was dubbed in Bangla and aired on Deepto TV from 13 November 2020.

Due to demand, the show has been rerun on the same network since 12 May 2016. The third and final season, Adını Feriha Koydum: Emir'in Yolu, which until then hadn't been shown in India, was broadcast for the first time from 16 November to 15 December 2016 under the title "Feriha-New Season" by Zindagi.

== Series overview ==
The series was revived in the 3rd season under the title of Adını Feriha Koydum: Emir'in Yolu from episode 68 to 72. From the 73rd episode onwards, the show was broadcast only with the name Emir'in Yolu in Turkey.

Season	Episodes	First aired	Last aired	Episode span	TV channel
1	24	14 January 2011	24 June 2011	1–24	Show TV
2	43	9 September 2011	29 June 2012	25–67	Show TV
3	13	7 September 2012	14 December 2012	68–80	Show TV

== Plot ==
=== Season 1 ===
Feriha Yılmaz (Hazal Kaya) is an attractive, beautiful, talented, and ambitious girl from a very poor family. Her father, Rıza Yılmaz (Metin Çekmez), is a doorman in Etiler, an upper-class neighborhood of Istanbul. Her mother, Zehra Yılmaz (Vahide Perçin), is a housekeeper. Because of her intelligence, Feriha is awarded a full scholarship to attend a private university. She wears her neighbor's lavish clothes, trying to look wealthy. There, she meets a handsome and wealthy young man, Emir Sarrafoğlu (Çağatay Ulusoy), who is known for being a womanizer. Feriha lies about her life due to the fear of being rejected. She and Emir, with passing time and favorable circumstances, fall in love with each other. However, as that love grows, she becomes trapped in her own lies.

=== Season 2 ===
Emir's friend Hande Gezgin (Ceyda Ateş) has a crush on Emir, while Emir's close male friend Koray Onat falls for Hande. Feriha learns that Günce is pregnant by Koray and decides to help them by taking up her abortion. Due to a misunderstanding, Feriha divorces Emir in his absence and moves with Levent to the US for 3 years. Emir was engaged to Ece to protect her from Yavuz Sancaktar, until the problem gets solved and Feriha and Emir remarry. However, two rounds of shots are fired by Halil and Feriha is shot by him and she dies in Emir's arms.

=== Season 3 ===
Emir (Cagatay Ulusoy) deals with the grief of Feriha's death. Feriha's beautiful cousin Zulal Yilmaz falls in love with Emir. Later, Yavuz Sanchakter's sister Gunes also falls for Emir. At the end of the season Aysun slapped Sanem and Emir goes to Yavuz Sanchakter to sort out things.

== Cast ==
Role	Actor
Feriha Yılmaz/Feriha Sarrafoğlu, Lead Protagonist	Hazal Kaya
Emir Sarrafoğlu, Lead Protagonist	Çağatay Ulusoy
Zehra Yılmaz, Lead Protagonist	Vahide Perçin
Rıza Yılmaz	Metin Çekmez
Sanem İlhanlı	Deniz Uğur
Hande Gezgin	Ceyda Ateş
Koray Onat	Yusuf Akgün
Mehmet Yılmaz	Melih Selçuk
Cansu İlhanlı	Sedef Şahin
Halil	Ufuk Tan Altunkaya
Ünal Sarrafoğlu	Eray Özbay, Murat Onuk
Seher Yılmaz	Neşem Akhan
Levent Seymen	Barış Kılıç
Lara Atabey	Feyza Civelek
Tülin Atabey	Ebru Unurtan, Çiğdem İrtem
Günce	Gülşah Fırıncıoğlu
Aysun Sarrafoğlu	Ahu Sungur
Ömer Yılmaz	Artun Çağlar
Rüya	Tuğba Melis Türk
Gülsüm Karaman/Onat	Pelin Ermiş
Ece Şahin	Yağmur Tanrısevsin
Haldun İlhanlı	Özhan Carda
Orhan	Cihan Okan
İlker	Harun Akyüz
Sophie Zehra	Leyla Erdoğan
Rümeysa	Esin Eden
Yavuz Sancaktar	Emre Koç
Hatice Karaman	Ayşegül Uyguner
Hassan, Zehra's first love interest	Aytaç Arman
Zulal Yilzam	Beril Kayar
Gülfidan	Birgül Ulusoy
Nevbahar Seymen	Nurinisa Yıldırım
Bülent Seymen	Sarp Can Köroğlu

== International broadcasting ==
Country	Show name	TV channel	Premiere date
Bangladesh	ফেরিহা Feriha	Deepto TV	13 November 2020
Arab World	أسميتها فريحة; Asmeituha Fariha	Abu Dhabi Al Oula	3 November 2012
Bulgaria	Огледален свят Ogledalen svyat	exclusive on Voyo.bg bTV	2 July 2012
Pakistan	فریحہ; Feriha	Urdu 1	27 April 2013
Romania	Feriha	Kanal D	19 October 2013
Ethiopia	ፈሪሀ Feriha	Kana TV	7 February 2018
Croatia	Djevojka imena Feriha	Nova TV	15 July 2013
Bosnia and Herzegovina	Djevojka imena Feriha	OBN BN	7 October 2013
Afghanistan	فريحه; Feriha	Tolo TV	2014
Slovakia	Feriha	TV Doma	18 August 2014
Iran	Feriha	Farsi 1	23 August 2014
Ukraine	Сила кохання Феріхи	1+1	26 January 2015
Kazakhstan	Ферихa - Feriha	Astana TV	4 February 2015
Serbia	Zvala se Feriha	Prva	31 May 2015
Montenegro	Zvala se Feriha	Prva	8 June 2015
India	Feriha	Zindagi (TV channel)	15 September 2015
Peru	El Secreto de Feriha	Latina Televisión	7 December 2015
Uruguay	El Secreto de Feriha	Monte Carlo TV	5 January 2016
Colombia	El Secreto de Feriha	Caracol Televisión	14 March 2016
Lithuania	Turtuolé vargšė	LNK	30 June 2016
Chile	El Secreto de Feriha	Mega	7 November 2016
Puerto Rico	El Secreto de Feriha	Wapa	7 November 2016
Argentina	El Secreto de Feriha	Telefe	12 December 2016
Slovenia	Dekle z imenom Feriha	POP TV	2019
South Africa	The Girl Named Feriha	eBella	2019
Sri Lanka	රූමා /Rooma	Hiru TV	2021
Israel	נערה ושמה פריהא	Israel's Turkish Drama Channel (ערוץ הים תיכוני+)	17 November 2021
Mozambique	Uma Rapariga chamada Feriha	Maningue Magic	2022
