= İstanbullu Gelin =

Turkish TV series

- Based on: Hayata Dön by Gülseren Budayıcıoğlu
- Directed by: Zeynep Günay Tan; Deniz Koloş
- Starring: Özcan Deniz; Aslı Enver; İpek Bilgin
- Country of origin: Turkey
- Original language: Turkish
- No. of seasons: 3
- No. of episodes: 87

Production
- Producer: Cengiz Çağatay
- Running time: 120 minutes

Original release
- Network: Star TV
- Release: March 3, 2017 – May 31, 2019

İstanbullu Gelin (Bride of Istanbul) is a 2017 Turkish television series signed by O3 Medya. The first episode was broadcast on March 3, 2017, directed by Zeynep Günay Tan and Deniz Koloş. The final episode aired on May 31, 2019. It is adapted from Dr. Gülseren Budayıcıoğlu's book Hayata Dön (Return to Life). Also, Many episodes of "Kırmızı Oda" series is based on book Hayata Dön. Melisa Sözen and Ahsen Eroğlu played same character, as Alya in Kırmızı Oda and as Yaz in İstanbullu Gelin.

== Plot ==
Süreyya, a young and beautiful but financially strapped singer, is courted by Faruk Boran, the eldest son of the Boran family, which has deep roots in Bursa, a historically important city in Turkey. The Boran family, one of the most prominent and successful in Bursa, is in the transportation industry. Faruk's mother, the matriarch of the family, wants Faruk to marry Ipek, the daughter of a friend of the family, and a clash of wills between the two ensues. Many family secrets come tumbling out.

In the second season, the Boran family lose their home, their inheritance and are faced with the struggles of accepting their modest lifestyle.

In the third season, they are going to face Adem and take back what is theirs. Adem's wife, Dilara, gives birth to their son Umut. Adem and Dilara divorce from one another, and he gets into a relationship with someone named Gunes. He'd originally wanted Dilara back, but she gets into a happy relationship with someone else named Mert, and he'd already fallen for Gunes.

Esma dies of Alzheimer's, and, despite such heartbreak, everyone lives happily ever after.

== Cast ==
| Actress/Actor | Character/Role | Episodes |
|---|---|---|
| Özcan Deniz | Faruk Boran | 1-87 |
| Aslı Enver | Süreyya Boran | 1-87 |
| İpek Bilgin | Esma Boran/Selimer | 1-87 |
| Salih Bademci | Fikret Boran | 1-87 |
| Dilara Aksüyek | İpek Boran | 1-87 |
| Güven Murat Akpınar | Osman Boran | 1-87 |
| Fırat Tanış | Adem Sezgin/Boran | 1-87 |
| Özge Borak | Begüm Bakir | 4-37 |
| Neslihan Arslan | Dilara Sezgin/Boran | 1-87 |
| Berkay Hardal | Murat Boran | 1-48 |
| Nergis Çorakçı | Kıymet | 1-87 |
| Hakan Altıner | Şahap | 1-87 |
| Neslihan Yeldan | Senem Tezcan | 1-87 |
| Pelinsu Pir | Nurgül | 1-87 |
| Hayal Köseoğlu | Zeynep Gürsoy | |
| Semra Dinçer | Reyhan Sezgin | 1-52 |
| Fatih Koyunoğlu | Akif Tezcan | 1-87 |
| Ahmet Sabri Özmener | Mustafa | 1-87 |
| Eren Balkan | Gülistan | 1-87 |
| Muharrem Türkseven | Nazif | 1-87 |
| Nilay Erdönmez | Asiye | 1-17 |
| Hira Koyuncuoğlu | Bade Boran | 1-48 |
| Tamer Levent | Garip Selimer | 18-87 |
| Ebru Şahin | Burcu Selimer/Boran | 17-50 |
| Elena Viunova | Anastasia | 63-86 |

== Broadcast Schedule ==
| Season | Screening day and time | Season Start | Season Finale | Number of episodes captured | Division range | Season year | TV Channel |
|---|---|---|---|---|---|---|---|
| 1. Season | Friday 20.00 | 3 March 2017 | 16 June 2017 | 16 | 1 - 16 | 2017 | Star TV |
| 2. Season | Friday 20.00 | 22 September 2017 | 8 June 2018 | 37 | 17 - 53 | 2017 - 2018 | Star TV |
| 3. Season | Friday 20.00 | 21 September 2018 | 31 May 2019 (Finale) | 34 | 54 - 87 | 2018 - 2019 | Star TV |

== Remakes ==
| Country | Original title | English title | Release date | Note |
|---|---|---|---|---|
| Lebanon | عروس بيروت | Bride of Beirut | 2019 | |
| India | Hum Rahe Na Rahe Hum | We Are or We Are Not | 2023 | |
| Mexico | Eternamente Amándonos | Eternally Loving Us | 2023 | |

== Accolades ==
| Year | Award | Category | Nomination | Result |
|---|---|---|---|---|
| 2018 | 46th International Emmy Awards | Best Telenovela | İstanbullu Gelin | Nominated |

== See also ==
- List of programs broadcast by Star TV
