= List of programs broadcast by Star TV =

List of programs broadcast by Star TV, a Turkish nationwide TV channel owned by Ferit Şahenk from Doğuş Media Group since 2011.

== Current programming ==
=== Series ===
- 2021–: Sana Söz Salı 20.00 Yapim 03 Medya
- 2021–: Kaderimin Oyunu Cuma 20.00 Yapim Ngm Television
- 2021–: Annemizi Saklarken Çarşamba 20.00 Yapim Ojo Pictures
- 2021–: Hanedan Pazartesi 20.00 Yapim Ay Yapim
- 2021–: Cennet Köyü Pazar 20.00 Yapim 03 Medya
- 2021–: Masum ve Güzel 16 Aralık Perşembe Yapim Nyc Medya
- 2021–: Kral Kaybederse 18 Aralık Cumartesi Yapim Ogm Pictures

=== Life style ===
- 2012–: Tülin Şahin'le Moda (Tülin Şahin)
- 2015–: Vahe ile Evdeki Mutluluk (Vahe Kılıçarslan)
- 2016–: Özlem Denizmen'le Kadınca
- 2017–: Mesut Yar Sunar (Mesut Yar)
- 2019–: Kocam Yaparsa
- 2019–: Nursel'in Konukları
- 2021–: Haluk Levent'le Yeniden

=== Magazine ===
- 2014–: Star Life
- 2013–: En güzel bölüm

=== News ===
- 1989–: Ece Belen Atrek ile Yaz Haberleri (Ece Belen Atrek)
- 1989–: Star Ana Haber (Nazlı Çelik Bilgili)

== Former programming ==
=== Series ===
==== 1991–1995 ====
- Yadigar
- 1991–1992: Ana
- 1991: Kimse Durduramaz
- 1991: Karışık İş
- 1991: Karşı Show
- 1991: Kahraman Damat
- 1991: Portatif Hüseyin
- 1991: Şen Dullar
- 1992: Taşların Sırrı
- 1992: Kızlar Yurdu
- 1992: Savcı
- 1992: Saygılar Bizden
- 1993: Şaban Askerde
- 1994–1998: Yazlıkçılar
- 1994: Sevgi Oyunu
- 1994–1995: Bay Kamber
- 1994–1999: Bizimkiler
- 1995: Aşk Fırtınası
- 1995: Fırıldak Nuri
- 1995: Aşık Oldum
- 1995: Aşk ve Gurur
- 1995: Evdekiler
- 1995: Gül ve Diken
- 1995: Gölge Çiçeği
- 1995: Kanundan Kaçılmaz / İz Peşinde
- 1995: Kaygısızlar
- 1995: Kopgel Taksi
- 1995: Muhteşem Zango
- 1995–1997: Şehnaz Tango
- 1995–1999: Ferhunde Hanımlar

==== 1996–2000 ====
- 1996: Çılgın Badiler
- 1996: Komşu Komşu
- 1996: Şeytanın Kurbanları
- 1996: Oğlum Adam Olacak
- 1996: Sihirli Ceket
- 1996: Süper Yıldız
- 1996: Tam Pansiyon
- 1996: Tutku
- 1996: Zühre
- 1996–1997: Fırtınalar
- 1996–1997: Gözlerinde Son Gece
- 1997: Acı Günler
- 1997: Baskül Ailesi
- 1997: Canısı
- 1997: Devlerin Aşkı
- 1997–1998: Fırat
- 1997: İntizar
- 1997: Köstebek
- 1997: Oyun Bitti
- 1997: Yangın Ayşe
- 1997–1998: Yerim Seni
- 1997–1998: Deli Divane
- 1997–1998: Sırtımdan Vuruldum
- 1997–2000: Kara Melek
- 1998: Can ile Muhlise
- 1998: Çarli
- 1998: Dış Kapının Mandalları
- 1998: Feride
- 1998: Gülüm
- 1998: Hain Geceler
- 1998: Hesabım Bitmedi
- 1998: Hicran
- 1998: Kaygısızlar
- 1998: Kızım Osman
- 1998: Mercan Kolye
- 1998: Sır Dosyası
- 1998–1999: Kuzgun
- 1998–1999: Güzel Günler
- 1998–1999: Reyting Hamdi
- 1998–1999: Sen Allah'ın Bir
- 1998–1999: Yıkılmadım
- 1998–2001: Aynalı Tahir
- 1998–2003: Üvey Baba
- 1999: Affet Beni
- 1999: Bizim Sokak
- 1999: Güneş Yanıkları
- 1999: Kadınlar Kulübü
- 1999: Zilyoner
- 1999: Küçük Besleme
- 1999–2004: Bücür Cadı
- 1999–2000: Kıvılcım
- 2000: Aşk Hırsızı
- 2000: Birisi / Her Şey Yalan
- 2000: Hanım Ağa
- 2000: Kızım ve Ben
- 2000: Koltuk Sevdası
- 2000: Kör Talih
- 2000: Süper Kurşunsuz
- 2000: Mercan Kolye
- 2000: Renkli Dünyalar

==== 2001–2005 ====
- 2001: Küçük Besleme
- 2001: Aylin
- 2001: Babam ve Biz
- 2001–2002: Sultan
- 2001: Tuzu Kurular
- 2002: Kara Melek
- 2002: Ah Yaşamak Var ya
- 2002: Asayiş Berkemal
- 2002: Aşk ve Gurur
- 2002: Beşik Kertmesi
- 2002: Bizimkiler
- 2002: Cabbar
- 2002: Çatıdaki Kız
- 2002: Aşkın Peşinde
- 2002: Dadı
- 2002: Efsane
- 2002: Emanet
- 2002: Kader Ayırsa Bile
- 2002: Kibar Ana
- 2002: Mahallenin Muhtarları
- 2002: Teyzemin Nesi Var
- 2002: Vaka-i Zaptiye
- 2003: Bir Yıldız Tutuldu
- 2003: Şıhsenem
- 2003: Umutların Ötesi
- 2003: Zalim
- 2003: Hürrem Sultan
- 2003–2004: Ayrılsak da Beraberiz
- 2003–2004: Çocuklar Duymasın
- 2003–2006: En Son Babalar Duyar
- 2004: 24 Saat
- 2004: Biz Boşanıyoruz
- 2004: Her Şey Yolunda
- 2004: Tatil Aşkları
- 2004: Yeni Hayat
- 2004–2005: Çocuklar Ne Olacak
- 2004–2005: Kadın İsterse
- 2004–2005: Sırlara Yolculuk
- 2004–2005: Şöhretler Kebapçısı
- 2005: AB'nin Yolları Taştan
- 2005: Alanya Almanya
- 2005: Canın Sağolsun
- 2005: Erkek Tarafı
- 2005: Kayıt Dışı
- 2005: Kısmet Değilmiş
- 2005: Kızma Birader
- 2005: Sen misin Değil misin
- 2005: Yeniden Çalıkuşu

==== 2006–2010 ====
- 2006: İmkansız Aşk
- 2006: Karagümrük Yanıyor
- 2006: Taşların Sırrı
- 2006: Ümit Milli
- 2006–2007: Candan Öte
- 2006–2007: Kaybolan Yıllar
- 2006–2007: Yalancı Yarim
- 2006–2008: İki Aile
- 2006–2008: Köprü
- 2006: Sihirli Annem (Kanal D)
- 2007: Acemi Cadı (Kanal D.)
- 2007: Kader
- 2007: Sevgili Dünürüm
- 2007: Ters Yüz
- 2007: Zeliha'nın Gözleri
- 2007: Leylan
- 2007–2008: Çemberin Dışında (TV Show)
- 2007–2008: Fedai
- 2007–2009: Vazgeç Gönlüm
- 2008: Kalpsiz Adam
- 2008: Milyonda Bir
- 2008: Derdest
- 2008: Pulsar
- 2008: Son Ağa
- 2008–2009: Ay Işığı
- 2008–2009: Baba Ocağı
- 2008–2009: Son Bahar
- 2008–2009: Güldünya
- 2009: Aile Reisi
- 2009: Teyzanne
- 2009: İstanbul'un Çocukları
- 2009–2010: İhanet
- 2009: Kayıp Prenses
- 2009: Kül ve Ateş
- 2009: Yol Arkadaşım
- 2009–2010: Benim Annem Bir Melek
- 2009–2010: Kurtlar Vadisi Pusu
- 2009–2010: Makber
- 2009–2010: Maskeli Balo
- 2009–2011: Papatyam
- 2010: Cümbür Cemaat Aile
- 2010: Umut Yolcuları
- 2010–2011: Dürüye'nin Güğümleri
- 2010–2011: Geniş Aile
- 2010–2011: Küçük Kadınlar
- 2010–2011: Küçük Sırlar
- 2010–2013: Behzat Ç. Bir Ankara Polisiyesi

==== 2011 ====
- 2011: Anneler ile Kızları
- 2011: Ay Tutulması
- 2011: Cennetin Sırları
- 2011: İzmir Çetesi
- 2011: Sırat
- 2011: Yalancı Bahar
- 2011–2012: Akasya Durağı
- 2011–2012: Sihirli Annem
- 2011–2012: Bir Ömür Yetmez
- 2011–2012: Firar
- 2011–2012: İffet
- 2011–2012: İkinci Bahar (1998–2001, atv)
- 2011–2012: Tek Başımıza

==== 2012 ====
- 2012: Acayip Hikayeler
- 2012: Ağır Roman Yeni Dünya
- 2012: Babalar ve Evlatlar
- 2012: Bir Çocuk Sevdim
- 2012: Canımın İçi
- 2012: Çıplak Gerçek
- 2012: Evlerden Biri
- 2012: Hayatımın Rolü
- 2012: İbreti Ailem
- 2012: Kalbim 4 Mevsim
- 2012: Koyu Kırmızı
- 2012: Küçük Hesaplar
- 2012: Sudan Bıkmış Balıklar
- 2012–2013: Bir Erkek Bir Kadın
- 2012–2013: Dila Hanım
- 2012–2013: İşler Güçler
- 2012–2014: Muhteşem Yüzyıl

==== 2013 ====
- 2013: 20 Dakika
- 2013: Benim Hala Umudum Var (FOX'a geçti.)
- 2013–2014: Ben de Özledim
- 2013–2015: Aramızda Kalsın
- 2013–2015: Aşkın Bedeli
- 2013–2015: Medcezir

==== 2014 ====
- 2014: Aşktan Kaçılmaz
- 2014: Kaçak Gelinler
- 2014: Kurt Seyit ve Şura
- 2014: Reaksiyon
- 2014: Sil Baştan
- 2014: Urfalıyam Ezelden
- 2014–2015: Deniz Yıldızı
- 2014–2015: Gönül İşleri
- 2014–2015: Güzel Köylü
- 2014–2015: Kaderimin Yazıldığı Gün
- 2014–2015: Kardeş Payı
- 2014–2017: Paramparça

==== 2015 ====
- 2015: Çilek Kokusu
- 2015: Serçe Sarayı
- 2015: Tatlı Küçük Yalancılar
- 2015–2016: Hatırla Gönül
- 2015–2016: Muhteşem Yüzyıl Kösem
- 2015–2017: Kiralık Aşk
- 2015–2017: Kara Sevda
- 2015 : Tatli Küçük Yalançilar

==== 2016 ====
- 2016: 46 Yok Olan
- 2016: Gecenin Kraliçesi
- 2016: Göç Zamanı
- 2016: Hanım Köylü
- 2016: Şahane Damat
- 2016: Yüksek Sosyete
- 2016–2017: Hayat Bazen Tatlıdır
- 2016–2017: Anne
- 2016–2017: Cesur ve Güzel

==== 2017 ====
- 2017: Ateşböceği
- 2017: Dolunay
- 2017: İçimdeki Fırtına
- 2017: Türk Malı
- 2017: Yıldızlar Şahidim
- 2017–2018: Fazilet Hanım Ve Kızları
- 2017–2018: Hayat Sırları
- 2017–2018: Siyah İnci
- 2017–2019: Söz
- 2017–2019: İstanbullu Gelin

==== 2018 ====
- 2018: Babamın Günahları
- 2018: Börü
- 2018: Kalbimin Sultanı
- 2018–2019: Erkenci Kuş
- 2018–Present: Avlu (“The Yard” On Netflix)

==== 2019 ====
- 2019: Kardeş Çocukları
- 2019: Kuzgun
- 2019: Sevgili Geçmiş
- 2019: Benim Tatlı Yalanım

==== 2020 ====
- 2020: Sol Yanım
- 2020: Menajerimi Ara

==== 2021 ====
- 2021: “Seni Çok Bekledim”
- 2021: “Kağıt Ev”
- 2021: "Kazara Aşk"
- 2021: "Benim Hayatim"
- 2021: "Ada Masali"

=== Other TV series ===
- 1990–1995: Kanun Namına (dizi) (TRT 1'den geldi.)
- 1990–1995: Kara Şimşek (TRT 1'den geldi.)
- 1990–1995: Macgyver (TRT 1'den geldi.)
- 1990–1995: A Takımı (Kanal 7')
- 1990–1992: Dallas (TRT 1, Show TV.)
- 1990–1995: Hanedan(Dynasty)
- Knots Landing (TRT 1, Show TV'i.)
- Hawaii Five-O (TRT 1'den geldi, Show TV'ye geçti.)
- San Fransisko Sokakları (TRT 1)
- 1990–1992: Ateş Çemberi
- 1990–1992: Aynadaki Yüz
- 1990–1992: Bütün Çocuklarım
- 1990–1992: Evli ve Çocuklu (atv)
- 1990–1992: Hastane Günlüğü
- 1990–1992: Uçak Gemisi
- 990–1995: Dynasty
- 1990–1995: Santa Barbara (TRT 1.)
- 1990–1998: Cesur ve Güzel (TV Show)
- 1991–1992: Beverly Hills, 90210 (Kanal D)
- -1996: Marimar
- 1998: Maria la del Barrio
- 2007–2008: Rosalinda (atv)
- 2009–2010: Büyük Kaçış (Original broadcast: CNBC-e
- 2010: 24 (Original broadcast: CNBC-e
- 2010–2011: Aşkın İki Yüzü
- 2011: Kalbimin Sahibi
- 2012: CSI: NY (Original broadcast: CNBC-e)
- 2012: Dallas (came from Elmax, switched to CNBC-e )
- 2012: Genç Kurt (Original broadcast: CNBC-e )
- 2012: Hayallerin Peşinde (e2)
- 2012: Merlin (Original broadcast: CNBC-e )
- 2012: Spartaküs: Arenanın İlahları (Original broadcast: CNBC-e )
- 2012: Spartaküs: İntikam (Original broadcast: CNBC-e )
- 2012: Spartaküs: Kan ve Kum (Original broadcast: CNBC-e )
- 2012: Taht Oyunları (Original Release: Cine5, Universal Channel and CNBC-e
- 2012–2013: Law & Order (original publication : 2012–present, CNBC-e )
- 2012–2013: Revolution (Orijinal yayın: 2012-günümüz, CNBC-e)
- 2012–2013: Sinbad
- 2013: Titanic

=== Cinema ===
- 1990–2012: Star TV Yabancı Film
- 2009: Star Sinema Kulübü
- 2012: Kült Türk Filmleri Kuşağı
- 2012: Star TV Düşler Sinem

=== Award ===
- 1995–2005: Kral TV Video Müzik Ödülleri
- 2006–2011: Altın Kelebek Ödülleri
- 2012: Kral TV Video Müzik Ödülleri
- 2013: Türkiye Müzik Ödülleri

=== Music-Entertainment ===
- 1991–1993: Laf Lafı Açıyor (TV Show)
- 1991–1994: Salı Pazarı (Defne Samyeli)
- 1994: Maksat Muhabbet (Kadir Çöpdemir)
- 1994–1996: İbo Show (İbrahim Tatlıses)
- 1998: Cumartesi Gecesi Ateşi (Şebnem Dönmez)
- 1998: Deniz Show (Özcan Deniz)
- 2000–2001: Beyaz Show (Beyazıt Öztürk)
- 2000–2003: İbo Show (İbrahim Tatlıses)
- 2001–2002: Denizkızı (Deniz Akkaya)
- 2002: Sibel Can – Ata Demirer Show (Sibel Can ve Ata Demirer)
- 2002: Tatlı ve Huysuz Show (Huysuz Virjin ve Sibel Can)
- 2004–2005: İbo Show (İbrahim Tatlıses)
- 2005–2006: Mesut Yar'la Tuhaf Şeyler (Mesut Yar)
- 2007–2009: Kliptonik (Kerem Özşeker)
- 2009–2010: İbo Show (İbrahim Tatlıses)
- 2010: Dr. Öz Show (Mehmet Öz)
- 2010: Petek'le 10 Numara (Petek Dinçöz)
- 2010–2011: Hayrettin (Hayrettin Karaoğuz)
- 2011: Bu Şarkı İkimizin (Deniz Seki ve Yavuz Bingöl)
- 2011: Matrax (Zeki Kayahan Coşkun)
- 2011: Pişti (Gani Müjde, Şafak Sezer, Özlem Tekin ve Sanem Altan)
- 2011: Yerden Göğe (Berna Laçin, Funda Özkalyoncuoğlu ve Rasim Ozan Kütahyalı)
- 2013–2014: 3 Adam (Eser Yenenler, Oğuzhan Koç ve İbrahim Büyükak)
- 2014–2016: Dada Dandinista (Okan Bayülgen)
