= Yağmur Tanrısevsin =

Turkish actress

- Born: 24 August 1990 (age 35); Mersin, Turkey
- Occupation(s): Actress, designer
- Years active: 2011–present
- Website: yagmurtanrisevsin.com

Yağmur Tanrısevsin is a Turkish actress and designer born on 24 August 1990.

== Career ==
Tanrısevsin is a graduate of Marmara University School of Fine Arts with a degree in ceramic-glass making. She continues her art career both in the fields of acting and ceramic-glass. She has taken acting classes from the likes of Meltem Cumbul, Betül Alganatay, Ümit Çırak, Bahar Kerimoglu and Merve Taşkan. She made her cinematic debut with the role of Jennifer in the English-language horror movie The Tragedy.

She had guest role in the series Pis Yedili. In 2011, she played in the series Adını Feriha Koydum as Ece. In 2013, she was cast in the movie Aşk Ağlatır. She continued her cinematic career with the film series Geniş Aile: Yapıştır in which she played the role Çağla and Yok Artık 2 as Damla. Tanrısevsin had her breakthrough with her role in Güneşi Beklerken, in which she portrayed "Melis Güzel", the sensitive daughter of a famous family who is going through an emotional crises. In 2014, she joined the cast of Kaçak, acting alongside Haluk Bilginer. She continued her career in television with roles in Bana Baba Dedi, Mayıs Kraliçesi and İki Yalancı series. In 2020, she played in the movie Baba Parası, which as of April 2021 is the 68th most-watched movie of all time in Turkey according to Box Office.

== Filmography ==
=== Films ===
Key
| † | Denotes films that have not yet been released |

| Year | Title | Role | Notes | Ref. |
|---|---|---|---|---|
| 2013 | The Tragedy | Jennifer | Turkish | |
| 2013 | Aşk Ağlatır | Banu | Turkish | |
| 2015 | Geniş Aile Yapıştır | Çağla | Turkish | |
| 2016 | Yok Artık! 2 | Damla | Turkish | |
| 2020 | Baba Parası | Tülin | Turkish | |
| TBA | Üçüncü Gün | Elya | Turkish | |

=== Television ===
| Year | Title | Role | Notes | Ref. |
|---|---|---|---|---|
| 2012 | Kalbim Seni Seçti | Secretary | (guest appearance) | |
| 2012 | Kalbim Seni Seçti | Müge | (guest appearance) | |
| 2012 | Adını Feriha Koydum | Ece | | |
| 2013-2014 | Güneşi Beklerken | Melis Güzel | | |
| 2014-2015 | Kaçak | Tülay Mengen | | |
| 2015 | Bana Baba Dedi | Didem | | |
| 2015–2016 | Mayıs Kraliçesi | Nehir | | |
| 2017 | İki Yalancı | Duygu | | |
| 2021 | Menajerimi Ara | Herself | | |
| 2021-2022 | Kalp Yarası | Ayşe Sancakzade /Yılmaz | Main Lead | |

== Awards and nominations ==
| Year | Award | Category | Work | Result | Ref |
|---|---|---|---|---|---|
| 2014 | 5th Ayaklı News Paper Television Awards | Best Supporting Actress in a Teen Drama | Güneşi Beklerken | Won | |
