= Gülseren Budayıcıoğlu =

Turkish psychiatrist and writer

- Born: Gülseren Kavas; 1947 (age 78–79); Ankara, Turkey
- Education: Ankara University; Hacettepe University
- Occupation: Psychiatrist · writer · TV presenter
- Years active: 1965–present (as TV presenter); 1977–present (as psychiatrist); 2004–present (as writer)
- Television: TRT; TV8
- Spouse: Aydın Budayıcıoğlu (m. 1973; died 2007)
- Website: madalyonklinik.com

Gülseren Budayıcıoğlu (née Kavas; born 1947) is a Turkish psychiatrist, writer and TV presenter.

Although she has written about many different subjects, in recent years she has become known for her novels which have been adapted to various TV series, including İstanbullu Gelin (2017–19), Doğduğun Ev Kaderindir (2019–21), Kırmızı Oda (2020–22), Masumlar Apartmanı (2020–22), Camdaki Kız (2021–2023), Terzi, Kral Kaybederse and Kardeş. and Yalı Çapkını (2022-2025).

== Life ==
Budayıcıoğlu was born in 1947 in Ankara. By her own definition, she is the daughter of a "loving" father and a "self-sacrificing, authoritarian" mother. She has two younger siblings named Yükselen and Mustafa. She completed her secondary and high school education at TED Ankara College and her undergraduate education at Ankara University Medical School.

The years of her undergraduate studies coincided with the years when TRT started operating. In this process, she took the TV presenting test offered by TRT, and started to work as a presenter in TRT television in 1965. She was nicknamed "Miss TRT" by her school friends and teachers. Budayıcıoğlu graduated from university in September 1972, and during this period she faced pressure to choose a career path as either a TV presenter or a doctor. At the end of the same year, she quit her job as a TV presenter in November, and started to work as an assistant at the university by December. However, her tenure as an assistant did not last long. While working as an assistant, she had to obtain legal permission to appear on TV. The dean of the university where she worked, Prof. Dr. Rıdvan, who had the authority to grant this permission, declared in January 1973 that it was not possible to give such permission to assistants. In the same month, during the holidays, Budayıcıoğlu presented two programs on television. Rıdvan Ege Kavas came across the programs and asked about the shooting date from the TV directorate, which proved that she had presented the programs in breach of her job's rules. As a result of the investigation which followed, her job as an assistant was terminated because she was working in a different job and Budayıcıoğlu returned to TV as a result. She received her specialization in psychiatry from Hacettepe University in 1977 and worked there as a lecturer for 5 years. During this period, she also hosted a program called İnsan ve Dünyası, which was prepared in cooperation with the university and TRT, and in which subjects such as various diseases and social problems were discussed together with experts.

== Writing career ==
Budayıcıoğlu started her writing career in 2004 with the book Madalyonun İçi, Bir Psikiyatrın Not Defterinden. In her first two books, she covered different psychiatric problems in the form of short stories. With her third book, Hayata Dön, she started to write a single story in detail.

Her first four novels and the one she published in 2019, Camdaki Kız, were psychotherapeutic novels she wrote by narrating real cases she witnessed. The İstanbullu Gelin series, broadcast on Starv TV between 2017 and 2019, is an adaptation of her book, Hayata Dön. The series Doğduğun Ev Kaderindir, which was broadcast on TV8 between 2019 and 2021, was adapted from the book Camdaki Kız. After these two adaptations proved to be successful, two different series were produced in 2020 based on the book Madalyonun İçi, Bir Psikiyatrın Not Defterinden: Kırmızı Oda, which was broadcast on TV8, and Masumlar Apartmanı, which was broadcast on TRT 1.

Budayıcıoğlu has announced the name of her new book as Kırmızı Pelerin. In 2021, a new adaptation of Camdaki Kız was broadcast on Kanal D under the same title.

== Reception ==
Budayıcıoğlu was recognized for her smiling face during her tenure as a TV presenter. Regarding her studentship, the dean of the school she studied at described her as a proud, intelligent and hardworking student. Writing about Budayıcıoğlu's identity as a writer, journalist Ayşe Arman complemented her as "she wrote with passion and passed this passion to the reader" and that her work "is a phenomenon because it is real". In another article, she stated that her books had "great details and soul enriching analysis", and their language was "very clear and fluent". On the other hand, there are also criticisms that her works lack literary depth and that she constantly praises herself between the lines.

After an article about psychologists was published in Gazete Duvar by Pınar Öğünç, it was reported that five of Budayıcıoğlu's colleagues were dismissed as they shared the article on social media. Budayıcıoğlu, who received intense criticism when news broke, admitted that she had fired five psychologists from her own clinic and made a statement to Ayşe Arman. Budayıcıoğlu addressed the subject in an interview: "That's right… It's true that I fired 5 psychologists! Actually, the verb "to fire" sound rather heavy for me. The word "firing" shouldn't appear next to my name. I can say that I have never done anything like this before. There were some people who quit their jobs, but we broke up with all of them on good terms. But I fired these 5 friends! All five were people I loved, colleagues I worked with. One of them was very close to me. I was so upset. They gave such a disastrous interview to a journalist against me. Far beyond disastrous. They make me look like someone I'm not. So, apparently I even interferes with their clothing, and tell them, "You will do it like this", "you will wear it like that!" They distorted and stretched the sentences that I had told them for years to make them good in their profession... All of them shared this on their pages, that means they approved it...".

== Works ==
Novels

- Madalyonun İçi, Bir Psikiyatrın Not Defterinden, 2004, ISBN 9789751409935
- Günahın Üç Rengi, Madalyonun Öteki Yüzü, 2008, ISBN 9789751412874
- Hayata Dön, 2011, ISBN 9789751414601
- Kral Kaybederse, 2015, ISBN 9789751416575
- Camdaki Kız, 2019, ISBN 9786050959628
- Kırmızı Pelerin, 2022
- Hayatın Sesi, 2022, ISBN 9786258036855

For children

- Kral Teo Kitabı, 2018, ISBN 9789752207721

== Adaptations ==
- İstanbullu Gelin is an adaptation of Hayata Dön and was broadcast on Star TV between 2017–19.
- Doğduğun Ev Kaderindir is an adaptation of Camdaki Kız and was broadcast on TV8 between 2019–21.
- Kırmızı Oda is an adaptation of Madalyonun İçi and was broadcast on TV8 between 2020–22.
- Masumlar Apartmanı is an adaptation of the chapter "Çöp Apartman" from Madalyonun İçi and was broadcast on TRT 1 between 2020 and 2022.
- Camdaki Kız is an adaptation of Camdaki Kız and has been broadcast on Kanal D since 2021.
- Terzi is an adaptation of Hayata Dön and is set to be released on Netflix in 2022.
- Yalı Çapkını Star TV, 2022-2023
- Sakla Beni Star TV, 2023-2024
