= İpek Bilgin =

Turkish actress

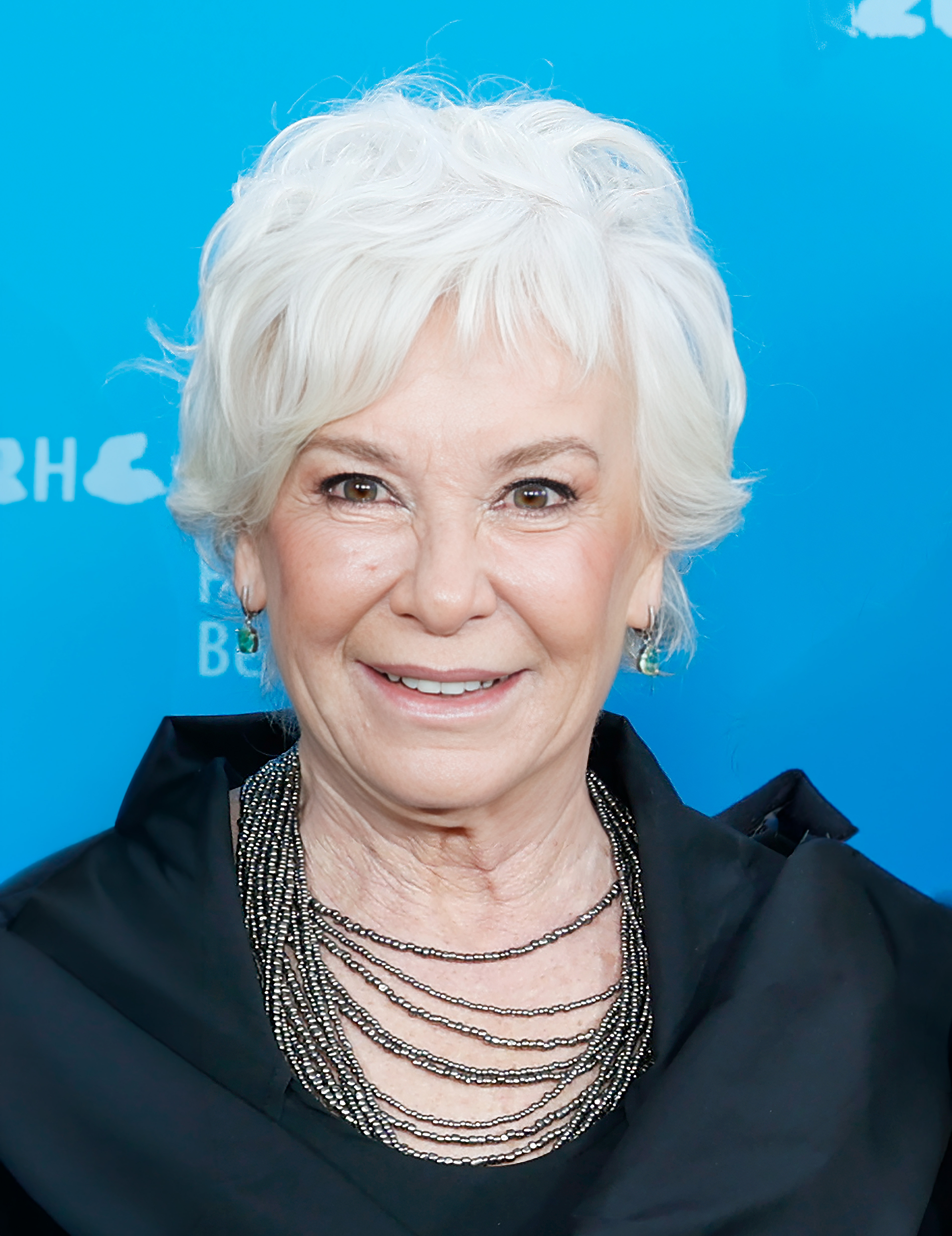
- Bilgin in 2026
- Born: Fatma İpek Bilgin; 24 March 1956 (age 69); Istanbul, Turkey
- Occupations: Actress, translator
- Years active: 1983–present
- Spouse: Cüneyt Çalışkur (died 2011)
- Children: 1

Fatma İpek Bilgin (born 24 March 1956) is a Turkish actress, theatre director and translator. Aside from her career on stage, Bilgin has appeared in various movies and TV series. She has worked for the Ankara State Theatre and first became noticed in 2000s with her roles on television. Her daughter, Çağ Çalışkur, is also an actress.

Bilgin has also translated works by Eric Morris and Joan Hotchkis from English to Turkish. In 2000, she was awarded together with Aylin Damcıoğlu as the Best Actress at the 48th Art Institution Theatre Awards.

== Filmography ==
Movies
Year	Title	Role	Note
2005	İki Genç Kız		
2006	Çinliler Geliyor		
2006	Hokkabaz		
2012	Karnaval		
2013	Hükümet Kadın		
2013	Kelebeğin Rüyası	Muzaffer'in Annesi	
2013	Meryem		
2017	İstanbul Kırmızısı	Güzin	
2025	O da Bir Sey mi	Nigar	
2025	Küçük Bir Hata	Nebahat	
TV series
Year	Title	Role	Note
2009-2011	Ezel	Meliha Uçar	
2012	Leyla'nın Evi	Burcu Yıldız	
2012	Koyu Kırmızı		
2013	20 Dakika	Muavvin Süreyya	
2014	Maral		
2015	Analar ve Anneler	İsmet	
2017-2019	İstanbullu Gelin	Esma Boran	leading role
