= Ceren Ayruk =

Turkish actress

- Born: 4 August 2002 (age 24); Samsun, Turkey
- Occupation: Actress
- Years active: 2023–present

Ceren Ayruk (born 4 August 2002) is a Turkish actress.

Ayruk completed her primary education in Istanbul and finished her secondary education in Samsun. She later studied American Language and Literature at Dokuz Eylül University, where she began her acting work by participating in the university's theatre club.

Ayruk made her professional screen debut in 2023 with the feature film Kuzenler Firarda 2. In 2024, she made a guest appearance in the final episode of the television series Üç Kız Kardeş, portraying the adult version of the character Defne.

In 2025, she appeared in two television series: Kardelenler, in which she played Pelinsu Korkmaz, and Ben Leman, in which she portrayed Ada. In 2026, she began starring as Leyla in the Kanal D series Daha 17, which brought her wider recognition.

== Filmography ==
=== Film ===
Year	Title	Role	Director
2023	Kuzenler Firarda 2	Çevreci 1	Kamil Çetin

=== Television ===
Year	Title	Role	Network	Notes
2024	Üç Kiz Kardeş	Defne	Kanal D	1 episodes
2025	Kardelenler	Pelinsu Korkmaz	ATV	10 episodes
2025	Ben Leman	Ada Karaca	Now	13 episodes
2026–present	Daha 17	Leyla Akkaya	Kanal D	
