= 125 Years Memory =

2015 Japanese film directed by Mitsutoshi Tanaka

- Poster

Japanese name
- Kanji: 海難１８９０
Transcriptions
- Revised Hepburn: Kainan 1890
- Directed by: Mitsutoshi Tanaka
- Screenplay by: Eriko Komatsu
- Produced by: Kazuhito Amano; Norihisa Ohara; Ryosuke Otani; Teiji Ozawa; Riuko Tominaga
- Starring: Seiyo Uchino; Kenan Ece; Shioli Kutsuna; Alican Yücesoy
- Cinematography: Tetsuo Nagata
- Edited by: Akimasa Kawashima
- Music by: Michiru Oshima
- Production companies: Toei Studios Tokyo; Toei Studios Kyoto; Creators' Union; Böcek Yapım
- Distributed by: Toei (international); CGV Mars (Turkey)
- Release dates: 5 December 2015 (Japan); 25 December 2015 (Turkey)
- Running time: 132 minutes
- Countries: Japan; Turkey
- Languages: Japanese; Turkish; English
- Budget: US$15 million
- Box office: ¥780 million (Japan); ₺4.7 million (Turkey)

125 Years Memory (Japanese: 海難１８９０, Hepburn: Kainan 1890) is a 2015 drama film directed by Mitsutoshi Tanaka starring Seiyo Uchino, Kenan Ece and Shioli Kutsuna. Two historical incidents that deepened the friendship between Japan and Turkey are connected in this story of friendship and compassion: The sinking of the Turkish frigate Ertuğrul off the Japanese coast in 1890 and the evacuation of Japanese nationals from Iran in 1985. It received the Japan Academy Film Prize in ten categories, including Best Art Direction, Best Sound Recording, Excellent Film and Excellent Director. A Japanese-Turkish co-production, the film was produced by Japan's Creators' Union and Toei together with Turkey's Böcek Yapım. It was released in Japan by Toei on 5 December 2015 and in Turkey by CGV Mars on 25 December 2015.

== Plot ==
=== Ertuğrul episode ===
In the night of 16 September 1890, while returning from a goodwill visit to Japan, the Turkish frigate Ertuğrul is caught up in a typhoon and sinks in the Pacific Ocean off the coast of Kushimoto, Wakayama. Hearing an alarm bell, the villagers of Kashino, a poor fishing village on Kushimoto's island of Kii Oshima, rush to the shore. They are confronted with the grisly spectacle of vast numbers of dead and dying. With more than 500 crew members dead, it is one of the largest sea accidents in history at that time. Risking their own lives, the villagers are able to rescue 69 Turkish sailors. Tamura (Seiyo Uchino), a doctor living in Kashino village, and his assistant Haru (Shioli Kutsuna) treat the injured. In the wake of her life rescuing efforts Haru builds a special bond with Mustafa (Kenan Ece), an officer on the Ertuğrul. Although being very poor and having hardly to eat, the villagers share what little they have with strangers from a country 9,000 kilometers away and give them shelter in their small village of only 60 households.

=== Tehran episode ===
In the year 1985, during the Iran–Iraq War, Iraq announces an indiscriminate attack and to shoot down any aircraft over Iranian air space. Japanese Ambassador Yutaka Nomura (Toshiyuki Nagashima) requests rescue flights from Japan, but is told that a quick response is not possible. While evacuation flights from other nations are arriving, more than 300 Japanese are stranded in Tehran. Harumi (Shioli Kutsuna), a teacher at the Tehran Japanese School, prevails upon Nomura to ask the Turkish ambassador for help. Turkish Prime Minister Turgut Özal (Deniz Oral) decides to evacuate the Japanese. In the morning of 19 March, only a few hours before Iraq's ultimatum expires, a Turkish Airlines aircraft takes off for Tehran. Not only is Tehran already under heavy rocket fire, but the remaining Turks at Tehran Mehrabad Airport still need to be convinced that they won't be able to board their own country's evacuation flight. That's when Turkish embassy staff Murat (Kenan Ece) starts speaking out to his fellow citizens about the compassion and sacrifice Japanese villagers had shown to Turkish sailors shipwrecked far away a long time ago.

== Background ==
The film was initiated by the residents of Kushimoto, a coastal town in Wakayama Prefecture where the first episode of the film takes place. For a very long time they wanted to make a film about the Ertuğrul story and thus send a message of friendship and peace to the rest of the world. To pursue their goal, Kushimoto Mayor Katsumasa Tashima contacted film director Mitsutoshi Tanaka and the NPO Ertuğrul Saves the World was established in the city of Wakayama. After more than ten years of work the film was completed in 2015, commemorating the 125th anniversary of Japanese-Turkish friendship.

== Cast ==
=== Leading artists ===
- Seiyo Uchino: Motosada Tamura
- Kenan Ece: Mustafa/Murat
- Shioli Kutsuna: Haru/Harumi
- Alican Yücesoy: Bekir

=== Supporting artists ===
- Yui Natsukawa: Yuki
- Toshiyuki Nagashima: Yutaka Nomura
- Naoto Takenaka: Kudo
- Takashi Sasano: Mayor Sato
- Shunsuke Daitoh: Shintaro
- Ayako Kobayashi: Tome
- Yukiyoshi Ozawa: Gentaro Fujimoto
- Takayuki Takuma: Kimura
- Gota Watabe: Shinichi
- Yuu Tokui: Heiji
- Yukijiro Hotaru: Takeshita
- Rino Katase: Sato
- Mehmet Özgür: Âli Bey
- Uğur Polat: Osman Pasha (tr)
- Melis Babadağ: Hatice
- Ayumi Takano: Michi Kimura
- Deniz Oral: Turgut Özal
- Hakkı Haluk Cömert: Mahmut
- Cem Cücenoğlu: Naci
- Mert Aygün: Ali Efendi
- Tamer Levent: Süleyman Bey
- Duygu Sarışın: Turkish Airlines ground staff
- Ali Açıkbaş: Ertuğrul crew member
- Can Akalın: Hüseyin
- Eray Ayaz: Can
- Yeliz Çelebi: Müge Sayar
- Bertan Dirikolu: Turkish naval officer
- Alper Düzen: İhsan Pekel
- Yağız Elmastaşoğlu: Salih
- Sato Higashi: Biwa artist
- Nobue Iketani: Kiyo
- Ayhan Işık: Veysel Atasoy
- Minami Kajihara: Tae
- Noboru Kaneko: Yamamoto
- Momoko Kato (ja): Japanese national in Tehran
- Shunchou Katsura: Kushimoto resident
- Naoki Kawano: Mankichi
- Marie Kobayashi: Kushimoto resident
- Masataka Kobayashi: Japanese embassy staff
- Shingo Koike: Naoki Agata
- Görkem Mertsöz: Mehmet Ali
- Minosuke: Takeo
- Hitomi Miwa: Katsu
- Emiko Miyazaki: Kushimoto resident
- Halit Mızraklı: Selim
- Ayami Nakamura: Courtesan in Kushimoto
- Natsuka Ogawa: Japanese national in Tehran
- Akane Owaki: Courtesan in Kushimoto
- Oğuz Öztekin: Hayri
- Erkan Pekbay: Sarkis
- Tomoko Saito: Nobu
- Savaş Satış: Ertuğrul crew member
- Murat Serezli: Turkish Airlines official
- Toshie Takada: Miyamoto
- Chiyo Takahashi: Courtesan in Kushimoto
- Yuusaku Tanaka: Yoshimoto
- Yuuki Tsujimoto: Yano
- Koichi Ueda: Fukushima
- Ruka Wakabayashi: Hiroyuki Kimura
- Serdar Yeğin: Orhan Suyolcu

== Release ==
Prior to the film's official launch, special screenings took place in Wakayama City on 20 October 2015 and in Fukuoka on 2 November 2015. A novelization by author Mika Toyoda was published on 6 November 2015. During a visit of Japanese Prime Minister Shinzo Abe to Turkey, Abe and Turkish President Recep Tayyip Erdoğan watched a 30-minute promotional version of the film at Yıldız Palace in Istanbul on 13 November 2015. They were joined by director Mitsutoshi Tanaka, actor Kenan Ece and actress Melis Babadağ. Pre-release screenings took place in Kushimoto from 23 to 25 November 2015 and in Osaka on 28 November 2015. After the world premiere on 1 December 2015 in Tokyo, the film was released in Japan on 5 December 2015, screening in 309 movie theaters. At the Marunouchi Toei Theater in Tokyo audiences were greeted by director Mitsutoshi Tanaka and actors Seiyo Uchino, Kenan Ece, Shioli Kutsuna and Yui Natsukawa on the opening day. Following opening galas in Ankara on 22 December 2015 and in Istanbul on 24 December 2015, the film was released in Turkey on 25 December 2015. In Turkey the film screened in 300 movie theaters. The theme song Ertuğrul Türküsü, sung by Turkish folk singer Kubat, was released on 29 December 2015. In the film, the song is performed by actor Savaş Satış. Since its theatrical release the film has screened around the world, most notably at the 2016 Toronto Japanese Film Festival. A DVD and Blu-ray disc were released by Toei Video on 8 June 2016. Starting in 2021, online screenings took place in various countries, e.g. in the UK in June 2021 and in Canada and the USA in March 2022. The film is available online on demand on most common Japanese streaming platforms, among others on the Japanese site of Amazon Prime Video.

== Reception ==
=== Box office ===
On its opening weekend in Japan, the film was fourth in both admissions, with 88,295, and gross, with US$856,650. On its second weekend, it dropped to seventh, again both in admissions and in gross, with US$638,625. On its third weekend, it was tenth placed in both admissions and gross, with US$336,824. In Wakayama Prefecture, where the first part of the film takes place, the film screened in 5 theaters. With 6,247 admissions and ¥6.9 million in ticket sales on its first day it became the highest grossing film on opening day in Wakayama for 2015. Total theatrical revenue was ¥780 million in Japan and ₺4.7 million in Turkey.

=== Accolades ===
Year	Award	Category	Recipients and nominees	Results
2016	39th Japan Academy Film Prize	Picture of the Year		Nominated
2016	39th Japan Academy Film Prize	Director of the Year	Mitsutoshi Tanaka	Nominated
2016	39th Japan Academy Film Prize	Screenplay of the Year	Eriko Komatsu	Nominated
2016	39th Japan Academy Film Prize	Outstanding Performance by an Actor in a Leading Role	Seiyo Uchino	Nominated
2016	39th Japan Academy Film Prize	Outstanding Achievement in Music	Michiru Oshima	Nominated
2016	39th Japan Academy Film Prize	Outstanding Achievement in Cinematography	Tetsuo Nagata	Nominated
2016	39th Japan Academy Film Prize	Outstanding Achievement in Lighting Direction	Kiyoto Ando	Nominated
2016	39th Japan Academy Film Prize	Outstanding Achievement in Art Direction	Hidefumi Hanatani	Won
2016	39th Japan Academy Film Prize	Outstanding Achievement in Sound Recording	Nobuhiko Matsukage	Won
2016	39th Japan Academy Film Prize	Outstanding Achievement in Film Editing	Akimasa Kawashima	Nominated
2017	VFX-JAPAN Awards 2017	Best Motion Picture	Masaaki Kamada	Nominated
