= Canan Ergüder =

Turkish actress (born 1977)

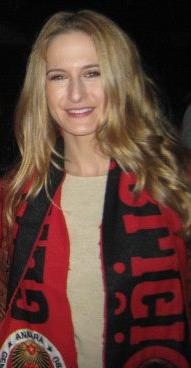
- Ergüder in 2011
- Born: 15 July 1976 (age 50); Istanbul, Turkey
- Education: London Academy of Music and Dramatic Art
- Occupation: Actress
- Years active: 2000–present
- Spouses: Christopher Burke (m. 2006; div. 2009) Kenan Ece (m. 2017)
- Children: 1

Canan Ergüder (born 15 July 1976) is a Turkish actress.

== Life and career ==
Ergüder was born on 15 July 1976 in Istanbul, Turkey. Her father, Üstün Ergüder, is a professor in political sciences. Her family is of Bosniak descent. She studied theatre at Franklin & Marshall College and later graduated with a master's degree from the Actors Studio Drama School at the New School. She also briefly took part in a program at the London Academy of Music and Dramatic Art. In 2003, she became a permanent member of Actors Studio, which is founded by Elia Kazan, Cheryl Crawford and Robert Lewis. In 2007, she received the Best Supporting Actress Award at the Hoboken International Film Festival for her role in Shooting Johnson Roebling as Nancy.

After continuing her career on stage by taking parts in plays such as Graceland, Rattlesnake, Twelfth Night, Love's Labor's Lost, Three Sisters and Arcadia.

She made her television debut in 2007 with hit series Bıçak Sırtı with Nejat İşler, Mehmet Günsür after which she most notably appeared in Binbir Gece. She is best known for franchise crime series and film Behzat Ç. Bir Ankara Polisiyesi with Erdal Beşikçioğlu, Nejat İşler, Fatih Artman.

In 2009, she received the Most Successful Actress in a Supporting Role award at the Afife Jale Theatre Awards for her role in the play Bayrak. Ergüder had a supporting role in the 2011 movie Will, and similarly made appearances in Russell Crowe's The Water Diviner and Huner Saleem's Tight Dress.

Between 2014–2016, she had a leading role in the TV series Güllerin Savaşı with Damla Sönmez. She played in Menajerimi Ara which adapted from French series alongside Fatih Artman.

== Personal life ==
She is married to Kenan Ece, and they have one son.

On 6 April 2021, she announced on her social media accounts that she was diagnosed with breast cancer. By 2022, she successfully completed her treatment, including chemotherapy and surgery, and returned to her acting career. She later spoke about the physical and emotional challenges of treatment, including losing her hair during chemotherapy.

== Filmography ==
=== Film ===
Film
Year	Title	Role	Notes
2007	Shooting Johnson Roebling	Nancy	Supporting role
2011	Behzat Ç. Seni Kalbime Gömdüm	Prosecutor Esra	Leading role
2011	Will	Mina Bilic	Supporting role
2014	Kurt	Hilal	Short film
2014	The Water Diviner	Red Cross nurse	Supporting role
2016	Tight Dress	Venus	Leading role
2018	Kaos	Fadime	Leading role
2018	Raveling	Claire	Short film
2025	Sükut	Neyran	Film
2027	Danalar ve İnsanlar	?	Film

=== Television ===
Television
Year	Title	Role	Notes
2007–2008	Bıçak Sırtı	Serra (Piano teacher)	Supporting role
2008–2009	Binbir Gece	Eda Akınay	Leading role
2010–2012	Behzat Ç. Bir Ankara Polisiyesi	Prosecutor Esra	Leading role
2012	Atlılar	Zikra	Voice over
2013	Galip Derviş	Leyla Gürsoy	Guest appearance
2014–2016	Güllerin Savaşı	Gülfem Sipahi	Leading role
2017	Yıldızlar Şahidim	Zeynep	Leading role
2019	Behzat Ç.	Prosecutor Esra	Supporting role
2020–2021	Menajerimi Ara	Feris Dikmen	Leading role
2022	Oğlum	Demet	Leading role
2023-2024	Aile	Leyla Soykan Sayıcı	Supporting role

== Theatre ==
Theatre
Year	Title	Role	Venue
2000	The Median Line	Kate	Grove Street Playhouse
2001	The Median Line	Kate	Access Theatre
2001	Anthony & Cleopatra	Charmian	Expanded Arts
2004	Graceland	Donnie' n' Marie	The Workshop Theater Co.
2004	Graceland	Donnie' n' Marie	The Connelly Theater
2004	Rattlesnake	Jessie	The Workshop Theater Co.
2007	The Patient Therapist	Sydney	The Chernuchin Theater
2009–2012	Bayrak	Woman	Garaj İstanbul/ Muammer Karaca/ KREK
2010	Bomba	Waitress	Garaj İstanbul/ IKSV Salon
2010	Fırtına	Caliban/Ferdinand	International Istanbul Theatre Festival
2012–2015	Nehir	The Other Woman	Oyun Atölyesi
2019	Hipokrat	Yeşim Doğan	Toy İstanbul

== Awards ==
Year	Award	Category
2007	Hoboken International Film Festival	Best Supporting Actress
2009	Afife Jale Theatre Awards	Most Successful Actress in a Supporting Role
