= Deniz Uğur =

Turkish actress (born 1973)

- Born: October 17, 1973 (age 52); Ankara, Turkey
- Education: Istanbul University
- Occupations: Actress, scriptwriter
- Spouses: İsmail Hakkı Sunat (m. 1997; died 2004) Erdinç Gülener (m. 2021)
- Partner: Reha Muhtar (2008–2010)
- Children: 3

Deniz Uğur (born October 17, 1973) is a Turkish film actress, script writer and dubbing artist.

== Early life and family ==
Deniz Uğur is the only child of opera singer Mete Uğur and ballerina Suna Uğur. The chamberlain of Sultan Abdulhamid II, İhsan Bey, was the father of her grandmother Saliha Hanım, and her grandparent Nadir Bayer was raised under the auspices of Naime Sultan, the daughter of Sultan Abdulhamid II in Ottoman palace. She is also related to Keriman Halis Ece and David Bennent.

She is a mother of three children named Engin Deniz, Mina Deniz and Poyraz Deniz.

== Education and career ==
She graduated from Istanbul University Conservatory of Ballet Department, after taking the examinations of higher education and graduated in 1995. Before graduation, she played the lead role on Görünmeyen Dostlar with Şükran Güngör and Kadriye Kenter in Kenter Theatre, beginning her professional theatre career. She drew attention with French Comedy Çetin Ceviz by playing lead role with Cihan Ünal and Nevra Serezli. In 1997, at Ankara Movie Fest, owing to the role in Bir Erkeğin Anatomisi, she was awarded as Promising Actress.

After her long break from cinema and theater, through leading with Engin Alkan on Huysuz Musical, she became a candidate on Afife Awards although without musical branch.

In 2015, she was applauded by Yıldız Kenter and Haldun Dormen for her leading performance on Guguk Kuşu with Oktay Kaynarca.

She is also a columnist, script writer, songwriter and novel-writer.

== Filmography ==
- 2023, Cenazemize Hoş Geldiniz - Nevin
- 2023, Demir Kadın: Neslican (movie) - Fatma Tay
- 2022, Bir Peri Masalı (series) - Figen Kileci
- 2021–2022, Böru 2039 (series) - Almila Erk
- 2021, Kırmızı Oda (series) - Azra
- 2019–2020, Zalim İstanbul (series) - Seher Yılmaz
- 2018, İnsanlık Suçu (series) - Emel Gökdemir
- 2017–2018, Kırgın Çiçekler (Series) - Macide
- 2017, Bir Deli Sevda (series) - Alev
- 2017, Hep Yek 2 (movie) - Aslı
- 2015–2016, Kung Fu Panda (movie – dubbing: Angelina Jolie "Tigress")
- 2015–2016 Frankenstein (theatre)
- 2015 Guguk Kuşu (theatre)
- 2015, Aşk Zamanı (movie) -Reyhan
- 2015, Kara Kutu - Canan
- 2015, Detay (movie) - Duygu
- 2013–2014, Umutsuz Ev Kadınları (series, Turkish version of Desperate Housewives) - Gülşah Taşdelen
- 2014, Gulyabani (movie) - Güneş
- 2013–2014 Huysuz Müzikali (theatre)
- 2012 Adını Feriha Koydum Emir'in Yolu (series) - Sanem Ilhanli
- 2012 Pamuk Prenses ve Avcı (Snow White and the Huntsman) (movie – dubbing: Charlize Theron "Ravenna")
- 2012 Bu Son Olsun (movie) - Nimet
- 2011 Kung Fu Panda (movie – dubbing: Angelina Jolie "Tigress")
- 2011 Adını Feriha Koydum (series) - Sanem Ilhanli
- 2008 Kung Fu Panda (movie – dubbing: Angelina Jolie "Tigress")
- 2008 Paramparça Aşklar (series)
- 2007 Baba Oluyorum (series)
- 2007 Ertelenmiş Hayatlar (series)
- 2006 Hayatım Sana Feda (series)
- 2006 Sahte Prenses (series)
- 2005 Yağmur Zamanı (series)
- 2004 Zümrüt (series)
- 2001–2002 Benimle Evlenir Misin? (series)
- 2001 Bana Şans Dile (series)
- 2000 Mert Ali 1-2 (TV film)
- 2000 Yalan Dünya (series)
- 1999 Kurtlar Sofrası (series)
- 1998 Güldüren Cazibe (series)
- 1996 Bir Erkeğin Anatomisi (movie)
- 1995 Çetin Ceviz (theatre)
- 1993 Yaz Evi (serie)
- 1993 Görünmeyen Dostlar (theatre)
