= Kenan Ece =

Turkish actor

- Born: Kenan Cahit Ece; 24 December 1980 (age 44); Dubai, United Arab Emirates
- Occupation: Actor
- Years active: 2009–present
- Spouse: Canan Ergüder (m. 2017)
- Children: 1

Kenan Cahit Ece (born 24 December 1980) is a Turkish actor.

== Life and career ==
After graduating from St. George's Austrian High School, Ece finished his studies at Davidson College with a degree in theatre and economic studies. While in university, he started taking part in many plays. After graduating, he moved to Dublin, where he lived for four years and took acting lessons at Gaiety School of Acting and Irish Film Academy. He then appeared in 13 episodes of the Irish soap opera Fair City. He then started working at the Irish national theatre, Abbey Theatre. Upon his return to Turkey, he was cast in the movie Yüreğine Sor, directed by Yusuf Kurçenli. He then appeared in the movie Beni Unutma. Ece simultaneously continued his television career with different roles in the TV series Samanyolu, Deli Saraylı, İzmir Çetesi, Krem and Kalp hırsızı. In 2012, together with Mustafa Üstündağ he founded the Çamurdan Theatre. He gained international recognition with his role in the Japanese-Turkish co-production 125 Years Memory. In 2018, he then appeared in the tv series Avlu with Demet Evgar. Ece further rose to prominence with his role in the TV series Sadakatsiz.

His grandfather was Turgan Ece, a former football player and manager of Galatasaray S.K., and brother to Keriman Halis Ece. Ece is married to actress Canan Ergüder, with whom he has a son.

== Filmography ==
- 2009 - Yüreğine Sor (Mustafa) (film)
- 2009 - Masumlar (Kaan) (TV series)
- 2010 - Deli Saraylı (Emir Zahir) (TV series)
- 2010 - Gecekondu (Kendisi) (TV program)
- 2010 - Samanyolu (Namık) (TV series)
- 2011 - Ay Tutulması (Kenan) (TV series)
- 2011 - Beni Unutma (Hakan) (film)
- 2011 - Bul Beni (film)
- 2011 - İzmir Çetesi (Ateş) (TV series)
- 2012 - Krem (TV series)
- 2012 - Sağ Salim (Ayhan) (film)
- 2012 - Son (TV series)
- 2012 - Çakallarla Dans 2: Hastasıyız Dede (film)
- 2014 - Gulyabani (Murat) (film)
- 2014 - Kalp Hırsızı (Tekin) (TV series)
- 2015 - Aşk Olsun (film)
- 2015 - Güllerin Savaşı (TV series)
- 2015 - 125 Years Memory (Mustafa/Murat) (film)
- 2017 - Cingöz Recai: Bir Efsanenin Dönüşü (film)
- 2017 - Ver Kaç (Sedat) (film)
- 2018 - Avlu (Murat Ünal) (TV series)
- 2021 - Sadakatsiz (Turgay Güngör) (TV series)
- 2023 - Kin (Hazma) (TV series)

== Theatre ==
- Islah Evi : Norman Lock - Çamurdan Theatre - 2012
- Bakarsın Bulutlar Gider : Özen Yula - BO Production - 2014
