= Dilara Aksüyek =

Turkish actress

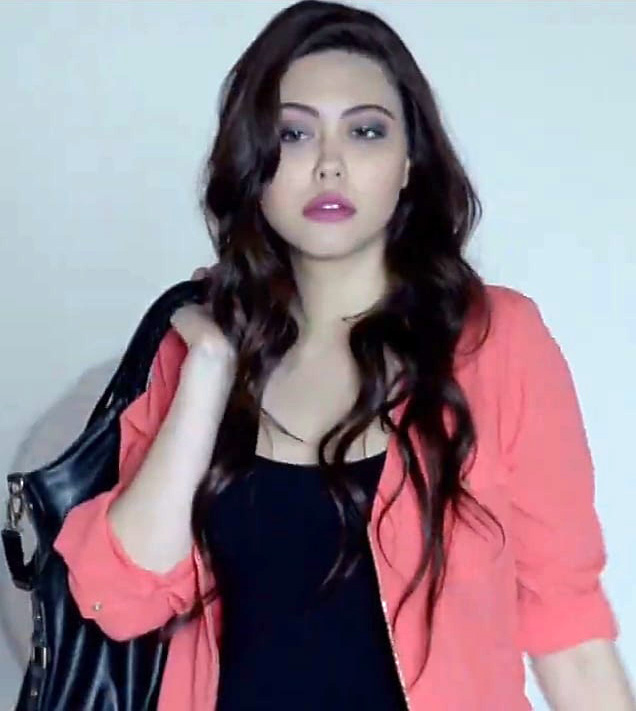
- Born: Karşıyaka, Turkey
- Occupation: Actress
- Years active: 2012–present

Dilara Aksüyek is a Turkish actress.

Aksüyek was born in Karşıyaka. At the age of 7, she moved with her family to Edirne. In 2007, she moved to Istanbul and studied theatre at Müjdat Gezen Art Center.

She made her television debut in 2012 with a role in the series Evlerden Biri. She was first noted with adult and teen versions of her role Şadiye in the 2013 drama series Merhamet based novel. The following year, she portrayed the character of Deniz in Kadim Dostum.

In 2015, she portrayed Mahfiruz Hatun in the historical drama Muhteşem Yüzyıl: Kösem. She had her breakthrough in 2017 with a leading role in İstanbullu Gelin.

== Filmography ==
Film
| Year | Title | Role | Note |
|---|---|---|---|
| 2016 | Mahrumlar | Tanem | Supporting role |
TV series
| Year | Title | Role | Notes |
| 2012 | Evlerden Biri | Filiz | Supporting role |
| 2013 | Merhamet | Şadiye | Supporting role |
| 2014 | Kadim Dostum | Deniz | Supporting role |
| 2015 | Adı Mutluluk | Dolunay | Leading role |
| 2015 | Muhteşem Yüzyıl: Kösem | Mahfiruz Hatun | Supporting role |
| 2017–2019 | İstanbullu Gelin | İpek Boran | Supporting role |
| 2020–2021 | Arıza | Füsun Keskin | Supporting role |
| 2021 | Baş Belası | Nazli Tüzün | Supporting role |
| 2022 | Baba | Elif Paktaş | Supporting role |
| 2022–2023 | Yürek Çıkmazı | Feride | Supporting role |
| 2024 | Ben Bu Cihana Siğmazam | Arzu | Supporting role |
| 2024–2025 | Leyla: Hayat... Aşk... Adalet... | Serap | Supporting role |
| 2025–2026 | Kıskanmak | Şükran Şevket | Supporting role |
| 2026–present | Daha 17 | Nuray Soysal | Leading role |
