= Melisa Sözen =

Turkish actress (born 1985)

- Born: 6 July 1985 (age 40); Istanbul, Turkey
- Occupation: Actress
- Years active: 1997–present
- Spouse: Alican Yücesoy (m. 2013; div. 2014)

Melisa Sözen (born 6 July 1985) is a Turkish actress.

== Biography ==
Starting her professional career at the very early age of 15, she studied in theatre department of Pera Fine Arts High School. Sözen starred in many Turkish TV hits including Çemberimde Gül Oya, Bıçak Sırtı, Bir Bulut Olsam, Muhteşem Yüzyıl, Kırmızı Oda and Şubat. She played two different roles in the surreal series Şubat alongside her ex-husband Alican Yücesoy.

After working with Turkey's most prominent directors in movies like Av Mevsimi, Bir Varmış Bir Yokmuş and Cenneti Beklerken. Sözen attracted international attention with her phenomenal acting in Nuri Bilge Ceylan's Palme d'Or winning Kış Uykusu in 2014. Sözen frequently was invited as a jury member to many international film festivals including Guanajuato International Film Festival (Mexico, 2015), International Istanbul Film Festival (Turkey, 2016), Sarajevo Film Festival (Bosnia Herzegovina, 2017) and Cannes Series (France, 2018).

Following her role in the 3rd Season of Éric Rochant's influential series Le bureau des légendes in 2017, Sözen moved to Paris for a while and worked on her French. Her first leading role in a French movie came in 2019 with Damien veut changer le monde.

With Kenan İmirzalıoğlu, she played in Blutv's detective series Alef about history of theology. Sözen appeared in Netflix series Biz Kimden Kaçıyorduk Anne?, the adaptation of the Perihan Mağden's novel. She had leading role in an episode of mini series 7 Yüz with ensemble cast.

Achieving an extraordinary level of critical success in her homeland by winning both Theater Critics Association's and Film Critics Association's awards for the actress in a leading role in 2015 with her performances in play Kalp Düğümü (The Knot of the Heart) .

In 2025, Sözen was questioned by Istanbul police on suspicion of "promoting terrorist propaganda", following her role in Le Bureau des Légendes, in which her character wore an outfit similar to that of the YPG, designated as a terrorist organisation in Turkey. Sözen, who was not detained, denied that the costume was a deliberate reference to the group and observed that the programme had not been broadcast in Turkey.

== Personal life ==
As of 2014, she is in a relationship with Harun Tekin who is one of the founding members and the vocalist of the Turkish rock band Mor ve Ötesi.

== Filmography ==
=== Web series ===
Year	Title	Role	Note
2017	Le Bureau des Légendes	Esrin	Canal + Presents
2017	7Yüz	Banu	BluTV Presents
2020	Alef	Yaşar	FX & BluTV Presents
2023	Biz Kimden Kaçıyorduk Anne?	Mother	Netflix Presents

=== TV series ===
Year	Title	Role	Note
1997	Baba Evi		Guest
1999	Kadınlar Kulübü	Young	Guest
2001	Nisan Yağmuru	Nilüfer	Guest
2001	Yeni Hayat	Özgür	
2002	Asmalı Konak		Guest
2003	Büyümüş De Küçülmüş	Şebnem	
2003	Şıh Senem	Şıh kızı Sinem	
2003	Şarkılar Seni Söyler	Fatoş	
2004-2005	Çemberimde Gül Oya	Feriha	
2005	Beşinci Boyut	İş Kadını Özlem Güler Ekergil	Guest
2006	Azap Yolu	Burcu	
2007	Hakkını Helal Et	Gamze	Guest
2007-2008	Bıçak Sırtı	Nisan Ertuğrul	
2009-2010	Bir Bulut Olsam	Narin Bulut	
2010	Güneydoğudan Öyküler Önce Vatan	Aylin Solmaz	
2010	Kollama	Avukat Pınar Büyük	Guest
2011	Reis	Ayşe	
2012	Muhteşem Yüzyıl	Nora (Efsun Hatun)	Joined
2012	Şubat	Yağmur & Sabah	
2014	Anasının Oğlu	Ece	
2015	Beş Kardeş	Fahriye	
2016-2017	Hayat Şarkısı	İpek	Joined
2018	Babamın Günahları	Yeşim	
2020	Kırmızı Oda	Alya	Joined

=== Films ===
Year	Title	Role	Note
2000	Aşk Güzel Şeydir		TV film
2000	Köçek		TV film
2001	Bana Şans Dile	Tuba	
2004	Okul	Ceyda	
2004	O Şimdi Mahkum	Aylin	
2004	Kayıp Aşklar	Nermin	
2005	Deli Mavi / İşte Öyle Bir Şey	Lara	TV film
2006	Cenneti Beklerken	Leyla	
2006	Eve Giden Yol 1914	Safiye	
2007	Kabuslar Evi: Seni Beklerken	Mukaddes-Ece	
2008	Para=Dolar		TV film
2010	Av Mevsimi	Asiye	
2012	Pazarları Hiç Sevmem	Deniz	
2014	Kış Uykusu	Nihal	
2014	Benimle Var Mısın		
2015	Bir Varmış Bir Yokmuş	Nehir	
2017	Çember: Kızımı Bulun	İpek Eryılmaz	TV film series
2019	Damien veut changer le monde	Selma	

=== Short film ===
Year	Title	Role	Note
2002	İçerideki	Zeynep	
2005	Çarpışma	Purse woman	
2006	İade-i Ziyaret	Cansu	
2019	The Day After	Woman on the bus	

=== Dubbing ===
Year	Title	Role	Note
2009	Casus Kızlar	Clover	
2020	Ben Tek Siz Hepiniz	Operator	
