= Firat =

Firat is a Kurdish name. It is also a latinized version of Fırat, the Turkish equivalent.

Notable persons with that name include:

- Firat Arslan (born 1970), German boxer of Turkish descent
- Firat Ayverdi (born 1990), Kurdish film actor
- Firat Cewerî (born 1959), Kurdish writer, translator and journalist
- Firat Ezel Filiz (born 1988), Turkish volleyball player

== See also ==
- Fırat (disambiguation)
