= Berkay Hardal =

Turkish actor

- Born: 18 November 1996 (age 29); Istanbul, Turkey
- Education: Trakya University
- Occupation: Actor
- Years active: 2017–present
- Spouse: Dilan Telkök (m. 2019)

Berkay Hardal (born 18 November 1996) is a Turkish actor. He first received media attention in 2017 when he appeared in İstanbullu Gelin.

Hardal is originally from Manisa Akhisar. He graduated from Trakya University. He had his first acting experience with the series İstanbullu Gelin, which was shared by Özcan Deniz and Aslı Enver. Hardal is known as Murat Boran in the series İstanbullu Gelin. In 2019 Hardal married his colleague and friend Dilan Telkök. he was expecting their first child in march 2024.

== Filmography ==
Television

Year	Title	Role	Note
2017–2018	İstanbullu Gelin	Murat Boran	Lead Role
2018	Meleklerin Aşkı	Yağmur Duru	Lead Role
2019	Kardeş Çocukları	Savaş Ekim	Lead Role
