= Who Were We Running From? =

TV series

- Poster featuring the unnamed Mother character
- Genre: Crime drama
- Country of origin: Turkey
- Original language: Turkish
- No. of episodes: 7

Original release
- Network: Netflix
- Release: 24 March 2023

Who Were We Running From? (Turkish: Biz Kimden Kaçıyorduk Anne?) is a 2023 Turkish crime thriller television series starring Melisa Sözen, Eylül Tumbar and Musa Uzunlar, broadcast on Netflix.

The series is based on a novel with the same name by author Perihan Mağden.

== Plot ==
The story is about a mother (unnamed, played by Sözen) and daughter (named "Bambi" like the Disney character, Tumbar) running from a mysterious past.

== Reception ==
After its debut, in the 7-day period that ended on April 2, 2023, the show was viewed 35.8 million hours, making it the number 1 non-English language show on Netflix.

The Daily Free Press's review of the series was titled "Too many questions, not enough answers". Polly Conwat of Common Sense Media wrote that it "stretches out the mystery to a near-frustrating point," but was "compelling" and "cinematically shot".

== Viewership ==
According to U.S. data published by Media Play News using PlumResearch metrics, Who Were We Running From? reached 3.3 million unique viewers on Netflix during the week ending April 2, 2023, with an average time spent of 132 minutes.
