= Melis Babadağ =

Turkish actress

- Born: 17 January 1984 (age 41); Ankara, Turkey
- Occupation(s): Actress, interior architect
- Years active: 2009–present
- Spouse: Yiğit Özer (m. 2015; div. 2019)

Melis Babadağ (born 17 January 1984) is a Turkish actress.

== Life and career ==
Babadağ was born on 17 January 1984 in Ankara, but was raised in Adana. She finished her studies at Üsküdar Anatolian High School in 2001 and graduated from Marmara University School of Fine Arts with a degree in interior architecture. She had her first experience on stage at the age of 5 and throughout her studies continued to appear in theatre plays as an amateur. In 2002 she started to appear in television commercials and later began receiving acting lessons from Ayla Algan and Ergün Demir. She made her professional debut in 2009 with her roles as Emine in the TV series Cam Kırıkları, and as Didar in Aile Saadeti. Between 2011 and 2014, she began to rise to prominence with her role as Elçin in the teen drama Pis Yedili. In 2014, she portrayed the character of Zümrüt in TRT 1's series Yeşil Deniz. Babadağ has also appeared in a number of feature films, including Beni Unutma (2011), 125 Years Memory (2015) and Aykut Enişte (2019).

Babadağ, who has been practicing interior architecture for a long time, started painting at the age of 3 and continues to be interested in sculpture as an amateur. Babadağ, who is also frequently involved in charity projects, was among the speakers of the meeting organized by the Pediatric Rheumatology Association in order to draw attention to rheumatic diseases in children on the occasion of World Arthritis Day on 12 October 2016. She is also a board member of the SosyalBen Foundation, which supports children aged 7-13 living in disadvantaged areas.

== Filmography ==
- 2023: Benim Güzel Ailem (Öznur) (TV series)
- 2022: Aşk Çağırırsan Gelir (Dilara) (film)
- 2022: İlginç Bazı Olaylar (Eylem) (streaming series)
- 2021: Aykut Enişte 2 (Gülşah) (film)
- 2021: Barbaroslar: Akdeniz'in Kılıcı (Zeynep) (TV series)
- 2019: Aykut Enişte (Gülşah) (film)
- 2017: Elimiz Mahkum (Nil) (TV film)
- 2016: Oğlan Bizim Kız Bizim (Zeynep) (film)
- 2015: 125 Years Memory (Hatice) (film)
- 2014: Yeşil Deniz (Zümrüt) (TV series)
- 2014: Mihrap Yerinde (Pelin (Mihrap's daughter) (TV series)
- 2011–2014: Pis Yedili (Elçin) (TV series)
- 2011: Beni Unutma (Sevda) (film)
- 2010: Geniş Aile (Şevval) (TV series)
- 2009: İncir Reçeli (Duygu) (short film)
- 2009: Aile Saadeti (Didar) (TV series)
- 2009: Cam Kırıkları (Emine) (TV series)
