= Fırat Çelik =

Turkish-German actor

- Born: March 25, 1981 (age 44); Ostfildern, Stuttgart region, Germany
- Occupation: Actor
- Years active: 2008–present

Fırat Çelik (born March 25, 1981) is a Turkish-German actor.

== Biography ==
He was born in Ostfildern, Germany. He is the son of Turkish immigrants from Bursa, who returned to Turkey when he was two. When Fırat was 9, his family emigrated to France. The Çelik family settled in the suburbs of Champigny-sur-Marne. At 19 he started being male model and make advertising in such activity.

He took drama classes supported by its close. Fırat at that time was not quite sure what career to choose, but that changed when he met director Thierry Harcourt. Harcourt, believed in the capabilities of Çelik and decided to train as an actor.

== Filmography ==
=== Televisión ===
| Year | Title | Role |
|---|---|---|
| 2008 | Famille d’acceuil | İlhan |
| 2009 | Kış Masalı | Masum |
| 2010-2012 | Fatmagül'ün Suçu Ne? | Mustafa Nalçalı |
| 2013 | 20 Dakika | Ozan Çevikoğlu |
| 2014 | Firuze | Oğuz |
| 2014-2015 | Gönül İşleri | Asrın |
| 2015 | Poyraz Karayel | Mete Durukan |
| 2021 | Capitain Marleau | Adam Celik |
| 2021 | Alex Hugo | Adam Celik |
| 2021 | Sakli | Ozan |
| 2022 | Yalı Çapkını | Efe |
| 2023-2024 | Kudüs Fatihi Selahaddin Eyyubi | Gregor |

=== Movies ===
| Year | Title | Role |
|---|---|---|
| 2009 | Welcome | Koban |
| 2011 | Ay Büyürken Uyuyamam | Mert |
| 2014 | 8 Saniye | Tayfun |
