= Fırat (surname) =

Fırat is a Turkish surname. Notable persons with that name include:

== People ==
- Abdülmelik Fırat (1934–2009), Turkish-Kurdish politician
- Dengir Mir Mehmet Fırat (1943–2019), Turkish politician
- Duygu Fırat (born 1990), Turkish female basketball player
- Engin Fırat (1970–2026), Turkish football player and manager
- Ertuğrul Oğuz Fırat (1923–2014), Turkish composer, painter and writer
- Gökçe Fırat Çulhaoğlu (born 1974), Turkish journalist
- İbrahim Halil Fırat (born 1973), Turkish politician
- İdil Fırat (born 1972), Turkish actress
- Mert Fırat (born 1981), Turkish actor and screenwriter
- Nurhan Fırat (born 1972), Turkish karateka
- Salih Fırat (born 1960), Turkish-Kurdish politician
- Yusuf Emre Fırat (born 2000), Turkish cross-country skier
