= Fırat Akkoyun =

Turkish footballer

Personal information
- Date of birth: January 1, 1982 (age 44)
- Place of birth: Sarıoğlan, Turkey
- Height: 1.81 m (5 ft 11 1/2 in)
- Position: Fullback

Senior career*
Years	Team	Apps	(Gls)
2000–2002	Kayserispor	4	(0)
2002	Hatayspor	0	(0)
2002–2004	Erzurumspor	39	(7)
2004–2005	Anadolu Üsküdar 1908	12	(1)
2005–2007	Konyaspor	12	(0)
2007–2008	Osmanlıspor	4	(0)
2008	→ Diyarbakırspor (loan)		
2009	Karabükspor		
2009–2010	Alanyaspor		
2010	Istanbulspor		
- * Club domestic league appearances and goals as of May 27, 2007

Fırat Akkoyun (born January 1, 1982) is a Turkish retired footballer. He played as a fullback.
