= Fi (TV series) =

Turkish psychological thriller television series

- Genre: Love; Erotic thriller; Psychological thriller
- Based on: Fi by Azra Kohen
- Written by: Nükhet Bıçakçı
- Directed by: Mert Baykal
- Starring: Ozan Güven; Serenay Sarıkaya; Mehmet Günsür; Berrak Tüzünataç
- Composer: Cem Öget
- Country of origin: Turkey
- Original language: Turkish
- No. of seasons: 2
- No. of episodes: 22

Production
- Producers: Kerem Çatay; Pelin Diştaş Yaşaroğlu
- Running time: 60 minutes
- Production company: Ay Yapım

Original release
- Network: puhutv
- Release: 31 March 2017 – 9 March 2018

Fi is a first internet TV series in Turkey, the Turkish psychological thriller television series originally streamed online by puhutv. It is an adaptation of award-winning author Azra Kohen's trilogy novels Fi, Çi, and Pi. Its first season consists of 12 episodes which were released from 31 March 2017 to 16 June 2017. The second season started in October 2017.

Within 50 hours of the first three episodes being released, it reached 3.5 million viewers. The first 9 episodes reached 50 million viewers. According to statistics that were collected by various Turkish agencies, among the 48 million Internet users in Turkey, the number of users watching Fi at the time was 8 million.

The second season of the series have a different story than the books. This became a big problem for the readers and followers of Azra Kohen. The author canceled the series due to fact that the production company did not adhere to the original plot and depth of content of the trilogy and sue the production company Ay Yapim. The case is still in court (2022).

== Plot ==
In season one, the life of psychiatrist Can Manay is explained. Manay teaches psychology in college and also performs therapy on his own television program. He falls in love with Duru, a young and aspiring dancer, whom he meets by coincidence, but Duru has a lover named Deniz, a talented musician. Also where he teaches at school, he has a student named Bilge, whom he believes will become a good psychologist and he pushes her boundaries. On the other hand, Özge Egeli, an ambitious young journalist, is determined to reveal the dirty past of Can Manay.

== Cast and characters ==
=== Main characters ===
- Can Manay (Ozan Güven), the leading psychiatrist of Turkey and the host of the most watched television program. Can Manay's normal life changes when he meets Duru and falls in love with her.
- Duru Durulay (Serenay Sarıkaya), she is a conservatory student and her only dream is to dance and to be on stage. She lives with her boyfriend Deniz. Before finishing school, she is accepted to the New York Academy through Can Manay's help, who sends a video of her dancing on stage to the academy in New York. She has a strong sense of style with pastel shades and simple jewelry.
- Deniz (Mehmet Günsür), a university teacher and a composer who prepares dance shows. He has a conservative personality. Deniz lives with his girlfriend Duru.
- Özge Egeli (Berrak Tüzünataç), a journalist trying to reveal Can Manay's truth and at the same time a stubborn and powerful woman. The task of revealing the truth about Can Manay falls on her shoulder after her manager gets involved in an accident. She is a bisexual, but nevertheless has feelings towards Sadık Murat Kolhan. She thinks she should spend time on things that are more important than clothes, thus her clothes are usually simple.
- Bilge Görgün (Büşra Develi), a very successful student from the psychology class of Can Manay at the university. She is not a social person and is a coward. She has a poor life with a disabled brother and an all-time drunk father, but is also determined to protect her scholarship at the school.
- Eti Yönder (Tülay Günal), Can Manay's doctor and the woman who knows about his past.
- Sadık Murat Kolhan (Osman Sonant), the boss of a famous media company. Most people know him and Can to be friends, but in fact, Can was his wife's psychiatrist and was threatening Sadık with documents about her suicide. Sadık has kept Özge close to himself to reveal the facts about Can Manay.

=== Other characters ===
- Ece (Yasemin Allen) (Çi), Afife musical's main actress.
- Nilay (Nehir Erdoğan) (Çi), the woman that Deniz met in a cafe in Rome and fell in love with.
- Ceyhan (Jale Arıkan) (Çi), Afife musical's director.
- Ali (Emir Benderlioğlu) (Fi, Çi), Can Manay's private driver.
- Kaya (Hakan Atalay) (Fi), Can's assistant and closest company. Together with Eti, he does many things behind Can's back without informing him and for his sake.
- Göksel (Armağan Oğuz) (Fi, Çi), a dancer at the university. He has feelings for Ada, which he never reveals because of his problem in establishing relationships with women.
- Zeynep (Müjgan Ferhan Şensoy) (Fi, Çi), an employee at Can Manay's psychiatric center.
- Ada (Hivda Zizan Alp) (Fi, Çi), a music student at the university. She is in a platonic love with her teacher Deniz.
- Ceren (Merve Çağıran) (Fi), Duru's closest friend from her time at school. After getting handicapped, she went abroad for treatment and returned in the third episode.
- Doğru Görgün (Canberk Gültekin) (Fi, Çi), Bilge's crippled sibling, who is despised by his father but Bilge tries to take care of him as much as she can.
- Aylin (Defne Kayalar) (Fi, Çi), a journalist. She was supposed to interview Can Manay but after going through an accident she passes the task to her assistant.
- Murat Yılmaz (Efecan Şenolsun) (Fi), a university student and Bilge's schoolmate with whom she has a sexual relationship for a night.
- Melis (Tuğçe Baltalı) (Fi), Murat's girlfriend.
- Gülay Güzelce (Nihal Menzil) (Fi, Çi), the person who adopts and raises Özge after she lost both of her parents.
- Numan (Şahin Ergüney) (Fi, Çi), a retired police agent and the man whom Sadık is most close to.
- Furkan (Enes Atış) (Fi), a computer engineer that runs the magazine site together with Özge. He loses his life in the tenth episode.
- Alara (Nesrin Cavadzade) (Fi)
- Işıl (Sezin Akbaşoğulları) (Fi), Özge's friend and a lawyer. She enters the series in the tenth episode and helps with releasing Özge from the police station.
- Billur (Nur Fettahoğlu) (Çi), Can Manay's former girlfriend.

=== Guest appearances ===
- Sıla (Özge Özpirinçci) (Fi), Can's girlfriend in the first five episodes.
- Tuğrul Paşaoğlu (Burak Sergen) (Fi)
- Serra (Gerçek Alnıaçık) (Fi)
- Komedyen (Cem Yılmaz) (Fi), a consultant who thinks that he is no longer funny and who comes to therapy with Can Manay.
- Mithat Şahin (Özgür Emre Yıldırım) (Fi)
- Nazlı (Ece Dizdar) (Fi), a woman who works in a bank and enters negotiating about an art center with Deniz.
- Yıldız Kolhan (Songül Öden) (Fi), Sadık Murat Kolahn's wife. As her marriage to Sadık starts to fall apart, she goes to therapy with Can Manay and eventually takes her own life. Sadık makes her death look like a heart attack rather than a suicide.

== Format ==
Unlike the Turkish TV series that were broadcast in the same period, Fi was broadcast on Puhu TV, an online series platform on internet, with 60-minute uncensored episodes. Episodes of the series were published on Puhu TV's platform in 4K resolution Ultra HD and free of charge. Because the series was broadcast on the internet and there was no opportunity to advertise on the internet as it was on television, there were advertisements of some brands on many scenes of the series' episodes. Examples include a commercial for Vodafone labeled as "Vodafone Arena" in one scene, and Can Manay's decision to buy a Samsung phone after seeing an advertisement for the phone with the motto "removing the borders".

The main story of the series revolves around Can Manay, the main character, and tells the story of the transformation of all the characters over time. Writing for the media site MedyaBey, Şadan Kaba described Fi as a story centered around "Can Manay and other characters" and believed that producing the series in the format of 60-minute episodes would be an advantage as it would eliminate the risk of running out of time and material. In addition, the erotic scenes in many of the episodes of Fi were the subject of discussion on social media. Milliyet's writer Sina Koloğlu wrote in his article that while broadcast on television these scenes needed to change and suggested that the production team should make two different versions for this type of scenes.

== Series overview ==
Season	Number of episodes	Episodes	Start of the Season	Season Finale	TV Season	TV Channel
Season 1	12	1-12	31 March 2017	16 June 2017	2017	puhutv
Season 2	10	1-10	9 November 2017	9 March 2018	2018	puhutv

== Production ==
=== Development ===
In an interview, author of the novels series Azra Kohen talked about having met with many production companies about turning her books into a film or TV series and said that initially she did not want her books to be turned immediately into a TV series and had decided to wait for at least 5 years. However, after having a discussion with Ay Yapım she changed her mind. Ozan Güven said in a meeting in May 2017 that the project was first proposed 1.5 years ago and that the main cast had not been formed at the time but the project itself had been initiated. The author of the novels later mentioned that the novels had been written as a series of self-help books, which she did not except to be turned into a successful work at the time, and added that she had "already [written] the books with a visual perception" and therefore she had designed the storylines accordingly. The author also mentioned that the person who had changed her mined about turning the books into a TV series was in fact Pelin Diştaş, and said: "Apart from Ay Yapım, Pelin Diştaş was a quite important figure [...]". The author attended meetings held by production companies in order to recognize "different categories of people" until she came to Ay Yapım, and also added, "If it was not for this team, without the staff of Ay Yapım, there would have been no series made from these books".

When the project was announced online for the first time, it was referred to as "Fi Çi Pi" on social media, but Azra Kohen, the author of the novel series, said the series would have only one name. The official name of the series was announced by puhutv as Fi in March 2017 and the first promotional poster was published. Nükhet Bıçakçı adapted the novel series to prepare the screenplay of the television series. The first promotional video of the series was released on 10 March 2017. On 31 March 2017, the release date for the first three episodes was announced. On 25 March 2017, it was reported that telecommunication company Vodafone would sponsor the series, and it announced to its customers that they could watch Fi for 6 months without paying any internet fees.

In December 2017, author Azra Kohen appeared on Radyo Trafik Marmara's radio program Yazarın Dilinden and announced that the TV series would finish with two seasons in total. She added that she did not want the series to continue by saying that the series was planned to last 4 seasons but the second season had become deviated from the books and that the only thing remaining constant were the characters. In the interview, Azra Kohen said that in the first season "after the first three episodes the reference points had remained the same, [...], but they tell a completely different story afterwards". But the production company was planning to complete the project with two seasons from the beginning due to the lack of action in the first two books and Habertürk's writer Mustafa Doğan claimed that it was the production company, not Kohen, who had decided to finish the series earlier. Kohen, in turn, said that in the contract with the production company it was mentioned that "The series cannot in any way go away from the essence of the book and its characters and cannot go beyond its meaning" and she had taken the decision to terminate the series and also wrote a book about her experiences during this process.

=== Casting ===
The first choice to portray the character Can Manay was Ozan Güven since the beginning, and it was confirmed by Kohen's colleague Ebru, who stated: "We were so obsessed with Ozan Güven that we would have done anything to make him accept the role". The other two alternative choices for the role were Cem Yılmaz and Okan Bayülgen. Members of the main cast gave an interview to Vogue Türkiye which was published in April 2017. Ozan Güven stated that he had accepted the role "due to its different nature compared to the repeating monopoly of Turkish TV series".

Serenay Sarıkaya and Berrak Tüzünataç were on a vacation in Mykonos when they received the offer to portray two of the main characters in the series. Sarıkaya, who portrayed the character Duru, said that she had accepted the offer without even reading the scenario as she believed the role was "the first of its kind" and even convinced Berrak Tüzünataç to play the role of Özge. As she was about to portray a professional ballerina, Sarıkaya took dancing lesson for three months. Tüzünataç cut her hair short in preparation for the role of Özge. In their interview, Berrak Tüzünataç stated that she had convinced Mehmet Günsür to accept the offer to portray the character Deniz. Büşra Develi, who was chosen to portray Bilge, also gave an interview as a member of the main cast. Mehmet Günsür said that "In order to get into the mindset of Deniz, there's a need to understand his ideas first" and let his hair grow longer to make his appearance similar to that of the character.

The other two main characters, Eti and Sadık, were portrayed by Tülay Günal and Osman Sonant respectively. On 7 March 2017, it was confirmed that Özge Özpirinçci would appear as a guest actress in the first 5 episodes. Another recurring role was given to Armağan Oğuz, who portrayed Göksel. Cem Yılmaz made a guest appearance in the fourth episode of season one. In the tenth episode of the first season, two more actors joined the cast; Özge's friend, Işıl, was portrayed by Sezin Akbaşoğulları and the role of Sadık's wife, Yıldız, was given to Songül Öden.

=== Filming ===
After the main cast of the series was announced, a photo shoot was held in December 2016 to introduce the actors. The principal shooting of season one began in Maslak, in January 2017. The dance scene in the first episode, "Av ve Avcı", which features the character Duru (Sereneay Sarıkaya) as the main dancer, was choreographed by Zeynep Tanbay and its music was composed by Cem Öğet. The scene was recorded at Uniq Hall in Maslak. The principal shootings were later continued at Istanbul's neighborhood of Bebek and district of Nişantaşı. For the location of the university where Duru is a student, the Bomonti Campus of Mimar Sinan Fine Arts University was used.

The second season's shooting began on 15 September 2017.

=== Technical crew ===
The series was directed by Mert Baykal and Nükhet Bıçakçı served as the scriptwriter. The responsibility for styling was undertaken by Başak Dizer Tatlıtuğ and Deniz Marşan, but the name of the pair was not included in the main title for the first three episodes. The series was produced by Kerem Çatay and Pelin Diştaş.

=== Inspirations and references ===
The name of the series comes from the Greek letter phi, which is used to express the golden ratio, and is used as the name of Azra Kohen's novel on which the series is based on. In the second episode, Deniz (Mehmet Günsür) takes Duru (Serenay Sarıkaya) to a garden and presents her with a lemon tree as a gift. The scene was included as a reference to Serenay Sarıkaya's first movie Limon Ağacı (Lemon Tree).

== Music ==
Depending on the main subject of each episode, students studying at the Faculty of Fine Arts made and performed different types of music and sounds. But in general, the music of the series, including the main title's music were composed by Cem Öget. In the eighth episode of the first season, Dicle Olcay, accompanied by Deniz and other students, performed a piece called "Aç Kapıyı Gir İçeri" (originally performed by the singer Mavi). For the first season's finale Muhyiddin Abdal's poem "İnsan İnsan" was composed into a song by Fazıl Say and performed by Güvenç Dağüstün, Cem Adrian, Selva Erdener, and Burcu Uyar. The piece originally appeared on Fazıl Say's 2013 album İlk Şarkılar, and according to Burcu Uyar it had been initially prepared for a movie, but the production stopped and the movie got cancelled.

== Release ==
In January 2017, it was announced that the series would consist of a total of two seasons, each season consisting of 13 episodes, and five episodes would be published each month. In addition, it was added that multiple episodes would be published in one specific week, rather than releasing a single episode every week. On 31 March 2017, the series' premiere was held at Volkswagen Arena in Istanbul and after showing an 18-minute special preview, the first three episodes of Fi were released on Puhu TV. The first seasons's fourth, fifth, and sixth episodes were published on 21 April 2017. The next three episodes were set to be released on 19 May 2017, but at the request of Serenay Sarıkaya, the seventh episode was released on 5 May. Later, at a meeting with Ozan Güven and Tülay Günal, it was announced that the first season would contain 12 episodes. The first season's last episode was published on 16 June 2017.

On 16 August 2017, it was reported that the series would be broadcast on Show TV. On 21 August 2017, Vatan's author Oya Doğan reported on a meeting with Show TV's channel director Suavi Doğan, and announced that the series was to be broadcast after the conclusion of its second season, with 26 episodes set to be broadcast twice a week between March–June 2017. Ozan Güven later made a post on his Instagram account, stating that the second season would begin in September 2017. However, puhutv later announced that the new season would start on 9 November.

== International distribution ==
The series was broadcast and sold in various international Countries including Chile. The series became available digitally in Germany, Austria, Belgium, France, the Netherlands, and Switzerland via puhutv.

In October 2017, it was announced that Fi would be the first Turkish TV series to be broadcast in South Korea. From March to October 2020, the series were broadcast on ViuTV Six channel in Hong Kong.

== Cultural reaction ==
=== Critical reception ===
Habertürk author Mustafa Doğan wrote in an article that the series' storyline was under the influence of that of Fifty Shades of Grey. He also congratulated all the actors for their performance, except Berrak Tüzünataç. Writing for Vatan, Oya Doğan had a positive reaction to the series. She liked the first three episodes and sent the biggest applause to Mert Baykal for his talent in directing the show. Milliyet's Özay Şendir believed that there were only two veteran actors in the series and criticized the existence of too many sexual scenes. Sabah's writer Ayşe Özyılmazel praised the series by saying: "Musics, filming, acting, tempo, excitement, all are 10/10". Another Milliyet author, Nazlı Mengi, criticized the series and believed that "The film series of Mr. Grey's sex and love life remained even more innocent" compared to this series. A scene in the first season's finale was also subject to criticism, during which the character Duru gets out of the shower with make-up on her face. Writing for Vatan, Cem Ceminay believed that the focus on criticism should not have been on Duru's appearance while coming out of the shower, but instead it had to be aimed towards the response that she had made to her boyfriend's question over the phone.

=== Views ===
The first three episodes of the series reached 3.5 million viewers within 50 hours of publication. and this corresponds to a rating of around 8. According to the calculations, the number of views of the first 9 episodes reached 50 million. Out of 48 million Internet users in Turkey, the number of users who watched the show was around 8 million.

=== Popular culture ===
The scene showing character Can Manay drinking water in the first episode became subject of discussion in the media and the likes of Eliz Sakuçoğlu made comments about it. The appearance of Duru with a red feather in her head in preparation for her show was also much liked and discussed in the social media. The twelfth episode of the first season featured a scene during which the character Duru has a nervous breakdown and shouts "I worked the most". This scene was later turned into a popular Internet meme.

=== Awards and nominations ===
Year	Nominee	Award	Category	Result	References
2017	Serenay Sarıkaya	Pantene Golden Butterfly Awards	Best Actress	Nominated	
2017	Serenay Sarıkaya	Yıldız Technical University Stars of the Year Award	Most Liked TV Actress	Won	
