= Engin Akyürek =

Turkish actor (born 1981)

- Born: 12 October 1981 (age 44); Ankara, Turkey
- Education: Ankara University
- Occupations: Actor; author; screenwriter
- Years active: 2004–Present

Engin Akyürek (born 12 October 1981) is a Turkish actor, screenwriter and author. Akyürek began his acting career in the year 2004. He has starred in many acclaimed series and movies.

Akyürek received no official schooling for acting, stage or screen. Yet, he had a passion for writing and drama. He graduated from the history department of the language-history and geography faculty at Ankara University before he took part in the Türkiye'nin Yıldızları (Turkey's Stars) TV contest for acting. He was one of the stars of the contest alongside Beren Saat, who went on to become one of the most famous actresses of Turkish TV dramas. He received his first leading role in Bir Bulut Olsam, in which he played the role of Mustafa Bulut. His portrayal of the character brought the series into attention of audience.

Akyürek is well known for portraying many lead roles in TV series, such as Kerim Ilgaz in Fatmagül'ün Suçu Ne?, Ömer Demir in Kara Para Aşk, and Sancar in Sefirin Kızı. His role as Ömer in Kara Para Aşk led to him winning the best actor award in Seoul International Drama Awards (2015) and a nomination for best performance by an actor at the International Emmy Awards.

Apart from television, Akyürek has also starred in movies. His debut film was Kader, in which he starred as Cevat. He also played the role of Tekin in the film Bi Küçük Eylül Meselesi, written and directed by Kerem Deren.

Akyürek is also the brand ambassador of Shell and Disney+ Türkiye.

== Early life and education ==
Engin Akyürek was born on 12 October 1981 in Ankara, Turkey. His family is from Tercan, Erzincan, Turkey. His father is a government official and his mother is a homemaker. He has a younger brother. Akyürek graduated from the Ankara University Department of History in 2002, where he had expertise in languages and history.

== Acting career ==
"Acting is not just putting on a costume and saying your lines"

— Engin Akyürek

"I don't believe in luck, or chance. It is important to have talent and substance. Actually, luck, talent, and doing the right thing at the right time is what makes us. But, the most important, distinguishing factor is talent."

— Engin Akyürek

In 2004, two years after graduating from university, Engin Akyürek took part in the Turkiye’nin Yildizlari (Turkey's Star) TV competition. His first place win in this competition landed him a supporting role in the TV series, Yabancı Damat (2004–2007), produced by Yagmur Taylan and Durul Taylan. In Yabancı Damat, he worked with many cinema and stage veterans like Erdal Özyağcılar and Zeki Alasya along with young stars such as İlker Aksum and Binnur Kaya. He appeared in all 106 episodes of the show becoming a regular face for TV spectators. The TV series became popular in Greece as well, reflecting the warm Turkish-European relations at that time. The show began in 2004 and made its finale in 2007. His first film debut was Zeki Demirkubuz's Kader (2006). For his portrayal of Cevat in this film, Engin Akyürek received the "Most Promising Actor" award for both the Turkish Cinema Awards and for CASOD (Cagdas Sinema Oyuncuları Dernegi) Awards in 2006. Thereafter, he starred in the role of Nizipli Halim in the TV series, Karayilan (2007–2008), a story that took place in Gaziantep, during the French Occupation. Akyürek received his first leading role and played the male psychotic lover, Mustafa Bulut, in the Kanal D TV series Bir Bulut Olsam, written by Meral Okay and directed by Ulaş İnanc. His spectacular portrayal of the character brought the series into limelight.

From 2010 to 2012, Akyürek solidified his position in the industry when he played the male lead, Kerim Ilgaz, in Fatmagül'ün Suçu Ne?, a TV series about societal issues surrounding a rape victim. The original scenario of Fatmagul'ün Suçu Ne? by Vedat Türkali, is written by Ece Yörenç and Melek Gençoğlu for TV drama and produced by Kerem Çatay. He was in the lead role with his friend from the Türkiye'nin Yıldızları contest, Beren Saat. After a small break, he came and starred as the leading character, Tekin, in the movie Bi Küçük Eylül Meselesi (2014), written and directed by Kerem Deren. The movie takes place in Bozcaada. Thereafter, Akyürek returned to the TV screens and portrayed the character of Ömer Demir in the popular TV series Kara Para Aşk in 2014 for which he won the Best Actor award at the Seoul International Drama Awards (2015) and was nominated for the International Emmy Award for Best Actor. After Kara Para Aşk, Akyürek took a break from acting for some time and returned to small screen with his next series Ölene Kadar in January 2017. It was produced by TIMS and written by Elif Usman and Sevgi Yılmaz.

Akyürek's next projects were movies, first one being Çocuklar Sana Emanet (Children Entrusted to You) released on 23 March 2018. It was written and directed by Çağan Irmak and produced by Şükrü Avşar. Akyürek's next venture on the silver screen was the movie Bir Aşk İki Hayat (One Love Two Lives) in 2019. It was produced by Ay Yapım and written by Burcu Görgün Toptaş and Özlem Yılmaz, whereas Ali Bilgin did the direction. The movie was an adaptation of a Greek movie and was released on 13 February 2019. Between 2019 and 2021 Akyürek to the small screen with his series Sefirin Kızı (The Ambassador's Daughter) from December 2019 to May 2021. The series was a joint production of O3 Medya and NGM and was aired on Star TV, and was written by Nehir Erdem and Ayşe Ferda Eryılmaz and directed by Emre Kabakuşak. He starred in the series with Neslihan Atagül and subsequently Tuba Büyüküstün after Atagül left the show for health reasons. This was his second series with Büyüküstün.

In 2022, Akyürek starred alongside Tolga Sarıtaş in the film Yolun Açik Olsun (Godspeed), directed by Mehmet Ada Öztekin and released on Netflix. Akyürek made his OTT debut by starring in the debuting Disney+'s series Kaçış, in the lead role opposite İrem Helvacıoğlu. The story of the series was written by Akyürek himself. The first season received positive reviews from critics, and Akyürek received critical acclaim for both his acting and for writing the story of the series. As of 2023, he has a leading role in the series Adım Farah with Demet Özdemir. The dizi has been renewed for a second season after its international success and the 1st episode of the 2nd season was released on 27 September 2023.

== Filmography ==
=== Film ===
Year	Title	Role	Notes
2006	Kader	Cevat	Supporting role
2014	A Small September Affair	Tekin Bulut (Tek)	Leading role
2018	Çocuklar Sana Emanet	Kerem	Leading role
2019	Bir Aşk İki Hayat	Umut Atay	Leading role
2022	Godspeed	Captain Salih Çetin	Leading role

=== TV series ===
Year	Title	Role	Notes
2004–2007	Yabancı Damat	Kadir Sadıkoğlu	Supporting role
2007–2008	Karayilan	Nizipli Halim	Supporting role
2008–2009	Bir Bulut Olsam	Mustafa Bulut	Leading role
2010–2012	Fatmagül'ün Suçu Ne?	Kerim Ilgaz	Leading role
2014–2015	Kara Para Aşk	Ömer Demir	Leading role
2017	Ölene Kadar	Dağhan Soysür	Leading role
2019–2021	Sefirin Kızı	Sancar Efeoğlu	Leading role
2022	Mahkum	Mehmet	Guest role
2022	Kaçış	Mehmet	Leading role
2023	Adım Farah	Tahir Lekesiz	Leading role
2025	Bereketli Topraklar	Ömer Bereketoğlu	Leading role

=== Theatre ===
Year	Title	Role	Notes
2007	Romantika Muzikali	Ceto	Leading role

== Awards and nominations ==
Year	Award	Category	Work	Result
2006	Film Writers Association Awards	Promising Actor	Kader	Won
2007	ÇASOD Acting Awards	Promising Actor	Kader	Won
2011	Kadir Has University Most Special Names of the Year	Most Special TV Actor	Fatmagül'ün Suçu Ne?	Won
2011	TelevizyonDizisi.com The Best Awards	Best Actor	Fatmagül'ün Suçu Ne?	Won
2012	AyakliGazete.com Television Stars of the Year	Best Drama Actor	Fatmagül'ün Suçu Ne?	Won
2012	TelevizyonDizisi.com The Best Awards	Best Actor	Fatmagül'ün Suçu Ne?	Won
2014	TelevizyonDizisi.com The Best Awards	Best Actor	Kara Para Aşk	Won
2015	Uludağ University 10th Marconi Awards	Best TV Actor	Kara Para Aşk	Won
2015	Seoul International Drama Awards	Best Actor	Kara Para Aşk	Won
2015	International Emmy Awards	Best Actor	Kara Para Aşk	Nominated
2015	4th Crystal Mouth Awards	Best Actor	Kara Para Aşk	Won
2017	44th Golden Butterfly Awards	Miracle Makers		Won
2017	Peru Latina Turkish Awards	Best Actor		Won
2019	24th Sadri Alışık Awards	Ayhan Işık Special Award		Won
2020	3rd International İzmir Film Festival	Best Actor	Sefirin Kızı	Won

== Bibliography ==
- Sessizlik. Istanbul: Doğan Kitap, 2018
- Zamansız. Istanbul: Doğan Kitap, 2023
- İsimsiz. Istanbul: Doğan Kitap, 2026
