= Surel =

Surel may refer to:

- Surel, Ashok Nagar, Madhya Pradesh, India, a village
- Surel, an ethnic group of the Janajati people
  - Surel, a dialect of the Sunwar language spoken by the Surel people
- Hare Sürel (born 1983), Turkish actress
- Sébastien Surel (born 1975), French classical violinist
