= Berrak Tüzünataç =

Turkish actress (born 1984)

- Born: Birsen Berrak Tüzünataç; 2 November 1984 (age 41); Yalova, Turkey
- Occupations: Actress, Screenwriter, Producer
- Years active: 2005–present

Birsen Berrak Tüzünataç (born 2 November 1984) is a Turkish actress, screenwriter and producer.

== Life and career ==
Berrak Tüzünataç moved to İstanbul in 1995 with her family and attended Koç School. In 2004, she began studying Business Administration at Istanbul University. She worked as a presenter on Number One TV. She joined a model agency and took acting lessons at the BKM workshop.

=== TV series ===
She rose to prominence by playing the character "Vahide" in hit series Elveda Rumeli about Turks in Macedonia when the Ottoman Empire lost the most of its European lands. She also played in the period series Bu Kalp Seni Unutur mu?, a spin off of Hatırla Sevgili. She has acted alongside Engin Altan Düzyatan for many times. Their crime series Son (English: The End) was sold to the U.S., France, Spain, Russia, and the Netherlands for adaptation.

Tüzünataç also joined the cast of many hit series such as Filinta, Galip Derviş, Ezel, and Muhteşem Yüzyıl.

=== Web series ===
With Mehmet Günsür, Serenay Sarıkaya, she played in Fi, based on a novel series. She played in Dip alongside Neslihan Atagül and İlker Kaleli. She then appeared in Dünya Bu.

=== Film ===
Tüzünataç made her acting debut in Beyza'nın Kadınları alongside Engin Altan Düzyatan. She appeared in franchise comedy film Organize İşler. She played in crime film Ejder Kapanı alongside her Ezel co-star Kenan İmirzalıoğlu. Together with Düzyatan, she had leading role in Bir Avuç Deniz.

She played in Kıskanmak based on a classic novel. In 2013, she played in the historical film Çanakkale: Yolun Sonu.

== Filmography ==
Film
| Year | Title | Role | Notes |
|---|---|---|---|
| 2005 | Beyza'nın Kadınları | Figen | |
| 2005 | Organize İşler | Ebru | |
| 2009 | Ejder Kapanı | Ezo | |
| 2009 | Kıskanmak | Mükerrem | |
| 2010 | Bir Avuç Deniz | Deniz Demirci | |
| 2013 | Çanakkale: Yolun Sonu | Behice | |
| 2015 | Black Horse Memories | Zaria | |
| 2016 | Tschiller: Off Duty | Reyhan | |
| 2020 | Biz Böyleyiz | Emre | also screenwriter and producer |
| 2023 | Hayalet: 3 Yaşam | Aylin | |
Streaming eries
| Year | Title | Role | Notes |
| 2017–2018 | Fi | Ozge | |
| 2018 | Dip | Ekin | |
| 2022 | Kal | Beril | |
| 2023 | Dünya Bu | | Guest |
| 2023 | Terzi | Cemre | |
TV series
| Year | Title | Role | Notes |
| 2005 | Ödünç Hayat | Feyzan | |
| 2007 | Affedilmeyen | Duygu | |
| 2007–2008 | Elveda Rumeli | Vahide | |
| 2009 | Bu Kalp Seni Unutur Mu | Yıldız Akay | |
| 2010–2011 | Ezel | Bade Uysal | |
| 2012 | Son | Alev | |
| 2013–2014 | Muhteşem Yüzyıl | Mihrünnisa Sultan | |
| 2014 | Galip Derviş | Leyla | Guest role |
| 2015 | Filinta | Farah | |
| 2019 | Kurşun | Gülce Akar | |
