= Esra Kızıldoğan =

Turkish actress

- Born: 1980 (age 45–46); Turkey
- Occupation: Actress
- Years active: 1999–present

Esra Kızıldoğan (born 1980) is a Turkish actress. She portrayed Müge in the series Sefirin Kızı from 2019 to 2021, and played the role of Altun Jan Khatun in the historical drama series Alparslan: Büyük Selçuklu.

== Life and career ==
Kızıldoğan graduated with a degree in theatre studies from Istanbul University State Conservatory in 2001 and earned her master's degree in acting from Bahçeşehir University. After appearing on stage for various years, she made her television debut in 2004 with a role in the series Kadir Şinas. She continued her career with roles in the series Masum, Sultan, Leyla ile Mecnun, Bu Kalp Seni Unutur mu?, Zoraki Başkan, and Beyaz Gelincik. Her breakthrough came with her portrayal of Müge in Sefirin Kızı (2019–2021). In 2021, she was cast as Altun Jan Khatun in the historical drama series Alparslan: Büyük Selçuklu. She has continued her career on stage, with her latest role being in the adaptation of Talk about the Passion by Graham Farrow.

== Theatre ==
- Wit : Margaret Edson – Kent Oyuncuları – 1999
- Proof : David Auburn – Kent Oyuncuları – 2001
- The Blue Room : David Hare – Kent Oyuncuları – 2003
- Othello : William Shakespeare – Oyun Workshop – 2004
- The Other Death of Jeanne D'Arc : Stefan Tsanev – Oyun Workshop – 2006
- Macbeth : William Shakespeare – Oyun Workshop – 2010
- Hamlet : William Shakespeare – Moda Stage – 2013
- Talk about the Passion : Graham Farrow – Duru Theatre – 2019

== Filmography ==
=== Film ===
- Hacivat Karagöz Neden Öldürüldü (2006)

=== TV series ===
- Kadir Şinas (2004)
- Beyaz Gelincik (2005)
- Zoraki Başkan (2009)
- Bu Kalp Seni Unutur mu? (2010)
- Leyla ile Mecnun (2011)
- Sultan (2012)
- Hayat Şarkısı (2016)
- Bir Deli Sevda (2016)
- Sevdanın Bahçesi (2017)
- Masum (2017)
- Bozkır (2018–2019)
- Sefirin Kızı (2019–2021)
- Alparslan: Büyük Selçuklu (2021–2023)
- Tetikçinin Oğlu (2023)
- Ya Çok Seversen (2023) - Firuze
- Aile Saadeti (2025) - Öykü Yurtsever
- Başkalarının Hayatı (2026) - Perihan
- Şapkacı Kadınlar (2026—) - Fikriye

== Awards ==
- 2004: Sadri Alışık Theatre Awards, Best Supporting Actress – Othello
