= Serenay Sarıkaya =

Turkish actress and model (born 1992)

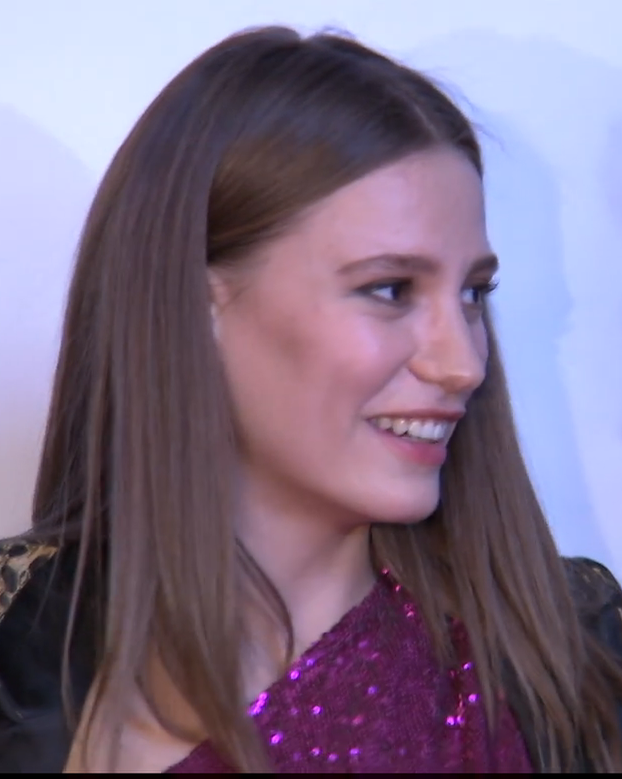
- Sarıkaya in 2019
- Born: 1 July 1992 (age 34); Ankara, Turkey
- Education: Ataşehir Adıgüzel Fine Arts High School, Istanbul (theater)
- Occupations: Actress; model
- Years active: 2006–present
- Height: 1.75 m (5 ft 8.90 in)

Serenay Sarıkaya (Turkish pronunciation: [seɾeˌnaj saˈɾɯkaja]; born 1 July 1992) is a Turkish actress, model, and beauty pageant titleholder. She is known from the TV series Adanalı, Lale Devri, Medcezir, and Aile. She rose to international prominence with her roles in the series Fi and Şahmaran.

Sarıkaya graduated from the theatre department of Ataşehir Adıgüzel Fine Arts High School in Istanbul. At the age of 14, she made her acting debut, with a minor part in the movie Şaşkın (2006), followed up with a part in Plajda (2008). Her first leading role was in the fantasy children's series Peri Masalı (2008). Her breakthrough role was that of Sofia in the crime comedy series Adanalı (2008–2010).

With Nejat İşler, she has appeared in the films Behzat Ç. Ankara Yanıyor and İkimizin Yerine. Since 2019, Sarıkaya performs in Alice Müzikali, a musical adaptation of Alice in Wonderland. She has received critical acclaim and won numerous accolades, including two Golden Butterfly Awards.

At the age of 15, she participated in a beauty pageant and received a special award from the jury at the European Youth Beauty Competition. Later, she became the first runner-up at Miss Turkey 2010. In addition to her acting career, she has appeared in various advertisements and is the face of numerous brands. In 2014, she was chosen as Woman of the Year by GQ Turkey.

== Early life ==
Serenay Sarıkaya was born on 1 July 1992 in Ankara to Seyhan Umran and Mustafa Sarikaya. She resided with her family in Antalya until the age of seven, when her parents separated. After her father's remarriage, she moved to Istanbul with her mother. She later described her experience of growing up without her father in an interview: "For a little girl, a father is a special factor in her evolution. Growing up without your father is a big experience". At that time, while she and her mother were deciding where to live, Sarıkaya knew she wanted to become an actress and a model, which influenced their choice to settle in Istanbul. Sarıkaya studied at and graduated from the theatre department of the Fine Arts High School. She did not go on to attend university.

Sarıkaya is an avid player of volleyball and also plays basketball, as well as having an interest in tennis and Latin dance.

At the age fifteen, she participated in the European Junior Beauty Contest held in Czechia and received a special prize from the jury.

== Career ==
=== 2006–2012: Cinema and television ===
In 2006, Sarıkaya got her first acting part in a film, Şaşkın, directed by Şahin Alpaslan. In 2008, she starred in a Turkcell commercial and then appeared in her second movie, Plajda, produced by Sinan Çetin and directed by Murat Şeker.

The same year, Sarıkaya obtained her first leading television role in the series Peri Masalı, directed by Celal Çimen, in which she portrayed a fairy godmother. She also appeared in the series Limon Ağacı, also produced by Çetin, and directed by Deniz Ergun. After the tenth episode, Sarıkaya's character was removed from the storyline.

Still in 2008, Sarıkaya began to appear in the TV series Adanalı, which was created by Tayfun Güneyer and directed by Adnan Güler. She played the role of a Greek-Turkish girl and received critical acclaim for her mixed Greek-Adana accent.

Sarıkaya competed in the Miss Turkey beauty contest on 1 April 2010, representing the national capital, Ankara. She placed as the first runner-up to the eventual winner, Gizem Memiç, who represented Gaziantep, and earned the right to represent Turkey in the Miss Universe contest. However, she dropped this chance, as she wanted to continue her acting career, and Memiç took her place instead.

Sarıkaya left the cast of Adanalı in its second season and went on to act in Lale Devri, produced by Şükrü Avşar and directed by Murat Düzgünoğlu. In one episode of the series, she sang a song that attracted audience attention and for which she received offers to record an album. In an interview, she stated: "The offers are correct. Fees aren't bad. But I'm not going to sing. My job is acting".

In 2011, Sarıkaya starred in the short film Hoşçakal. In 2012, she left Lale Devri, at the beginning of the third season.

=== 2013–present: Behzat Ç. Ankara Yanıyor, Medcezir, and other projects ===
In May 2013, Sarıkaya began filming Behzat Ç. Ankara Yanıyor, a movie adapted from the television series Behzat Ç. Bir Ankara Polisiyesi. In the same year, she appeared alongside Çağatay Ulusoy in the series Medcezir, which is based on the American show The O.C.. The screenplay was written by Ece Yörenç, and the series was directed by Ali Bilgin. Sarıkaya's character, Mira Beylice, was an adaptation of one of the original series' characters, Marissa Cooper. In 2014, she appeared in a Elidor commercial, alongside her Medcezir co-star Hazar Ergüçlü. She later became the face of Mavi Jeans after signing a two-year contract. For the promotion of their spring–summer collection, Sarıkaya shot commercials alongside Brazilian model Francisco Lachowski. Sarıkaya filmed another ad in 2016 for Mavi, with Barbara Palvin. For the 2015 spring–summer collection, Sarıkaya appeared in front of the camera with Kerem Bürsin, and their singing received a positive response from audiences.

In 2017–18, Sarıkaya starred in the show Fi, which is based on a series of novels by Azra Kohen. Fi was one of the first major Turkish television productions to be streamed online by puhutv.

From 2017 to 2018, she was the brand ambassador for Head & Shoulders, filming various campaigns and awareness projects.

In 2019, she made her theatrical debut as Alice with the musical Alice Müzikali, an adaptation of Lewis Carroll's Alice's Adventures in Wonderland. The show was first staged in February 2019 and returned for a second season in September 2019. After a break due to the COVID-19 pandemic, Alice once again returned to the stage on 7 February 2022.

Sarıkaya was cast to film the biographic Bergen, detailing the life of singer Belgin Sarılmışer. However, due to difficulties caused by the pandemic and other factors, she left the project. In 2021, she became the first-ever Turkish brand ambassador for Bulgari.

== Filmography ==
Film
Year	Title	Role	Notes
2006	Şaşkın	Itır	Supporting role
2008	Plajda	Aslı	Supporting role
2010	How to Train Your Dragon	Astrid Hofferson	Dubbing voice
2011	Hoşçakal	Sarah	Short film
2013	Behzat Ç. Ankara Yanıyor	Melisa	Supporting role
2016	İkimizin Yerine	Çiçek	Main role
Television
Year	Title	Role	Notes
2008	Peri Masalı	Talya	Main role
2008	Limon Ağacı	Peri	Main role
2008–2010	Adanalı	Sofia Dikkaya	Main role
2010–2012	Lale Devri	Yeşim Taşkıran	Main role
2013–2015	Medcezir	Mira Beylice	Leading role
2017–2018	Fi	Duru Durulay	Leading role
2023	Şahmaran	Şahsu	Leading role
2023–2024	Aile	Devin Akın	Leading role
2024	Kimler Geldi, Kimler Geçti	Leyla Taylan	Leading role

== Theatre ==
Theatre
Year	Title	Role	Notes
2019	Alice Müzikali	Alice	Main role

== Awards and nominations ==
Year	Award	Category	Work	Result
2010	Miss Turkey		Herself	Runner-up
2012	Turkey Elle Style Awards	Best Actress	Herself	Nominated
2013	Turkey Elle Style Awards	Stylish Hair of the Year Award	Ebb and Tide (Medcezir)	Won
2014	magazinci.com Awards	Best Actress	Ebb and Tide (Medcezir)	Won
2014	GQ Turkey Men of the Year Awards	Woman of the Year	Ebb and Tide (Medcezir)	Won
2014	Istanbul Technical University Awards	Best TV series Actress	Ebb and Tide (Medcezir)	Won
2014	5th Ayakli Newspaper TV Stars Awards	Best Actress in a Drama Series	Ebb and Tide (Medcezir)	Won
2014	Çanakkale 18 Mart University Awards	Best Actress	Ebb and Tide (Medcezir)	Won
2014	Karadeniz Technical University Awards	Best Actress	Ebb and Tide (Medcezir)	Won
2014	4th IMK Social Media Awards	Best Actress	Ebb and Tide (Medcezir)	Won
2014	3rd Crystal Mouse Media Awards	Best Actress	Ebb and Tide (Medcezir)	Won
2014	41st Golden Butterfly Awards	Best Actress	Ebb and Tide (Medcezir)	Won
2014	41st Golden Butterfly Awards	Best Performance by an Actress	Ebb and Tide (Medcezir)	Won
2014	41st Golden Butterfly Awards	Best TV Couple	Ebb and Tide (Medcezir)	Won
2015	Istanbul Arel University 4th Media and Art Awards	Most Admired TV series Actress	Ebb and Tide (Medcezir)	Won
2015	YTÜ Stars of the Year Awards	Most Admired TV series Actress	Ebb and Tide (Medcezir)	Won
2015	5th Unimpeded Life Foundation Awards	Best TV Actress of the Year	Ebb and Tide (Medcezir)	Won
2015	MGD 21. Gold Lens Awards	Best Drama Actress	Ebb and Tide (Medcezir)	Won
2015	Turkey Youth Awards	Best TV Actress	Ebb and Tide (Medcezir)	Won
2015	Ege University 4th Media Awards	Best Actress	Ebb and Tide (Medcezir)	Won
2015	Kayahan Media and Arts Awards	Best Actress of the Year	Ebb and Tide (Medcezir)	Won
2015	6th Quality of Magazine Awards	Top Quality Actress	Ebb and Tide (Medcezir)	Won
2015	42nd Golden Butterfly Awards	Best Actress	Ebb and Tide (Medcezir)	Won
2016	2nd Elele Avon Woman Awards	Actress of the Year	Ebb and Tide (Medcezir)	Nominated
2016	6th Elle Style Awards	Elle Style Actress of the Year	Ebb and Tide (Medcezir)	Nominated
2016	10th GSUEN Awards	Best TV/Movie Actress	Ebb and Tide (Medcezir)	Nominated
2016	7th İMK Social Media Awards	Best Actress	Ebb and Tide (Medcezir)	Nominated
2017	24th İTÜ EMÖS Achievement Awards	Most Successful Movie Actress of the Year	For Both of Us (İkimizin Yerine)	Won
2017	12th İTÜ Makinistanbul Media, Art and Sport Awards	Movie Actress of the Year	For Both of Us (İkimizin Yerine)	Won
2017	1st Turkey Children Awards	Best Television Actress	Ebb and Tide (Medcezir)	Nominated
2017	3rd Turkey Youth Awards	Best Television Actress	Fi	Nominated
2017	3rd Turkey Youth Awards	Best Movie Actress	For Both of Us (İkimizin Yerine)	Nominated
2017	4th Mersin Golden Palm Awards	Best Movie Actress Year	For Both of Us (İkimizin Yerine)	Won
2017	7th Life Foundation Awards	Best Actress of the Year	Fi	Won
2017	6th Fashion TV Mode Awards	Most Successful Actress of the Year	Fi	Won
2017	6th Ayakli Newspaper Awards	Best Actress	Fi	Won
2017	44th Golden Butterfly Awards	Best Actress	Fi	Nominated
2017	6th Bilkent TV Awards	Best Drama Actress	Fi	Nominated
2018	16th YTÜ Stars of the Year Awards	Most Liked TV and Movie Actress	Fi	Won
2018	12th GSÜ The Bests Awards	Best TV/Cinema Actress	Fi	Won
2018	Pantene Golden Butterfly Awards	Best Performance by an Actress	Fi	Nominated
2018	Pantene Golden Butterfly Awards	Best Actress	Fi	Nominated
2018	Pantene Golden Butterfly Awards	Best TV Couple	Fi	Nominated
2019	Elle Style Award	Best Performance of the Year		Won
2020	18th YTÜ Stars of the Year Awards	Most Liked Theatre Actress	Alice the Musical	Won
2020	8th Ayakli Newspaper Awards	Best Theatre Actress	Alice the Musical	Won
2020	Pantene Golden Butterfly Awards	Honorary Award	Alice the Musical	Won
2020	Golden Palm Awards	Best Theater Actress	Alice the Musical	Won
2023	ELLE Style Awards	Stylish Actress of the Year		Won
2023	Turkey Youth Awards	Best TV Actress	Shahmaran	Nominated
2023	Golden Palm Awards	Best Actress	The Family (Aile)	Nominated
2023	Pantene Golden Butterfly Awards	Best Actress	The Family (Aile)	Nominated
2023	Pantene Golden Butterfly Awards	Best TV Couple	The Family (Aile)	Won
2024	Pantene Golden Butterfly Awards	Best TV Couple	Thank You, Next	Nominated
2024	Produ Awards	Mejor Actriz de Habla no Hispana	The Family (Aile)	Won
2024	Golden Palm Awards	Best Movie Actress	Thank You, Next	Nominated
2024	Golden Palm Awards	Best Actress	Thank You, Next	Nominated
2024	Golden Butterfly Awards	Best Couple (with Burak Deniz)	Shahmaran	Nominated
