= Sefirin Kızı =

Turkish drama television series

- Genre: Drama
- Written by: Ayşe Ferda Eryılmaz; Sedef Nehir Erdem
- Directed by: Emre Kaşabuk
- Starring: Engin Akyürek; Neslihan Atagül; Tuba Büyüküstün; Uraz Kaygılaroğlu
- Composer: Gokhan Kirdar
- Country of origin: Türkiye
- Original language: Turkish
- No. of seasons: 2
- No. of episodes: 52

Production
- Production locations: Muğla, Turkey; Montenegro
- Running time: 125–165 minutes
- Production companies: NGM; O3 Media

Original release
- Network: Star TV
- Release: 16 December 2019 – 11 May 2021

Sefirin Kızı (transl. "Daughter of the Ambassador") is a Turkish drama television series directed by Emre Kabakuşak and written by Ayşe Ferda Eryılmaz and Sedef Nehir Erdem. It consists of two seasons, the first of which aired on 16 December 2019, and concluded on 22 June 2020. The second season premiered on 7 September 2020, and concluded on 11 May 2021. The series originally starred Engin Akyürek and Neslihan Atagül in the lead roles, but Atagül announced on 18 January 2021 that she would depart from the series due to leaky gut syndrome and was replaced by Tuba Büyüküstün.

== Cast ==
- Engin Akyürek as Sancar Efeoğlu
- Neslihan Atagül as Nare Çelebi Efeoğlu Işıklı
- Tuba Büyüküstün as Mavi Çınar Efeoğlu
- Beren Gençalp as Melek Efeoğlu
- Uraz Kaygılaroğlu as Gediz Işıklı
- Doğukan Polat as Yahya Efeoğlu
- Hivda Zizan Alp as Elvan Efeoğlu
- Cemre Öktem as Zehra Efeoğlu
- Zerrin Sümer as Feride Efeoğlu
- Edip Tepeli as Kavruk Ömer
- Gonca Cilasun as Halise Efeoğlu
- Özlem Çakar Yalçınkaya as Refika Şahin Işıklı
- Esra Kızıldoğan as Müge Işıklı
- Sami Aksu as Necdet Yılmaz
- Tülin Yazkan as Menekşe Yılmaz
- Nilüfer Kılıçarslan as Atike Yılmaz
- Yagmur Baskurt as Gülsiye
- İlayda Ildır as Dudu
- Duygu Karaca as Eşe
- Erdal Küçükkömürcü as Güven Çelebi
- Bülent Şakrak as Kahraman Boz
- Gözde Çığacı as Ceylan
- Erhan Alpay as Akın Baydar
- Deniz Işın s Sahra Yalçın
- Furkan Aksoy as Loki
- Ferit Aktuğ as Bora
- Şafak Başkaya as Sedat

== Production ==
The series was shot in Muğla and Montenegro.

The series was originally starring Neslihan Atagül and Engin Akyürek in the lead roles, But Atagül announced on 18 January 2021 that she would depart from the series due to leaky gut syndrome. Later, it was announced that Tuba Büyüküstün had replaced her. It was also reported that Uraz Kaygılaroğlu would depart from the series after a few episodes. His role later ended in Episode 37.

== Series overview ==
Season	Episodes	Originally released	
Season	Episodes	First released	Last released
1	17	16 December 2019	22 June 2020
2	35	7 September 2020	11 May 2021

== Awards and nominations ==
Year	Organization	Category	Nominee(s)	Result
2020	3. International Izmir Film Festival Golden Artemis Awards	The Best Actor	Engin Akyürek	Winner
2020	3. International Izmir Film Festival Golden Artemis Awards	The Best Actress	Neslihan Atagül	Winner
2020	3. International Izmir Film Festival Golden Artemis Awards	The Best Supporting Actor	Uraz Kaygılaroğlu	Winner
2020	3. International Izmir Film Festival Golden Artemis Awards	The Best Supporting Actress	Tülin Yazkan	Winner
2020	3. International Izmir Film Festival Golden Artemis Awards	The Best Child Actress	Beren Gençalp	Winner
2020	1. Cinemaport Awards	The Best Series Actress	Neslihan Atagül	Winner
