= Leaky gut =

Leaky gut refers to:

- Increased intestinal permeability, the phenomenon whereby the intestine wall exhibits excessive permeability
- Leaky gut syndrome, a hypothetical, medically unrecognized condition sustained mainly by practitioners of alternative medicine and some nutritionists
