= Berrak =

- Gender: Female
- Language: Turkish

Origin
- Language: Turkic

Berrak is a feminine Turkish given name. In Turkish, it means "clear" or "pure", often used to describe water, air, or clarity of thought. Notable people with the name include:

- Berrak Tüzünataç (1961–2019), Turkish actress
