= Gallipoli: End of the Road =

- Film poster
- Turkish: Çanakkale: Yolun Sonu
- Directed by: Kemal Uzun; Serdar Akar
- Written by: Alphan Dikmen; Basak Angigün
- Produced by: Taygun Aydin; Tolga Aydin
- Starring: Gürkan Uygun; Berrak Tüzünataç; Umut Kurt
- Cinematography: G. Mete Sener
- Edited by: Mustafa Presheva
- Music by: Mert Oktan
- Distributed by: Warner Bros. Pictures
- Release date: 14 March 2013
- Running time: 101 minutes
- Country: Turkey
- Language: Turkish

Gallipoli: End of the Road (Turkish: Çanakkale: Yolun Sonu) is a 2013 Turkish war film directed by Kemal Uzun and Serdar Akar. It screened as part of the Turkish Film Festival, at Ngā Taonga Sound and Vision, Wellington, on 23 April 2016.

== Cast ==
- Gürkan Uygun - Muhsin
- Berrak Tüzünataç - Behice
- Umut Kurt - Hasan
- Dean Baykan - Lt. Rush
