= Ali and Nino (film) =

- IM Global Advertisement Poster
- Directed by: Asif Kapadia
- Written by: Christopher Hampton
- Based on: Ali and Nino by Kurban Said
- Produced by: Kris Thykier; Sasha Harris; Alex Sutherland; Mairi Bett; Leyla Aliyeva; Pip Williams
- Starring: Adam Bakri; María Valverde; Riccardo Scamarcio; Homayoun Ershadi; Halit Ergenç; Numan Acar; Assaad Bouab; Ekin Koç; Connie Nielsen; Mandy Patinkin
- Cinematography: Gökhan Tiryaki
- Edited by: Alexander Berner
- Music by: Dario Marianelli
- Production companies: PeaPie Films; IM Global; Celtic Films
- Release dates: 27 January 2016 (Sundance); 27 October 2016 (Azerbaijan)
- Running time: 104 minutes
- Country: UK
- Language: English
- Budget: $20 million

Ali and Nino is a 2016 British-Azerbaijani war film, based on Kurban Said's 1937 novel of the same name. The film is written by Christopher Hampton and directed by Asif Kapadia. It stars Maria Valverde and Adam Bakri.

== Plot ==
During the Russian Empire, Ali and Nino fall in love. Ali is a Muslim from Azerbaijan who lives in the oil-rich city of Baku, in the family's Shirvanshir Palace. Nino is a Georgian Orthodox Christian whose wealthy Kipiani family also lives in Baku. Ali's friend, Malik, agrees to help bring the aristocratic parents to accept a marriage. World War I breaks out in Europe.

Malik and Nino go to the opera, while Ali and Nino agree to secretly meet afterward. Armenian Malik has also fallen in love with Nino and kidnaps her planning his own marriage to her. Prince Ali confronts and kills Malik with a dagger. Ali is injured during the fight and escapes to Dagestan to heal and hide out from Malik's powerful Nachararyan family. The Russian Revolution deposes Nicholas II of Russia.

Tamar is afraid no one will ever marry her daughter Nino and plans to send her to Moscow. Others have their own plans. Ever loyal Mustafa reunites Nino and Ali in the mountains. After a night of sex and with Nino's virginity gone, Ali yells out to call a Mullah. Mustafa assures the couple no priest is necessary for he can perform the marriage ceremony. Despite aristocratic childhoods, simple country life suits the newlyweds and they find true happiness. The Azerbaijan Democratic Republic wins its own independence.

Ali returns to Baku and gets appointed Deputy Foreign Minister. He begins to raise his young family in a free homeland. The young country signs friendship treaties with its neighbors but they fear the Bolsheviks in Russia. Learning that the Russians have amassed 30,000 troops on the border, the Azerbaijan government flees by train. As Nino and their daughter head toward Paris, Ali jumps off the train and blows up the bridge. Nino is safe but Ali gets shot and killed defending his country.

Epilogue text states that Ali Khan Shirvanshir died aged 24, Prime Minister Fatali Khan was assassinated 6 weeks later, it was 71 years before, in 1991, Azerbaijan reclaimed its independence, and Nino and her daughter escaped to Paris, but never returned to Baku.

== Cast ==
- Adam Bakri (Palestinian) as Ali Khan Shirvanshir - Azerbaijani - Muslim
- María Valverde (Spanish) as Nino Kipiani - Georgian - Christian
- Riccardo Scamarcio (Italian) as Malik Nakhararyan - Armenian - Christian
- Homayoun Ershadi as Safar Khan - Ali's father
- Halit Ergenç as Fatali Khan Khoyski
- Assaad Bouab as Ilyas Bey
- Numan Acar as Seyid Mustafa
- Ekin Koç as Mehmed Heydar
- Connie Nielsen as Duchess Tamar Kipiani - Nino's mother
- Mandy Patinkin as Duke Gregor Kipiani - Nino's father
- Parviz Mamedrzayev as Qochu
- Qurban Ismayilov as Kasi Mullah
- Jumshud Zeynalov as Yayha Guli
- Fakhraddin Manafov as Zeynalabdin Taghiyev
- Nigar Gulahmadova as Sona Taghiyeva
- Parviz Bagirov as Musa Naghiyev
- Mehriban Zaki as Sultan Hanum
- Rasim Jafarov as Ivan

== Production ==
Most of the film was shot in Azerbaijan, Turkey, Georgia and Russia.

== Reception ==
The film received mostly mixed-to-negative reviews. It holds a 40% rating on the film review aggregator website Rotten Tomatoes from a sample of 10 critics. On Metacritic, the film holds 50 out of a 100 score, based on 4 critics. The Los Angeles Times said, "Kapadia treats intimacy like exposition — time-passage updates mark every scene — leaving his leads to flounder against backdrops. There's zero chemistry or feeling to this sweeping, predictable endeavor, only the scent of what might have been." Godfrey Cheshire of RogerEbert.com gave Ali and Nino 2.5 out of 5, while CinaFilm gave the film 3 out of 5 (62%), based on 8 critical reviews.

Ken Jaworowski of The New York Times said that "[the film], adapted by Christopher Hampton (Atonement [and] Dangerous Liaisons) and shot in Azerbaijan and Turkey, rarely chooses a complex emotion when a straightforward one will do, though it does seek out ornate and grand images. Sure, beauty only gets you so far, but here that's quite a long way."

Ali and Nino was screened at the Sundance Film Festival where it was reviewed by Peter Debruge of the Variety Magazine, who said that "in this uneven return to fiction filmmaking, 'Amy' director Asif Kapadia struggles to convey the sense of tragedy that has made his documentaries so powerful".
