= Dip (TV series) =

Turkish television series

- Genre: Action; Adventure; Crime
- Written by: Başar Başaran
- Directed by: Uygar Kutlu
- Starring: İlker Kaleli; Neslihan Atagül; Bülent Emin Yarar; Berrak Tüzünataç; Lale Mansur; Defne Kayalar; Olgun Toker; Gün Koper; Gözde Türkpençe; Can Gox
- Country of origin: Turkey
- Original language: Turkish
- No. of seasons: 1
- No. of episodes: 8

Production
- Running time: 60 minutes
- Production company: TMC

Original release
- Network: puhutv
- Release: 30 March 2018

Dip (lit. 'Bottom') is a Turkish television series published on puhutv. The series is directed by Uygar Kutlu and written by Başar Başaran. It premiered on 30 March 2018.

== Premise ==
Sahir (İlker Kaleli), an officer trying to dissuade people from suicidal thoughts in a clinic affiliated with the Istanbul Police Headquarters, gets to know a scientist Bilge (Neslihan Atagül) because of a message. He also tries to get answers to some questions about his ex-wife Ekin (Berrak Tüzünataç).

== Production ==
=== Development ===
The project was announced as a web series in August 2017, and it was added that the series, titled İntiharcı initially, would be published on puhutv and consist of 13 episodes. It was announced in February 2018 that Uygar Kutlu was the director and the script was prepared by Başar Başaran. In the same month, the title of the series was finalized as Dip.

=== Casting ===
In March 2017, Beren Saat and İlker Kaleli met at Soho House in Asmalımescit, Beyoğlu, and later announced that they were working together on a new project. Later in April, the project was confirmed to be a movie titled Tren. When the deadlines for this project were postponed, Kaleli left the cast because he was involved in another project. It was announced in August 2017 that the new project was a web series. It was speculated that Kaleli would share the leading role with Cansu Dere and Beren Saat. However, it was announced in February 2018 that the other two leading actors in the series, other than Kaleli, were Neslihan Atagül and Berrak Tüzünataç. In March 2018, all the regular cast members of the series were announced. Bülent Emin Yarar, Lale Mansur, Defne Kayalar, Olgun Toker, Gün Koper, Gözde Türkpençe and Can Gox were also included in the list.
