= Senden Bana Kalan =

- Directed by: Abdullah Oğuz
- Written by: Levent Kazak
- Produced by: Abdullah Oğuz; Evren Oguz; Muzaffer Yildirim
- Starring: Neslihan Atagül; Ekin Koç; Sabri Özmener; Wilma Elles; Hakan Karahan
- Cinematography: Veli Kuzlu
- Music by: Yildiray Gürgen
- Release date: April 17, 2015
- Running time: 117 minutes
- Country: Turkey
- Language: Turkish
- Box office: ₺2.994 million

Senden Bana Kalan (English: What's Left of You) is a Turkish movie released on 17 April 2015.

== Synopsis ==
Ozgur (Ekin Koç) a young boy who has lost his parents since childhood was heir to his grandfather's wealth but there is one condition that he has to live a while in a village otherwise it will be donated to a charity. Ozgur will go to that village and he meets a girl named Elif (Neslihan Atagül Doğulu).

== Cast and characters ==
Actor	Characters
Neslihan Atagül	Elif
Ekin Koç	Özgür
Hayati Akbas	Tayfun
Wilma Elles	Emma
Silvyo Behmoaras	Gözlük
Gamze Pelin Gökçe	Merakli
Zeynep Kankonde	Saliha
Hakan Karahan	Avukat Hamdi
Doga Konakoglu	Tosun
Dila Pekdemir	Emel
Tayfun Savlioglu	Selman
Salih Özmener	Müdür Nihat
Bugra Özmüldür	Menfi
