= Ekin Koç =

Turkish actor

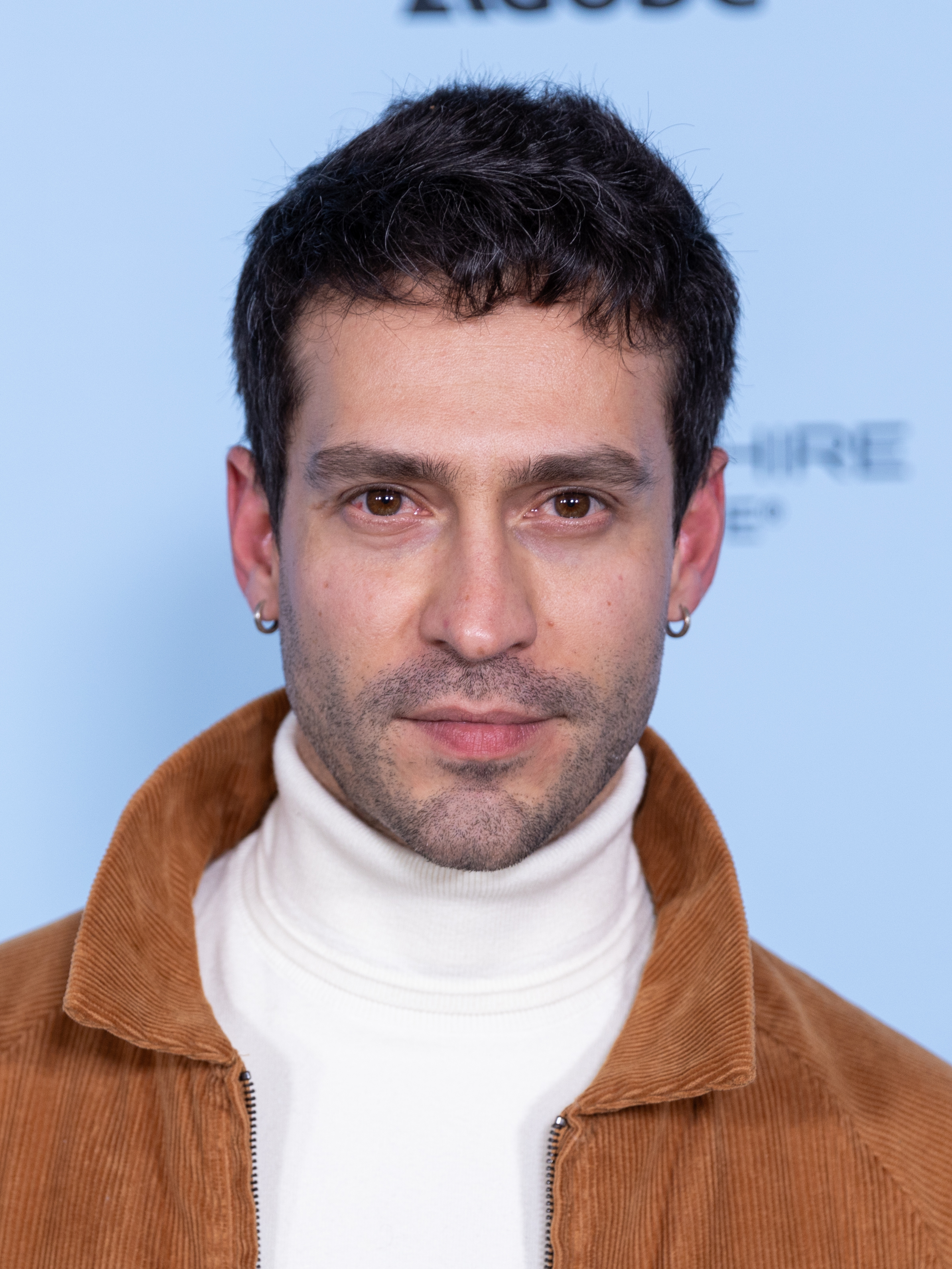
- Koç at the 2025 Sundance Film Festival
- Born: İsmet Ekin Koç; Manavgat, Antalya, Turkey
- Occupation: Actor
- Years active: 2013–present

İsmet Ekin Koç is a Turkish actor and musician.

== Early life and education ==
İsmet Ekin Koç was born in Manavgat, Antalya. His father is tourism professional Vehbi Koç and his mother is banker Sefika Koç. Due to his father's job, he completed his primary education by studying at different schools. He completed his high school education at Aldemir Atilla Konuk Anatolian High School in Antalya.

Koç left Antalya to study business administration (English) at the Istanbul Bilgi University, and started to study sociology online.

== Career ==
=== Film ===
His first movie was Senden Bana Kalan, which is the adaptation of the Korean movie A Millionaire's First Love. He played the main role "Özgür Arıca", for which he won an Ayhan Işık Special Award. Shortly after, he played the one eyed soldier "Mehmed" in the British movie Ali and Nino, in which Maria Valverde and Adam Bakri were the lead actors. The movie is an adaptation of Kurban Said's novel (1937) and premiered at the Sundance Film Festival.

He starred in the film Bizim İçin: Şampiyon, based life story of jockey Halis Karataş. He is producer and actor of short film App.

He went to Cannes Film Festival with films Okul Tıraşı, Kurak Günler and short film Büyük Uçuş.

=== Television ===
Koç had his first and main role in the fantasy series Sana Bir Sır Vereceğim in which he played a young man with invisibility power called Tilki - Kıvanç Gündoğdu. This role was his big breakthrough with his first partner Demet Özdemir. He and the cast of the TV series Sana Bir Sır Vereceğim performed the song "Sevsek Mi?", which featured on Bora Cengiz's album. Later, he played "Seyfi Yaşar" in the period series Benim Adım Gültepe.

Ekin Koç came to international attention for his role as Sultan Ahmed I, the 14th Sultan of the Ottoman Empire, in the TV series Muhteşem Yüzyıl: Kösem, which is based on a true story and where he once again met a co-star from Sana Bir Sır Vereceğim, Berk Cankat. In 2017, he played in Hayat Sırları as Burak Özer.

He portrayed Ahmed Sencer the Seljuk ruler of Khorasan, in the series Uyanış: Büyük Selçuklu. He later appeared in Üç Kuruş with a story about gypsies.

=== Web series ===
He played the character Kaan in the fourth episode of series 7 Yüz in BluTV. He played in crime series "Bozkır". He had guest role of series Succession in HBO as a businessman named Kadir.

== Filmography ==
Film
| Year | Title | Role | Note |
|---|---|---|---|
| 2015 | Senden Bana Kalan | Özgür Arıca | Leading role |
| 2016 | Ali and Nino | Mehmed | Supporting role |
| 2018 | Bizim İçin Şampiyon | Halis Karataş | Leading role |
| 2021 | Brother's Keeper | Selim | Leading role |
| 2022 | Burning Days (Kurak Günler) | Murat | Leading role |
| 2023 | Make Me Believe (Sen İnandır) | Deniz | Leading role |
| 2025 | The Things You Kill | Ali | Leading role |
Web series
| Year | Title | Role | Note |
| 2017 | 7 Yüz | Kaan Aykar | Leading role of episode |
| 2019 | Bozkır | Nuri Pamir Karagöz | Leading role |
| 2019 | Succession | Kadir | Guest |
TV series
| Year | Title | Role | Episodes |
| 2013–2014 | Sana Bir Sır Vereceğim | Tilki - Kıvanç Gündoğdu | Leading role |
| 2014 | Benim Adım Gültepe | Seyfi Yaşar | Leading role |
| 2015–2016 | Muhteşem Yüzyıl: Kösem | Sultan Ahmed I | Leading role |
| 2017–2018 | Hayat Sırları | Burak Özer | Leading role |
| 2020–2021 | Uyanış: Büyük Selçuklu | Ahmed Sencer | Leading role |
| 2021–2022 | Üç Kuruş | Efe Tekin | Leading role |
| 2024 | Taş Kağıt Makas | Umut Tanrıkulu | Leading role |
| 2026- | Muhtemel Ask | Kadir Emindag | |
