= Neslihan Atagül =

Turkish actress (born 1992)

- Born: 20 August 1992 (age 34); Istanbul, Turkey
- Education: Yeditepe University
- Occupation: Actress
- Years active: 2005–present
- Spouse: Kadir Doğulu (m. 2016)
- Children: 1
- Website: neslihanatagul.com

Neslihan Atagül Doğulu (née Atagül; born 20 August 1992) is a Turkish actress. She is best known for her role in Kara Sevda (2015–2017), a series sold to more than 110 countries and the first Turkish series to win an International Emmy Award. She had leading roles in the series Fatih Harbiye (2013–2014) and Sefirin Kızı (2019–2021), and in the films Araf (2011) and Senden Bana Kalan (2015). Throughout her acting career, she has received numerous awards and accolades, including the Academy Award for Best Actress at the Tokyo International Film Festival.

== Early life ==
Neslihan Atagül was born on 20 August 1992 in Istanbul. Her father was a driver and her mother a housewife. Her mother is of Belarusian descent. She studied theater at the Yeditepe University.

== Career ==
=== Early years ===
In 2006, she made her acting debut in the film İlk Aşk, for which she won the first prize of her career as "Promising Young Actress". Between 2006 and 2010, she got a role in the series Yaprak Dökümü based on the novel of the same name. In the following years, she appeared in other series such as Canım Babam, Kalbim Seni Seçti, Hayat Devam Ediyor.

In 2012, she was noted for her starring role in the film Araf, for which she won the Academy Award for "Best Actress" at the prestigious Tokyo International Film Festival.

=== 2013–2014: Fatih Harbiye ===
In 2013, Atagül landed her first leading role in the romance drama series Fatih Harbiye, alongside Kadir Doğulu. The series is an adaptation of the eponymous book by Turkish writer Peyami Safa, published in 1931, where she played Neriman Solmaz, a motherless young woman from the mahala who is engaged to her lifelong boyfriend until she meets Macit Arcaoğlu (Kadir Doğulu).

Fatih Harbiye premiered on 31 August 2013 on the Fox channel, but later moved to Show TV. It ran for two seasons and ended on 10 December 2014.

=== 2015–2017: Kara Sevda and rising popularity ===
In 2015, one of the most important and most beloved roles of her career would arrive, that of Nihan Sezin in the melodrama Kara Sevda, which became the first Turkish series to be awarded the International Emmy Award for Best Telenovela in 2017. The series also received the special jury award at the Seoul International Drama Awards.

Kara Sevda has become one of the most watched Turkish series in the world, being translated into more than 50 languages and broadcast in more than 110 countries such as Russia, Iran, Slovenia, Uruguay and Greece. During its broadcast in the United States for Hispanic community, it became the most watched non-Spanish series on the Univision channel.

She made her debut on online streaming platforms with the series Dip (2018) alongside İlker Kaleli.

=== 2019–2021: Sefirin Kızı ===
In 2019, Atagül returned to the small screen with the series Sefirin Kızı, playing Nare.

The series aired on Star TV for two seasons with a total of 52 episodes. It premiered on 16 December 2019 and ended on 11 May 2021, and for her performance she received the "Best Actress" award at the Izmir Artemis International Film Festival. However, midway through the series, she announced her withdrawal from the series due to health problems as she suffered from leaky gut syndrome.

== Personal life ==
Atagül started dating her Fatih Harbiye co-star, Kadir Doğulu, in October 2013. They got engaged in November 2015, and were married in July 2016. The couple welcomed a son in 2025.

== Filmography ==
Cinema
Year	Title	Role	Notes
2006	İlk Aşk	Genç Bahar	Supporting role
2011	Araf	Zehra	Leading role
2015	Senden Bana Kalan	Elif	Leading role
2023	Ah Belinda	Dilara	Leading role
Television
Year	Title	Role	Notes
2006–2010	Yaprak Dökümü	Deniz Başsoy	Supporting role
2011	Kalbim Seni Seçti	Melis	Supporting role
2011	Canım Babam	Pınar	Leading role
2011–2012	Hayat Devam Ediyor	Şirin Bakırcı	Leading role
2013–2014	Fatih Harbiye	Neriman Sölmaz	Leading role
2015–2017	Kara Sevda	Nihan Sezin	Leading role
2018	Dip	Bilge Koral	Leading role
2019–2021	Sefirin Kızı	Nare Çelebi Efeoğlu	Leading role
2022–2023	Gecenin Ucunda	Macide	Leading role

== Awards and nominations ==
Year	Award	Category	Work	Result	Ref.
2006	Golden Boll Film Festival	Hope-giving Young Actress	İlk Aşk	Won	
2007	Moscow 2morrow Film Festival	Now and Future Best Actress	Araf	Won	
2011	19th Golden Cocoon Film Festival	Hope-giving Young Actress	Araf	Won	
2012	25th Tokyo International Film Festival	Best Actress	Araf	Won	
2012	Pune International Film Festival	Best Performance	Araf	Won	
2012	45th Cinema Writers Association Awards	Best Actress	Araf	Won	
2013	16th Uçan Broom International Women Films Festival	En Young Actress	Araf	Won	
2016	16th Magazinci.com Internet Media (Bests)	TV Actress of the Year	Kara Sevda	Won	
2016	6th Ayaklı Newspaper TV Stars Awards	Best TV Drama Actress	Kara Sevda	Nominated	
2016	Seoul International Drama Awards	Best Actress	Kara Sevda	Nominated	
2016	MGD 22nd Golden Lens Awards	Best Drama Actress	Kara Sevda	Won	
2016	Golden Butterfly Awards	Best Drama Actress	Kara Sevda	Nominated	
2016	KTÜ Media Awards	Highest Rated Actress	Kara Sevda	Nominated	
2016	Ege University 5th Media Awards	Best Actress	Kara Sevda	Nominated	
2017	1st Müzikonair Awards	Best TV Actress	Kara Sevda	Won	
2017	Bilkent TV Awards	Best Actress	Kara Sevda	Nominated	
2017	Turkish Children's Awards	Best Actress	Kara Sevda	Nominated	
2018	Footed Newspaper TV Stars Awards	Best TV Actress of the Year	Dip	Won	
2020	3rd International Izmir Film Festival Golden Artemis Awards	Best Actress	Sefirin Kızı	Won	
2020	SE-SAM Award Ceremony for Those Who Carried Turkish Cinema from the Past to the Future	The Name that Carries Turkish Cinema from the Past to the Future	Herself	Won	
2020	1st Cinemaport Awards	Best TV Actress	Sefirin Kızı	Won	
2021	Soap Awards France 2021	Best International Actress	Kara Sevda	Nominated	
2021	Distinctive International Arab Festivals Awards	International Actress of the Year	Sefirin Kızı	Won	
