= Brother's Keeper (2021 film) =

2021 Turkish film

- Directed by: Ferit Karahan
- Starring: Samet Yıldız; Ekin Koç
- Release date: 2021
- Running time: 85 minutes
- Countries: Turkey, Romania
- Languages: Turkish; Kurdish

Brother's Keeper (Turkish: Okul Tıraşı) is a 2021 Turkish drama film directed by Ferit Karahan, starring Samet Yıldız and Ekin Koç.

== Synopsis ==
Jusuf is a Turkish Kurdish boy who is sent to an austere boarding school where only Turkish culture is taught. He encounters bullying and gets no help from his teachers when trying to get help for his friend.

== Cast ==
- Samet Yıldız - Jusuf
- Ekin Koç - Selim
- Mahir İpek - Headmaster
- Cansu Fırıncı - Hamza
- Melih Selçuk - Kenan
- Nurullah Alaca - Memo

== Production ==
Brother's Keeper (Turkish: Okul Tıraşı) is the second feature film directed by Ferit Karahan, his first being The Fall From Heaven. It was co-written by Gülistan Acet and Karahan, and produced by Kanat Doğramacı through Asteros Film and Flama Booking. It is a Turkish-Romanian production, Türksoy Gölebeyi was cinematographer.

The film is 85 minutes long.

== Release and reception ==
The film was screened online as part of the Berlin Film Festival in March 2021 during the COVID-19 pandemic. It was also screened at the Hong Kong International Film Festival on was 3 April 2021.

It was distributed by Intramovies.

Variety reviewer Jay Weissberg praised the performances and settings, but thought that the writing of the characters needed greater nuance..
