= A Small September Affair =

- Eylül Meselesi film poster
- Directed by: Kerem Deren
- Written by: Kerem Deren
- Produced by: Ay Yapım
- Starring: Engin Akyürek; Farah Zeynep Abdullah
- Cinematography: Gökhan Tiryaki
- Edited by: Aylin Tinel
- Music by: Toygar Işıklı
- Production company: Ay Yapım
- Distributed by: Warner Bros. Pictures
- Release date: 14 February 2014
- Running time: 106 minutes
- Country: Turkey
- Language: Turkish

A Small September Affair (Turkish: Bi Küçük Eylül Meselesi) is a 2014 Turkish drama film written and directed by Kerem Deren and starring Engin Akyürek and Farah Zeynep Abdullah.

== Plot ==
Eylül (Farah Zeynep Abdullah) is a young, wealthy woman who is dating a successful movie star, Atil (Onur Tuna). Though happy, she claims not to be in love. While travelling with her boyfriend, their car crashes. Both survive with minor injuries, but Eylül cannot remember the past month of September (also the meaning of her name). Unsettled, she travels with her best friend Berrak (Ceren Moray) to Bozcaada, where she had spent the previous "missing" month.

In Bozcaada, she meets a native man called Tekin or Tek (Engin Akyürek). Innocent and soft-spoken, Tek is a recluse due to his perceived ugliness. He claims they have met before and she fell in love with him. Unable to remember, Eylül encourages Tek to explain, which he does using his caricatures.

The film goes back and forth between the present day, where Eylül converses with Tek, and Berrak warns her somethings are better not remembered, and the previous month, where the relationship between Tek and Eylül develops.

In the previous month, Eylül was vacationing on Bozcada Island with her friends. Tek, who paints the caravans and signboards, fell in love with her at first sight. Gülşah (Serra Keskin), a little girl who is Tek's best friend, introduces them. Eylül, though flirtatious, initially thinks of Tek as "summer fun" and does not consider his feelings.

However, growing bored with her current relationship with Atil, Eylül decides to stay on the island on impulse and Tek continues to pursue her, inviting her to traditional breakfasts, sharing a sunset, going out dancing, and convincing her to postpone her return. One day, though Tek is unable to swim, Eylül convinces him to join her in the water despite his fear.

As their relationship develops, one night Berrak calls Eylül, but she does not reveal that she is with Tek, unable to admit her feelings to her friend. Tek is heartbroken upon realizing this, but Eylül then realizes she has fallen for him, and they make love.

In the morning, Eylül wakes up and happily starts preparing breakfast for Tek, but seeing her reflection in the mirror and realizing how much she has changed, she panics and calls Berrak to come to pick her up.

That night, Berrak, Atil and Eylül are dancing, when Tek approaches them and claims Eylül is his girlfriend. Eylül tells him that it is over, it was a "summer love" and she is leaving. The next day, when Eylül and her friends are about to leave with a floatplane, Tek comes to plead with Eylül one last time to stay, but she laughs at him and leaves. Heartbroken, Tek walks into the water and drowns.

With this final memory, Eylül's lost September is now restored. The crash happened because she saw an obituary in the newspaper for Tekin and in a panic, lunged at the wheel, insisting she had to go back. In the present day, diving in to the water, she finds Tek's pen, and writes in the sand that she loves him, as he had done for her earlier in the film.

Heartbroken, Eylül writes a note to the strawman in Tek's garden with his pen, creating a makeshift gravestone for Tek.

== Cast ==
- Engin Akyürek - Tekin
- Farah Zeynep Abdullah - Eylül
- Ceren Moray - Berrak
- Onur Tuna - Atil
- Serra Keskin - Gülsah
- Ege Aydan - Engin, Eylül's father
- Ebru Aykaç, Eylül's mother
