= Aile (TV series) =

Turkish television drama series

- Genre: Romantic drama
- Written by: Hakan Bonomo
- Directed by: Ahmet Katıksız
- Starring: Kıvanç Tatlıtuğ; Serenay Sarıkaya; Nejat İşler; Canan Ergüder; Nur Sürer; Levent Ülgen; İpek Tenolcay; Emel Göksu; Musa Uzunlar; Ayda Aksel
- Country of origin: Turkey
- Original language: Turkish
- No. of seasons: 2
- No. of episodes: 30

Production
- Producer: Kerem Çatay
- Running time: 120 minutes
- Production company: Ay Yapım

Original release
- Network: Show TV
- Release: March 7, 2023 – January 30, 2024

Aile is a Turkish drama television series directed by Ahmet Katıksız, produced by Ay Yapım and starring Kıvanç Tatlıtuğ and Serenay Sarıkaya in the lead roles. The series premiered on Show TV on March 7, 2023 and ended on January 30, 2024.

== Plot ==
Aile is the story of Aslan (Kivanc Tatlitug), a young man who is the leader of the crime family business of Soykanlar, runs a nightclub. Devin (Serenay Sarikaya), on the other hand, is a young, successful, and beautiful psychologist. Aslan and Devin meet each other on a flight to Istanbul.

== Cast ==
- Kıvanç Tatlıtuğ as Aslan Soykan
- Serenay Sarıkaya as Devin Akın
- Nejat İşler as Cihan Soykan
- Canan Ergüder as Leyla Soykan
- Nur Sürer as Hülya Soykan
- Levent Ülgen as İbrahim Soykan
- İpek Tenolcay as Neşe
- Emel Göksu as Seher Soykan
- Ayda Aksel as Nedret Soykan
- Esma Yeşim Gül as Ezgi
- Mert Denizmen as Tolga Sayıcı
- Abdurrahman Yunusoğlu as Turgut
- Ali Savaşçı as İskoç
- Umutcan Ütebay as Ekrem (Eko)
- Yüsra Geyik as Yağmur Akın
- Ozan Gözel as Ergun Akın
- İpek Çiçek as Ceylan Soykan
- Defne Piriçci as Zeynep
- Ege Yordanlı as Can
- Musa Uzunlar as İlyas Koruzade
- Rüçhan Çalışkur as Kıymet Koruzad
- Ushan Çakır as Ati

== International broadcast ==
The series has been distributed globally by Madd Entertainment

and sold to 140 countries around the world

and broadcast in various countries:

* Turkey: Premiered on Show TV on March 7, 2023.

* Israel: Broadcast on "The Mediterranean Channel" under the title "The Lion".

* Latin America & Brazil: Available for streaming on Max under the title "Aile: Lazos de Pasión".

* Spain: Broadcast on the television channel Divinity under the Spanish title "Familia".

* United States: Distributed for Hispanic audiences via Telemundo under the title "Aile: Bonds of Passion".

* Middle East & North Africa: Streamed across Arab countries via Shahid and MBC under the title "The Family".
