= Kopatchinskaja-Say =

Studio album by Fazıl Say & Patricia Kopatchinskaja
- Released: September 15, 2008
- Recorded: October 2007
- Genre: Classical
- Length: 67:21
- Label: Naïve
- Producer: Maja Ellmenreich & Stephan Schmitt

Fazıl Say chronology
Fazıl Say Haydn (2007)	Kopatchinskaja-Say (2008)	1001 Nights in the Harem (2009)

Kopatchinskaja-Say is the first studio album by violinist Patricia Kopatchinskaja (1977) from Moldova, and the 16th for pianist and composer Fazıl Say (1970) from Turkey. Recorded in October 2007 in Köln, Germany, it was released by Naïve Classique on September 15, 2008. Kopatchinskaja-Say features the music of Beethoven, Ravel, Bartók, and an original composition by Say.

== History ==
Kopatchinskaja and Say formed their duo three years prior to the making of this album. Both had heard of the other several years before working together and were following each other's careers closely. The pair also shares the same agent who ultimately brought them together. After Kopatchinskaja heard Say perform, she knew she wanted to play with him, saying: “‘I must work with this pianist at all costs!’ He plays like a composer, like someone who reinvents Beethoven, who has a genuinely creative approach to him.”

The pair performs between fifteen and twenty concerts together each season. Both have busy schedules as solo performers, and with other projects and ensembles. Each considers the partnership to be unique and important in their ‘artistic lives,’ and they often comment after concerts about the continued surprise and joy they find playing together.

== Concept ==
The album's goal is to emphasize Patricia Kopatchinskaja's exceptional skills as a violinist while Fazıl Say accompanies her on the piano. The concept was to choose pieces from Kopatchinskaja and Say's concert repertoire, and Say remarks in the album's liner notes that they wanted both “familiar and less well-known pieces.” Say considers the addition of Beethoven an example of the traditional classical music each finds so important, adding that these works are compositions they identify with very strongly.

Recorded at Deutschlandfunk Kammermusiksaal in Köln, Germany, Beethoven's “Kreutzer” Sonata was their first choice for the album. They practiced this piece, in particular, quite a bit; referring to it as an extraverted piece. Say said of the Bartók they felt like the "Romanian Folk Dances" were written for them and very easy to get into. Of Ravel's Violin Sonata, Kopatchinskaja noted how the “Blues” Movement was very exciting for Say. She stated that “The recording was actually already complete, but it was this take, with ashtrays inside the piano, that made it onto the finished CD. It was spontaneous, but it was the right one.”

Say maintains he didn't have anybody in mind when he wrote his Violin Sonata in 1996, but that Kopatchinskaja's interpretation is “unsurpassable.” He goes on to say that she “found a special violin sound for it. Many violinists have played it in the meantime, but no one in my view has done it as superbly as she does. She has actually made the work better.”

== Track listing ==
Ludwig van Beethoven (1770-1827) | Violin Sonata No. 9 in A Major, Opus 47 “À Kreutzer” (1802-1803)

1. Adagio sostenuto – Presto 10:15
2. Andante con variaziono 13:17
3. Finale: Presto 6:29

Maurice Ravel (1875-1937) | Violin Sonata in G Major (1922-1927)

1. Allegretto 8:19
2. Blues 6:17
3. Allegro – Perpetuum mobile 3:41

Béla Bartók (1881-1945) | Romanian Folk Dances (1915, transcribed by Zoltán Székely)

1. Staff Dance – Allegro moderato 1:16
2. Sash Dance – Allegro 00:31
3. Stamping Dance – Andante 1:21
4. Dance from Bucium – Molto moderato 1:15
5. Romanian Polka – Allegro 00:29
6. Quick Dance – Andante 00:54

Fazıl Say (1970) | Violin Sonata, Opus 7 (1996)

1. I. Melancholy 3:21
2. II. Grotesque 2:07
3. III. Perpetuum mobile 1:44
4. IV. Anonymous 3:09
5. V. Melancholy 3:07

== Personnel ==
- Fazıl Say – Pianist and Composer
- Patricia Kopatchinskaja – Violinist
- Maja Ellmenreich – Executive Producer, Deutschlandfunk
- Stephan Schmidt – Recording Producer and Editor
- Michael Morawietz – Sound Engineer
- Alexander Dorniak – Assistant
- Didier Martin – Director, Naïve Classique
- Marco Borggreve/Naïve – Album Cover Photo
- Naïve – Album Cover Art
- Manuel Brug – Liner Notes Interview
- Michel Chasteu – French Interview Translation
- Charles Johnson – English Interview Translation
- Eray Aytimur – Turkish Interview Translation
