= Haydn Piano Sonatas (album) =

2007 recording of five Haydn piano sonatas

Studio album by Fazıl Say
- Released: February 20, 2007
- Recorded: July 2006
- Genre: Classical
- Length: 58:25
- Label: Naïve
- Producer: Jean-Pierre Loisil

Fazıl Say chronology
Beethoven Sonatas for Piano (2005)	Haydn Piano Sonatas (2007)	Live in Tokyo (2006)

Haydn Piano Sonatas is the fourteenth album by Turkish pianist and composer Fazıl Say. It was recorded in July 2006 in Théâtre des Quatre Saisons in Gradignan, France, and was released by Naïve Classique on 20 February 2007. Haydn Piano Sonatas features five piano sonatas by composer Joseph Haydn (1732).

== Sonatas ==
1. Piano Sonata D major, Hob. XVI/37: I. Allegro con brio, II. Largo e sostenuto, III. Finale: Presto ma non troppo
2. Piano Sonata A-flat major, Hob. XVI/43: I. Moderato, II. Menuet, III. Rondo – Presto
3. Piano Sonata C major, XVI/35: I. Allegro con brio, II. Adagio, III. Finale – Presto
4. Piano Sonata E major, XVI/31: I. Moderato, II. Allegretto, III. Finale – Presto
5. Piano Sonata C major, XVI/10: I. Moderato, II. Menuet, III. Finale – presto

== Personnel ==
- Fazıl Say – pianist
- Jean-Pierre Loisil – recording producer
- Laure Casenave-Péré – sound engineer and editing
- Didier Martin – director, Naïve Classique
- Richard Davis – album cover photo
- Naïve – album cover art
- Michel Chasteau – French commentary and biography translation
- Charles Johnston – English commentary and biography translation

== See also ==
- List of solo piano compositions by Joseph Haydn
