= Poyraz Karayel =

- Genre: Drama; Action; Romance; Thriller
- Written by: Ethem Özışık
- Directed by: Çağrı Vila Lostuvalı (seasons 1 and 2) Osman Taşci (season 3)
- Starring: İlker Kaleli; Burçin Terzioğlu; Musa Uzunlar
- Country of origin: Turkey
- Original language: Turkish
- No. of seasons: 3
- No. of episodes: 82

Production
- Producer: Hayri Aslan
- Production location: Istanbul
- Running time: 120-150 minutes
- Production company: Limon Film

Original release
- Network: Kanal D
- Release: 7 January 2015 – 1 March 2017

Related
- Poyraz Karayel: Küresel Sermaye (movie)

Poyraz Karayel is a Turkish drama television series that was broadcast on Kanal D from 2015 to 2017. It stars İlker Kaleli as Poyraz Karayel and Burçin Terzioğlu as Ayşegül Umman.

== Plot ==
=== Season 1 ===
Poyraz meets Aysegul in a taxi and further in the episodes he falls in love with her. However he doesn't know that Aysegul is Bahri Umman's daughter, which although he finds out he decides not to tell Aysegul that he is working with her father. Further in season 1 Poyraz finds out that the chief police 'Mumtaz' has lied to him and that it was Mumtaz's fault that he got blamed of committing a crime. He then also finds out that the person that gave Mumtaz the command to pull Poyraz in this trap was his father in law Unsal. In the meantime Bahri Umman finds out that his daughter and Poyraz are together, which leads to chaos.

=== Season 2 ===
In the second season of Poyraz Karayel, Poyraz's sister Meltem Karayel is introduced. Further in the season Poyraz and the other characters find out that the man that they know as Poyraz's dad is actually his step father. Poyraz then finds out that his actual father is Adil Topal and that Adil Topal is Bahri Umman's enemy from 30 years ago. This then leads to Poyraz and the crew to get revenge from Adil Topal who dies soon in season 2. However the death of Adil Topal doesn't leave the Umman household with a happy end as after Adil Topal's son, Poyraz's half brother Neset Topal, replaces his fathers place and starts to sell drugs abroad. He also has psychological problems and has a onesided love towards Aysegul. The second seasons carries on with Poyraz and his crew to stop and kill Neset, which they finally do. However, not everything ends as they wish as at the end of season 2 Poyraz is shot dead.

=== Season 3 ===
Poyraz wasn't dead. He returns to Istanbul after being held hostage for two years by a terrorist group he had been investigating. He comes back right on the day of Aysegul's wedding. Things will take a strange turn, because both Poyraz and Aysegul feel like they have been betrayed by the other. After a series of arguments and confessions, the two of them reunite and Aysegul manages to get a divorce. They get engaged. Zulficar and Meltem eventually have three children, Aysegul is murdered by her former mother-in-law and Poyraz goes insane. Bahri dies a few months after Aysegul's death, leaving Sadretin as the head of the Istanbul mafia.

== Cast ==
Actor/Actress	Character	Episodes
İlker Kaleli	Ahmet Poyraz Karayel	1-82
Burçin Terzioğlu	Müzeyyen Ayşegül Umman Çilingir	1-82
Musa Uzunlar	Bahri Umman	1-82
Şebnem Hassanisoughi	Begüm Özbakan	16- 62
Ali İl	Sadreddin Umman	1-82
Özkan Uğur	İsmail Karayel/Adil Topal	28- 42
Ataberk Mutlu	Sinan Karayel	1-82
Kanbolat Görkem Arslan	Sefer Kılıçaslan	1- 46
Celil Nalçakan	Zülfikar Ülger	1-82
Emel Çölgeçen	Sema Koral	1- 62
Murat Daltaban	Mümtaz Tok	1- 24/ 64–82
Ece Özdikici	Songül Umman	1-82
Cem Cücenoğlu	Taş Kafa	1-82
İsmail Düvenci	Cevher Albay	1-82
Gülçin Hatıhan	Ümran	1-82
Emirhan Akbaba	İsa	1-82
Murat Prosçiler	Ufuk Kantar	24- 32
Hare Sürel	Meltem Karayel	26–82
Fırat Çelik	Mete Durukan	25–37

=== Completed characters ===
Actor/Actress	Character	Episodes
Kirkor Dinçkayıkçı	İsmail Karagül	1-24
Engin Benli	Zafer Biryol	1-24
Emir Özden	Oğuz Ayaz	16–21
Enis Yıldız	Necdet	1-21
Emir Bozkurt	Bülent	1–10
Halil Karaata	Kulaksız Adnan	1–9
Onur Kırat	Serkan Vadar	1–2
Volkan Bora Dilek	Gürkan	1–2
Nuri Tanır	Cemil	1
Macit Koper	Adil Topal	40–50
Semih Eraslan	Selçuk Erensoy	36–49

== Series overview ==
Season	No. of episodes	Originally broadcast (Turkey)	
Season	No. of episodes	Series premiere	Series finale
1	24	7 January 2015	17 June 2015
2	38	30 September 2015	15 June 2016
3	20	12 October 2016	1 March 2017
