= Özlem Yılmaz =

Turkish actress

- Born: 17 July 1986 (age 40); Bakırköy, Istanbul, Turkey
- Occupation: Actress
- Years active: 2006–2018
- Spouse: Ahmet Ayar (m. 2013; div. 2015)

Özlem Yılmaz (born 17 July 1986) is a Turkish actress.

Born and raised in Istanbul, Yılmaz's family is from Rize. She started her education at Kartaltepe Primary School and later studied at Ataköy Republic High School. She then enrolled in Kültür College. After finishing her studies, she decided to pursue a career in acting. Besides taking acting classes, she was trained by Müşfik Kenter but was forced to take a break due to her father's death. A year later she continued her studies at the Müjdat Gezen Art School and in 2006 graduated from Müjdat Gezen Actor Studio.

Yılmaz started her television career in 2006 and made her cinematic debut in 2013 with a role in Kudret Sabancı's movie Karaoğlan. She is best known for her roles in series such as Unutulmaz, Zoraki Koca, Kaçak, and Kara Ekmek.

== Filmography ==
Film
Year	Title	Role
2013	Karaoğlan	Çise Hatun
Television
Year	Title	Role
2006	Karagümrük Yanıyor	Elmas
2006	Felek Ne Demek	Tülay
2006	Rüyalarda Buluşuruz	Emine
2007	Dicle	Lal
2007	Zoraki Koca	Ayşe
2008	Dantel	Firuze
2008	Servet Avcısı	Zeynep
2009–2011	Unutulmaz	Eda Güler
2011	Dedektif Memoli	Ezo
2013–2014	Kaçak	Nurgül Hakeri
2014	Emanet	Zelal
2015	Kara Ekmek	Asiye Alsancak - Selen Belenoğlu
2018	Ağlama Anne	Damla Fırıncıoğlu
