= Son (TV series) =

- Written by: Berkun Oya
- Directed by: Uluç Bayraktar
- Starring: Yiğit Özşener; Nehir Erdoğan; Erkan Can; Berrak Tüzünataç; Engin Altan Düzyatan
- Theme music composer: Toygar Işıklı
- Country of origin: Turkey
- Original language: Turkish
- No. of seasons: 1
- No. of episodes: 25

Production
- Producer: Kerem Çatay
- Running time: 90 minutes (average)
- Production company: Ay Yapım

Original release
- Network: ATV
- Release: January 9 – June 25, 2012

Son (English: The End), is a Turkish psychological thriller series produced by Ay Yapım, broadcast on ATV and directed by Ezel's director Uluç Bayraktar. Starring actors are Yiğit Özşener, Nehir Erdoğan, Erkan Can, Berrak Tüzünataç, and Engin Altan Düzyatan.

The series has been sold to 20th Century Fox Television in the United States and was adapted into a pilot named Runner for ABC. No series has been ordered from this pilot, Also the rights to produce local versions of the series have been sold in Russia, Spain and France. In the Netherlands, the remake Flight HS13 was released in 2018.

== International broadcasts ==
Country	Network	Premiere date	Original name
North Cyprus	ATV	January 9, 2012	Son
Sweden	SVT	January 7, 2013	Lögnen
Greece	ANT1	January 28, 2013	Το τέλος
Kazakhstan	31 Kanal	April 29, 2013	Шегініс
Pakistan	Express Entertainment	June 11, 2013	Yeh Hai Meri Kahani
Hungary	TV2	July 17, 2013	Hazugságok gyűrűjében
Bulgaria	Diema Family	September 13, 2013	Край или начало
Georgia	Rustavi 2	January 10, 2014	დასასრული
Arab World	MBC 4	February 2, 2014	لغز الماضي
Albania	Klan TV	September 15, 2014	Fundi
Malaysia	Astro Bella	April 21, 2015	The End
Mexico	TV Azteca	2019	El engaño
Romania	Timeless Drama Channel	2019	Sfârșitul
Remake
Country	Network	Premiere date	Original Name
Netherlands	NPO 3	September 4, 2016	Vlucht HS13
Spain	Telecinco	November 28, 2017	El accidente
