= Burcu Uyar =

Turkish soprano

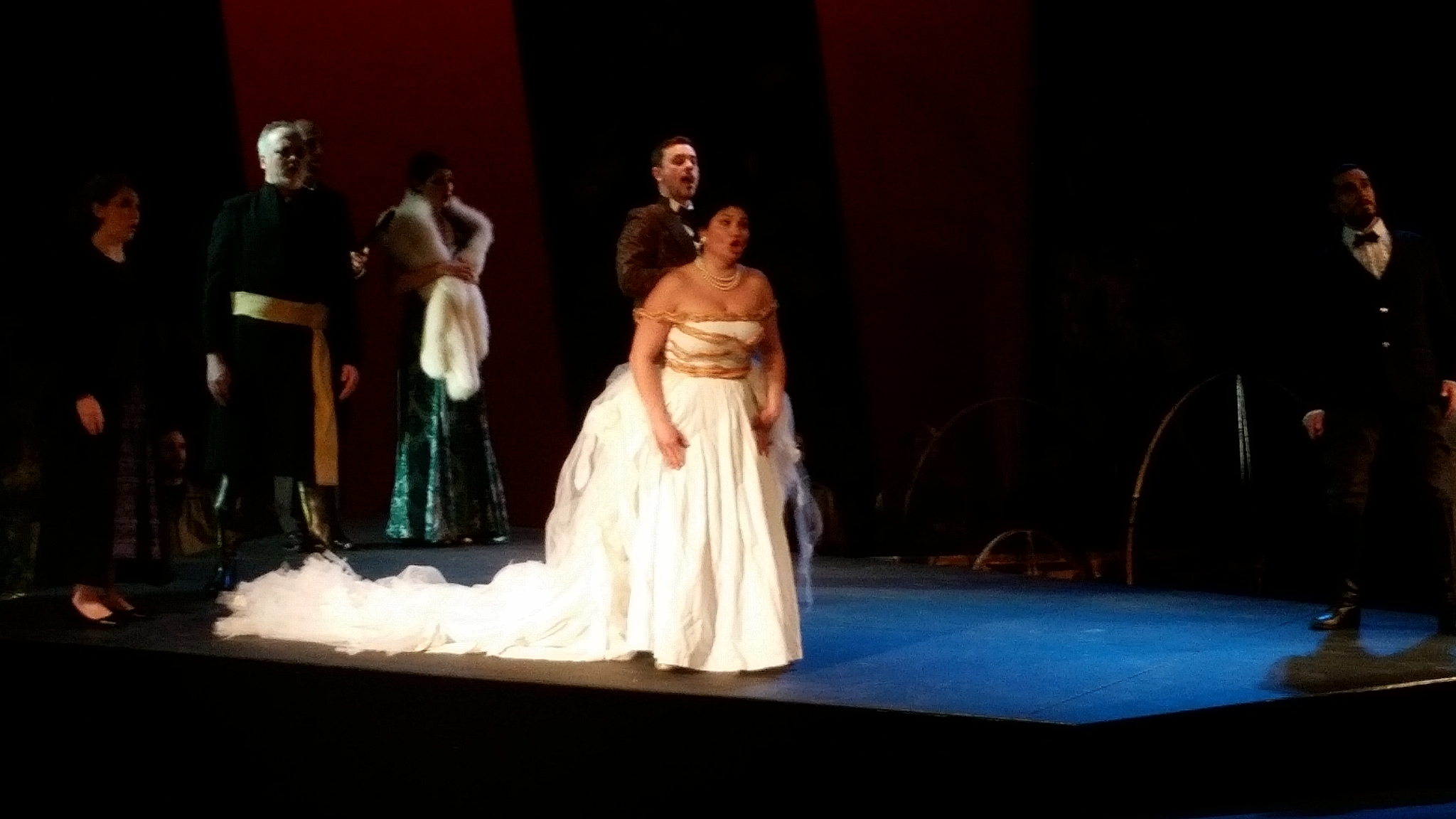
Uyar during the performance of Lucia di Lammermoor at the Massy opera in February 2016

Burcu Uyar (born 15 February 1978, Sivas, Turkey) is a Turkish soprano who has performed with the Israeli Opera and Deutsche Oper Berlin. Uyar, who was born in Turkey, received her vocal training in Turkey and has appeared in opera performances throughout the world including in İzmir, Nantes, Dijon, Düsseldorf, Mannheim, Padova and Marseille.

In 2012, she performed in the Israeli Opera's production of Donizetti's Lucia di Lammermoor. Other roles in her repertoire include Donna Anna in Mozart's Don Giovanni, Gilda in Verdi's Rigoletto, Olympia in Les Contes d'Hoffmann by German-born French composer Jacques Offenbach, the title role in Massenet's Manon and the Queen of the Night in Die Zauberflöte. In 2018, she performed in La Traviata at the 9th International Istanbul Opera Festival and also at a performance commemorating the 10th anniversary of Turkish soprano Leyla Gencer's death.

Uyar performed the coloratura soprano vocals in "İnsan İnsan", a centuries-old poem by Alevi poet Muhyiddin Abdal that was set to music by Turkish composer Fazıl Say.
