= Puhutv =

Turkish entertainment company

puhutv
- Website type: Video on demand
- Available in: Turkish
- Owner: Doğuş Media Group
- Website: http://www.puhutv.com/
- Registration: Optional
- Users: 11 million monthly active users
- Launched: December 2016
- Current status: Active

puhutv is a Turkish entertainment and video on demand launched in December, 2016 in Istanbul. It is owned by Doğuş Media Group and offers variety of Turkish TV series. Puhutv entered the content-production industry in 2017, debuting its first series, Fi.

All the content is free and ad-supported, there is no paid version. Registration is optional, also Facebook login is available.

== List of original content ==
- Fi / Çi (2017–2018)
- Dip (2018)
- Şahsiyet (2018)

== History ==
Doğuş Group previously launched a similar service called "Sipru" in 2007. "Sipru TV" has been shut down a few years later, however "Sipru RD" for radio service is still available as an iOS application.

== Competitors ==
After the web site launched, similar services followed. Doğan Media Group opened netd about one month after. Also, Apple iTunes Store opened for Turkey in December 4, 2012 only for music and films. TTNET also has a similar subscription-based service, Tivibu.
