= Hare Sürel =

Turkish actress

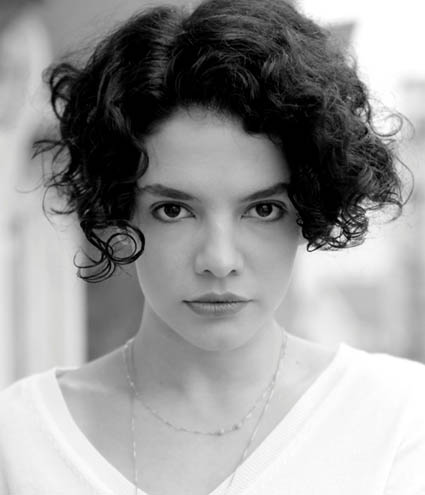
- Born: 5 March 1983 (age 43); Istanbul, Turkey
- Education: Marmara University; Istanbul University
- Occupation: Actress
- Years active: 2000–present
- Height: 175 cm (5 ft 9 in)
- Spouse: Oğuz Erdin (m. 2026)

Hare Sürel (born 5 March 1983) is a Turkish actress.

She was born in 1983 in Istanbul. Her family is originally from Samsun. She became interested in acting while in secondary school. Sürel graduated from Istanbul University State Conservatory with a degree in theatre studies. She received her master's from Marmara University.

She started her career in 2000. Between 2013 and 2014, she was cast in the teen drama series Medcezir as Leyla. In 2015, she appeared in the movie Bir Varmış Bir Yokmuş alongside Mert Fırat and Melisa Sözen. In the same year, she joined the cast of Kanal D TV series Poyraz Karayel, portraying the character of Meltem Karayel. In 2019, she was cast in the Show TV series Çukur.

== Filmography ==
=== Film ===
- Kabadayı (Barmaid) 2007
- Pek Yakında (Tuna Kaplan) (2014)
- Fakat Müzeyyen Bu Derin Bir Tutku (Pınar) (2014)
- Bir Varmış Bir Yokmuş (2015)
- Aşkın Gören Gözlere İhtiyacı Yok (2017)

=== Television ===
- Ayrılsak da Beraberiz (1999–2001)
- Ödünç Hayat (Maria) (2005)
- Kız Babası (Ayşe Maria) (2006)
- Senden Başka (Oya) (2007)
- Elveda Rumeli (Emine) (2009)
- Canımın İçi (Deniz) (2012)
- Medcezir (Leyla) (2013–2015)
- Poyraz Karayel (Meltem Karayel) (2015–2017)
- Beş Kardeş (Yeşim Yahşi) (2015)
- Vatanım Sensin (Latife Hanım) (2018)
- Çukur (Damla) (2019–2021)
