= İlker Kaleli =

Turkish actor (born 1984)

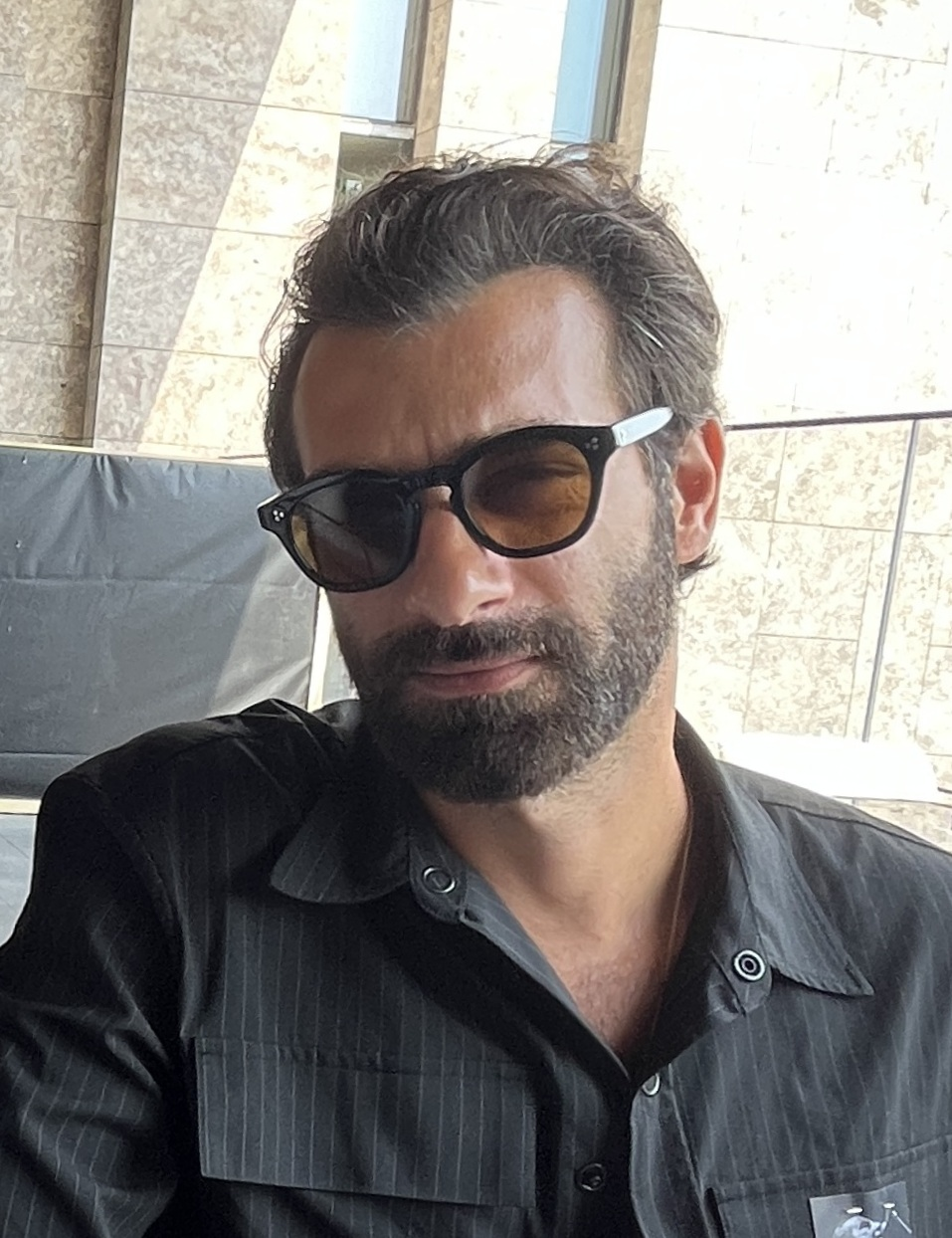
- Born: 11 May 1984 (age 42); Istanbul, Turkey
- Education: London Academy of Music and Dramatic Art
- Occupation: Actor
- Years active: 2012–present

İlker Kaan Kaleli (born 11 May 1984) is a Turkish actor best known for his role in Poyraz Karayel.

== Life and career ==
His maternal grandmother is German and his maternal grandfather is a Turkish scientist who graduated from Heidelberg University. His father is from Van province of Turkey. Kaleli graduated from Istanbul Kültür University, Department of Art Management. He studied acting in the London Academy of Music and Dramatic Art (LAMDA) acting school. He has also received acting lessons in the studio collectors of Şahika Tekand.

He has starred in many popular series, such as Son, Kayıp Şehir and Kayıp respectively. In 2014, he appeared in the film Silsile. From 2015 to 2017, Kaleli played the leading character in Poyraz Karayel, for which he received a Golden Butterfly Award as best actor in 2016.

== Filmography ==
=== Film ===
Year	Title	Role	Notes
2014	Silsile	Cenk	Main role

=== Web series ===
Year	Title	Role	Note
2018	Dip	Sahir Kaan	Main role
2021	The Serpent	Vitali Hakim	Supporting role
2024	La pasión turca		Main role

=== TV series ===
Year	Title	Role	Note
2007	Kelebek Çıkmazı	Tuncay	Guest
2012	Son	Alper	Supporting role
2012–2013	Kayıp Şehir	Irfan	Main role
2013	Kayıp	Faik Şaşmaz	Main role
2015–2017	Poyraz Karayel	Ahmet Poyraz Karayel	Main role
2020	Öğretmen	Akif Erdem	Main role
2023–	Arak	Akay Talan / Kara	Main role

== Awards and nominations ==
Year	Award	Category	Work	Result
2015	5. Turkey Elle Style Awards	Elle Style Actor of the Year	Kayıp	Nominated
2015	YBTB Top Awards of the Year	Most Successful TV Series Actor	Poyraz Karayel	Won
2015	4. Crystal Mouse Media Awards	Best Actor	Poyraz Karayel	Nominated
2015	42. Pantene Golden Butterfly Awards	Best Actor	Poyraz Karayel	Nominated
2015	Haliç University 2015's Top Awards	Best TV Actor of the Year	Poyraz Karayel	Won
2016	23. İTÜ EMÖS Achievement Awards	Most Successful TV Actor of the Year	Poyraz Karayel	Nominated
2016	2. Turkey Youth Awards	Best TV Actor	Poyraz Karayel	Nominated
2016	Ege University 5. Media Awards	Best TV Actor	Poyraz Karayel	Nominated
2016	1. YBU Media Awards	Best TV Actor	Poyraz Karayel	Nominated
2016	Gazi University 9. Academy Career Days Awards	Best Actor of the Year	Poyraz Karayel	Won
2016	6. Ayaklı Newspaper TV Stars Awards	Best Detective TV Series Actor	Poyraz Karayel	Won
2016	43. Pantene Golden Butterfly Awards	Best Actor	Poyraz Karayel	Won
2016	43. Pantene Golden Butterfly Awards	Best TV Couple (Ayşegül & Poyraz)	Poyraz Karayel	Nominated
2016	7. İMK Social Media Awards	Best Actor	Poyraz Karayel	Won
2017	15. YTÜ Stars of the Year Awards	Most Liked Series-Movie Actor	Poyraz Karayel	Won
2017	5. Bilkent TV Awards	Best Drama Actor	Poyraz Karayel	Nominated
2017	5. Bilkent TV Awards	Best Partner Compliance (Poyraz & Mümtaz Poyraz)	Poyraz Karayel	Nominated
2017	24. İTÜ EMÖS Achievement Awards	Most Successful TV Actor of the Year	Poyraz Karayel	Won
2017	8. KTÜ Media Awards	Most Liked Actor	Poyraz Karayel	Nominated
2017	8. KTÜ Media Awards	Most Liked TV Couple (Ayşegül & Poyraz)	Poyraz Karayel	Nominated
2017	11. GSUEN Awards	Best TV/Cinema Actor	Poyraz Karayel	Nominated
2017	Poyraz Karayel Special Awards	Series Contribution Special Award	Poyraz Karayel	Won

== TV survey achievements and nominations ==
Year	Award	Category	Work	Result
2016	Gecce.com Year-End TV Survey Awards	Best Actor of 2015	Poyraz Karayel	Nominated
2016	Gecce.com Year-End TV Survey Awards	Best TV Couple of 2015 (Ayşegül & Poyraz)	Poyraz Karayel	Won
2016	Noluyo.tv Year-End Surveys	Best Actor of 2015	Poyraz Karayel	Nominated
2016	Noluyo.tv Year-End Surveys	Best TV Couple of 2015 (Ayşegül & Poyraz)	Poyraz Karayel	Nominated
2017	Gecce.com Year-End TV Survey Awards	Best Actor of 2016	Poyraz Karayel	Nominated
2017	Gecce.com Year-End TV Survey Awards	Best TV Couple of 2016 (Ayşegül & Poyraz)	Poyraz Karayel	Nominated
2017	Noluyo.tv Year-End Surveys	Best Actor of 2016	Poyraz Karayel	Nominated
2017	Noluyo.tv Year-End Surveys	Best TV Couple of 2016 (Ayşegül & Poyraz)	Poyraz Karayel	Nominated
2017	Valentine's Day's Symbol Couple Survey Awards	Symbolic Couple of the Year (Burçin & İlker)	Poyraz Karayel	Won
2017	Poltio.com TV Survey Awards	Most Liked Couple (Burçin & İlker)	Poyraz Karayel	Won
