= Graham Farrow =

English playwright and screenwriter

Graham Ronald Farrow is an English playwright and screenwriter from North Yorkshire. He was born in Middlesbrough and educated at Scarborough College. He now lives in Yarm. His first novel, Speak no Evil, was nominated for the 1989 Commonwealth Writer's Prize.

His stageplays Talk about the Passion and Rattlesnakes have been produced globally; they are especially popular in the United States and London, but regularly play in different countries throughout the world and are translated into many different languages. Talk about the Passion and Rattlesnakes are published by Methuen of London. When Talk about the Passion ran in London in February 2018, The Stage Newspaper called the production one of the 'picks of the week'. Talk about the Passion had its Asian premiere in Istanbul in November 2018, directed by Turkish actor/musician Emre Kinay.

Other plays produced include Lake of Fire, Pure Morning, Hair of the Dog and Down Amongst the Dead Men. Farrow's plays typically deal with losers, loners, the down and out and the dispossessed; all searching for redemption or resolution of some sort.

His play Stay with me till Dawn, a modern-day morality tale, was produced by Second Skin Theatre company in January 2010.

His latest play was produced by Ixion Theatre Ensemble of Lansing, Michigan, in 2017.

A short film based on his short story 'Caught in the Gin Trap' was filmed in Paris by Balade Sauvage Productions in January 2021 . His stage play Every Breath you Take, which premiered in Lansing, was produced as a feature film in 2020 by AEON entertainment, Paris.

The play Rattlesnakes has been produced as a feature film starring Jack Coleman and Jimmy Jean Louis, directed by Julius Amedume and produced by Kew Media/JET Productions/Scala Films. Its world premier was at the Pan African Film Festival in Los Angeles in February 2019, where it received the audience award for best movie.
