= Nazlı (singer) =

Turkish singer, TV presenter and columnist

- Born: Nazlı Mengi; 20 February 1988 (age 38); Manchester, England
- Genre: Pop
- Occupations: Singer; TV presenter; columnist
- Years active: 2009–present
- Labels: Avrupa Müzik; DMC; Ossi Müzik; Star Odası Production; Yazz Records

Nazlı Mengi (born 20 February 1988) is a Turkish singer, TV presenter and columnist.

Before she began working as a columnist in Milliyet Cadde, she was worked in the radio and television sectors as an editor and presenter. In 2009, she began her music career with releasing her first studio album Beni Yazın. Since then she has released a number of singles, including Devamında "Rest" (2011), "Saygı Duruşu" (2011), "Can Bedenden Çıkmayınca" (2013), "Aradın mı?" (2014), "Aşk Bile" (2015), "Açık Ara" (2016) and "Hay Şansıma" (2017).

== Early life ==
Nazlı Mengi was born on 20 February 1988 in Manchester as the daughter of Ruhat Mengi and Ahmet Biliktan. She finished her middle and high school education at Saint Michel Fransız High School in Istanbul. She later graduated with a degree in finance studies from Istanbul Bilgi University.

== Career ==
=== Radio, television and journalism ===
She started her career as a DJ in Kiss FM. She later worked as an editor and then presenter on the politics program Her Açıdan, which aired on Star TV and later on Halk TV. After that, she worked as a sports speaker and editor on Kral TV and Spor D, and also worked as a presenter at various organizations. In 2009, she began working for Milliyet Cadde as a columnist.

=== Music career ===
On 15 June 2009, her first studio album Beni Yazın, was released by Avrupa Müzik. Separate music videos were made of the songs "Beni Yazın", "Kimi Seviyo", "Beni Sevme" and "Görmelisin". In 2010, she was featured on Volga Tamöz's single "Forget" and appeared on its music video. On 24 March 2011, her new single "Rest", which was written and composed by Volga Tamöz, was released by Avrupa Müzik. On 13 June 2011, she was chosen as one of the best newcomers at the 38th Golden Butterfly Awards, together with Nil Özalp, Can Bonomo and Berkay.

On 17 May 2012, Yazz Records released her new single "Saygı Duruşu". It was written by Güven Baran, and composed by Emrah Karaduman. On 17 May 2013, Yazz Records released her cover version of "Can Bedenden Çıkmayınca", which was originally written by Barış Manço for his 1989 album Darısı Başınıza; it was recomposed by Erdem Kınay. On 14 May 2014, her new song "Aradın mı?" was released by Ossi Müzik for which she collaborated with DJ Cemre Burak. The song was originally written by Serdar Ortaç for Hülya Avşar's 1998 studio album Hayat Böyle. Her single "Aşk Bile" was released on 10 June 2015 by Star Odası. It was written by Serdar Ortaça and composed by Erdem Kınay. On 25 July 2016, DMC released her new single "Açık Ara", which was written by Ayşen and composed by Kemal Şimşekyay. Another single, "Hay Şansıma", was released by DMC on 8 September 2017. It was written by Sinan Akçıl and arranged by Okan Akı.

== Discography ==
Studio albums

- Beni Yazın (2009, Avrupa Müzik)

Singles

- "Rest" (2011, Avrupa Müzik)
- "Saygı Duruşu" (2011, Yazz Records)
- "Can Bedenden Çıkmayınca" (2013, Yazz Records)
- "Aradın mı?" (2014, ft. Cemre Burak, Ossi Müzik)
- "Aşk Bile" (2015, Star Odası Production)
- "Açık Ara" (2016, DMC)
- "Hay Şansıma" (2017, DMC)

Singles that she contributed to

- "Forget" (2010, with Volga Tamöz)
