= Selva Erdener =

Turkish operatic soprano singer

Selva Erdener at the 76th Berlin International Film Festival

Selva Erdener is Turkish operatic soprano singer with the Turkish State Opera and Ballet. She studied at the Gazi University and attended conservatory at Hacettepe University in her hometown of Ankara. As a soloist with the Turkish State Opera she has performed in various works including Gluck's Orfeo ed Euridice, Puccini's La Boheme, Faust by Charles Gounod, Donizetti's Don Pasquale, I Pagliacci by Ruggero Leoncavallo, several Mozart operas (including Die Zauberflöte, Don Giovanni, Le nozze di Figaro, Cosi fan tutte).

Erdener performed the soprano vocals in "İnsan İnsan", a centuries old poem by the Alevi poet Muhyiddin Abdal that was set to music by the Turkish composer Fazıl Say.

== Albums ==
- 2000 - Sen Sen Sen (Kalan Müzik)
- 2011 - Düşlerimin Toprağı (Kalan Müzik)
- 2013 - Nereye Aşkım (Kalan Müzik)
- 2018 - Biliyor musun (Ada Music)
