= Surel, Ashok Nagar =

Surel
- Country: India
- State: Madhya Pradesh
- District: Anuppur

Languages
- Time zone: UTC+5:30 (IST)

Surel is a panchayat village in Chanderi Tehsil of Ashok Nagar District in the central Indian state of Madhya Pradesh. The panchayat also has the villages of Sunpura and Neem Kheda. Its coordinates are 24.689142°N, 77.933372°E.

== Demographics ==
Most people in the village belong to a scheduled tribe. This village is near the rock shelters at Aamkho.
