= Fazıl Say =

Turkish pianist and composer

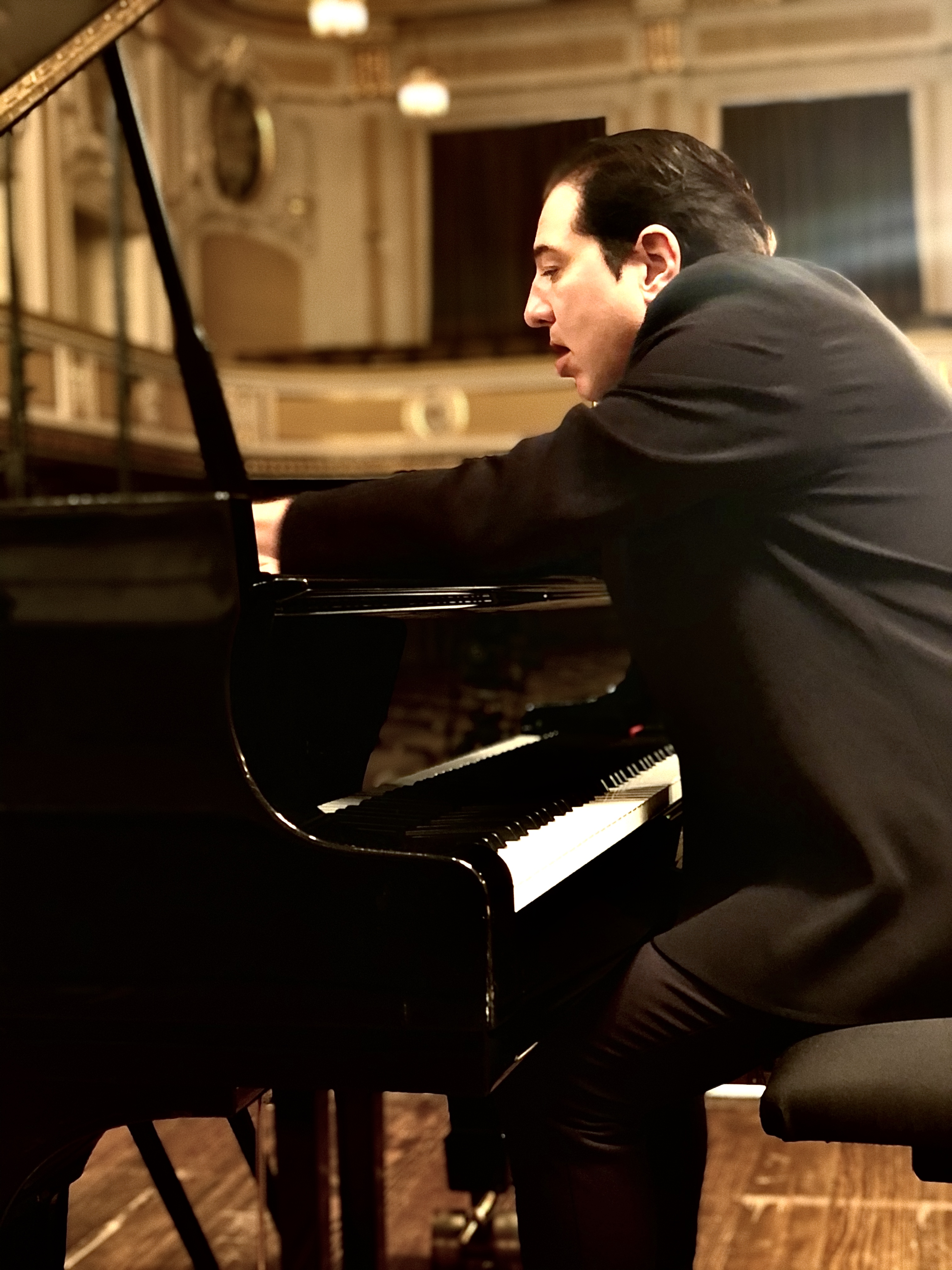
- Say recording at the Mozarteum concert hall in 2019
- Born: 14 January 1970 (age 56); Ankara, Turkey
- Occupations: Composer; pianist
- Years active: 1984–present
- Spouse(s): Gülyar Balcı (m. 1997; div. 2004) Ece Dağıstan (m. 2019; div. 2022) Aslıhan And (m. 2025)
- Website: fazilsay.com

Fazıl Say (Turkish: [faːˈzɯɫ saj]; born 14 January 1970) is a Turkish classical concert pianist and composer. He is known to often play his own compositions in his concerts, on top of a repertoire that includes Beethoven, Chopin, Bach and Mozart (with Say's own cadenzas).

== Life and career ==
Say was born in Ankara in 1970. His father, Ahmet Say, was an author and musicologist. His mother, Gürgün Say, was a pharmacist. His grandfather Fazıl Say, whose name he shares, was a member of the Spartakusbund. Say was a child prodigy, who was able to do basic arithmetic with 4-digit numbers at the age of two. His father, having found out that he was playing the melody of "Daha Dün Annemizin" (Turkish version of Ah! vous dirai-je, maman) on a makeshift flute with no prior training, enlisted the help of Ali Kemal Kaya, an oboist and family friend. At the age of three, Say started his piano lessons under the tutelage of pianist Mithat Fenmen.

Say wrote his first piece, a piano sonata, in 1984, at the age of fourteen, when he was a student at the Ankara State Conservatory. It was followed, in this early phase of his development, by several chamber works without an opus number, including Schwarze Hymnen for violin and piano and a guitar concerto. He subsequently designated as his opus 1 one of the works that he had played in the concert that won him the Young Concert Artists Auditions in New York: Four Dances of Nasreddin Hodja (1990). This work already displays in essence the significant features of his personal style: a rhapsodic, fantasia-like basic structure; a variable rhythm, often dance-like, though formed through syncopation; a continuous, vital driving pulse; and a wealth of melodic ideas often based on themes from the folk music of Turkey and its neighbours. He drew from local traditional tradition like Béla Bartók, George Enescu and György Ligeti. He attracted international attention with the piano piece Black Earth, Op. 8 (1997), in which he employs techniques made popular by John Cage's works for prepared piano.

Say increasingly turned to the large orchestral forms. Taking his inspiration from the poetry (and the biographies) of the writers Nâzım Hikmet and Metin Altıok, he composed works for soloists, chorus and orchestra which, especially in the case of the oratorio Nâzim, Op. 9 (2001), take up the tradition of composers such as Carl Orff. Say also made frequent use in these works of traditional instruments from Turkey, including kudüm and darbuka drums and the ney reed flute. In 2007 his 1001 Nights in the Harem violin concerto was premiered by Patricia Kopatchinskaja and received further performances in international concert halls.

His first symphony, the Istanbul Symphony was premiered in 2010 at the conclusion of his five-year residency at the Konzerthaus Dortmund. Jointly commissioned by the WDR and the Konzerthaus in the framework of Ruhr in 2010, the work is a vibrant and poetic tribute to the city and its inhabitants. The same year saw the composition of his Divorce String Quartet, based on atonal principles, and commissioned works such as the Nirvana Burning piano concerto for the Salzburg Festival and a trumpet concerto for the Mecklenburg-Vorpommern Festival, premiered by Gábor Boldoczki.

Say wrote a clarinet concerto for Sabine Meyer in 2011 that refers to the life and work of the Persian poet Omar Khayyam in response to a commission from the 2011 Schleswig-Holstein Musik Festival, and also a clarinet sonata for the Kissinger Sommer of 2012. His works have been published by Schott.

In his three works Gezi Park from 2013/14 he reflected the suppression of the Gezi Park protests.

The lyrics for his song "Insan Insan" were taken from a centuries-old poem written by Alevi poet Muhyiddin Abdal. The track was orchestrated by Say with vocals from Selva Erdener (soprano), Burcu Uyar (coloratura soprano), Güvenç Dağüstün (baritone) and Cem Adrian (ethnic vocals).

Fazıl Say is also known for being a passionate supporter of Fenerbahçe Spor Kulübü.

In October 2023, Fazıl Say said that his planned performances with the City of Birmingham Symphony Orchestra in Switzerland were cancelled after he called for Israeli Prime Minister Benjamin Netanyahu to "stand trial for war crimes, genocide and massacres."

== Blasphemy charge ==
In April 2012, Say came under investigation by the Istanbul Prosecutor's Office over statements made on Twitter, after declaring himself an atheist and retweeting a famous poem of 11th century muslim polymath Omar Khayyam which criticises twisted conception of paradise of some fundamentalist schools and movements. Say then announced that he was considering leaving Turkey to live in Japan because of the rise of conservative Islam and growing intolerance in his home country.

On 1 June 2012, an Istanbul court indicted Say with the crime of "publicly insulting religious values that are adopted by a part of the nation", a crime that carries a penalty of up to 18 months in prison. According to Anatolia news agency, Say told the Istanbul court he did not seek to insult anybody, but was merely expressing his uneasiness. The court adjourned the case to 18 February after rejecting his lawyers’ request for an immediate acquittal. “When I read them (Say tweets), I was heart-broken, I felt disgraced.” Turan Gümüş, one of the three plaintiffs, told the court. On 15 April 2013, Say was sentenced to 10 months in jail, reduced from 12 months for good behavior in court. The sentence was suspended, meaning he was allowed to move freely provided he did not repeat the offense in the next five years.

On appeal, Turkey's Supreme Court of Appeals reversed the conviction on 26 October 2015, ruling that Say's Twitter posts fell within the bounds of freedom of thought and freedom of expression.

Although he declared himself an atheist, in 2018, after photos of him praying at his mother's funeral surfaced, he denied those who called him an atheist, saying, "Later we heard that those who accused me of disbelief turned out to be women traders and were imprisoned."

== Honors and awards ==
- Winner of the Young Concert Artists International Auditions (1994)
- Paul A. Fish Foundation Awards (1995)
- Le Monde Awards (2000)
- Echo Klassik (2001)
- German Music Critics’ Best Recording of the Year Award (2001)
- Ambassador of Intercultural Dialogue (2008)
- "Echo" German Record Award (2009)
- "ECHO Klassik 2013 Special Jury Award with Istanbul Symphony Album
- Prix International de la Laïcité 2015 (Comité Laïcité République, France)
- Beethoven Prize 2016 (Beethoven Academy)
- Duisburger Musikpreis (2017)

== Artist / Composer in residence ==
- Staatskapelle Weimar, 2022/23
- Alte Oper Frankfurt, 2015/2016
- Laeiszhalle Hamburg, 2014/2015
- Bodenseefestival, 2014
- Wiener Konzerthaus, 2013/2014
- Hessischer Rundfunk Frankfurt, 2012/2013
- Konzerthaus Berlin, 2010/2011
- Schleswig-Holstein Musik Festival 2011
- Merano Festival, 2010
- Elbphilharmonie Hamburg, 2010
- Théâtre des Champs-Élysées, Paris 2010
- Festspiele Mecklenburg-Vorpommern 2010
- Sumida Triphony Hall, Tokyo 2008
- Konzerthaus Dortmund, 2005–2010
- Musikfest Bremen 2005
- Radio France 2003 & 2005

== Recordings ==
1. 1993 CD / (SFB) (Scarlatti–Berg–Say)
2. 1996 CD / Troppenote Records (Say)
3. 1998 CD / Warner Music (Mozart Sonatas)
4. 1999 CD / Teldec (Bach)
5. 2000 CD / Teldec (Gershwin)
6. 2000 CD / Teldec (Stravinski–Le sacre)
7. 2001 CD / Teldec (Liszt–Tchaikovski)
8. 2002 CD / İmaj (Nazım)
9. 2003 CD / Naive (Say/Black Earth)
10. 2003 CD / İmaj (Metin Altıok ağıtı)
11. 2003 CD / Bilkent (Nazım)
12. 2004 CD / Naive (Mozart Concertos)
13. 2005 CD / Naive (Beethoven Sonatas for Piano)
14. 2006 CD / Naive (Haydn Sonatas)
15. 2006 CD / Avex (Live in Tokyo)
16. 2007 CD / Naive (Kopatchinskaja–Say / Beethoven / Bartok / Ravel)
17. 2008 CD / Naive (Kopatchinskaja–Say 1001 Nights in the Harem)
18. 2011 Fazil Say: Pictures (CD / DVD)
19. 2012 Istanbul Symphony & Hezarfen Ney Concerto (CD / DVD)
20. 2019 CD / Warner Bros. (Fazil Say plays Say: Troy Sonata, Yürüyen Köşk, two pieces from Art of Piano)
21. 2019 CD / Winter & Winter (Ferhan & Ferzan Önder play Fazil Say: Winter Morning in Istanbul, Gezi Park – Concerto for two pianos & orchestra, Sonata for two pianos)
22. 2019 CD / Sony (1001 Nights in the Harem: Violin Concerto, Grand Bazaar, China Rhapsody)
23. 2022 CD / Warner Classics (Goldberg Variations BWV988)
24. 2023 CD / Alpha Classics (Kopatchinskaja–Say / Janácek / Brahms / Bartók)
25. 2024 CD / Warner Classics / Oiseaux tristes (Couperin * Debussy * Ravel)

== Chronological list of compositions ==
Chronological list of Fazıl Say's compositions
Opus	Composition	Form	Year	City
	Phrigian for Piano	Early Works	1984	Ankara
	Sonata for Piano	Early Works	1984	Ankara
	Ballade for Cello and Piano	Early Works	1985	Ankara
	Preludes for Piano	Early Works	1985	Ankara
	Preludes for Flute and Piano	Early Works	1985	Ankara
	Guitar Concerto	Early Works	1986	Ankara
	Suite for Piano	Early Works	1986	Ankara
	Schwarze Hymnen for Violin and Piano	Early Works	1987	Ankara
	4 Stücke for Piano	Early Works	1987	Düsseldorf
	Paganini Jazz 1. Version for Piano	Piano	1988	Düsseldorf
	Seidenstrasse for Piano solo	Early Works	1989	Düsseldorf
	Debussy Preludes Orchestration	Early Works	1990	Düsseldorf
1	Nasreddin Hoca’nın dansları for Piano	Early Works	1990	Düsseldorf
	Reflections for Piano Violin and Orchestra	Early Works	1990	Düsseldorf
	Paganini Jazz 2. Version for Piano	Piano	1990	Düsseldorf
	3 Maerchen for Piano and Chamber Orchestra	Orchestral	1991	Düsseldorf
	Alt Anatolisches Tagebuch for Piano	Early Works	1991	Düsseldorf
	Melodien for Piano	Early Works	1992	Berlin
	Liszt Sonata Orchestration	Orchestration	1992	Berlin
3	Symphonia Concertante for Piano and Orchestra	Orchestral	1993	Berlin
5a	AllaTurca Jazz ( Mozart )	Piano	1993	Berlin
2	Fantasiestücke for Piano	Piano	1993	Berlin
4	Silk Road for Piano and Chamber Orchestra	Chamber	1994	Berlin
5b	Paganini Jazz 3. Version	Piano	1995	Berlin
5c	Cadenza Mozart K 467	Orchestral	1995	Berlin
5d	25 Songs	Song	1995	Berlin
5e	Concerto for Guitar in d	Concerto	1996	New York
6	Chamber Symphony	Chamber	1997	New York
8	Black Earth for Piano	Piano	1997	New York
7	Sonata for Violin and Piano	Chamber	1997	New York
5f	Yeni bir Gülnihal Jazz Variations for Piano	Piano	1997	New York
	Sonata for Piano Silence of Southeast	Piano	1998	New York
	Gershwin arrangements for sixtett	Piano	1999	New York
	UÇAK NOTLARI	Book	1999	New York
	Pieces for world jazz quartett	Chamber	2000	New York
11	Silence of Anatolia Piano Concerto	Concerto	2001	New York
10	Cadenza Beethoven No 3	Piano	2001	New York
9	Nazım Oratorio	Oratorio	2001	New York
12	3 Ballades for Piano	Piano	2002	Istanbul
13	Metin Altıok Ağıtı	Oratorio	2003	Istanbul
14	Rhapsodia Uzun ince Yoldayım	Chamber	2004	Istanbul
15	Cadenza Mozart KV 537	Piano	2004	Istanbul
16	Thinking Einstein for Piano and Orchestra	Concerto	2005	Istanbul
17	Patara Ballet for Ney–Flute, Soprano, Percussions and Piano	Dance	2005	Istanbul
18	Ultimathule Film Music	Cinema	2005	Istanbul
	DVD / İmaj ( Nazım Oratorio )	Recording	2002	Istanbul
19	Bach-Say Passacaglia ( Transcription)	Piano	2005	Istanbul
20	Summertime Phantasy Gershwin	Piano	2005	Istanbul
21	Pianist the Wolfy	Cinema	2006	Istanbul
22	İnsan insan	Cinema	2006	Istanbul
23	Fenerbahçe Project	Orchestral	2007	Istanbul
24	Bach-Say Fantasia in g ( Transcription )	Piano	2007	Istanbul
25	1001 Nights in the Harem Violin Concerto	Concerto	2007	Istanbul
	Yalnızlık kederi	Book	2009	Istanbul
26	Princess of Lykia for 2 Guitars	Chamber	2009	Istanbul
27	Watercolor	Cinema	2009	Istanbul
28	Istanbul Symphony	Orchestral	2009	Istanbul
	İmaj ( Fenerbahçe Project )	DVD	2010	Istanbul
29	String Quartett	Chamber	2010	Istanbul
30	Nirvana Burning	Concerto	2010	Istanbul
31	Concerto for Trompet	Concerto	2010	Istanbul
32	Variations for 2 Pianos and Percussion	Chamber	2010	Istanbul
33	7000 yıllık uçan halı ( 7,000 Year Old Flying Carpet )	Theatre	2010	Istanbul
34	Cleopatra for solo Violin	Chamber	2010	Istanbul
35	Woodwinds Quintett “Alevi dedeler rakı masasında” (Alevi Fathers at the Raki Table)	Chamber	2010	Istanbul
	Nazım Oratorio 2010 Version	Reduction	2010	Istanbul
	Yeni bir Gülnihal – Jazz Variations	Reduction	2010	Istanbul
	Nirvana Burning	Piano Excerpt	2010	Istanbul
	Trompeten Konzert	Piano Excerpt	2010	Istanbul
36	Concerto for Clarinet “Khayyam”	Concerto	2011	Istanbul
	Fazıl Say: Pianist – Komponist – Weltbürger by Jürgen Otten	Book	2011	Istanbul
37	“4 Lieder” – “4 Songs”	Songs	2011	Istanbul
38	Symphony No. 2 “Mezopotamya” (Mesopotamia) for large orchestra	Orchestral	2011	Istanbul
39	Hezarfen Concerto for Ney and Orchestra	Concerto	2011	Istanbul
40	SES	Song	2012	Istanbul
41	Sonata for Cello and Piano – “4 Cities” ( Dört Şehir )	Chamber	2012	Istanbul
42	Sonata for Clarinet and Piano	Chamber	2012	Istanbul
43	Symphony No. 3 “Universe”	Orchestral	2012	Istanbul
44	6 Songs	Song	2012	Istanbul
45	“Water” for Piano and Orchestra	Concerto	2012	Istanbul
46	Space Jump for Trio (Piano, Violin, Cello)	Chamber	2013	Istanbul
55	Suite for Alto Saxophone & Piano	Chamber	2014	Istanbul
	Concerto for Percussion and Orchestra	Concerto	2018	

== Other works ==
=== Books ===
- Uçak Notları (Airplane Notes) Ankara (1999)
- Metin Altıok Ağıtı (Requiem for Metin Altıok) (2003)
- Yalnızlık Kederi (Sorrow of Solitude) (2009)
- "Fazıl Say: Pianist – Komponist – Weltbürger" by Jürgen Otten (2011)

=== Videography ===
- Fazıl Say – Alla Turca (DVD, 2008)
- Fazıl Say – Live in Japan (DVD)
- Fazıl Say – Nazım (DVD, 2001)
- Fazıl Say – Fenerbahçe Senfonisi (DVD)
- Fazıl Say – Istanbul Symphony Concert (DVD, 2012)
- Fazıl Say – Istanbul Symphony Short Documentary (DVD, 2012)

== See also ==
- Bilkent University
- Bilkent Symphony Orchestra
- Borusan Istanbul Philharmonic Orchestra
- Konzerthaus Dortmund

== Other sources ==
- Fazıl Say Biography (in English)
- Fazıl Say biography, Istanbul University (in Turkish)
