= Azra Kohen =

Turkish writer

- Born: Özge Sarı; July 1977 (age 49); İzmir, Turkey
- Other name: Azra Sarızeybek
- Occupation: Author
- Known for: Fi, Aeden, Gör Beni
- Spouse: Sadok Kohen (m. 2001)
- Children: 1

Azra "Akilah" Kohen (born 1979) is a Turkish writer. After releasing her first novel, Fi, under the name Akilah, she started to release her subsequent novels, Çi and Pi under the name Azra Kohen. She later published novels Aeden in 2017 and Gör Beni in 2019.

== Early life and career ==
Azra Kohen was born as "Azra Sarızeybek" in 1979 in İzmir. She graduated from the Faculty of Communication, Radio, Television and Cinema, at Istanbul University. Azra Kohen later studied Economics at Ottawa University in Canada. She said that her main motivation for educating herself was to "learn more about this world". She speaks English and Italian.

Her trilogy narrative series Fi, Çi and Pi were translated to Italian. The series also became popular in the form of an Internet series called Fi, and Kohen expressed her intention to author a book about what happened to her during the production process of Fi. Kohen stated in 2017 that she was working on two other books, Nakar and Dinle Beni.

== Personal life ==
She married Sadok Kohen in 2001 and the couple's son was born in 2009. In 2024 she publicly stated she believed certain Palestinians were responsible for the deaths of their own children in the Gaza Strip. After this statement, publishers denounced her claims and dropped her books.

== Controversies ==
In June 2018, Kohen became involved in a public dispute with her former publisher, Destek Yayın Grubu, concerning royalty payments. Destek Yayın Grubu publicly rejected her claims, stating that substantial royalty payments had been made and that the disputed amount reported in the press represented only a small portion of the total payments. In the same statement, the publisher also referred to related legal disputes concerning the television adaptation of Fi, including claims involving editor and screenwriter Haluk Bener, Ay Yapım, and a separate plagiarism allegation made by another writer.

In April 2020, Kohen’s use of the title “psychologist” became the subject of public criticism after she appeared on Habertürk during the COVID-19 pandemic and was introduced in connection with that title. Critics questioned whether she had the academic and professional qualifications required to use it.

Kohen initially responded by sharing documents related to her education. However, critics argued that the documents did not establish her eligibility to use the title. She later stated that she was not a clinical psychologist and said that she had studied applied psychology.

In a profile published on 1 June 2024, Serbestiyet discussed the controversy surrounding Kohen’s educational background and use of the title “psychologist”. The article stated that Kohen had shown a bachelor’s diploma during a video interview, and examined questions concerning the name and education details associated with the document by comparing them with publicly available university graduate-list information.

On 30 May 2024, Kohen drew public criticism after responding to a social media user who had questioned her silence regarding Palestine and Rafah. In her response, Kohen made remarks about Palestinian parents and children in Gaza, including claims that children were being taken to bombed areas in order to be filmed. The comments were widely criticized on social media, with many users accusing her of blaming Palestinians and making statements that dehumanized civilians.

Following the backlash, Cumhuriyet reported that Everest Yayınları removed Kohen from its author list and withdrew her books from its website. In a public statement, the publisher condemned the genocide against Palestinians and stated that individuals who legitimize or praise such acts could not remain within the publishing group.

Around 30–31 May 2024, several online book retailers and platforms were reported to have removed Kohen’s books from sale or from their listings, including Kitapyurdu, D&R, İdefix and BKM Kitap. Serbestiyet also reported that boycott calls followed the remarks, and that Kohen later defended herself in a video, saying that her comments had been taken out of context and that she had been referring to the exploitation of children in online videos.

On 31 May 2024, Everest Yayınları announced that it had ended its publishing relationship with Kohen.

== Awards ==
- Elele Avon Author of the Year Award (2018)

== Works ==
- Fi
- Çi
- Pi
- Aeden
- Gör Beni
