= Leaky gut syndrome =

Hypothetical medical condition

Leaky gut syndrome is a hypothetical and medically unrecognized condition that is distinct from the scientific phenomenon of increased intestinal permeability commonly known as "leaky gut". Claims for the existence of "leaky gut syndrome" as a distinct medical condition come mostly from nutritionists and practitioners of alternative medicine. Proponents claim that a "leaky gut" causes chronic inflammation throughout the body that results in a wide range of conditions, including myalgic encephalomyelitis/chronic fatigue syndrome, rheumatoid arthritis, lupus, migraines, multiple sclerosis, and autism. There is little evidence to support this hypothesis.

Stephen Barrett has described "leaky gut syndrome" as a fad diagnosis and says that its proponents use the alleged condition as an opportunity to sell a number of alternative-health remedies – including diets, herbal preparations, and dietary supplements. Promoters of pseudoscience have claimed that the passage of proteins through a "leaky" gut is the cause of autism. Evidence for claims that a leaky gut causes autism is weak and conflicting.

Advocates tout various treatments for "leaky gut syndrome", such as dietary supplements, probiotics, herbal remedies, gluten-free foods, and low-FODMAP, low-sugar, and/or antifungal diets, but there is little evidence that the treatments offered are of benefit. None have been adequately tested to determine whether they are safe and effective for this purpose. The UK National Institute for Health and Care Excellence (NICE) does not recommend the use of any special diets to manage the main symptoms of autism or leaky gut syndrome.

== See also ==
- List of topics characterized as pseudoscience
