= Önder Çakar =

Önder Çakar is a screenwriter, producer, and actor from Turkey.

== Studies ==
=== As a scriptwriter ===
- On Board (Gemide) (1998)
- A Madonna in Laleli (Laleli'de Bir Azize) (1998)
- Offside (Dar Alanda Kısa Paslaşmalar) (2001)
- Maruf (2002)
- Takva: A Man's Fear of God (Takva) (2006)

=== As a producer ===
- On Board (Gemide) (1998)
- A Madonna in Laleli (Laleli'de Bir Azize) (1998)
- Maruf (2002)
- Majority (Çoğunluk) (2010)

=== As a player ===
- Takva: A Man's Fear of God (Takva) (2005)
- Yolda / Rüzgar Geri Getirirse Ali Salim (2005)
- The Edge of Heaven (Yaşamın Kıyısında) Avukat (2007)

=== As an actor ===
- On the Way, Erden Kıral, (2005)

=== Awards ===
- Hopeful Young Actor (Yolda / Rüzgar Geri Getirirse) / 17. Ankara Uluslararası Film Festivali 2006.
- Best Screenplay (Takva: A Man's Fear of God) / 43rd Antalya Golden Orange Film Festival 2006.
- Best Screenplay (Offside (2000 film)) / 22. Sinema Yazarları Derneği Ödülleri 2000.
