= Erman Saban =

Erman Saban (born 1983, Skopje, Yugoslavia (today North Macedonia)) is a Macedonian actor of Turkish descent.

He graduated from the Acting Department of the Skopje Faculty of Dramatic Arts. He is acting at the Skopje Turkish Theatre with his older brother Ertan Saban. in 2005, when a team from Turkey visited the Turkish Theater to watch Turkish actors in Macedonia, he attracted the attention of observers with his performance and played the character of Muhittin in the film Taqva, starring Erkan Can and Güven Kıraç. He played Dilaver, the Prefect of Pürsıçan, in the TV series Elveda Rumeli, which was once the most beloved production.

Finally, he is mentioned in the announced cast of the new series called "Balkan Lullaby", which will be filmed in Macedonia by Trt.

== Films ==
2005	Takva	Muhittin
2007-2009	Elveda Rumeli	Kaymakam Dilaver
2009-2010	Balkan Dügünü	
2011	Muhteşem Yüzyıl	Alvise Gritti
2012	Son Yaz - Balkanlar 1912	
2014–2015	Hatasız Kul Olmaz	İmam İlyas
2015-2016	Büyük Sürgün Kafkasya	Mikail Gelashvili
2020	Acı Kiraz	Ljuljzim
2021	Juli	Metin
2022-2023	Balkan Ninnisi	Zafer
2023	Barbaros Hayreddin: Sultanın Fermanı	Pîrî Reis
