= Offside (2000 film) =

- Theatrical Poster
- Directed by: Serdar Akar
- Written by: Serdar Akar; Önder Çakar
- Produced by: Üstün Karabol; Nida Karabol Akdeniz
- Starring: Müjde Ar; Savaş Dinçel; Uğur Polat; Rafet El Roman; Şahnaz Çakıralp; Erkan Can; Fatih Akyol
- Cinematography: Mehmet Aksin
- Edited by: Hakan Akol
- Music by: Fahir Atakoğlu
- Release date: 8 December 2000
- Running time: 115 minutes
- Country: Turkey
- Language: Turkish

Offside (Turkish: Dar Alanda Kısa Paslaşmalar) is a 2000 Turkish comedy-drama film, written and directed by Serdar Akar, about a local amateur football player that hopes to win the league championship. The film, which went on nationwide general release across Turkey on 8 December 2000, won four awards at the 20th Istanbul International Film Festival, including Best Turkish Film of the Year and the People's Choice Award. It was described by author Rekin Teksoy as having a "less innovative albeit fluent style" in comparison to the director's debut film On Board (Turkish: Gemide, 1998).

== Plot ==
Thirtysomething Suat still lives with his parents and works at his father's store when not practising as goalie for the local football team, Esnaf Spor. Suat is in love with Nurten, the neighbourhood beauty, but she has never responded to his many secret letters. The neighbourhood's greatest wish is for Esnaf Spor to win the amateur league championship.

== Cast ==
- Müjde Ar as Aynur
- Savaş Dinçel as Hacı
- Uğur Polat as Cem
- Rafet El Roman as Serkan
- Şahnaz Çakıralp as Nurten
- Erkan Can as Suat
- Fatih Akyol as Selçuk
