= Elif Doğan =

Turkish actress (born 1994)

- Born: 6 September 1994 (age 31); Istanbul, Turkey
- Education: Istanbul University
- Occupation: Actress
- Years active: 2016–present

Elif Doğan (born 6 September 1994) is a Turkish actress.

== Life and career ==
A graduate of Istanbul University with a degree in musical studies, Doğan started her career with a role in the TV series Aşk Laftan Anlamaz and continued her career in television with Hayat Bazen Tatlıdır. She was then cast in a supporting role in Çukur and had her first leading role in the series Darısı Başımıza. She further rose to prominence with her role as Azra in the 2020 series Gençliğim Eyvah. In 2024, she portrayed Mila (based on Stephanie of Milly) in Kudüs Fatihi Selahaddin Eyyubi.

== Filmography ==
Television
Year	Title	Role	Notes
2016	Aşk Laftan Anlamaz	Suna Pektaş	Supporting role
2016–2017	Hayat Bazen Tatlıdır	Zeynep	Supporting role
2017–2018	Çukur	Hale Atık	Supporting role
2018	Darısı Başımıza	Öykü Tekin	Leading role
2019	Zengin ve Yoksul	Aleyna Erdemli	Leading role
2020	Gençliğim Eyvah	Azra Bozoğlu	Leading role
2021–2022	Destan	Tutkun	Supporting role
2023	Dilek Taşı	Sevda Rona	Supporting role
2024 - present	Kudüs Fatihi Selahaddin Eyyubi	Mila	Leading role

Web series
Year	Title	Role	Notes
2021	Aynen Aynen	Simge	Guest appearance

Film
Year	Title	Role	Notes
2016	Kayıp İnci		Supporting role
2017	Emoji Filmi		Voicing
2017	Şirinler 3: Kayıp Köy		Voicing
2017	Bezmi Ezel		Supporting role
2020	Aşk Tesadüfleri Sever 2	Die Junga Sema	Leading role

== Discography ==
- 2020: "Bir Rüya Gördüm" (with Nesrin Javadzadeh) - Love Likes Coincidences 2 soundtrack
