= Destiny (2006 film) =

2006 Turkish drama film

- Theatrical Poster
- Directed by: Zeki Demirkubuz
- Written by: Zeki Demirkubuz
- Produced by: Zeki Demirkubuz
- Starring: Vildan Atasever; Ufuk Bayraktar; Müge Ulusoy; Mustafa Uzunyılmaz; Ozan Bilen; Erkan Can; Engin Akyürek
- Cinematography: Zeki Demirkubuz
- Music by: Edward Artemiev
- Production company: Mavi Film
- Distributed by: Özen Film, Filmpot
- Release date: November 17, 2006
- Running time: 103 minutes
- Country: Turkey
- Language: Turkish

Destiny (Turkish: Kader) is a 2006 Turkish drama film, produced, written and directed by Zeki Demirkubuz, starring Vildan Atasever as a bar singer who is in love with a somewhat unstable criminal. The film, which went on nationwide general release across Turkey on November 17, 2006, won awards at film festivals in Antalya, Ankara, Nuremberg and Istanbul, including the Golden Orange for Best film. It is a prequel to Innocence (1997).

== Plot ==
Uğur (Vildan Atasever) is a bar singer who is in love with a somewhat unstable criminal, Zagor (Ozan Bilen). Her father is seriously ill and her young mother is emotionally distant. Cevat (Engin Akyürek) is a young man who had taken under his protection Uğur's family. Cevat is the beloved of Uğur's young mother. Uğur's younger brother is bullied at the coffee shop where he works. Cevat protects him and warns the people at the coffee shop not to bully him. The day comes when the boy is bullied again. Cevat goes to his aid and beats up Kamil. Zagor breaks the fight up and tells his men to take Kamil outside. Zagor and Cevat start arguing, then Cevat pulls out a gun and is ultimately killed by Zagor in his attempt to prove that he did not fear Zagor. Bekir (Ufuk Bayraktar) is a young man who runs his father's business. He becomes infatuated with Uğur after she visits his shop one day. After a series of violent incidents and mishaps occur in Istanbul, both Uğur and Zagor disappear. They resurface after shooting two policemen and getting caught in Izmir. After Zagor is landed in prison some time afterward, Uğur reappears and asks Bekir to help her. Meanwhile, Zagor is transferred to a prison in Sinop. Uğur tries to trace Zagor who has escaped from prison as Bekir tries to trace Uğur.

== Awards ==
Kader won several awards including the Golden Orange and Golden Tulip for best film and also for its acting and screenplay

Golden Orange awards

- Best film, Best actor (Ufuk Bayraktar)

Ankara film festival

- Best actress (Vildan Atasever), Best director (Zeki Demirkubuz), Best supporting actress (Müge Ulusoy)

Nuremberg film festival

- Best film (Jury), Audience award

Istanbul film festival

- Golden Tulip for best film, Best director (Zeki Demirkubuz), Best actor (Ufuk Bayraktar)

Contemporary Screen Actors Association (CASOD) awards

- Most Promising Actor (Engin Akyurek)

The Cinema Writers Association (SIYAD) Awards

- Most Promising Actor (Engin Akyurek)
