= Masumiyet =

Innocence (Masumiyet)
- Directed by: Zeki Demirkubuz
- Written by: Zeki Demirkubuz
- Produced by: Zeki Demirkubuz; Nihal Koldaş
- Starring: Derya Alabora; Haluk Bilginer; Güven Kıraç
- Cinematography: Ali Utku
- Edited by: Mevlüt Koçak
- Music by: Cengiz Onural
- Distributed by: Mavi Filmcilik, Filmpot
- Release date: 24 October 1997
- Running time: 110 minutes
- Country: Turkey
- Language: Turkish
- Box office: 26.189 TL

Masumiyet (Innocence) is a 1997 Turkish dramatic film directed by Zeki Demirkubuz and starring Derya Alabora, Haluk Bilginer and Güven Kıraç. It was followed by a prequel, the 2006 film Kader, which recounts the experiences of Uğur and Bekir in their youth and how they first met.

== Plot ==
After serving his ten-year sentence for killing the man (his best friend) with whom his married sister was having a secret affair and being released from prison, Yusuf travels to İzmir to stay at his sister and brother-in-law's home. However, driven away by his brother-in-law's antics and domestic violence, he leaves and checks into a dilapidated, cheap hotel in Basmane instead. Yusuf's path crosses with that of Uğur, Bekir and Uğur’s young daughter, Çilem, at this hotel.

One night, Çilem suddenly falls ill. Yusuf, who takes her to hospital, thus becomes part of lifes of Uğur, Bekir, and Çilem. As time goes by, he learns the story of Uğur and Bekir. Uğur is a sex worker who is in love with an unstable criminal, Zagor. Zagor is repeatedly transferred from prison to prison across different cities due to his offenses. Unable to detach herself away from him, Uğur is follows him from city to city.

Bekir, meanwhile, has left behind his family, his friends and his shop for the sake of his unrequited love for Uğur. For years he has been travelling from city to city in pursuit of Uğur; despite financial hardship and personal humiliation. The scene during the countryside outing where Bekir tells Yusuf his life story is one of the film's most memorable moments. Bekir explains what he has given up for Uğur’s sake and why, despite all the suffering he has endured, he still follows her. He is well aware that Uğur does not love him.

When Bekir takes his own life in a hotel room, it changes the lives of all three. After his death, Yusuf stays with Uğur and Çilem, looking after Çilem and accompanying Uğur on her trips to the nightclub and eventually confessing his love to her, who rejects him. Later, Zagor escapes from prison, and following a police pursuit, both Uğur and Zagor are reported killed in a shootout. Yusuf takes Çilem and returns to Istanbul. There, he visits the father of his former prison friend Orhan and learns that Orhan and Zagor are the same person. Looking at the shrouded body of his friend who lost his life in prison, Yusuf connects the events, bringing the narrative to a close.

The film ends with a quote from Samuel Beckett that sums up the characters' inescapable cycle: "Ever tried. Ever failed. No matter. Try again. Fail again. Fail better."

Although Zagor never appears on camera, his mere presence and Uğur's obsessive love for him dictate the course of the film.

== Cast ==
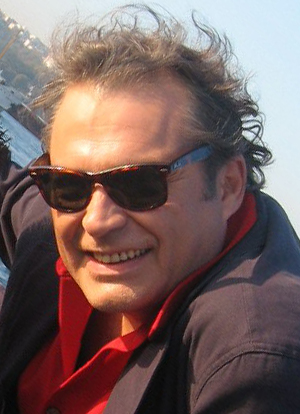
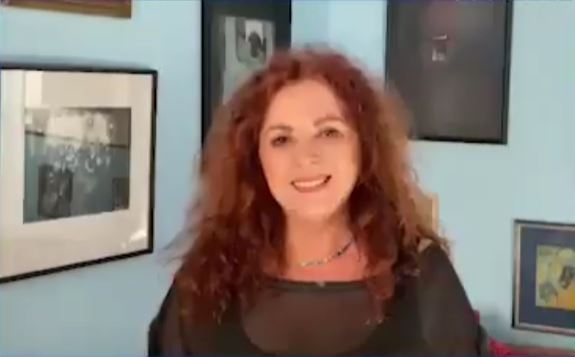
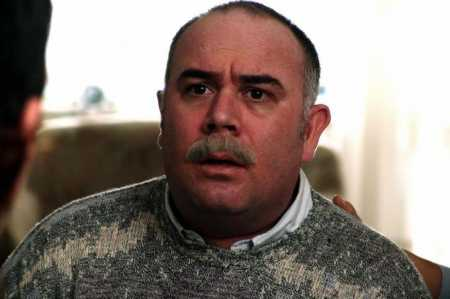
From left to right Haluk Bilginer, Derya Alabora, Güven Kıraç
- Derya Alabora as Uğur
- Haluk Bilginer as Bekir
- Güven Kıraç as Yusuf
- Melis Tuna as Çilem
- Doğan Turan as hotelier Mehmet
- Ajlan Aktuğ as Yusuf's brother-in-law
- Nihal Koldaş as Yusuf's sister
- Erdoğan Seren as the man in the nightclub
- Rıza Sönmez as the man in the cafe
- Ümit Çırak as Necati
- İskender Altın as the policeman on the bus
- Feridun Koç as the vendor
- Abdullah Demirkubuz as the policeman during the raid
- Yalçın Çakmak as the prison governor
- Nazım Gök as Yusuf's brother-in-law's son
- Salih Urfa as the bodyguard at the hotel
- Süha Tuna as the interrogating policeman
- Namık Eken as the policeman during the raid
- Eray Kantarcı as the man at the hotel
- Engin Kurtçuoğlu as Zagor's father
- Dursun Derebaşı as the nurse

== Production ==
Filming for the film took place largely in İzmir and was completed in 19 days, whilst various scenes were also shot in Adana, Ankara and Istanbul, in line with the journey depicted in the story. The scenes set in the run-down hotel where the characters' lives intersect were filmed at the historic Saray Hotel on Oteller Street in Basmane, İzmir, which Hürriyet reported in 2017 had become a hotel for refugees due to economic reasons.

== Reception ==
=== Critical response ===
Film critic Atilla Dorsay stated that despite its technical flaws, Innocence is an unforgettable film that hits you like a "slap in the face" thanks to its unadulterated realism, sincerity and, above all, Güven Kıraç's magnificent performance. Can Dündar describes Innocence as a harrowing film that contains not a single lie, laying bare the harsh and bleak realities of life whilst, despite all its darkness and hopelessness, revealing the pure love at the heart of humanity and the fact that "we are all innocent". Oral Çalışlar regards Innocence as a significant film which, through its heartfelt narrative and powerful performances, examines with striking realism the shifting moral codes of subcultures, the concept of honour, and the "tragedy of women in a male-dominated world". Sevin Okyay describes Innocence as a masterful masterpiece, crafted through creativity, authenticity and superb performances, particularly by Haluk Bilginer, which, despite financial constraints and health issues, debunks all financial excuses in cinema.

It was voted the 9th best Turkish film of the 21st century by the Turkish Film Critics Association (SİYAD) in 2015.

=== Accolades ===
Award	Year	Category	Recipient(s)	Result	Ref(s)
34th Antalya Golden Orange Film Festival	1997	Avni Tolunay Audience Award	Masumiyet	Won	
34th Antalya Golden Orange Film Festival	1997	Best Actress	Derya Alabora	Won	
34th Antalya Golden Orange Film Festival	1997	Best Supporting Actor	Haluk Bilginer	Won	
10th Ankara Film Festival	1998	Best Actress	Derya Alabora	Won	
10th Ankara Film Festival	1998	Best Actor	Haluk Bilginer	Won	
11th Golden Boll Film Festival	1997	Best Actress	Derya Alabora	Won	
11th Golden Boll Film Festival	1997	Best Actor	Haluk Bilginer	Won	
11th Golden Boll Film Festival	1997	Best Director	Zeki Demirkubuz	Won	
11th Golden Boll Film Festival	1997	Best Editing	Mevlüt Koçak	Won	
17th International Istanbul Film Festival	1998	N. F. Eczacıbaşı Foundation Best Turkish Film of the Year	Masumiyet	Won	

Awards
Preceded by Sen de Gitme	Golden Boll Award for Best Picture; 1997	Succeeded by not held
Preceded by Sen de Gitme	Golden Orange; Dr. Avni Tolunay Jury Special Award for Best Picture; 1997	Succeeded by Kaçıklık Diploması
