= Zeytin Ağacı =

2024 Turkish television drama series

- Genre: Action; Mystery; Romance; Drama
- Written by: Nuran Evren Şit
- Directed by: Burcu Alptekin; Erdem Tepegöz
- Starring: Tuba Büyüküstün; Seda Bakan; Boncuk Yılmaz
- Theme music composer: Toygar Işıklı
- Country of origin: Turkey
- Original language: Turkish
- No. of seasons: 3
- No. of episodes: 24

Production
- Producer: Onur Güvenatam
- Running time: 120 minutes

Original release
- Network: Netflix
- Release: 28 July 2022 – 24 June 2026

Another Self (Turkish: Zeytin Ağacı, "Olive Tree") is a Turkish romantic and drama series produced for Netflix by OGM Pictures, the first episode of which was released on 28 July 2022, directed by Burcu Alptekin and Erdem Tepegöz, written by Nuran Evren Şit, and starring Tuba Büyüküstün, Seda Bakan and Boncuk Yılmaz.

== Plot ==
The series chronicles the friendship between three friends who visit a seaside town, where through group meetings facilitated by Zaman Bey they find contact with their spirituality and each unexpectedly encounters an unresolved trauma from their family's past.

== Cast ==
- Tuba Büyüküstün – Ada
- Seda Bakan – Leyla
- Boncuk Yılmaz – Sevgi
- Murat Boz – Toprak
- Fırat Tanış – Zaman Bey
- Rıza Kocaoğlu – Tevfik Fikret (Fiko)
- Füsun Demirel – Mukadder (Muko)
- Serkan Altunorak – Selim
- Umut Kurt – Erdem
- Aytaç Şaşmaz – Diyar
- Nilüfer Açıkalın – Leman
- Gözde Kansu
- Ali İpin
- Selen Uçer

== Production ==
Nuran Evren Şit, the screenwriter, started attending family series meetings to overcome the sadness she experienced after losing her father, and then wrote the script of the series.

The series is directed by Burcu Alptekin, written by Nuran Evren Şit and produced by OGM Pictures.

=== Filming ===
Filming for the first season took place from July 1 to October 4, 2021, in Ayvalık, a seaside resort on the northwestern coast of Turkey, on the Aegean Sea. Filming for the second season has been underway since July 12 to 29 September 2023, always in Ayvalık.

== Episodes ==
Season	Episodes.	Publication Türkiye	Publication Italy
First season	8	2022	
Second season	8	2024	
Third season	8	2026	

== Distribution ==
The series, consisting of 24 episodes divided into three seasons, was released on the Netflix streaming service from 28 July 2022 to 24 June 2026: the first season was released on July 28, 2022, while the second season will be on 11 July 2024 and third on 24 June 2026.

== Acknowledgments ==
- International Izmir Film Festival
  - 2023: Nomination for Best Actress in a Digital Television Series for Tuba Büyüküstün
  - 2023: Award for Best Digital Television Series to Onur Güvenatam
- Pantene Golden Butterfly Awards
  - 2022: Nomination for Best Online Series for Another Self (Zeytin Ağacı)
  - 2022: Nomination for Best Director for Burcu Alptekin
