= The Lamb (2014 film) =

2014 film

- Film poster
- Directed by: Kutluğ Ataman
- Written by: Kutluğ Ataman
- Starring: Güven Kıraç
- Release date: 7 February 2014 (Berlin)
- Running time: 87 minutes
- Countries: Turkey; Germany
- Language: Turkish

The Lamb (Turkish: Kuzu) is a 2014 Turkish-German drama film directed by Kutluğ Ataman. The film had its premiere in the Panorama section of the 64th Berlin International Film Festival. It was awarded the Golden Orange for best film.

== Cast ==
- Nesrin Cavadzade as Medine
- Güven Kıraç as Muhtar
- Şerif Sezer as Leyla
- Taner Birsel as Adnan Bey
- Nursel Köse as Safiye
