= Derya Alabora =

Turkish actress

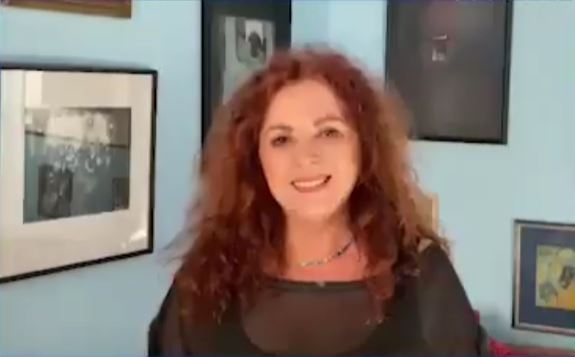
- Born: Derya Harupçi; August 19, 1959 (age 66); Istanbul, Turkey
- Occupation: Actress
- Spouse: Uğur Yücel
- Children: 1

Derya Alabora (born Derya Harupçi, August 19, 1959) is a Turkish actress.

She was born in Istanbul. She graduated from the theater department at the conservatory of Mimar Sinan University in 1982. She has won two Golden Orange awards for her roles in Masumiyet and Yengeç Sepeti.

== Filmography ==
Year	Title	Role	Notes	Comment
1987	Bir Kırık Bebek	Aysel	directed by Nisan Akman	credited as Derya Yücel
1993	Dönersen Islık Çal		directed by Orhan Oğuz	
1994	İz		directed by Yeşim Ustaoğlu	
1995	Yengeç Sepeti		directed by Yavuz Özkan	
1996	80. Adım	Aslı	directed by Tomris Giritlioğlu	
2001	Şaşıfelek Çıkmazı	Aysel	1996-1998	directed by Mahinur Ergun, Çağan Irmak(TV)
1997	Masumiyet	Uğur	directed by Zeki Demirkubuz	
1998	Bana Old and Wise'ı Çal	Eda	directed by Çağan Irmak	
1999	Salkım Hanımın Taneleri	Nimet	directed by Tomris Giritlioğlu	
1999	Renkli Dünyalar		directed by Ünal Küpeli(TV)	
2002	Aşk Meydan Savaşı	Mine	directed by Ömür Atay, Yalçın Yelence 2003(TV)	
2004	Simbiyotik		directed by Harun Özakıncı	not released in theaters
2005	Aşk Her Yaşta	Canan	directed by Raşit Çelikezer(TV)	
2007	Adem'in Trenleri	Şükran	directed by Barış Pirhasan	
2008	Pandora'nın Kutusu	Nesrin	directed by Yeşim Ustaoğlu	
2009	Es-Es	Selmin		
2009	Karanlıktakiler	Umay		
2009	Ezber		directed by Tolga Öztorun	
2010	Ayrılık			
2011 2012	Küçük Hanımefendi	Fehime		
2012	Çıplak Gerçek	Hazal's mother		
2014	A Most Wanted Man	Leyla Oktay	directed by Anton Corbijn	İnsan Avı
2014	Deliha	Aysel		
2016	İstanbul Sokakları			
2018	Deliha 2	Aysel		
2020	İyi Günde Kötü Günde	Meral		
2021	Acans	Nilgün		
2021	İçimizden Biri	Eva Vilson		
2021 2022	Kırmızı Oda	Vildan (Wilma)		
2022	Ah Nerede	Perihan		
2024	Her Seyin Basi Merkür			
2024	Yalı Çapkını	Ayla Kantarcı		
2025	Askin Dünkü Çocuklari	Muhtar Seyhan		

== Awards ==
- 3rd Yeşilçam Awards (March 23, 2010) - Best Supporting Actress for Pandora's Box (Turkish: Pandora’nın Kutusu)
- 27th Fajr International Film Festival, "World Panorama" section (February 3, 2009) - Best Performance for Pandora's Box, along with Tsilla Chelton and Ovul Avkiran

Awards
Preceded by Demet Akbağ	Golden Orange Award for Best Supporting Actress; 1994 for Yengeç Sepeti, İz	Succeeded by Tomris Oğüzalp
Preceded by Yasemin Alkaya; Hande Ataizi	Golden Orange Award for Best Actress; 1997 for Masumiyet	Succeeded by Yelda Kaymakçı Reynaud
Preceded by Yasemin Alkaya	Golden Boll Award for Best Actress; 1997 for Masumiyet	Succeeded by not held
