= A Madonna in Laleli =

- Film poster
- Directed by: Kudret Sabancı
- Written by: Serdar Akar; Önder Çakar; Kudret Sabancı
- Produced by: Sevil Demirci; Önder Çakar
- Starring: Güven Kıraç; İştar Gökseven; Cengiz Küçükayvaz; Fikret Urulu; Ella Manea
- Cinematography: Gökhan Atılmış; Ercan Durmuş
- Edited by: Nevzat Dişiaçık
- Music by: Uğur Yücel
- Production company: ProFilm
- Distributed by: Fida Film, TurkishFilmChannel
- Release date: March 12, 1999
- Country: Turkey
- Language: Turkish

A Madonna in Laleli (Turkish: Laleli'de bir Azize) is a 1998 Turkish drama film, written and directed by Kudret Sabancı, about a pimp and his two friends who try to sell a Russian prostitute as a “virgin” to a rich businessman. The film, which went on nationwide general release across Turkey on March 12, 1999, was shot concurrently with On Board (Turkish: Gemide), directed by Serdar Akar, and many of the main characters from the two films cross paths.

== Production ==
The film was shot on location in Laleli, Istanbul, Turkey.
