= İki Genç Kız =

2005 Turkish film by Kutluğ Ataman

- Film Poster
- Directed by: Kutluğ Ataman
- Written by: Kutluğ Ataman Perihan Mağden
- Produced by: Murat Çelikkan Gülen Guler Hurley
- Starring: Feride Çetin Vildan Atasever Hülya Avşar
- Cinematography: Emre Erkmen
- Edited by: Aziz İmamoğlu Lewo
- Music by: Replikas
- Distributed by: Yalan Dünya, Filmpot
- Release date: 29 April 2005
- Running time: 115 minutes
- Country: Turkey
- Language: Turkish

İki Genç Kız (The international working title is 2 Girls) is a 2005 Turkish film by Kutluğ Ataman that won a Golden Orange award. It was produced by Gulen Guler Hurley and stars Feride Çetin, Vildan Atasever, and Hülya Avşar. The film is based on Perihan Mağden's novel İki Genç Kızın Romanı (translated into English as 2 Girls), and it follows the novel's plot closely, although it diverges from it at some points.

The film is about two teenage girls, Behiye (Feride Çetin) and Handan (Vildan Atasever), with contrasting characteristics and backgrounds, forming a close relationship with sexual implications. As they become closer and closer the relationship becomes more fragile, and the impossibility of the survival of their relationship becomes more evident over time. Economic, social, psychological, and sexual problems come in the way.

Experimental band Replikas provided the music for the film, which was published in 2006 on the Film Müzikleri album.

== Awards ==
The movie won 14 prizes in 2005 at the Antalya Golden Orange Film Festival, the most prestigious film awards in Turkey. These awards included Best Actress for Vildan Atasever, Best Cinematography for Emre Erkmen, and Best Director for Kutluğ Ataman. Kutluğ Ataman was also awarded Best Director at the Istanbul International Film Festival for this film.

Awards
| Preceded by Meleğin Düşüşü | Golden Orange; Dr. Avni Tolunay Jury Special Award for Best Picture; 2005 | Succeeded by Takva |
