= Avaz (album) =

Studio album by Replikas
- Released: May 2005
- Recorded: February – March 2005
- Genre: Experimental rock
- Length: 75:00
- Label: Doublemoon
- Producer: Wharton Tiers

Replikas chronology
| Dadaruhi (2002) | Avaz (2005) | Film Müzikleri (2006) |

Avaz is the third album by the Turkish band Replikas.

Spending a lot of their early career in dingy backstreet venues of Istanbul, Replikas - “great Beyoglu hopes” (the Wire, UK) – have never taken much notice of the mainstream making so much noise around them or tried to make themselves easy to classify. In a country where popular musicians face challenges when trying to stand out, Replikas have made a unique name for themselves.

Taking inspiration from Avant- and Kraut-Rock, and adding Turkish elements with bits of traditional or cultures spices, their new album Avaz has a new bounce and, compared with their previous two post-punk/noise albums, a return-to-roots feel. Perhaps this is best seen in the raw reworking of Ömür Sayacı, a song which appears on their previous album [Dadaruhi].

Producer Wharton Tiers (Sonic Youth, Glenn Branca, Dinosaur JR and White Zombie) has taken their material born in those crowded cellar bars and helped shape and guide their back-to-basics direction: guitars sound like guitars, electronics gain personality, and vocals are perfectly placed in a design where carefully constructed sound allows for wide open musical spaces.

Cult, alternative, underground, Avaz presents a myriad of new sounds which will be enjoyed not only by fans, but by a wider audience ready to seek out the cutting-edge creative voices of Istanbul.

== Track listing ==
1. Gece Kadar Rahatsız Etmiyor
2. İsimsizler
3. 0_1
4. Dayan
5. Bahar
6. Benden Yüksek
7. Ömür Sayacı
8. 70 Apartman Dairesi
9. Deli Halayı İki
10. Zift
11. Reddiye
12. Taş Var Köpek Yok (Bunalımlar cover - Hidden Track)

== Line up ==
- Gökçe Akçelik
- Selçuk Artut
- Orçun Baştürk
- Barkın Engin
- Erden Özer Yalçınkaya
