= FM (album) =

Studio album by Replikas
- Released: 2006
- Recorded: 2001–2004
- Genre: Experimental rock
- Length: 64:55
- Label: Pozitif

Replikas chronology
Avaz (2008)	FM (2006)	Zerre (2008)

FM (Film Müzikleri) is the fourth album by the Turkish band Replikas. The album is a compilation of two movie soundtracks: Maruf by Serdar Akar (2001) and İki Genç Kız by Kutluğ Ataman (2005). With İki Genç Kız, Replikas won the best soundtrack album award by SİYAD (Cinema Critics Association).

== Track listing ==
1. Aa
2. Siyah Deri Ceket
3. Restoran
4. Topal Ruh
5. Tuzla Blues
6. Leblebici Horror
7. .
8. Corazon Banana Bossanovası
9. Maruf
10. Hayırlı Olsun
11. Kavga
12. Abdül
13. Bilge
14. İffet
15. Kavga II
16. Kabir
17. Maruf II
18. Doğum
19. Hayalet
20. Cankız
21. Ateş
22. Meydan
23. Anneme Yemek Yedirmem Lazım
24. Bozuk İlahi
25. Hayırlı Olsun II

== Line up ==
- Gökçe Akçelik
- Selçuk Artut
- Orçun Baştürk
- Barkın Engin
- Erden Özer Yalçınkaya
