= 2 Girls =

2002 novel by Perihan Mağden

- Author: Perihan Mağden
- Original title: İki Genç Kızın Romanı
- Translator: Brendan Freely
- Language: Turkish
- Genre: Novel
- Publisher: Serpent's Tail
- Publication date: 2002
- Publication place: Turkey
- English publication date: 26 October 2005
- Media type: Print (Paperback)
- Pages: 224 pp (first edition, paperback)
- ISBN: 978-1-85242-899-0
- OCLC: 61529269

2 Girls (İki Genç Kızın Romanı in Turkish) is a novel by Turkish writer Perihan Mağden, first published in 2002. The novel tells the story of two teenager girls with polar characteristics drawn into each other, forming an intense friendship in milieu of man-dominated, materialistic, and oppressive pressures. The novel was translated in English by Brendan Freely and published in the United Kingdom in 2005. The novel was hailed by The Independent by the following remark, "Not since Salinger’s Catcher in the Rye has a writer animated adolescent anguish so vividly and compellingly."

== Plot summary ==
Bodies of several murdered men are found in Istanbul and the oppressive air is evident in the city.

Meanwhile, Behiye, rebellious, full of teenage angst, oppressed by her conservative family, achieves well in her university entrance exams and gets the chance to enter prestigious Boğaziçi University. This, however, does not take her angst away, but oppressions endure. Behiye's life, longing to get rid of her angst is changed drastically when she meets Handan, a beautiful and naive girl of her age who lives with her beautiful call girl mother.

In short time, Behiye becomes attached to Handan and moves into their apartment. The girls form and intense and unidentifiable relationship which has both romantic and sisterly implications. Their uniting relationship has to face social problems and is damaged by peer boys, academic expectations, economic difficulties, and most of all different cultural backgrounds. The story continues as step by step Handan painfully realizes the impossibility of their relationship.

== Film adaptation ==
The novel was adopted into film by Kutluğ Ataman in 2005 as İki Genç Kız and starred Feride Çetin as Behiye, Vildan Atasever as Handan, and Hülya Avşar as Leman, Handan's mother. The movie won three prizes in 2005 (Best Actress for Vildan Atasever, Best Cinematography for Emre Erkmen, and Best Director for Kutluğ Ataman) at Antalya Golden Orange Film Festival which gives out the most prestigious film awards in Turkey. Kutluğ Ataman was also awarded the Best Director in Istanbul International Film Festival with this film.
