= Erkan Can =

Turkish film and theatre actor (born 1958)

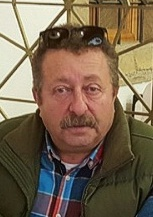
- Born: Erkan Can; 1 November 1958 (age 68); Bursa, Turkey
- Occupation: Actor
- Years active: 1974–present
- Spouses: Süeda Çil (m. 1994; div. 1998) Azita Can (m. 2001)
- Children: 1

Erkan Can (born 1 November 1958) is a Turkish film and theatre actor, who has won the Golden Orange for Best Actor twice for his roles in On Board and Takva: A Man's Fear of God, and the Asia Pacific Screen Award for Best Performance by an Actor for Takva: A Man's Fear of God.

== Biography ==
Erkan Can began acting in 1974 at the age of 16 with the local Bursa State Theater and took acting classes at the Industrial Vocational High School. From 1982 to 1984 he undertook his compulsory military service. In 1985 he entered the theatre department of the Istanbul State Conservatory and made his first screen appearance, alongside Kemal Sunal, in Davacı (1986) directed by Zeki Ökten before graduating in 1990.

From 1991 to 1992 he performed with the Bakirkoy Municipal Theatre. He had his first major roles in the television series Mahallenin Muhtarlari (1992) and Yalancı (1993) for TRT. He had a minor appearance in Sokaktaki Adam (1995), directed by Biket İlhan, and a featured role in the short Bana Old and Wise'ı Çal (1998), directed by Çağan Irmak before achieving success with On Board (1998), directed by Serdar Akar, for which he won best actor awards at film festivals in Antalya and Ankara as well as the Orhan Anzac Award.

A series of film a television roles followed, including appearances in Vizontele (2001), directed by Yılmaz Erdoğan and Ömer Faruk Sorak, and Istanbul Tales (2005), directed by Ümit Ünal et al. Appearances in Destiny (2006), directed by Zeki Demirkubuz, and The Edge of Heaven (2006), directed by Fatih Akın, were followed by, what Rekin Teksoy describes as, a "convincing performance" in Takva: A Man's Fear of God (2007), directed by Özer Kızıltan, for which he won best actor awards at film festivals in Antalya and Nuremberg as well as the Asia Pacific Screen Award.

== Filmography ==
- Davacı (1986) as Seyyar Satıcı
- Gençler (1989)
- Mahallenin Muhtarları (1992 TV series) as Temel
- Yalancı (1993 TV series) as Hulusi
- Sokaktaki Adam (1995)
- Bana Old and Wise'ı Çal (1998 short film) as Oguz
- On Board (Turkish: Gemide) (1998) as the Captain
- Offside (Turkish: Dar Alanda Kısa Paslaşmalar) (2000) as Suat
- Vizontele (2001) as Mela Hüseyin
- Azad (2002 TV series)
- Toss-Up (Turkish: Yazı Tura) (2004) as Firuz
- Istanbul Tales (Turkish: Anlat İstanbul) (2005) as Darbukacı
- O Şimdi Mahkum (2005) as Kazım
- Kapıları Açmak (2005 television series) as Suphi Yılmaz
- Pamuk Prenses 2 (2005 short film) as Serdar
- Fırtına (2006 TV series) as Oflu Hoca
- Destiny (Turkish: Kader) (2006) as İrfan
- The Edge of Heaven (German: Auf der anderen Seite / Turkish: Yaşamın Kıyısında) (2006)
- Takva: A Man's Fear of God (2007) as Muharrem
- Bıçak Sırtı (2007) as Numan
- Düğün Şarkıcısı (2008) as Kudret
- Black Dogs Barking (Turkish: Kara Köpekler Havlarken) (2009)
- Kapalıçarşı (2009 TV series)
- Black and White (Turkish: Siyah Beyaz) (2010)
- Kara Para Aşk (2015) as Tayyar
- Love, Bitter (Turkish: Acı Aşk) (2015–2016 TV series)
- A Crazy Love (Turkish: Bir Deli Sevda) (2017 TV series)
- My Dear Neighbor (Turkish: Sevgili Komşum) (2018 film) as Musa
- Müslüm (2018 film) as Limoncu Ali
- Çarpışma (2018–2019 TV series) as Haydar
- Love Likes Coincidences 2 (Turkish: Aşk Tesadüfleri Sever 2) (2020 film) as Kemal
- Tövbeler Olsun (2020 TV series) as Osman Necipli
- Saygı (2020 TV series) as Yavuz
- The Festival of Troubadours (2022 film) as Kul Yakup
- Tamirhane (2022 film)
- Kendi Yolumda (2022 film)
- Ben Bu Cihana Sığmazam (2022– TV series)
- Bursa Bülbülü (2023 film)
- Cenazemize Hoş Geldiniz (2023 film)
- Sadık Ahmet (2024)
- Cem Karaca'nın Gözyaşları (2024)
- Dilemma (2024)
- Zamanın Kapıları (2024)
- Dünya Varmış (2024)
- Hudutsuz Sevda (2024–2025)
- Meşru Gayrimeşru (2024)
- Ayakçı (2025)
- Aynı Yağmur Altında (2026)
- Altı Üstü İstanbul (2026)
- Tuzlu Kahve (2026)

Awards
Preceded by Tanju Gürsu	Golden Orange Award for Best Actor; 1998 for Gemide	Succeeded by Uğur Polat
Preceded by Şener Şen	Golden Orange Award for Best Actor; 2006 for Takva	Succeeded by Murat Han
