= Vildan Atasever =

Turkish film, TV and theatrical actress (born 1981)

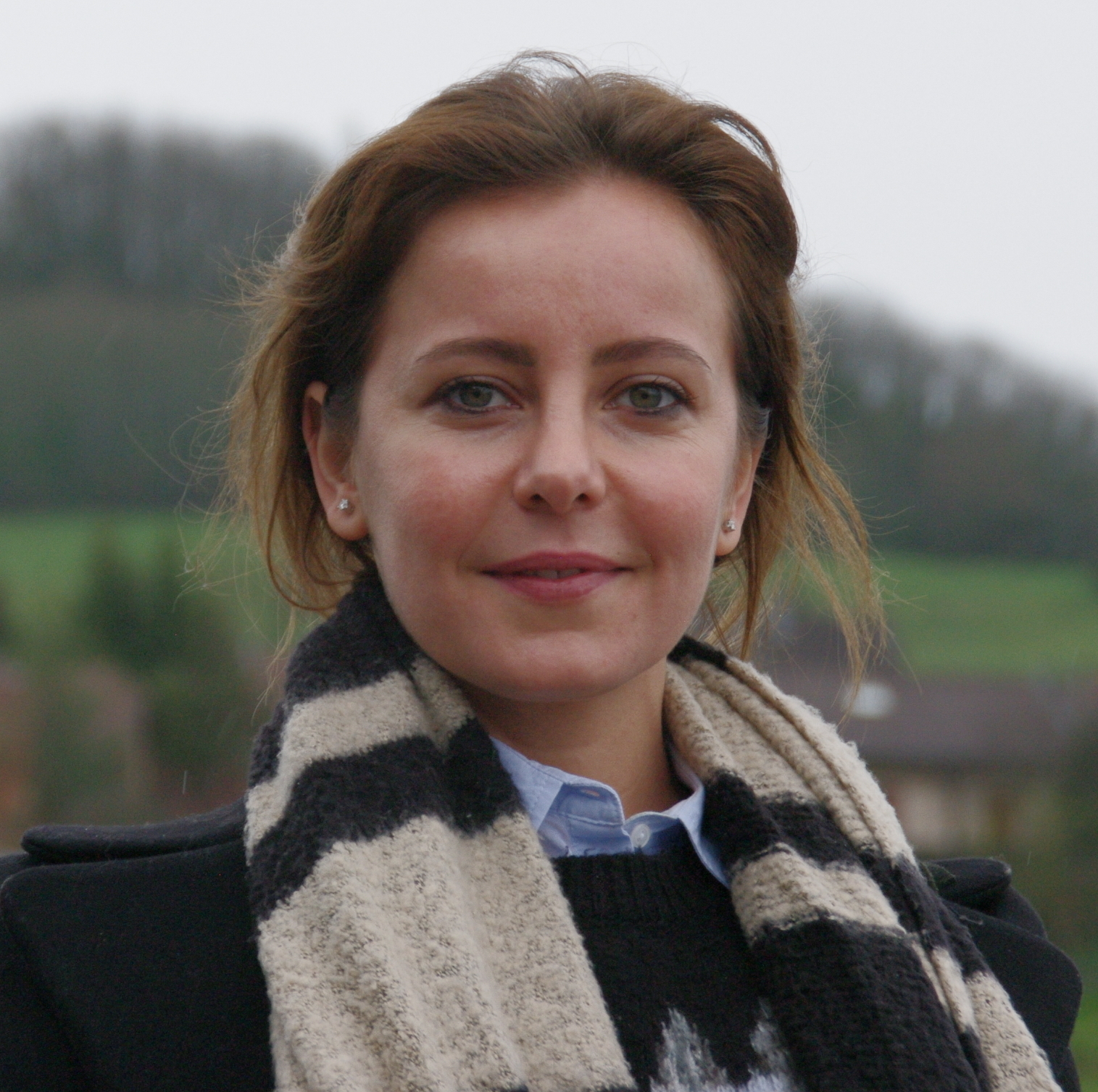
- Vildan Atasever in Vesoul, France (2016)
- Born: 26 July 1981 (age 44); Bursa, Turkey
- Occupation: Actress
- Years active: 2003–present
- Spouses: Taylan Kılınç (m. 2001; div. 2007) İsmail Hacıoğlu (m. 2010; div. 2015) Mehmet Erdem (m. 2021)

Vildan Atasever (born 26 July 1981) is a Turkish film, television and theatrical actress.

== Biography ==
She started acting at the age of fifteen. She joined hit crime series "Kurtlar Vadisi". Her first major part was in the hit revenge series Kadın İsterse where she played Hülya Avşar's daughter.

She has appeared together with her ex-husband İsmail Hacıoğlu in surreal period comedy series "Osmanlı Tokadı", series "Gece Sesleri" based on novel and film Meryem. She played two roles "Konstantina" and "İstanbul Demiroğlu" in Osmanlı Tokadı.

She played Handan in the film İki Genç Kız, also as Hülya Avşar's daughter, and won 2005 the Golden Orange award for Best Actress in the Leading Role. In 2006, she was nominated again for her performance in Kader, which won the Golden Orange for Best Film and earned her the Ankara Film Festival award for Best Actress.

She played in the popular series "Bıçak Sırtı" alongside Mehmet Günsür, Nejat İşler, Melisa Sözen, Canan Ergüder. She played in comedy series "Başrolde Aşk", "Klavye Delikanlıları". Klavye Delikanlıları is spin off series of franchise films Çakallarla Dans.

She also portrayed Hümaşah Sultan in Muhteşem Yüzyıl: Kösem and Saliha Sultan in Payitaht: Abdülhamid. She played in sport series "Tek Yürek" and medical series "Kasaba Doktoru".

== Filmography ==
Film
| Title | Year | Role | Note |
|---|---|---|---|
| 2005 | İki Genç Kız | Handan | |
| 2006 | Kader | Uğur | |
| 2008 | Osmanlı Cumhuriyeti | Asude | |
| 2013 | Meryem | Bride | |
| 2014 | Sürgün İnek | Gülay | |
| 2014 | Gece | Gülcan | |
| 2015 | Black Horse Memories | Vian | |
| 2019 | Dilsiz | Selma Aksel | |
| 2020 | Sadece Farklı | Ayşe | |
| 2022 | Bir Dilek Tut | | |
Streaming series
| Title | Year | Role | Note |
| 2021– | Bonkis | Ilgın | |
| 2023 | Ölüm Kime Yakışır | | |
TV series
| Title | Year | Role | Note |
| 2002 | Güz Gülleri | | |
| 2002 | Beşik Kertmesi | | |
| 2003-2004 | Kurtlar Vadisi | Nazlı Bekiroğlu | |
| 2004 | Azize | Müge | |
| 2004-2006 | Kadın İsterse | Buket | |
| 2007 | Yaralı Yürek | Beyaz | |
| 2007–2008 | Bıçak Sırtı | Güneş Sinan | |
| 2008–2009 | Gece Sesleri | Aslı | |
| 2010 | Samanyolu | Zülal Saral | |
| 2011–2012 | Başrolde Aşk | Öykü | |
| 2013-2014 | Osmanlı Tokadı | Kostantina / İstanbul | |
| 2015 | Yaz'ın Öyküsü | Umut Erpek | |
| 2016 | Muhteşem Yüzyıl: Kösem | Hümaşah Sultan | |
| 2017 | Klavye Delikanlıları | Seyran | |
| 2019 | Tek Yürek | İlknur Zengin | |
| 2020–2021 | Payitaht Abdülhamid | Saliha Sultan | |
| 2022–2023 | Kasaba Doktoru | Mine Yıldız | |
Short film
| Title | Year | Role | Note |
| 2021 | Aynı Gecenin Laciverti | Yağmur | |
Documentary
| Title | Year | Role | Note |
| 2012 | Miras Türkiye | Herself | |

== Awards ==
- 2005 – Golden Orange Award, Best Actress (İki Genç Kız)
- 2007 – Ankara Film Festival, Best Actress (Kader)
- 2015 – Sadri Alışık Theater and Cinema Awards, Best Actress in a Supporting Role (Gece)

Awards
| Preceded by Tülin Özen | Golden Orange Award for Best Actress; 2005 for İki Genç Kız shared with Beste Bereket | Succeeded by Sibel Kekilli |
