= Replikas =

Turkish rock band

- Origin: Istanbul, Turkey
- Genres: Rock; experimental rock; psychedelic rock
- Years active: 1996–present
- Labels: Ada Music; Doublemoon; Peyote Muzik
- Members: Barkın Engin; Orçun Baṣtürk; Selçuk Artut; Burak Tamer
- Past members: Erden Özer Yalçınkaya; Gökçe Akçelik
- Website: replikas.com

Replikas is a Turkish rock band from Istanbul that until August 2024 consisted of Gökçe Akçelik (vocals, guitar), Barkın Engin (guitar), Selçuk Artut (bass guitar), Orçun Baştürk (drums), and Burak Tamer (electronics). Akçelik died on 11 August 2024.

== History ==
Their debut album, Köledoyuran, was released in 2000 by Ada Music. Their second album, Dadaruhi, followed in 2002. The band's third record, Avaz, was produced by Wharton Tiers and released in May 2005 by Doublemoon.

In 2001, Replikas composed the soundtrack for the film Maruf, by Serdar Akar. In 2005, they wrote music for Kutluğ Ataman's İki Genç Kız, which won them the best film music award by the Turkish Film Critics Association a year later. The soundtracks were collected into an album titled Film Müzikleri, released by Pozitif in October 2006.

Replikas were featured in Fatih Akin's 2005 documentary film, Crossing the Bridge: The Sound of Istanbul.

The band released their fifth album, Zerre, in November 2008. Their sixth record, Biz Burada Yok İken, consists of covers of Anatolian pop music from 1965 to 1975 and was released by Ada Music in April 2012. In May 2013, they published EP No: 1, which contains seven instrumental tracks. A box set, including remastered versions of Köledoyuran and Dadaruhi as well as EP No: 1, came out later that year.

The band issued Alfred Hitchcock's Blackmail – Live at Istanbul Modern, in February 2014, on their Bandcamp page.

Vocalist Gökçe Akçelik died from cancer on 11 August 2024, at the age of 47.

== Band members ==
Current

- Barkın Engin – guitar
- Selçuk Artut – bass guitar
- Orçun Baştürk – drums
- Burak Tamer – electronics

Past

- Erden Özer Yalçınkaya
- Gökçe Akçelik – vocals, guitar

== Discography ==
Studio albums

- Köledoyuran (2000)
- Dadaruhi (2002)
- Avaz (2005)
- Film Müzikleri (2006)
- Zerre (2008)
- Biz Burada Yok İken (2012)

EPs

- EP No: 1 (2013)

Compilations

- Köledoyuran & Dadaruhi Remastered + EP No: 1 (Box set, 2013)

Live albums

- Alfred Hitchcock's Blackmail – Live at Istanbul Modern (2014)
