= Köledoyuran =

Studio album by Replikas
- Released: December 2000
- Recorded: July 17 – August 5, 2000
- Genre: Experimental rock, krautrock, anatolian rock, lo-fi/slacker rock
- Length: 64:29
- Label: Ada Music

Replikas chronology
Köledoyuran (2000)	Dadaruhi (2002)

Köledoyuran is the debut album by the Turkish band Replikas. The album was released by Ada Muzik in 2000.

The album, which was recorded live in 15 days, echoes in an authentic form all musical sources that have influenced the band's composing experience beginning from 1996. Their interest in local tunes and new musics evolving from them, which first manifested itself in Erkin Koray and then expanded into tekke* music, lo-fi and minimalist influences were incorporated in an unprocessed sound and recorded as if in a live performance, where unwanted sounds and slipups as well as improvisations were preserved. A strings group also contributed to the album.

Two main tendencies are apparent in Koledoyuran's lyrics: Allusions to the so-called Arabesque music, Sufi and Turkish psychedelic music and words abstracted from their meaning and featuring as individual sounds in the tracks.

- tekke (tekkiye) -- a Sufi center or community, made up of residences, a school, and a mosque or a place for performing the ceremonies of the order; sometimes called a lodge or monastery; ribat in Arabic.

In 2013, a remastered version of the album is released.

== Track listing ==
1. Leylek
2. Fakir
3. Akis
4. Çekirge Dansı
5. Acayip Korkak Birisiyim
6. Seyyah
7. Gulyabani Muzik
8. Yandım Çavuş
9. Hiç Ölü Zenci Yok
10. Yol
11. Kuh

== Line up ==
- Gökçe Akçelik
- Selçuk Artut
- Orçun Baştürk
- Barkın Engin
- Erden Özer Yalçınkaya
