= To Better Days (film) =

2012 film

- Film poster
- Turkish: Güzel Günler Görecegiz
- Directed by: Hasan Tolga Pulat
- Starring: Uğur Polat; Nesrin Cavadzade
- Release date: 3 February 2012
- Running time: 112 minutes
- Country: Turkey
- Language: Turkish

To Better Days (Turkish: Güzel Günler Görecegiz) is a 2012 Turkish drama film directed by Hasan Tolga Pulat.

== Cast ==
- Uğur Polat as İzzet
- Nesrin Cavadzade as Anna
- Buğra Gülsoy as Cumali
- Feride Çetin as Figen
- Barış Atay as Ali
