= Zerre =

Studio album by Replikas
- Released: November 2008
- Recorded: July – September 2008
- Genre: Experimental rock
- Length: 63
- Label: Peyote

Replikas chronology
Film Müzikleri (2006)	Zerre (2008)	Biz Burada Yok İken (2012)

Zerre is the fifth studio album by the band Replikas, released in November 2008 by Peyote Music.

In order to capture huge and organic sounds not found in a normal studio, the band went to Gokceada (an island in the Aegean Sea) and transformed a former prison into a recording studio. Production, recording and mix processes were carried out by Metin Bozkurt and Replikas members and mastering was done by Kim Rosen in New York’s West West Side Studios.

== Track listing ==
1. Bu Sıkıntı
2. Zerre
3. Bugün Varım Yarın Yokum
4. Dulcinea
5. Bitti Deme
6. Vakt-i Kerahat
7. Bozuk Düzen
8. Boş Vücut
9. Gülmediğin Günler
10. Hortum
11. Eksik
12. Ruh Feza
13. Tuaf (Hidden track)

== Line up ==
- Gökçe Akçelik
- Selçuk Artut
- Orçun Baştürk
- Barkın Engin
- Burak Tamer
