= Haldun Boysan =

Turkish actor (1958–2020)

- Born: 6 July 1958; Ankara, Turkey
- Died: 31 August 2020 (aged 62); Nevşehir, Turkey
- Resting place: Karşıyaka Cemetery
- Education: Ankara University School of Language and History – Geography
- Occupations: Actor, Voice Acting
- Notable work: Valley of the Wolves, On Board

Haldun Boysan (6 July 1958 – 31 August 2020) was a Turkish actor. One of his most notable works was in Valley of the Wolves as Tombalacı Mehmet.

== Death ==
Boysan died of heart attack on 31 August 2020 in his hotel room in Ürgüp district of Nevşehir at age of 62, during his stay in the city for the shooting of Maria ile Mustafa. He was buried at Karşıyaka Cemetery in Ankara.

== Selected filmography ==
Film
Year	Title	Role
2010	The Jackal	"Peru"
2006	Gen	
2005	Robbery Alla Turca	
2005	Whatever You Wish	
2004	Toss-Up	
1998	On Board	

TV
Year	Title	Role
2011	Canan	
2003	Valley of the Wolves	Tombalacı Mehmet
