= Takva: A Man's Fear of God =

- Film poster
- Directed by: Özer Kızıltan
- Written by: Önder Çakar
- Starring: Erkan Can; Güven Kıraç; Meray Ülgen
- Cinematography: Soykut Turan
- Music by: Gökçe Akçelik
- Production company: Corazón International
- Release date: 2006
- Running time: 96 minutes
- Countries: Turkey, Germany
- Language: Turkish

Takva: A Man's Fear of God (Turkish: Takva) is a 2006 Turkish language film directed by Özer Kızıltan. It was a Turkish and German co-production backed by Corazón International.

The film was Turkey's official submission for the Academy Award for Best Foreign Language Film at the 80th Academy Awards, but it was not nominated.

== Plot ==
Humble and devout Muharrem lives a solitary and meager existence of prayer and sexual abstinence. His extraordinary devotion attracts the attention of the Sheikh of an Istanbul Sufi order who offers him an administrative post as a manager for the seminary properties that support a school for orphans and poor children. Muharrem's new job throws him into the modern outside world he has not experienced before. He soon witnesses conflicting attitudes and dilemmas towards alcohol, charity and honesty. He notices that he himself has become proud, domineering and even dishonest. To make matters worse, Muharrem's inner peace is unnerved by the tormenting image of a seductive woman who tempts him in his dreams, both night and day. With the balance of his devotion now upset, his fear of God begins to eat away at his senses. He remains steadfast seeking forgiveness from Allah and guidance from his Sheikh in whom he has complete faith.

The Sheikh guides Muharrem, but he is left conflicted by the Sheikh's uncharitable insistence that rent is collected from everyone, even those who cannot pay. When Muharrem faces his greatest spiritual crises, the Sheikh is on retreat and is unavailable to counsel him. Muharrem, at first, is fair with money. He has compassion for the family that cannot pay their rent. When he is pushed by the Sheikh to collect from everyone, even those who cannot pay, a shift happens as he is faced with the crisis of following his inner voice and the directions of his beloved Sheikh.

Muharrem experiences a crisis of spirit, driven by his inner piousness clashing against the jarring change he sees in himself, brought upon by his new job that thrust him unprepared into the modern world. He ends up catatonic in bed, being cared for by the Sheikh's daughter, yet completely oblivious to her presence.

== Cast ==
- Erkan Can as Muharrem
- Güven Kıraç as Rauf
- Meray Ülgen as Sheikh
- Öznur Kula as Hacer
- Settar Tanrıöğen as Mr. Ali
- Engin Günaydın as Erol
- Erman Saban as Muhittin

== Reception ==
Jay Weissberg of Variety called it "A richly textured, thoughtful exploration of the hypocrisies inherent when fundamentalists engage in commercial ventures" and said it represents "a strong new voice in Turkish cinema."

=== Awards ===
- 2006 Antalya Golden Orange Film Festival: Best Actor, Best Art Direction, Best Cinematography, Best Costume Design, Best Music, Best Screenplay, Lab Competition, Make-Up, Special Jury Award
- 2007 Asia Pacific Screen Awards: Best Actor (also nominated for Best Feature Film and Best Screenplay)
- 2007 Berlin International Film Festival: FIPRESCI Prize
- 2007 Geneva Film Festival: Best Actor
- 2007 Istanbul International Film Festival: Best Film
- 2007 Nuremberg Film Festival "Turkey-Germany": Best Actor
- 2007 Sarajevo Film Festival: Heart of Sarajevo (Best Picture), Jury Prize (Best Film)
- 2006 Toronto International Film Festival: Innovation Award
- 2007 Tallinn Black Nights Film Festival: EurAsia Grand Prix

== See also ==
- Cinema of Turkey
- List of submissions to the 80th Academy Awards for Best Foreign Language Film

Awards
| Preceded by İki Genç Kız | Golden Orange; Dr. Avni Tolunay Jury Special Award for Best Picture; 2006 | Succeeded by The Edge of Heaven |
