= Nesrin Cavadzade =

Turkish actress of Azerbaijani origin (born 1982)

- Born: Nesrin Cavadzade; 30 July 1982 (age 44); Baku, Azerbaijan SSR, Soviet Union (now Azerbaijan)
- Education: Marmara University Communication and acting
- Occupation: Actress
- Years active: 2007–present
- Height: 1.68 m (5 ft 6 in)
- Parent: Feride Cavadzade
- Website: nesrincavadzade.com.tr

Nesrin Cavadzade (Azerbaijani: Nəsrin Cavadzadə; born 30 July 1982) is a Turkish actress of Azerbaijani origin. She is the granddaughter of prominent Azerbaijani scientist, Mirmammad Cavadzade's brother.

== Biography ==
Nesrin Cavadzade was born in Baku, Azerbaijan SSR (now Azerbaijan). She moved to Istanbul, Turkey with her mother at the age of 11.

Cavadzade attended Özel Bilgi Lisesi in Şişli for secondary school education and enrolled in the drama club. After secondary school, she attended Şişli Terakki Lisesi where she became a part of the drama club. While studying, she made five short films, which were screened at local and international festivals, including Berlinale Talent Campus, and received various prizes.

After graduating from Şişli Terakki High School, she enrolled in Marmara University, Fine Arts Faculty, Cinema and TV department. After graduating from Marmara University, she got coached for acting at Tekand Studyo Oyunculari.

She made her television debut in Yersiz Yurtsuz and then appeared in the different TV series, including Görüş Günü Kadınları and Küçük Ağa. She was cast in adaptations of Turkish classic novels Samanyolu, Al Yazmalım, Ağır Roman Yeni Dünya.

She was awarded the International Antalya Golden Orange Film Festival for Best Supporting Actress for her performance in Güzel Günler Göreceğiz in 2011 and Best Actress in Kuzu in 2014.

== Personal life ==
Nesrin Cavadzade has been dating with Turkish actor Gökhan Alkan since November 2020. In June 2022 rumors started that the couple had separated.

== Filmography ==
Film
Year	Title	Role	Award	Category	Notes
2003	Walk on Water	Abu Ibrahim's Wife	-	-	
2006	Pazar - Bir Ticaret Masalı	Pharmacists	-	-	
2007	Dilber'in Sekiz Günü	Dilber	Best Actress	Erzurum Dadaş Film Festival	
2007	Dilber'in Sekiz Günü	Dilber	Best Actress	Bursa Silk Road Film Festival	
2007	Dilber'in Sekiz Günü	Dilber	Best Actress	Ankara Film Festival	
2008	Gitmek: Benim Marlon ve Brandom	Derya	-	-	
2009	Acı	Torun	Best Actress	Erzurum Dadaş Film Festival	
2011	Güzel Günler Göreceğiz	Anna	Best Supporting Actress	Golden Orange	
2011	Güzel Günler Göreceğiz	Anna	Best Actress	Ankara Film Festival	
2011	Güzel Günler Göreceğiz	Anna	Actress of the Year	Magazine Journalists Association	
2012	Yangın Var	Asya	Best Actress	Ankara Film Festival	
2012	Yangın Var	Asya	Best Comedy Actress	Sadri Alisik Awards	
2012	Derin Nefes Al (Short film)	Nazlı	-	-	
2014	Annemin Şarkısı	Zeynep	-	-	
2014	Kuzu	Medine	Best Actress	Golden Orange	
2015	Son Mektup	Nihal Nurse			
2018	El desentierro	Tirana			
2020	Aşk Tesadüfleri Sever 2	Defne			
2020	Bir Annenin Sonatı	Nesrin			
2020	Cemil Şov	Burcu			
Web series
Year	Title	Role	Award	Category	
2017	Fi	Alara	-	-	Cameo appearance
2020	Bir Başkadır	Melisa	-	-	
TV series
Year	Title	Role	Award	Category	Notes
2006	Yersiz Yurtsuz	Suna	-	-	
2010	Samanyolu	Melek	-	-	
2012	Al Yazmalım	Ayça	-	-	
2012	Ağır Roman Yeni Dünya	Kara Leyla	-	-	
2013	Görüş Günü Kadınları	Lale	-	-	
2014	Küçük Ağa	Başak	-	-	
2015	Legends	Jamilla	-	-	
2016	Kış Güneşi	Efruz	-	-	
2016	Yüzyıllık Mühür	Nurse	-	-	
2017–2018	Bizim Hikaye	Tülay Sertkaya	-	-	Supporting role
2019–2021	Yasak Elma	Şahika Ekinci	-	-	Leading role
2021–2022	Üç Kuruş	Bahar	-	-	Leading role
2023–2024	Şahane Hayatım	Melisa Özsoy	-	-	Leading role
2024–2025	Sandık Kokusu	Ayça	-	-	Supporting role
2026–present	Daha 17	Şebnem Akkaya	-	-	Leading role

== Discography ==
- 2020: "Bir Rüya Gördüm" (with Elif Doğan) – from the Love Likes Coincidences 2 soundtrack
