= İsmail Ege Şaşmaz =

Turkish actor

- Born: 25 November 1993 (age 32); Manisa, Turkey
- Occupation: Actor
- Years active: 2013–present
- Known for: Güneşi Beklerken; Lise Devriyesi; Aşk Laftan Anlamaz; Sen Çal Kapımı
- Spouse: Hande Ünal (m. 2021)
- Children: 1
- Relatives: Aytaç Şaşmaz (brother)

İsmail Ege Şaşmaz (born on 25 November 1993, Manisa) is a Turkish actor.

== Career ==
He had his first acting experience in Manisa Municipality Inter-high School Theater Competition with a role in the play titled Acil Servis. He graduated from Polinas Anatolian and Industrial Vocational High School and finished his education at Manisa Municipality Conservatory.

Şaşmaz started his career with role in the popular series Güneşi Beklerken. He then continued his career by appearing in commercial films of some brands. Şaşmaz later joined the cast of Serçe Sarayı and had a leading role in the Günebakan as Rüzgar and youth series Lise Devriyesi.

After playing the role of Serdar in the TV series Aşk Yalanı Sever, he rose to prominence in 2018 by portraying the character of Mehmet in the historical series Mehmetçik Kut'ül Amare. Between 2020 and 2021, he portrayed the role of Faysal in the historical series Uyanış: Büyük Selçuklu, a spy sent by Hassan-i Sabbah. He recently played the role of "Harun Karasu" in the drama series El Kızı. He portrayed the Anatolian rock star Barış Akarsu in the film Barış Akarsu "Merhaba".

== Filmography ==
Television
Year	Title	Role	Notes
2013–2014	Güneşi Beklerken	Barış	Leading role
2015	Günebakan	Rüzgar	Leading role
2015	Serçe Sarayı	Tolga	Supporting role
2016	Aşk Yalanı Sever	Serdar	Supporting role
2016	Aşk Laftan Anlamaz	İbrahim	Supporting role
2017	Lise Devriyesi	Fırat Soyer	Leading role
2018–2019	Mehmetçik Kutülamare	Mehmet	Leading role
2020	Sen Çal Kapımı	Kaan Karadağ	Supporting role
2020–2021	Uyanış: Büyük Selçuklu	Faysal	Supporting role
2021–2022	Elkızı	Harun Karasu	Leading role
Film
Year	Title	Role	Notes
2022	Barış Akarsu "Merhaba"	Barış Akarsu	Leading role
TBD	Cenazemize Hoş Geldin	Ozan	Leading role
