= Mehmet Uluğ =

Mehmet Uluğ (13 April 1959 – 20 November 2013) was a Turkish businessman, promoter and music curator. He is best known as the founder of Turkey's leading concert, festival and live show company Pozitif, record label Doublemoon and music club Babylon.

== Early life ==
Uluğ was born in Istanbul as the eldest of two children of Semra Uluğ and Şahap Uluğ. Uluğ graduated from Robert College in 1978 after being educated at Yeşilköy Primary School and British High School. Uluğ attended Clemson University in the United States of America, completing his educational life in 1984 with an undergraduate and graduate degree in Electrical Engineering.

== Career ==
Uluğ worked in Baltimore as a research engineer between 1984 and 1987. In 1988 moved from the US and after a 6-month-long trip to the Far East, he returned to Turkey. Dreaming of building a bridge between jazz music and Turkish music listeners and adding a new dimension to Istanbul's very static cultural state, Uluğ chose to march in a more unconventional path than building a career in engineering.

In 1988, Uluğ founded Turkey's biggest music and event company Pozitif along with his highschool friend Cem Yegül. In 1989, Uluğ's brother, Ahmet Uluğ joined this duo forming the partnership that continued for 25 years until Mehmet Uluğ's death.

Beginning from its early years, Pozitif was one of the important building blocks in Turkey's music and artistic event arena. Being the leader in transforming Istanbul's cultural scene with its events, Pozitif team organized Turkey's biggest and most inclusive festivals such as Akbank Jazz Festival, Blues Festival, One Love Festival and Rock’n Coke. Uluğ's dream festival Cappadox was brought to life one year after his death, in Kapadokya.

Aside from the festivals, in the period of Uluğ's management, Pozitif team brought together the Turkish audience with many megastars like U2, Rihanna, Red Hot Chili Peppers, world renown shows like Cirque Du Soleil and the avant garde artists of the alternative world Patti Smith, Cecil Taylor and John Zorn.

Uluğ established Babylon under the framework of Pozitif. Asmalımescit, where the club was founded in 1999, subsequently developed into an active district. Since opening, Babylon hosted local and international artists across multiple disciplines. Uluğ later expanded Babylon to Alaçatı and Çeşme, founding Babylon Çeşme and Babylon Alaçatı. He also contributed to the Babylon Soundgarden Festival, Babylon Magazine, and Radio Babylon.

Another enterprise of Uluğ was the creation of the independent record label Doublemoon Records with the Pozitif team in 1998. With the aim of bringing together music from different roots, Uluğ worked on 13 important albums as the executive producer and published more than 50 albums with his partners.

=== Albums as executive producer ===
Date	Artist	Album	Producer
1998	Craig Harris featuring Barboros Erköse	The Nation of Imagination	Mehmet Uluğ & Cem Yegül
1998	Aydın Esen	Timescape	Mehmet Uluğ
1999	Burhan Öçal & Jamaaladeen Tacuma ft. Natacha Atlas	Groove Alla Turca	Mehmet Uluğ & Cem Yegül
1999	Hüsnü Şenlendirici & Laço Tayfa	Laço Tayfa	Mehmet Uluğ
2001	Aziza	Kendi Dünyam	Mehmet Uluğ & Cem Yegül
2002	Mercan Dede	Nar	Mehmet Uluğ
2002	Hüsnü Şenlendirici & Laço Tayfa	Hicaz Dolap	Mehmet Uluğ
2005	Hüsnü Şenlendirici	Hüsn-ü Klarnet	Mehmet Uluğ
2005	Orhan Osman	Maziden	Mehmet Uluğ
2007	Hüsnü Şenlendirici & Aytaç Doğan & İsmail Tunçbilek	Taksim Trio	Mehmet Uluğ & Ahmet Uluğ
2009	Bora Uzer	B1	Mehmet Uluğ
2010	Hüsnü Şenlendirici & Trio Chios	Ege'nin İki Yanı	Mehmet Uluğ
2010	Selen Gülün	Answers	Mehmet Uluğ

== Personal life ==
Uluğ's son Ali Uluğ was born in 1998. In 2009 he met future wife, Ana Fortes, a Brazilian graphic designer and her two daughters, Antonia and Olivia, which he adopted. The five of them lived internationally. Diagnosed with cancer in 2012, he died of the disease on November 20, 2013.
