= Atatürk Cultural Center (Antalya) =

Multi-purpose convention complex in Antalya, Turkey

- Interactive map of Atatürk Cultural Center
- Former names: Antalya Cultural Center (1996-2019)
- Address: Meltem Mah., Sakıp Sabancı Bulvarı
- Location: Antalya, Turkey
- Coordinates: 36.8859°N 30.66846°E
- Owner: Antalya Culture and Art Foundation (AKSAV)

Construction
- Opened: 1996

The Atatürk Cultural Center (Turkish: Atatürk Kültür Merkezi) is a multi-purpose convention complex located in Antalya, Turkey. Inaugurated in 1996, it is owned by the Antalya Culture and Art Foundation (AKSAV). The complex with a total covered area of 9,000 m^{2} consists of two halls and two foyers for exhibition purposes. Home of the State Opera and Ballet, the State Theater and the State Symphony Orchestra in Antalya, the center hosts various cultural and art events, including the Antalya Golden Orange Film Festival.

The complex is renamed from Antalya Cultural Center since late 2019, currently named after Mustafa Kemal Atatürk.

== Aspendos Hall ==
Named after the ancient Roman Aspendos amphitheater in the vicinity, it is the largest hall in the complex and is equipped with state-of-the-art audio and video technology. It has a 125-seat balcony and 692-seat capacity arena totalling 817 seats.

== Perge Hall ==
The second hall in the complex is named after the ancient Greek site Perga, not far from Antalya. The hall, suitable for cinema, theater and concert purposes, can hold 338 people.

== Foyers ==
The two foyers of Atatürk Cultural Center with a total area of 1,000 m^{2} in two floors serve space for relaxing, receptions or exhibitions.
