= Biz Burada Yok İken =

Studio album by Replikas
- Released: April 2012
- Recorded: March – August 2011
- Genre: Experimental rock
- Length: 42:41
- Label: Ada Music

Replikas chronology
Zerre (2008)	Biz Burada Yok İken (2012)	EP No:1 (2013)

Biz Burada Yok İken is the sixth album by the Turkish band Replikas. All songs on this project were covered by the band. It is a collection of the music style Anatolian rock taken from the 1960s and 1970s in Turkey.

== Track listing ==
1. Aya Bak Yıldıza Bak
2. Kaleden Kaleye Şahin Uçurdum
3. Köprüden Geçti Gelin
4. Hudey Hudey
5. Kaşık Havası
6. Bir Ayrılık Bir Yoksulluk Bir Ölüm
7. Ölüm Allahın Emri
8. Çiçek Dağı
9. Suya Giden Allı Gelin
10. Panayır Günü
11. Sür Efem Atını

== Personnel ==
- Gökçe Akçelik - vocals, guitar
- Selçuk Artut - bass guitar
- Orçun Baştürk - drums
- Barkın Engin - guitar
- Burak Tamer - synthesizers
- Cahit Berkay - yaylı tambur in Ölüm Allahın Emri
- Tunçay Korkmaz - harmonica in Kaleden Kaleye Şahin Uçurdum
- Ece Özey - vocals in Hudey Hudey & Suya Giden Allı Gelin
