= Nuran Evren Şit =

Turkish screenwriter

Nuran Evren Şit (born 22 January 1980) is a Turkish screenwriter.

Evren Sit was born in Ankara in 1980. She graduated from Mimar Sinan Fine Arts University at the Cinema-TV Department. During her student life she became a student of Memduh Ün, Lütfi Ömer Akad, Metin Erksan, Duygu Sağıroğlu, who wrote and directed award-winning short films. Since 2001, she started to work as assistant director and casting manager in film and commercial sets. She worked as a casting manager in the films Where's Firuze and G.O.R.A., and as an assistant director in the film The Magician. She stepped into screenwriting with the TV series "Elveda Rumeli". After this series, she wrote her first feature film, the second most watched movie of 2011, Love Likes Coincidences. The German-Turkish co-production 8 Seconds, which she co-wrote, was released in February 2015.

== Filmography ==
- Elveda Rumeli - TV dizisi, ATV, 2007-2009
- Hanımın Çiftliği - TV dizisi, Kanal D, 2010-2011
- Love Likes Coincidences - 2011
- Gün Akşam Oldu - TV dizisi, Show TV 2011
- Sen de Gitme - TV dizisi, TRT 1, 2012
- A.Ş.K. - TV dizisi, Kanal D, 2013
- İntikam - TV dizisi, Kanal D, 2013-2014
- Hayat Yolunda - TV dizisi, Kanal D, 2014
- 8 Saniye - 2015
- Şeref Meselesi - TV dizisi, Kanal D, 2015
- Vatanım Sensin - TV dizisi, Kanal D, 2016-2017
- Love Likes Coincidences 2 - 2020
- The Gift (Turkish TV series) - İnternet dizisi, Netflix, 2019-2020
- Zeytin Ağacı - İnternet dizisi, Netflix, 2022-
- Last Call For İstanbul - İnternet filmi, Netflix, Yakında
