= Never My Soul! =

2001 film by Kutluğ Ataman

Never My Soul! is a 2001 Turkish film by Kutluğ Ataman. The film, with a duration of about two hours, is about Ceyhan Firat, a Turkish trans woman residing in Switzerland who makes her living as a sex worker. Firat pretends to be Turkish actress Türkan Şoray. The film's title refers to a common saying in Turkish film: a girl who is being targeted by a rapist may tell him that he could have her body but never her soul.
