= Antalya State Symphony Orchestra =

Symphony orchestra in Turkey

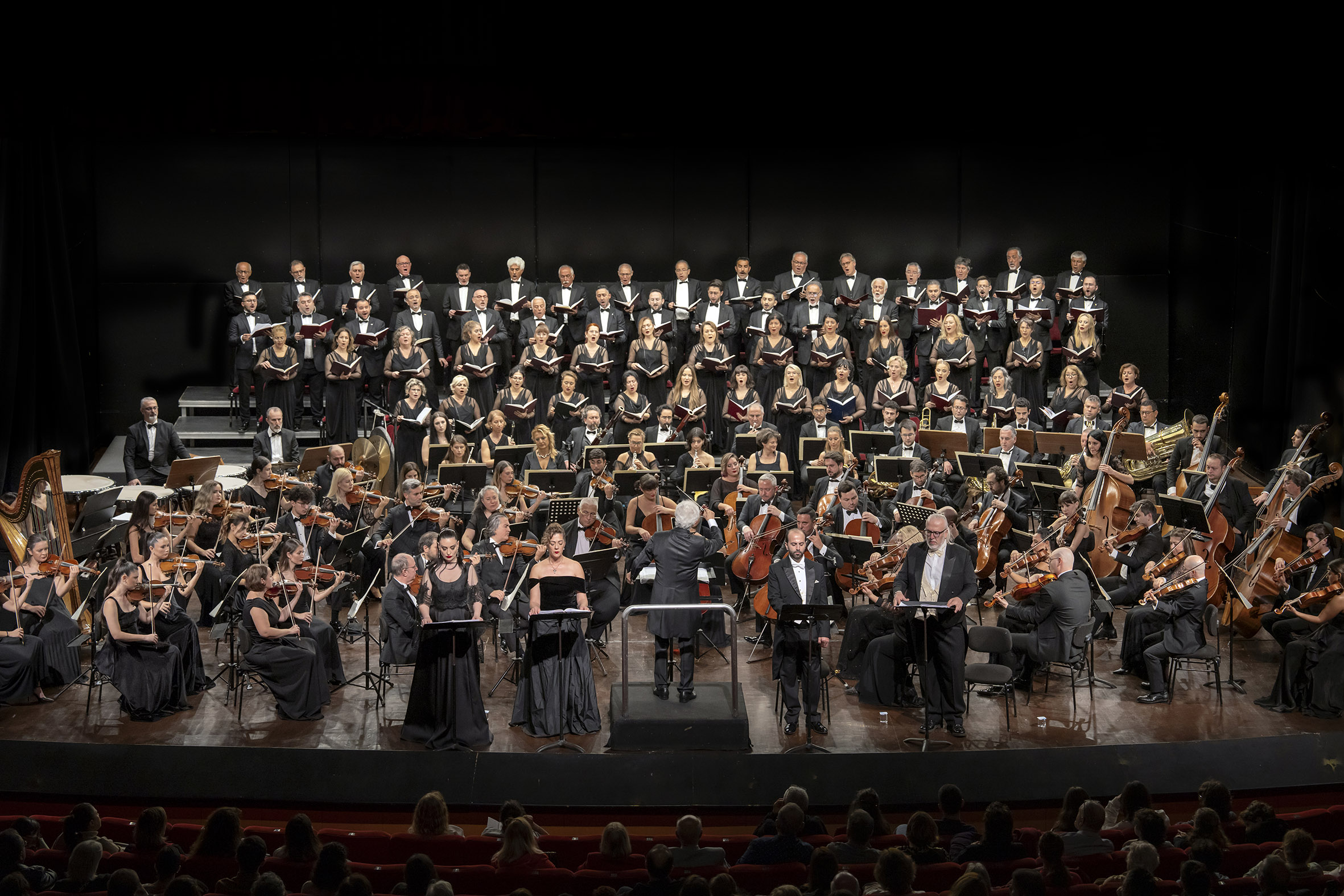
Antlalya State Symphony Orchestra, 2024

The Antalya State Symphony Orchestra is an orchestra located in Antalya.

Founded in 1995 as Antalya Chamber Orchestra later became symphony orchestra in 1997. Orchestra's first principal conductor was Inci Özdil, the first woman conductor of Turkey. After Inci Ozdil, Gürer Aykal became the principal conductor in 1999. The orchestra gave its first concert at December 6, 1999. Since 1999, the orchestra gives regular concerts at Atatürk Cultural Center (Antalya).
