= Feride Çetin =

Turkish actress (born 1980)

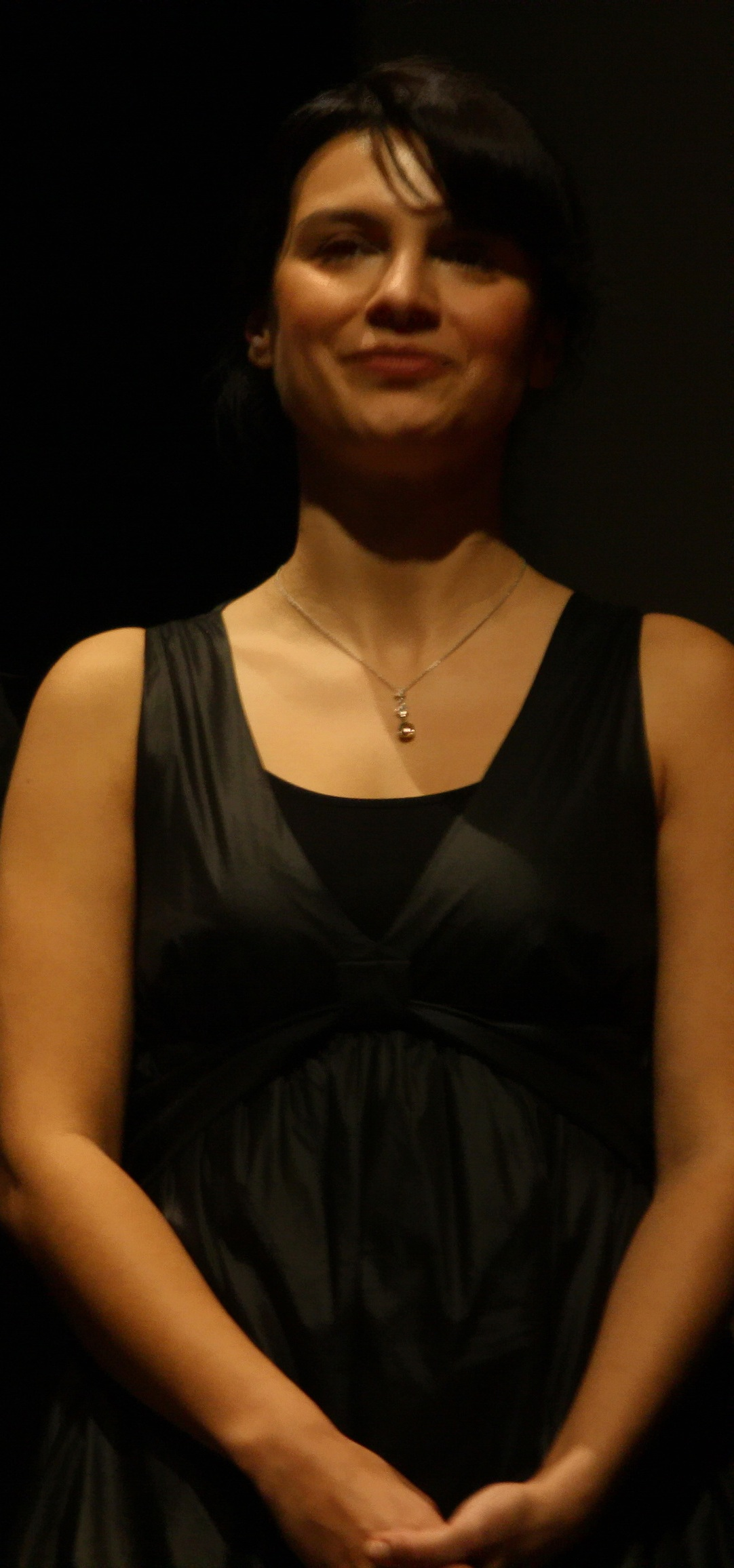
- Born: 5 November 1980 (age 45); Istanbul, Turkey
- Occupation: Actress
- Years active: 2005–present
- Spouse: Murat Özer (m. 2019; div. 2021)
- Children: 1

Feride Çetin (born 5 November 1980) is a Turkish actress. She has appeared in more than ten films since 2005.

== Selected filmography ==
Film
Year	Title	Role	Notes
2005	İki Genç Kız		
2008	The Messenger	Havva	
2012	To Better Days	Figen	

TV
Year	Title	Role
2010-2011	Aşk ve Ceza	Çiçek Moran Baldar
2019–2021	Hercai	Zehra Şadoğlu
