= Naci Taşdöğen =

Turkish actor

Naci Taşdöğen (born 3 March 1963 in Istanbul) is a Turkish actor.

He performed in the Emret Komutanım and O Şimdi Asker series.

== Filmography ==
=== Films ===
- Ağır Roman : 1997
- Mektup : 1997
- Üçüncü Sayfa : 1998
- Asansör : 1998
- Gemide : 1999
- Sahne : 2006
- Emret Komutanım Şah Mat : 2010
- Çakal : 2010
- Şenlikname Bir İstanbul Masalı : 2010
- Van Gölü Canavarı : 2012
- Eyyvah Eyvah 3: 2014

=== TV series ===
- Süper Baba : 1993
- Çiçek Taksi : 1995
- Vaka-i Zaptiye : 2002
- Lise Defteri : 2003
- Emret Komutanım : 2005-2008
- Emret Komutanım Yeniden : 2013
