= The Trace (film) =

1994 film

- Directed by: Yeşim Ustaoğlu
- Written by: Tayfun Pirselimoglu
- Starring: Derya Alabora; Aytaç Arman
- Cinematography: Ugur Icbak
- Release date: 1994
- Running time: 116 minutes
- Country: Turkey
- Language: Turkish

The Trace (Turkish: İz) is a 1994 Turkish thriller film directed by Yeşim Ustaoğlu. It was entered into the 19th Moscow International Film Festival.

== Cast ==
- Derya Alabora
- Aytaç Arman as Kemal
