= Boncuk Yılmaz =

Turkish actress

- Born: Boncuk Makbule Yılmaz; 13 May 1981 (age 43); Istanbul, Turkey
- Occupation: Actress
- Years active: 2004–present
- Spouse: Fethi Kantarcı (m. 2013)
- Children: 1

Boncuk Makbule Yılmaz (born 13 May 1981) is a Turkish actress.

== Life and career ==
Yılmaz is a graduate of Anadolu University School of Communication. She was discovered by director Ahmet Uluçay, and in 2004 made her debut with the movie Karpuz Kabuğundan Gemiler Yapmak. With her role in this movie, she received the "Hope-giving Young Actress Award" at the 26th SİYAD Turkish Cinema Awards. After the movie's success, she was offered roles in TV series such as Kızlar Yurdu, Sıla and Haneler. She won nationwide fame with her role in the series Çukur.

In May 2013, she married actor Fethi Kantarcı, with whom she has a child.

== Filmography ==
=== Film ===
- Karpuz Kabuğundan Gemiler Yapmak (Nihal) 2004
- Sessiz Gece 2005
- Kızlar Yurdu 2006
- Kader Postası 2019

=== Television ===
- Sıla (Narin) 2006
- Haneler 2009
- Mazi Kalbimde Yaradır 2011
- Bir Yastıkta 2013
- Böyle Bitmesin 2013
- Çukur (Saadet) 2017–2021
- Another Self (Sevgi) 2022
- Ateş Kuşları (Nazmiye) 2023–
