= Love Likes Coincidences 2 =

- Directed by: Ömer Faruk Sorak; İpek Sorak
- Written by: Nuran Evren Şit
- Produced by: Ömer Faruk Sorak; Alp Tekin
- Starring: Nesrin Cavadzade; Yiğit Kirazcı; Elif Doğan; Aytaç Şaşmaz
- Cinematography: Oktay Başpınar
- Music by: Ozan Çolakoğlu
- Production companies: Hüzzam Film; Böcek Film
- Distributed by: CGV Mars Distribution
- Release date: 31 January 2020
- Running time: 121 minutes
- Country: Turkey
- Language: Turkish

Love Likes Coincidences 2 (Turkish: Aşk Tesadüfleri Sever 2) is a 2020 Turkish romantic drama film directed by Ömer Faruk Sorak and İpek Sorak.

== Cast ==
- Nesrin Cavadzade (Defne)
- Yiğit Kirazcı (Kerem)
- Elif Doğan (Die Junga Sema)
- Aytaç Şaşmaz (Der Junge Niko)
- Hülya Gülşen Irmak (Nuran)
- Levent Can (Yorgo)
- Türkü Turan (Aylin)
- Eli Mango (Marika)
- Zuhal Olcay (Sema)
- Uğur Polat (Niko)
- Erkan Can (Kemal)
