= Ali and Ramazan =

2010 novel by Perihan Mağden

- First edition (Turkish)
- Author: Perihan Mağden
- Original title: Ali ile Ramazan
- Translator: Ruth Whitehouse
- Language: Turkish
- Genre: Novel
- Publisher: Doğan Kitap
- Publication date: 2010
- Publication place: Turkey
- English publication date: 3 April 2012
- Pages: 196 pp (first edition, paperback)
- ISBN: 978-161-109-141-0 (first edition, paperback)
- OCLC: 783202761

Ali and Ramazan (Ali ile Ramazan in Turkish) is a novel by Turkish writer Perihan Mağden, first published in 2010. The novel tells the story of two teenager gay boys with polar characteristics drawn into each other, forming an intense friendship in milieu of man-dominated, materialistic, and oppressive pressures. The novel was translated in English by Ruth Whitehouse and published in the Las Vegas, United States in 2012. Theater play "GarajIstanbul" was exhibited in 2013.

== Plot summary ==
Ali and Ramazan are two boys from very different backgrounds who land in the same Istanbul orphanage. They quickly see eye to eye and fall into a loving relationship as children, bringing light to one another and to the other orphans in their dreary adopted home. Ramazan is a charmer, the school master's favorite, the clown among the boys, and the only one with a real handle on things outside the orphanage's walls. He takes Ali under his wing, and by the time they turn eighteen and are loosed onto Istanbul's mean streets, Ali and Ramazan are a pair. What happens next is both tragic and beautiful, a testament to love finding its way even among the least visible citizens on Turkey's mean streets.
