= Babylon Istanbul =

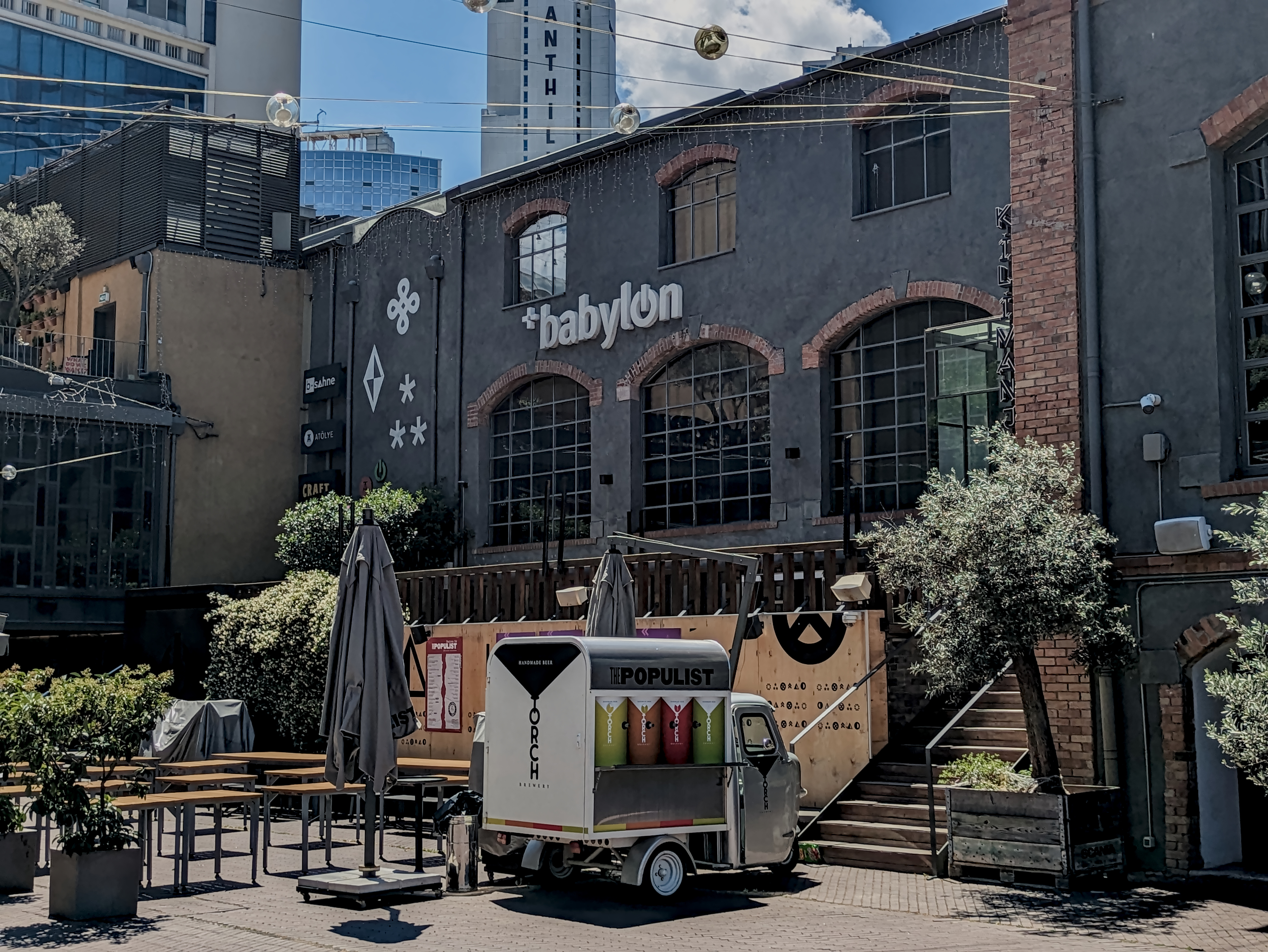

Babylon Istanbul is a music venue located in Istanbul, Turkey. It was opened by Pozitif founder Mehmet Uluğ on April 23, 1999, with a concert by John Lurie & the Lounge Lizards . In 2010, Babylon launched its Lounge restaurant, in a street just behind the main venue. The club started "happy hours", warm-ups and after parties hosted by various DJs as well. At its height the Venue could host 450 standing guests or 350 tables plus a standing audience. The original venue hosted hundreds of bands and over 1,500 concerts.

Babylon İstanbul has now moved to a new location in Bomontiada created out of an old beer-making factory in Feriköy. In summer it relocates to two separate beach venues: Babylon Kilyos on the Black Sea coast just north of İstanbul and Babylon Aya Yorgi at Çeşme, near İzmir.
