= Perihan Mağden =

Turkish writer (born 1960)

- Born: 24 August 1960 (age 66); Istanbul, Turkey
- Education: Robert College, Istanbul; Boğaziçi University
- Occupations: writer, columnist
- Employer(s): Radikal, Taraf
- Notable work: 2 Girls

Perihan Mağden (born 24 August 1960) is a Turkish writer. She was a columnist for the newspaper Taraf. She was tried and acquitted for calling for opening the possibility of conscientious objection to mandatory military service in Turkey.

== Biography ==
Mağden was born in 1960 in Istanbul. She is Georgian on her father’s side, and half Russian/Balkan on her mother's side. After graduating from Robert College of Istanbul, she studied psychology at Boğaziçi University. By her own account, she was an unruly student—and her mother was proud of it.

One of the most famous writers in young Turkish literature, Perihan Magden has spent some time at Yaddo, the famous artists' community. Mağden is a single mother who lives in Istanbul.

In addition to writing editorial columns for Turkish newspapers (including Radikal, 2001 - 2008), Mağden has also published fictional novels and a collection of poetry. Mağden's novel İki Genç Kızın Romanı (Two Girls), published in 2005 by Serpent's Tail, was praised for pushing "Turkish beyond its conventional literary patterns" and compared to J.D. Salinger's Catcher in the Rye for the way she had captured adolescent anguish.

She spent some years in far east countries. Her novel "Two Girls" has been a big success in homeland Turkey and became an award winning movie premiered in Europe in London Film Festival right after Sydney. She is the author of "Messenger Boy Murders" (Haberci Çocuk Cinayetleri), "The Companion" (Refakatçi) and "Escape" (Biz kimden kaciyorduk, Anne?). Her latest novel "Ali and Ramazan" published in 2010 in Turkish and now out by Suhrkamp (German) and AmazonCrossing (USA). Her latest essays on Turkey are collected under the title "Political Essays" (Politik Yazılar). Her novels have been translated into 19 languages including English, French, German, Korean, Portuguese, Spanish, Greek and Russian.

== Activism ==
Perihan Magden is one of the most inventive and outspoken writers of our time. The way she twists and turns the Turkish language, the delight she takes in the thrust and pull of popular culture, and her brilliant forays into subjects that everyone thinks about and then decides not to put into words, 'just in case'—these have earned her the love of her readers and the respect of her fellow writers.

— Orhan Pamuk.

Mağden is one of several journalists and writers charged for "threatening Turkey's unity or the integrity of the state."

After the assassination of Hrant Dink, she was offered security protection.

In December 2007, she received a fourteen-month suspended sentence for insulting Aytaç Gül, then governor of Yüksekova.

In early 2016 Mağden was charged with “insult to the President” (art. 301 of the Turkish Penal Code), having commented in an interview about the September 2015 confiscation of Nokta Mag that Erdoğan “is behaving like a wild tiger, a wild animal in a corner”. The journalist interviewing her, Tunca Öğreten, was charged too for publishing the words. Mağden denied accusations saying that “as a writer I have applied a literary form of similitude while criticizing the raiding of the Nokta Mag.” They risk up to 4 years in prison. The first trial will take place in Istanbul on 12 May 2016.

=== Conscientious objection lawsuit ===
Mağden was prosecuted by the Turkish government in relation to a December 2005 column in the weekly news magazine Yeni Aktuel. In the column she strongly defended the actions of Mehmet Tarhan, a young Turkish man jailed for his refusal to perform mandatory military service. In this column, titled "Conscientious Objection is a Human Right", Mağden stated that the United Nations acknowledges conscientious objection as a human right.

In response to the column, the Turkish military accused her of attempting to turn the Turkish people against military service and filed a complaint against her. A warrant was issued for her prosecution in April 2006 and her trial was in late July; the most severe sentence she could have faced if convicted under Article 301 of the Turkish Penal Code was three years' imprisonment. Under Turkish law, there is no provision for conscientious objection to mandatory military service.

When asked about her situation, Mağden replied, "It's shocking that they are putting me on trial. I've no idea what will happen. The case could finish tomorrow or it could stretch on and on. The unnerving thing about the courts is they are so unpredictable, it's like a lottery. It's torture."

Her prosecution was criticized by human rights groups around the world. The European Union closely monitored the lawsuit. In a show of support for Mağden, newspapers in Turkey have republished the column that led to criminal charges against her.

She was acquitted on 27 July 2006. The court concluded that she exercised her right of freedom of speech.

== English language bibliography ==
Five of Mağden's novels have been published in English.

=== The Messenger Boy Murders ===
The Messenger Boy Murders (Turkish title: Haberci Çocuk Cinayetleri) is a 1991 novel by Turkish writer and columnist Perihan Mağden republished in 2003 by Milet Books in English language translation by Richard Hamer.

The publisher describes the novel as, "a darkly comic, irreverent and hypnotic tale, an exploration of humanity's endless absurdity and its futile attempts to create perfection, cleverly wrapped in a murder mystery," "from a popular and innovative Turkish author."

Maureen Freely writing in Cornucopia states, "Set in a city that feels Russian but is populated with Chinese names, full of nineteenth-century languor but speckled with Hollywood references and overshadowed by a villainous fertility expert, it is difficult to categorise, impossible to put down."

A review in Sunday's Zaman states, "The Messenger Boy Murders, like life, unfolds its secrets one by one. What is the ultimate secret? Well, now, that would be telling!"

Editions

- The Messenger Boy Murders. trans. Richard Hamer. London: Milet Books. 2003. ISBN 978-1-84059-364-8.

=== The Companion ===
The Companion (Turkish title: Refakatçi) is 1994 novel by Turkish writer Perihan Mağden republished in 2015 by Everest Press in English translation by Deniz Erol.

=== 2 Girls ===
2 Girls (Turkish title:İki Genç Kızın Romanı) is a 2002 novel by Turkish writer and columnist Perihan Mağden republished in 2005 by Serpent's Tail in English language translation by Brendan Freely.

Editions

- 2 Girls. trans. Brendan Freely. London: Serpent's Tail. 2005. ISBN 978-1-85242-899-0.

=== Escape ===
Escape (a.k.a. Whom Were We Running From?, Turkish title: Biz Kimden Kaçıyorduk Anne) is 2007 novel by Turkish writer Perihan Mağden republished in 2010 by Everest Press and in 2012 by AmazonCrossing in English translation by Kenneth Dakan.

Editions

- Whom Were We Running From?. trans. Kenneth Dakan. Turkey: Everest Press. 2010 [2007]. ISBN 978-9752897908.
- Escape. trans. Kenneth Dakan. Turkey: AmazonCrossing. 2012 [2007]. ISBN 978-1611091434.

=== Ali and Ramazan ===
Ali and Ramazan (Turkish title: Ali ile Ramazan) is a 2010 novel by Turkish writer and columnist Perihan Mağden republished in 2012 by AmazonCrossing in English language translation by Ruth Whitehouse.

Two boys from different backgrounds land in the same Istanbul orphanage. They quickly see eye to eye and fall into a loving relationship as children, bringing light to one another and to the other orphans in their adopted home. Ramazan is a charmer, the school master’s favorite (which we later learn is not such a positive thing), the clown among the boys, and the only one with a handle on things outside the orphanage’s walls. He takes Ali under his wing, and by the time they turn eighteen and are loosed onto Istanbul's mean streets, Ali and Ramazan are a pair.

Editions

- Ali and Ramazan. trans. Ruth Whitehouse. USA: Amazon Crossing. 2011. ISBN 978-1-61109-141-0.

=== On-line translations ===
- The Secret Meanings of Unappreciated Words at Boğaziçi University and Words Without Borders .
- Kitchen Accidents at Boğaziçi University .
- Courage Does Not Reign at Boğaziçi University and Words Without Borders .

== Awards ==
- Turkish Publishers Association's Freedom of Thought and Expression Prize (2008)

== Selected bibliography ==
- Haberci Çocuk Cinayetleri (Messenger Boy Murders), 1991
- Refakatçi (The Companion), novel, 1994
- Mutfak Kazaları (Kitchen Accidents). poetry collection, 1995
- Hiç Bunları Kendine Dert Etmeye Değer mi? (Is it Worth Bothering With These?), 1997
- Kapı Açık Arkanı Dön ve Çık (Turn Around and Walk Out the Door), 1998
- Fakat Ne Yazık ki Sokak Boştu (Unfortunately, However, The Street was Empty), 1999
- İki Genç Kızın Romanı (Two Girls), novel, 2002
- Politik Yazılar (Political Essays), Essays, 2006
- Biz Kimden Kaçıyorduk Anne? (Who Were We Running From, Mother?), novel, 2007
- Ali and Ramazan (Ali ile Ramazan), novel, 2010
