= Doublemoon =

Record label in Istanbul, Turkey

- Founded: 1998
- Founder: Mehmet Uluğ
- Genre: World Music, Fusion, Jazz
- Country of origin: TR
- Location: Istanbul
- Official website: www.doublemoon.com.tr

Doublemoon Records, founded in 1998 as an offshoot of Pozitif Productions, is an independent pioneering record label based in Istanbul, Turkey, dedicated to spreading the city's music around the world. Doublemoon has concentrated on world fusion music, bringing together jazz and world, acoustic and electronic, and occidental and oriental music.

Doublemoon has received a number of accolades including being selected as one of the three most important independent record labels by the French publication, Vibrations; reaching number one on the European World Music Charts; and being listed among the top ten record labels in the world by WOMEX/World Music Charts Europe. Doublemoon's artists play the sound of Istanbul at some of the world's biggest festivals like Montreux Jazz, Montreal Jazz, Exi, and Roskilde. they have appeared on the covers of magazines like Global Rhythm and received nominations for the BBC Radio 3 world music awards.

== Genres ==
World fusion, jazz and world, acoustic and electronic, Sufi-electronica, groove alla turca, gypsy funk, oriental hip hop and Anatolian blues.

== Notable artists ==
- Baba Zula
- Mercan Dede
- Orientation
- Replikas
- Wax Poetic

== Doublemoon compilations ==
- East 2 West Vol.1 Global Departures (2003, DM016)
- East 2 West Vol.2 Ethno Electronic Tales (2004, DM021)
- East 2 West Vol.3 İstanbul Strait Up (2005, DM025)
- East 2 West Vol.4 Crossing Continents (2006, DM037)
- Doublemoon Remixed (2007, DM039)
- Istanbul Twilight (2007, DM043)
- Doublemoon Kadınları (2008, DM044)
- Doublemoon Remixed 2 (2009, DM049)

== Subsidiary labels ==
- Pozitif Records
- Voltaj
- Numoon

== See also ==
- List of record labels
- List of world music record labels
