= Aytaç Şaşmaz =

Turkish actor and singer (born 1998)

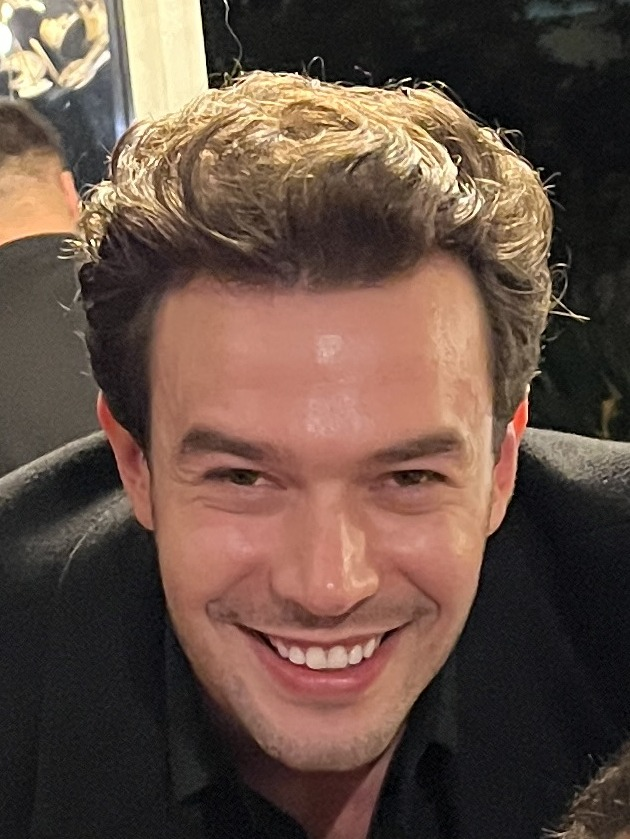
- Aytaç Şaşmaz in 2023
- Born: 4 August 1998 (age 27); Manisa, Turkey
- Occupations: Actor; singer
- Years active: 2017–present
- Relatives: İsmail Ege Şaşmaz (brother)

Aytaç Şaşmaz (born 4 August 1998) is a Turkish actor and singer.

He started acting at the age of 18, when he participated in his high school’s plays. He then joined the Metropolitan Municipality Theatre in Manisa as a trainee.

He is the second of 3 brothers. His older brother, İsmail Ege Şaşmaz, is also an actor. He has a younger brother, Yalın.

== Career ==
=== Films ===
After taking acting classes in Manisa, Şaşmaz moved to Istanbul and made his cinematic debut in 2017 with the role of Omer in Kötü Çocuk alongside Tolga Sarıtaş and Afra Saraçoğlu.

In 2020, he played the leading role of young Niko in the movie Aşk Tesadüfleri Sever 2. The heartwarming movie is based on a true love story that overcomes obstacles, time, and distance.

He plays the role of Baha in the drama/romantic movie Hatıran Yeter, which was released in cinemas on 16 February 2024. The movie tells the life story of a young man with hearing and speech disabilities, and the obstacles he faces in life especially after losing the love of his life (Leyla), and the struggles he went through to reunite with his daughter.

=== TV series ===
He played Feyzullah Altiparmak in the military series Söz (2017–2019) which was nominated for International Emmy Awards.

He further rose to prominence with his performance in Hekimoğlu (2019-2021), an adaptation of the American series House.

In 2021, he scored his first leading role in a TV series as Bora Doğrusöz in the romantic comedy series Baht Oyunu.

In 2022, Şaşmaz played the role of Evren in Fox's TV series Darmaduman, a Turkish adaptation of the American television series, Beverly Hills, 90210.

In 2023, he played the role of Onur Beyoğlu in Altın Kafes, a Turkish adaptation of the Korean series The Last Empress..

In July 2025, he joined Ay Yapim's ambitious production Sevdiğim Sensin in the lead role of Erkan Aldur opposite Helin Kandemir who plays the female lead Dicle Aldur. The show aired on 12 February 2026 and concluded it's successful first season with 15 episodes. The show is set to return with its second season in the fall of 2026.

=== Web series ===
Aytaç Şaşmaz joined Netflix's second season of Zeytin Ağacı (Another Self) in the role of Diyar, a young man whose life changes after meeting Ada. The series was released on Netflix worldwide on 11 July 2024.

=== Theatre ===
Early in 2023, he played the role of Metin in the theatrical production Eksik. The play sheds light on a tensioned father-son relationship.

== Filmography ==
Television
Year	Title	Role	Notes
2017–2019	Söz	Feyzullah Altıparmak	Supporting role
2019–2021	Hekimoğlu	Emre Acar	Leading role
2021	Baht Oyunu	Bora Doğrusöz	Leading role
2022	Darmaduman	Evren	Leading role
2023	Altın Kafes	Onur Beyoğlu	Leading role
2026–present	Sevdiğim Sensin	Erkan Aldur	Leading role
Film
Year	Title	Role	Notes
2017	Kötü Çocuk	Ömer	Supporting role
2018	Aşk Tesadüfleri Sever 2	Der Junga Niko	Leading role
2024	Hatıran Yeter	Baha	Leading role
2025	Lefter: Bir Ordinaryüs Hikayesi	Metin Oktay	Guest Role

== Discography ==
Singles

- "Barındığım Hikaye" (2020)
- "Vazgeçme" (2022)
