= Kutluğ Ataman =

Turkish film director and artist (born 1961)

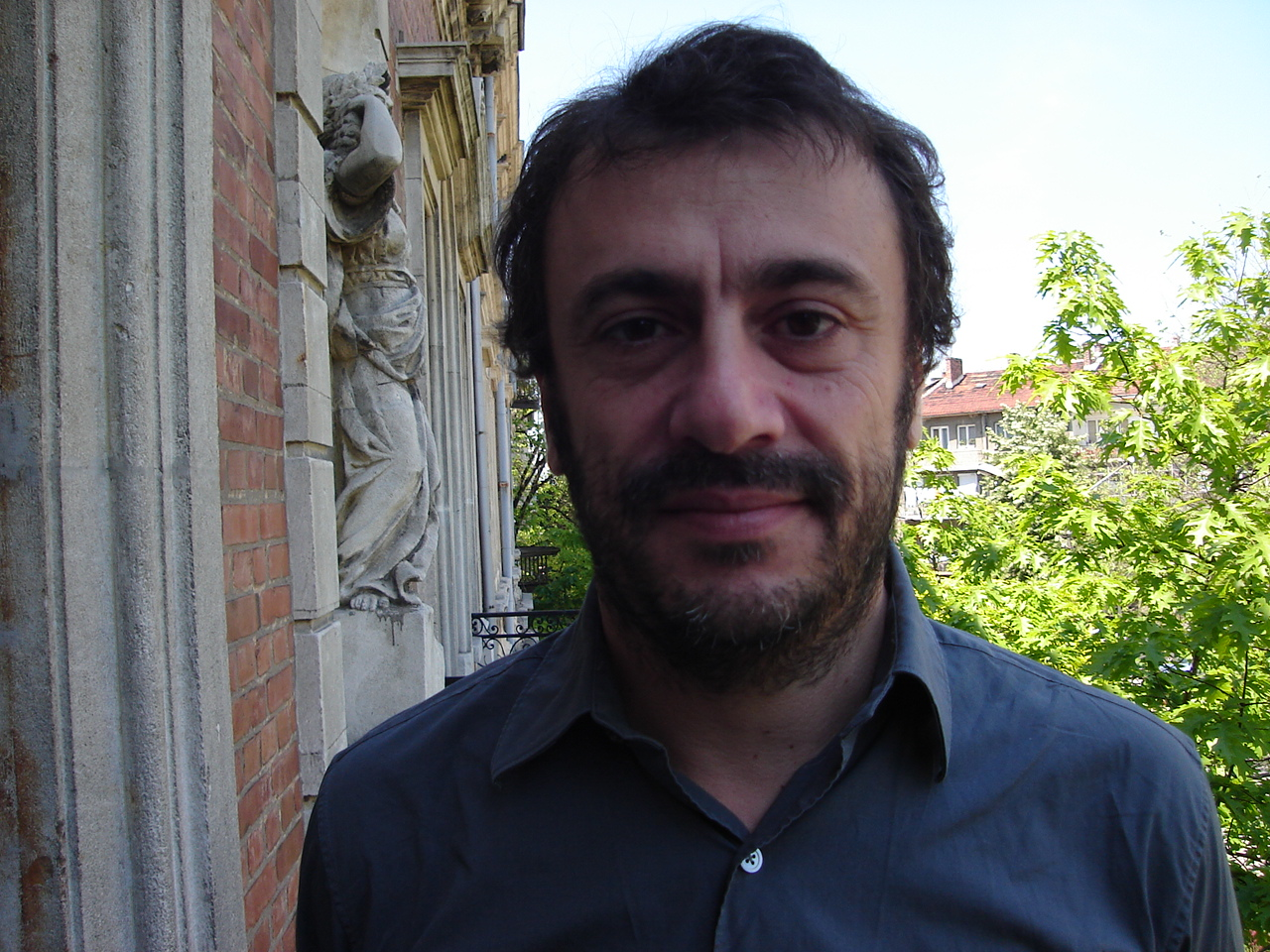
- Born: 1961 (age 64–65)
- Education: University of California
- Known for: video art, documentary films
- Notable work: İki Genç Kız, Küba, The Lamb, Twelve

Kutluğ Ataman (born 1961 in Istanbul Turkey) is an acclaimed Turkish-American contemporary artist and feature filmmaker. Ataman's films are known for their strong characterization and humanity. His early art works examine the ways in which people and communities create and rewrite their identities through self-expression, blurring the line between reality and fiction. His later works focus on history and geography as man-made constructs. He won the Carnegie Prize for his work Kuba in 2004. In the same year he was nominated for Turner Prize for his work Twelve.

== Biography ==
Ataman was born in Istanbul in 1961; his father was a diplomat. As a young man, he was involved in filming the events of the 1980 Turkish coup d'état, which led to his imprisonment and torture. After his release, in 1981 he left Turkey and moved to California, remaining there for 15 years. He graduated in 1985 with a BA in Film from the University of California and completed his MFA in 1988

His first feature film, Dark Waters (Karanlık Sular), made in 1994, intriguingly utilised the metaphor of the vampire to encapsulate the crisis of contemporary Turkish culture. It was awarded five filmmaking prizes, including at the Istanbul International Film Festival. Openly gay himself, Ataman's work often explores sexual identity and gender. In 1997 Ataman directed an eight-hour video, entitled kutluğ ataman’s semiha b. unplugged, focusing his hand-held camera on one of Turkey's legends, the opera diva Semiha Berksoy, once publicly persecuted for an affair with the exiled communist poet Nazım Hikmet, now found living on in obscurity as an octogenarian in an eccentric dream world of her own creation. Ms. Berksoy served both as Ataman's studied subject, as well as his shining star. This work was invited to several important art biennials and international film festivals. This was followed by his piece Women Who Wear Wigs featured four Turkish women – a revolutionary whose face remained obscured, well-known journalist and breast cancer survivor Nevval Sevindi, an anonymous devout Muslim student, and a transsexual.

Ataman's next production, the feature film Lola+Bilidikid, made in 1998, was set in the trans subculture within the Turkish guest-worker community of Berlin, Germany. It won the Jury Special Prize at the 49th International Berlin Film Festival, after screening as the opening film of the festival's Panorama Section in 1999. It also won the “Best Film” award at New York's NewFest. In 2005, Ataman directed his next feature film, 2 Girls, from his screenplay adaptation of the best-selling Turkish novel, “2 Girls” (İki Genç Kızın Romanı) by Perihan Mağden. The film tells the story of two teenage girls with contrasting personalities and backgrounds, who form a close bond with sexual implications, and by extension examines the economic, social, psychological, and sexual pressures shaping today's youth. It won three prizes in 2005 for “Best Actress,” “Best Cinematography,” and “Best Director” at Antalya Film Festival, home to Turkey's most prestigious film award. With this film Ataman also received a “Best Director” prize at the Istanbul International Film Festival and won the “Special Jury Prize” at the 8th Festival of Asian Cinema (New Delhi, India) in 2006. In April 2009 he was the Chair of the Jury of the Istanbul International Film Festival. His film Journey to the Moon was shown outside competition at this festival. In June 2009 Journey to the Moon was shown at the 31st Moscow International Film Festival. It was also screened at the BFI 53rd London Film Festival in October 2009, and in February 2011 had screenings in Brussels and Rotterdam as part of the Routes Award public programme.

In competition at the 2004 Carnegie International at the Carnegie Museum of Art in Pittsburgh, he won the top award and one of America's highest honours in art, the “Carnegie Prize.” In 2004, he was one of the four short-listed artists for the “Turner Prize” organized by London's prestigious Tate Gallery. In 2003, Kutluğ Ataman was named “best artist of the year” by the London Observer newspaper. In January 2011 annual Almanac ArtAsiaPacific selected him one of the 2010 5 Artists of the Year.

Kutluğ Ataman was the 2011 laureate of the third European Cultural Fund ‘Routes’ Princess Margriet Award for cultural diversity.

His art works have been shown at Documenta (2002), the Venice Biennale (1999) as well as the Biennials in São Paulo (2002, 2010), Berlin (2001) and Istanbul (1997, 2003, 2007 and 2011). He was also in the Tate's Triennial in 2003. His solo exhibitions include The Enemy Inside Me, a major retrospective at Istanbul Modern, Turkey (2010/11), Mesopotamian Dramaturgies at MAXXI – the National Museum of 21st Century Arts, Rome (2010) and at ARTER in Istanbul (2011). He featured two works from Mesopotamian Dramaturgies at the Brighton Festival, UK in 2011. Other major solo exhibitions have included fff at the Whitechapel Gallery, London (2010), Kutluğ Ataman: Paradise and Küba, Ludwig Museum, Cologne (2009/10), Lentos Kunstmuseum, Linz (2009) Vancouver Art Gallery (2008), Paradise, the Orange County Museum of Art, Newport Beach, California (2007), De-Regulation With the Work of Kutluğ Ataman, MuHKA, Belgium (2006), Küba, Artangel (2005), Museum of Contemporary Art, Sydney (2005), Long Streams, Serpentine Gallery, London and Nikolaj, Copenhagen Contemporary Art Centre, Denmark (2002).

His art works are in major international collections, including MoMA, New York, Tate Modern, London n, Thyssen-Bornemisza Art Contemporary, Vienna, the Dimitris Daskalopoulos Collection, Athens, Istanbul Modern, Istanbul and the Carnegie Museum, Pittsburgh.

Mesopotamian Dramaturgies – a multi-element work was exhibited in Linz as part of European Capital of Culture 2009, and subsequently at the Ludwig Museum in Cologne before its showing at MAXXI in Rome in 2010 and ARTER in Istanbul in 2011. Ataman's works were also in exhibitions in Istanbul, Basel, Lille, Milan, Gothenburg, Paris, and Malmö through 2009, in Istanbul, São Paulo, Berlin, Vienna, Sydney and London in 2010 and Istanbul, Bilbao, Brighton and London in 2011. In April 2009 Kutluğ Ataman was the Chair of the Jury of the International Istanbul Film Festival.

A full-length documentary film directed by Metin Çavuş about Ataman's art career was issued at the end of 2011. In 2012 Ataman released Sılsel, a “timeline” made out of artworks contributed by viewers for the Istanbul International Theatre Festival. One attached to the other, the contributions formed a “timeline” that created an interactive “sky” containing messages from the viewers for the future while also defining the times in which the artwork was created.

In 2013 Ataman made a public announcement that he needed a clean break from his film and art practice in order to be able to concentrate on “the next chapter”. Since then, he delivered only The Portrait of Sakıp Sabancı in 2014, a large video sculpture made out of nearly ten thousand LED screens. The work was exhibited at the Venice Biennial main show in 2015 and at The Royal Academy, London in 2016.

In 2014, Ataman released a new feature film called The Lamb which premiered at Berlinale's Panorama Special. The film won numerous awards internationally, as well as Best Film, Best Director, Best Actress, Best Supporting Actress in Antalya Film Festival.

In 2015, Kutluğ Ataman initiated Palanga Art and Architecture Farm (PAAF) at a ranch he established in the mountains of Erzincan, Turkey. While declaring the ranch as “a living land art”, he is pioneering environmentally respectful and responsible holistic farming methods in Turkey. Adopting the slogan “from agriculture to culture”, he has commissioned several architectural projects by both new and well established architects. Since 2016, Palanga's various buildings have won numerous international architecture awards for innovation and experimentation. In 2019 he was selected “Employer of the Year 2019” by Arkitera.

Presently, Ataman is working for his new feature film Hilal, Feza, And Other Planets that will be out in 2022. The project won many awards during the work in progress, including Eurimages Award for the scenario from Rome Film Festival, ARTE Award for the scenario from Sarajevo Film Festival, Cinefoundation Atelier selection from Cannes Film Festival and Turkish-German Co-Production Development Fund Award from Istanbul Film Festival.

He recently showed Küba at the inaugural exhibition of NEON, Athens. Küba will open at Reina Sofia, Madrid as part of Thyssen Bornemisza's contemporary art collection. Ataman recently joined Niru Ratnam Gallery, London where he will be exhibiting new works in 2022. His present concentration is large scale sculpture, land art, photography and video art.

== Artworks ==
- 2017 WALL
- 2014 THE PORTRAIT OF SAKIP SABANCI
- 2011 fiction [jarse]
- 2011 fiction [forever]
- 2011 MESOPOTAMIAN DRAMATURGIES / MAYHEM
- 2010 BEGGARS
- 2009 SU
- 2009 MESOPOTAMIAN DRAMATURGIES / COLUMN
- 2009 MESOPOTAMIAN DRAMATURGIES / DOME
- 2009 MESOPOTAMIAN DRAMATURGIES / ENGLISH AS A SECOND LANGUAGE
- 2009 MESOPOTAMIAN DRAMATURGIES / FRAME
- 2009 MESOPOTAMIAN DRAMATURGIES / JOURNEY TO THE MOON
- (Installation)
- 2009 MESOPOTAMIAN DRAMATURGIES / PURSUIT OF HAPPINESS
- 2009 MESOPOTAMIAN DRAMATURGIES / STRANGE SPACE
- 2009 MESOPOTAMIAN DRAMATURGIES / THE COMPLETE WORKS OF WILLIAM SHAKESPEARE
- 2009 FFF
- 2007 TURKISH DELIGHT
- 2007 DOUBLE ROASTED
- 2007 CIRCLE OF FRIENDS
- 2006 PARADISE
- 2006 TESTIMONY
- 2004 STEFAN’S ROOM
- 2004 KÜBA
- 2004 TWELVE
- 2003 ANIMATED WORDS
- 2002 IT’S A VICIOUS CIRCLE
- 2002 1+1=1
- 2002 99 NAMES
- 2002 THE 4 SEASONS OF VERONICA READ
- 2001 NEVER MY SOUL
- 1999 MARTIN IS ASLEEP
- 1999 WOMEN WHO WEAR WIGS
- 1997 KUTLUG ATAMAN’S SEMIHA B. UNPLUGGED

== Filmography ==
Director:

- 2022: HILAL, FEZA AND OTHER PLANETS (Feature Film)
- 2014: THE LAMB (Feature Film)
- 2009: JOURNEY TO THE MOON (Feature Film)
- 2005: 2 GIRLS (Feature Film)
- 1999: LOLA+BİLİDİKİD (Feature Film)
- 1994: DARK WATERS (Feature Film)
- 1993: Karanlık Sular
- 1988: LA FUGA (Short Film)
- 1985: HANSEL AND GRETEL (Short Film)

Awards
Preceded by Uğur Yücel	Golden Orange Award for Best Director; 2005 for İki Genç Kız	Succeeded by Nuri Bilge Ceylan
