= Rekin Teksoy =

Rekin Teksoy (1928 – May 30, 2012) was a Turkish lawyer, author and translator.

== Career ==
Teksoy taught courses in Istanbul University’s Communications Faculty on Art of Cinema and Cinema and Literature Relations for over twenty years. He served on the executive board of Turkish Cinematech Association. He also published articles of film criticism in the 1960s and later became one of the founding members of Turkish Foundation of Cinema and Audiovisual Culture (TURSAK).

In 1994, Teksoy began to prepare and present the weekly cinema and literature program for Turkish Radio and Television 2 (TRT 2); the shows continued for 601 weeks. He was the chief editor of Arkin Cinema Encyclopedia and other publications. His play, "Rosa Luxemburg", was staged for two seasons at Ayna Theater - Dilek Turker in Istanbul’s Kucuk Sahne.

He has translated novels, stories and plays from writers such as Machiavelli, Italo Calvino, Cesare Pavese, Italo Svevo, Dino Buzzati, Pier Paolo Pasolini, Curzio Malaparte, Federico Fellini, Oriana Fallaci, Luigi Malerba, Dario Fo and Milan Kundera into the Turkish language.

He received The Avni Dilligil Award as the best translator for his translation of Carlo Goldoni’s Arlecchino Servitore di due Padroni (Turkish: Iki Efendinin Usagi). He was knighted as a chevalier by the Italian President for his unabridged translation of Boccaccio’s Decameron into Turkish. He was also awarded by the Italian Senate Committee of Senate Awards for the first in verse translation of Dante Alighieri’s The Divine Comedy into Turkish.

Rekin Teksoy’s Turkish Cinema, one of the first English language resources outlining the history of cinema in Turkey from the late Ottoman period to the present day, provides students and film enthusiasts outside the borders of Turkey a glimpse into that country’s film history. This book is an accumulation of material previously found in Rekin Teksoy’s Turkish Cinema (Rekin Teksoy’un Turk Sinemasi), published by Oglak Yayinevi in Turkish in 2007. Domestically he is also well known for his comprehensive work on world film history entitled Rekin Teksoy’s Cinema History (Rekin Teksoy’un Sinema Tarihi), published in 2005 by Oglak Yayinevi.

== Works ==
=== Books ===
- Turkish Cinema, (Translated by Martin Thomen, Ozde Celiktemel), Oglak Yayincilik, 2008.
- Rekin Teksoy’un Turk Sinemasi, Oglak Yayincilik, 2007.
- Rekin Teksoy'un Sinema Tarihi, Oglak Yayincilik, 2005.
- Rosa Luxemburg, Nisan Yayinlari, 1996.

=== Translations ===
- K. Marx & F.Engels, Manifest der Kommünistischen Partei - Komunist Parti Manifestosu, Oglak Yayincilik, 2005.
- Dante Alighieri, Divine Comedy - Ilahi Komedya, Oglak Yayincilik, 2003.
- Giovanni Boccaccio, Decameron, Oglak Yayincilik, 2000.
- Niccolò Machiavelli, Il Principe - Prens, Oglak Yayinlari, 1999.
- Oriana Fallaci, Insciallah - Insallah, Can Yayınları,1994.
- Federico Fellini, 8½, Nisan Yayınları, 1993.
- Dino Buzzati, La Boutique del Mistero - Tanrıyı Goren Kopek, Can Yayinlari, 1992.
- Luigi Malerba, Il protagonista - Babafingo, Can Yayinlari, 1992.
- Italo Calvino, Palomar, Can Yayinlari, 1991.
- Dino Buzzati, La Boutique del Mistero - Tanrıyı Goren Kopek, Can Yayinlari, 1992.
- Pier Paolo Pasolini, Teorema, Can Yayınları, 1992.
