= Güven Kıraç =

Turkish actor

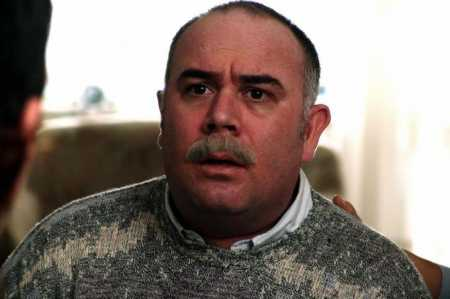
- Kıraç in 2004
- Born: 5 April 1960 (age 65); Istanbul, Turkey
- Occupation: Actor
- Spouses: Dürnev Kıraç (m. 1999; div. 2010) Başak Kıraç (m. 2010; div. 2022)
- Children: 1

Güven Kıraç (born 5 April 1960) is a Turkish actor. He won the IFFI Best Actor Award (Male) at the 41st International Film Festival of India.

== Biography ==
Kıraç was born on 5 April 1960 in Istanbul, Turkey. He studied theater at the conservatory of Mimar Sinan University.

He is of Abkhaz descent.

== Filmography ==
Film
Year	Title	Role	Notes
1997	Masumiyet	Yusuf	
1998	On Board	Aziz	
1999	Laleli'de Bir Azize	Aziz	
1999	Salkım Hanımın Taneleri	Bekir	
1999	Duruşma	Cavit	
2003	Abdülhamid Düşerken	Mehmed Cavid	
2004	Head-On	Şeref	
2004	Kebab Connection	Mehmet	
2004	Zor Adam		
2005	Gönül Yarası	Mehmet	
2005	The Net 2.0	Osman	
2005	Anlat İstanbul	Mimi	
2006	Hacivat Karagöz Neden Öldürüldü?	Pervane	
2006	Sınav	Rafet	
2006	Takva: A Man's Fear of God	Rauf	
2006	Babba		
2006	Tövbe		
2007	Yaşamın Kıyısında	Commissioner	
2007	Sünnet Davası	Cevat	
2009	Kirpi	Tahir Yaman	
2010	Kavşak	Güven	
2013	Özür Dilerim	Selim	
2016	Beginner	Faruk	
2018	Kafalar Karışık	Ümit	
2019	Organize İşler Sazan Sarmalı	İhsan	
Yakında	Derûn		

Television
Year	Title	Role	Notes
1996	Hiç Bana Sordun mu?		
1997	Dostlar Pasajı		
1999	Evimiz Olacak mı?		
1997–2000	Akasya Pasajı		
2000	Hayat Bağları		
2000	Lazeryum		
2000	Melek Karım		
2001	Yeditepe İstanbul	Remzi	
2002	Merhaba New York		
2002	Vaka-i Zaptiye		
2004	Canım Benim		
2006	Gönül	Lütfü	
2008–2011	Sen Harikasın		
2010–2012	Behzat Ç. Bir Ankara Polisiyesi	Memduh Başgan	
2013–2014	Beni Böyle Sev	Nail Keskin	
2016	Familya	Casim Yeltekli	
2018	Dudullu Postası	Asım	
2018–2020	Payitaht: Abdülhamid	Vambery	
2020	Hekimoğlu	Vahap	
2020–2021	Tövbeler Olsun	Namzet Horanta	
2024–	İnci Taneleri		

Web
Year	Title	Role	Notes
2019	Behzat Ç. Bir Ankara Polisiyesi	Memduh Başgan	
2022–	Çekiç ve Gül: Bir Behzat Ç. Hikayesi	Memduh Başgan	
