= Antalya Golden Orange Film Festival =

Annual film festival held in Antalya, Turkey

Coordinates: 41.03664°N 28.98779°E

Antalya Film Festival
- 50th International Antalya Golden Orange Film Festival logo, October 2013.
- Location: Antalya, Turkey
- Founded: 1963
- Awards: Golden Orange
- Language: Turkish
- Website: www.antalyaff.com/en/

The Antalya Golden Orange Film Festival (Turkish: Antalya Altın Portakal Film Festivali), known for a few years from 2015 as Antalya International Film Festival, is the oldest film festival in Turkey, and held annually in Antalya since 1963. The event, which takes place in the autumn months at the Antalya Cultural Center (Antalya Kültür Merkezi, AKM), has been organised solely by the Antalya Foundation for Culture and Arts (Antalya Kültür Sanat Vakfı, AKSAV) since 2009 and has included an international section within the main body of the festival.

== History ==
Cultural activities like concerts and theatre plays, which started to take place in the 1950s at the historical Aspendos Amphitheatre, formed the cornerstone of the Antalya Golden Orange Film Festival of today. These events held in the summer months under the honorary patronage of Avni Tolunay, found ever increasing interest from people and became traditional at the beginning of the 1960s. In 1963, the festivities turned into a film festival with the initiation Avni Tolunay, who became the mayor of Antalya that year. As the logo of the film festival, an orange was chosen as the most important symbol of the region, along with the sea, historical elements, and the Venus statue. The orange becomes not only a figure within the logo but also gives the festival its name.

The 1st Golden Orange Film Festival was held in 1964. Its mission was formulated by Avni Tolunay as to promote the Turkish cinema, to motivate Turkish film producers for high quality works and to help Turkish cinema penetrate the international film platform. The Golden Orange Feature Film Award was called soon the Turkish Oscar following the enthusiasm created in the cinema world with its high performance within a short time. In 1978, the festival went international by incorporating plastic arts for the first time.

Until 1985, the Golden Orange Festival was organized by the patronage of the Municipality of Antalya. That year, the organization was taken over by the newly established Foundation for Culture, Arts and Tourism in Antalya (Antalya Kültür Sanat Turizm Vakfı, AKSAV). From 1985 until 1988, the incorporation of an international music festival called "Akdeniz Akdeniz" ("Mediterranean Mediterranean") added another dimension to the festival. In the years 1989 to 1994, the municipality, tourism companies and the chamber of commerce in Antalya performed the organization of the Golden Orange Film Festival jointly. Finally, the festival became institutional with the establishment of the Foundation of Golden Orange Culture and Arts Foundation. The institution serves under the name Antalya Culture and Arts Foundation (Antalya Kültür Sanat Vakfı) since September 2002.

From 2005 to 2008 it was jointly organized with Turkish Foundation of Cinema and Audio-visual Culture (TURSAK) and was accompanied by the International Eurasia Film Festival: the 1st International Eurasia Film Festival; 2nd International Eurasia Film Festival; 3rd International Eurasia Film Festival; and the final 4th International Eurasia Film Festival.

The festival was cancelled on September 29, 2023, due to intense government pressure.

== Jury ==
The international jury of the festival is formed by nine personalities from the world of cinema and culture, who may not be directly associated with the production or exploitation of a film in competition. A jury of seven professional cinema experts in each of the three film categories advise the main jury.

== Awards ==
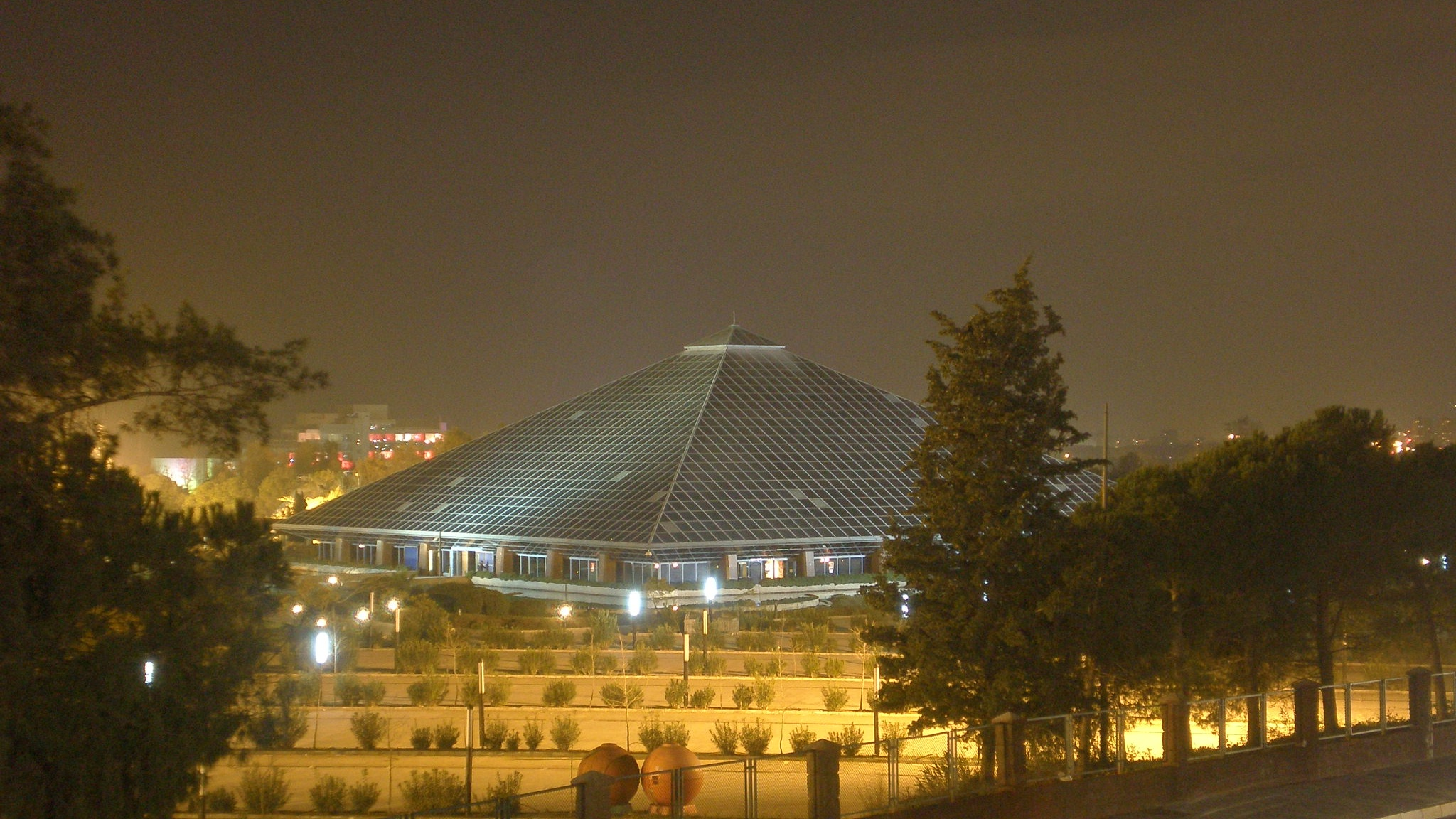
Glass Pyramid

The Golden Orange awards are given in three film categories. The statuette used before 2005 has been reinstated as of 2009.

=== National feature film competition ===
Money prizes are given in major categories and a Golden Orange statuette is awarded in addition in all of the following categories:

- Best Picture: 300,000 TRY (approx. US$140,000)
- Best Director: 30,000 TRY (US$14,000)
- Best Screenplay 20.000 TRY (US$9,000)
- Best Music 20.000 TRY (US$9,000)
- Best Actress
- Best Actor
- Best Camera Direction (in addition 100 rolls of film worth $30,000 granted by Kodak)
- Best Art Direction
- Best Supporting Actress
- Best Supporting Actor
- Best Cinematography
- Best Film Editing
- Best Makeup and Hairdress (since 2005)
- Best Visual Effects (since 2005)
- Best Costume Design
- Best Sound Design and Sound Mix (since 2005)

==== Jury special awards ====
- The Dr. Avni Tolunay Jury Special Award
- The Behlül Dal Digitürk Jury Special Award for Young Talent $25,000

=== National documentary film competition ===
- Best Picture: 7,000 TRY (approx. US$3.000) and the Golden Orange statuette

=== National short subject competition ===
- Best Picture: 7,500 TRY (approx. US$5,750)

== Venues ==
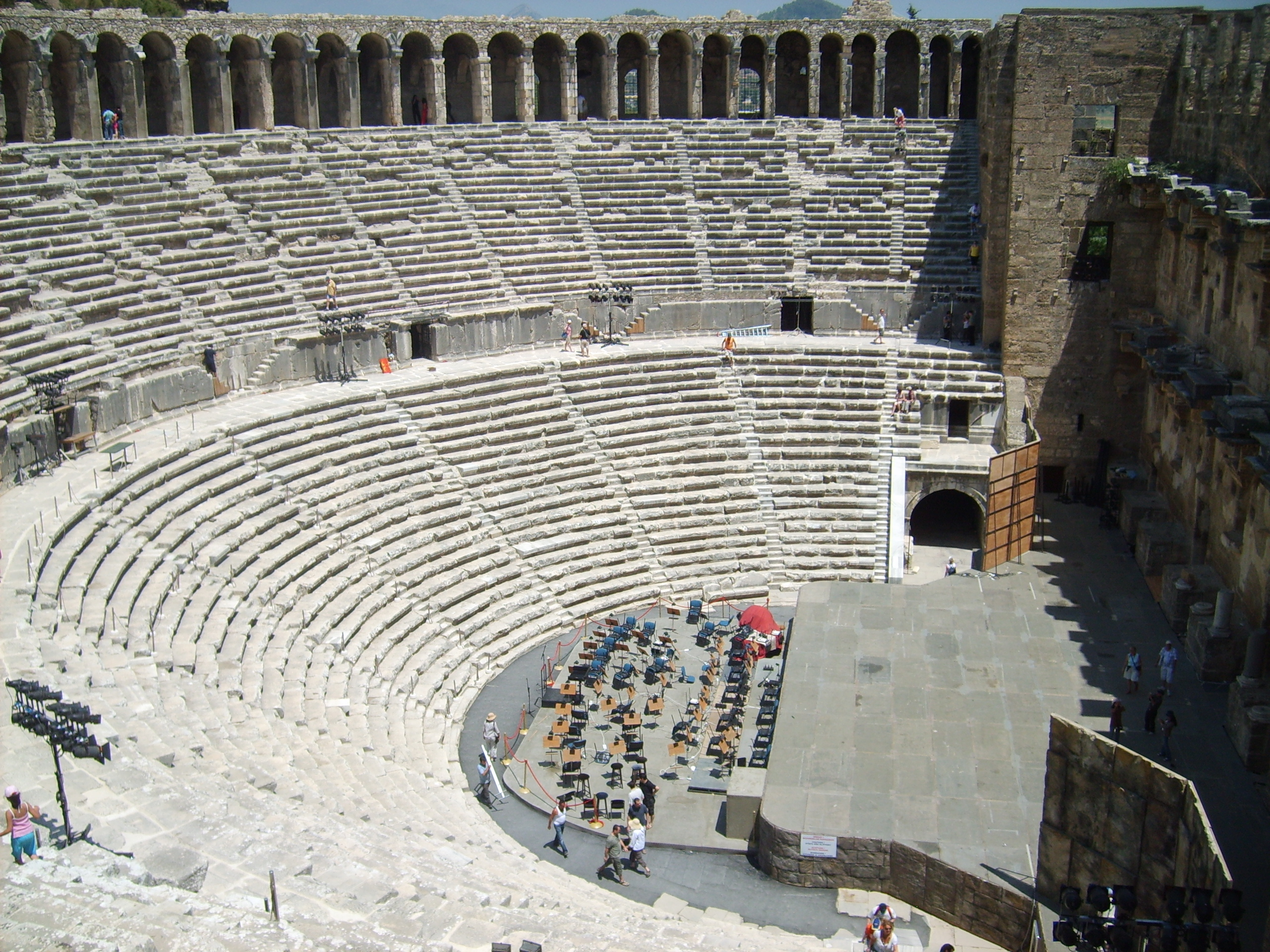
The ancient amphitheatre of Aspendos

The festival starts with a parade in the city of Antalya in the evening of the first day. The opening ceremony takes place at the Konyaaltı Amphitheatre or in Antalya Cultural Center in presence of the national and international film celebrities invited. At this ceremony, honorary awards are presented to cinema people for their contribution.

The award ceremony takes place on the closing night at the historical Aspendos Amphitheatre, which holds around 7,000 people. In case of bad weather conditions, the award ceremony is transferred to the Glass Pyramid Sabancı Congress and Exhibition Center, which provides seating for an audience of 2,500 only.

== Censorship in 2014 ==
During the 51st Golden Orange Festival in 2014, which was organized by Justice and Development Party (Turkey)'s municipality, when The Lamb directed by Kutluğ Ataman swept the board, Reyan Tuvi's feature-length documentary on the 2013-2014 Gezi protests, titled Yeryüzü Aşkın Yüzü Oluncaya Dek (Until The Earth's Face Becomes Love's Face), was removed from the festival with the claim that the documentary violated articles 125 and 299 of the Turkish Penal Code.

As an initial response, the jury of the Festival released a press statement protesting the decision. In the statement, the jury called out the action as a censorship effort by the administration and stated that the festival administration refused to reinstate the documentary despite their written protests.

On October 5, 2014, the chair of the Festival jury informed the press of his decision to resign from the jury for ethical reasons. The following day, 10 more jury members resigned from the Festival, informing the press that they were in solidarity with Reyan Tuvi, that they respected his right to an audience, that they protested the Festival administration's behavior of taking on the role of the judiciary branch, and that they were concerned about the administration's attempts to normalize censorship.

Again on October 5, Reyhan Tuvi tweeted that, because she decided to "remove a specific curseword from the English captions" (but not from the Turkish audio), the documentary will now be shown in the Festival as it was shown to audiences in Istanbul and elsewhere.

== See also ==
- Cinema of Turkey
- Turkish television drama
- World cinema
