= List of Turkish films of 2016 =

A list of films produced by the Turkish film industry in Turkey in 2016.

== Released films ==
=== January to March ===
Opened		Title	Director	Cast	Genre	Notes	Refs
J A N	1	Baskın: Karabasan	Can Evrenol	Muharrem Bayrak; Ergun Kuyucu; Sabahattin Yakut; Görkem Kasal; Fatih Dokgöz	Horror	-	
J A N	1	Hep Yek	Ali Yorgancıoğlu	Fırat Tanış; Gürkan Uygun; İnan Ulaş Torun; Gökhan Yıkılkan; Tuna Orhan	Comedy	-	
J A N	1	Kocan Kadar Konuş: Diriliş (Kocan Kadar Konuş 2)	Kıvanç Baruönü	Ezgi Mola; Murat Yıldırım; Hümeyra Akbay; Nevra Serezli; Eda Ece	Comedy	Sequel to Kocan Kadar Konuş.	
J A N	15	Bizans Oyunları (Geym of Bizans)	Gani Müjde	Tolgahan Sayışman; Tuvana Türkay; Gürkan Uygun; Ünal Yeter; Gonca Vuslateri	Comedy	-	
J A N	15	Kardeşim Benim	Mert Baykal	Burak Özçivit; Aslı Enver; Murat Boz	Drama	-	
J A N	22	Dedemin Fişi	-	Doğa Rutkay; Onur Buldu; Özlem Tokaslan; Ayşen Gruda; Ayşegül Akdemir	Comedy	-	
J A N	22	İftarlık Gazoz	Yüksel Aksu	Cem Yılmaz (Konuk oyuncu); Berat Efe Parlar	Comedy	-	
J A N	22	Köstebekgiller 2: Gölgenin Tılsımı	Kudret Sabancı; James Bobin	Janset Paçal; İnci Türkay; Ayla Algan; Reyhan Asena Keskinci; Ali Nuri Türkoğlu	Family-Animation	-	
J A N	29	Her Şey Aşktan (Her Şey Aşk İçin)	Andaç Haznedaroğlu	Hande Doğandemir; Şükrü Özyıldız; Mithat Can Özer; Özcan Deniz; Hakan Meriçliler	Romance	-	
F E B	5	Kötü Kedi Şerafettin	Ayşe Ünal; Mehmet Kurtuluş	Demet Evgar; Okan Yalabık; Uğur Yücel; Ayşen Gruda; Ahmet Mümtaz Taylan	Animated Action comedy	-	
F E B	12	Dünyanın En Güzel Kokusu (Dünyanın En Güzel Gülüşü)	Mustafa Uğur Yağcıoğlu	Rıza Kocaoğlu; Tuba Ünsal; Burak Altay; Açelya Akkoyun; Esra Ruşan	Comedy; Romance	Filmed in Istanbul & Amsterdam.	
F E B	12	Hesapta Aşk	Gönenç Uyanık	Burak Tozkoparan; Meriç Aral; Neriman Derya Şensoy; Fırat Altunmeşe; Kutay Kalabalık	Romance	-	
F E B	19	Osman Pazarlama	Togan Gökbakar	Şahan Gökbakar; Demet Akalın	Comedy	-	
F E B	21	Kedi	Ceyda Torun	Bülent Üstün	Documentary	Movie about the street cats of Istanbul	
F E B	26	The Scriptwriter	Hulusi Orkun Eser	Mustafa Uzunyılmaz; Dilara Büyükbayraktar; Halis Bayraktaroğlu; Ebru Sarıtaş; Mehmet Asım Tuncay	Action-Mystery	-	
M A R	4	Kaçma Birader	Murat Kaman; Defne Deliormanlı	Zafer Algöz; Melek Baykal; Algı Eke; Necip Memili; Mehmet Cihan Ercan	Comedy	-	
M A R	18	Şeytan Tüyü	M. Murat Şenöy	Mustafa Üstündağ; Şükran Ovalı; Güven Kıraç; Beyti Engin; Erdal Tosun	Comedy	-	
M A R	18	Türk Lokumu	Deniz Denizciler	Metin Yıldız; Oya Aydoğan; Mustafa Topaloğlu; Alper Rende	Comedy	-	
M A R	25	Azazil 2: Büyü	Mustafa Özen	Sertan Erkaçan; Tuğçe Kurşunoğlu; Ayça Kuru; Murat Ercanlı; Bedia Ener	Horror-Drama	Sequel to Azazil: Düğüm.	
M A R	25	Emicem Hospital	İsmet Eraydın	Wilma Elles; Sinan Bengier; Ali Erkazan; Merve Akaydın; Selahattin Çakır	Comedy	-	
M A R	25	Leblebi Tozu	Hakan Eser	Metin Yıldız; Erdal Cindoruk; Cengiz Okuyucu; Fulden Akyürek; Ferdi Kurtuldu	Comedy	-	

== See also ==
- 2016 in Turkey
