= List of Turkish films of 2013 =

== 2013 ==
Title	Director	Cast	Genre	Notes
Ask Kırmızı	Osman Sinav	Nurgül Yeşilçay, Tayanç Ayaydin, Ezgi Asaroglu	Romance	IMDB
Gallipoli: End of the Road	Serdar Akar	Gürkan Uygun, Berrak Tüzünataç, Umut Kurt	Drama	IMDB
Eve Dönüş: Sarıkamış 1915	Alphan Eseli	Uğur Polat, Nergis Öztürk, Serdar Orçin, Myraslava Kostyeva	Drama, Historical	IMDB
Gelmeyen Bahar	Emrah Erdoğan	Orhan Alkaya, Gürkan Tavukçuoglu, Ayse Kökçü	Drama	IMDB
Hititya: Madalyonun Sırrı	Cengiz Deveci, Ulaş Cihan Şimşek	Gürkan Uygun, Emir Berke Zincidi, Bruno Eyron	Adventure	IMDB
Kelebeğin Rüyası	Yılmaz Erdoğan	Kıvanç Tatlıtuğ, Belçim Bilgin, Mert Fırat, Farah Zeynep Abdullah, Yılmaz Erdoğan, Ahmet Mümtaz Taylan	Drama	IMDB
Taş Mektep	Altan Dönmez	Orhan Kılıç, Ayça Varlıer	Drama	IMDB
Romantik Komedi 2: Bekarlığa Veda	Erol Özlevi	Sedef Avcı, Sinem Kobal, Engin Altan Düzyatan, Cemal Hünal	Comedy	IMDB
Mutlu Aile Defteri	Nihat Durak	Tuncel Kurtiz, İlker Aksum	Comedy, Drama	IMDB
Hükümet Kadın	Sermiyan Midyat	Demet Akbağ, Sermiyan Midyat	Comedy	IMDB
G.D.O. Karakedi	Murat Aslan	Şafak Sezer, Serkan Şengül, Melisa Aslı Pamuk, Seda Yıldız, Şener Kokkaya	Comedy, Action	IMDB
Celal ile Ceren	Togan Gökbakar	Şahan Gökbakar, Ezgi Mola	Comedy, Romance	IMDB
Karaoğlan	Kudret Sabancı	Özlem Yılmaz, Müge Boz	Comedy, History	IMDB
Yozgat Blues	Mahmut Fazıl Coşkun	Ercan Kesel	Comedy	IMDB
Are We OK?				
Köksüz	Deniz Akçay	Ahu Türkpençe, Lale Basar, Savas Alp Basar, Mert Bostanci, Hatice Lütfiye Dinçer,	Drama	IMDB
CM101MMXI Fundamentals	Murat Dündar	Cem Yilmaz	stand up comedy	IMDB
Mahmut ile Meryem	Mehmet Ada Öztekin	Aras Bulut İynemli, Eva Dedova, Fakhraddin Manafov, Melahat Abbasova,	Drama	IMDB
Atatürk'ün Fedaisi Topal Osman	Atilla Akarsu	Reha Beyoglu, Izzet Çivril, Erdal Dalci	Drama, History	IMDB
Selam	Levent Demirkale	Bucin Abdullah, Selma Alispahic, Tina Cvitanovic,	Drama	IMDB
El-Cin	Hasan Karacadağ	Hakan Bozyiğit, Elif Erdal, Sevinç Erol, Serdal Genç, Alper Kadayıfçı	Horror	IMDB
Particle (film)	Erdem Tepegöz	Jale Arıkan, Rüçhan Caliskur, Özay Fecht, Remzi Pamukcu	drama film	IMDB
Umut Üzümleri	Tunç Okan	Yetkin Dikinciler, Ahmet Mekin, Barış Koçak, Altan Erkekli	Drama, Comedy	IMDB
Şimdiki Zaman	Belmin Söylemez	Sanem Öge, Şenay Aydın, Ozan Bilen	Drama	IMDB
Komik Bir Aşk Hikayesi	Cüneyt Yosulçay	Arzu Yanardağ, Seyhan Arman, Tuna Arman	Comedy, Romance	IMDB
God is not dead	Bahar Kılıç	Fun-Da-Mental, Kominas, and others	Documentary	IMDB

== See also ==
- 2013 in Turkey
