= List of highest-grossing films in Turkey =

The following lists represent the highest-grossing films in Turkey. This lists only accounts for the films' theatrical box office earning and not their ancillary revenues (i.e. home video rental and sales and television broadcast).

== Turkey's highest-grossing films ==
Background shading indicates films playing in the week commencing 13 November 2026 in Turkish theaters.

Rank	Title	Turkish lira	Year	Ref
1	Inside Out 2	408.483.087	2024	
2	Rafadan Tayfa 4: Hayrimatör	306.781.887	2023	
3	Lohusa	281.915.381	2024	
4	Deadpool & Wolverine	257.574.531	2024	
5	Kolpaçino 4 4'lük	242.322.318	2024	
6	Ölümlü Dünya 2	214.731.635	2023	
7	Oppenheimer	191.631.827	2023	
8	Avatar: The Way of Water	187.913.490	2022	
9	Despicable Me 4	180.485.804	2024	
10	Atatürk 1881 - 1919 (1. Film)	178.514.709	2023	
11	Rafadan Tayfa Galaktik Tayfa	170.239.757	2023	
12	Moana 2	161.623.986	2024	
13	Bergen	160.057.802	2022	
14	Barbie	141.071.634	2023	
15	Fast X	137.029.377	2023	
16	Venom: The Last Dance	119.468.555	2024	
17	Kung Fu Panda 4	115.096.185	2024	
18	3391 Kilometre	113.910.002	2024	
19	Dune: Part Two	113.167.189	2024	
20	Siccin 7	101.896.138	2024	
21	Michael	101.271.633	2026	
22	Miracle in Cell No. 7	90.197.464	2019	
23	John Wick 4	89.082.399	2023	
24	Çakallarla Dans 7	88.793.616	2024	
25	Recep İvedik 5	85.986.157	2017	
26	Müslüm	84.601.438	2018	
27	Kral Şakir: Devler Uyandı	80.315.133	2024	
28	Gladiator II	77.553.404	2024	
29	Spider-Man: No Way Home	76.704.251	2021	
30	Kutsal Damacana 4	75.264.923	2023	
31	Atatürk 1881 - 1919 (2. Film)	74.927.961	2024	
32	Recep İvedik 4	72.103.217	2014	
33	Düğün Dernek 2: Sünnet	69.422.924	2015	
34	Joker: Folie à Deux	69.422.924	2024	
35	Düğün Dernek	68.917.965	2013	
36	Recep İvedik 6	67.720.450	2019	
37	Kingdom of the Planet of the Apes	67.114.591	2024	
38	Pırıl: Sayıların Gizemi	66.107.833	2024	
39	Ayla: The Daughter of War	66.055.256	2017	
40	Aile Arasında	64.556.712	2017	
41	Eltilerin Savaşı	63.432.055	2020	
42	Arif V 216	62.986.200	2018	
43	Doctor Strange in the Multiverse of Madness	59.457.089	2022	
44	Nefes: Yer Eksi İki	57.627.303	2023	
45	Puss in Boots: The Last Wish	56.423.043	2022	
46	Kardeş Takımı	56.159.032	2024	
47	Mutluyuz	55.929.287	2024	
48	Fetih 1453	55.744.699	2012	
49	Rafadan Tayfa: Göbeklitepe	55.735.111	2019	
50	Money Trap	54.842.530	2019	
51	Thor: Love and Thunder	53.833.184	2022	
52	Kesişme - İyi ki Varsın Eren	53.340.580	2022	
53	Aslan Hürkuş 3: Anka Adası	53.049.853	2023	
54	Spider-Man: Across the Spider-Verse	52.432.802	2023	
55	Çakallarla Dans 6	50.946.808	2022	
56	The Wild Robot	50.557.893	2024	
57	Mustafa	50.430.480	2024	
57	0000 Kilometre	50.357.316	2024	
59	Minions: The Rise of Gru	49.750.622	2022	
60	Meg 2: The Trench	47.709.568	2023	
61	Godzilla x Kong: The New Empire	46.187.990	2024	
62	İllegal Hayatlar	45.971.641	2023	
63	Avengers: Endgame	44.824.606	2019	
64	Ailecek Şaşkınız	44.688.478	2018	
65	Aslan Hürkuş: Görevimiz Gökbey	44.122.856	2022	
66	The Super Mario Bros. Movie	43.560.041	2023	
67	Bir Cumhuriyet Şarkısı	42.592.265	2024	
68	Zaferin Rengi	40.721.342	2024	
69	Dağ 2	40.694.699	2016	
70	Çok Aşk	40.596.415	2023	
71	The Miracle	39.418.944	2015	
72	About Dry Grasses	38.876.343	2023	
73	Murat Göğebakan: Kalbim Yaralı	38.553.092	2023	
74	Joker	38.503.096	2019	
75	CM101MMXI Fundamentals	37.298.938	2013	
76	Poor Things	36.696.812	2024	
77	The Batman	36.684.759	2022	
78	Eyyvah Eyvah 2	36.678.019	2011	
79	The Garfield Movie	35.494.705	2024	
80	Eyyvah Eyvah 3	35.022.168	2014	
81	Kaptan Pengu ve Arkadaşları 4: Buzuldaki Sır	34.745.830	2024	
82	Kral Şakir Korsanlar Diyarı	34.302.699	2019	
83	Bizim İçin Şampiyon	34.229.850	2018	
84	Recep İvedik 2	33.493.327	2009	
85	The Miracle 2: Love	32.890.719	2019	
86	Avatar	32.817.306	2009	
87	Mission: Impossible – Dead Reckoning Part One	32.576.254	2023	
88	Çalgı Çengi İkimiz	32.540.648	2017	
89	Gelin Takımı	32.465.835	2024	
90	Furious 7	32.132.000	2015	
91	The Fate of the Furious	31.761.048	2017	
92	Cep Herkülü: Naim Süleymanoğlu	31.744.207	2019	
93	Baba Parası	31.736.151	2020	
94	Five Minarets in New York	31.645.541	2010	
95	Wonka	31.431.126	2023	
96	Napoleon	31.304.123	2023	
97	Black Panther: Wakanda Forever	30.888.940	2022	
98	A.R.O.G	30.424.262	2008	
99	Black Adam	30.276.257	2022	
100	Recep İvedik	30.172.530	2008	

== Highest-grossing animated films ==
Background shading indicates films playing in the week commencing 13 November 2026 in Turkish theaters.

Rank	Title	Turkish lira	Year	Ref
1	Inside Out 2	408.483.087	2024	
2	Rafadan Tayfa 4: Hayrimatör	306.781.887	2023	
3	Despicable Me 4	180.485.804	2024	
4	Rafadan Tayfa Galaktik Tayfa	170.239.757	2023	
5	Moana 2	161.623.986	2024	
6	Kung Fu Panda 4	115.096.185	2024	
7	Kral Şakir: Devler Uyandı	80.315.133	2024	
8	Puss in Boots: The Last Wish	56.423.043	2022	
9	Rafadan Tayfa: Göbeklitepe	55.735.111	2019	
10	Aslan Hürkuş 3: Anka Adası	53.049.853	2023	
11	Spider-Man: Across the Spider-Verse	52.432.802	2023	
12	The Wild Robot	50.557.893	2024	
13	Mustafa	50.430.480	2024	
14	Minions: The Rise of Gru	49.750.622	2022	
15	Aslan Hürkuş: Görevimiz Gökbey	44.122.856	2022	

== Franchises and film series adjusted for inflation ==
This chart was compiled based on data from Box Office Mojo, by dividing the gross by the average ticket price to calculate an estimate of the total number of admissions.

Background shading indicates that at least one film in the series is playing in the week commencing 13 November 2026 in Turkish theaters.

Rank	Series	Total box office (TL)	No. of films	Average of films	Highest-grossing film

1
Marvel Cinematic Universe
812,783,448
34
23,905,396
Deadpool & Wolverine (199,065,397)

The Multiverse Saga
510,466,206
11
46,406,019
Deadpool & Wolverine (257,574,531)

	Phase Five	324,182,317	4	81,045,579	Deadpool & Wolverine (257,574,531)
1	Deadpool & Wolverine (2024)	257,574,531			
2	Guardians of the Galaxy Vol. 3 (2023)	27,912,668			
3	Ant-Man and the Wasp: Quantumania (2023)	22,105,469			
4	The Marvels (2023)	16,589,649			

	Phase Four	244,793,023	7	34,970,432	Spider-Man: No Way Home (76,704,251)
1	Spider-Man: No Way Home (2021)	76,704,251			
2	Doctor Strange in the Multiverse of Madness (2022)	59,457,089			
3	Thor: Love and Thunder (2022)	53,833,184			
4	Black Panther: Wakanda Forever (2022)	30,888,940			
5	Eternals (2021)	9,172,554			
6	Black Widow (2021)	8,723,859			
7	Shang-Chi and the Legend of the Ten Rings (2021)	6,013,146			

The Infinity Saga	244,050,837	23	10,610,906	Avengers: Endgame (44,824,606)
/ Phase Three / 178,672,301 / 11 / 16,242,936 / Avengers: Endgame (44,824,606); 1 / Avengers: Endgame (2019) / 44,824,606; 2 / Avengers: Infinity War (2017) / 27,311,663; 3 / Captain Marvel (2019) / 19,438,225; 4 / Spider-Man: Far From Home (2019) / 17,351,420; 5 / Captain America: Civil War (2016) / 14,760,714; 6 / Thor: Ragnarok (2017) / 11,437,088; 7 / Doctor Strange (2016) / 11,232,742; 8 / Black Panther (2018) / 10,662,657; 9 / Spider-Man: Homecoming (2017) / 9,150,038; 10 / Ant-Man and the Wasp (2018) / 7,135,932; 11 / Guardians of the Galaxy Vol. 2 (2017) / 5,367,216
/ Phase Two / 45,631,637 / 6 / 7,605,273 / Avengers: Age of Ultron (15,618,775); 1 / Avengers: Age of Ultron (2015) / 15,618,775; 2 / Iron Man 3 (2013) / 8,208,682; 3 / Thor: The Dark World (2013) / 7,528,083; 4 / Ant-Man (2015) / 5,118,752; 5 / Captain America: The Winter Soldier (2014) / 5,014,601; 6 / Guardians of the Galaxy (2014) / 4,142,744
/ Phase One / 19,746,899 / 6 / 3,291,150 / The Avengers (7,660,682); 1 / The Avengers (2012) / 7,660,682; 2 / Thor (2011) / 3,640,745; 3 / Iron Man 2 (2010) / 2,743,085; 4 / Iron Man (2008) / 2,087,956; 5 / Captain America: The First Avenger (2011) / 2,030,716; 6 / The Incredible Hulk (2008) / 1,583,715

2	Rafadan Tayfa	553,212,226	4	138,303,057	Rafadan Tayfa: Hayrimatör (306,781,887)
1	Rafadan Tayfa: Hayrimatör (2023)	306,781,887			
2	Rafadan Tayfa: Galaktik Tayfa (2023)	170,239,757			
3	Rafadan Tayfa: Göbeklitepe (2019)	55,735,111			
4	Rafadan Tayfa: Dehliz Macerası (2018)	20,455,471			

3	Spider-Man	358,183,645	14	25,584,546	The Last Dance (119,468,555)
/ Sony's Spider-Man Universe / 174,480,706 / 4 / 43,620,177 / Venom: The Last Dance (119,468,555); 1 / Venom: The Last Dance (2024) / 119,468,555; 2 / Venom: Let There Be Carnage (2021) / 15,348,819; 3 / Venom (2018) / 13,400,506; 4 / Kraven the Hunter (2024) / 10,158,733; 5 / Madame Web (2024) / 9,042,478; 6 / Morbius (2022) / 7,061,615
/ Marvel Cinematic Universe / 103,205,709 / 3 / 34,401,903 / No Way Home (76,704,251); 1 / No Way Home (2021) / 76,704,251; 2 / Far From Home (2019) / 17,351,420; 3 / Homecoming (2017) / 9,150,038
/ Spider-Verse / 55,124,209 / 2 / 27,562,105 / Across the Spider-Verse (52,432,802); 1 / Across the Spider-Verse (2023) / 52,432,802; 2 / Into the Spider-Verse (2018) / 2,691,407
/ Webb series / 13,005,837 / 2 / 6,502,919 / The Amazing Spider-Man 2 (7,663,076); 1 / The Amazing Spider-Man 2 (2014) / 7,663,076; 2 / The Amazing Spider-Man (2012) / 5,342,761
/ Raimi series / 12,367,184 / 3 / 4,122,395 / Spider-Man 3 (5,671,787); 1 / Spider-Man 3 (2007) / 5,671,787; 2 / Spider-Man 2 (2004) / 4,408,698; 3 / Spider-Man (2002) / 2,286,699

4	X-Men	330,834,290	14	23,631,021	Deadpool & Wolverine (257,574,531)
/ Deadpool series / 289,448,003 / 3 / 96,482,668 / Deadpool & Wolverine (257,574,531); 1 / Deadpool & Wolverine (2024) / 257,574,531; 2 / Deadpool 2 (2018) / 17,671,396; 3 / Deadpool (2016) / 14,202,076
/ Main series / 22,725,903 / 10 / 2,272,590 / Apocalypse (7,172,881); 1 / Apocalypse (2016) / 7,172,881; 2 / Dark Phoenix (2019) / 6,020,328; 3 / Days of Future Past (2014) / 4,110,216; 4 / First Class (2011) / 2,047,448; 5 / The Last Stand (2006) / 1,659,712; 6 / X2 (2003) / 1,137,356; 7 / X-Men (2000) / 577,962
/ Wolverine series / 18,113,860 / 3 / 6,037,953 / Logan (11,560,432); 1 / Logan (2017) / 11,560,432; 2 / The Wolverine (2013) / 5,121,513; 3 / Origins: Wolverine (2009) / 1,431,915
The New Mutants (2020) / 546,524

5	Recep İvedik	318,187,780	6	53,031,297	Recep İvedik 5 (85,986,157)
1	Recep İvedik 5 (2017)	85,986,157			
2	Recep İvedik 4 (2015)	72,103,217			
3	Recep İvedik 6 (2019)	67,720,450			
4	Recep İvedik 2 (2009)	33,493,327			
5	Recep İvedik (2008)	30,172,530			
6	Recep İvedik 3 (2010)	28,712,099			

6
The Fast and the Furious
272,962,206
11
24,814,746
Fast X (137,029,377)

	The Fast Saga	246,608,922	10	24,660,892	Fast X (137,029,377)
1	Fast X (2023)	137,029,377			
2	Furious 7 (2015)	32,132,000			
3	The Fate of the Furious (2017)	31,761,048			
4	F9 (2021)	22,181,752			
5	Fast & Furious 6 (2013)	11,225,845			
6	Fast Five (2011)	6,037,189			
7	Fast & Furious (2009)	3,172,155			
8	Tokyo Drift (2006)	1,606,101			
9	2 Fast 2 Furious (2003)	909,127			
10	The Fast and the Furious (2001)	554,328			

Hobbs & Shaw (2019)	26,353,284

7	Kolpaçino	269,026,239	6	44,837,707	Kolpaçino 4 4'lük (242,322,318)
1	Kolpaçino 4 4'lük (2024)	242,322,318			
2	Kolpaçino 3.Devre (2016)	16,490,847			
3	Kolpaçino: Bomba (2011)	6,559,712			
4	Kolpaçino (2009)	3,653,362			

8
Despicable Me
264,943,225
6
44,157,204
Despicable Me 4 (180,485,804)

	Main series	203,512,586	4	50,878,147	Despicable Me 4 (180,485,804)
1	Despicable Me 4 (2024)	180,485,804			
2	Despicable Me 3 (2017)	12,603,532			
3	Despicable Me 2 (2013)	8,252,085			
4	Despicable Me (2010)	2,171,165			

	Prequel series	61,430,639	2	30,715,320	Minions: The Rise of Gru (46,997,828)
1	Minions: The Rise of Gru (2022)	49,750,622			
2	Minions (2015)	11,680,017			

9	Avatar	220,730,796	2	110,365,398	The Way of Water (187,913,490)
1	The Way of Water (2022)	187,913,490			
2	Avatar (2009)	32,817,306			

10	Çakallarla Dans	200,875,413	4	50,218,853	Çakallarla Dans 7 (88,793,616)
1	Çakallarla Dans 7 (2024)	88,793,616			
2	Çakallarla Dans 6 (2022)	50,946,808			
3	Çakallarla Dans 5 (2018)	18,121,196			
4	Çakallarla Dans 3: Sıfır Sıkıntı (2014)	17,213,319			
5	Çakallarla Dans 4 (2016)	15,202,299			
6	Çakallarla Dans 2: Hastasıyız Dede (2012)	8,576,507			
7	Çakallarla Dans (2010)	2,021,668			

11	DC Extended Universe	176,175,958	15	11,745,064	Black Adam (30,276,257)
1	Black Adam (2022)	30,276,257			
2	Aquaman and the Lost Kingdom (2023)	30,088,021			
3	Batman v Superman: Dawn of Justice (2016)	19,433,719			
4	Aquaman (2018)	17,398,996			
5	The Flash (2023)	17,236,449			
6	Suicide Squad (2016)	12,002,722			
7	Justice League (2017)	10,715,292			
8	Shazam! Fury of the Gods (2023)	7,410,294			
9	Wonder Woman (2017)	6,181,169			
10	Birds of Prey (2020)	6,116,083			
11	Blue Beetle (2023)	6,009,517			
12	Shazam! (2019)	5,282,187			
13	The Suicide Squad (2021)	4,367,395			
14	Man of Steel (2013)	3,657,857			
15	Wonder Woman 1984 (2020)	0			

12	Siccin	131,581,234	7	18,797,319	Siccin 7 (101,896,138)
1	Siccin 7 (2024)	101,896,138			
2	Siccin 5 (2018)	7,547,432			
3	Siccin 6 (2019)	7,159,336			
4	Siccin 4 (2017)	5,638,713			
5	Siccin (2014)	3,476,088			
6	Siccin 3: Cürmü Aşk (2016)	2,980,134			
7	Siccin 2 (2015)	2,883,393			

13	Aslan Hürkuş	124,633,427	3	41,544,476	Aslan Hürkuş 3: Anka Adası (53,049,853)
1	Aslan Hürkuş 3: Anka Adası (2023)	53,049,853			
2	Aslan Hürkuş Görevimiz Gökbey (2023)	44,122,856			
3	Aslan Hürkuş Kayıp Elmas (2022)	27,460,718			

14	Kung Fu Panda	124,609,734	4	31,152,434	Kung Fu Panda 4 (115,096,185)
1	Kung Fu Panda 4 (2024)	115,096,185			
2	Kung Fu Panda 3 (2016)	4,195,631			
3	Kung Fu Panda 2 (2011)	3,771,566			
4	Kung Fu Panda (2008)	1,546,352			

15
Wizarding World
93,426,349
11
8,493,304
The Secrets of Dumbledore (16,820,580)

	Fantastic Beasts series	33,980,627	3	11,326,876	The Secrets of Dumbledore (16,891,691)
1	The Secrets of Dumbledore (2022)	16,891,691			
2	The Crimes of Grindelwald (2018)	9,394,398			
3	Where to Find Them (2016)	7,694,538			

	Harry Potter series	59,470,247	8	7,433,781	Deathly Hallows – Part 1 (9,123,607)
1	Deathly Hallows – Part 1 (2010)	9,123,607			
2	Deathly Hallows – Part 2 (2011)	9,088,437			
3	Order of the Phoenix (2007)	7,790,220			
4	Half-Blood Prince (2009)	7,760,980			
5	Chamber of Secrets (2002)	6,812,733			
6	Goblet of Fire (2005)	6,752,722			
7	Prisoner of Azkaban (2004)	6,592,815			
8	Sorcerer's Stone (2001)	5,548,733			

16	Kutsal Damacana	88,329,755	4	22,082,439	Kutsal Damacana 4 (242,320,518)
1	Kutsal Damacana 4 (2023)	75,264,923			
2	Kutsal Damacana 2: İtmen (2010)	6,845,747			
3	Kutsal Damacana (2007)	4,514,747			
4	Kutsal Damacana: Dracoola (2011)	1,704,338			

17	Middle-earth	79,251,874	6	13,208,646	The Hobbit: The Battle of the Five Armies (20,116,916)
/ The Hobbit / 47,164,529 / 3 / 15,721,510 / The Battle of the Five Armies (20,116,916); 1 / The Battle of the Five Armies (2014) / 20,116,916; 2 / The Desolation of Smaug (2013) / 14,572,407; 3 / An Unexpected Journey (2012) / 12,475,206
/ The Lord of the Rings / 27,392,199 / 3 / 9,130,733 / The Return of the King (10,158,762); 1 / The Return of the King (2003) / 10,158,762; 2 / The Two Towers (2002) / 8,896,949; 3 / The Fellowship of the Ring (2001) / 8,336,488
The Lord of the Rings: The War of the Rohirrim (2024) / 4,695,146

18
Shrek
77,917,017
6
12,986,170
Puss in Boots: The Last Wish (56,398,013)

	Spin-offs	63,671,278	2	31,835,639	Puss in Boots: The Last Wish (56,398,013)
1	Puss in Boots: The Last Wish (2022)	56,398,013			
2	Puss in Boots (2011)	7,273,265			

	Main films	14,245,739	4	3,561,435	Shrek Forever After (6,035,217)
1	Shrek Forever After (2010)	6,035,217			
2	Shrek the Third (2007)	4,883,103			
3	Shrek 2 (2004)	3,327,419			
4	Shrek (2001)	0			

19	Kaptan Pengu ve Arkadaşları	66,403,602	3	22,134,534	Kaptan Pengu ve Arkadaşları 4: Buzuldaki Sır (34,745,830)
1	Kaptan Pengu ve Arkadaşları 4: Buzuldaki Sır (2024)	34,745,830			
2	Kaptan Pengu ve Arkadaşları 3: Buz Mandası Efsanesi (2023)	18,261,106			
3	Kaptan Pengu ve Arkadaşları 2 (2021)	9,631,773			
4	Kaptan Pengu ve Arkadaşları: Mandalina'nın Günlüğü (2020)	3,764,893			

20	Transformers	64,445,191	7	9,206,456	Transformers: Rise of the Beasts (28,152,213)
1	Transformers: Rise of the Beasts (2023)	28,152,213			
2	Transformers: The Last Knight (2017)	9,882,490			
3	Transformers: Age of Extinction (2014)	8,452,821			
4	Transformers: Dark of the Moon (2011)	6,859,258			
5	Bumblebee (2018)	5,025,267			
6	Transformers (2007)	3,227,582			
7	Transformers: Revenge of the Fallen (2009)	2,845,560			

21	Valley of the Wolves	59,014,791	6	9,835,799	Valley of the Wolves: Iraq (27,434,893)
1	Valley of the Wolves: Iraq (2006)	27,434,893			
2	Valley of the Wolves: Palestine (2011)	17,293,396			
3	Valley of the Wolves: Homeland (2017)	7,373,649			
4	Valley of the Wolves: Gladio (2009)	6,912,853			

22	MonsterVerse	58,390,672	5	11,678,134	Godzilla x Kong: The New Empire (46,187,990)
1	Godzilla x Kong: The New Empire (2024)	46,187,990			
2	Kong: Skull Island (2017)	5,671,318			
3	Godzilla (2014)	3,657,857			
4	Godzilla: King of the Monsters (2019)	2,873,507			
5	Godzilla vs. Kong (2020)	0			

23	Ice Age	50,902,776	5	10,180,555	Continental Drift (18,551,768)
1	Continental Drift (2012)	18,551,768			
2	Collision Course (2016)	14,678,261			
3	Dawn of the Dinosaurs (2009)	11,448,379			
4	The Meltdown (2006)	6,224,368			
5	Ice Age (2002)	0			

24	The Conjuring Universe	33,911,195	8	4,238,899	The Nun II (16,999,200)
/ The Nun series / 20,415,707 / 2 / 10,207,854 / The Nun II (16,999,200); 1 / The Nun II (2023) / 16,999,200; 2 / The Nun (2018) / 3,416,507
/ Annabelle series / 9,212,992 / 3 / 3,070,997 / Comes Home (5,079,947); 1 / Comes Home (2019) / 5,079,947; 2 / Creation (2017) / 3,336,970; 3 / Annabelle (2014) / 796,075
/ Main series / 6,977,142 / 4 / 1,744,286 / The Devil Made Me Do It (3,087,229); 1 / The Devil Made Me Do It (2021) / 3,087,229; 2 / The Conjuring 2 (2016) / 2,073,026; 3 / The Conjuring (2013) / 1,816,887
The Curse of La Llorona (2018) / 1,598,089

25	Trolls	23,758,954	3	7,919,651	Trolls Band Together (19,122,366)
1	Trolls Band Together (2023)	19,122,366			
2	Trolls (2016)	3,943,916			
3	Trolls World Tour (2020)	692,672			

26	Scream	23,343,930	6	3,890,655	Scream VI (15,733,335)
1	Scream VI (2023)	15,733,335			
2	Scream (2022)	5,317,847			
3	Scream 4 (2011)	1,754,348			
4	Scream 3 (2000)	452,758			
5	Scream 2 (1997)	85,642			
6	Scream (1996)	0			

== See also ==
- List of Turkish films
- Cinema of Turkey
