= List of 2013 box office number-one films in Turkey =

This is a list of films which have placed number one at the weekly box office in Turkey during 2013. The weeks start on Fridays, and finish on Thursdays. The box-office number one is established in terms of tickets sold during the week.

== Box office number-one films ==
†	This implies the highest-grossing movie of the year.

#	Date	Film	Tickets sold	Notes
1	January 10, 2013	CM101MMXI Fundamentals	966,163	
2	January 17, 2013	CM101MMXI Fundamentals	959,955	
3	January 24, 2013	Celal ile Ceren	1,143,043	
4	January 31, 2013	Celal ile Ceren	803,226	
5	February 7, 2013	Hükümet Kadın	496,097	
6	February 14, 2013	Hükümet Kadın	350,003	
7	February 21, 2013	Romantik Komedi 2: Bekarlığa Veda	556,220	
8	February 28, 2013	Kelebeğin Rüyası	808,053	
9	March 7, 2013	Kelebeğin Rüyası	477,055	
10	March 14, 2013	Kelebeğin Rüyası	271,504	
11	March 21, 2013	Çanakkale: Yolun Sonu	263,217	
12	March 28, 2013	Çanakkale: Yolun Sonu	198,124	
13	April 4, 2013	Selam	521,346	
14	April 11, 2013	Selam	584,620	
15	April 18, 2013	Selam	393,673	
16	April 25, 2013	Selam	225,884	
17	May 2, 2013	Selam	122,795	
18	May 9, 2013	Iron Man 3	324,499	
19	May 16, 2013	Iron Man 3	175,750	
20	May 23, 2013	Iron Man 3	104,682	
21	May 30, 2013	Fast & Furious 6	445,840	Fast & Furious 6 had highest number-one week among foreign language (non-Turkish) films in 2013
22	June 6, 2013	Fast & Furious 6	242,144	
23	June 13, 2013	Fast & Furious 6	191,433	
24	June 20, 2013	Man of Steel	161,928	
25	June 27, 2013	World War Z	274,076	
26	July 4, 2013	World War Z	170,459	
27	July 11, 2013	The Lone Ranger	113,323	
28	July 18, 2013	World War Z	80,173	
29	July 25, 2013	Pacific Rim	87,628	
30	August 1, 2013	The Wolverine	175,704	
31	August 8, 2013	The Smurfs 2	278,338	
32	August 15, 2013	The Smurfs 2	274,223	
33	August 22, 2013	The Smurfs 2	172,603	
34	August 29, 2013	Planes	150,811	
35	September 5, 2013	Planes	100,855	
36	September 12, 2013	Planes	71,883	
37	September 19, 2013	Şeytan-ı Racim	58,276	
38	September 26, 2013	Şeytan-ı Racim	46,589	The second week of Şeytan-ı Racim had the lowest number-one week of 2013.
39	October 3, 2013	Runner Runner	52,118	Runner Runner had lowest number-one week among foreign language (non-Turkish) films in 2013
40	October 10, 2013	Despicable Me 2	158,554	
41	October 17, 2013	Despicable Me 2	205,698	
42	October 24, 2013	Despicable Me 2	149,444	
43	October 31, 2013	Benim Dünyam	451,283	
44	November 7, 2013	Benim Dünyam	317,533	
45	November 14, 2013	Hükümet Kadın 2	413,152	
46	November 21, 2013	Su ve Ateş	367,947	
47	November 28, 2013	The Hunger Games: Catching Fire	375,835	
48	December 5, 2013	The Hunger Games: Catching Fire	259,850	
49	December 12, 2013	Düğün Dernek †	1,088,455	
50	December 19, 2013	Düğün Dernek †	1,169,888	The second week of Düğün Dernek had the highest number-one week of 2013.
51	December 26, 2013	Düğün Dernek †	1,009,385	
52	January 2, 2014	Düğün Dernek †	805,170	

== Highest-grossing films ==
=== In-Year Release ===
Highest-grossing films of 2013 by In-year release
Rank	Title	Distributor	Domestic gross
1	Düğün Dernek	UIP	₺39.932.315
2.	Celal ile Ceren	Tiglon	₺26.600.914
3.	The Butterfly's Dream	UIP	₺20.846.440
4.	Selam	Warner Bros.	₺14.910.817
5.	Romantic Comedy 2: Farewell to Bachelorhood	Pin.	₺14.623.156
6.	Hükümet Kadın 2	UIP	₺14.390.287
7.	Benim Dünyam	UIP	₺13.845.888
8.	Hükümet Kadın	UIP	₺12.999.529
9.	The Hobbit: The Desolation of Smaug	Warner Bros.	₺12.676.055
10.	The Smurfs 2	Warner Bros.	₺11.504.278
