= List of Turkish films of 2014 =

The Turkish film industry produced over one hundred feature films in 2014. This article fully lists all non-pornographic films, including short films, that had a release date in that year and which were at least partly made by Turkey. It does not include films first released in previous years that had release dates in 2014.

== Major releases ==
Opening		Title	Cast and crew	Studio	Genre(s)	Ref.
F E B R U A R Y	7	The Lamb	Director: Kutluğ Ataman; Cast: Güven Kiraç		Drama	
F E B R U A R Y	16	Little Happiness	Director: Nihat Seven; Cast: Mehtap Anil		Drama	
F E B R U A R Y	28	Gulyabani	Director: Orçun Benli; Cast: Deniz Ugur, Ceyda Ateş, Melike Öcalan, Didem Balçın, Cüneyt Arkın, Perihan Savaş, Mustafa Üstündağ, Kenan Ece	UIP Turkey	Horror; Comedy	
A P R I L	1	Mandıra Filozofu	Director: Müfit Can Saçıntı; Cast: Rasim Öztekin, Müfit Can Saçıntı, Eser Eyüboğlu, Ayda Aksel		Comedy	
M A Y	16	Winter Sleep	Director: Nuri Bilge Ceylan; Cast: Haluk Bilginer, Demet Akbag, Melisa Sözen, Tamer Levent, Nejat Isler	New Wave Films	Drama	
A U G U S T	31	The Cut	Director: Fatih Akın; Cast: Tahar Rahim		Drama	
S E P T E M B E R	3	Sivas	Director: Kaan Müjdeci; Cast: Dogan Izci		Drama	
S E P T E M B E R	11	Fort Bliss	Director: Claudia Myers; Cast: Michelle Monaghan, Ron Livingston, Pablo Schreiber, Emmanuelle Chriqui, Dash Mihok	Yeniceri Produksiyon A.S.	Drama	
D E C E M B E R	26	The Water Diviner	Director: Russell Crowe; Cast: Russell Crowe, Olga Kurylenko, Jai Courtney, Cem Yılmaz, Yılmaz Erdoğan	Universal Studios	Historical; War; Drama	

Release date	Title	Cast and crew	Genre(s)	Ref
14 February	A Small September Affair	Directed by Kerem Deren Cast: Engin Akyürek, Farah Zeynep Abdullah, Ceren Moray, Onur Tuna, Serra Keskin, Ege Aydan, Ebru Aykaç	drama film	
13 November	Two Hearts as One	Directed by Hasan Kiraç Cast: Serkan Şenalp, Hande Soral, Yagmur Kasifoglu, Atılgan Gümüş, Sema Ceyrekbasi, Fikret Hakan.	drama film	
30 October	Whisper If I Forget	Directed by Çağan Irmak Cast:Farah Zeynep Abdullah, Mehmet Günsür, Kerem Bürsin, Hümeyra, Isil Yücesoy, Gözde Cigaci, Gürkan Uygun, Köksal Engür	drama film	
2 October	Coming Soon (2014 film)	Directed by Cem Yılmaz Cast: Cem Yılmaz, Tülin Özen, Ozan Güven, Özkan Uğur, Zafer Algöz, Çağlar Çorumlu, Ayşen Gruda.	comedy film	
18 April	Let's Sin	Directed by Onur Ünlü Cast: Serkan Keskin, Hazal Kaya, Öner Erkan, Osman Sonant, Büşra Pekin, Umut Kurt, Serdar Orçin.	action film	
1 January	Patron Mutlu Son Istiyor	Directed by Kivanç Baruönü Cast: Tolga Çevik, Ezgi Mola, Murat Basoglu, Erkan Can, Ersin Korkut	Comedy, Romance	
17 October	Incir Reçeli 2	Directed by Aytaç Agirlar Cast: Sezai Paracikoglu, Mehmet Selim Akgul, Can Dogan, Safak Pekdemir, Levent Salih Güleç, Tugba Sariünal, Melike Güner, Hakan Ilçin	Drama, Romance	
28 November	Hadi İnşallah	Directed by Ali Taner Baltaci Cast: Cezmi Baskin, Ali Beyat, Murat Boz, Senay Bozoklar, Ibrahim Coskun, Idil Dizdar, Büsra Pekin.	Comedy	
12 December	Fakat Müzeyyen Bu Derin Bir Tutku	Directed by Çigdem Vitrinel Cast: Erdal Besikçioglu, Sezin Akbasogullari, Erdinç Gülener, Ege Aydan	Drama, Romance	
14 March	Sadece Sen	Directed by Hakan Yonat Cast: Belçim Bilgin, Ibrahim Celikkol, Kerem Can, Necmi Yapici, Cezmi Baskin, Baris Arduç, Levent Sülün	Action, Drama, Romance	
February 21	Recep İvedik 4	Directed by Togan Gökbakar Cast: Şahan Gökbakar, Cem Korkmaz, Resit Kurt, Baris Bulut	comedy film	

== See also ==
- 2014 in film
- 2014 in Turkey
- Cinema of Turkey
- List of 2014 box office number-one films in Turkey
- List of Turkish submissions for the Academy Award for Best Foreign Language Film
