= Husband Factor: Resurrection =

- Directed by: Kıvanç Baruönü
- Written by: Şebnem Burcuoğlu
- Screenplay by: Kıvanç Baruönü; Şebnem Burcuoğlu
- Produced by: Necati Akpınar
- Starring: Ezgi Mola; Murat Yıldırım
- Release date: 1 January 2016
- Running time: 108 minutes
- Country: Turkey
- Language: Turkish
- Box office: ₺15 million

Husband Factor: Resurrection (Turkish: Kocan Kadar Konuş: Diriliş) is a 2016 Turkish comedy film directed by Kıvanç Baruönü. It was made as a sequel to the film Husband Factor. The film stars Ezgi Mola and Murat Yıldırım.

== Cast ==
- Ezgi Mola
- Murat Yıldırım
- Hümeyra
- Nevra Serezli
- Gülenay Kalkan
- Eda Ece
- Begüm Öner
- Gül Arıcı
- Muhammet Uzuner
- İsmail İncekara
- Nilgün Kasapbaşoğlu
- Meltem Özsavaş
- Hakan Salınmış
- Enis Arıkan
- Bora Akkaş
