= Gökbakar =

Gökbakar is a Turkish surname. Notable people with the surname include:

- Şahan Gökbakar (born 1980), Turkish comedian, actor, and producer
- Togan Gökbakar (born 1984), Turkish film director
