= List of 2014 box office number-one films in Turkey =

This is a list of films which have placed number one at the weekly box office in Turkey during 2014. The weeks start on Fridays, and finish on Thursdays. The box-office number one is established in terms of tickets sold during the week.

== Box office number-one films ==
†	This implies the highest-grossing movie of the year.

#	Date	Film	Tickets sold	Notes
1	January 9, 2014	Düğün Dernek	534,346	
2	January 16, 2014	Düğün Dernek	446,582	
3	January 23, 2014	Düğün Dernek	397,037	
4	January 30, 2014	Düğün Dernek	440,718	
5	February 6, 2014	Eyyvah Eyvah 3	1,551,548	
6	February 13, 2014	Eyyvah Eyvah 3	868,411	
7	February 20, 2014	Eyyvah Eyvah 3	499,240	
8	February 27, 2014	Recep İvedik 4 †	2,857,019	Recep İvedik 4 attracted over 1,6 mil viewers on the first weekend and broke Recep İvedik 2's audience record (1,2 mil) for the highest weekend debut in all times.
9	March 6, 2014	Recep İvedik 4 †	1,837,568	
10	March 13, 2014	Recep İvedik 4 †	996,303	
11	March 20, 2014	Recep İvedik 4 †	552,780	
12	March 27, 2014	Recep İvedik 4 †	323,875	
13	April 3, 2014	Recep İvedik 4 †	211,354	
14	April 10, 2014	Noah	425,548	Noah is the first non-Turkish language film to date to reach number one in 2014.
15	April 17, 2014	Noah	257,166	
16	April 24, 2014	Noah	184,656	
17	May 1, 2014	The Amazing Spider-Man 2	330,312	
18	May 8, 2014	The Amazing Spider-Man 2	140,978	
19	May 15, 2014	The Amazing Spider-Man 2	92,091	The third week of The Amazing Spider-Man 2 had the lowest number-one week in 2014.
20	May 22, 2014	Godzilla	129,332	
21	May 29, 2014	X-Men: Days of Future Past	197,327	
22	June 5, 2014	X-Men: Days of Future Past	147,652	
23	June 12, 2014	Edge of Tomorrow	179,546	
24	June 19, 2014	Edge of Tomorrow	101,203	
25	June 26, 2014	How to Train Your Dragon 2	113,702	
26	July 3, 2014	Transformers: Age of Extinction	300,939	
27	July 10, 2014	Transformers: Age of Extinction	171,624	
28	July 17, 2014	Dawn of the Planet of the Apes	196,148	
29	July 24, 2014	Dawn of the Planet of the Apes	138,622	
30	July 31, 2014	Hercules	175,522	
31	August 7, 2014	Guardians of the Galaxy	133,957	
32	August 14, 2014	Lucy	219,016	
33	August 21, 2014	The Expendables 3	266,967	
34	August 28, 2014	The Expendables 3	155,105	
35	September 4, 2014	Planes: Fire & Rescue	119,092	
36	September 11, 2014	Teenage Mutant Ninja Turtles	157,595	
37	September 18, 2014	Dabbe 5: Zehr-i Cin	240,649	
38	September 25, 2014	Dabbe 5: Zehr-i Cin	170,860	The second week of Dabbe 5: Zehr-i Cin had the lowest number-one week among Turkish language films in 2014
39	October 2, 2014	The Maze Runner	128,349	
40	October 9, 2014	Pek Yakında	947,614	
41	October 16, 2014	Pek Yakında	500,353	
42	October 23, 2014	İncir Reçeli 2	502,558	
43	October 30, 2014	İncir Reçeli 2	467,538	
44	November 6, 2014	Unutursam Fısılda	387,052	
45	November 13, 2014	Unutursam Fısılda	358,499	
46	November 20, 2014	Deliha	453,132	
47	November 27, 2014	Deliha	448,094	
48	December 4, 2014	Hadi İnşallah	401,474	
49	December 11, 2014	Çakallarla Dans 3: Sıfır Sıkıntı	629,004	
50	December 18, 2014	Çakallarla Dans 3: Sıfır Sıkıntı	403,113	
51	December 25, 2014	The Hobbit: The Battle of the Five Armies	690,184	The first week of The Hobbit: The Battle of the Five Armies had the highest number-one week among foreign (non-Turkish) language films in 2014
52	January 1, 2015	The Water Diviner	512,384	

== Highest-grossing films ==
=== In-Year Release ===
Highest-grossing films of 2014 by In-year release
Rank	Title	Distributor	Domestic gross
1	Recep İvedik 4	Tiglon	₺72.103.217
2.	Eyyvah Eyvah 3	UIP	₺35.022.168
3.	Coming Soon	Warner Bros.	₺21.850.253
4.	Husband Factor	UIP	₺18.685.530
5.	Whisper If I Forget	CGV Mars	₺16.883.440
6.	Deliha	UIP	₺16.759.009
7.	The Hobbit: The Battle of the Five Armies	Warner Bros.	₺15.484.777
8.	Çakallarla Dans 3: Sıfır Sıkıntı	CGV Mars	₺15.104.893
9.	İncir Reçeli	UIP	₺14.586.685
10.	Noah	UIP	₺13.663.068
