= Recep İvedik 7 =

- Directed by: Togan Gökbakar
- Written by: Togan Gökbakar; Şahan Gökbakar
- Produced by: Şahan Gökbakar; Togan Gökbakar; Çağrı Özeren
- Starring: Şahan Gökbakar; Öznur Serçeler; Nurullah Çelebi
- Cinematography: Gerard Simon
- Edited by: Ersin Eker
- Music by: Jingle Jungle; Ömer Özgür; Umut Günel
- Production company: Cielo Medya
- Distributed by: Disney+
- Release date: 9 December 2022
- Running time: 133 minutes
- Country: Turkey
- Language: Turkish

Recep İvedik 7 is a 2022 Turkish comedy film directed by Togan Gökbakar and co-written with Şahan Gökbakar. It is the seventh installment in the Recep İvedik film series and stars Şahan Gökbakar reprising his role as the titular character, alongside Öznur Serçeler and Nurullah Çelebi.

== Plot ==
Recep İvedik, struggling with rising living costs in Istanbul, decides to leave the city and move into a house inherited from his grandmother in a rural village. Accompanied by his loyal friend Nurullah, Recep arrives in the village and soon learns that a large-scale development project is planned for the area. Outraged, Recep takes it upon himself to oppose the project. With the help of Nurullah and his new neighbor, lawyer Büşra Altın, Recep rallies the villagers to resist the development plans. Recep inadvertently becomes the leader of the resistance, ultimately finding a way to thwart the project and protect the village's way of life.

== Cast ==
- Şahan Gökbakar as Recep İvedik
- Öznur Serçeler as Lawyer Büşra Altın
- Nurullah Çelebi as Nurullah Sağlam
- Eray Türk as Teacher Kemal
- İrfan Kangı as Erdem Çökelek
- Murat Ergür as Headman Asım Civan
- Murat Dalkılıç as Himself
- Mehmet İlhami Adsal as Enver Çökelek
- Yeşim Sarı as Murat Dalkılıç's manager
- Turgut Çalhan as Salih Brother
- Fatih Batı as Martı Bıyık Fatih
- Barış Ali Çeliker as Bilya Cemal
- Gönen Fatih Yemez as Jan Klod Adnan
- Murat Bölücek as Biberli Hasan
- Şahabettin Karabulut as Zıp Zıp Orhan
- Cennet Uğurlu as Baltalı Sultan
