= Olgun Toker =

Turkish actor

- Born: 12 March 1986 (age 40); Mersin, Turkey
- Education: Müjdat Gezen Art Center
- Occupation: Actor
- Years active: 2010–present

Olgun Toker (born 12 March 1986) is a Turkish actor.

== Life and career ==
Toker was born on 12 March 1986 in Mersin. He studied theatre at the Müjdat Gezen Art Center. He made his debut in 2010 with a role in the movie Saklı Hayatlar and continued his cinematic career with Kurtuluş Son Durak, Hükümet Kadın and Küçük Esnaf.

Toker started his television career in 2012 by appearing in the series Son. He then had recurring roles in Benim Adım Gültepe, Karadayı, Şeref Meselesi and Hayat Şarkısı. His breakthrough came with his role in the 2019 Fox series Bir Aile Hikayesi as Mahur. In 2020, he was cast in a leading role in the drama series Arıza. In 2023 portraying the character Karategin in the TRT 1 historical series Kudüs Fatihi Selahaddin Eyyubi, was released on November 13, 2023.

== Filmography ==
=== Film ===
Year	Title	Role	Notes
2011	Saklı Hayatlar	Can	Supporting role
2011	Aşk ve Devrim	Mehmet Ünal	Supporting role
2012	Kurtuluş Son Durak	thief	Supporting role
2012	Bir Ses Böler Geceyi	Zülfü	Supporting role
2013	Hükümet Kadın	Adnan	Supporting role
2013	Düğün Dernek	hotel security	Guest
2014	Hükümet Kadın 2	Adnan	Supporting role
2015	Kir	Kopuk	Short film, leading role
2016	Küçük Esnaf	Oktay	Supporting role
2017	Benim Babam Bir Melek	Ümit	Leading role
2017	Dönüşüm	Mert/Yılmaz	Short film
2018	Yol Arkadaşım 2	Selim	Supporting role

=== Television ===
Year	Title	Role	Network	Notes
2010	Akasya Durağı	thief	Kanal D	Guest appearance (episode 89)
2010	Yaprak Dökümü	caregiver	Kanal D	Guest appearance
2012	Son	Taner	ATV	Supporting role
2012–2014	Karadayı	Melih Şadoğlu	ATV	Supporting role
2014	Benim Adım Gültepe	Reşat	Kanal D	Supporting role
2015	Şeref Meselesi	Seyhan Demir	Kanal D	Supporting role
2015	Tatlı Küçük Yalancılar	Güven	Star TV	Supporting role
2016–2017	Hayat Şarkısı	Mahir Duru	Kanal D	Supporting role
2017	Çember	Cumali Apaydın	Star TV	TV film, supporting role
2017–2018	Hayat Sırları	Kemal Kuzgun	Star TV	Leading role
2019	Bir Aile Hikayesi	Mahur Güneş	FOX	Leading role
2020	Güldür Güldür Show		Show TV	Guest appearance (episode 249)
2020–2021	Arıza	Burak Ersoylu	Show TV	Leading role
2021	Son Yaz	Gökhan Şen	FOX	Guest appearance
2022	Annenin Sırrıdır Çocuk	Çınar Yılmaz	TV8	Leading role
2022–2023	Güzel Günler	Atakan	Show TV	Leading role
2023–2025	Kudüs Fatihi Selahaddin Eyyubi	Karatekin	TRT 1	Leading role
2025	Sakıncalı	Faysal Tangören	NOW	Leading role
2026	Çirkin	Ferhat	Star TV	

=== Streaming films and series ===
Year	Title	Role	Network	Notes
2018	Dip	İsmail	puhutv	Series, supporting role
2021	Fatma	Sidar	Netflix	Series, supporting role
2022–	Mezarlık	Serdar Ata	Netflix	Film series, leading role
2023	Merve Kült		Netflix	Supporting role
