= Recep İvedik 3 =

- Film poster
- Directed by: Togan Gökbakar
- Written by: Serkan Altunigne; Sahan Gökbakar; Togan Gökbakar; Can Ali Sabuncu
- Produced by: Faruk Aksoy; Mehmet Soyarslan
- Starring: Şahan Gökbakar; Zeynep Çamci
- Cinematography: Ertunç Senkay
- Edited by: Erkan Ozekan
- Music by: Oguz Kaplangi
- Production company: Aksoy Film
- Distributed by: Özen Film
- Release date: February 12, 2010
- Country: Turkey
- Language: Turkish
- Box office: $22,588,876

Recep İvedik 3 is the sequel to Recep İvedik 2 and stars Şahan Gökbakar; it was released on February 12, 2010. Faruk Aksoy undertook the production of the film directed by Togan Gökbakar.

== Storyline ==
Recep Ivedik has been depressed since the death of his grandmother. Everyone who tries to help him fails. A young girl named Zeynep, who can't find an apartment, stays with Recep. Initially, the two can't stand each others but after a while, they grow close. Despite many adventures together, Recep's depression won't go away.

== Cast ==
- Şahan Gökbakar as Recep İvedik
- Zeynep Çamcı as Zeynep
