= Rafadan Tayfa =

- Genre: Adventure; Comedy
- Written by: Ozan Çivit
- Directed by: İsmail Fidan
- Voices of: Hakan Coşar; Zeynep Şirin Giobbi; Yağmur Sergen; Levent Kol; Emine Sergen Kazbek; Seçil Akıncılar
- Theme music composer: Tarkan Ergün
- Country of origin: Turkey
- Original language: Turkish
- No. of seasons: 10
- No. of episodes: 127

Production
- Running time: 15 minutes
- Production company: ISF Studios

Original release
- Network: TRT Çocuk
- Release: December 1, 2014 – present

Rafadan Tayfa is a Turkish animated children's television series directed by İsmail Fidan and written by Ozan Çivit. First aired in 2014, the series centers around a group of six children in Istanbul learning new things. Production takes place in Ankara and is done by ISF Studios. Work on the show started approximately in 2012, with the aim of portraying the Turkish mahalle culture of the 1980s and 1990s. Several spin-offs and three featured films related to the series have also been produced. Both the series and movies are generally well-liked by children.

== Premise ==
In a neighbourhood in Istanbul, Turkey, a group of six children who call themselves "Rafadan Tayfa" experience adventures to learn new things and resolve conflicts within the group and with other residents of the neighbourhood.

== Cast and characters ==
- Hakan Coşar as Mert, regarded as the leader of the group.
- Zeynep Şirin Giobbi as Akın, the younger brother of Mert.
- Yağmur Sergen as Kâmil, son of the bakkal who helps to run the store.
- Levent Kol as Hayri, obese brother of Hale that likes food.
- Emine Sergen Kazbek as Hale, younger sister of Hayri.
- Seçil Akıncılar as Sevim, oldest in the group.

Mert, Akın, Kâmil and Hayri are the main characters featured in all episodes, while Hale and Sevim only appear in most. Other characters include Basri (Nusret Çetinel) the grumpy old man, Rüstem (Levent Kol) the köfte seller and Yumak, a dog taken care by Akın and Basri.

== Production ==
The director of Rafadan Tayfa is İsmail Fidan, while the writer is Ozan Civit. The series is produced by ISF Studios, an animation studio founded by Fidan. The series is aimed at children but also adults. Production of the series, as well as voicing, takes place in Gölbaşı, Ankara.

After receiving his master's degree in 2009 on public administration and politics, Fidan realized that the 1980s in Turkey were mostly remembered as coup years, and thought that many values of his childhood were forgotten. After discussing this with Civit, they decided to "combine the neighborhood culture and their childhood" for the project. Characters included in the series are ordinary people "one could meet on the street". Fidan was inspired by his close relatives when creating several of the characters. In early 2017, Fidan said that they had been working on the series "for five years".

The initial name chosen for the series was Yukarı Mahalle, meaning "Upper Neighbourhood". Fidan later decided to focus on a crew (tayfa). The name Rafadan Tayfa translates to "Soft-boiled Crew", which was due to the personality of the young characters not having settled in yet and since they make a lot mistakes and learn new things in the series.

=== Broadcast ===
The first episode of the series was broadcast on 1 December 2014. Six or nine episodes are aired on TRT Çocuk throughout the day. As of February 2023, the series has a total of 127 episodes. These are around 15 minutes long.

== Themes ==
The series portray the mahalle culture of the 1980s and 1990s. Helpfulness, solidarity, scientificity and sharing are the main themes observed in the episodes, covering similar topics as several other Turkish cartoons. An analysis of 15 episodes showed that the development and creativity of the characters are well covered in episodes, and that political and religious topics are avoided in the series. Other studies have found that playing games—football, tug of war, marbles—and gender equality are also frequently featured and that the creators focused more on universal values rather than national.

== Reception and viewership ==
In a 2018 study, over 50% of participating 6–8 year olds said that their favourite cartoon was Rafadan Tayfa. Another study that same year yielded similar results with the series being the most popular among first and third graders. According to a 2020 journal article in UEAD, a significant number of games shown in episodes advance psychomotor learning, thus finding the series "encouraging and motivational to children" to play these games.

Rafadan Tayfa reportedly broke viewership records on TRT Çocuk. Exact ratings of the series is not known as the viewership numbers of the channel have not been made public since 2017. Based on their "own study", the creators of the series claim that they have an audience aged between 2 and 60 years old.

== Other media ==
=== Spin-offs ===
Several spin-offs of the main series exist. Ramazan Tayfa is aired during the fasting month of Ramadan. In 2020, TRT started to broadcast Trafik Tayfa in cooperation with the Ministry of the Interior, which aims to teach traffic rules to kids at a young age. Later that same year, it was announced that a new series related to technology and the virtual world, Dijital Tayfa, would also be aired.

=== Featured movies ===
Three featured films related to Rafadan Tayfa have been created. In a 2021 interview, director Fidan said that they got a budget of $US1–2 million per movie.

Rafadan Tayfa: Dehliz Macerası in October 2018 was the first to be released. It was watched by approximately 500.000 people within the first week. The second movie, Rafadan Tayfa: Göbeklitepe, was released in December 2019. Production with a crew of 80 took 1,5 years to complete. Rafadan Tayfa: Galaktik Tayfa was released in January 2023 and watched by over a million people in less than two weeks. It grossed 165.072.275 Turkish lira, which made it the second highest-grossing film in Turkey. Rafadan Tayfa: Hayrimatör was released in December 2023.
