= Zeynep Çamcı =

Turkish actress (born 1986)

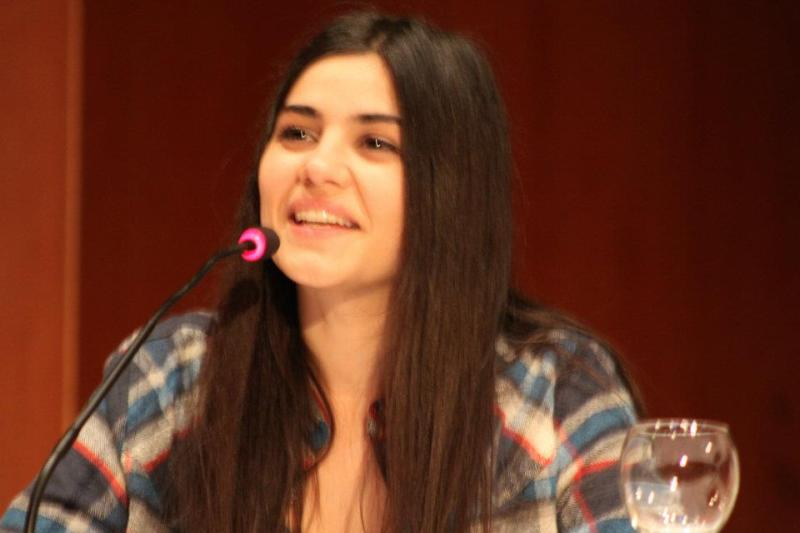
- Born: Zeynep Çamcı; December 11, 1986 (age 39); Bodrum, Turkey
- Education: Istanbul University
- Occupation: Actress
- Years active: 2009–present
- Spouse: Serhat Bayram
- Website: www.zeynepcamci.net

Zeynep Çamcı (born December 11, 1986) is a Turkish actress and screenwriter. She is best known for the hit surreal comedy series Leyla ile Mecnun and the popular youth series Beni Böyle Sev. She won the 2013 Best Actress Award at the International Antalya Film Festival for her role in the movie Meryem.

== Filmography ==
Film
Year	Title	Role	Notes
2008	Recep İvedik 2	Cashier	Supporting role
2009	Güneşin Karanlığı	Güneş	Short film
2009	Recep İvedik 3	Zeynep	Supporting role
2013	Meryem	Meryem	Leading role
2014	Deliha	Havva	Supporting role
2018	Gerçek Kesit: Manyak	-	Supporting role
2020	Feride	Feride	Leading role
2026	Trees Are Watching	Spin	
Television
Year	Title	Role	Notes
2009	Gece Gündüz	Aslı	Guest appearance
2011–2012	Leyla ile Mecnun	Sedef	Leading role
2012	Adını Feriha Koydum: Emir'in Yolu	Can Serter	Supporting role
2012	Canımın İçi	Sinem	Guest appearance
2013–2014	Beni Böyle Sev	Ayşem	Leading role
2015	Eğlendirme Dairesi	Zeynep	Leading role
2016–2017	Seviyor Sevmiyor	Deniz	Leading role
2017	Kara Yazı	Yaren	Leading role
2018	Adı: Zehra	Zehra Şimşek / Hande Kurdoğlu	Leading role
2022–2023	Güzel Günler	Altan	Leading role
Streaming series
Year	Title	Role	Notes
2021	Terapist	Ayşe	Leading role
2021	Adım Başı Kafe	Merve	Leading role
