= Cem Korkmaz =

Turkish actor and YouTuber (1987–2017)

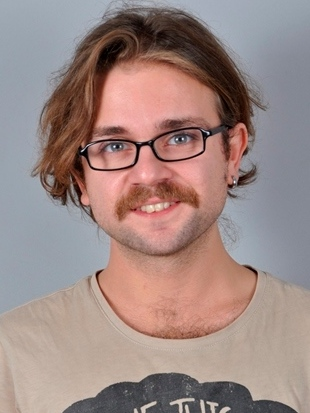
- Korkmaz in 2016
- Born: 1987; Bursa, Turkey
- Died: 1 November 2017 (aged 29–30); Üsküdar, Istanbul, Turkey
- Citizenship: Turkey

Cem Korkmaz (1987 – 1 November 2017) was a Turkish actor and YouTuber.

== Life ==
Cem Korkmaz was born in Bursa in 1987, the only child of his family. He completed his primary and secondary education there and finally entered the State Theatre of Bursa.

Korkmaz, who exhibited his acting with projects such as AROG (2008), Recep İvedik 4 (2014), Diğer Yarım (2014), Kiraz Mevsimi (2014) and Husband Factor (2015), made his real debut with his videos on a YouTube channel.

In 2013, he joined Mediakraft, which produces content for YouTube, and towards the end of 2015, his name started to be heard among internet users in Turkey. In February 2015, he was terminated by Mediakraft for swearing during a broadcast with his followers on Periscope, and in April 2015 he created a personal channel for himself.

=== Death ===
On 1 November 2017, he committed suicide in his house in Üsküdar, Istanbul for an unknown reason, without leaving a will behind. When his relatives, who had not heard from him for a long time, reported the situation, the door of his house was opened in the presence of a locksmith and the police and they saw that Korkmaz had hanged himself using a rope.
