= Fatma Toptaş =

Turkish actress

- Born: 25 November 1982 (age 42); Mersin, Turkey
- Occupation: Actress
- Years active: 2007–present

Fatma Toptaş (born 25 November 1982) is a Turkish actress.

== Life and career ==
Toptaş studied theatre and acting at the Müjdat Gezen Art Center. In 2007, she started her career by making guest appearances in the Kanal D series Bıçak Sırtı and the Show TV series Doktorlar. Her first leading role was in the 2008 comedy film Recep İvedik, in which she played Sibel opposite Şahan Gökbakar. In the same year, she was cast in another comedy movie, titled Avanak Kuzenler. She further rose to prominence with her roles in the TRT series Başrolde Aşk and the 2011 ATV series Hayat Devam Ediyor. In 2013, she played the role of Serpil in Cesur Hemşire, which was broadcast on ATV. The following year, she was cast in the FOX series Kiraz Mevsimi as Sibel and starred in No. 309 in 2016. In 2020, she had a leading role in the FOX romantic comedy Bay Yanlış, portraying the character of Cansu Akman.

== Filmography ==
Year	Title	Role	Notes
2007, 2008	Doktorlar (TV series)		Guest appearance
2007	Aşk Üzerine Bir Varsayım	Psychologist	
2007	Bıçak Sırtı (TV series)		Guest appearance
2007	Çok Özel Tim (TV series)	Burcu	
2008	Recep İvedik (Film)	Sibel	Leading role
2008	Avanak Kuzenler (Film)	Melike	
2010	Herkes mi Aldatır? (Film)	Canan	
2011	Başrolde Aşk (TV series)		
2011	Ya Sonra (Film)	Ece	
2011–2012	Hayat Devam Ediyor	Şebnem Yalaz	
2013	Cesur Hemşire (TV series)	Serpil	
2014	Gölgedekiler (TV series)	Rana	
2014–2015	Kiraz Mevsimi	Sibel Korkmaz	
2014	Vay Başıma Gelenler! 2 Buçuk	Rüya	
2016–2017	No 309 (TV series)	Nilüfer Yorulmaz	
2019	Annem (Film)	Nesrin	
2020	Bay Yanlış (TV series)	Cansu Akman	
2023	Özür Dilerim (Film)	Seyyal	
