= Inflame (film) =

2017 film

- Film poster
- Directed by: Ceylan Özgün Özçelik
- Written by: Ceylan Özgün Özçelik
- Starring: Algi Eke
- Release dates: 12 February 2017 (Berlin); 12 May 2017 (Turkey)
- Running time: 94 minutes
- Country: Turkey
- Language: Turkish

Inflame (Turkish: Kaygı) is a 2017 Turkish psychological thriller film directed by Ceylan Özgün Özçelik. It was screened in the Panorama section at the 67th Berlin International Film Festival.

== Cast ==
- Algı Eke as Hasret
- Özgür Çevik as Mehmet
