= Farbod Khoshtinat =

- Born: Farbod Khoshtinat; August 11, 1988 (age 38); Tehran, Iran
- Occupations: Director, editor, cinematographer
- Years active: 2002–present

Farbod Khoshtinat (Persian: فربد خوش‌طینت; born August 11, 1988) is an LA-based Iranian director, editor and cinematographer.

== Career ==
farbod is in high school student The Bureau of International Information Programs, United States Department of State has announced that Khoshtinat's short film, ATTN: Mr. Democrat, is the 2010 Democracy Video Challenge Winner for the Near East and North Africa. Jeff Baron, Staff Writer, America.gov, Washington reported that, "Khoshtinat said that his work on music videos and other underground, unauthorized short films led to an order by the Iranian government about a year ago that he stop making films. Instead, he said by e-mail, he moved to Malaysia to continue his studies. 'I am sure now that I cannot go back to Iran, but here I am safe and sound to work and publicize my art,' he said."

He has produced 20 feature films, some of which have premiered at festivals such as Sundance and Cannes including A Persian Affair, Love and Fear.

His award-winning short film about democracy in Iran has aired at the United Nations, the Directors Guild of America, and the Motion Picture Association of America, and was personally presented by US Secretary of State Hillary Clinton. Farbod Khoshtinat won the 7th Asian Film Awards for Best Visual Effects for Rhino Season. He has also received a prize as one of six winners of the State Department's Democracy Video Challenge in Washington.

== Filmography ==
=== Feature films ===
- Trees Are Watching (2026) – Directed by Bahman Ghobadi
- Cultures of Resistance (April 2010) – Directed by Iara Lee, Cameraman
- Rhino Season (2012) – Directed by Bahman Ghobadi, VFX Director
- KASI AZ GORBEHAYE IRANI KHABAR NADAREH (2009), Music Footage Editor

=== As director ===
- Two Little Boys (2020)

=== Notable music videos ===
- Ye Mosht Sarbaz (Hichkas)
- Broken Angel (Arash feat. Helena)
- She Makes Me Go (Arash feat. Sean Paul)
- Dasa Bala (Arash feat. Timbuktu, Aylar, YAG)
- Trash The Club (DJ Aligator)
- One Day (Arash feat. Helena)
- Sex Love Rock N Roll (SLR) (Arash feat. T-Pain)
- OMG (Arash feat. Snoop Dogg)
- Goalie Goalie (Arash, Nyusha, Pitbull & Blanco)
- The Particles - Taken Away (2011) - nominated at the International Film Festival of Wales
