= Öznur Serçeler =

Turkish actress (born 1987)

- Born: 10 October 1987 (age 39); Kayseri, Turkey
- Occupation: Actress
- Years active: 2011–present
- Partner: Yiğit Güven (m. 2015)

Öznur Serçeler (born 10 October 1987) is a Turkish actress and flutist. She is known for her performance as Leyla Aydın in Erkenci Kuş.

== Life and career ==
Serçeler was born on 10 October 1987 in Kayseri. She started her studies in music in 2001 at Mersin University Conservatory. She continued her studies in music and stage arts in 2003 at Bilkent University. In 2007, she participated in the Global Youth Orchestra program and performed in Berlin, Kasel and Bodrum. In the same year, she competed in the Elite Model Look contest.

She joined in daily series Unutma Beni. She was cast in comedy series "Nuri" alongside Oktay Kaynarca, Öykü Çelik, Meltem Cumbul. Serçeler first became noted by her performance in the drama series Hayat Devam Ediyor, directed by Mahsun Kırmızıgül.

She was cast in Merhamet based novel and sequel military comedy Emret Komutanım Yeniden and youth series "Boynu Bükükler".

Her first leading role was in the series Aşkın Kanunu in 2014. In 2017, she played the role of Fatoş in the TV series Dolunay. Between 2018 and 2019, she had a recurring role in the romantic comedy series Erkenci Kuş, in which she portrayed the character of Leyla.

She then appeared alongside Sarp Apak in the movie Karışık Kaset. She was cast in franchise horror film Deccal and fantasy child film Köstebekgiller 2: Gölgenin Tılsımı and surreal parody film Dede Korkut Hikayeleri: Salur Kazan - Zoraki Kahraman which is not not based on the original story of Book of Dede Korkut.

== Filmography ==
Web series
Year	Title	Role	Notes	Network
2023	Şahmaran	Gül		Netflix
TV series
Year	Title	Role	Notes	Network
2010	Unutma Beni	Çağla	Supporting role	Fox
2011	Nuri	Kumru	Supporting role	Kanal D
2011–2013	Hayat Devam Ediyor	Mina Seferidis	Supporting role	ATV
2013	Emret Komutanım Yeniden	Banu Erdoğan	Supporting role	Kanaltürk
2013–2014	Merhamet	Melek Hemşire	Supporting role	Kanal D
2014	Boynu Bükükler	Gotik İnci	Supporting role	Kanal D
2014–2015	Aşkın Kanunu	Duru	Supporting role	TRT1
2017	Dolunay	Fatoş	Supporting role	Star TV
2018–2019	Erkenci Kuş	Leyla Aydın	Supporting role	Star TV
2022–2024	Yalı Çapkını	Asuman Korhan	Supporting role	Star TV
2024	Holding	Ceyda Altınordu	Leading role	ATV
2025	Aşk ve Gözyaşı	Sema Tunalı	Supporting role	ATV
2026	Mehmed: Fetihler Sultanı	Despina Hatun	Leading role	TRT 1
Film				
Year	Title	Role	Notes	
2015	Karışık Kaset	Pelin		
2015	Deccal	Duygu		
2016	Hayati Tehlike	Linda		
2016	Her Şey Aşktan	Neşe		
2016	Köstebekgiller 2: Gölgenin Tılsımı	Kraliçe		
2017	Dede Korkut Hikayeleri: Zoraki Kahraman - Salur Kazan	Uraz's lover		
2018	Aşk Bu Mu?	Sinem		
2022	Allah Yazdıysa Bozsun			
2022	Aynasız Haluk	Defne		
2022	Recep İvedik 7	Büşra Altın	Disney+ film	
2025	Ayakçı	Zeynep		
