= İbi =

Turkish animated television series

- Genre: Comedy; Fantasy; Adventure; Educational
- Created by: Sinan Ölmez
- Voices of: Elifcan Küçük; Alp Pazarlı; Hakan Bozbey; Akif Yardımcı; Serdar Ozap; Nusret Çetinel; Duygu Biçer
- Theme music composer: Burak Çağlar Özdemir
- Composer: Burak Çağlar Özdemir
- Country of origin: Turkey
- Original language: Turkish
- No. of seasons: 117
- No. of episodes: 9

Production
- Executive producer: Sinan Ölmez
- Production company: Koza Yayın AŞ (Kelebek Animasyon Stüdyosu)

Original release
- Network: TRT Çocuk
- Release: 15 June 2015 – 10 November 20244

İbi is a Turkish educational animated television series created by Burak Çağlar Özdemir and company Koza Yayın AŞ (Kelebek Animasyon Stüdyosu) for TRT Çocuk. Artstyle of cartoon was inspired by the animated series Adventure Time.

== Synopsys ==
The animated series follows a little pink-haired girl named Ibi and her friend, the turtle Toshi, who live in the magical land of Baldiyar and seek adventure. At the age of ten Ibi goes on an expedition with Toshi where they discover interesting solutions by applying their knowledge of mathematics, physics and other applied sciences.

== Characters ==
- Ibi (Turkish: İbi): 10-year-old girl with pink hair, wearing a blue dress. She loves adventure, is knowledgeable, smart, quick-witted, and full of energy.
- Tosi (Turkish: Tosi): turtle and Ibi's best friend. She can fly.
- Hoppa (Turkish: Hoppa): robot. He has extensive engineering knowledge and loves treasure.
- Pumbaa (Turkish: Pumba): robot and Hoppa's friend. Unlike his friend, he doesn't chase gold.
- Dodo (Turkish: Dodo): is Ibi's father.
- Lali (Turkish: Lali): Ibi's mother.
- Tidebo (Turkish: Tidebo): famous explorer from Baldiyar.

== Production ==
Animated television series İbi became the first television project in Turkey with using Toon Boom Harmony software. It was developed for children aged 6 to 8 by a 15-person team led by Sinan Ölmez at Koza Yayın AŞ (Kelebek Animasyon Stüdyosu).

The series' concept (plot, characters and the fictional world of Baldiyar) was created by Sinan Ölmez who also served as the project's designer. The script was written by Ayça Çağlayan, Sinan Ölmez and Özgün Karaca. Production took place in Ankara. The design was inspired by the animated series Adventure Time.»

The series consists of 9 seasons and 117 episodes and airs on TRT Çocuk. Since its first episode aired on June 15 2015 the series has achieved high ratings and widespread popularity.

== Episodes ==
Season	Episodes	Originally released	
Season	Episodes	First released	Last released
1	13	June 15, 2015	June 21, 2015
2	13	June 22, 2015	June 28, 2015
3	13	June 18, 2016	June 24, 2016
4	13	November 1, 2017	November 7, 2017
5	13	July 29, 2018	August 4, 2018
6	13	June 21, 2019	June 27, 2019
7	13	April 23, 2020	August 2, 2020
8	13	February 6, 2021	August 30, 2021
9	13	September 16, 2023	October 10, 2020
