= Recep İvedik 5 =

Recep Ivedik 5
- Theatrical release poster
- Directed by: Togan Gökbakar
- Written by: Şahan Gökbakar; Togan Gökbakar
- Produced by: Sahan Gökbakar; Togan Gökbakar; Amaru Son
- Starring: Şahan Gökbakar; Orkan Varan; Nurullah Çelebi; Deniz Ceylan
- Cinematography: Gerard Simon
- Edited by: Erkan Özekan
- Music by: Ömer Özgür; Jingle Jungle
- Production company: Çamaşırhane Film
- Distributed by: Mars Dağıtım
- Release date: 16 February 2017 (Turkey)
- Running time: 114 min
- Country: Turkey
- Language: Turkish
- Box office: $28,952,258

Recep İvedik 5 is a 2017 Turkish comedy film, directed by Togan Gökbakar and written by Şahan Gökbakar. It is the fifth film in the Recep İvedik film series. The film stars Şahan Gökbakar, Orkan Varan and Deniz Ceylan. The movie was released on February 16, 2017. The production of the film, which was shot in Istanbul, Antalya and Skopje, is Çamaşırhane Film. The film was watched by 7.4 million people in Turkey and earned ₺85.9 million, making it one of the country's most watched and highest-grossing films.

== Storyline ==
During his visit of condolence to İsmet's funeral, Recep İvedik feels sorry about İsmet's remaining family members due to his latest unfinished job contract which would cause hard financial situation for the family. Therefore, Recep decides to finish İsmet's last job by replacing himself as a bus driver and to transport group of athletes. Although Recep and his accompanying friend Nurullah were expecting this could be a short trip, they learn that it is not because they have to transport young national athletes to sports organization in Skopje, North Macedonia. This becomes the beginning for them to have irreversible adventure. When they are on the road, unfortunate things happen and crisis appears for the team. Recep, who believes only in victory, takes control of the situation and develops his own methods in order to make the team successful while he faces funny events. With his own unique comedy, Recep İvedik continues his adventure in this fifth story.

== Cast ==
- Şahan Gökbakar as Recep İvedik
- Orkan Varan as Akif Özeren
- Nurullah Çelebi as Nurullah Sağlam
- Deniz Ceylan as Head of Departure Hakan
- Şahabettin Karabulut as Zıp Zıp Orhan
- Gönen Fatih Yemez as Jan Klod Adnan
- Murat Bölücek as Biberli Hasan
- Ümit Özkurt as Kuleci Erdal
- Hüseyin Baycur as Beton Adem
