= Recep İvedik 6 =

2019 Turkish comedy film

- Theatrical release poster
- Directed by: Togan Gökbakar
- Written by: Togan Gökbakar; Şahan Gökbakar
- Produced by: Şahan Gökbakar; Togan Gökbakar
- Starring: Şahan Gökbakar; Nurullah Çelebi
- Cinematography: Gerard Simon
- Edited by: Ersin Eker
- Music by: Doga Ebrisim; Jingle Jungle; Ömer Özgür
- Production company: Çamaşırhane Film
- Distributed by: CJ Entertainment Turkey
- Release date: 8 November 2019
- Running time: 110 minutes
- Country: Turkey
- Language: Turkish
- Box office: $17,018,156

Recep İvedik 6 is a 2019 Turkish comedy film, directed by Togan Gökbakar and co-written with Şahan Gökbakar, starring Şahan Gökbakar and Nurullah Çelebi. It is the sixth film in the Recep İvedik film series.

== Storyline ==
Surprisingly Recep finds himself in Kenya instead of Konya (an Anatolian city of Turkey) and the adventure begins.

== Cast ==
- Şahan Gökbakar - Recep İvedik
- Nurullah Çelebi - Nurullah Sağlam
- Somer Karvan - Tur guide Ersin
- Muhammed Ali Dönmez - Nurullah's nephew
- Mbaye Dieng - Songa
- Chidi Benjamin John - Nahu Chef
- Lorraine Kadye - Zouya
- Kepsin Misodi Teke - Hunkutu Chef
- Eray Sel - Host

== Construction phase ==
=== Shooting phase ===
Filming began on September 3, 2018. It has been announced that part of the shooting will take place in the longoz forest in the Karacabey district of Bursa.

== Publishing ==
The film's vision date was initially announced as February 8, 2019. However, the vision date of the film was delayed due to disagreements between the filmmakers and movie theaters. The movie, which premiered at Kanyon Shopping Center on November 6, 2019, was released on November 8, 2019.
