= Trees Are Watching =

2026 Turkish film by Bahman Ghobadi

- Teaser poster
- Directed by: Bahman Ghobadi
- Screenplay by: Bahman Ghobadi
- Produced by: Lydia Dean Pilcher; Golriz Ehtiati; Bahman Ghobadi; Seyfi Sahin
- Starring: Eva Green; Murat Yıldırım; Lucas Akoskin; Zeynep Çamcı
- Cinematography: Saba Mazloum; Touraj Aslani
- Edited by: Farbod Khoshtinat
- Music by: Bamdad Afshar
- Production companies: Mij Film Productions; Open The Door
- Release date: 18 September 2026 (TIFF)
- Running time: 106 minutes
- Country: Turkey
- Languages: Kurdish; Turkish; English

Trees Are Watching is a 2026 Turkish psychological horror film written, directed and co-produced by Bahman Ghobadi. Starring Eva Green it depicts the bizarre events Darya, a writer meets in the forest after returning to her hometown with her daughter.

The film had its world premiere at the Centrepiece section of the 2026 Toronto International Film Festival on 18 September 2026.

== Synopsis ==
Darya, a writer fascinated by the spiritual connection between trees, returns to her hometown of Mardin with her deaf daughter. They stay in her former family home, where Darya is reminded of her childhood friendship with twin sisters, Spin and Nihal. The area around the house has been heavily deforested, leaving only two mysterious trees planted in memory of the sisters. Darya soon begins experiencing strange nightly encounters with a sinister entity that appears as a chair made from local wood. As she recalls her troubled relationship with the twins, she remembers that Nihal once claimed to be frightened by a similar supernatural presence in the house. Her fear and disturbing memories gradually cause Darya to question her own sanity.

== Cast ==
- Eva Green as Darya
- Murat Yıldırım
- Lucas Akoskin as Ross
- Zeynep Çamcı as Spin
- Eren Demir as Balıkçı
- Ozlem Tas as mother

== Production ==
The film presented by Open the Door and a MIJ Film production is written, directed and co-produced by Bahman Ghobadi, Seyfi Sahin, Lydia Dean Pilcher and Golriz Ehtiati.

The film co-produced by Martin Scorsese began filming in Istanbul, Turkey in December 2024.

== Release ==
Trees Are Watching had its world premiere in the Centrepiece section of the 2026 Toronto International Film Festival on 18 September 2026.

The film was screened for the Asian Premiere on 28 October 2026 in the Competition section of the 39th Tokyo International Film Festival, where it competed for Tokyo Grand Prix.

== Accolades ==
Award	Date of ceremony	Category	Recipient	Result	Ref.
Tokyo International Film Festival	4 November 2026	Tokyo Grand Prix	Trees Are Watching	Nominated	
