= Enis Arıkan =

Turkish actor (born 1983)

- Born: 3 January 1983 (age 43); Istanbul, Turkey
- Education: Müjdat Gezen Art Center; Istanbul Bilgi University
- Occupations: Actor, comedian, TV presenter
- Years active: 1998–present

Enis Arıkan (born 3 January 1983) is a Turkish actor, comedian and TV presenter.

Born in Istanbul, Arıkan took acting lessons at Müjdat Gezen Art Center and later graduated with a degree in Stage and Performing Arts from Istanbul Bilgi University. He made his debut in 1998 with a role in the TV series Aynalı Tahir. He continued his career in television by appearing in various TV series, including Çekirdek Aile, Kadın İsterse, Genco, Aşk ve Ceza, Cesur Hemşire and Hayat Ağacı.

Arıkan performed in various plays, including Hamlet, Kürklü Merkür, Kutlama, Altın Ejderha, Makas, 10 11 12, Garaj, Alice, and Ayı. He won the Sadri Alışık Best Theatre Actor Award for Garaj. He also won the Antalya Television Best Supporting Comedy Actor for his role in the comedy series Yerden Yüksek. He portrayed an autistic person in the drama series Uçurum. He played with Ezgi Mola for many times. His breakthrough came with his role as Tony in the comedy series Jet Sosyete by Gülse Birsel.

In 2019, he began presenting Benimle Söyle, the Turkish version of All Together Now. In 2021, he began presenting his own talk show @Enis Arıkan.

== Filmography ==
Film
Year	Title	Role	Notes
2011	Cast-ı Olan mı Var		Short film
2015	Kocan Kadar Konuş	Mehmet	
2016	Kocan Kadar Konuş: Diriliş	Mehmet	
2016	Rüya	Hakan	
2017	Küçük Ortak		
2018	Görevimiz Tatil		
2018	Kaç Kaçabilirsen	Ergüven	
2022	Benden Ne Olur?	Enis Arıkan	

Television
Year	Tite	Role	Notes
1998	Aynalı Tahir	Erman	
1998	Gülerken Ağladık		
1999	Zilyoner		
2001	Hırsız	Cem	
2002	Yıldızların Altında		
2002	Çekirdek Aile		
2003	Gurbet Kadını	Fırat	
2004	Gizli Dünyalar		
2005	Kadın İsterse	Tolga	Episode 7
2007	Genco	Cüneyt	
2008	Kurtlar Vadisi Pusu		Season 2
2009	Kapadokya Düşleri	Ahmet	
2010	Aşk ve Ceza	Alpay	Season 1
2010–2011	Yerden Yüksek	Sabit	
2012	Uçurum	Kutlu	
2014	Hayat Ağacı	Arif Gür	
2015	Eğlendirme Dairesi		TV theatre
2015	Komedi Türkiye		TV theatre
2016	Familya	Bergütay	
2016	Geldim Gördüm Güldüm Show		TV theatre
2018–2020	Jet Sosyete	Tonguç Pehlivan "Tony"	
2019–2020	Benimle Söyle	Himself	Presenter (Turkish version of All Together Now)
2020	Yasak Elma	Himself	Guest appearance
2021	@Enis Arıkan	Himself	Presenter
2021–2023	Camdaki Kız	Muzaffer Koroğlu (Muzo)	
2024	Password	Himself	Contestant
2026	Tuzlu Kahve	Taylan Kutaygil	

== Awards ==
Year	Award	Category	Work	Result	Reference
2008	Afife Theatre Awards	Most Successful Supporting Actor of the Year	Mercury Fur	Nominated	
2011	Antalya Television Awards	Best Supporting Actor in a Comedy Series	Yerden Yüksek	Won	
2014	Afife Theatre Awards	Most Successful Actor of the Year	Garaj	Nominated	
2014	Sadri Alışık Theatre and Cinema Awards	Most Successful Stage Actor of the Year	Garaj	Won	
2018	GQ Türkiye Awards	Comedian of the Year	—N/a	Won	
