= Gen (2006 film) =

- Film poster
- Directed by: Togan Gökbakar
- Written by: Güray Ölgü; Murat Toktamisoglu; Alper Mestçi
- Produced by: Murat Toktamisoglu; Kemal Kaplanoglu
- Starring: Doga Rutkay; Mahmut Gökgöz; Cemil Büyükdögerli
- Cinematography: Veli Kuzlu
- Edited by: Ilker Canikligil
- Music by: Taner Onat; Serkan Sönmezocak
- Production companies: Dada Film; Tiglon
- Distributed by: Epic Pictures Group
- Release date: 7 April 2006
- Running time: 85 mins
- Country: Turkey
- Language: Turkish

Gen is a 2006 Turkish horror film directed by Togan Gökbakar.

== Plot ==
A newly appointed doctor witnesses a series of murders in a hospital which no one can reach due to heavy snow. Everybody is suspicious of each other and searching for the killer, moreover, due to the heavy snow, no one can reach the hospital and telephone lines are jammed. In three days, the hospital, which has been quiet and peaceful over the years, faces a terror that turns nightmares into reality.

== Cast ==
=== Original ===
- Doga Rutkay as Dr. Deniz
- Mahmut Gökgöz as Head Physician Dr. Metin
- Cemil Büyükdögerli as Officer Cemil
- Mutlu Güney as Dr. Aykut
- Yurdaer Okur as Dr. Ragip
- Haldun Boysan as Officer Halil
- Zeliha Güney as Head Nurse Ipek
- Şahan Gökbakar as Separated Patient

=== English dub cast ===
- Noel Thurman as Dr. Deniz
- Michael Roemer as Head Physician Dr. Metin
- Devin Reeve as Officer Cemil
- Steve Grabowsky as Dr. Aykut
- Ali MacLean as Head Nurse Ipek
- Julie Fitzgerald as Handan
- J. Lauren Proctor as Radio Voice

== Production ==
The film was shot on location in Istanbul, Turkey.

Karl T. Hirsch produced an English language dub of the film.
