= Celal ile Ceren =

- Theatrical release poster
- Directed by: Togan Gökbakar
- Screenplay by: Şahan Gökbakar
- Produced by: Şahan Gökbakar; Emrah Çoban
- Starring: Şahan Gökbakar; Ezgi Mola
- Edited by: Erkan Özekan
- Music by: Oğuz Kaplangı
- Production company: Çamaşırhane
- Distributed by: Tiglon
- Release date: January 18, 2013 (Turkey)
- Running time: 114 minutes
- Country: Turkey
- Language: Turkish

Celal ile Ceren is a 2013 Turkish romantic comedy film directed by Togan Gökbakar and starring Şahan Gökbakar and Ezgi Mola. The film was released nationwide on 18 January 2013.

Celal ile Ceren has been accused of sexism by Turkish film critics and recognized to be one of the worst films ever made. It is considered to be a mockbuster of the high-grossing Turkish comedy Recep İvedik.

== Cast ==
- Şahan Gökbakar as Celal
- Ezgi Mola as Ceren
- Gökcen Gökçebağ as Kubilay
- Dilşah Demir as Gözde
