= The Scriptwriter =

- Theatrical Poster
- Directed by: Hulusi Orkun Eser
- Written by: Hulusi Orkun Eser
- Produced by: Hulusi Orkun Eser; Ali Eser
- Starring: Ebru Sarıtaş; Mustafa Uzunyılmaz; Halis Bayraktaroğlu; M. Asım Tuncay Aynur
- Cinematography: Ahmet Yesevi Özel
- Music by: Haluk Levent
- Production company: Chantier Films
- Distributed by: Sinema filmi
- Release date: February 26, 2016
- Running time: 86 minutes
- Country: Turkey
- Language: Turkish

The Scriptwriter (Turkish: Senarist) is a 2016 Turkish action-mystery film, written and directed by Hulusi Orkun Eser, starring Mehmet Asım Tuncay Aynur as a political author who, after failing to find a publisher for his new book, receives a note instructing him to, “find the scriptwriter.” The film went on nationwide general release across Turkey on February 26, 2016.

== Cast ==
- Mehmet Asım Tuncay Aynur as Adem
- Mustafa Uzunyılmaz as Aydın Bey
- Dilara Büyükbayraktar as Hurel
- Halis Bayraktaroğlu as Çözücü
- Murat Parasayar
- Ebru Sarıtaş
