= Algı Eke =

Turkish actress (born 1985)

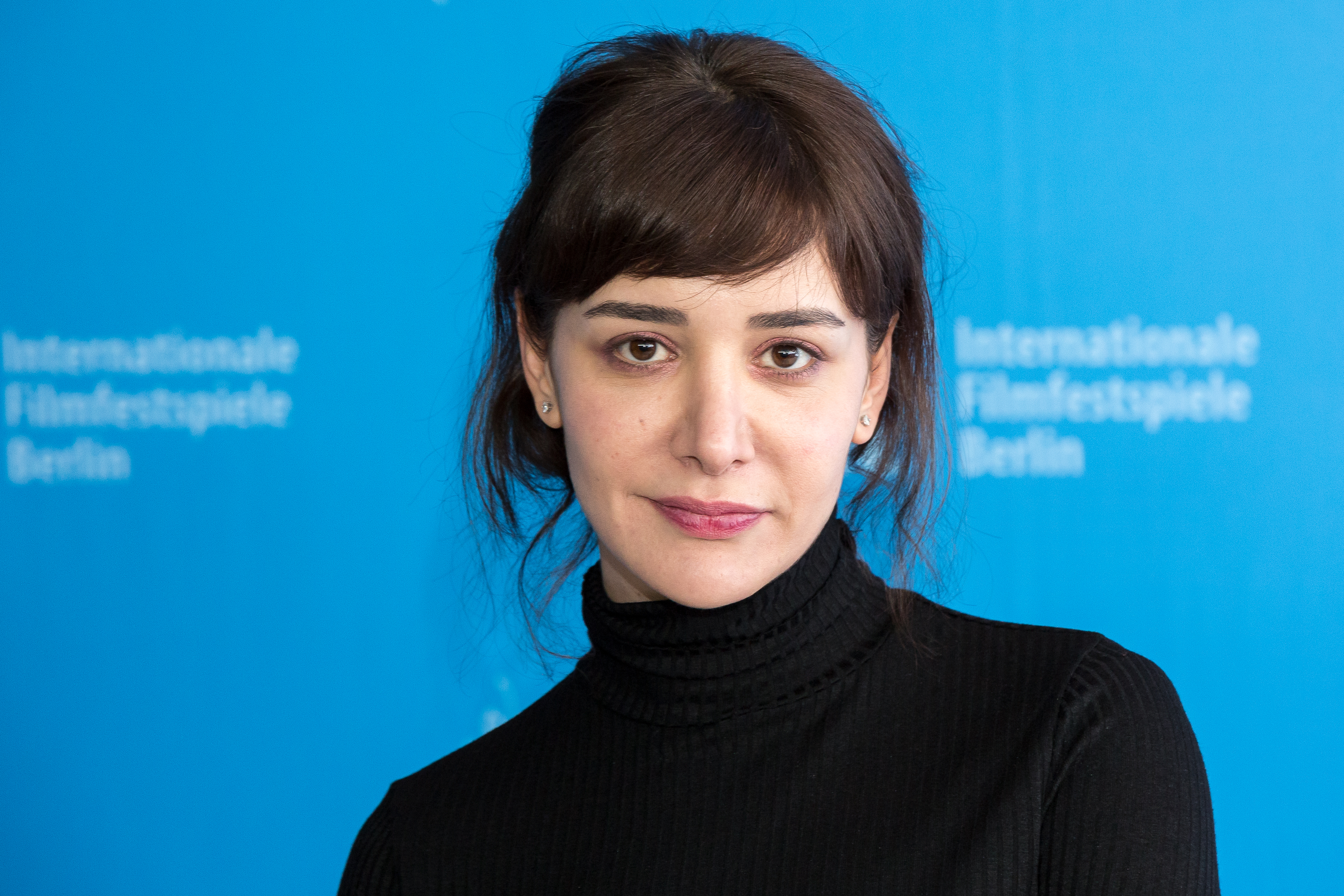
- Born: 16 September 1985 (age 40); Istanbul, Turkey
- Occupation: Actress
- Years active: 2008–present
- Spouse: İnan Ulaş Torun (m. 2017; div. 2019)

Algı Eke (born 16 September 1985) is a Turkish actress. She is best known for Galip Derviş Turkish adaptation of Monk.

She was born on 16 September 1985 in Istanbul. Her family are originally from Artvin and of Georgian descent. Her parents divorced when she was a child. Her mother died in the summer of 2013. After graduating from Cağaloğlu Anadolu Lisesi, Eke went to Berlin to continue her studies in dramaturgy. Upon her return to Turkey, she met the producer Mustafa Şevki Doğan and made her television debut with the series Baba Ocağı. She later played in the series Dürüye'nin Güğümleri, Keşanlı Ali Destanı and Annem Uyurken. Eke also appeared in Pinhani's music video for their song "Yitirmeden". She portrayed the character of Kıymet in the romantic comedy movie Kedi Özledi, opposite İlker Ayrık. It was released on 20 December 2013.

== Filmography ==
Cinema and TV movies
Year	Title	Role	Notes
2009	Mazi Yarası	Sevda	Leading role
2013	Kedi Özledi	Kıymet Sönmez	Leading role
2015	Guruldayan Kalpler	Vicdan	Leading role
2015	Yok Artık!	Melis	Supporting role
2016	Kaygı	Hasret	Leading role
2016	Kaçma Birader	Esma Tunçbilek	Leading role
2017	Cingöz Recai	Hülya	Supporting role
2017	Sucu Kamil	Merve	Leading role
Television series
Year	Title	Role	Notes
2007	Kavak Yelleri	Sekreter	Guest appearance
2008	Baba Ocağı	Kısmet Kılıçparlar	Supporting role
2010	Dürüye'nin Güğümleri	Hayriye Gülbayır	Supporting role
2011	Keşanlı Ali Destanı	Fehime	Supporting role
2012	Annem Uyurken	İclal Aycan	Supporting role
2013–2014	Galip Derviş	Hülya Uçar	Leading role
2015	Ayrılsak da Beraberiz	Berna	Leading role
2016	Hayat Sevince Güzel	Zarife Toprak	Leading role
2017	İsimsizler	Dr. Elif Toprak	Leading role
2020	Hizmetçiler	Atiye Kulaksız	Leading role
