= Dilara Büyükbayraktar =

Turkish actress (born 1989)

- Born: October 23, 1989 (age 36); İzmir, Turkey
- Occupation: Actress
- Notable work: The Scriptwriter

Dilara Büyükbayraktar (born October 23, 1989) is a Turkish actress, known for the action-mystery film The Scriptwriter (2016) and Sungurlar (2014), as well as the television series Şefkat Tepe.

Büyükbayraktar is a graduate of Anadolu University State Conservatory Theater Department. After graduation, she started to work in private theater in İzmir. The character she portrayed in Şefkat Tepe, Naza, became a popular figure, thus increasing her fan base.

== Filmography ==
Film
| Year | Title | Role |
|---|---|---|
| 2016 | Senarist | Hürel |
| 2017 | Deliysen Deliyim De | Nazlı |
| 2017 | Aç Kapıyı Çok Fenayım | Ekin |
| 2018 | İyi Ki Doğdun Abla | Ferda |
| 2019 | Siccîn 6 | Türkan |
Television
| Year | Title | Role |
| 2012–2014 | Şefkat Tepe | Naza |
| 2014–2015 | Sungurlar | Naza |
| 2019–2020 | Arka Sokaklar | Ceren |
| 2022– | Canım Annem | Melek |
