= Melek Baykal =

Turkish actress (born 1954)

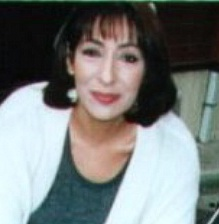
- Born: 7 August 1954 (age 71); Istanbul, Turkey
- Occupations: Theater and television actress
- Years active: 1971–present
- Spouses: Zafer Ergin (m. 1975; div. 1979) Warner Striening (m. 1984; div. 2020)

Melek Baykal (born 7 August 1954) is a Turkish actress mostly appearing in theater and TV series. For 1069 episodes, She played her roles as Nermin in hit daily series Ferhunde Hanımlar. The spin off series Cennet Mahallesi of hit gypsy comedy films Gırgıriye raised her popularity. Nurhayat. After playing in Ferhunde Hanımlar in Ankara, she got many proposals to play in TV series and movies. Because of it, she decided to move to Istanbul. Baykal started to her career when she was 17 years old in a theater by playing an 85-year-old woman. She graduated from Ankara State Conservatory worked at Ankara State Theaters for a long time. She played in the TV series Hayat Bağları and "Melek Apartmanı". She played in spin off series "Akasya Durağı" one of longest Turkish series "Çiçek Taksi". She joined to hit comedy series "Türk Malı". Melek Baykal had her cinematic debut with a movie named Kaçma Birader. In 2012, she had her own TV program on Star TV.

== Theatre ==
Year	Title	Writer	Venue
1973	İstanbul Efendisi	Musahipzade Celal	Ankara State Theatre
1974	Küçük Kolombus	Jacop Lorey	Ankara State Theatre
1974	Tilki ile Üzüm	Guilherme Figueiredo	Ankara State Theatre
1974	Yunus Emre	Recep Bilginer	Ankara State Theatre
1976	Türkmen Düğünü	Ali Yürük	Ankara State Theatre
1976	Çıkmaz	Ahmet Muhip Dıranas	Ankara State Theatre
1977	İzin Günü	Otto Fischer	Ankara State Theatre
1978	Bir Ölümün Toplumsal Anatomisi	Oktay Arayıcı	Ankara State Theatre
1980	Bağdat Hatun	Güngör Dilmen	Ankara State Theatre
1980	The House of Bernarda Alba	Federico García Lorca	Ankara State Theatre
1981	Yerma	Federico García Lorca	Ankara State Theatre
1981	Huzur Çıkmazı	Haldun Taner	Ankara State Theatre
1982	İlkbahar'da İlkbaharı Yaşamak	Alejandro Casona	Ankara State Theatre
1987	Sinan	Turan Oflazoğlu	Ankara State Theatre
1987	The Trojan Women	Euripides	Ankara State Theatre
1990	Gül Satardı Melek Hanım	Dinçer Sümer	Ankara State Theatre
1991	Düşler Yolu	Tennessee Williams	Ankara State Theatre
1992	Kız Doğdu	Tülin Tınaz Tankut	Ankara State Theatre
1993	İstanbul Efendisi	Musahipzade Celal	Ankara State Theatre
1995	Yolun Sonu	Eva Frchi	Ankara State Theatre
1999	Dolu Düşün Boş Konuş	Steven Berkoff	Oyun Atölyesi
2001	Bu Bir Rüyadır	Nâzım Hikmet Ran	Istanbul State Theatre
2002	King Lear	William Shakespeare	Istanbul State Theatre
2005	Romantika	Resul Ertaş; Yaşar Arak	TİM
2008	Sokrates'in Son Gecesi	Stefan Tsanev	Istanbul State Theatre
2016	Ahududu	Joseph Kesselring	Tiyatrokare
2018	Şen Makas	Paul Pörtner	Tiyatrokare

== Films ==
Year	Title	Role	Notes
2016	Kaçma Birader	Ramazan/Rambo	Film
2023	Bursa Bülbülü	Zeliha	Streaming film
2023	Prestij Meselesi		Film

== Series ==
Year	Title	Role	Notes
1989	Beybaba		?
1993–1999	Ferhunde Hanımlar	Nermin Yaylalı	1069 episodes
1995–1999	Melek Apartmanı	Melek	150 episodes
1999	Deli Yürek	Şaziment	?
2000–2003	Hayat Bağları	Nurhayat	168 episodes
2004–2007	Cennet Mahallesi	Pembe Erdağı	119 episodes
2008	Görgüsüzler	Pembe Erdağı	6 episodes
2008–2009	Akasya Durağı	Melahat Güneş	43 episodes
2010	Türk Malı	Berrin	11 episodes
2010	Gönül Ferman Dinlemiyor	Gönül	3 episodes
2011	Babam Sağolsun	Hayriye Hanım	8 episodes
2012	İbreti Ailem		1 episode, guest appearance
2020–2021	Babam Çok Değişti	Arife Pamuk	8 episodes
