= Kaçma Birader =

- Directed by: Defne Deliormanli; Murat Kaman
- Starring: Zafer Algöz; Melek Baykal
- Production companies: Endemol Shine Turkey; Böcek Film
- Distributed by: Mars Dağıtım
- Release date: 4 March 2016
- Running time: 1h 47min
- Country: Turkey
- Language: Turkish

Kaçma Birader is a 2016 Turkish comedy film directed by Defne Deliormanli and Murat Kaman.

== Cast ==
- Zafer Algöz - Muammer
- Melek Baykal - Ramazan Kolçak
- Emrah Kaman - Erdinç Kolçak
- Cihan Ercan - Halil Tunçbilek
- Algı Eke - Esma Tunçbilek
- Nursel Köse - Züleyha
