= Recep İvedik 4 =

- Poster of Recep İvedik 4
- Directed by: Togan Gökbakar
- Written by: Şahan Gökbakar
- Produced by: Emrah Çoban; Şahan Gökbakar
- Starring: Şahan Gökbakar; İrfan Kangı; Cem Korkmaz; Barış Bulut; Ece İncebay
- Edited by: Erkan Ozekan
- Music by: Doga Ebrisim; Jingle Jungle
- Production company: Camasirhane Film
- Distributed by: Tiglon Film
- Release date: February 21, 2014
- Running time: 117 minutes
- Country: Turkey
- Language: Turkish
- Box office: $39,477,906

Recep İvedik 4 is the sequel to Recep İvedik 3. It was released on February 21, 2014. It was directed by Togan Gökbakar and written by Şahan Gökbakar. The producer of the film was Emrah Çoban. Şahan Gökbakar played the main character of the movie.

== Storyline ==
Recep Ivedik coaches the children football team in his neighborhood. For the training he uses the only free piece of land as football field on which he used to play football as a child. Recep notices sadly that this piece of land was sold to a businessman.

== Cast ==
- Şahan Gökbakar as Recep İvedik
- İrfan Kangı as Mr. Irfan
- Cem Korkmaz as Halil Ibrahim
- Barış Bulut as Taylan
- Ece İncebay as Aslıhan
- Ekrem Aral Tuna as Arif
