= Recep İvedik 2 =

2009 film

- (iskender, Efekan)
- Directed by: Togan Gökbakar
- Written by: Serkan Altunigne; Şahan Gökbakar; Togan Gökbakar
- Produced by: Faruk Aksoy; Mehmet Soyarslan
- Starring: Şahan Gökbakar; Gülsen Özbakan; Efe Babacan
- Cinematography: Ertunç Senkay
- Edited by: Erkan Ozekan
- Music by: Oguz Kaplangi
- Production company: Aksoy Film
- Distributed by: Özen Film
- Release date: February 13, 2009
- Running time: 107 min
- Country: Turkey
- Language: Turkish
- Box office: $27,699,692

Recep İvedik 2 is a 2009 Turkish comedy film that is a sequel to Recep İvedik. The film, starring Şahan Gökbakar, was directed by Şahan Gökbakar's brother, Togan Gökbakar.

== Storyline ==
A lonely man; who has not adapted to social norms, has not developed his social skills, and therefore has never tasted love or being loved but is used to this situation; tried to get some respect from society because of his sick grandmum's wishes.

== Cast ==
- Şahan Gökbakar as Recep Ivedik
- Gülsen Özbakan as Nene Ivedik
- Efe Babacan as Hakan Ivedik
- Çagri Büyüksayar as Ali Kerem
