= Nusret Çetinel =

Turkish actor (1952–2021)

- Born: 26 January 1952; Ankara, Turkey
- Died: 1 September 2021 (aged 69); Ankara, Turkey
- Occupation: Actor
- Years active: 1976–2021
- Spouse: 1
- Children: 1

Nusret Çetinel (26 January 1952 – 1 September 2021) was a Turkish actor.

== Filmography ==
Title	Role	Type	Year
Bizim Evin Halleri		TV series	2000-2008
Büyük Buluşma		TV series	2006
Yağmurdan Sonra		TV series	2006
Hakkını Helal Et		TV series	2007
Yeşeren Düşler		TV series	2007
Nazlı Yarim		TV series	2007
Tek Türkiye		TV series	2007
Son Ağa		TV series	2008
Behzat Ç. Bir Ankara Polisiyesi		TV series	2010-2011
Tek Türkiye Son Karakol		TV series	2010-2011
Hür Adam		Film	2011
İbi		Animated TV series	2015-2024
Sevda Kuşun Kanadında		TV series	2016
İsimsizler		TV series	2017
Kardeşim İçin Der'a		TV series	2018
Aşk Ağlatır		TV series	2019
Mavera		TV film	2021
