= Hükümet Kadın 2 =

2013 Turkish comedy film

- Directed by: Sermiyan Midyat
- Written by: Sermiyan Midyat
- Produced by: BKM Film; Necati Akpınar
- Starring: Demet Akbağ; Sermiyan Midyat; Gülhan Tekin; Ercan Kesal; Bülent Çolak; Burcu Gönder
- Cinematography: Hayk Kirakosyan
- Edited by: Mustafa Preşeva; Çağrı Türkkan
- Music by: Cem Yıldız
- Distributed by: Mars Media
- Release date: 8 November 2013
- Running time: 130 minutes
- Country: Turkey
- Language: Turkish
- Box office: 8,086,350 TL

Hükümet Kadın 2 (lit. 'Government Woman 2') is a 2013 Turkish comedy film, directed and written by Sermiyan Midyat. It is a prequel to the 2013 film Hükümet Kadın and its story takes place seven years before that of the original film.
