= Selam (film) =

2013 drama film directed by Levent Demirkale

- Film poster
- Directed by: Levent Demirkale
- Written by: Necati Sahin
- Produced by: Eyup Sabri Koc
- Starring: Burcin Abdullah; Selma Alispahic; Tina Cvitanovic
- Cinematography: Aydin Iz
- Edited by: Ahmet Can Cakirca
- Music by: Yucel Arzen
- Production companies: Neyir Film; Warner Bros.
- Release date: 29 March 2013 (Turkey)
- Running time: 104 minutes
- Country: Turkey
- Language: Turkish

Selam is a Turkish drama film. It was released on March 29, 2013, and it runs for 104 minutes. The film follows the lives of 3 teachers as they leave their loved ones behind to help educate children in rural areas. This epic story directed by Levent Demirkale is based on true events that are taking place in Senegal, Afghanistan, and Bosnia and Herzegovina.

== Plot ==
Setting
Lake Retba, Senegal

The film opens with a Senegalese boy named Khadim being told that his little sister Aya has fallen off the rocks. The parents of the two kids are debating whether to take Aya to the hospital since the hospital is only for the whites, while Khadim and Aya's family is black. The parents quickly decide to go to the "whites" hospital but the hospital is too far away so they were hoping to find a car to give them a lift. A car off a white couple, who are touring the Lake Retba area, does actually pass by but the husband tells his wife to listen to the tour guide, who told them never to stop because they might be robbed. So, the white couple just pass by the black Senegal family of adults screaming for help.

Setting
Istanbul, Turkey

A Muslim, Turkish, woman (Zehra) in a veil is shown in check-in at the airport in Istanbul, when a Muslim man named Harun approaches her, she is surprised and drops her pen and breaks it. Zehra and Harun know each other and might have once been in a relationship. They are both heading to different countries to teach in schools that have been opened by Turkish entrepreneurs. Zehra is heading to Kabul Afghanistan, while Harun is heading to Senegal. They say they're farewells and exchange gifts. Harun gives Zehra a pen since hers is broken, while Zehra gives Harun a tape that she created for him. The scene shifts to a man (Adem) and his pregnant wife (Meltem) and mother (Zeyneb) also saying goodbyes. Adem is also heading to teach in a Turkish school opened by Turkish entrepreneurs in Bosnia.

Setting
Sarajevo, Bosnia and Herzegovina

Adem is teaching his students the word "Selam" or greetings. Adem says that this word has many meanings and all of them signify peace. Later, Adem shows his students a gesture that one can do that also means "Selam".

In the teachers' room, Adem is contemplating the picture of his pregnant wife Meltem that is stuck in his locker. A Miss Irina enters and asks Adem if he could talk to Almir about participating in a singing contest in an event the school will hold in Turkey. Adem asks Irina if she wants him to talk to Almir since he is Muslim and Almir is also Muslim. Irina explains that that isn't the case and the reason why the Bosnians could not remove Turkish traditions from their country is because the Turks came saying "Selam".

Setting
Kabul, Afghanistan

Zehra is teaching her students about the many rivers in Bosnia, not all of these rivers connect, but there is one thing that connects these rivers which is "Selam".

A boy named Salim and his brother decide to go to the Turkish soldiers, who were guarding there at that time, to have some meat. Salim's family is poor; so they cannot have meat. A soldier offers them some meat. Before they can eat it, their mother shows up and takes them away. Salim's brother, Mahmut, is found lying on the ground after the mother shouts at Salim for going to the soldiers to eat meat since they cannot afford it and if Mahmut tries it, he will want it every day.

Setting
Lake Retba, Senegal

Aya's brother, Khadim, is seen crying over her grave. His mother approaches him with a white T-shirt. Khadim refuses to put it on because it belongs to the whites and he believes that the whites caused his sister, Aya, to die.

Aya and Khadim's Father, Musa, goes to the school that Harun is working in as a manager to look for a job. Harun offers Musa a job, in return, Harun will offer to take Musa's son as a student in this school and also offer his family accommodation. Musa then goes to his wife and son, Khadim, to tell them about how nicely Harun treated him, but they did not believe him saying that white people are evil.

Musa, his wife, and son Khadem go to the school where Harun works. Khadem does not like the idea that he will go to a whites' school. Once the family enter, they see that Harun is playing soccer with a group of black kids. Khadem is sitting on a beach and is confused about how Harun, a white man, is treating them so well in contrast to other white people. Khadem is wondering if there are other colors than black or white and what color is hate.

Istanbul, Kabul, Senegal, Sarajevo

Eid al Adha, the second of the two Muslim holidays, has arrived and Muslims in Turkey, Afghanistan, Africa, and Bosnia are seen praying the Eid prayer. Harun, Harun's father, and Adem are all praying under the one God, Allah.

Setting
Kabul, Afghanistan

The Turks are giving away free meat for the Eid and Salim would like some for his brother Mahmut who has protein deficiency. He asks Zehra if she could give him some but she is distracted and Salim does not get meat.

Setting
Sarajevo, Bosnia and Herzegovina

Adem is teaching his students about sacrificing meat in Eid al Adha. Almir agrees to participate in the singing contest but with a condition, which is that he should participate with Sasha.

Setting
Kabul, Afghanistan

Zehra brings meat to Salim's home but Salim's mother does not want to take it because she is poor and cannot afford it if her kids ask for it again.

Setting
Sarajevo, Bosnia and Herzegovina

To practice singing, Almir takes Sasha to the bridge and tries to kill him, while doing so, they both fall into the river and Adem jumps after them. Adem manages to save them both and tells Almir not to be a river but to be a bridge. Although Adem saves them, he drowns and dies.

Setting
Istanbul, Turkey

The students and teachers in Kabul, Sarajevo, and Senegal all go to Istanbul for the contest. Harun's mother was able to save money to build a well in Senegal. It turns out that both Zehra and Harun's students are singing the same song so they end up singing together, and Harun and Zehra finally meetup. Both Almir and Sasha sing together and promise to take care of Adem's now orphaned child. The movie ends by Adem's voice saying that if one wants to be happy, he must make someone else happy, and that one must spread "Selam"

== Cast ==
- Bucin Abdullah as Zehra
- Selma Alispahić as Almir's mother
- Tina Cvitanović as Sasha
- Muhamed Dupovac as Almir
- Miraj Grbić as Nikolai
- Emre Karakoc as Samet
- Fatma Karanfil as Hacer
- Hsan Nihat Kurkcu as Adem
- Saba Mehri as Meltem
- Asja Pavlović as Irina
- Sadžida Setić as Sasha's mother
- Canan Uzun as Zeynep
- Yunus Emre Yildirimer as Harun

== Location ==
To shoot the 2013 film Selam, it took 2 years for the preparations to be made. Once the movie had its fundamental elements to start shooting, it took only 2 months for the completion of the drama Selam. Even though Selam's country of origin is Turkey, it was shot in many different locations such as Turkey itself, Afghanistan, Senegal, and Bosnia and Herzegovina. Selam is known to be the only Turkish film to be shot in 3 continents.

== Release dates ==
The film was first released in Turkey on March 29, 2013. Later on, Selam was released in Germany and the Netherlands on April 18, 2013. Following the publication of the film in Germany and Netherlands, France released it on April 19, 2013.

== Production company ==
The companies that contributed to the production of the film include Neyir Film and Warner Bros. Turkey.
