= Faruk Aksoy =

Turkish film director

Faruk Aksoy (born 1964 in Istanbul) is a Turkish film director known for his film, the Fetih 1453 (2012).
