= Recep İvedik =

2008 film

- Film poster
- Directed by: Togan Gökbakar
- Written by: Serkan Altunigne; Mehmet Ali Bayhan; Sahan Gökbakar
- Produced by: Faruk Aksoy; Ayse Germen; Mehmet Soyarslan
- Starring: Şahan Gökbakar
- Cinematography: Ertunç Şenkay
- Edited by: Erkan Özekan
- Music by: Oguz Kaplangi; Ugurcan Sezen
- Production companies: Aksoy Film; Özen Film
- Distributed by: Özen Film
- Release date: February 22, 2008
- Running time: 90 min
- Country: Turkey
- Language: Turkish
- Budget: $500,000 (estimated)
- Box office: $28,548,025

Recep İvedik is a 2008 Turkish comedy film starring Şahan Gökbakar. It was filmed after the character of Recep İvedik was caught on TV. The trailer of the film, whose trailer was watched approximately 5 million 750 thousand times on the video sharing site YouTube as of March 2008, was released on February 21, 2008 with 230 copies after the great interest it received. Watched by 791,536 people in the first three days, Recep İvedik ranked second in the list of the most watched films in Turkey in the first 3 days. It was watched by 3 million 150 thousand people in 17 days.

== Plot ==
In present-day Turkey, the unemployed Recep Ivedik is reprimanded by a police officer for harassment but is let off the hook. On his way home, he finds a hotel owner’s wallet and later sees the same man, Muhsin Basaran, on TV giving advice. Wanting to return the wallet as a sign of respect, Recep embarks on a road trip. Along the way, he helps young girls with car batteries, joins dance circles, and ends up hitchhiking with a group of eccentric rock band members after his car breaks down. Intoxicated, he eventually ends up at a restaurant where he's challenged against another man to win a car ride. Succeeding, he gets a lift from a truck driver, only to discover the driver is homosexual, which makes him uncomfortable. Despite this, he continues the journey but leaves the truck when the driver makes sexual advances towards Recep.

Recep hitchhikes for the duration of the trip, returns the wallet to Basaran at a hotel, and plans to leave until he sees his childhood love, Sibel. As a result, he asks for extra nights in order to reconnect with her. Hotel life proves challenging as he embarrassingly locks himself out of his room in a bath towel, causing the hotel manager Erim discomfort. After regaining access to his room, he bonds with a receptionist over a drink. Erim assigns the receptionist to keep an eye on Recep to prevent further mishaps. The next morning, Recep accidentally knocks Sibel into a pool causing a brief quarrel between the two; it’s clear that she doesn't recognize him.

Recep purchases summer attire and attempts to join Sibel’s volleyball game, but she refuses. Undeterred, he joins the opposing team, leading them to victory. However, Sibel declines the trophy he offers. At a buffet, Recep overeats, embarrassing Erim. There, while sitting with Sibel and her mother, he faces weight-related insults and leaves. Wanting to impress Sibel, he asks Erim if he can join aerobics, to which he agrees, but Erim buys him embarrassing pink attire for it. Despite this, Recep attends the class, performing oddly and unsettling Sibel, while Erim finds amusement in the situation.

An aquatic instructor appears, reminding Sibel and her mother of their upcoming scuba class. Recep joins the class; there, he irritates the instructor with rude antics. As the group prepares to dive, Recep sneaks off to an island where an adult film is being shot. He disrupts it, insults the director, then returns to the hotel. He scolds Sibel and her mother for not finding him; Sibel responds by informing him of her mother’s illness, triggering memories of Recep’s grandmother's death. He hands Sibel a conch, insults her mother, and leaves. It is clear that Sibel is catching feelings for Recep.

Recep returns to his hotel room and asks the receptionist to accompany him to the hotel disco, but the receptionist declines. Frustrated, Recep goes alone. At the disco, he sees Sibel with another man and confronts them. He challenges the man to a dance battle, impressing the audience with his moves. After winning, Recep drinks heavily as a prize. The next morning, he's found by Sibel's mother, hungover by the hotel pool. While she berates him, he spots Sibel entering the spa area with a masseur. Determined, he follows them. Recep, pretending to urgently need the bathroom, sneaks into the massage parlor, covering the masseur’s face with a towel upon finding him. He enters the room he thinks Sibel is in, only to find a different woman covered in towels. Meanwhile, Sibel arrives late and discovers her room occupied by Recep, so she takes another. Unaware of the mix-up, Recep begins an intimate massage, only to realize he's with the wrong client when he notices swollen feet. The client misinterprets Recep's compliments, and Recep, embarrassed, flees the parlor. He notices Sibel on the way out, briefly asking where she was, then continues to flee.

A photographer later approaches Recep for a picture. Initially hesitant, he strikes a triumphant pose before switching to a rude one, much to Sibel's amusement. She joins him for a selfie and invites him to a hotel comedy event, which he agrees to attend. Onstage, Recep inadvertently becomes a contestant in a partner game. His earlier massage client volunteers to be his partner, much to his dismay. In the game, they must pop balloons by sitting on each other. However, the client's weight breaks the chair, embarrassing Recep, who fat-shames her in frustration.

Recep is caught drinking from a display fountain by Erim, who berates him for insulting his game partner and causing problems. Recep threatens to tear down the hotel with his trucker community, much to the confusion of Erim. Moments later, the truckers arrive, ready to carry out the threat. Erim tries to stop them by being friendly, but they threaten him in response. Recep warns Erim that if he ever tries to kick him out again, the hotel will be torn down.

Later, on the beach, Sibel breaks off her engagement over the phone due to her new-found feelings for Recep, causing her mother to intervene. They argue, and her mother storms off. Recep finds Sibel upset and comforts her. A few minutes later, when Sibel's mother is in danger of being hit by a horse, Recep rushes to save her, but she confuses this as assault and berates him, all the while ordering for medical assistance. Recep, exhausted, then collapses onto a floating tube, unaware it's connected to a speedboat. The boat suddenly accelerates, throwing Recep into the ocean, where he curses at it from afar.

In the hotel infirmary, Sibel and her mother engage in another heated argument about Sibel's love interests, leading Sibel to storm out. Meanwhile, Recep is chatting with his receptionist at an outdoor bar. Spotting Sibel on the beach, he approaches her, trying to lighten the mood with jokes, only to be blindsided when she reveals she's engaged and can't reciprocate his feelings. Devastated, Recep flees. That night, on the beach, he tearfully sings a song, catching the attention of his concerned receptionist. Recep confides in him about feeling tormented by his relationships. The next morning, Recep abruptly decides to leave the hotel, instructing the receptionist to deliver a bag of marbles to Sibel, its significance unknown. After an emotional farewell, Recep departs. Erim reprimands the receptionist for Recep's behavior, leading to his firing. But spotting Sibel and her mother leaving, he remembers Recep's gift and rushes to the airport to deliver it to her. As Sibel examines the marbles, she realizes they're from their childhood, dawning on her that Recep was her long-lost childhood love.

== Cast ==
- Şahan Gökbakar as Recep İvedik
- Fatma Toptaş as Sibel
- Tuluğ Çizgen as Sibel's mother
- Lemi Filozof as Fazil
- Hakan Bilgin as Müdür
