= CM101MMXI Fundamentals =

- Theatrical release poster
- Directed by: Murat Dündar
- Written by: Cem Yılmaz
- Produced by: CMYLMZ Fikirsanat
- Starring: Cem Yılmaz
- Cinematography: Gökhan Tiryaki; Şükrü Ayar
- Edited by: İlker Özcan
- Music by: Sertaç Özgümüş
- Distributed by: Tiglon
- Release date: January 3, 2013
- Running time: 115 minutes
- Country: Turkey
- Language: Turkish
- Box office: 21.074.048,58 $

CM101MMXI Fundamentals is a 2011 Turkish stand up comedy directed by Murat Dündar. The theatrical release of the show was in 2013. In the first week, the movie attracted an audience of more than 600,000 people.
