= Husband Factor =

- Theatrical release poster
- Directed by: Kivanç Baruönü
- Starring: Ezgi Mola; Murat Yıldırım
- Distributed by: United International Pictures
- Release date: 20 March 2015
- Running time: 108 minutes
- Country: Turkey
- Language: Turkish
- Box office: ₺20 million

Husband Factor (Turkish: Kocan Kadar Konuş) is a 2015 Turkish comedy film directed by Kivanç Baruönü.

== Cast ==
- Ezgi Mola - Efsun
- Murat Yıldırım - Sinan
- Nevra Serezli - Peyker
- Gülenay Kalkan - Gönül
- Ebru Cündübeyoğlu - Nur
- Eda Ece - Ceren
- Begüm Öner - Merve
- Gül Arıcı - Tuğçe
- Muhammet Uzuner - Yazar
- Şebnem Sönmez - Aysel
- Bora Akkaş - Mehmet Lütfi
- Enis Arıkan - Mehmet
