= Şahan Gökbakar =

Turkish comedian and actor

- Born: 22 October 1980 (age 45); İzmir, Turkey
- Education: Bilkent University
- Occupations: Actor, comedian
- Spouse: Selin Gökbakar (m. 2015)
- Children: 2

Şahan Gökbakar (born 22 October 1980) is a Turkish comedian, actor and producer.

== Early life ==
Born in İzmir, Gökbakar grew up in Turkey's capital, Ankara, attending the primary school and high school attached to the Middle East Technical University (ODTÜ). After completing high school in 1997, he went on to study acting at Bilkent University's Faculty of Music and Performing Arts in Ankara. After graduating in 2002, he moved to Istanbul.

== Career ==
=== Television ===
After making himself known to Turkish audiences with his Candid Camera-style show, Zoka, he became hugely popular with his sketch comedy series, "Dikkat Şahan Çıkabilir", in which he portrayed many different characters. After concluding the series on 2006 after two successful seasons on two different networks, he went on to shoot a late night talk show at NTV, named "Kime Diyorum Ben."

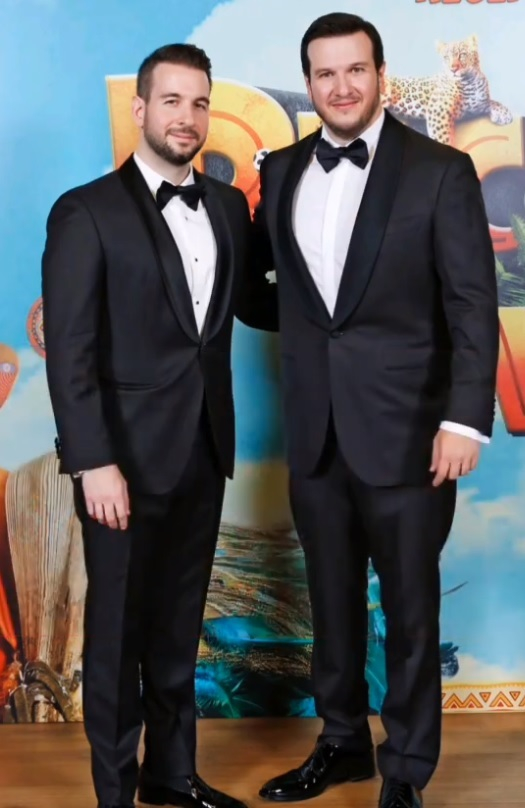
Şahan Gökbakar with his brother, Togan Gökbakar

His sketches, especially from "Dikkat Şahan Çıkabilir" are still widely circulated and watched in YouTube and other social media platforms, achieving near-cult status in Turkey. The main character of his record setting movie series, Recep İvedik, was also created for a short sketch in "Dikkat Şahan Çıkabilir."

=== Movie career ===
After guest starring in Gen, a movie directed by his brother, Togan Gökbakar, he kick-started his movie career with his 2008 movie, Recep İvedik, also directed by Togan Gökbakar. The movie became the highest-grossing Turkish movie of all time, a record which was broken by its sequel, Recep İvedik 2, a year later. The series went on to shatter box office records with four more sequels. To this day, Recep İvedik 5 and Recep İvedik 4 are, in that order, highest-grossing movies of all time in Turkey. The series are also very popular in neighboring countries of Turkey and in Europe, especially in countries with significant Turkish population.

In 2011, he and his brother Togan Gökbakar founded their own production company, Çamaşırhane Film.

In 2013, he produced and starred in Celal ile Ceren with Ezgi Mola as co-star, a romantic comedy which was again very successful both commercially and critically. His other films include Osman Pazarlama in 2016 and Kayhan in 2018.

He is producer and co-director of the 2020 movie, Zengo.

It is rumored that he has reached an agreement with Disney+ for the exclusive rights to his upcoming blockbuster, Recep İvedik 7.

== Personal life ==
He married Selin Gökbakar (née Ortaçlı) in 2015, the couple have two children together: Deniz Efe Gökbakar (b. 30 November 2015) and Ela Gökbakar (b. 16 March 2017)

He is a Galatasaray S.K. fan and a voting member of the club.

=== Environmental efforts ===
During 2021 Turkey Wildfires, Gökbakar was very active both in the field and in social media, providing information from the ground and raising awareness about the importance of fire-fighting planes.

He opposed the mining activities at Mound Ida region and campaigned against it in 2019. In March 2022, he opposed the opening of olive groves to mining activities. Gökbakar said, "Olive trees are the wealth of this country. I invite the Ministry of Energy and Natural Resources to return from this mistake."

== Portrayal of Recep İvedik ==
The success and influence of Recep İvedik has been the subject of countless debates and even academical research in both Turkey and abroad. Its success has spawned many similar movies and is considered as a cult series in Turkey.

Recep İvedik, had according to Hürriyet Daily News reviewer Emrah Güler, enjoyed some moderate fame as the anti-hero in comedian Şahan Gökbakar’s sketch shows, generating a modest fan group on YouTube. Gökbakar teamed up with his younger brother Togan Gökbakar, who first made his name as a director with some short films and had always showed an interest in working with his older brother, to turn the character into a cash cow with a series of films, which proved to be the highest grossing movies in the respective years of their release and at the same time the most loathed films to come to screens in the minds of critics and intellectuals.

== Filmography ==
=== Cinema movies ===
Released	Title	Role	Turkey Box Office Year-End	Notes
7 April 2006	Gen	Quarantined Patient	42	Guest appearance
15 February 2008	Recep İvedik	Recep İvedik	1	
13 February 2009	Recep İvedik 2	Recep İvedik	1	
12 February 2010	Recep İvedik 3	Recep İvedik	2	
18 January 2013	Celal ile Ceren	Celal	3	
21 February 2014	Recep İvedik 4	Recep İvedik	1	
19 February 2016	Osman Pazarlama	Osman Şaşmaz	4	
16 February 2017	Recep İvedik 5	Recep İvedik	1	
9 February 2018	Kayhan	Kayhan	27	
8 November 2019	Recep İvedik 6	Recep İvedik	1	
9 December 2022	Recep İvedik 7	Recep İvedik	—N/a	released on Disney+

=== Television programs ===
- Zoka (TV8 and Show TV) (2004)
- Dikkat Şahan Çıkabilir (TV8 and ATV) (2005)
- Leyt Nayt Şov: Kime Diyorum Ben (NTV) (2006)
- Kolay Gelsin (Kanal 1) (2008)
