= Hükümet Kadın =

2013 film

- Directed by: Sermiyan Midyat
- Written by: Sermiyan Midyat
- Produced by: BKM Film; Necati Akpınar
- Starring: Demet Akbağ; Sermiyan Midyat
- Cinematography: Hayk Kirakosyan
- Edited by: Mustafa Preşeva; Çağrı Türkkan
- Music by: Cem Yıldız
- Distributed by: Mars Media
- Release date: 1 February 2013
- Running time: 130 minutes
- Country: Turkey
- Language: Turkish

Hükümet Kadın (Government Woman) is a 2013 Turkish comedy film directed by Sermiyan Midyat.

== Premise ==
One day Midyat's mayor loses his life in a car accident. His wife Xate must do his job.

== Cast ==
- Demet Akbağ - Xate
- Sermiyan Midyat - Faruk
- Mahir İpek - Ikram
- Gülhan Tekin - Fehime
- Burcu Gönder - Güle
- Ercan Kesal - Aziz Veysel
- Nazmi Kırık - Ferhat
- Cezmi Baskın - Eşekçi Feyzullah
- Ayberk Atilla - Şeyhmuz
- Sarp Aydınoğlu - Teacher (Ögretmen)
- Bülent Çolak - Baran
- Haki Biçici - Behçet
- Renan Bilek - Inspector (Müfettis) Tugrul
- Kemal Uçar - Commander (Komutan) Celal
