= Ezgi Mola =

Turkish actress (born 1983)

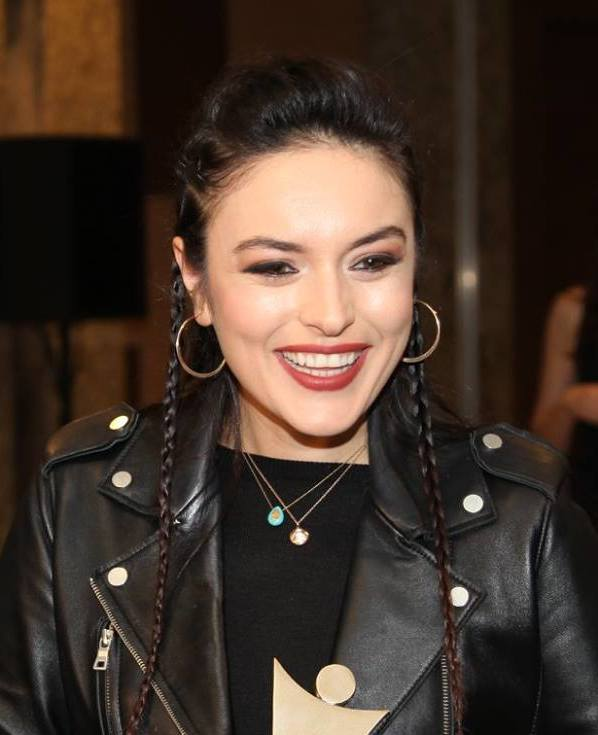
- Mola in 2016
- Born: Mercan Ezgi Mola; 29 March 1983 (age 43); Istanbul, Turkey
- Occupation: Actress
- Years active: 1998–present
- Spouse: Mustafa Aksakallı (m. 2023; div. 2025)
- Children: 1

Mercan Ezgi Mola (born 29 March 1983) is a Turkish actress who acted in several prominent Turkish movies and TV series.

== Biography ==
Ezgi is known for her successful run in the cinema as well as theatre in her career. She has performed in an improvisation theater "Arkadaşım Hoşgeldin". After studying at Akademi İstanbul, She studied at Müjdat Gezen Arts Center for 4 years under Aydoğan Temel and also appeared first in his play Çürük Elma. In 2005, she joined BKM Theatre. In 2019 Mola acted as the Queen of Hearts in a Musical adaption based on the Alice in Wonderland by Lewis Carroll.

She appeared alongside Ugur Yücel in the series Hırsız Polis and "Canım Ailem". She played in period series "Kötü Yol" based from classic novel. She won Golden Butterfly Award Best Actress for her role in series Masumlar Apatmanı. She played an actress and her many roles in Netflix spin off comedy series Erşan Kuneri.

She has a good box office success in her cinema career. In 2006, she acted in the movie Hayatımın Kadınısın for which she won the Sadri Alışık award.

== Controversy ==
In August 2020, Mola criticized a Turkish soldier, Musa Orhan, who was released from prison, despite being accused of sexual assault in Siirt, and whose Kurdish victim, İpek Er, died in hospital. In June 2021, both Orhan's lawyer and the office of the chief public prosecutor filed a lawsuit against Mola on charges of 'insulting with an audio, written and video message', demanding a prison sentence of up to 2 years and 4 months. In May 2022, she was fined over 400 dollars for insulting Orhan.

== Filmography ==
=== Film ===
Year	Title	Role	Notes
2004	Hızlı Adımlar	Selen	TV film
2005	Organize İşler	Berrak	Film
2006	Hayatımın Kadınısın	Ahu	Film
2006	Hokkabaz	Nurse	Film
2009	Ejder Kapanı		Film
2010	Veda	Latife Hanım	Film
2011	Ay büyürken uyuyamam		Film
2011	Celal Tan ve Ailesinin Aşırı Acıklı Hikayesi	Jülide	Film
2011	Dedemin İnsanları	Fatma	Film
2012	Pazarları Hiç Sevmem	Ayşe	Film
2013	Celal ile Ceren	Ceren	Film
2013	Sen Aydınlatırsın Geceyi	Çiğdem	Film
2013	Soğuk	Boncuk	Film
2013	Patron Mutlu Son İstiyor	Eylül	Film
2015	Kocan Kadar Konuş	Efsun	Film
2016	Kocan Kadar Konuş: Diriliş	Efsun	Film
2017	Maide'nin Altın Günü	Maide	Film
2018	Aydede	Rabia	Film
2018	Kelebekler	Sevtap	Film
2019	Organize İşler 2: Sazan Sarmalı	Lerzan Berrak	Film
2019	Lady Winsley'i Kim Öldürdü	Azra	Film
2021	Seni Buldum Ya	Lerzan Berrak	Mubi Film

=== TV Theatre ===
Year	Title	Role	Notes
2008	Kolay Gelsin	Kezo	
2014–2015	Arkadaşım Hoşgeldin	Ezgi	
2023	Alice Müzikali	Kraliçe	

=== Web series ===
Year	Title	Role	Notes
2018	Bartu Ben		Guest
2020	Jet Sosyete	İpek	Guest
2022	Erşan Kuneri	Alev Alev	Leading role

=== TV series ===
Year	Title	Role	Notes
2000	Karate Can		Guest
2002	Unutma Beni		
2003	Sultan Makamı		Guest
2004	Görünmez Adam	Gülizar	
2005–2006	Hırsız Polis	Gülay	
2007	Senden Başka	Hayriye	
2008	Sınıf	Esra	
2008–2010	Canım Ailem	Feride	
2010	Güneydoğudan Öyküler Önce Vatan	Ayşe	Guest
2011	Bir Ömür Yetmez	Hazal	
2012	Yalan Dünya		Guest
2012	Kötü Yol	Leman Aksular	
2020–2022	Masumlar Apartmanı	Safiye Derenoğlu Ataç	
