= Togan Gökbakar =

Turkish film director

- Born: 29 May 1984 (age 42); İzmir, Turkey
- Occupation: Film director
- Years active: 2004–present

Togan Gökbakar (born 29 May 1984) is a Turkish film director.

== Biography ==
Togan Gökbakar studied in the Cinema and TV Department at Istanbul Bilgi University and his 2004 graduate short film Run Daddy Run was shown at the If Istanbul and Altın Koza film festivals where it won a prize in the student category.

His first features was the 2006 Turkish horror film Gen from a story idea by Alper Mestçi and his older brother Şahan Gökbakar, who also made a cameo appearance in the film. He went on to direct his brother in a series of successful Turkish comedy films, starting with Recep İvedik in 2008.
