= List of Turkish television series =

The following list is all known Turkish television series sorted by year.

== 2026 ==
2026
TV series	Episodes	Season	Final	TV channel	Notes
A.B.İ.	23	2	Final	ATV	Official Page
Alıkara	10	1	—	BeIN Connect	Official Page
Altı Üstü İstanbul	21	1	—	ATV	Official Page
Anne Yarısı	8	1	—	NOW	Official Page
Asırlık Gece	15	1	Final	TRT 1	Official Page
Asylum	8	1	—	Tabii	Official Page
Asiye	4	1	—	Kanal 7	Official Page
Aşk ve Taht	5	1	Final	ATV	Official Page
Aynı Yağmur Altında	7	1	Final	ATV	Official Page
Ayrılık da Sevdaya Dahil	8	1	—	Netflix	Official Page
Ayşe: Bir Ruh Macerası	10	1	—	Tabii	Official Page
Başbaşa	13	1	—	BeIN Connect	Official Page
Başkalarının Hayatı	8	1	—	Star TV	Official Page
Benim Adım Aylamaz	10	1	—	Tabii	Official Page
Bize Bi'şey Olmaz	8	1	—	Disney+	Official Page
Cevher	Episode 1 - coming soon	1	—	Show TV	Official Page
Çiçekçi Kız	3	1	—	BeIN Connect	Official Page
Çirkin	11	2	Final	Star TV	Official Page
Daha 17	26	1	—	Kanal D	Official Page
Delikanlı	7	1	Final	Show TV	Official Page
Doğanın Kanunu	13	1	Final	Star TV	Official Page
Doktor: Başka Hayatta	6	1	Final	NOW	Official Page
Evlilik Güzeldir	10	1	—	TRT 1	Official Page
Güneşin Doğduğu Yer	9	1	—	ATV	Official Page
Haysiyet	10	1	Final - Dec 8	Kanal D	Official Page
Harman Yeri	10	1	—	Tabii	Official Page
Her Şey Mümkün	13	1	—	BeIN Connect	Official Page
İmam Gazâlî: Hüccet'ül-İslam	10	1	—	Tabii	Official Page
Leyla Hali	10	1	—	Tabii	Official Page
Masumiyet Müzesi	9	1	—	Netflix	Official Page
Menekşe	Episode - 1 November 30	1	—	Show TV	Official Page
Mercan Köşk	7	1	Final	ATV	Official Page
Mira	8	1	—	HBO Max	Official Page
Muhabir	10	1	—	Tabii	Official Page
Muhtemel Aşk	22	1	—	Show TV	Official Page
Onbeşliler	10	1	—	Tabii	Official Page
Organize İşler: Karun Hazinesi	8	1	—	Netflix	Official Page
Ömür Usta	9	1	—	NOW	Official Page
P.A.Y.	8	1	—	Tabii	Official Page
Rafıklar	9	1	—	Kanal 7	Official Page
Seni Tanıyorum	8	1	—	Netflix	Official Page
Sevdam Karadeniz	4	1	Final	NOW	Official Page
Sevdan Bir Ateş	11	1	—	Show TV	Official Page
Sevdiğim Sensin	25	2	—	Star TV	Official Page
Son Kare	8	1	—	GAİN	Official Page
Sonra Gözler Görür	Episode - 1/8; December 17	1	—	Netflix	Official Page
Sumud	10	1	—	Tabii	Official Page
Susuz Yaz	Episode - 1 December 1	1	—	Kanal D	Official Page
Şule: Senin Hikâyen	10	1	—	Tabii	Official Page
Temiz Para	10	1	—	Tabii	Official Page
Tozkoparan İskender: Kaos	10	1	—	Tabii	Official Page
Tuzlu Kahve	11	1	—	Star TV	Official Page
Yeraltı	23	2	—	NOW	Official Page

== 2025 ==
2025
TV series	Episodes	Final	Note
% İki	20	No	Tabii web series
Adsız Aşıklar	8	No	Netflix series
Aile Saadeti	13	Final	
Aşkı Hatırla	8	No	Disney web series
Arafta	35	—	YouTube
Arafta	100	Final	Kanal 7
Başka Bir Gün	10	Final	
Bir İhtimal Daha Var	8	No	Netflix series
Bir Zamanlar İstanbul	16	Final	
Çarpıntı	13	Final	Star TV
Cihangir Cumhuriyeti	10	No	Tabii web series
Çift Kişilik Oda	6	No	
Eşref Rüya	47	Final	
Güller ve Günahlar	42	No	
Halef: Köklerin Çağrısı	43	Final	
Hatıran Yeter	4	Final	Gain web series
İstanbul Ansiklopedisi	8	No	Netflix series
Karma	14	No	Exxen series
Kara Kenan	8	No	Exxen web series
Kardelenler	10	Final	
Kasaba	8	No	Netflix series
Kız Babası	10	No	Tabii web series
Kuma	100	Final	daily series
Kuruluş: Orhan	26	Final	
Kral Kaybederse	30	Final	
Modern Kadın	9	No	Gain web series
Ölüm Kime Yakışır		upcoming	Turkcell TV+ web series
Piyasa	6	Final	
Siyah Bere	10	No	Tabii web series
Sustalı Ceylan	6	Final	
Sürgünler	10	No	Tabii web series
Şeytan Adasında Esir Türk: Polis Cemil	4	No	Tabii web series
Vefa Sultan	56	Final	
Taşacak Bu Deniz	39		
Tertemiz	4	No	Exxen web series
Yankı: Görünmez El	23	No	Tabii web series
Zembilli	13	Final	

== 2024 ==
2024
TV series	Episodes	Final	Note
Annem Ankara	15	Final	
Anonim	5	Final	Exxen web series
Arjen	6	Final	Gain web series
Asaf	6	Final	Netflix series
Aşk Evlilik Boşanma	4	Final	
Aşka Düşman	4	Final	
Ayazın Sonu Güneş	75	Final	daily series
Aziz Mahmud Hüdayi: Aşkın Yolculuğu	20	Final	
Bahar	64	Final	
Bir Gece Masalı	35	Final	
Bir Sevdadır	13	Final	
Bizi Birleştiren Hayat	150	Final	daily series
Can Borcu	22	No	
Çırak	10	Final	Tabii web series
Çok Güzel Hareketler Çocuk	10	Final	Tabii web kids theatre
Deha	31	Final	
Deli Zekalılar	5	Final	Youtube web series
Dengeler: Biri Olmak	8	Final	Gain web series
Düğüm	8	Final	Amazon prime series
Esas Oğlan	8	Final	Gain web series
Gaddar	20	Final	
Gassal	40	Final	Tabii web series
Gelin	518	No	Daily series
Gizli Bahçe	6	Final	
Güzel Aşklar Diyarı	6	Final	
Holding	4	Final	
İnci Taneleri	51	Final	
Kalpazan	8	Final	
Kara Ağaç Destanı	30	Final	
Karadut	6	Final	
Karşılaşmalar	7	Final	Exxen web series
Kimler Geldi Kimler Geçti	16	Final	Netflix series
Kopuk	5	Final	
Korkma Ben Yanındayım	7	Final	
Kör Nokta	4	Final	
Kötü Kan	6	Final	
Kurtuluş Lisesi	13	Final	Gain web series
Kuvvetli Bir Alkış	6	Final	Netflix series
Kübra	16	Final	Netflix series
Kül Masalı	10	Final	
Leyla: Hayat... Aşk... Adalet...	37	No	
Mahsun J	11	No	Gain web series
Marnalı	10	Final	Tabii web series
Mehmed: Fetihler Sultanı	92	No	
Naser	1	Final	Tabii web series
O Öyle Olmadı	4	Final	Youtube series
Ru	8	No	Gain web series
Rüzgarlı Tepe	207	No	daily series
Sahipsizler	51	Final	
Sen Ağlama İstanbul	8	Final	
Senden Önce	3	Final	
Siyah Kalp	34	Final	
Sorgu	10	No	Tod web series
Şakir Paşa Ailesi: Mucizeler ve Skandallar	15	No	
Taş Kağıt Makas	19	Final	
Tozkoparan İskender: Sır	10	Final	Tabii web series
Uzak Şehir	73	No	
Yaban Çiçekleri	3	Final	
Yalan	30	Final	
Yan Oda	4	Final	
Yarın Yokmuş Gibi	4	Final	Gain web series
Zamanın Kapıları	10	No	Tod web series

== 2023 ==
2023
TV series	Episodes	Final	Note
1973 Biltmore Oteli Cinayeti	6	Final	Tabii web series
Adım Farah	27	Final	
Adalet	10	Final	Tabii web series
Aile	30	Final	
Akıncı	30	Final	animation series
Akif	13	Final	Tabii web series
Aktris	8	Final	Disney series
Al Sancak	19	Final	
Altay	1	Final	Tabii web series
Altın Kafes	4	Final	
Arak: Kara	5	Final	
Arayış	6	Final	Disney series
Aşkımız Yeter	20	Final	Tabii web series
Ateş Kuşları	54	Final	
Bambaşka Biri	16	Final	
Başım Belada	5	Final	
Ben Bu Boşluğu Nasıl	6	Final	BluTv web series
Benim Güzel Ailem	22	Final	
Bir Derdim Var	6	Final	
Biz Kimden Kaçıyorduk Anne	7	Final	Netflix series
Dayton	6	Final	Tabii web series
Deneme Çekimi	6	Final	Blutv web series
Derin Mor	8	Final	Tabii web series
Dilek Taşı	20	Final	
Dokuz Oğuz	6	Final	
Dönence	14	Final	
Dünya Bu	8	Final	Gain web series
Ego	13	Final	
Eyvah Ramazan Bey	20	Final	Tabii web series
Fedakar	50	Final	daily series
Gülcemal	13	Final	
Hay Sultan	20	No	Tabii web series
Hayatımın Neşesi	18	Final	
Hudutsuz Sevda	63	No	
Hür	10	Final	Tabii web series
Kader Bağları	5	Final	
Kader Oyunları	80	Final	daily series
Kaküllü Kız	4	Final	Hoox web series
Kapı	10	Final	Tabii web series
Kendi Düşen Ağlamaz	27	Final	
Kısmet	10	Final	
Kirli Sepeti	40	Final	
Kod Adı: Kırlangıç	95	No	
Koyu Beyaz	8	Final	Tabii web series
Kraliçe	11	Final	
Kudüs Fatihi Selahaddin Eyyubi	58	Final	
Kuzgun: Dipsiz Karanlık	10	Final	Tabii web series
Kızıl Elma: Bir Fetih Öyküsü	8	Final	Tabii web series
Küçük Dahi: İbn-i Sina	20	Final	Tabii web series
Leylifer	1	Final	
Magarsus	20	Final	Blutv web series
Mahsusa: Trablusgarb	18	Final	Tabii web series
Maviye Sürgün	25	Final	
Metamorfoz: Kırılma	10	Final	Tabii web series
Mevlânâ Celâleddîn-i Rûmî	30	Final	Tabii web series
Modern Doğu Masalları	8	No	Tabii web series
Ne Gemiler Yaktım	8	Final	
Olay Yeri	1	Final	Youtube series
Organizasyon Bizim İşimiz	10	Final	Tabii web series
Ömer	54	Final	
Prens	19	No	BluTv web series
Ruhun Duymaz	9	Final	
Safir	26	Final	
Sakla Beni	26	Final	
Sandık Kokusu	50	Final	
Sarmaşık Zamanı	16	Final	Tod web series
Sen Ben O	8	Final	BluTv web series
Serhat	10	Final	Tabii web series
Sığınak	18	Final	
Son Gün	8	Final	Tabii web series
Su Koruyucuları: Okula Dönüş	6	Final	Short series
Şahane Hayatım	30	Final	
Shahmaran	14	No	Netflix series
Şanzelize Düğün Salonu	8	Final	Tabii web series
Şebeke	10	Final	Tabii web series
Taçsız Prenses	13	Final	
Tetikçinin Oğlu	7	Final	
The Tailor	23	Final	Netflix series
Tozkoparan İskender: Gölge	10	Final	Tabii web series
Üniversdeli	10	Final	Tabii web series
Üvey Anne	8	Final	
Veda Mektubu	24	Final	
Vermem Seni Ellere	9	Final	
Ya Çok Seversen	13	Final	
Yabani	51	Final	
Yalnız Kalpler	100	Final	daily series
Yangın Günleri: Independenta	8	Final	Tabii web series
Yaratılan	8	Final	Netflix series
Yardımcı Oyuncu	10	Final	Tabii web series
Yaz Şarkısı	8	Final	
Yeşil Deniz: Milenyum	20	No	Tabii web series
Yeşil Vadi'nin Kızı	73	Final	
Yıldızlar Bana Uzak	4	Final	
Yüz Yıllık Mucize	13	Final	

== 2022 ==
2022
TV series	Episodes	Final	Note
Adı Sevgi	11	Final	
Ah Nerede	7	Final	
Aldatmak	71	Final	
Alman Kuzusu	52	Final	
Andropoz	6	Final	Netflix series
Annenin Sırrıdır Çocuk	11	Final	
Aslında Özgürsün	9	Final	Gain web series
Aşk Kumardır	7	Final	Exxen web series
Aşk ve Umut	285	Final	daily series
Aşkın Yolculuğu: Hacı Bayram-ı Veli	28	Final	
Baba: Bir Anadolu Hikayesi	30	Final	
Balkan Ninnisi	25	Final	
Barbaros Hayreddin: Sultanın Fermanı	20	Final	
Ben Bu Cihana Sığmazam	68	Final	
Ben Gri	8	Final	Disney web series
Berlin Çekirdekçisi	11	Final	Short series
Bir Küçük Gün Işığı	36	Final	
Bir Peri Masalı	13	Final	
Bizden Olur Mu	10	Final	BluTV web series
Canım Annem	350	Final	daily series
Cezailer	6	Final	Gain web series
Çekiç ve Gül: Bir Behzat Ç. Hikayesi	30	No	Blutv web series
Çöp Adam	30	Final	
Darmaduman	9	Final	
Duy Beni	20	Final	
Dünyayla Benim Aramda	8	Final	Disney web series
Erkek Severse	26	Final	Bein connect/Digitürk series
Erşan Kuneri	16	Final	Netflix web series
Esaret	557	Final	daily series
Gecenin Ucunda	26	Final	
Gelsin Hayat Bildiği Gibi	41	Final	
Gizli Saklı	8	Final	
Gül Masalı	17	Final	
Gülümse Kaderine	5	Final	
Güzel Günler	26	Final	
Hacı Bayram Veli	26	Final	
Hakim	10	Final	
Hayaller ve Hayatlar	26	Final	Bein connect/Diğitürk series
Hayat Bugün	8	Final	
Hayatımın Şansı	9	Final	
Hicran	160	Final	daily series
İçimizdeki Ateş	5	Final	
İyilik	27	Final	
Kaçış	8	Final	Disney web series
Kadere Karşı	39	Final	daily series
Kan Çiçekleri	434	Final	daily series
Kara Tahta	20	Final	
Kasaba Doktoru	32	Final	
Kıyma	29	Final	blutv web series
Kızılcık Şerbeti	147	No	
Konteyner Brothers “Hurdalık”	26	Final	Kanald web series
Kusursuz Kiracı	6	Final	
Kuş Uçuşu	24	Final	Netflix web series
Meta Aşk	8	Final	BluTV web series
Mezarlık	12	Final	Netflix film series
Mükemmel Eşleşme	13	Final	
Nasıl Fenomen Oldum	12	Final	Bein connect/Diğitürk series
O Kız	24	Final	
Oğlum	15	Final	
Midnight at the Pera Palace	16	Final	Netflix web series
Sadece Arkadaşız	20	Final	Exxen web series
Senden Daha Güzel	14	Final	
Seni Dinliyorum	10	Final	Exxen web series
Seni Kalbime Sakladım	7	Final	
Seversin	20	Final	
Sevmek Zamanı	5	Final	
Sıcak Kafa	8	Final	Netflix series
Sıfırıncı Gün	6	Final	
Sipahi	8	Final	
Son Nefesime Kadar	5	Final	
Toprak ile Fidan	100	Final	daily series
Tozluyaka	26	Final	
Tuzak	26	Final	
Wild Abandon	8	Final	Netflix web series
Üç Kız Kardeş	84	Final	
Var Bunlar	26	No	Bein connect web series
Yakamoz S-245	7	Final	Netflix web series
Yalı Çapkını	101	Final	
Yalnız Kurt	32	Final	
Yazgı	74	Final	daily series
Yürek Çıkmazı	28	Final	
Zeytin Ağacı	16	Final	Netflix series

== 2021 ==
2021
TV series	Episodes	Final	Note
50m2	8	Final	Netflix Series
Acans	10	Final	Blutv web series
Ada Masalı	25	Final	
Adım Başı Kafe	10	Final	Exxen web series
Akıncı	20	Final	
Alparslan: Büyük Selçuklu	61	Final	
Annemizi Saklarken	8	Final	
Love, Reason, Get Even	42	Final	
Aşkın Tarifi	13	Final	
Ayak İşleri	30	Final	Gain web series
Aziz	28	Final	
Baht Oyunu	17	Final	
Barbaros: Sword of the Mediterranean	32	Final	
Baş Belası	13	Final	
Benim Hayatım	6	Final	
Bir Yer Altı Sitcomu	10	Final	Exxen web series
Once Upon a Time in Cyprus	24	Final	
Bizi Ayıran Çizgi	5	Final	Gain web series
Bonkis	15	Final	Blutv web series
Mendirman Jaloliddin	7	Final	
Börü 2039	6	No	Blutv web series
Bunu Bi' Düşünün	8	Final	Blutv web series
Cam Tavanlar	8	Final	
Camdaki Kız	82	Final	
Destan	28	Final	
Diğital Sahne	10	Final	YouTube web theatre
Doğu	24	Final	Blutv web series
Duran	9	Final	Gain web series
Dümen	6	Final	YouTube web series
Dünya Hali	20	Final	
Dünyayı Kurtaran Kadın	5	Final	YouTube web short series
Eee Sonra	10	Final	YouTube web series
Elbet Bir Gün	6	Final	
Elkızı	13	Final	
Etkileyici	20	Final	Gain web series
Evlilik Hakkında Her Şey	33	Final	
Ex Aşkım	24	Final	Gain web series
Fatma	6	Final	Netflix Series
Fandom	26	Final	Bein connect / Digiturk web series
Gibi	67	No	Exxen web series
Girift	13	Final	Kanal D web series
Hamlet	7	Final	Gain web series
Hiç	8	Final	Blutv web series
Hükümsüz	10	Final	Exxen web series
Kaderimin Oyunu	26	Final	
Kağıt Ev	8	Final	
Kahraman Babam	8	Final	
Kakao ve Süt	12	Final	Blutv web animated series
Kalp Yarası	32	Final	
Kanunsuz Topraklar	16	Final	
Kardeşlerim	132	Final	
Kazara Aşk	13	Final	
Kırık Hayatlar	100	Final	daily series
Kolej: Katil Kim	6	Final	YouTube web series
The Club	20	Final	Netflix series
Leyla and Mecnun	40	Final	Exxen web series
İçimizden Biri	6	Final	
İkimizin Sırrı	10	Final	
İlginç Bazı Olaylar	20	Final	Exxen web series
İlk ve Son	14	No	Blutv web series
İşte Bu Benim Masalım	8	Final	Exxen web musical series
Maraşlı	26	Final	
Masal Şatosu: Peri Hırsızı	16	Final	Blutv web series
Masumiyet	13	Final	
Mavera	26	Final	
Metot	4	Final	Gain web mini series
Misafir	5	Final	
N Kuşağı	10	Final	Youtube web series
Olağan Şüpheliler	10	Final	Exxen web series
Oluversin Gari	6	Final	TV film series
Orta! Kafa! Aşk!	20	Final	Gain web series
Öğrenci Evi	10	Final	Exxen web series
Ölüm Zamanı	8	Final	Exxen web series
Özelden Yürüyenler	26	Final	Gain web series
Podacto Stüdyo	8	Final	Blutv web performance series
Renkli Rüyalar Oteli	1	Final	Blutv web reality series
Saklı	10	Final	Blutv web series
Sana Söz	7	Final	
Seni Çok Bekledim	13	Final	
Senkron	6	Final	Gain web series
Sesli Güldüm	20	Final	Exxen web kids theatre
Seyyar	10	Final	Puhutv web series
Sihirli Annem	30	Final	Exxen web series
Son Yaz	26	Final	
Süper 1 Takım	39	No	Exxen web animation sitcom
Şeref Bey	10	Final	Exxen web series
Terapist	7	Final	Gain web short series
Teşkilat	194	No	
Tolgshow: Filtresiz	20	Final	Exxen web improvisation theatre
Tozkoparan: İskender	46	Final	
Uzak Şehrin Masalı	5	Final	
Üç Kuruş	28	Final	
Vahşi Şeyler	8	Final	Exxen web series
Yalancı	10	Final	
Yalancılar ve Mumları	5	Final	
Family Secrets	95	Final	
Yeşilçam	20	Final	Blutv web series
Yetiş Zeynep	20	Final	Exxen web series

== 2020 ==
2020
TV series	Episodes	Final	Note
10 Bin Adım	20	Final	Gain web short series
Acemi Anneler	165	Final	daily series
Aile Şirketi	39	Final	beIN CONNECT series
Akrep	26	Final	
Alef	16	Final	blutv web series
Alev Alev	28	Final	
Aptal Çocuklar	8	Final	YouTube web series
Arıza	30	Final	
Love 101	16	Final	Netflix web series
Babam Çok Değişti	4	Final	
Babil	20	Final	
Baraj	39	Final	
Bay Yanlış	14	Final	
Bir Annenin Günahı	5	Final	
Ethos	12		Netflix Series
Çatı Katı Aşk	16	Final	
Çıplak	17	Final	blutv mini web series
Çocukluk	11	Final	
Emanet	805	Final	daily series
Ev Yapımı	13	Final	
Galiçya İşgal Altında	6	Final	YouTube short web series
Gel Dese Aşk	4	Final	
Gençliğim Eyvah	17	Final	
Gönül Dağı	232	No	
Gün On4	10	Final	puhutv web short series
Hizmetçiler	3	Final	
İyi Günde Kötü Günde	6	Final	
Kafa Doktoru	9	Final	Vodafone TV - web series
Kefaret	29	Final	
Kırmızı Oda	61	Final	
Kuşlarla Yolculuk	30	Final	
Maria ile Mustafa	17	Final	
Masumlar Apartmanı	71	Final	
Menajerimi Ara	45	Final	
Netleşme	3	Final	YouTube web series
Öğretmen	9	Final	
Pes Artık	9	Final	YouTube web series
Ramo	40	Final	
Rise of Empires: Ottoman	12	Final	Netflix docudrama series
Sadakatsiz	60	Final	
Saygı	16	Final	blutv web series
Sen Çal Kapımı	52	Final	
Sokağın Çocukları	55	Final	blutv web series
Sol Yanım	12	Final	
Solucan	6	Final	YouTube web series
Şaşkın Bakkal 216	4	Final	
Şeref Sözü	4	Final	
Tövbeler Olsun	32	Final	
Tutunamayanlar	19	Final	
Türkan Hanım'ın Konağı	193	Final	daily series
Uyanın da Balığa Çıkalım	25	Final	YouTube web series
Uyanış: Büyük Selçuklu	34	Final	
Ya İstiklal Ya Ölüm	12	Final	mini series
Yarım Kalan Aşklar	8	Final	Blu TV web series
Yeni Hayat	9	Final	
Zemheri	10	Final	
Zümrüdüanka	26	Final	

== 2019 ==
2019
TV series	Episodes	Final	Note
4n1k Yeni Başlangıçlar	13	Final	Foxplay web series
Afili Aşk	38	Final	
Aşk Ağlatır	16	Final	
The Gift	24	Final	Netflix web series
Aynen Aynen	43	Final	YouTube web short series + blutv
Azize	6	Final	
Baharı Beklerken	100	Final	daily series
Behzat Ç. Bir Ankara Polisiyesi	9	Final	blutv web series
Benim Adım Melek	66	Final	
Benim Tatlı Yalanım	28	Final	
Bir Aile Hikayesi	18	Final	
Canevim	17	Final	
Çocuk	18	Final	
Çok Güzel Hareketler Bunlar 2	205	No	Theatre
Dengi Dengine	5	Final	mini series
Doğduğun Ev Kaderindir	43	Final	
Ferhat İle Şirin	6	Final	
Gorbi	13	Final	Foxplay web series
Güvercin	16	Final	
Halka	19	Final	
Hekimoğlu	51	Final	
Hercai	69	Final	
Her Yerde Sen	23	Final	
İçten Sesler Korosu	5	Final	YouTube web short series
İncir Ağacı	140	Final	daily series
Kardeş Çocukları	21	Final	
Kimse Bilmez	27	Final	
Kurşun	7	Final	
Kuruluş: Osman	194	Final	
Kuzey Yıldızı: İlk Aşk	64	Final	
Kuzgun	21	Final	
Leke	9	Final	
Mucize Doktor	64	Final	
Nöbet	8	Final	
Şampiyon	34	Final	
Sefirin Kızı	52	Final	
Seksenler	427	Final	daily series
Sevdim Seni Bir Kere	154	Final	daily series
Sevgili Geçmiş	8	Final	
Tek Yürek	22	Final	
Vurgun	6	Final	
Vuslat	44	Final	
Yaralı Kuşlar	165	Final	daily series
Yemin	503	Final	daily series
Yüzleşme	4	Final	
Zalim İstanbul	39	Final	
Zengin ve Yoksul	8	Final	

== 2018 ==
2018
TV series	Episodes	Final	Note
4n1k İlk Aşk	12	Final	
8. Gün	6	Final	
Acayip Tipler	6	Final	theatre
Adı: Zehra	14	Final	
Ağlama Anne	13	Final	
Alija	6	Final	mini series
Avlu	44	Final	
Babamın Günahları	4	Final	
Bartu Ben	10	Final	Blutv- web mini series
Beni Bırakma	630	Final	daily series
Bir Deli Rüzgar	6	Final	
Bir Litre Gözyaşı	15	Final	
Bir Mucize Olsun	3	Final	
Bir Umut Yeter	6	Final	
Bir Zamanlar Çukurova	141	Final	
Bozkır	18	Final	Blutv- web series
Wolf	6	Final	mini series
Can Kırıkları	4	Final	
Çarpışma	24	Final	
Darısı Başımıza	5	Final	
Dip	8	Final	Puhutv-web mini series
Dudullu Postası	12	Final	Blutv-web mini series
Ege'nin Hamsisi	23	Final	
Elimi Bırakma	59	Final	
Erkenci Kuş	51	Final	
Eşik	10	Final	Instagram series
Gülizar	10	Final	
Gülperi	30	Final	
The Protector	32	Final	Netflix- web series
Hıçkırık	50	Final	daily series
İkizler Memo-Can	25	Final	
İnsanlık Suçu	8	Final	
Jet Sosyete	59	Final	TV series + Puhutv web series
Kalbimin Sultanı	8	Final	
Kanaga	13	Final	YouTube - web series
Keşke Hiç Büyümeseydik	4	Final	
Kızım	34	Final	
Koca Koca Yalanlar	12	Final	
Kocaman Ailem	8	Final	
Masum Değiliz	6	Final	
Mehmetçik: Kutlu Zafer	14	Final	
Mehmetçik: Kut'ül-Amare	19	Final	
Mehmed Bir Cihan Fatihi	6	Final	
Meleklerin Aşkı	11	Final	
Muhteşem İkili	12	Final	
Nefes Nefese	10	Final	
Sen Anlat Karadeniz	64	Final	
Servet	4	Final	
Şahin Tepesi	6	Final	
Şahsiyet	12	Final	Puhutv-web mini series
Tam Kafadan	6	Final	YouTube web series
Tehlikeli Karım	6	Final	
Tolgshow	26	Final	Improvisational theatre
Tufa	3	Final	YouTube - web series
Tozkoparan	55	Final	
Yasak Elma	177	Final	
Immortals	8	Final	Blutv-web mini series
Yuvamdaki Düşman	6	Final	

== 2017 ==
2017
TV series	Episodes	Final	Note
7 Yüz	7	Final	Blutv-web mini series
Adı Efsane	29	Final	
Aslan Ailem	31	Final	
Aşk ve Gurur	6	Final	
Ateşböceği	17	Final	
Badem Şekeri	5	Final	TV movie series
Bahtiyar Ölmez	19	Final	
Bir Deli Sevda	4	Final	
Bizim Hikaye	70	Final	
Bu Sayılmaz	3	Final	
Bu Şehir Arkandan Gelecek	20	Final	
Cennet'in Gözyaşları	36	Final	
Çalınmış Hayatlar	3	Final	Blutv-web documentary drama
Çember	11	Final	TV movie series
Çoban Yıldızı	17	Final	
Çocuklar Duymasın	76	Final	
Çukur	131	Final	
Dayan Yüreğim	13	Final	
Deli Gönül	10	Final	
Dolunay	26	Final	
Dostlar Mahallesi	4	Final	
Esaretim Sensin	55	Final	daily series
Evlat Kokusu	9	Final	
Mrs. Fazilet and Her Daughters	50	Final	
Fi	22	Final	Puhutv-web series
Görünen Adam	10	Final	YouTube mini series
Hayat Sırları	11	Final	
Hayati ve Diğerleri	6	Final	
Hile	24	Final	YouTube web series
İçimdeki Fırtına	6	Final	
İki Yalancı	9	Final	
İkisini de Sevdim	3	Final	
İsimsizler	27	Final	
İstanbullu Gelin	87	Final	
Kadın	81	Final	
Kalk Gidelim	135	Final	
Kalp Atışı	28	Final	
Kanatsız Kuşlar	46	Final	
Kara Yazı	6	Final	
Kayıtdışı	8	Final	
Kırlangıç Fırtınası	7	Final	
Kısa Kısa Aşk	19	Final	netd short web series
Kızlarım İçin	13	Final	
Klavye Delikanlıları	8	Final	
Komşular	25	Final	daily series
Lise Devriyesi	11	Final	
Masum	8	Final	Blutv-web mini series
Meryem	30	Final	
Nerdesin Birader	4	Final	
Ölene Kadar	13	Final	
Payitaht: Abdülhamid	154	Final	
Rüya	10	Final	
Saatli İlker Ayrık Takvimi	69	Final	Sketch
Sahipli	10	Final	Blutv-web mini series
Savaşçı	109	Final	
Seni Kimler Aldı	10	Final	
Sevda'nın Bahçesi	4	Final	
Seven Ne Yapmaz	11	Final	
Siyah Beyaz Aşk	32	Final	
Siyah İnci	20	Final	
Son Destan	5	Final	mini series
Söz	84	Final	
Şevkat Yerimdar	44	Final	
Tutsak	9	Final	
Türk Malı	8	Final	
Ufak Tefek Cinayetler	45	Final	
Ver Elini Aşk	11	Final	
Yalaza	20	Final	
Yara Bandı	13	Final	YouTube series
Yeni Gelin	63	Final	
Yıldızlar Şahidim	4	Final	
Yüz Yüze	2	Final	

== 2016 ==
2016
TV series	Episodes	Final	Note
46 Yok Olan	13	Final	
100 Yıllık Mühür	15	Final	mini series
Adını Sen Koy	397	Final	daily TV series
Aile İşi	13	Final	
Altınsoylar	3	Final	
Anne	33	Final	
Arkadaşlar İyidir	10	Final	
Aşk Laftan Anlamaz	31	Final	
Aşk ve Mavi	78	Final	
Aşk Yalanı Sever	7	Final	
Babam ve Ailesi	13	Final	
Bana Sevmeyi Anlat	22	Final	
Bodrum Masalı	42	Final	
Buyur Bi'De Burdan Bak	10	Final	theatre
Cesur ve Güzel	32	Final	
Cesur Yürek	21	Final	
Çifte Saadet	11	Final	
Çizgiyi Geç	10	Final	Instagram series
Familya	10	Final	
Gecenin Kraliçesi	15	Final	
Göç Zamanı	15	Final	
Güldüy Güldüy Çocuk	31	Final	Kid theatre
Gülümse Yeter	24	Final	
Hangimiz Sevmedik	40	Final	
Hanım Köylü	13	Final	
Hayat Bazen Tatlıdır	26	Final	
Hayat Sevince Güzel	15	Final	
Hayat Şarkısı	57	Final	
Hayatımın Aşkı	17	Final	
İçerde	39	Final	
İlişki Durumu: Evli	4	Final	
İstanbul Sokakları	9	Final	
Kaçın Kurası	4	Final	
Kalbim Yangın Yeri	5	Final	
Kalbimdeki Deniz	60	Final	
Kanıt Ateş Üstünde	8	Final	
Kehribar	15	Final	
Kış Güneşi	18	Final	
Kördüğüm	31	Final	
Kral Şakir	364	Final	Animated Sitcom
Melek ile Serhat	5	Final	mini web series
Müdür Ne'aptın?	13	Final	Improvisational theatre
No 309	65	Final	
N'olur Ayrılalım	5	Final	
Oyunbozan	5	Final	
Özcan Show	111	Final	YouTube+Exxen animation series
Rengarenk	7	Final	
Rüzgarın Kalbi	9	Final	
Seddülbahir 32 Saat	4	Final	mini TV series
Sevda Kuşun Kanadında	31	Final	
Seviyor Sevmiyor	28	Final	
Sıfır Bir	43	Final	YouTube/Blutv series
Şahane Damat	8	Final	
Tatlı İntikam	30	Final	
Umuda Kelepçe Vurulmaz	15	Final	
Vatanım Sensin	59	Final	
Yüksek Sosyete	26	Final	

== 2015 ==
2015
TV series	Episodes	Final
Acı Aşk	13	Final
Acil Aşk Aranıyor	24	Final
Adı Mutluluk	17	Final
Analar ve Anneler	9	Final
Asla Vazgeçmem	59	Final
Aşk Yeniden	59	Final
Ayrılsak da Beraberiz	7	Final
Baba Candır	66	Final
Bana Baba Dedi	7	Final
Bedel	20	Final
Beş Kardeş	13	Final
Beyaz Yalan	6	Final
Bir Deniz Hikayesi	8	Final
Bir Modern Habil Kabil Hikayesi	2	Final
Büyük Sürgün Kafkasya	4	mini TV series
Çınarin Gölgesinde	70	Final
Çilek Kokusu	23	Final
Eşkıya Dünyaya Hükümdar Olmaz	199	Final
Eve Dönüş	22	Final
Evli ve Öfkeli	30	Final
Fabrika Kızı	4	Final
Gamsız Hayat	5	Final
Güne Bakan	5	Final
Güneşin Kızları	39	Final
Hatırla Gönül	13	Final
Hayat Mucizelere Gebe	7	Final
Heredot Cevdet Saati	120	Daily TV series
İlişki Durumu: Karışık	40	Final
İnadına Aşk	32	Final
Kalbim Egede Kaldı	16	Final
Kara Ekmek	37	Final
Kara Kutu	7	Final
Kara Sevda	74	Final
Kırgın Çiçekler	113	Final
Kiralık Aşk	69	Final
Maral	17	Final
Mayıs Kraliçesi	11	Final
Milat	10	Final
Muhteşem Yüzyıl: Kösem	60	Final
Mutlu Ol yeter	7	Final
Ne Münasabet	11	Final
Poyraz Karayel	82	Final
Racon	4	Final
Sen Benimsin	13	Final
Serçe Sarayı	13	Final
Sevda Alabora	4	Final
Son Çıkış	17	Final
Şehrin Melekleri	5	Final
Tatlı Küçük Yalancılar	13	Final
Tutar Mı Tutar	4	Final
Yazın Öyküsü	13	Final
Yeter	40	Final
Yunus Emre: Aşkın Yolculuğu	44	Final
Zeyrek ile Çeyrek	29	mini TV series

== 2014 ==
2014
TV series	Episodes	Note
1 Erkek 1 Kadın 2 Çocuk	41	Final
Ağlatan Dans	5	Final
Ah Neriman	4	Final
Alın Yazım	240	daily TV series
Analı Oğullu	4	Final
Ankaranın Dikmeni	25	Final
Aşkın Kanunu	10	Final
Asayiş Berkkemal	6	Final
Aşktan Kaçılmaz	11	Final
Bana Artık Hicran De	4	Final
Benim Adım Gültepe	8	Final
Beyaz Karanfil	6	Final
Bir Yusuf Masalı	21	Final
Boynu Bükükler	7	Final
Cinayet	5	Final
Çılgın Dershane Üniversitede	5	Final
Çırağan Baskını	4	mini TV series
Diğer Yarım	23	Final
Diriliş: Ertuğrul	150	Final
Düşler ve Umutlar	5	Final
Elif	940	daily TV series
Emanet	10	Final
Ezra	2	Final
Filinta	56	Final
Gölgedekiler	6	Final
Gönül	28	Final
Güllerin Savaşı	68	Final
Günahkar	7	Final
Güzel Köylü	52	Final
Hatasız Kul Olmaz	4	Final
Hayat Ağacı	6	Final
Hayat Yolunda	13	Final
Her Sevda Bir Veda	4	Final
Hiyanet Sarmalı	35	Final
Hom ofis	4	Final
Kaçak Gelinler	29	Final
Kaderimin Yazıldığı Gün	50	Final
Kadim Dostum	9	Final
Kalp Hırsızı	7	Final
Kara Para Aşk	54	Final
Kardeş Payı	35	Final
Kertenkele	85	Final
Kızılelma	28	Final
Kiraz Mevsimi	59	Final
Kocamın Ailesi	57	Final
Kurt Seyit ve Şura	21	Final
Küçük Ağa	50	Final
Mihrap Yerinde	3	Final
Ne Diyoosun	3	Final
Not Defteri	13	Final
O Hayat Benim	131	Final
Otel Divane	4	Final
Paramparça	97	Final
Paşa Gönlüm	3	Final
Reaksiyon	13	Final
Roman Havası	6	Final
Ruhumun Aynası	7	Final
Sil Baştan	9	Final
Sungurlar	39	Final
Şeref Meselesi	26	Final
Şimdi Onlar Düşünsün	18	Final
Tanıklar	2	Final
Ulan İstanbul	39	Final
Urfalıyam Ezelden	11	Final
Üç Arkadaş	4	Final
Yasak	9	Final
Yedi Güzel Adam	39	Final
Yedikule Hayat Yokuşu	30	mini TV series
Yeşil Deniz	75	Final
Yetim Gönüller	16	Final
Yılanların Öcü	49	Final
Zeytin Tepesi	7	Final

== 2013 ==
2013
TV series	Episodes	Note
20 Dakika	25	
Arkadaşım Hoşgeldin	29	Improvisational theatre
A.Ş.K	13	
Adını Kalbime Yazdım	16	
Aldırma Gönül	9	
Ali Ayşe'yi Seviyor	19	
Altındağlı	2	
Aramızda Kalsın	52	
Aşk Ekmek Hayeller	10	
Aşk Emek İster	11	
Babam Sınıfta Kaldı	23	
Bebek İşi	34	
Ben de Özledim	13	
Beni Böyle Sev	89	
Ben Onu Çok Sevdim	15	
Benim Hala Umudum Var	33	
Bir Aşk Hikayesi	36	
Bir Yastıkta	14	
Bizim OKul	7	
Bugünün Saraylısı	36	
Cesur Hemşire	9	
Çalıkuşu	30	
Doksanlar	43	
Emret Komutanım Yeniden	30	
En Uzun Yüzyıl	1	
Eski Hikaye	17	
Evlilik Okulu	8	
Fatih	5	
Fatih Harbiye	50	
Fırıldak Ailesi	80	animated sitcom
Firuze	5	
Galip Derviş	56	
Güldür Güldür Show	406	theatre/continues
Gönül Hırsızı	19	
Görüş Günü Kadınları	10	
Gurbette Aşk Bir Yastıkta	26	
Güneşi Beklerken	54	
Güzel Çirkin	13	
Her Şey Yolunda	23	
Hıyanet Sarmalı	35	
İnadına Yaşamak	6	
İntikam	44	
Kaçak	52	
Kahireli Palas	30	
Karagül	125	
Kayıp	18	
Küçük Gelin	92	
Medcezir	77	
Merhamet	44	
Nerde O Yeminle	8	
Osmanlı Tokadı	37	
Osmanlı'da Derin Devlet	13	
Otisabi	13	
Ötesiz İnsanlar	72	
Saklı Kalan	1	
Salih Kuşu	10	
Sana Bir Sır Vereceğim	29	
Sevdaluk	20	
Tatar Ramazan	26	
Tozlu Yollar	7	
Vicdan	7	
Yağmurdan Kaçarken	8	
Yüksek Giriş	6	

== 2012 ==
2012
TV series	Episodes	Note
Acayip Hikayeler	11	
Ağır Roman Yeni Dünya	10	
Alev Alev	16	
Annem Uyurken	8	
Araf Zamanı	29	
Aşk Kaç Beden Giyer	80	
Aşkın Halleri	10	
Babalar ve Evlatları	4	
Benim İçin Üzülme	55	
Bir Ferhat ile Şirin Hikayesi / Esir Şehrin Gözyaşları	5	
Bir Zamanlar Osmanlı: Kıyam	20	
Böyle Bitmesin	69	
Bulutların Ötesi	13	
Canım Benim	65	
Canımın İçi	50	
Çıplak Gerçak	16	
Dedemin Dolabı	15	
Dila Hanım	62	
Düşman Kardeşler	11	
Esir Sultan	5	
Eve Düşen Yıldırım	22	
Evlerden Biri	12	
Evvel Zaman Hikayesi	4	Mini TV series
Ha Babam Uzay	10	
Harem	32	
Hayatımın Rolü	19	
Hızır Ekip	53	
Huzur Sokağı	67	
İbreti Ailem	13	
İki Yaka Bir İstanbul	6	
İşler Güçler	41	
Kalbim Dört Mevsim	16	
Karadayı	115	
Kayıp Şehir	26	
Korkma	5	mini TV series
Koyu Kırmızı	13	
Kötü Yol	13	
Krem	24	
Kurt Kanunu	18	
Küçük Kıyamet	36	
Merhaba Hayat	13	
Nizama Adanmış Ruhlar	121	
Polis Hikayeleri	5	
Seksenler	228	
Son	25	mini TV series
Son Yaz Balkanlar 1912	4	
Sudan Çıkmış Balıklar	11	
Sultan	20	
Suskunlar	28	
Şubat	32	
Uçurum	24	
Ustura Kemal	14	
Veda	8	
Yalan Dünya	90	
Yol Ayrımı	28	
Zengin Kız Fakir Oğlan	130	
Zil Çalınca	40	Disney series

== 2011 ==
2011
TV series	Episodes	Note
Adım Bayram Bayram	2	
Adını Feriha Koydum	80	
Al Yazmalım	37	
Alemin Kralı	67	
Anneler ile Kızları	12	
Arka Sıradakiler Umut	33	
Aşağı Yukarı Yemişliler	10	
Avrupa Avrupa	91	
Ay Tutulması	13	
Babam İçin	23	
Babam Sağolsun	8	
Başrolde Aşk	25	
Beni Affet	1477	Daily TV series
Bir Çocuk Sevdim	39	
Bir Günah Gibi	5	
Bir Kadın Tanıdım	20	
Bir Ömür Yetmez	7	
Bizim Yenge	18	
Canan	28	
Canım Babam	11	
Cennetin Sırları	7	
Dedektif Memoli	12	
Derin Sular	116	Daily TV series
Dinle Sevgili	245	Daily TV series
Düz Adam	28	
En Son Ne Olur	4	
Farklı Boyut	39	
Firar	35	
Gol Olur	12	
Gün Akşam Oldu	10	
Hayat Devam Ediyor	46	
Hayata Beş Kala	35	
Herşeye Rağmen	9	
Huzurum Kalmadı	5	
İffet	40	
İstanbul Hatırası	20	
İstanbul'un Altınları	16	
İzmir Çetesi	24	
Kalbim Seni Seçti	23	
Karakol	8	
Karımın Dediği Dedik Çaldığı Kontrobas	4	
Kayıp Aranıyor	5	
Keşanlı Ali Destanı	20	
Kız Annesi	4	
Kolej Günlüğü	7	
Kurşun Bilal	10	
Kuzey Güney	80	
Küçük Hanımefendi	40	
Leyla and Mecnun	104	
Mavi Kelebekler	26	
Mazi Kalbimde Yaradır	26	
Mor Menekşeler	29 and black	
Muck	8	
Muhteşem Yüzyıl	139	
Müziklerin Efendisi	2	
Naber Bacanak	7	
Nuri	19	
Pis Yedili	105	
Reis	9	
Sen de Gitme	54	
Seni Bana Yazmışlar	11	
Sensiz Olmaz	7	
Sırat	5	
Sudan Sebepler	2	
Şahin ve Çetesi	76	
Sihirli Annem	109	
Şüphe	6	
Tek Başımıza	8	
Tövbeler Tövbesi	37	
Umutsuz Ev Kadınları	154	
Üsküdar'a Giderken	13	
Ve İnsan Aldandı Bitmeyen Hikaye	11	
Yalancı Bahar	9	
Yamak Ahmet	39	
Yeniden Başla	36	
Yıldız Masalı	12	
Yıllar Sonra	6	
Zehirli Sarmaşık	12	

== 2010 ==
2010
TV series	Episodes	Note
Al Gülüm Ver Gülüm	3	
Aşk ve Ceza	62	
Ateşe Yürümek	4	
Behzat Ç. Bir Ankara Polisiyesi	96	
Bitmeyen Şarkı	32	
Cumaya Kalsa	12	
Cümbür Cemaat Aile	15	
Çakıl Taşları	17	
Çete	5	
Deli Saraylı	11	
Dürüyenin Güğümleri	48	
Elde Var Hayat	72	
Farklı Desenler	124	
Fatmagül'ün Suçu Ne?	80	
Gönül Ferman Dinlemiyor	2	
Gönülçelen	56	
Güneydoğudan Öyküler Önce Vatan	19	
Güz Gülleri	29	
Halil İbrahim Sofrası	39	
Hanımeli Sokağı	29	
İhanet	7	
Kader Çizgisi	15	
Kadınları Anlama Kılavuzu	39	
Kalbimin Sahibi	15	
Kalp Ağrısı	14	
Kanıt	100	
Karadağlar	40	
Keskin Bıçak	8	
Kılıç Günü	8	
Kızım Nerede?	26	
Kirli Beyaz	6	
Küçük Sırlar	55	
Küstüm Çiçeği	13	
Lale Devri	135	
Mükemmel Çift	8	
Öğretmen Kemal	18	
Öyle Bir Geçer Zaman ki	120	
Sensiz Yaşamam	13	
Sevgi Bağlayınca	2	
Sınıf 2010	170	Daily TV series
Şefkat Tepe	158	
Şen Yuva	20	
Türk Malı	32	
Türkan	26	
Umut Yolcuları	13	
Yahşi Cazibe	93	
Yer Gök Aşk	122	
Yerden Yüksek	48	

== 2009 ==
2009
TV series	Episodes	Note
Acemi Müezzin	4	
Acil Servis	8	
Açık Mutfak	5	
Ah Kalbim	26	
Aile Reisi	18	
Aile Saadeti	6	
Alayına İsyan	5	
Altın Kızlar	5	
Aşk Bir Hayal	75	
Aynadaki Düşman	13	
Ayrılık	1	
Balkan Düğünü	6	
Bir Bulut Olsam	29	
Bu Kalp Seni Unutur mu?	17	
Cam Kırıkları	13	
Canını Sevdiğimin İstanbulu	2	
Çılgın Kanal	2	
Çocukluk Günleri	2	
Deniz Yıldızı	1287	Daily series
Dördüncü Osman	38	
Es-Es	21	
Ey Aşk Nerdesin?	6	
Ezel	71	
Geniş Aile	108	
Haneler	52	
Hanımın Çiftliği	70	
Hesaplaşma	1	
Hicran Yarası	58	
İstanbul Çocukları	1	
Kahramanlar	10	
Kahve Bahane	16	
Kandıramazsın Beni	1	
Kapadokya Düşleri	13	
Kapalıçarşı	38	
Kasaba	20	
Kış Masalı	11	
Kız Kaçıran	4	
Koca Kafalarla Baba Haber Bülteni	894	animated sitcom
Komşu Köyün Delisi	2	
Kurban	30	mini TV series
Kül ve Ateş	9	
Makber	6	
Manyak Dükkanı	2	
Maskeli Balo	4	
M.A.T	6	
Melekler Korusun	73	
Nefes	4	
Ömre Bedel	71	
Papatyam	121	
Ramazan Güzeldir	30	
Ritmini Arayan Kalpler	30	
Sağlık Olsun	4	
Sakarya Fırat	151	
Samanyolu	29	
Sarı Sarı Liralar	1	
Sıkı Dostlar	1	
Teyzanne	6	
Unutulmaz	90	
Uygun Adım Aşk	10	
Yalancısın Sen	10	
Yapma Diyorum	3	
Yeni Baştan	5	
Zoraki Başkan	47	

== 2008 ==
2008
TV series	Episodes	Note
1 Erkek 1 Kadın	416	
Adanalı	79	
Akasya Durağı	174	
Aman Annem Görmesin	3	
Aşk Yakar	21	
Aşk-ı Memnu	79	
Aşkım Aşkım	26	
Ateş ve Barut	5	
Ay Işığı	8	
Baba Ocağı	53	
Babam Adam Olacak	6	
Bahar Dalları	30	
Benim Annem Bir Melek	64	
Bir Göçmen Kuştu O	1	
Bir Varmış Bir Yokmuş	4	
Canım Ailem	63	
Cennetin Çocukları	3	
Cesaretin Var Mı Aşka	8	
Çemberin Dışında		
Çok Güzel Hareketler Bunlar	90	Theatre
Dalgakıran	4	
Dantel	2	
Dedektif Biraderler	13	
Derdest	10	
Derman	6	
Doğruluk Ekseni	36	
Doludizgin Yıllar	47	
Dur Yolcu	13	
Düğün Şarkıcısı	22	
Ece	26	
Elif	15	
Emret Komutanım	80	
Eyvah Halam	5	
Gazi	19	
Gece Gündüz	29	
Gece Sesleri	26	
Geç Gelen Bahar	3	
Gonca Karanfil	2	
Görgüsüzler	6	
Gurbet Kuşları	4	
Güldünya	5	
Hayat Güzeldir	4	
Hemşire Meri	2	
Hepimiz Birimiz İçin	5	
Her Halimle Sev Beni	3	Mini TV series
Hicran	4	
İpsiz Recep	26	
İyi Uçuşlar	5	
İyilik Kervanı	9	
Kalpsiz Adam	10	
Karamel	3	
Kardelen	6	
Kayıp Prenses	29	
Kendi Okulumuza Doğru	32	
Kırmızı Işık	13	
Kız Takımı	11	
Kolay Gelsin	4	
Kollama	134	
Küçük Kadınlar	120	
Limon Ağacı	10	
Memur Muzaffer	4	
Mert ile Gert	26	
Milyonda Bir	7	
Nerede Kalmıştık	4	
Ölüm Çiçekleri-Saraybosna	4	
Paramparça Aşklar	5	
Pars: Narkoterör	23	
Peri Masalı	4	
Prenses Perfinya	28	
Proje 13	12	
Pulsar	17	
Sen Harikasın	132	
Serçe	8	
Servet Avcısı	6	
Sınıf	6	
Son Ağa	23	
Son Bahar	46	
Süper Babaanne	17	
Sürgün Hayatlar	13	
Talih Kuşu	5	
Unutma Beni	1702	daily series
Üvey Aile	5	
Vurgun	2	
Yaban Gülü	15	
Yalancı Romantik	66	
Yol Arkadaşım	41	

== 2007 ==
2007
TV series	Episodes	Note
Annem	64	
Arka Sıradakiler	193	
Asi	71	
Aşk Eski Bir Yalan	4	
Aşk Kapıyı Çalınca	8	
Ayda	4	
Ayrılık	6	
Baba Oluyorum		
Benden Baba Olmaz	16	
Bez Bebek	101	
Bıçak Sırtı	30	
Cumhur Cemaat	15	
Çatı Katı		
Çok Özel Tim / Ç.Ö.T.	3	
Dağlar Delisi	5	
Dede Korkut Hikayeleri		
Dudaktan Kalbe	75	
Duvar	10	
Düş Yakamdan		
Eksik Etek	3	
El Gibi	8	
Elif'in Günlüğü	4	
Elveda Derken	51	
Elveda Rumeli	83	
Ertelenmiş Hayatlar	4	
Eşref Saati	39	
Evimin Erkeği	16	
Fedai	8	
Fesupanallah	8	
Fikrimin İnce Gülü	8	
Gemilerde Talim Var	4	
Genco	51	
Gençlik Başımda Duman		
Gönül Salıncağı	15	
Güzel Günler		
Hakkını Helal Et	37	
Hayal ve Gerçek	9	
Hayat Apartmanı	5	
Hayat Kavgam		
Hepsi 1	51	
Hırçın Kız	2	
İki Yabancı	2	
Kader	9	
Kaptan	3	
Kara Duvak	13	
Kara İnci	7	
Kara Yılan	18	
Kartallar Yüksek Uçar	3	
Kavak Yelleri	170	
Kelebek Çıkmazı	6	
Kısmetim Otel	5	
Kod Adı: Kaos	10	
Komedi Dükkanı	101	Improvisational theatre
Komiser Nevzat - Kanun Namına	4	
Korkusuzlar	4	
Kurtlar Vadisi Pusu	300	
Kurtlar Vadisi Terör	2	
Kuzey Rüzgarı	20	
Leylan	5	
Mahşer	4	
Menekşe ile Halil	36	
Nazlı Yarim	6	
Oğlum İçin	1	
OKS Anneleri	6	
Oyun Bitti	7	
Parmaklıklar Ardında	106	
Pusat	13	
Sana Mecburum	11	
Sardunya Sokak	7	
Senden Başka	19	
Senin Uğruna		
Sessiz Fırtına	18	
Sessiz Gemiler	20	
Sevgili Dünürüm	21	
Sır Gibi	5	
Sinekli Bakkal	5	
Son Tercih	7	
Şölen	1	
Tatlı Bela Fadime	36	
Tek Türkiye	149	
Tılsım Adası	1	
Üç Tatlı Cadı	13	
Vatan Sağolsun	4	
Vazgeç Gönlüm	47	
Yağmurdan Sonra	39	
Yalan Dünya	17	
Yaralı Yürek	16	
Yasak Elma	3	
Yemin	90	
Yersiz Yurtsuz	18	
Yıldızlar Savaşı	4	
Zeliha'nın Gözleri	8	
Zoraki Koca	26	

== 2006 ==
2006
TV series	Episodes	Note
Acemi Cadı	58	
Adak	10	
Affedilmeyen	5	
Ah Polis Olsam	9	
Ahh İstanbul	10	
Anadolu Kaplanı	8	
Arka Sokaklar	751	
Aşk Yolu	13	
Azap yolu	15	
Bebeğim	24	
Binbir Gece	90	
Candan Öte	24	
Cemil oldu Jimmy		
Cemile	1	
Deli Dolu	10	
Dicle	5	
Doktorlar	97	
Eksi 18	6	
Erkekler Ağlamaz	11	
Erkeksen Seyret		
Esir Kalpler	4	
Ezo Gelin	59	
Felek Ne Demek		
Fırtına	48	
Fırtınalı Aşk	31	
Geniş Zamanlar	22	
Gizli Patron	2	
Gönül	7	
Gönül Yokuşu		
Gözyaşı Çetesi		
Güldünya	5	
Gülpare	11	
Hasret	8	
Hatırla Sevgili	68	
Hayat Türküsü	65	
Hayat Sana Feda	10	
Hisarbuselik	13	
İki Aile	93	
İlk Aşkım		
İmkansız Aşk	4	
İşte Benim	2	
Kadın Severse	6	
Karagümrük Yanıyor	15	
Karınca Yuvası	10	
Kaybolan Yıllar	49	
Kınalı Kuzular	13	
Kız Babası		
Kızlar Yurdu	24	
Kod Adı Kaos	10	
Köprü	65	
Kuş Dili	12	
Maçolar	5	
Meçhule Gidenler	5	
Pertev Beyin Üç Kızı		
Rüya Gibi	4	
Rüyalarda Buluşuruz	8	
Sağır Oda	34	
Sahte Prenses	18	
Selena	104	
Sev Kardeşim	38	
Sevda Çiçeği	24	
Sıla	79	
Sırça Köşk	4	
Şöret Okulu		
Tarık ve Diğerleri	30	
Taşların Sırrı	6	
Tutkunum Sana		
Ümit Milli	9	
Yalancı Yarim	49	
Yaprak Dökümü	174	
Yaşanmış Şehir Hikayeleri	7	
Yeşeren Düşler	66	

== 2000–2005 ==
2000–2005 classics
TV series	Episodes	Note
Avrupa Yakası	190	Final
Kurtlar Vadisi	97	Final
Yeditepe İstanbul	47	Final
Çemberimde Gül Oya	40	Final
Koçum Benim	47	Final
Kadın İsterse	52	Final
Asmalı Konak	54	Final
Haziran Gecesi	62	Final
Ekmek Teknesi	106	Final
En Son Babalar Duyar	200	Final
Ayrılsak da Beraberiz	450	Final
Hırsız Polis	50	Final
Hayat Bilgisi	137	Final
İkinci Bahar	37	Final
Çocuklar Duymasın	456	Final
Yılan Hikayesi	90	Final
Belalı Baldız	34	Final
Evdeki Yabancı	55	Final
Acı Hayat	59	Final
Yabancı Damat	106	Final
Dadı	61	Final
Gümüş	100	Final
Gülbeyaz	26	Final
Ihlamurlar Altında	80	Final
Yarım Elma	55	Final
Deli Yürek	113	Final
İyi Aile Robotu	unknown	Final
Kırık Kanatlar	36	Final
Sahra	34	Final
Sıdıka	98	Final
Serseri	63	Final
Çapkın	17	Final
Davetsiz Misafir	27	Final
Kurşun Yarası	60	Final
Aşk Oyunu	47	Final
Aşka Sürgün	55	Final
Sihirli Annem	240	Final
Aliye	76	Final
Aşkım Aşkım	26	Final
Beyaz Gelincik	74	Final
Bir İstanbul Masalı	71	Final
Büyümüşte Küçülmüş	13	Final
Cennet Mahallesi	119	Final
Emret Komutanım	80	Final
Melekler Adası	76	Final
Omuz Omuza	34	Final
Ruhsar	108	Final
Kampüsistan	44	Final
Kınalı Kar	90	Final
Yusuf Yüzlü	unknown	Final
Lise Defteri	28	Final
Mavi Rüya	71	Final
Canım Kocacım	26	Final
Çarli	unknown	Final
Beşinci Boyut	140	Final
Çifte Bela	unknown	Final
Esir Şehrin Gözyaşları	unknown	Final
Hekimoğlu	unknown	Final
Ablam Böyle İstedi	unknown	Final
Ah Be İstanbul	unknown	Final
Hürrem Sultan	8	Final
Gurbet Kadını	75	Final
Küçük İbo	83	Final
Sultan Makamı	26	Final
Şubat Soğuğu	78	Final
Tatlı Hayat	106	Final
Yağmur Zamanı	57	Final
7 Numara	92	Final
Yeniden Çalıkuşu	7	Final
Yanık Koza	68	Final
Alacakaranlık	37	Final
Aslı ile Kerem	29	Final
Büyük Buluşma	155	Final
Berivan	64	Final
Bir Dilim Aşk	18	Final
Eyvah Babam	74	Final
Bizim Evin Halleri	1705	Final
Bütün Çocuklarım	unknown	Final
Büyük Yalan	69	Final
En İyi Arkadaşım	88	Final

== 1974–1999 ==
1974–1999 classics
TV series	Episodes	Note	Release Date
Ayrı Dünyalar	38		1998
Aşk-ı Memnu	6	Final	1975
Belene	4	Final	1989
Aysar'nın Zilleri		Final	1985
Yaprak Dökümü	7	Final	1988
Çalıkuşu	7	Final	1986
Kaynanalar	314	Final	1974–2005
Affet Bizi Hocam		Final	1998
Kanun Savaşcıları		Final	1996-1999
Kurtuluş - Harbiyeliler		Final	1997-2002
Fatih-i Harbiye		Final	1991
Perihan Abla	74	Final	1986–1988
Bizimkiler	465	Final	1989–2002
Mahallenin Muhtarları	332	Final	1992–2002
Ferhunde Hanımlar	1780	Final	1993–1999
Süper Baba	137	Final	1993–1997
Çiçek Taksi	367	Final	1995–2003
Bugünün Saraylısı	4	Final	1985
Küçük Ağa	8	Final	1984
Samanyolu	4	Final	1989
Dokuzuncu Harciye Koğuşu	4	Final	1985
Şaşıfelek Çıkmazı		Final	1999
Acımak	7	Final	1985
Ateşten Gömlek/Günler	4	Final	1987
Kuruntu Ailesi		Final	1998-1999
Kurtuluş	6	Final	1994
Gençler		Final	1989–1990
İstanbul		Final	1977
Türkmen Düğünü	3	Final	1983
Başka Olur Ağaların Düğünü	5	Final	1990
Uğurlugiller		Final	1997
Uzaylı Zekiye		Final	1997
Üç İstanbul		Final	1983
Dudaktan Kalbe		Final	1999-2000
Kartallar Yüksek Uçar		Final	1983
Sekiz Sütuna Manşet		Final	1979
Yarın Artık Bugündür		Final	1976
Mardin Münih Hattı	6	Final	1986
Çılgın Bediş		Final	1996-2001
Kara Melek	110	Final	1997-2000

== See also ==
- List of ended Turkish television series
