= List of ended Turkish television series =

This is a list of ended Turkish television series.

== Comedy ==
Title	Premiere	Finale	Seasons	Runtime	Notes
Acemi Cadı	7 July 2006	21 December 2007	2 seasons, 58 episodes	60 min.	
Avrupa Yakası	11 February 2004	24 June 2009	6 seasons, 190 episodes	73-90 min.	
Baskül Ailesi	28 April 1997	1 January 1998	1 season, 16 episodes	45 min.	
Belalı Baldız	11 September 2005	22 June 2006	1 season, 34 episodes	60 min.	
Çılgın Bediş	8 July 1996	3 March 2001	4 seasons, 70 episodes	90 min.	
Çiçek Taksi	27 September 1995	27 December 2003	7 seasons, 367 episodes	45 min.	
Çocuklar Duymasın	16 January 2002	11 April 2019	9 seasons, 464 episodes	120 min.	
Çok Güzel Hareketler Bunlar	26 June 2001	28 May 2008	5 seasons, 90 episodes	105 min.	
Dadı	5 January 2001	28 October 2002	3 seasons, 61 episodes	45 min.	
Doksanlar (tr)	26 June 2013	27 April 2014	1 season, 43 episodes	100-120 min.	
Geniş Aile	8 July 2009	18 November 2011	3 seasons, 108 episodes	90 min.	
Hayat Bilgisi	13 February 2003	16 June 2006	4 seasons, 137 episodes	60 min.	
İnce İnce Yasemince	3 May 1995	1 January 2011	12 seasons, 360 episodes	60 min.	
İşler Güçler	28 June 2012	4 June 2013	1 season, 41 episodes	75 min.	
Jet Sosyete	18 February 2018	6 May 2020	3 seasons, 56 episodes	51-133 min.	
Kaynanalar	23 September 1974	10 May 2004	22 seasons, 958 episodes	45 min.	
Kiraz Mevsimi	4 July 2014	28 November 2015	2 seasons, 59 episodes	90-115 min.	
Sıdıka	24 February 1997	2003	6 seasons, 98 episodes	45 min.	
Türk Malı	15 March 2010	27 September 2017	4 seasons, 41 episodes	125-155 min.	
Yabancı Damat	12 November 2004	15 June 2007	3 seasons, 80 episodes	80 min.	
Yahşi Cazibe	16 July 2010	16 June 2012	2 seasons, 93 episodes	90 min.	
Yalan Dünya	13 January 2012	19 November 2014	4 seasons, 90 episodes	120 min.	
Yarım Elma (tr)	2002	2004	2 seasons, 55 episodes	45 min.	

== Drama ==
Title	Premiere	Finale	Seasons	Runtime	Notes
Adanalı	7 November 2008	7 November 2010	3 seasons, 79 episodes	90 min.	
Adını Feriha Koydum	14 January 2011	29 June 2012	3 seasons, 80 episodes	120 min.	
Akasya Durağı	14 July 2008	1 September 2012	5 seasons, 174 episodes	90 min.	
Al Yazmalım	12 September 2011	5 June 2012	1 season, 37 episodes	60 min.	
Anne (Turkish TV series)	25 October 2016	20 June 2017	1 season, 33 episodes	120 min.	
Arka Sıradakiler	30 September 2007	10 June 2012	6 seasons, 193 episodes	100 min.	
Asi (TV series)	26 October 2007	19 June 2009	2 seasons, 71 episodes	100 min.	
Aşk ve Ceza	5 January 2010	27 June 2011	2 seasons, 62 episodes	90 min.	
Asla Vazgeçmem	12 February 2015	6 October 2016	3 seasons, 59 episodes	107-155 min.	
Asmalı Konak	11 March 2002	16 June 2003	2 seasons, 54 episodes	60 min.	
Aşk Laftan Anlamaz	15 June 2016	19 February 2017	1 season, 31 episodes	120 min.	
Aşk Yeniden	10 February 2015	14 June 2016	2 seasons, 59 episodes	110 min.	
Aşk ve Mavi	4 November 2016	16 November 2018	3 seasons, 78 episodes	90 min.	
Aşk-ı Memnu	4 September 2008	24 June 2010	2 seasons, 79 episodes	90 min.	
Ayrılık	13 October 2009	16 February 2010	1 season, 26 episodes	100 min.	
Baba Evi (tr)	19 September 1997	8 June 2001	4 seasons, 148 episodes	60 min.	
Behzat Ç. Bir Ankara Polisiyesi	19 September 2010	19 September 2019	4 seasons, 105 episodes	40-90 min.	
Benim Hala Umudum Var	1 July 2013	25 February 2014	1 season, 33 episodes	90 min.	
Ben Onu Çok Sevdim	10 September 2013	24 January 2014	1 season, 15 episodes	90 min.	
Bir Çocuk Sevdim	9 September 2011	18 June 2012	1 season, 39 episodes	90 min.	
Bir Zamanlar Osmanlı: Kıyam	12 March 2012	17 December 2012	2 seasons, 20 episodes	80 min.	
Bitmeyen Şarkı	23 September 2010	26 April 2011	1 season, 32 episodes	95 min.	
Black Rose	29 March 2013	10 June 2016	4 seasons, 125 episodes	135-150 min.	
Bana Sevmeyi Anlat	26 August 2016	30 January 2017	1 season, 22 episodes	140 min.	
Belalı Baldız	11 September 2005	22 June 2006	1 season, 34 episodes	60 min.	
Binbir Gece	7 November 2006	12 May 2009	3 seasons, 90 episodes	90 min.	
Bir Bulut Olsam	23 February 2009	24 December 2009	2 seasons, 27 episodes	90 min.	
Bir Istanbul Masalı (tr)	18 September 2003	13 June 2005	2 seasons, 71 episodes	75 min.	
Bir Litre Gözyaşı (tr)	7 October 2018	3 February 2019	1 season, 15 episodes	120 min.	
Bizim Hikaye	14 September 2017	23 May 2019	2 seasons, 70 episodes	120 min.	
Bizimkiler	7 January 1989	27 December 2002	5 seasons, 465 episodes	120 min.	
Bodrum Masalı (tr)	18 August 2016	18 June 2017	1 season, 42 episodes	120 min.	
Börü	28 February 2018	11 April 2018	1 season, 6 episodes	120 min.	
Brave and Beautiful	10 November 2016	22 June 2017	1 season, 101 episodes	60 min.	
Canan (TV series)	9 February 2011	19 October 2011	2 seasons, 28 episodes	100 min.	
Cennet'in Gözyaşları	24 September 2017	1 June 2017	1 season, 36 episodes	115 min.	
Çalıkuşu (TV series)	24 September 2013	17 May 2014	1 season, 30 episodes	100 min.	
Çarpışma	22 November 2018	30 May 2019	1 season, 24 episodes	140 min.	
Diriliş: Ertuğrul	10 December 2014	29 May 2019	5 seasons, 150 episodes	105-164 min.	
Dolunay	4 July 2017	31 December 2017	1 season, 26 episodes	120 min.	
Elif (TV series)	15 September 2014	10 June 2019	3 seasons, 154 episodes	100 min.	
Elveda Rumeli (tr)	20 September 2007	19 October 2009	3 seasons, 83 episodes	90 min.	
Endless Love	14 October 2015	21 June 2017	2 seasons, 74 episodes	113-158 min.	
Eve Düşen Yıldırım	9 March 2012	15 October 2012	2 seasons, 22 episodes	90 min.	
Ezel (TV series)	28 September 2009	20 June 2011	2 seasons, 71 episodes	90 min.	
Family Secrets	19 September 2016	12 December 2016	1 season, 13 episodes	120 min.	
Fatih (TV series)	5 January 2013	11 June 2013	1 season, 5 episodes	90-150 min.	
Fatih Harbiye	31 August 2013	10 December 2014	2 seasons, 50 episodes	115 min.	
Fatmagül'ün Suçu Ne?	16 September 2010	21 June 2012	2 seasons, 80 episodes	90 min.	
Fi (TV series)	31 March 2017	9 March 2018	2 seasons, 22 episodes	60 min.	
Filinta	23 December 2014	23 December 2016	2 seasons, 149 episodes	110 min.	
Gece Gündüz	4 July 2008	22 March 2009	1 season, 29 episodes	80 min.	
Güllerin Savaşı	8 July 2014	6 February 2016	2 seasons, 68 episodes	105 min.	
Gülperi	15 September 2018	3 May 2019	1 season, 30 episodes	120 min.	
Güneşin Kızları	18 June 2015	19 March 2016	1 season, 39 episodes	120 min.	
Hanımın Çiftliği (TV series)	4 September 2009	17 June 2011	2 seasons, 70 episodes	60 min.	
Hatırla Sevgili	7 November 2006	6 June 2008	2 seasons, 68 episodes	120 min.	
Hayat Şarkısı	9 February 2016	6 June 2017	2 seasons, 57 episodes	120 min.	
Huzur Sokağı (tr)	7 September 2012	18 April 2014	2 seasons, 67 episodes	90 min.	
İffet	17 September 2011	24 September 2012	2 seasons, 40 episodes	90 min.	
İlişki Durumu: Karışık	4 July 2015	27 April 2016	2 seasons, 105 episodes	100 min.	
Immortals (2018 TV series)	17 July 2018	18 October 2018	1 season, 8 episodes	60 min.	
İnadına Aşk (tr)	2 July 2015	3 February 2016	1 season, 32 episodes	120 min.	
İnsanlık Suçu (tr)	1 April 2018	20 May 2018	1 season, 8 episodes	110 min.	
İntikam	3 January 2013	20 February 2014	2 seasons, 44 episodes	90 min.	
İstanbullu Gelin	3 March 2017	31 May 2019	3 seasons, 87 episodes	120 min.	
Kadın (TV series)	24 October 2017	4 February 2020	3 seasons, 81 episodes	120 min.	
Kanıt (TV series)	8 July 2010	3 February 2013	3 seasons, 100 episodes	75 min.	
Kanıt: Ateş Üstünde (tr)	12 July 2016	30 August 2016	1 season, 8 episodes	120 min.	
Karadağlar	8 November 2010	7 February 2011	1 season, 14 episodes	90 min.	
Karadayı	8 October 2012	11 June 2015	3 seasons, 115 episodes	130 min.	
Kara Para Aşk	12 March 2014	15 July 2015	2 seasons, 54 episodes	130 min.	
Kardeş Payı	13 February 2014	30 April 2015	2 seasons, 35 episodes	70 min.	
Kavak Yelleri	31 May 2007	30 August 2011	5 seasons, 170 episodes	100 min.	
Kınalı Kar	12 September 2002	24 December 2004	3 seasons, 90 episodes	60 min.	
Kırgın Çiçekler	29 June 2015	12 March 2018	3 seasons, 113 episodes	120 min.	
Kızım Nerede?	17 December 2010	3 August 2011	1 season, 26 episodes	120 min.	
Kiralık Aşk	19 June 2015	20 January 2017	2 seasons, 69 episodes	120 min.	
Kurtlar Vadisi Pusu (tr)	19 April 2007	16 June 2016	10 seasons, 300 episodes	120 min.	
Kurt Seyit ve Şura	4 March 2014	20 November 2014	2 seasons, 21 episodes	90 min.	
Kuzey Güney	7 September 2011	26 June 2013	2 seasons, 80 episodes	90 min.	
Lale Devri	14 September 2010	8 February 2014	4 seasons, 135 episodes	91 min.	
Leyla and Mecnun	9 February 2011	17 June 2013	3 seasons, 104 episodes	80 min.	
Little Lord	28 January 2013	17 March 2015	2 seasons, 50 episodes	100 min.	
Little Secrets (TV series)	14 July 2010	2 September 2011	2 seasons, 55 episodes	90 min.	
Medcezir	13 September 2013	12 June 2015	2 seasons, 77 episodes	90-120 min.	
Merhaba Hayat	9 September 2012	13 February 2013	1 season, 13 episodes	90 min.	
Merhamet	13 February 2013	12 March 2014	2 seasons	95 min.	
Mrs. Fazilet and Her Daughters	25 March 2017	9 June 2018	2 seasons, 50 episodes	150 min.	
Muhteşem Yüzyıl	5 January 2011	11 June 2014	4 season, 139 episodes	100-120 min.	
Muhteşem Yüzyıl: Kösem	12 November 2015	27 June 2017	2 seasons, 60 episodes	120-155 min.	
Night Queen	12 January 2016	19 April 2016	2 seasons, 15 episodes	120-150 min.	
No 309	1 June 2016	25 October 2017	2 seasons, 65 episodes	145 min.	
O Hayat Benim	14 February 2014	2 May 2017	4 seasons, 131 episodes	110-170 min.	
Ötesiz İnsanlar	21 November 2013	15 June 2015	2 seasons, 72 episodes	140 min.	
Öyle Bir Geçer Zaman ki	14 September 2010	18 June 2013	3 seasons, 120 episodes	120 min.	
Paramparça (TV series)	1 December 2014	27 March 2017	3 seasons, 97 episodes	120-150 min.	
Poyraz Karayel	7 January 2015	1 March 2017	3 seasons, 82 episodes	120-150 min.	
Rise of Empires: Ottoman	24 January 2020	24 January 2020	1 season, 6 episodes	45 min.	
Ruhsar (tr)	7 February 1998	29 December 2001	5 seasons, 108 episodes	120-150 min.	
Second Spring	29 October 1998	11 January 2001	3 seasons, 37 episodes	90 min.	
Sen Anlat Karadeniz	24 January 2018	13 November 2019	3 seasons, 64 episodes	120 min.	
Sıla	15 September 2006	19 September 2008	3 seasons, 79 episodes	82 min.	
Siyah Beyaz Aşk	16 October 2017	28 May 2018	1 season, 32 episodes	120 min.	
Son (TV series)	9 January 2012	25 June 2012	1 season, 25 episodes	90 min.	
Suskunlar	1 March 2012	2 December 2012	2 seasons, 8 episodes	90 min.	
Şefkat Tepe	6 November 2010	5 July 2014	4 seasons, 158 episodes	95 min.	
Şeref Meselesi	23 November 2014	17 May 2015	1 season, 26 episodes	120 min.	
Tatar Ramazan (tr)	26 April 2013	26 January 2014	2 seasons, 26 episodes	105 min.	
Tatlı İntikam	26 March 2016	12 November 2016	1 season, 30 episodes	120 min.	
Tatlı Küçük Yalancılar	6 July 2015	3 October 2015	1 season, 13 episodes	120 min.	
The Protector	14 December 2018	9 July 2020	4 seasons, 32 episodes	30-50 min.	
Ufak Tefek Cinayetler (tr)	24 October 2017	11 December 2018	2 seasons, 45 episodes	120 min.	
Ulan İstanbul	23 June 2014	23 March 2015	1 season, 39 episodes	115 min.	
Umutsuz Ev Kadınları	2 October 2011	19 June 2014	3 seasons, 154 episodes	45-100 min.	
Vatanım Sensin	27 October 2016	7 June 2018	2 seasons, 59 episodes	150-200 min.	
Vuslat	7 January 2019	9 March 2020	2 seasons, 44 episodes	130 min.	
Yaprak Dökümü (TV series)	13 September 2006	29 December 2010	5 seasons, 174 episodes	60-90 min.	
Yaralı Kuşlar (tr)	1 April 2019	29 November 2019	1 seasons, 165 episodes	50 min.	
Yaşamayanlar (tr)	6 September 2018	18 October 2018	1 season, 8 episodes	120 min.	
Zil Çalınca	23 April 2013	22 June 2013	2 seasons, 40 episodes	5-8 min.	
Ruhun Duymaz	24 July 2023	2023	1 Seasons, 5 episodes	120 min.	
Yaz Şarkısı	9 July 2023	27 August 2023	1 Seasons, 8 episodes	120 min.	
