= Cicek =

Cicek may refer to:

- Ciçek (Eğirdir minnow), species of ray-finned fish in the family Cyprinidae
- Çiçek, Turkish surname
