= Tolgahan Sayışman =

Turkish actor and model (born 1981)

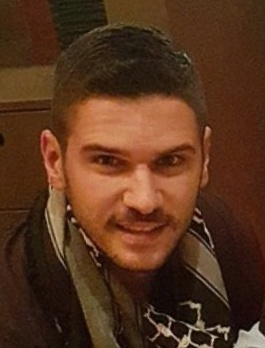
- Born: Turgut Tolgahan Sayışman; 7 December 1981 (age 44); Istanbul, Turkey
- Occupations: Actor; model
- Years active: 2004–present
- Spouse: Almeda Abazi (m. 2017)
- Children: 2

Turgut Tolgahan Sayışman (born 7 December 1981) is a Turkish actor and model, who rose to fame after winning the Manhunt International competition in 2005 in South Korea.

== Life and career ==
Sayışman was born on 17 December 1981 in Istanbul, Turkey. His father is a muhacir from Thessaloniki and his mother is from Trabzon. He graduated from Kadıköy İntaş High School and Doğuş University, Faculty of Business Administration. Sayışman was the runner-up in the Best Model of Turkey competition in 2002. In 2005, he won the Manhunt International men's beauty contest in South Korea, representing Turkey.

He came to attention for playing the character "Namık" in the hit series Elveda Rumeli, about Turks in Macedonia when the Ottoman Empire lost its European lands. He joined Acemi Cadı, the Turkish adaptation of "Sabrina The Teenage Witch", and Kavak Yelleri, adaptation of "Dawson's Creek", as well as "Hepsi 1" series of Hepsi girls music group. He played as Çınar Ilgaz in the series Lale Devri and in Yer Gök Aşk alongside Serenay Sarıkaya, Selen Soyder.

He was a cast in the period film "Sürgün" and "Bizans Oyunları" a remake of period comedy "Kahpe Bizans". He was in films Aşk Tutulması alongside Fahriye Evcen, Aşk Geliyorum Demez alongside Bergüzar Korel, Eski Sevgili alongside Bade İşçil and Aynasız Haluk.

== Filmography ==
| Year | Production | Role | Notes |
|---|---|---|---|
| 2008 | Aşk Tutulması | Uğur | |
| 2009 | Aşk Geliyorum Demez | Ali | |
| 2014 | Sürgün | Sedat | |
| 2015 | Mazlum Kuzey | Tolgahan | |
| 2016 | Bizans Oyunları | Prens Adonis | |
| 2017 | Eski Sevgili | Barış | |
| 2022 | Aynasız Haluk | Haluk- Efe | |

| Year | Production | Role |
|---|---|---|
| 2006 | Acemi Cadı | Guest |
| 2006 | Esir Kalpler | Levent Ertekin |
| 2006 | Maçolar | Tuncay |
| 2007 | Dicle | Ferhat |
| 2007–2009 | Elveda Rumeli | Namık/Mustafa |
| 2007 | Hepsi1 | Ali Koş |
| 2009 | Kavak Yelleri | |
| 2010–2014 | Lale Devri | Çınar Ilgaz |
| 2011 | Yer Gök Aşk | Çınar Ilgaz |
| 2015–2016 | Asla Vazgeçmem | Yiğit Kozan |
| 2017–2018 | Siyah Inci | Kenan Celebi |
| 2018 | Bir Umut Yeter | Yılmaz Karabey |
| 2019–2020 | Şampiyon | Fırat Bölükbaşı |
| 2020 | Şeref Sözü | Cihan Adabeyli |
| 2022–2023 | Barbaros Hayreddin: Sultanın Fermanı | Barbaros Hayreddin Pasha |
