= Şoray Uzun =

- Born: 9 June 1967 (age 58); Razgrad, Bulgaria
- Occupations: Comedian, Television presenter
- Years active: 1987–present

Şoray Uzun (born 9 June 1967) is a Turkish comedian, writer and television host. He is best known for hit period comedy series Seksenler and travel programming Şoray Uzun Yolda.

== Early life ==
He is one of the Turk minority in Bulgaria. When he was child, his family was forced to immigrate to Turkey.

== Career ==
He played in mini series "Belene" about Turk emigration in Bulgaria. Also, he was cast in many hit series such as "Bizimkiler", " Baskül Ailesi", "Mahallenin Muhtarları", "İz Peşinde", "Gençler", "Kaygısızlar", "Bizim Ev".

He has been the host of the popular game show Cevap Soruda on TRT 1 in 2013 and of 7 de 7, the Turkish version of Quizz or Buzz on ATV in 2014.

== Personal life ==
He is married and has 2 children.

== Cinema ==
- Cumhuriyet (1998)
- İstanbul 24 Saat (1996)
- Denize Hançer Düştü (1992)
- Salıncakta Üç Kişi (1988)
- Yalnızlık Bir Şarkıdır (1987)

== Television ==
- Kendi Düşen Ağlamaz (2023)
- Zengin Kız Fakir Oğlan (2014) – Himself, guest appearance
- Çocuklar Duymasın – (2013) Korhan, guest appearance
- Seksenler (2012–2017) – Ahmet
- Sonradan Görme (2005) – Bülent
- Öyle Bir Sevda ki (2002)
- Zülküf ile Zarife (2000)
- Köstebek (1999)
- Ruhsar (1998) – Elvis Presley, guest appearance
- Baskül Ailesi (1997) – Güven
- Süt Kardeşler (1996)
- Evdekiler (1995)
- Bizim Ev (1995) – Doctor Kemal
- Kaygısızlar (1994–1998) – Kültigin
- Geçmişin İzleri (1994)
- Barışta Savaşanlar (1993)
- Mahallenin Muhtarları (1992) – Ferhat
- Karşı Show (1992)
- İz Peşinde (1989–1990) – Faruk
- Gençler (1989)
- Belene (1987)

== Television host ==
- 7 de 7, Turkish version of Quizz or Buzz (2014)
- Cevap Soruda (2013)
- Saha Dışı
- Şoray Uzun Yolda
