= Ilhami =

Ilhami is a Turkish given name for males. Notable people with the name include:

- Ilhami Çene (1909–1977), Turkish fencer
- Ilhami Çiçek (1954–1983), Turkish poet

== See also ==
- Ilham
