= Ege Kökenli =

Turkish actress

- Born: 20 March 1993 (age 33); Kırklareli, Turkey
- Education: Haliç University; Istanbul Bilgi University
- Occupation: Actress
- Years active: 2004–present
- Spouse: Lior Ahituv (m. 2022)

Ege Kökenli (born 20 March 1993) is a Turkish actress.

Kökenli was born in 1993 in Kırklareli. She has a younger brother, named Mert. She finished her secondary education there and then moved to Istanbul in order to enroll in a French high school. She then became a member of a theatre team who performed in French for 5 years and gave concerts.

She made her television debut at the age of 11 with a role in the fantasy child series En İyi Arkadaşım. She continued her career in television with teen roles in popular series Yahşi Cazibe, Öğretmen Kemal, Çalıkuşu, Güneşin Kızları. She finished her studies at the Haliç University Conservatory and then at Istanbul Bilgi University.

She was cast in medical series Kalp Atışı, youth series "Duy Beni", "Benim Tatlı Yalanım, "Kefaret", "Yasak Elma" and Asla Vazgeçmem.

She had leading role in comedy series "Doğu". She played in popular comedy films "Aykut Enişte", "Hava Muhalefeti".

== Filmography ==
Web Series
Year	Title	Role	Notes
2021	Doğu	Zeynep	Leading role

Television
Year	Title	Role	Notes
2004–2007	En İyi Arkadaşım	Ece	Supporting role
2006	Anadolu Kaplanı	Gizem	Supporting role
2010	Öğretmen Kemal	Peri	Supporting role
2011–2012	Yahşi Cazibe	Itır Kükreyen	Supporting role
2013	Çalıkuşu	Mari	Supporting role
2015	Güneşin Kızları	Melisa Taşkıran	Supporting role
2015–2016	Asla Vazgeçmem	Yaren Kozan	Supporting role
2017	Kalp Atışı	Dr. Bahar Tunç	Supporting role
2019	Yasak Elma	Yağmur	Supporting role
2019	Benim Tatlı Yalanım	Aylin Tunç	Supporting role
2020–2021	Kefaret	Nil	Supporting role
2021	Menajerimi Ara	Herself	Guest role
2022	Duy Beni	Bahar	Leading role

Film
Year	Title	Role	Notes
2014	Karanlıktan Sonra		Short film
2014	Çiçek	Defne	
2017	Taksim Hold'em	Seda	
2019	Aykut Enişte	Nurhan	Leading role
2020	Son Şaka	Ayşen	Leading role
2022	Obsesyon	Beren	Leading role
2023	Hava Muhalefeti		Leading role
