= Asla Vazgeçmem =

- Also known as: Never Let Go
- Genre: Romance; Drama
- Written by: Sırma Yanık; Melis Civelek
- Directed by: Nihat Durak; Aysun Akyüz; Eda Teksöz
- Starring: Tolgahan Sayışman; Amine Gülşe; Şafak Pekdemir; Ümit Yesin; Ayşegül Günay; Hülya Gülşen Irmak; Tugay Mercan; Taner Rumeli
- Country of origin: Turkey
- Original language: Turkish
- No. of seasons: 3
- No. of episodes: 59

Production
- Producer: Faruk Turgut
- Production locations: Istanbul, Turkey
- Running time: 107-155 minutes
- Production company: Gold Film

Original release
- Network: Show TV
- Release: February 12, 2015 – October 6, 2016

Asla Vazgeçmem (English title: Never Let Go) is a Turkish romantic drama television series, starring Tolgahan Sayışman, Amine Gülşe, Şafak Pekdemir, Ümit Yesin, Ayşegül Günay, Hülya Gülşen Irmak, Tugay Mercan and Taner Rumeli. It premiered on Show TV on February 12, 2015 and concluded on October 6, 2016.

== Cast ==
- Tolgahan Sayışman as Yiğit Kozan
- Amine Gülşe as Nur Demirağ Kozan
- Şafak Pekdemir as İclal Demirer Kozan
- Ayşegül Günay as Aytül Demirer
- Yonca Cevher as Nazan Kozan
- Tugay Mercan as Cahit Kozan
- Hülya Gülşen as Hafize Çelebi
- Ümit Yesin as Tayyar Çelebi
- Tuğçe Kumral as Elmas Çelebi Kozan
- Ege Kökenli as Yaren Kozan
- Hakan Dinçkol as Fırat Kozan
- Yağızkan Dikmen as Emin Çelebi
- Poyraz Bayramoğlu as Mert Kozan
- Şencan Güleryüz as Kerem Sancaktar
- Eren Hacısalihoğlu as Sinan
- Taner Rumeli as Fatih
- Gözde Mutluer as Yağmur Kozan
- Ferda İşil as Dudu
- Zeynep Köse as Fikret

== Series overview ==
Season	No. of episodes	Original broadcast date	
Season	No. of episodes	Inicio	Final
1	18	February 12, 2015	June 11, 2015
2	38	October 1, 2015	June 23, 2016
3	3	September 22, 2016	October 6, 2016
