= Evin Esen =

Turkish actress (1949–2012)

- Born: Evin Esen; May 11, 1949; Istanbul, Turkey
- Died: January 18, 2012 (aged 62); Istanbul, Turkey
- Occupation: Actress
- Years active: 1987–2012
- Spouse: Ümit Yesin (m. 1993; div. 1998)

Evin Esen (May 11, 1949 – January 18, 2012) was a Turkish TV series and movie actress.

== Early life ==
Esen was born on May 11, 1949, in Istanbul. She acted in TV series such as Çiçek Taksi and Tatlı Kaçıklar. Finally, she played Şaziment in Akasya Durağı. She died on January 18, 2012, as a result of a cerebral hemorrhage.

== Personal life ==
Esen married Turkish actor Ümit Yesin in 1993. The couple divorced in 1998.

== Death ==
Esen died on January 18, 2012, due to a brain hemorrhage. Evin Esen was bid farewell on her last journey on 19 January 2012 in Istanbul.

== Filmography ==
- Akasya Durağı -2008-2012
- Benim Annem Bir Melek -2008
- Aman Annem Görmesin -2008
- Baba Oluyorum - 2007
- Sardunya Sokağı -2007
- Bir Demet Tiyatro -2006
- Beşinci Boyut -2005
- Büyük Buluşma -2005, 2008
- Cennet Mahallesi -2004
- Yeni Hayat -2004
- Biz Boşanıyoruz -2004
- Beş Kollu Avize -2004
- Şöhretler Kebapçısı -2003
- Kara Gün -2003
- Yalanın Batsın - 2002
- Yarım Elma - 2002
- Sırlar Dünyası -2002
- Üzgünüm Leyla -2000
- Marziye -1998
- Böyle mi Olacaktı? -1997
- Tatlı Kaçıklar - 1996
- Çiçek Taksi -1995
- Huzura Giden Yol - 1995
- Yazlıkçılar - 1993
- Hastane - 1993
- Kederli Yıllar - 1993
- Şaşkın Gelin - 1993
- Üç Aşağı Beş Yukarı -1992
- Ana - 1991
- Bir Milyara Bir Çocuk - 1990
