= Lale Devri =

Turkish television drama series

- Genre: Drama
- Created by: Şebnem Çitak
- Written by: Sema Ergenekon; Eylem Canpolat
- Directed by: Onur Tan
- Starring: Tolgahan Sayışman; Selen Soyder; Hatice Aslan; Kenan Bal; Aykut Yılmaz
- Theme music composer: İskender Paydaş
- Composer: İskender Paydaş
- Country of origin: Turkey
- Original language: Turkish
- No. of seasons: 4
- No. of episodes: 135

Production
- Producer: Şükrü Avşar
- Running time: 90 minutes
- Production company: Avşar Film

Original release
- Network: Show TV (2010); FOX (2010 - 2014)
- Release: September 14, 2010 – February 8, 2014

Related
- Yer Gök Aşk

Lale Devri (English: Tulip Age) is a Turkish television drama series, originally aired on Show TV and FOX from 2010 to 2014.

== Cast ==
- Tolgahan Sayışman as Çınar Ilgaz
- Selen Soyder as Toprak Karagul Ilgaz
- Emina Jahović Sandal as Lale Taşkıran Ilgaz
- Serenay Sarıkaya as Yeşim Taşkıran
- Kenan Bal as Necip Ilgaz
- Hatice Aslan as Zümrüt Taşkıran
- Gül Onat as Ikbal Ilgaz
- Aykut Yılmaz as Kerem Taşkıran
- Ayten Soykök as Reyhan Ilgaz
- Ayşegül Günay as Sultan Yesilyurt
- Şerif Sezer as Nedret Ilgaz
- Selma Kutluğ as Şeref Karagül
- Ulvi Alacakaptan as Remzi Karagül
- Korel Cezayirli as Ahmet Çağın
- Kıvanç Kılınç as Sıtkı Engin
- Erdal Bilingen as Şefik
- Hakan Pişkin as Ekrem
- Gökhan Atalay as Mehmet
- Açelya Elmas as Ece
- Pamir Pekin as Cansel
- Ebru Nil Aydın as Nermin
- Gözde Mutluer as Aslı
- Gökhan Çetin as Medet
- Eren Bucak as Tibet
- Serdar Gökhan as Haluk Kırali
- Kadir Kandemir as Okan Bostanci
- Tolga Sala as Yiğit Yeşilyurt
- İpek Erdem as Münevver Hancıoğlu

== Series overview ==
Season	No. of Episodes	Timeslot	Start of the Season	End of the Season	Episodes	TV Channel
1	37	20:00; 22:15	September 14, 2010	June 11, 2011	1 - 37	Show TV / FOX
2	41	19:45	August 20, 2011	June 16, 2012	38 - 78	FOX
3	40	19:45; 21:00	September 8, 2012	June 15, 2013	79 - 117	FOX
4	17	22:00	September 21, 2013	February 8, 2014	118 - 135	FOX

Cinar is a very wealthy businessman. He has great respect for his uncle, who is like a father figure to him.

Lale is a beautiful and good-natured girl. She finds out that her father's death is caused by her mother's infidelity. She has a younger sister and a younger brother. Her sister Yasmin also likes Cinar.

However, Cinar and Lale fall in love and get married soon. They have a daughter also named Lale. Soon after, Lale (mother) dies which leaves Cinar devastated. Yasmin who has been interested in Cinar before Lale's accident takes the opportunity to comfort Cinar and they sleep together. However, Cinar knows that this is wrong and needs to stay away from Yasmin.

Cinar goes to a friend's wedding and meets a beautiful but sad girl, Toprak, who is devastated over her love's interest marriage to her sister. Cinar finds solace in her and asks her to marry him as a marriage of convenience, which should help Cinar stay away from Yasmin and help Toprak heal her heart.

Toprak accepts the proposal and they start their platonic relationship. Yasmin is extremely jealous of Toprak and often reminds her of her poor background as well as her divorce.

Yasmin gets pregnant with Cinar's child. She decides to keep the baby despite everyone's disapproval. The baby is born but has a unique medical issue that can only be solved by the bone marrow of a sibling. Lale's bone marrow does not match.

Cinar and Toprak eventually fall in love, but Yasmin will do all in her power to sabotage their relationship. She finds Toprak's ex-husband and bribes him with money, so that together they can set up a trap for Toprak. Meanwhile, Toprak gets pregnant, but Yasmin manages to put a doubt in who the father is. Circumstances put Toprak in jail, and she ends up leaving Cinar. She goes to a family who accept her and a boy in the family, Ahmet, wants to marry her.

Cinar is now lost without Toprak and tries to reconcile with her. Toprak divorces Cinar and hides her pregnancy from him. She makes Cinar think she got an abortion. Even though they still love each other, Toprak tries to move on and to keep Cinar away marries Ahmet. With pressure from the family Cinar marries Yasmin, even though he is madly in love with Toprak and is at a loss. Even though he is married, Yasmin thinks she has won, but Cinar refuses to even touch her. When he finally decides that he has completely lost Toprak and will have no other choice but try to make a life with Yasmin, Sitki shows up at Cinar's office with a recording that will change everything.

== International broadcasters ==
Country	Local name	Network	Premiere date
Northern Cyprus	Lale Devri	FOX	September 14, 2010
Serbia	Polje lala	RTV Pink	April 18, 2011
Bosnia and Herzegovina	Polje lala	Pink BH	April 18, 2011
Montenegro	Polje lala	Pink M	April 18, 2011
Slovakia	Láska v Istanbule	TV JOJ	June 28, 2011
Romania	Anotimpul lalelelor	Euforia Lifestyle TV	3 October 2011
Romania	Lale	Antena 1	7 November 2011
Czech Republic	Čas tulipánů	TV Barrandov	December, 2011
Albania	Lale	KTV	2011
Kosovo	Lale	Kohavision	2011
North Macedonia	Лале	Kanal 5	2011
Iran	عمر گل لاله	GEM TV; AAA Family	2012
Lebanon	Leyla	New TV	2014
Greece	Lale, Έρωτας στην Κωνσταντινούπολη	Alpha TV	March 12, 2012
Bulgaria	Сезони на любовта	Diema Family	April 29, 2013
Georgia	ტიტების პერიოდი	Rustavi 2	July 24, 2013
Pakistan	Junoon Tere Pyar Ka	Hum TV	2013
Arab World	ليلى	MBC 4	2014
India		Zindagi	

== Awards ==
Year	Awards	Category	Source(s)
2010	Siyaset Dergisi Ödülleri	Series of the Year	
2011	2011 Antalya Televizyon Ödülleri	Jury Special Award	

== See also ==
- Television in Turkey
- List of Turkish television series
- Turkish television drama
