= The International High School of the Gothenburg Region =

The International High School
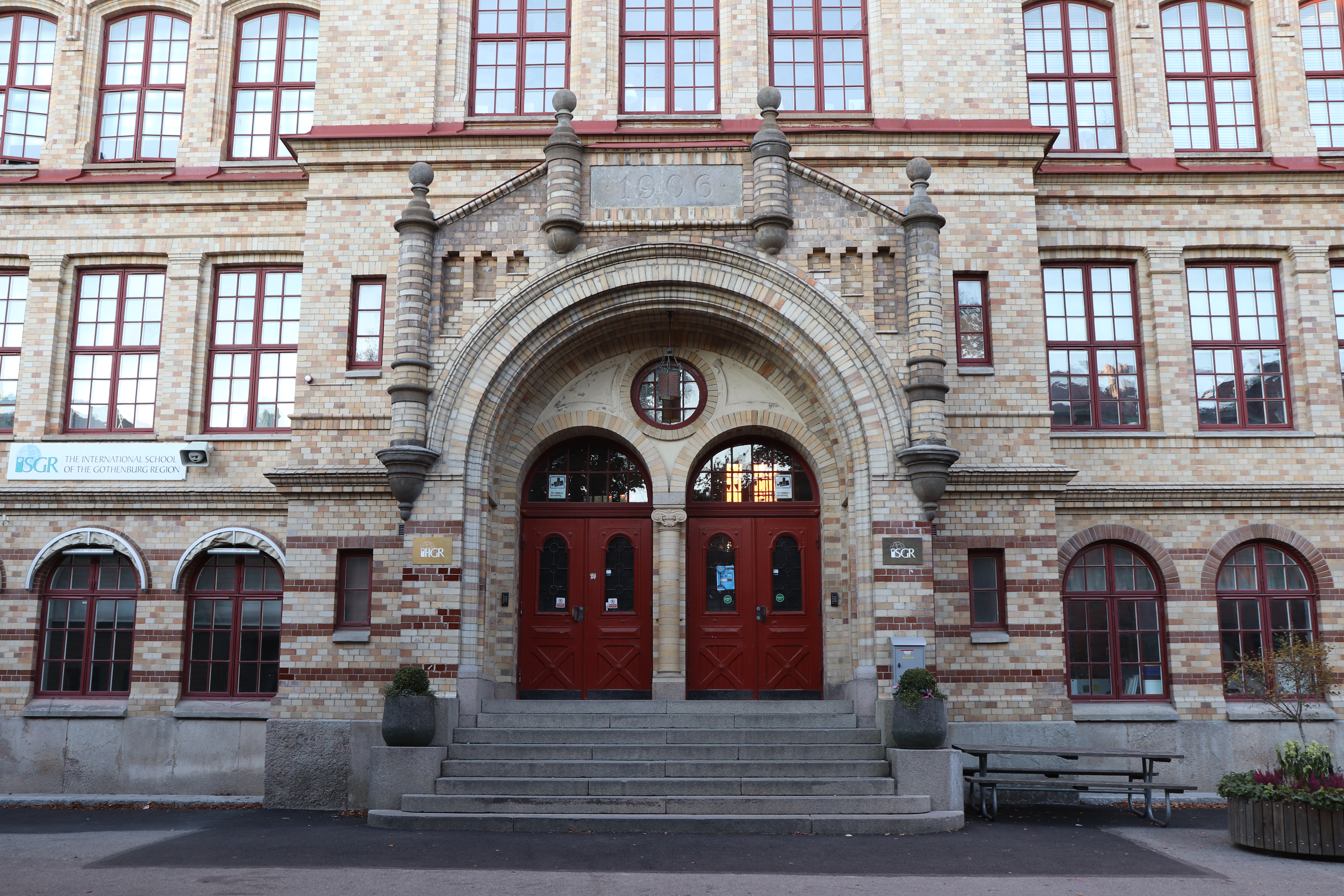

Location
- Molinsgatan 6 Gothenburg; Västra Götaland; Sweden

Information
- School type: High School, Upper Secondary School; International Baccalaureate School
- Established: 2002
- Founder: The Gothenburg Region Association of Local Authorities (GR)
- Principal: Kristina Bergman Alme
- Teaching staff: 25
- Grades: 10-12
- Enrollment: 350
- Language: English (main), Swedish
- Website: goteborg.se/wps/portal/enhetssida/the-international-high-school

The International High School of the Gothenburg Region (IHGR) also known as The International High School is a municipal high school in Gothenburg, Sweden.

The school was founded in 2002. All classes except for Swedish are taught in English, the official language of the school, but a Swedish curriculum is followed in the social science and natural science programs. The International Baccalaureate Diploma Programme, however, has a separate curriculum. The school has its own library. Since the school is an international school, there are students studying there from different countries; as many as 60 nationalities are represented.

The school shares a building with the primary International School of the Gothenburg Region.

The International High School has approximately 350 students and 25 teachers.

== Programs ==
The High School has the

- International Baccalaureate Programme (IB)

and two national programmes

1. Natural Science: Life Science Programme and
2. Social Studies: Global Studies Programme, which includes an accelerated option:
  1. Social Studies: Global Studies Programme Enriched - PACE ("Social-studies program with advanced Swedish" (in Swedish, Samhällsvetenskapsprogrammet med avancerad engelska); cf., Advanced Placement courses from the College Board.

In all programs, almost all teaching is done in English. Naturally, Swedish is a language of instruction for courses in the Swedish language or Swedish language and literature.

== Notable alumni ==
- Amine Gülşe Özil, Miss Turkey 2014
