= Ecem Çırpan =

Turkish volleyball player, model, and beauty pageant contestant

- Born: 10 July 1996 (age 30); Bursa, Turkey
- Education: Yeni Yüzyıl University
- Height: 1.85 m (6 ft 1 in)
- Beauty pageant titleholder
- Title: Miss Turkey 2015
- Hair color: Brown
- Eye color: Green
- Major competitions: Miss Turkey 2015 (Winner for Miss World); Miss World 2015 (Unplaced)

Ecem Çırpan (born 10 July 1996) is a Turkish volleyball player, model and beauty pageant titleholder born and raised in Bursa, Turkey. She was crowned Miss Turkey 2015 and represented her country at the Miss World 2015 pageant.

== Life and career ==
Born and raised in Bursa, Turkey she currently resides in Istanbul, Turkey where she works as a model.

== Pageantry ==
=== Miss Turkey 2015 ===
Ecem won Miss Turkey 2015 and was crowned as Miss World Turkey. She represented her country in Miss World 2015 in Sanya, China but did not place.

Awards and achievements
Preceded by Amine Gülşe	Miss World Turkey; 2015	Succeeded by
