= Şafak Pekdemir =

Turkish actress

- Born: 19 June 1988 (age 38); Istanbul, Turkey
- Education: Beykent University Faculty of Fine Arts
- Occupation: Actress
- Years active: 2009–present
- Spouse: Burak Mengü (m. 2017; sep. 2018)

Şafak Pekdemir (born 19 June 1988) is a Turkish actress.

== Early life and education ==
Şafak Pekdemir was born on 19 June 1988 in Istanbul, Turkey. She is a graduate of Beykent University Faculty of Fine Arts.

== Career ==
Before starting her acting career she made her debut in short film Sadist in 2009. In 2010, she started her acting career and made her debut in the series Türk Malı depicting the character of Zehra. In 2011, she appeared in the TV series Firar, in the same year she portrayed the character of Asıl Demircan in the series Süphe which starred Selin Demiratar, Serkan Altunorak and İsmail Hacıoğlu. In 2012, she depicted the character of Nisan in the series Leyla ve Mecnun, in 2014 she appeared in the movie İncir Reçeli 2 portraying the character of Gizem. In 2015, she appeared in the series Asla Vazgeçmem and depicted the character of İclal. In 2017, she made her debut in the movie Deli Aşk portraying the character of Zeynep, the next year she had a leading role in the movie Deniz ve Güneş. In 2018, she made her debut on the series Yasak Elma portraying the character of Zehra Argun, the daughter of Halit Argun (portrayed by Talat Bulut). The show was broadcast on FOX and starred Şevval Sam, Eda Ece and Nesrin Cavadzade. She has a main role in the series, which is one of the most highly rated shows on air in Turkey.

== Personal life ==
Pekdemir married Burak Mengü, the son of Şahin Mengü and the brother of Nevşin Mengü in December 2017. The couple reportedly separated in August 2018.

== Filmography ==
Film
Year	Title	Role
2009	Sadist	-
2014	İncir Reçeli 2	Gizem
2017	Deli Aşk	Zeynep
2018	Deniz ve Güneş	Güneş
2022	Barış Akarsu "Merhaba"	
Television
Year	Title	Role
2010	Türk Malı	Zehra
2011	Firar	Sevgi
2011	Süphe	Asıl Demircan
2012	Leyla ve Mecnun	Nisan
2015–2016	Asla Vazgeçmem	İclal Demirer Kozan
2018–2021	Yasak Elma	Zehra Argun
2021	Yalancılar ve Mumları	Meliha
2022	Senden Daha Güzel	Sevda Tuzkan
2023	EGO	Esin Meriçli

== Theatre ==
Theatre
Year	Title
2009	Tersine Dünya
2010	Savaş ve Barış
