= Ötesiz İnsanlar =

Turkish television drama series

- Genre: Romance; Drama
- Directed by: Başak Soysal
- Starring: Ergül Miray Şahin; Batuhan Aydar; Hüseyin Köroğlu />Ayman almoula
- Composer: Yücel Arzen
- Country of origin: Turkey
- Original language: Turkish
- No. of seasons: 2
- No. of episodes: 72

Production
- Producer: Ömer Önder
- Production locations: Istanbul, Ankara
- Running time: 90–120 minutes

Original release
- Network: Samanyolu TV (HD)
- Release: November 21, 2013 – June 15, 2015

Ötesiz Ìnsanlar (English: The Desperate People) is a Turkish television drama series that originally aired on Samanyolu TV from November 21, 2013, to June 15, 2015.

== Plot ==
Elif (Ergül Miray Şahin), an idealistic eighteen-year-old girl living in a village, aspires to become a doctor and study at the Istanbul University. With the help of Deniz Aydin, a good-hearted soldier who was on duty in her village at the time, helps her escape with him from her father who wanted to marry her to a man in exchange of money. Deniz immediately falls in love with Elif's pure and strong character. Elif while in Istanbul soon finds out she has to take off her hijab to study in the university.

Deniz continuously looks out for Elif and helps her in every way possible. Elif, initially denying, eventually confesses her love for Deniz. Deniz's wealthy family opposes the hijab-wearing tradition, similar to other Turkish people, and the family immediately despises Elif at first sight.

Against his will, Deniz is engaged to another woman, Sanam. She does everything possible to make Elif's life miserable because she is aware that Deniz only loves Elif.

Elif encounters numerous social prejudices but never gives up. She perseveres in her job and completes her education while refusing to give up on her hijab and her religion.

== Cast ==
- Ergül Miray Şahin as Elif
- Batuhan Aydar as Teğmen(Lieutenant) Deniz Aydın
- İlker Hüseyin Köroğlu as Albay(Colonel) later Tuğgeneral(Brigadier General) Sancar Canlıca
- Naşit Özcan as Korgeneral(Lieutenant General) Kudret Karay
- Sevinç Gürşen Ayyıldız as Rana Karay
- Yıldırım Gücük as Yılmaz
- Sibel Seyhan as İnci
- Aytunç Özulus as Durali
- Mustafa Onur Akpınar as Ziya
- Derya Taşbaşı as Sinem
- Yasemin Öztürk as Şenay Aydın
- Şensel Uykal as Adile Teyze
- Selçuk Soğukçay] as Sabri Komutan
- Reyhan Nur Çalıkoğlu as Serap
- Mert Temizce as Erdem
- Canan Çiftel as Rana
- Hakverdi Biber as Binbaşı(Major) Şahin
- Dalya Kilimci as Filiz
- Özge Küçükoğlu as Süheyla
- Belma Mamati as Kumru
- Nazlı Yanılmaz as Sanem Karay
- Asuman Çakır as Kadriye

== International broadcasters ==
Country	Local name	Network	Premiere date
Northern Cyprus	Otesiz insanlar	Samanyolu TV	November 21, 2013
Pakistan	Alif	SEE TV	2013
Tunisia	Raghma al Ahzan	Hannibal tv	2015
Iraq	Elif tv	TRT العربيه	2016
Colombia	Los Otros	Telecaribe	May 10, 2021

== See also ==
- Television in Turkey
- List of Turkish television series
- Turkish television drama
