= Almeda Abazi =

Albanian actress, model and beauty queen (born 1992)

- Born: 13 February 1992 (age 34); Tirana, Albania
- Title: Miss Tirana 2007; Miss Albania 2008; The Miss Globe 2008
- Spouse: Tolgahan Sayışman (m. 2017)
- Children: 2

Almeda Abazi Sayişman (born 13 February 1992) is an Albanian-born Turkish actress, model and beauty pageant titleholder who was crowned Miss Tirana 2007, Miss Albania 2008 and Miss Globe 2008.

== Life and career ==
Almeda Abazi was born on 13 February 1992 in Albania. In the three beauty contests she participated, she was chosen as the queen and won the Miss Tiran, Miss Albania and Miss Globe Universe in 2008. She completed her high school education at Tarhan Private College in Istanbul. She studied in the acting department of the Bil Sanat Academy of Istanbul Aydın University. Almeda Abazi settled in Turkey and decided to continue her professional life in Turkey. She has appeared in the films called Konak, Show Business and also in the TRT series called Ayrılık. She also joined Yok Böyle Dans (Turkish version of the Dancing with the Stars) in 2011 and Survivor Ünlüler-Gönüllüler (Survivor celebrities-volunteers). She played in Muhteşem Yüzyıl as Valeria. She appeared in Para Bende with Murat Ceylan as presenter on TV8 and joined the Survivor All Star contest again in 2015.

== Personal life ==
Abazi married Turkish actor Tolgahan Sayışman on 14 February 2017 in Los Angeles.
