= Quizz or Buzz =

- Genre: Game show
- Created by: Little Nemo
- Presented by: Şoray Uzun
- Country of origin: France
- No. of seasons: 1

Production
- Running time: 52 minutes
- Production company: Sinerji Prodüksiyon

Original release
- Network: ATV
- Release: July 2014

Quizz or Buzz is a TV game show of French origin, initially piloted by French channel TF1 in 2013 (hosted by Gérard Vivès and Estelle Denis, with the title "51 Buzzers") and in 2014 (hosted by Jean-Pierre Foucault with the title "The Last Buzzer"), and whose first international production was released by the Turkish channel ATV in the summer of 2014. It is based on multiple choice (MCQ) of general knowledge.

== Gameplay ==
Two contestants, working as a team, must correctly answer 7 general knowledge questions, each having 4 possible answers, to win €1,000 or €100,000.

30 buzzers are arranged in front of them and illuminate when pressed, randomly either green, or red, or golden yellow.

10 prizes of €100,000 and 10 prizes of €1,000 are at stake.

Of the 30 buzzers :

- 10 green buzzers remove a wrong answer.
- 10 golden buzzers eliminate a potential prize of €100,000.
- 10 red buzzers eliminate a potential prize of €1,000.

When contestants are unable to answer a question, they can search for a green buzzer to remove a wrong answer. During this search, contestants can also uncover:

- Some golden buzzers, eliminating desirable prizes (€100,000).
- Some red buzzers, eliminating less desirable prizes (€1,000).

When a green buzzer is found, the host asks what are the 2 answers between which they are hesitating. Contestants will select, of course, the 2 answers that they consider the most plausible. One of those answers is wrong. Therefore, an incorrect, but plausible, answer is withdrawn (however, nothing guarantees that the other un-eliminated answer is the correct answer, because contestants may not have indicated the correct answer among the 2 answers that they consider most plausible). Therefore, there are still 3 answers to choose from and contestants have as many seconds to answer as there remain unused buzzers.

When contestants can answer a question without the help of the buzzers, 2 red buzzers are removed.

A life-line, the "Give and Take" is available once per episode: It provides the answer, but removes 2 golden buzzers.

If the 7 questions are answered correctly, the remaining green buzzers are removed and the contestants choose a final buzzer. Tension is strong until the end, as they do not know if they will finally find a golden buzzer (and a prize of €100,000) or a red buzzer (and a prize of €1,000).

== International productions ==
The first season of Quizz or Buzz is produced by Sinerji Prodüksiyon with the Turkish title "7 de 7" in spring 2014 for a prime-time during Ramadan in the summer of 2014 on the ATV channel. The host is Şoray Uzun, who had previously hosted the popular Turkish game show Cevap Soruda on TRT 1.

In January 2015, Quizz or Buzz is produced in Saudi Arabia on Saudi T.V. Channel 1 channel, with the title : الإختيار (Al Ekhtiyar : The Choice), hosted by the Saudi young presenter Husam Al Harthi.
