= Amine Gülşe Özil =

Turkish actress

- Born: Amine Gülşe; 30 April 1993 (age 33); Gothenburg, Sweden
- Height: 1.77 m (5 ft 10 in)
- Spouse: Mesut Özil (m. 2019)
- Children: 2
- Beauty pageant titleholder
- Title: Miss World Turkey 2014
- Hair color: Brown
- Eye color: Green
- Major competitions: Miss Turkey 2014 (Winner for Miss World); Miss World 2014 (unplaced)

Amine Gülşe Özil (born 30 April 1993) is a Turkish-Swedish actress, model and beauty pageant titleholder born and raised in Sweden. She was crowned Miss Turkey 2014 and represented her country at the Miss World 2014 pageant.

== Life and career ==
Amine Gülşe was born and raised in Gothenburg, Sweden. Her mother is from İzmir, Turkey, and her father is an Iraqi Turkmen from Kirkuk, Iraq and she has a brother named Şahan Gülşe. She graduated from the International High School of the Gothenburg Region in 2012.

She relocated to Istanbul to work as an actress and a model. She starred in the 2015 Turkish television series Asla Vazgeçmem. In 2017 Amine began dating German footballer Mesut Özil. Her engagement to Özil was announced in January 2019. The couple married on 7 June 2019. Turkish President Recep Tayyip Erdoğan was the witness. In March 2020, the couple confirmed the birth of their first child, a daughter named Eda. Their second daughter, named Ela, was born in September 2022.

== Pageantry ==
=== Miss Turkey 2014 ===
Gülşe won Miss Turkey 2014 and was crowned as Miss World Turkey. After a year she crowned Ecem Cirpan as her successor.

=== Miss World 2014 ===
Amine competed at Miss World 2014 but did not place in the finals.

== Filmography ==
Television
Year	Title	Role	Notes
2014	Medcezir	Herself	Guest Appearance
2015-16	Asla Vazgeçmem	Nur Kozan	Leading role
2017	İkisini de Sevdim	Suna	Leading role

Cinema
Year	Title	Role	Notes
2022	Bir Türk Masalı	Peri	Leading role

Awards and achievements
Preceded by Ruveyda Öksüz	Miss World Turkey; 2014	Succeeded by Ecem Çirpan
