= Engin Benli =

Turkish actor

- Born: 23 February 1970 (age 55); İzmir, Turkey
- Occupation: Actor
- Years active: 1995–present
- Spouse: Çiğdem Sarıhan
- Children: 2

Engin Benli (born 23 February 1970) is a Turkish actor. He is known for his role as "Sinan Paşa" in Muhteşem Yüzyıl: Kösem.

== Biography ==
Benli was born on 23 February 1970. After completing his first education in İzmir, he completed his undergraduate education at the State Conservatory of Anadolu University in Eskişehir in 1995. He started his professional theatrical life as an actor in Ankara State Theatre. He then worked as a trainee artist at Bursa State Theatre between 1995 and 1997. Since 1997, the year of its establishment, he has been participating as an actor in the Izmit City Theater. In addition to being a theater actor, he also does various film and television work. In particular, he was widely known for his role as commander-in-chief Orhan in the series Kanıt, which aired between 2010 and 2013. He later played the character of Zafer in the series Poyraz Karayel. He played the character Artem in the TV series Göç Zamanı. In 2019, the 134th episode of the Diriliş Ertuğrul was released, he was involved in the series with his character Alıncak. In 2020, he joined the TV series Eşkıya Dünyaya Hükümdar Olmaz as Yaman Korkmaz.

== Filmography ==
=== Films ===
Year	Title	Role
2008	Polis	Volkan İzmitli
2011	Kırık Midyeler	Cevat
2015	Son Mektup	Fuat Binbaşı
2016	Yağmurda Yıkansam	Yılmaz

=== Television ===
Year	Title	Role
2010	Kanıt	Orhan Özdemir
2015	Poyraz Karayel	Zafer Biryol
2016	Göç Zamanı	Artem
2016	Muhteşem Yüzyıl Kösem	Sinan Paşa
2018	Koca Koca Yalanlar	Erdem
2018	Savaşçı	Kuzgun
2019	Diriliş Ertuğrul	Alıncak
2020	Eşkıya Dünyaya Hükümdar Olmaz	Yaman Korkmaz

2024 Hudutsuz sevda. Iskender Tugay
