= Çiçek =

Çiçek (means "flower") is a Turkish name (female) and surname.

Notable people with the name/surname include:

== People ==
- Ali Ekber Çiçek (1935–2006), Turkish folk musician
- Cemil Çiçek (born 1946), Turkish politician
- Çiçek Dilligil (born 1969), Turkish actress
- Dilan Çiçek Deniz (born 1995), Turkish actress and model
- Ilhami Çiçek (1954–1983), Turkish poet
