= Ümit Yesin =

Turkish actor

- Born: Mehmet Ümit Yesin; January 28, 1954; Ankara, Turkey
- Died: March 19, 2019 (aged 65); Istanbul, Turkey
- Occupations: Actor, Stage Actor
- Years active: 1970-2019

Mehmet Ümit Yesin (January 28, 1954 – March 19, 2019) was a Turkish stage and film actor. Yesin was best known for his portrayals as Şeker Kazım on Çiçek Taksi, Duran Ertürk on Akasya Durağı, and Korkut Bozok in Yeni Gelin. Mainly in supporting comedic roles, Yesin appeared in over 100 film and television productions during his career.

== Early life ==
Yesin was born on January 28, 1954, in Ankara. Yesin and his family would back and forth frequently between Ankara and Istanbul before settling in Istanbul in 1969.

== Career ==
Encouraged by Muammer Karaca, Yesin began his acting studies at the Bakırköy Municipal Theater in 1970.

Yesin made his film debut in the 1985 Şerif Gören film Kurbağalar.

== Personal life ==
Yesin married Turkish actress Evin Esen in 1993. The couple divorced in 1998.

== Death ==
Yesin died on March 19, 2019, following a heart valve surgery he underwent a month prior. A memorial service was held for Yesin on March 20, 2019, at Kadıköy Haldun Taner Stage.
