= Nevşin Mengü =

Turkish journalist and TV anchor

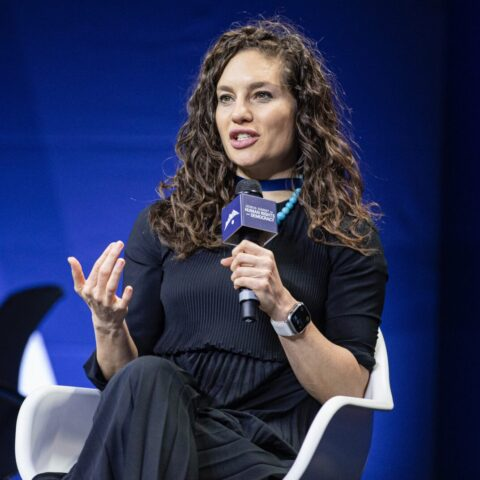
- Mengü at the 2023 Geneva Summit for Human Rights and Democracy
- Born: 2 May 1982 (age 43); Ankara, Turkey
- Education: Bilkent University; Galatasaray University
- Occupations: Journalist, TV presenter
- Years active: 2005–present

Nevşin Mengü (born 2 May 1982) is a Turkish journalist and television presenter.

For her middle school, Mengü attended TED Ankara College Foundation Schools, and had her undergraduate education at the political science department of Bilkent University. She received her master's degree from Galatasaray University with the thesis "Social views on Turkey". Due to her "open views on [different types of] freedom" and her respect and "recognition of different identities", she self-identifies as a liberal. In an interview, she stated that she has been a vegan since her childhood.

== Career ==
In 2006, Mengü started to work as a reporter in Habertürk. She quit her job in this channel upon the offer of working as a correspondent from Tehran for One Agency. She served as the agency's representative in Tehran for 1.5 years.

In July 2011, Mehmet Ali Birand, the main news presenter of Kanal D, a channel run by the media group of DYH, could not be present for broadcast due to health problems, and Mengü made history by presenting main news bulletins on two different Turkish television channels on the same day.

Her first book, İnsanın Düşünmekten Canı Yanar mı?, in which she wrote her observations during her reporting period in Iran, was published in November 2017 by Everest Publications.

..for both Turkish and Iranian women; we have a long and challenging road ahead. We've been locked into homes for centuries, and we've just recently started to be in every area of new life. We all have a semi-visible glass ceiling above our heads and you'll have to make a lot of effort to break it. We need to make the most of our work, we need to make the least concessions...

On 31 October 2017, she started writing for BirGün newspaper. She has been presenting a weekly YouTube news show at Deutsche Welle Turkish since November 2017. On 31 July 2019, she started writing a column for the online newspaper Diken.

=== Debate about her at the Parliament ===
In December 2010, Bülent Arınç, the state minister and deputy prime minister at the time, answered questions about the budget of the institutions affiliated to the ministry and the parliamentary questions, about which he said: "You accuse the staff of TRT, but the daughter of a CHP representative worked at TRT and received a salary." In a response, the CHP representative and Nevşin Mengü's father, Şahin Mengü, said: "Under the roof of the Grand National Assembly of Turkey, my daughter was alleged to have worked and received a salary in TRT. I also asked the General Manager of TRT about it. He said, 'We don't have paid staff.' Now the same issue is brought up here again. My daughter was a correspondent in Tehran for an international agency, and her reports appeared on TRT as well. Prove that my daughter received a salary from TRT for one day, and I resign from parliament today." Nevşin Mengü also talked about the issue in an interview:

Mr. Arınç may disagree with my father, may argue over an idea, but to make allegations that "she has worked for TRT", that's another thing: After all, I am a journalist, not a journalist attached to my father. I have worked in many places in the press and my father has never had an initiative in them. Even if I call him and ask "Should I do it?" he simply responds "You know better". We are very democratic in the family..

== Books ==
- İnsanın Düşünmekten Canı Yanar mı? (Everest Publications, 2017 - ISBN 6051852085)
- Herkes İstediği Gibi Yaşasın (İletişim Publishing, 2021 - ISBN 9789750530517)
