= Arafta =

2025 Turkish romantic drama television series

- Also known as: Bound by Fate
- Genre: Romantic drama; Melodrama
- Directed by: Oğuzcan Denizhan; Erdal Sarı
- Starring: İlsu Demirci; Emin Günenç; Kaan Arkat; Ezgi Dalgıç
- Country of origin: Turkey
- Original language: Turkish
- No. of seasons: 2
- No. of episodes: 135

Production
- Producer: Sevda Kaygısız
- Production locations: Istanbul, Turkey
- Camera setup: Multi-camera setup
- Running time: 60-70 minutes
- Production companies: Rains Pictures; GoQuest Media

Original release
- Network: Kanal 7 - (Season 1); YouTube - (Season 2)
- Release: November 21, 2025 – present

Arafta (internationally distributed as Bound by Fate) is a Turkish romantic drama television series produced by Rains Pictures and GoQuest Media. It stars İlsu Demirci as Mercan Yıldırım and Emin Günenç as Ateş Karahan. The story follows a man who seeks revenge against a family through a 187 days marriage arrangement that gradually develops into a romantic relationship.

The series premiered on YouTube in November 2025 before beginning its television broadcast on Kanal 7 in Turkey on 1 December 2025. Its first season concluded with its 100th episode in April 2026. The second season premiered on YouTube on 23 July 2026.

== Plot ==
Ateş Karahan is a businessman whose childhood experiences have left him seeking revenge against the family he holds responsible for his suffering. As part of his plan, he arranges a marriage with Mercan Yıldırım, the daughter of the family he considers his enemy. The marriage is intended to last 187 days.

Mercan becomes involved in the arrangement because of her family's financial difficulties and the circumstances surrounding her expected marriage to Nezir Keseroğlu. As Ateş and Mercan begin their life together, their relationship develops amid family disputes, secrets and conflicts. Their growing feelings complicate Ateş's original intentions, while other characters become involved in the struggle between revenge and love.

== Cast ==
- İlsu Demirci as Mercan Yıldırım
- Emin Günenç as Ateş Karahan
- Kaan Arkat as Nezir Keseroğlu
- Ezgi Dalgıç as Aslı Taner
- Pervin Mert as Müzeyyen Taner
- Erol Yavan as Haydar Yıldırım
- Işıl Mete as Nermin Yıldırım
- Fırat Kaya as Murat Yıldırım
- Çağrı Baylan as Cemal Ahlatlı
- İlay Karataş as Demet Keseroğlu
- Dilek Güler as Zahide Erman
- Alp İlkman as Yaşar Kaya
- Virat Sefer as Malik Hamed
- Bilge Yılmaz as Çiçek Güneş
- Betül Asel as Zehra Özsoy
- Arda Şanlı as Berat Güneş
- Şebnem Tumba Yıldırım as Binnaz Güneş

== Production ==
The series was developed through a partnership between Turkish production company Rains Pictures and Mumbai-based international distributor GoQuest Media. The project was announced in September 2025. The production brought together the companies behind the Turkish series Rüzgarlı Tepe and Kan Çiçekleri with GoQuest Media, which had previously worked on the international distribution of Turkish drama productions.

The series is directed by Oğuzcan Denizhan and Erdal Sarı. Its principal cast was announced in September 2025, with İlsu Demirci and Emin Günenç selected for the lead roles. Other cast members include Kaan Arkat, Ezgi Dalgıç, Erol Yavan, Pervin Mert and Işıl Mete.

== Broadcast and distribution ==
Arafta initially premiered on YouTube in November 2025. Its Turkish television premiere followed on Kanal 7 on 1 December 2025. The series was distributed internationally under the title Bound by Fate.

In January 2026, the series had reportedly reached more than one million YouTube subscribers within 43 days of its launch. Indian Television Dot Com reported that its first episode had received more than 18 million views and that the series had been licensed in several countries, including Israel, Romania, India, Indonesia, Pakistan and Latvia.

The first season ended with its 100th episode in April 2026. The conclusion was followed by an announcement that preparations for a second season had begun. The second season premiered on 23 July 2026 and was released through YouTube and licensed streaming platforms, including Prime Video in India, Vidio in Indonesia and IVI in Russia.

In October 2026, Hindustan Times reported that the series was being broadcast in 28 countries. It also interviewed lead actors Emin Günenç and İlsu Demirci about the production and its international audience.
