= Selen Soyder =

Turkish model and actress

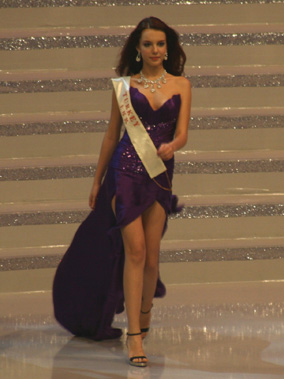
- Soyder at Miss World 2007 competition
- Born: Mükerrem Selen Soyder; 26 December 1986 (age 39); Alsancak, İzmir, Turkey
- Occupations: Actress, model, beauty queen activist
- Height: 1.78 m (5 ft 10 in)
- Spouse: Oren Frances
- Beauty pageant titleholder
- Title: Miss Turkey 2007
- Hair color: Light Brown
- Eye color: Dark Brown
- Major competitions: Miss Turkey 2007 (winner); Miss World 2007

Mükerrem Selen Soyder (born 26 December 1986) is a Turkish actress, activist, model and beauty pageant titleholder who was crowned Miss World Turkey 2007 and represented her country in the Miss World 2007 in Sanya, China.

== Career ==
Soyder has appeared in several series including Lale Devri, Yer Gök Aşk and Reaksiyon and Hangimiz Sevmedik.

== Personal life ==
Before the Ottoman Empire collapsed, in 1900, her family, of Turkish descent, immigrated to İzmir from Ioannina (now in Greece). In 2015, she married Turkish Jewish businessman Oren Frances.

== Filmography ==
Year	Title	Role	Notes
Turkey 2007	Miss Turkey (elections, camp, diaries, grand final)	Herself - Selen Soyder	Channel: Star TV
China 2007	Miss World	Herself - Selen Soyder	Representative
Turkey 2010	Yer Gök Aşk	Toprak Karagül	Leading role, Channel: FOX TV, TV series
Turkey 2011–2014	Lale Devri	Toprak Karagül Ilgaz	Leading role, Channel: FOX TV, TV series
Turkey 2014	Reaksiyon	Zeynep	Leading role, Channel: Star TV, TV series
Turkey 2016	Hangimiz Sevmedik	Itır Yeşil	Leading role, Channel: TRT 1, TV series
Turkey 2023	Kendi Düşen Ağlamaz	Sinem Devran	Channel: TRT 1, TV series

== Awards ==
Awards
Year	Award	Category	Work
2006	Miss Bikini of the Universe 2006	Best National Costume	
2013	19th Politics Magazine Awards	Female TV Star of the Year	Lale Devri
2013	4th Prestige Awards	Best Actress	Lale Devri

Awards
Preceded by Merve Büyüksaraç	Miss Turkey; 2007	Succeeded by Leyla Lydia Tuğutlu
