= Seksenler =

- Genre: Sitcom
- Screenplay by: Murat Aras; Birol Güven; Eray Yasin Işık
- Directed by: Birol Güven; Müfit Can Saçıntı; Bora Tekay
- Starring: Rasim Öztekin; Özlem Türkad; Şoray Uzun; Yasemin Çonka; Ayşe Tolga; Ceyhun Fersoy
- Narrated by: Şoray Uzun
- Theme music composer: Ümit Besen (1st season); Burcu Güven (2nd season)
- Opening theme: Ümit Besen - Okul Yolu; Burcu Güven - Geçmişin Kanatları
- Composers: Aydın Sarman; Burcu Güven
- Country of origin: Turkey
- Original language: Turkish

Production
- Producer: Birol Güven
- Production location: Istanbul
- Cinematography: Selçuk Ekmekçiler
- Running time: 120 minutes(6 seasons); 50-58 minutes (7th season)
- Production company: MinT Motion Pictures

Original release
- Network: TRT 1
- Release: January 24, 2012 – June 10, 2022

Seksenler is a Turkish nostalgic romantic comedy show started in 2012. The series takes place in the 80s Turkey and shows the daily life of a neighborhood. The series ended in 2022.
