= Kanıt (TV series) =

Turkish television series

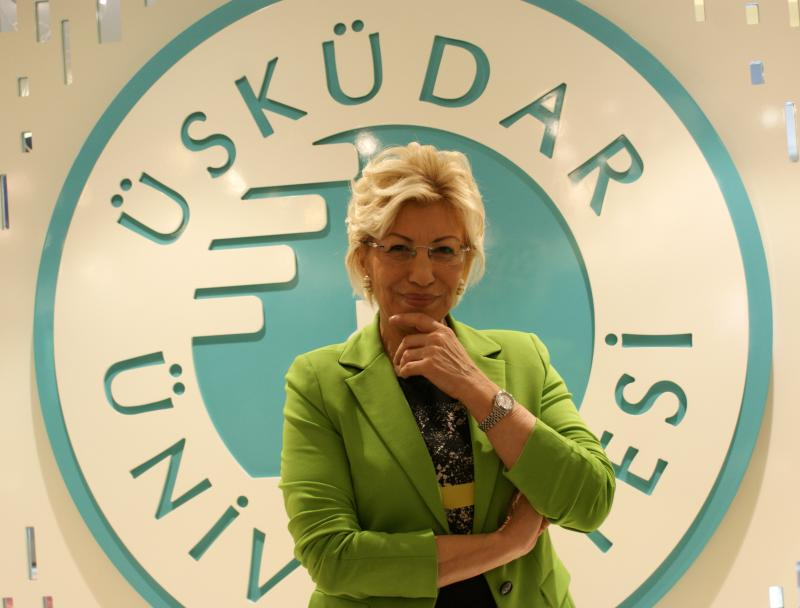
- Prof Sevil Atasoy
- Also known as: Evidence
- Genre: Detective
- Directed by: Biray Dalkıran
- Starring: Engin Benli- Deniz Celiloğlu- Ece Güzel and many others
- Country of origin: Turkey
- Original language: Turkish

Production
- Producer: Abdullah Oğuz
- Production company: ANS Production

Original release
- Network: Kanal D and Teve2
- Release: 2010 – 2013

Kanıt ("Evidence") is a Turkish television mystery series.

The 100-episode detective series was aired in 2010–2013 by Kanal D and reaired in 2017–2018 by Teve2. The format of the series differs from a typical detective series. It is claimed that the stories are partially based on true life stories. Professor Sevil Atasoy, an expert in forensic science is the narrator and interrupts during the story and explains the evidences and methods of the detectives. Her motto is "There is no perfect murder".

The producer is Abdullah Oğuz, the scenarist is Ahmet Saatcioğlu and the directors are Cem Sürücü and Biray Dalkıran. The main recurrent characters are the chief inspector, the inspector, crime scene investigator, the criminology laborant, the autopsy doctor and the informatics expert (After episode 40). Also two times a second inspector briefly joined the staff. Both the crime scene investigator and the criminologist were changed three times during the 100 episode.

Character	Name of the character	Actor	Episode no
Narrator	Sevil Atasoy	Sevil Atasoy	1-100
Chief Inspector	Orhan	Engin Benli	1-100
Inspector	Selim	Deniz Celiloğlu	1-100
Inspector	Ayça	Seben Koçibey	36-50
Inspector	Yaman	Tolga Karel	97-100
Autopsy Doctor	Ece	Ece Güzel	9-100
Criminology laborant	Zeynep	Sera Tokdemir	1-56
Criminology laborant	Bahar	Şule Zeytinci	57-65
Criminology laborant	Gamze	İnci Demirkaya	65-100
Crime scene investigator	Murat	Murat Çelik	9-58
Crime scene investigator	Kubilay	Kubilay Güleçoğlu	59-93
Crime scene investigator	Ejder	Ejder Murat Namlı	94-100
Informatics expert	Emre	Emre Özmen	40-100
