= Kendi Düşen Ağlamaz =

Turkish TV series

- Genre: Romantic comedy
- Based on: Ayşegül Çiçekoğlu
- Starring: Hakan Yılmaz; Selen Soyder; Enes Koçak; Eylül Tumbar
- Opening theme: "Yılmaz Taner – Aşk Kazası"
- Ending theme: "Yılmaz Taner – Aşk Kazası"
- Country of origin: Turkey
- Original language: Turkish
- No. of seasons: 1
- No. of episodes: 27

Production
- Executive producers: Nazlı Heptürk; Uğur Türkmen
- Production location: Istanbul
- Cinematography: Serdar Armutlu
- Running time: 120 minutes
- Production company: NG Medya

Original release
- Network: TRT 1
- Release: June 22, 2023 – January 4, 2024

Kendi Düşen Ağlamaz (translate title. One who falls does not cry) is a Turkish romantic comedy television series produced by NG Medya. It is set to premiere on June 22, 2023. The series is directed by İnci Balabanoğlu Ahıska and the screenplay is written by Gülbike Sonay Üte and Tuna Kıygı. The main cast includes Hakan Yılmaz, Selen Soyder, Enes Koçak, and Eylül Tumbar. The series is adapted from the novel of the same name by Ayşegül Çiçekoğlu, published in 2017.

== Plot ==
The story begin with Serkan entering Alize's life on her birthday. Little does Alize know that Serkan's arrival will either be a gift or a significant test for her. Alize plans a playful trick to teach her father a lesson when she learns he's getting married. However, her innocent intentions lead to unforeseen consequences. This incident thrusts Alize into a completely new life, presenting her with two choices: adapt to the new rules or give up.

Alize, driven by her stubbornness and determination, faces the equally strong-willed Serkan. As she strives to adapt to her new life, she uncovers Serkan's hidden secret. As she returns to her family home with hopes of regaining her old life, she is met with disappointment. Unbeknownst to Alize, Serkan and her father are collaborating, setting off a series of events that challenge her resilience.

As Alize navigates her new life, she continues working at a hotel, the only place where she feels independent. However, when she faces the prospect of losing even this sanctuary, she must fight back. As the series unfolds, secrets and unexpected events put their relationship to the test. Alize and Serkan must navigate a complex web of truths and lies, all while dealing with their growing feelings for each other.

== Filming location and overview ==
"Kendi Düşen Ağlamaz" was filmed in the historic district of Balat in Istanbul. This district is renowned for its colorful houses, cultural diversity, and vibrant ambiance. The show's filming location in Balat adds an extra layer of authenticity to its portrayal of the city's unique atmosphere.

=== Balat City ===
Balat is a historic district in Istanbul, known for its colorful houses, diverse cultural heritage, and vibrant atmosphere. Its streets are lined with picturesque buildings that reflect its Byzantine and Ottoman past. With a mix of Jewish, Armenian, and Greek influences, Balat is a melting pot of cultures, featuring synagogues, churches, and mosques. The district's artistic scene, local markets, and charming cafes add to its unique character. As a popular tourist destination, Balat offers an authentic experience that captures Istanbul's rich history and modern creativity.

== Production ==
The series is produced by NG Medya and marks the collaborative efforts of talented professionals in the Turkish television industry. İnci Balabanoğlu Ahıska serves as the director, while Gülbike Sonay Üte and Tuna Kıygı contribute their skills as screenwriters.

== Cast and characters ==
Main
Actor	Character
Enes Koçak	Serkan Darıca
Eylül Tumbar	Alize Soner Darıca
Hakan Yılmaz	Nurettin Soner
Selen Soyder	Sinem Devran
Supporting
Actor	Character
Hivda Zizan Alp	Serap Darıca
Yonca Şahinbaş	Esma Soner
Berat Yenilmez	Kadir Darıca
Derya Artemel	Türkan Darıca
Yiğit Kalkavan	Bahattin Korkmaz
Serhan Onat	Alp Demirkan
Beste Yaralı	Bahar
Çağla Boz	Tuğçe
Sevgi Aydınlı	Hazal
Bilgesu Kural	Deniz
Zeynep Bostancı	Ceren
Bükre Sena Sait	Buket
Aslı Akın Narcı	?
Yağmur Atmaca
Ezgi Can Kaya
Sait Genay	Hayri Darıca
Sema Çeyrekbaşı	Kezban Darıca
Serhat Duran	Cengiz
Yiğit Kağan Yazıcı	Sarp Darıca
?	Mesut
Alayça Öztürk Gidişoğlu	Mucize Yeter Darica
Guest
Actor	Character
Barış Yalçın	Mithat Demirkan
Ececan Gümeci	Nergis Özçelik

== Episodes ==
No.	Title	Directed by	Written by	Original release date
1	"Bölüm"	İnci Balabanoğlu Ahıska	Gülbike Sonay Üte	June 22, 2023
It all begins with the meeting of Alize, a beautiful girl who has grown up like princesses, and Serkan, a tough young man who has faced all sorts of hardships in life and had his dreams taken away. Their paths cross due to an accident... Serkan enters Alize's life on her birthday. Will Serkan become a gift of life for Alize, or will he become her greatest test? Unaware of the events that will unfold, Alize plans a little game to teach her father a lesson when she learns that he is getting married. Suddenly finding herself in a completely different life, Alize has two paths ahead of her. She must either play the game by the new rules or throw in the towel.
2	"Bölüm"	İnci Balabanoğlu Ahıska	Gülbike Sonay Üte	June 29, 2023
Returning to her old home with hopes of reuniting with her father and former life, Alize is met with a great disappointment. Unaware of the collaboration between Serkan and her father, she faces a tremendous setback. She's confronted with two difficult paths, and Alize chooses the more challenging one. Determined to return home and prove her unwavering commitment to both her original and new families, she refuses to give up. Alize's return to her new home shocks Serap as well. Feeling the need to eliminate her presence, Serap contemplates taking action, but she's left bewildered by a series of revelations. As Alize adapts to her new life, she continues working at the hotel, her only haven of independence. However, when she realizes that she's even losing this sanctuary...
3	"Bölüm"	İnci Balabanoğlu Ahıska	Gülbike Sonay Üte	July 6, 2023
Just as Alize's hidden marriage is about to be revealed by her friends, she manages to extricate herself from the situation in an unexpected way. With a surprise assist from Serkan, Alize has temporarily avoided a crisis. However, as time goes on, keeping this secret becomes increasingly challenging. On one side, Serap has begun to uncover the traps Alize has set for Serkan, determined not to let this matter rest. Alize has learned about her brother getting fired due to her actions, but if she also finds out he's working as a dishwasher...
4	"Bölüm"	İnci Balabanoğlu Ahıska	Gülbike Sonay Üte	July 13, 2023
Serkan has rescued Alize, but due to Bahattin's loose tongue, they find themselves in the midst of a new crisis. Alize struggles to explain Bahattin's inappropriate comments about her to her friends, but once again, Serkan comes to the rescue. To divert any suspicion, Serkan claims that he is in love with Alize in front of everyone. The people at the hotel are left shocked by this surprising revelation for now. Meanwhile, Hazal goes missing. After her last interaction, where she planned to meet someone she met online, her friends realize that she might be in trouble. Despite their efforts, they can't reach Hazal through her phone.
5	"Bölüm"	İnci Balabanoğlu Ahıska	Gülbike Sonay Üte	July 20, 2023
Both Alize and Serkan are deeply disappointed. They have both succumbed to their pride and made wrong moves. As their anger towards each other grows, the question remains: will this separation strengthen the unspoken feelings they can't even admit to themselves, or will their pride prevail? Meanwhile, Serap, Esma, and Bahar are overjoyed because their plans have worked perfectly. However, they haven't accounted for the unexpected moves from Kezban and Hayri. The two families are about to experience a tumultuous night full of events they never anticipated.
6	"Bölüm"	İnci Balabanoğlu Ahıska	Gülbike Sonay Üte	July 27, 2023
Alize, upon seeing Tuğçe's ploy, takes action and publicly declares her marriage to Serkan. Trying to stand tall in every situation, Alize will come to understand the weight of what has transpired when she's alone. During this process, Serkan will be by her side, providing support. Alize's friends are bewildered. They can't fathom why Alize kept her marriage a secret, and why Tuğçe resorted to such tactics. Although Alize feels embarrassed in front of her friends, she is deeply hurt and angry at Tuğçe. However, if Tuğçe apologizes, Alize will forgive her as well.
7	"Bölüm"	İnci Balabanoğlu Ahıska	Gülbike Sonay Üte	August 3, 2023
The revelations at the ceremony organized for Kadir raise suspicions in Alize's mind. She begins to piece together that Kadir was the one who saved her aunt Esma in the fire in Çatalca. When she voices her nagging doubts in front of everyone, she receives a surprising answer. Meanwhile, Serkan, who is compelled to hide the truths that closely concern Alize's life, starts to experience a deep sense of guilt towards her. As this guilt transforms into shame, he chooses to distance himself from Alize, gradually cutting off communication. Alize, on the other hand, struggles to comprehend this sudden change and quietly resents Serkan for it.
8	"Bölüm"	İnci Balabanoğlu Ahıska	Gülbike Sonay Üte	August 10, 2023
"Serkan helping with the engagement organization of Nurettin and Sinem deeply affects Alize. She believes that Serkan wants to distance himself from her and even end their marriage. However, Serkan is burdened with a strong sense of guilt and shame towards Alize due to the game they all played together. On top of it all, an unexpected surprise emerges – love. This throws him into confusion about what to do next. When Alize is on the brink of ending her marriage, a piece of advice from an unexpected source leads her to make a surprising decision.
9	"Bölüm"	İnci Balabanoğlu Ahıska	Gülbike Sonay Üte	August 17, 2023
The tensions between Alize and Serkan have started to thaw to some extent. Serkan realizes that he can't stay away from Alize. He confesses this to his father, even if not to Alize; he can't give up on her. Therefore, he won't be able to tell her about the game he played. However, this time Serkan has to hide something else from Alize. Alp has asked him to tutor him and made him promise not to tell anyone. Alize tries to figure out where Serkan is going secretly and at odd times, but she fails. Just as she's considering retaliating, driving him crazy out of jealousy, the opportunity she's been looking for presents itself. She receives an offer for a photoshoot.
10	"Bölüm"	İnci Balabanoğlu Ahıska	Gülbike Sonay Üte	August 24, 2023
Alize cleverly handles Bahar's move, determined not to give in. But Serkan also realizes his mistake and, with Nurettin's help, tries to win Alize's heart. While Serkan plans a camp to impress Alize, she teaches him a lesson by practicing tactics with her friends. During the camp organized by Bahattin, Alize and Serkan go on an adventure. Meanwhile, the Nurettin family also faces an unexpected adventure at Kadir's house and ends up staying the night.
11	"Bölüm"	İnci Balabanoğlu Ahıska	Gülbike Sonay Üte	August 31, 2023
Alize was about to tell Serkan the whole truth, but the weight of that truth overwhelmed her, and she fainted. Serkan and his friends rushed her to the hospital, where she recovered well. However, keeping the truth about her mother from Serkan put Alize in a moral dilemma. After getting out of the hospital, Serkan decided to make a life-changing decision. He would make his relationship with Alize real by marrying her, and they would fulfill all the things they had been putting off one by one..
