= Ilhami Çiçek =

Ilhami Çiçek (1954 in Oltu / Erzurum – June 14, 1983 in Erzincan) was a Turkish poet. He completed his primary and elementary education in Oltu. He graduated from Atatürk University, Faculty of Literature. His articles on folk literature were published in the local newspapers of Erzurum while he was a student at university. Afterwards, he worked for the review Edebiyat, which was directed by Nuri Pakdil, as a regular poet. His poem Otel Odası (The Hotel Room) came first at a poetry competition held by the review Adımlar.
