= Akasya Durağı =

Turkish television series

- Genre: Turkish film Comedy
- Developed by: Erler Film
- Written by: Resul Ertaş
- Directed by: Yaşar Seriner
- Starring: Zeki Alasya - Nuri; Nilgün Belgün - Eleni; Cezmi Baskın - Osman; Gülay Baltacı - Safiye; Levent Ülgen - Sinan; Aslı Altaylar - Gülbin; Onur Şan - Seyit; Makbule Akbaş - Zeyno; Suat Sungur - Mehmet; Binnur Şerbetçioğlu - Şükran; Evin Esen - Şaziment; Ümit Yesin - Duran; Şeyla Halis - Hediye; Kayhan Yıldızoğlu - Mazhar; Erol Günaydın - Ramazan; Pelin Sönmez - Dilek; Max Bendo - Obayana; Ayşegül Yamacı - Hülya; Cansu Gültekin - Nurten; Ayça İnci - Leyla; Arda Öziri - Tolga; Balamir Emren - Mert; Bahadır Hakim - Wang; Tevfik Yapıcı - Commissioner; Seyhan Arman - Nurcan; Sinem Ergin - Narin; Ateş Fatih Uçan - Ali Kemal; İlhan Daner - Talat
- Theme music composer: Aria; Bora Ebeoğlu; Cengiz Onural
- Opening theme: Akasya Yollar (Akasya Ways)
- Ending theme: Akasya Yollar (Akasya Ways)
- Country of origin: Turkey
- Original language: Turkish
- No. of seasons: 5
- No. of episodes: 174 (list of episodes)

Production
- Production location: Kavacık - Istanbul
- Camera setup: Mustafa Demirtürk
- Running time: 90 min
- Production company: Erler Film

Original release
- Network: Kanal D, Star TV
- Release: 14 July 2008 – 1 September 2012

Akasya Durağı was a Turkish comedy television series on Kanal D, in 2008.

== Overview ==
The story is about Nuri an old, wise and kind man and his taxi company called Akasya Durağı. As he is a retired man, the story circles mostly around the taxi drivers, the tea maker-office boy, their family and their friends, with situations where they end up in jail, in between mafia shootouts and in other comedic but also adventurous circumstances. Due to the series not having a common thread running throughout it, the story goes on as said.
