= Ayşegül Günay =

Turkish basketball player

Ayşegül Günay Aladağ
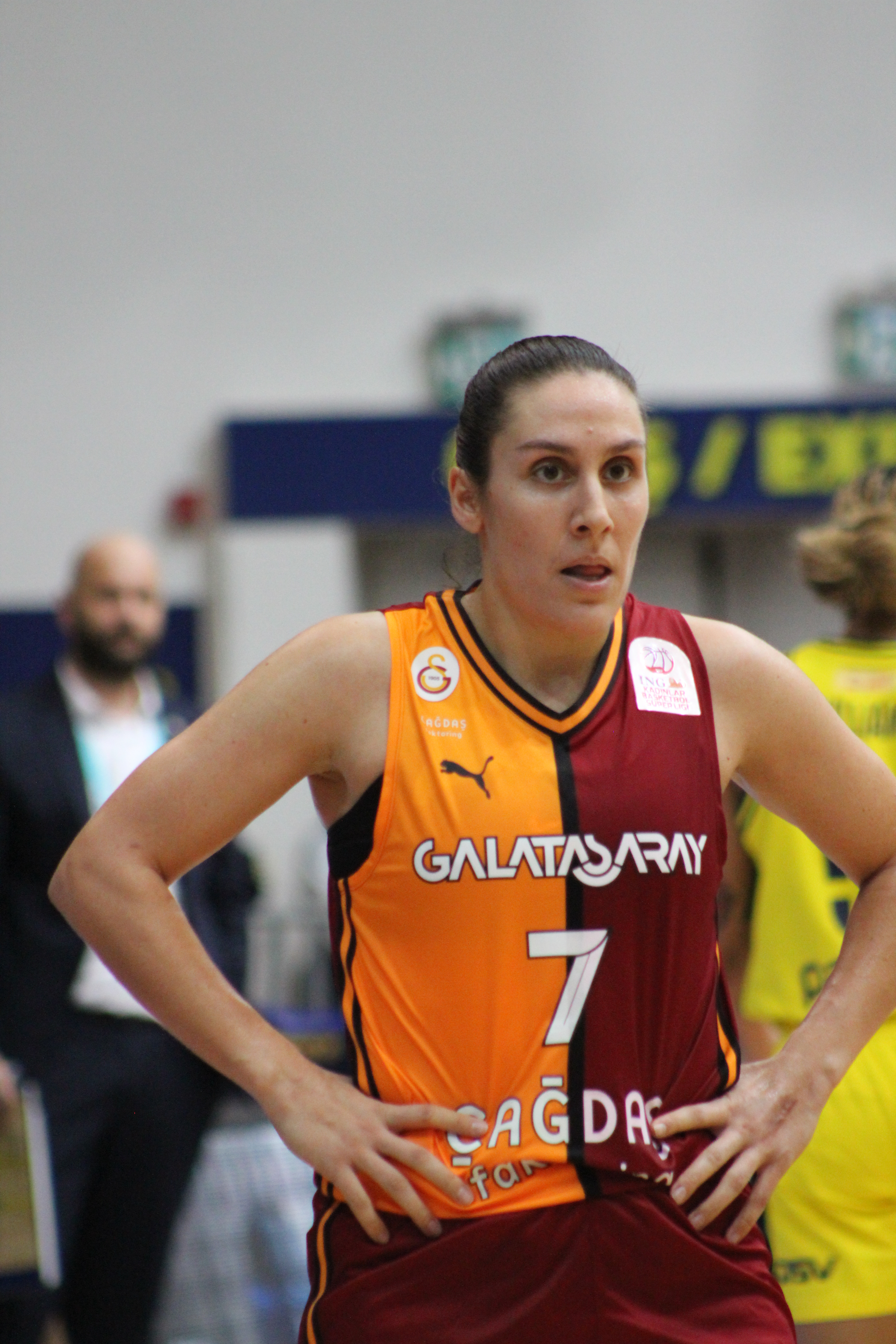

Botaş SK
- Position: Point guard

Personal information
- Born: October 26, 1992 (age 34) İzmit, Turkey
- Listed height: 5 ft 8 in (1.73 m)

Career information
- Playing career: 2007–present

Career history
- 2007–2008: Migros Spor
- 2008–2009: Fenerbahçe
- 2009–2011: Beşiktaş
- 2011–2012: Çankaya Üniversitesi
- 2012–2014: Kayseri Kaski
- 2014–2016: Galatasaray
- 2016–2017: Abdullah Gül Üniversitesi
- 2017–2018: Galatasaray
- 2018–2019: Hatay Büyükşehir Belediyespor
- 2019–2021: Kayseri Basketbol
- 2021: Hatayspor
- 2021–2023: Botaş SK
- 2023–2024: Kayseri Basketbol
- 2024–2025: Galatasaray
- 2025–: Botaş SK
Medals
Representing Turkey
EuroBasket
Bronze medal – third place	2013 France	Team
Europe Under-20 Championship
Bronze medal – third place	2012 Debrecen	Team

Ayşegül Günay Aladağ (born on October 26, 1992) is a Turkish female basketball player. The 1.72 m (5 ft 8 in) tall national plays point guard. Currently, she is a member of Botaş SK.

== Club career ==
Formerly, Günay played in the youth and junior teams of Migros Spor, Fenerbahçe, Beşiktaş and Çankaya University.

In May 2012, she signed with Turkish Women's Basketball League team Kayseri Kaski for two seasons.

On 26 July 2024, she signed with Galatasaray of the Turkish Women's Basketball Super League (TKBL).

Galatasaray club said goodbye to the player on May 6, 2025, by publishing a thank you message.

== International career ==
In 2012, she won the bronze medal with the Turkey national U-20 team at the Europe Under-20 Championship in Debrecen, Hungary. Günay was member of the national team, which took the bronze medal at the EuroBasket Women 2013 held in France.

== Achievements ==
Turkish Junior Women's Basketball Championship

- Fenerbahçe 2009 - (gold)
- Beşiktaş 2011 - (silver)

EuroCup Women

- Kayseri Kaski 2012-13 - (silver)

== Honors ==
- 2009 Turkish Junior Women's Basketball Championship - "Most Valuable Player"
