= List of awards and nominations received by Kıvanç Tatlıtuğ =

Kıvanç Tatlıtuğ awards and nominations
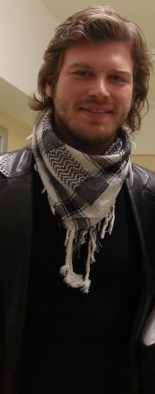
Awards and nominations
Award	Wins	Nominations
Yıldız Technical University	3	3
Golden Butterfly Awards	3	3
Beykent University	1	1
Seoul International Drama Awards	1	1
Latina Turkish Awards	2	2
Galatasaray University	3	3

Totals (Note: Certain award groups do not simply award one winner. They acknowledge several different recipients, have runners-up, and have third place. Since this is a specific recognition and is different from losing an award, runner-up mentions are considered wins in this award tally. For simplification and to avoid errors, each award in this list has been presumed to have had a prior nomination.)
- Wins: 42
- Nominations: 45

Kıvanç Tatlıtuğ is a Turkish actor known for his work predominantly in films, television and streaming series. Tatlıtuğ is one of turkey's highest-paid actors. He won the pageants of Best Model of Turkey and Best Model of the World in 2002 and is the recipient of 42 accolades into her credit. He has received Yıldız Technical University and Golden Butterfly Awards for his performances in Aşk-ı Memnu and Yıldız Technical University Best Actor for Kuzey Güney and Radio Television Journalists Association (RTGD Oscars) for Actor of the Year. Çanakkale Onsekiz Mart University for Most Admired TV Actor and 46th Turkish Film Critics Association Awards Best Actor Kelebeğin Rüyası for his markable intriguing performances respectively.

Tatlıtuğ further received the MEF High School Distinguishing Awards of the Year Most Distinguishing Actor and at Galatasaray University Best TV/Movie Actor of the Year for Çarpışma and Hadi Be Oğlum. He earned Altınyıldız Classics Stars of the Year Awards 2019's Most Admitted Television Actor. He established himself in comedy as 24th Sadri Alışık Awards won him the Most Successful Comedy Actor of the Year for Organize İşler 2: Sazan Sarmalı.

== Awards and nominations ==
Year	Award	Category	Nominee	Result
2002	Best Model of Turkey	-	Himself	Won
2002	Best Model of the World	-	Himself	Won
2009	Galatasaray University	Best Actor	Aşk-ı Memnu	Won
2009	İstek Özel Semiha Şakir High School	Best Actor	Aşk-ı Memnu	Won
2009	Istanbul Aydın University	Best Actor	Aşk-ı Memnu	Won
2009	Beykent University	Best Actor	Aşk-ı Memnu	Won
2009	36th Golden Butterfly Awards	Best Actor	Aşk-ı Memnu	Won
2010	Elle Style Awards	Most Stylish Actor	Aşk-ı Memnu	Won
2011	10th Yıldız Technical University Awards	Best Actor	Kuzey Güney	Won
2011	Radio Television Journalists Association (RTGD Oscars)	Actor of the Year	Kuzey Güney	Won
2012	Galatasaray University Business Club	Best TV Actor of the Year	Kuzey Güney	Won
2012	39th Golden Butterfly Awards	Best Actor	Kuzey Güney	Won
2012	11. ROTABEST Awards	Best TV Actor of the Year	Kuzey Güney	Won
2012	Esenler Municipality	Best TV Actor	Kuzey Güney	Won
2012	Burç Anadolu Communication Vocational High School Awards	Best Actor	Kuzey Güney	Won
2012	Quality of Magazine	Actor with the Best Quality	Kuzey Güney	Won
2012	Çanakkale Onsekiz Mart University	Most Admired TV Actor	Kuzey Güney	Won
2012	MGD 18th Golden Objective Awards	Best TV Drama Actor of the Year	Kuzey Güney	Won
2013	11th Yıldız Technical University Awards	Most Admired TV Actor	Kuzey Güney	Won
2013	20th ITÜ EMÖS Achievement Awards	Most Successful Actor of the Year	Kuzey Güney	Won
2013	Yeditepe University Awards	Best Actor	Kuzey Güney	Won
2013	TelevizyonDizisi.com The Best Awards	Best Actor	Kuzey Güney	Won
2013	MGD 19th Golden Objective Awards	Best Movie Actor	Kelebeğin Rüyası	Won
2013	18. Sadri Alışık Awards	Most Successful Actor of the Year	Kelebeğin Rüyası	Won
2013	MEF High School Distinguishing Awards of the Year	Most Distinguishing Actor	Kelebeğin Rüyası	Won
2014	Milliyet Sanat Journal Readers Awards	Best Actor	Kelebeğin Rüyası	Won
2014	46th Turkish Film Critics Association Awards	Best Actor	Kelebeğin Rüyası	Won
2016	GQ Turkey Awards	Best Actor	Cesur ve Güzel	Won
2017	TelevizyonDizisi.com The Best Awards	Best TV Couple (Cesur - Sühan)	Cesur ve Güzel	Won
2017	Sayidaty Magazine Awards	Best Actor	Cesur ve Güzel	Won
2017	Seoul International Drama Awards	Best Actor	Cesur ve Güzel	Won
2017	Dubai International Arab Festival	Best TV Couple	Cesur ve Güzel	Won
2017	44th Golden Butterfly Awards	Miracle Creators	-	Won
2018	Istanbul Kültür University (İKÜ) Career Honorary Awards	Most Admired Movie Actor of the Year	Hadi Be Oğlum	Won
2018	2nd Bosphorus Awards	Best Actor	Hadi Be Oğlum	Won
2018	DORinsight Awards	Best Actor of the Year	Çarpışma	Won
2018	17th Yıldız Technical University Awards	Most Admired TV Actor	Çarpışma	Won
2019	MEF High School Distinguishing Awards of the Year	Most Distinguishing Actor	Çarpışma	Won
2019	13th Galatasaray University The Best Awards	Best TV/Movie Actor of the Year	Çarpışma / Hadi Be Oğlum	Won
2019	24th Sadri Alışık Awards	Most Successful Comedy Actor of the Year	Organize İşler 2: Sazan Sarmalı	Won
2020	Altınyıldız Classics Stars of the Year Awards	2019's Most Admitted Television Actor	-	Won
