= Aşk-ı Memnu =

Aşk-ı Memnu may refer to:

- Aşk-ı Memnu (novel), an 1899 Turkish romance novel by Halit Ziya Uşaklıgil
- Aşk-ı Memnu (1975 TV series), a Turkish television miniseries, adapted from the novel
- Aşk-ı Memnu (2008 TV series), a Turkish romantic drama television series, adapted from the novel
