= Mensur Akgün =

Turkish professor

Mensur Akgün is a Turkish professor at Istanbul Kültür University, political analyst, columnist in Turkish daily Star and civil society activist.

== Early life ==
He finished his bachelor studies at the Middle East Technical University, Ankara in 1981 and received his master's degree from the University of Oslo, Norway in 1987. After finishing his doctoral studies at the Boğaziçi University, Istanbul in 1992, Mensur Akgün started publishing widely in national and international journals and newspapers. In addition to that, he has published a couple of own monographs and co-authored books. He has traveled extensively and participated in various international conferences as a speaker representing both academia and civil society.

== Career ==
Together with his colleague Sylvia Tiryaki, Mensur Akgün founded the Global Political Trends Center, an Istanbul based research institution, which is operating under the auspices of Istanbul Kültür University. He has also been the Director of the Foreign Policy Program at the Turkish Economic and Social Studies Foundation (TESEV) and the editor of the News Perspectives Quarterly (NPQ-Türkiye). Mensur Akgün teaches courses on international relations and Turkish foreign policy at the Faculty of Economic and Administrative Sciences of Istanbul Kültür University where he also holds position of chair of the Department of International Relations.

His geographic areas on interest include the Middle East, Cyprus, Turkey and Armenia.

== Publications ==
- Possible Scenarios in Cyprus: Assuming There is No Solution, Istanbul: TESEV Publications, February 2012.
- The Perception of Turkey in the Middle East 2011, Istanbul: TESEV Publications, February 2012. (Co-author)
- Ending the Isolation of Turkish Cypriots in Insight Turkey, Istanbul: SETA Foundation, Vol. 12, No. 1/2010, February 2010. (Co-author)
- Turks Are Now Puzzling over the EU's Back-Handed Compliment, Europe's World, No. 14, Spring 2010.
- Turkey: What Axis Shift, Le Monde Diplomatique, July 9, 2010.
- Finding Common Grounds - Rediscovering the Common Narrative of Turkey and Europe, Bratislava: RC SFPA, 2009. (Co-author)
- A Promise to Keep: Time to End the International Isolation of the Turkish Cypriots, Istanbul: TESEV Publications, June 2008. (Co-author)
- Quo Vadis Cyprus?, Istanbul: TESEV Publications, April 2005. (Co-author)
- The Annan Plan: A Missed Opportunity, World Security Network, 14 May 2004.
- Turkey in the Middle East, Turkey Investor: Journal of International Finance, November–December, 1998.
- Turkey and Russia: Burdened by history and myopia, Privatview, no.3, Winter 1997.
