= Ay Yapım =

Turkish TV production company

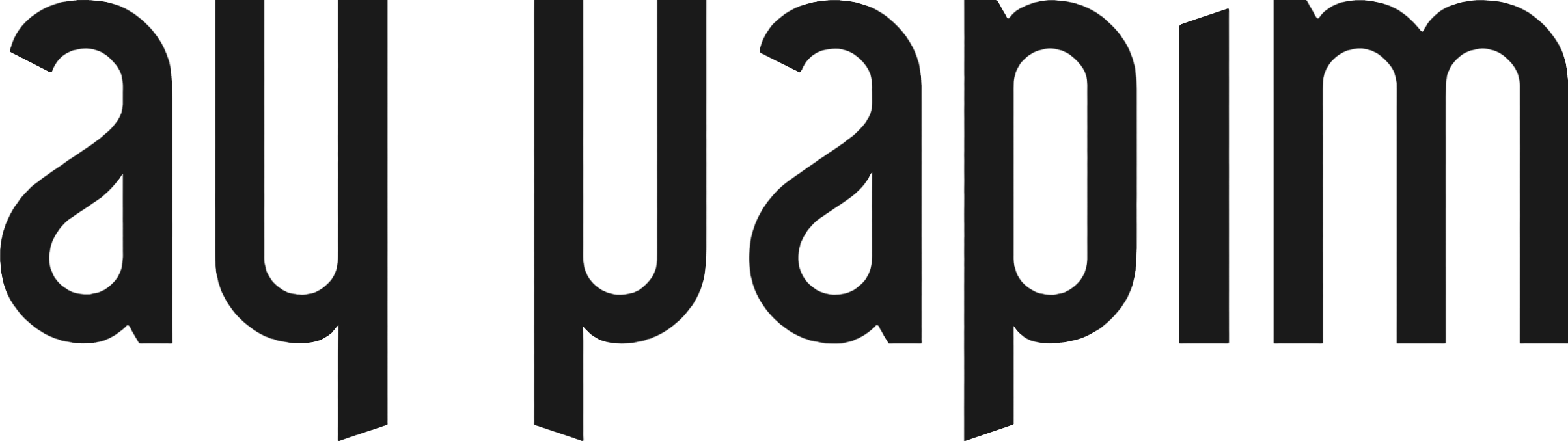

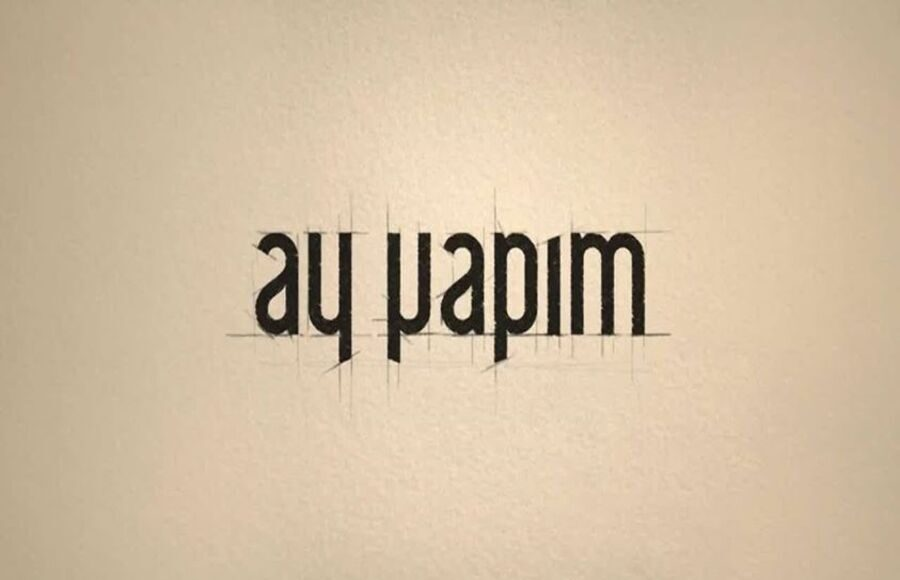
- Type: Media
- Founded: 2005
- Founder: Kerem Çatay
- Headquarters: Beşiktaş, Istanbul, Turkey
- Key people: Kerem Çatay
- Products: Film, Television series
- Website: ayyapim.tv

Ay Yapım is a media production company founded by Kerem Çatay in 2005. The company was once a Turkish partner of "Sparks Network", which has partners in 20 countries around the world. It is one of the biggest production companies in Turkey. Its head office is located in Istanbul, Turkey. Its productions are also broadcast on television in different countries. The script rights of the TV series Aşk-ı Memnu were purchased by Telemundo Television Studios broadcasting in the United States and re-shot under the name Pasión Prohibida.

Ay Yapım series and actors were nominated in different categories for the Seoul International Drama Awards. At the Seoul International Drama Awards, one of the prestigious organizations of the television world, Ezel series "Special Prize" in 2012 In 2014, Medcezir received the "Silver Bird" award in the Best Serial Drama category.

Son series, produced by Ay Yapım in 2012, is being re-shot under the name "Runner" to be broadcast on primetime by ABC channel in 2015. The Runner stars Paula Patton and Brent Sexton.

== Productions ==
=== TV, web series and movies ===
First and Last Broadcast	Series and Movies	TV Channel or platform
2027	Eve Giden Yol	Netflix
2024–present	Leyla: Hayat...Aşk...Adalet...	Now (Turkish TV channel)
2024–present	Kimler Geldi Kimler Geçti	Netflix
2024	Gaddar	FOX
2023–2024	Şahane Hayatım	FOX
2023	Ya Çok Seversen	Kanal D
2023-2024	Aile	Show TV
2022	Uysallar	Netflix
2022	Burning Days (Kurak Günler)	
2022–present	El Turco	Disney+
2021–2022	Üç Kuruş	Show TV
2021	Kuş Uçuşu	Netflix
2021–2024	Yargı	Kanal D
2021	Ada Masalı	Star TV
2020–2021	Alev Alev	Show TV
2020–2021	Menajerimi Ara	Star TV
2020	Nasipse Adayız	Movie
2020–2021	Aşk 101	Netflix
2020	Babil	Star TV
2020	Zemheri	Show TV
2019	Kuzgun	Star TV
2019	Özgür Dünya	Movie
2019	Bir Aşk İki Hayat	Movie
2018	Bizim İçin Şampiyon	Movie
2018	Şahin Tepesi	atv
2018–2019	Çarpışma	Show TV
2018	Şahsiyet	Puhu TV
2018	8. Gün	atv
2017–2018	Ufak Tefek Cinayetler	Star TV
2017–2021	Çukur	Show TV
2017–2018	Fi	Puhu TV
2017	Daha	Movie
2017	Bu Şehir Arkandan Gelecek	atv
2016–2017	Cesur ve Güzel	Star TV
2016–2017	İçerde	Show TV
2016–2017	Bana Sevmeyi Anlat	FOX
2016	Kırık Kalpler Bankası	Movie
2015	Delibal	Movie
2015	Analar ve Anneler	atv
2015–2017	Kara Sevda	Star TV
2015	Beş Kardeş	Kanal D
2014	Bi Küçük Eylül Meselesi	Movie
2014	Kurt Seyit ve Şura	Star TV
2014	Kara Para Aşk	atv
2013–2015	Medcezir	Star TV
2013	20 Dakika	Star TV
2012	Son	atv
2012–2015	Karadayı	atv
2011–2013	Kuzey Güney	Kanal D
2011–2012	Al Yazmalım	atv
2011	Dedemin İnsanları	Movie
2010–2012	Fatmagül'ün Suçu Ne?	Kanal D
2009–2011	Ezel	Show TV, atv
2008–2010	Aşk-ı Memnu	Kanal D
2007–2008	Menekşe ile Halil	Kanal D
2009–2010	Samanyolu	atv
2007–2009	Dudaktan Kalbe	Show TV
2007	Aşk Yeniden	TRT 1
2006–2010	Yaprak Dökümü	Kanal D

=== Television programs ===
- Sen Hakediyorsun
- Süpermarket
- Koş Dur Eğlen
- Kadının Gücü
- Kadınlar ve Erkekler
- Hülya Avşar ile Sen Bilirsin
- Ece ile Erkenden
- Aşk Oyunu
- Büyüle Beni
- Cenk mi Erdem mi?

== Awards ==
- Tuba Büyüküstün (20 Dakika) 2014, International Emmy Awards, Best Foreign Actress 2014 (Best Actress) -She reached the finals-
- Engin Akyürek (Kara Para Aşk) 2015, International Emmy Awards, Best Foreign Actor 2015 (Best Actor) -He reached the finals-
- Kara Sevda (TV series) 2017, International Emmy Awards, Best Foreign TV Series 2017 (Best Telenovela) -Won-
- Cesur ve Güzel (TV series) 2018, International Emmy Awards. Best TV Series 2018 (Best Telenovela) -Reached the Finals-
- Haluk Bilginer (Şahsiyet) 2019, International Emmy Awards, Best Actor 2019 (Best Model) -Won-
- Yargi (TV series) 2023, International Emmy Awards, Best Foreign TV Series 2023 (Best Telenovela) -Won-
