= Kıvanç Tatlıtuğ =

Turkish actor and model (born 1983)

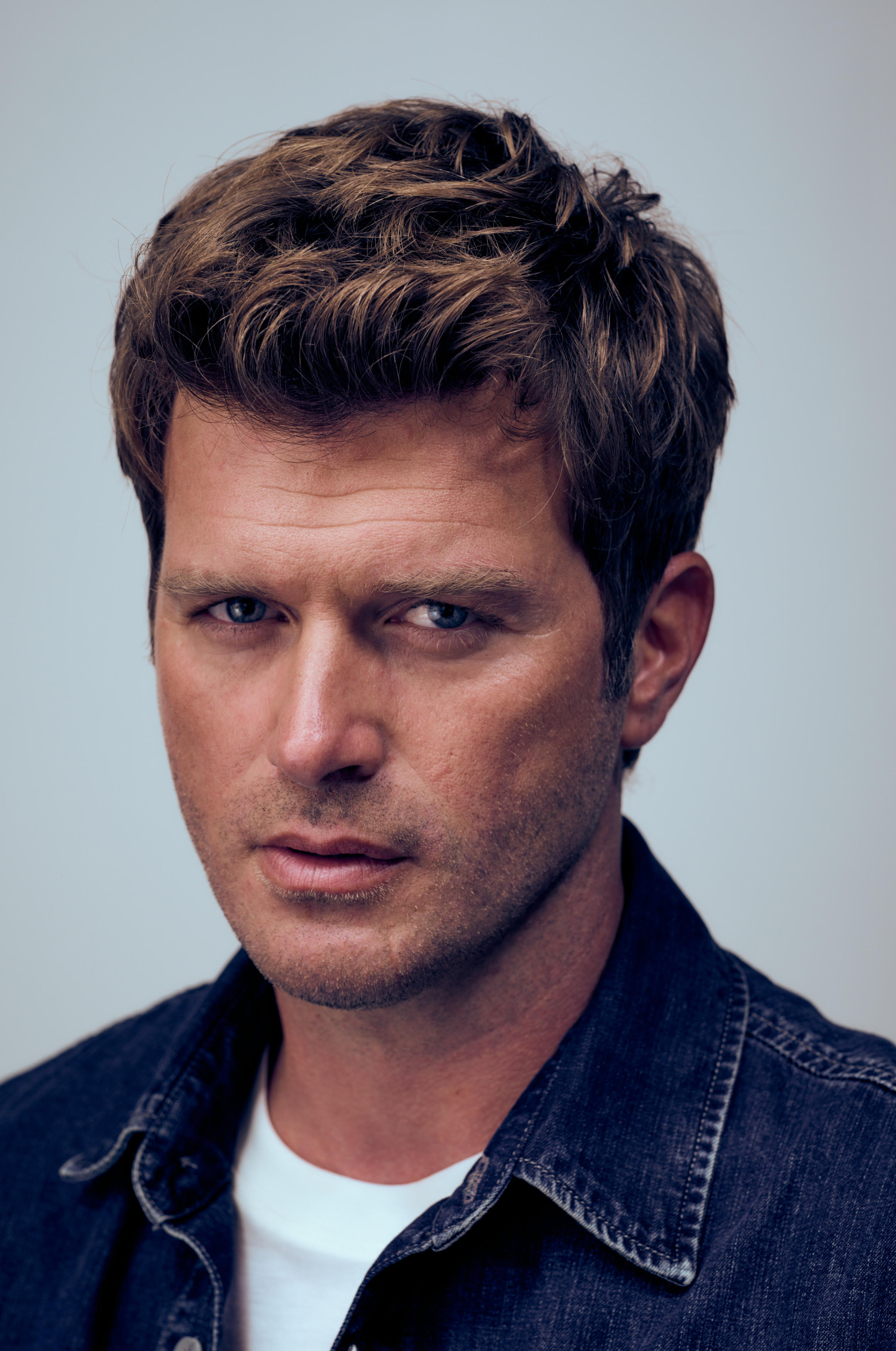
- Born: 27 October 1983 (age 43); Adana, Turkey
- Education: Istanbul Kültür University
- Occupations: Actor; model
- Years active: 2002–present
- Spouse: Başak Dizer (m. 2016)
- Children: 1
- Awards: Full list
- Website: https://www.kivanctatlitug.com

Kıvanç Tatlıtuğ (Turkish pronunciation: [kɯˈvantʃ ˈtatɫɯtuː]; born 27 October 1983) is a Turkish actor, model, and former basketball player. He has won several accolades, including four Golden Butterfly Awards for Best actor for his role in Aşk-ı Memnu (2009 and 2010), for his role in Kuzey Güney (2012) and for his role in Aile (2023), and for his role two Golden Butterfly awards for Best couple and a Yeşilçam Cinema Award. Tatlıtuğ won the pageants of Best Model of Turkey and Best Model of the World in 2002.

Tatlıtuğ has established himself as a leading actor of Turkey with roles in several of the highly successful television series, that includes Gumus (2005-2007), Menekşe ile Halil (2007–2008), Aşk-ı Memnu (2008–2010), Kuzey Güney (2011–2013), Cesur ve Güzel (2016–2017), and Aile (2023-2024), all of which garnered him critical acclaim and international recognition, portraying researcher Arman in the Netflix original series Into the Night (2021) and Yakamoz S-245 (2022).

== Early life and family ==
Tatlıtuğ was born on 27 October 1983, in Adana, to Erdem and Nurten Tatlıtuğ. His mother is Turkish from Edirne. His paternal grandfather is an Albanian from Pristina. His paternal grandmother is a Bosniak from Sarajevo. He has said that he was born and raised in Adana and that his family has had a bakery business in the city for more than a hundred years. He studied at Yenice Çağ Private High School, where he excelled in basketball. Due to his father's illness, the family moved to Istanbul so that his father could receive proper treatment. In Istanbul, he joined the Beşiktaş, Fenerbahçe, Ülkerspor, "Fiskobirlik", "Güney Sanayi", "Çukurova Kulübü", "Devlet Su İşleri" and "Tarsus Amerikan Kulübü" clubs as a professional U18 basketball player. Due to a dislocated leg, he left basketball. He graduated from Istanbul Kultur University in 2013. He married stylist Başak Dizer on 19 February 2016 at the Turkish embassy in Paris. The couple's first child, a son named Kurt Efe, was born in April 2022. A sculpture of Tatlıtuğ has been displayed in Madame Tussauds Istanbul.

== Career ==
=== Film career ===
He acted in the comedy film Amerikalılar Karadenizde 2, which was directed by Kartal Tibet. He provided the voice of Ken for the Turkish dubbed version of Toy Story 3. Tatlıtuğ played the poet Muzaffer Tayyip Uslu in the drama film Kelebeğin Rüyası with Farah Zeynep Abdullah. Kıvanç Tatlıtuğ won Yeşilçam Cinema Awards for Best Actor in a Leading Role and other awards for his performance as Muzaffer Tayyip Uslu.

=== Web series ===
He played as Arman in the Netflix surreal series Into the Night and Yakamoz S-245.

=== Television career ===
Kıvanç hosted some pageants and shows. He starred in Gümüş as the character Mehmet Şadoğlu. He had guest role in fantasy series Acemi Cadı of Turkish version "Sabrina Teenage Witch" with Merve Boluğur for second time. He has also starred in other shows such as Menekşe ile Halil, where he played alongside of Sedef Avcı. In the series Aşk-ı Memnu, Kıvanç shared the leading role with Beren Saat.

A turning point in Tatlıtuğ's career was when he played as Sekiz in Ezel. Since 2011, he has portrayed Kuzey Tekinoğlu in the Kanal D drama series Kuzey Güney, which ended in June 2013. He won two Golden Butterfly Awards for Best Actor in a Leading Role for his performance in Aşk-ı Memnu and "Kuzey ve Güney". He later acted in the historical series Kurt Seyit ve Şura with Farah Zeynep Abdullah in 2014 and in Cesur ve Güzel with Tuba Büyüküstün in 2016–2017 as Cesur Alemdaroğlu. With Elçin Sangu, Onur Saylak, he played in crime series Çarpışma.

== Filmography ==
=== Film ===
Year	Title	Role	Notes
2007	Amerikalılar Karadenizde 2	Muzaffer	Main role
2010	Toy Story 3 (Turkish dubbed version)	Ken	Voice acting
2013	Kelebeğin Rüyası	Muzaffer Tayyip Uslu	Main role
2018	Hadi Be Oğlum	Ali	Main role
2018	Organize İşler: Sazan Sarmalı	Sarı Saruhan	
2022	Âşıklar Bayramı	Yusuf	Main role
2023	Boğa Boğa	Yalın	Main role
2023	İstanbul İçin Son Çağrı	Mehmet	Main role

=== Streaming series ===
Year	Title	Role	Notes
2021	Into the Night	Arman	Guest; Season 2
2022	Yakamoz S-245	Arman	Main role
2026	Organize İşler: Karun Hazinesi	Sarı Saruhan	

=== Television series ===
Year	Title	Role	Notes
2005–2007	Gümüş	Mehmet Şadoğlu	Main role
2006	Acemi Cadi	Kıvanç Tatlıtuğ	One episode
2007–2008	Menekşe ile Halil	Halil Tuğlu	Main role
2008–2010	Aşk-ı Memnu	Behlül Haznedar	Main role
2010	Ezel	Sekiz/Ramiz Karaeski	Few episodes
2011–2013	Kuzey Güney	Kuzey Tekinoğlu	Main role
2014	Kurt Seyit ve Şura	Kurt Seyit	Main role
2016–2017	Brave and Beautiful	Cesur Alemdaroğlu	Main role
2018–2019	Çarpışma	Kadir Adalı	Main role
2023–2024	Aile	Aslan Soykan	Main role

== Awards and nominations ==
Awards and achievements
Preceded by Mehmet Akif Alakurt	Best Model of Turkey; 2002	Succeeded by Yusuf Şahan Gürdal
Preceded by Sylvain Larochelle	Best Model of the World; 2002	Succeeded by Stefan Alie
