= Toygar Işıklı =

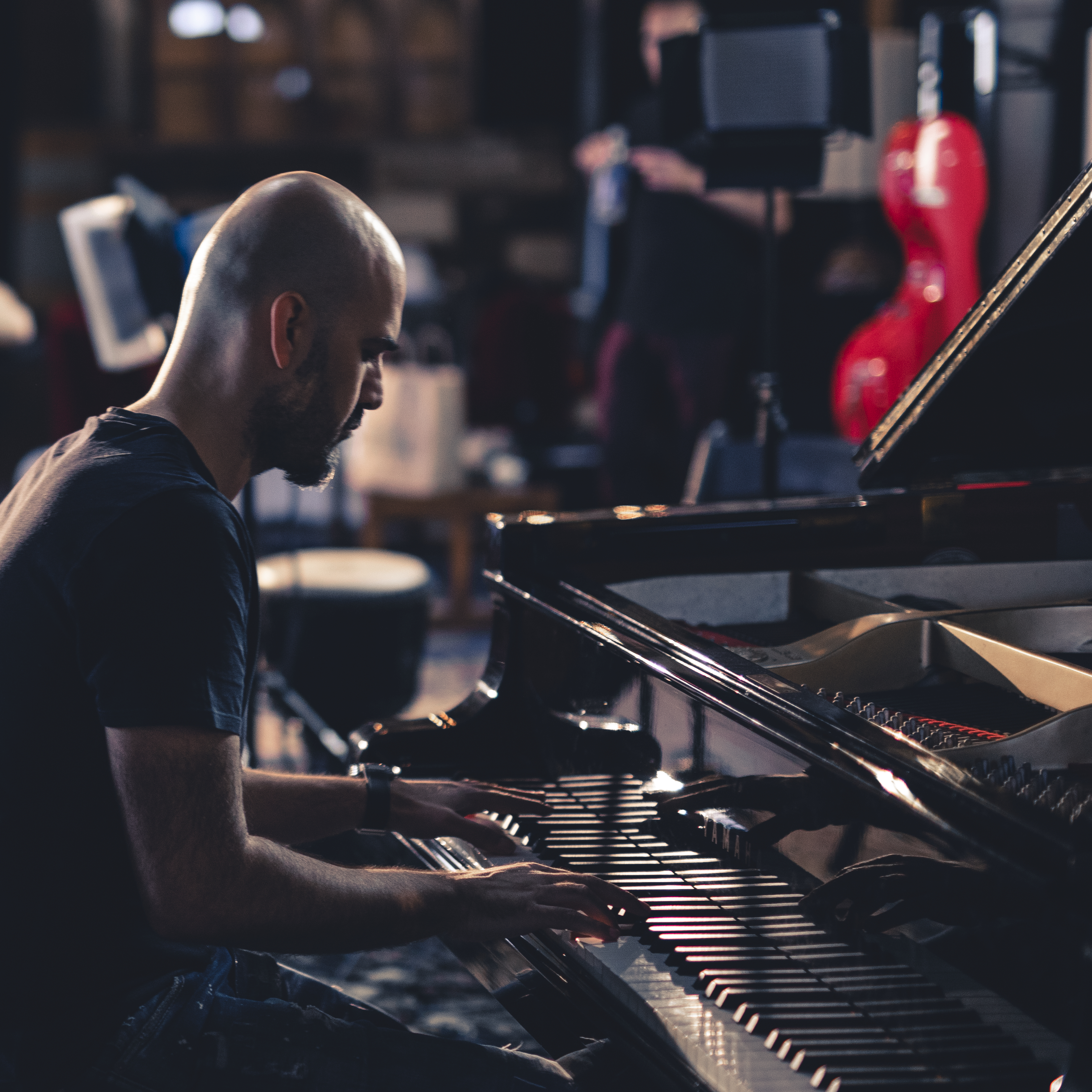

Background information
- Born: 16 April 1974 (age 52); Gölcük, Kocaeli, Turkey
- Genres: Film score
- Occupations: Composer, music producer, singer
- Instruments: Bass guitar, piano
- Label: Arven Records
- Website: www.toygarisikli.com

Toygar Işıklı (born 16 April 1974) is a Turkish film score composer, music producer, and singer.

== Life and career ==
Işıklı graduated from Gölcük Barbaros Hayrettin High School. He moved to Istanbul and attended an undergraduate major programme of vocal studies in Marmara University. He received his MA degree in the composition master programme from Istanbul Technical University MIAM (Center for Advanced Studies in Music). Currently, he is earning his postgraduate degree on musicology and music theory at Istanbul Technical University. Işıklı also studied film scoring at Berklee College of Music.

Throughout his education, he had the chance to collaborate with renowned composers and academicians such as Hasan Uçarsu, Kamran İnce, Pieter Snapper, David Osbon, Şehvar Beşiroğlu and Nail Yavuzoğlu for his research and work on jazz, 20th-century music, classical Turkish music and classical Western music.

He was a member of Objektif in 2007, on their fifth album, Sokağın Sesi.

Işıklı was a voting member for the 69th Annual Grammy Awards alongside with Büşra Kayıkçı, Edis Görgülü and Mert Demir.

== Film scores ==
Year	Title
2005	Türev
2011	Güzel Günler Göreceğiz (We Will See Good Days)
2013	Mahmut & Meryem
2014	Bi Küçük Eylül Meselesi (A Small September Affair)
2017	Sonsuz Aşk (Endless Love)
2017	Mahalle (Inside)
2017	Misafir (The Guest)
2017	Martıların Efendisi
2017	Acı Tatlı Ekşi
2018	Can Feda
2018	Kaybedenler Kulübü Yolda
2018	Bizim İçin Şampiyon
2022	Yolun Açık Olsun

== TV series soundtracks ==
Year	Title
2004	Gece Yürüyüşü
2005	Çeşm-i Bülbül
2006–2010	Yaprak Dökümü
2006	Kırık Kanatlar
2007	Tutsak
2007	Eksik Etek
2007–2009	Dudaktan Kalbe
2007–2008	Menekşe ile Halil
2008–2010	Aşk-ı Memnu
2009–2011	Ezel
2009–2010	Samanyolu
2010	Deli Saraylı
2010–2012	Fatmagül'ün Suçu Ne?
2011–2013	Kuzey Güney
2011–2012	Al Yazmalım
2012	Son
2012–2015	Karadayı
2013	20 Dakika
2013–2015	Medcezir
2014	Kurt Seyit ve Şura
2014–2015	Kara Para Aşk
2015	Beş Kardeş
2015–2016	Analar ve Anneler
2015–2017	Kara Sevda
2016–2017	İçerde
2016	Bana Sevmeyi Anlat
2016–2017	Cesur ve Güzel
2017	Bu Şehir Arkandan Gelecek
2017–2018	Yüz Yüze
2017–2018	Perdona nuestros pecados
2017–2021	Çukur
2018	8. Gün
2018	Şahin Tepesi
2018–2019	Çarpışma
2019	Kuzgun
2019	Juegos de poder
2020	Babil
2020–2021	Alev Alev
2021	Kahraman Babam
2021–2022	Üç Kuruş
2021–	Yargı
2021	Kuş Uçuşu
2024-2024	Gaddar
2024–present	Deha
2024–present	Leyla: Hayat… Aşk… Adalet...

== Other works ==
Year	Title
2005	Rengahenk (culture and art program)
2005	21 (culture and art program)
2007	Kadınlar ve Erkekler (TV program)
2008	Aşık Veysel "Benim Küçük Dünyam" (documentary)
2009	Aşk Üçgeni
2009	Hırçın Kız Kadife
2009	Hoşçakal Güzin

== Awards ==
Awards	Category	Film & TV score
Rotary Club Rotabest Awards	Best Soundtrack	Yaprak Dökümü
İsmail Cem Television Awards	Best Soundtrack	Ezel
16. Kral TV Awards	Best Soundtrack	Ezel
Mugla University Golden Carrier Awards	Best Singer	Toygar Işıklı
2. Antalya Television Awards	Best Soundtrack	Ezel
Ondokuz Mayıs University Media Awards	Best Solo Album	Toygar Işıklı
İstanbul Culture University	Best Soundtrack	Kuzey Güney
Siyaset Bulletin Awards	Best Composer	Toygar Işıklı
Turkish Student Council	Best Soundtrack	Kuzey Güney
Olay Fm Radio Awards	Best Male Singer	Toygar Işıklı
Ayaklı Gazete Awards	Best Soundtrack	Karadayı
Women Council Awards	Best Soundtrack	Karadayı
Union of local and national channels Awards	Best Soundtrack	Karadayı
Boğaziçi University Radio Boğaziçi Awards	Best Soundtrack	Kuzey Güney
Yeditepe Üniversity Awards	Best Soundtrack	Medcezir
4. Pal Fm Radio Awards	Best Soundtrack	Medcezir
Ayaklı Gazete Awards	Best Soundtrack	Medcezir
Gazi University Awards	Best Soundtrack	Medcezir
Boğaziçi University Radio Boğaziçi Awards	Best Soundtrack	Medcezir
41. Golden Butterfly Awards	Best Soundtrack	Medcezir
20. Kral TV Awards	Best Soundtrack	Medcezir
25. International Ankara Film Festival Awards	Best Film Score	A Small September Affair
14.Salento Film Festival Awards SIFF Italy	Best Film Score	A Small September Affair
Istanbul Fm 20. Anniversary Awards	Best Soundtrack	Medcezir
Türk Tıp Öğrencileri Birliği Awards	Best Soundtrack	Medcezir
Karadeniz Technical University Awards	Best Soundtrack	Medcezir
ZEREV Awards	Best Soundtrack	Medcezir
Bilkent Film Festival Awards	Best Film Score	A Small September Affair
Boğaziçi University Radio Boğaziçi Awards	Best Soundtrack	Kara Para Aşk
42. Golden Butterfly Awards	Best Soundtrack	Medcezir
Yildiz Technical University	Best Soundtrack	İçerde
Turkish Medical Students Association	Best Soundtrack	İçerde
Karadeniz Technical University	Best Soundtrack	İçerde
Gelişim University	Best Soundtrack	İçerde

== Discography ==
- Asaf (soundtrack 2024, Arven Records)
- As the Crow Flies (soundtrack 2024, Arven Records)
- Gaddar (soundtrack 2024, Arven Records)
- Magarsus (soundtrack 2023, Arven Records)
- Aile (soundtrack 2023, Arven Records)
- Darmaduman (soundtrack 2022, Arven Records)
- Yolun Açık Olsun (soundtrack 2022, Arven Records)
- Üç Kuruş (soundtrack 2022, Arven Records)
- Yargı (soundtrack 2022, Arven Records)
- Flames of Fate (soundtrack 2021, Arven Records)
- Çukur-Season 4 (soundtrack 2021, Arven Records)
- Çukur-Platinum Edition (soundtrack 2020, Arven Records)
- Babil (TV series soundtrack 2020, Arven Records)
- Kuzgun (soundtrack 2019, Arven Records)
- Çarpışma (TV series soundtrack 2019, Arven Records)
- Çukur-Season 1&2&3 (soundtrack 2019, Arven Records)
- Şahin Tepesi (TV series soundtrack 2019, Arven Records)
- Bizim İçin Şampiyon (original film score 2019, Arven Records)
- Çukur-Live (soundtrack 2018, Arven Records)
- Can Feda (original film score 2018, Arven Records)
- İçerde-Deluxe Edition (TV series soundtrack 2018, Arven Records)
- 8. Gün (TV series soundtrack 2018, Arven Records)
- Acı Tatlı Ekşi (original film score 2018, Arven Records)
- The Guest (original film score 2019, Arven Records)
- Kaybedenler Kulübü Yolda (original film score 2018)
- Martıların Efendisi (original film score 2018)
- İçerde - Live (soundtrack 2017, Arven Records)
- Cesur ve Güzel (TV series soundtrack 2017, Arven Records)
- Bu Şehir Arkandan Gelecek (TV series soundtrack 2017, Arven Records)
- Sonsuz Aşk (original film score 2017, Arven Records)
- Bana Sevmeyi Anlat (soundtrack 2016, Arven Records)
- Kara Sevda (soundtrack 2016, Arven Records)
- Analar ve Anneler (soundtrack 2015, Arven Records)
- Med Cezir (soundtrack 2015, Arven Records)
- Beş Kardeş (soundtrack 2015, Arven Records)
- Son (soundtrack 2015, Arven Records)
- Kara Para Aşk (soundtrack 2015, Arven Records)
- Karadayı (soundtrack 2015, Arven Records)
- Kurt Seyit ve Şura (soundtrack 2014, Arven Records)
- Fatmagül'ün Suçu Ne ? (soundtrack 2014, Arven Records)
- Menekşe ile Halil (soundtrack 2014, Arven Records)
- Toygar Işıklı Jenerik Müzikleri (soundtrack 2014, Arven Records)
- bi Küçük Eylül meselesi (soundtrack 2014, Arven Records)
- Mahmut ile Meryem (soundtrack 2014, Arven Records)
- Ezel (soundtrack 2014, Arven Records)
- Kuzey Güney (soundtrack 2013, Arven Records)
- 20 Dakika (soundtrack 2013, Arven Records)
- Hayat Gibi (solo album 2013, Poll Production)
- Aşk-ı Memnu (soundtrack 2012, Arven Records)
- Sonunda (solo album 2010, Sony Music)
- Dudaktan Kalbe (soundtrack 2008, Emi Music)
- Yaprak Dökümü (soundtrack 2007, DMC)
- Gaddar
