= Markíza Doma =

- Country: Slovakia
- Broadcast area: Slovakia
- Headquarters: Záhorská Bystrica, Bratislava

Programming
- Language: Slovak
- Picture format: 16:9 (576i, SDTV), 16:9 (1080i, HDTV)

Ownership
- Owner: Central European Media Enterprises (through PPF)
- Sister channels: Markíza; Markíza Dajto; Markíza KRIMI; Markíza Klasik; Markíza International

History
- Launched: 31 August 2009 (17 years ago)
- Former names: TV Doma (31 August 2009 – 10 August 2022)

Links
- Website: doma.markiza.sk

Availability

Terrestrial
- DVB-T: MUX 4 (Pay) (SD)

Streaming media
- Archív Markíza: Watch live (Slovak only)
- VOYO: Watch live (Slovak only)

Markíza Doma (Doma means "At home" in Slovak) is a Slovak television channel broadcasting mostly telenovelas. The channel was launched on 31 August 2009 as the first sister channel of TV Markíza focused on female audience. In 2012, Doma was refocused to "appeal to the entire family".

Doma is owned by Central European Media Enterprises (through PPF) and currently has a reach of approximately 95% of the country's 5.4 million people and broadcasts 24 hours per day. In the second half of 2022, the viewership share of Doma in the 12–54 group was 3.52%.

Television Doma programing includes CME's own regionally produced programs, highly rated European series, the most popular and newest Latin American, Turkish and Indian soap-operas, infotainment shows and lifestyle programs, romantic themed Fridays & Saturdays with romantic movies made by novels by Rosamunde Pilcher, Inga Lindström, Lilly Schönauer, Danielle Steel, Emilie Richards, Barbara Wood, Utta Danella, Charlotte Link, Robin Pilcher, Katie Fforde, Dora Heldt and Harlequin movies, as well as a la mode Sundays with American or European movies.

== Original programming ==
The first locally produced content was a daily lifestyle talk show L.O.V.E hosted by Silvia Petöová, Mária Čírová and Ján Hargaš. It started in April 2010 in late prime time and from September 2010 it was moved to fringe time. Also the weekly gossip news called Up on the Roof was moved there from TV Markíza taking the slot on Friday evening. However, both shows were canceled in December 2010 due to the austerity measures.

The preparation of the first Slovak locally produced soap opera called Only Love which is based on CME's Romanian soap opera Numai Iubirea has started in early 2010. During the preparation, the management decided to change the plot to be more suitable for mainstream viewers and to air the new series on TV Markíza under the name Second Wind. However, in December 2011 it has been revealed that the new romance TV series of 80 episodes will be finally broadcast on TV Doma to strengthen its position on the market. Broadcast of the series started on 2 January 2012 taking the slot on 9 pm. In April 2012 it has been revealed that due to the big success of the series, the new original plot for the second season of 64 episodes has been written by Slovak screenwriters. Broadcast of the second season started on 17 September 2012 taking the slot on 8 p.m. and concluded on 18 January 2013.

Original title	International Title	Series Premiere	Series Finale	Second Run	Third Run
Second Wind	Second Chance	2 January 2012	31 May 2012	8 July 2014 – 26 September 2014	9 October 2017 – 2 February 2018
Second Wind 2	Second Chance 2	17 September 2012	18 January 2013	5 February 2018 – 3 May 2018	

== Telenovelas ==
Original title	Alternate Title/Translation	Series Premiere	Series Finale	Second Run	Third Run	Fourth Run	Fifth Run	Sixth Run	Seventh Run
(Mexico) Alborada	Fateful Meeting	31 August 2009	8 January 2010						
(Mexico) Amor en Custodia	Forbidden Passion	28 January 2013	13 August 2013	4 March 2014 – 12 September 2014					
(Colombia) (United States) Café con Aroma de Mujer	The Scent of Passion	10 July 2024	9 September 2024	planned					
(Mexico) Camaleones	Rebels in High School	15 February 2011	22 August 2011	20 January 2014 – 25 July 2014					
(Mexico) Cuando Seas Mía	When You Will Be Mine	3 December 2009	2 April 2010	13 February 2012 – 14 December 2012	7 January 2014 – 20 June 2014	1 August 2016 – 20 January 2017	19 March 2018 – 31 August 2018		
(Mexico) Cuidado con el Ángel	Unconventional Angel	17 August 2010	28 July 2011	14 November 2013 – 14 May 2014					
(Mexico) Destilando Amor	Pure Love	1 February 2011	22 July 2011	30 July 2012 – 14 December 2012					
(United States) ¿Dónde está Elisa?	Missing	15 May 2014	5 September 2014	18 May 2015 – 24 July 2015					
(Colombia) (United States) Doña Bárbara	Doña Bárbara	22 October 2010	15 July 2011	7 January 2014 – 6 August 2014					
(Mexico) Duelo de Pasiones	Clash of Passions	5 April 2010	4 June 2010						
(United States) (Colombia) El Cuerpo del Deseo	Body Desire	1 March 2010	15 September 2010	14 August 2013 – 11 March 2014	2 April 2024 – 9 July 2024	planned			
(United States) El Rostro de Analía	The True Face of Passion	4 January 2010	26 November 2010						
(Mexico) Entre el amor y el odio	Between Love and Hatred	16 September 2010	31 January 2011	12 March 2014 – 1 September 2014					
(Mexico) Esmeralda	Esmeralda	4 December 2017	22 March 2018	29 June 2020 – 22 October 2020					
(Mexico) Gitanas	Gypsy Women	5 June 2017	6 October 2017						
(Mexico) La Fuerza del Destino	The Power of Destiny	1 June 2015	7 August 2015	18 February 2016 – 29 April 2016					
(Mexico) La Madrastra	The Stepmother	31 August 2009	12 February 2010	2 April 2012 – 14 September 2012					
(United States) (Colombia) (Spain) La Reina del Sur	Queen of The South	6 July 2015	27 August 2015						
(Colombia) La Tormenta	Love Temptation	7 June 2010	21 October 2010	4 June 2012 – 18 April 2013					
(Colombia) (United States) Los Herederos del Monte	War of The Montes	30 September 2013	3 January 2014	10 November 2015 – 17 February 2016					
(Mexico) Mar de amor	Sea of Love	10 August 2015	18 December 2015	2 May 2016 – 23 August 2016					
(United States) Más Sabe el Diablo	In The Arms of The Devil	29 November 2010	7 September 2011	2 March 2015 – 24 November 2015					
(Mexico) Mi Pecado	Family Curse	8 September 2011	16 February 2012	2 March 2015 – 15 May 2015					
(Argentina) Muñeca Brava	Wild Angel	18 July 2022	27 January 2023	2 May 2025 – 6 November 2025					
(Colombia) (United States) Niños Ricos, Pobres Padres	Young, Beautiful, Sinful	30 April 2012	2 November 2012	28 July 2014 – 12 November 2014					
(Colombia) Pasión de Gavilanes	Hidden Passion	31 August 2009	2 December 2009	25 July 2011 – 9 February 2012	2 January 2013 – 18 July 2013	8 September 2014 – 30 January 2015	23 January 2017 – 2 June 2017	30 January 2023 – 16 June 2023	10 September 2024 – 31 January 2025
(Colombia) Pasión de Gavilanes 2	Hidden Passion 2	19 June 2023	14 August 2023	3 February 2025 – 31 March 2025					
(Mexico) Rebelde	Rebels	31 August 2009	14 February 2011	23 August 2011 – 21 June 2012 (season 1); 31 May 2013 – 17 January 2014 (season 2–3)					
(Mexico) Rosalinda	Rosalinda	15 August 2023	9 October 2023	7 November 2025 – January 2026					
(Mexico) Sortilegio	Love Spell	12 April 2010	16 August 2010	10 July 2013 – 13 November 2013					
(Mexico) Soy Tu Dueña	Unbreakable Valentina	4 January 2016	1 April 2016	24 August 2016 – 30 November 2016					
(Argentina) Sos Mi Vida	Wounds of Love	14 June 2010	2 May 2011	10 October 2023 – 27 March 2024	planned				
(Colombia) Te Voy a Enseñar a Querer	I Will Teach You to Love	15 February 2010	13 August 2010						
(Mexico) Teresa	Teresa	22 April 2013	30 September 2013	27 July 2015 – 9 November 2015					
(Mexico) Tres veces Ana	Three Sisters	11 September 2017	8 December 2017	11 January 2021 – 9 April 2021					
(Mexico) Triunfo del Amor	Triumph of Love	2 February 2015	29 May 2015	4 April 2016 – 29 July 2016					
(Colombia) (United States) Victoria	Victoria	31 August 2009	25 May 2010	5 November 2012 – 30 May 2013					

== Other telenovelas ==
Original title	Alternate Title/Translation	Series Premiere	Series Finale	Second Run	Third Run	Fourth Run
(Turkey) Adını Feriha Koydum	Feriha	18 August 2014	29 January 2015	2 January 2018 – 12 July 2018		
(Romania) Aniela	Aniela: The Story of Forbidden Love	8 January 2011	13 October 2012	20 July 2013 – 5 October 2014		
(Turkey) Anne	Mothers and Daughters	2 January 2018	15 March 2018	22 June 2020 – 3 September 2020		
(Turkey) Asi	Pearl of The Orient	3 June 2013	6 February 2014	15 September 2014 – 27 February 2015		
(Turkey) Asla Vazgeçmem	I Will Never Leave You	19 March 2018	8 August 2018	7 September 2020 – 17 February 2021		
(Turkey) Aşk Mantık İntikam	Love, Reason, Revenge	24 August 2022	7 November 2022	20 June 2024 – 3 September 2024		
(Turkey) Aşk ve Ceza	Love and Punishment	21 January 2013	30 May 2013	7 August 2014 – 31 October 2014		
(Turkey) Aşk Yeniden	Love at Second Sight (season 1); Love at Second Sight (season 2)	11 January 2016; 10 July 2017	18 February 2016; 21 December 2017	5 June 2017 – 6 July 2017 (season 1); 1 January 2019 – 20 June 2019 (season 2)		
(Turkey) Aşk-ı Memnu	Forbidden Love	2 February 2015	24 June 2015	12 September 2016 – 8 May 2017		
(Turkey) Babam ve Ailesi	Happiness of My Children	11 February 2019	14 March 2019	22 February 2021 – 25 March 2021		
(Russia) Bednaya Nastya	Poor Nastya	4 March 2012	23 June 2013	10 January 2015 – 12 December 2015		
(Turkey) Binbir Gece	Thousand and One Nights	12 March 2011	26 November 2011	7 January 2013 – 30 August 2013	18 August 2014 – 19 December 2014	11 January 2016 – 8 September 2016
(Turkey) Bizim Hikaye	The Story of our Family	6 January 2025	28 May 2025	planned		
(Turkey) Canım Annem	A Mother's Love (season 1)	29 May 2025	26 August 2025			
(Turkey) Cennet'in Gözyaşları	Cennet	30 March 2020	12 October 2020	5 October 2022 – 16 December 2022		
(Turkey) Cesur ve Güzel	Brave and Beautiful	31 August 2020	7 December 2020	2 January 2023 – 13 March 2023		
(Turkey) Dila Hanım	Dila	3 August 2015	26 November 2015	16 July 2018 – 30 January 2019		
(India) Diya Aur Baati Hum	Sandhya – the Light of My Life (season 1–6)	2 January 2017	15 September 2017	27 April 2020 – 23 December 2020		
(Russia) Dorogaya Masha Berezina	Masha	12 May 2012	2 December 2012	2 April 2013 – 11 July 2013	12 November 2013 – 28 February 2014	
(Turkey) Elveda Derken	Tears of the Bosphorus	12 April 2011	17 August 2011	22 July 2013 – 21 December 2013		
(Turkey) Erkenci Kuş	With Head in the Clouds	18 April 2022	23 August 2022	26 February 2024 – 19 June 2024		
(Turkey) Evlilik Hakkında Her Şey	Broken Promise	29 January 2024	12 April 2024	planned		
(Turkey) Ezel	Ezel	10 April 2012	3 December 2012	7 April 2014 – 6 August 2014		
(Turkey) Fatmagül'ün Suçu Ne?	Fatmagül	31 March 2014	14 August 2014	22 May 2017 – 21 December 2017		
(Turkey) Fazilet Hanım ve Kızları	The Daughters of Mrs. Fazilet	5 August 2024	3 December 2024	planned		
(Turkey) Gümüş	In The Embrace of Silk	2 August 2011	5 April 2012	2 September 2013 – 24 June 2014		
(Turkey) Hercai	Fettered Butterfly	4 January 2021	16 August 2021	14 March 2023 – 8 September 2023		
(Romania) Inimă de Tigan	Gipsy Heart	18 July 2011	1 June 2012			
(Turkey) İstanbullu Gelin	Unwished Bride (season 1–2); Unwished Bride (season 3)	13 August 2018; 1 July 2019	7 February 2019; 19 December 2019	7 June 2021 – 3 March 2022		
(Turkey) İyilik		planned	planned			
(Germany) Julia – Wege zum Glück	Julia – Ways to Happiness	31 August 2009	21 May 2010	5 March 2012 – 30 July 2012		
(Turkey) Kaderimin Yazıldığı Gün	A Part of Me	22 February 2016	29 June 2016	10 February 2020 – 18 June 2020		
(Turkey) Kadın	The Power of a Woman (season 1–2)	18 March 2019	5 November 2019	7 March 2022 – 29 July 2022		
(Turkey) Kara Sevda	Endless Love (season 1); Endless Love (season 2)	3 April 2017; 21 August 2017	13 July 2017; 21 December 2017	4 February 2019 – 16 August 2019		
(Turkey) Kızım	My Little Princess	7 January 2020	26 March 2020	1 August 2022 – 4 October 2022		
(Turkey) Kiralık Aşk	Love Is at Stake	1 August 2023	19 December 2023	2 May 2025 – 19 September 2025		
(Turkey) Kiraz Mevsimi	When Love Blooms	15 April 2024	2 August 2024	planned		
(Italy) (Spain) La Dama Velata	The Lady with the Veil	2 June 2015	25 June 2015	23 July 2017 – 27 August 2017		
(Croatia) Larin izbor	Lara's Choice (season 1)	28 May 2012	21 July 2013	17 August 2015 – 23 December 2015	3 June 2019 – 23 August 2019	
(Turkey) Leyla: Hayat… Aşk… Adalet...	Leyla	planned	planned			
(Spain) Lo Que Escondían Sus Ojos	Prohibited Love	29 August 2019	30 August 2019			
(Turkey) Meryem	Meryem	7 June 2021	12 November 2021	11 September 2023 – 14 November 2023		
(Turkey) Muhteşem Yüzyıl	Sultan (season 1–2); Sultan (season 3)	2 January 2012; 11 March 2013	14 September 2012; 14 November 2013	10 January 2015 – 5 December 2015	12 December 2015 – 16 July 2016	
(Turkey) Paramparça	Exchanged Lives (all seasons)	1 August 2016	22 May 2017	20 May 2019 – 4 February 2020		
(Romania) Regina	Regina: The Queen of Gipsy Hearts	31 August 2009	9 April 2010	6 January 2014 – 15 August 2014		
(Turkey) Sadakatsiz	Betrayed	26 August 2025	8 December 2025	planned		
(India) Saraswatichandra	Indian Bride (all seasons)	8 February 2016	22 December 2016	16 July 2018 – 15 February 2019		
(Turkey) Sefirin Kızı	The Ambassador's Daughter	27 February 2023	30 June 2023	4 September 2024 – 20 December 2024		
(Turkey) Sen Anlat Karadeniz	Saved Lives	27 June 2022	23 February 2023			
(Turkey) Sen Çal Kapımı	Love for Rent	3 January 2022	23 June 2022	6 January 2025 – 1 May 2025		
(Turkey) Senden Daha Güzel	More Beautiful Than You	3 July 2023	31 July 2023	1 April 2025 – 1 May 2025		
(Turkey) Sıla	Sila	5 August 2013	27 March 2014	4 January 2016 – 27 July 2016		
(Turkey) Tatlı İntikam	Sweet Revenge	3 September 2018	26 October 2018	29 March 2021 – 3 June 2021		
(Spain) Velvet	Velvet (season 1–3); Velvet (season 4)	4 July 2016; 14 May 2017	9 November 2016; 16 July 2017	29 October 2018 – 8 February 2019		
(United States) Watch Over Me	The Bodyguard	3 January 2012	30 March 2012			
(Turkey) Ya Çok Seversen	Teach Me to Love	1 January 2024	26 January 2024	planned		
(Turkey) Yabani	Untamed Heart	22 September 2025	January 2026	planned		
(Turkey) Zalim İstanbul	Two Faces of Istanbul	17 August 2021	13 December 2021	15 November 2023 – 23 February 2024		

== CME's regionally produced programs ==
=== Airing currently ===
- Rose Garden Medical Clinic (all seasons)

=== Coming soon ===
- Come Dine with Me Slovakia
- Private Matters (all movies)

=== Ended ===
- Between Friends
- Come Date with Me Slovakia
- Doctors
- Four Weddings Slovakia
- Girlfriends (all series)
- Hot Blood (all seasons)
- Hurricane
- Insuring Happiness (season 3–5)
- Our Street (season 3)
- Perfect Day
- Perfect World
- Talentmania
- Wife Swap Slovakia

== TV series ==
=== Airing currently ===
- Elementary
- Friends
- T@gged
- Light as a Feather
- Rizzoli & Isles
- The Middle

=== Coming soon ===
- 2 Broke Girls (all seasons)
- 90210 (all seasons)
- Dallas (all seasons)
- Hellcats
- Houdini & Doyle
- Outlander (season 1–3)
- Pretty Little Liars (all seasons)
- Shameless (season 1–6)
- The Secret Circle

=== Ended ===
- 'Til Death (all seasons)
- 3 lbs.
- 666 Park Avenue
- 7th Heaven (season 1–5)
- Alice Nevers (season 1–3)
- Ally McBeal (all seasons)
- Ask Harriet
- Beauty & the Beast (season 1)
- Better with You
- Close to Home (season 2)
- Cold Case (all seasons)
- Courting Alex
- Criminal Minds (season 3)
- Dharma & Greg (all seasons)
- Drop Dead Diva (season 1–5)
- Early Edition (all seasons)
- Eastwick
- Élodie Bradford (season 1–2)
- ER (season 14–15)
- Forever
- Frasier (all seasons)
- Gilmore Girls (all seasons)
- Gossip Girl (all seasons)
- H_{2}O: Just Add Water (season 1)
- Hart of Dixie (all seasons)
- Hawthorne (all seasons)
- House (all seasons)
- Charmed (season 1–6)
- Jesse (all seasons)
- Jo
- Joan of Arcadia (all seasons)
- LAX
- Lost Girl (all seasons)
- Love, Inc.
- Major Crimes (season 1–2)
- Made in Jersey
- Married... with Children (season 1–6)
- Melrose Place
- Men in Trees (all seasons)
- Mercy
- Miami Medical
- Mike & Molly (season 1–5)
- Missing (all seasons)
- Monk (all seasons)
- NCIS (season 5)
- Necessary Roughness (all seasons)
- Nurse Jackie (all seasons)
- Pasadena
- Privileged
- Pushing Daisies (all seasons)
- Roseanne (season 6–9)
- Royal Pains (season 1–6)
- Sabrina, the Teenage Witch (all seasons)
- Sea of Souls (all seasons)
- Seafarers (all seasons)
- Seinfeld (season 1–4)
- Sex and the City (all seasons)
- Step by Step (all seasons)
- Suburgatory (season 1–2)
- Suddenly Susan (all seasons)
- Sue Thomas: F.B.Eye (all seasons)
- Summerland (all seasons)
- Suspected
- The Captain (season 2)
- The Client List (all seasons)
- The Guardian (season 1–2)
- The Mentalist (all seasons)
- The Millers (all seasons)
- The Mysteries of Laura (all season)
- The Mob Doctor
- The Nanny (all seasons)
- The Prince and the Maiden (season 3)
- The O.C. (season 1–3)
- The Tudors (all seasons)
- The Vampire Diaries (season 3–5)
- The Whole Truth
- Undercovers
- Unforgettable (all seasons)
- Veterinarian Dr. Mertens (all seasons)
- Veronica Mars (all seasons)
- Veronica's Closet (all seasons)
- Without a Trace (season 1–4)
- Yes, Dear (season 1–2)

== Movie series and miniseries ==
- Angélique
- Anne of Green Gables
- Avignon Prophecy
- Columbo (all movies)
- Cruise to Happiness
- Daughter of Elisa: Return to Rivombrosa
- Desert of Fire
- Dream Hotel
- Elisa of Rivombrosa (all seasons)
- Fantaghirò
- Harlequin
- In The Valley of Wild Roses
- Laura: The Countdown Has Begun
- Love, Babies and the Great Heart
- McBride
- Mountain of Diamonds
- Mystery Woman
- Our Farm in Ireland
- Sissi Trilogy
- Sissi: The True Story of Her Love
- The Alpin Clinic
- The Dream Ship
- The Holiday Doctor
- The Seventh Scroll
- The Thorn Birds
- The Thorn Birds: The Missing Years
- Zodiak: The Horoscope Killer

== TV shows ==
=== Ended ===
- 16 and Pregnant (season 1–5)
- Baby It's You/A Baby's World
- Extreme Christmas Trees
- Extreme Makeover: Weight Loss Edition (all seasons)
- Fly Girls
- It's Me or the Dog (season 1–3)
- Judge Hatchett (all seasons)
- Planet Cake
- So You Think You Can Dance (season 8)
- Supernanny
- Teen Mom (all seasons)
- The Dr. Oz Show (season 1–2)
- The Naked Chef (all seasons)
- The Nate Berkus Show (season 1)
- The Voice USA (season 3)
- Victoria's Secret Fashion Show (2010, 2011)
- Wedding Belles
- What Not To Wear UK (all seasons)
