= Yalçın Tura =

Turkish composer, music theorist, musicologist, and academic

- Born: İsmail Yalçın Kaya; 17 April 1934 (age 91); Istanbul, Turkey
- Education: Galatasaray High School; Istanbul University
- Occupations: Composer, musicologist, music theorist, academic
- Years active: 20th–21st century
- Known for: Contributions to Turkish music theory and film music
- Notable work: Scholarly writings on Turkish makam; film scores

Yalçın Tura (born 17 April 1934) is a Turkish composer, music theorist, musicologist, and academic. He is known for his contributions to contemporary Turkish classical music, film music, and theoretical studies on makam and Turkish music systems. Tura has also served in various academic and cultural institutions in Turkey and has written extensively on music theory. He composed the music of Turkish cinema classics such as Aşk-ı Memnû, Keşanlı Ali Destanı, Yılanların Öcü, Toprak Ana, Taşbebek, and Umutsuzlar. He is a recipient of Presidential Culture and Arts Grand Awards (2025).

== Early life and education ==
Yalçın Tura was born as İsmail Yalçın Kaya on 17 April 1934 in Istanbul, Turkey. He went to a primary school in 1941 in Beyazıt, Istanbul and graduated from Galatasaray High School in 1954 and from the Philosophy Department of Istanbul University in 1960.

He learned to play the violin and piano from a young age. During his high school years, he took violin classes from Seyfettin Asal and music theory and harmony classes from Demirhan Altuğ and Cemal Reşit Rey.

Between 1955 and 1976, he composed film and stage music as an independent composer.

== Awards ==
- 1970 – 1971: 13 awards from the TRT Music Awards
- 1980: Sacem award for encouraging young symphony composers.
- 1983: Golden Orange Award for the best soundtrack for the movie Bir Yudum Sevgi.
- 1984: Turkish National Culture Foundation television gift for the music of the series Küçük Ağa.
- 1997: Golden Orange Award for the best soundtrack with the movie Sen de Gitme.
- 2005: Lifetime honorary award of the Cinema Writers Association.
- 2009: Golden Orange Film Festival – Lifetime Honor Award
- 2009: International Istanbul Music Festival honorary award.
- 2015: Sevda-Cenap And Music Foundation Honorary Award Gold Medal.
- 2025: The Presidential Culture and Arts Grand Awards from the Turkish president Recep Tayyip Erdoğan.

== Books ==
- Türk Musıkisi ve Armoni [Turkish Music and Harmony] (in Turkish). İz Publishing. January 2019. ISBN 978-6053264002.
- Türk Mûsıkîsinin Mes'eleleri [Issues of Turkish Music] (in Turkish). İz Publishing. 2017. ISBN 978-605-326-216-9.
- Kantemiroğlu: Musikiyi Harflerle Tespit ve İcra İlminin Kitabı [Kantemiroğlu: The Book of the Science of Identifying Music with Letters and Execution] (in Turkish). Yapı Kredi Yayınları. 2000. ISBN 978-9750801679.
