= GPoT Center =

Research unit at the Istanbul Kültür University in Turkey

GPoT Center (Turkish: Küresel Siyasal Eğilimler Merkezi) officially the Global Political Trends Center is a research unit, which was established by Mensur Akgun and Sylvia Tiryaki at the Istanbul Kültür University in Turkey in 2009. The mission of the center is to conduct research, projects, to produce innovative publications analyzing the latest issues in the international relations, to formulate viable political recommendations and to boost the dialogue between civil society, academia and media. The center also works to "contribute to stability, democratization and peace through organizing multi-track diplomacy meetings". It regularly brings together opinion leaders, scholars, experts and government officials, not only from Turkey, but also from other countries.

Region-specific programs cover Armenia, Cyprus, Europe, Israel, the Middle East and North Africa. Since 2013, GPoT Center has had a special consultative status with the United Nations Economic and Social Council.

== Activities ==
GPoT Center, as one of the leading Turkish think tanks, runs projects in various areas and has organized numerous conferences, workshops and round-table meetings focused on: the EU - Turkey relations, the Cyprus question, the Turkey - Armenia relations, Turkish - Arab dialogue, NATO, second track diplomacy between Syria and Israel, Arab-Israeli conflict and other issues related to the international agenda in general and the agenda of Turkish foreign policy in particular.

The projects implemented by GPoT Center often involve participation of high-level politicians and opinion makers, however the center is also active in organization of second-track diplomacy meetings aiming at effective conflict solution. For the purposes of second-track diplomacy, GPoT Center brings together representatives of conflicting parties, i.e. civil society activists, opinion leaders, as well as academics to discuss issues pertaining to solution of the relevant problem. The meetings are usually conducted in friendly atmosphere and under Chatham House Rules.

== Publications ==
The Center publishes various types of publications available in the electronic as well as printed form. It has published a number of policy briefs analyzing issues in international relations and shorter essays, i.e. GPoT Briefs focusing on one topic from the current global issues. GPoT Center published its first two books on Cyprus issue in the summer 2009 and has since then published other books on developments in Cyprus, Israeli-Turkish relations, as well as democratization of the Middle East.

== Partners and Networks ==
The Center cooperates with institutions from Sweden - SIIA, Lebanon - CAUS, Qatar - ADF, United Kingdom - LSE, Czech Republic - EUROPEUM, Slovak Republic - SFPA, Armenia - EPF, YPC and Internews, Egypt - Ibn-Khaldun Center, and France - ENS. GPoT Center is also part of larger research and academic networks such as the United Nations's Alliance of Civilizations, International Research and Security Network, United Nations' Committee on the Exercise of the Inalienable Rights of the Palestinian People and Anna Lindh Euro-Mediterranean Foundation for the Dialogue Between Cultures.
