= Kırık Hayatlar =

1965 Turkish film

- Directed by: Halit Refiğ
- Starring: Belgin Doruk; Cüneyt Arkın; Nebahat Çehre
- Release date: 1965
- Country: Turkey
- Language: Turkish

Kırık Hayatlar (Broken Lives) is a 1965 Turkish drama film, directed by Halit Refiğ and starring Belgin Doruk, Cüneyt Arkın, and Nebahat Çehre. It is based on the novel with the same name from Halid Ziya Uşaklıgil. Another version TV series was released in 2021, starring Meltem Akçöl, Murat Onuk and Burcu Almeman.

In Orhan Pamuk's novel The Museum of Innocence the main character finances a movie based on Broken Lives, which is described as "a tale of love and family ties in the Ottoman mansions of the Westernized bourgeoisie and the imperial elite".
