= Bade İşcil =

Turkish actress (born 1983)

- Born: 8 August 1983 (age 41); Istanbul, Turkey
- Occupation: Actress
- Years active: 2007–present
- Spouse: Malkoç Sualp (m. 2013; div. 2016)
- Children: 1

Bade İşcil (born 8 August 1983) is a Turkish actress. She played Banu Sinaner in Kuzey Güney, Şebnem Sertuna in Ezel, and Pelin in the action-romance-thriller series Ufak Tefek Cinayetler.

== Life and career ==
Bade İşcil was born on 8 August 1983 in Istanbul. One side of her family are Balkan Turks who immigrated from Bulgaria and the other side are Tatars who immigrated from Romania. She's a graduate of Yeditepe University's Department of Fashion and Design. She had her acting debut in 2007, with a role in Cine5's Metropol Cafe. From 2009 to 2011, she portrayed the character of "Şebnem Sertuna" on Ezel. She was then cast in the TV series Kuzey Güney. On 31 May 2013, İşcil married businessman Malkoç Sualp whom she had met in March and later gave birth to their son Azur. The couple later got divorced.

== Filmography ==
Television
Year	Title	Role	Notes
2006	Gülpare		
2007	Metropol Cafe	Şebnem	
2009–2011	Ezel	Şebnem Sertuna	Supporting role
2011–2013	Kuzey Güney	Banu Sinaner	Supporting role
2017–2018	Ufak Tefek Cinayetler	Pelin Kaner	Leading role

Internet
Year	Title	Role	Notes
2020–2021	Love 101	Işık (adult)	Supporting role
2022	Aslında Özgürsün	Belgin	Leading role
2024	Thank You, Next	Tuba Tepelioğlu	Supporting role

Cinema
Year	Title	Role	Notes
2017	Eski Sevgili	Feride	Leading role

== Awards ==
Year	Award	Category	Work
2012	Ayaklı Newspaper TV Stars	Best Supporting Drama Actress	Kuzey Güney
2012	Galatasaray University	Best Actress	Kuzey Güney
