= Americans at the Black Sea =

2007 Turkish comedy film

- Theatrical poster
- Directed by: Kartal Tibet
- Written by: Kubilay Tunçer
- Produced by: Selay Tozkoparan
- Starring: Metin Akpınar; Peker Açıkalın; Kadir Çöpdemir; Kıvanç Tatlıtuğ; Melis Birkan
- Production company: Energy Medya
- Distributed by: Kenda Film
- Release date: 26 January 2007
- Running time: 100 minutes
- Country: Turkey
- Language: Turkish

Americans at the Black Sea (Turkish: Amerikalılar Karadeniz'de 2) is a 2007 Turkish comedy film, directed by Kartal Tibet, about a U.S. military recovery operation on Turkey's Black Sea coast. The film, which went on nationwide general release across Turkey on 26 January 2007.

== Plot ==
A rocket the United States has located on the Black Sea's seabed as a precaution against a potential threat from Tehran launches accidentally. Officers, quickly realizing the incident, alter the coordinates of the rocket and manage to land it—without exploding—on Turkey's Black Sea coast. All that's left is to retrieve the rocket from the village before anybody notices.

== See also ==
- Stereotypes of Americans
