= Sylvia Tiryaki =

Slovak lawyer

Sylvia Tiryaki (born 1973) is a Slovak academic, analyst, and political commentator, as well as a lawyer specializing in human rights and international law. She works as an associate professor and teaches at the Bratislava International School of Liberal Arts (BISLA). She also serves as the Chair of the Helsinki Committee for Human Rights in Slovakia.

== Education ==
Tiryaki studied law at the Faculty of Law of Comenius University in Bratislava (Master’s degree in 1996, JUDr. in 2000), and in 2013 she earned a PhD in European Studies and Politics from the Faculty of Social and Economic Sciences at Comenius University.

== Career ==
Between 2003 and 2008, Tiryaki worked as a researcher and project assistant at the Turkish Economic and Social Studies Foundation (TESEV) in Istanbul. During this time, she contributed to the legal analysis of the Annan Plan for the reunification of Cyprus, which was voted on by Greek and Turkish Cypriots in a 2004 referendum. She was also a regular contributor to the Turkish daily Turkish Daily News (Hürriyet Daily News), where she published commentary on international politics and security.

Tiryaki served as Vice Chair of the Department of International Relations at Istanbul Kültür University. In 2009, she co-founded the GPoT Center (Center for Global Political Trends) at Istanbul Kültür University, where she held the position of Executive Director. Her work focused on research into international conflicts, regional stability, and informal diplomatic initiatives. At the same time, she lectured on international law, human rights, the history of political thought, and related subjects at the Faculty of Economics and Administrative Sciences of Istanbul Kültür University (2003–2018).

In 2021, she became Chair of the Helsinki Committee for Human Rights in Slovakia, where she focuses on promoting the protection of human rights and democratic principles, particularly through educational activities. She has also served as an advisor to the Minister of Foreign Affairs of the Slovak Republic on issues related to the Middle East and Turkey. She works as an external expert collaborator with the international organization GLOBSEC. focusing on the Middle East and global security.

In the Slovak academic sphere, Tiryaki worked in 2022 at the Institute of International and European Law at Pan-European University. She serves as an associate professor at BISLA, where she teaches courses focused on international relations, international law, human rights, the European Union, and the Middle East. At the beginning of 2023, she was officially appointed by the Minister of Justice as a member of the Government Council of the Slovak Republic for Human Rights, National Minorities, and Gender Equality. Since 2024, she has also served as a member of the board of the Democracy and Human Rights Education in Europe Network (DARE).

Tiryaki is a member of several professional and academic organizations, including the Slovak Bar Association (SAK), the International Law Association (ILA), the Royal United Services Institute (RUSI), the British Institute at Ankara (BIAA), the Middle East Studies Association (MESA), the International Political Science Association (IPSA), the American Political Science Association (APSA), and the International Relations Council of Turkey (UİK-IRCT).

== Publications ==
- Finding Common Grounds - Rediscovering the Common Narrative of Turkey and Europe. Bratislava: RC SFPA, 2009. (Edited book)
- A Promise to Keep: Time to end the international isolation of the Turkish Cypriots. Istanbul: TESEV Publications, June 2008. (Edited book)
- EU Accession Prospects for Turkey and Ukraine: Debates in New Member States. Warsaw: Institute of Public Affairs, 2006. (Edited book)
- Quo Vadis Cyprus?. Istanbul: TESEV Publications, April 2005. (Edited book)
- Freedom Flotila: Before and Aftermath in Middle East Observer. Anhens: Security and Defence Analysis Institute, Vol. 1, issue 3, August 2010.
- Ending the Isolation of Turkish Cypriots in Insight Turkey. Istanbul: SETA Foundation, Vol. 12, No. 1/2010, February 2010.
- European Identity 2006 in International Issues & Slovak Foreign Policy Affairs. Bratislava: RC SFPA, Vol. 1, 2006.
- The Annan Plan: A Missed Opportunity. World Security Network, 14 May 2004.
