= Aşk-ı Memnu (1975 TV series) =

- Created by: Halit Refiğ
- Starring: Müjde Ar; Salih Güney; Neriman Köksal; Şükran Güngör; Çolpan İlhan; Murat Erton; Itır Esen; Suna Keskin; Ersin Pertan
- Theme music composer: Yalçın Tura
- No. of seasons: 1
- No. of episodes: 6

Production
- Producer: Halit Refiğ
- Running time: 33 minutes

Original release
- Network: TRT 1
- Release: April 19 – May 24, 1975

Related
- Aşk-ı Memnu (2008–2010)

Aşk-ı Memnu is the second television series produced in Turkey and the first television miniseries adapted from the eponymous novel by Halid Ziya Uşaklıgil. The first part of the six-part series was released on TRT 1 channel on 19 April 1975.

== Cast ==
=== Main characters ===
- Müjde Ar as Bihter Ziyagil
- Salih Güney as Behlül Haznedar
- Neriman Köksal as Firdevs
- Şükran Güngör as Adnan
- Çolpan İlhan as Mademoiselle de Courton
- Murat Erton as Bülent
- Itır Esen as Nihal
- Suna Keskin as Peyker
- Ersin Pertan as Nihat
- İhsan Küçüktepe as Beşir

== Episodes ==
1. Melih Bey Takımndan Oluyoruz!
2. Nihal Hanım'ın Çarşafı
3. Çılgınlık Bu Yaptığımız!
4. Gelin Olmak mı? Asla!
5. Behlül'den Sakın!
6. Firdevs Hanım'ın Kızı
