= Gülen Gözler =

- Directed by: Ertem Eğilmez
- Written by: Sadık Şendil; Ahmet Üstel
- Starring: Münir Özkul; Adile Naşit; Müjde Ar; Itır Esen; Şener Şen; Ayşen Gruda; Halit Akçatepe
- Cinematography: Hüseyin Özşahin
- Music by: Melih Kibar
- Release date: 1 December 1977
- Country: Turkey
- Language: Turkish

Gülen Gözler ("Laughing Eyes") is a 1977 Turkish comedy film directed by Ertem Eğilmez.

== Plot ==
Yaşar and his wife Nezaket have kept on producing children in the hope of finally getting a male child. But they end up with only daughters instead (who they give masculine names). Now they are stuck with the task of arranging suitable rich husbands for them.

== Cast ==
- Münir Özkul as Yaşar
- Adile Naşit as Nezaket
- Müjde Ar as İsmet
- Itır Esen as Nedret
- Şener Şen as Vecihi
- Ayşen Gruda as Fikret
- Halit Akçatepe as Dursun
- Mahmut Hekimoğlu as Temel
- Şevket Altuğ as Laz Şevket
- Lale Ilgaz as Hasret
- Nejat Gürçen as Yunus
- Sevda Aktolga as Hikmet
- Ahmet Sezerel as Orhan
- Tuncay Akça as Tuncay
- İhsan Yüce as Hasan
