= Tuba Büyüküstün =

Turkish actress and model (born 1982)

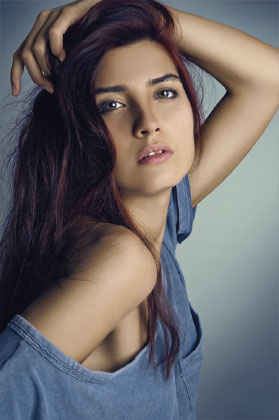
- Büyüküstün in 2012
- Born: 5 July 1982 (age 44); Istanbul, Turkey
- Education: Mimar Sinan University
- Occupation: Actress
- Years active: 2003–present
- Spouse: Onur Saylak (m. 2011; div. 2017)
- Children: 2
- Website: tubabuyukustun.com.tr

Hatice Tuba Büyüküstün (Turkish pronunciation: [tuːˈbaː byjyˈcystyn]; born 5 July 1982) is a Turkish actress and model. She is the recipient of several awards and one of Turkey's most popular and highest paid actresses.

== Personal life ==
Büyüküstün is Muslim. Büyüküstün's parents are from Erzurum.. The maternal side of her family are immigrants from Crimea. Her paternal side are Muslim immigrants from Crete, Greece. She studied costume & design at Mimar Sinan University, and graduated in 2004. On 28 July 2011, she married the Turkish actor Onur Saylak in Paris, France. In January 2012, she gave birth to twin girls Maya and Toprak. The couple split on 5 June 2017.

== Career ==
=== TV series ===
Following appearances in television commercials, Büyüküstün made her television series debut in 2003 in the last four episodes of Sultan Makamı, directed by Aydın Bulut and broadcast on Channel D. Her next period series role was Zarife on Çemberimde Gül Oya, directed by Çağan Irmak, broadcast on Channel D in 2004. In 2005, she starred in the series Ihlamurlar Altında, directed by Aydın Bulut. Making her a star throughout all the Middle East. Her next role was the title character in the 2007–2009 television drama Asi, alongside Murat Yıldırım and Çetin Tekindor, directed by Cevdet Mercan.

In 2010, she acted with Cansel Elçin in the series Gönülçelen. At the end of 2012, she starred alongside İlker Aksum in the dramatic series 20 Dakika (20 Minutes), a performance that earned her a nomination for the 42nd International Emmy Award for Best Actress.

Büyüküstün, who was appointed as a goodwill ambassador of UNICEF Turkey in 2014, starred alongside Engin Akyürek in the 2014–15 series Kara Para Aşk (Black Money Love). Her next series, which according to schedules began broadcast on 10 November 2016, was titled Cesur ve Güzel (Brave and Beautiful). She starred as the female lead, opposite Kıvanç Tatlıtuğ. In 2021 Mavi in Sefirin Kizi.

=== Web series career ===
In 2020, she portrayed Mara Branković in the Netflix original docudrama Rise of Empires: Ottoman. Büyüküstün starred in the Netflix series "Another Self" in 2022.

=== Film career ===
In 2004, she portrayed the title character in the television movie Gülizar. She played Aysun in the hit film Babam ve Oğlum, directed by Çağan Irmak. Büyüküstün played a teacher in the 2006 movie Sınav (The Exam), where she had the opportunity to act alongside Jean-Claude Van Damme.

In 2010, her first leading role in cinema was Esma in Yüreğine Sor by Yusuf Kurçenli.

== Filmography ==
Films
Year	Title	Role
2004	Gülizar	Gülizar
2005	Babam ve Oğlum	Aysun
2006	Aşk Yolu	Deniz
2006	Sınav	Zeynep Erez
2010	Yüreğine Sor	Esma
2015	Orman	Zeynep
2015	Rüzgarın Hatıraları	Zepur
2015	Dar Elbise	Helin
2016	İstanbul Kırmızısı	Neval
2017	Daha	Ahra
2025	Dehşet Bey	Abide
2026	Sultana	Meral
2026	Soy	

Telefilms
Year	Title	Role
2004	Gülizar	Gülizar
2005	Aşk Yolu	Deniz

TV series
Year	Title	Role
2003	Sultan Makamı	Nesrin
2004	Çemberimde Gül Oya	Zarife
2005–2007	Ihlamurlar Altında	Filiz Tekiner
2007–2009	Asi	Asiye "Asi" Kozcuoğlu
2009	Beni w Benak	Herself (guest appearance)
2010–2011	Gönülçelen	Hasret
2013	20 Dakika	Melek Halaskar
2014–2015	Kara Para Aşk	Elif Denizer
2016–2017	Cesur ve Güzel	Sühan Korludağ
2020	Rise of Empires: Ottoman	Mara Branković
2020	Menajerimi Ara	Herself
2021	Sefirin Kızı	Mavi Çinar/Efeoglu
2022	Zeytin Ağacı	Ada
2024	Yarin Yokmuş Gibi	Manolya

Brand endorsement
Year	Brand	Notes
2000	Colin's	TV advertisement (Europe–Turkey)
2001	Kremini	TV advertisement (Turkey)
2002	Molped	TV advertisement (Turkey)
2007–2013	Pantene	TV advertisement (Turkey)
2008	Lamees and Mohannad perfume	TV advertisement (Middle East) (with Kıvanç Tatlıtuğ)
2010	Maximum Card	TV advertisement (Turkey)
2010–2014	Pantene	TV advertisement (Middle East)
2012–2013	Pantene	TV advertisement (Azerbaijan)
2014–2015	Molfix	TV advertisement (Middle East)
2021	Eti Browni Intense	Advertisement (Turkey)
2021	MegaFon	TV advertisement (Russia)

== Discography ==
- "Sayenizde" (2019) - cover version of Ercan Saatçi's 1995 song "Sayenizde"

== Awards ==
Year	Award	Category	Work	Result
2005	Serbia and Montenegro International TV Festival Bar	Best Actress	Gülizar	Won
2007	Istanbul University IT Awards	Best Actress	Ihlamurlar Altında	Won
2008	Istanbul University Computer Club Awards	Best Actress	Asi	Won
2010	Marmara University Math Club Success Awards	Most Successful Actress	Yüreğine Sor	Won
2010	Radio–Television Journalists Association Media Oscars	Best Actress of the Year	Gönülçelen	Won
2010	Journal of Politics Best of the Year Awards	Television Actress of the Year	Gönülçelen	Won
2010	atvdiziler.com Prestige Awards	Best Actress	Gönülçelen	Won
2010	TelevizyonDizisi.com Awards	Best Actress	Gönülçelen	Won
2010	DiziFilm.com Oscars	Best Drama Actress	Gönülçelen	Won
2010	AyakliGazete.com Television Stars of the Year	Best Actress	Gönülçelen	Won
2011	TelevizyonDizisi.com Awards	Best Actress	Gönülçelen	Won
2011	Elle Style Awards Turkey	Elle Style Actress		Won
2013	TUROB Successful Turkish Series	Honorary Award	Ihlamurlar Altında	Won
2013	KARVAK (Black Sea Foundation) Best of The Year	Best Actress of the Year	20 Dakika	Won
2013	TelevizyonDizisi.com Awards	Best Actress	20 Dakika	Won
2014	42nd International Emmy Awards	Best Actress	20 Dakika	Nominated
2014	Electrical Electronics and Service Exporters Association Cultural Service Awards	Stars of the Export	Kara Para Aşk	Won
2014	TelevizyonDizisi.com Awards	Best Actress	Kara Para Aşk	Won
2015	Radio–Television Journalists Association Media Oscars	Best Actress of the Year	Kara Para Aşk	Won
2015	Istanbul Technical University Industrial Engineering Club (EMÖS) Success Awards	Most Successful Actress	Kara Para Aşk	Won
2015	TelevizyonDizisi.com Awards	Best Actress	Kara Para Aşk	Won
2015	Uludağ University Marconi Awards	Best Actress of the Year	Kara Para Aşk	Won
2015	14th International Giuseppe Sciacca Awards	Best Actress	Kara Para Aşk	Won
2015	Golden Butterfly Awards	Best Actress	Kara Para Aşk	Nominated
2015	Golden Butterfly Awards	Best Couple	Kara Para Aşk	Nominated
2015	4th Crystal Mouse Awards	Best Actress	Kara Para Aşk	Won
2015	Süleyman Şah University Model United Nation Universities (MUNunivs) Program	Peace Ambassador Award		Won
2016	2nd Turkey Youth Awards	Best Actress	Kara Para Aşk	Won
2016	Film Fest International	Best Leading Actress in a Short Film	The Jungle	Nominated
2017	TelevisionDisisi.com Best Awards	Best Couple (Cesur & Suhan)	Brave and Beautiful	Won
2017	Sayidaty magazine	Most Successful Turkish Actress	Brave and Beautiful	Won
2017	Distinctive International Arab Festivals Awards	Best Couple (Cesur & Suhan)	Brave and Beautiful	Won
2017	Young Turkish Turkey Award	Best Cinema Actress	Rosso Istanbul	Won
