= Aşk-ı Memnu (2008 TV series) =

2008 Turkish television series

- Genre: Romance; Betrayal
- Based on: Aşk-ı Memnu by Halit Ziya Uşaklıgil
- Written by: Ece Yörenç; Melek Gençoğlu
- Directed by: Hilal Saral
- Starring: Beren Saat; Kıvanç Tatlıtuğ; Selçuk Yöntem; Nebahat Çehre; Hazal Kaya; Zerrin Tekindor; Baran Akbulut
- Composer: Toygar Işıklı
- Country of origin: Turkey
- Original language: Turkish
- No. of seasons: 2
- No. of episodes: 79

Production
- Producer: Kerem Çatay
- Cinematography: Hüseyin Tunç
- Running time: 90 minutes
- Production company: Ay Yapım

Original release
- Network: Kanal D
- Release: 4 September 2008 – 24 June 2010

Related
- Pasión prohibida Dil Sambhal Jaa Zara

Aşk-ı Memnu (transl. 'The Forbidden Love' Turkish pronunciation: [ˈaʃkɯ memˈnu:]) is a Turkish romantic drama television series aired on Kanal D from 2008 to 2010. A modern adaptation of Halit Ziya Uşaklıgil's 1899 novel of the same name, Aşk-ı Memnu follows the love triangle story of Adnan Ziyagil (Selçuk Yöntem), a wealthy businessman in Istanbul’s high society, his younger lover Bihter Yöreoğlu (Beren Saat), and his nephew, Behlül Haznedar (Kıvanç Tatlıtuğ), who falls in love with Bihter.

== Synopsis ==
Adnan Ziyagil, a rich Istanbul businessman lives an idyllic life in his mansion on the shore of Istanbul's Bosporus strait with his two children: teenage daughter Nihal and eleven-year-old son Bülent, his orphaned younger relative Behlül, and various house staff. Behlül, son of Adnan's cousin, moved in after his parents died in a car accident when he was young. He is in his 20s and a charming playboy as the series starts. Deniz de Courton is the children's tutor and has been living in the household long before the death of Adnan's wife. Deniz is of both Turkish and French heritage and is known to the entire household as "Mademoiselle". She was "entrusted" with the children by Adnan's deceased wife on her deathbed.

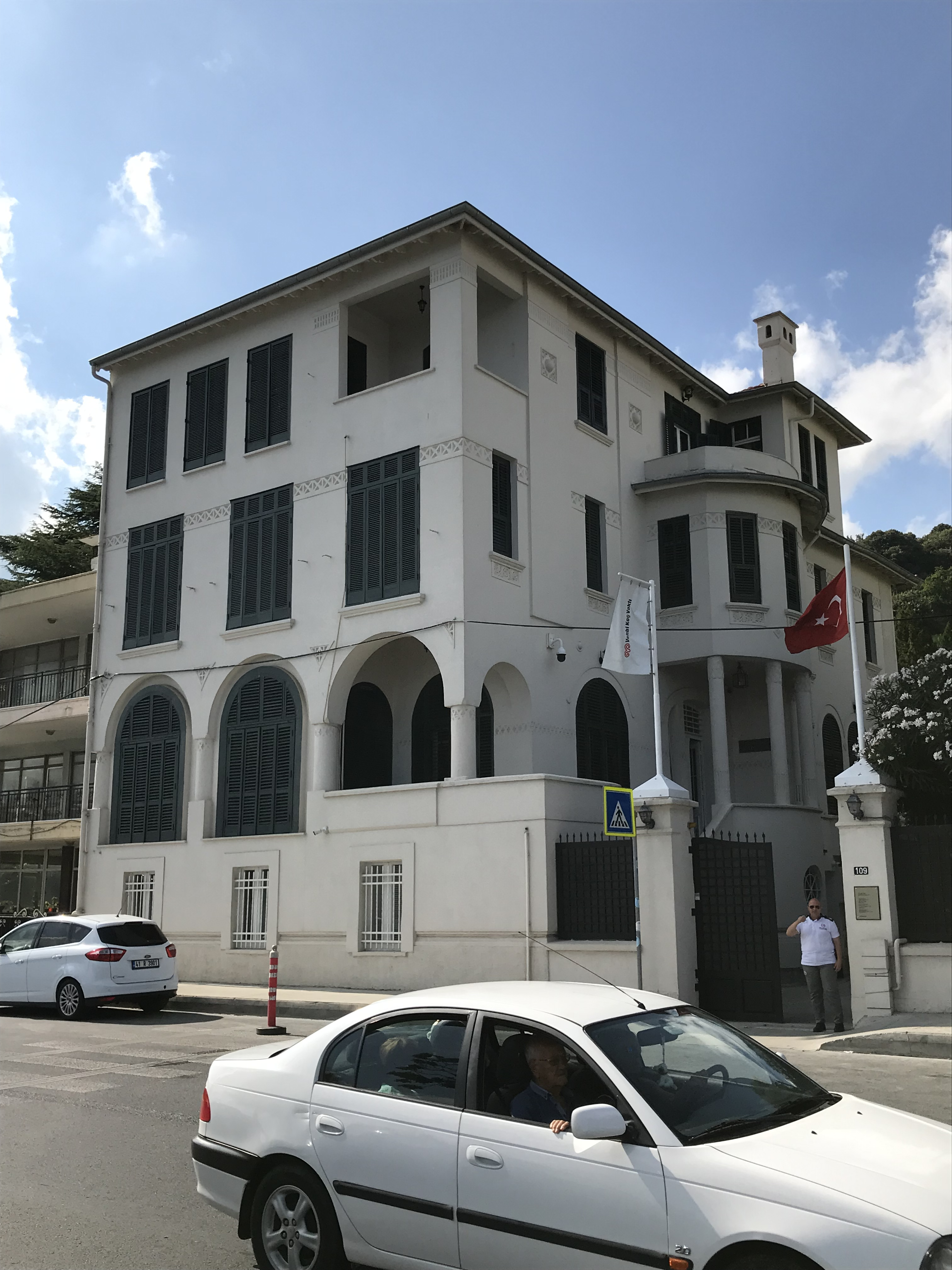
The mansion, where Vehbi Koç resided with his family during the summer months, and which has been turned into a museum as the "Vehbi Koç Büyükdere House", is the main shooting location of the series, Sarıyer, Istanbul

A wealthy widower, Adnan attracts the attention of Firdevs Yöreoğlu, who has two daughters and has recently lost her husband. Peyker Yöreoğlu (Firdevs's eldest daughter) dated Behlül but marries Nihat Önal, son of another wealthy Istanbul family as the story begins. At their wedding, Adnan and Bihter Yöreoğlu (Firdevs's younger daughter) bond over the loss of their loved ones. Adnan falls in love with the much younger and beautiful Bihter. He proposes to her and she agrees to marry him even though she knows that her mother fancies Adnan. There is no love lost between mother and daughter as Bihter blames her mother for her father's death after she cheated on him with another man. Firdevs is also not a favorite of Nihat's father, the rich but cunning businessman Hilmi Önal. Hilmi dislikes Firdevs because she is greedy, cunning, and self-centered; he vows to make her life a living hell. Firdevs – along with her maid, Katya – moves in with the Ziyagils after she suffers a serious car accident.

The marriage of Bihter and Adnan begins well as Bihter tries to endear herself to Adnan's children. Adnan is devoted to Bihter but their age difference soon shows in their widely different reactions to events. Everyone knows Behlül as a playboy, more interested in girls than in his university studies. Bihter has held a grudge against him since he left her sister Peyker. Living together in the Ziyagil mansion, Behlül falls head over heels in love with Bihter. He tries to stay away and has feelings of guilt toward his uncle, but it proves a losing battle as he becomes more and more captivated by Bihter. She initially rejects him, but later falls for him. Their "forbidden love" (Aşk i Memnu in Turkish) becomes the centerpiece of the story which ends tragically. The series is an in-depth look at the damage their illicit affair does to them and the entire Ziyagil household.

== Characters ==
Role	Actor	Episodes	Character
Bihter Yöreoğlu/Ziyagil	Beren Saat	1-79	The lead protagonist Bihter is a beautiful young woman who blames her mother, Firdevs for the death of her father. While her mother was planning to marry Adnan Ziyagil, a rich widower, Adnan proposes to Bihter instead of her mother. Bihter agrees, but it is clear that for her Adnan is more of a father figure, replacing the father she has lost. Bihter attempts to endear herself to Adnan's two children. She begins an affair with Behlül, Adnan's "nephew" who lives in the mansion and falls in love with him.
Behlül Haznedar	Kıvanç Tatlıtuğ	1-79	The orphaned son of Adnan's cousin who lost both his parents in a car accident when he was a young child. He has been raised by Adnan, whom he calls "uncle". He is known as a womanizer and has many girls in his life, but he gradually falls madly in love with Bihter when she starts living with the family. A deeply feeling young man but he is not brave enough to defend their forbidden love due to guilt for his uncle who raised him as his own
Adnan Ziyagil	Selçuk Yöntem	1-79	A rich Istanbul businessman, head of a powerful holding, Adnan is a widower who falls in love with and marries the much younger Bihter. He has two children, Nihal and Bülent. He has raised the orphaned Behlül as his own son.
Firdevs Yöreoğlu	Nebahat Çehre	1-79	Bihter's and Peyker's mother, a greedy woman obsessed with money, status, and power. Her husband died of a heart attack when he discovered that she was having an affair. She is overbearing and manipulative and meddles in both her daughters (Bihter and Peyker)'s lives. She becomes aware of but wants to prevent the love between Bihter and Behlül.
Nihal Ziyagil	Hazal Kaya	1-79	The parallel lead protagonist Nihal is Adnan's innocent and naive daughter. Though she and Behlül have been raised as siblings, she has romantic feelings for and falls blindly in love with him. Behlül becomes engaged to her as one of his many attempts to cover up (or make up to his uncle for) his illicit affair with Bihter.
Ms. Deniz De Courton	Zerrin Tekindor	1-79	Nihal's and Bülent's tutor, she is well educated and cares for both the children who have been entrusted to her by their dying mother. She is secretly in love with Adnan but conceals her feelings as Adnan marries Bihter.
Bülent Ziyagil	Batuhan Karacakaya	1-79	Adnan's son and Nihal's younger brother. He is eleven years old when the series begins. A fun-loving kid who loves Behlül and looks up to him.
Peyker Yöreoğlu Önal	Nur Fettahoğlu	1-79	Bihter's older sister, Firdevs's daughter, Nihat's wife, Doruk and Cem's mother, and Behlül's ex-girlfriend.
Nihat Önal	İlker Kızmaz	1-79	Peyker's husband, Hilmi Önal's and Aynur's son, Adnan's much younger brother-in-law and business partner.
Hilmi Önal	Recep Aktuğ	1-38, 40-66, 68-72, 74-79	Nihat's father. A cruel and manipulative man who treats his wife and son as accessories. Hilmi initially disowns Nihat because he married Firdevs's daughter against his wishes. Nihat then goes to work for Adnan Ziyagil's family.
Aynur Önal	Zerrin Nişancı	1-38, 40-43, 45-78	Nihat's mother, Peyker's mother-in-law. A soft-spoken and kind lady who loves Peyker and Nihat very much.
Beşir Elçi	Baran Akbulut	1-79	Driver at Adnan's house. He was orphaned at the age of six and brought by Adnan to live in his house. He was raised along with Nihal and has fallen in love with her. He would go to any length to keep Nihal happy. He finds out about the Bihter-Behlül affair. In the end he dies of lung cancer.
Elif Bender	Eda Özerkan	1-38, 42-51	Behlül's most steady girlfriend. Behlül proposes to her in his attempts to stay away from Bihter, but feels no real love for her. They have a long engagement but break-up as Behlül and Bihter get deeper into their affair. Eventually she moves to Paris for her modeling career.
Süleyman	Rana Cabbar	1-79	Cook and head of the household staff for the Ziyagil family. He is married to Şayeste and has a daughter, Cemile. All three of them have lived in the mansion for years and are considered as "family" though there are clear upstairs and Cemile, downstairs conflicts between masters and servants.
Şayeste	Fatma Karanfil	1-79	Süleyman's wife and Cemile's mom.
Cemile	Pelin Ermiş	1-79	Süleyman and Şayeste's daughter. She loves Beşir.
Nesrin	Evren Duyal	1-79	The maid of the house. Gets engaged to Captain Rıza.
Katya	Ufuk Kaplan	1-79	Mrs. Firdevs's maid from Ukraine who had a crush on Saif.
Pelin	Hayal Köseoğlu	6-7, 13, 22, 24, 30, 34, 37-38, 58-59, 66, 71-72, 76-79	Nihal's friend. While she has a crush on Behlül, Bülent has a crush on her.
Saif	Uğur Tekin	1-79	When Beşir was sick, Saif came to the Ziyagil house as a driver. But actually, he was sent by Hilmi to spy on the family.
Arsen Ziyagil	Gülsen Tuncer	29-35, 37, 40-79	Adnan's older sister. Motherly presence for his children but lives in a country house outside of Istanbul. Often a "voice of reason" for Adnan and the rest of the family.

== Series overview ==
Season	Number of episodes	Episodes	Start of the Season	Season Finale	Viewers in Turkey (Millions)	Day and Time of Broadcasting	TV Season	TV Channel
Season 1	38	1–38	4 September 2008	18 June 2009	9.6~16.14	Thursday 20:00	2008–2009	Kanal D
Season 2	41	39–79 (Final)	3 September 2009	24 June 2010	15.1~27.1	Thursday 20:15	2009–2010	Kanal D

== Television ratings ==
The series grew popularity over the course of its two season run. The pilot episode garnered 9.6 million viewers on its initial release in Turkey, with the amount rising until the first-season finale, which 16.14 million viewers have watched. The second season premiered with 15.1 million viewers with the number fluctuating between 15 and 27 million viewers throughout the season. The series' finale, 41st episode of the season and the 79th episode overall, was watched by record-breaking 27.1 million viewers, making it the highest-watched episode of any TV show of all time in Turkey, with almost 40% of the population watching it.

== Other adaptations ==
The series follows a 1975 adaptation of the novel starring Salih Güney as Behlül, Müjde Ar as Bihter and Itır Esen as Nihal, taking place in the original late 19th-century setting. First Turkish TV series was Aşk-ı Memnu, which was produced in 1975. A Spanish-language American remake titled Pasión prohibida began airing in 2013. Later, the Indian channel Star Plus broadcast the remake of this show as Dil Sambhal Jaa Zara. A Romanian adaptation was also produced by Antena 1 under the title Fructul oprit in 2018; Antena 1 was sued by the writers of Aşk-ı Memnu in 2020 and lost all rights to Fructul oprit, as a court has decided that way too many scenes had been precisely copied. The film "Bihter" taking place in 1920s is published in Amazon Prime. It is not a direct adaptation of novel. It is starring Farah Zeynep Abdullah as Bihter, Boran Kuzum as Behlül.

Country	Original title	English title	Release date	Note
United States	Pasión Prohibida	Passion Prohibited	2013	
India	Dil Sambhal Jaa Zara Ek prem kahani	Oh Heart Control Yourself	2017, 2024	
Romania	Fructul oprit		2018	

== International broadcasts ==
Aşk-ı Memnu has broken rating records in Turkey. The series is the top-rated series there. A major hit in Pakistan with 11.9 ratings on its last episode. It was seen by more than 90 million people in Pakistan. Aired thrice, it was the first foreign drama to get so many ratings in Pakistan. The series was renewed for a fourth time in Pakistan and is currently airing on a YouTube Channel "Dramas Central" in partnership with Kanal D and the Dot Republic Media. Aşk-ı Memnu was dubbed in many languages, including Urdu, Persian, Arabic, Hindi, Portuguese, Amharic and Spanish. Broadcasters carrying the series include.

- Ethiopia - Kana TV (Dubbed in Amharic language)
- Turkey – Kanal D
- Bosnia & Herzegovina – Hayat TV, Face TV
- Afghanistan – Tolo TV
- Pakistan – Urdu 1 (Dubbed in Urdu language)
- Pakistan – Dramas Central (YouTube) (Dubbed in Urdu language)
- America and Europe – Rishtey TV (Dubbed in Hindi language)
- Bangladesh – Channel I (Dubbed in Bengali language)
- Saudi Arabia – MBC4, MBC Max
- Egypt – Melody Drama, Mix One, MBC Masr, CBC, CBC Drama
- Lebanon – LBC
- Iran – GEM Classic Channel (Dubbed in Persian language)
- Bulgaria – bTV, bTV Lady, Nova TV, Diema Family
- Montenegro – TV In
- Morocco – 2M Maroc
- Tunisia – Nessma TV
- Croatia – Nova TV, Doma TV
- Serbia – Prva TV
- Hungary – TV2
- Greece – ANT1
- Slovenia – POP TV
- Slovakia – TV Doma
- Romania – Kanal D, Pro 2
- China – XJTV (Dubbed in Uyghur language)
- Israel – Viva
- Kazakhstan – 31 Kanal
- Uzbekistan
- Macedonia – Kanal 5
- Lithuania – LNK
- Albania – Klan TV
- Georgia – Maestro TV
- Chile – Canal 13
- Latvia – LNT
- Estonia – Kanal 2
- Ecuador – Gama TV
- Peru – Latina Televisión
- Paraguay – Telefuturo
- Argentina – Telefe
- Brazil – Band (Dubbed in Portuguese language)
- Colombia – Caracol Televisión
- Mexico – Imagen TV
- Czech Republic – Kino Barrandov
- United States - Univision Dubbed in Spanish. Set to premiere in 2020.
