= Çarpışma =

Television series

- Also known as: Crash
- Genre: Action; Crime; Thriller
- Written by: Ali Aydın
- Directed by: Uluç Bayraktar (episodes 1–6, 10–24); Ahmet Katıksız (episodes 7–9); U. Hakan Eren (episodes 7–9)
- Starring: Kıvanç Tatlıtuğ; Elçin Sangu; Onur Saylak; Melisa Aslı Pamuk; Alperen Duymaz
- Theme music composer: Toygar Işıklı
- Country of origin: Turkey
- Original language: Turkish
- No. of seasons: 1
- No. of episodes: 24

Production
- Producers: Kerem Çatay; Pelin Diştaş
- Running time: 140 minutes
- Production company: Ay Yapım

Original release
- Network: Show TV
- Release: November 22, 2018 – May 30, 2019

Çarpışma (English title: Crash) is a Turkish action thriller television series starring Kıvanç Tatlıtuğ, Elçin Sangu, Onur Saylak, Melisa Aslı Pamuk and Alperen Duymaz. It was premiered on Show TV on November 22, 2018, and concluded on May 30, 2019.

== Plot ==
Kadir Adalı is the Chief Commissioner of the Organized Crime Branch of the Istanbul Police Department. The moment he loses his wife and daughter in a terrorist act, his happy family life is destroyed. Feeling very sorry for what had happened and suffering from this loss, he decided to end his life. Without realizing it, he causes a catastrophe that changes the lives of four people. Four cars, four people, four lives, four destinies collide. In one of the cars is his childhood friend Zeynep, with whom he grew up in an orphanage and was about to be married, but he refused to do so because of his strong desire to work in the police as his father was a police officer who was killed during his duty. So, Kadir marries another friend from the orphanage, Aslı, instead. Zeynep then marries Galip Tunç and starts working as a bank manager and gives birth to a daughter named Aylin, but Galip owes a mob that kidnaps her daughter Aylin after Galip escapes from Turkey and asks Zeynep to pay her husband's debts. Slowly And for this reason, she robs the bank where she works. After her arrest, she asks Kadir for help to save her daughter. In another car is Zeynep's lawyer, Cemre Gür, the daughter of Veli's lawyer, Selim, who is engaged to Demir. One of them, Kerem, a powerful friend in the fourth car, stabbed him. The Kerem partner, Yakup, uses this recording to blacken Demir and Belma.

== Cast ==
- Kıvanç Tatlıtuğ as Kadir Adalı
- Elçin Sangu as Zeynep Tunç
- Onur Saylak as Veli Cevher
- Melisa Aslı Pamuk as Cemre Gür
- Alperen Duymaz as Kerem Korkmaz
- Erkan Can as Haydar
- Mustafa Uğurlu as Selim Gür
- Rojda Demirer as Belma Gür
- Merve Çağıran as Meral
- Hakan Kurtaş as Demir
- İsmail Demirci as Galip Tunç
- Gonca Cilasun sa Serpil Korkmaz
- Yıldırım Şimşek as Ömer Korkmaz
- Furkan Kalabalık as Adem
- Gökçen Çiftçi as Aylin Tunç
- Efecan Şenolsun as Yakup
- Buçe Buse Kahraman as Meltem
- Sevtap Özaltun as Aslı Adalı
- Merve Nil Güder as Deniz Adalı
- Ayşe İrem İpek as young Zeynep
- Kivanç Gedük as young Kadir
- Ali Sürmeli as Arif/Zarif/Cansiz, a sadistic, deranged serial killer, Kadir's biological father and the series' main antagonist.
- Ivo Arakov as Ivan Sokurov

== Awards and nominations ==
Year	Award	Category	Recipient	Result
2019	Seoul International Drama Awards	Best Drama Series (Silver Award)	Çarpışma	Won
2019	Seoul International Drama Awards	Best Actor	Kıvanç Tatlıtuğ	Nominated
