= Halid Ziya Uşaklıgil =

Turkish author, poet, and playwright (1866–1945)

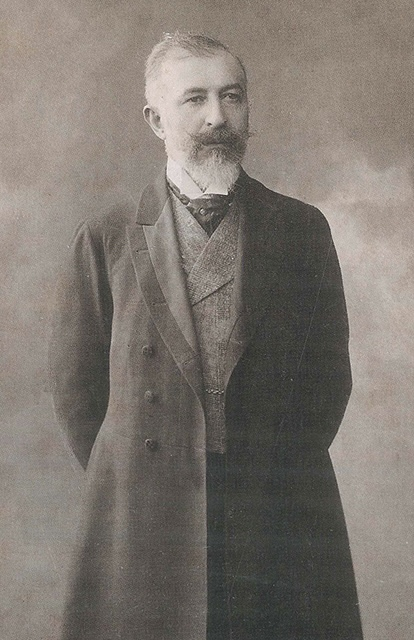
- Uşaklıgil in 1912
- Born: 1866; Constantinople, Ottoman Empire
- Died: 27 March 1945 (aged 78–79); Istanbul, Turkey
- Occupation: Writer
- Relatives: Latife Uşşaki (cousin)

Halid Ziya Uşaklıgil (also spelled Halit and Uşakizâde) (Turkish pronunciation: [haːˈlit ziˈjaː uˌʃaklɯˈɟil]; 1866 – 27 March 1945) was a Turkish author, poet, and playwright. A part of the Edebiyat-ı Cedide ("New Literature") movement of the late Ottoman Empire, he was the founder of and contributor to many literary movements and institutions, including his flagship Servet-i Fünun ("The Wealth of Knowledge") journal. He was a strong critic of the Sultan Abdul Hamid II, which led to the censorship of much of his work by the Ottoman government. His many novels, plays, short stories, and essays include his 1899 romance novel Aşk-ı Memnu ("Forbidden Love"), which has been adapted into an internationally successful television series of the same name.

== Biography ==
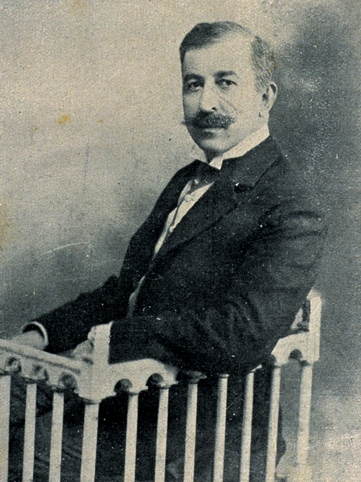
Halid Ziya Uşaklıgil in his middle age

Halid Ziya Uşaklıgil was born in Istanbul in 1866. He went to primary school and then attended the secondary school Fatih Rüştiyesi in the same city. His family moved to Izmir in 1879. He completed his secondary education in Izmir attending the school which now is known as İzmir Atatürk Lisesi. He later attended an Armenian Catholic school to learn French where he completed his first translation works.

Uşaklıgil founded the newspaper Hizmet in 1886. After 1896 his works were published in the Turkish literary journal Servet-i Fünun, known for its adoption of European literary styles.

When his novel Kırık Hayatlar (Broken Lives) was censored by the Ottoman regime of Abdul Hamid II in 1901, he stopped publishing novels. He contributed to Mehâsin, a women's magazine which was started in the aftermath of the Young Turk Revolution in 1908. In addition, his novel Ferdi ve Şürekası (Ottoman Turkish: Ferdi and his Associates) was serialized in the magazine. Kırık Hayatlar could only be published in 1923 after the establishment of modern Turkey.

Uşaklıgil's early style is based closely on French Romanticism and most of his novels deal with unfulfilled love. His work is distinguished from contemporary Turkish literature by its more concrete form and creates its own artistic language through the use of Persian and Arabic loanwords.

In his later years the writer moved to the village of San Stefano near Istanbul. In 1926, when a new law was imposed to give a Turkish name to each community, he suggested to give to the village its present name of Yeşilköy (literally: "Green Village").

== Bibliography ==
Novels

- Nemide (1889)
- Bir Ölünün Defteri (1889)
- Ferdi ve Şürekâsı (1894)
- Mai ve Siyah (1897)
- Aşk-ı Memnu (1900)
- Kırık Hayatlar (1923)

Short stories

- Bir Muhtıranın Son Yaprakları (1888)
- Bir İzdivacın Tarih-i Muaşakası (1888)
- Heyhat (1894)
- Solgun Demet (1901)
- Sepette Bulunmuş (1920)
- Bir Hikâye-i Sevda (1922)
- Hepsinden Acı (1934)
- Onu Beklerken (1935)
- Aşka Dair (1936)
- İhtiyar Dost (1939)
- Kadın Pençesinde (1939)
- İzmir Hikâyeleri (1950) (posthumous)

Dramas

- Kabus (1918)

Memoirs

- Anı: Kırk Yıl (1936)
- Saray ve Ötesi (1942)
- Bir Acı Hikâye (1942)

Poetry

- Mensur Şiirler (1889)

Essays

- Sanata Dair (1938–1955) (three volumes)

== Sources ==
- Tuna, Turgay (2004). Ayastefanos'tan Yeşilköy'e (in Turkish).

== Relevant literature ==
- Katiboğlu, Monica. "Translating Ottoman Turkish into Turkish: linguistic hospitality as a politics of intralingual translation." Translation Studies (2023): 1-16.
