= Aşk-ı Memnu (novel) =

1899 novel by Halit Ziya Uşaklıgil

The Forbidden Love
- Author: Halit Ziya Uşaklıgil
- Original title: Aşk-ı Memnu
- Language: Turkish
- Publisher: Nilüfer
- Publication date: 1899
- Publication place: Turkey

Aşk-ı Memnu (Turkish pronunciation: [aʃkɯ memˈnuː]; Ottoman Turkish: عشق ممنوع, lit. 'The Forbidden Love') is a Turkish romance novel by Halit Ziya Uşaklıgil, who was part of the Edebiyat-ı Cedide ("New Literature") movement of the late Ottoman Empire. The novel was serialized in 1899 and 1900 in Servet-i Fünun, a leading Turkish literary magazine of the time.

== Adaptations ==
Aşk-ı Memnu was adapted by Halit Refiğ into a TV series in 1975, considered to be the first miniseries on Turkish television. Another TV series adaptation named Aşk-ı Memnu aired from 2008 to 2010. It takes place in modern-day Istanbul instead of the novel's late 19th-century setting. Telemundo produced a Spanish adaptation of the serial, Pasión prohibida, which was set in Miami.

The novel was made into a three-act play by Tarık Günersel, who also wrote a libretto for the Turkish composer Selman Ada, leading to an opera.
