= Gumus =

Gumus may refer to:

- Gümüş, various things
- Gumuz people or Gumus, an Ethiopian ethnic group
