= Itır Esen =

Turkish actress (born 1956)

- Born: 17 December 1956 (age 69); Istanbul, Turkey
- Occupation: Actress

Itır Esen (born 17 December 1956) is a Turkish film actress. She is the daughter of film actor Hayri Esen. Her niece, also named Itır Esen, is a model.

== Biography ==
Itır Esen was born in Istanbul on 17 December 1956 and started out as a fashion model for the newspaper Milliyet. She acted in a popular TV series called "Aşk-ı Memnu" and made her film debut in "Bizim Aile" opposite Tarık Akan. She is also known for Aile Şerefi and Gülen Gözler.

She married Turkish film director Yavuz Turgul and retired from acting. In the 2000s (decade) she came out of retirement to occasionally act in supporting roles. She has two children.

Esen is an avid fan of Beşiktaş J.K. and currently contributes as an online columnist to an online news website affiliated with the fans of the club.

== Filmography ==
- Bizim Aile (1975)
- Gençlik Köprüsü (1975)
- Aile Şerefi (1976)
- Gülen Gözler (1977)
- Benim Gibi Sevenler (1977)
- Liseli Kızlar (1977)
- Benim Gibi Sevenler (1977)
- Cennetin Çocukları (1977)
- Rezil (1978)
- Sis ve Gece (2006)
- Sınav (2006)
- Güneşi Gördüm (2009)
- Adını Sen Koy (2009)
- Taş Mektep (2012)
- Aşk Ağlatır (2013)
- Benim Oynar Mısın (2013)
- Peri Masalı (2013)
- Annem (2019)
- Şaban Oğlu Şaban Oğlu Şaban (2026)

=== Web Series ===
- Saygı (2020)
- Kuş Uçuşu (2023)

=== Tv Series ===
- Aşk-ı Memnu (1975)
- Yeditepe İstanbul (2001)
- Aliye (2004)
- Çemberimde Gül Oya (2004)
- Alanya Almanya (2005)
- Yeniden Çalıkuşu (2005)
- Arka Sokaklar (2006)
- Ahh İstanbul (2006)
- Doktorlar (2006)
- Pertev Bey'in Üç Kızı (2006)
- Kuzey Rüzgarı (2007)
- Milyonda Bir (2008)
- Deli Saraylı (2010)
- Maskeli Balo (2010)
- Mavi Kelebekler (2012)
- Kurt Kanunu (2012)
- Fatih Harbiye (2013)
- Gamsız Hayat (2015)
- Kördüğüm (2016)
- Bir Deli Sevda (2017)
- Zümrüdüanka (2020)
- Kırmızı Oda (2021)
