= The Butterfly's Dream (2013 film) =

2013 film

- Film poster
- Directed by: Yılmaz Erdoğan
- Written by: Yılmaz Erdoğan
- Produced by: Necati Akpınar
- Starring: Kıvanç Tatlıtuğ; Mert Fırat; Belçim Bilgin; Farah Zeynep Abdullah; Yılmaz Erdoğan
- Cinematography: Gökhan Tiryaki
- Music by: Rahman Altin
- Release date: 22 February 2013
- Running time: 138 minutes
- Country: Turkey
- Language: Turkish

The Butterfly's Dream (Turkish: Kelebeğin Rüyası) is a 2013 Turkish drama film written and directed by Yılmaz Erdoğan. The film was selected as the Turkish entry for the Best Foreign Language Film at the 86th Academy Awards, but it was not nominated.

Rahman Altın, the composer of the score to the film won the "World Soundtrack Awards - Public Choice Award" at the 40th Film Fest Gent.

== Plot ==
The movie starts in Zonguldak, in 1941. While two young poet Muzaffar Tayyip Uslu (Kıvanç Tatlıtuğ) and Rüştü Onur (Mert Fırat) continue their civil service life in this newly modernized mining city, they also live together with art, literature, and most poetry, they have a dream to become a butterfly as to fly on sky as to become a famous poet. While the young Republic, newly rising on its feet, was trying to modernize, on the one hand, World War II was experienced in Europe in the same years. In a society where poetry and art have not yet matured, these two tuberculosis young people are trying to make all segments of society love poetry. They saw a beautiful girl Suzan Özsöy (Belçim Bilgin) and they made a bet to write poetry. Whoever's she prefers, wins the bet. Suzan likes Rustu's poem but Muzaffar wins the heart of Suzan. Muzaffer falls in love with Suzan. Suzan, who is still a high school student, becomes close friends with the two young people, despite her family's disapproval. But tuberculosis, the plague of the 1940s, is increasingly threatening the health of both young people. Muzaffer and Onur both suffer from tuberculosis. Rustu becomes very ill and admits to the hospital, Where he meets a girl Mediha Sessiz (Farah Zeynep Abdullah) who was also struggling with her illness, and falls for her.

== Summary ==
After its release in February 2013, director Yılmaz Erdoğan's feature film Kelebeğin Rüyası (The Butterfly's Dream) was also selected by Turkish Minister of Culture and Tourism, Ömer Çelikas, as Turkey's candidate for the 2014's Academy Awards. The storyline, set in the early 1940s of Turkey, revolves around two good male friends, Rüştü Onur and Muzaffer Tayyip Uslu. They are members of the Garip movement. They make a living out of publishing their poems at a time when life appears hard with the World War II in its full swing across the world. The story takes a turn when both fall in love with other people and life changes for them trying to survive against social class system and religious barriers of the time, which jeopardizes their love life, their friendship and their profession.

== Cast ==
- Kıvanç Tatlıtuğ as Muzaffer Tayyip Uslu
- Mert Fırat as Rüştü Onur
- Belçim Bilgin as Suzan Özsoy
- Farah Zeynep Abdullah as Mediha Sessiz
- Yılmaz Erdoğan as Behçet Necatigil
- Ahmet Mümtaz Taylan as Zikri Özsoy
- Adem Atbas as Fatih
- Taner Birsel as İsmail Uslu
- Selman Ünlüsoy as Hasta
- Mücahit Avci as Kenan
- Alper Baydar as Doctor

== See also ==
- List of submissions to the 86th Academy Awards for Best Foreign Language Film
- List of Turkish submissions for the Academy Award for Best Foreign Language Film
