= Kuzey Güney =

Turkish television drama series

- Genre: Drama; Adventure; Action; Crime
- Written by: Ece Yörenç; Melek Gençoğlu
- Directed by: Hilal Saral; Mehmet Ada Öztekin; Nezaket Çoşkun Sevinç
- Starring: Kıvanç Tatlıtuğ; Buğra Gülsoy; Öykü Karayel
- Country of origin: Turkey
- Original language: Turkish
- No. of seasons: 2
- No. of episodes: 80

Production
- Executive producer: Kerem Çatay
- Production locations: Istanbul, Turkey, Tbilisi, Georgia

Original release
- Network: Kanal D
- Release: September 7, 2011 – June 26, 2013

Related
- Rich Man, Poor Man (1976)

Kuzey Güney (transl. North South) is a Turkish television drama series. The scenarists are Ece Yörenç and Melek Gençoğlu. The series stars Kıvanç Tatlıtuğ as Kuzey Tekinoğlu, a tough and rebellious son of an Istanbul baker, who comes back from prison four years after he confesses to a crime his brother, Güney, (Buğra Gülsoy) committed.

The series was broadcast on channel Kanal D in Turkey and produced by Ay Yapım. It premiered on September 7, 2011. Kuzey Güney aired on Wednesday at 8 pm (EEST, UTC+03:00) on Kanal D and from episode 61 onwards at 10 pm (EEST). The final episode was aired on June 26, 2013, after 80 episodes and 2 seasons.

== Plot ==
Kuzey (Kıvanç Tatlıtuğ) and Güney (Buğra Gülsoy) are brothers with contrasting personalities. Kuzey is rebellious but kind-hearted, while Güney is calm. The rivalry between the two brothers reaches a boiling point when they both fall in love with the same girl who is named Cemre (Öykü Karayel). A tragic event drives the girl into the arms of one, while the other must bounce back from insurmountable odds.

== Series overview ==
Season	Episodes	Originally released	
Season	Episodes	First released	Last released
1	40	September 7, 2011	June 20, 2012
2	40	September 12, 2012	June 26, 2013

== Cast and characters ==
=== Main ===
- Kıvanç Tatlıtuğ as Kuzey Tekinoğlu, a tough and rebellious son (who inherited the anger from his father), of an Istanbul baker Sami. He had a noble and kind heart from inside, he later turned into a bold boxer.
- Buğra Gülsoy as Güney Tekinoğlu, Kuzey's brother and a calm young man, who later becomes a rich businessman
- Öykü Karayel as Cemre Çayak, the love interest of Kuzey and Güney, was raised by her mother.

=== Supporting ===
- Bade İşçil as Banu Sinaner, Güney's wife, committed suicide during pregnancy by jumping from the hospital building in front of Güney.
- Zerrin Tekindor as Gülten Çayak, hairdresser, Cemre's mother.
- Mustafa Avkıran as Sami Tekinoğlu, father of Kuzey and Güney, connected more to Kuzey.
- Semra Dinçer as Handan Tekinoğlu, Kuzey, and Güney's mother, connected more to Güney later as well to Kuzey.
- Ertan Dönmez as Kazim, shop owner, Cemre's father, and Gülten's first love interest.
- Hazar Ergüçlü as Simay Canaş, Kuzey's ex-wife.
- Çağdaş Onur Öztürk as Barış Hakmen, Banu's maternal half-brother, he started troubles for Kuzey and Cemre, he hates Güney from the first time he watches him.
- Hale Soygazi as Ebru Sinaner, Banu and Barış's mother and Burak's stepmother.
- Turgay Kantürk as Ferhat, the worst enemy of Kuzey, who killed Ali, later he was killed by Güney.
- Merve Boluğur as Zeynep, daughter of Huseyin the photographer, fell in love with Kuzey.
- Rıza Kocaoğlu as Ali Güntan, a close friend and a companion to Kuzey, killed by Ferhat.
- Serhat Teoman as Burak Çatalcalı, Banu's paternal half-brother.
- Göksen Ateş as Venüs Tezerel, Barış's girlfriend, also had an affair with Burak.
- Kaan Tasaner as Şeref, a police detective who looks after Kuzey, for catching Ferhat.

== International broadcast ==
These series have been telecasted internationally and had great TRPs in many countries, including the Arab world and Bosnia-Herzegovina. It was also aired in Pakistan on Urdu 1 with great TRPs in Urdu dubbing, and was being broadcast on Iranian television channel GEM TV dubbed in Persian language under the same name. In Indian Zindagi TV, it was dubbed in Hindi.

== Awards ==
Year	Award	Winner	Presenter
2011	The best series of the year	Kuzey Güney	Galatasaray University
2011	The best TV series actor	Kıvanç Tatlıtuğ	Galatasaray University
2011	The most-loved TV series actor	Kıvanç Tatlıtuğ	Yıldız Technical University
2012	The best series theme music	Kuzey Güney / Toygar Işıklı	Istanbul Kültür University
2012	The best series of the year	Kuzey Güney	İzmir University of Economics
2012	The best TV series actor	Kıvanç Tatlıtuğ	Golden Butterfly Awards
2012	The best TV series actor	Buğra Gülsoy	Darüşşafaka Association
2012	Altin Kelebek best actor	Kıvanç Tatlıtuğ	Altin Kelebek
2012	The best series theme music	Kuzey Güney / Toygar Işıklı	Turkish Student Council
2012	The best drama series actor	Kıvanç Tatlıtuğ	Golden Objective Awards
2012	Best Actress in a Supporting Role - Drama	Zerrin Tekindor	4th Antalya Tv Awards
2013	Best Series Awards	Kuzey Güney	Istanbul Kültür University
2013	En İyi Yardımcı Kadın Oyuncu	Zerrin Tekindor	TelevizyonDizisi.com En İyiler Ödülleri
2013	Iyi Dizi Müziği	Kuzey Güney /Toygar Işıklı	Türkiye Öğrenci Konseyi-Yarinin Liderleri
2013	Best Actor Award	Kıvanç Tatlıtuğ	Yeditepe University
2013	En İyi Senaryo( Kuzey Guney)	Ece Yorenc - Melek Gencoglu	Altin Kelebek
