= Brave and Beautiful =

2016 Turkish thriller television series

- Genre: Romance; Drama; Thriller
- Written by: Ece Yörenç; Elif Usman; Serdar Soydan; Deniz Büyükkirli
- Starring: Kıvanç Tatlıtuğ; Tuba Büyüküstün
- Theme music composer: Toygar Işıklı
- Country of origin: Turkey
- Original language: Turkish
- No. of seasons: 1
- No. of episodes: 32

Production
- Producers: Kerem Çatay; Pelin Diştaş Yaşaroğlu
- Production locations: Istanbul; Koaceli
- Running time: 2 hours each episode
- Production company: Ay Yapım

Original release
- Network: Star TV
- Release: 10 November 2016 – 22 June 2017

Brave and Beautiful (Turkish: Cesur ve Güzel) is a Turkish thriller television series produced by Ay Yapım that was aired on Star TV on 10 November 2016. It stars Kıvanç Tatlıtuğ as Cesur Alemdaroğlu and Tuba Büyüküstün as Sühan Korludağ.

== Synopsis ==
Cesur Alemdaroğlu (Kivanç Tatlituğ) comes back to Korludağ, a small town outside Istanbul with a mission: to take revenge on Tahsin Korludağ (Tamer Levent) because of their family enmity. The only thing that he hadn't taken into account was that he would fall in love with Sühan Korludağ (Tuba Büyüküstün), the beautiful daughter of the man whom he believes killed his father. Sühan is an independent and successful businesswoman who creates her own brand of perfumes and glass products. Fiercely loyal to her family, Sühan doesn't fully trust Cesur at first, but as the lies and misdeeds of Korludağ are uncovered one after another, she finds herself torn between her father and the man she has grown to love. Cesur realizes Korludağ has many enemies around him when things take a more dangerous twist as Rıza Chirpiji (Yiğit Özşener), the killer brother of Adalet Korludağ (Nihan Büyükağaç) a.k.a. Tahsin Korludağ's mistress, is released after a 30-year jail sentence. A huge game of cat-and-mice ensues as Cesur and Sühan find themselves in the midst of a long historical family feud. Sühan and Cesur's relationship deepens and she becomes pregnant from Cesur. After a long battle between Cesur and Tahsin, Rıza attempts to kill Sühan, which makes them reach an agreement. Sühan is critically injured and taken to hospital. Her father Tahsin and Cesur cooperate to set a trap for Rıza, while seeking a final escape. Rıza is captured by Cesur and Tahsin. When Cesur is about to kill him, Tahsin saves Cesur from being killed, sacrificing himself with Rıza in a boat gas explosion. In the end Sühan gives birth to Cesur's child, the two are then seen on a voyage with their baby boy, smiling at each other

== Cast ==
- Kıvanç Tatlıtuğ as Cesur Alemdaroğlu Karahasanoğlu
- Tuba Büyüküstün as Sühan Korludağ
- Tamer Levent as Tahsin Korludağ
- Devrim Yakut as Mihriban Aydınbaş
- Erkan Avcı as Korhan Korludağ
- Serkan Altunorak as Bülent Aydınbaş
- Sezin Akbaşoğulları as Cahide Korludağ
- Müfit Kayacan as Rıfat İlbey
- Nihan Büyükağaç as Adalet Soyözlü
- Fırat Altunmeşe as Kemal
- Irmak Örnek as Şirin
- Okday Korunan as Salih
- Gözde Türkpençe as Banu
- Işıl Dayıoğlu as Reyhan
- Zeynep Kızıltan as Hülya
- Cansu Türedi as Necla
- Tilbe Saran as Fügen Karahasanoğlu
- Ali Pinar as Hasan Karahasanoğlu
- Yiğit Özşener as Rıza

== Series overview ==
Season	No. of Episodes	Start of the Season	End of the Season	Episodes	TV Channel
1	101	November 10, 2016	June 22, 2017	1 - 32	Star TV

== Accolades ==
Year	Name of Competition	Category	Result	Nominee(s)
2016	GQ Turkey Awards	Men Of The Year	Won	Kivanc Tatlitug
2017	TelevisionDisisi.com Best Awards	Best Couple (Cesur & Suhan)	Won	Kivanc & Tuba
2017	Sayidaty magazine	Best Actor	Won	Kivanc Tatlitug
2017	Sayidaty magazine	Best Actress	Won	Tuba Büyüküstün
2017	Seoul International Drama Awards	Excellence Award for Long Drama	Won	Brave and Beautiful
2017	Seoul International Drama Awards	Best Actor	Nominated	Kivanc Tatlitug
2017	Seoul International Drama Awards	Best Director	Nominated	Ali Bilgin
2017	TelevisionDisisi.com Best Awards	Best Actress	Pending	Tuba Büyüküstün
2017	Distinctive International Arab Festivals Awards	Best Couple	Won	Kivanc & Tuba
2017	Golden Butterfly Award	Miracle Maker Award	Won	Kivanc
2017	Golden Butterfly Award	Miracle Maker Award	Won	Tuba
2018	46th International Emmy Awards	Best Telenovela	Nominated	Brave and Beautiful

== See also ==
- Television in Turkey
- List of Turkish television series
- Turkish television drama
