= Istanbul Kültür University =

Turkish private university located in İstanbul

- Type: Private
- Established: 1997
- Rector: Prof.Dr. Fadime Üney Yüksektepe
- Academic staff: 1,193
- Students: 15,166
- Location: Istanbul, Turkey; 40°59′28″N 28°49′54″E
- Campus: Ataköy Campus; Şirinevler Campus; İncirli Campus; Basın Ekspres Campus
- Language: English / Turkish
- Website: www.iku.edu.tr

University rankings

Regional – Overall
- QS Emerging Europe and Central Asia: 401-450 (2022)

İstanbul Kültür University (İKÜ) is one of the many private universities located in Istanbul, Turkey. It has a total of four campuses all in close proximity to each other in the western part of Istanbul. The three campuses are located in Şirinevler, İncirli, Basın Ekspres and Ataköy This non-profit University was founded in 1997; its Industrial Engineering started in the 1997–98 academic year. The university has five schools and two vocational schools. In 2009, Global Political Trends Center, a policy oriented research (think tank) institution, was founded under the auspices of the university.

Istanbul Kültür University conducts its academic and scientific activities with a total of 59 departments and programs, in eight faculties, namely Faculty of Science and Letters, Faculty of Education, Faculty of Arts and Design, Faculty of Law, Faculty of Economic and Administrative Sciences, Faculty of Architecture, Faculty of Engineering and Faculty of Health Sciences, and in two vocational schools, namely Vocational School and Vocational School of Justice. In addition, it provides postgraduate education at 54 Master's and 11 Ph.D. programs within the body of the Institute

== İKÜ faculties ==
=== Faculty of Law ===
Faculty Dean: Prof. Dr. Dr. h.c. mult. Bahri Öztürk

- Department of Law

=== Faculty of Economics and Administrative Sciences ===
Faculty Dean: Prof. Dr. Müge Çetiner

- Entrepreneurship
- Economics
- Business Administration (Turkish/English)
- International Trade (Turkish/English)
- International Relations (English)

=== Faculty of Art and Design ===
Faculty Dean: Prof. Dr. Mehmet Üstünipek

- Cartoon and Animation
- Communication Arts
- Communication Design
- Arts Management
- Cinema and Television
- New Media and Communication

=== Faculty of Architecture ===
Faculty Dean: Prof. Dr. Neslihan Dostoglu Faculty Vice Dean: Prof. Dr. Esra Bostancioglu Faculty Vice Dean: Assoc. Prof. Rana Kutlu

- Architecture
- Interior Architecture and Environmental Design

=== Faculty of Engineering ===
Faculty Dean: Prof.Dr. Tülin Aktin

- Electrical&Electronics Engineering
- Industrial Engineering
- Computer Engineering
- Civil Engineering

=== Faculty of Science and Letters ===
Faculty Dean: Prof. Dr. Ömür Ceylan

- Physics
- English Language and Literature
- Mathematics-Computer Sciences
- Molecular Biology and Genetics
- Psychology
- Turkish Language and Literature

=== Faculty of Education ===
Faculty Dean: Prof. Dr. Alim Kaya

- Educational Sciences
- Basic Education
- Foreign Languages Education

=== Faculty of Health Sciences ===
Faculty Dean: Prof. Dr. Asiye Gül

- Department of Physiotherapy and Rehabilitation
- Department of Nutrition and Dietetics
- Department of Nursing

== Vocational Schools ==
=== Vocational School of Justice ===
Vocational School Director: Assist Prof. Durmus Tezcan

- Justice Program

=== Vocational school ===
Vocational School Director: Prof. Mehmet Özer

- Alternative Energy Sources
- Banking and Insurance (Formal)
- Banking and Insurance (Evening Education)
- Computer Programming
- Office Management and Executive Assistance
- Child Development
- Foreign Trade
- Digital Media and Marketing
- Electronics Technology
- Household Linens
- Graphic Design
- Public Relations and Publicity
- Air Logistics
- Air Conditioning and Cooling Technology
- Construction Technology
- Business Management
- Logistics
- Fashion Design
- Opticianry
- Radio and Television Technology
- Management of Health Institutions
- Civil Air Transportation Management
- Civil Aviation Cabin Services
- Medical Documentation and Secretarial
- Tourism and Hotel Management
- Aircraft Technology
- Flight Operations Management
- Graduate Studies

== Institute of Graduate Studies ==
Institute Director: Prof. Dr. Nebile Korucuoğlu

=== M.S/M.A Programs ===
- Computer Engineering
- Educational Management And Planning
- Electrical&Electronics Engineering
- Physics
- Geotechnics
- Interior Architecture
- Communication Arts
- Occupational Health and Safety
- Business Administration
- Business Management
- Public Law
- Mathematics-Computer
- Architectural Design
- Molecular Biology And Genetics
- Engineering Management
- Engineering Management
- Private Law
- Monetary and Capital Markets
- Project Management
- Arts Management
- Sports Law
- Turkish Language and Literature
- International Relations
- Production Economics
- Construction
- Construction
- Construction Management And Technology
- Managerial Economics

=== PhD programs ===
- Geotechnics PhD Program
- Business Administration PhD Program
- Public Law PhD Program
- Mathematics PhD Program
- Architecture PhD Program
- Molecular Biology And Genetics PhD Program
- Private Law PhD Program
- Project Management PhD Program
- Turkish Language and Literature PhD Program
- Construction PhD Program

== Application and research centers ==
Research activities at IKU are carried out within the body of research centers as well as faculties and institutes. Research centers are organized as institutions affiliated to the rectorate, and multidisciplinary research is carried out in these centers with the activities of implementing commercial and industrial organizations.

- AGMER - Family Businesses and Entrepreneurship Application and Research Center
- ATAMER - Atatürk's Principles and the History of the Turkish Revolution Research and Application Center
- R&D Center
- CEHAMER - Criminal Law Application and Research Center
- FIHAMER - Intellectual Property Rights Application and Research Center
- GEOMER - Geomatics Application and Research Center
- GSUAM - Fine Arts Application and Research Center
- IKÜ-HAM - Istanbul Kültür University, Motion Analysis Application and Evaluation, Application and Research Center
- IKÜSEM - Continuing Education Center
- IKÜTÜMER - Turkish and Foreign Languages Teaching Application and Research Center
- PDR - Psychological Counseling and Guidance
- UZEMER - Distance Education Application and Research Center

== European and International Relations Center ==
European and International Center (EIC), which conducts Istanbul Kültür University's relations with universities and higher education institutions abroad, works both for various international higher education institutions, especially universities in 27 countries that have become a member of the European Union that Turkey is a candidate for full membership and it also works in the fields of mutual cooperation activities, structuring and executing corporate projects. Lifelong Learning Program - LLP Institution Coordinator-ship offers IKU students the opportunity to study at more than 100 universities abroad and to do internships in international companies. Within the scope of Template:Olgu Lifelong Learning Program, there are also many EU Education Programs such as LEONARDO, which is a vocational education program, and GRUNDTVIG for adults, and JEAN MONNET studies as well as ERASMUS program.

== Life on campus ==
İstanbul Kültür University provides education on four campuses Ataköy, Şirinevler, İncirli and Basın Ekspres. Faculty of Science and Letters, Faculty of Engineering, Faculty of Architecture and Faculty of Art and Design are on Ataköy Campus; Faculty of Economics and Administrative Sciences and Faculty of Education are on Basın Ekpres Campus; Faculty of Law, Faculty of Health Sciences, Vocational School of Justice and English Preparatory Classes are on Şirinevler Campus; and Vocational School is on İncirli Campus. Transportation between campuses is provided by shuttle service.

On campuses, students are provided with the opportunity to have their meals and other needs.

In the morning and evening, shuttle services to Bakırköy Seabus are provided for the students who come from Kadıköy and Bostancı.

Foreign relations İKÜ is a member of the Caucasus Universities Association.
