= Fetih 1453 =

- Theatrical release poster
- Directed by: Faruk Aksoy
- Written by: İrfan Saruhan
- Based on: Fall of Constantinople
- Produced by: Ayşe Germen
- Starring: Devrim Evin; İbrahim Çelikkol; Dilek Serbest
- Music by: Benjamin Wallfisch
- Production company: Aksoy film production
- Distributed by: Tiglon Film; Kinostar
- Release date: February 16, 2012
- Running time: 160 minutes
- Country: Turkey
- Languages: Turkish; Greek; Arabic; Urdu; English
- Budget: $18.2 million
- Box office: $61.2 million (₺183.241.062)

Sultan Muhammad Fetih 1453 (transl. The Conquest 1453) is a 2012 Turkish epic action film directed by Faruk Aksoy and produced by him, Servet Aksoy and Ayşe Germen. Starring Devrim Evin, İbrahim Çelikkol and Dilek Serbest, the film is based on events surrounding the Fall of Constantinople to the Ottoman Turks during the reign of Sultan Mehmed II.

== Plot ==
The film opens in Medina during the time of the Islamic prophet Muhammad, 627 AD. Abu Ayyub tells other sahabas that Constantinople will be conquered by a blessed commander and army.

The story shifts abruptly to the 15th century. Sultan Muhammad al-Fatih was given the throne by his father Murad II when he was 12; he learns of his father's death while governing the Sanjak of Saruhan. This causes him much grief and paves the way for his ascension to the throne again, after the death of his brother Fathıl IV. When Sultan Mehmet had first ascended the throne, he was also 12 years old. Murad II, suffocated by the political hostility of his margraves and viziers, relinquished the throne due to the impact of his deep grief caused by his beloved son Mohamed's death and enthroned Mehmet. Grand Vizier Halil Pasha, who had a great influence on the Janissaries and the state, was dissatisfied because of this situation. He was especially troubled with Sultan Mehmet indicating that Constantinople's conquest is vitally essential. He made Sultan Murat inherit the throne again in anticipation of the possibility of crusaders occupying Ottoman territories by taking advantage of Mehmet. Mehmet was suspended from the throne and sent to the Sanjak of Saruhan.

Now, Mehmet succeeds to the throne again and is even more powerful. His priority target is still the conquest of Constantinople. He gains inspiration from the words of Muhammad: “Constantinople will surely be conquered. What a blessed commander is its and what a blessed army is its army.”

He works out everything that will take him to the target. At the outset, Mehmet decides that he should live in peace with contiguous countries until he makes the preparations for his campaign. He sends messengers to the Papal States, to the Kingdom of Hungary, to the Serbian Despotate, to the Kingdom of Poland, to the Republic of Genoa and to the Republic of Venice and notifies them of his intention to live in peace. He restores the dockyard of Gallipoli and because of this action, 100 galleys can be produced there in a year. Meanwhile, the Byzantine Emperor Constantine XI Palaiologos thinks that Sultan Mehmet is inexperienced and lacking in foresight. Constantine demands heavy appropriations, trying to use to his advantage his possession of the captive Prince Orhan. Constantine's main intention is to make Sultan Mehmet lose his reputation by capitulating to his demands. Sultan Mehmet appears to accept his demands, but this is just a strategy of deceit.

As soon as the news of Karaman's rebellion is received, Ottoman armies set out for Akşehir. Karamanoğlu İbrahim was not expecting such a mighty army. He demands peace. Sultan Mehmet accepts the peace, because he does not want his armies to be harmed unnecessarily. After the military expedition, on the return journey, a group of janissaries confront the state tent and ask for payment. They had not actually engaged in battle. In response, Sultan Mehmet sends out enthronements. He also sends into exile the janissary master Kurtçu Doğan. The janissary was an ally of Grand Vizier Halil Pasha. With this incident, Mehmet properly gains dominion over his armies.

Following his return to Adrianople, Mehmet sends a messenger to Emperor Constantine and he declares that he will no longer send the subsidy for the continued captivity of Orhan. Following this incident, Mehmet starts to build the Boğazkesen (Rumelian) Fortress across the Anatolian Fortress. He fully intends to wage war against the Byzantine Empire.

On 29 May 1453, the Byzantine soldiers on the ramparts are overwhelmed while facing Sultan Mehmet and his army.

== Cast ==
Actor name	Role name	Explanation
Devrim Evin	Mehmed II	The 7th Ottoman sultan who seeks to conquer Constantinople. Mehmed's childhood is played by Ege Uslu.
İbrahim Çelikkol	Ulubatlı Hasan	Mehmed's friend and mentor, leader of Ottoman cavalry corps. He martyrs himself when placing an Ottoman banner in the top of Walls of Constantinople while suffering multiple arrow wounds.
Dilek Serbest	Era	Orban's adopted daughter he bought from a slave market in Constantinople. She has a romantic relationship with Hasan. Era's childhood is played by Algun Molla.
Recep Aktuğ	Constantine XI	The last Byzantine emperor. In this film, when he dies, Mehmed orders Byzantine noblemen to bury him in Christian tradition.
Cengiz Coşkun	Knight Giustiniani	Genoese general. He is killed by Hasan.
Erden Alkan	Çandarlı Halil Pasha	Ottoman Grand Vizier serving under Murad II and Mehmed II. He rejects all Mehmed's plans relating to the conquest of Constantinople and urges peace with Byzantium.
Naci Adıgüzel	Grand Duke Notaras	The last Megas Doux of Constantinople. He shows strong opposition towards Constantine's intention to seek help from Vatican and Genoa.
Erdoğan Aydemir	Orban	A Hungarian master who initially proposes his sketch to Doge of Genoa, but the Doge isn't interested in it. Orban refuses Notaras' demand to design a cannon for Byzantium. When Notaras' men attempts to arrest Orban for his refusal, Hasan saves him and Era, his adoptive daughter to Edirne. Orban later design the Great Bombard for the Ottoman Empire used in the siege of Constantinople.
İlker Kurt	Murad II	The 6th Ottoman sultan, father of Mehmed II.
Sedat Mert	Zagan Pasha	An Ottoman military commander who is used to be an ardent advocate for the conquest of Constantinople. He often confronts with Halil Pasha urging to live in peace with Byzantine Empire.
Raif Hikmet Çam	Akshemseddin	One of Mehmed's tutors. He comes to Mehmed in the 40th day of the siege, and motivates the then-upset and frustrated Sultan with the discovery of Abu Ayyub Al Ansari's tomb near the Walls of Constantinople.
Namık Kemal Yiğittürk	Molla Hüsrev	One of Mehmed's tutors who invites Akshemseddin to motivate the Sultan in the 40th day of the siege.
Ömer As	Molla Gürani	One of Mehmed's tutors who invites Akshemseddin to motivate the Sultan in the 40th day of the siege.
Mustafa Atilla Kunt	Şahabettin Pasha	An Ottoman military commander and vizier. He is tasked by Sultan Mehmed II to make three furnaces. During the siege of Constantinople he attacks the city from Tekfur Palace (Palace of the Porphyrogenitus) and the Gate of Caligaria.
Özcan Aliser	Saruca Pasha	An Ottoman military commander and vizier.
Murat Sezal	İsa Pasha	An Ottoman military commander.
Faik Aksoy	Karaca Pasha	An Ottoman military commander. During the siege of Constantinople, he attacks the city from the Gate of Charisius and Blachernae Palace (Ayvansaray).
Hüseyin Santur	Süleyman Pasha	An Ottoman admiral. During the siege of Constantinople, he attacks the city from the Golden Horn. He is banished by Mehmed after the failure to enter the Golden Horn.
Ali Rıza Soydan	Pope	An unnamed Pope of Vatican (the contemporary Pope in that time was Nicholas V).
Ali Ersin Yenar	Doge of Genoa	An unnamed Doge of Genoa who orders Giustiniani to command Genoese army after an assault towards Genoese freight in the Bosphorus (the contemporary Doge in that time was Pietro di Campofregoso).
İzzet Çivril	Cardinal Isidore	A cardinal who offers supports from Vatican to Byzantium.
Adnan Kürkçü	Gennadius Scholarius	An Orthodox theologian who strongly opposes the Emperor's plan to unite Eastern Orthodoxy with Roman Catholicism.
Şahika Koldemir	Gülbahar Hatun	Mehmed's wife, mother of Prince Bayezid.
Edip Tüfekçi	Prince Orhan	Pretender to the Ottoman throne who is an exile in Constantinople. During the siege of Constantinople, he is assigned to defend Port of Langa.
Aslan İzmirli	Karamanoğlu İbrahim	Bey of Karamanids provoked to rebel against Ottoman Empire by Constantine XI.
Yiğitcan Elmalı	Prince Bayezid	Mehmed II's son.
Oğuz Oktay	Osman I	The founder of Ottoman Empire, Mehmed's forefather. In this film, he is depicted to appear before Mehmed in Mehmed's dream. Osman tells Mehmed that he is the conqueror mentioned by Muhammad.
Tuncay Gençkalan	Abu Ayyub al-Ansari	One of Muhammad's sahaba depicted to retell Muhammad's word about the capture of Constantinople by a blessed army and commander. In his later life, he joins a Muslim army to conquer Constantinople in 670s, but he dies in Constantinople and is buried there.
Yılmaz Babatürk	Ishak Pasha	An Ottoman general.
Halis Bayraktaroğlu	Kurtçu Doğan	Leader of the Janissary.
Songül Kaya	Lady Emine	Halil Pasha's wife.
Lili Rich	Dancer	Dinner table dancer.
Hüseyin Özay	Ali the Blacksmith	Hasan's teacher.
Buminhan Dedecan	Mustafa	An Ottoman tunnel master.
Emrah Özdemir	Selim	An Ottoman tunnel foreman.
Yiğit Yarar	Hüseyin	An Ottoman soldier.
Lili Rich	Dancer	Dinner table dancer.
Hüseyin Bozdemir	Mahmud	Orban's assistant.

== Production ==
The production costs of the film are not well-known. The film was produced over a period of three years and cost an estimated $17 million. Other sources claim that the actual cost of the film is US$8 million. A Turkish journalist Ali Eyuboglu asked budget to producer and producer claimed that they never stated any budget to press. In addition to this, another co-producer commented to Ali Eyuboglu that 4 million ticket will be afford expenses for the film. In Turkey profit to producer is estimated $2 per ticket, so the film should cost no more than $8 million. It is still the most expensive film in Turkish cinema history. The film trailer itself took one and a half months to complete and cost $600,000. The trailer was viewed by over 1.5 million people within 24 hours of its release. The size of the full cast was extensive; the film reportedly required the use of 16,000 extras.

== Release ==
Fetih 1453 was released on 15 February 2012 at 14:53 local time. The film was released in different countries on 16 February 2012, including United States, the United Kingdom, France, Egypt, United Arab Emirates, Bosnia-Herzegovina, Kazakhstan, Uzbekistan, Germany, the Netherlands, Macedonia, Kyrgyzstan, Azerbaijan, Tajikistan, Bangladesh, South Korea, Japan and several others. Universal Studios have expressed an interest in acquiring the distribution rights to the film. The film was released on Blu-ray October 2, 2012.

Prior to its release, the film caused outrage in Greece, with many accusing it of being racist and obscuring historical facts, while the Greek Proto Thema newspaper called it "a conquest propaganda by the Turks".

== Reception ==
=== Box office ===
It sold 1.4 million tickets on its first weekend and 2.23 million tickets in its first week of release. In 18 days, it surpassed Recep İvedik 2 to become the most watched film ever in Turkey. As of 13 May 2012, it has sold 6,468,777 tickets in Turkish cinemas.

=== Critical reactions ===
Turkish Prime Minister Recep Tayyip Erdoğan, who watched a special advance screening, liked the film very much.

== Historical accuracy ==
The film only depicts the ethnically Turkish element of the Ottoman army. In reality, the Ottoman army was very diverse, including many Balkan converts to Islam as well as Christian levies and the armies of the Sultan's Christian and Muslim vassals. The Ottoman Empire also engaged in a series of conquests in the previous decade, subjugating the Serbian Despotate and defeating Hungary at the Battle of Varna. The Eastern Roman Empire by 1450 was a shadow of its former self, having shrunk to a few square kilometers outside of Constantinople itself. The city was impoverished and depopulated, and by 1453 consisted of a series of walled villages separated by vast fields surrounded by the 1000 year old Theodosian walls. Eastern Roman Emperor Constantine XI rejected Ottoman overtures to surrender, fearing a massacre by Turkish forces. The final capture of the city also omits the day of pillaging that Mehmed allowed his soldiers, with Mehmed simply sparing the inhabitants instead.

== See also ==
- List of Islamic films
- Fall of Constantinople
- Mehmed the Conqueror
- Turkish nationalism
- Maslaha
- Al-Siyasa al-Shar'iyya fi Islah al-Ra'i wa al-Ra'iyya
