= Kara Para Aşk =

2014 Turkish television drama series

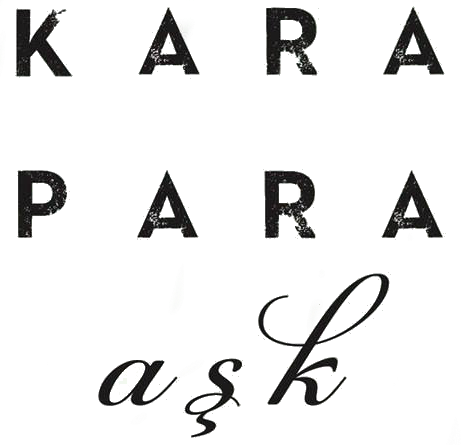
- Genre: Action; Mystery; Romance; Drama
- Written by: Eylem Canbolat; Sema Ergenekon
- Directed by: Ahmet Katıksız
- Starring: Tuba Büyüküstün; Engin Akyürek; Nebahat Çehre; Erkan Can; Hazal Türesan
- Theme music composer: Toygar Işıklı
- Country of origin: Turkey
- Original language: Turkish
- No. of seasons: 2
- No. of episodes: 54

Production
- Producer: Kerem Çatay
- Production locations: Istanbul, Turkey; Rome, Italy
- Running time: 120 minutes

Original release
- Network: ATV (Turkey)
- Release: 12 March 2014 – 15 July 2015

Kara Para Aşk (English: Black Money Love) is a Turkish television series broadcast on ATV screens on Wednesday evenings. The leading cast are Tuba Büyüküstün, Engin Akyürek and Erkan Can. The production of the series is undertaken by Ay Yapım, produced by Kerem Çatay, and directed by Ahmet Katıksız. The show is divided into 54 long Turkish episodes and 164 short international episodes. The first episode of the series aired on Wednesday, 12 March 2014, and concluded on Wednesday, 15 July 2015. With gaining significant viewer ratings, it was one of the most popular and most watched television dramas by that time.

== Synopsis ==
Ömer Demir (Engin Akyürek) is a dedicated and successful detective who lives a moderate life with his small family, and he is soon to be married to his fiancé Sibel Andaç who is a teacher. Ömer's older brother Hüseyin Demir also works as a detective alongside Ömer's two best friends, Arda Çakir and Pelin Serter. On the other hand, Elif Denizer (Tuba Büyüküstün) is a young, free-spirited, and accomplished artist who designs jewelry and lives in Rome, Italy. Elif is the daughter of the famous and wealthy businessman Ahmed Denizer who owns “Denizer Holdings” and his wife Zerrin Denizer, she has a younger sister named Nilüfer and an older sister named Aslı. Elif returns to Istanbul, Turkey to celebrate her 31st birthday with her family and friends, and she's thrown a surprise birthday party by her father, who leaves the party early claiming he has important business to attend to. On the night of Elif's birthday, Ömer drives Sibel home after going on a movie date, and then he heads to the police station to spend time with his friends. Shortly after, a call is made to the police station about two people who got murdered in a car on top of a hill, a man in his fifties and a woman in her thirties. Ömer accompanies his friends and goes to the crime scene, and his life is forever changed. Sibel is found in the passenger seat next to an older man, both shot in the head, and the man's identity is soon revealed to be Ahmed Denizer; Elif's father.

When Elif goes to the police station to give them her statement about the murder, a quarrel breaks out between her and Ömer as she claims that Sibel was probably after her dad's money. Both Elif and Ömer are trying to figure out what type of relationship Ahmed and Sibel have, and why they were killed. Ömer is certain that Sibel did not have a romantic relationship with Ahmed and believes that there is something strange behind this murder, and he continues investigating the case. Ömer finds a piece of diamond in Sibel's room, and he finds another piece of diamond in the car where the murder took place. Meanwhile, Elif and Nilüfer get kidnapped by mafia members. Nilüfer is taken hostage, and Elif is threatened to find and bring the diamonds her father supposedly stole if she wants to save her younger sister. After Elif is released, she runs into Ömer, and he suspects that something is wrong from the frightened look on her face. Elif has also been threatened not to tell anyone about the situation, and she tells Ömer to leave her alone, but Omer shows her the diamonds he found. At the same time, Elif gets a phone call from one of the mafia members, and they ask her who she is standing with and talking to. Elif lies and says he's her boyfriend, but they don't believe her. In order to prove it, she grabs Ömer and kisses him, and now Ömer is convinced that something is wrong and starts following Elif to understand what's going on. Eventually, Elif tells Ömer everything, and they start working together to save Nilüfer and unravel the truth behind the mysterious murder and its connection to the diamonds.

== Cast ==
=== Main characters ===
Actress/Actor	Character	Role
Engin Akyürek	Ömer Demir	The lead male protagonist, and Elif's love interest and future husband.
Tuba Büyüküstün	Elif Denizer	The lead female protagonist, and Ömer's love interest and future wife.
Erkan Can	Tayyar Dündar	The main antagonist, Mert and Fatih's father, and Ahmed's bestfriend.
Burak Tamdoğan	Hüseyin Demir	Ömer's brother and father figure.
Saygın Soysal	Fatih Dündar (Metin)	Tayyar's (secret) son and right-hand man, and Nilüfer's love interest.
Bestemsu Özdemir	Nilüfer Denizer	Elif's younger sister, and Fatih's love interest.
İlkin Tüfekçi	Pelin Şener	Ömer's detective friend, and Arda's future wife.
Ahmet Tansu Taşanlar	Arda Solak	Ömer's childhood best friend who's also a detective, and Pelin's future husband
Hazal Türesan	Aslı Denizer	Elif's older sister, and Can's mother.
Güler Ökten	Elvan Demir	A widow and head of the Demir family, and Ömer and Hüseyin's mother
Ali Yörenç	Mert Dündar	Tayyar's son, and Nilüfer's ex-boyfriend.
Elif İnci	Melike Demir	Hüseyin's wife.
Işıl Yücesoy	Nedret Denizer	The future female antagonist, Elif's aunt, and Ahmed's sister.

=== Supporting ===
Actress/Actor	Character	Role
Tuvana Türkay	Bahar Çınar	Elif's (fake) best friend, and Levent's girlfriend.
Emre Kızılırmak	Levent İnanç	Bahar's boyfriend, and Elif's admirer.
Nebahat Çehre	Zerrin Denizer	Ahmed's wife, and Elif's mother.
Aytaç Arman	Ahmet Denizer	Zerrin's husband, and Elif's father.
Selin Ortaçlı	Sibel Andaç	Ömer's fiancé, and Ahmed's partner in crime.
Serkan Kuru	Taner Akçalı	Aslı's current husband, and Pınar's love interest.
Deniz Barut	Pınar	Tayyar's girlfriend, and Taner's mistress.
Öykü Karayel	İpek	A detective, and Ömer's ex-girlfriend.
Alper Türedi	Ali Amir	The Colonel of the firm where Ömer works.
Damla Colbay	Demet Demir	Hüseyin and Melike's daughter.
Bedia Ener	Fatma Andaç	Sibel's mother.
Dilek Serbest	Svetlana (Sevim)	Hüseyin's secret second wife.
Kerimhan Duman	Can	Aslı's son from her first marriage.

== Broadcast schedule ==
Season no.	Screening day and time	Season start	Season finale	Release year	Number of episodes captured	Division range	Channel
1. Season	Wednesday 20.00	12 March 2014	18 June 2014	2014	13	1-13	atv
2. Season	Wednesday 20.00	3 September 2014	15 July 2015 (finale)	2014-2015	41	14-54	atv

== Production ==
=== Filming ===
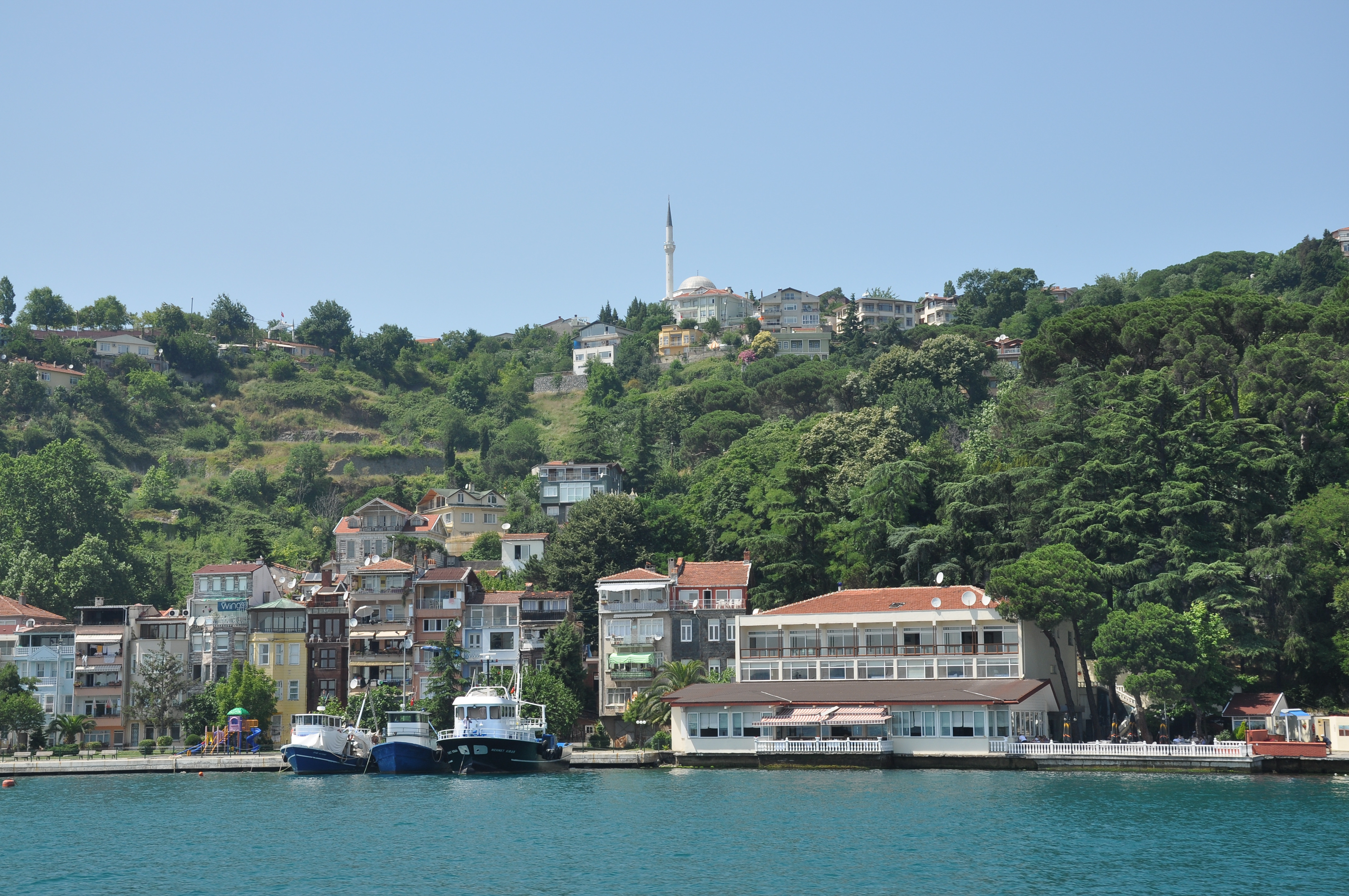
Sarıyer town in Istanbul, Turkey

The series was filmed in Istanbul, Turkey. However, some of the episodes in the show were shot in Rome, Italy. Ömer and Elif's house is located on the European side of Istanbul in a district called Sarıyer. Episode 164, which is the final episode in the series, was filmed in the small fishing town of Gölyazı in Lake Uluabat. The Gölyazı Old Mosque, which is visible in some scenes, is a UNESCO World Heritage Site.

=== Music ===
The original soundtrack of the series was composed and produced by Toygar Işıklı. The soundtrack contains 36 songs which can be listened to on Spotify and other streaming services. One of the most popular songs in the album which was played in multiple episodes is titled Bırak Sende Kaybolayim. Işıklı is also known for his work in the famous Turkish series Çukur and Medcezir where he won the Golden Butterfly Award in the category for "Best Music for TV Series."

== Critical reviews ==
The television series Kara Para Aşk received an overall positive review from critics worldwide. On IMDb, the show received a weighted average rating vote of 7.5/10 based on 6,275 reviews with 42.3% of total votes receiving a 10-star rating and the median being 9-stars. In addition, US critics rated the show a 7.6/10 and non-US critics rated the show a 7.1/10. On Google, the audience gave the show a rating of 4.7/5 based on 1,200 reviews, and 87% of google users who visited the Kara Para Aşk google page liked the show.

== Awards ==
Year	Category	Nominee(s)	Result
TV series Awards 2014	Best Drama Series	Kara Para Aşk	Won
TV series Awards 2014	Best Actor	Engin Akyürek	Won
TV series Awards 2014	Best Actress	Tuba Büyüküstün	Won
TV series Awards 2014	Best Supporting Actress	İlkin Tüfekçi	Won
RaniniTv choose the best actor and actress of 2014	Best Drama Actually	Engin Akyürek	Won
RaniniTv best of 2014	Best music of the series	Kara Para Aşk	Won
Radio and Television Journalists Association (RTGD) "Media Academy Awards"	Best Series Of The Year 2014	Kara Para Aşk	Won
Radio and Television Journalists Association (RTGD) "Media Academy Awards"	Best Actress Of The Year 2014	Tuba Büyüküstün	Won
Award Ceremony of Exporting Council	The First 3 Productions of The export (other countries ) of Turkish series	Kara Para Aşk	Won
Turkey Electrical Electronics and Service Exporters Association Cultural Service Awards	Stars of the Export	Tuba Büyüküstün	Won
Turkey Electrical Electronics and Service Exporters Association Cultural Service Awards	Stars of the Export	Engin Akyürek	Won
Festival Marconi Odülleri, organized by Bursa University radio and television branch in Turkey	Best Actress Of The Year 2015	Tuba Büyüküstün	Won
Festival Marconi Odülleri, organized by Bursa University radio and television branch in Turkey	Best Actor Of The Year 2015	Engin Akyürek	Won
Festival Marconi Odülleri, organized by Bursa University radio and television branch in Turkey	Best Supporting Actor category 2015	Erkan Can	Won
TV series Awards 2015	Best Actor	Engin Akyürek	Won
TV series Awards 2015	Best Actress	Tuba Büyüküstün	Won
TV series Awards 2015	Best Supporting Actress	Bestemsu Özdemir	Won
TV series Awards 2015	Best Supporting Actor	Saygın Soysal	Won
Seoul International Drama Awards 2015	Best Actor Prize	Engin Akyürek	Won
International Emmy Awards 2015	Best Performance by an Actor	Engin Akyürek	Nominated

== International broadcasts ==
Kara Para Aşk has been dubbed in multiple languages. Kara Para Aşk was dubbed in Arabic by Studio Sama Art International and distributed in the Arab World by the Beelink Productions company, aired on MBC Group channels for the first time in the Arab World.

- Afghanistan: Tolo TV
- Albania: TV Klan as Diamante dhe Dashuri (Diamonds and love)
- Algeria: as Ennahar Laki
- Argentina: Telefe
- Bolivia: Red Uno Bolivia
- Bulgaria: TDC
- Chile: Mega as Kara para ask
- Colombia: Caracol TV as Kara para ask
- Dominican Republic: Antena Latina as Amor de contrabando
- Croatia: Nova TV as Ljubav i novac (Love and money)
- Egypt: CBC Egypt as العشق الأسود
- Ethiopia: Kana TV as Tikur Fiker ጥቁር ፍቅር
- Georgia: Maestro TV and Imedi TV as შავი ფული და სიყვარული (shavi fuli da siyvaruli)
- Hungary: Izaura TV as Piszkos pénz, tiszta szerelem (Black money, pure love)
- India: StarPlus as Ghum Hai Kisikey Pyaar Meiin Season 5 (Lost in Someone's Love)
- Indonesia: ANTV and tvOne as Cinta Elif
- Iran: GEM TV and River as Latifeh لطیفه
- Israel: ים תיכוני 25 as אהבה וכסף שחור
- Kuwait: Alrai TV
- Lebanon: MTV Lebanon as العشق الأسود
- Mexico: Imagen TV as Amor y Dinero
- Montenegro: Pink M as Ljubav i novac (Love and money)
- Pakistan: Urdu1 as Kala Paisa Pyar کالا پیسہ پیار
- Peru: Latina Televisión as Kara para ask
- Puerto Rico: WAPA-TV as Kara para ask
- Romania: Pro 2 and Timeless Drama Channel as Dragoste de contrabandă; Netflix as Dragoste și bani murdari
- Serbia: RTV Pink as Ljubav i novac (Love and money)
- Slovenia: POP TV as Usodni diamanti (Fatal Diamonds)
- Somalia: Fanproj as Qarash Iyo Qiimo Jaceyl
- South Africa: eExtra and FOX Life as Black Money Love
- South Korea: CH.U and JNG Korea as 블랙 머니 러브
- Spain: Nova as Amor de contrabando
- United Arab Emirates: MBC 4 and OSN ya hala as العشق الأسود
- United States: MundoMax as Amor de contrabando
- Uzbekistan: MY5 as Pul va gul ishqi
- Ghana: Tv3 Ghana as Black Money Love
