= Dilek Serbest =

Turkish actress and model (born 1981)

- Born: 17 March 1981 (age 45); İzmir, Turkey
- Occupations: Actress; model
- Years active: 2001–present
- Known for: Kara Para Aşk; Fetih 1453; Diriliş: Ertuğrul
- Spouse: Güneş Kazdal (m. 2010)

Dilek Serbest (17 March 1981) is a Turkish actress and former model, best known for her performance in films and TV series like Svetlana, Hüseyin Russian illegal wife in Kara Para Aşk and Izadora in Diriliş: Ertuğrul.

== Biography ==
Dilek was born in Izmir on 17 March 1981. She started as a model and represented various brands such as Roman, Derishow, Arzu Kaprol and Loft. She also appeared in music videos for Teoman, Ege and Levent Yüksel. Serbest made her film debut in the science fiction comedy G.O.R.A in 2003 and acted in the horror film Büyü and Tramvay. In 2012, she played Era in the epic film Fetih 1453.

== Filmography ==
- Yarım Elma (2002)
- G.O.R.A (2003)
- Büyü (2004)
- Kaybolan Yıllar (2006)
- Tramvay (2006)
- Gurbet Yolcuları (2007)
- Dedektif Biraderler (2008)
- Şüphe (2010)
- ’’gümüş
- Fetih 1453 (2012)
- Kara Para Aşk (2014)
- Diriliş: Ertuğrul (2014) (season 1)
- Erkenci Kuş (2019)
