= Church-Mosque of Vefa =

Mosque in Turkey

Church-Mosque of Vefa Vefa Kilise Camii
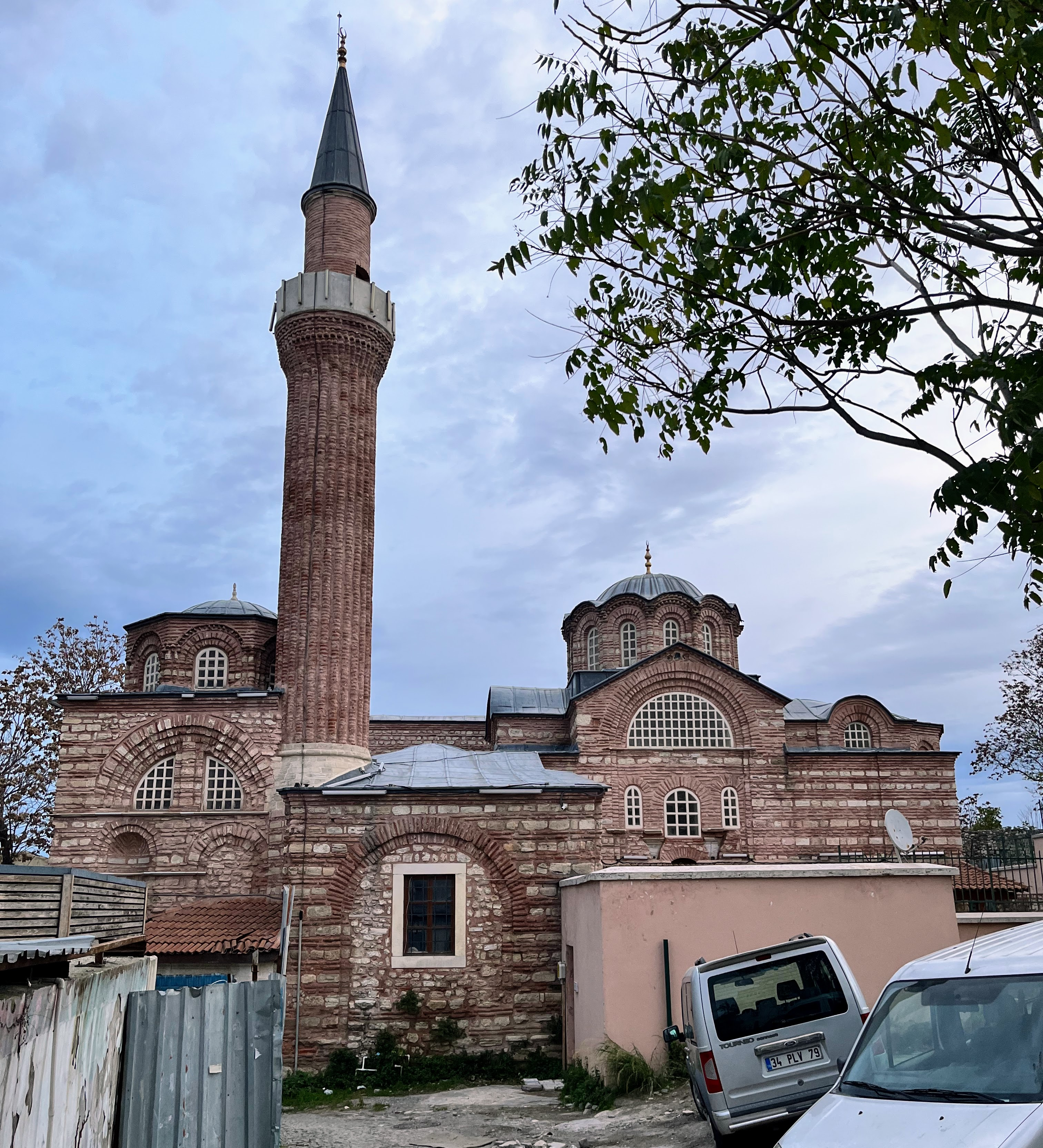
- Molla Gürani Mosque after restoration

- Location in the Fatih district of Istanbul

Religion
- Affiliation: Sunni Islam
- Year consecrated: shortly after 1453

Location
- Location: Istanbul, Turkey
- Coordinates: 41°0′59″N 28°57′37″E

Architecture
- Type: church with cross-in-square plan
- Style: Middle Byzantine - Comnenian
- Completed: 10th - 11th century

Specifications
- Minaret: 1
- Materials: brick, stone

Church-Mosque of Vefa (Turkish: Vefa Kilise Camii, meaning "the church mosque of Vefa", to distinguish it from the other kilise camiler of Istanbul: also known as Molla Gürani Camii after the name of his founder) is a former Eastern Orthodox church converted into a mosque by the Ottomans in Istanbul. The church was possibly dedicated to Hagios Theodoros (St. Theodore, in Greek: Ἅγιος Θεόδωρος ἑν τὰ Καρβουνάρια), but this dedication is far from certain. The complex represents one of the most important examples of Comnenian and Palaiologan architecture of Constantinople.

== Location ==
The building lies in Istanbul, in the district of Fatih, in the neighborhood of Vefa. It is situated less than one kilometer to the northwest of the other great Byzantine building in Vefa (the mosque of Kalenderhane), and a few hundred meters south of the Süleymaniye Mosque.

== History ==
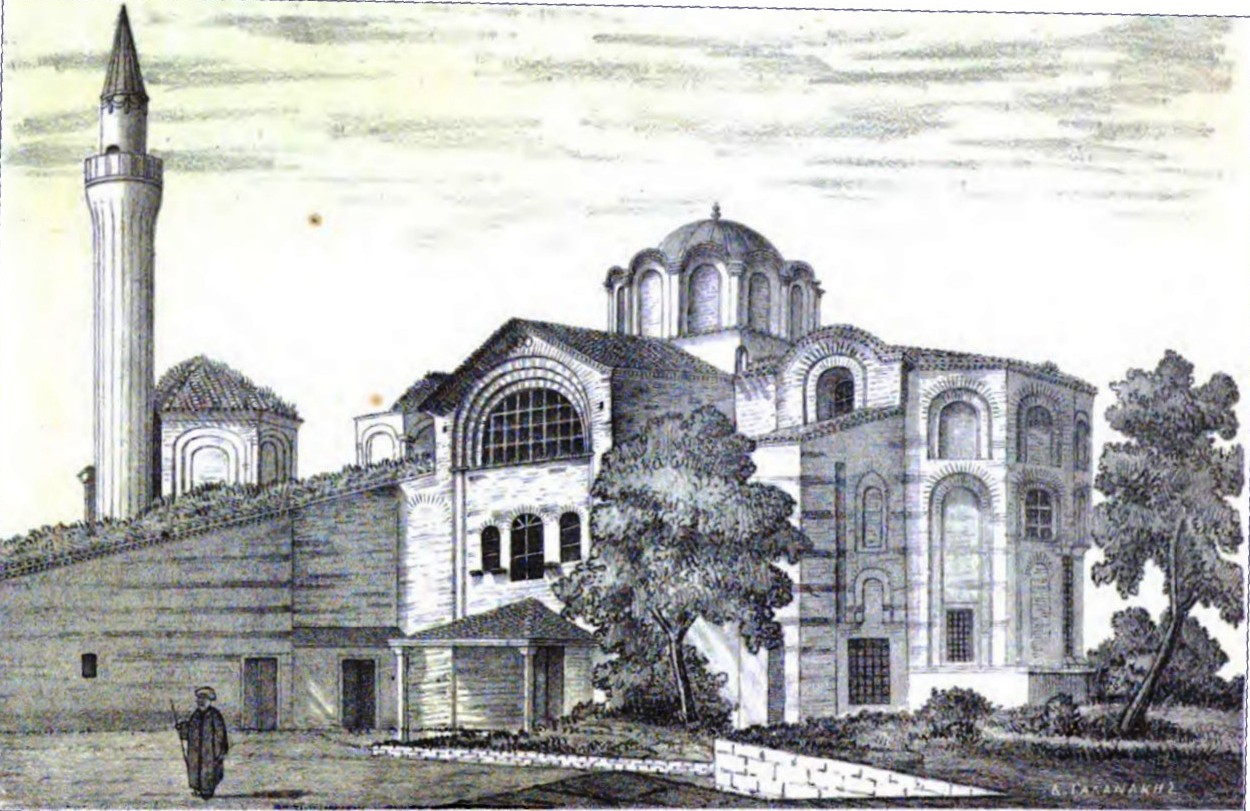
The mosque viewed from the southeast in a drawing of 1877, from A.G. Paspates' Byzantine topographical studies

The origin of the building, which lies on the southern slope of the third hill of Constantinople, is not certain. The dedication to S. Theodore is based upon the identification of the surroundings with the Byzantine neighborhood of ta Karbounaria (the coal market), but this is not sure. On the site, rests of buildings of the 5th century have been found. Judging by its masonry, it was erected in the 10th or the 11th centuries. The dedication to Hagios Theodoros is also far from certain. In the first half of the 14th century a parekklesion was built along the church. During the Latin domination of Constantinople after the Fourth Crusade the edifice was used as a Roman Catholic church.

Shortly after the Ottoman conquest of Constantinople, the church became a mosque, founded by the famous Kurdish scholar Molla Gürâni, who was the tutor of Sultan Mehmed II and would become Şeyhülislam and the first Mufti of Istanbul. The mosque is also named after him. In the 19th century the mosque was badly damaged, possibly by the fire which in 1833 ravaged the surrounding quarter. In 1848 the complex was restored: in that occasion the mosaics which adorned the building were largely destroyed. It is also possible that at the same time the parekklesion was pulled down, and the four columns at the center of the church were substituted with pillars. In 1937, the building underwent a partial restoration, and its surviving mosaics were uncovered and cleaned. Another restoration started in 2017 and was finished in 2021.

== Architecture and decoration ==
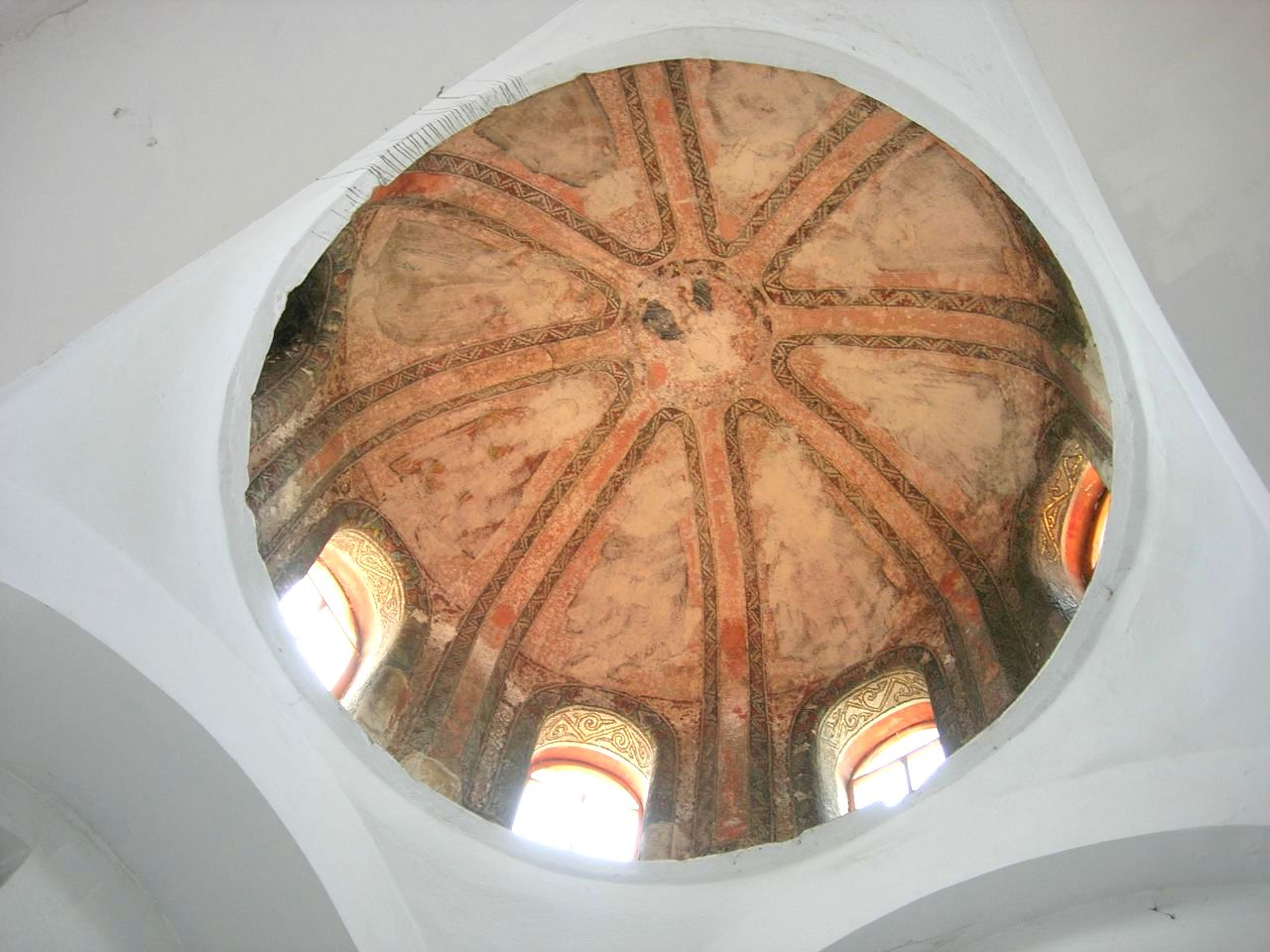
The south dome of the exonarthex with the partially covered mosaics.

The church proper, which has never been studied systematically, has a cross-in-square (or quincunx) plan, with each side nine meters long. Together with the Eski Imaret Mosque, provides an example of the Komnenian style in Constantinople. Its masonry consists of bricks, mounted adopting the technique of the recessed brick, typical of the Byzantine architecture of the middle period. In this technique, alternate courses of brick are mounted behind the line of the wall, and are plunged into a mortar bed. Due to that, the thickness of the mortar layers is about three times greater than that of the brick layers.

The building has blind arcades, and the apse is interrupted by a triple lancet window with niches over it. The light penetrates into the cross arms through triple arcades. The exterior of the main church has occasional decorative motifs, such as snake patterns.

Besides this building, the complex contains also an exonarthex to the west, a portico (which joins a parekklesion with the bema) with columns and arches to the south, and finally a corridor to the north.

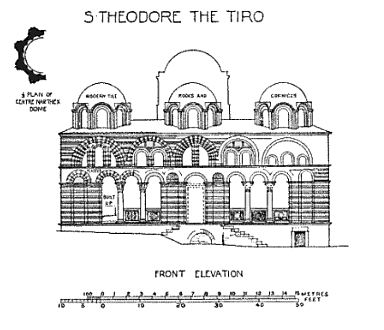
The Exonarthex's façade in a drawing of Alexander Van Millingen (Byzantine Churches of Constantinople, 1912)

The exonarthex represents one of the most typical examples of Palaiologan architecture in Constantinople, along with the parekklesia of the Pammakaristos, the Chora Churches, and Fethiye Mosque. The date of its edification should be placed after those of the parekklesia of the Pammakaristos and Chora Churches. Its façade has two orders, both opened with arcades. On the lower order there are angular niches followed by triple arcades. The higher order is quite different from the lower, and has five semicircular blind arcades framing windows. The masonry is made of banded and colorful brickwork and stonework, especially visible on the north side. Overall, the execution is less refined than in the parekklesion of the Fethiye Mosque.

The exonarthex is surmounted by three domes. The lateral ones are of umbrella type, while the central one has ribs. The internal decoration of the exonarthex includes: columns, capitals and closure slabs which are all reused material from the Early Byzantine period. The three domes were all covered with mosaics. Those on the south and the central domes were cleaned in 1937 under the direction of M. I. Nomides and the Ministry of Mosques, but as of 2007 they have disappeared almost completely. They represent respectively the Virgin Theotokos surrounded by prophets and two imperial officers with prophets. The interior of the church proper, on the contrary, has never been de-plastered up to now.

Two fairly large underground cisterns placed to the S and W of the church hint to the existence of a monastery in the Byzantine age.

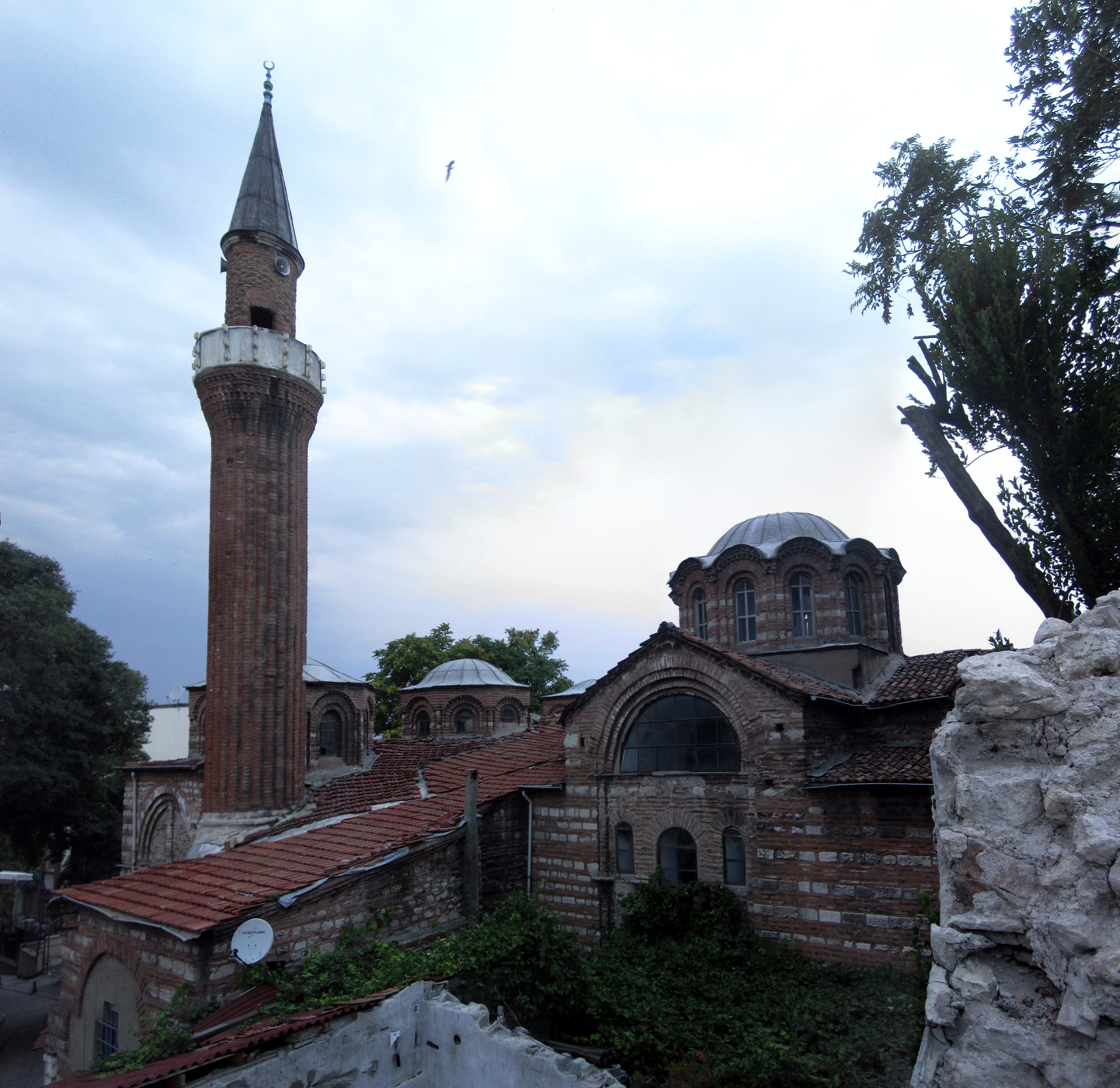
the Molla Gürani Mosque before restoration, The mosque (right) and the exonarthex (left) viewed from the south.

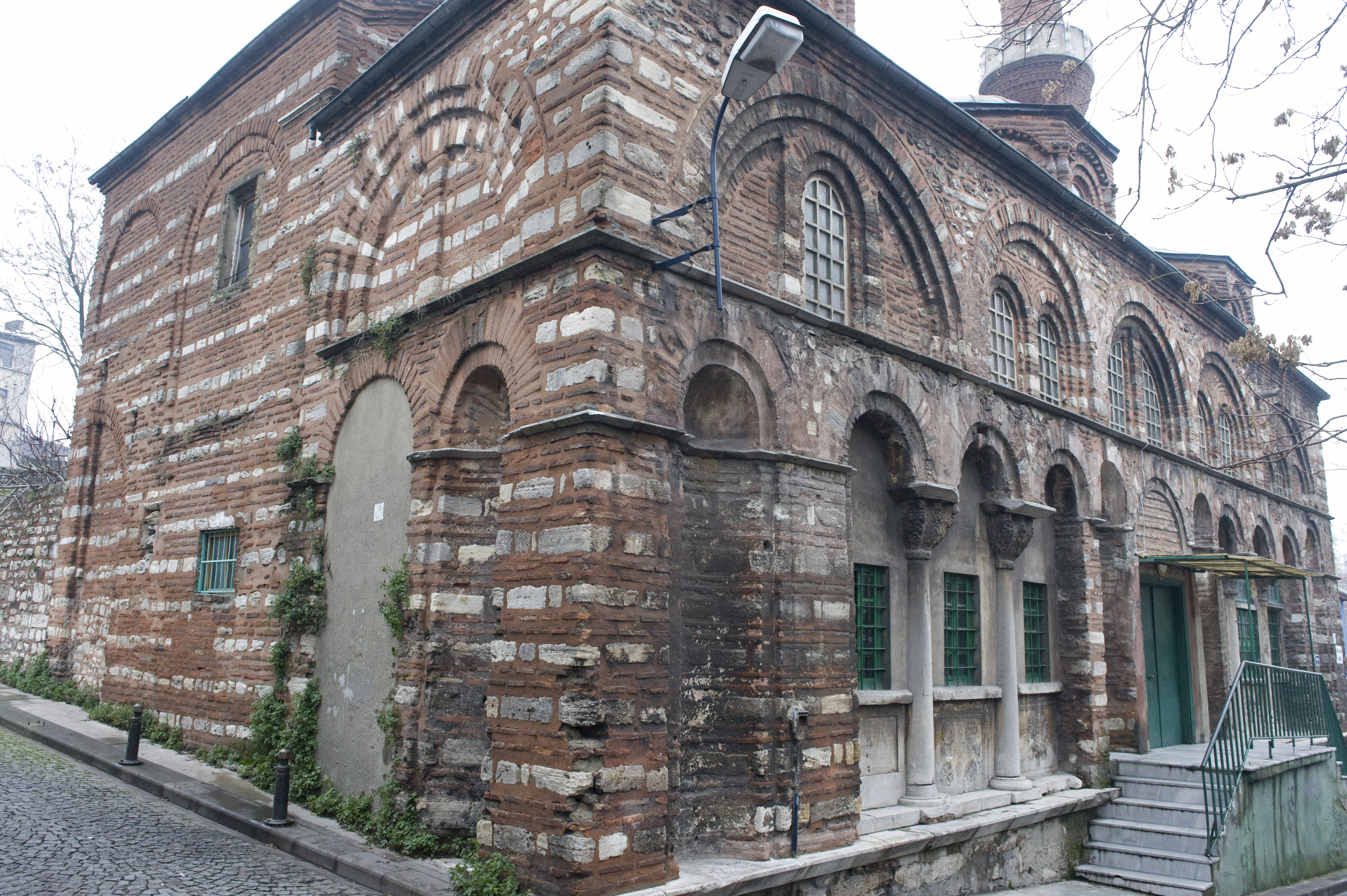
Molla Gurani facade from left corner

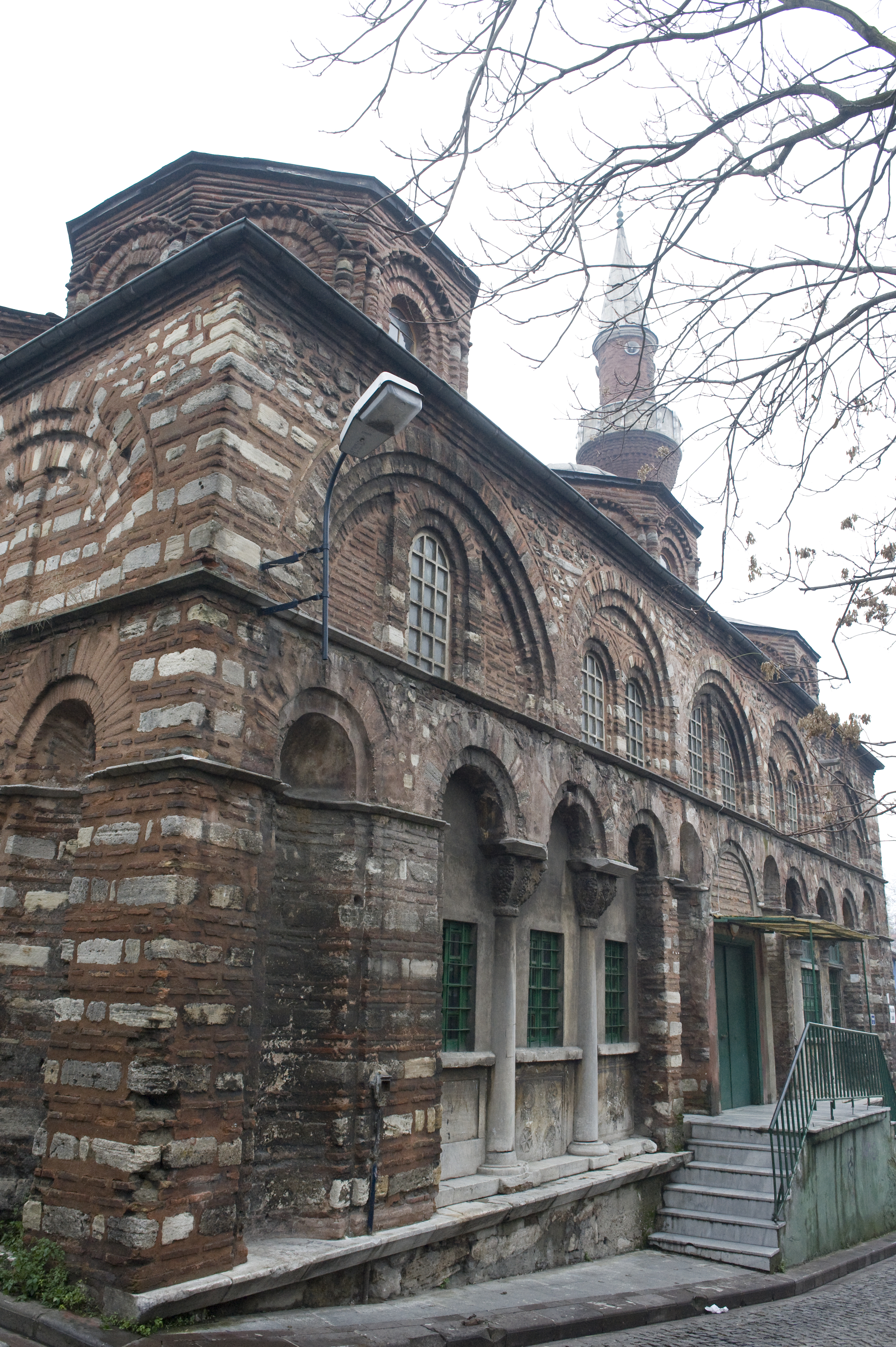
Molla Gurani facade from left corner

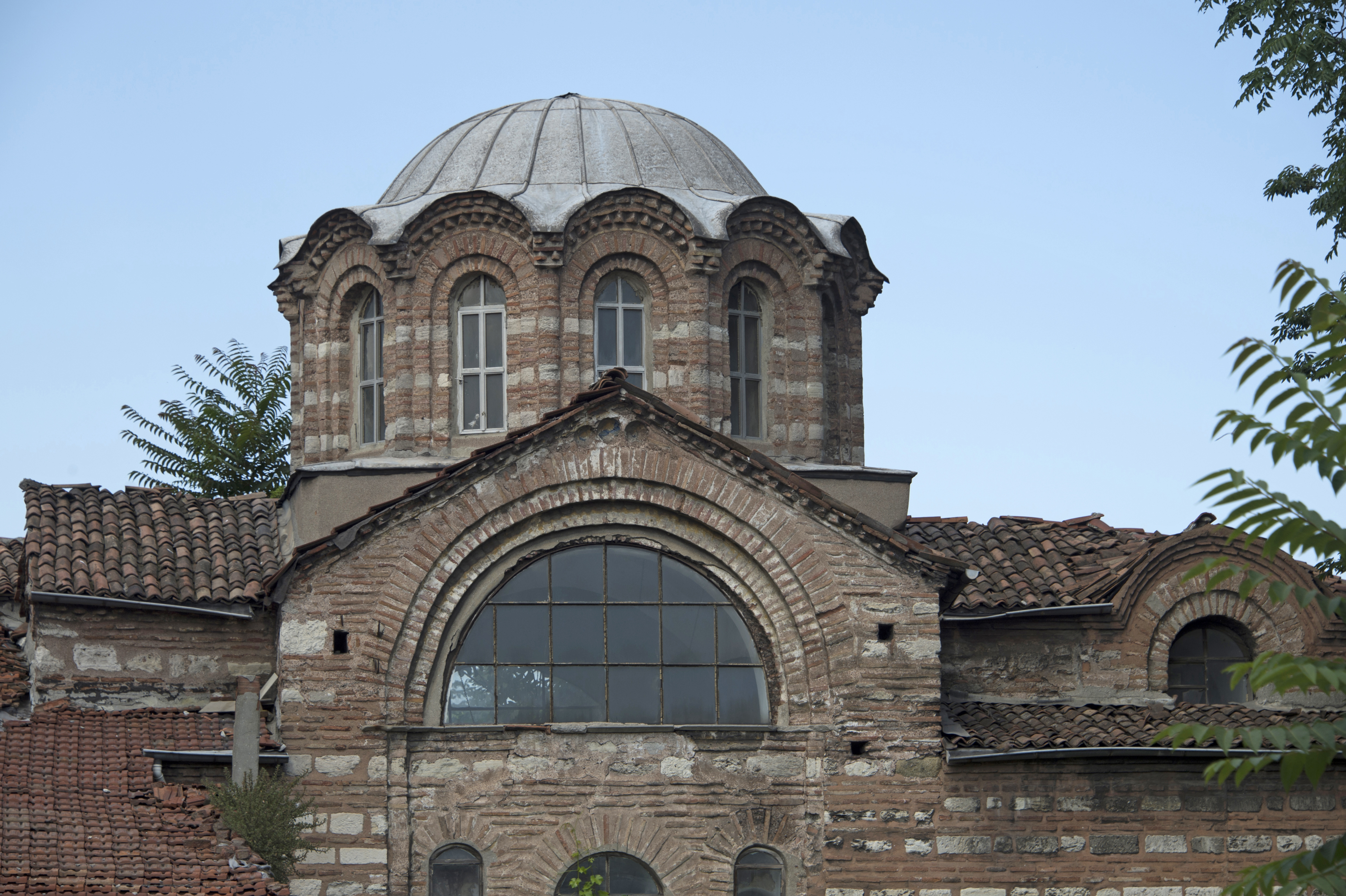
Molla Gurani dome

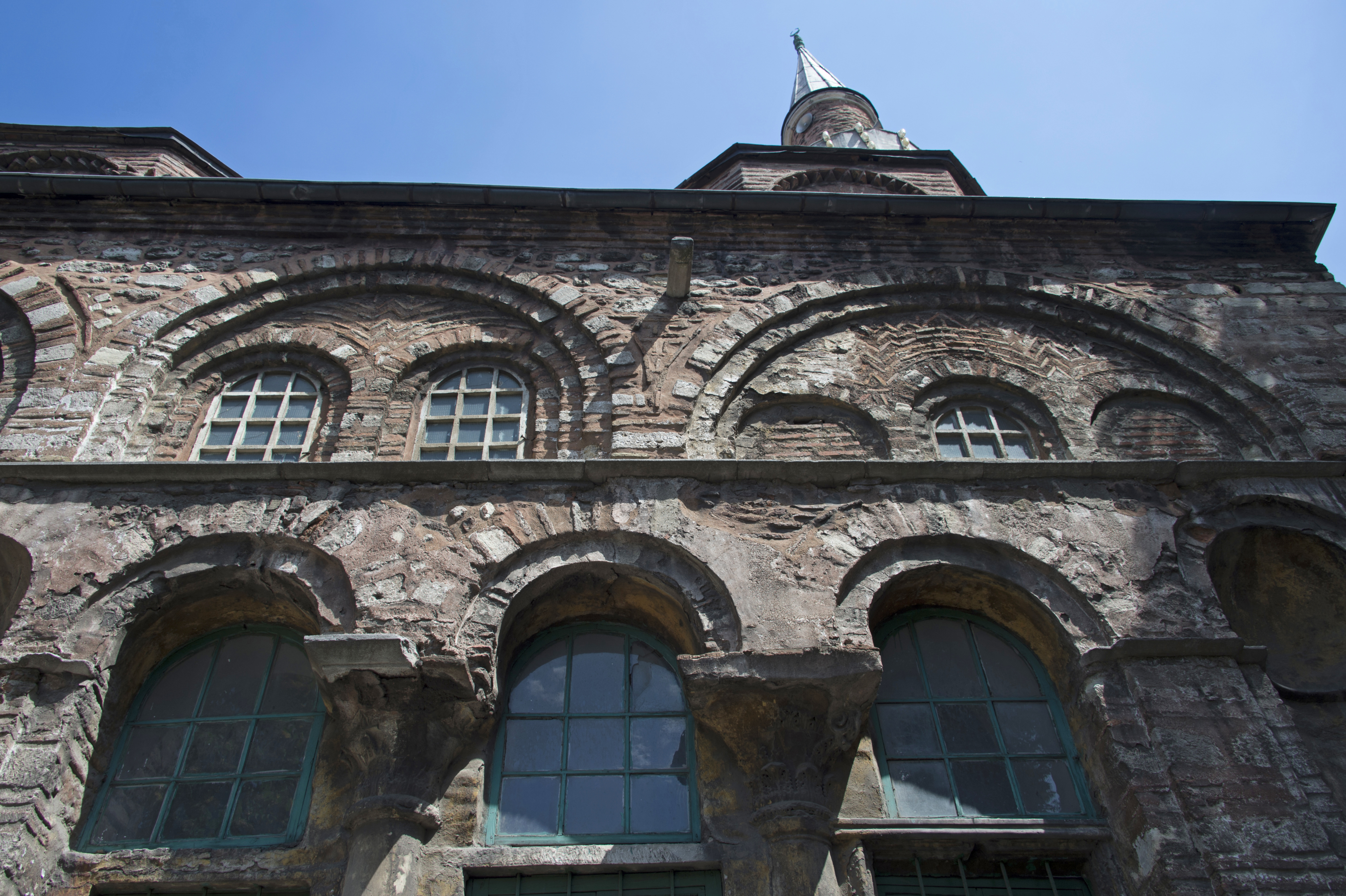
Molla Gurani facade detail

== Sources ==
- Van Millingen, Alexander (1912). Byzantine Churches of Constantinople. London: MacMillan & Co.
- Janin, Raymond (1953). La Géographie Ecclésiastique de l'Empire Byzantin. 1. Part: Le Siège de Constantinople et le Patriarcat Oecuménique. 3rd Vol. : Les Églises et les Monastères (in French). Paris: Institut Français d'Etudes Byzantines.
- Mamboury, Ernest (1953). The Tourists' Istanbul. Istanbul: Çituri Biraderler Basımevi.
- Janin, Raymond (1964). Constantinople Byzantine (in French) (2 ed.). Paris: Institut Français d'Etudes Byzantines.
- Gülersoy, Çelik (1976). A guide to Istanbul. Istanbul: Istanbul Kitaplığı. OCLC 3849706.
- Mathews, Thomas F. (1976). The Byzantine Churches of Istanbul: A Photographic Survey. University Park: Pennsylvania State University Press. ISBN 0-271-01210-2.
- Müller-Wiener, Wolfgang (1977). Bildlexikon Zur Topographie Istanbuls: Byzantion, Konstantinupolis, Istanbul Bis Zum Beginn D. 17 Jh (in German). Tübingen: Wasmuth. ISBN 978-3-8030-1022-3.
- Krautheimer, Richard (1986). Architettura paleocristiana e bizantina (in Italian). Turin: Einaudi. ISBN 88-06-59261-0.
