= Şafak Bakkalbaşıoğlu =

Turkish TV and film director and producer

- Born: Halil Şafak Bakkalbaşıoğlu; 29 May 1964 (age 60); Istanbul, Turkey
- Years active: 1983–present
- Spouse: Deniz Barut (m. 2005; div. 2019)
- Awards: Golden Butterfly; Televizyon Çocuğu - TV Guy - 1996; Magazine Journalists Association; Televizyon Çocuğu - TV Guy - 1996; Golden Butterfly; Yetenek Sizsiniz Türkiye - 2009

Halil Şafak Bakkalbaşıoğlu (born 29 May 1964) is a Turkish television director, television producer, documentary producer and film director.

== Career ==
In 1985 Bakkalbaşıoğlu graduated from the Department of Radio and TV at Ankara University's Faculty of Communications and Media. During the second year of the course he started to work at Turkish Radio and Television Institution (TRT). Beginning as a scriptwriter, Bakkalbaşıoğlu continued his career as a director and producer until 1992. During this period at TRT, he produced programs including Lafı Güzaf (Verbiage in English), a dramatic documentary; Edebiyat Üçlemesi (Literature Trilogy), a dramatic documentary; Prensesin Böylesi (That Kind of a Princess), a drama; and Ondan Sonra (After That), a magazine program.

Bakkalbaşıoğlu transferred to ATV in 1992 until 1997 and produced several broadcasts during this time, including A Takımı, Televizyon Çocuğu, Zaga and Siyaset Meydanı. He is a founding member of Guild of TV and Cinema Producers (TESİYAP). His productions featured many actors who later became stars.

Bakkalbaşıoğlu served as the Executive Broadcasting Director of Star TV, Executive Broadcasting Director of MTV Turkey and Visual Arts Director of Bloomberg HT between 2004 – 2009. He produced programmes in several TV formats – both local and international – including one-night specials, documentaries, and video clips.

After releasing the documentaries Mahzuni Şerif (2005) and Türkiye’nin Ruhu: Cemil Meriç (2008), his documentary İnkılap ve Dokuz Kardeş (İnkılap and Her Nine Sisters) was screened at the 28th International Istanbul Film Festival and was well received. Recently, he was the General Coordinator of the Sanayi Savaşları (Industry Wars) documentary, broadcast on TRT Documentary.

Bakkalbaşıoğlu directed the Jean-Michel Jarre Tour 2010 İstanbul Concert, Cirque Du Soleil İstanbul, and the 2010 FIBA World Championship Grand Opening Night, and is continuing his work with BBO Productions, as well as the Visual Arts Director and Project Consultant to Red Arrow Turkey – Karga Seven Pictures.

In addition to lecturing at Bahcesehir University between 2006 and 2012, Bakkalbaşıoğlu was a lecturer at Istanbul Bilgi University since 2002.

== TV shows ==
Name	Channel	Format	Year(s)
Kum Saat - Sand Watch	Star TV	Talk Show - News	1997
A Takımı - A Team	ATV	News	1992 - 1995
Festivalde Dün, Bugün, Yarın - Yesterday, Today and Tomorrow at Festival	TRT	News	1990
Prensesin Böylesi - This is the Princess	TRT	Drama	1991
Ondan Sonra - After That	TRT	Magazine	1992
Televizyon Çocuğu - TV Guy	ATV	Talk Show	1996
Cumartesi Gecesi Ateşi - Saturday Night Fire	Star TV	Show	1997
Maç Arası - Half Time	TRT	Sports - Magazine	1998
Zaga - Zaga	Kanal D	Talk Show	1998 - 2001
Murat Şov - Murat Show	BRT	Talk Show	1999 - 2000
Star Yılbaşı - Star New Years Night	Star TV	Show	2000
Herşey Yolunda - Everything is All right	Star TV	Show	2000
Ağırlığınca Altın - Win Your Weight in Gold	ATV	Contest	2000
Yirmibir - Twenty One	Star TV	Game Show	2000
Olivium Fırsatlar Merkezi - Olivium Opportunities Center	Star TV	Contest	2000
Sayısal Gece - Lottery Night	TRT	Show	2002
Kaymaklı Ekmek Kadayıfı - Creamy Bread	Show TV	Show	2002
Bekarlar - Singles	Show TV	Series	2003
Türkiye'nin Yıldızları - Stars of Turkey	Show TV	Contest	2004 - 2006
30 Saniyede Şöhret - Famous in 30 seconds	Star TV	Contest	2004
Sen Olsaydın - If	Show TV	Reality Show	2004
Yalnız Değilsin - You're not Alone	ATV	Reality Show	2005
Kadınlar ve Erkekler - Women and Men	Kanal D	Contest	2006
Yüzleşme - Judas Game	Star TV	Contest	2006
Zanzara	Star TV	Comedy	2006
Metin Akpınar ile Muhabbet - Chat hosted by Metin Akpınar	Kanal 1	Talk Show	2006
Stüdyo 4 - Studio 4	Star TV	Talk Show	2006
Savaş Ay'la Tozlu Yollar - Dusty Ways by Savaş Ay	ATV	News - Documentary	2007
Ünlüler Sirki - Fame	Star TV	Contest	2007
Çapraz Ateş - Cross Fire	FOX	News - Panel	2007
Benim Param Senin Paran - Win My Wage	Star TV	Contest	2007 - 2008
Reha Muhtar'la Bu Kimin Hikayesi - Whose Story by Reha Muhtar	Kanal 1	Contest	2008
Kolay Gelsin - Easy Come	Kanal 1	Sitcom	2008
5 Kere 5 - 5 Times 5	NTV	Lifestyle	2009
Uyanık Bar - Wake Up Bar	FOX	Comedy Show	2009
Yetenek Sizsiniz Türkiye - Turkey's Got Talent	Show TV	Talent Show	2009 - 2010
Kral TV Müzik Ödülleri - Kral TV Music Awards	Kral TV	Award Ceremony	2010
Giants Live İstanbul	Eurosport - CNN Türk	Contest	2010
0 km	Kral TV	Music	2010 - 2011
Fazla Mesai - Overtime	NTV	Talk Show	2011
Kral TV Müzik Ödülleri - Kral TV Musıc Awards	Kral TV	Award Ceremony	2011
Artiz Mektebi - School of Fame	Kanal D	Contest	2011
Miss Turkey 2012 Daily Camps	Star TV	Contest	2012
Miss Turkey 2012	Star TV	Contest	2012
Kral TV Müzik Ödülleri - Kral TV Music Awards	Kral TV	Award Ceremony	2012
Doktor Tavsiyesi - Doctor's Advice	Eurostar	Health	2012
Affetsen - Forgive	FOX	Reality	2013
Kapanmadan Kazan - Raid the Cage	ATV	Contest	2013
Takip - The Chase	Kanal D	Contest	2014
Piramit - Pyramid	Show TV	Contest	2014
Ver Fırına - Bake Off	TV8	Food - Contest	2014
Sesi Çok Güzel	FOX	Music Contest	2015
Hülya Avşar	TV8	Talk Show	2015
Komedi Türkiye - Comedy Turkey	TV8	Comedy Contest	2015
En Zayıf Halka - The Weakest Ring	TV8	Contest	2015
İlker Ayrık'la Var Mısınız Yok Musunuz - Deal or No Deal by İlker Ayrık	Star TV	Contest	2016
40	CNN Türk - Haber Global - GAİN	News Program	2018 -
Aslı Şafak'la İşin Aslı	Bloomberg HT	Television Program	2019 -
İstanbul Hesabı	GAİN	Online Program	2021 -

== One-night specials ==
Name	Year(s)
Tekofaks - Milliyet Fair Play Awards Night	1998 - 1999
Crystal Apple Advertising Awards	1998 - 1999 - 2000 - 2001 - 2002
Parkorman Opening Night	2001
Doğan Press Holding Creativity Awards	2005 - 2006 - 2007 - 2008
MTV Turkey Lansman Party	2006
Radar Live International Music Festival (Live)	2007
Miss Turkey	2008
2010 Istanbul World Capital Opening Night	2010
Kral TV Music Awards	2010
Ajda Pekkan Open Air FestiVal	2010
Jean Michel Jarre Tour 2010 Concert	2010
2010 FIBA World Championship Turkey Grand Opening Night	2010
2010 FIBA World Championship Cirque du Soleil Special Show	2010
Kral TV Music Awards	2011
Kral TV Music Awards	2012
Miss Turkey	2012
EXPO 2016 Antalya Grand Opening Night	2016

== Advertisements ==
Name	Year(s)
Asgold	1997
Orkid	1998
Bosch Campaign	1999
Milliyet / Roadster Campaign	1999
Rejoice	1999
P&G Campaign	1999
Alo P&G	1999
Vestel - Funkey	2000
Alem FM	2000
Cappy	2000
Milliyet - Metamorphosis	2001
Akşam - KVK Campaign	2001
McDonald's	2001
McDonald's Secret Cam	2001
Valbreso	2001 2002
P&G Beyond White	2002
Poliday Slippers & Sandals Campaign	2003
Poliday Slippers & Sandals	2003
Colgate Campaign - Kadir Çöpdemir	2009

== Promotional films ==
Name	Year(s)
Olympiads Center Opening Film	1995
Habitat City Summit	1996
İş Leasing	1998
İş Bankası	2000
Microsoft	2000
Coca-Cola	2004
Doğan Burda - All Magazines (Doğan is Here)	2005 2006 2007
Metro Gastro Meeting Fair	2005 2006 2007 2008
Metro Cash&Carry	2006
Kipa	2006
Metro Cash&Carry - ISO 22000	2007
Metro Cash&Carry - Veggie Film	2007
Metro Cash&Carry - Meat Film	2007
Metro Cash&Carry	2009
Istanbul Municipality 2009 - 2010 Art & Culture Season Opening Ceremony	2009
Metro Cash&Carry Films	2010 2011

== Documentaries ==
Names	Channel	Year(s)
Türkiyem (My Dear Turkey)	TRT	1988
Türkü Defteri (Song Notebook)	TRT	1989
Laf-ı Güzaf (Verbiage)	TRT	1989
Edebiyat Üçlemesi (Literature Trilogy)	TRT	1990
Yaşayan Şiirimiz (Our Living Poetry)	TRT	1990
Mahzuni Şerif	-	2005
İnkılap ve Dokuz Kardeş (İnkılap and Her Nine Sisters)	İz TV	2008 - 2009
Türkiye'nin Ruhu: Cemil Meriç (Soul of Turkey)	TRT - İz TV - Cine5	2008 - 2009
Sanayi Savaşları (Industry Wars)	TRT	2016

== Music videos ==
Names	Artist	Year(s)
Fırat Türküsü (Eşkıya Film Soundtrack)	Erkan Oğur	1996
Yağmur Yüreklim	Onur Akın	1999
Öteki Elini de Sen Tut	Sezen Aksu	1999
Sevdanın Son Vuruşu	Tarkan	2011
Bal Gibi	Kenan Doğulu	2012

== Awards ==
Year	Name	Award
1984	Tomurcuk (Bud)	Asia – Pacific Press Association, Child and Youth Programs – Honourable Mention (Scriptwriter)
1993	Ondan Sonra (After That)	Simavi Foundation Honorable Production Award in TV (Producer and Director)
1994	A Takımı (A Team)	Turkey Journalists Community – Special Award (Director)
1996	Televizyon Çocuğu (TV Guy)	Golden Butterfly Awards - Best TV Show Award (Director)
1996	Televizyon Çocuğu (TV Guy)	Magazine Journalists Association – Best TV Show Award (Director)
2009	Yetenek Sizsiniz Türkiye (Turkey's Got Talent)	Golden Butterfly Awards - Best Contest in TV Award (Director)
