= Asi (TV series) =

- Genre: Drama, Romance, Telenovela
- Written by: Gül Dirican; Neşe Cehiz; Şebnem Çıtak
- Directed by: Cevdet Mercan
- Starring: Tuba Büyüküstün; Murat Yıldırım; Çetin Tekindor; Nur Sürer; Tuncel Kurtiz; Selma Ergeç; Cemal Hünal; Tülay Günal; Saygın Soysal; Elif Sönmez; Kanbolat Görkem Arslan; Emrah Elçiboga; Menderes Samancilar; Çağla Çakar
- Opening theme: Asi Jenerik
- Ending theme: Yenemedik Gururu by Eylem Aktaş
- Composer: Nail Yurtsever
- Countries of origin: Turkey; North Macedonia
- Original language: Turkish
- No. of seasons: 2
- No. of episodes: 71 (list of episodes)

Production
- Executive producers: Tomris Giritlioğlu; Ilgaz Giritlioğlu
- Producers: Bahadır Atay; Basar Arcak; Nermin Eroğlu
- Production locations: Antakya, Turkey, Ohrid, Macedonia
- Cinematography: Murat Ceylan
- Running time: 90 minutes
- Production company: Sis Yapım

Original release
- Network: Kanal D, Sitel
- Release: July 21, 2007 – June 15, 2009

Asi (Turkish pronunciation: [aːˈsiː]) is a Turkish television drama series. The series originally aired from July 21, 2007, to June 15, 2009. It ran for two seasons on Kanal D.

== Premise ==
The series is set in a rural part of Antakya and revolves around the lives of Asi Kozcuoğlu (Tuba Büyüküstün), and Demir Doğan (Murat Yıldırım), and their respective families.

For three generations, the Kozcuoğlu family owns a prominent plantation in Antakya. Keeping this farm alive is their foremost goal. The owner, Ihsan Kozcuoğlu (Çetin Tekindor), and his daughter, Asi, work and live for their land. Years ago, Demir's mother, Emine (Elif Sümbül Sert), and aunt, Süheyla (Tülay Günal), were workers on the Kozcuoğlu farm until his mother drowned herself with her two kids Demir and Melek in the nearby river called Asi /Orontes (The modern name ‘Asi` means ("rebel"), because the river flows from the south to the north unlike the rest of the rivers in the region.). Her children survived, Demir and Melek, and they went on to live with their aunt Süheyla. Demir returns to his hometown as a rich businessman. Still embittered about the circumstances that drove his mother to her death, he meets Asi and is immediately drawn to her. However, the lives of the Kozcuoğlu family and Demir's family bear more connections from the past that constantly seem to get in between. Family secrets start to unravel after Süheyla returns to be with her nephew Demir. Murder, death, affairs, and a love child is discovered as everyone's life is turned upside down when decade old secrets come to surface. Demir and Asi's love is tested to the limits as they struggle to hold to their affection while their world crumbles around them.

== Episodes ==
Season	Episodes	Originally released	
Season	Episodes	First released	Last released
1	34	October 26, 2007	June 27, 2008
2	37	September 12, 2008	June 19, 2009

== Cast ==
Main cast

- Tuba Büyüküstün as Asiye "Asi" Kozcuoğlu
- Murat Yıldırım as Demir Doğan
- Çetin Tekindor as İhsan Kozcuoğlu
- Nur Sürer as Neriman Kozcuoğlu
- Tuncel Kurtiz as Cemal Ağa
- Selma Ergeç as Defne Kozcuoğlu
- Cemal Hünal as Kerim Akbar
- Tülay Günal as Süheyla
- Saygın Soysal as Aslan Kozcuoğlu
- Elif Sönmez as Melek Doğan
- Kanbolat Görkem Arslan as Ali Uygur
- Emrah Elçiboga as Zafer Şermet
- Menderes Samancilar as Haydar Doğan
- Çağla Çakar as Asya Doğan-Kozcuoğlu

Supporting cast

- Kenan Bal as Namık
- Onur Saylak as Ziya
- Aslıhan Güner as Gonca Kozcuoğlu
- Dilara Deviren / Zeynep Çopur as Ceylan Kozcuoğlu
- Necmettin Çobanoğlu as Ökkeş
- Tülay Bursa as Fatma
- Ayça Zeynep Aydın as Leyla Akbar
- Şahnaz Çakıralp as Sarmaşık
- Setenay Yener as Sevinç
- İbrahim Bozgüney as Arif
- Sibel Kasapoğlu as Young Asi
- İdil Vural as Young Süheyla
- Elif Sude Dorukoğlu as Elif
- Eli Mango as Madam
- Ezgi Çelik as İnci
- Remzi Evren as Mahmut
- Elvin Aydoğdu as Cevriye
- Elif Sümbül Sert as Emine Doğan
- Salahsun Hekimoğlu as Reha
- Murat Çamur as Kaan
- Birce Akalay as Zeynep

== International broadcasting ==
- Georgia on Maestro TV as Asi
- Pakistan on Express Entertainment as Asi (2012-2014)
- Northern Cyprus on Kanal D as Asi
- Turkey on Kanal D as Asi
- Somalia on Horn Cable Television as Caasi
- Serbia on Prva as Asi
- North Macedonia on TV Sitel as Asi
- Kosovo on Kohavision as Asi
- Croatia on Nova TV as Asi
- Slovakia on TV Doma as Perla Orientu
- Greece on ANT1 as Asi
- Bulgaria on Kino Nova as Гордата Аси
- Syria on MBC as "ASI"
- Iran on MBC as "ASI"
- Romania on Kanal D as "Asi — Împotriva destinului"
- Morocco on 2M as "ASI"
- Uzbekistan on Yoshlar TV as "Osiyo"
- Ukraine on 1+1 as "Asi"
