= Bestemsu Özdemir =

Turkish actress (born 1992)

- Born: 20 April 1992 (age 34); Istanbul, Turkey
- Occupation: Actress
- Years active: 2012–present
- Spouse: Ersin Görkem (m. 2025)

Bestemsu Özdemir (born 20 April 1992) is a Turkish actress.

== Early life ==
Bestemsu Özdemir was born on 20 April 1992 in Istanbul, Turkey. She completed her education in Istanbul Technical University at the department of Fashion Design. The actress started modelling during her high school years. Özdemir's parents separated when she was two years old, she lived with her grandparents in Ankara for three years.

== Career ==
Özdemir began her acting career in 2012, she starred in the series Sakarya Fırat and depicted the character of Melike Derbent, which was broadcast on TRT 1. In the same year, she made her debut in the series Araf Zamanı and İstanbul Hatırısı and portrayed the character of Sultan. In 2014, she made her debut in the series Kara Para Aşk and portrayed the character of Nilüfer Denzer. In 2015, she made her debut in the series Analar ve Anneler and portrayed the character of Sevgi. The same year she portrayed the character of Rosa in the movie Tabula Rosa. In 2016, she starred in the movie Biz Size Döneriz and portrayed the character of Defne. The same year, she was starred in the series İçerde. In 2017, she appeared in the movie Dünyanın En Güzel Kokusu 2. In the same year, she starred in Kırlangıç Fırtınası and Meryem and which she depicted the character of Beliz, which was broadcast on Kanal D.

In 2018, she portrayed the character of Fulya in the movie Baba Nerdesin Kayboldum. In the same year, she had a main role in the series Ege'nin Hamsisi and portrayed the character of Zeynep Gerginoğlu. In 2019, she appeared in the series Güvercin and portrayed the character of İpek, which was broadcast on Star TV. In 2020, she made her debut in the series Akrep and depicted the character of Selma.

== Personal life ==
Özdemir dated Turkish actor Can Yaman, however they broke up. In 2019, she started dating lawyer Nail Gönenli, they attended the concert of Oğuzhan Koç. In 2025, she married former basketball player Ersin Görkem.

== Filmography ==
=== Film ===
Year	Title	Role
2015	Tabula Rosa	Rosa / Saadet
2017	Biz Size Döneriz	Defne
2017	Dünyanın En Güzel Kokusu 2	Candan
2018	Baba Nerdesin Kayboldum	Fulya
2021	Milyonda Bir	Rüya
2022	Müjdemi İsterim	
2023	Nefes: Yer Eksi İki	Şebnem
2023	Operation Fortune: Ruse de Guerre	Vivienne

=== Television ===
Year	Title	Role	Notes
2012	İstanbul Hatırası	Sultan	20 episodes
2012	Araf Zamanı		21 episodes
2012-13	Sakarya Fırat	Melike Derbent	38 episodes (Season 4)
2014–15	Kara Para Aşk	Nilüfer Denizer	54 episodes
2015	Analar ve Anneler	Sevgi Tinar	Episode 7
2017–18	Meryem	Beliz Bilen	30 episodes
2018	Ege'nin Hamsisi	Zeynep Gerginoğlu	23 episodes
2020	Güvercin	İpek	9 episodes
2021	Akrep	Selma	8 episodes
2021	İkimizin Sırrı	Ece Kaya	10 episodes
2022	Gecenin Ucunda	Serra Pekdemir	26 episodes
2023	Kirli Sepeti	Yasemin	

=== Music videos ===
Year	Title	Artist	Ref(s)
2014	Haga Mestakhabeya	Mohamed Hamaki	
