= Büyü =

- Film poster
- Directed by: Orhan Oğuz
- Written by: Şafak Güçlü; Servet Aksoy
- Produced by: Faruk Aksoy
- Starring: Ece Uslu; Özgü Namal; İpek Tuzcuoğlu; Okan Yalabık; Nihat İleri; Dilek Serbest; Suna Selen
- Cinematography: Adnan Güler
- Edited by: Özen Film
- Release date: December 17, 2004
- Country: Turkey
- Language: Turkish

Büyü (The Spell) is a 2004 Turkish horror film directed by Orhan Oğuz.

Though the film was a surprise box office success, it received very poor reviews.

== Plot ==
A group of archeologists go into a ghost village that is cursed by its past. They ignore the warnings of the natives, but soon after they arrive, terror strikes. Weird bugs come out of flames to bite Cemil, Ayadan is raped by an invisible force (she awakes from it like a dream), babies are heard crying in the air, and more unnerving incidents occur. After the unexpected murder by decapitation of Cemil, the group finally bands together to try to take on the evil forces lurking around every corner.

== Cast ==
- Ece Uslu - Aydan
- Özgü Namal - Sedef
- İpek Tuzcuoğlu - Ayşe
- Okan Yalabık - Cemil
- Nihat İleri - Professor
- Dilek Serbest - Ceren
- Suna Selen - Büyücü
- Okan Selvi -
- Serhat Tutumluer - Tarık
- Ebru Ürün - Ebru
