= List of Asi episodes =

Asi is a Turkish television drama revolving around the lives of Asi Kozcuoğlu and Demir Doğan in the rural town of Antakya. It ran on Kanal D from October 26, 2007 to June 19, 2009.

== Series overview ==
| Season | Episodes | Originally released | |
| Season | Episodes | First released | Last released |
|---|---|---|---|
| 1 | 34 | October 26, 2007 | June 27, 2008 |
| 2 | 37 | September 12, 2008 | June 19, 2009 |

== Episodes ==
=== Season 1 (2007—2008) ===
| No. overall | No. in season | Title | Directed by | Original release date |
|---|---|---|---|---|
| 1 | 1 | "Demir ile Asi arasındaki çekim giderek artar" | Cevdet Mercan | October 26, 2007 |
Demir Doğan, a businessman from Istanbul, returns to his hometown with his friend Kerim after having left it years ago as a child with his aunt Sühelya and his sister Melek. In Antakya he is reminded of the death of his mother who drowned herself in the river after losing her job. Trying to come to terms with his past, he encounters Asi Kozcuoğlu and is immediately drawn to her. Unfortunately, Asi is the daughter of the man whom Demir holds responsible for his family's tragedy.
| 2 | 2 | "Asi kimin kızı?" | Cevdet Mercan | November 2, 2007 |
Demir finds out that the Kozcuoğlu family, one of the most prominent farming families in the region, allegedly drove his mother to commit suicide. Motivated by revenge and desire to return to his roots he decides to move his business to Antakya and buys the farm of Cemal Ağa, İhsan's father-in-law, in order to learn more about his mother's past.
| 3 | 3 | "Demir'den Asi'ye ilginç teklif" | Cevdet Mercan | November 9, 2007 |
In order to be able to repay his debts, Demir makes İhsan an interesting offer. In the meantime, Kerim and Defne's attraction to each other continually grows.
| 4 | 4 | "Asi, Demir'in çiftliğinde çalışıyor" | Cevdet Mercan | November 16, 2007 |
Demir, who has taken over the mortgage of İhsan's farm, succeeds in getting Asi to work at his farm to pay off her father's debt. Süheyla is not happy about Kerim and Defne's blossoming relationship.
| 5 | 5 | "İhsan, Demir'e nasıl bir tepki verecek?" | Cevdet Mercan | November 23, 2007 |
İhsan is dismayed to learn that his daughter Asi works at Demir's farm. To pay their debts and despite both father and daughter's reluctance, Asi continues to work at Demir's farm.
| 6 | 6 | "Asi, Demir’e ne soracak?" | Cevdet Mercan | November 30, 2007 |
Before Süheyla's husband dies, he tells her that her son, contrary to her belief, did not die in childbirth but is still alive. To find out more, Süheyla decides to stay in Antakya.
| 7 | 7 | "Demir'in Asi'den yeni bir isteği var" | Cevdet Mercan | December 7, 2007 |
Demir opens up to Asi about the past. When Asi learns of his mother's suicide, she is visibly shocked and can understand Demir's previously reluctant behavior. Kerim who is head over heels in love with Defne, wants to show this to the world. This is not as easy as it seems though, since Süheyla is apparently against any matches between her family and the Kozcuoğlus.
| 8 | 8 | "Asi, Demir'i affetmiyor; Demir'in başı büyük dertte" | Cevdet Mercan | December 14, 2007 |
Asi, who accepted Demir's offer to pay off half of her father's debts in return for her beloved horse, is shocked when she learns that her horse has died in an attempt to get back to his old farm. Asi finds it increasingly difficult to work at Demir's farm after the tragic death of her horse. In her grief she stays away from Demir. A long awaited meeting between Süheyla and İhsan takes place, revealing more than one secret and misunderstandings.
| 9 | 9 | "Asi, Demir’in çiftliğini terk ediyor" | Cevdet Mercan | December 28, 2007 |
Asi quits her job at Demir's farm. The Kozcuoğlu family now has to find a quick way to earn some money. Therefore, İhsan takes up an offer from his friend Bulent and immediately receives the money he needs to pay off his debts. Demir, however, is suspicious of Bulent's business ethics and tries to warn İhsan.
| 10 | 10 | "Demir, Asi'yi kaybetmekten korkuyor" | Cevdet Mercan | January 4, 2008 |
Demir fears that he will lose Asi when Kenan, a family relative from Germany, openly shows his interest in her. Kenan even tells İhsan that he is considering marrying Asi, much to Neriman's delight.
| 11 | 11 | "Asi ile Demir’in arası açılıyor" | Cevdet Mercan | January 11, 2008 |
İhsan is arrested while Bulent disappears. Asi holds Demir responsible for her father's arrest. Cemal Ağa, unmoved by the arrest, has other matters on his mind. He begins to suspect that İhsan might be the father of Süheyla's child.
| 12 | 12 | "Asi'yi zor günler bekliyor" | Cevdet Mercan | January 18, 2008 |
Demir tries to find Bulent in order to prove İhsan's innocence while Kenan takes all the credit for Demir's help in order to rise in Asi's estimation.
| 13 | 13 | "Demir, Asi’ye kırılıyor" | Cevdet Mercan | January 25, 2008 |
Demir is upset at Asi's lack of confidence in him. He promised to help her father and asked Asi to wait a little longer before setting off to Syria with Kerim, where Bulent was last seen.
| 14 | 14 | "Asi aşkının peşine düşüyor" | Cevdet Mercan | February 1, 2008 |
İhsan is released from prison. Demir is angry that Asi didn't wait for him.
| 15 | 15 | "Cemal Ağa'nın oyunu" | Cevdet Mercan | February 8, 2008 |
At Defne and Kerim's engagement party, Cemal Ağa has a surprise for İhsan and Süheyla.
| 16 | 16 | "Demir ile Asi'nin arasına "geçmiş" giriyor" | Cevdet Mercan | February 15, 2008 |
Ökkeş (Aslan's father) seems to hide more than he admits to know about Süheyla's child.
| 17 | 17 | "Demir, geçmişin acısını Asi'den çıkarıyor" | Cevdet Mercan | February 22, 2008 |
After years of yearning for and believing that her son has died in childbirth, Süheyla finally finds out that Aslan is her son. This news changes the lives of the Kozcuoğlu family as well when İhsan, after a conversation with Sühelya, learns that Aslan is also his son.
| 18 | 18 | "Ağıldaki yangın gerçekleri ortaya çıkarıyor" | Cevdet Mercan | February 29, 2008 |
Aslan is caught in a fire at the farm. When Süheyla and İhsan openly fear for Aslan's life as much as his parents Fatma and Ökkeş, secrets can no longer be kept. After Aslan is rescued from the fire at the farm, Cemal Ağa reveals to the town that Aslan is Süheyla and İhsan's biological son. With this revelation Asi starts to understand why Demir tried to keep his distance from her.
| 19 | 19 | "Demir, Asi'ye kırılıyor" | Cevdet Mercan | March 7, 2008 |
In order to get away for a while, Asi goes to Istanbul to attend to her grandfather's business matters. When Demir hears Asi is going to Istanbul, he decides to leave town with Asi and spend some time with her.
| 20 | 20 | "Asi ve Demir ailelerini karşılarına alıyor" | Cevdet Mercan | March 14, 2008 |
Despite their parents being against a match between the two families, Defne and Kerim decide to marry nonetheless without their parents' knowledge.
| 21 | 21 | "Asi ve Demir arasındaki gerilim devam ediyor" | Cevdet Mercan | March 21, 2008 |
Defne's parents are as much against their marriage as Kerim's family. The newlyweds have no other choice but to temporarily stay at Cemal Ağa's house.
| 22 | 22 | "Demir, Asi’ye söz veriyor" | Cevdet Mercan | March 28, 2008 |
To the dismay of both Kerim and Demir, Süheyla gives Aslan the mortgage papers for the Kozcuoğlu farm. The still embittered Süheyla encourages Aslan's bitterness towards İhsan.
| 23 | 23 | "Demir, Asi'ye destek oluyor" | Cevdet Mercan | April 4, 2008 |
Aslan takes over the Kozcuoğlu farm. While Neriman and her daughters stay with Cemal Ağa, Defne manages to reconcile with her father and she is able to convince him to stay with her and Kerim. When a storm breaks out, Asi and her father İhsan go back to the Kozcuoğlu farm to help Aslan rescue the fields from flooding. Asi tries to find a way to better their family's finances. Therefore, when her grandfather offers for her to manage his farm in Adana this is a welcome proposal. Demir, however, doesn't want Asi to leave town. Meanwhile Gonca (the third sister) starts dating Ziya.
| 24 | 24 | "Asi, Demir'i kıskanıyor" | Cevdet Mercan | April 11, 2008 |
Demir manages to purchase the Kozcuoğlu farm, which he plans to give back to the rightful owner. At Gonca's wedding, Demir gives Asi the gold necklace back at her request and asks her to always wear it as a symbol of their love.
| 25 | 25 | "Demir'den Asi'ye sürpriz" | Cevdet Mercan | April 18, 2008 |
The Kozcuoğlu family moves back to their farm. Demir gives Asi a new horse as a present to make up for what happened to her much loved horse.
| 26 | 26 | "Demir aşkını ifade edecek mi?" | Cevdet Mercan | April 25, 2008 |
Asi and Demir finally confess their love for each other.
| 27 | 27 | "Demir, Asi ile ailesi arasında kalıyor" | Cevdet Mercan | May 2, 2008 |
Just in time, Demir manages to save Süheyla. Süheyla's suicide attempt brings Demir, Melek and Aslan closer to Süheyla but causes Demir to once again distance himself from Asi.
| 28 | 28 | "Ayrılık Demir'i de Asi'yi de yaralıyor!" | Cevdet Mercan | May 9, 2008 |
A new businessman, Ali, arrives in Antakya with the goal to invest there. He immediately develops an interest in Asi.
| 29 | 29 | "Demir’i, Asi’yi kaybetme korkusu sardı" | Cevdet Mercan | May 16, 2008 |
To Demir's dismay, Ali openly shows that he is attracted to Asi. Süheyla experiences difficulties recovering from her suicide attempt.
| 30 | 30 | "Demir ile Ali, Asi için savaşıyor" | Cevdet Mercan | May 23, 2008 |
On Asi's birthday, she is given a surprise party. Asi takes off Demir's necklace because she believes him to be indifferent towards her and puts on her new necklace, a birthday present from Ali. Gonca is pregnant and things start to get better between her and Ziya.
| 31 | 31 | "Demir'in hayatı tehlikede" | Cevdet Mercan | May 30, 2008 |
Things between Asi and Demir seem hopeless. Asi encounters Zeynep at Demir's house and draws the wrong conclusions.
| 32 | 32 | "Asi ve Demir birbirlerini kıskanıyor!" | Cevdet Mercan | June 6, 2008 |
Asi can no longer trust Demir despite his constant pleas for her to trust and believe in him. Ali proposes marriage to Asi and she declines. However, she tells Demir that she has accepted Ali's proposal.
| 33 | 33 | "Asi'nin oyunu Demir'i küstürüyor!" | Cevdet Mercan | June 13, 2008 |
Things between Asi and Demir become more complicated when Asi overhears that Demir is going to marry Zeynep, the woman whose life he saved.
| 34 | 34 | "Asi'de muhteşem sezon finali" | Cevdet Mercan | June 27, 2008 |
Asi, who has overheard that Demir is going to marry Zeynep, is deeply hurt and accepts Ali's marriage proposal. However, Asi and Demir finally overcome prejudices and misunderstandings and they reunite. Cemal Ağa (Asi's grandfather) has been found murdered in his bedroom but the only suspect is Demir who tried to give a false statement to protect Aslan who was also about to kill Cemal Ağa.

=== Season 2 (2008—2009) ===
| No. overall | No. in season | Title | Directed by | Original release date |
|---|---|---|---|---|
| 35 | 1 | "Asi-Demir aşkında artık gurur değil, aşk galip gelmeye başlayacak" | Cevdet Mercan | September 12, 2008 |
Demir returns from Paris and proposes marriage to Asi and is accepted. The new district attorney Namik arrives in town to deal with the murder case of Cemal Ağa.
| 36 | 2 | "Demir’in başı büyük dertte" | Cevdet Mercan | September 19, 2008 |
Ghaleb tells the police that Demir was at Cemal Ağa's house the day he was killed. İhsan learns that Demir had followed Aslan that day to hold him back, but on Süheyla's request Demir didn't tell the police the entire story.
| 37 | 3 | "Demir suçsuzluğunu ispatlamaya çalışıyor" | Cevdet Mercan | September 26, 2008 |
Leyla goes back to Istanbul. Demir is under observation. Neriman is convinced that Demir and Aslan have something to do with the murder of her father. She is strictly against her daughter Asi ever meeting Demir again.
| 38 | 4 | "Demir ile Asi nikâh hazırlığı yapıyor" | Cevdet Mercan | October 10, 2008 |
Evidence has cleared Demir from any suspicion. However, Ali, who is still in love with Asi, tries to harm Demir and even works with Ghaleb.
| 39 | 5 | "Asi ile Demir’in düğünü var!" | Cevdet Mercan | October 17, 2008 |
Asi and Demir's wedding day nears. While they want to keep the wedding small, Neriman overrules them and proposes a grand celebration in memory of her father's wishes. Demir learns that Ghaleb has found Zeynep's whereabouts in Istanbul. In an attempt to save her life, Kerim and Demir go to Istanbul. Ali manages to falsify evidence in order to point towards Demir as the murderer of Cemal Ağa.
| 40 | 6 | "Demir tutuklanıyor, Asi şokta" | Cevdet Mercan | October 24, 2008 |
On Asi and Demir's wedding day, Demir is arrested. The murder weapon that Ali put into Demir's house is found there. Ali is more than happy about Demir's arrest.
| 41 | 7 | "Demir ile Asi’nin zor günleri" | Cevdet Mercan | October 31, 2008 |
Asi suggests that Demir should think about the possibility of pledging guilty in order to reduce the sentence. Demir insists on his innocence and is disappointed by the lack of confidence and no longer wants to see his wife.
| 42 | 8 | "Demir ile Asi ayrılığın eşiğinde" | Cevdet Mercan | November 7, 2008 |
Demir's innocence can be proved and he is released from prison. When Asi learns that he wants a divorce she is disappointed and saddened.
| 43 | 9 | "Demir, kötü bir kaza geçirir" | Cevdet Mercan | November 14, 2008 |
Asi tenderly cares for Demir after his fall from a horse. The accident seems to do their marriage good while things between Kerim and Defne get worse.
| 44 | 10 | "Asi ile Demir boşanacak mı?" | Cevdet Mercan | November 21, 2008 |
Asi disapprovingly observes that Ali gets closer to Melek in order to be near her. The devastated Defne sees Kerim with another woman.
| 45 | 11 | "Asi ile Demir arasındaki buzlar eriyor" | Cevdet Mercan | November 28, 2008 |
Asi decides to cultivate an organic farm. Asi and Demir can gradually overcome their quarrels. Demir who hears of Melek and Ali's liaison, forbids them ever to meet again.
| 46 | 12 | "Asi ile Demir aşka kavuşuyor" | Cevdet Mercan | December 5, 2008 |
Asi and Demir reconcile while Defne decides to divorce Kerim. Süheyla and Namik's constant meetings entail rumors of a love affair in town.
| 47 | 13 | "Ali, Demir ile Asi'yi karşı karşıya getiriyor" | Cevdet Mercan | December 19, 2008 |
Asi starts planning and working for her organic farm. Unfortunately, Demir's planned new manufactory seems to pose a threat to her plans.
| 48 | 14 | "Asi'nin hayatı tehlikede" | Cevdet Mercan | December 26, 2008 |
For Asi's sake, Demir proposes looking for a new area to build the manufactory, and initially succeeds in convİncing his new business partner Zafer until Ali once again interferes. He is still grimly trying to damage Demir and even gives Zafer a hint that the way to apply pressure on Demir is through his wife. When Demir declines to work with Zafer and Ali, Zafer orders to kidnap Asi and thereby force an involvement. Demir fears losing Asi whose life is in danger. In order to find her, he is even prepared to work with the mafia.
| 49 | 15 | "Asi, vicdan azabı çekiyor" | Cevdet Mercan | January 16, 2009 |
In an attempt to save Asi, Ali puts her in even more danger. Asi tries to tell him off and thereby accidentally hurts him who is then immediately taken to hospital.
| 50 | 16 | "Demir ile Asi’nin arası açılıyor" | Cevdet Mercan | January 23, 2009 |
Demir accepts Ali's business proposition only on the term that Ali keeps his distance from Melek. Ali accepts Demir's terms with no intention of keeping them and proposes marriage to Melek. Defne and Kerim divorce because she believes that he is cheating on her.
| 51 | 17 | "Demir, Asi’den git gide uzaklaşıyor" | Cevdet Mercan | January 30, 2009 |
Demir learns that his father might still be alive. The Kozcuoğlus gain a new family member as Gonca (Asi's sister) gives a birth to a daughter.
| 52 | 18 | "Demir ile Asi arasında yeni bir kriz" | Cevdet Mercan | February 6, 2009 |
Ali openly tells Asi that he only proposed marriage to Melek so that he could be near her. Asi is shocked and angered. She doesn't know whether to tell Demir who is vigorously against a match between his sister and Ali.
| 53 | 19 | "Demir ile Asi barışıyor" | Cevdet Mercan | February 13, 2009 |
Demir is able to locate his long-lost father Haydar in Syria. On Melek and Ali's wedding, Demir happily brings his newly found father along.
| 54 | 20 | "Demir ile Asi’nin arasına geçmiş giriyor" | Cevdet Mercan | February 20, 2009 |
Haydar's unkind behavior towards Asi is based on his prejudices against her family. Kerim gets jealous at Zafer's advances towards Defne.
| 55 | 21 | "Demir ile Asi romantik bir yolculuğa çıkıyor" | Cevdet Mercan | February 27, 2009 |
Despite being newly married to Melek, Ali still tries to get closer to Asi. Consequently, Asi gives Ali an ultimatum to leave her house as soon as possible. Melek witnesses this scene and draws false conclusions. Namik declares his love for Süheyla and proposes marriage.
| 56 | 22 | "Asi, hamile olduğunu Demir’e açıklayabilecek mi?" | Cevdet Mercan | March 6, 2009 |
In a farewell letter, Melek explains that she is convinced that Ali and Asi have an affair, and consequently drowns herself. Devastated, Demir leaves Asi and everything behind without even wanting to listen to the wrongly accused Asi. She is not even able to tell him that she is pregnant. Eventually, Asi gives birth to a daughter.
| 57 | 23 | "Yıllar sonra..." | Cevdet Mercan | March 13, 2009 |
Five years have passed. Asi and Demir have long been divorced. On their way back to Antakya, Süheyla and her husband Namik have an accident. This brings Demir and Kerim once again back to Antakya, leaving the Kozcuoğlu family in dismay. Especially when Demir, by mere chance, meets Asya without knowing that she is his daughter.
| 58 | 24 | "Asya, Demir'in yüreğinde yeni bir umut oluyor" | Cevdet Mercan | March 20, 2009 |
When Demir learns that Asya is Asi's daughter, he suspects that she could be his daughter. Especially since Asya was wearing the gold necklace that Demir gave Asi a couple of years ago as a symbol of his love and which Asi gave her daughter as a reminder of her father. Therefore, he decides to stay in Antakya in order to find out who Asya's father is.
| 59 | 25 | "Demir ve Asi, Asya için çatışıyor" | Cevdet Mercan | March 27, 2009 |
Despite Demir's belief that Asya is his daughter, the Kozcuoğlu family keep declining this. Süheyla takes matters into her own hands and commissions a DNA-test. Demir, however, wants to hear the truth from Asi.
| 60 | 26 | "Demir gerçeği öğreniyor" | Cevdet Mercan | April 3, 2009 |
Cornered, Asi tells Demir that Asya is his daughter. When Demir and his family overwhelm Asi and her daughter with their over-eager behavior, she decides to leave town for a while.
| 61 | 27 | "Asi kayıp, Demir öfkeli" | Cevdet Mercan | April 10, 2009 |
Demir discovers Asi and Asya in Syria. Angry at Asi, he wants her to experience for herself what it is like to lose a child and decides to take Asya with him without informing Asi where they are.
| 62 | 28 | "Asi ve Demir'den yeni bir karar" | Cevdet Mercan | April 17, 2009 |
Demir who has found out where Asi and Asya are, seizes the opportunity and takes his daughter Asya back with him to Turkey.
| 63 | 29 | "Asi ve Demir barışıyor" | Cevdet Mercan | April 24, 2009 |
For their daughter's sake, Asi and Demir decide to deal politely with each other. Asya is overjoyed to have Demir in her life. He can't wait to tell Asya that he is her father. Zafer wants their relationship to take the next step while Defne is confused by Kerim's presence. Kerim starts planning to convict Zafer who is still involved in dubious businesses.
| 64 | 30 | "Demir'in hastalığı ne?" | Cevdet Mercan | May 1, 2009 |
Asya seems to be ready to accept Demir as her father as he gradually grows dearer to her. They make their first boat trip with the ship that Demir had built with Asya's help. Süheyla wants Demir to be happy and believes that her nephew and the new doctor, İnci, might be a nice couple. Meanwhile, Kerim's plan doesn't work out as intended when Zafer receives a tip in the last minute.
| 65 | 31 | "Demir’in ateşle imtihanı" | Cevdet Mercan | May 8, 2009 |
Demir learns of his illness and decides not to instantly tell Asya that he is her father. He is no longer able to keep his illness a secret from Kerim who is devastated at the news. He tells Süheyla of Demir's illness.
| 66 | 32 | "Büyük aşk yeniden alevlenecek mi?" | Cevdet Mercan | May 15, 2009 |
Asi realizes that she still loves Demir who has also never stopped loving her. Nonetheless he tries to keep his distance because of his illness until he hears that Asi went to see him in Assos three years ago. Süheyla tells İhsan of Demir's cancer. Meanwhile, Zafer tries to find out who has tried to convict him.
| 67 | 33 | "Aşk, Demir'i hayata bağlayabilecek mi?" | Cevdet Mercan | May 22, 2009 |
To help Demir, Süheyla, İhsan and Haydar go to Istanbul for bone marrow transplant compatibility tests. The test results, however, show no compatibility. Namik and Neriman misunderstand the situation and suspect an affair between Süheyla and İhsan. Kerim and Defne's love starts blossoming while Zafer begins suspecting Kerim as the man who tried to put him in prison. Aslan makes an effort to show İnci that he is attracted to her.
| 68 | 34 | "Asi gerçeği öğrenecek mi?" | Cevdet Mercan | May 29, 2009 |
Demir doesn't want Asi to know about his illness. When he has to go to Istanbul to receive a chemotherapy, he asks İnci to accompany him. Doubts spread into Asi's mind whether their love has still a chance. Before going to Istanbul with Demir, Kerim asks Defne to marry him again and she accepts. The jealous Zafer can't watch this inertly and kidnaps Kerim.
| 69 | 35 | "Asi, Demir'den hesap soruyor" | Cevdet Mercan | June 5, 2009 |
Asi cannot understand why Demir has to suddenly go to Istanbul after declaring his love for her. This time, she does not want her pride or anything else to come between her love. Therefore, Asi decides to go to Istanbul and openly talk to Demir. Her suspicion that Demir and İnci have an affair is reinforced when she arrives in Istanbul. Saddened and disillusioned, Asi returns home and is finally told the truth when İhsan tells her of Demir's illness. In the meantime, blinded by jealousy Zafer dies in an attempt to kill Kerim.
| 70 | 36 | "Asi, Demir için savaşıyor" | Cevdet Mercan | June 12, 2009 |
Asi immediately wants to return to Demir after hearing that he has cancer. She is able to give him courage and hope by declaring her love for him. Moreover, she can also convince Demir that they have to finally tell Asya that he is her father. Asya is overjoyed about the news that Demir is her father. Kerim and Defne marry a second time and decide to move to Istanbul where Defne wants to open a restaurant with specialties from Antakya.
| 71 | 37 | "Asi'de muhteşem final" | Cevdet Mercan | June 19, 2009 |
In the final episode of Asi, Asya's wishes one by one come true. Thanks to his daughter, Demir can overcome his illness. Demir accepts Asi's marriage proposal and they marry once again in a private ceremony on the beach. Aslan and İnci also marry and have a grand celebration in the garden of the Kozcuoğlu plantation. The pregnant Defne and her husband Kerim move to Istanbul. Demir, who has promised to build a tree house for his daughter, can now keep his promise and starts working on the tree house. Asya is delighted to see her father and mother happily together and she is able to help them forget past pains.
