= Deniz Barut =

Turkish actress

- Born: 29 March 1983 (age 43); Denizli, Turkey
- Education: Bahçeşehir University
- Occupation: Actress
- Years active: 1997–present
- Spouse: Şafak Bakkalbaşıoğlu (m. 2005; div. 2019) Yüksel Aksu (m. 2025, m)
- Children: 2

Deniz Barut (born 29 March 1983) is a Turkish film and television actress.

== Life and career ==
Deniz Barut was born on 29 March 1983 in Denizli. She finished her primary and secondary education in Denizli before moving to İzmir to pursue her passion for volleyball in high school. She is a graduate of Bahçeşehir University School of Communications with a degree in photography and video making. Her photographs were later shown at different exhibitions in Turkey. In 1997, she took part in the beauty contest Elite Model Look, where she ranked second.

In 2000, she stopped playing volleyball in a professional capacity and moved to Istanbul. She began taking speech and diction lessons at Can Gürzap's Dialog Institute. She also took acting lessons at Şahika Tekand's acting academy, Stüdyo Oyuncuları. She subsequently began working for Star TV and presented news, sports, and life style programs. Barut made her professional acting debut with the TV series Kaybolan Yıllar in 2006. Her other acting credits include Lale Devri, Kara Para Aşk, and Avlu. Aside from her career on television she has appeared in a number of movies, including Sesinde Aşk Var and Baba Parası.

In 2018, she began contributing to literature journal Kafka Okur.

== Personal life ==
Barut married director Şafak Bakkalbaşıoğlu in 2005, with whom she has two sons named Kuzey and Uzay. They divorced in 2019. She began a relationship with Yüksel Aksu in 2021 and married him in 2015.

== Filmography ==
=== Television ===
| Year | Title | Role | Network | Episode no. | Notes |
|---|---|---|---|---|---|
| 2002 | Dadı | Beauty Contest Nominee | Star TV | 1 episode | Guest appearance |
| 2006–2007 | Kaybolan Yıllar | Melek | Star TV | 11 episodes | |
| 2010 | Elde Var Hayat | Yüksel | TRT1 | | |
| 2012 | Anneler ile Kızları | Çağla | Star TV | 13 episodes | |
| 2012–2014 | Lale Devri | Azra Doğan | Fox | 48 episodes | |
| 2014–2015 | Kara Para Aşk | Pınar | ATV | 32 episodes | |
| 2015 | Son Çıkış | Nilüfer | TRT1 | 17 episodes | |
| 2016 | Hayatımın Aşkı | Eylem | Kanal D | 17 episodes | |
| 2018–2019 | Avlu | Melis Ersoy | Star TV | 44 episodes | |
| 2019 | Hekimoğlu | | Kanal D | 1 episode | Guest appearance |
| 2020–2021 | Sol Yanım | Nil | Star TV | 12 episodes | |
| 2021–2022 | Destan | Ulu Ece | atv | 28 episodes | Main role |
| 2022–2023 | Kuruluş Osman | İsmihan Sultan | atv | 23 episodes | |
| 2023 | Ateş Kuşları | Perihan | atv | 5 episodes | |
| 2026 | Mehmed: Fetihler Sultanı | Selcuk Shah Begum | TRT1 | | Main role |

=== Film ===
| Year | Title | Role |
|---|---|---|
| 2017 | Poyraz Karayel: Küresel Sermaye | Karadul |
| 2018 | Nezih Bir Film | Emine |
| 2019 | Sesinde Aşk Var | Banu |
| 2020 | Baba Parası | Attorney Aslı |
