= Mollagürani =

- Neighbourhood
- Location in Turkey Mollagürani (Istanbul)
- Coordinates: 41°0′47″N 28°56′31″E
- Country: Turkey
- Province: Istanbul
- District: Fatih
- Population (2022): 12,211
- Time zone: UTC+3 (TRT)
- Postal code: 34093
- Area code: 0212

Mollagürani (also: Molla Gürani) is one of the 57 neighbourhoods of the municipality and district of Fatih, Istanbul Province in Turkey. Its population is 12,211 (2022). It is on the European side of Istanbul.

Mollagürani is named after one of the teachers of Fatih Sultan Mehmed, the fourth Sheikh al-Islam of the Ottoman Empire Molla Gürâni.

It has access to T1 Kabatas-Bagcilar Tram Line at the Yusufpaşa Tramway Station

== Places in Mollagürani ==
Çapa Science High School: is a historical school in the Fatih district of Istanbul.

Yavuz Selim Madrasah, also Yenibahçe Selim Madrasah Madrasah built by Sinan upon order by Suleiman the magnificent to honour his father Selim. It currently hosts a private hospital.

Muratpaşa Park is one of the most crowded spots of Fatih. In the past, it used to rest people, but after a recent renovation, it does the same job better. Muratpaşa Park, which is decorated with trees along the road, covers an area of 3160 square meters.
