= Saygın Soysal =

Turkish actor (born 1982)

- Born: 21 May 1982 (age 43); Ankara, Turkey
- Occupation: Actor
- Years active: 2005–present
- Spouse: Gökçe Uzun (m. 2018; div. 2020)

Saygın Soysal (born 21 May 1982) is a Turkish actor.

== Life and career ==
Soysal was born on 21 May 1982 in Ankara as the only child of his family. His father is from Çaykara and his mother is from Ilgaz. At the age of two, he moved with his family to Bursa. They later settled in Trabzon, where he finished his high school. Soysal is a graduate of Hacettepe University State Conservatory with a degree in performing arts. He made his television debut in 2005 with a role in the series Kırık Kanatlar, portraying the character of Çavuş Yunus. In 2006, he joined the cast of Hatırla Sevgili, portraying Recep Tayyip Erdoğan. He further rose to prominence in 2013 with his role in the historical drama series Muhteşem Yüzyıl. In 2014, he starred in Kara Para Aşk along with Tuba Büyüküstün and Engin Akyürek. In 2017, he briefly appeared in Payitaht: Abdülhamid before being cast in a recurring role in Çukur. He was a regular on the Netflix original series Hakan: Muhafız (known in English as The Protector), and starred in the TV series Maraşlı in 2021.

== Filmography ==
=== TV series ===
Title	Role	Year
Güz Yangını	Agency owner	2005
Kırık Kanatlar	Çavuş Yunus	2005
Hatırla Sevgili	Recep Tayyip Erdoğan	2006
Asi	Aslan Kozcuoğlu	2007–08
Bu Kalp Seni Unutur mu?	Kürşat Süvarioğlu	2009
Türkan	Ali	2010
Al Yazmalım	Tahir Oğuz	2011
Muhteşem Yüzyıl	Mercan ağa	2013
Tatar Ramazan	Bulgarian Ferit	2013
Kara Para Aşk	Fatih "Metin" Dündar	2014–15
46 Yok Olan	Doğan	2016
Payitaht: Abdülhamid	Theodor Herzl	2017
Çukur	Elvis	2018
Hakan: Muhafız	Mergen	2018–20
Nöbet	Gendarmerie Senior Captain Yiğit Akan	2019
Maraşlı	Savaş	2021

=== Film ===
Title	Role	Year
Tiksinti	Kamil	2007
Kosmos	Anti-Signature Guy	2009
Yurt		2011
Jîn	Çavuş	2012
Sen Ben Lenin	Ufuk	2021
Hakikat Şeyh Bedrettin	Torlak Kemal	2021
