= Devrim Evin =

British/Turkish actor

- Born: 12 November 1978 (age 47); Gölbaşı, Adıyaman, Turkey
- Occupation: Actor
- Years active: 2001–present

Devrim Evin (born 12 November 1978) is a British/Turkish actor.

== Filmography ==
Film
Year	Film	Role	Notes
1999	Bizim Dersane	-	
2012	Fetih 1453	Sultan Mehmed II	
2014	Yunus Emre: Aşkın Sesi (Yunus Emre: Voice of Love)	Yunus Emre	

Year	TV series	Role
2005	İki Arada Aşk	-
2005	Kale İçi	Sipsi
2007	Suç Dosyası	
2014	Her Sevda Bir Veda	Turgut
2021-2022	Barbaroslar: Akdeniz'in Kılıcı	Murad/Antuan "Poseidon"
2024–present	Kudüs Fatihi Selahaddin Eyyubi	Kral Amalric
