= Molla Gürâni =

15th-century Ottoman judge

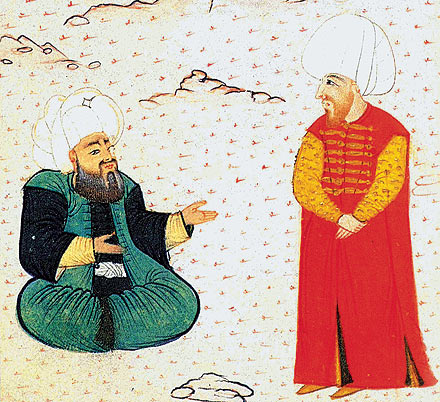
Molla Gürâni (seated) in a miniature taken from the biographical encyclopaedia Al-Shaqāʾiq al-Nuʿmāniyya fī ʿUlamāʾ al-Dawla al-ʿUthmāniyya compiled by Taşköprülüzade Ahmet (c. mid-16th century)

Molla Gürâni was a 15th-century Kurdish Ottoman administrator and mufti. He became the chief judge of the Ottoman Empire under Mehmed II after the death of Murad II in 1451. Gürâni was part of Mehmed's council during the conquest of Constantinople, and he wrote an account of the conquest that was sent to the Mamluk sultan. In 1480, he was appointed mufti of Istanbul or Shaykh al-Islām, a position he held for the rest of his life, serving under both Mehmed II and Bayezid II. Gürâni built several institutions in Istanbul, and he died there in 1488.

== Early life ==
Gürâni was born on August 28, 1406, or in 1410 or in 1411, in a place called Gûrân in Esfarayen or in Shahrizor or near Diyarbekir or near Halabja, and given the name Şemseddin Ahmed b. İsmâil or Şerefeddin or Şehâbeddin. He was later also given the honorific mollâ or mevlânâ and became known by the nisba Gürânî, Şehrizorî, Hemedânî, Tebrîzî, Kâhirî, or Rûmî, thus his usual appellation Molla Gürâni. He may have been of Kurdish ancestry.

He studied qira'at, kalam, tafsir, nahw (Arabic syntax), and fiqh in Baghdad and Arabic language and literature in Hasankeyf. At 17, he moved on to study in Damascus for five years and then to Jerusalem. After that, he moved on to Cairo, where he studied hadith, qira'at, tafsir, and fiqh, and received his ijazah from Ibn Hajar.

== Mamluk career ==
Gürâni was appointed mudarris of fiqh at the Barquq Madrasa in Cairo and participated in scholarly assemblies in the court of Mamluk Sultan Sayf al-Din Jaqmaq, although in 1440 after a dispute with another scholar, he was found guilty of insulting the scholar's ancestors, sentenced to 80 blows with a rod (değnek), removed from his madrasa position, and exiled to Damascus.

== Ottoman career ==
Around the time of his punishment, either in Aleppo or Cairo, Gürâni met Ottoman scholar Molla Yegân, who brought him to Sultan Murad II; the sultan appointed him mudarris first in the Kaplıca Madrasa in Bursa and then in the Yıldırım Madrasa. At some point, he changed from the Shafi'i school of jurisprudence to the Hanafi School. In 1443 he was appointed teacher (hoca) to Murad's son Mehmet, and he probably remained with Mehmed when Murad abdicated in favor of Mehmed in 1444 and when Murad returned to the throne in 1446.

After Murad's death in 1451, Mehmed again became sultan and offered him a position as vizier, which he refused, and then a position as kazasker, which he accepted. He was part of Mehmed's council during the conquest of Constantinople and afterward wrote the account of events, the fetihnâme that was sent to the Mamluk sultan.

He was dismissed as kazasker in 1455 for acting too independently and sent to Bursa as qadi and as administrator (mütevelli) of evkaf. He was dismissed from this post for tearing up a firman he considered contrary to Sharia and beating its bearer. He then went on hajj, passing through Aleppo, Damascus, and Jerusalem on the way, and returning to Istanbul in 1458. At that time he was again appointed qadi in Bursa.

In 1480 he was appointed mufti of Istanbul or Shaykh al-Islām, a position he held till his death, serving under both Mehmed II and Bayezid II. He was said to have a modest but dignified personality and superior morality, to be uncompromising in knowledge, and to be unhesitant in expressing his opinions.

He died in 1488, in Istanbul, and was buried in the Aksaray neighborhood of Istanbul or near Yüksek Kaldırım in Karaköy, Istanbul.

== Legacy ==
Gürâni built several institutions in Istanbul, including a mosque in Çapa; small mosques (mescit) in Galata, Mercan, and Vefa; a hadith school (dârülhadîs) in Vefa; elementary schools in Çapa, Galata, and Vefa; a hammam in Mercan; and a han in Bahçekapı. Of these, only the small mosque in Mercan was still in existence in the 1970s. He also had a Byzantine church converted into a mosque, now known as the Molla Gürani Mosque.

The neighborhood surrounding Gürâni's mosque in Çapa, Istanbul, became known as the Molla Gürâni neighborhood and is still known as that even though the mosque burned in 1917.

Gürâni's descendant, Burhaneddîn İbrâhîm El-Gurânî (1616/17-1697), was the author of more than 100 scholarly works.

The Güran family of the Bağlar district of Diyarbakır claims to be descended from Gürâni.
