= MY5 =

Uzbek television network

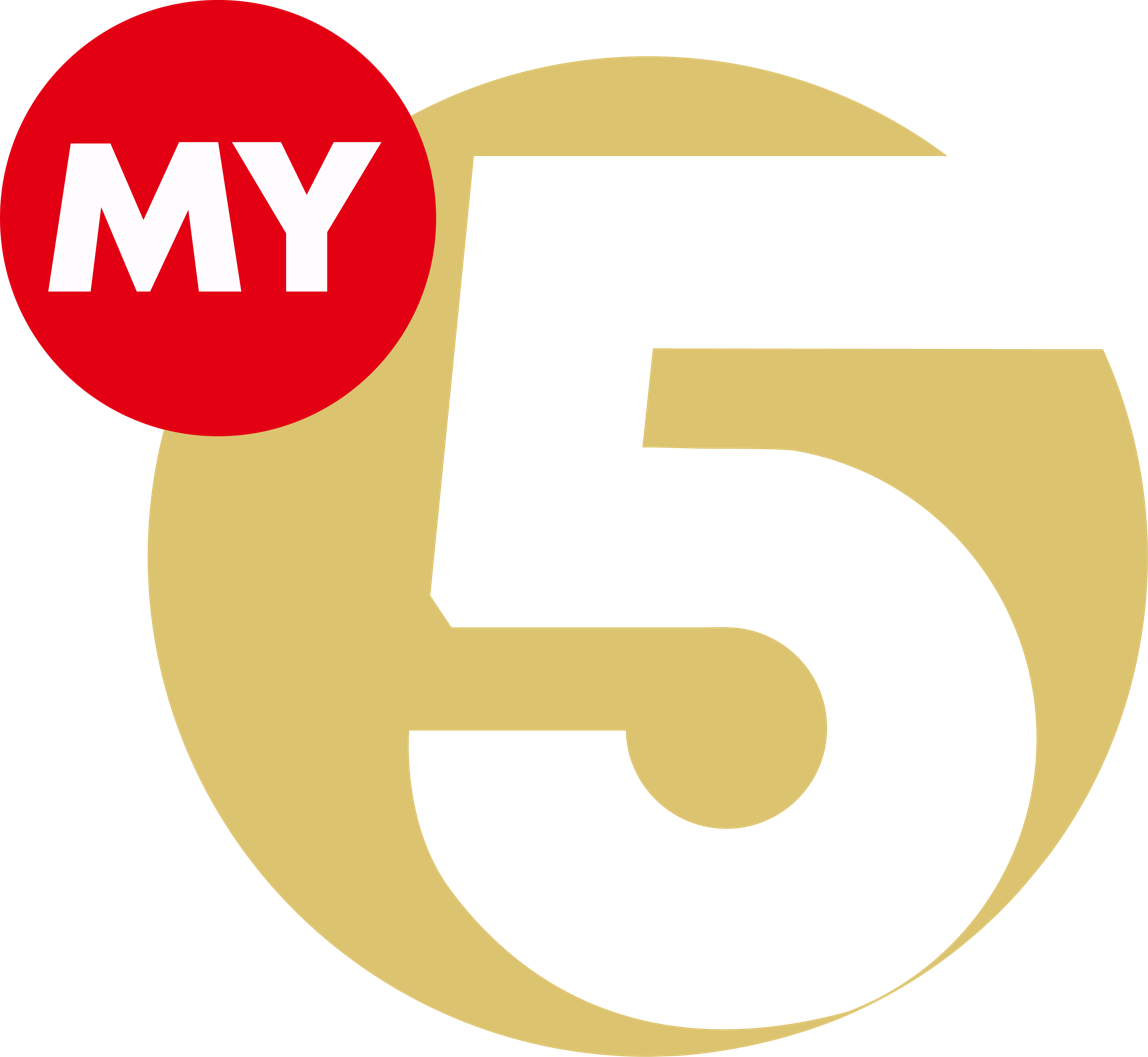
- Country: Uzbekistan
- Broadcast area: Uzbekistan
- Headquarters: Tashkent, Uzbekistan

Programming
- Languages: Uzbek; Russian
- Picture format: 16:9 HDTV

History
- Launched: 12 November 2014; 11 years ago

Mening Yurtim (My Country), branded as MY5, is an Uzbek television channel aimed at families, airing musical, educational and entertainment content. Its broadcasts began on 12 November 2014 and it broadcasts in Uzbek and Russian.

== History ==
The channel started test broadcasting on 12 November 2014 for a potential audience of five million people in Tashkent. Most programming was produced by the channel, including programs made by the Kamolot youth association. Full broadcasts would begin in December, coinciding with Constitution Day. In its early years, most of its audience consisted of middle school and high school students, as well as housewives.

In August-September 2021, the channel was fined for airing movies without obtaining the rights to them.

Amirxon Umarov was appointed director in 2019. While the channel was well rated in its early years, successive changes in its director led to it falling to fifth or sixth place among local audiences. Axmedov, who returned to the team after a two-year absence, planned in March 2022 to improve its situation.
