= Saruca Pasha =

Ottoman statesman and admiral (Unknown–1415)

Kapudan Pasha
- Monarch: Murad I

Military service
- Branch/service: Ottoman Navy; Ottoman Army
- Rank: Grand Admiral

Saruca Pasha (? - 1415) was an Kapudan Pasha Of Murad I. and Governor He commissioned and launched the first Ottoman fleet, consisting of 60 ships, from the Gallipoli naval yard. With this fleet, he embarked on expeditions in the Aegean Sea. He conducted naval raids on the islands of Euboea and Chios, as well as the coast of Greece, and captured vast spoils. Saruca Pasha was of Turkish origin and probably died in 1415.
