= Görkem =

Görkem or Gorkem is a Turkish-language masculine and (to a lesser extent also) feminine given name with the meaning "glory, splendor, gorgeousness". Notable people with the name include:

- Ahmet Görkem Görk (1983), Turkish footballer
- Görkem Sağlam (1998), German footballer of Turkish descent
- Görkem Sala (1992), Turkish singer, DJ, and hip hop artist
- Görkem Sevindik (1986), Turkish actor
- Görkem Yeltan (1977), Turkish actress
