= Cemre Baysel =

Turkish actress (born 1999)

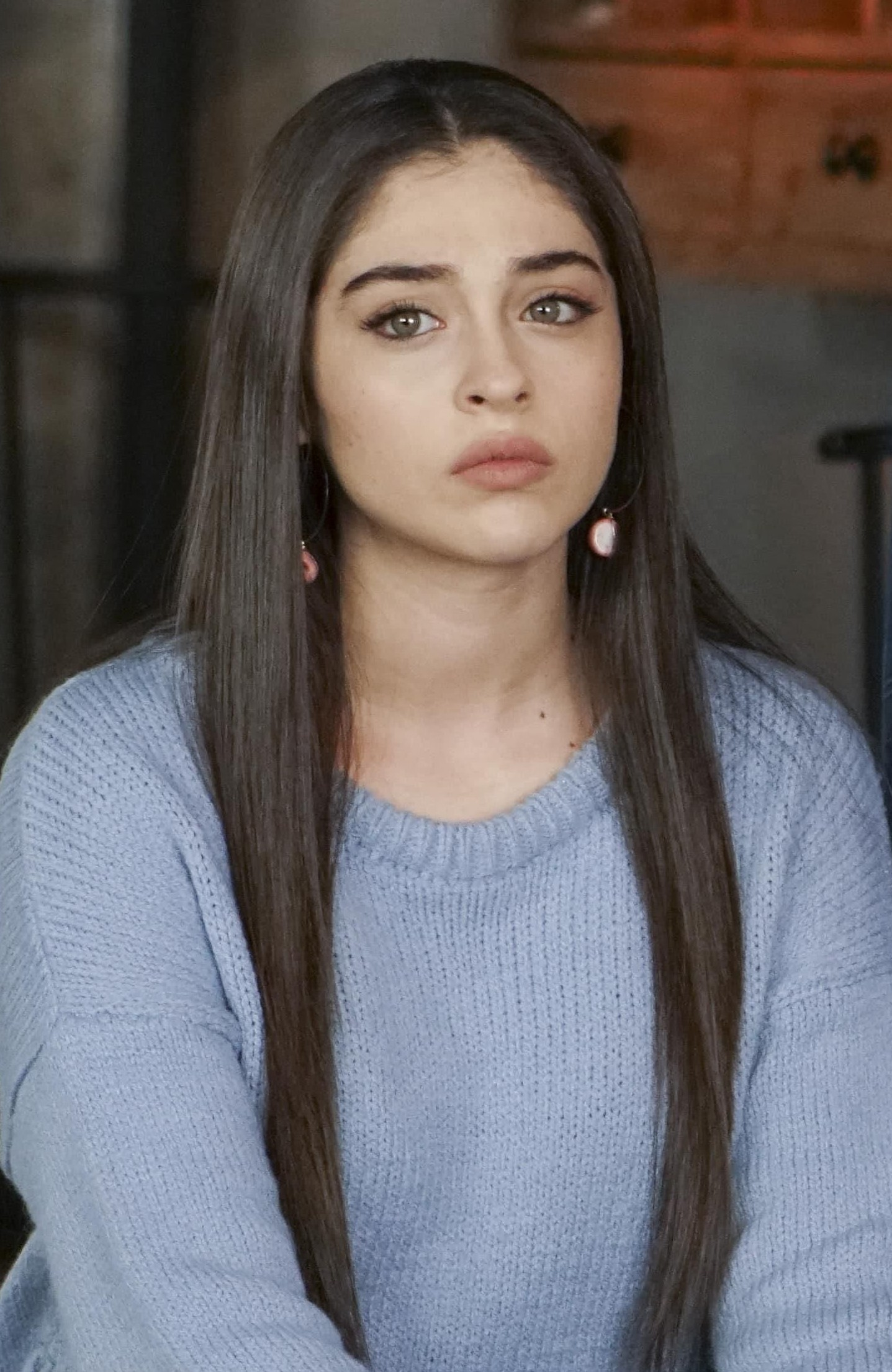
- Born: 5 February 1999 (age 27); İzmir, Turkey
- Education: Ege University
- Occupation: Actress
- Years active: 2014–present
- Height: 1.70 m (5 ft 6.93 in)

Cemre Baysel (5 February 1999) is a Turkish actress.

== Early life ==
Cemre Baysel was born on 5 February 1999 in İzmir. Her paternal family descended from the Balkans, while her maternal family is from Urfa.

She graduated from the Painting Department of Buca Işılay Saygın Fine Arts High School. She studied in the Art Teacher Department of Ege University.

== Career ==
At the age of fifteen, she made her television debut with a supporting role in the comedy series Yeşil Deniz. The series came back with a new season in 2023. She wasn't recast in the new season.

She subsequently appeared in crime series İsimsizler in 2017 before being cast in the historical drama series Payitaht: Abdülhamid as Firuze. She rose to prominence through her supporting role in Elimi Bırakma between 2018 and 2019.

In 2020, she was cast in her first leading role in the series Sol Yanım with Emre Bey who co-star of Elimi Bırakma. In 2021, she was cast as the lead in the romantic comedy series Baht Oyunu with Aytaç Şaşmaz as co-lead. Baysel and Şaşmaz started dating while shooting the series. She starred in the series Senden Daha Güzel, in which she plays the female lead character.

She joined BluTV's detective series Bozkır. With İlhan Şen, she acted in the movie Aşk Filmi and the crime series Ramo twice.

She was awarded as the Shining Star at the Golden Butterfly Awards in 2021. In 2022, she became the face of Seçil Store, Citroën Turkey, and La Roche-Posay.

== Filmography ==
Television
Year	Title	Role	Notes
2014–2016	Yeşil Deniz	Gonca Makasçı	Supporting role
2017	İsimsizler	Gülperi	Supporting role
2017–2018	Payitaht: Abdülhamid	Firuze	Supporting role
2018–2019	Elimi Bırakma	Melis Çelen	Supporting role
2020	Ramo	Fatoş	Supporting role
2020–2021	Sol Yanım	Biricik Ergün	Leading role
2021	Baht Oyunu	Ada Tözün	Leading role
2022	Senden Daha Güzel	Efsun Armağan	Leading role
2023	Sakla Beni	İncila Arıkan	Leading role
2024–2025	Leyla: Hayat... Aşk... Adalet...	Leyla Yılmaz / Ela Karaca	Leading role
2025–	Güller ve Günahlar	Zeynep Candan	Leading role
Web
Year	Title	Role	Notes
2023–	Bozkır	Sevda	Leading role
Films
Year	Title	Role	Notes
2023	Aşk Filmi	Yaz	Leading role
