= Endless Love (2015 TV series) =

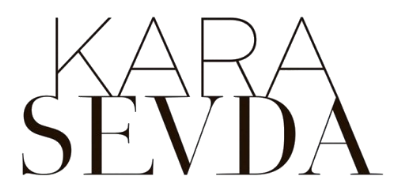
- Kara Sevda number 1
- Genre: Drama; Love; Romance
- Written by: Özlem Yılmaz; Burcu Görgün Toptaş; Anil Eke
- Directed by: Hilal Saral
- Starring: Burak Özçivit; Neslihan Atagül; Kaan Urgancıoğlu; Melisa Aslı Pamuk; Zerrin Tekindor; Hazal Filiz Küçükköse; Orhan Güner; Neşe Baykent; Zeyno Eracar; Rüzgar Aksoy; Barış Alpaykut; Burak Sergen; Gökay Müftüoglü; Ali Burak Ceylan
- Composer: Toygar Işıklı
- Country of origin: Turkey
- Original language: Turkish
- No. of seasons: 2
- No. of episodes: 114

Production
- Producer: Kerem Çatay
- Production location: Istanbul
- Running time: 113–158 minutes
- Production company: Ay Yapım

Original release
- Network: Star TV
- Release: 14 October 2015 – 21 June 2017

Endless Love (Turkish: Kara Sevda, literal translation Dark Love) is a Turkish drama series produced by Ay Yapım and broadcast on Star TV between 2015 and 2017. Directed by Hilal Saral, it stars Burak Özçivit, Neslihan Atagül and Kaan Urgancıoğlu.

The series later became a milestone in the international history of Turkish series, receiving the International Emmy Award for Best Telenovela in 2017, and becoming the first Turkish series to win the award.

Similarly, Kara Sevda received the special jury award at the Seoul International Drama Awards.

Four years after the end of Kara Sevda, the series was awarded as The Best International Soap Opera at the Soap Awards France 2021. Burak Özçivit and Neslihan Atagül were the only Turkish actors nominated for Best International Actor and Best International Actress, respectively.

According to Can Okan, founder and CEO of Inter Medya, the international distributor of the series, "words are useless when talking about the success of Kara Sevda". It has become one of the most watched Turkish series in the world, being broadcast in more than 110 countries with successful audiences and has been translated into more than 60 languages.

During its broadcast in the United States through Univision, it became the most watched foreign soap opera and the Turkish series with the highest audience. Kara Sevda remains the most watched series in Hispanic prime time, with more than 2 million viewers every day, and close to 4 million in its final episode.

Such has been the overwhelming success of the series that in the Wax Museum of Tashkent City Park in Uzbekistan, two figures of Kemal and Nihan are exhibited, the main characters of the series, in the part dedicated to Istanbul.

Kara Sevda's YouTube channel accumulated almost 3 billion views, being one of the most viewed Turkish series on the platform.

== Plot ==
Kemal Soydere is the son of a middle-class family; Nihan is the beautiful daughter of wealthy socialites Önder and Vildan Sezin, and also has a twin brother Ozan whom she loves dearly. Önder's business is slowly falling apart, and unable to give up her luxurious life, her mother Vildan pushes Nihan to marry Emir Kozcuoǧlu, who's infatuated with her. But Nihan is appalled at the idea as she despises Emir, perceiving him as ruthless and arrogant.

In his last year in mining engineering, Kemal meets Nihan when he helps her buy a bus ticket. The pair fall hopelessly in love at first sight and Nihan completely changes Kemal's monotonous life. Despite the class difference between them, they manage to be together. That is, until Emir stages an accident that results in Ozan killing a girl. To prevent Ozan from going to jail, Nihan agrees to marry Emir. The next day, she goes to meet Kemal at the port where he proposes to her; in tears, Nihan sadly turns down his marriage proposal and ends their relationship. Heartbroken, Kemal leaves Istanbul and goes to Zonguldak to work in the mines. He isolates himself in his work and one day, following his actions to help in an accident at the mine, Kemal is promoted and assumes a position of power in the company. Five years later, Kemal decides to return to Istanbul to face his past.

== Cast and characters ==
Main / Supporting
Actor	Role	Notes
Burak Özçivit	Kemal Soydere	Leading – Protagonist
Neslihan Atagül	Nihan Sezin	Leading – Protagonist
Kaan Urgancıoğlu	Emir Kozcuoğlu	Leading – Antagonist
Melisa Aslı Pamuk	Asu Alacahan Kozcuoğlu	Emir's sister, Female Antagonist
Hazal Filiz Küçükköse	Zeynep Soydere	Kemal's sister, Co-Antagonist
Zerrin Tekindor	Leyla Acemzade	Supporting
Orhan Güner	Hüseyin Soydere	Supporting
Zeyno Eracar	Fehime Soydere	Supporting
Neşe Baykent	Vildan Acemzade	Supporting
Rüzgar Aksoy	Tarık Soydere	Supporting
Barış Alpaykut	Ozan Sezin	Supporting Season 1
Kürşat Alnıaçık	Önder Sezin	Supporting Season 1
Ali Burak Ceylan	Tufan (Umut) Kaner	Supporting Antagonist
Burak Sergen	Galip Kozcuoğlu	Supporting Antagonist
Kerem Alışık	Ayhan Kandarlı	Supporting
Uğur Arslan	Fikret Aydıner (Zehir)	Supporting
Erhan Alpay	Hakan Tandurak	Supporting
Arven Beren	Deniz Soydere	Supporting
Recurring
Actor	Role	Notes
Çağla Demir	Banu Akmeriç	Season 1 & 2
Metin Coşkun	Hakkı Alacahan	Season 1 & 2
Gökay Müftüoglü	Salih	Season 1
Ece Mudessiroğlu	Zehra Tozkan	Season 2
Gizem Karaca	Mercan Yılmaz	Season 2

== Production ==
Kara Sevda has been shot entirely in the city of Istanbul, Turkey, with the exception of the mine explosion scene from the first episode, which was shot in Zonguldak. Some of the places where the series was filmed are:

- Üsküdar: Here is the neighborhood where Kemal Soydere's parents Fehime and Hüseyin Soydere live.
- Beşiktaş: In one of its neighborhoods, is where Leyla lives.
- Yeniköy: In this village, Nihan Sezin lives with her parents and also with Emir Kozcuoglu.
- Acibadem Universities: Part of this university became "Kozcuoglu Holding", the company of Emir and his father.

== Awards and nominations ==
Year	Organization	Category	Nominee(s)	Result	Ref.
2015	Bilkent Television Awards	Best Drama Actor	Burak Özçivit	Won	
2015	Ayaklı Newspaper Awards	Best Actor	Burak Özçivit	Won	
2015	Ayaklı Newspaper Awards	Best Actress	Neslihan Atagül Doğulu	Won	
2015	Ayaklı Newspaper Awards	Best Supporting Actor	Kaan Urgancıoğlu	Won	
2015	Ayaklı Newspaper Awards	Best Supporting Actress	Zerrin Tekindor	Won	
2016	International Conference on Occupational Health and Safety	Special Award	Kara Sevda	Won	
2016	Golden Object Awards	Best Actress	Neslihan Atagül	Won	
2016	Golden Object Awards	Best Supporting Actress	Hazal Filiz KucukKose	Won	
2016	KKTC Magazine Gazeteciler	Best Supporting Actress	Hazal Filiz KucukKose	Won	
2016	Magazinci.com Internet Media (Best)	TV Performance of the Year	Burak Özçivit	Won	
2016	Magazinci.com Internet Media (Best)	Series of the Year	Kara Sevda	Won	
2016	Magazinci.com Internet Media (Best)	Best Actress	Neslihan Atagül Doğulu	Won	
2016	Müzikonair Awards	Best Actress	Neslihan Atagül Doğulu	Won	
2016	Ege University 5th Media Awards	Best Actress	Neslihan Atagül Doğulu	Nominated	
2016	Ege University 5th Media Awards	Best Actor	Burak Özçivit	Nominated	
2016	6º Ayaklı Gazete TV Stars Awards	Best Drama Actress	Neslihan Atagül	Nominated	
2016	KTÜ Media Awards	Top Rated Actress	Neslihan Atagül	Nominated	
2016	43rd Pantene Golden Butterfly Awards	Best Actress	Neslihan Atagül	Nominated	
2016	43rd Pantene Golden Butterfly Awards	Best Actor	Burak Özçivit	Nominated	
2016	43rd Pantene Golden Butterfly Awards	Best Director	Hilal Saral	Nominated	
2016	43rd Pantene Golden Butterfly Awards	Best Series	Kara Sevda	Nominated	
2016	43rd Pantene Golden Butterfly Awards	Best Couple	Burak Özçivit & Neslihan Atagül Doğulu	Nominated	
2016	43rd Pantene Golden Butterfly Awards	Best Young Actress	Melisa Asli Pamuk	Won	
2016	Seoul International Drama Awards	Best Actress	Neslihan Atagül Doğulu	Nominated	
2016	Seoul International Drama Awards	Jury Special Prize	Endless Love	Won	
2017	Bilkent TV Awards	Best Actress	Neslihan Atagül Doğulu	Nominated	
2017	Turkish Children's Awards	Best Actress	Neslihan Atagül Doğulu	Nominated	
2017	Magazinci.com Internet Media Magazine Oscars Awards	Best Supporting Actress	Zerrin Tekindor	Won	
2017	45º International Emmy Awards	Best Telenovela	Endless Love	Won	
2017	Ayaklı Newspaper Awards	Best Supporting Actress	Melisa Asli Pamuk	Won	
2017	44th Pantene Golden Butterfly Awards	Best Soundtracks	Toygar isikli	Nominated	
2017	44th Pantene Golden Butterfly Awards	Best Actor	Burak Özçivit	Nominated	
2017	44th Pantene Golden Butterfly Awards	Best Young Actress	Hazal Filiz KucukKose	Won	
2021	Soap Awards France 2021	Best International Soap Opera	Endless Love	Won	
2021	Soap Awards France 2021	Best International Actor	Burak Özçivit	Nominated	
2021	Soap Awards France 2021	Best International Actress	Neslihan Atagül Doğulu	Nominated	
