= Zemheri =

Turkish TV series

- Genre: Romance; Drama
- Written by: Sema Ergenekon
- Directed by: Hilal Saral
- Starring: Alperen Duymaz; Ayça Ayşin Turan; Hazal Filiz Küçükköse; Caner Cindoruk
- Composers: Saki Çimen; Uğur Ateş
- Country of origin: Turkey
- Original language: Turkish
- No. of seasons: 1
- No. of episodes: 10 (33 International version)

Production
- Producer: Kerem Çatay
- Production location: Istanbul
- Running time: 130 minutes
- Production company: Ay Yapım

Original release
- Network: Show TV
- Release: 15 January – 18 March 2020

Zemheri is a Turkish drama television series signed by Ay Yapım, the first episode of which was broadcast on 15 January 2020, directed by Hilal Saral, written by Sema Ergenekon and starring Alperen Duymaz, Ayça Ayşin Turan, Hazal Filiz Kucukkose and Caner Cindoruk It ended with its 10th episode published on 18 March 2020, making it a final.

== Cast and characters ==
=== Main characters ===
- Alperen Duymaz as Ayaz Korkmaz
- Ayça Ayşin Turan as Firuze Pınar
- Caner Cindoruk as Ertan Demircan
- Hazal Filiz Küçükköse as Berrak Demircan
- Şebnem Dönmez as Mehveş Demircan
- Zerrin Tekindor as Aliye Pınar

=== Supporting characters ===
- Nihal Koldaş as Safiye Korkmaz
- Müfit Kayacan as Yaşar Pınar
- Emir Çubukçu as Faruk Pınar
- Aleyna Özgeçen as Elvan Pınar
- Lila Gürmen as İclal Demircan
- Tuğberk Sev as Korhan Korkmaz
- Eylül Lize Kandemir as Filiz Korkmaz
- İlkin Tüfekçi as Şule
- Sahra Şaş as Sevda
- Buket Gulbeyaz as Birsel
