= Safir (TV series) =

Turkish Television series

- Genre: drama
- Written by: Burcu Över
- Directed by: Semih Bagci
- Starring: Özge Yağız; Burak Berkay Akgül; İlhan Şen
- Country of origin: Turkey
- Original language: Turkish
- No. of series: 1
- No. of episodes: 26

Production
- Producer: Mehmet Yigit Alp
- Running time: 120 minutes
- Production company: NTC Media

Original release
- Network: ATV
- Release: 4 September 2023 – 26 February 2024

Safir (transl. Sapphire) is a Turkish television series produced by NTC Medya, directed by Semih Bağcı, and written by Burcu Över. The show belongs to the family drama genre. It premiered on Monday, 4 September 2023, on ATV. The series stars İlhan Şen as Ateş, Burak Berkay Akgül as Yaman and Özge Yağız as Feraye.

== Synopsis ==
In the region of Cappadocia, the Gülsoy family reunites when Ateş, the eldest son, returns from America due to his mother’s illness. The plan is for Ateş, Yaman, and Okan to take over the family business to honor their paternal grandfather's legacy. Yaman, deeply in love with Feraye, whose family are servants in the Gulsoy mansion plans to propose on Feraya’s birthday and the day Ates returns. However, fate has other plans, when a tragic incident on her birthday shatters their plans and changes the lives of everyone. As secrets unravel, the family faces danger, revenge, and unexpected decisions. Ateş, on the other hand, will both win new enemies and confront his brother with the radical decisions he takes to protect everyone he loves and his family. Eventually falling in love and marrying Feraye who is pregnant with Yaman’s child.

== Cast ==
=== Main ===
Özge Yağız as Feraye Yılmaz Gülsoy

- Feraye is a beautiful girl living in Cappadocia. She is a final year student at the Faculty of Fine Arts, Department of Fashion Design. Feraya and her family are servants in the Gulsoy mansion. She has a secret relationship with Yaman Gulsoy and soon becomes pregnant with his child, but circumstances gets her married to his older brother, Ates Gulsoy.

Burak Berkay Akgül as Yaman Gülsoy

- He is the protagonist and also the boyfriend of Feraye and father of her unborn child. He and Feraye have been in love since childhood and have a secret relationship. He is the middle son of the Gülsoy family and was left alone to handle the family business after Ates went abroad . He was forced to leave Feraye and married Feraye's step-sister Aleyna after Cemile (Feraye's step-mother had blackmailed Yaman into marrying Aleyna).

İlhan Şen as Ateş Gülsoy

- He is the protagonist, and eldest son of the Gülsoy family, which is later revealed he’s not the biological son. Educated abroad, polite, honest and fair. His mother Gülfem's favourite child. Ates returns to Turkey after many years in America and marries Feraye to protect her and her unborn child. Eventually, falling in love with her which is unreciprocated.

=== Recurring ===
Ipek Tuzcuoğlu as Gülfem Gülsoy

- The bride of the Gülsoy family is a vigorous, well-groomed, educated and beautiful woman. Mother of Ates, Yaman and Okan. She shows more favouritism with Ates which even she doesn’t realise. She is not fond of middle class people and rather her sons marry to their own status people.

Gizem Sevim as Aleyna

- Feraye’s older self-centred stepsister who is in love with Yaman. After her mother blackmailed Yaman, Aleyna marries Yaman and becomes the daughter in law of the Gülsoy family despite knowing her husband doesn’t love her.

Can Bartu Aslan as Okan Gülsoy

- Youngest son of the Gülsoy children. Okan is a happy, go lucky boy who is extremely close to his older brothers especially Yaman who has always been by his side after Ates left for America for many years thus Okan always sides with him. He gets involved in a dangerous scuffle of Yaman and Bora and Okan in order to protect his brother, harms Bora and his life is never the same again.

Nur Yazar as Cemile Yilmaz

- Feraye’s greedy and selfish stepmother who disapproves of her and Yaman’s relationship since the beginning as she knows her daughter loves the same man. She blackmails Yaman in marrying her daughter, Aleyna.

Müfit Kayacan as Ömer Gülsoy

- Matriarch of Gülsoy family and grandfather of the Ates, Yaman and Okan. Gülfem’s father in law. He is a strict and hardworking businesswoman who retires and wants his grandchildren to take over the company. He is very close to Yaman but has a strained relationship with his oldest grandson, Ates.

Münir Can Cindoruk as Çetin Yilmaz

- Feraye’s older brother and Nesrin’s husband. He is protective but strict to his sister. He also has a greedy side and always wanted a wealthy life. He is happy when Feraye marries into a rich family.

Sevda Bas as Nesrin Yilmaz

- Cetin’s wife and Feraye’s loving sister in law. Unlike her husband, she isn’t greedy for the rich lifestyle and has a close relationship with Feraye and has always known and supported Feraye and Yaman’s love.

Ilda Ozgürel as Hazal

- Feraye’s best friend and support system. She stays by Feraye’s side through everything and Feraye shares all her secrets with her. Hazal later begins a relationship with Okan. Along with Okan, they were the only ones who knew of Yaman and Feraye’s love and supported them.

Serdan Bordanaci as Muhsin Yilmaz

- Feraye’s handicapped father and Cemile’s husband. He loves his daughter a lot and sticks by her.

Erkan Bektaş as Vural Bakircioglu

- A wealthy, hard businessman and frenemies with the Gülsoy family. He is involved in criminal activities and has two children but it is later revealed he was in a relationship with Gulfem and Ates is his biological son and actually not the son of the Gülsoys.

Efe Tasdelen as Bora Bakircioglu

- Vural’s son and Bade’s brother. He is a cunning and criminal man who was the root cause of the big blackmailing drama. He gets involved in a fight with Yaman in which Yaman’s brother, Okan in order to protect him endangers Bora.

Selin Isik as Bade Bakircioglu

- Vural’s daughter, Bora’s sister and Ates’s half sister. She falls in love with Ates before finding out he’s her half brother. The two families wanted her and Ates to marry but Ates married Feraye instead.

Gizem Karaca as Günes

- Bade’s friend who later becomes Ates’s love interest.

== Episodes ==
No.	Title	Directed by	Written by	Original release date
1	"If you fight with fate, it will fight with you!"	Semih Bağcı	Unknown	4 September 2023
2	"Feraye is in a difficult situation"	Semih Bağcı	Unknown	11 September 2023
3	"The only way is to escape"	Semih Bağcı	Unknown	18 September 2023
4	"Will love win?"	Semih Bağcı	Unknown	25 September 2023
5	"Feraye is in a difficult situation."	Semih Bağcı	Unknown	2 October 2023
6	"Feraye is looking for an escape route."	Semih Bağcı	Unknown	9 October 2023
7	"Tension is increasing!"	Semih Bağcı	Unknown	16 October 2023
8	"The rush to learn the truth is increasing."	Semih Bağcı	Unknown	23 October 2023
9	"Dangerous plan"	Semih Bağcı	Unknown	30 October 2023
10	TBA	Semih Bağcı	Unknown	6 November 2023

== Production ==
The project was announced in August 2023 by ATV and produced by NTC Medya. The show's writers are Gül Abus Semerci and Burcu Över, with direction by Semih Bağcı and production oversight by Mehmet Yiğit Alp. Safir, in English known as A Hidden Love Story, stars İlhan Şen, Özge Yağız, and Burak Berkay Akgül in the lead roles.

Filming took place in Cappadocia, Turkey.

== See also ==
- Television in Turkey
- List of Turkish television series
- Turkish television drama
