= Zerrin Tekindor =

Turkish actress and painter (born 1964)

- Born: 5 August 1964 (age 61); Burhaniye, Balıkesir, Turkey
- Occupations: Actress, painter
- Spouse: Çetin Tekindor (m. 1987; div. 1999)
- Children: 1

Zerrin Tekindor (born 5 August 1964) is a Turkish actress and painter.

== Biography ==
In 1985 she graduated from the Hacettepe University State Conservatory, School of Theater. In that year, she began to work at the Adana State Theatre as an intern. After two years she was charged with a duty in Ankara at the State Theatre and performed in numerous plays such as: Laundry, Ferhad and Sirin, A Noisy and Clamorous Story, Death, Istanbul Efendisi, Last of the Red Hot Lovers, Skylight, From War to Peace, From Love to Quarrel, Love Kills, The Government Inspector, A Place in the Middle of the Earth. In 2003 she moved to Istanbul to work at the Istanbul State Theatre. In 2004 she performed in The Government Inspector (N. V. Gogol) as Anna Andreyevna. She won an Afife Theatre Award for Best Supporting Actress in Comedy.

Besides her theatre career, Zerrin Tekindor also studied painting as a special student at the Bilkent University School of Fine Arts between 1990-1994 in the Halil Akdeniz Workshop. The heroes of many plays are settled on her canvas as Tekindor's figures by using mixed technique. With their costumes, actions, lines, and even with their appearances under the stage light, they become paintings, being filtered through Tekindor's interpretation who is also part of that particular action on the stage.

Zerrin Tekindor has a son with actor Çetin Tekindor. At present, Zerrin Tekindor continues her career as an actress and a painter in Istanbul. Since 1992, she has held nineteen personal exhibitions.

== Theatre ==
- Death of a Salesman : Arthur Miller - Rufus Norris - Zorlu PSM, 2026
- A Streetcar Named Desire : Tennessee Williams - ID İletişim & BKM - 2017
- Who's Afraid of Virginia Woolf? : Edward Albee - Oyun Atölyesi - 2013
- Antony and Cleopatra : William Shakespeare - Oyun Atölyesi & Shakespeare's Globe - 2012
- God of Carnage : Yasmina Reza - Istanbul State Theatre - 2009
- Dünyanın Ortasında Bir Yer : Özen Yula - Istanbul State Theatre - 2007
- The Government Inspector : Nikolai Gogol - Istanbul State Theatre - 2003
- Love Kills : Vladimir Volkoff -Ankara State Theatre - 1999
- Savaştan Barışa, Aşktan Kavgaya : Recep Bilginer - Ankara State Theatre - 1999
- Geyikler Lanetler : Murathan Mungan - Ankara State Theatre - 1999
- Skylight : David Hare - Ankara State Theatre - 1997
- İstanbul Efendisi : Musahipzade Celal - Ankara State Theatre - 1995
- Last of the Red Hot Lovers : Neil Simon - Ankara State Theatre - 1995
- Death : Woody Allen - Ankara State Theatre - 1994
- İstanbul Efendisi : Musahipzade Celal - Ankara State Theatre - 1993
- Gürültülü Patırtılı Bir Hikaye : Savaş Dinçel - Ankara State Theatre - 1993
- Ferhat ile Şirin : Nâzım Hikmet - Ankara State Theatre - 1992
- Laundry : D. Durvin\H. Prevest - Ankara State Theatre - 1991
- Woman in Mind : Alan Ayckbourn - Ankara State Theatre - 1987

== Filmography ==
=== TV series ===
- Cafe Casablanka
- Mars Kapıdan Baktırır
- Aşk-ı Memnu, Mademoiselle Deniz de Courton - 2008–2010
- Yaprak Dökümü, Gişe Memuru (guest appearance) - 2010
- Kuzey Güney, Gülten Çayak - 2011–2013
- Kurt Seyit ve Şura, Yazar - 2014
- Kara Sevda, Leyla Acemzade - 2015–2017
- Şahin Tepesi, Tuna Akdora - 2018
- Zemheri, Aliye Pınar - 2020
- Mucize Doktor, Vuslat Kosoğlu - 2021
- Between the World and Us - Burçin - 2022
- Yüz Yıllık Mucize - Süreyya - 2023
- Ben Onun Annesiyim - Suna - 2025

=== Film ===
- Pek Yakında - 2014
- İkimizin Yerine - 2016
- İstanbul Kırmızısı - 2017
- Müslüm - 2018
- Three Thousand Years of Longing - 2022
