= Leyla: Hayat... Aşk... Adalet... =

- Genre: Drama; Psychological thriller
- Based on: Avenida Brasil by João Emanuel Carneiro
- Developed by: Gökhan Horzum
- Written by: Yılmaz Şahin; Gökhan Horzum; Nükhet Bıçakçı; Su Ersöz
- Directed by: Hilal Saral
- Starring: Cemre Baysel; Gonca Vuslateri; Yiğit Kirazcı
- Composer: Toygar Işıklı
- Country of origin: Turkey
- Original language: Turkish
- No. of seasons: 1
- No. of episodes: 40

Production
- Executive producer: Kerem Çatay
- Production company: Ay Yapım

Original release
- Network: Now
- Release: 11 September 2024 – 22 June 2025

Leyla: Hayat... Aşk... Adalet... (also simply known as Leyla) is a Turkish drama television series developed by Gökhan Horzum. It is based on the 2012 Brazilian telenovela Avenida Brasil, created by João Emanuel Carneiro. The series premiered on Now on 11 September 2024. It stars Cemre Baysel, Gonca Vuslateri and Yiğit Kirazcı.

== Plot ==
Young Leyla's life falls apart when her father, Hilmi, marries Nur, a beautiful young woman who once cared for her late mother. Blinded by love, Hilmi fails to see the torment Leyla's new stepmother inflicts, turning their home into a nightmare. Tragically, Hilmi realizes too late that Nur is not who she seems, and he pays for his mistake with his life. Homeless and alone, Leyla vows revenge on the woman who destroyed her family and stole her life.

Years later, Leyla returns disguised as Ela, a talented chef hired by Nur, who now lives in luxury with her new partner, former football star Tufo. However, things get complicated when Leyla's childhood sweetheart, Cino, reappears in her life as Civan, Nur's adopted son. As Leyla's thirst for revenge clashes with her renewed feelings for Civan, long-buried family secrets resurface, forcing everyone to confront the remnants of their past.

== Cast ==
- Cemre Baysel as Leyla Yılmaz / Ela Karaca
  - Melisa Duru Ünal as chile Leyla
- Gonca Vuslateri as Nurgül "Nur" Yıldız/Köroğlu/Ertaş
  - Eylül Uğuz as child Nur
- Yiğit Kirazcı as Mehmet Ali "Mali" Ertaş
  - Mustafa Can Savaş as child Mali
- Mustafa Avkıran as Necmeddin "Neco" Ertaş
- Alperen Duymaz as Civan Yıldız
  - Ayaz Gülşen as child Cino / Civan
- Halil İbrahim Ceyhan as Tufan "Tufo" Yıldız
- Cengiz Bozkurt as Selman Yıldız
- Zeyno Eracar as Güzide "Kader" Ertaş
- Meltem Baytok as Hatice Yıldız
- Seda Güven as Arzu Ersoy
- Gamze Karaduman (episodes 1–11) / Buse Sinem İren (episodes 14–35) as Ferda Yıldız Ertaş
- Dilara Aksüyek as Serap Çimen
- Berfin Ant as Ceren Ersoy
- Murat Serezli as Melih Ersoy
- Yiğit Oruçoğlu as Kürşat
  - Yasin Yamanol as child Kürşat
- Meltem Pamirtan as Sema Karaca
- Lilya İrem Salman as Fidan
- Hande Subaşı as Tuana
- Levent Meşe as Yılmaz Sönmez
- Iraz Yöntem as Feza
- Selçuk Yöntem as Vedat Köroğlu
- Tuğrul Tülek as Suat Köroğlu
- Aslı Orcan as Firdevs Köroğlu
- Burcu Cavrar as Dilara Köroğlu
- Gülper Özdemir as Ahsen Köroğlu Demir
- Emre Taşkıran as Murat Demir
- Berk Bakioğlu as Eren Yıldırım

=== Guest stars ===
- Ertan Ekmekçi as Rasim Afyonlu
- Aydan Kaya as Fazilet "Okşan"
- Günay Karacaoğlu as Nermin
- Uğur Aslan as Hilmi Yilmaz
- Bulut Akkale as Tekin
- Veda Yurtsever as Handan Yıldırım
- Ilgın Çakır as Umay Coşkun
- Murat Ercanlı as Rauf

== Production ==
On 17 October 2023, it was announced that Globo had sold the adaptation rights to the telenovela Avenida Brasil to the Turkish production company Ay Yapım, to produce the first international adaptation of the series. The partnership allows Ay Yapım to make some changes, as long as they remain faithful to the main plot of the series. Estúdios Globo is involved as a consultant. On 19 May 2024, it was announced that Hilal Saral had been chosen to direct the adaptation, provisionally titled Hayat Hırsızı (Life Thief). Filming of the series began on 21 July 2024.
