= Ayça Ayşin Turan =

Turkish actress (born 1992)

- Born: 25 October 1992 (age 33); Sinop, Turkey
- Education: Istanbul University
- Occupation: Actress
- Years active: 2011–present
- Partner: Alp Navruz
- Awards: 2021 Best Romantic & Comedy Actress – Golden Butterfly Awards

Ayça Ayşin Turan (Turkish pronunciation: [ɑjˈtʃɑ ajʃin tuɾɑn]; born 25 October 1992) is a Turkish actress best known for her roles in Meryem, Arıza, and Ada Masalı, for which she won a Golden Butterfly Award.

== Early life ==
Turan's mother is from the city of Sinop. Her maternal family immigrated from Selânik (present-day Thessaloniki, Greece) to mainland Turkey after the Greek conquest of the city when the Ottoman Empire collapsed. Her father is from Kastamonu. She is the youngest of seven siblings (five boys and two girls).

Turan became interested in acting and violin at a young age. She later studied film at the Department of Radio, TV and Cinema, Faculty of Communication, Istanbul University.

== Filmography ==
=== Television ===
List of film appearances, with year, title, and role shown
Year	Title	Role	Notes
2011–2012	Dinle Sevgili	Gülfem	
2013–2016	Karagül	Ada Şamverdi	
2016	Altınsoylar	Burcu Kapan	
2017–2018	Meryem	Meryem Akça	
2018–2020	Hakan: Muhafız	Leyla Sancak	
2020	Zemheri	Firuze Pınar	
2020–2021	Arıza	Halide Gürkan	
2021	Menajerimi Ara	Herself	Guest appearance
2021	Ada Masalı	Haziran Sedefli	
2023	Kader Bağları	Sevda Güneş	

=== Film ===
List of film appearances, with year, title, and role shown
Year	Title	Role	Notes
2015	Sevimli Tehlikeli	Zeliş	
2023	Sen İnandır	Sahra	
2024	Sevmek Yüzünden	İdil	
2024	39 Derecede Aşk	Av. Kumru Tanyas	
TBA	Al Beni Baba	Nazlı	
