= Burcu Özberk =

Turkish actress (born 1989)

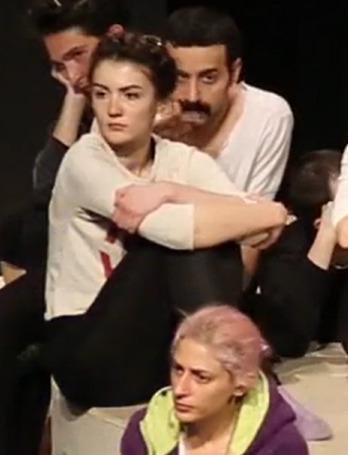
- Born: 11 December 1989 (age 36); Eskişehir, Turkey
- Education: Hacettepe University
- Occupation: Actress
- Years active: 2012–present

Burcu Özberk (born 11 December 1989) is a Turkish actress. She has received a Golden Butterfly Award for Best Actress in a Romantic Comedy in 2020 for her role in Afili Aşk. She also played Esra Erten Korfalı in the TV serie Aşk Mantık İntikam (Love, Reason, Revenge) between 2021–2022.

== Career ==
Her sister is a violinist. Also, Burcu Özberk left to study violin at the State Conservatory's Music Department for elementary school. She graduated from the theater department of Hacettepe University State Conservatory.

Her television debut in 2013, in the historical series Muhteşem Yüzyıl and played the character of Huricihan Sultan. Her breakthrough came with her role as Nazlı Yılmaz in youth series Güneşin Kızları. She made her cinematic debut with the historical movie Direniş Karatay who won Türkiye Gençlik Best Actress Award. She also had parts in several plays at Erdal Beşikçioğlu's Tatbikat Stage, including Quills and Woyzeck.

She had a leading role in romantic comedy series Şahane Damat. Between 2017 and 2018, she played simultaneously in the comedy series Aslan Ailem and the TV film Badem Şekeri. She later had a leading role in Kanal D's romantic comedy series Afili Aşk, for which she won a Golden Butterfly Award as the Best Romantic Comedy Actress. She then played in the drama series Çocukluk with Erdal Beşikçioğlu. She co-starred with İlhan Şen in Fox Turkey's romantic comedy Aşk Mantık İntikam.

== Theater ==
- Aşk Aptalı
- Woyzeck Masalı
- Marquis de Sade
- The Philistines
- Ayyar Hamza
- Kuş Bakışı Kabare
- Macbeth Abla
- Little Red Riding Hood and Her Friends

== Filmography ==
=== Television ===
Year	Title	Role	Notes
2013–2014	Muhteşem Yüzyıl	Huricihan Sultan	Supporting role
2015–2016	Güneşin Kızları	Nazlı Yılmaz	Leading role
2016	Şahane Damat	Melike Sağlam	Leading role
2017–2018	Aslan Ailem	Burcu Olgun	Leading role
2019–2020	Afili Aşk	Ayşe Özkayalı Yiğiter	Leading role
2020	Çocukluk	Ayşegül Esen	Leading role
2021–2022	Aşk Mantık İntikam	Esra Erten Korfalı	Leading role
2022	Maske Kimsin Sen?	Deer	Contestant
2023	Kraliçe	Deniz Gencer Akça	Leading role
2023	Ruhun Duymaz	Ece Çetinel	Leading role
2025	Prens	Princess Vivian	Guest role
2025–	Son Kare	Sare Baykal	Leading role
2026–	Anne Yarısı	Zeynep Aksoy	Leading role

=== Film ===
Year	Title	Role	Notes
2017	Badem Şekeri	Ayşe Sarılar	Leading role, TV film
2018	Direniş Karatay	Türkan Hatun	Leading role
2023	Rüyanda Görürsün	Pelin	Leading role, Amazon Prime
