= Günay Karacaoğlu =

Turkish actress

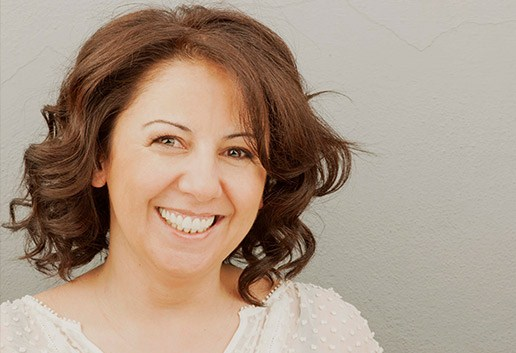
- Karacaoğlu in 2016
- Born: 13 March 1971 (age 55); Kayseri, Turkey
- Occupation: Actress
- Years active: 1994–present
- Spouses: Şevket Çoruh (m. 1993; div. 2004): Cengiz Çağatay (div.)
- Children: Gülenay Çoruh

Günay Karacaoğlu (born 13 March 1971) is a Turkish actress. She is known for hit comedy series "Yarım Elma" and period parody films "Kahpe Bizans", "Dede Korkut Hikayeleri: Deli Dumrul".

Karacaoğlu was born on 13 March 1971 in Kayseri as the third child of her family. She moved with her family to Istanbul in 1976. During her high school years, she participated in a theatre festival where she was awarded as the Best Actress. In 1991, she enrolled in the Müjdat Gezen Art Center and graduated in 1995.

Karacaoğlu made her debut as an actress in 1994 with a recurring role in the hit series "Şehnaz Tango" and "Yeditepe İstanbul". She played for her role in the series "Gönülçelen" and "20 Dakika" in which she starred alongside Tuba Büyüküstün for twice. An award-winning stage actress, Karacaoğlu went on stage in a one-woman show titled Aşk Ölsün in 2019. In 2021, she was cast in the romantic comedy Aşk Mantık İntikam.

== Filmography ==
- Leyla: Hayat... Aşk... Adalet... (TV series) 2024 Nermin
- Sevda Mecburi İstikamet (Film) 2023 Fatoş
- Evlat Olsa Sevilmez (Film) 2022
- Aşk Mantık İntikam (TV series) 2021–2022 Zümrüt
- Gençliğim Eyvah (TV series) 2020 Hacer Asmalı
- Hayati ve Diğerleri (TV series) 2017–2018
- Dede Korkut Hikayeleri: Deli Dumrul (Film) 2017
- Cingöz Recai: Bir Efsanenin Dönüşü (Film) 2017
- Yaşamak Güzel Şey (Film) 2017
- Roman Havası (TV series) 2014 Elmas
- Avrupa Avrupa (TV series) 2013 Saadet Gürleyen
- 20 Dakika (TV series) 2013 Akrep
- İstanbulun Altınları (TV series) 2011 Uğur
- Gönülçelen (TV series) 2010 Gülnaz
- Bana Bunlarla Gel (TV series) 2010
- Aşkım Aşkım (TV series) 2008 Hadise (episode 13)
- Osmanlı Cumhuriyeti 2008 Florist
- Hemşire Meri (TV series) 2008 Meri
- Düş Yakamdan (TV series) 2007 Şahane
- Dünyayı Kurtaran Adamın Oğlu 2006 Teorik Tuğçe
- Kısmet (TV series) 2005 Kısmet
- Hayat Bilgisi (TV series) 2003 Hediye
- İnşaat 2003 TV presenter
- Bayanlar Baylar (TV series) 2002 Zakkum
- Yarım Elma (TV series) 2002 Gonca
- Beşibiryerde (TV series) 2002
- Bizim Otel (TV series) 2001 Naciye
- Yeditepe İstanbul (TV series) 2001 Önem
- Abuzer Kadayıf 2000 Yazgülü
- Üzgünüm Leyla (TV series) 2000
- Kahpe Bizans 1999 Anaç Hatun
- Hayvanlara Dokunduk (TV series) 1997 Fatma
- Köşe Kapmaca (TV series) 1996 Handan
- Şehnaz Tango (TV series) 1994 Hasene

== Awards ==
- 2009: Muhsin Ertuğrul Theatre Awards, "Best Actress in a Comedy Role"
- 2009: Sadri Alışık Theatre Awards, "Best Actress in a Comedy Role"
- 2009: Afife Jale Theatre Awards, "Best Actress in a Comedy Role"
- 2018: XVIII. Direct Audience Awards, "Best Comedy Actress", Artiz Mektebi, Müjdat Gezen Theatre
