= Kader Bağları =

Turkish TV series

- Genre: Drama
- Written by: Sema Ali Erol; Mahir Erol; Türküler Özgül; Redife Zerener
- Directed by: Benal Tairi (1–4); Ersoy Güler (5)
- Starring: Serkan Çayoğlu; Ayça Ayşin Turan
- Composer: Barış Aryay
- Country of origin: Turkey
- Original language: Turkish
- No. of seasons: 1
- No. of episodes: 5

Production
- Producers: Ali Gündoğdu; İsmail Gündoğdu
- Production locations: Istanbul; Ildır; İzmir; Montenegro
- Running time: 135 minutes
- Production company: Süreç Film

Original release
- Network: FOX
- Release: September 30 – October 28, 2023

Kader Bağları, also known as Grapes of Love, is a Turkish television series in the drama genre produced by Süreç Film. Its first episode was broadcast on September 30, 2023, and it is directed by Benal Tairi and Ersoy Güler. The screenplay is written by Sema Ali Erol, Mahir Erol, Türküler Özgül Akad, and Redife Zerener. The series stars Serkan Çayoğlu and Ayça Ayşin Turan in the leading roles. The series will conclude with its 5th episode, which will be aired on October 28, 2023.

== Plot ==
Kerem, a successful heir to a renowned winemaking family, meets Sevda, a law student on an Erasmus program, during a magical day at his family's Montenegro vineyard. They agree to meet again a year later but fate brings them together unexpectedly in Istanbul. Sevda, working as a maid in Kerem's prestigious family's home, faces class differences and opposition from Kerem's family. Their love is undeniable, and they're determined to overcome obstacles and live their love without limits.

== Production ==
=== Filmed ===
The TV series "Kader Bağları" was filmed in Izmir, Turkey. While the initial episodes were shot in the Çeşme district of Izmir, it is expected that the main filming location changed after the summer scenes. Additionally, some scenes of "Kader Bağları" were also filmed in Ildır, Izmir.

== Cast and characters ==
Actor	Character	Episode
Serkan Çayoğlu	Kerem Sipahioğlu	1-
Ayça Ayşin Turan	Sevda Güneş	1-
Arzu Gamze Kılınç	Nüzhet Sipahioğlu	1-
Betül Çobanoğlu	Perihan Korkmaz	1-
Alptekin Serdengeçti	Vedat Sipahioğlu	1-4
Zeynep Köse	Fevziye Sipahioğlu	1-
Mehmet Aykaç	Savaş Tanyürek	1-
Nazlı Bulum	Aliye Sipahioğlu	1-
Yusuf Akgün	Halil	1-
Aslı İçözü	Dilber	1-
Sanem Babi	Rana Hanoğlu	1-
Tolga İskit	Selim Karagöz	1-
Fulya Ülvan		1-
Mete Ayhan		1-
Müşerref Göksever		1-
Şule Zeyren		1-
Timur Ölkebaş		1-2
Ayhan Kızılsu		1-
Çınar Yükçeker		1-
Sinan Albayrak	Teoman	3-

== Episodes ==
=== Season 1 (2023) ===
Episode	Director	Writers	Air Date
Episode 1	Benal Tairi	Sema Ali Erol, Mahir Erol, Türküler Özgül, Redife Zerener	September 30, 2023
Episode 2	Benal Tairi	Sema Ali Erol, Mahir Erol, Türküler Özgül, Redife Zerener	October 7, 2023
Episode 3	Benal Tairi	Sema Ali Erol, Mahir Erol, Türküler Özgül, Redife Zerener	October 14, 2023
Episode 4	Benal Tairi	Sema Ali Erol, Mahir Erol, Türküler Özgül, Redife Zerener	October 21, 2023
Episode 5 (Final)	Ersoy Güler	Sema Ali Erol, Mahir Erol, Türküler Özgül, Redife Zerener	October 28, 2023

== Viewership ratings ==
Episode	Air Date	Rating (TOTAL)	Rank (TOTAL)	Rating (AB)	Rank (AB)	Rating (ABC1)	Rank (ABC1)
Episode 1	September 30, 2023	2.42	8.	1.91	7.	2.60	7.
Episode 2	October 7, 2023	2.61	7.	1.79	8.	2.53	6.
Episode 3	October 14, 2023	2.70	9.	1.89	10.	2.49	10.
Episode 4	October 21, 2023	2.01	10.	1.26	9.	2.03	7.
Episode 5 (Final)	October 28, 2023						

== See also ==
- Television in Turkey
- List of Turkish television series
- Turkish television drama
