= Love, Reason, Get Even =

Turkish drama and romantic comedy television series

- Turkish: Aşk Mantık İntikam
- Genre: romantic comedy drama
- Based on: Cunning Single Lady
- Creative directors: Murat Öztürk (1-4, 7-); Koray Kerimoğlu (5-6)
- Starring: Burcu Özberk; İlhan Şen
- Voices of: Pelin Çubukçu
- Music by: Batuhan Fırat (1-); Mustafa Güzel (4-)
- Composer: Mustafa Erten
- Country of origin: Turkey
- Original language: Turkish
- No. of seasons: 1
- No. of episodes: 42

Production
- Executive producer: Yağmur Ünal
- Running time: 120 Minutes
- Production company: No:9 Productions

Original release
- Network: Fox
- Release: 18 June 2021 – 22 April 2022

Aşk Mantık İntikam (litt. Love Logic Revenge) is a Turkish drama and romantic comedy television series produced by No:9 Productions. Based on South Korean Cunning Single Lady, the series premiered on 18 June 2021, concluded on April 22, 2022 and stars Burcu Özberk, İlhan Şen, Burak Yörük and Melisa Döngel.

== Plot ==
While Esra thinks she wakes up in one of her usual mornings, she suddenly finds herself surrounded by Ozan's news, his appearance on television, and his huge pictures on billboards. Her ex-husband Ozan, whom she divorced two years ago, is everywhere. He has also changed a lot. Ozan, who shot a penny when Esra quit, has become a completely different person. He is very successful, very handsome and very rich. While her life changed thanks to the social media application that Ozan found, Esra stood still. Before Esra can get over her shock, she comes face to face with Ozan. But Ozan, who used to love Esra enough to die, is no longer in front of her. He is a cold, arrogant man, full of anger towards Esra.

This encounter activates the feelings that they both think are over. Oddly enough, they both remember different things when they think about their marriage. For Esra, marriage means a safe haven. Esra, who had a childhood full of bankruptcies and foreclosures due to her father's adventurous business life, witnessed how hard her mother, who was in love with her father, tried to keep this family alive. Esra, who thinks that if this is love, I don't exist, is determined to marry someone who loves and trusts her very much. Ozan fell in love with Esra at first sight. As soon as Esra sees Ozan, she realizes that he is the person she is looking for and they get married in a short time. However, when Ozan resigns from his regular job to be able to do the job of his dreams, Esra's safe harbor is suddenly destroyed. Since Ozan cannot find an investor for his creative ideas, the living of the house is left entirely to Esra. Esra starts working multiple jobs to pay the rent and bills. Esra, who made a logical marriage in order not to be like her mother, has fallen into a worse state than her mother. Although she tries to keep their marriage alive for a while, she finally gives up. But in fact, the reasons for separation for both are not what they seem.

On the evening of the day they met, Esra tells her friend Zeyno that she expects an apology from Ozan for her past experiences, while Ozan angrily tells his assistant Musa how Esra easily sacrificed him in time. But what neither of them realize is how impressed they are when they see each other.

The next day, Esra gets dressed and goes to Ozan's office, thinking that Ozan will apologize for what he has done in the past and want to reconcile with the phone call from Ozan. However, Ozan's intention is different. Ozan, who could not give alimony to Esra because he had no money at the time of the divorce, takes out an envelope full of money and puts it in front of Esra. His real intention is to hurt Esra, who he thinks left him for money, by teaching her a good lesson. Realizing that she was being summoned to be humiliated, Esra tore up the envelope and left with Ozan even more angry than before.

Now it's Esra's turn to mend her broken pride. Seeing Ozan's company's trainee announcement, Esra makes her plan. She will apply to Ozan's company by applying for the advertisement and will leave his life only when Ozan falls in love with her again and falls at her feet.

== Cast ==
=== Main characters ===
Actor	Episodes	Role
Burcu Özberk	1-42	Esra Erten Korfalı, Menekşe and Yalçın's daughter, Ozan´s wife, Ekrem´s sister, Elif´s sister-in-law
İlhan Şen	1-42	Ozan Korfalı, Zümrüt´s son, Esra´s husband, Ekrem´s brother-in-law, Menekşe and Yalçın's son-in-law
Zeynep Kankonde	1-42	Menekşe Erten, Esra and Ekrem´s mother, Ozan and Elif´s mother-in-law, Yalçın's wife
Günay Karacaoğlu	1-42	Zümrüt Korfalı, Ozan and Elif´s mother, Esra and Ekrem´s mother-in-law
Süleyman Atanısev	1-29, 31-42	Yalçın Erten, Esra and Ekrem´s dad, Elif and Ozan´s father-in-law
Mehmet Korhan Fırat	1-42	Ekrem Erten, Esra's brother, Elif´s husband, Menekşe and Yalçın's son, Ozan´s brother-in-law
Ceren Koç	1-42	Elif Korfalı Erten, Ozan's sister, Ekrem´s wife, daughter of Zümrüt, Menekşe and Yalçın's daughter-in-law, Esra´s sister-in-law
Emir Güler	24-42	Atlas Korfalı, Esra and Ozan's son, Menekşe, Yalçın and Zümrüt's grandson, nephew of Elif and Ekrem
Sevda Baş	1-27, 29-42	Zeynep (Zeyno), Esra's best friend, Musa´s wife
Mehmet Yilmaz	1-42	Musa, Ozan's best friend, Zeynep´s husband
Burak Yörük	1-28	Çınar Yılmaz, Ozan's enemy, Esra's ex-husband, Çagla's Twin brother
Melisa Döngel	1-28	Çağla Yılmaz, Esra's enemy, Ozan's ex-wife, Çınar's Twin Sister

=== Supporting characters ===
Actor	Role	Episodes
Günay Karacaoğlu	Zümrüt Korfalı	1-42
Zeynep Kankonde	Menekşe Erten	1-42
Mehmet Korhan Fırat	Ekrem Erten (Eko)	1-42
Süleyman Atanısev	Yalçın Erten	1-29, 31-42
Mehmet Yılmaz	Musa	1-42
Ceren Koç	Elif Korfalı Erten	1-42
Erdem Şanlı	Barış	29-33
Sevda Baş	Zeynep (Zeyno)	1-18, 20-27, 29-38, 40-42
Cem Belevi	Efe Sayanoğlu	30-37
Sebahat Kumaş	Rüya	28-33
Gözde Duru	Gaye	1-9, 11-23, 26-29, 32, 37, 42
Pelin Budak	Neriman	1-12, 18, 20, 23, 27-28, 31-34, 36-38, 40, 42
Elçin Atamgüç	Nilgün	28-29, 32
Emir Güler	Atlas Korfalı	24-42

=== Guest characters ===
Actor	Role	Episodes
İsmail Düvenci	Rükneddin	27
Cihat Tamer	Faruk Korfalı	26-27
Sinan Sicimoğlu	Sinan	24-27
Yusuf Akgün	Mert Balkır	14-23, 27-28
Nazan Diper	Havva	8

=== Departed characters ===
Actor	Role	Episodes
Nilgün Türksever	Hande Yılmaz	12-15
Sibel Şişman	Feraye	1-13, 15
Birgül Ulusoy	Reyhan	1-16
Murat Karasu	Arif Yılmaz	1-2, 5, 7-15, 18-25, 27
Saadet Melek Sözan	Ela Balkır	24-28
Anıl Altan	Ayaz Karakoç	25-28
Burak Yörük	Çınar Yılmaz	1-28
Melisa Döngel	Çağla Yılmaz	1-28

== Production ==
Aşk Mantık İntikam is based on South Korean TV series Cunning Single Lady, which aired in 2014. The episodes are written by Özlem İnci Hekimoğlu and Nil Güleç Ünsal. The shooting of the series takes place in Istanbul.

== Broadcast ==
The new episodes of the series are broadcast on FOX Turkey every Friday at 20:00 local time.

== Criticism ==
In an interview with Turkish fundamentalist Islamic newspaper Yeni Akit on 26 November 2021, Birgül Ulusoy, who played the character Reyhan, said that certain directors and producers were "give[n] preferential treatment." The newspaper itself called the series and other productions made by FOX Turkey "immoral".
