= Ada Masalı =

Turkish television series

- Genre: Drama; Romantic comedy
- Written by: Yelda Eroğlu; Yeşim Çıtak; Emine Yıldırım; Dilek İyigün; Aksel Bonfil
- Directed by: Ali Bilgin; Özgür Sevimli
- Starring: Ayça Ayşin Turan; Alp Navruz
- Theme music composer: Buray
- Opening theme: "Çift Gökkuşağı" by Buray
- Composer: Cem Öget
- Country of origin: Turkey
- Original language: Turkish
- No. of seasons: 1
- No. of episodes: 25

Production
- Executive producer: Kerem Çatay
- Cinematography: Ümit Gabin
- Production company: Ay Yapım

Original release
- Network: Star TV
- Release: 15 June – 11 December 2021

Ada Masalı (English title: Be My Sunshine) is a Turkish drama television series produced by Ay Yapım. It aired on Star TV from 15 June 2021 to 11 December 2021. The series stars Ayça Ayşin Turan and Alp Navruz.

== Plot ==
Haziran is a city girl who loves the Istanbul lifestyle. She's also a natural-born worker and the daughter of a well-known fashion designer who's fallen on hard times. Her hectic life takes a dramatic turn when the company she works for asks her to travel to an exotic island to carry out an important mission: to gather information to pressure Poyraz into selling his land so a resort can be built. Poyraz, who has taken out a loan to keep his business afloat, refuses to sell. Haziran carries out her task without realizing how she was harming Poyraz, so when she realizes what she has done, she tries to help him. Day by day, amid comical situations and charming islanders, Haziran discovers that her lifestyle differs greatly from that of Poyraz, a man born on the peaceful island; but once there, love and the island itself will completely change her life.

== Cast ==
- Ayça Ayşin Turan as Haziran Sedefli
- Alp Navruz as Poyraz Ali Özgür
- Nihan Büyükağaç as Selma Göknar Kahraman
- Bülent Çolak as Görkem
- Bedia Ener as Aliye Özgür
- İpek Tenolcay as Zeynep Göknar Sağlam
- İlkay Akdağlı as Başkan Latif Sağlam
- Rami Narin as Alper Bulut
- Özge Demirtel as Biricik Atakan
- Merve Nur Bengi as Melisa Ayen Bulut
- Fatih Yücebağ as Sadık Kahraman
- Eylül Ersöz as Nehir Demirer
- Fatih Altun as Beyazıt
- Mustafa Aran as Burak
- Ümmü Putgül as Suzan
- Hasan Say as Okan
- Cem Anıl Kenar as Hakan
- Efe Adabaş as Ateş Atakan
- Mesut Özkeçeci as Doygun
- Erdem Kaynarca as Batu Nemranlı
- Beril Pozam as İdil Sağlam
- Bensu Begoviç as Duygu
- Yusuf Atala as Sinan
