= Rüya (TV series) =

Turkish family romance series

- Genre: Drama
- Starring: Hazal Filiz Küçükköse; Ceyhun Mengiroglu
- Country of origin: Turkey
- Original language: Turkish
- No. of seasons: 1
- No. of episodes: 10

Production
- Production location: Istanbul
- Running time: 120 - 130 minutes
- Production company: Gold

Original release
- Network: Show TV
- Release: 18 July – 24 September 2017

Rüya (English title: Dream) is a Turkish family romance drama that was broadcast on Show TV from the 18 July 2017 to 24 September 2017.

== Plot ==
Elif is an ordinary girl from a middle-class family who works as a clerk in one of the clothing shops owned by the Giray family. Bulut Giray is the son of Ruhsan and Cihan Giray. Elif meets Bulut at a function that was hosted by the Giray family and Elif's friend Yildiz Akarsu lies about them being sisters and Elif being a stylist who considers starting her own company and lies about them working as saleswomen.

Elif's stepmother plans to marry Elif off to an older man in exchange for a flat. Bulut finds out Elif and Yildiz's lies. Gulendam (Elif's stepmother) pitches to Faysal (Elif's father) that Elif should marry Hakki (An old man who owns flats) and Faysal gets disgusted by it and tells Gulendam to forget about it, but later sees the news that his daughter was at an event. They decide that Elif will be married off to Hakki.

Yildiz tells Bulut to save Elif because she will be married off, and gives Bulut a piece of paper with the address of Elif's home. Before being married off, Bulut arrives in time and Elif agrees to leave with him. The series continues with Elif and Bulut falling in love with each other and all the troubles they occur on the way, when its revealed that Alaz is Bulut's brother. Alaz sets out to destroy Elif and Bulut's relationship.

== Cast ==
Actor	Role	Notes
Hazal Filiz Küçükköse	Elif Ardali	Main
Ceyhun Mengiroglu	Bulut Giray	Main
Özge Özder	Ruhsan Giray	Main
Ulaş Tuna Astepe	Alaz Noyan	Main
Ozge Sezince Varley	Gulendam	Main
Buse Varol	Girlfriend	Main
Goncagul Sunar	Yildiz's mother	Main
