= Make Me Believe (film) =

2023 Turkish romantic comedy film

- Turkish: Sen Inandir
- Directed by: Evren Karabiyik Günaydin; Murat Saraçoglu
- Written by: Selen Bagci
- Produced by: Cemal Okan; Timur Savci
- Starring: Ayça Ayşin Turan; Ekin Koç
- Cinematography: Sedat Yücel
- Music by: Doga Ebrisim
- Production company: Birtaff Productions
- Distributed by: Netflix
- Release date: 23 June 2023
- Country: Turkey
- Language: Turkish

Make Me Believe (Turkish: Sen Inandir) is a 2023 Turkish romantic comedy film directed by Evren Karabiyik Günaydin and Murat Saraçoglu and starring Ayça Ayşin Turan and Ekin Koç.

Sahra and Deniz, former high school sweethearts, have meddling grandmothers who trick them into a meet-cute, reigniting a childhood crush and old grudges.

== Plot ==
Neighboring grandmothers call their respective grandkids Sahra and Deniz with fake heart problems. While they are at the beach, the two youth show up to take care of them. Sahra and Deniz used to know each other, but each has gone on their own path. Fearing her grandmother is ill, she throws his motorcycle helmet through a window to enter quickly, which he later insists is damaged irrepairably. Both elderly women claim to feel forgotten.

Magazine editor Sahra's sister Ahu calls. Her rival Kerem is sneakily trying to land the next cover, while she is away. Her grandma coerces her into returning a plate to the other, who in turn insists Deniz open the door. The two openly clash, frustrating the older women.

In the evening, Sahra gleefully tells her grandmother Kerem's lead is less promising than hers. She mentions a Deniz, whose contact info she has gotten. Although this photographer has always refused, Sahra believes she will get the needed interview.

Next, Deniz's grandmother asks Sahra to get her cat from a tree, gives her a ladder to climb, then 'accidentally' removes it. The other grandmother gets Deniz under the tree, then Sahra clumsily cuts his head with the ladder. Later on, her grandmother sends her to treat his wound.

Deniz refuses to see her, so Sahra leaves the first aid materials. As she is leaving, she recognizes a photograph on the wall, which his grandmother confirms he is the elusive photographer Deniz Tunali. Sahra contacts Ahu to come help, due to their clashes.

Early the next morning, Sahra wakes the recently arrived Ahu, suggesting they do a big breakfast together with both houses. However, Deniz and his friend Ulas show up long after breakfast is finished. His friend joins them first, Deniz initially refuses but eventually goes over. Ahu has brought a helmet to replace the 'cracked' one, but ironically it is a girl's helmet. The sisters go to Ulas' bar, hoping to trick Deniz into doing their magazine's photo shoot. Sitting at a table, soon Ulas joins them. The women tell him their need for a photographer, so when Deniz comes, he waves him over.

Deniz takes Sahra to a few possible shooting locations. Later, after having drinks, a tourist hits on her. Deniz intervenes, and all get arrested.

After spending the night together in a cell, in the morning Deniz gives Sahra a ride on his motorbike. She asks him to slow, but he instead speeds up. Eventually, Sahra forces him to stop, explaining she is petrified, as both of her parents died on a motorcycle. She asks they go back to being just friends and Deniz says they never were, kissing her.

Upon their return, everyone notes that Sahra and Deniz seem different, but neither divulges anything. Ahu asks if she secured an interview, but she admits not yet. Deniz takes Sahra to a place where they had been together at 15. There he reveals he has been so cold because he had a crush on her, but Sahra acted indifferent. She seemingly flaunted others in his face, so he felt rejected.

Sahra apologizes for being oblivious. Later she explains, as her parents died shortly after that, she stayed away to recover. Deniz's parents divorced, then moved to different parts of Europe. Deniz says his photos speak for themselves, so explaining would spoil their impact.

Sahra and Deniz spend the weekend together, falling in love. Late on Sunday, the magazine shoot photographer backs out on short notice, so Deniz offers to take the photos. While Sahra and Ahu are watching the shoot, the interview is brought up. She insists it will not happen, due to Deniz's principals, although she will lose her job at the magazine.

Gerem shows up, divulging Sahra is meant to conduct an interview with Deniz. Upset, he storms off, refusing to talk to her. Sahra returns home, where she puts together an article about Deniz. When the article comes out, it is about his beliefs and him, without disclosing a photo or other personal information.

At Sahra's promotion celebration dinner, Deniz appears. Having read the article, he realizes she sees him. They kiss, showing everyone they are together at last.

== Cast ==
- Ayça Ayşin Turan as Sahra
- Ekin Koç as Deniz
- Çağlae Irmak as Ahu
- Cagri Citanak as Ulas
- Kemal Okan Özkan as Kerem
- Bülent Gültekin as Mert
- Yildiz Kültür as Aysel
- Zerrin Sümer as Semiha

== Reception ==
A critic from Collider wrote that "Make Me Believe has created a world that the viewer can get lost in. The dreamily-paced romantic developments which build between the beautiful actors are supported by stunning visual backdrops of sparkling seas, sun-dappled quaint towns, and ancient rocky coastlines". A critic from Common Sense Media rated the film two out of five stars and wrote that "Make Me Believe is a fumbling, formulaic romcom in which two self-absorbed singles are pushed together by their meddling grandmothers". A critic from LeisureByte wrote that "It is like every average rom-com, so if someone wanted to see this film, they could do for the brilliant location and stunning actors who all looked blessed by the sun throughout the course of the movie". A critic from OTTplay rated the film 2 1/2 out of 5 stars and wrote that "Make Me Believe makes for a good one-time watch, and that’s it. It’s a feel-good film, lifted by postcard-esque vistas of a scenic seaside Turkish town".
