= Turks in Space =

Dünyayı Kurtaran Adam'ın Oğlu
- Original theatrical release poster
- Directed by: Kartal Tibet
- Written by: Murat Boyacioglu
- Produced by: Cengiz Cagatay; Kemal Kaplanoglu; Senol Zencir
- Starring: Cüneyt Arkın
- Cinematography: Tolga Kutlar
- Edited by: Bora Göksingöl; Kartal Tibet
- Music by: Garo Mafyan
- Distributed by: Tiglon; Zero Film
- Release date: 15 December 2006
- Running time: 103 minutes
- Country: Turkey
- Language: Turkish
- Budget: USD$5 million

Dünyayı Kurtaran Adam'ın Oğlu (literally The Son of the Man who Saved the World and regularly titled Turks in Space in English) is a 2006 Turkish science fiction action comedy film directed by Kartal Tibet and the sequel to Dünyayı Kurtaran Adam (The Man Who Saved the World). Actor/martial artist Cüneyt Arkın reprises his role.

== Plot ==
Set in the future of 2055, the world is in chaos and in need of a governmental system to form peace. A still-standing “Orion union” between all the states is all they have.

The son of Murat from the first film works with his twin brother (who he does not know is his twin brother) in order to save the world.

== Cast ==
- Cüneyt Arkın as Murat
- Haldun Boysan as Kazu
- Berda Ceyhan as BC13
- Veysel Diker as Doktor
- Mehmet Ali Erbil as Captain Kartal / Zaldabar, Murat's son
- Ali Erkazan as Kazanci cemal
- Didem Erol as Caroline
- Ayşen Gruda as Safiye Ana
- Egemen Gunes as Ozi
- Bayazit Gülercan as President Orion
- Burak Hakkı as Gökmen
- Ismail Incekara as Dogibus
- Burcu Kara as Princess Maya
- Günay Karacaoğlu as Teorik Tugce
- Alp Kırşan as Spoth

== Production ==
There had long been the idea of a sequel after the predecessor was released. Following several failed attempts to get the cast back together, the project began production. In an interview they stated the sequel would not have much similarity to the original other than “animation similarities”

== Reception ==
As of 2022, the film had a 1.5 rating on IMDb, which put it among the lowest-rated movies ever.
