= Özge Yağız =

Turkish actress (born 1997)

- Born: 26 September 1997 (age 28); Istanbul, Turkey
- Occupation: Actress
- Years active: 2018–present

Özge Yağız (born 26 September 1997) is a Turkish actress who gained widespread recognition for her breakout role as Reyhan in the popular drama series Yemin. She has starring in notable Turkish television dramas such as Sol Yanım, Baba, Safir, and Nature Of Love

== Early life ==
Özge Yağız was born on 26 September 1997 in Istanbul. She is the youngest member of a family of four. She studied at Başkent University's Communication Sciences Academy. She graduated with a specialty in dietetics and took acting classes while at Başkent University. Upon graduating from Başkent University she worked as a dietician before starting her acting career at the age of 21 with a small role on the program Adını Sen Koy.

== Career ==
She started her acting career in 2018, with a small role in season 3 of the series Adını Sen Koy and portrayed Zeliha, which was broadcast on Star TV.

In February 2019, she appeared in the daytime series Yemin on Kanal 7, as Reyhan. It was her first leading role, which opened prime time doors for her. Later in 2020, she starred in Sol Yanım as Serra.

In 2021, she began working on İçimizden Biri, in which she portrayed Havva, daughter of a Turkish Muslim family. In 2022, she appeared in the TV series Baba over two seasons of 30 episodes. She appeared as Büşra Saruhanli, Emin's only daughter.

In 2023 she starred in two yet to be released films. In Başka Türlü Aşk she played the lead role. She also starred in Beyaz Eşya. In 2023, she starred in Safir, where she played the lead character Feraye. In 2025, she starred in Gözleri Karadeniz where she played the character Güneş Aydinay. Her co-star in this series was Halit Özgür Sarı, playing the role of Azil Yılmaz.

In 2026 she began appearing in a new summer TV show Doğanın Kanunu, also known as Nature of Love, on Star and Amazon Prime.

== Personal life ==
Özge has an elder sister, Ezgi Yagiz.

The actress was in a relationship with Gökberk Demirci, whom she met on the television series Yemin in 2019. The couple became engaged but ended their relationship in 2022. In late 2023, Özge began dating her Safir co-star, Burak Berkay Akgül, with whom she appeared on the leading role, the relationship ended in November 2025. Özge is currently single.

== Filmography ==
Television
Year	Title	Role	Notes	Channel
2018	Adını Sen Koy	Zeliha Yılmaz	Supporting role	TV8
2019–2020	Yemin	Reyhan Tarhun	Leading role	Kanal 7
2020–2021	Sol Yanım	Serra Yıldırım	Leading role	Star TV
2021	İçimizden Biri	Havva Aladağ	Leading role	Show TV
2022	Baba	Büşra Saruhanlı	Supporting role	Show TV
2023–2024	Safir	Feraye Yılmaz	Leading role	ATV
2025	Gözleri Karadeniz	Günes Aydinay	Leading role	ATV
2026	Nature Of Love	Doğa Arcalı	Leading role	Star Tv
Internet
Year	Title	Role	Note	Channel
2022–2023	Çekiç ve Gül: Bir Behzat Ç. Hikayesi	Seher	Guest	BluTV
Movies
Year	Title	Role	Notes	Cinema
2024	Beyaz Eşya	Zeynep	Leading role	Cinema
N/A	Başka Türlü Aşk	Dilek	Leading Role	Cinema

== Voice acting ==
Year	Title	Role	Ref.	Notes
2022	Dolphin Boy / Yunus Çocuk	Mia		Animated film, voice role

== Awards and nominations ==
Year	Award ceremony	Category	Project	Ref.	Result
2023	Harper's Bazaar Women of the Year	Rising Star			Won
2023	49th Golden Butterfly Awards	Shining Stars			Won
2023	Festiculture Event	Popular TV Actress of the Year	Safir		Won
