= Hazal Filiz Küçükköse =

Turkish actress (born 1988)

- Born: 9 February 1988 (age 37); Mersin, Turkey
- Education: Kırıkkale University (left); Ankara University
- Occupation: Actress
- Spouse: Tuan Tunalı (m. 2014; div. 2018)

Hazal Filiz Küçükköse (born 9 February 1988) is a Turkish actress. She is best known for her role as Zeynep Soydere in the TV series Kara Sevda, which has been broadcast to 110 countries worldwide.

== Life and career ==
Küçükköse completed high school in Ankara. She studied at the Department of Biology at Kırıkkale University's Science and Literature Faculty until the third semester, and continued her undergraduate studies at the Department of Chemistry at Ankara University's Science Faculty. Küçükköse stated that she was discovered by a casting director who saw her photos by chance at a social networking site and that her acting career began with her participation in actor selections. Küçükköse said, "I found myself in front of the camera while preparing for the general biology visa."

Her first antagonist role was in Günahkar against Seçkin Özdemir, which was the start of her leading roles from then on. However, the series ended due to low ratings with its 7th episode. The next year, she gained fame for playing in Kara Sevda and continued acting in more TV series with starring roles, including as the fictional daughter of Çandarlı Halil Pasha, Melike Hatun, in Mehmed: Bir Cihan Fatihi.

== Filmography ==
Year	TV series	Role	Notes
2009–2010	Deniz Yıldızı	Gözde	Guest Appearance
2011–2012	Kalbim Seni Seçti	Ada	Supporting role
2012	Ustura Kemal	Kalisto	Supporting role
2012	Uçurum	-	Guest Appearance
2014	Beni Affet	Leyla	Supporting role
2014	Günahkar	Aslıhan Karasu	Leading role
2015–2017	Kara Sevda	Zeynep Soydere	Leading role
2017	Rüya	Elif Ardali	Leading role
2018	Mehmed: Bir Cihan Fatihi	Melike Hatun	Leading role
2020	Zemheri	Berrak	Leading role
2022	Bir Peri Masalı	Neslihan Köksal	Leading role
2023	Üvey Anne	Serap Kutlu	Leading role

Year	Film	Role	Notes
2023	Kötü Adamın 10 Günü	Buket Köseoğlu	

== Awards and nominations ==
Year	Occasion	Award - Category	Film	Result
2018	Turkey Youth Awards	Golden Star - Best Supporting TV Actress	Endless Love	Nominated
2017	Turkey Youth Awards	Golden Star - Best Supporting TV Actress	Endless Love	Nominated
2017	Pantene Golden Butterfly Awards	Golden Butterfly - Rising Star	N/A	Won
