= Alp Navruz =

Turkish model and actor (born 1990)

- Born: Seyit Alp Navruz; January 15, 1990 (age 36); Istanbul, Turkey
- Education: Yıldız Technical University
- Occupations: Actor, model
- Years active: 2016–present
- Partner: Ayça Ayşin Turan

Seyit Alp Navruz is a Turkish actor and model.

== Life and career ==
Alp was born in Istanbul. He graduated Yıldız Technical University with a degree in Turkish Language and Literature. Navruz's interest in acting began at a young age. After being cast in roles on stage during his primary school years, he took acting lessons from Altan Erkekli and Cihan Ünal. Meanwhile, he continued his career as a model. He made his cinematic debut in 2015 with a leading role in Ceberrut. In 2016, he was cast in the TV series Aşk Laftan Anlamaz. In which he took a part as a side character with Hande Erçel and Burak Deniz as lead roles (Hayat and Murat) He became widely known for his role as Sinan Egemen in the Turkish TV drama "Fazilet Hanim ve kizlari" (Mrs.Fazilet and her daughters) which was broadcast by Star TV (2017-8). His first leading role on a TV series came with his role in TRT 1 series Elimi Bırakma as Cenk (Jenk) Çelen further contributed to his career.

In 2020 he began new series Zümrüduanka starring as Serhat Demirkan. On 15 June 2021, he starred as Poyraz Ali Özgür opposite Ayça Ayşin Turan in Star TV series Ada Masalı

In 2022 and 2023 he starred in TV series Yürek Çıkmazı with role of Halil Tekin opposite İrem Helvacıoğlu.

== Filmography ==
=== Television ===
Year	Title	Role	Notes
2016	Aşk Laftan Anlamaz	Cenk	Supporting role
2016	Arkadaşlar İyidir	Berke	Supporting role
2016	Kertenkele: Yeniden Doğuş	Tankut	Guest appearance
2017–2018	Mrs. Fazilet and Her Daughters	Sinan Egemen	Main role
2018–2019	Elimi Bırakma	Cenk Çelen	Main role
2020–2021	Zümrüdüanka	Serhat Demirkan	Main role
2021	Menajerimi Ara	Himself	Guest appearance
2021	Ada Masalı	Poyraz Ali Özgür	Main role
2022–2023	Yürek Çıkmazı	Halil Tekin	Main role
2024	Senden Önce	Hakan Dağıstan	Main role
2025	Piyasa	Kenan Akın	Main role
2026	Şule: Senin Hikâyen	Kerem Akay	Main role

=== Film ===
Year	Title	Role	Notes
2016	Ceberrut	Mert	Leading role
2024	Her Şeyin Başı Merkür	Fırat	Leading role
