= Gonca Vuslateri =

Turkish actress

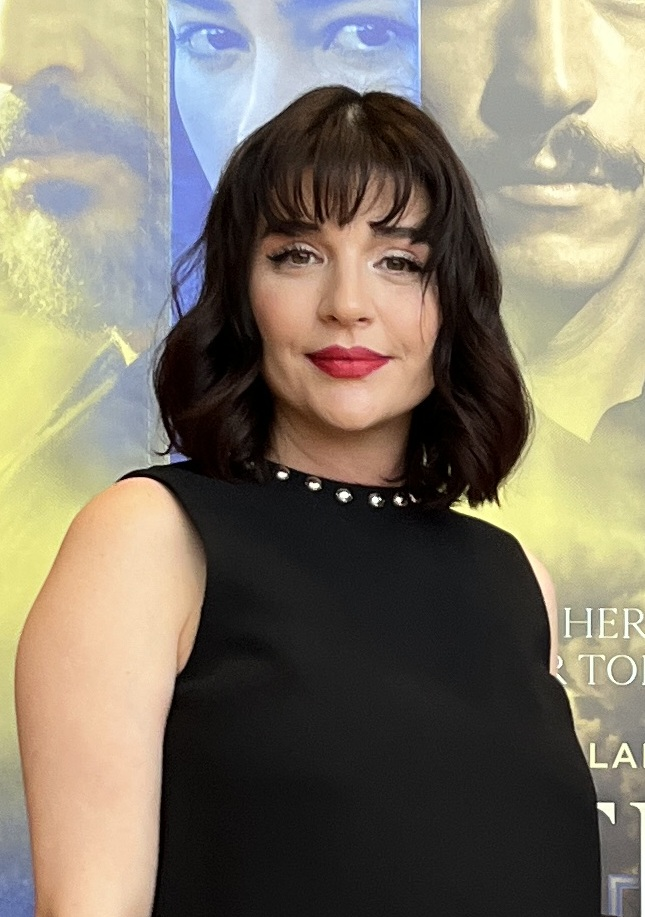
- Vuslateri in 2024
- Born: Nazlı Gonca Vuslateri; 2 September 1986 (age 40); Bursa, Turkey
- Occupation: Actress
- Years active: 1997–present
- Spouses: Edip Burak Ertoğan (m. 2015; div. 2018) Levent Yaşar (m. 2024)
- Children: 1

Nazlı Gonca Vuslateri (born 2 September 1986) is a Turkish actress, columnist, screenwriter, poet, radio host and acting trainer.

== Biography ==
Vuslateri was born in Bursa on 2 September 1986. She has an older sister, musician Aslı Vuslateri and a stepbrother, Cem Vuslateri. She is of Turkish, Circassian, Abkhazian, Georgian, and Arab descent. Her father was an officer and many of her family work in the army. Gaffar Okkan, chief constable of Diyarbakır who was assassinated in an ambush is a cousin of her grandfather.

Since the age of nine, Vuslateri has studied acting (including kids theatre, Eric Morris, Susana Morris, Enis Fosforoğlu). She graduated from Theater Department of Müjdat Gezen Art Center. Vuslateri, who also worked at the "Dot" theatre, performed a wide range of characters in various genres, including comedy, drama. She played two different characters in comedy series Yalan Dünya simultaneously and won the Golden Butterfly Award for Best Comedy Actress. After portraying the 75 year-old Vasfiye in Yalan Dünya, Vuslateri damaged her vocal chords and was required to visit a sound therapist.

For her role as "Şule" in the series Anne, she was chosen as the best actress of the year by Hürriyet. She later played in Küçük Sırlar, the Turkish remake of Gossip Girl. She played in the Netflix sci-fi series Sıcak Kafa. She portrayed "Masha" by Anton Chekhov in an adaptation of the play The Seagull. During her theatre career, she won two Afife Jale Play Awards and a Sadri Alışık Award. She has published her own poetry book, Manik Serçe. She also the script for the movie Cenazemize Hoşgeldiniz and the children's play Kırmızı Başlıklı Kız Uzayda. She occasionally gives acting lessons.

Vuslateri continues to write in the "Giriş Katın Bir Altı" column of Hürriyet newspaper and presents the "Giriş Katın Bir Altı" radio programme on NTV radio.

== Filmography ==
=== As screenwriter ===
==== Film ====
- Cenazemize Hoşgeldiniz (2023)

==== Theatre ====
- Kırmızı Başlıklı Kız Uzayda

==== As Actress ====
Web series
Title	Year	Role
Sıcak Kafa	2022	Yasemin
Ru	2024	Seda
TV series
Title	Year	Role
Süper Baba	1997	
Eyvah Kızım Büyüdü	2000	
Aliye	2004	
Büyük Buluşma	2004	Filiz
Kız Babası	2006	
Canım Ailem	2009	Nurcan
Küçük Sırlar	2010–2011	Ceyla
Yerden Yüksek	2011	Kumru
İbreti Ailem	2012	Yıldız
Yalan Dünya	2012–2014	Eylem and Vasfiye
Gönül İşleri	2014	Kader
Anne	2016–2017	Şule
Tehlikeli Karım	2018	Derin Boztepe
Bambaşka Biri	2023	Sedef Atılbay
Leyla: Hayat... Aşk... Adalet...	2024	Nur Yıldız
Film
Title	Year	Role
Bornova Bornova	2009	Hande
Kaybedenler Kulübü	2011	
Bizans Oyunları	2016	5. Klitorya IV
Düğüm Salonu	2018	
Hedefim Sensin	2018	
Horoz Dövüşü	2022	Jeyan
Kuzenler Firarda	2022	
Allah Yazdıysa Bozsun	2022	
Her Şey Dahil	2022	
Alya	2023	Defne
Cenazemize Hoşgeldiniz	2023	Misliye
Zaferin Rengi	2024	Vera
Dilemma	2024	
Short film
Title	Year	Role
Kadife Çoraplar	2012	
Ve Sonsuza Kadar Mutlu Yaşadılar	2012	

=== Music videos (as actress) ===
- Pentagram - Gündüz Gece
- Nazan Öncel - Aşkitom
- Can Bonomo - Kara
- Hayko Cepkin - Nikah Masası

=== Commercial ===
- Media Markt (Vasfiye)
- Axa Sigorta

== Theatre ==
- Artiz Mektebi
- Bana Mastikayı Çalsana
- Vur Yağmala Yeniden
- Punk Rock – Simon Stephens – Tiyatro Dot – 2010
- Kabin – Kemal Hamamcıoğlu – Craft Tiyatro – 2013
- The Seagull – Anton Chekhov – Pürtelaş Tiyatro – 2017
- Erkek Arkadaşım Bir Feminist

== Discography ==
- "Sana Dair" (2016) with Tuna Kiremitçi
- "Hep Bi' Şey Eksik" (2020)

== Books ==
- Manik Serçe (2016)

== Columnist ==
- Giriş Katın Bir Altı

== Radio ==
- Giriş Katın Bir Altı
