= Yiğit Kirazcı =

Turkish actor

- Born: Mustafa Yiğit Kirazcı; 17 August 1983 (age 43); Istanbul, Turkey
- Education: Istanbul Bilgi University
- Occupation: Actor
- Years active: 2007–present

Yiğit Kirazcı (born 17 August 1983) is a Turkish actor.

== Filmography ==
Television
Year	Title	Role	Notes	Network
2007	Son Tercih	Teoman	Guest appearance	Show TV
2011	Mavi Kelebekler	Kosta Nikoliç	Guest appearance	TRT 1
2012	Sudan Bıkmış Balıklar	Erkan	Guest appearance	Star TV
2013–2014	Vicdan		Supporting role	Kanal D
2014–2016	Güllerin Savaşı	Mert Gencer	Supporting role	Kanal D
2016–2017	Seviyor Sevmiyor	Tuna Ertürk	Leading role	ATV
2017	Seni Kimler Aldı	Barış Çamay	Leading role	ATV
2018	8. Gün	Ahmet Ekşi	Supporting role	ATV
2019	Yüzleşme	Levent Elibeyaz	Leading role	Kanal D
2020	Hizmetçiler	Aras Atahanlı	Leading role	Kanal D
2020	Çatı Katı Aşk	Demir Yılmaz	Leading role	Kanal D
2021–2022	Evlilik Hakkında Her Şey	Yıldırım Şahin	Leading role	FOX
2023–	Kızılcık Şerbeti	Rüzgâr	Supporting role	Show TV
2024	Leyla: Hayat... Aşk... Adalet...	Mehmet Ali "Mali" Ertaş	Leading role	Now
Streaming series and films
Year	Title	Role	Notes	Platform
2019	Hakan: Muhafız	Fırat	Supporting role	Netflix
2020	Galiçya İşgal Altında	Oytun	Leading role	YouTube
2021	50M2	Yakup	Supporting role	Netflix
2021	Ex Aşkım	Can	Leading role	GAİN
2022	Aşkın Kıyameti	Yusuf	Leading role	Netflix
Yakında	Sarmaşık Zamanı	Özgür	Leading role	beIN CONNECT
Cinema
Year	Title	Role	Notes	
2008	Cin Geçidi	First young guy	Supporting role	
2015	Tabula Rosa	Sinan	Leading role	
2018	Baba Nerdesin Kayboldum	Ali	Leading role	
2018	İyi Oyun	Özer	Leading role	
2020	Aşk Tesadüfleri Sever 2	Kerem	Leading role	
2023	Mucize Aynalar	Kerim	Leading role	
