= Gökberk Demirci =

Turkish actor (born 1989)

- Born: İzmit, Turkey
- Occupation: Actor
- Years active: 2012–present

Gökberk Demirci is a Turkish actor known for Yemin (2019), Hayatımın Aşkı (2016), and Arka Sokaklar (2012).

== Education ==
He took acting lessons in Cengiz Küçükayvaz theater.

== Career ==
Gökberk Demirci, who started his acting career with a minor role in the TV series, Bir Zamanlar Osmanlı: Kıyam (2012), he was acting lead role in the TV series Yemin as Emir Tarhun, produced by Kanal 7. after that role in the series, many doors opened in his career.

He is currently starring in the series Üç Kız Kardeş as the character Kartal Köksal. The series is based on the novel İclal Aydın. The series was produced by Kanal D.

== Personal life ==
In 2019, Gokberk was in a relationship with his Yemin co star, Özge Yağız where they met. After a few years, the pair were engaged but eventually broke off the engagement and split in 2022.

== Filmography ==
=== Television ===
Year	Work	Role
2012	Bir Zamanlar Osmanlı: Kıyam	
2013	Osmanlı’da Derin Devle	
2017	Hayatımın Aşkı	Adil
2018	Adını Sen Koy	Kılıç
2018	Arka Sokaklar	Cüneyt
2019–2022	Yemin	Emir Tarhun
2023–2024	Üç Kız Kardeş	Kartal Köksal
2024	Yalan	Yaman
2025	Rüya Gibi	Bora
2026	Vefa Sultan	Zülfikar Ağa

=== Film ===
Year	Work	Role
2015	Demir Atlı Gringo	
2016	Yıldızlar da Kayar: Das Borak	chauffeur
2023	Köy Düğünü	Emre
2024	Gidersen Gitme	Mehmet
