= Yemin =

Turkish TV series

- Written by: Nazmiye Yılmaz
- Directed by: Hakan Arslan; Reyhan Pekar
- Starring: Özge Yağız; Gökberk Demirci; Cansu Tuman; Setenay Süer; Can Verel; Yağmur Şahbazova
- No. of seasons: 4
- No. of episodes: 503

Production
- Running time: 60-70 minutes

Original release
- Network: Kanal 7
- Release: 18 February 2019 – 9 October 2022

Yemin (often marketed as The Promise) is a Turkish drama series produced by Kanal 7. The leading roles are played by Özge Yağız and Gökberk Demirci. Ayhan Özen was the director of the Yemin series from season 1-2. From season 3 the serial is directed by Hakan Arslan and Reyhan Pekar. This serial was shot in Istanbul, Turkey.

== Plot ==
Hikmet brought Reyhan, his niece to Istanbul to marry his spoiled son, Emir. Reyhan did not want to marry a stranger but her Uncle requests her by telling her about his disease. She reluctantly agrees for her uncle's sake. Emir did not want to marry too because he loves his freedom too much. But after being forced by his father he agreed. But he swore to treat Reyhan badly so that she herself will divorce him. Reyhan was treated badly by Emir and his mother, Cavidan but found comfort in her uncle and her sister-in-law, Suna. Things change. Reyhan and Emir fell in love with each other. But at the end of the first season, Reyhan is deciding whether or not to leave Emir.

At the beginning of the next season (season 2), Reyhan decided not to leave Emir and both are upset with each other. Cemre sets the house where Emir and Reyhan are staying on fire. The next morning Reyhan confess her love to Emir. As days were passing Cemre created a fake video against Emir and threatened Reyhan to divorce Emir for his well. Reyhan considered Emir's well she decided to give divorce, but Emir is still fighting for his love. Emir's mother said to Reyhan that she needs to pay for whatever Reyhan and other members eat or use so Reyhan starts a job as a cleaner because she is a proud girl and doesn't want to be a burden on anyone, Cemre's mother, Suheyla learns Cemre and Cavidan's evil plans against Emir and Reyhan and decides to tell Emir everything, but she is hit and killed by a car. Days later, Emir finally watches the fake video and Cemre is arrested. Thinking that she has lost everything, Cemre tries to commit suicide by throwing herself in front of a car, but she survives, escapes from the hospital and tries to burn to death Emir and Reyhan once again by kidnapping Suna. This time Suna manages to walk and saves them from leading their life to death. Cemre ends up in the mental hospital and exposes Cavidan to the police.

However, nobody believes in Cemre because she has gone crazy and in order to save herself, Cavidan hires a man to give an electric shock to Cemre so that everything is erased from her memory. Cavidan plays a new game against Reyhan: she hires a girl who pretends to be her lost sister Gulsum and together they make plans against her. However, once Reyhan sacrifices herself and goes to jail in the place of her fake sister, Gulsum starts helping her. She gets her out of prison and later when Reyhan gets pregnant, Cavidan tries to kill her baby with poison, but Gulsum prevents this by making Cavidan eat these pills and making her sick. When Cavidan learns this she asks Talaz to help her get rid of her and one of his guys tries to kill both Gulsum and Reyhan. Gulsum dies to save Reyhan and before closing her eyes she tells her that she is not her real sister. Meanwhile, Cemre escapes once again from the mental hospital and returns with regained memory determined to kill Cavidan. While Cavidan is planning to close Reyhan in a poisonous warehouse, but she falls into her own trap because of Cemre who has heard her plan. Talaz saves her. Meanwhile, Reyhan is in danger because of her pregnancy: the doctors tell her that either she or her baby will die and that she won't be able to become pregnant again. Emir agrees to childbirth for Reyhan.

Narin hears about the complications of Reyhan's pregnancy and takes her to another patient, who had the same complications as Reyhan but she has given birth safely. The patient asks Emir and Reyhan to bring back her husband who has left her due to complications. Emir and Reyhan inform Ahmet(the patient's husband) about his child and wife. But he doesn't agree to come. Cemre visits Cavidan and poisons her drink. Talaz is worried about her safety. In the season finale episode Some ruffians come and attack Ahamet. While Emir fights them, one of them shoots the pistol. They didn't show who was hurt by the bullet. The series of events from season 1 and 2 are shown in the end.

Reyhan is dead in season 3. Her baby is born but emir does not want him, he abandons both him and buries all the memories of Reyhan. Hikmet is fine now, he is doing all he could so that Emir loves his son. Cavidan is in prison and she has regretted very much for all her evil actions. Here she meets Feride to whom he asks to look after her grandson. When Cavidan tells her about Reyhan's death and that there is no mother for his grandson she asks Feride to take be a mother for him but she denies saying she can't. Feride needs money for her brother's treatment, so Cavidan gives her money to which Feride swears to her that she will be a mother to her grandson, but when she arrives in the mansion she is treated bad by Emir. Soon both start to fall in love with each other. Feride's sister-in-law Songul keeps Cavidan's money for herself and lets her husband die. Later, she goes to the mansion with the intention of staying here forever. A guy obsessed in love with Feride, Resit kidnaps Emir's son and after his rescue he starts to love him. Songul marries Hikmet. Resit tells Emir about Feride's connection with Cavidan, but he lies that Feride is a money hunter. So, Emir plans to revenge her. Songul brings Feride's father to the mansion in order to spoil Feride's good image and she makes her a thief in Emir's eyes with a plan. The wedding day of Emir and Feride arrives and Feride writes a letter to Emir where she confesses everything about her connection with Cavidan, but Songul changes this letter. Emir betrays Feride instead of carrying our their wedding by exposing the facts about her together with some lies he misunderstood in front of everyone. After this, Feride leaves the mansion and Cemre, who has changed too, takes her to stay at her house. Emir finally finds Feride's real letter, but Songul's real face is still not revealed since she points Oya as the person who changed the letter. Emir tries so hard to make Feride forgive him, but without result. Meanwhile, Songul starts collaborating with Talaz. Cavidan learns this thanks to Cemre and threatens her that she will be the old Cavidan if she hurts the family. Songul asks Talaz to frighten Cavidan, but things don't turn out as planned since she is hit by an unknown car while Talaz drives against her. After the accident, she loses her memory and she remembers only Emir as a kid so they take her back to the mansion. Cemre learns about Talaz's involvement in Cavidan's accident, reports him to the police and goes far away to start over. Feride understands that Emir is regretful and that he fights to show that so she finally forgives him. Feride's aunt, Emine comes from Germany and she wants Feride to get married and be happy after all these. She introduces her to a guy, Umit and they get married. At the beginning he seems to be a very nice man, but turns out to be very dangerous and ruthless. Feride has to tolerate his violent behaviour in order to protect her love ones. Hikmet finally sees Songul's real face and decides to divorce her, but he suffers a heart attack after a quarrel and is taken to hospital. Here, Songul is going to kill him by pulling his oxygen plug, but she doesn't have the courage to do it. Hikmet gets killed by Umit because he understood that Feride is unhappy with this marriage and told Emir. The whole Tarhun family is destroyed with his death. Songul takes over the company. Feride finally manages to defeat Umit with the help of his sister Ozlem, Emir and his old wives who were also tortured by him. He is sentenced to life imprisonment, but he fakes his suicide, manages to escape and shoots Emir who has visited Reyhan's grave for the first time. Feride says goodbye to the Tarhun family and goes away.

It's four years later in season 4. Emir was saved by an old man, Hasan. The Tarhun family has moved to a new mansion to start a new life. Yigit is a kid now. Melike's evil niece, Tulay comes with the intention of being with Emir. Yigit sees a girl named Gulperi running in the forest, finds her beautiful and tells Emir about her. Meanwhile, Gulperi is Hasan's neighbour and he tells Emir that she has been tortured by her uncle, Kasim since childhood. Emir is determined to protect her and takes her to the mansion. While the engagement between him and Tulay is being carried out, Kasim's men invade the mansion and start shooting. The engagement is postponed. Emir marries Gulperi in order to save her from this men. Tulay makes plan to separate them and even collaborates with Kasim. Cavidan has her doubts about this marriage since it was carried out because of need and not real love. She supports Tulay, whose real face is unknown to everyone. Tulay, being unable to send Gulperi away with her plans, thinks that the only possible way is to kill her. So, she buys a gun, points her and while Gulperi tries to take the gun from her, is being shot. Tulay's fingertips are found on the gun and is sent to jail until Gulperi lies to the police about the incident in order to save her. Emir also finds out that it was Tulay who was collaborating with Kasim and dismisses her from the mansion, but Gulperi saves her once again by telling Emir that she will leave too. After all these, Tulay plays a new game against Gulperi. She hires a man, Ahmet who pretends to be her ex-boyfriend, takes photos of them and sends these photos to Emir. As a result, he loses his trust on Gulperi and starts to ignore her. Tulay also makes Cavidan see these photos, knowing that Cavidan is more than anyone on her side. Tulay orders Ahmet to kidnap Gulperi, but Emir saves her and understands that she is innocent. Both Emir and Cavidan apologise to Gulperi for misjudging her. However, the fact that Tulay was the one who brought Ahmet doesn't come out since her brother, Ercan is pointed as guilty of Gulperi's kidnapping because of a fake farewell letter he wrote under Tulay's orders. Ahmet falls for Gulperi for real and attacks her and Emir. Emir injures him while trying to protect her and is sent to jail for a while. Ahmet is arrested. Kasim comes to the mansion to take Gulperi with him, but she is shot once again while trying to protect Emir. Kasim is arrested and is killed by Ahmet in prison, who threatens Gulperi that he will say that Emir killed him and she should divorce him, until it's revealed that it was Ahmet's work. Emir's aunt, Kadriye comes to the mansion in order to see them because she knows that she will die soon because of heart issues. She misunderstands Gulperi because of the fake marriage and Tulay's lies and she asks Emir to divorce her and marry Tulay. She doesn't want to die without seeing Emir doing the right thing for his life. After a few days, she faints and is transferred to hospital where she asks her maid Fidan to set a recording where she will tell her tastement. Tulay enters the room and tells her brother Ercan in phone that she is happy because Kadriye will help her marry Emir before she dies and says bad things about Gulperi, not knowing about the recording and that Kadriye heard everything. Kadriye changes her mind in the last moment, asks Gulperi to swear that she won't divorce Emir and dies. Meanwhile, Kasim's son also dies in prison committing suicide. His wife and her son, Beyhan and Savas come to the mansion to take revenge on Gulperi for their deaths. However, Savas turns out to be manipulated by Beyhan and has deep feelings for Gulperi. Tulay tries to kill Gulperi once again, but he saves her. When Emir is kidnapped, he helps Gulperi to save him too and gets shot and injured. Days later, he reveals Tulay's real face to the family with the help of his guy Baran and Kadriye's maid Fidan by showing the video days later. Tulay gets dismissed from the mansion. She plans a car accident in order to be accepted back, but they don't change their minds. Being unable to accept defeat, she decides to poison the whole family in the engagement of Baran and Fidan, but in the end Yigit drops the poisoned drink by mistake and Tulay is the only one poisoned and killed. Beyhan loses her other son in jail too and she becomes even worse after this. She orders Gulperi and Savas to get married by threatening Gulperi with Emir's life. Emir secretly gives the ownership of the mansion to Savas. While their engagement has already taken place and they are preparing to get married, Emir hears the truth. Savas doesn't want this marriage either and cuts the engagement off. After all these, Beyhan says very bad things to Gulperi that make suffer from severe mental breakdown and lose her mind. While arguing with Cavidan, Beyhan loses her balance and falls off the stairs. She sends Cavidan to jail for this, but Savas sets her out. Gulperi's father, Bekir turns out to be alive, but he is thought to have killed her mother. At the beginning, Gulperi doesn't accept him, but it turns out that Kasim was the murderer. She finally forgives Bekir and start to recover. Later, he is kidnapped and Emir with Savas collaborate to rescue him. Bekir is shot and when he recover, he asks Gulperi to go back to Mardin with him to start over. Emir is very sad deep down, but he can't prevent it. Beyhan burns the house and Bekir's plans go wrong. Beyhan also finds out that Savas is the owner of Tarhun mansion and that he let them stay despite that and goes crazy. When Savas says that he won't let her harm the Tarhun family, she points him with the gun. While she is ready to shoot him, she faints from her own hatred. Emir tells Gulperi that he wants her to stay. After eight months, Beyhan has died and Savas goes abroad and leaves everything behind. He gives his house and car to Baran and Fidan. He also gives the mansion back to Emir as a gift for their wedding. Emir and Gulperi have finally married and become a loving couple. They leave for their honeymoon along with Yigit and all the family is gathered in the mansion to celebrate these happy moments.

== Cast ==
- Özge Yağız as Reyhan Tarhun: Hikmet niece. Emir first wife. Yigit Mother. (Dead)
- Gökberk Demirci as Emir Tarhun: Hikmet & Cavidan son Suna's elder brother. Reyhan's & Gulperi's husband yigit. Father
- Cansu Tuman as Feride
- Can Verel as Kemal Tarhun
- Yağmur Şahbazova as Narin Tarhun
- Munise Özlem as Leyla (Dead)
- Berkant Müftüler as Hikmet Tarhun (Dead)
- Aysun Güven as Kadriye Tarhun (Dead)
- Gül Arcan as Cavidan Tarhun
- Cansın Mina Gür as Masal Tarhun (child)
- Ceyda Olguner as Cemre
- Sıla Türkoğlu as Suna Tarhun
- Ali Dereli as Zafer
- Derya Kurtuluş Oktar as Şehriye
- Tuğçe Ersoy as Süheyla (Dead)
- Mustafa Şimşek as Talaz
- Can Çaglar as Taci
- Barış Gürses as Sefer
- Yağmur Akdağ as Nigar
- Bengü Gürses as Pelin
- Bora Atabey as Erhan (Dead)
- Hilal Anay as Gülsüm (Dead)
- Gözde Gündüzlü as Oya
- Balım Gaye Bayrak as Zeynep
- Elif Özkul Elsayit as Kumru
- Hülya Aydın as Songül
- Melahat Abbasova as Münevver
- Miran Efe Achylov as Yiğit Tarhun (baby)
- Gürkan Tavukçuoğlu as Ümit
- Öyküm Atmaca as Özlem
- Setenay Süer as Gülperi Tarhun
- Ahmet Ömer Akıner as Yiğit Tarhun (child)
- Büşra Oğur as Tülay (Dead)
- Hatice Öztürk as Meltem (Dead)
- Yiğit Arslan as Mert
- Merve Küçükşakar as Bade
- Sude Aydın as Masal Tarhun (teenager)
- Nevzat Yılmaz as Hasan
- Ali Yağız Durmuş as Savaş
- Neslihan Öztürk as Beyhan (Dead)
- Mehmet Baştürk as Baran
- Gamze Çetinkaya as Fidan
