= Djinn Wedding =

2026 Turkish drama film

- International teaser poster
- Turkish: Cinlerin Düğünü
- Directed by: Ferit Karahan
- Screenplay by: Ferit Karahan
- Produced by: Berkin Kaya; Kanat Doğramacı; Gülistan Acet Karahan; Ferit Karahan
- Starring: Demet Özdemir; Kaan Yıldırım; İlhan Şen; Sarp Bozkurt
- Cinematography: Serdar Özdemir
- Edited by: Ferit Karahan; Marco Spoletini; Ahmet Boyacıoğlu; Yusuf Ziya Kaya; Mustafa Umut Ay
- Music by: İlke Ulaş Kuvanç
- Production company: Ferit Karahan Films
- Distributed by: Luxbox
- Release date: 16 September 2026 (TIFF)
- Running time: 132 minutes
- Country: Turkey
- Language: Turkish

Djinn Wedding (Turkish: Cinlerin Düğünü) is a 2026 Turkish drama film written and directed by Ferit Karahan. Set in a remote Anatolian village, it follows four siblings through three distinct stages: childhood, adolescence, and adulthood.

The film had its world premiere in the Platform section of the 2026 Toronto International Film Festival on 16 September, where it competed for the Platform Prize.

== Synopsis ==
Four siblings and their family live in a remote village in a house they are not legally allowed to stay in, so a sense of bad luck follows them through life. Deniz, the eldest brother, manages to leave the village and study in the city. His sister Ceren has only one escape: marriage. Their younger brother Halit must stay behind to care for their disabled brother, Yasin. Years later, the siblings meet at Ceren's wedding, old memories begin to rise again. As everyone prepares for the ceremony, hidden memories and long-kept family secrets slowly come out. Forced to face their past, they deal with guilt, pain, and the unseen ties passed down through generations.

== Cast ==
- Demet Özdemir as Ceren
- Kaan Yıldırım as Halit
- İlhan Şen as Deniz
- Sarp Bozkurt as Yasin
- Helin Kandemir
- Evliya Aykan
- Erol Babaoğlu
- Baki Davrak
- Mine Çayıroğlu
- Kubilay Çamlıdag
- Deniz Barut
- Hakan Salınmış
- Medet Altuner
- Ebrar Karakoyun
- Uğur Çoban
- Erdem Oktay

== Release ==
Djinn Wedding had its world premiere at the 2026 Toronto International Film Festival on 16 September, in the Platform section.

== Accolades ==
Award	Date of ceremony	Category	Recipient(s)	Result	Ref.
Toronto International Film Festival	20 September 2026	Platform Prize	Djinn Wedding	Nominated	
