= Ramo (TV series) =

Turkish television series

- Official Poster
- Genre: Crime; Action; Drama
- Written by: Yılmaz Şahi (1-11); Toprak Karaoğlu (12-38); Seda Karaoğlu (12-38); Deniz Karaoğlu (14-38); Birol Tezcan (1-11/12-38); Esen Ali Bilen (36-40)
- Directed by: Yağız Alp Akaydın (1-11); M. Cagatay Tosun (12-40)
- Starring: Murat Yıldırım; Esra Bilgiç; İlker Aksum; Yiğit Özşener; Görkem Sevindik; İdil Fırat; Cemre Baysel; İlhan Şen; Sacide Taşaner; Macit Koper
- Composer: Aytekin Ataş
- Country of origin: Turkey
- Original language: Turkish
- No. of seasons: 2
- No. of episodes: 40

Production
- Producer: Necati Akpınar
- Production location: Adana, Turkey
- Cinematography: Özkan Bal; Cihan Yesiltarla
- Running time: 130-160 minutes

Original release
- Network: Show TV
- Release: 14 January 2020 – 16 April 2021

Ramo is a Turkish crime drama and action television series written by Yılmaz Şahin and directed by Yağız Alp Akaydın, starring Murat Yıldırım in the title role. This show is about a feud between two families and a love story between Ramo (Yıldırım) and Si̇bel (Esra Bilgiç). It was filmed in Adana, Turkey and premiered on 14 January 2020.

It airs on Show TV. The show has been well received in Turkey as well as in Pakistan.

== Plot ==
=== Season 1 ===
The first season premiered on 14 January 2020 and ended on 24 March 2020 with 11 episodes.

Ramo is a young man who works in Adana, he is the leader of his neighbourhood Taskapi and its local gang known as the Pumpers. His family smuggles gasoline and oil, work under Cengiz (played by Kerem Atabeyoglu) who is the underground leader of Adana.

After seeing the mistreatment his family gets from Cengiz, Ramo decides to become the leader of Adana by killing Cengiz, for this, he executes a plan. As the first step, Ramo retains the drugs which are supposed to be delivered to the mafia leader in Istanbul. In this way, he aims to square Cengiz. However, before he does this his childhood friend Boz (played by Gorkem Sevindik) beats Nico (played by İlhan Şen) who is the son of Cengiz. As a test of loyalty; Cengiz asks Ramo to kill Boz.

Meanwhile, Ramo comes across his first love Sibel (Esra Bilgic) (who is the daughter of Cengiz) throughout this process. She finds herself in the middle of the war between her father and her lover.

=== Season 2 ===
Title Card

== Cast and characters ==
=== Main characters ===
- Ramo Kaya (Murat Yıldırım) The main character of the series. He is the leader of his neighbourhood Taskapi and its local gang known as the Pumpers who works for Cengiz by smuggling gasoline and oil, After mistreatment given to his family, he seeks to topple Cengiz. Sibel’s husband
- Si̇bel Kaya (Esra Bilgiç) The female lead character, she is a well-educated woman who is the daughter of Cengiz and the love interest and later wife of Ramo. Her complicated relationship with Ramo when he and her father fight plays out as a main plot of the story.
- Cengiz (Kerem Atabeyoğlu)he is the underground boss of Adana and the father of Sibel and Neco.
- Hasan (İlker Aksum) Ramo's brother.
- Sharif (Emre Kınay): He's one of the three big bosses running Istanbul. He was shot dead by Ramo.
- Neco/ Necati (İlhan Şen): Sibel's brother, Fatma/ Fatos husband
- Fatma/ Fatos (Cemre Baysel): Ramo's sister, Neco's wife

=== Supporting characters ===
- Sebahat (Sacide Taşaner): Ramo's mother.
- Afet (Efsane Odag): Hasan's wife
- Görkem Sevindik (Boz): Ramo's supporting friend.

== Seasons ==
Season	Episodes	Originally released		
Season	Episodes	First released	Last released	Network
1	11	January 14, 2020	March 24, 2020	Show TV
2	29	September 18, 2020	April 16, 2021	Show TV

== Episodes ==
=== Season 1 ===
No. overall	No. in series	Title	Directed by	Written by	Original release date
1	1	"Bölüm"	Yağız Alp Akaydın	Yılmaz Şahi	14 January 2020
2	2	"Dikenlerin Üstünde"	Yağız Alp Akaydın	Yılmaz Şahi	21 January 2020
3	3	"Cesaret Edemeyen Esaret Eder"	Yağız Alp Akaydın	Yılmaz Şahi	28 January 2020
4	4	"Yarım Kalan"	Yağız Alp Akaydın	Yılmaz Şahi	4 February 2020
5	5	"Bıçak Sırtı"	Yağız Alp Akaydın	Yılmaz Şahi	11 February 2020
6	6	"Gönül Yarası"	Yağız Alp Akaydın	Yılmaz Şahi	18 February 2020
7	7	"Ağaç Kökünden Yıkılır!"	Yağız Alp Akaydın	Yılmaz Şahi	25 February 2020
8	8	"Yol Ayrımı"	Yağız Alp Akaydın	Yılmaz Şahi	3 March 2020
9	9	"Yangın Yeri"	Yağız Alp Akaydın	Yılmaz Şahi	10 March 2020
10	10	"Bir İsyandır Sevda!"	Yağız Alp Akaydın	Yılmaz Şahi	17 March 2020
11	11	"Kuyunun Dibi"	Yağız Alp Akaydın	Yılmaz Şahi	24 March 2020

=== Season 2 ===
No. overall	No. in series	Title	Directed by	Written by	Original air date	Ref (inTr)
12	1	Hesap Günü	M. Çağatay Tosun	Toprak Karaoğlu, Seda Karaoğlu, Birol Tezcan	18 September 2020	
13	2	Ölüm Sizi Ayırana Kadar	M. Çağatay Tosun	Toprak Karaoğlu, Seda Karaoğlu, Birol Tezcan	25 September 2020	
14	3	İçimizdeki Hain	M. Çağatay Tosun	Toprak Karaoğlu, Seda Karaoğlu, Deniz Karaoğlu, Birol Tezcan	2 October 2020	
15	4	Neden?	M. Çağatay Tosun	Toprak Karaoğlu, Seda Karaoğlu, Deniz Karaoğlu, Birol Tezcan	9 October 2020	
16	5	Can Borcu	M. Çağatay Tosun	Toprak Karaoğlu, Seda Karaoğlu, Deniz Karaoğlu, Birol Tezcan	16 October 2020	
17	6	Katil Kim?	M. Çağatay Tosun	Toprak Karaoğlu, Seda Karaoğlu, Deniz Karaoğlu, Birol Tezcan	23 October 2020	
18	8	Kaman	M. Çağatay Tosun	Toprak Karaoğlu, Seda Karaoğlu, Deniz Karaoğlu, Birol Tezcan	30 October 2020	
19	8	Savaş Başlıyor	M. Çağatay Tosun	Toprak Karaoğlu, Seda Karaoğlu, Deniz Karaoğlu, Birol Tezcan	6 November 2020	
20	9	Hesap Günü	M. Çağatay Tosun	Toprak Karaoğlu, Seda Karaoğlu, Deniz Karaoğlu, Birol Tezcan	13 November 2020	
21	10	Serdengeçti	M. Çağatay Tosun	Toprak Karaoğlu, Seda Karaoğlu, Deniz Karaoğlu, Birol Tezcan	20 November 2020	
22	11	Zor Karar	M. Çağatay Tosun	Toprak Karaoğlu, Seda Karaoğlu, Deniz Karaoğlu, Birol Tezcan	27 November 2020	
23	12	Büyük Baskın	M. Çağatay Tosun	Toprak Karaoğlu, Seda Karaoğlu, Deniz Karaoğlu, Birol Tezcan	4 December 2020	
24	13	İntikam	M. Çağatay Tosun	Toprak Karaoğlu, Seda Karaoğlu, Deniz Karaoğlu, Birol Tezcan	11 December 2020	
25	14	Büyük Hesaplaşma	M. Çağatay Tosun	Toprak Karaoğlu, Seda Karaoğlu, Deniz Karaoğlu, Birol Tezcan	18 December 2020	
26	15	Ölüm Bizi Ayırana Kadar	M. Çağatay Tosun	Toprak Karaoğlu, Seda Karaoğlu, Deniz Karaoğlu, Birol Tezcan	25 December 2020	
27	16	Hakkım İçin Hakkını Ver	M. Çağatay Tosun	Toprak Karaoğlu, Seda Karaoğlu, Deniz Karaoğlu, Birol Tezcan	8 January 2021	
28	17	Son Söz	M. Çağatay Tosun	Toprak Karaoğlu, Seda Karaoğlu, Deniz Karaoğlu, Birol Tezcan	15 January 2021	
29	18	Büyük Patron	M. Çağatay Tosun	Toprak Karaoğlu, Seda Karaoğlu, Deniz Karaoğlu, Birol Tezcan	22 January 2021	
30	19	Normal Bir Gün	M. Çağatay Tosun	Toprak Karaoğlu, Seda Karaoğlu, Deniz Karaoğlu, Birol Tezcan	29 January 2021	
31	20	Kan Borcu	M. Çağatay Tosun	Toprak Karaoğlu, Seda Karaoğlu, Deniz Karaoğlu, Birol Tezcan	5 February 2021	
32	21	Belirsizlik İlkesi	M. Çağatay Tosun	Toprak Karaoğlu, Seda Karaoğlu, Deniz Karaoğlu, Birol Tezcan	12 February 2021	
33	22	Sen Bana Dokunamazsın	M. Çağatay Tosun	Toprak Karaoğlu, Seda Karaoğlu, Deniz Karaoğlu, Birol Tezcan	19 February 2021	
34	23	Kısasa Kısas	M. Çağatay Tosun	Toprak Karaoğlu, Seda Karaoğlu, Deniz Karaoğlu, Birol Tezcan	26 February 2021	
35	24	Büyük Plan	M. Çağatay Tosun	Toprak Karaoğlu, Seda Karaoğlu, Deniz Karaoğlu, Birol Tezcan	5 March 2021	
36	25	Kasaba	M. Çağatay Tosun	Toprak Karaoğlu, Seda Karaoğlu, Deniz Karaoğlu, Birol Tezcan	19 March 2021	
37	26	Sistem	M. Çağatay Tosun	Toprak Karaoğlu, Seda Karaoğlu, Deniz Karaoğlu, Birol Tezcan	26 March 2021	
38	27	Sonun Başlangıcı	M. Çağatay Tosun	Toprak Karaoğlu, Seda Karaoğlu, Deniz Karaoğlu, Birol Tezcan	2 April 2021	
39	28	Gâip	M. Çağatay Tosun	Toprak Karaoğlu, Seda Karaoğlu, Deniz Karaoğlu, Birol Tezcan	9 April 2021	
40	29	Adisyon	M. Çağatay Tosun	Esen Ali Bilen, Merve Engin, Ömer Karasu, Alis Çalışkan	16 April 2021	
