= Nature Of Love =

Turkish television series

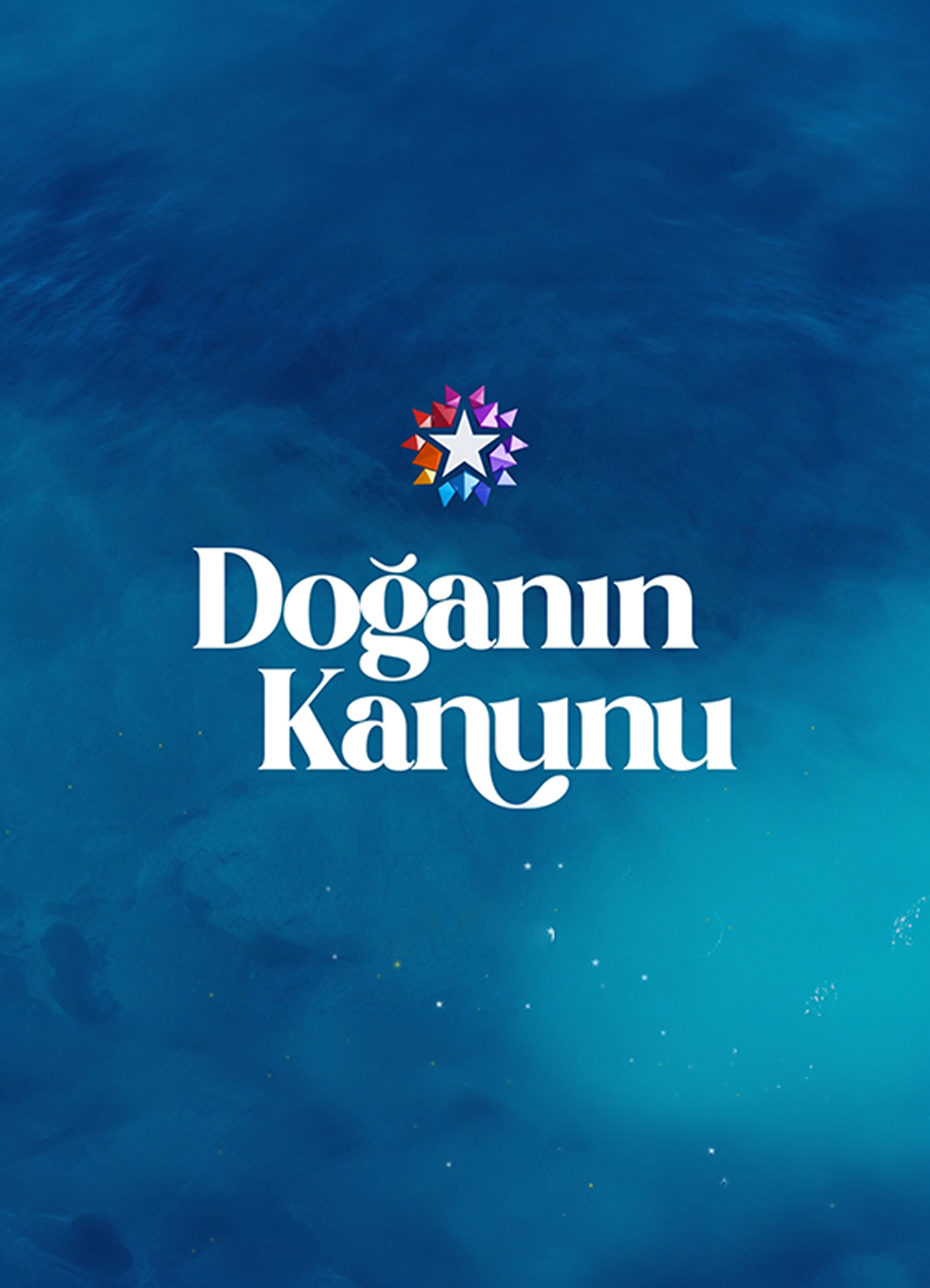
- Genre: Drama; Romantic comedy
- Written by: Barış Erdoğan
- Screenplay by: İlker Arslan
- Directed by: Ali Bilgin; Beste Sultan Kasapoğulları
- Starring: Alperen Duymaz; Özge Yağız
- Country of origin: Turkey
- Original language: Turkish
- No. of series: 1
- No. of episodes: 13

Production
- Running time: 120 minutes
- Production company: Ay Yapım

Original release
- Network: Star TV
- Release: 10 June – 2 September 2026

Doğanın Kanunu (international title: Nature of Love) is a Turkish romantic drama television series produced by Ay Yapım. Directed by Ali Bilgin and Beste Sultan Kasapoğulları, and written by Barış Erdoğan and İlker Arslan, the series stars Özge Yağız and Alperen Duymaz in the lead roles. It premiered on Star TV on 10 June 2026, and is also available for international streaming on Amazon Prime Video.

== Plot ==
Yaman is an idealistic engineer who gets insulted by Doğa, the daughter of a holding company owner, during his most important job interview. Following this deep disappointment, he suffers a tragic, life-altering accident. Five years later, fate unexpectedly brings Yaman and Doğa together again in Urla, Izmir, where Doğa must face her past and prove she is no longer a spoiled girl.

== Cast ==
- Özge Yağız as Doğa Arcalı
- Alperen Duymaz as Yaman Demir
- Hakan Yılmaz as Hulusi Arcalı
- Nur Yazar as Perihan Demir
- Seda Türkmen as Nesrin Demir
- Onur Berk Aslanoğlu as Saffet Demir
- Bartu Zeytinci as Burak
- Kübra Balcan as Vera
- Lara Aslan as Hediye Demir
- Yiğitcan Ergin as Mert Koruner
- Çağla Demir as Büşra
- Müttalip Müjdeci as Kamuran
- Olcay Yusufoğlu as Devin
- Aziz Caner İnan as Eren
- Hülya Duyar as Adile
- Yüksel Ünal as Kazım
- Batuhan Sel as Aytekin
- Asel Çalışkan as Seda Demir

== Production ==
The series is produced by Ay Yapım. Principal photography began in Istanbul before moving to the Urla district of Izmir, where the primary setting of the story takes place.
