= Alperen Duymaz =

Turkish actor and model (born 1992)

- Born: 3 November 1992 (age 34); Ankara, Turkey
- Education: Hacettepe University Ankara State Conservatory
- Occupations: Actor; model
- Years active: 2015–present
- Spouse: Kübra Kelkit (m. 2020)
- Children: 1

Alperen Duymaz (born 3 November 1992) is a Turkish actor and model. He is most famous for his leading roles in the TV series Bodrum Masalı (2016–2017), Çarpışma (2018–2019), Son Yaz (2021), and Leyla: Hayat... Aşk... Adalet... (2024–2025).

== Life and career ==
Duymaz was interested in music and modeling during his high school years. He raduated from Hacettepe University Ankara State Conservatory Theater Department. Duymaz made his television debut with a role in "Tatlı Küçük Yalancılar" which adaptation of Pretty Little Liars. He continued his career with subsequent roles in Acı Aşk and youth series Bodrum Masalı. In 2018, he made his cinematic debut and portrayed the character of Kutay in the historical movie Direniş Karatay. In the same year, he had a recurring role in the crime series Çukur as Emrah. In late 2018 and later in 2019, he was among the main cast of crime series Çarpışma and portrayed Kerem Korkmaz. Since early 2020, he has been starring on Show TV's series Zemheri as Ayaz. In 2021, he started acting in Son Yaz as Akgün.

== Filmography ==
TV/Web series
Year	Title	Role	Notes
2015	Acı Așk	Ali Köklükaya	Leading role
2015–2016	Tatlı Küçük Yalancılar	Cesur	Supporting role
2016–2017	Bodrum Masalı	Ateş Ergüven	Leading role
2018	Çukur	Emrah	Supporting role
2018–2019	Çarpışma	Kerem Korkmaz	Leading role
2020	Zemheri	Ayaz Korkmaz	Leading role
2021	Son Yaz	Akgün Gökalp Taşkın	Leading role
2022	Erkek Severse	Kenan Acarsoy	Leading role
2023	EGO	Erhan Yıldırım	Leading role
2024–2025	Leyla: Hayat... Aşk... Adalet...	Civan Yıldız	Leading role
2026	Nature Of Love	Yaman Demir	Leading role
Cinema and TV movies			Leading role
Year	Title	Role	Notes
2018	Direniş Karatay	Kutay	Leading role
2024	Kül	Metin Ali	Leading role
