= Görkem Sala =

Turkish singer

- Born: 14 February 1992 (age 33); Eskişehir, Turkey
- Genres: EDM, Hip hop
- Occupations: DJ, record producer
- Instrument: DJ
- Years active: 2016–present
- Website: gorkemsala.com.tr

Görkem Sala (born 14 February 1992) is a Turkish singer, DJ, and hip hop artist. He was born in Eskişehir, He graduated from the Middle East Technical University, Department of Interior Architecture. For a period of time, he spent his time on designing after his graduation. He has been appreciated in a very short time with his music style, hip hop and Rap. His first albüm named His Diyarı was released on 13 January 2017 with songs named Jammu (Deluxe) and Salıncak.
