= İlhan Şen =

Turkish actor and model (born 1987)

- Born: 19 December 1987 (age 38); Shumen, Bulgaria
- Education: Yıldız Technical University (construction engineering)
- Occupations: Actor, model
- Years active: 2018–present (as actor)
- Website: www.ilhansen.net

İlhan Şen (born 19 December 1987) is a Turkish actor and former model. He is known for his work in Şahin Tepesi (2018), Ramo (2020), and Forget Me If You Can (2021).

== Life and career ==
Şen was born on 19 December 1987 in Bulgaria to a Turk family. His family was forced to immigrate from Bulgaria to Turkey when he was two years old.

Since childhood, he played as professional young sportsman in basketball and football clubs (Fenerbahçe, etc.). After finishing his primary and secondary education in Istanbul, he studied in Yıldız Technical University, graduating with a degree in construction engineering.

He started modelling at the age of 17. He participated in the Best Model of Turkey competition in 2008 and received the "Best Swimwear Model" award. In 2009, he was back to the competition and this time he earned the first place and won the "Best Model of Turkey 2009" title. He represented Turkey at the "Best Model of The World 2009" which was held in Sofia, Bulgaria, and became "Best Model of Europe".

After working as a model, he started taking acting lessons and made his debut with a role in the historical drama Mehmed: Bir Cihan Fatihi in 2018. He subsequently appeared in four more supporting roles in Şahin Tepesi (2018), Eşkıya Dünyaya Hükümdar Olmaz (2019), Ramo (2020), and Seni Çok Bekledim (2020). He had leading roles in the romantic comedy series Aşk Mantık İntikam, opposite Burcu Özberk, and in the drama series Sevmek Zamanı, Safir and Halef: Köklerin Çağrısı (2025).

== Filmography ==
Television
Year	Title	Role	Notes	Network
2018	Mehmed: Bir Cihan Fatihi	Şehzade Alâaddin	Supporting role	Kanal D
2018	Şahin Tepesi	Mete	Supporting role	ATV
2019	Eşkıya Dünyaya Hükümdar Olmaz	Ferman Façalı	Supporting role	ATV
2020	Ramo	Neco (Necati) Yıldırım	Supporting role	Show TV
2021	Seni Çok Bekledim	Erol Eren	Supporting role	Star TV
2021–2022	Aşk Mantık İntikam	Ozan Korfalı	Leading role	FOX
2022	Sevmek Zamanı	Kağan Kerımoğlu	Leading role	ATV
2023	Safir	Ateş Gülsoy	Leading role	ATV
2025–2026	Halef: Köklerin Çağrısı	Serhat Yelduran	Leading role	NOW

Film
Year	Title	Role	Notes
2011	Perspective	Shell 001	Short film
2020	Biz Böyleyiz	Male model	Supporting role
2024	Aşk Filmi	Uzay	Leading role
2024	Tek Başına	Tamer	Leading role
2026	Djinn Wedding (Cinlerin Düğünü)	Deniz	Platform Competition, Toronto
