= Görkem Sevindik =

Turkish actor

- Born: 17 October 1988 (age 38); Adana, Turkey
- Education: Müjdat Gezen Art Center
- Occupation: Actor
- Years active: 2010–present
- Spouse: Kübra Siyahdemir (m. 2020; div. 2024)
- Children: 1

Görkem Sevindik, born 17 October 1988 in Adana. is a Turkish actor. He studied acting at Müjdat Gezen Art Center. He made his television debut in 2010 by portraying the character of Pusat in hit crime series Kurtlar Vadisi Pusu. After briefly appearing in Kalbim Seni Seçti, another breakthrough in his career was in the popular military series Söz. In 2020, Sevindik joined the cast of the crime series Ramo, acting alongside Murat Yıldırım and Esra Bilgiç. Sevindik also received widespread acclaim for his role as Ali in Ateş Kuşları ('Firebirds').

== Filmography ==
Television
Year	Title	Role	Notes
2010–2016	Kurtlar Vadisi Pusu	Pusat Çakir	
2017–2019	Söz	Üstçavuş Mücahit / Serdengeçti (Keşanlı)	Supporting role
2020	Ramo	Boz	Supporting role
2021	Mavera	Sarı Saltık	Supporting role
2021	Kahraman Babam	Uğur Eser	Leading role
2023–2024	Ateş Kuşları	Ali	Leading role
2025–2026	Eşref Rüya	Kadir Yanık	Leading role

Web film and series
Year	Title	Role	Notes
2022	Erkek Severse	Oktay Durmaz	Leading role
2025	Kız Babası	Şahin	Leading role
2026	Ayrılık da Sevdaya Dahil	Destan Yanıklar	Supporting role
2026-	Eşref Tek	Kadir Yanık	Supporting role

Film
Year	Title	Role	Notes
2022	Bandırma Füze Kulübü	Kemal	Supporting role

== Awards ==
- 2014 Magazine Journalists Association, Promising Actor
- 2018 Turkey Youth Awards, Best Supporting Actor
- 2018 Ayaklıgazete Awards, Best Supporting Actor
- 2018 Media and Art Awards, Best Supporting Actor
- 2019 Istanbul Aydın University Awards, Best Supporting Actor

== Personal life ==
Sevindik was married to basketball player Kübra Siyahdemir, and the couple had one son in 2020. In 2024, it was reported that the couple divorced.
