= 1st Yeşilçam Awards =

Award ceremony in Turkey celebrating achievement in film

- Date: March 24, 2008
- Location: Lütfi Kırdar Congress & Exhibition Hall
- Country: Turkey
- Presented by: Turkish Foundation of Cinema and Audiovisual Culture (TÜRSAK); Beyoğlu Municipality
- Website: http://www.yesilcamodulleri.com.tr/

Television/radio coverage
- Network: NTV Turkey

The 1st Yeşilçam Awards (Turkish: 1. Yeşilçam Ödülleri), presented by the Turkish Foundation of Cinema and Audiovisual Culture (TÜRSAK) and Beyoğlu Municipality, honored the best Turkish films of 2007 and took place on March 24, 2008, at the Lütfi Kırdar Congress and Exhibition Hall in Istanbul, Turkey.

== Awards and nominations ==
=== Best Film Award ===
- Winner: Bliss (Turkish: Mutluluk) directed by Abdullah Oğuz
  - At the Bar (Turkish: Barda) directed by Serdar Akar
  - The White Angel (Turkish: Beyaz Melek) directed by Mahsun Kırmızıgül
  - The Edge of Heaven (Turkish: Yaşamın Kıyısında) directed by Fatih Akın
  - Egg (Turkish: Yumurta) directed by Semih Kaplanoğlu

=== Best Director Award ===
- Winner: Fatih Akın for The Edge of Heaven (Turkish: Yaşamın Kıyısında)
  - Serdar Akar for At the Bar (Turkish: Barda)
  - Barış Pirhasan for Adam and the Devil (Turkish: Adem'in Trenleri)
  - Abdullah Oğuz for Bliss (Turkish: Mutluluk)
  - Semih Kaplanoğlu for Egg (Turkish: Yumurta)

=== Best Actor Award ===
- Winner: Şener Şen for For Love and Honor (Turkish: Kabadayı)
  - Haluk Bilginer for Police (Turkish: Polis)
  - Nejat İşler for At the Bar (Turkish: Barda) and Egg (Turkish: Yumurta)
  - Uğur Polat for Fog and the Night (Turkish: Sis ve Gece)
  - Yetkin Dikinciler for Nazim Hikmet: Blue Eyed Giant (Turkish: Mavi Gözlü Dev)

=== Best Actress Award ===
- Winner: Özgü Namal for Bliss (Turkish: Mutluluk)
  - Fadik Sevin Atasoy for Zeynep's Eight Days (Turkish: Zeynep'in 8 Günü)
  - Nurgül Yeşilçay for Adam and the Devil (Turkish: Adem'in Trenleri) and The Edge of Heaven (Turkish: Yaşamın Kıyısında)
  - Ülkü Duru for İyi Seneler Londra

=== Best Supporting Actor Award ===
- Winner: Tuncel Kurtiz for The Edge of Heaven (Turkish: Yaşamın Kıyısında)
  - İlyas Salman for Fog and the Night (Turkish: Sis ve Gece)
  - Uğur Polat for Nazim Hikmet: Blue Eyed Giant (Turkish: Mavi Gözlü Dev)
  - Rasim Öztekin for For Love and Honor (Turkish: Kabadayı)
  - Talat Bulut for Bliss (Turkish: Mutluluk)

=== Best Supporting Actress Award ===
- Winner: Nursel Köse for The Edge of Heaven (Turkish: Yaşamın Kıyısında)
  - Derya Alabora for Adam and the Devil (Turkish: Adem'in Trenleri)
  - Lale Mansur for Bliss (Turkish: Mutluluk)
  - Melisa Sözen for Wish Me Luck (Turkish: Bana Şans Dile)
  - Özge Özberk for Nazim Hikmet: Blue Eyed Giant (Turkish: Mavi Gözlü Dev)

=== Best Cinematography Award ===
- Winner: Mirsad Heroviç for Bliss (Turkish: Mutluluk)
  - Eyüp Boz for Janjan
  - Gökhan Atılmış for Fog and the Night (Turkish: Sis ve Gece)
  - Özgür Eken for Egg (Turkish: Yumurta)
  - Rainer Klausman for The Edge of Heaven (Turkish: Yaşamın Kıyısında)

=== Best Screenplay Award ===
- Winner: Fatih Akın for The Edge of Heaven (Turkish: Yaşamın Kıyısında)
  - İsmail Doruk for Adam and the Devil (Turkish: Adem'in Trenleri)
  - Kubilay Tuncer for Bliss (Turkish: Mutluluk)
  - Semih Kaplanoğlu & Orçun Köksal for Egg (Turkish: Yumurta)
  - Yavuz Turgul for For Love and Honor (Turkish: Kabadayı)

=== Best Music Award ===
- Winner: Zülfü Livaneli for Bliss (Turkish: Mutluluk)
  - Fazıl Say for İyi Seneler Londra
  - Mahsun Kırmızıgül & Yıldıray Gürgen for The White Angel (Turkish: Beyaz Melek)
  - Selim Demirlen for At the Bar (Turkish: Barda)
  - Shantel for The Edge of Heaven (Turkish: Yaşamın Kıyısında)

=== Digiturk Young Talent Award ===
- Winner: Saadet Işıl Aksoy for Egg (Turkish: Yumurta)
  - Ali Atay for İyi Seneler Londra
  - Aslı Tandoğan for For Love and Honor (Turkish: Kabadayı)
  - Ferit Kaya for Nazim Hikmet: Blue Eyed Giant (Turkish: Mavi Gözlü Dev)
  - Fıratcan Aydın for Adam and the Devil (Turkish: Adem'in Trenleri)

=== Turkcell First Film Award ===
- Winner: The White Angel (Turkish: Beyaz Melek) directed by Mahsun Kırmızıgül
  - İyi Seneler Londra directed by Berkun Oya
  - Wish Me Luck (Turkish: Bana Şans Dile) directed by Çağan Irmak
  - The Last Ottoman: Knockout Ali (Turkish: Son Osmanlı Yandım Ali) directed by Mustafa Şevki Doğan
  - Police (Turkish: Polis) directed by Onur Ünlü

== See also ==
- Yeşilçam Award
- Turkish films of 2007
- 2007 in film
