= Cüneyt Mete =

Turkish actor

- Born: 9 September 1970 (age 55); Ankara, Turkey
- Education: Ankara University
- Occupation: Actor
- Years active: 1991–present
- Spouse: Şeyma Korkmaz (m. 2019)
- Children: 2
- Awards: list

Cüneyt Mete (born 9 September 1970) is a Turkish actor.

== Life and career ==
Cüneyt Mete was born on 9 September 1970 in İzmir to a family from Şavşat. He later moved to Ankara, and is father to twins Cem and Ferhan. He is a graduate of Ankara University State Conservatory with a degree in theatre studies. He then actively took part in the Ankara State Theatre plays. Between 2016–2018, he starred in the ATV series Aşk ve Mavi, playing the role of Cemal Göreçki. He played in fantasy child series "Kayıp Prenses" with Çağla Şimşek, Yıldız Çağrı Atiksoy.

With Fadik Sevin Atasoy, Evrim Doğan, Güzin Alkan, he played in Dudaktan Kalbe based from classic novel and youth series Kardeşlerim.

== Personal life ==
In May 2019, Mete married actress Şeyma Korkmaz, who starred in the TV series Beni Affet between 2011–2018.

== Filmography ==
=== Film and TV series ===
Year	Title	Role	Notes
1991	Varyemez	Policeman	Film, director: Orhan Aksoy
1994	En Büyük Numara		Guest actor, short film, director: Abdülkadir Ceylan Ede
2007	Köprü		Supporting role, TV series, director: Çağatay Tosun & Sadullah Şentürk
2007	Kurtlar Vadisi Terör	Muro	Supporting role, TV series, director: Sadullah Şentürk
2007	Yeni Evli	Poyraz	Supporting role, TV series, director: Alper Tunga Özdemir
2007	Zincir Bozan	Ali Şener	Supporting role, film, director: Atıl İnaç
2008	Kayıp Prenses	Arun	Supporting role, TV series, director: Özlem Bayşu
2008	Dudaktan Kalbe	(42-44 episodes)	Guest role, TV series, director: Andaç Haznedaroğlu
2009	Ayrılık	Sait	Supporting role, TV series, director: Onur Tan
2010–2014	Unutma Beni	Kenan	Supporting role, TV series, director: Nuri Sessiz, Mihriban Şahin, Hülya Özyıldırım, Ayşe Tügen, Gülsen U. Erişdi, Hakan Şahin
2011–2012	Beni Affet	Cesur Karabey	Supporting role, TV series, director: Gülşen Erişdi, Altan Yücel, Gürsel Ateş, Mevlüt Taşcı
2015–2016	Aşkların En Güzeli	Selçuk	Supporting role, TV series, director: Ayşegül Yılmaz, Hülya Özyıldırım, Gürsel Ateş, Altan Dönmez
2016–2018	Aşk ve Mavi	Cemal Göreçki	Leading role, TV series, director: Reyhan Pekar, Hakan Arslan
2021–present	Kardeşlerim	Orhan	Leading role, TV series, director: Serkan Birinci

=== TV programs ===
Year	Title	Network	References
2018	Kim Milyoner Olmak İster	ATV	
2018	Dizi TV	ATV	
2021	Cüneyt Mete - YouTube Special Interview Episode 1	ATV	
2021	Cüneyt Mete - YouTube Special Interview Episode 2	ATV	
2021	Fadik Sevin Atasoy & Cüneyt Mete ile Karavan Sohbetleri YouTube Special	ATV	
2022	Snop Magazin		

== Theatre ==
Year	Title	Role	Venue
1995–1996	Maymun Davası	Townsperson	İzmir State Theatre
1996–1997	Hüznün Coşkusu		Bursa State Theatre
1996–1997	Vuslat Kavuşma		Bursa State Theatre
1996–1997	Düğün Ya Da Davul		Bursa State Theatre
1997–1998	Üç Kağıtçı		Adana State Theatre
1998–1999	V. Frank		Adana State Theatre
1998–1999	Soytarılar		Adana State Theatre
1999–2000	Mağaradakiler		Adana State Theatre
1999–2000	Katip Çıkmazı		Adana State Theatre
2000–2001	Canlı Maymun Lokantası		Adana State Theatre
2001–2002	Kızılırmak		Adana State Theatre
2001–2002	Bağdat Hatunu		Adana State Theatre
2002–2003	Shakespeare Zorda		Adana State Theatre
2002–2003	İçerdekiler		Adana State Theatre
2002–2003	Cimri		Adana State Theatre
2003–2004	Figaro'nun Düğünü		Adana State Theatre
2003–2004	Hamlet		Ankara State Theatre
2004–2005	Ramazan ile Jülide		Ankara State Theatre
2005–2006	Salome		Ankara State Theatre
2006–2007	Cadı Kazanı		Ankara State Theatre
2007–2008	Tek Kişilik Şehir		Ankara State Theatre
2010–2011	Haydi Karına Koş	Mary	Ankara State Theatre
2010–2011	Büyük Sultan		Ankara State Theatre
2015–2016	Grönholm Methodu		Ankara State Theatre
2015–2016	Terapi Ötesi		Aysa Production Theatre
2019	Kapan–Sleuth	Milo Tindle	Ankara State Theatre

== Awards and nominations ==
Year	Award	Category	Result
2007–2008	Art Institution	Best Actor	Won
