= 44th Antalya Golden Orange Film Festival =

2007 Turkish film festival

- Festival Poster by Emrah Yucel
- Location: Antalya, Turkey
- Awards: Golden Orange
- Festival date: October 19-28, 2007
- Website: http://www.aksav.org.tr/en/

Antalya Film Festival
- 45th 43rd

The 44th Antalya Golden Orange Film Festival (Turkish: 44. Antalya Altın Portakal Film Festivali) was held from October 19 to 28 2007 in Antalya, Turkey. Awards were presented in the 44th Antalya Golden Orange Festival in 20 categories of three competition divisions and in the 3rd Eurasia Film Festival in 4 categories. The award ceremony took place on October 28, 2007 at the Glass Pyramid Sabancı Congress and Exhibition Center in the downtown of Antalya. It was run in conjunction with the 3rd International Eurasia Film Festival.

== Jury ==
Following cinema professionals formed the juries:

=== Antalya Golden Orange Film Festival ===
==== Feature film competition ====
- Genco Erkal, chairman
- Mehmet Açar
- Zeki Demirkubuz
- Mahinur Ergun
- Uğur İçbak
- Nida Karabol
- Hale Soygazi
- Cem Yılmaz
- Emrah Yücel

==== Documentary film competition ====
- Ertuğrul Karslıoğlu, chairman
- Tuba Akyol
- Coşkun Aral
- Canan Obay
- Ludmilla Cvikova

==== Short subject competition ====
- Semir Aslanyürek, chairman
- Ebru Ceylan
- Cansel Elçin
- Balçiçek Pamir
- Danny Lennon

== Nominees ==
=== Antalya Golden Orange Film Festival ===
Following 12 national films (in alphabetical order) were nominated to compete for the Golden Orange Award:

- Adem'in Trenleri directed by Barış Pirhasan
- İyi Seneler Londra by Berkun Oya
- Janjan by Aydın Sayman
- Bliss by Abdullah Oğuz
- Mülteci by Reis Çelik
- Münferit by Dersu Yavuz Altun
- Rıza by Tayfun Pirselimoğlu
- Saklı Yüzler by Handan İpekçi
- Sis ve Gece by Turgut Yasalar
- The Edge of Heaven by Fatih Akın
- Egg by Semih Kaplanoğlu
- Zeynep's Eight Days by Cemal Şan

== Awards ==
=== Antalya Golden Orange Film Festival ===
==== Feature film competition ====
Prize		Winner	For/By
Best Picture	TRY 300,000	Yumurta	Semih Kaplanoğlu
Best Director	TRY 30,000	Fatih Akın	Yaşamın Kıyısında
Best Screenplay	TRY 20,000	Semih Kaplanoğlu, Orçun Köksal	Yumurta
Best Music	TRY 20,000	Zülfü Livaneli	Mutluluk
Best Actress		Özgü Namal	Mutluluk
Best Actor		Murat Han	Mutluluk
Best Camera Direction	USD 30,000	Özgür Eken	Yumurta
Best Art Direction		Naz Ereyda	Yumurta
Best Supporting Actress		Nursel Köse	Yaşamın Kıyısında
Best Supporting Actor		Tuncel Kurtiz	Yaşamın Kıyısında
Best Cinematography		Andrew Bird	Yaşamın Kıyısında
Best Film Editing		Şafak Stüdyo	Sis ve Gece
Best Makeup and Hairdress		Songül İbrahim, Fatma Kardeş	Mutluluk
Best Visual Effects		not awarded	
Best Costume Design		Naz Erayda	Yumurta
Best Sound Design and Sound Mix		Orçun Korluca	Mutluluk

==== Jury special awards ====
Prize		Winner	For/By
Dr. Avni Tolunay Award	USD 30,000	Yaşamın Kıyısında	Fatih Akın
Behlül Dal Digitürk Award for Young Talent	USD 25,000	Saadet Işıl Aksoy	Yumurta

==== Documentary film competition ====
Prize		Winner	Directed by
Best Picture	TRY 7,500	not awarded	

==== Short subject competition ====
Prize		Winner	Directed by
Best Picture	TRY 7,500	Hoşgeldin Bebek	Serhat Koca

==== NETPAC Jury Award ====
Prize	Winner	Directed by
Best Picture	Yumurta	Semih Kaplanoğlu
