= Begüm Birgören =

Turkish actress (born 1982)

- Born: Ayşe Begüm Birgören; 20 September 1982 (age 43); Eskişehir, Turkey
- Occupation: Actress
- Years active: 1997–present
- Spouse: Mehmet Cemil (m. 2020)

Begüm Birgören (born 20 September 1982) is a Turkish actress. She is best known for series Kırık Kanatlar, Ömre Bedel, Kaçak.

== Early life ==
Begüm Birgören was born on 20 September 1982 in Eskişehir, Turkey. Her maternal family is of Circassian origin. Her father is a teacher, and her mother is an economist. The actress has stated that she has been fascinated in acting since she was 13. She completed her education in Bahçeşehir University Visual Arts and Visual Communication Design. She completed her master's degree at Film and Drama Department at Kadir Has University.

== Career ==
Birgören started her acting career in 1997, when she made her debut in the series Beşibiryerde. In 2003, she appeared in the series Pilli Bebek alongside Mehmet Günsür and depicted the character of Olcay and fantasy child series Mavi Kolye and portrayed the character of Nil and then in series Arapsaçı.

In 2005, she made her debut in the series Seher Vakti as her first leading role and portrayed the character of Melike alongside Berk Hakman

In 2006, she made her debut in the period series Kırık Kanatlar as a main character and portrayed the character of Elvan alongside Berk Hakman. In 2007, she appeared in the period series Kara Yılan which was directed by Yağmur Taylan, she portrayed the character of Elvan alongside Engin Akyürek.

In 2008, she portrayed in comedy Mert ile Gert and depicted the character of Aslı alongside Emre Altuğ.

In 2009, she portrayed the character of Ömür in the series Ömre Bedel alongside Özge Özder. She played in "Ağır Roman Yeni Dünya" based from novel. She played in crime series "Kaçak" alongside Berk Hakman.

In 2013, she received the award of Best Supporting Actress at Lions Theatre Awards.

In 2016, she had a leading role in the youth crime series Umuda Kelepçe Vurulmaz and portrayed the character of İnci, it was directed by Cemal Şan, it starred Özge Özder, Mert Yazıcıoğlu, Melisa Şenolsun and Burak Dakak.

In 2022, She played in fantasy film Osman Sekiz. She was cast in youth series "Tozlu Yaka".

She made her cinematic debut in the film Sen Ne Dilersen and depicted the character of Young Eleni alongside Okan Yalabık. She appeared in films Nokta, Türkan, Göl Zamanı. She played in the movie Ali'nin Sekiz Günü directed by Cemal Şan. She played in film "Kendime İyi Bak" alongside Aslı Tandoğan.

== Personal life ==
Birgören dated Mehmet Cemil. The couple got engaged in June 2020. They got married on 18 October 2020.

== Filmography ==
=== Television ===
TV shows
Year	Title	Role
1997	Beşibiryerde	
2003	Pilli Bebek	Olcay
2003	Mavi Kolye	Nil
2004	Arapsaçı	
2005	Seher Vakti	Melike
2006	Kırık Kanatlar	Ayşe
2007	Karayılan	Elvan
2008	Mert ile Gert	Nazlı
2009–2011	Ömre Bedel	Ömür
2012	Ağır Roman Yeni Dünya	Eylül
2013–2014	Kaçak	Merve
2015	Bir Deniz Hikayesi	Zeynep
2016–2017	Umuda Kelepçe Vurulmaz	İnci
2019	Vurgun	Asya
2021	Uzak Şehrin Masalı	Sonay
2022	Son Nefesime Kadar	Emel
2022	Tozluyaka	Nesrin Koçak
2026–present	Mehmed: Fetihler Sultanı	Gülşah Hatun

=== Films ===
Films
Year	Title	Role
2005	Sen Ne Dilersen	Young Eleni
2008	Nokta	Elif
2008	Ali'nin Sekiz Günü	Zeynep
2011	Türkan	
2013	Göl Zamanı	Elif
2014	Kendime İyi Bak	Yeşim
2022	Osman Sekiz	
