= Ferit Kaya =

Turkish actor of Kurdish descent (born 1984)

- Born: 24 February 1984 (age 42); Eğil, Diyarbakır, Turkey
- Occupation: Actor
- Years active: 2006–present
- Notable work: Resul (Öyle Bir Geçer Zaman ki); Uğur (Kavak Yelleri); Erdal (Arka Sokaklar)
- Awards: 19th Ankara Film Festival (2008) – Promising New Young Actor (Mavi Gözlü Dev)

Ferit Kaya (born 24 February 1984) is a Turkish actor of Kurdish descent.

== Life and career ==
Kaya is a graduate of Mimar Sinan Fine Arts University State Conservatory with a degree in theatre studies. He first became known through his role in the TV series Kavak Yelleri (2007) but rose to prominence after appearing in Öyle Bir Geçer Zaman ki (2010) as Resul. In 2012, he had a recurring role in Kanal D's series Kötü Yol.

Ferit Kaya has continued his cinematic career and starred alongside Ata Demirer in the 2015 movie Niyazi Gül Dörtnala. He then briefly joined the cast of Arka Sokaklar and appeared in the series Familya. His breakthrough with his role as Murtaza in Çukur and as Zafer in the Netflix original series Fatma.

== Filmography ==
Year	Title	Role
2006	Erkekler Ağlamaz	
2007	Menekşe ile Halil	Sami
2007	Pazar - Bir Ticaret Masalı	Serhat
2007	Yersiz Yurtsuz	Veysel
2007	Zeynep'in Sekiz Günü	Young guy
2008	Ali'nin Sekiz Günü	Tinerci
2008	Butimar	
2008	Güneşin Oğlu	Orkun
2008	Karamel	Osman
2008	Merdiven Altı	Young guy
2008–2009	Kavak Yelleri	Uğur
2009	Kollama	Policeman
2009	Beş Şehir	Coşkun
2009	Bu Kalp Seni Unutur mu?	İdris
2009	Gecenin Kanatları	Selim
2009	Kül ve Ateş	İbrahim
2009	Kısa'ca Ramazan: Kamil İnsan	Asım
2009	Mukadderat	İşçi Kardeş
2010	Sessiz Çocukları	
2010–2012	Öyle Bir Geçer Zaman ki	Resul
2011	Muhteşem Yüzyıl	Ayas Pasha
2012	Bu Son Olsun	Kovboy Ali
2012	Kötü Yol	İhsan
2013	Kayıp	Bekir Çimen
2014	Annemin Şarkısı	Commissioner
2014	Emanet	Ekrem Kozaklı
2015	Muhteşem Yüzyıl: Kösem	Kara Sait
2015	Niyazi Gül Dörtnala	Mahmut
2015	Öyle ya da Böyle	Hakan
2015–2017	Aşk ve Mavi	Faysal Koçak
2016	Boşu Bir Yerde	Erkan
2016	Familya	
2016	Sahipli	
2016	Arka Sokaklar	Erdal Boyatlı
2017	Adı Efsane	Ozan
2017	Dayan Yüreğim	Cengiz
2018	Bir Deli Rüzgâr	Kemancı Ali
2018	Ölümlü Dünya	Arif
2019	Kuzgun	Cihan
2019	7. Koğuştaki Mucize	Ali
2019–2021	Çukur	Feriğin Murtaza
2021	Fatma	Zafer Yılmaz
2021	Mavera	Mervan
2021	Alparslan: Büyük Selçuklu	Erbaskan Bey
2022	Heartsong	Damat
2024–2026	Uzak Şehir	Demir Baybars
2025	Sürgünler	
2025	Uykucu	Afro
2026	Aşk ve Taht	Celaleddin
