= Emrah =

Emrah is a Turkish masculine given name. It is a form of Emre.

People named Emrah include:

- Erzurumlu Emrah, literally "Emrah from Erzurum" (1775–1854), Turkish folk poet
- Emrah (singer), Turkish singerand actor
- Emrah Başsan (born 1992), Turkish footballer
- Emrah Cebeci (born 1989), Turkish footballer
- Emrah Eren (born 1978), Turkish footballer
- Emrah İpek (born 1971), Turkish pop singer
- Emrah Karaçay
- Emrah Karaduman
- Emrah Kiraz (born 1987), Turkish footballer
- Emrah Klimenta
- Emrah Kuş (born 1988), Turkish Greco-Roman wrestler
- Emrah Ormanoğlu
- Emrah Safa Gürkan, Turkish public intellectual and historian
- Emrah Tuncel
- Emrah Yucel (born 1968), Turkish artist
