= Simge =

Simge is a Turkish given name for females, meaning symbol. Notable people with the name include:

- Simge Küçükyavuz, Turkish-American industrial engineer
- Simge Sağın (born 1981), Turkish singer
- Simge Selçuk (born 1975), Turkish actress
- Simge Şebnem Aköz (born 1991), Turkish volleyball player
- Simge Tertemiz (born 1988), Turkish model and TV hostess
