= 43rd Antalya Golden Orange Film Festival =

2006 Turkish film festival

- Festival Poster by Emrah Yucel
- Location: Antalya, Turkey
- Awards: Golden Orange
- Festival date: September 16–23, 2006
- Website: http://www.aksav.org.tr/en/

Antalya Film Festival
- 44th 42nd

The 43rd Antalya Golden Orange Film Festival (Turkish: 43. Antalya Altın Portakal Film Festivali) was held from September 16 to 23 2006 in Antalya, Turkey. The venue for the award ceremony on September 23, 2007 was moved from the open air amphitheater Aspendos to a smaller one at the Glass Pyramid Sabancı Congress and Exhibition Center in the downtown of Antalya due to bad weather conditions. It was run in conjunction with the 2nd International Eurasia Film Festival.

== Awards ==
=== National feature film competition ===
Prize		Winner	For/By
Best Picture	TRY 300,000	Kader	Zeki Demirkubuz
Best Director	TRY 30,000	Nuri Bilge Ceylan	İklimler
Best Screenplay	TRY 20,000	Önder Çakar	Takva
Best Music	TRY 20,000	Gökçe Akçelik	Takva
Best Actress		Sibel Kekilli	Eve Dönüş
Best Actor		Erkan Can	Takva
Best Camera Direction		Soykut Turan	Takva
Best Art Direction		Erol Taştan	Takva
Best Supporting Actress		Nazan Kesal	İklimler
Best Supporting Actor		Civan Canova	Eve Dönüş
Best Cinematography		Ayhan Ergürsel	İklimler
Best Film Editing		Sinefekt	İklimler, Takva
Best Makeup and Hairdress		Himmet İnkaya	Takva
Best Visual Effects		Uğur Erbaş	Cenneti Beklerken
Best Costume Design		Ayten Şenyurt	Takva
Best Sound Design and Sound Mix		İsmail Karataş	İklimler

=== Jury special awards ===
Prize		Winner	For/By
Dr. Avni Tolunay Jury Special Award		Takva	Sevil Demirci
Behlül Dal Digitürk Jury Special Award for Young Talent	USD 25,000	Ufuk Bayraktar	Kader

=== National documentary film competition ===
Prize		Winner	Directed by
Best Picture	TRY 7,500	Gündelikçi	Emel Çelebi
