= 45th Antalya Golden Orange Film Festival =

2008 Turkish film festival

- Festival Poster by Emrah Yucel
- Location: Antalya, Turkey
- Awards: Golden Orange
- Festival date: October 10-19, 2008
- Website: http://www.aksav.org.tr/en/

Antalya Film Festival
- 46th 44th

The 45th Antalya Golden Orange Film Festival (Turkish: 45. Antalya Altın Portakal Film Festivali) was held from October 10 to 19 2008 in Antalya, Turkey. Awards were presented in the 45th Antalya Golden Orange Festival in 20 categories of three competition divisions and in the 4th Eurasia Film Festival in 4 categories. The award ceremony took place on October 19, 2008 at the Konyaaltı Amphitheatre in the downtown of Antalya. It was run in conjunction with the 4th International Eurasia Film Festival.

== Jury ==
Following cinema professionals formed the juries:

=== Antalya Golden Orange Film Festival ===
==== Feature film competition ====
- Tuncel Kurtiz, actor (chairman)
- Ali Akdeniz, producer
- Serdar Akar, director
- Ayda Aksel, actress
- Fadik Sevin Atasoy, actress
- Ömer Faruk Sorak, director
- Sevin Okyay, playwright
- Çetin Tunca, camera director
- Güven Kıraç, actor

==== Documentary film competition ====
- Güneş Karabuda, director (chairman)
- Demet Evgar, actress
- Oğuz Makal, lecturer
- Hasan Özgen, director
- Tayfun Talipoğlu, journalist/writer

==== Short subject competition ====
- Selim Demirdelen, director (chairman)
- Zafer Algöz, actor
- Ulaş İnaç, director
- Leyla Özalp, producer
- Özge Özberk, actress

== Nominees ==
=== Antalya Golden Orange Film Festival ===
Following 15 national films (in alphabetical order) were nominated to compete for the Golden Orange Award:

- Başka Semtin Çocukları directed by Aydın Bulut
- Bunu Gerçekten Yapmalı mıyım? by İsmail Necmi
- Dilber'in Sekiz Günü by Cemal Şan
- Gitmek by Hüseyin Karabey
- Gökten Üç Elma Düştü by Raşit Çelikezer
- Gölge by Mehmet Güreli
- Hayat Var by Reha Erdem
- İki Çizgi by Selim Evci
- Nokta by Derviş Zaim
- Pandora'nın Kutusu by Yeşim Ustaoğlu
- Pazar: Bir Ticaret Masalı by Ben Hopkins
- Son Cellat by Şahin Gök
- Süt by Semih Kaplanoğlu
- Ulak by Çağan Irmak
- Üç Maymun by Nuri Bilge Ceylan
- Vicdan by Erden Kıral

== Awards ==
=== Antalya Golden Orange Film Festival ===
==== Feature film competition ====
Prize		Winner	For/By
Best Picture	TRY 300,000	Pazar-Bir Ticaret Masalı	Ben Hopkins
Best Director	TRY 30,000	Derviş Zaim	Nokta
Best Screenplay	TRY 20,000	Ben Hopkins	Pazar-Bir Ticaret Masalı
Best Music	TRY 20,000	Mazlum Çimen	Nokta
Best Actress		Nurgül Yeşilçay	Vicdan
Best Actor		Tayanç Ayaydın	Pazar-Bir Ticaret Masalı
Best Camera Direction	USD 30,000	Zekeriya Kurtuluş	Vicdan
Best Art Direction		Türker İşçi	Başka Semtin Çocukları
Best Supporting Actress		Övül Avkıran	Pandora'nın Kutusu
Best Supporting Actor		Volga Sorgu Tekinoğlu	Başka Semtin Çocukları - Gitmek
Best Cinematography		Mustafa Preşava	Vicdan
Best Film Editing		Fono Film	Gökten Üç Elma Düştü - Vicdan
Best Makeup and Hairdress		Vesey Üsten	Vicdan
Best Visual Effects		Burak Balkan	Üç Maymun
Best Costume Design		Zeynep Sırlıkaya	Pazar-Bir Ticaret Masalı
Best Sound Design and Sound Mix		Kostasvi Variopiotis	Nokta

==== Jury special awards ====
Prize		Winner	For/By
Dr. Avni Tolunay Yurtiçi Kargo Award	USD 30,000	Nokta	Derviş Zaim
Behlül Dal Digitürk Award for Young Talent	USD 25,000	Aydın Bulut	Başka Semtin Çocukları

==== Documentary film competition ====
Prize		Winner	Directed by
Best Picture	TRY 10,000	Adakale Sözlerim Çoktur	İsmet Arasan

==== Short subject competition ====
Prize		Winner	Directed by
Best Picture	TRY 7,500	Gemeinschaft	Özlem Akın
