= Burak Hakkı =

Turkish actor

- Born: 23 May 1972 (age 54); Istanbul, Turkey
- Education: Istanbul University Faculty of Economics Department of Econometrics
- Occupation: Actor
- Height: 1.92 m (6 ft 4 in)
- Spouse: Sema Şimşek (m. 2001; div. 2012)
- Children: 1
- Awards: Best Model of Turkey (1994)

Burak Hakkı ([buːˈɾak hakˈkɯ]; born 23 May 1972) is a Turkish actor and model.

== Biography ==
After the Ottoman Empire collapsed, his paternal family which is of Turkish descent immigrated from Komotini and Thessaloniki. He won the Best Model of Turkey in 1994. He was a basketball player in Nasaş Basketball Club.

Hakkı is best known for his roles as Hüseyin Kenan in Dudaktan Kalbe based on the classic novel by Reşat Nuri Güntekin and as Kayqubad I the Seljuq Sultan of Rûm in Diriliş: Ertuğrul and as Ali in Kaybolan Yıllar.

Hakkı acted in "Bir Günah Gibi" series which not a direct adaptation of second novel "Kurt Seyt ve Murka" by Nermin Bezmen. It cancelled due to low ratings series. He played in series Yeniden Çalıkuşu which is not a direct adaptation of the classic novel Çalıkuşu by Reşat Nuri Güntekin. But the series cancelled.

== Filmography ==
Film
Year	Title	Role	Notes
2000	Aşk Aynı Adreste		TV film
2002	Paşalı	Hüseyin	TV film
2005	Son Yüzleşme		TV films
2006	Dünyayı Kurtaran Adam'ın Oğlu	Gökmen	
2007	O Kadın	Bülent	
2008	Semum	Volkan Karaca	
2015	Detay	Burak	
2016	Sessiz Yalanlar	Murat	TV film
2020	Kısır Döngü		
2021	Geal	Hitman	
2021	ΣΜΥΡΝΗ ΜΟΥ ΑΓΑΠΗΜΕΝΗ	Halil	
2022	Afacanlar: İş Başa Düştü		
2023	Hava Muhalefeti		
Web Series
Year	Title	Role	Notes
2022	Η ΓΕΦΥΡΑ	Kenan Karaman	
2023	Kapı		
2023	La Pasión Turca		
Tv Series
Year	Title	Role	Notes
2000	Zehirli Çiçek	Ekrem	
2001-2002	Günah	Tahsin	
2002-2003	Kırık Ayna	Sidar	
2003-2004	Gurbet Kadını	Murat	
2005	Yeniden Çalıkuşu	Kenan	
2006-2007	Kaybolan Yıllar	Ali	
2007-2009	Dudaktan Kalbe	Hüseyin Kenan Gün	
2009	Maskeli Balo	Mehmet Kılıç	
2010	Küçük Kadınlar	Doğaç(guest)	
2010-2011	Kızım Nerede	Kaan	
2011	Bir Günah Gibi	Enver	
2012	Mavi Kelebekler	Mirza Turkovic	
2012-2013	Yer Gök Aşk	Ali Ömer	
2013	Aşk Ekmek Hayaller	Erdinç	
2014	3 Arkadaş	Galip Bey	
2015	Mayıs Kraliçesi	Yiğit	
2017	Diriliş: Ertuğrul	Sultan Aladdin	
2018	İkizler Memo-Can	Onur Alkanlar	
2023	Üvey Anne	Kudret	
Music video
Year	Artist	Title	Notes
1997	Sibel Can	Kanasın	
Theatre
Year	Title	Role	Notes
2017	Kiklos		
