= Su Burcu Yazgı Coşkun =

Turkish actress (born 2005)

- Born: 15 April 2005 (age 21); Istanbul, Turkey
- Education: Pera Fine Arts High School
- Occupation: Actress
- Years active: 2011–present

Su Burcu Yazgı Coşkun ( born 15 April 2005) is a Turkish film and television actress. She is most famous for her role as Asiye Eren in the TV series Kardeşlerim (2021–2024). She won a Golden Butterfly Award for it.

== Life and career ==
She was born on 15 April 2005 in Istanbul. Her maternal family is of Albanian descent. She took her first step in her acting career in 2011. She is studying in the theatre department of Pera Fine Arts High School.

Her breakthrough came with the character "Zeynep" who can read minds in popular fantasy series Sana Bir Sır Vereceğim alongside Demet Özdemir, Ekin Koç, Berk Cankat, and Burak Can. She played in series such as Kuzgun, Aşk Yeniden, Karadayı and Kırmızı Oda.

She is mainly known for playing the lead role in the series Kardeşlerim. She won numerous awards for this, including 2 awards at the Golden Butterfly Awards ceremony in the categories of "Rising Stars" and "Best TV Series Couple" with Onur Seyit Yaran on 4 December 2022.

She then went on to star in Bir Gece Masalı opposite Burak Deniz, the star of one of her earlier projects, Bizim Hikaye. Harper's BAZAAR Women of the Year awarded her the "Rising Star of the Year" for this role in 2024, and Jury's Special Award gave her and Deniz the award for "Best Couple" in 2025.

== Filmography ==
=== Television ===
Year	Title	Role
2011	Farklı Boyut	
2012	Kalbim Dört Mevsim	
2012–2014	Karadayı	Neşe
2013–2014	Sana Bir Sır Vereceğim	Zeynep
2014	Günahkâr	Young Saliha
2015–2016	Aşk Yeniden	Elif Su
2017	Kadın	Young Bahar
2017–2018	Bizim Hikaye	Ceylan
2017	Kara Yazı	Songül
2019	Kuzgun	Naz
2020	Kırmızı Oda	Güler
2021–2024	Kardeşlerim	Asiye Eren
2024–2025	Bir Gece Masalı	Canfeza Yılmaz (née Kilimci)

=== Film ===
Year	Title	Role	Notes
2012	Küçük Kalpler: Kalbin Dili	Elif	TV film
2012	Dabbe 3: Bir Cin Vakası	Burcu	
2013	Sen Üzülme	Mine	TV film
2018	Bizi Hatırla	İrem	
2021	Beni Çok Sev	Selen	Netflix film
