= Peri Masalı =

Turkish film

Peri Masali (film)
- Directed by: Biray Dalkiran
- Screenplay by: Biray Dalkiran
- Produced by: Burhan Asaf Şafak
- Starring: Burcu Kıratlı; Emre Kızılırmak
- Cinematography: Biray Dalkiran, Mehmet Yardim, Ümit Özyurt
- Edited by: Ahmet Karaagaç
- Music by: Gürkan Çakici
- Release date: 28 March 2014
- Running time: 90 minutes
- Country: Turkey
- Language: Turkish

Peri Masali (means Fairy Tale) is a 2014 Turkish romantic drama film inspired by a real story. Starring Burcu Kıratlı and Emre Kızılırmak in lead roles. The film received good reviews & was an instant commercial success. Also noted as one of Burcu Kıratlı best performances made her win Best New Actress Award at Digital Media Awards in 2015. The film is directed by Biray Dalkıran music composed by Gürkan Çakici & cinematography done by Biray Dalkiran, Mehmet Yardim, Ümit Özyurt In 2018 Peri Masalı has been selected as one of the Best Turkish Love Films of 2000.

== Plot ==
The film tells the story of a cancer survivor named Peri, a gentle soul with a love of music, a violin player, & her boyfriend, Mert. Mert and Peri are deeply in love and have been together for a long time. But Peri develops the fatal disease. In the meantime, Mert proposes to Peri. Peri tells Mert her only condition before accepting the proposal. Mert will try to fulfill the wish of the woman he loves. The film was a tale of unconditional love & a generation gap.

== Cast ==
Artist	Role
Burcu Kıratlı	Peri
Emre Kizilirmak	Mert
Sedef Sahin	Yildiz
Alp Korkmaz	Selçuk
Sema Moritz	Melek Harikases
Çetin Altay	Emir
Itir Esen	Gül
Selman Okumus	Imam
Ahmet Arslan	Mert (as child)
Esra Açik	Hemsire
Semra Saglam	Cemile
Ismail Yardim	Emir (as child)
Fatma Kurt	Emir'in Esi

== Awards and nominations ==
Awards
Year	Awards Ceremony	Category	Project	Actress	Result	Refs
2015	Digital Media Awards	Best New Actress Award	Peri Masali	Burcu Kıratlı	Won	
