= Eve Düşen Yıldırım =

Turkish romantic drama television series

- Written by: Meryem Gül
- Directed by: Feride Kaytan
- Starring: Murat Han; Gizem Karaca; Seda Akman; Mehmet Can Micizolu; Burcu Tuna
- Country of origin: Turkey
- Original language: Turkish
- No. of seasons: 2
- No. of episodes: 22

Production
- Producer: Fatih Aksoy
- Running time: 90 minutes (average)
- Production company: Medyapım

Original release
- Network: Show TV
- Release: March 9 – October 15, 2012

Eve Düşen Yıldırım, is a Turkish romantic drama television series. It is adaptation of Nahit Sırrı Örik's 1936 novel of same name. The series originally aired from March 9, 2012 to October 15, 2012. It ran for two seasons on Show TV.

== Cast ==
- Murat Han (Namık)
- Gizem Karaca (Muazzez)
- Seda Akman (Şayeste)
- Mehmetcan Minciözlü (Sait)
- Şencan Güleryüz (Halil)
- Suzan Aksoy (Perihan)
- Buket Dereoğlu (Pınar)
- Nazan Diper (Emine)

== International broadcasts ==
Country	Network	Premiere date	Original Name
Northern Cyprus	Show TV	March 9, 2012	Eve Düşen Yıldırım
North Macedonia	Kanal 5	2013	Опасна убавина
Israel	Viva +	2012	יופי מסוכן
Pakistan	Express Entertainment	March 25, 2013	Fareb-Ek Haseen Dhoka
Greece	Mega Channel	July 15, 2013	Θανάσιμη Ομορφιά
Bulgaria	Diema Family	November 18, 2013	Опасна красота
Saudi Arabia	MBC4	April 12, 2015	اليتيمه
