= Celil Nalçakan =

Turkish actor and singer (born 1978)

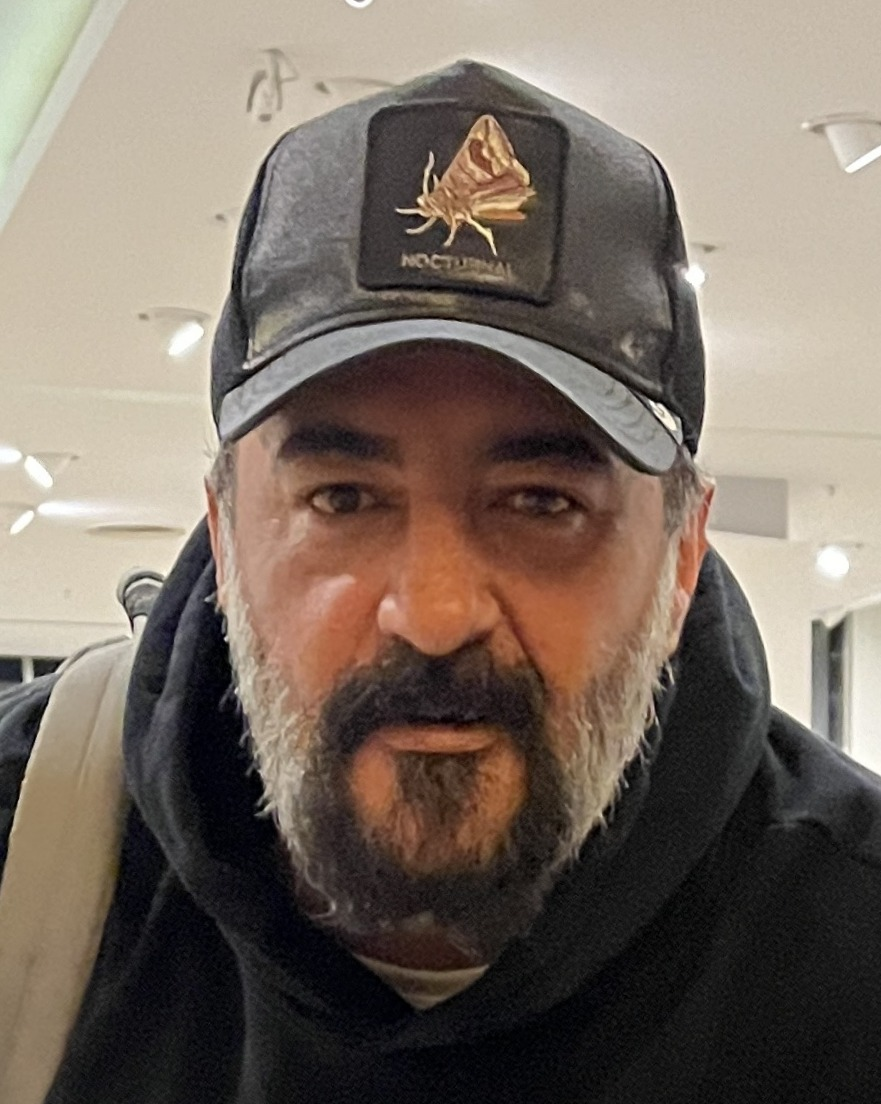
- Nalçakan in 2022
- Born: 10 June 1978 (age 48); Sivas, Turkey
- Occupations: Actor, Singer
- Years active: 2006–present

Celil Nalçakan (born 10 June 1978) is a Turkish actor and Singer.

== Life and career ==
Nalçakan was born on 10 June 1978 in Sivas. His mother was a teacher and his father was an electrical technician. He has a younger sister. After graduating from high school, he enrolled in the Geological Engineering department at Sivas Cumhuriyet University. However, after 7 years, he left the school and joined the Sivas State Theatre. Later, he started studying tourism and hotel management at Balıkesir University, but continued with his theatre studies there as well. He passed Türvak's exam and settled in Istanbul and started studying acting there.

He started his career in 2006 by making his television debut in the popular series Sıla. He then had supporting roles in the series Kış Masalı and Hanımın Çiftliği which based from classic novel but came to prominence with his role in Bitmeyen Şarkı. He briefly appeared in the series İntikam adaptation of Revenge, before doing a program titled Şişenin Dibi with Algı Eke on netd.com.

Between 2015 and 2017, he played the role of Zülfikar in the series Poyraz Karayel and spin off film Poyraz Karayel: Küresel Sermaye. As of 2021, he has been cast in a leading role in the youth series Kardeşlerim, which is set to premiere on ATV. He appeared in many popular films.

== Filmography ==
Television
Year	Title	Role	Notes
2006	Sıla	Dilaver	
2009	Kış Masalı		
2011	Hanımın Çiftliği	Habip	
2011	Bitmeyen Şarkı	Necip	
2011	Keşanlı Ali Destanı	Hüseyin	
2013	İntikam	Adem Karakuş	
2013	Galip Derviş	Selim	
2013	Vicdan	Faruk	
2015–2017	Poyraz Karayel	Zülfikar Ülgen	
2017–2018	Hayati ve Diğerleri	Hayati Başkomiser	
2019	Bir Aile Hikayesi	Cem Güneş	
2020	Kırmızı Oda	Garip	
2021–2024	Kardeşlerim	Akif Atakul	
2025	Sustalı Ceylan	Bekri Vezirli	
2025–2026	Rüya Gibi	Tarık	
2026–present	Taşacak Bu Deniz	Timur Valkov	
Streaming series and films
Year	Title	Role	Notes
2023	Bursa Bülbülü	Osman	
Cinema
Year	Title	Role	Notes
2012	Çanakkale 1915	Şefik Aker	
2017	Poyraz Karayel: Küresel Sermaye	Zülfikar Ülgen	
2020	Ben Bir Denizim	Umut Evirgen	
2020	Karakomik Filmler 2: Emanet		
2021	Kimya		
2023	Prestij Meselesi		
TBA	Hiç		
