= Kınalı Kar =

Turkish series

- Directed by: Taner Akvardar
- Starring: Emrah; Ozlem Conker; Engin Şenkan; Mustafa Avkıran
- Country of origin: Turkey
- No. of episodes: 90

Production
- Running time: approximately 58 minutes

Original release
- Network: Kanal D
- Release: September 12, 2002 – December 24, 2004

Kınalı Kar is a miniseries portraying the love stories of several people in the fictional Turkish village of Kınalı Kar, most notably Ali and Nazar.

== Overview ==
Kınalı Kar was a miniseries filmed in Bursa, Turkey from 2002 to 2004. Directed by Taner Akvardar , Kınalı Kar was a romantic drama about the young teacher Ali from the big city (played by Emrah) whose teaching assignment is given to him in a remote village in Turkey. While it takes some time for Ali to adjust to the village life, he quickly makes some friends. During the early stages of the series, he sees a young girl in the village named Nazar (played by Ozlem Conker), who falls in love with him.

== Side Plots ==
=== The Four Sisters ===
Nazar, Sumru, Fadik, and Pinar are the four children of Halil Bey and Sureyya Hanim. Nazar is the oldest and the role model. She is the ambassador of the family and the most mature of the girls. Sumru is the next oldest - she is jealous of all the attention that Nazar gets and can't wait for her to get married so she can marry. (In Kinali Kar tradition, marriage rights take precedence with age. The oldest girl marries first, and if she doesn't marry, none of her siblings can marry.) Fadik is the third oldest. She is the funny, quirky, immature, and innocent daughter. She doesn't have any agendas with anybody except Demir. She is madly in love with Demir. Last, but not least, there is Pinar, the youngest daughter. She is the most educated of the daughters and the most mature, next to Nazar. She eventually takes over Ali Ogretmen's post as the village teacher after he dies.

=== The Extended Family ===
During Ali's stay in Kinali Kar, this is the family he becomes close with. Omer and Mihriban are brother and sister living in the same house by convenience. Omer is a widower and has a son named Ali. Mihriban is a newlywed living with her husband Recep. Often during the series, Ali would be hanging out here with the family, drinking tea and having conversation.

== Love Stories ==
=== Kamber and Zehra ===
During the love affair between Ali and Nazar, there are other people involved in relationships. The most famous of these other affairs is the one between Kamber and Zehra. When they were young, Kamber and Zehra were in a relationship that was torn apart. A rich snob from the local town named Davut came into the village and asked for permission from Zehra's parents to marry Zehra. Everything happened really quickly and Kamber couldn't stop the events that took place. Davut whisked away his new bride and moved her to the town with him. As a result, Kamber went crazy - literally. He is the village's most educated person despite his lunacy. He constantly thinks of Zehra and would do anything to get her back.

=== Mehmet and Pınar ===
Two school friends develop a long term long-distance relationship despite Mehmet going away to college and meeting other girls.

=== Demir and Fadik ===
Cabbar Aga calls him "Yetim Demir" (meaning Orphan Demir) as Demir's parents died when he was very little. Fortunately for him, the Bey's family adopted him as one of their own children. Demir actually has a thing for Nazar. But when she marries Cabbar Ağa, he gets convinced by Sureyya Hanım to marry her younger daughter Fadik so that he can start a business with the land he will receive from Halil Bey. She promises him that she will personally give Nazar to him when the time is right. (This never happens, nor was meant to happen.) He reluctantly marries Fadik and eventually learns to love her towards the end of the series.

=== Kahveci Yusuf and Sumru ===
These two have a secret love affair that very few people know about. Sumru is a flirty girl who likes the attention that the coffee house owner Yusuf gives her. These two love birds consummate their affair in the barn of Sumru's family.

=== Mesut and Lamia ===
Mesut is introduced as a hard-working dependable laborer in Demir's olive oil factory. Lamia is Cabbar Aga's housemaid, who secretly has a crush on Cabbar Aga. Seyit, Cabbar Aga's right-hand man, approaches Mesut and asks him to provide information on what Demir's plans are with the factory. During all this, Mesut meets Cabbar Aga and coincidentally meets Lamia as well. He is instantly mesmerized by her and wants to have a relationship with her. However, she does not find him as interesting as he finds her. Later in the series, when Cabbar Aga marries Lamia, he wants a baby. Ironically, it is Mesut who is "hired" to provide the seed to impregnate Lamia. When Lamia realizes that Cabbar Aga still loves Nazar, she turns to Mesut and starts to reciprocate the love that he has towards her.

== Season 1: 2002 - 2003 ==
=== The Early Days ===
Ali Ogretmen comes to the village of Kınalı Kar for the first time. This is where he first meets Nazar. Ali has some difficulty getting acclimated with the village lifestyle having lived his whole life in Istanbul. He is able to make friends quickly with Kamber, Recep, and Ömer. Sureyya Hanim is Nazar's mother and at this stage of the miniseries, she is the village's mayor. She is an evil woman who has selfish plans of marrying off her daughters in a way that keeps the maximum amount of land in the family's possession. For Nazar, she plans on giving her to the upper village's mayor (Cabbar Aga) in marriage without her consent. Nazar does not want to marry Cabbar Aga, and to protest this (and delay the eventual marriage) she cuts her hair very short. In Kinali Kar's traditions the marrying girl must have at least shoulder-length hair. Sureyya Hanim sees Ali Ogretmen as a distraction to Nazar and forbids her from seeing him.

=== The School Fire ===
To make life difficult for Ali, and perhaps force him to leave the village, she has Kahveci Yusuf set fire on the village's school. The school burns to the ground. Despite this, Ali Ogretmen does not leave the village. He is determined to educate the students of Kinali Kar. As a Teacher's Day present, Kamber, Omer, and Recep build a brand new school for Ali Ogretmen and the children of Kinali Kar.

=== Cabbar's Evil Plan ===
Cabbar Aga intends to marry Nazar as soon as possible and wants to force the hand of Sureyya Hanim, so he has his men work day and night and closes down the main river that leads to Kinali Kar from the upper village. Kinali Kar experiences drought-like conditions with no running water. Cabbar Aga states that if Nazar were to come to him, he will open up the river for Kinali Kar. This plan of Cabbar Aga's was absurd and cruel. Nazar would never go - she is in love with Ali Ogretmen.

=== The Past Returns ===
Ali's ex-girlfriend Ayca comes in from Istanbul to visit and see what Ali is up to and if he has adjusted to village life. One night they are hanging out in Kamber's shack in the forest, and it gets too late for them to return to the village. At this time, Ali is sick with flu-like conditions and so they are forced to spend the night in Kamber's place.

=== The Turning Point ===
In fact, to stay warm, Ayca invites Ali to sleep together in the same bed - so that's what they do. As a coincidence that night, for some reason, Nazar wants to talk with Ali Ogretmen and when she can't find him in his house, she goes out to look for him to Kamber's shack in the forest. When she arrives and opens the door, she is shocked when she sees Ali and Ayca in the same bed! In disgust, she rushes out and runs back to the village, gets on her horse, and rides to the upper village to Cabbar Aga's lair. This changes everything in the series.

=== Cabbar Aga, Nazar, Ali, and Ece ===
Ali Ogretmen tries to get Nazar back from the evil clutches of Cabbar Aga, but to no avail. Cabbar organizes a quick wedding and marries Nazar. In fact, Ali shows up uninvited and tries to prevent the whole thing from taking place, but he is too late. After the wedding, Cabbar Aga confesses to Nazar that he is impotent in the honeymoon room. Ali and Nazar secretly meet a few times after the wedding, but it isn't the same as before. During this time, a new character is introduced to the series: Ece, the village doctor played by Sinemis Candemir. She develops a crush for Ali and is jealous of him whenever she hears of the stories of the love between Ali and Nazar. In the season finale, she admits her love for him to his face and asks him to love her, even if it's one one-thousandth times the love he has for Nazar. In the same episode, Nazar announces to Cabbar Aga that she is pregnant from Ali!

== Season 2: 2003 - 2004 ==
The second season takes place five years after the time from when the first season ended. By this time, Nazar has given birth to a baby boy, Efe and he is about five years old. In the meantime, Ali has married the village doctor, Ece even though his heart still beats for Nazar. In a strange irony, Ali doesn't know that he has a son by Nazar. During the early part of the season, Ali gets into an altercation with his wife and subsequently divorces her. Nazar divorces Cabbar Aga towards the latter stages of the season, and eventually Ali and Nazar reunite and get married. However, in the season finale, during Ali and Nazar's wedding, Cabbar Aga shows up. He shoots and kills Ali to put a sad ending on what would have been a storybook finish.

== Season 3: 2004 - 2005 ==
Life goes on. Cabbar Ağa is in jail, but manages a way to escape. He lives in exile near the hills around Kınalı Kar. His henchmen help him survive with daily rations of food and water. He wants to exact revenge on Nazar for the divorce and for the time he spent in jail. In the village, Nazar adjusts to a new life without Ali. She has given birth to another boy by Ali, and is now a single mother of two. A new dam construction project will begin in Kınalı Kar that has brought to the village new characters. Among these is the engineer who has an interest in Nazar. Unfortunately for him, she is not interested in him and as a result, a relationship does not blossom. Regardless, the engineer protects her from Cabbar Ağa's attacks. Later on, Cabbar Ağa commits suicide on a snowy hill outside of Kınalı Kar and Kamber and Zehra get married.
