= Dilber's Eight Days =

- Theatrical release poster
- Directed by: Cemal Şan
- Written by: Cemal Şan
- Produced by: Tekin Doğan
- Starring: Nesrin Cavadzade; Fırat Tanış; Mustafa Üstündağ; Aslıhan Erguvan; Arzu Tan Bayraktutan
- Cinematography: Cengiz Uzun
- Edited by: Şenol Şentürk
- Music by: Nail Yurtsever
- Production company: Şan Film
- Distributed by: Medyavizyon
- Release date: October 2008 (Antalya)
- Running time: 107 minutes
- Country: Turkey
- Language: Turkish

Dilber's Eight Days (Turkish: Dilber'in Sekiz Günü) is a 2008 Turkish drama film, written and directed by Cemal Şan. It stars Nesrin Cevadzade as a young village woman who leaves with a stranger after being spurned by her lover. The film, which went on nationwide general release across Turkey on April 24, 2009, was shown in competition at the 45th Antalya Golden Orange Film Festival (October 10–19, 2008) and was nominated at the 3rd Yeşilçam Awards (March 23, 2010). It is the second part of the Love Trilogy of films which includes Zeynep's Eight Days (2007) and Ali's Eight Days (2009).

== Plot ==
Dilber lives with her family in a very poor eastern village. Her only dream is to marry her childhood lover, Ali. But when she finds out that it will not happen, she goes crazy and locks herself in her family's barn. Then she makes everybody know that she will marry the first guy who proposes and will not leave the barn until that happens. One day, a limping man comes to the village. He is alone and has heard that there is a girl in that village who is ready to marry him.

== Production ==
The film was shot on location in Mardin, Turkey.
