= Özge Özder =

Turkish actress (born 1978)

- Born: 1 April 1978 (age 48); Ankara, Turkey
- Occupation: Actress
- Years active: 1996–present
- Spouses: Tansel Öngel (m. 2007; div. 2010) Sinan Güleryüz (m. 2018)
- Children: 1

Özge Özder (born 1 April 1978) is a Turkish actress best known for her role as Cavidan in the series Dudaktan Kalbe, based on the classic novel, as Emel the comedy drama series Umutsuz Ev Kadınları and as Kıvılcım in Mucize Doktor.

== Life and career ==
Özder was born in 1978 in Ankara. Her maternal family is of Circassian descent. She founded Bana Göz Kulak Ol with Aslı Tandoğan. She finished her middle and high school studies at the Ankara Private Yükseliş College. It was in those years when she first became interested in theatre. In 1996, she passed the conservatory exams and enrolled in Bilkent University, before continuing her education at Hacettepe University State Conservatory. In 2000, she graduated from Ankara State Conservatory with a degree in theatre studies and started her professional career by joining BKM theatre. In 2001, she continued her career on stage.

Between 2004 and 2006, she was a regular on Kanal D's Haziran Gecesi and her portrayal of the character Lale was praised by fans and critics. Her breakthrough came with Show TV's Dudaktan Kalbe, in which she had the role of Princess Cavidan. Despite her successful television and cinema career, she continued her career on stage and in 2005 joined Istanbul City Theatres. For her role in Three Sisters as Natasha, she was given the Bedia Muvahhit, Afife Jale and Sadri Alışık theatre awards. She was nominated for an Afife Jale award for her role as Lena in Leonce and Lena. She was then cast in 2011 in Fox's Umutsuz Ev Kadınları as Emel, a role she continued to play until 2014. She then appeared in the series Kehribar as Adile Yarımcalı. Subsequently, she played the role of Perihan in the Umuda Kelepçe Vurulmaz series for two years. Between 2019 and 2020, she had a leading role in Mucize Doktor, an adaptation of the Korean TV series Good Doctor. She played the role of Kιvιlcιm Boysal in the series.

== Theatre ==
- Twelfth Night: William Shakespeare – Istanbul City Theatres – 2015
- Kes ve Kaç: Peter Horsler – Istanbul City Theatres – 2014
- Lost in Yonkers: Neil Simon – Tiyatrokare – 2013
- Miss Julie: August Strindberg – Talimhane Theatre – 2012
- Play: Samuel Beckett – Istanbul City Theatres – 2012
- No Exit: Jean-Paul Sartre – Istanbul City Theatres – 2011
- Marat/Sade: Peter Weiss – Istanbul City Theatres – 2010
- Leonce and Lena: Georg Büchner – Istanbul City Theatres – 2008
- Three Sisters: Anton Chekhov – Istanbul City Theatres – 2008
- Ceza Kanunu: Ahmet Nuri Sekizinci – Istanbul City Theatres – 2007
- Düş Oyuncakları: Shakespeare Kolaj – Istanbul City Theatres – 2006
- The Father: August Strindberg – Istanbul City Theatres – 2006
- Klaksonlar Borazanlar Bırtlar: Dario Fo – Bakırköy Municipality Theatres – 2004
- Barış Ormanında Yarış: Fikret Terzi – Bakırköy Municipality Theatres – 2003
- A Midsummer Night's Dream: William Shakespeare – Bakırköy Municipality Theatres – 2003
- İki Kişilik Hırgür: Eugène Ionesco – Bakırköy Municipality Theatres – 2002
- Cephede Piknik Yok: Fernando Arrabal – Bakırköy Municipality Theatres – (2002)

== Filmography ==
=== Films ===
- Leydi Di - 2024
- Başka Semtin Çocukları – 2008 Gül
- Sıfır Dediğimde – 2007 Genç Müberra
- Sınav – 2006 – Candan
- Umut Adası

=== Web Series ===
- Tertemiz - 2024
- Jet Sosyete – 2019 – Sema (episode 43)
- Ulan İstanbul – 2014 – Sevilay Karam

=== TV Series ===
- Gecenin Ucunda – 2022– (Sara)
- Sadakatsiz – 2020–2022 (Derya)
- Mucize Doktor – 2019–2020 – Kıvılcım
- Rüya - 2017
- Umuda Kelepçe Vurulmaz – 2016–2017 – Perihan
- Kehribar – 2016 – Adele Yarımcalı
- Umutsuz Ev Kadınları – 2011–2014 – Emel
- Ömre Bedel – 2009–2010 – Aylin
- Dudaktan Kalbe – 2007–2009 – Cavidan Meriçoğlu Gün
- İyi ki Varsın – 2006 – Aslı
- Emret Komutanım – 2005 – Sultan
- Uy Başuma Gelenler – 2004
- Haziran Gecesi – 2004 – Lale
- İyi Aile Robotu – 2002 – Çağla
- Aşkın Mucizeleri – 2004
- Estağfurullah Yokuşu – 2003 – Didem
- Hayat A.Ş. – 2003
- Çifte Bela – 2001
- Yeditepe İstanbul – 2001 (guest appearance)
- Dadı – 2000 (guest)
- Sonbahar Kadınları – 1998
- Ferhunde Hanımlar (guest)

== Discography ==
Singles

- Senle Ben (feat. Sinan Güleryüz]) (2018)
- Biz Bize (feat. Sinan Güleryüz) (2019)
- Senle Ben (feat. Sinan Güleryüz, Alican Sandık) [Remix Edition] (2020)
- Gidersen Eğer (feat. Sinan Güleryüz) (2020)
- Gidersen Eğer (feat. Sinan Güleryüz, Alican Sandık) [Remix Edition] (2021)
