= Kardeşlerim =

2021 Turkish family Comedy television series

- Genre: Romance; Teen Drama; Tragedy
- Written by: Gül Abus Semerci
- Directed by: Serkan Birinci
- Starring: see cast
- Music by: Alp Yenier
- Country of origin: Turkey
- Original language: Turkish
- No. of seasons: 4
- No. of episodes: 132

Production
- Producer: Nazli Hepturk
- Production location: Istanbul
- Running time: 125 to 150 minutes
- Production company: NGM Media

Original release
- Network: ATV
- Release: February 20, 2021 – June 8, 2024

Kardeşlerim (International title: For My Family or My Siblings) is a Turkish television series starring Celil Nalçakan., Yiğit Koçak, Lizge Cömert, Su Burcu Yazgı Coşkun, Onur Seyit Yaran, Fadik Sevin Atasoy, Melis Minkari and Recep Usta. The drama premiered on ATV on February 20, 2021, and concluded with four seasons on June 8, 2024.

The series was a huge success in its native Turkey and was internationally broadcast in Spain on Antena 3, Albania on TV Klan, Chile on TVN, South Africa on eExtra and e.tv and Kazakhstan on Qazaqstan TV and on Iraq newline.tv and in Lebanon on MTV Lebanon, Morocco 2M TV are also broadcast internationally

Yahya Hassen

== Synopsis ==
The story revolves around Kadir, Ömer, Asiye, and Emel, four siblings who lose their parents due to unfortunate circumstances and try to build their lives going forward with each other's support. Despite their ups and downs, they are always there for each other.

It further explores eight young people who fall in love despite having been born in opposite and seemingly irreconcilable worlds; The four main couples are Kadir and Melisa, Ömer and Süsen, Aybike and Berk, Doruk and Asiye, all of whom will have to overcome difficult obstacles and reveal painful secrets to fully experience the love that destiny has in store for them.

== Episodes ==
Season	Episodes	Originally released	
Season	Episodes	First released	Last released
1	18	February 20, 2021	June 19, 2021
2	38	September 11, 2021	June 11, 2022
3	38	September 3, 2022	June 10, 2023
4	38	September 9, 2023	June 8, 2024

== Cast and characters ==
=== Main ===
- Akif Atakul (Celil Nalçakan), (Seasons 1-4)

Main antagonist (Seasons 1-2) turned anti-hero (Seasons 3-4). Suzan’s and Nebahat's ex-husband , father to Doruk, Kaan, and Melisa Atakul. Ex-step father to Harika. Legal guardian of Bahar. A businessman and former owner of Ataman College, he is the murderer of Veli Eren. He caused the death of Kenan Manyasli and Resul Özkaya unintentionally. During the end of Season 2, Akif goes bankrupt, then slowly regains his wealth and becomes more of a comic relief anti-hero as the series progresses. He also helps the Eren family in some circumstances. His true fate was revealed during the finale.

- Ömer Eren (Yiğit Koçak), (Seasons 1-4)

Main protagonist from season 2 onwards following Kadir's death; Biological son of Suzan Manyaslı and Ahmet Yılmaz, maternal half brother of Harika, paternal half brother of Yasmin and Sarp; Adopted son of Hatice & Veli Eren, Kadir & Emel’s adopted brother and Asiye's adopted twin brother, Süsen’s husband, Ayşe‘s ex-boyfriend, Dora, Leyla and Lidya's love interest. Despite being introverted, he is known to be an excellent student and is willing to defend his siblings from any harm. During the beginning of Season 3, Ömer adopts a more arrogant, greedy, and fake-rich lifestyle much to the dismay of his adoptive sisters; he later goes back to his old self. He becomes Süsen's boyfriend at the end of Season 2 and married her in the last episode.

- Asiye Eren (Su Burcu Yazgı Coşkun), (Seasons 1-4)

Main protagonist and only lead female alongside Kadir and Omer in Seasons 1-4. Daughter of Veli and Hatice Eren, sister of Kadir, Emel, and adoptive twin-sister of Ömer. Doruk's girlfriend. Mother and Sister to the Eren family. Asiye was a smart and talented student and singer. She aspired to become a lawyer and was one of the most innocent in the series.

- Aybike Özkaya (Melis Minkari), (Seasons 1-4)

The smart and sarcastic daughter of Şengül and Orhan, younger sister of Oğulcan, older sister of Umutcan, paternal half sister of Cansu, biological cousin of Asiye, Emel, and Kadir, adoptive cousin of Ömer, and becomes Berk’s wife in the last episode. Hides the truth from Berk that he was bought as a child.

- Berk Özkaya/Cetin (Recep Usta), (Seasons 1-4)

Elif’s twin-brother, Doruk's best friend, Gökhan’s and Serpil’s biological estranged son, Resul, and Ayla's adopted son who they bought from his biological mom, Aybike's boyfriend. He was Ömer, Oğulcan and Kadir's rival and a minor antagonist at the beginning of the first season. After falling in love with Aybike he becomes friends with Eren family. His biological mother was accidentally killed by his adoptive mother Ayla.

- Süsen Eren (Lizge Cömert), (Seasons 1-4)

Süreyya’s daughter, Ömer's wife. Harika's bestfriend, Kadir's ex-girlfriend. Süsen is introduced as an attractive, wealthy, and initially somewhat spoiled young woman. She comes from a wealthy family and, at least at first, lives a privileged life that contrasts with the struggles of the main Eren siblings.

Despite her affluent background and social circle, Süsen carries emotional loneliness and vulnerability beneath her confident exterior. She has no siblings or close family around her, which contributes to her deeper emotional layers and her desire for real connection and belonging.

Character Development & Personality

- Before meeting Ömer: Süsen is portrayed as confident and sometimes dismissive of people outside her social class. She often acts with a mixture of privilege and uncertainty.
- After meeting Ömer: Her love for Ömer brings out a softer and more compassionate side of her personality. She begins to change and reveal a more grounded, considerate self that was always inside her.
- Süsen is honest at heart but struggles with serious secrets and guilt that threaten her relationships. These inner conflicts add depth to her character and create drama in the storyline.

Witnessed the death of Kadir and kept it a secret. Caused Leyla Barçın’s death unintentionally and also kept it a secret. In Season 4, she develops a rivalry with Lidya, Tolga’s cousin.

- Sarp Yılmaz (Atakan Ozkaya), (Seasons 3-4)

Main antagonist (Seasons 3-4). Ahmet and Şevval's son, Yasmin's brother, Ömer's paternal half-brother, Ayaz’s cousin, Sevgi’s grandson, Lidya’s ex-boyfriend and Cansu’s boyfriend. During Season 3, Sarp replaces Emir and Tolga as the school bully always going head-to-head with his half-brother, Ömer. Sarp likes to frame his peers for pleasure. He later gets into a relationship with Ogulcan and Aybike's paternal half-sister, Cansu.

=== Recurring ===
- Orhan Eren (Cüneyt Mete), (Seasons 1-4)

The quiet and kind-hearted husband of Ayten, Veli's brother, Oğulcan, Aybike and Umutcan's father, Gönül’s ex-husband, Şengül’s husband (until her death) and Kadir, Asiye, Ömer and Emel's paternal uncle. In Season 2, he divorced Şengül following a couple of incidents involving the Eren family; he meets his second wife, Gonul, in a bakery. The two eloped, later divorced, after Orhan found out that his ex-wife Şengül was pregnant with their third child, Umutcan. In Season 4, after Şengül's death, he learns that he has an illegitimate daughter named Cansu with his former lover, Ayten. He and Ayten end up getting married at the end of the season.

- Emel Eren (Aylin Akpınar), (Seasons 1-4)

The daughter of Hatice & Veli Eren, the youngest of the Eren siblings, Kadir and Asiye's biological younger sister, and Ömer's younger adoptive sister. Bahar’s best friend. She is a sweet girl who loves her siblings unconditionally but hides away the longing for her parents deep in her heart. She also loves to eat.

- Oğulcan Eren (Cihan Şimşek), (Seasons 1-4)

The clumsy yet good-natured son of Şengül and Orhan, elder brother of Aybike and Umutcan, paternal half-brother of Cansu, Biological cousın to Kadir, Asiye, and Emel and adoptive cousin to Ömer. Elif’s boyfriend and Harika’s and Afra’s ex-boyfriend. He was Doruk's rival in the first 3 episodes of the first season. Later he becomes close friends of Doruk and Berk after their relationship with Asiye and Aybike

- Nebahat Sen (Simge Selçuk), (Seasons 1-4)

Akif's ex-wife, Doruk and Melisa's mother. Bahar’s adoptive guardian. She caused the death of Resul Özkaya unintentionally.

- Ayla Kara (Asli Mavitan), ( Seasons 2-4)

Berk's and Elif's adoptive mother, Resul's ex-wife and caused the death of Serpil unintentionally

- Tolga Barçın (Berk Ali Çatal), (Seasons 1-4)

Recurring antagonist in the first two seasons, he later becomes a friend of the Eren family following a domestic abuse incident in Season 3. He is the son of Tarhan Barçın and elder brother of Leyla. Yaman's nephew and Lidya's cousin; he was Ayşe and Cemile’s ex-boyfriend and Zehra's husband (until her death), and becomes Yasmin's boyfriend in Season 4.

- Şevval Ender (Nihan Büyükağaç), (Seasons 3-4)

Recurring antagonist. Ahmet's ex-wife, Yasmin, and Sarp's mother and Ayaz's maternal aunt. She is the murderer of her ex-husband Ahmet Yılmaz and mother-in-law Sevgi Yılmaz. Following Ahmet’s death, she becomes Ataman College’s newest owner.

- Yasmin Yılmaz (Eylül Lize Kandemir), (Seasons 3-4)

Ahmet and Şevval's daughter, Sarp's sister, Ömer's paternal half-sister, Ayaz’s cousin and Sevgi’s granddaughter. Tolga’s girlfriend in Season 4. Murderer of Gökhan Cetin, Berk’s and Elif’s biological father. She was Asiye's rival during the third season

- Burak Çavdar (Emre Yetek), (Seasons 1-4)

Ataman school principal.

- Fatma Işık (Ayşe Kökçü), (Seasons 4)

Mother of Orhan and Veli, Grandmother of Kadir, Cansu, Oğulcan, Aybike, Asiye, Emel, and Umutcan. She replaces Şengül as the head of the house in the second half of Season 4.

- Elif Çetin (Dilara Sümbül), (Seasons 3-4)

Berk's twin sister, Gökhan’s and Serpil’s daughter and Ogulcan's girlfriend.

- Ayaz Sönmez (Berk Bakioğlu), (Seasons 4)

Şevval's nephew, Sarp and Yasmin's maternal cousin. He develops his feelings towards Asiye before her death.

- Bahar Güven/Atakul (Ayla Polat), (Seasons 3-4)

Zehra’s younger sister, Tolga’s adoptive sister-in-law, and Akif and Nebahat’s adoptive daughter. Emel’s best friend. She is a sweet girl who loves her family and stuffed animals.

- Ayten Eren (Selen Domaç), (Seasons 4)

Orhan's first lover who has a daughter with him called Cansu, Akif's long lost sister.

- Cansu Eren (Melisa Bostancıoğlu), (Seasons 4)

Ayten and Orhan's illegitimate daughter. Oğulcan, Aybike and Umutcan's older half-sister and Sarp’s girlfriend.

=== Departed ===
Actor	Role	Note	The reason the role ended
Çağla Şimşek	Ayşe	Tolga and Ömer's ex-girlfriend.	She moved to Bursa because of her mother's illness.
Cengiz Tangör	Veli Eren	Biological deceased father of Kadir, Asiye and Emel, adoptive deceased father to Ömer, Orhan's older brother, Hatice's husband.	Died after falling from a building.
Güzin Alkan	Hatice Eren	Biological deceased mother of Kadir, Asiye and Emel, deceased adoptive mother of Ömer, Veli's wife.	Died in a traffic accident.
Halit Özgür Sarı	Kadir Eren	Main protagonist of the first 2 seasons. Son of Hatice and Veli Eren, eldest of the four siblings, his siblings are his two biological younger sisters (Asiye & Emel) and his younger adopted brother (Ömer). Süsen's ex-boyfriend, Melisa's boyfriend. He was an honest, hardworking and distant young man. Assumed the role of both mother and father to look after his younger siblings after their parent's death.	Died in a car accident caused by Melisa unknowingly.
Damlasu İkizoğlu	Melisa Atakul	Daughter of Akif and Nebahat Atakul, Doruk's younger sister, Kaan's paternal half-sister, Ömer’s former love interest and Kadir's girlfriend. She causes Kadir's death unknowingly by a car accident while Kadir was driving in the opposite direction of the lane. From Harika’s group of friends, Melisa was easily the nicest, smartest and most approachable of the four girls. She never discriminated the Eren siblings in the first season due to their poor living conditions. Instead, Melisa invited them to her birthday party much to the dismay of her brother, Doruk, and friends. As the seasons went on, Melisa started dating Kadir, the elder sibling, and her friends began to slowly accept the Eren siblings as who they truly were.	Was sent to a psychiatric hospital in Switzerland after she lost her mind after Kadir's accident.
Kaan Sevi	Mazlum	Kadir's best friend, Talya's boyfriend.	Departed after the death of Kadir and traveled with Talya
İrem Salman	Talya Özder	Melisa, Harika and Süsen's friend, Mazlum's girlfriend.	She traveled to another country with Mazlum.
Nilsu Yilmaz	Cemile Akgün	Friend of the Eren Family after meeting Asiye and Emel at an orphanage. She's also Tolga's ex-girlfriend	Traveled to another country.
Ogün Kaptanoğlu	Resul Özkaya	Ayla's ex-husband, Berk's adoptive father. He was a wealthy businessman and was constantly absent during Berk's upbringing.	Died after bumping his head on a table
Eren Ören	Kaan Korkut/Atakul	Akif's illegitimate son, Melisa and Doruk's paternal half-brother	Died after falling on a school railing.
Gözde Türker	Harika Manyaslı	Kenan and Suzan's daughter, Ömer's maternal half-sister. Doruk’s, Emir’s, and Olğucan’s ex-girlfriend. Süsen’s, Talya’s, and Melisa’s best friend. She was Asiye's and Aybike's rival. In the middle of the second season she dates Oğulcan and becomes friends with Eren family. First introduced as Ataman College’s queen bee, Harika is a person who likes to maintain her status as a popular girl and life full of riches. She hated the Eren family, until it was revealed that Ömer was her half-brother much to her disapproval at first, and that her former wealthy status came to an untimely end following her father’s death and Suzan’s breach of contract from Akif. Despite living a normal life, Harika continues to spend money on luxury things for herself, but she learned to befriend the Eren family mostly through Olğucan and help her mother and friends in difficult times.	Left Istanbul to start a new life with Sevgi's money.
Murat Onuk	Kenan Manyaslı	Suzan's deceased husband, Harika's father and Akif's old business partner.	Died in a traffic accident.
Yıldız Kültür	Sevgi Yılmaz	Ahmet's mother, Sarp, Yasmin and Ömer's paternal grandmother. She was a wealthy businesswoman who found out about her lost grandson’s (Ömer’s) tragic life that she decided to help the Eren family. In a flashback, when Suzan was pregnant with Ömer, Ms. Sevgi initially rejects her because of her affair with her son, Ahmet.	Died because of Şevval, by not wanting to let her get out of the basement.
Zeki Eker	Tarhan Barçın	Major antagonist. Tolga and Leyla’s abusive father. A greedy and corrupt businessman. Yahya Hassen	Initially arrested and then released for threatening and trying to kill Tolga and Oğulcan at gunpoint, Akif had Tarhan behind bars after exposing his dirty work in his business.
Nazlı Çetin	Leyla Barçın	Tolga’s younger sister. She's had a rivalry with Süsen due to her having a crush on Ömer, Süsen's boyfriend.	Died after Süsen accidentally pushed her down the stairs, she hit her head while falling down.
Evrim Doğan	Gönül	Orhan's former wife and Șengül's rival.	Moved to Germany with her daughter Afra
Ecem Sena Bayır	Afra Yıldız	Gönül's daughter and Ogulcan's ex-girlfriend. She was Aybike and Ogulcan's rival at the beginning of the third season. Later she goes into a relationship with Oğulcan.	Moved to Germany alongside her mother Gönül
İlayda Sezgin	Zehra Barçın	Bahar's older sister and Tolga's former wife	Died by gunshot.
Kaan Çakır	Ahmet Yılmaz	Sarp and Yasmin’s father, Ömer's biological father, ex-husband of Şevval and Suzan’s fiancé and childhood ex-boyfriend.	Died in a traffic accident because of Şevval
Onur Seyit Yaran	Doruk Atakul	The handsome son of Akif and Nebahat Atakul, elder brother of Melisa, paternal half-brother of Kaan, Berk's best friend, Asiye's boyfriend and Harika's ex-boyfriend. He was Ömer and Oğulcan's rival at the beginning of the first season, after falling in love with Asiye he starts understanding, respecting and being kind towards Eren family.	Died in a traffic accident after hearing about the accident of Kadir.
Mark Raymund	Mahir Doğan	A mechanic who saved Akif from shooting himself.	Moved to Ankara to be with his brother.
Fadik Sevin Atasoy	Şengül Eren	The compulsive, prideful, and greedy paternal aunt of Kadir, Asiye, Emel, and Ömer. Orhan's wife, Oğulcan, Aybike and Umutcan's mother. She has done unforgivable actions which she regrets later.	Died in a bus accident off-screen.
Ahu Yağtu	Suzan Soydan	Kenan's widow, Harika's mother, Ömer's biological mother, Ahmet's ex-girlfriend and fiancée (until his death), Akif's ex-wife and Yaman's wife. Also got pregnant by Yaman.	Died after being accidentally run over by Süreyya and Akif.
Su Burcu Yazgı Coşkun	Asiye Eren	Co-Protagonist alongside Omer in Seasons 2-4. Daughter of Veli and Hatice Eren, sister of Kadir, Emel, and adoptive twin-sister of Ömer. Doruk's girlfriend. Asiye was a smart and talented student and singer. She aspired to become a lawyer and a professional singer next to Doruk.	Died by gunshot.
Şeyma Korkmaz	Süreyya Kıllıç	Süsen's mother. Stayed many years in Canada with her ex-husband, caused Suzan's death unintentionally.	Died by gunshot while protecting Ömer.
Elcin Irem Zehra	Lidya Soydan	Yaman’s daughter, Tolga’s maternal cousin, Sarp's ex-girlfriend and Süsen’s rival.	Moved to Canada
Enes Demirkapi	Emir Eçe	Minor antagonist. Dora's and Harika's abusive ex-boyfriend; Rival to Ömer, Oğulcan, Doruk, and Berk; Tolga's former sidekick.	Transferred to a different school unknowingly.
Ilgaz Kaya	Dora Ünal	Emir's ex-girlfriend, she had love interest in Omer.	Transferred to a different school following Kaan's accidental death from a fall orchestrated by Süsen.
Baris Aksavas	Ismail	Sevgi's assistant and friend	
Murat Divitcioglu	Gökhan Çetin	Recurring antagonist. Berk and Elif's biological father. A criminal, he was known to have a gambling addiction and used his son, Berk, for monetary gains. He developed a rivalry with Berk's adoptive mother, Ayla.	Died from a blow to the head
Rızacan Durmuş	Umut	This is one of the children seen in the background during Ömer and Asiye's visit to the orphanage.	

== Reception ==
Despite the show’s popularity in its native Turkey, it received mixed to favorable reviews from critics. The show received a 5.7/10 rating on IMDB. The setting, cinematography, acting (especially from Yiğit Koçak) received unanimous praise. However, the writing of the story (especially in Season 4) received mixed to negative reviews citing the unexpected deaths of its popular characters like Doruk and Asiye as a major issue.
