= Burcu Kıratlı =

Turkish actress (born 1989)

- Born: 23 July 1989 (age 37); Istanbul, Turkey
- Education: Anatolian High School; Yeditepe University
- Occupations: Actress, model
- Years active: 2010–present
- Known for: Aşk ve Mavi; Diriliş: Ertuğrul; Peri Masalı
- Spouses: Sinan Akçıl (m. 2018; div. 2019) (m. 2021; div. 2022)

Burcu Kıratlı (born 23 July 1989) is a Turkish film and television actress and model. She is best known for her roles in Aşk ve Mavi, Diriliş: Ertuğrul and Peri Masalı. She has been the face of a variety of advertising campaigns. Since her debut, she has also appeared in numerous magazine covers, articles, and editorials across Turkey. Kıratlı received an award at the Carriers of Turkish Cinema from the Past to the Future ceremony for her contributions to Turkish cinema on 8 October 2020.

== Early life and career ==
Kıratlı was born in Istanbul to Albanian parents. She completed her primary school education at Ata College, her secondary school education at BJK College, and her high school education at Bebek Yeni Yıldız College. She graduated from Yeditepe University, Faculty of Communication, Visual Communication Design with a bachelor's degree, and performed in many theatre plays and short movie projects while she was studying. She studied acting at the Müjdat Gezen Art Academy before working at the school as a permanent actress for 2 years. She started her acting career with the theatre plays Mustafa Kemal'im and Gözlerimi Kaparım, Vazifemi Yaparım.

She debuted on television with the character of Yağmur in the series titled Elde Var Hayat and received great acclaim with her acting performance. This series was broadcast on TRT 1 and lasted 2 seasons. In 2013, She made her first appearance in the film with the character of Helin in the movie Su ve Ateş, which was written and directed by Özcan Deniz.

In 2014, she played the character of Peri in the movie Peri Masalı. The film gained great critical success and her performance was noted as one of her bests. The work proved to be Kıratlı's first success, earning her the Best New Actress of the Year award at Digital Turkish Traditional Award Ceremony in 2015. The film is directed and produced by Biray Dalkıran. In 2018, Peri Masalı was selected as one of the Best Turkish Love Films of 2000. Returning to the TV screens after this film project, Kıratlı appeared on the TRT 1 in December 2014 with the character Gökçe in the series Diriliş: Ertuğrul. She was part of the series for 2 seasons. For this role she received the Best Actress Award by the jury of Ministry of Youth and Sports & Best Actress of the Year Award by public votes received from the poll opened by the Ministry. Diriliş: Ertuğrul is a Turkish historical fiction and adventure television series created by Mehmet Bozdağ. In 2015, and while her TV career continued, she played the lead character of Elif in the movie Bizim Hikaye, directed by Yasin Uslu.

Between 2016 and 2018, she starred in the drama series Aşk ve Mavi and played the lead character of Mavi. President Erdogan awarded Burcu Kıratlı with the award for 'the best actress of the year' for her performance at Radyo Televizyon Gazetecileri Derneği 2017 Yılı Medya Oscarları Ödül Töreni. She won the Drama Actress of the Year award at Datça Golden Almond Awards in 2017 for this role. The show received four awards at Golden Tourism Awards. Kıratlı also won the Golden Palm Award for TV Series Actress of the Year in 2018. The show also won the best director and best producer award at Golden Palm Awards and the Best Drama Series of the Year at Dizisi' Awards in 2017. The hit show had three seasons and was aired on ATV channel.

Kıratlı received The Most Stylish Actress of the Year 2019-2020 award from Istanbul University Fashion Society. She received an award at Türk Sinemasını Geçmişten Geleceğe Taşıyanlar ceremony for her contribution to Turkish cinema on 8 October 2020.

Kıratlı's most awaited film 7 Melek was released in 2024. The film, based on a real story, tells the life story of 7 female police officers in Ankara Gölbaşı Special Operations, which suffered the greatest damage in the coup attempt in July 2016.

In 2023-2024 Kıratlı appeared as Aslı Cansever opposite Furkan Andıç in the drama series Yıldızlar Bana Uzak aired on ATV channel.

Kıratlı will play the leading role in the upcoming romantic comedy film Aşk Sokakta written by written by Afak P. Hasani directed by Juli Yapım and produced by Hasan Doğan.

== Personal life ==
Burcu Kiratli was born on 23 July 1989 to Gül Erçetingöz and Tuncay Kıratlı. She married Turkish singer-songwriter Sinan Akçıl in the Turkish Consulate in Amsterdam, the Netherlands on 24 December 2018 with a simple marriage ceremony but the couple divorced in September 2019. They married for the second time on 22 February 2021. They divorced again in May 2022.

== Filmography ==
TV series
Year	Title	Role	Note
2010–2012	Elde Var Hayat	Yağmur	Supporting role
2014–2016	Diriliş: Ertuğrul	Gökçe Hatun	Parallel Lead
2016–2018	Aşk ve Mavi	Mavi Göreçki	Leading role
2023–2024	Yıldızlar Bana Uzak	Aslı Cansever	Leading role

Film
Year	Title	Role	Note
2013	Su ve Ateş	Hellen	Supporting role
2014	Peri Masalı	Peri	Leading role
2015	Bizim Hikaye	Elif	Leading role
2024	7 Melek	Cennet	Leading role
2025	Aşk Sokakta		Leading role

== Awards and nominations ==
Awards
Year	Awards	Category	Work	Result
2015	Digital Media Awards	Best New Actress Award	Peri Masalı	Won
2016	Ankara Ministry of Youth Awards	Best Actress Award / Jury Best Actress of the Year / Public votes	Diriliş: Ertuğrul	Won Won
2017	Media Oscars Award Ceremony of the Association of Radio and Television Journalists	Best Female Drama Actress of the Year	Aşk ve Mavi	Won
2017	Golden Tourism Awards	Best Female Drama Actress of the Year	Aşk ve Mavi	Won
2017	Datça Golden Almond Awards	Female Drama Actress of the Year	Aşk ve Mavi	Won
2018	Golden Palm Awards	Female Series Player of the Year	Aşk ve Mavi	Won
2018	Watson's Beauty and Personal Care Awards	The Most Beautiful Hair Award		Won
2019	Istanbul University Fashion Society Awards	The Most Stylish Actress of the Year		Won
2020	Carriers of Turkish Cinema from the Past to the Future Awards	Contribution in Turk Cinema	Peri Masalı, Bizim Hikaye, Su ve Ateş	Won
