= Fadik Sevin Atasoy =

Turkish actress and writer (born 1975)

- Born: 1 October 1975 (age 49); Ankara, Turkey
- Education: Bilkent University
- Occupation(s): Actress, scriptwriter, director, writer
- Years active: 2000–present
- Parent(s): Sönmez Atasoy; Emel Göksu
- Awards: list

Fadik Sevin Atasoy (born 1 October 1975) is a Turkish actress, scriptwriter, film director, and writer.

== Early life and education ==
Atasoy was born on 1 October 1975 in Ankara. Her father Sönmez Atasoy was an actor from Erzincan, while her mother Emel Göksu was of Georgian descent. From her mother's second marriage, she has a younger half-brother, ballerino Eren Keleş. Fadik was named after the play Fadik Kız, which her father staged when she was born.

She graduated from Bilkent University School of Music and Performing Arts in 1998. She also completed her master's degree at the same university with a scholarship. Then she joined the State Theatres and worked there for 6 years. She worked as a manager before becoming a permanent actress at the Antalya State Theatre in 2000.

== Career ==
=== Early years ===
When she was four years old, she took part in the play Teneke staged at the İzmir State Theatre, in which her parents also had roles. With this role, she received the Best Actor Award at the Selçuk Theatre Festival organized by the same theatre. She appeared on the radio with a children's program called Çocuklarla Başbaşa. Her first appearance on the screen took place with her role as Meral in the children's program Ahmet'in Günlüğü, which started to be broadcast in 1982.

Atasoy acted in an award-winning commercial by Reha Erdem before acting in TV series.

=== Television ===
Bizim Evin Halleri marked her first appearance in a TV series, in which she played the role of Rüya. In the following years, she continued her television career by notable role in Ah Kalbim.

With Cüneyt Mete, Evrim Doğan, and Güzin Alkan, she appeared in Dudaktan Kalbe, based on the classic novel and youth series Kardeşlerim. For her role as Şengül in Kardeşlerim, she won the Best Actress of the Year award at the 2021 Moon Life Awards, and the Best Actress Award at The Best of Time 2022 Awards.

=== Film ===
Atasoy's first role in a television movie was her portrayal of the character Nazlı in Kısmet, which was produced in 2004. In 2005, she appeared in the movies Döngel Karhanesi and O Şimdi Mahkum playing the roles of Müstesna and Katerina, respectively. In the same year she won the Best Supporting Actress award at the 42nd Antalya Golden Orange Film Festival for her role in O Şimdi Mahkum. She also received a nomination in the Best Supporting Actress category at the 11th Sadri Alışık Awards.

In 2007, she appeared in the movies Beyaz Melek, Geçerken Uğradım and Zeynep'in Sekiz Günü. In 2008, she shared the leading role with Yetkin Dikinciler, Şevket Çoruh and Hasibe Eren in the movie Usta. In 2008, she won the Best Actress award at the 19th Ankara International Film Festival. The love scene in the movie Usta received much press attention. While appearing on the program Cinemania, Atasoy stated that she found the coverage and reactions to be exaggerated. She subsequently played the role of Zişan in the movie Ay Lav Yu, which was produced in 2009 and screened in 2010. In 2011, she appeared together with her father in the 20-minute short film Merhaba. The film tells the story of a woman who returns from America to Istanbul to see her father, who has an incurable muscle disease (ALS). The film was directed and produced by American director and producer Lauren Rachen Brady. The leading roles were played by Atasoy, her father Sönmez Atasoy, Nursel Köse, Paxton Winters and İskender Altın. For her role in this movie, she received the Best Actress award at the Tisch-First Run Film Festival organized by New York University. In the same year she appeared in the movie Mavi Pansiyon. Atasoy has appeared in a number of American productions. In 2016, she had a role in the movie The 6th Degree followed by Peril of a Godsend, which was shot in 2018 and released in 2019.

=== Theatre ===
She had a role in an adaptation of Molière's play The Miser with Haluk Bilginer at Oyun Atölyesi.

In 2008, under the direction of her father Sönmez Atasoy, they founded the New York City Turkish American Art Society with a group of Turkish artists living in the USA. After the ensemble was founded, she first took a role in the play Kanlı Nigar alongside her father at the Broadway Town Hall. Later, she appeared in the play Keşanlı Ali Destanı, which was staged on 22 June 2010 at the same venue.

==== Move to the U.S. and MUSE 90401 ====
After the death of her father on 15 December 2011, Atasoy went to Santa Monica, California. According to her account, one day, while sitting by the oceanside, she met Merv Adelson, the founder of Lorimar Television. She attended the Oscar party with Adelson in 2013. After meeting him, she founded a production company called RedCase Entertainment, which made its name known with a fashion show by Özgür Masur. After the fashion show, Fadik Atasoy said, "The first guest of our journey with RedCase was Özgür Masur, who has been my friend for years and whose designs I carry with great admiration. It is also a source of pride for us that a Turkish designer took part in Los Angeles Fashion Week for the first time."

On 8 March 2015, the play MUSE 90401, the original of which was written by Atasoy in English, premiered in Los Angeles. After this success, she prepared to stage the play in Turkey together with Erdal Beşikçioğlu. Atasoy translated the entire play and the songs within it into Turkish. On 27 March 2019, the play made its Turkish premiere at the Tatbikat Sahnesi in Ankara, and this time it was directed by Beşikçioğlu. The third premiere of the play was held in Edinburgh and then it went on stage in Istanbul for the first time at the invitation of Zorlu PSM. The play is a one-man show musical, played only by Atasoy. The production company was RedCase Entertainment. Atasoy played 5 different characters in the play and there are 5 songs with lyrics written by Atasoy. The play won the "Best Drama Production" award at the US Boulder International Fringe Festival. Atasoy was nominated in the Best Actress category at the Newcomer Awards organized by The Warren Theater in 2020. Atasoy continued to stage this play in theatres both in Turkey and in various countries. After watching the performance live, HFPA President Aida Takla O'Reilly described it as "a genius play".

=== TV presentation ===
Atasoy hosted the opening ceremony of the Rome Turkish Film Festival in Italian in 2011.

In 2021, she presented GQ Türkiye's Men of the Year ceremony.

=== As judge ===
In 2011, she served as a judge at the 22nd Ankara International Film Festival with Erdal Beşikçioğlu, Murat Özer, Serdar Akar and Ayla Kanbur. In 2017, she was a member of the judging panel with Rebecca Lenkiewicz, Kjartan Sveinsson and Karim Ainouz at the 54th Antalya International Film Festival. She was the only Turkish person on the panel. She was also among the judges at the Golden Baklava Film Academy and the International Student Film Festival, the 6th of which was held in 2021.

=== Other activities ===
Atasoy has authored a book titled Fadik ve Kırmızı Bavul, which was published in 2014.

She both wrote the script and directed her own film project, Jülyet'in Yolculuğu, a joint production of Red Case and SkyFilms.

Atasoy was appointed by the Ministry of Culture and Tourism at the Los Angeles Cultural Promotion Attaché for 6 months with the aim of promoting Turkish cinema in the USA, directing the producers operating in Hollywood to Turkey, and representing Turkey effectively in major film festivals. Later, she was appointed as Turkey's cinema ambassador in the United States at Turkey's Culture and Tourism Consultancy in Los Angeles. In the interview she made after her appointment, she said that she contributed to the establishment of "a government-affiliated Turkish theatre in Bulgaria".

In 2019, she came together with various women for the charity project Esin Perim Benim. The event was held at the Büyülü Orman Personal Development Center in Ankara.

== Filmography ==
Television Series
Year	Title	Role	Notes
2000	Bizim Evin Halleri	Rüya Ulusoy	
2003	Serseri Aşıklar	Yeliz	
2004	Ah Be İstanbul	Yeter	
2006	Sev Kardeşim	Fatoş Uzunoğlu	
2007	Ayrılık	Aslı	
2007–2008	Dudaktan Kalbe	Leyla Paşazade	
2008	Son Bahar	Lale	
2009	Avrupa Yakası	Mahide	
2009	Aynadaki Düşman	Zerrin Batıkaya	
2009	Ah Kalbim	Sevilay	
2021–2024	Kardeşlerim	Şengül Eren	
Film
Year	Title	Role	Notes
2004	Kısmet	Nazlı	Television film
2005	Döngel Kârhanesi	Müstesna	
2005	O Şimdi Mahkum	Katerina	
2007	Beyaz Melek	Hatice	
2007	Geçerken Uğradım	Mehpare	
2007	Zeynep'in Sekiz Günü	Zeynep	
2008	Usta	Emine	
2009	Ay Lav Yu	Zişan	
2011	Mavi Pansiyon	Bahar	
2011	Merhaba	Özge	Short film
2016	The 6th Degree	Drea	American productions
2019	Peril of a Godsend		American productions
2020	Hatıra Fotoğrafı	Şefika	Short film
TV programs
Year	Title	Network	References
2007	Beyaz Show	Kanal D	
2009	Cinemania	Kanal D	
2012	Disko Kralı	TV8	
2019	Hülya Koçyiğit ile Film Gibi Hayatlar	TRT 2	
2019	Uykusuzlar Kulübü	TV100	
2019	O Anın Hikayesi	NTV	
2019	Aslı Şafak'la İşin Aslı	Bloomberg HT	
2019	Mesut Yar ile Laf Çok	360	

== Theatre ==
Theatre
Year	Title	Role	Notes
2004	Cimri	Elise	
2008	Kanlı Nigar		went on stage in the U.S.
2010	Keşanlı Ali Destanı		went on stage in the U.S.
2015–present	MUSE 90401 (Bir Esin Perisi Davası)		As actress, writer and translator

== Awards and nominations ==
Year	Award	Category	Work	Result
2005	42nd Antalya Golden Orange Film Festival	Best Supporting Actress	O Şimdi Mahkum	Won
2006	11th Sadri Alışık Awards	Best Supporting Actress	O Şimdi Mahkum	Nominated
2007	1st Yeşilçam Awards	Best Actress	Zeynep'in Sekiz Günü	Nominated
2007	40th Turkish Film Critics Association Awards	Best Actress	Zeynep'in Sekiz Günü	Nominated
2008	19th Ankara International Film Festival	Best Actress	Zeynep'in Sekiz Günü	Won
2011	New York University Tisch-First Run Film Festival	Best Actress	Merhaba	Won
2012	World Consumer Academy	Top Quality Actor of the Year	-	Won
2020	The Warren Theatre Newcomer Awards	Best Actress	MUSE 90401	Nominated
2021	Moon Life Awards	Best Actress of the Year	Kardeşlerim	Won
2022	The Best of Time 2022 Awards	Best Actress	Kardeşlerim	Won
