= Onur Seyit Yaran =

Turkish actor

- Born: 13 January 1995 (age 31); Istanbul, Turkey
- Education: Haliç University (Sports Management)
- Occupations: Actor, model
- Years active: c. 2016–present
- Height: 1.88 m (6 ft 2 in)
- Awards: Best Model of Turkey 2016

Onur Seyit Yaran (born 13 January 1995) is a Turkish TV series actor and former model.

== Life and career ==
Onur Seyit Yaran was born on 13 January 1995 in Istanbul. He was the winner of Best Model of Turkey in 2016. He represented Turkey in the Best Model of Turkey competition after he won the best Model of Turkey competition.

He started acting with the family comedy series Kalk Gidelim. Series has 4 seasons. He played as Canberk Dal in 1–2 seasons. He has guest role in youth series Hayat Bazen Tatlıdır. He joined in second season of series Vuslat.

Between 2021 and 2023, he played the leading role in the youth series Kardeşlerim. On 16 December 2021, he won the Rising TV Star of the Year Award at the GQ Men of the Year Awards ceremony. He won an award in the category of "Best TV Series Couple" with Su Burcu Yazgı Coşkun at the Golden Butterfly Awards ceremony on 4 December 2022.

== Filmography ==
Television
| Year | Title | Role | Channel | Note |
|---|---|---|---|---|
| 2017–2019 | Kalk Gidelim | Canberk Dal | TRT 1 | Supporting role |
| 2017 | Hayat Bazen Tatlıdır | Student | Star TV | Guest |
| 2019–2020 | Vuslat | Enes | TRT 1 | Second season |
| 2021–2023 | Kardeşlerim | Doruk Atakul | Atv | Main role |
| 2024 | Yan Oda | Taylan Alabey | Star TV | Main role |
| Soon | Yörük Kızı | Kaan | TRT 1 | Main role |

== Awards and nominations ==
| Year | Association | Category | Nominated work | Result | Ref. |
|---|---|---|---|---|---|
| 2016 | Best Model of Turkey | – | – | First place | |
| 2018 | White Lily Awards | Breakthrough Actor of the Year | Kalk Gidelim (Get up, let's go) | Won | |
| 2018 | 4. TRNC Cyparazzi Awards | Breakthrough Actor of the Year | | | |
| 2021 | We Asked the Students Project Awards | Best Supporting Actor | Kardeşlerim | | |
| 2021 | We Asked the Students Project Awards | Best TV Series Couple (With Su Burcu Yazgı Coşkun) | Kardeşlerim | Won | |
| 2021 | Gündemi TV Awards | Best Breakthrough Actor | Kardeşlerim | Won | |
| 2021 | Gündemi TV Awards | Best TV Series Couple (With Su Burcu Yazgı Coşkun) | Kardeşlerim | Won | |
| 2021 | 47th Golden Butterfly Awards | Best TV Series Couple (With Su Burcu Yazgı Coşkun) | Kardeşlerim | Nominated | |
| 2021 | Istanbul University 7th Golden 61 Awards | Best Supporting Actor of the Year | Kardeşlerim | Won | |
| 2021 | GQ Men of the Year Awards | Rising Star of the Year | Kardeşlerim | Won | |
| 2021 | Ayaklı Newspaper Awards | Rising Young Star of the Year | Kardeşlerim | Won | |
| 2022 | Güzel Awards | The best actor | Kardeşlerim | Won | |
| 2022 | Güzel Awards | Best TV Series Couple (With Su Burcu Yazgı Coşkun) | Kardeşlerim | Won | |
| 2022 | 6. Okan University Best of the Year Awards | Best TV Series Couple (With Su Burcu Yazgı Coşkun) | Kardeşlerim | Won | |
| 2022 | 6th Haliç University Best of the Year Awards | Rising Actor of the Year | Kardeşlerim | Won | |
| 2022 | 6th Haliç University Best of the Year Awards | Best TV Series Couple of the Year (With Su Burcu Yazgı Coşkun) | Kardeşlerim | Won | |
| 2022 | 48th Golden Butterfly Awards | The best actor | Kardeşlerim | Nominated | |
| 2022 | 48th Golden Butterfly Awards | Best TV Series Couple (With Su Burcu Yazgı Coşkun) | Kardeşlerim | Won | |
| 2022 | Girls Ask Best of the Year Awards | Best TV Series Couple of the Year (With Su Burcu Yazgı Coşkun) | Kardeşlerim | Won | |
