= Murat Han =

Turkish-American stage and film actor (born 1975)

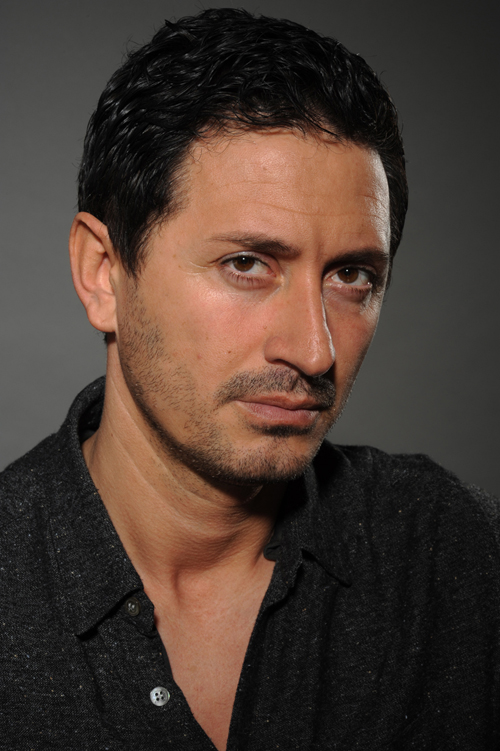
- Born: 1 May 1975 (age 51); Ankara, Turkey
- Education: Bilkent University Faculty of Music and Performing Arts Theatre Stella Adler acting academy
- Occupations: Actor, producer
- Years active: 2007–present
- Parent(s): Temam Han, Feyzullah Han
- Awards: Golden Orange Award for Best Actor (2007)

Murat Han (born 1 May 1975) is a Turkish-American stage and film actor. He is best known for Bliss, Vicdan, Ömre bedel, Sensiz Olmaz and Thophy.

== Biography ==
Murat Han is an Ankara-born film and television actor. He attended Bilkent University. He earned a BA in theater arts in Turkey and relocated to Los Angeles in 1998 to continue acting studies at the Stella Adler Academy for the next two years. Han also joined many acting workshops, benefiting from work with Charles Waxberg on script analysis for performers. He has been acting in leading roles in Turkish TV series and movies distributed widely in the Middle East and East Europe. He currently lives in Los Angeles and is working on new projects.

== Film and television ==
- Vazgeç Gönlüm (2007–2008) as Salih
- Bliss (2007) as Cemal; 44th Antalya Golden Orange Film Festival - best actor
- Vicdan (2008) as Mahmut
- Ömre Bedel (2009) as Cesur
- Hesaplaşma (2009)
- Sensiz Olmaz (2011) as Hakan
- Thophy (2011) as Ivan
- Eve Düşen Yıldırım (2012) as Namik
- Sana Bir Sır Vereceğim (2013–2014) as Mehmet
- Hatasız Kul Olmaz (2014) as Bulut
- Kervan 1915 (2016) as Salim
- Evlat Kokusu (2017) as Cevahir Akbaş
- Savaşçı (2018–2019) as Karon
- Akif (2020) as Ali Şükrü Bey
- Yalnız Kurt (2022) as Doğan Sakınmaz
- Prestij Meselesi (2023) as Eşref
- Kudüs Fatihi Selahaddin Eyyubi (2023 - 2024) as Gabriel
