= Simge Küçükyavuz =

Turkish-American industrial engineer

Simge Küçükyavuz is a Turkish-American industrial engineer whose research involves mathematical optimization, including mixed-integer programming and stochastic programming, and their applications in network design. She is David A. and Karen Richards Sachs Professor of Industrial Engineering and Management Sciences, and Chair of Industrial Engineering and Management Sciences, at Northwestern University.

== Education and career ==
Küçükyavuz graduated from Middle East Technical University in Ankara in 1998, with a bachelor's degree in industrial engineering. She went to the University of California, Berkeley for graduate study in industrial engineering and operations research, earning a master's degree in 2000 and completing her Ph.D. in 2004. Her doctoral dissertation, Polyhedral Approaches to Capacitated Fixed-Charge Network Flow Problems, was supervised by Alper Atamturk.

She joined the University of Arizona Department of Systems and Industrial Engineering in 2004 as a visiting assistant professor, becoming a regular-rank assistant professor in 2006. She moved to Ohio State University in 2009, and was promoted to associate professor there in 2012. She became dean's associate professor at the University of Washington from 2016 to 2018, when she moved to Northwestern University. At Northwestern, she was promoted to full professor in 2021 and named as the David A. and Karen Richards Sachs Professor in 2023, in the same year becoming department chair.

== Recognition ==
Küçükyavuz was a 2015 recipient of the Institute for Operations Research and the Management Sciences (INFORMS) Computing Society Prize. She was named as a Fellow of INFORMS, in the 2023 class of fellows, "for outstanding research in mixed-integer optimization and stochastic optimization, as well as distinguished service to, and leadership in, the profession".
