= Abdullah Oğuz =

Turkish film director and producer (born 1958)

Abdullah Oguz (born 17 June 1958 in Istanbul, Turkey) is a Turkish film director and producer. Oguz studied at Marmara University. From 1990 to 2000 he produced and directed commercials, TV series and music videos, and later, feature films.

== Films ==
=== Director ===
- Sıcak (2008)
- Mutluluk (2007)
- Kartallar Yüksek Uçar (2007)
- O Şimdi Mahkum (2005)
- Ah Be İstanbul (2004)
- Asmalı Konak - Hayat (2003)
- Estağfurullah Yokuşu (2003)
- Karaoğlan (2002)
- 90-60-90 (2001)
- Top Model (1994)
- Son Söz Sevginin (1993)

=== Screenwriter ===
- Asmalı Konak - Hayat (2003)
- Mutluluk (2007)
