= Aşk ve Mavi =

Turkish tv series

- Written by: Gül Abus Semerci; Yelda Eroğlu
- Directed by: Hakan Arslan
- Starring: Emrah; Burcu Kıratlı
- Country of origin: Turkey
- Original language: Turkish
- No. of seasons: 3
- No. of episodes: 78

Production
- Production locations: Ürgüp, Nevşehir Province, Cappadocia, Turkey
- Cinematography: Burak Demirdelen
- Running time: 90 minutes

Original release
- Network: ATV
- Release: 4 November 2016 – 16 November 2018

Aşk ve Mavi (English: Love & Hate) is a Turkish television series starring Emrah as Ali and Burcu Kıratlı as Mavi in lead roles. The show earned critical acclaim and was a major commercial success including winning several awards. The soundtracks of the drama were equally successful and popular. The show gained massive popularity and is regarded as one of the famous Turkish modern era drama in terms of its dialogues, plot twists, superb acting, cinematography and music. The show was originally broadcast on ATV between 2016 and 2018.

== Plot ==
Ali (Emrah) is the son of a rich family and imprisoned in jail for killing a man named Ahmet. During his imprisonment, a girl named Mavi (Burcu Kıratlı) starts interacting with him through letters. Ali eventually falls in love with the girl, whom he never saw but knew only through letters. The day Ali was released, the two decided to get married right away, but it is no coincidence that Mavi chose Ali over so many people in prison to interact with. Mavi is the sister of Ahmet, who was allegedly killed by Ali years ago, and she seeks revenge against him. Although Ali is not the killer, he stayed in prison for 12 years to protect the real killer. Mavi tries to kill Ali on their wedding night, but luckily Ali was saved. His family came to know about Mavi's reality and sent her to jail. But Ali saves his wife, staying by her side, saying it was an accident. The family thinks Ali married and saved Mavi out of remorse. Otherside, Mavi is all set to get the job done this time and took Ali and his family with Vengeance.

== Cast ==
Actor	Role
Emrah	Ali Görecki
Burcu Kıratlı	Mavi Görecki
Işıl Yücesoy	Refika Görecki
Kenan Bal	Fazil Görecki
Cüneyt Mete	Çemal Görecki
Alayça Öztürk	Safiye Görecki
Ayşegül Ünsal	Hasibe Yilmaz
Seda Akman	Yüksel Karahan
Keremcem	Yaman
Ali Düşenkalkar	Müntaz
Osman Karakoç	İlyas
İpek Tuzcuoğlu	Elmas
Selin Dumlugöl	Pembe
Derya Artemel	Servet
Aydin Orak	Seyfi
Ferit Kaya	Faysal Koçak
Nur Yazar	Fatma
Gülderen Güler	Sevda
Uğur Uzunel	Ismet Görecki
Birgül Ulusoy	Birgül

== Awards ==
Year	Award	Winner	Presenter
2017	Male Series Player of the Year	Emrah	Moonlife Magazine Awards
2017	Male Series Player of the Year	Emrah	Enmoda Awards
2017	Female Drama Actress of The Year	Burcu Kıratlı	Datça Altın Badem Awards
2017	Drama Director of The Year	Hakan Arslan	Datça Altın Badem Awards
2017	Drama of The Year	Aşk ve Mavi	Datça Altın Badem Awards
2017	The Best Female Drama Actress of the Year	Burcu Kıratlı	Düzenlenen Altın Turizm Awards
2017	The Best Male Drama Actror of the Year	Emrah	Düzenlenen Altın Turizm Awards
2017	The Best Drama Director of the Year	Hakan Arslan	Düzenlenen Altın Turizm Awards
2017	The best series of the year	Aşk ve Mavi	Düzenlenen Altın Turizm Awards
2017	The Best Female Drama Actress of the Year	Burcu Kıratlı	Radyo Televizyon Gazetecileri Derneği 2017 Yılı Medya Oscarları Ödül Töreni
2017	The best TV series of the year	Aşk ve Mavi	Dizisi' ödülü Awards
2017	Best Drama Series	Ask Ve Mavi	Altın Palmiyede Award
2017	Best Producer Award	Yiğit Alp	Altın Palmiyede Award
2017	The Honor Award of the Year	Aşk ve Mavi	Altın Palmiyede Award
2017	The Song of the Century	Aşk ve Mavi	Altın Palmiyede Award
2018	Drama Series of the Year	Aşk ve Mavi	Altın Palmiyede Award
2018	Female Series Player of the Year	Burcu Kıratlı	Altın Palmiyede Award
2018	Best TV Series Music of the Year (Götür Beni Gittiğin Yere )	Emrah	MGD Awards
