= Simge Selçuk =

Turkish actress (born 1975)

- Born: 27 January 1975 (age 50); Ankara, Turkey
- Education: Bilkent University
- Occupation: Actress
- Years active: 1993–present

Simge Selçuk (born 28 January 1975) is a Turkish actress.

== Life and career ==
Selçuk was born 27 January 1975 in Ankara. She is a graduate of Bilkent University with a degree in music and performing arts. She made her television debut with a role in the TV series Ferhunde Hanımlar in 1993. She rose to prominence in 2004, with her role as Leyla in the series Aliye. She continued her career with roles in various television series, including Kalbimdeki Deniz, Avrupa Avrupa, and Acemi Cadı. In 2021, she was cast in a leading role in the drama series Kardeşlerim.

== Filmography ==
- 1993, 1999 – Ferhunde Hanımlar – (Yonca)
- 1995 – Çiçek Taksi
- 1996 – Gurbetçiler – (Özlem)
- 1999–2003 – Ayrılsak da Beraberiz – (Serpil)
- 2000–2001 – Tatlı Kaçıklar – (Serap)
- 2000 – Evdeki Hesap
- 2000 – Evdeki Yabancı – (Bengü)
- 2001 – Dünya Varmış – (Leyla)
- 2002 – Bir Tatlı Huzur
- 2004 – Aliye – (Leyla)
- 2004 – Metro Palas – (Özlem)
- 2004 – Çınaraltı – (Feyza)
- 2006 – Acemi Cadı – (Selda)
- 2007 – Ayda – (Nilüfer)
- 2007 – Elveda Derken – (Tuna)
- 2007 – Kader – (Sibel)
- 2008–2010 – Küçük Kadınlar – (Tezer Deviren)
- 2011–2012 – Avrupa Avrupa – (Mademoiselle Kathrine)
- 2011 – Mazi Kalbimde Yaradır – (Türkan)
- 2012 – Göç – (Handan)
- 2014 – Galip Derviş – (Meltem Ökse)
- 2014 – Güzel Köylü – (Nihal Sümbül / Aynımah Dinler)
- 2015 – Göç Zamanı – (Handan)
- 2016–2017 – Kalbimdeki Deniz – (Rachel)
- 2019 – Canevim – (Melis Korkmaz)
- 2020 – Zümrüdüanka – (Nezaket)
- 2021–present – Kardeşlerim – (Nebahat Atakul)
