= Emrah Kiraz =

Turkish footballer (born 1987)

Personal information
- Full name: Emrah Kiraz
- Date of birth: 30 October 1987 (age 39)
- Place of birth: Giresun, Turkey
- Height: 1.90 m (6 ft 3 in)
- Positions: Defender; defensive midfielder

Team information
- Current team: Gaziantep Ankasspor

Youth career
- Giresunspor

Senior career*
| Years | Team | Apps | (Gls) |
| 2005–2008 | Giresunspor | 14 | (2) |
| 2008–2012 | Bursaspor | 2 | (0) |
| 2009 | → Kocaelispor (loan) | 6 | (0) |
| 2009–2010 | → Göztepe (loan) | 11 | (0) |
| 2010 | → Ünyespor (loan) | 3 | (0) |
| 2011 | → Giresunspor (loan) | 0 | (0) |
| 2011–2012 | → Kahramanmaraşspor (loan) | 24 | (3) |
| 2012 | Kahramanmaraşspor | 3 | (0) |
| 2013 | Gaziosmanpaşaspor | 6 | (0) |
| 2013–2014 | Diyarbakırspor | 34 | (5) |
| 2014 | Trabzon Akçaabat | 5 | (0) |
| 2015 | Batman Petrolspor | 6 | (0) |
| 2015–2017 | Etimesgut Belediyespor | 54 | (5) |
| 2017–2018 | Diyarbakırspor | 27 | (4) |
| 2018–2019 | Tire 1922 Spor | 23 | (4) |
| 2019 | Diyarbakırspor | 13 | (0) |
| 2020 | Mardin BB | 8 | (1) |
| 2020– | Gaziantep Ankasspor | 0 | (0) |
- * Club domestic league appearances and goals as of 18 March 2020

Emrah Kiraz (born 30 October 1987) is a Turkish footballer who currently plays as a defender for Gaziantep Ankasspor.

Kiraz previously played for Giresunspor and Kocaelispor. He appeared in eight Süper Lig matches during 2008-09 season with Kocaelispor and Bursaspor. Also appeared in twelve TFF First League matches during 2007-08 season with Giresunspor.
