= Mustafa Avkıran =

Turkish actor

- Born: 3 March 1963 (age 63); Gaziantep, Turkey
- Education: Mimar Sinan University
- Occupation: Actor
- Years active: 1987–present

Mustafa Avkıran (born 3 March 1963) is a Turkish actor.

Avkıran graduated from Mimar Sinan University State Conservatory in 1983. He then joined the cast of Istanbul State Theatre. Eventually he received his master's degree from Mimar Sinan University. For a period he was the manager of Antalya State Theare. In 2000, together with Theatre Playhouse, he founded the İSM 2. Kat acting institution. Avkıran is best known for his roles in TV series such as hit series Kınalı Kar, Ezo Gelin based on true story, Yaprak Dökümü based on classic novel, hit police series Yılan Hikayesi, Kuzey Güney, period series Filinta and comedy series Yeni Gelin.

== Filmography ==
- Ateşten Günler (1987)
- Ayaşlı ve Kiracıları (1989)
- Yalnızlar (1991)
- Zontellektüel Abdullah (1994)
- Sokaktaki Adam (1995)
- İstanbul Kanatlarımın Altında (1996)
- Kayıkçı (1998)
- Kurtlar Sofrası (1999)
- Köstebek 2 (1999)
- Yılan Hikayesi (1999–2001)
- Kurşun Kalem (2000)
- Pencereden Kar Geliyor (2001)
- The Only Journey of His Life (2001)
- Kınalı Kar (2002)
- Beni Bekledinse (2004)
- Köpek (2005)
- Yaprak Dökümü (2008–2010)
- Av Mevsimi (2010)
- Kuzey Güney (2011–2013)
- Kaçak (2013–2014)
- Sevdam Alabora (2015)
- Delibal (2015)
- Filinta (2015–2016)
- Yeni Gelin (2017–2018)
- Azize (2019)
- Çukur (2020)
- İçimizden Biri (2021)
- Adım Farah (2023)
- Leyla: Hayat... Aşk... Adalet... (2024)

== Awards ==
- 1995: Golden Orange Film Festival - "Best Supporting Actor" (Sokaktaki Adam)
