= Emrah (singer) =

Turkish singer and actor (born 1971)

- Born: Emrah İpek; January 1, 1971 (age 55); Diyarbakır, Turkey
- Genres: Turkish pop, arabesque
- Occupations: Singer-songwriter, actor
- Years active: 1983–present
- Labels: Seyhan Müzik; Güneş Plak; Bayar Müzik; Bariş Müzik; Mert Müzik; Bonus Müzik; Doğan Müzik
- Website: www.emrah.com.tr

Emrah Erdoğan İpek (born January 1, 1971) is a Turkish-Kurdish singer, actor and child star during 1980's from Turkey..

== Life and career ==
He was born in Diyarbakır. He professionally entered the music world with his album Ağam Ağam during his time in middle school during 1984. With his performance in the leading role of the movie Zavallılar (1984), he became known as "Küçük Emrah" (Little Emrah). He is best known for films and popular series Kınalı Kar. The next year, he released his second album Gülom and Yaralı, which gained success. His subsequent follow-ups, Boynu Bükükler (1986) and Ayrılamam (1987) became best sellers. Emrah has sold more than 25 million records in Turkey.

Between 2014 and 2022, he was married to Sibel Kirer, with whom he has a son and a daughter. He also has a son from a previous relationship.

== Discography ==
=== Albums ===
- (1983) Ağam Ağam
- (1984) Gülom
- (1985) Yaralı
- (1986) Boynu Bükükler
- (1987) Ayrılamam
- (1988) Selam Sevdiklerime
- (1988) Neşeliyim
- (1989) Sevdim
- (1990) Hoşgeldin Gülüm]
- (1991) Sen Gülünce
- (1992) Bahar Konseri
- (1993) Haydi Şimdi
- (1994) Sevdim Mi Tam Severim
- (1995) Klasikleri
- (1996) Narin Yarim
- (1997) Nostalji
- (1998) Dura Dura
- (2000) Ya Hey
- (2002) Ar+ı
- (2003) Türküler ve Emrah
- (2004) Kusursuzsun
- (2005) Dön
- (2006) Adın Ne Senin
- (2007) Best of Emrah
- (2008) Yelpaze
- (2011) Terzinin Oğlu

=== Singles ===
- (2013) "Kasırga" (Gelmeyen Bahar movie soundtrack)
- (2015) "Ninni"
- (2016) "Götür Beni Gittiğin Yere"
- (2017) "Kırmızı Gül Demet Demet"
- (2017) "Eledim Eledim"
- (2018) "Dağlar Dağımdır Bwnim"
- (2019) "Gerçek Şu Ki" (feat. Ozan Doğulu)
- (2020) "Salgın"
- (2022) "Ayakta Kal Yüreğim"
- (2022) "Kızım"
- (2022) "Kahpe Felek" (feat. Caner Tepecik)
- (2025) "Derbeder"
- (2025) "Yaşamadan Ölme"

== Filmography ==
=== Movies ===
- 1984 – Zavallılar
- 1984 – Yaralı
- 1985 – Acıların Çocuğu
- 1986 – Ökzüzler
- 1986 – Acı Lokma
- 1986 – Merhamet
- 1986 – Ayrılamam
- 1987 – Sefiller
- 1987 – Vurmayın
- 1988 – Es Deli Rüzgâr
- 1988 – Acı
- 1988 – Seninle Ilk Defa
- 1989 – Sevdim
- 1990 – Can Evimden Vurdular
- 1990 – Yalnız Güneş Şahitti
- 1991 – Hoşgeldin Gülüm
- 1991 – Ibret
- 1991 – Ölesiye Sevmek
- 1993 – Yasak Sokaklar
- 1993 – Sensiz Olmaz
- 1994 – Yalnız Güneş Şahitti
- 2013 – Gelmeyen Bahar (writer-director-composer)

=== Television series ===
- 1992 – Gündüzün Karanlığı
- 1997 – Unutabilsem as Emrah
- 1999 – Belalım Benim
- 2002-2004 – Kınalı Kar as Ali
- 2004-2006 – Büyük Yalan as Emirhan
- 2006 – Adak as Cem
- 2007 – Oğlum için as Kemal
- 2009 – Hicran Yarası as Aziz
- 2016–2018 – Aşk ve Mavi as Ali
