= Ali's Eight Days =

- Theatrical Poster
- Directed by: Cemal Şan
- Written by: Cemal Şan
- Produced by: Cemal Şan
- Starring: Serdar Orçin; Begüm Birgören; Ufuk Bayraktar; Uğur Polat; Suleyman Atanisev
- Cinematography: Cengiz Uzun
- Edited by: Şenol Şentürk
- Music by: Nail Yurtsever
- Production company: Şan Film
- Distributed by: Medyavizyon
- Release date: May 8, 2009
- Running time: 107 minutes
- Country: Turkey
- Language: Turkish

Ali's Eight Days (Turkish: Ali'nin Sekiz Günü) is a 2009 Turkish drama film, written and directed by Cemal Şan, starring Serdar Orçin as a young shop owner who falls in love with a woman escaping from an abusive relationship. The film, which went on nationwide general release across Turkey on May 8, 2009, was shown at the 20th Ankara International Film Festival. It is the final part of a trilogy of films which includes Zeynep's Eight Days (2007) and Dilber's Eight Days (2008).

== Production ==
The film was shot on location in Istanbul, Turkey.
