= Dudaktan Kalbe =

- Based on: Dudaktan Kalbe (1925) by Reşat Nuri Güntekin
- Written by: Ece Yorenç; Melek Gençoğlu
- Directed by: Andaç Haznedaroğlu
- Starring: Burak Hakkı; Aslı Tandoğan; Özge Özder; Yiğit Özşener
- Opening theme: "Gecenin Hüznü"
- Composer: Toygar Işıklı
- Country of origin: Turkey
- Original language: Turkish
- No. of seasons: 2
- No. of episodes: 75

Production
- Running time: 90 minutes
- Production company: Ay Yapım

Original release
- Network: Show TV
- Release: 3 September 2007 – 26 May 2009

Dudaktan Kalbe ("From the Lips to the Heart") is a Turkish television series. It stars Burak Hakkı and Aslı Tandoğan. It is the fifth adaptation of Reşat Nuri Güntekin's famous novel, Dudaktan Kalbe. The 2007 adaptation takes place in the modern-day Turkey. The series doesn't include the main character "Doctor Vedat". While the characters Lamia and Cemil haven't met in the beginning of the novel, they already known each other in the series.

Reşat Nuri Güntekin was one of the most well-known authors of his day and a well-known figure in Turkish literature and theatre. The melancholy and romanticism of Leo Tolstoy's books are remembered by Dudaktan Kalbe. It was published in 1923 and focuses on the struggle between ethics, loyalty, love and ambition.

The television series ran for two seasons. In 2013, this series aired in Serbia as Plač Violine on Prva TV at 19:20.

== Story ==
The story concerns four main characters - Kenan (Burak Hakkı), Lamia (Aslı Tandoğan), Cemil (Yiğit Özşener) and Cavidan (Özge Özder) - and the complicated relationships that develop as they experience the triumphs and tragedies of life. The supporting characters provide a colorful and realistic background and the settings showcase the beauty of Turkish islands.

Hüseyin Kenan is a sensitive and talented musician who has struggled to overcome the emotional pain of a difficult and poverty-stricken childhood, and the grudging charity of his relatives. His childhood was deeply marked by the suicide of his father while in prison for robbery, and the unkindness of his uncle, Saib Bey, who raised him. Kenan feels unworthy of his first love, Leyla (Fadik Sevin Atasoy), and sacrifices their relationship to travel overseas and focus on his career, becoming a famous violinist but suppressing his true feelings to attain his ambition. Kenan decides not to fall in love anymore. Kenan's cousin, Cemil, marries Leyla even though he knows she doesn't love him. He hopes that one day she will forget Kenan and turn to him, but his wife's continued coldness causes him deep anguish and despair.

The main female character is Lamia, a young girl who is a devoted fan of Kenan and his music. After her parents' death she lives with relatives who provide food and shelter but treat her as a servant. Although doing her best to please them, they attempt to marry her to one of their relatives against her will. When Kenan and Lamia meet, there is an immediate physical and emotional attraction but Kenan suppresses his love because of Lamia's inferior social standing and the damage such a relationship might cause to his reputation. He does his best to help and protect Lamia without admitting his deep feelings and without making a real commitment to her. Kenan finally marries Cavidan, a powerful businesswoman and the daughter of a wealthy family, but sees Lamia's face instead of Cavidan's as she walks towards him in her wedding dress.

Cemil is a conflicted character whose jealousy of his famous cousin causes him to behave badly to his wife and to try to undermine Kenan's career. When Cemil faces disastrous consequences after coming to Lamia's rescue, she takes the blame for his actions and her life becomes very difficult. After his wife's death, Cemil begins to fall deeply in love with Lamia and his unselfish love changes him completely. It is a long and difficult task for Cemil to overcome Lamia's initial dislike and mistrust.

Kenan and Lamia share a strong bond through their little daughter, Melek (Sevgi Onat), and the complex and ever-changing relationships between Kenan, Lamia and Cemil provide drama and pathos. Kenan's inability to fully commit to the woman he loves brings a heavy penalty. Lamia's recognition of the difference between childish infatuation and true love, and Cemil's unselfish and patient devotion, bring the series to a surprising conclusion. At the end Kenan commits suicide whereas Lamia and Cemil get married.

== Special Promos ==
- First promo teaser of series is about Kenan and Lamia.
- Second season promo teaser is about adult Melek.
- In opening scene of 42nd episode, Lamia speaks with her diary in beach. This diary scene is details in special episode. The scenes of all first season summarized as her diary by Lamia's perspective. Lamia speaks only in beach.

== Other Adaptations ==
- 1951 - Cinema Film - Actors: Muzaffer Tema, Mesiha Yelda, Director and screenwriter: Şadan Kamil.
- 1964 - Cinema Film - Actors: Cüneyt Arkın, Hülya Koçyiğit, Director: Ülkü Erakalın, Screenwriter: Bülent Oran.
- 1989 - TV Series- Actors: Lale Başar Kalyoncu, Tarık Tarcan, Director: Okan Uysaler.
- 2004 - TV Film - Actors: Gökhan Arsoy, İpek Tuzcuoğlu, Director: Ülkü Erakalın.
