= Çağla Şimşek =

Turkish actress (born 2002)

- Born: 1 August 2002 (age 23); Çekmeköy, Istanbul, Turkey
- Occupation: Actress
- Years active: 2007–present

Çağla Şimşek (born 1 August 2002) is a Turkish actress.

== Life and career ==
Çağla Şimşek was born on 1 August 2002 in Istanbul. Her father is from Samsun while her mother is from Gümüşhane. Şimşek's talent was discovered by actor Osman Yağmurdereli, after which she made her television debut as a child actress with the TV series Elveda Derken, playing the role of Naz.

On her debut as an actress, she said:

On the way to the doctor with my mother, Osman Yağmurdereli saw us. He loved me very much. He gave my mother his card and told us to visit their set. My mother took me to the set. Then I started with the series Elveda Derken.

— from her interview with Bugün

She continued her career with her roles in the series Kırmızı Işık (2008), fantasy child series Kayıp Prenses (2008–2009) and Cuma'ya Kalsa(2010) with Haluk Bilginer. In 2011, she portrayed the character of Lavin in the series Hayat Devam Ediyor. Her breakthrough came with her role as Zehra in the series Küçük Gelin, after which she rose to prominence.

== Filmography ==
Film
Year	Title	Role	Notes
2010	Nisvan - Tarihe Adını Yazdıran Kadınlar	Fatma Aliye Hanım's childhood	Supporting role
2010	Vay Arkadaş		Supporting role
2014	Çeşme	Fatma	Leading role
2019	Ferhat ile Şirin: Ölümsüz Aşk	Şirin	Leading role
Television
Year	Title	Role	Notes
2007	Elveda Derken	Naz	Supporting role
2008	Kırmızı Işık	Merve	Supporting role
2008–2009	Kayıp Prenses	Duru	Leading role
2010	Cuma'ya Kalsa	Çağla	Supporting role
2011–2013	Hayat Devam Ediyor	Lavin Bakırcı	Supporting role
2013–2015	Küçük Gelin	Zehra Kara Kirman	Leading role
2017–2018	Elif	Reyhan	Leading role
2021	Kardeşlerim	Ayşe Kaya	Supporting role
2021–2022	Elkızı	Seher / Melek Bozdağlı	Leading role
2022	Tozluyaka	Hazal Küçük	Leading role
2024	Uzak Şehir	İpek Önderlioğlu	Supporting role
