= Bliss (2007 film) =

- Mutluluk
- Directed by: Abdullah Oğuz
- Written by: Kubilay Tunçer; Zülfü Livaneli
- Produced by: Abdullah Oğuz
- Starring: Özgü Namal; Talat Bulut; Murat Han; Lale Mansur
- Cinematography: Mirsad Herović
- Edited by: Levent Çelebi
- Music by: Zülfü Livaneli
- Distributed by: Kenda Film
- Release date: March 16, 2007
- Country: Turkey
- Language: Turkish

Bliss (Turkish: Mutluluk) is a 2007 Turkish film directed by Abdullah Oğuz, and starring Özgü Namal, Talat Bulut, and Murat Han. It was chosen to open the 2007 Asian Film Festival in Mumbai and the 2007 Medfilm Festival in Rome. It won the audience prize and the young jury prize at the 2008 Turkish Film Festival in Nuremberg and won the audience award for international films at the 2008 Miami International Film Festival. Also, Mutluluk was rewarded by European Council with the Prix Odyssee Human Rights Award in 2007.

== Plot ==
Meryem (Özgü Namal), a young woman of about 17 years old, is believed to have been violated, and her village's customs call for her to be killed to restore honor and dignity to her family and village. A young, newly returned war veteran and son of the village leader and factory owner, Cemal (Murat Han), is ordered to take Meryem to Istanbul and kill her, but at the last minute he doesn't allow himself to complete the task and the two, now unable to ever return to their village, run away together. Eventually, they meet up with ex-Professor Irfan, a man who has decided to live on a boat away from his wife and constricted life.

It is turned out that Meryem's uncle was the one that violated her. This caused Simel to be disgusted by the truth. He tried to kill his father but he was unable to. Meryem's father was shocked and enraged that his own brother violated his daughter and wanted his death to avenge the crime, killing his brother with a gun.

The film deals with morality as narrowly defined by tradition, in a series of situations in which the characters have to follow untraditional paths against their will. The harshness of existential pain is contrasted with beautiful landscapes by the Director of Photography, Mirsad Herovic.

This movie is adapted from the international best selling novel by Zülfü Livaneli.

== Cast ==
- Özgü Namal - Meryem
- Talat Bulut - İrfan
- Murat Han - Cemal
- Lale Mansur - İrfan's wife
- Mustafa Avkıran - Ali Riza
- Emin Gürsoy - Tahsin
- Meral Çetinkaya - Münevver

== Reception ==
On review aggregator website Rotten Tomatoes, the film holds an approval rating of 61% based on 23 reviews, and an average rating of 6.5/10. On Metacritic, the film has a weighted average score of 71 out of 100, based on 7 critics, indicating "generally favorable reviews".

Awards
Preceded by -	Yeşilçam Best Film Award; 2008	Succeeded by Three Monkeys
