= Zeynep's Eight Days =

2007 film by Cemal Şan

- Theatrical Poster
- Directed by: Cemal Şan
- Written by: Cemal Şan
- Produced by: Tekin Doğan
- Starring: Fadik Sevin Atasoy; Mustafa Üstündağ; Ahmet Mümtaz Taylan; Cengiz Sezici
- Cinematography: Sarp Kaya
- Edited by: Şenol Şentürk
- Music by: Baba Zula
- Production company: Avşar Film
- Distributed by: UIP
- Release date: November 30, 2007
- Running time: 123 minutes
- Country: Turkey
- Language: Turkish

Zeynep's Eight Days (Turkish: Zeynep'in Sekiz Günü) is a 2007 Turkish drama film, written and directed by Cemal Şan, starring Fadik Sevin Atasoy as an isolated woman searching for a stranger she fell in love with at a party. The film, which went on nationwide general release across Turkey on November 30, 2007, was shown in competition at the 44th Antalya Golden Orange Film Festival (October 19–28, 2007). It is the first part of a trilogy of films which includes Dilber's Eight Days (2008) and Ali's Eight Days (2009).
