= Glass Pyramid Sabancı Congress and Exhibition Center =

Convention center in Antalya, Turkey

Coordinates: 36.8845°N 30.6662°E

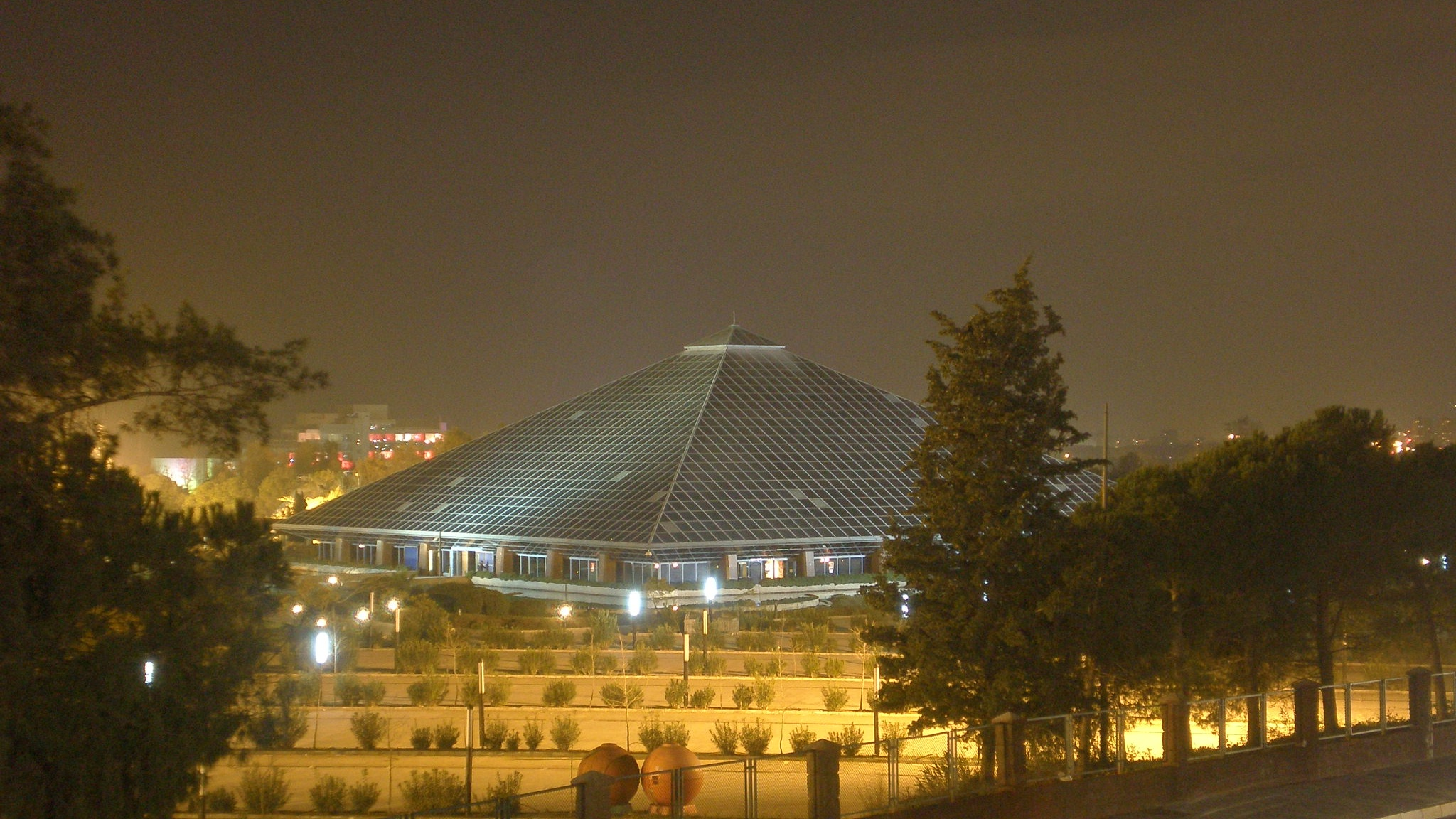
The Pyramid at night.

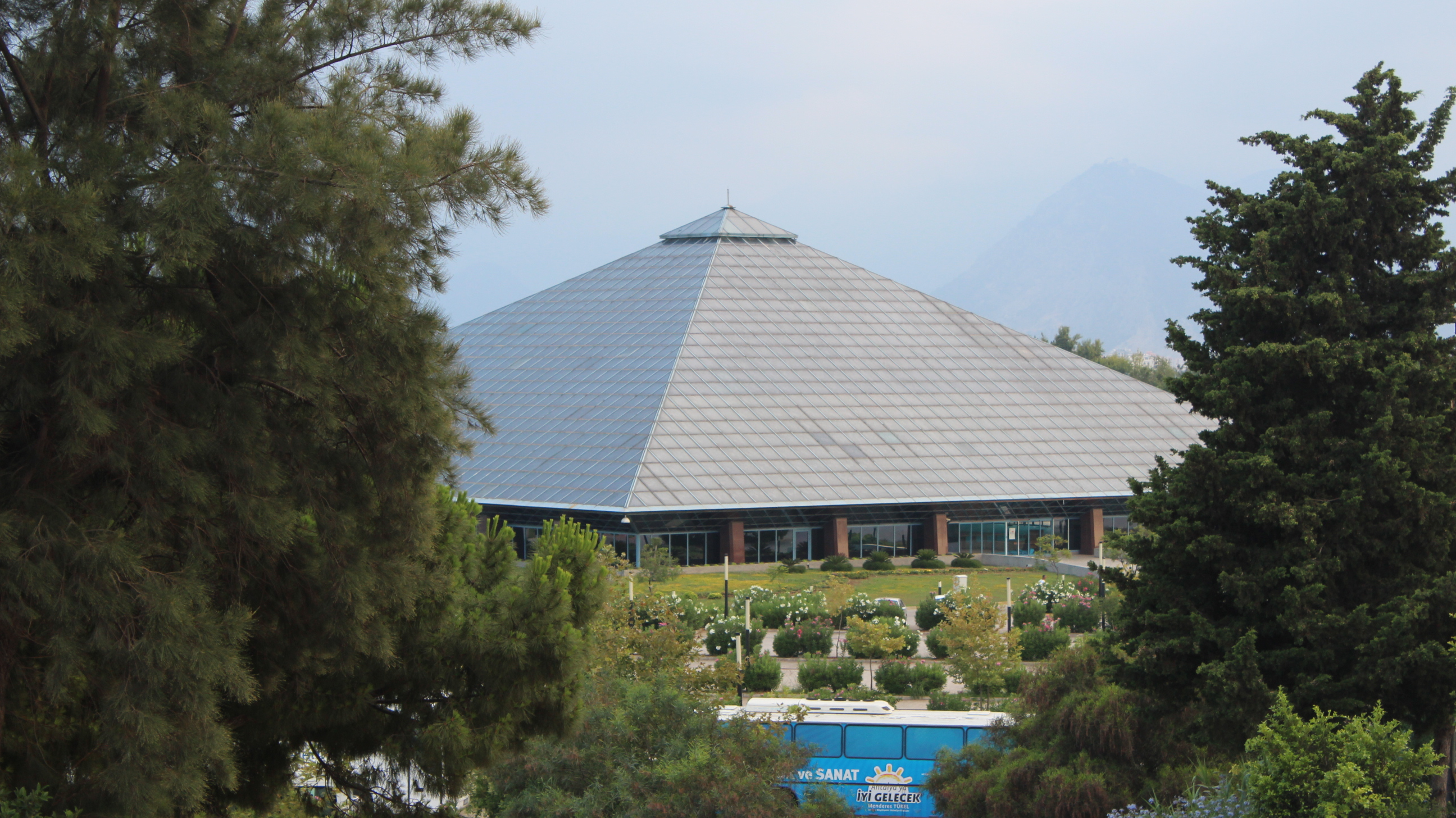
from same angle

The Glass Pyramid Sabancı Congress and Exhibition Center, mostly abbreviated as Glass Pyramid, (Turkish: Cam Piramit Sabancı Kongre ve Fuar Merkezi) is a multi-purpose convention complex located in Antalya, Turkey. The two floor building consists of five halls, the largest having a 2,400-seat capacity, an open-air 15,000 m^{2} exhibition area and various other facilities. The center was built by Sabanci Foundation, and its usage rights have been transferred to the Municipality of Antalya. It was commissioned on October 1, 1997 during the 34th Antalya Golden Orange Film Festival.

== Architecture ==
The architects Levent Aksüt and Yaşar Marulyalı designed the pyramid-shaped metal and glass building, surrounded by round-shaped decorative ponds. Situated inside the Hasan Subaşı Cultural Park, the complex with a total closed area of 9,000 m² on two floors, each floor with 4,500 m² area, has access from four sides.

The convention center has a space frame roof over the main hall on the ground floor, which is 23 m high and is covered with 5,710 m^{2} of colored titanium blue insulating glass.

== Facilities ==
With its air conditioning system and technical ware encompassing all units inside, the Glass Pyramid's halls are ideal for various national and international congresses, conferences, seminars, concerts and exhibitions.

=== Toros Hall ===
The largest of the halls is named after the close running Taurus Mountains. It has a 2,400-seat capacity with telescopic platforms when used for conferences, and an exhibition area of 3,036 m^{2}. The hall is equipped with multi-purpose audio, lighting, and visual systems and a mobile simultaneous interpretation cabin. On the plasma screens in the hall, various graphical views and animations can be shown.

=== Meltem Hall ===
Meltem Hall, named after the local breeze, is the second largest hall with a total area of 398 m^{2} and 440-seat capacity. It has a mobile simultaneous interpretation cabin available for conferences and meetings.

=== Düden Hall ===
Named after the nearby Düden Waterfalls, the third largest hall has a total area of 300 m^{2} and 340-seat capacity. The hall offers four fixed simultaneous interpretation cabins available for conferences and meetings.

=== Exhibition center ===
At the Exhibition Center, there are two halls, each with 87 m^{2} area and 50-seat capacity. These halls may be used as a meeting room, art gallery, press room, or as a cafeteria. Audio and visual transfer is possible between the halls during the activities.

On the open-air 15,000 m^{2} exhibition area, which is known as the King's Road, there are ten half-open exhibition centers, 265 m^{2} each. Additionally, the parking lot with 500-car capacity can also be converted to an open exhibition area.

== Notable events hosted ==
- Antalya Golden Orange Film Festival
