= Aslı Tandoğan =

Turkish actress

- Born: 2 April 1979 (age 47); Ankara, Turkey
- Occupation: Actress
- Years active: 2002–present
- Spouse: Cahit Tan Yeşilada (m. 2013)
- Children: 2

Aslı Tandoğan (born 2 April 1979) is a Turkish actress and professional harpist. Tandoğan graduated from the Music department of the State Conservatory of Hacettepe University. First, she chose the violin at conservatory for a year, and then chose the harp. Conservatory education started since childhood and continued for 10 years. She later joined Antalya Symphony Orchestra. Her father and aunt are ballet dancers. Her mother is a painter.

Tandoğan is best known for starring as the character Lamia in a series based on classic novel Dudaktan Kalbe ("From the Lips to the Heart").

She also co-starred in the movie Kabadayı as Karaca alongside Kenan İmirzalıoğlu, İsmail Hacıoğlu, Şener Şen. Also, she had guest role as Ilgın in hit crime series and film Behzat Ç. Her period roles are in Bir Zamanlar Osmanlı: Kıyam, Muhteşem Yüzyıl: Kösem, Kurşun Yarası. Her surreal roles are in Leyla ile Mecnun, İş Sanat Masal Tiyatrosu, Git Başımdan, Atlılar.

== Filmography ==
Web series
Title	Year	Role	Note
Behzat Ç. Bir Ankara Polisiyesi	2011	Ilgın	Guest
Leyla ile Mecnun	2013	Elanor	Guest
Melek ile Serhat	2015	Melek	Main role
İş Sanat Masal Tiyatrosu	2020	Tale characters	Main role
Prens	2023	Anarkhia	Main role
TV series
Title	Year	Role	Note
Çınaraltı	2003	Gizem	
Sınırlı Aşk	2003	Sultan	
Kurşun Yarası	2003	Lale	Joined
Büyük Umutlar	2004	Sevinç	Supporting role
Aşka Sürgün	2005	Dilan Şahvar	Supporting role
Ahh İstanbul	2006	Deniz	Supporting role
29-30	2006	Aysel	Main role
Dicle	2007	Dicle	Main role
Dudaktan Kalbe	2007–2009	Lamia Yılmaz	Main role
Kapalıçarşı	2009–2010	Diyar	Main role
Zehirli Sarmaşık	2011	Yakut	Main role
Bir Zamanlar Osmanlı: Kıyam	2012	Canseza	Main role
A.Ş.K.	2013	Şebnem	Main role
Oyunbozan	2016		Guest
Muhteşem Yüzyıl: Kösem	2016–2017	Gevherhan Sultan	Joined
Yuvamdaki Düşman	2018	Yasemin Çifthanli	Main role
Menajerimi Ara	2021	Herself	Guest
Üvey Anne	2023	İpek Zengin	Main role
Mehmed: Fetihler Sultanı	2026–present	Gülbahar Hatun	Main role
Films
Title	Year	Role	Note
Gülüm	2003	Gül	only as photo
Kabadayı	2007	Karaca	
Behzat Ç. Ankara Yanıyor	2013	llgın	
Kendime İyi Bak	2014	Begüm	
Git Başımdan	2015	Selin	
Bir Kahramanın Rüyası	2019		TV movie
Söz Vermiştin	2019	Lilyan	
Hayalet 3: Yaşam	2020		
Kadınlara Mahsus	2023	Melek Ünal	
Son Akşam Yemeği	2023	Elif's mother	
Dilemma	2024		
Theatre
Title	Year	Role	Note
Bütün Çılgınlar Sever Beni			
Ferhat ile Şirin			
Güldür Güldür	2018	Rose	Guest
Robot Pinokyo			
