= Emrah Yucel =

Turkish advertising professional

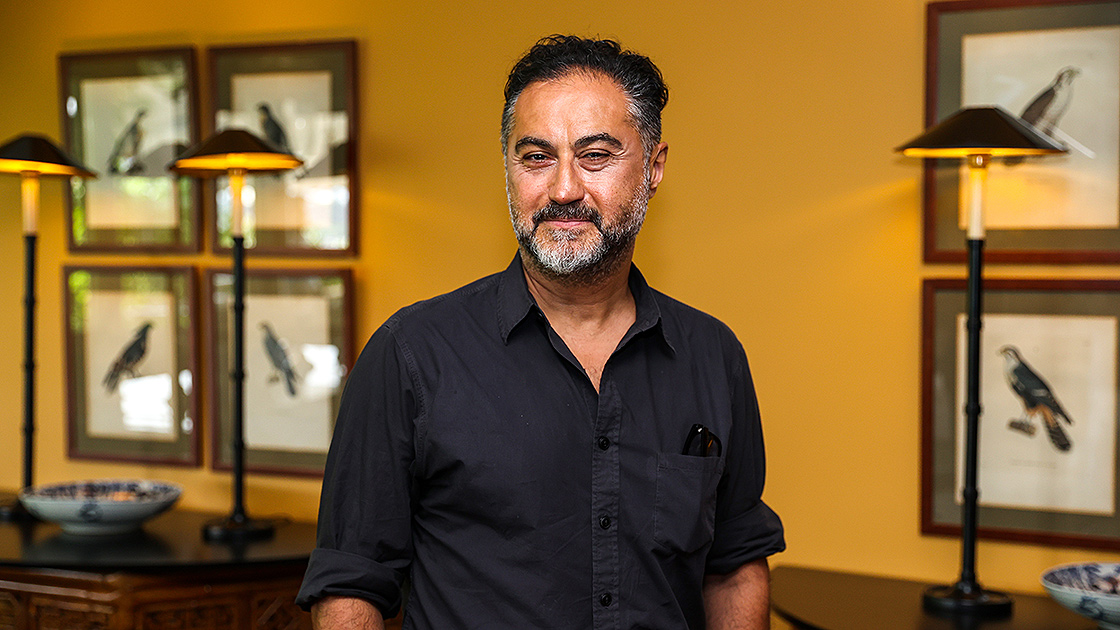
- Emrah Yucel at his office (2022)
- Born: May 24, 1968 (age 58)
- Occupations: Advertising and graphic designer

Emrah Yucel (born May 24, 1968), is a Turkish advertising and graphic designer based in Los Angeles, USA. He specialized in motion picture advertising as well as country and city branding.

Yucel was born as the son of a screenwriter mother and a film director father. While his father was working for the BBC at the time, he began elementary school in London. Those years influenced him to follow the path of a designer. After returning to Turkey, he continued his education and graduated from Hacettepe University. He subsequently received a master's degree in Art, Design and Architecture from Bilkent University. He also began his professional career during those formative years, representing his country in international exhibitions, poster biennials, following with two "Designer of the Year" awards in the field of graphic design.

In 1996, he moved to New York City where he established himself as a designer of corporate brands, posters for Broadway plays, and website designs during the infancy of the internet. Through a headhunter, he joined one of Hollywood's entertainment advertising agencies and moved to Los Angeles in 1999. As a senior art director, he created campaigns for several feature films for Hollywood's studios as well as designed other, domestic and international projects. He worked on projects such as Mirror Mirror, Kill Bill, What Women Want, Enemy at the Gates, Big Daddy, The Numbers, Shaft, 28 Days, etc... In 2001, he launched 'Iconisus Visual Communication Design' with his partner, an agency providing visual design, advertising, and branding services across print, motion, interactive and other media. Under the umbrella of four different companies, he and his team promote a culture of creative exchange across different platforms.

Emrah Yucel is also the founder of the Turkish Film Council (TFC), an organization bridging between the Turkish film industry and Hollywood. TFC lobbies to promote the Turkish film industry in the US. Council's bill preparation efforts led the Turkish parliament to pass incentives, attracting foreign filmmakers to use Turkey as a location (The International, starring Clive Owen and Naomi Watts, shot by Sony Pictures in Istanbul, Turkey being one of them). With the new incentive law, Turkey joined the list of preferred countries. Concurrently, Yucel is developing several film projects. 40 is the first film of his career as producer. He was a member of the jury at the 2007 Antalya International Film Festival, and the 2008 Lucie Awards (awarded in the field of international photography). Among the awards he has are Key-Art Awards, PromaxBDA awards, Webby Award, Sunset Billboard Award. In 2009, he and his team have been awarded the "Designer of the Year " title by International Design Awards. Most recently, the United Nations World Tourism Organization has deemed his campaign for Turkish Tourism as the best 'country advertising' in Europe.

Yucel currently resides in Los Angeles with his wife and two children.

== Awards ==
- PromaxBDA awards 2012

 Gold
 American Horror Story, Outdoor-Static Campaign 
 Agency: Iconisus - Emrah Yucel & Stephan Lapp

- PromaxBDA Awards
