= Rojbin =

Kurdish given name

Rojbin (pronunciation: /ˈɾoʒ.biːn/) is a Kurdish feminine given name meaning "one who sees the day". The name shows regional variation in Turkey: Rojbin is common around Diyarbakır, Rujbin and Rojvin are typical in Hakkari, and a male form of the name that is used among the Kurdish population in Turkey is Robin.

== In cinema and literature ==
Scene from Büyük Adam Küçük Aşk

In his 2019 sociological analysis of the film Büyük Adam Küçük Aşk, researcher Harun Özalp notes that when the character Sakine discloses her real name as Rojbin—recognized as a Kurdish name—it reveals her Kurdish identity and this is a reference to the challenges of claiming that identity. Notably, Sakine speaks openly only after sensing an attitude of acceptance rather than judgment from Mr. Rıfat.

== Human rights and discrimination context in Turkey ==
The name Rojbin has appeared in human rights reporting in connection with restrictions on Kurdish identity in Turkey. In Şirvan (Siirt), a case was reportedly filed against a family to change their child's Kurdish name, Rojbin, to a Turkish name under civil registration law. Historically, Kurdish names were often refused registration under regulations requiring conformity with Turkish linguistic norms.

Research using eye-tracking technology in Turkey has examined how cultural identifiers impact professional recruitment. In one study, a fictional candidate named "Rojbin" who also had other indicators of a Kurdish identity received lower proficiency ratings from recruiters compared to neutral candidates, despite having equivalent educational and professional qualifications, which the researchers associated with potential discrimination.

== Notable people ==
Notable people with the name include:

- Sevil Rojbin Çetin (born 1979), Turkish politician and former mayor of Edremit
- Rojbin Erden (born 1996), Turkish actress and model
- Rojbin Ören (born 1992), Turkish cross-country skier and coach
