= Ozan Dolunay =

Turkish actor

- Born: Mehmet Ozan Dolunay; 2 May 1990 (age 36); Ankara, Turkey
- Occupation: Actor
- Years active: 2015–present
- Height: 180 cm (5 ft 11 in)

Mehmet Ozan Dolunay (born 2 May 1990) is a Turkish actor. He is known for his role as Mert in Star TV series Yüksek Sosyete opposite Meriç Aral and as Cenk Karaçay in Kanal D series Zalim İstanbul.

== Life and career ==
Dolunay was born in 1990 in Ankara. After finishing his studies at Enka High School and Cleveland Heights High School, he enrolled in Koç University, pursuing a major in mechanical engineering. While he was studying, he began to take acting lessons at Craft Acting Workshops, and had his debut on television with the series Tatlı Küçük Yalancılar adaptation of Pretty Little Liars. His first professional experience on stage came with a role in the play Killology. For his performance in this play, he was nominated as the Best Young Talent at both Afife Jale Awards and Üstün Akmen Awards, the latter of which he won. He continued his career in television with a supporting role in Oyunbozan and a major role because of which he was recognized internationally in Yüksek Sosyete, later he was cast as lead actor in youth series Lise Devriyesi. He further rose to prominence with his role in the series Zalim İstanbul as Cenk Karaçay, who became the most popular character on social media month after month.

== Filmography ==
Film
Year	Title	Role	Notes
2021	Dijital Sahne: Bir Yaz Gecesi		Short Theatre
2023	Merve Kült	Anil Gürman	Leading role

Web series
Year	Title	Role	Notes
2021	Bizi Ayıran Çizgi	Sinan	Leading role

Television
Year	Title	Role	Notes
2015	Tatlı Küçük Yalancılar	Barış	Supporting role
2016	Oyunbozan	Rüzgar	Supporting role
2016	Yüksek Sosyete	Mert Çalhan	Leading role
2017	Lise Devriyesi	Yiğit Doğrusöz	Leading role
2018	Darısı Başımıza	Ozan Tekinsoy	Leading role
2019–2020	Zalim İstanbul	Cenk Karaçay	Leading role
2020	İyi Günde Kötü Günde	Sarp Karasu	Leading role
2020	Menajerimi Ara	Himself	Guest appearance
2021	Misafir	Giray	Leading role
2023	Dilek Taşı	Kenan Şanlı	Leading role
2024–2025	Kudüs Fatihi Selahaddin Eyyubi	Balian of Ibelin	Leading role

== Theatre ==
Theatre
Year	Title	Role
2018–2019	Killology	Davey
2021	Bir yaz gecesi Rüyası	Demetrius

== Awards and nominations ==
Year	Award	Category	Work	Result
2018	22nd Afife Jale Awards	Best Young Talent	Killology	Nominated
2018	Üstün Akmen Awards	Promising Actor of the Year	Killology	Won
