= Funda Eryiğit =

Turkish actress (born 1984)

- Born: 6 November 1984 (age 41); Zwolle, Netherlands
- Education: Istanbul University
- Occupation: Actress
- Years active: 2008–present
- Spouse: Berkun Oya (m. 2023)
- Children: 1

Funda Eryiğit (born 6 November 1984) is a Turkish actress.

== Early life ==
She is of Turkish, Circassian, and Georgian descent. After graduating from Kadir Has Anatolian High School, she studied International Relations at Istanbul University, and then graduated from Istanbul University State Conservatory Theater Department.

== Career ==
She won the Best Actress award in the musical / comedy category at the 18th Sadri Alışık Theater and Cinema Player Awards due to her performance in Sessizlik at Istanbul State Theater's 2012–2013 season. She has also been nominated for the Best Actress award at the 17th Afife Theater Awards.

She was first recognised for her role in popular series Canım Ailem. She was cast in comedy series İstanbul'un Altınları and crime series Uçurum. With Buğra Gülsoy, Uraz Kaygılaroğlu, she had leading role in series Eski Hikaye. She became international popular after playing the role of Esra in Gecenin Kraliçesi. She joined in the popular series "Karadayı", "Poyraz Karayel".

== Filmography ==
Film
Year	Title	Role
2010	Ev	Yeşim
2015	Limonata	Nihal
2015	Yok Artık!	Figen
2016	Tereddüt	Şehnaz
2018	Aden	Aras
2022	Cici	Havva (young)
2023	Boğa Boğa	Beyza
2024	Kül	Gökçe
Web Series
Year	Title	Role
2020	Hakan: Muhafız	Nisan / Valeriya
2020	Bir Başkadır	Ruhiye
TV Series
Year	Title	Role
2008–2009	Canım Ailem	Seyhan Yaman
2011	İstanbul'un Altınları	Ayşegül Altın Açık
2012	Uçurum	Pınar Kılınç
2013–2014	Eski Hikaye	Türkan
2014–2015	Karadayı	Belgin Türe
2016	Gecenin Kraliçesi	Esra Alkan
2016	Poyraz Karayel	Eda Bozkurt
2018	Mehmed: Bir Cihan Fatihi	Evdokya
2018	Can Kırıkları	Zeynep İnan
2021	Son Yaz	Canan Kara
Dubbing
Year	Title	Role
2016	Sürgün Türküleri: Yılmaz Güney	Narrator
