= Mert Yazıcıoğlu =

Turkish actor

- Born: 10 May 1993 (age 33); Turkey
- Citizenship: Turkish
- Education: Istanbul Aydın University Business Administration (dropped out)
- Occupation: Actor
- Years active: 2012–present
- Known for: Karagül; Aşk 101; Kızıl Goncalar

Mert Yazıcıoğlu (born 10 May 1993) is a Turkish actor. He is best known for portraying Baran in Black Rose (Turkish title: Karagül), Sinan in the teen romantic Netflix series Love 101, and Cüneyd Güneş in the controversial Turkish drama Red Roses (Turkish title: Kızıl Goncalar) for which he won various awards for his outstanding performance. In December 2024 he won the Golden Butterfly Award Best Actor for Cüneyd role in Red Roses.

== Early life ==
Mert Yazıcıoğlu was born on 10 May 1993 in Turkey. After completing his primary, secondary and high school education in Istanbul, he enrolled in the Business Administration Department at Istanbul Aydın University but then he dropped out to seek acting.

At the age of 18, his father Ayhan Yazıcıoğlu lost his life after a battle with illness.

== Career ==
Upon getting invited to the shooting of a TV series in which his friend was acting, he took the first step towards becoming an actor. First, he joined the Cast 33 agency founded by Sumru Onat and then met actor Ümit Çırak. He soon started to take acting lessons from Ümit Çırak in 3 Mota Eğitim workshops. After studying acting for a while, he made his cinematic debut with the period movie Dedemin İnsanları.

He played in series "Kayıp Şehir" alongside Taner Ölmez, Gökçe Bahadır, İlker Kaleli. In 2013, he played the character of "Baran Şamverdi" in the series Karagül for 125 episodes, which was broadcast on Fox and starred Ece Uslu, Özcan Deniz, Sevda Erginci and Ayça Ayşin Turan. It was through the series "Karagul" that he started to gain attention from Turkish drama lovers.

Later, he played the character of "Fırat" in the youth series Umuda Kelepçe Vurulmaz which ran for 15 episodes, and also portrayed the character of "Korkut" in the historical series Mehmed: Bir Cihan Fatihi, a series about the life of Ottoman sultan Fatih Sultan Mehmet.

He continued his cinematic career by playing the role of "Cenk" in the 2018 movie İyi Oyun. This film revolved around his character "Cenk" who is a recent high school graduate but extremely skilled video gamer.

Between 2018 and 2019, he had a leading role in Kanal D series Bir Litre Gözyaşı, in which he portrayed the character "Mahir Yetkin" alongside Miray Daner. The series was nominated as Best TV Series by Turkey Youth Awards in 2019.

In 2020 he starred in the drama Bir Annenin Günahı adapted from the Filipino drama, A Mother's Guilt as "Yusuf", alongside Özge Özberk who starred as his mother. This series only aired for 5 episodes before it was cancelled due to low viewership.

In 2020–2021, he starred in Netflix original series Aşk 101. The series which lasted 2 seasons, became one of Netflix's most popular series, receiving 5 wins and 6 nominations from various awards such as Ayaklı Gazete TV Stars Awards and Turkey Youth Awards.

He then played in Exxens surreal crime limited series Ölüm Zamanı. This series consisted of 8 episodes. In 2022, he starred in the Turkish youth series Darmaduman, and portrayed the character of Kerem Servet.

In 2023, he acted alongside Burak Özçivit in OGM Pictures's Berber directed by Deniz Yorulmazer. The film, in which Özçivit plays a barber named Önder and Yazıcıoğlu plays his apprentice named Ali, will be released on Netflix. However, the date of airing for the film is yet to be announced.

From 2023 until 2025, he also starred as "Cüneyd Güneş" where he reunited with actor Özcan Deniz in the series Kizil Goncalar (Red Roses). His portrayal as "Cüneyd Güneş" received many positive significant reviews and the drama itself received steady high ratings during its first season of 19 episodes, and moderate ratings during its second season. The second season ended in April 2025, with 27 episodes.

In December 2024 he received his first Golden Butterfly Award for his performance in Kızıl Goncalar.

In October 2025 he portrayed the sultan of the ottoman empire Orhan in the well-known historical television series Kuruluş: Orhan. The series ended its run in June 2026 due to the declining viewership.

In June 2026, it was announced that Yazıcıoğlu's next project will be on Netflix under the name Aras and the filming will start in June 2027.

== Filmography ==
=== Television ===
Year	Title	Role	Network	Ref.
2012	Kayıp Şehir	Furkan	Kanal D	
2013 – 2016	Karagül	Baran Şamverdi	FOX Turkey	
2016 – 2017	Umuda Kelepçe Vurulmaz	Fırat	FOX Turkey	
2018	Mehmed: Bir Cihan Fatihi	Korkut	Kanal D	
2018 – 2019	Bir Litre Gözyaşı	Mahir Yetkin	Kanal D	
2020	Bir Annenin Günahı	Yusuf	Kanal D	
2020 – 2021	Love 101	Sinan	Netflix	
2021	Ölüm Zamanı	Cüneyt	Exxen	
2022	Darmaduman	Kerem Servet	FOX Turkey	
2023–2025	Kızıl Goncalar	Cüneyd Güneş	NOW	
2025-2026	Kuruluş: Orhan	Orhan Bey	ATV	
2027	Aras	Aras	Netflix	

=== Film ===
Year	Title	Role	Notes	Ref.
2011	Dedemin İnsanları	Uncredited		
2018	İyi Oyun	Cenk		
2023	Berber	Ali	Netflix Original Film	

== Accolades ==
Year	Award	Category	Project	Result	Ref.
2021	9th Ayaklı Newspaper Awards	Best Actor in a Web Series	Love 101	Won	
2023	13rd Kemal Sunal Culture and Art Awards	Best Actor		Won	
2024	10th Ayaklı Newspaper Awards	Outstanding Performance of the Year	Kızıl Goncalar	Won	
2024	9th Fine Arts School Mimar Sinan Awards	Mimar Sinan of the Year	Kızıl Goncalar	Won	
2024	10th Elle Style Awards	Stylish Actor of the Year		Won	
2024	1st Filmsan Cinema and Television Awards	Best TV Actor	Kızıl Goncalar	Won	
2024	24th. Magazinci Best of the Year Awards	Best Screen Performance of the Year	Kızıl Goncalar	Won	
2024	50th Golden Butterfly Awards	Best Actor	Kızıl Goncalar	Won	
2024	50th Golden Butterfly Awards	Best Couple (with Mina Demirtaş)	Kızıl Goncalar	Nominated	
2024	10th Golden 61 Awards	Best Actor	Kızıl Goncalar	Won	
2025	23rd YTU Stars of the Year Awards	Most Admired TV Actor	Kızıl Goncalar	Won	
2025	19th GSU EN Awards	Best TV/Film Actor	Kızıl Goncalar	Nominated	
2025	GQ Men of the Year Awards	Actor of the Year		Won	
