= Medcezir =

Turkish teen drama television series

- Genre: Teen drama Comedy drama
- Created by: Josh Schwartz
- Written by: Ece Yörenç; Melek Gençoğlu
- Directed by: Ali Bilgin
- Starring: Çağatay Ulusoy; Serenay Sarıkaya; Barış Falay; Mine Tugay; Hazar Ergüçlü; Taner Ölmez
- Theme music composer: Toygar Işıklı
- Country of origin: Turkey
- Original language: Turkish
- No. of seasons: 2
- No. of episodes: 77

Production
- Producer: Kerem Çatay
- Production locations: Istanbul; Bursa
- Running time: 90-120 min.
- Production companies: Ay Yapım; Warner Bros. International Television Production

Original release
- Network: Star TV
- Release: 13 September 2013 – 12 June 2015

Related
- The O.C.

Medcezir (Tide) is a Turkish teen drama series written by Ece Yörenç and Melek Gençoğlu. It is an adaptation of the American TV series The O.C., created by Josh Schwartz. The story revolves around Yaman Koper, a boy with a poor background and disturbed family life portrayed by Çağatay Ulusoy, and a rich girl named Mira Beylice, portrayed by Serenay Sarıkaya.

Medcezir first premiered on 13 September 2013 on Star TV. Due to its high ratings, the series was renewed for a second season which premiered on 12 September 2014. Director Ali Bilgin stated that the series would be renewed for a third season. However, as the second season did not receive as high ratings as its preceding season, scenarist Ece Yörenç confirmed that the series would end with two seasons. The series ended on 12 June 2015 with 77 episodes in total.

With a turnover of ₺25.6 million by the end of season one, Medcezir became the fifth most successful series in Turkey in terms of net sales and earning the producer as much as possible.

== Plot ==
Yaman who lives in Tozludere one lower socioeconomic area of Istanbul's suburbs, has always tried to change his destiny by working hard to earn a good life. On the day of his brother Kenan’s birthday, they are both arrested because Yaman’s brother steals a car from a gas station. That evening, Yaman's destiny changes when he meets Selim Serez, a wealthy lawyer who helps him out of jail. Selim sees Yaman as a promising young man and offers him help. When Yaman's mom kicks him out of the house, he is forced to contact Selim and accept his help. He then goes to Selim's house in Altınkoy, an exclusive upper-class neighborhood in Istanbul, and is offered a job as a gardener for a week, as well as a place to live in the pool house outside the main house. Even though Yaman is aware that there are no miracles in real life, he doesn't have another option other than going through that door. Carrying the weight of the world on his shoulders, surrounded by people he doesn't know, he faces a more difficult life than the one he had in Tozludere. In Altınkoy he meets Mert, Selim's son, with whom he immediately becomes friends. He also meets Mira, a young, beautiful rich girl who lives next door and they fall in love.

Challenges arise for the young Yaman who enrols in the Asım Şekip Kaya University along with Mira, Mert, Eylül and their friends.

Orkun, Mira's ex- boyfriend, is envious of Yaman and creates problems for him deliberately to get him out of Altınkoy. He joins alliances with Hasan, Yaman's stepfather, in this plan.

== Cast and characters ==
=== Main cast ===
Actor	Character	Episodes	Description
Actor	Character	Episodes	Description
Çağatay Ulusoy	Yaman Koper	1-77	He is Nevin's son, and he is Kenan's brother. He is Mira's husband. He is Faruk and Sude's son-in-law. He is Hasan's stepson. He is Beren's brother-in-law.
Serenay Sarıkaya	Mira Beylice/Koper	1-77	She is the daughter of Sude and Faruk and she is Beren's sister. She is Yaman's wife. She is Asım Șekip's stepdaughter, and she is the stepsister of Ender and Sedef. She was part of the group of wealthy young people from Altınkoy.
Barış Falay	Selim Serez	1-77	He is Ender's husband and Mert's father. He is Asım Șekip's son-in-law and Sedef's brother-in-law.
Mine Tugay	Ender Kaya/Serez	1-38	She is Selim's wife, and she is Mert's mother. She is Sedef's sister, and she is Asım Șekip's daughter. She is Sude's stepdaughter and she is Beren and Mira's stepsister.
Metin Akdülger	Orkun Civanoğlu	1-77	He is the son of Mithat and Yasemin and he is Mira's ex-fiance. He has serious mental health problems. He was part of the group of wealthy young people from Altınkoy.
Taner Ölmez	Mert Serez	1-77	He is the son of Selim and Ender and he is Eylül's boyfriend. He is Sedef's nephew and the is Asım Șekip's grandson. He is Sude's step-grandson and he is the step-nephew of Beren and Mira.
Hazar Ergüçlü	Eylül Buluter	1-77	She is Barış's daughter, and she is Mert's girlfriend. She is Gamze's stepdaughter. She is Mira's best friend. She was part of the group of wealthy young people from Altınkoy.

=== Recurring ===
Actor	Character	Episodes	Description
Actor	Character	Episodes	Description
Şebnem Dönmez	Asude "Sude" Beylice/ Sude Kaya	1-77	She is the mother of Beren and Mira, and the ex-wife of Faruk and Asım Șekip. She is Ender and Sedef's stepmother and she is Mert's step-grandmother. She is Yaman's mother-in-law. She is a cunning woman who is obsessed with money and luxury.
Defne Kayalar	Sedef Kaya	19-77	She is Ender's sister and she Asım Șekip daughter. She is Mert's aunt and Selim's sister-in-law. She is Sude's stepdaughter, and she is Beren and Mira's stepsister.
Murat Aygen	Faruk Beylice	1-77	He is the father of Beren and Mira, and he is Sude's ex-husband. He is Yaman's father-in-law.
Miray Daner	Beren Beylice	1-77	She is the daughter of Faruk and Sude and she is Mira's younger sister. She is Asım Șekip's stepdaughter. She is the half-sister of Ender and Sedef. She is Mert's step-aunt. She is Yaman's sister-in-law. She is an arrogant, spoiled, and gossiping person. She is always dissatisfied and wants everyone to do exactly what she wants. She was in love with Orkun and Giray. She was part of the group of wealthy young people from Altınkoy.
Can Gürzap	Asım Şekip Kaya	1-50, 52, 55-76	He is the father of Ender and Sedef and he is Mert's grandfather. He is Sude's ex-husband and the stepfather of Beren and Mira.
Ali Aksöz	Kenan Koper	1-52, 55-69	He is Nevin's son and he is Yaman's brother. He is Hasan's stepson. He is Mira's brother-in-law. He is Ayșe's ex-boyfriend.
Meriç Aral	Hale	1-77	She is Orkun's ex-girlfriend. She is Tuğçe and Eda's friend. She was part of the group of wealthy young people from Altınkoy.
Ecem Akbin	Tuğçe	1-70	She is Doruk's girlfriend. She is Eylül and Mira's friend. She was in love with Mert. She was part of wealthy young people from Altınkoy.
Ezgi Sözüer	Eda	1-76	She is Burak's girlfriend. She is Tuğçe and Hale's friend. She was part of wealthy young people from Altınkoy.
Batuhan Ekşi	Doruk	1-75	He is Tuğçe's boyfriend. He was friends with Orkun and Burak. He was part of the group of wealthy young people from Altınkoy.
Batuhan Begimgil	Burak	1-77	He is Eda's boyfriend. He is Orkun and Doruk's former friend. He was part of the group of wealthy young people from Altınkoy.
Hare Sürel	Leyla	2, 14-19, 21, 29-31, 33-38, 41-77	She is Yaman's ex-girlfriend
Mert Tanık	Barış Buluter	1-75	He is Eylül's father and Gamze's husband.
Nihan Aslı Elmas	Gamze Buluter/Ongun	1-75	She is Barış's wife and Eylül's stepmother.
Cenk Kangöz	Hasan	1-75	He is Nevin's husband and the stepfather of Yaman and Kenan. He is Mira's stepfather-in-law.
Sibel Taşçıoğlu	Nevin Koper	1-75	She is Yaman and Kenan's mother, and she is Hasan's wife. She is Mira's mother-in-law.
Serhat Parıl	Giray	1-75	He is Beren's ex-boyfriend. He is Ayșe's ex-husband.
Pınar Tuncegil	Ayşe	1-75	She is Kenan's ex-girlfriend. She is Giray's ex-wife.
Kürşat Alnıaçık	Nadir Baktıroğlu/Turunç Nadir	32-58	
Berk Erçer	Sinan Enveroğlu		
Saim Karakale	Tan Çakmaklı	8-34	
Ayşe Melike Çerçi	Reyhan Arsen	21-38	
Özge Gürel	Ada	7-38	
Barış Alpaykut	Uzay Tezkan	38-77	
Aybüke Pusat	Elif	39-75	
Aslı Orcan	Deniz Yekeli	38-77	
Burak Deniz	Aras	65-77	
Turhan Cihan Şimşek	Ali	64-77	
Nurcan Eren	Süreyya	21-26, 64-77	
Gözde Kansu	Olcay	68-75	
Çağla Demir	Ceren	54-77	
Nihat Altınkaya	Kaan Mavideniz	41-54, 71-77	

== Production ==
=== Development ===
In January 2013, it was reported that Ay Yapım was planning to produce the series under the title Aşk Hikayesi and was trying to negotiate with Çağatay Ulusoy for the leading role. As in March 2013 a series with the title Bir Aşk Hikayesi began to air on television, the production company changed the series name to Medcezir. One of the screenwriters, Ece Yörenç, revealed some details about the series on Twitter on 29 June 2013. Yörenç named a few members of the main cast and stated that series would begin in September. It was also revealed that it would be an adaptation of the American TV series The O.C.. On 21 July 2013, it was reported that the principal shooting would begin on 2 August. On 1 August the cast and crew came together to go over the scenario and on 2 August the first promotional videos were recorded in Tuzla. The first promotional video was released on 6 August. The other screenwriter, Melek Gençoğlu, later announced that he would stop working on the series after the 8th episode. Due to receiving high ratings, the series was renewed for a second season. The shooting for the second season began on the second week of August 2014 and it premiered on 12 September 2014. While the second season was being aired, director Ali Bilgin stated that the series would be renewed for a third season. However, due to low ratings, scenarist Ece Yörenç confirmed that the second season would be the final season of the series. It ended on 12 June 2015 with 77 episodes in total.

=== Crew ===
The project an adaptation of the work by Josh Schwartz, and the main team of writers consisted of Ece Yörenç and Melek Gençoğlu for the first eight episodes. After the eighth episode, Ece Yörenç became the main screenwriter for the series. Burcu Görgün Toptaş and Pelin Taran Cura also joined the crew as assistant writers. The script was edited by Serdar Çakular and Ali Bilgin directed all the 77 episodes. Deniz Yorulmazer served as the series' second director, and Semih Bağcı took the position of assistant director. The series was produced by Kerem Çatay and Ali Erdoğan served as the general coordinator. Rezzan Çakır served as the cast manager, while Onur Tuğ was named the series' artistic director and Barış Işık became its cinematographer. Deniz Marşan and Başar Dizer were fashion consultants to the actors and Ömer Lekesiz took charge of the production team as the main manager.

=== Music ===
Toygar Işıklı was asked to create the music for the series. Işıklı created the music for the main title and all the different themes for the series. In 2014, Medcezir won the Best TV Music award at the 2nd Turkey Music Awards and in 2015 it received a nomination in the same category. Also in 2014, it won the Best TV Music award at the Magnum Golden Butterfly Awards. Television critic Gizem Kaboğlu commented on the success of the series' soundtrack by praising Toygar Işıklı and believed that it was good enough to revive the memories of The O.C.'s legendary music. The characters Mira (Serenay Sarıkaya) and Yaman (Çağatay Ulusoy) perform many different songs in a number of episodes. In the third episode, Mira performs one of Ajda Pekkan's song from 1990 titled "Yaz Yaz Yaz" and the video of this scene became one of the most watched videos on Internet in Turkey. In the sixth episode, Mira and Yaman performed Mazhar Alanson's 2002 song "Ah Bu Ben". The promotional teaser for the second season featured a song by Kibariye titled "Sil Baştan" and garnered positive reviews. Serenay Sarıkaya also commented and said that "Kibariye, and Sil Baştan both had a huge impact" on bringing out the positive reviews for the teaser. In episode 42, Barış Falay performed a song with lyrics taken out of a poem by Omar Khayyam. His performance was praised by fans and critics alike. Aslı Orcan performed the song together with Falay. Milliyet wrote that all the songs in the series were successfully performed with good compositions and vocals. Many old and new songs such as "Sevdim Seni Bir Kere", "Masum Değiliz", "Kandırdım", "Senden Daha Güzel", "Benim Ol", "Sen Ona Aşıksın" and "Kafa" were performed in different episodes by various characters and used on the series' soundtrack. The song "Bir Kuyruklu Yıldıza Mektup" was prepared specially for the series and was first performed with instruments in episode 54. The version which contained the lyrics was first performed by Çağatay Ulusoy and Serenay Sarıkaya in episode 61. Halil Sezai and Çiğdem Erken made a guest appearance in the series and performed the song "Dünyayı Durduran Şarkı". The song was again performed by Serenay Sarıkaya and Çağatay Ulusoy in the series' finale.

=== Filming ===
Medcezir was mostly filmed in Istanbul. The story was set in Altınkoy, and the scenes were recorded in the district of Tuzla in Istanbul. The scenes taking placed at the university were filmed at Istanbul Kemerburgaz University located in Bağcılar. The place called Tozludere in the series was in fact Mustafa Kemal Neighborhood in Ümraniye. Altınkoy and Tozludere are both fictional places created by the screenwriters. The scene involving the holding were filmed in Ataşehir as well as in Uludağ, Bursa. Other locations included Şile, Büyükada and Karaköy.

== Reception ==
=== Critical reception ===
Medcezir received positive reviews from most critics and was claimed to be even better than The O.C.. Writing for Sabah, Yüksel Aytuğ mentioned that "Medcezir has brought a breath of fresh air to television with its first episode, but unfortunately I see from the first episode that the scenario has some troubles". It was initially determined by Warner Bros. that following the popularity of The O.C, the series was to be made by Ay Yapım to invest in a number of other countries, however Medcezir became more popular than The O.C. in many countries and was promoted by Warner Bros. as one of the most successful TV series in the world. The vice president for format development and marketing of Warner Bros., Andrew Zein, gave an interview to Television Business International magazine in which he said that Medcezir was a very successful series on a world-wide scale among the productions adapted from their works, and that Medcezir was very striking and engaging as an iconic project. American magazines Variety and The Hollywood Reporter reported on the Turkish version of The O.C. and found it to be made in accordance with worldwide standards. Shortly after the first episode of Medcezir was broadcast, Agos called it The New Phenomenon of the Screen and added that it "is already a candidate for being one of the best series of this season". Ayşe Karaduman, who wrote a review on Radikal's website, commented that "The series that brought together all the talented and experienced actors as a cast, has a script that completely fell below my expectation." She believed that the cast of Medcezir were good, but the script was weak and not genuine at all. Another Radikal writer, Zeynep Gönenli, commented that "for an adaptation, to be different from its original work and to not be like it, and to do it without ruining the story is something that is not common at all". For the first season, the script for Medcezir was closely based on The O.C. but it was later announced that the second season would progress in a different way.

After the series ended, the former governor of Istanbul Hüseyin Avni Mutlu commented on the finale: "43 years ago the finale of Love Story and now the end of Medcezir left us devastated". Media reported that the finale of the series was written cleverly and would surprise the audience. Writing for Vatan, Oya Doğan believed the finale was the way that the viewers wanted it to be and added that the series was successful in leaving its influence behind. The website for Milliyet newspaper published a list of successful series with high ratings, in which the name of Medcezir also appeared as one of the unforgettable shows. In another article on Milliyet's website the finale was described as an ending "fitting the name Medcezir, a great farewell". On the day the finale was set to air, the hashtag "#hiçunutmayacağız" (we'llneverforget) was used by fans on Twitter, which ranked first on the Trend Topic list hours before the episode was broadcast and after five hours with 106,326 tweets it became the most frequently used hashtag on the platform. The website N'oluyo published an article by Nida Fındık, who said that she would remember the series as a fairy tale and added that it had created a very beautiful two years for its audience.

=== Popular culture ===
When the series became a phenomenon on social media, the fans began to label the characters Mira and Yaman as Yamira. A website called Eylül'ün Notları (Eylül's Notes) was opened as the series began and the website was used by the character Eylül in the TV series. The character also wore outfits chosen and suggested by fans on the website. At the same time, many contests were organized with the participation of fans through an Instagram account opened for Eylül. Following the competitions, the winners met with Hazar Ergüçlü, who portrayed Eylül in the series, and took part in various activities with her such as shopping and received special invitations. Virtual games related to the series were prepared on some video game websites.

=== Ratings ===
The first episode received a rating of 5,14 in the total group during the prime time becoming the most watched program in that category, and ranked third in the group AB with a rating of 4,63. The following episode ranked fourth in total and second in the AB category. Medcezir ranked fourth and sixth in the EU in terms of the most watched TV series with the ratings it received in the first weeks of its broadcasting. The first episode of the second season ranked first in both the total and AB groups with the rating of 6,77 and 8,87 respectively. The episode that aired three weeks before the finale did not rank among the most watched series in the total group and ranked eight in the AB category. The final episode ranked eighth in both the total and AB groups.

Season	Episodes	Originally aired		Rating	
Season	Episodes	First aired	Last aired	Premiere	Finale
1	38	September 13, 2013	June 13, 2014	5,14	5,36
2	39	September 12, 2014	June 12, 2015	6,77	4,70

== Awards and nominations ==
After its release, Medcezir won many awards and received various other nominations. It received its first award at the 2013 Siyaset Dergisi Awards and it received the Best TV Series of the Year, the Best TV Actress and the Best TV Actors awards. At the 2014 Ayaklı Newspaper TV Stars Awards, the series was nominated in various categories, including the Best Drama Series, the Best Drama TV Actor, and the Best Drama TV Actress, out of which it won six awards in total. In the same year, Medcezir won the Best Drama Series award at the Bilkent Television Awards, the Most Successful Series award at theİTÜ Achievement Awards, and the Best TV Series award at the Galatasaray University The Bests Awards. In 2014, Serenay Sarıkaya won the Best Actress award at the Magnum Golden Butterfly Awards and the composer was awarded with the Best Music award. The series also won the Best TV Music award at the 2nd Turkey Music Awards and was nominated in the same category in 2015. Medcezir was a nominee at the Seoul International Drama Awards for the Best Drama Series award and was ranked second. Çağatay Ulusoy was also nominated for the Best Actor award.

== International broadcasting ==
Medcezir gained a lot of popularity among Turkic countries (especially in Azerbaijan), Iran (especially Iranian Azerbaijan), Balkans, Latin America (especially Chile, and Pakistan where it has been a complete success), and Arab countries. In Bulgaria the series takes the second place in September 2015 with almost one million viewers and it is the most watched series in the country.

Country	Network	Local title	Series premiere	Timeslot
Northern Cyprus	Star TV	Medcezir	13 September 2013	20:00
Pakistan	Urdu 1	آشیانہ میری محبت کا	25 November 2014 and June 2019	22:00
Romania	Kanal D	Yaman	12 December 2014	20:00
United Arab Emirates	OSN	مد جزر	2 February 2015	
Latvia	LNT	Paisums	9 May 2015	17:10
Georgia	Imedi TV	გზაჯვარედინი	8 June 2015	10:00
Bulgaria	bTV	Кварталът на богатите	7 July 2015	20:00
Afghanistan	Jawan TV	Medcezir	2015	19:30
Chile	Mega	Medcezir	20 April 2016	22:30; 23:30
Lithuania	TV8	Gyvenimo bangos	10 June 2016	18:00
Croatia	Doma TV	Plima i Oseka	12 September 2016	16:50
United States	Pasiones TV	Medcezir	6 February 2017	19:00
Argentina	Canal 13	Medcezir	7 February 2017	22:30
Uruguay	Teledoce	Medcezir	6 March 2017	23:30
Colombia	Caracol TV	Medcezir	28 May 2017	15:30
Iran	MBC Persia	جزرومد	1 December 2018	21:00
Israel	Viva	גאות ושפל	18 March 2021	19:00
Saudi Arabia	MBC 4	المد والجزر	September 3, 2022	21:00
Peru	Latina televisión	Medcezir	soon (2022)	
