= Üç Kuruş =

2021 Turkish television series

- Series poster
- Genre: Comedy; Action; Drama; Crime
- Written by: Damla Serim; Eset Akçilad; Murat Uyurkulak
- Directed by: Sinan Öztürk
- Starring: Uraz Kaygılaroğlu; Ekin Koç; Diren Polatoğulları
- Composer: Toygar Işıklı
- Country of origin: Turkey
- Original language: Turkish
- No. of seasons: 1
- No. of episodes: 28

Production
- Producer: Kerem Çatay
- Production location: Istanbul
- Running time: 120 minutes
- Production company: Ay Yapım

Original release
- Network: Show TV
- Release: 1 November 2021 – 22 May 2022

Üç Kuruş (transl. "The Three Pennies") is a Turkish action, comedy drama and crime television series, made by Ay Yapım, directed by Sinan Öztürk, written by Damla Serim, Eset Akçilad and Murat Uyurkulak, the first episode of which was broadcast on November 1, 2021. The leading roles are shared by Uraz Kaygılaroğlu, Ekin Koç, Aslıhan Malbora and Diren Polatoğulları.

== Plot ==
A serial killer (Diren Polatoğulları) is stalking Çıngıraklı, a tight-knit Romani neighborhood with little regard for outsiders. He leaves three pennies on each of his victims’ body, and the case is assigned to the Organized Crime Unit. Its captain, Efe (Ekin Koç), initially suspects Kartal (Uraz Kaygılaroğlu), a Romani mafia leader who is the neighborhood “protector” and Efe's target. However, as Efe realizes that Kartal is not the killer, the cop and the mafia leader form an uneasy alliance to find Çıngıraklı's “Three Penny serial Killer.”

Efe has always looked at Kartal's neighborhood as a breeding ground for criminals and lowlifes, but this case helps him see through the Romani perspective. The unexpected connection between the Three Penny serial Killer and Kartal's tragic past will call into question everything he believes.

== Filming ==
While the series was shot in the Balat district of the Fatih district of Istanbul and the Çayırbaşı district of the Sarıyer district, some scenes take place in the old shoe factory in Beykoz.

== Cast and characters ==
=== Main characters ===
- Kartal Çaka (Uraz Kaygılaroğlu): The leader of the Çıngıraklı neighbourhood. He killed Nezih, Korkmaz, Baybars and Kılıç. He was husband of Bahar.
- Efe Tekin (Ekin Koç): Police officer whose aim is to put Kartal in jail but falls in love with his sister instead. He is husband of Leyla.
- İrfan Kahraman\Ferhan Şensoy (Diren Polatoğulları): A serial killer who worked as musician at night. He sees Kartal as his brother. He was shot and killed by Efe.
- Bahar Çaka (Nesrin Cavadzade): Nezih Yöndel's daughter. Wife of Kartal. She was killed by Baybars.
- Leyla Çaka Tekin (Aslıhan Malbora): Kartal's sister, later Efe’s wife.
- Neriman Çaka (Nursel Köse): Kartal's aunt. Killed by Kılıç.
- Oktay Çaka (Civan Canova): Kartal's father. He lost his right arm because of Baybars in 1997.
- Nezih Yöndel (Zafer Algöz): Bahar's father. He was working for Baybars. He was shot and killed by Kartal.
- Baybars (Kadir Çermik): Mafia leader. He killed İrfan / Ferhan's mother and cut off Oktay's arm in 1997. He was killed by Kartal.
- Azade (Sezin Akbaşoğulları): Crime leader. She was working for Baybars. Killed by poisoning through a cup of coffee prepared by Şahin.
- Mesut (Cenk Kangöz): Kartal's ex enemy and his ally, used to work for Nezih. He was killed by Baybars' men.
- Şesu (Uğur Yıldıran): One of Kartal's closest friends.
- Şahin (Umutcan Ütebay): Kartal's brother. He used to work for Baybars. But when Kılıç killed Neriman, he became Kılıç's and Baybars' enemy.
- Ruşen (Mustafa Kırantepe): Kartal's close friend.
- Konyalı (Berk) (Alişan Uğur): A professional hacker. He used to abuse drugs but became clean with help from Kartal. After Kartal went to jail, Konyalı lapsed and started using again.
- Halide Çaka (Damla Makar): Kartal, Leyla and Şahin's niece.
- Çetin (Bora Akkaş): Baybars' son and enemy. Kılıç's younger brother. Kartal's cousin.
- Kılıç Hicaz (Necip Memili): Baybars' son. Çetin's elder brother. He killed Neriman. He was choked by Kartal in jail and he died.
- Korkmaz (Mehmet Bozdoğan): Mafia leader. He was working for Baybars. Efe killed Korkmaz's brother Can but Kartal took the fall. So, Korkmaz shot Kartal's father Oktay and avenged his brother Can. After three years, Kartal trapped Korkmaz and killed him.
- Bahar Tekin (Elisa Akar):Efe and Leyla's daughter.

== Songs ==
No.	Title	Length
1.	"Yolcu - (Neşet Ertaş)"
2.	"Ay İnanmıyorum - (Aşkın Nur Yengi)"
3.	"Metal On Metal (Dr. Skull)"
4.	"Para Bizde (Salih Kaptan)"
5.	"Fasulya (Tepecikli Barış Özbaylar)"
6.	"Tepecikli mi (Tepecikli Barış Özbaylar)"
7.	"Kudur (Mariye) - (Tepecikli Barış Özbaylar)"
8.	"Gül Ali (Tepecikli Barış Özbaylar)"
9.	"Çalın Davulları"
10.	"Durmam Gayri Bu Diyarda (Yunus Taşkın)"
11.	"Geze Geze Dert Oldu"
12.	"Drama Köprüsü"
13.	"Yalnız Ölü Balıklar Akıntıyı Takip Eder (Ali Güçlü Şimşek)"
14.	"Sofu Baba (Mahzuni Şerif)"
15.	"Cemilem"
16.	"Esmerim Biçim Biçim"
17.	"Kayinço (Burhan Öcal & The Trakya All Stars)"
18.	"Serzenişte (Vega)"
19.	"Yaşamak İstiyorsan Live (Dr. Skull)"
20.	"Her Şey Yolunda (Dr. Skull)"
21.	"Mevlam Bir Çok Dert Vermiş (Emin ve grubu)"
22.	"Al Fadimem - Islık (Zafer Algöz)"
23.	"Yarım Hava Çalsana (Suzan Kardeş)"
24.	"Şu Kanlı Zalimin Ettiği İşler (Diren Polatoğulları)"
25.	"Dostum Dostum (Diren Polatoğulları)"
26.	"Aldırma Gönül"
27.	"Vay Canım Vay"
28.	"Beni Hor Görme (Aşık Veysel)"
29.	"Gündüz Gece (Pentagram)"
30.	"Uzun İnce Bir Yoldayım (Aşık Veysel)"
31.	"Serseri (Teoman)"
32.	"Yaşamak İstiyorum (Dr. Skull)"
33.	"Kuşlu Gazel (Mazlum Çimen)"
34.	"Pınar Başında Bulanır"
35.	"Su Ver Leylam (Lara Di Lara)"
36.	"Forsa (Mor Ve Ötesi)"
37.	"Linç (Mor Ve Ötesi)"
38.	"Leyla (Pinhani)"
39.	"Sen Benim Şarkılarımsın (Gündoğarken)"
40.	"Bana Sorma (Cem Adrian)"

== Episodes ==
=== Season 1 (2021–2022) ===
Episode	Episode name	Writer	Director	Release date	Rating (Total)	Rank (Total)	Rating (AB)	Rank (AB)	Rating (ABC1)	Rank (ABC1)	Summary
Episode 1	Do You Think Can We Agree?	Damla Serim and Murat Uyurkulak	Sinan Öztürk	1 November 2021	6.60	2.	4.82	4.	6.92	3.	
Episode 2	I Recognize This Look	Damla Serim and Murat Uyurkulak	Sinan Öztürk	8 November 2021	5.12	5.	4.84	5.	5.89	4.	
Episode 3	Father's Precious	Damla Serim and Murat Uyurkulak	Sinan Öztürk	15 November 2021	6.32	4.	5.80	2.	6.90	3.	
Episode 4	I Have A Dream	Damla Serim and Murat Uyurkulak	Sinan Öztürk	22 November 2021	4.76	6.	3.93	8.	5.17	8.	
Episode 5	I'm Ferhan	Damla Serim and Murat Uyurkulak	Sinan Öztürk	29 November 2021							
Episode 6	Wedding And Funeral	Damla Serim, Murat Uyurkulak and Eset Akçilad	Sinan Öztürk	6 December 2021							
Episode 7	Thanks to My Father	Damla Serim, Murat Uyurkulak and Eset Akçilad	Sinan Öztürk	13 December 2021							
Episode 8	Everyone Deserves A Second Chance [Do they?]	Damla Serim, Murat Uyurkulak and Eset Akçilad	Sinan Öztürk	20 December 2021							
Episode 9	War or War	Damla Serim, Murat Uyurkulak and Eset Akçilad	Sinan Öztürk	27 December 2021							
Episode 10	The Men Who Cost Three Cents	Damla Serim, Murat Uyurkulak and Eset Akçilad	Sinan Öztürk	17 January 2022							
Episode 11	My Enemy's Enemy is My Friend	Damla Serim, Murat Uyurkulak and Eset Akçilad	Sinan Öztürk	24 January 2022							
Episode 12	Snakes in Our Bosom	Damla Serim, Murat Uyurkulak and Eset Akçilad	Sinan Öztürk	31 January 2022							
Episode 13	Fathers and Sons	Damla Serim and Eset Akçilad	Sinan Öztürk	7 February 2022							
Episode 14	It Is Your Choice	Damla Serim and Eset Akçilad	Sinan Öztürk	14 February 2022							
Episode 15	I Came, I Saw, I Deleted	Damla Serim and Eset Akçilad	Sinan Öztürk	21 February 2022							
Episode 16	Let Not Even A Dust Remain	Damla Serim, Eset Akçilad and Berrin Tekdemir	Sinan Öztürk	28 February 2022							
Episode 17	Dangerous Games	Damla Serim, Eset Akçilad and Berrin Tekdemir	Sinan Öztürk	7 March 2022							
Episode 18	New World	Damla Serim, Eset Akçilad and Berrin Tekdemir	Sinan Öztürk	14 March 2022							
Episode 19	Ateş's Father	Damla Serim, Eset Akçilad and Berrin Tekdemir	Sinan Öztürk	21 March 2022							
Episode 20	There Is No Time To Lose	Damla Serim, Eset Akçilad and Berrin Tekdemir	Sinan Öztürk	28 March 2022							
Episode 21	10.. 9.. 8..	Damla Serim, Eset Akçilad and Berrin Tekdemir	Sinan Öztürk	4 April 2022							
Episode 22	We Will Never Be A Couple	Damla Serim, Eset Akçilad and Berrin Tekdemir	Sinan Öztürk	11 April 2022							
Episode 23	To Be A Family	Damla Serim, Eset Akçilad and Berrin Tekdemir	Sinan Öztürk	18 April 2022							
Episode 24	It's Our Turn	Damla Serim, Eset Akçilad and Berrin Tekdemir	Sinan Öztürk	25 April 2022							
Episode 25	Don't Be Afraid	Damla Serim, Eset Akçilad and Berrin Tekdemir	Sinan Öztürk	9 May 2022							
Episode 26	Two Children	Damla Serim, Eset Akçilad and Berrin Tekdemir	Sinan Öztürk	16 May 2022							
Episode 27	Finally	Damla Serim, Eset Akçilad and Berrin Tekdemir	Sinan Öztürk	23 May 2022							
Episode 28	Don't Bow Your Head	Damla Serim, Eset Akçilad and Berrin Tekdemir	Sinan Öztürk	30 May 2022							
