= Pocket Hercules: Naim Suleymanoglu =

- Original film poster
- Directed by: Özer Feyzioğlu
- Written by: Barış Pirhasan
- Produced by: Mustafa Uslu
- Starring: Hayat Van Eck; Yetkin Dikinciler; Selen Öztürk
- Music by: Fahir Atakoğlu
- Distributed by: CGV Mars Dağıtım
- Release date: 22 November 2019
- Country: Turkey
- Language: Turkish

Pocket Hercules: Naim Suleymanoglu is a Turkish biographical drama film directed by Ozer Feyzioglu, written by Barış Pirhasan and produced by Mustafa Uslu. The film depicts the life of Naim Suleymanoglu, nicknamed "Pocket Hercules".

== Filming ==
The film was shot in Turkey, Bulgaria, Melbourne, Brazil, the United Kingdom, United States and Moscow.

== Plot ==
The movie depicts an 11-year period in Suleymanoglu's life, beginning with his first acquaintance with weightlifting in the 1970s at age 10, through until the Seoul Olympics in 1988 where he won a gold medal in his weight class. The film depicts Suleymanoglu achieve his first world record, Olympic titles, European titles and World titles as well as a number of other achievements. He is depicted as the youngest world record holder in weightlifting at the age of 15.

At the same time, the Bulgarian Communist Party (BCP) led by Todor Zhivkov sought to replace the names of Bulgarian Turks, including Suleymanoglu, with Bulgarian names. It carried this out beginning in 1984. The consequences of the assimilation campaign, called the Revival Process by BCP officials, and Naim's attempts to leave Bulgaria and draw international attention to the plight of the Bulgarian Turks is heavily covered by the film.

== Release and reception ==
The film was released on 22 November 2019. The track "Naim", the soundtrack to the film, was composed by rapper Eypio. It was also released on Netflix 10 months after its initial release.

The film holds an average rating of 8.2/10 on IMDb as of 26 February 2026. On the Turkish websites Sinemalar and Beyazperde it holds an 8.4/10 and 9.4/10, respectively.

== Cast ==
- Hayat Van Eck – Naim Süleymanoğlu
- Yetkin Dikinciler – Süleyman Süleymanoğlu
- Selen Öztürk – Hatice Süleymanoğlu
- Gürkan Uygun – Enver Türkileri
- İsmail Hacıoğlu – Mehmet Tunç
- Uğur Güneş – Cemal Tunalı
- Renan Bilek – Remzi
- Barış Kıralioğlu – Turgut Özal
- Bülent Alkış – Atalay Göktuna
- Levent Ülgen – Can Pulak
- Berat Yenilmez – Selim Egeli
