= Defne Kayalar =

Turkish actress (born 1975)

- Born: 7 May 1975 (age 49); Ankara, Turkey
- Education: Bilkent University
- Occupation: Actress
- Years active: 1996–present
- Known for: Ethos
- Spouse: Ali Bilgin (m. 2014)

Defne Kayalar (born 7 May 1975) is a Turkish actress. She is best known to international audiences for her role in the 2020 Netflix series Ethos.

== Life and career ==
Kayalar is a graduate of the Graphics Department of Bilkent University in Ankara. She later worked as an assistant in the Department of Cinema and Television at Istanbul Bilgi University.

In 2003, Kayalar produced the series Alacakaranlık with Uğur Yücel and in 2004, she co-produced the film Toss-Up. In 2013, she was a regular in the series 20 Dakika, and the following year, she had a recurring role in the teen drama Medcezir. The same year, she married Ali Bilgin, the show's director. In 2015, she appeared in the Bilgin-directed film Delibal. In 2020, Kayalar gained prominence with the role of the psychiatrist Peri in the Netflix series Ethos.

== Selected filmography ==
=== Film ===
List of film appearances, with year, title, and role shown
Year	Title	Role	Notes
1999	Mrs. Salkım's Diamonds	Artin's wife	
2004	Yazı Tura		Producer
2015	Delibal	Soloist	
2017	Yol Ayrımı	Defne	
2019	I Am You	Yasmin	

=== Television ===
List of television appearances, with year, title, and role shown
Year	Title	Role	Notes
2003	Alacakaranlık		Producer, screenwriter
2010	Keskin Bıçak	Burcu	
2012	Eve Düşen Yıldırım		
2012	Al Yazmalım	Suna	
2013	20 Dakika	Derin Solmaz	24 episodes
2013–15	Medcezir	Sedef Kaya	59 episodes
2017	Bu Şehir Arkandan Gelecek	Nesrin	
2017	Fi	Aylin	7 episodes
2018	Dip		8 episodes
2018	The Protector	Suzan Bayraktar	2 episodes
2020	Ethos	Peri	8 episodes
2021	Menajerimi Ara	Herself	1 episode
2021	Ayak İşleri	Ece	
2021	Saklı	Beril	
2022	As the Crow Flies	Gül	
