= Taner Ölmez =

Turkish actor and musician (born 1986)

- Born: 9 August 1986 (age 40); Tunceli, Turkey
- Education: Istanbul University State Conservatory - Theatre Department
- Occupations: Actor; musician
- Years active: 2009–present
- Spouse: Ece Çeşmioğlu (m. 2021)
- Children: 2

Taner Ölmez (born 9 August 1986) is a Turkish actor and musician.

== Biography ==
His family is of Zaza Alevi descent from Tunceli. He was the lead singer of a barabar group. His brother Taylan Özgür Ölmez is a musician. He married actress Ece Çeşmioğlu in June 2021, with whom he has two children.

He started his acting career in 2009. His first popular drama was Kayıp Şehir where he acted as Sadık. He gained fame through Medcezir in which he played Mert Asım Serez. With Medcezir's co-star Hazar Ergüçlü, he played in surreal comedy series Dudullu Postası and fantasy series Hakan: Muhafız. He is also known for portraying Ali Vefa in medical series Mucize Doktor. With his wife Ece Çeşmioğlu, he played in Muhteşem Yüzyıl: Kösem and Yüz Yüze. His detective dramas are Alef and Çıplak Gerçek.

== Filmography ==
=== Film ===
Year	Title	Role	Director
2012	Uzun Hikâye	Celal	Osman Sınav
2017	Kırık Kalpler Bankası	Osman	Onur Ünlü
2018	Gerçek Kesit: Manyak	Halıcı Müşterisi	Onur Ünlü
2018	Müslüm	Ahmet Akbaş	Ketche y Can Ulkay
2024	Hayatla Barış	Barış Telli	Ekin Pandir

=== Television ===
Year	Title	Role	Network	Notes
2009	Kül ve Ateş	Hayati	Star TV	
2009–2010	Kapalıçarşı	Gıyabettin	ATV	38 episodes
2010	Aşk ve Ceza	Yavuz Moran as a young man	ATV	1 episode
2011	İstanbul'un Altınları	Mustafa	ATV	13 episodes
2012	Çıplak Gerçek	Deniz	Star TV	1 episode
2012–2013	Kayıp Şehir	Sadık	Kanal D	25 episodes
2013	Tatar Ramazan	Çoban Ahmet	ATV	3 episodes
2013–2015	Medcezir	Mert Asım Serez	Star TV	77 episodes
2016	Muhteşem Yüzyıl Kösem	Osman II	Fox	12 episodes
2017	Yüz Yüze	Aleko	Show TV	2 episodes
2019	Kadın	Ali Vefa	Fox	
2019–2021	Mucize Doktor	Ali Vefa	Fox	64 episodes
2024	Deha	Cesur	Show TV	31 episodes

=== Web TV ===
Year	Title	Rol	Platform	Notes
2018	Dudullu Postası	Tayfur	BluTV	13 episodes
2019	İçten Sesler Korosu	Ayaz	YouTube	1 episode
2020	The Protector (Hakan: Muhafız)	Burak	Netflix	8 episodes
2022	Alef	Çınar Demir	BluTV	8 episodes
2023	Yaratılan	Ziya	Netflix	8 episodes

=== Short films ===
Year	Title	Role
2018	Zor Yol	Autoestopista
2020	25 Litre: Suyun Peşinde	

== Theatre ==
Year	Title	Theatre
2010	Çatı	
2011	Aut	Teatro İkincikat
2014	Katil Joe	Theatre iN
2017	Semaver ve Kumpanya	Theatre Semaver Kumpanya
2023	Nasreddin Hoca	Theatre Semaver Kumpanya

== Commercials ==
Title
Ülker Albeni
Ülker Sunny
Piyale Pigafest
Turkcell
Finalizar
Lysol

== Discography ==
=== Album ===
Year	Title	Notes
2019	Memleket Nere	With the band Barabar

== Awards ==
Year	Award	Category	Work	Result
2014	Theatrical Afife Awards	Most Successful Supporting Actor of the Year	Katil Joe	Won
2014	Sadri Alisik Theatre and Cinema Awards	Best Supporting Actor		Nominated
2019	ELLE Style Awards	Emerging Actor of the Year	Mucize Doktor	Won
2019	Pantene Golden Butterfly Awards	Best actor	Mucize Doktor	Won
2020	Altin 61	Best Actor of the Year	Mucize Doktor	Won
2020	Ayakli Gazete TV Stars Awards	Best Actor in a Television Series	Mucize Doktor	Won
2020	International Izmir Film Festival	Best Actor in a Television Series	Mucize Doktor	Nominated
2020	Golden Palm Awards	Best Actor in a Television Series	Mucize Doktor	Nominated
2020	Pantene Golden Butterfly Awards	Male Television Actor of the Year	Mucize Doktor	Nominated
2020	Dilek Prize of Yeditepe University	Best Actor	Mucize Doktor	Won
2020	PRODU Awards	Best Actor in a Foreign Series	Mucize Doktor	Won
2020	Turkey Youth Awards	Mejor actor de televisión	Mucize Doktor	Nominated
2021	Ayakli Gazete TV Stars Awards	Best Television Actor	Mucize Doktor	Nominated
2021	Kristal Geyik Awards	Best Actor of the Year	Mucize Doktor	Won
2021	Sinemaport Awards	Best New Actor	Mucize Doktor	Won
2021	IEEE METU Social Media Awards	Most Successful Actor of the Year	Mucize Doktor	Won
