= Yüksek Sosyete =

- Written by: Yazı Odası
- Directed by: Metin Balekoğlu
- Starring: Engin Öztürk Hazar Ergüçlü; Meriç Aral Mehmet Ozan Dolunay
- Country of origin: Turkey
- Original language: Turkish
- No. of seasons: 1
- No. of episodes: 26

Production
- Producer: Burak Sağyaşar
- Running time: 115 minutes (average)
- Production company: Bi Yapım

Original release
- Network: Star TV
- Release: June 16 – December 24, 2016

Yüksek Sosyete (English: High Society) is a Turkish television series based on the South Korean drama High Society, it began on 16 June 2016 and ended on 24 December 2016. It is one of the first works of Burak Sağyaşar's Production (Bi Yapım) aired with his second work Aşk Laftan Anlamaz.

== Plot ==
This television show's plot is taken from the 2015 Korean series High Society. It's also about two different worlds. The first world is Kerem's (Engin Öztürk) world. Kerem is a hard-working man, his parents work in a rich family's house. Kerem always helps their grandson and his best friend Mert (Ozan Dolunay) in everything. One day Mert's grandmother wants him to manage Oliva supermarket. Mert can't manage it so he wants Kerem to manage the supermarket for one month and to exchange each other's name(Mert wanted that Kerem's skills in managing Olivia would help him achieve a great name by exchanging each other's identity). The other world is Cansu's (Hazar Ergüçlü). Cansu is the youngest of her family. She's been always hated by her mother and was told that she brings bad luck to her. Cansu enjoys having fun and being normal, not the way her mother want her to live. One day her mother makes a date for Cansu and Mert. But the date fails so she goes to a café and sees a woman that reads the future. The woman told Cansu that she will love a poor man in a workplace. Cansu goes to work in Oliva supermarket and meets her new friend Ece (Meriç Aral) and also meets Kerem.A magical love story will start between Cansu and Kerem and Ece and Mert.Both couples will encounter many difficulties like Mert is Kerem and Kerem is Mert.Cansu doesn't belong to a poor but belongs to a rich family.

== Characters ==
| Actors | Characters | Episodes |
|---|---|---|
| Engin Öztürk | Kerem Özkan | 1 - 26 |
| Hazar Ergüçlü | Cansu Koran | 1 - 26 |
| Meriç Aral | Ece | 1 - 26 |
| Mehmet Ozan Dolunay | Mert Çalhan | 1 - 26 |
| Zuhal Olcay | Süreyya Koran | 1 - 26 |
| Nihat Altinkaya | Levent Karatay | 6 - 26 |
| Hakkı Ergök | Metin Koran | 1 - 26 |
| Aliye Uzunatağan | Bedia | 1 - 26 |
| Taner Barlas | Yılmaz Özkan | 1 - 26 |
| Hülya Gülşen Irmak | Ayşen Özkan | 1 - 26 |
| Ceyda Tepeliler | Işıl | 1 - 26 |
| Gülşah Çomoğlu | Begüm Koran | 1 - 26 |
| Özgün Çoban | Can Koran | 1 - 11 |
| Yasin Çam | Ercan | 1 - 26 |
| Seren Deniz Yalçın | Sude Goksu | 14 - 21 |

== International broadcasting ==
| Country | Network | Local title | Series premiere | Series finale | Timeslot |
|---|---|---|---|---|---|
| Turkey | Star TV | Yuksek Sosyete | June 16, 2016 | December 24, 2016 | Thursdays at 20:00 |
| Albania | Vizion Plus | Shoqeri e larte | March 13, 2017 | 2017 | Monday to Friday at 17:00 |
| Iran | GEM TV | Gheshr Morrafah | March 13, 2017 | 2017 | Monday to Friday at 17:00 |
| Romania | Happy Channel | Elita societății | June 20, 2017 | August 10, 2017 | Monday to Friday at 20:00 |
| Bulgaria | bTV/bTV Lady | Висше общество | June 25, 2018 | August 27, 2018 | Monday to Friday at 13:30/23:00 |
| Pakistan | LTN Family | Armaan | 1 April 2019 | | Wednesday to Thursday |
