= Paper Lives (film) =

2021 drama film

- Turkish: Kağıttan Hayatlar
- Directed by: Can Ulkay
- Written by: Ercan Mehmet Erdem
- Produced by: Onur Güvenatam
- Starring: Çağatay Ulusoy; Emir Ali Doğrul; Ersin Arıcı; Turgay Tanülkü; Selen Öztürk
- Cinematography: Serkan Güler
- Production company: OGM Pictures
- Distributed by: Netflix
- Release date: March 12, 2021
- Country: Turkey
- Language: Turkish

Paper Lives (Turkish: Kağıttan Hayatlar) is a 2021 Turkish drama film directed by Can Ulkay and written by Ercan Mehmet Erdem. The film stars Çağatay Ulusoy, Emir Ali Doğrul, Ersin Arıcı, Turgay Tanülkü and Selen Öztürk. It premiered on Netflix on March 12, 2021.

== Plot ==
In an impoverished neighborhood of Istanbul, a friendly garbage collector, Mehmet, who after becoming homeless has a soft spot for the many homeless children in the area, discovers an eight-year-old boy hiding in his colleague's garbage bag. Mehmet is dedicated to reconnecting the boy with his family.

== Cast ==
- Çağatay Ulusoy as Mehmet
- Emir Ali Doğrul as Ali
- Ersin Arıcı as Gonzales
- Turgay Tanülkü as Tahsin
- Selen Öztürk

== Critical response ==
According John Serba from Decider, the film "starts strong, holds on pretty well, then blows it hard at the end".
