= Bertan Asllani =

Macedonian-Albanian actor, singer and composer (born 1990)

- Born: 3 July 1990 (age 36); Skopje, Republic of North Macedonia
- Occupations: Actor; Singer; Composer
- Years active: 2003–present

Bertan Asllani (born 3 July 1990) is a Macedonian-Albanian actor, singer and composer, best known for roles in Turkish television series such as Yabani and Pis Yedili.

== Early life ==
Asllani was born on 3 July 1990 in Skopje, Republic of North Macedonia, into an Albanian family. He was raised in Skopje and learned Turkish during his childhood.

== Music career ==
Asllani began his music career at a young age and released his first album in 2003 at the age of 13.

He participated in Top Fest 2 (2005) with the song Akoma të du.

He later continued his career in Turkey as a performer and composer. He has composed songs for Turkish artists including Murat Dalkılıç, Demet Akalın and Gülben Ergen.

== Acting career ==
Asllani began acting in Turkey with a role in the television series Pis Yedili (2013).

He later appeared in several Turkish television series, including Göç Zamanı (2016), Kimse Bilmez (2019), Evlilik Hakkında Her Şey (2021) and Gecenin Ucunda (2022).

He later transitioned from music to acting and appeared in Turkish television series and films.

In 2023, he appeared in the series Yabani.

== Awards ==
Asllani has received awards for his work in Turkish television, including a Best TV Couple award for Yabani alongside Rojbin Erden.

== Filmography ==
=== Television ===
Year	Title	Notes
2013	Pis Yedili	TV series
2016	Göç Zamanı	TV series
2019	Kimse Bilmez	TV series
2021	Evlilik Hakkında Her Şey	TV series
2022	Gecenin Ucunda	TV series
2023-2025	Yabani	TV series
2024-2025	Atatürk	Film
2026	Mercan Kösk	TV series
