= Big Man, Little Love =

2001 film by Handan İpekçi

- Directed by: Handan İpekçi
- Written by: Handan İpekçi
- Produced by: Handan İpekçi; Nikos Kanakis; Dénes Szekeres
- Starring: Şükran Güngör; Dilan Erçetin; Füsun Demirel; Yıldız Kenter; İsmail Hakkı Şen; Sevinc Erol
- Cinematography: Erdal Kahraman
- Edited by: Nikos Kanakis
- Music by: Mazlum Çimen; Serdar Yalçın
- Release date: October 19, 2001
- Running time: 120 minutes
- Countries: Turkey; Hungary; Greece
- Languages: Turkish, Kurdish

Big Man, Little Love (Turkish: Büyük Adam Küçük Aşk, Kurdish: Hêjar) is a 2001 international co-production drama film, written and directed by Handan İpekçi, about an orphaned Kurdish child and a Turkish pensioner thrown together by circumstance. The film, which went on nationwide general release across Turkey on October 19, 2001, won awards at film festivals in Antalya, Cairo, Cologne and Istanbul, including the Golden Orange for Best Film, and was Turkey's submission to the 74th Academy Awards for the Academy Award for Best Foreign Language Film, but was not accepted as a nominee.

== Plot ==
An orphaned Kurdish child (Hêjar) and a Turkish pensioner (Rıfat) are thrown together by circumstance. Rıfat, a widowed retired judge, refuses to get involved in politics. He is forced out of his solitude, when Hêjar the only survivor of a police raid on his Kurdish neighbors, takes refuge at his home. Gradually, he warms up to the kid and decides to reunite her with her family.

== Cast ==
- Şükran Güngör as Rıfat Bey
- Dilan Erçetin as Hêjar
- Füsun Demirel as Sakine (Rojbin)
- Yıldız Kenter as Müzeyyen Hanım
- İsmail Hakkı Şen as Evdo Emmi

== Awards ==
1. Golden Orange & Special Jury Awards (Best Film, Best Screenplay, Best Supporting Actor & Actress), Antalya Golden Orange Film Festival, 2001.
2. Silver Pyramid Award, Cairo International Film Festival, 2002.
3. Best Screenplay Award, Cologne Mediterranean Film Festival, 2002.
4. People's Choice Award, Istanbul International Film Festival, 2003.

== See also ==
- List of submissions to the 75th Academy Awards for Best Foreign Language Film
- List of Turkish submissions for the Academy Award for Best Foreign Language Film
