= Mina Demirtaş =

Turkish actress

- Born: 19 February 2008 (age 18); Ankara, Turkey
- Occupation: Actress
- Years active: 2021–present
- Awards: Full list

Mina Demirtaş (born 19 February, 2008) is a Turkish actress. She rose to prominence by portraying the character of Zeynep Tezel in the TV series Red Roses (Turkish title: Kızıl Goncalar).

== Life and career ==
Demirtaş was born on 19 February 2008 in Ankara.

She made her acting debut in 2021 with the movie Âkif. For her performance as Reyhan in the 2022 movie Kabahat she was honored with the Türkan Şoray Promising Young Actress Award at the Adana Golden Boll Film Festival. In 2023, she won the Ekrem Bora Best Breakthrough Actor of the Year Award at the 26th Sadri Alışık Theatre and Cinema Actor Awards for her role as Azra in the movie Beraber.

Between 2023 and 2025, she starred in the TV series Kızıl Goncalar as Zeynep Tezel, which made her a household name in Turkey.

== Filmography ==
Cinema
| Year | Title | Role | Notes | Director |
|---|---|---|---|---|
| 2021 | Âkif | Suad Ersoy | Supporting role | Sadullah Şentürk |
| 2022 | Kabahat | Reyhan | Leading role | Ümran Safter |
| 2023 | Beraber | Azra | Supporting role | Mete Gümürhan |
Television
| Year | Title | Role | Notes | Network |
| 2023–2025 | Kızıl Goncalar | Zeynep Tezel | Leading role | NOW |
| 2026 | Delikanlı | Dila Kızılhan | Leading role | Show TV |
| Soon | Yörük Kızı | Güneş | Leading role | TRT 1 |
Streaming movies and series
| Year | Title | Role | Notes | Platform |
| 2026 | Yaz Evi | Selin | Leading role | Amazon Prime |

=== Commercials ===
- Schwarzkopf Gliss

== Awards and nominations ==
| Year | Award | Category | Work | Result |
|---|---|---|---|---|
| 2022 | 29th Adana Golden Boll Film Festival | Türkan Şoray Promising Young Actress Award | Kabahat | Won |
| 2023 | 23rd International Frankfurt Turk Film Festival | Promising Actor Award | Kabahat | Won |
| 2024 | Filmsan Film and Television Series Awards | Promising Actress | Kızıl Goncalar | Won |
| 2024 | 24th Magazinci Best of the Year | Promising Actor | Kızıl Goncalar | Won |
| 2024 | 50th Golden Butterfly Awards | Best TV Series Couple _{with Mert Yazıcıoğlu} | Kızıl Goncalar | Nominated |
| 2024 | 10th Altın 61 Awards | Shining Actress of the Year | Kızıl Goncalar | Won |
| 2025 | 28th Flying Broom International Women's Film Festival | Young Witch Award | | Won |
| 2025 | 26th Sadri Alışık Theatre and Cinema Actor Awards | Ekrem Bora Best Breakthrough Actor of the Year Award. | Beraber | Won |
