= Last Summer (2021 film) =

2021 film

- Turkish: Geçen Yaz
- Directed by: Ozan Açıktan
- Written by: Ozan Açıktan; Sami Berat Marçali
- Starring: Ece Çeşmioğlu; Aslıhan Malbora; Halit Özgür Sarı
- Production companies: OG Medya; OGM Pictures; PToT Films
- Distributed by: Netflix
- Release date: 9 July 2021
- Running time: 101 minutes
- Country: Turkey
- Language: Turkish

Last Summer (Turkish: Geçen Yaz) is a 2021 Turkish romantic drama film directed by Ozan Açıktan, written by Ozan Açıktan and Sami Berat Marçali and starring Ece Çeşmioğlu, Aslıhan Malbora and Halit Özgür Sarı.

== Cast ==
- Fatih Berk Şahin
- Ece Çeşmioğlu
- Aslıhan Malbora
- Halit Özgür Sarı
- Eren Ören
- Ozan Kaya Oktu
- Talha Öztürk
- Sümeyye Aydoğan
- Merve Nur Bengi
- Kubilay Tunçer
- Süreyya Güzel
- Eray Ertüren
