= Darmaduman =

- Genre: Youth; Drama
- Written by: Damla Sirem; Berrin Tekdemir
- Directed by: Deniz Yorulmazer
- Starring: Mert Yazıcıoğlu; Aslıhan Malbora; Hafsanur Sancaktutan; Aytaç Şaşmaz; Necip Memili; Nur Fettahoğlu; Ali Önsöz
- Country of origin: Turkey
- Original language: Turkish
- No. of seasons: 1
- No. of episodes: 9

Production
- Producer: Kerem Çatay
- Production location: Istanbul
- Running time: 130 minutes

Original release
- Network: FOX
- Release: 27 October – 24 December 2022

Darmaduman (transl. "Shattered") is a Turkish youth and drama television series directed by Deniz Yorulmazer and written by Damla Sirem and produced by Kerem Çatay. The series is the adaptation of American series Beverly Hills, 90210. The show starred Mert Yazıcıoğlu, Aslıhan Malbora, Hafsanur Sancaktutan and Aytaç Şaşmaz as leading roles.

== Plot ==
The Servet family moves from Eskişehir to Istanbul for family reasons and find themselves in a totally different environment. As the twins Kerem (Mert Yazıcıoğlu) and Ece (Aslıhan Malbora) try to blend in with the environment in the private college they just started, they will meet completely different people. While taking the path towards adulthood step-by-step suffering from growing pains, they will go on a long journey called youth where they will discover themselves while being scattered with mistakes and the excitements of first love.

== Cast and characters ==
Actor	Character	Episodes
Mert Yazıcıoğlu	Kerem Servet	1–9
Hafsanur Sancaktutan	Derin	1–9
Aslıhan Malbora	Ece Servet	1–9
Aytaç Şaşmaz	Evren	1–9
Nur Fettahoğlu	Beliz Servet	1–9
Necip Memili	Harun Servet	1–9
Meral Çetinkaya	Ayla Servet	1–9
Metin Coşkun	Asaf Servet	1–9
Ali Önsöz	Yağız	1–9
Beste Can Sağlam	Simla	1–9
Umut Kaya	Görkem	1–9
Barış Başar	Tamer	1–9
Cem Karakaya	Raşit	1–9
Murat Kapu	Yiğit	1–9
Aslı Orcan	Sedef	2–9
Yüksel Ünal	Ruhi	2–9
Dilşad Şimşek	Sevgi	4–8
Mehmet Bilge Aslan	İbrahim	7–9

== Episodes ==
Seasons	Episodes	Start date	End date
1	1–9	27 October 2022	24 December 2022
