= Yabani =

Turkish romantic drama television series

- Genre: Drama
- Screenplay by: Onur Şener; Lokman Maral; Seçi̇l Çömlekçi̇
- Story by: Hilal Yıldız
- Directed by: M. Çağatay Tosun and Filiz Adıgüzel
- Starring: Halit Özgür Sarı; Simay Barlas; Dolunay Soysert; Tayanç Ayaydın; Şebnem Hassanisoughi; Rojbin Erden
- Theme music composer: Ender Gündüzlü; Metin Arıgül; Can Sanıbelli
- Country of origin: Turkey
- Original language: Turkish
- No. of seasons: 2
- No. of episodes: 51

Production
- Executive producers: Mehmet Yiğit Alp; Fatih Aksoy
- Producers: Fatih Aksoy; Mehmet Yiğit Alp
- Production location: Istanbul
- Cinematography: Özkan Bal
- Camera setup: Single-camera
- Running time: 110 - 170 minutes
- Production company: NTC Medya

Original release
- Network: Fox / Now
- Release: September 12, 2023 – January 11, 2025

Yabani (English: Wild Heart) is a Turkish television drama series that is being produced by NTC Medya and directed by Çağatay Tosun. The series was created by Hilal Yıldız. The production company behind the show is NTC MEDYA, with producers Fatih Aksoy and Mehmet Yiğit Alp. The show premiered on Tuesday, September 12, 2023. The leading roles of the series feature Halit Özgür Sarı, Dolunay Soysert, Tayanç Ayaydın, Simay Barlas and Şebnem Hassanisoughi. In January 2024, the series was said to be "one of the most successful (Turkish) productions of th(e) season."

== Plot twist ==
The show's plot revolves around the story of a child who was kidnapped from a wealthy family and subsequently found himself abandoned on the streets. After years of navigating the challenges of life in an unfamiliar environment, he eventually manages to return to his original home. The series delves into his struggle to reinvent himself and reintegrate into the family and society he was once a part of, all while coming to terms with the profound changes that have occurred during his absence.

== Cast and characters ==
Actor/actress	Role	Description
Halit Özgür Sarı	Yaman Ali Soysalan	Neslihan's son who was kidnapped at a young age. Rüya’s boyfriend
Dolunay Soysert	Neslihan Soysalan	Eşref's daughter, a doctor at Soysalan Hospital.
Tayanç Ayaydın	Güven Aydın	Brain, Nerve and Spinal Cord Surgery Specialist. Yaman's father, Neslihan's true love.
Simay Barlas	Rüya Arkan	Daughter of Şebnem and Metin. Yaman’s girlfriend.
Osman Alkaş	Eşref Ali Soysalan	Founder of Soysalan Hospital, Neslihan's father.
Şebnem Hassanisoughi	Şebnem Sualp	Rüya's mother, finance manager at Soysalan Hospital.
Yurdaer Okur	Serhan Soysalan	Neslihan's ex-husband is the director of Soysalan Hospital.
Bertan Asllani	Alaz Soysalan	Neslihan and Serhan's son. Asi’s boyfriend.
Rojbin Erden	Büşra-Asi Altun	One of Yaman's closest friends
Seray Özkan	Çağla Soysalan	Alaz's twin sister Neslihan and Serhan's daughter. Çesur’s girlfriend
Sezer Arıçay	Cesur	Yaman's closest friends whom he sees as his brother. Çağla's boyfriend
Aleyna Al	Ece Soysalan	Sister of Alaz and Çağla, youngest child of Neslihan and Serhan.
Ramiz Mullamusa	Umut	Yaman's closest friends whom he sees as his brothers. Ece's crush.
Selim Can Yalçın	İlker Sualp	Şebnem's brother, Rüya's uncle.
Bartu Dilmen	Rüzgar Sezer	Alaz's ex-best friend, Çağla's ex-boyfriend.
Aşkın Şenol	Salim	He is a resident of the neighborhood where Yaman lives.
Ayşegül Ünsal	Feride	Helpers of the Soysalan family.
Güray Görkem	Osman	Helpers of the Soysalan family.
Birgül Ulusoy	Yurdagül	Helpers of the Soysalan family.
Nur Fettahoğlu	Özge Aydın	Psychiatrist and Güven Aydın's wife

== Overview ==
Season	Episodes	Start Date	End Date	Network
1	36	12 September 2023	1 June 2024	Fox
2	15	14 September 2024	11 January 2025	Now

== Production ==
Yabani is filmed in Istanbul, and in particular in the Beşiktaş and Galata districts.

A second season was approved in May 2024.

== Reception ==
After a very strong start, audiences for the series have fallen.

== See also ==
- Television in Turkey
- List of Turkish television series
- Turkish television drama
