= Kübra (TV series) =

- Genre: Drama; Thriller
- Based on: Kübra by Afşin Kum
- Screenplay by: Rana Mamatlıoğlu, Bekir Baran Sıtkı, Murat Uyurkulak
- Starring: Çağatay Ulusoy; Aslıhan Malbora; Ahsen Eroğlu
- Theme music composer: Hedonutopia
- Country of origin: Türkiye
- Original language: Turkish
- No. of seasons: 2
- No. of episodes: 16

Production
- Camera setup: Single-camera
- Running time: 45 minutes
- Production company: OGM Pictures

Original release
- Network: Netflix
- Release: 18 January 2024 – present

Related
- Hot Skull

Kübra is a Turkish drama and thriller television series directed by Durul and Yağmur Taylan, the first episode of which was released on 18 January 2024 on Netflix. It is an adaptation of the book with the same name by Afşin Kum, also the second Netflix series adapted from a book by Afşin Kum (first adaptation was Hot Skull (2022)).

== Plot ==
Gökhan is an ordinary young man living in Istanbul. His normal life with dreams of marrying the love of his life, Merve, ends with the message "You are different!" from an account named "Kübra" on a religious texting application called SoulTouch. Gökhan, who does not care about the message at first, discovers Kübra is God himself. Kübra gives Gökhan information that warns him about events unknown to anyone. Gökhan embarks on a difficult journey when he accepts this truth. On this difficult journey with his supporters, he encounters various enemies.

== Cast ==
- Çağatay Ulusoy - Gökhan Şahinoğlu
- Aslıhan Malbora - Merve
- Ahsen Eroğlu - Gülcan
- Nazan Kesal - Dilek
- Cihan Talay - Salih
- Aytek Şayan - Serhat
- Ahmet Mümtaz Taylan - Kara
- Sibel Seyhan Bayhan - Nalan
- Cemalettin Çekmece - Ali Rıza
- Erdem Şenocak - İmam
- Murat Garipağaoğlu - Turgut
- Onur Ünsal - Berk
- Çağrı Çıtanak - Selim
- Murat Kılıç - Muzaffer
- Deniz Işın
- Binnur Kaya
- Ferit Kaya - Ali Cemal
- Pınar Töre - Tuğçe
- Nişan Şirinyan - Hamit
- Bülent Düzgünoğlu - Haluk
- Nizam Namidar - Nihat
- Necat Bayar - Muammer

== Production ==
The series was launched on Netflix in January 2024 and has two seasons.

== Reception ==
A review of the first season praised the way the series approached the topics of faith and technology. Various reviews found the series thrilling and praised the acting. A review of season 2, however, stated, "Without the potential mysticism that propped up Season 1 – the reveal didn’t come until very close to the end – it’s undeniable that Kubra Season 2 has lost an essential quality. But it retains a provocative thematic throughline, and the performers rise to the challenge of selling the dilemma Gokhan finds himself in." Movies.net was much more critical and found the season 2 "worse" than the first.
