= Handan İpekçi =

Turkish screenwriter and film director (born 1956)

Handan İpekçi (born 1956 in Ankara, Turkey) is a Turkish screenwriter and film director.

== Education ==
Handan İpekçi studied Radio and Television Studies at Gazi University, Faculty of Communication in Ankara. The controversial feature Hejar which she wrote, produced and directed was Turkey's official submission for the 74th Academy Award for Best Foreign Language Film.

== Filmography ==
Year	Film	Role	Notes
1989	Ayaşlı ve Kiracıları	Co-director with Tunca Yönder	TV series
1993	Kemençenin Türküsü	Director	Documentary
1994	Dad is in the Army a.k.a. Babam Askerde	Director	First feature film, denied distribution
2001	Hejar a.k.a. Büyük Adam Küçük Aşk	Director, Producer, Writer	
2007	Hidden Faces a.k.a. Saklı Yüzler	Director, Producer, Writer, Editor	

== Awards ==
İpekçi received local and international awards. Dad is in the Army brought her most promising director and screenwriter awards among others at Turkish film festivals, Hejar won nine awards including Golden Orange for Best Film and Best Screenplay at Antalya Film Festival and Silver Pyramid at Cairo Film Festival.
