= Necip Memili =

Turkish actor

- Born: 27 May 1980 (age 46); Adana, Turkey
- Occupation: Actor
- Years active: 2005–present
- Spouse: Didem Dayıcıoğlu (m. 2020)
- Children: 1 daughter

Necip Memili (born 27 May 1980) is a Turkish actor. He is a graduate of Çukurova University State Conservatory with a degree in theatre studies.

In 1999, he started working as an amateur actor for Adana Seyhan Municipal Theatre. After graduating, he moved to Istanbul. There he joined the cast of Uçurtmanın Kuyruğu, a play written by Savaş Dinçel and directed by Erdal Cindoruk.

His television debut came with a role in the series Beşinci Boyut. He played in adaptations of Turkish classic novels Hanımın Çiftliği and Yaprak Dökümü. He portrayed as Evliya Çelebi in Muhteşem Yüzyıl: Kösem. He was cast in numerous popular series and films.

His performance in Şahsiyet was praised by critics. In 2018, he joined the cast of Show TV's Çukur, portraying the character of Cumali.

== Filmography ==
Film
| Year | Title | Role |
|---|---|---|
| 2010 | Kukuriku - Kadın Krallığı | Çağatay |
| 2010 | Nene Hatun | Mızra |
| 2011 | Ay Büyürken Uyuyamam | Fırıldak Necmi |
| 2011 | Sümela'nın Şifresi: Temel | Ali Kemal Sözer |
| 2011 | Lüks Otel | Polat |
| 2013 | Moskova'nın Şifresi: Temel | Ali Kemal Sözer |
| 2013 | Halam Geldi | Haluk |
| 2014 | Sürgün İnek | İmam Ahmet |
| 2015 | Guruldayan Kalpler | Yaşar |
| 2015 | Yok Artık! | Ahmet |
| 2016 | Kaçma Birader | Kadir |
| 2017 | Dede Korkut Hikayeleri: Deli Dumrul | Kadir |
| 2019 | Karakomik Filmler Kaçamak | Neco |
| 2020 | Şeytan İcadı | Nihat |
| 2021 | Kimya | Kinyaz |
| 2021 | Sen Ben Lenin | Coffeehouse owner |
| 2023 | Prestij Meselesi | |
| 2023 | Annesinin Kuzusu | |
| 2023 | Son Akşam Yemeği | Mahmut |
| 2023 | Arap Kadri ve Tarzan | Tarzan |
| 2024 | Başkan | Zeynel Korkmaz |
Streaming series and films
| Year | Title | Role |
| 2018 | Şahsiyet | Tolga Yazgan |
| 2022 | Erşan Kuneri | Amin Faryadi / Tilki Selim |
| 2023 | Aaahh Belinda | Necati |
TV series
| Year | Title | Role |
| 2005 | Beşinci Boyut | Ali |
| 2006 | Selena | Deli |
| 2007 | Arka Sokaklar | Nevzat |
| 2007 | Hakkını Helal Et | Mahkûm |
| 2007 | Bez Bebek | Selman |
| 2007 | Pusat | Taksici |
| 2007–2008 | Yaprak Dökümü | Erkan Taşkın (Katır) |
| 2008 | Köprü | Şevki |
| 2008 | Gece Gündüz | Nuri |
| 2009 | Aynadaki Düşman | Canlı bombacı |
| 2009–2011 | Hanımın Çiftliği | Zaloğlu Ramazan |
| 2011–2012 | Firar | Fikret |
| 2012 | Yalan Dünya | Cumali |
| 2012–2014 | Dila Hanım | Azer Barazoğlu |
| 2014 | Ulan İstanbul | Doğan Demirci |
| 2015 | Bedel | Vedat Seyhanlı |
| 2016 | Kehribar | Musa Bozoğlu |
| 2016–2017 | Muhteşem Yüzyıl: Kösem | Evliya Çelebi |
| 2017 | Dolunay | Hakan Önder |
| 2018–2021 | Çukur | Cumali Koçovalı |
| 2021–2022 | Kanunsuz Topraklar | Ali Gelik |
| 2022 | Üç Kuruş | Kılıç Hicaz |
| 2022 | Darmaduman | Harun Servet |
| 2023 | Yüz Yıllık Mucize | Turgut |
| 2023–2025 | Sandık Kokusu | Reha Özkan |
| 2025– | Eşref Rüya | Gürdal Bozok |
