= Gülfem Hatun =

Hostess of Suleiman the Magnificent's harem

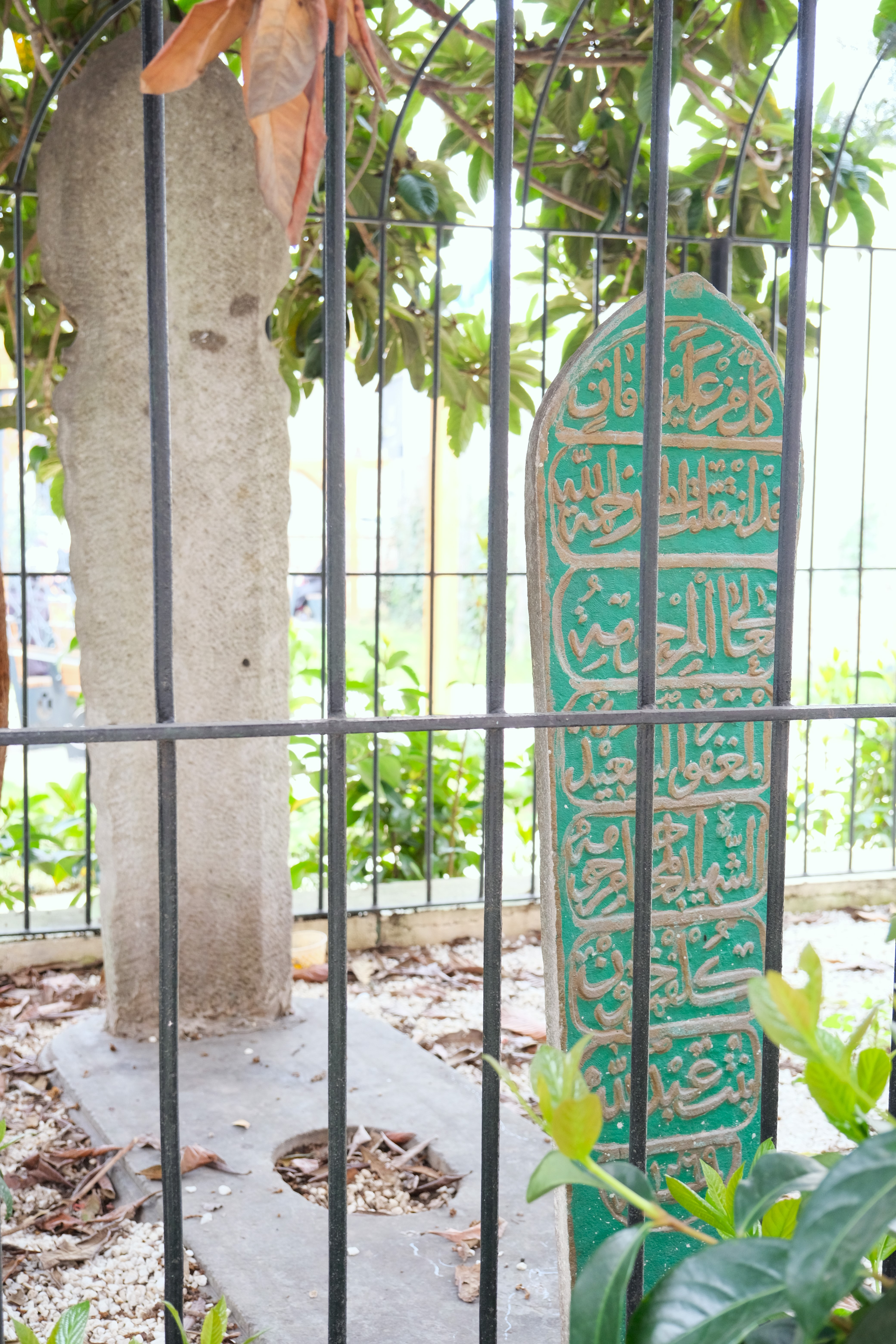
- Grave of Gülfem Hatun in Üsküdar, Istanbul
- Born: 1497
- Died: October/November 1561; Constantinople, Ottoman Empire (present day Istanbul, Turkey)
- Burial: Gülfem Hatun Mosque, Istanbul
- Religion: Sunni Islam

Gülfem Hatun (Ottoman Turkish: کلفم خاتون; 1497 – October/November 1561) was a lady-in-waiting in the harem of Ottoman sultan Suleiman the Magnificent (reign 1520–1566).

== Biography ==
Gülfem is listed as a member of Suleiman's princely staff of Manisa, where she does not appear as a slave concubine member and since she appears in her own name, she was the stewardess of the harem or some other high-ranking administrative official instead. After Suleiman's accession to the throne in 1520, she came to reside in the Old Palace in Constantinople along with others of his princely entourage.

Earlier it was presumed without any evidence that she was allegedly the mother of Mahmud or Murad, however if she had been, she would have been referred to as such i.e., as “mother of the deceased Sultan X" or "valide-i merhum Sultan X" in official documents but in the 1552 harem register Gülfem is simply listed as “Gülfem Khatun.” Besides, she is also referred to as “Gülfem Khatun bint Abdullah” on her tombstone (thus affirming her status as a slave convert), and as “Gülfem Khatun” in an account register of the endowment she established for her Üsküdar mosque.

Throughout Suleiman's reign, she enjoyed a considerable status within the imperial harem, and received a high stipend of 150 aspers a day according to the 1552 register. The special title of the group to which Gülfem belonged was Dar üs-Saade. She was Hürrem Sultan's closest companion, and often made appearances as sending greetings to Suleiman in Hürrem's letters.

Gulfem was clearly helpful and supportive of a young Hürrem and it appears that Suleiman entrusted his beloved favourite to Gülfem when he would be away during his several imperial military expeditions. In a letter dating to 1526, Gülfem had appended a note explaining to the Sultan how she had solved a budget problem for his favorite. Suleiman apparently had some concern about Hürrem’s ability to manage the finances of her growing household especially since they already had four children by 1526. Gülfem recounted that when she had approached Hürrem directly for an account of her monies— keeping her vow to the sultan— she was met with silence. She then consulted a certain Enver (possibly an Old Palace eunuch) and learned that the concubine had “five hundred gold pieces remaining,” presumably from the funds Suleiman had allocated to her before setting off for Hungary. Gülfem also wanted him to be aware that Hürrem knew nothing of her conversation with Enver.

Furthermore, the letter began with a humorous anecdote. Suleiman had sent —among many souvenir gifts from the road— 60 florins and a box of sweets containing a mild intoxicant (kolonya) to Hürrem and Gülfem. Gülfem (or Hürrem) unintentionally consumed the entire box and became lethargic. Despite efforts to revive her, she slept throughout most of the day. Playfully teasing Suleiman for turning her into a laughing stock, she mentions they will discuss more upon his return.

“I drank the cologne right away, you should have seen the state I was in! There were guests, I have no idea what I said, I dozed off for the whole long day… You made a complete buffoon out of me! God-willing, when we see each other again, we can talk about it.”

In 1559, a rebellion against Suleiman was led by Şehzade Bayezid, his son with Hürrem. Gülfem became involved by sending a letter to Bayezid, advising the rebellious prince to comply with his father's wishes.

== Charities ==
In September 1542, she commissioned a soup kitchen in Üsküdar. In March 1543 she established the financial ground work to build a "timber frame mosque" now known as the "Gülfem Hatun Mosque", located near the soup kitchen. According to a local tradition, the mosque was intended for the use of women and opened to men only in recent times. The complex also consisted of a maktab, a madrasa and a caravanserai. Only the mosque has survived to the present day.

== Death ==
She died in October–November 1561, and was buried in the courtyard of her own mosque.

== In popular culture ==
- In the 2003 Turkish TV miniseries, Hürrem Sultan, Gülfem Hatun was played by Turkish actress Yasemin Kozanoğlu.
- In the 2011–2014 Turkish historical fiction TV series Muhteşem Yüzyıl, Gülfem was portrayed by Turkish actress Selen Özturk.

== Bibliography ==
- Brummett, Palmira (Spring 1997). "New Woman and Old Nag: Images of Women in the Ottoman. Cartoon Space". Princeton Papers: Interdisciplinary Journal of Middle Eastern Studies. VI. Markus Wiener Publishers.
- Haskan, Mehmed Nermi (2001). Yüzyıllar Boyunca Üsküdar, Volume 2. Üsküdar Belediyesi. ISBN 978-9-759-76063-2.
- Ostovich, Helen; Silcox, Mary V.; Roebuck, Graham (2008). The Mysterious and the Foreign in Early Modern England. Associated University Presse. ISBN 978-0-874-13954-9.
- Peirce, Leslie P. (1993). The Imperial Harem: Women and Sovereignty in the Ottoman Empire. Oxford University Press. ISBN 978-0-195-08677-5.
- Peirce, Leslie P. (2017). Empress of the East: How a European Slave Girl became Queen of the Ottoman Empire. Basic Books, New York. ISBN 978-0-465-03251-8.
- Ruggles, D. Fairchild (August 3, 2000). Women, Patronage, and Self-Representation in Islamic Societies. SUNY Press. ISBN 978-0-791-44470-2.
- Şahin, K. (2023). Peerless Among Princes: The Life and Times of Sultan Süleyman. Oxford University Press. ISBN 978-0-19-753163-1.
