= Çağatay Ulusoy =

Turkish actor (born 1990)

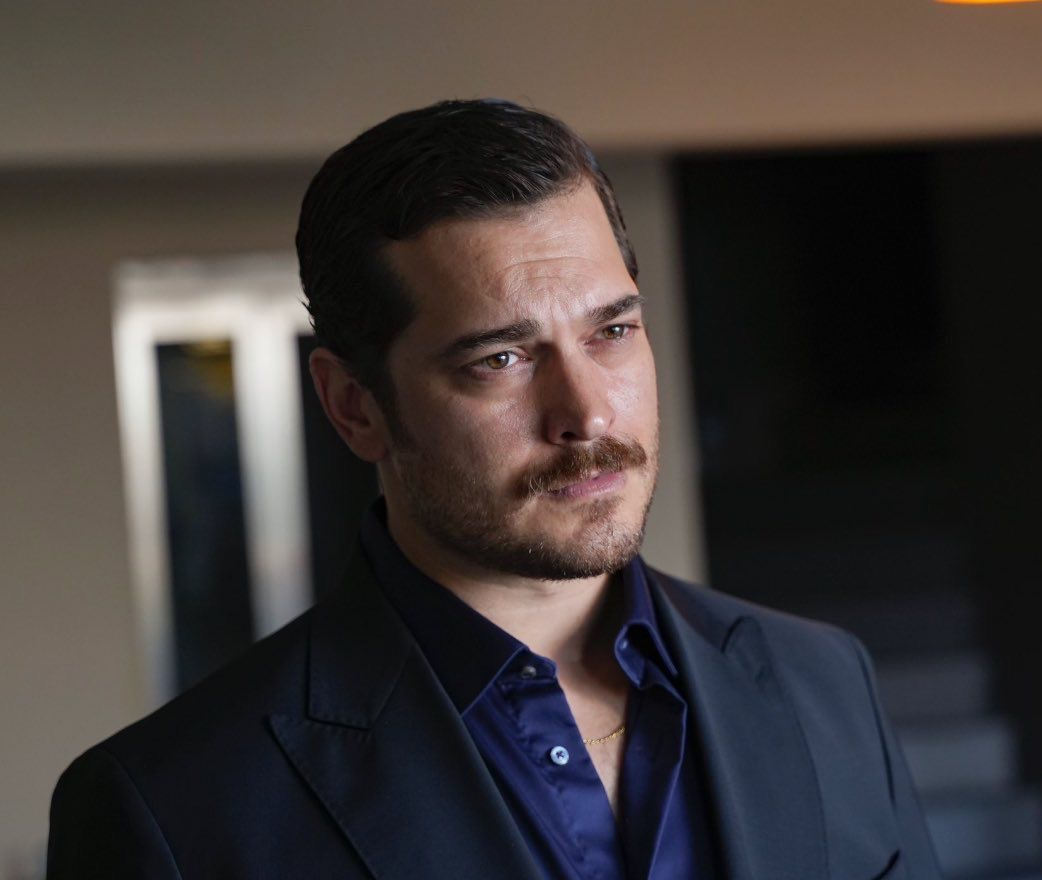
- Ulusoy in 2025 as Eşref Tek
- Born: 23 September 1990 (age 36); Istanbul, Turkey
- Citizenship: Turkish, Bulgarian
- Occupations: Actor, model
- Years active: 2009–present
- Awards: Best Model of Turkey (2010)
- Website: cagatayulusoy.com.tr

Çağatay Ulusoy (pronounced [tʃaːˈtaj uˈɫusoj]; born 23 September 1990) is a Turkish actor who started his career in the TV series Adını Feriha Koydum (2011–2012) as Emir Sarrafoğlu. Since then, he has had further lead roles in Medcezir (2013–2015), a remake of the television series The O.C., in the TV series İçerde and from 2018 to 2020 he played the lead role in the first Turkish Netflix series The Protector.

Ulusoy has been a recipient of several awards, including a Golden Butterfly Award.

== Life and career ==
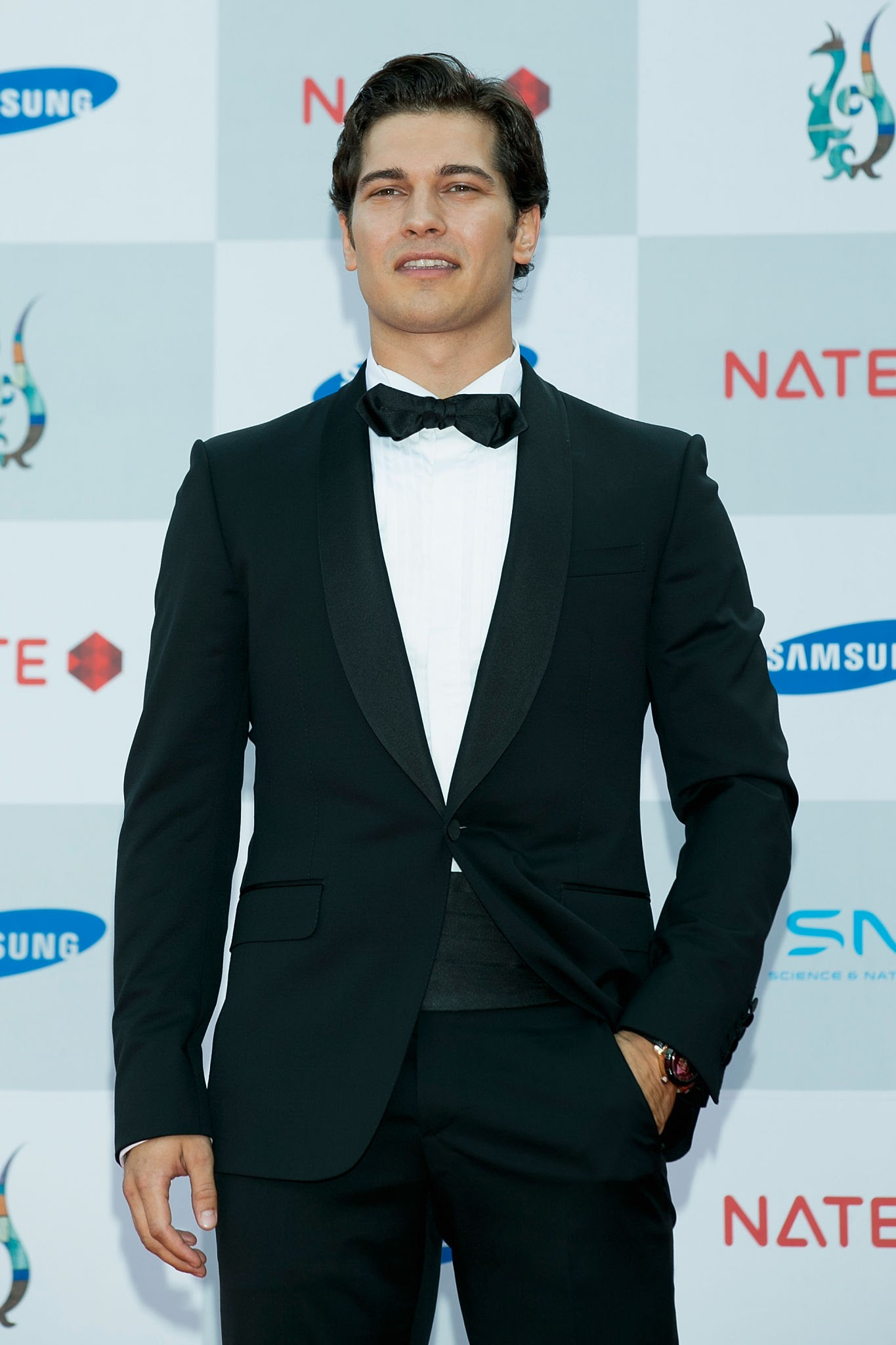
Ulusoy in 2015

Ulusoy was born in Istanbul. His paternal family is of Turkish descent that immigrated from Bulgaria to Turkey, his father immigrated when he was 10 years old. He has a younger brother named Atalay. His mother is of Bosniak descent, an immigrant from Bosnia-Herzegovina. After graduating from high school, Ulusoy first started studying at the Istanbul University's Department of Garden Design and Landscaping. Cagatay Ulusoy was a hyperactive kid. His parents put him in sports at an early age to utilise his energy to maximum. He dreamt of being a basketball player for nine years. He was also good at swimming and diving. As a student, he then started to work as a model at the age of 19. In 2010, he won a modelling contest in Turkey and was named Best Model of Turkey. On the same night that he was named Best Model of the Year, he received his first acting job offer for the TV series Adini Feriha Koydum. In 2011 he shot his first movie Anadolu Kartallari, in a supporting role. Earlier in the same year, Ulusoy starred in the TV series Adını Feriha Koydum as the lead playing Emir Sarrafoğlu. While the first two seasons of the series were successful, the third season that aired under another title Emir'in Yolu (Emir's way), was less successful and due to low ratings, it was cancelled after a few episodes in 2012. This was mainly due to the fact that Ulusoy's co-star Hazal Kaya was not in the third season.Adını Feriha Koydum was later sold and aired in various countries such as Ukraine, Pakistan, Iran, Serbia, Peru, India.

On 25 January 2013, 30 Turkish actors, including Çağatay Ulusoy, were taken into custody for a drugs probe by Istanbul's narcotics police. However, in 2018, upon the request of some of the defendant's lawyers, the decision was examined by the 18th High Criminal Court. The court decided to repeal the verdict established for the crime of drug trafficking.

In 2012, Ulusoy shot a short film, Paranoia. From 2013 until 2015, he played the lead role Yaman Koper in Medcezir (Tide in English), loosely based on The O.C. His character, Yaman, was based on Ben McKenzie’s character in The O.C, Ryan Atwood. From 2016 until 2017, Ulusoy played the lead role in the TV series İçerde with his co-star Aras Bulut Iynemli and Bensu Soral (Inside, partially based on the movie The Departed).

In 2016 alongside Leyla Lydia Tuğutlu, Ulusoy shot the movie Delibal. The same year he became the face of "Colin's" in Turkey and with Victoria's Secret model Taylor Hill acted in the commercial Bize Uyar for the company.

Between 2018 and 2020, Ulusoy played the lead role Hakan in the Netflix series The Protector. The Protector was the first ever Turkish Netflix series.

In March 2021, Ulusoy appeared as garbage collector Mehmet in the Can Ulkay directed Netflix movie Paper Lives. In April 2021, Turkish streaming platform BluTV announced that Ulusoy would return as the lead character Semih Ates in the period piece Yeşilçam.

== Filmography ==
Film
Year	Title	Role	Notes
2010	Recep İvedik 3	Dancer	Extra
2011	Anadolu Kartalları	Ahmet Onur	Leading role
2012	Paranoya	Himself	Short film
2015	Delibal	Barış Ayaz	Leading role
2021	Kağıttan Hayatlar	Mehmet	Leading role
2021	Birdie	Director	Short film
2024	Tam Bir Centilmen	Saygın	Leading role
2025	Uykucu	Ferman	Leading role
Television
Year	Title	Role	Notes
2009	Arka Sokaklar	Officer	Extra
2011–2012	Adını Feriha Koydum	Emir Sarrafoğlu	Leading role
2012	Eve Düşen Yıldırım	Emir Sarrafoğlu	Guest Appearance
2012	Emir'in Yolu	Emir Sarrafoğlu	Leading role
2013–2015	Medcezir	Yaman Koper	Leading role
2016–2017	İçerde	Sarp Yılmaz	Leading role
2018–2020	The Protector	Hakan Demir / Muhafız	Leading role
2020	Menajerimi Ara	Himself	Guest appearance
2021	Yeşilçam	Semih Ateş	Leading role
2023	The Tailor	Peyami	Leading role
2024	Kübra	Gökhan Şahinoğlu	Leading role
2024	Gaddar	Dağhan	Leading role
2025–2026	Eşref Rüya	Eşref Tek	Leading role
