= Halit Özgür Sarı =

Turkish actor and model (born 1993)

- Born: 4 October 1993 (age 32); Istanbul, Turkey
- Education: Istanbul Bilgi University, Department of Economics
- Occupations: Actor; model
- Years active: 2018–present

Halit Özgür Sarı (born 4 October 1993) is a Turkish actor and model. He is most famous for his role as Yaman in the TV series Yabani (2023–present). He is also known for his role as Kadir Eren in the series Kardeslerim (2021).

== Early life ==
Halit Özgür Sarı was born in 1993 in Istanbul. He said in an interview that he has Arab blood from his mother side, his grandfather is of Arab descent who immigrated from Aleppo in Syria. He graduated from the Istanbul Bilgi University, Department of Economics after graduating from high school. Halit modelled in his high school and college years and became the face of many brands. He further learnt acting from the Turkish actress Esra Kızıldoğan at the Basic and Advanced Acting Craft Studio during these years in front of the camera with the help of Enginay Kanat.

== Career ==
In 2018, Sarı began his career in the TV series, Diriliş: Ertuğrul, broadcast on TRT 1 created by Mehmet Bozdağ, with the role of 'Süleyman Alp', son of Selcan Hatun. He later gave life to the character of 'Arif' in the Netflix original series, The Protector in 2020, and later took part in Şampiyon (transl. Champion) as 'Kerem' which he is mostly known for also broadcast on TRT 1. He also played the role of 'Klinik Müdürü Murat' in the TV series Kırmızı Oda (transl. The Red Room) broadcast on TV8. He is known for appearing in big projects in such a short period of time.

== Personal life ==
Sarı is a strict fan of the football club, Fenerbahçe and he also expressed that he had a dream of being an astronaut when he was little. He also says that he sleeps too much and only wakes up when he is told to but is never late for anything. He is followed by 3 million people on Instagram.

== Filmography ==
Film
Year	Title	Role
2021	Geçen Yaz	Burak
2022	Private Lesson	Burak
Television
2018-2019	Diriliş: Ertuğrul	Süleyman Alp
2019-2020	Şampiyon	Kerem
2020	Hakan: Muhafız	Arif
2020	Kırmızı Oda	Clinic Manager Murat
2021	Kardeşlerim	Kadir Eren
2022	Gizli Saklı	Pamir Ulaş/Levent Güneş
2023-2025	Yabani	Yaman
2025	Gözleri KaraDeniz	Azil
