= Füsun Demirel =

Turkish actress (born 1958)

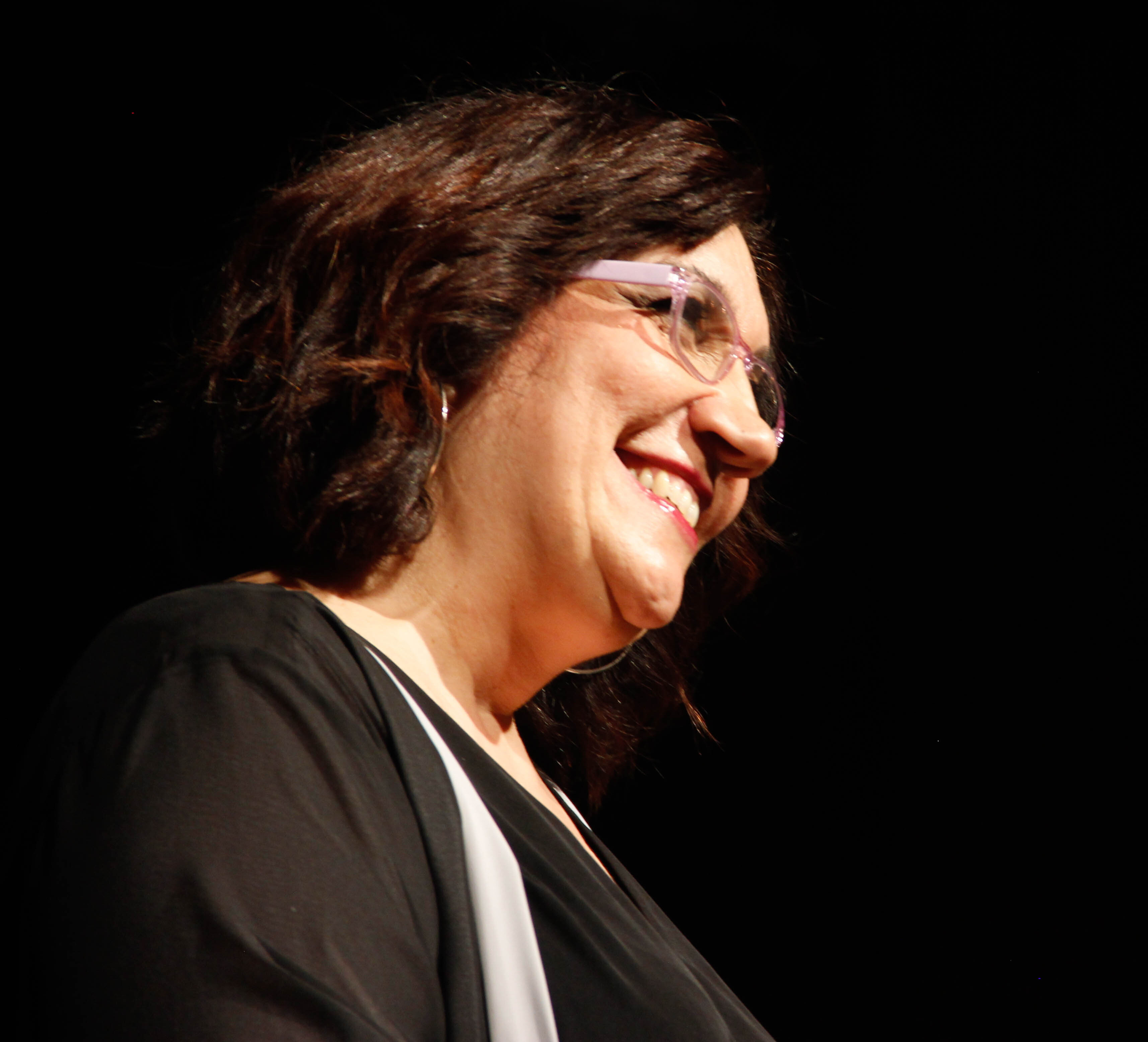
- Born: 13 June 1958 (age 67); Ankara, Turkey
- Occupation: Actress
- Years active: 1980–present
- Awards: 2001 – 39th Antalya Golden Orange Film Festival, "Best Supporting Actress" (Büyük Adam Küçük Aşk); 2015 – 20th Sadri Alışık Awards, "Best Actress in a Supporting Role - Comedy or Musical" (İçimdeki Ses)

Füsun Demirel (born 13 June 1958) is a Turkish actress and interpreter. She has appeared in more than sixty films since 1982.

== Selected filmography ==
Year	Title	Role	Notes
1985	Züğürt Ağa		
1989	Don't Let Them Shoot the Kite	Fatma	
1998	The Wound		
2001	Big Man, Little Love	Sakine	
2005	Borrowed Bride		
2017	Zer	Havva	
2021	Love Me Instead		
2022	Another Self		
