= The Protector (Turkish TV series) =

Turkish drama fantasy television series

- Turkish: Hakan: Muhafız
- Genre: Action; fantasy; science fiction
- Created by: Binnur Karaevli
- Based on: Karakalem ve Bir Delikanlının Tuhaf Hikayesi by Nilüfer İpek Gökdel
- Written by: Jason George; Yasemin Yılmaz; Emre Özpirinçci; Kerim Ceylan
- Directed by: Umut Aral; Gönenç Uyanık; Can Evrenol; Burcu Alptekin; Gökhan Tiryaki
- Starring: Çağatay Ulusoy; Ayça Ayşin Turan; Okan Yalabık; Hazar Ergüçlü; Burçin Terzioğlu; Engin Öztürk; Taner Ölmez; Funda Eryiğit
- Theme music composer: Tufan Aydın; Tolga Böyük; Emin Yasin Vural; Ekin Eti
- Country of origin: Turkey
- Original language: Turkish
- No. of seasons: 4
- No. of episodes: 32

Production
- Executive producers: Onur Güvenatam; Özge Bağdatlıoğlu; Jason George; Binnur Karaevli
- Producer: Alex Sutherland
- Production location: Istanbul
- Cinematography: Gökhan Tiryaki
- Running time: 30–50 minutes
- Production companies: Netflix; O3 Medya

Original release
- Network: Netflix
- Release: 14 December 2018 – 9 July 2020

The Protector (Turkish: Hakan: Muhafız) is a Turkish drama fantasy series starring Çağatay Ulusoy. The show was created by Binnur Karaevli, and the first season was directed by Umut Aral, Gönenç Uyanık, and Can Evrenol. The story is adapted from Turkish novelist Nilüfer İpek Gökdel's mystery novel Karakalem ve Bir Delikanlının Tuhaf Hikayesi (A Strange Story of Charcoal and a Young Man), which was published in 2016. The first season consists of ten episodes and became available for streaming on Netflix on 14 December 2018. The second season consists of eight episodes and became available on 26 April 2019. On 10 June 2019, the series was renewed for seasons 3 and 4. The fourth and last season was released on 9 July 2020.

== Synopsis ==
After his adoptive father, Neşet, is killed, Hakan Demir, an Istanbul shopkeeper, discovers that he is connected to an ancient secret order whose duty is to protect the city. Hakan must embrace his family's legacy as the Protector, a hero with the duty to kill the Immortal and prevent the city's destruction.

He is helped by Kemal and his daughter, Zeynep, members of the secret order of the Loyal Ones, who are dedicated to assisting the Protector.

== Cast and characters ==
=== Main ===
- Çağatay Ulusoy as
  - the Last Protector, Hakan Demir, a man in his twenties who works for his adoptive father, Neşet, in their small antique shop in the Grand Bazaar but dreams of opening a bigger store and becoming successful. After Neşet is killed by people looking for a mysterious Ottoman shirt, Zeynep and Kemal tell him to put the shirt on. As it fuses with his body, he becomes the Protector, the series' protagonist. (seasons 1–4)
  - the First Protector, Harun Muhafız
- Hazar Ergüçlü as Zeynep Erman, one of the Loyal Ones and Hakan's prevailing love interest. She is not much impressed with Hakan at first as she trains him in combat techniques but eventually becomes devoted to him and risks her life for him repeatedly. (seasons 1–4)
- Okan Yalabık as Faysal Erdem / Hüsrev Hodja, the series' antagonist, second Immortal, and a successful businessman whose career has inspired Hakan to try to better himself. (seasons 1–4)
- Ayça Ayşin Turan as Leyla Sancak, Erdem's assistant and Hakan's first love interest (seasons 1–2)
- Burçin Terzioğlu as Rüya Erdem / Cavidan, Faysal's wife / love interest (guest: seasons 1 and 4; main: seasons 2–3)
- Funda Eryiğit as Nisan Türk / Valeria, a chemist, first Immortal, and grand vizier; Hakan and Harun's love interest. (seasons 3–4)
- Engin Öztürk as Levent Demir, Hakan's brother (seasons 2–3)
- Yurdaer Okur as Kemal Erman, Zeynep's pharmacist father, also a Loyal One (season 1)

=== Supporting ===
- Mehmet Kurtuluş as Mazhar Dragusha, Erdem's henchman (season 1)
- Mehmet Yilmaz Ak as Tekin, a corrupt cop on Erdem's payroll (seasons 1, 4)
- Yücel Erten as Neşet Korkmaz, Hakan's adoptive father and a Loyal One (season 1)
- Cankat Aydos as Memo, Hakan's cousin with a gambling problem (season 1)
- Defne Kayalar as Suzan Bayraktar (season 1)
- Cihat Süvarioğlu as Yasin Karakaya, a journalist (season 1)
- Cem Yiğit Üzümoğlu as Emir, a Loyal One (season 1)
- Şenay Aydın as Derya, a Fallen One (seasons 1–2)
- Kubilay Karslıoğlu as Serdar, a Loyal One (seasons 1–2)
- Helin Kandemir as Ceylan, a Loyal One (seasons 1–2)
- Hakan Ummak as Can, a Loyal One (season 2)
- Çiğdem Selışık Onat as Azra, a Loyal One (season 2)
- Saygın Soysal as Mergen, an Immortal (seasons 1–2 and 4)
- Boran Kuzum as Okhan, an Immortal (seasons 2 and 4)
- Ayse Melike Çerçi as Piraye, an Immortal (seasons 2 and 4)
- Miray Daner as the Oracle (seasons 2–4)
- Emre Mutlu as Sami, a Loyal One (seasons 3–4)
- İlayda Alişan as Aylin, a Loyal One, later an Immortal (seasons 3–4)
- Bige Önal as Berrin, a Loyal One (seasons 3–4)
- Halit Özgür Sarı as Arif, a Loyal One (seasons 3–4)
- Taner Ölmez as Burak, a young man who helps Hakan and the Loyal Ones; Zeynep's love interest (seasons 3–4)
- Aksel Bonfil as Azim, Harun's best friend (season 4)
- Idil Yade Kirnik as Şirin, Harun's daughter (season 4)

== Episodes ==
Series	Episodes	Originally released
1	10	14 December 2018
2	8	26 April 2019
3	7	6 March 2020
4	7	9 July 2020

=== Season 1 (2018) ===
No. overall	No. in season	Title	Directed by	Written by	Original release date
1	1	"Episode 1"	Can Evrenol	Jason George	14 December 2018
2	2	"Episode 2"	Can Evrenol	Yasemin Yılmaz	14 December 2018
3	3	"Episode 3"	Can Evrenol	Emre Özpirinççi	14 December 2018
4	4	"Episode 4"	Umut Aral	Kerim Ceylan	14 December 2018
5	5	"Episode 5"	Umut Aral	Yasemin Yılmaz	14 December 2018
6	6	"Episode 6"	Umut Aral	Emre Özpirinççi	14 December 2018
7	7	"Episode 7"	Gönenç Uyanık	Kerim Ceylan, Binnur Karaevli	14 December 2018
8	8	"Episode 8"	Gönenç Uyanık	Emre Özpirinççi	14 December 2018
9	9	"Episode 9"	Can Evrenol	Volkan Sümbül	14 December 2018
10	10	"Episode 10"	Can Evrenol	Yasemin Yılmaz	14 December 2018

=== Season 2 (2019) ===
No. overall	No. in season	Title	Directed by	Written by	Original release date
11	1	"Episode 1"	Umut Aral	Cansu Çoban	26 April 2019
12	2	"Episode 2"	Umut Aral	Atasay Koç	26 April 2019
13	3	"Episode 3"	Umut Aral	Uğraş Güneş	26 April 2019
14	4	"Episode 4"	Gonenc Uyanik	Cansu Çoban	26 April 2019
15	5	"Episode 5"	Gonenc Uyanik	Jason George	26 April 2019
16	6	"Episode 6"	Gonenc Uyanik	Atasay Koç	26 April 2019
17	7	"Episode 7"	Gökhan Tiryaki	Ayşin Akbulut	26 April 2019
18	8	"Episode 8"	Gökhan Tiryaki	Yasemin Yilmaz	26 April 2019

=== Season 3 (2020) ===
No. overall	No. in season	Title	Directed by	Written by	Original release date
19	1	"Episode 1"	Umut Aral	Atasay Koç	6 March 2020
20	2	"Episode 2"	Umut Aral	Cansu Çoban	6 March 2020
21	3	"Episode 3"	Umut Aral	Aksel Bonfil	6 March 2020
22	4	"Episode 4"	Umut Aral	Deniz Gürlek	6 March 2020
23	5	"Episode 5"	Burcu Alptekin	Melek Seven	6 March 2020
24	6	"Episode 6"	Burcu Alptekin	Merih Aslan, Cansu Çoban	6 March 2020
25	7	"Episode 7"	Burcu Alptekin	Aksel Bonfil, Atasay Koç	6 March 2020

=== Season 4 (2020) ===
No. overall	No. in season	Title	Directed by	Written by	Original release date
26	1	"Episode 1"	Umut Aral	Atasay Koç	9 July 2020
27	2	"Episode 2"	Umut Aral	Cansu Çoban, Aksel Bonfil	9 July 2020
28	3	"Episode 3"	Umut Aral	Deniz Gürlek	9 July 2020
29	4	"Episode 4"	Burcu Alptekin	Melek Seven	9 July 2020
30	5	"Episode 5"	Burcu Alptekin	Cansu Çoban	9 July 2020
31	6	"Episode 6"	Gökhan Tiryaki	Deniz Gürlek, Melek Seven	9 July 2020
32	7	"Episode 7"	Gökhan Tiryaki	Atasay Koç	9 July 2020

== Production ==
Principal photography began on 7 March 2018, in Istanbul.
