= Aslıhan Malbora =

Turkish actress

- Born: 27 March 1995 (age 30); Afyonkarahisar, Turkey
- Education: Istanbul Technical University (Food and Chemical Engineering)
- Occupation: Actress
- Years active: 2017–present
- Website: aslihanmalbora.com

Aslıhan Malbora (born 27 March 1995) is a Turkish actress.

== Life and career ==
Aslıhan Malbora was born on 27 March 1995 in Afyonkarahisar. Her grandfather is of Yörük descent, which is a Turkic ethnic subgroup. She finished her primary and secondary education in her hometown. Malbora later moved to Istanbul and studied Food and Chemical Engineering at Istanbul Technical University. Within the same period she also started receiving acting lessons at different institutions, including Akademi 35.5 Art House, after which she started her acting career.

Malbora made her television debut in 2017, with a role in the TV series Seven Ne Yapmaz. She then portrayed Saliha Sultan in the historical fiction series Kalbimin Sultanı. She further rose to prominence in 2019 with her role in the romantic comedy TV series Her Yerde Sen. In 2021, she had the leading role in the Netflix original film Geçen Yaz. In the same year she began starring as Leyla in the action drama series Üç Kuruş.

== Filmography ==
=== Television ===
Year	Title	Role	Network	Episodes
2017	Seven Ne Yapmaz	Zeynep	ATV	11 episodes
2018	Kalbimin Sultanı	Saliha Sultan	Star TV	8 episodes
2018	Ağlama Anne	Zeynep Fırıncıoğlu	ATV	13 episodes
2019	Her Yerde Sen	Ayda Akman	Fox	23 episodes
2020	Gel Dese Aşk	Derin Düdenli	ATV	4 episodes
2021	Oluversin Gari	Derya	Fox	6 episodes
2021–2022	Üç Kuruş	Leyla Çaka	Show TV	28 episodes
2022	Darmaduman	Ece Servet	Fox	9 episodes
2024	Yaban Çiçekleri	Ela Ataman	ATV	3 episodes

=== Film ===
Year	Title	Role	Director
2020	Aile Hükümeti	Zeynep	Burak Demirdelen
2021	Herşeye Rağmen	Melahat	Erdal Murat Aktaş

=== Web ===
Year	Title	Role	Platform	Type
2021	Geçen Yaz	Ebru	Netflix	Film
2021	Etkileyici	Leyla Demir	Gain	Series
2024	Kübra	Merve	Netflix	Series
