= Ethos (TV series) =

Turkish television series

- Turkish: Bir Başkadır
- Genre: Drama; thriller
- Written by: Berkun Oya
- Directed by: Berkun Oya
- Starring: Öykü Karayel; Fatih Artman; Funda Eryiğit; Defne Kayalar; Tülin Özen
- Country of origin: Turkey
- Original languages: Turkish, Kurdish
- No. of seasons: 2
- No. of episodes: 12

Production
- Producers: Ali Farkhonde; Nisan Ceren Göçen
- Running time: 40–58 minutes
- Production company: Krek Film

Original release
- Network: Netflix
- Release: 12 November 2020

Ethos (Turkish: Bir Başkadır, lit. 'One of a kind') is a 2020 Turkish drama television series directed by Berkun Oya and starring Öykü Karayel, Fatih Artman, Funda Eryiğit, Defne Kayalar, and Tülin Özen. The show's first season was released on Netflix on 12 November 2020, consisting of eight episodes. It was set and filmed in Istanbul, Turkey, and tells the story of a group of unique characters from dramatically different socio-cultural backgrounds meeting in startling circumstances. A second season, of four episodes, was released six years later, on 12 November 2026.

== Synopsis ==
Ethos tells the story of Meryem, a part-time cleaner from a conservative family who lives on the outskirts of Istanbul. She experiences fainting spells and consults Peri, a psychiatrist whose background is dramatically different from Meryem's: she is educated, wealthy, and secular, and holds prejudicial views of openly religious people. Peri herself sees a therapist, to whom she complains about the growing conservatism in Turkish society. The series presents a variety of characters, including a rich but depressed playboy, a middle-class Kurdish family, a soap opera actress, a rape survivor, an ex-soldier, an intellectual, and a hodja and his closeted gay daughter, all of whom are somehow connected through Meryem, and together showcase the diversity of Turkish society.

== Cast and characters ==
- Öykü Karayel as Meryem
- Fatih Artman as Yasin, Meryem's domineering brother
- Funda Eryiğit as Ruhiye, Yasin's disturbed wife
- Defne Kayalar as Peri, a psychiatrist
- Settar Tanrıöğen as Ali Sadi (Hoca)
- Tülin Özen as Gülbin, a therapist counselling Peri
- Gökhan Yıkılkan as Hilmi
- Alican Yücesoy as Sinan, Meryem's wealthy employer
- Bige Önal as Hayrünnisa, the hodja's daughter
- Derya Karadaş as Gülan
- Öner Erkan as Rezan
- Nesrin Cavadzade as Melisa, a well-known soap opera actress
- Nazmi Kırık as Civan
- Gülçin Kültür Şahin as Mesude, the hodja's wife
- Özge Özel as Canan
- Esme Madra as Burcu, Hayrünnisa's girlfriend
- Aziz Çapkurt as Ramazan
- Cemre Zişan Sağbır as Esma, Ruhiye's daughter
- Göktuğ Yıldırım as İsmail, Ruhiye's son
- Nur Sürer as Feray, Peri's mother
- Taner Birsel as Orhan, Peri's father
- Nihal Koldaş as Sinan's mother
- Sinan Tuzcu as soap opera actor

== Episodes ==
Series	Episodes	Originally released
1	8	12 November 2020
2	4	12 November 2026

== Release ==
Ethos was released on 12 November 2020 on Netflix.

The second season, consisting of four episodes, was released on 12 November 2026.

== Reception ==
The series has received mostly positive reviews from critics and audiences. TRT World praised it for bringing many characters and perspectives together; however, it also noted that the series "falls short sometimes". Gazete Duvar also lauded the series concept and stated, "Ethos has put us all in the therapist's office and asked us to speak".
