= Simay Barlas =

Turkish actress

- Born: 7 May 1999 (age 27); Istanbul, Turkey
- Education: Istanbul Bilgi University
- Occupation: Actress
- Years active: 2014–present

Simay Barlas (born 7 May 1998) is a Turkish actress. She is well known for her role as Rüya in the TV series Yabani (2023–2025). She went on to win a Golden Butterfly Award for her role in the same.

Barlas is a graduate of Istanbul Bilgi University with a degree in Cinema and Television studies. She made her television debut in 2014 with a role in the TV series Paramparça. She then continued her career in television with recurring roles in youth series Adı Efsane and Hayat Bazen Tatlıdır. Between 2019–2020, she had a leading role in Kanal D drama series Zalim İstanbul. In 2019, she made her movie debut with the comedy Dijital Esaret.

== Filmography ==
=== Television ===
Year	Title	Role
2014	Paramparça	Öykü
2016–2017	Hayat Bazen Tatlıdır	Gözde Sarıyaz
2017	Adı Efsane	Naz Yalınay
2019–2020	Zalim İstanbul	Damla Karaçay
2020	Bir Annenin Günahı	Yağmur
2021–2022	Aziz	Efnan
2023	Ömer	Süreyya Kutlu
2023–2024	Yabani	Rüya
2024–2025	Sen Ağlama İstanbul	Şehrazat
2025	Aynadaki Yabancı	Azra/Defne
2026	Aşk ve Taht	Melike Hüma Hatun

=== Film ===
Year	Title	Role	Notes
2019	Dijital Esaret	Damla	Main role
