= Ece Çeşmioğlu =

Turkish actress (born 1990)

- Born: 26 November 1990 (age 35); Istanbul, Turkey
- Occupation: Actress
- Years active: 2002–present
- Spouse: Taner Ölmez (m. 2021)
- Children: 2

Ece Çeşmioğlu Ölmez (born 26 November 1990) is a Turkish actress. She is best known for hit family comedy series İki Aile, period series Öyle Bir Geçer Zaman Ki, Muhteşem Yüzyıl: Kösem and military series Söz.

== Biography ==
Ece Çeşmioğlu Ölmez was born on 26 November 1990 in Istanbul. Her family is from Istanbul, Turkey and from Yugoslavia. She graduated from the Theater Department of Mimar Sinan University State Conservatory. She started her acting career at the age of 12 in hit comedy family series Çocuklar Duymasın. Ece then drew attention with her performances in various TV series. With her husband Taner Ölmez, she played the character of Zeynep in the series Yüz Yüze (English: Face to Face) and later appeared as Atike Sultan in Muhteşem Yüzyıl: Kösem.

== Filmography ==
Web series
Year	Title	Role	Notes	Platform
2022	Yakamoz S-245	Yonca	Leading role	Netflix

TV series
Year	Title	Role	Notes	Network
2002	Çocuklar Duymasın			ATV
2004	Çocuğun Var Derdin Var			TGRT
2005	El Bebek Gül Bebek			TGRT
2005	Nehir			Kanal D
2005	Gümüş	Özge	Supporting role	Kanal D
2006–2008	İki Aile	Ceren Karaman	Supporting role	Star TV
2008	Eyvah Halam	Asya	Supporting role	Star TV
2011–2012	Firar	Bahar	Leading role	Star TV
2012–2013	Öyle Bir Geçer Zaman ki	Ayça	Supporting role	Kanal D
2015	Yaz'ın Öyküsü	Yaz	Leading role	Kanal D
2016	Kalbim Yangın Yeri	Sevda Günsoy	Leading role	Fox
2016–2017	Muhteşem Yüzyıl: Kösem	Atike Sultan	Supporting role	Fox
2017	Yüz Yüze	Zeynep	Leading role	Show TV
2018	Yuvamdaki Düşman	Ceren	Leading role	Show TV
2018–2019	Söz	Melisa Yılmaz	Supporting role	Star TV
2020	Tutunamayanlar	İrem	Leading role	TRT 1
2026	Yeraltı	Hülya Habban	Supporting role	Now

Film
Year	Title	Role	Notes
2010	Ev	06 Setenay	Leading role
2011	Başlangıç		Leading role
2015	Kuş		Leading role
2020	Türkler Geliyor: Adaletin Kılıcı	Alina	Leading role
2021	Bembeyaz	Sonay	Leading role
2021	Geçen Yaz	Aslı	Leading role
2022	Mukavemet	Ecem	Leading role
