= Selen Öztürk =

Turkish actress (born 1980)

- Born: 23 July 1980 (age 46); İzmir, Turkey
- Occupation: Actress
- Years active: 1994–present

Selen Öztürk (born 23 July 1980) is a Turkish actress, who gained fame as Gülfem Hatun, Sultan Süleyman first childless wife in Muhteşem Yüzyıl. She also appeared in drama and historical series like Payitaht: Abdülhamid, Atiye, Kizil Goncalar and Hatirla Gönül.

== Life and career ==
Her mother was a Turkish Cypriot from Northern Cyprus, while her father was from Uşak.

In 2004, Öztürk graduated from Hacettepe University State Conservatory. Soon after graduation, she moved to Istanbul and started her career on stage. Aside from her career as an actress, she appeared in various movies and TV series, most notably in Muhteşem Yüzyıl as Gülfem Hatun and in Payitaht: Abdülhamid as Seniha Sultan. Since 1994, she has worked as a voice actress and has voiced over characters in the Turkish dubbed version of movies such as The Unbearable Lightness of Being, Léon: The Professional, Layer Cake and Sin City.

== Filmography ==
=== Film ===
- Aşkları Ege'de Kaldı - 2002
- Kukla (short Film) - 2007
- Sonsuz - (Nurse Ayten) - 2009
- Çilek - (Ceren) - 2014
- Çiçero - 2019
- Pocket Hercules: Naim Suleymanoglu - 2019
- Kağıttan Hayatlar - 2021

=== Television ===
- Kara Yılan - (Asiye) - 2007
- Bir Varmış Bir Yokmuş - (Sema) - 2008
- Muhteşem Yüzyıl - (Gülfem Hatun) - 2011–2014
- Benim Adım Gültepe - (Meziyet) - 2014
- Serçe Sarayı - (Aliye) - 2015
- Hatırla Gönül - (Figen) - 2015
- Payitaht: Abdülhamid - (Seniha Sultan) - 2017–2019
- Azize - (Tuna Alpan) - 2019
- Atiye - (Seher Altın) - 2020
- Çocukluk - (Gülay) - 2020
- Misafir - (Nazan) - 2021
- Kizil Goncalar-Hasna Gunes-2023
