= Jawan TV =

Television channel in Afghanistan

- Country: Afghanistan
- Broadcast area: Afghanistan
- Headquarters: Sayed Amin Hussaini

Programming
- Picture format: SDTV

Ownership
- Owner: Sayed Habib Hussaini

History
- Launched: 2014

Jawan TV (Persian: تلویزیون جوان) is private TV channel in Afghanistan launched in 2014.

== Programs ==
=== TV shows ===
- Prison Break (فرار از زندان)
- Karagül (گل سیاه)
- küçük Gelin (عروس خوردسال)
- Medcezir (قصه عشق)
- Kaderimin Yazıldığı Gün (سرنوشت)
- Jawan Trailer Review

== See also ==
- Television in Afghanistan
