= Hazar Ergüçlü =

Cypriot-Turkish actress

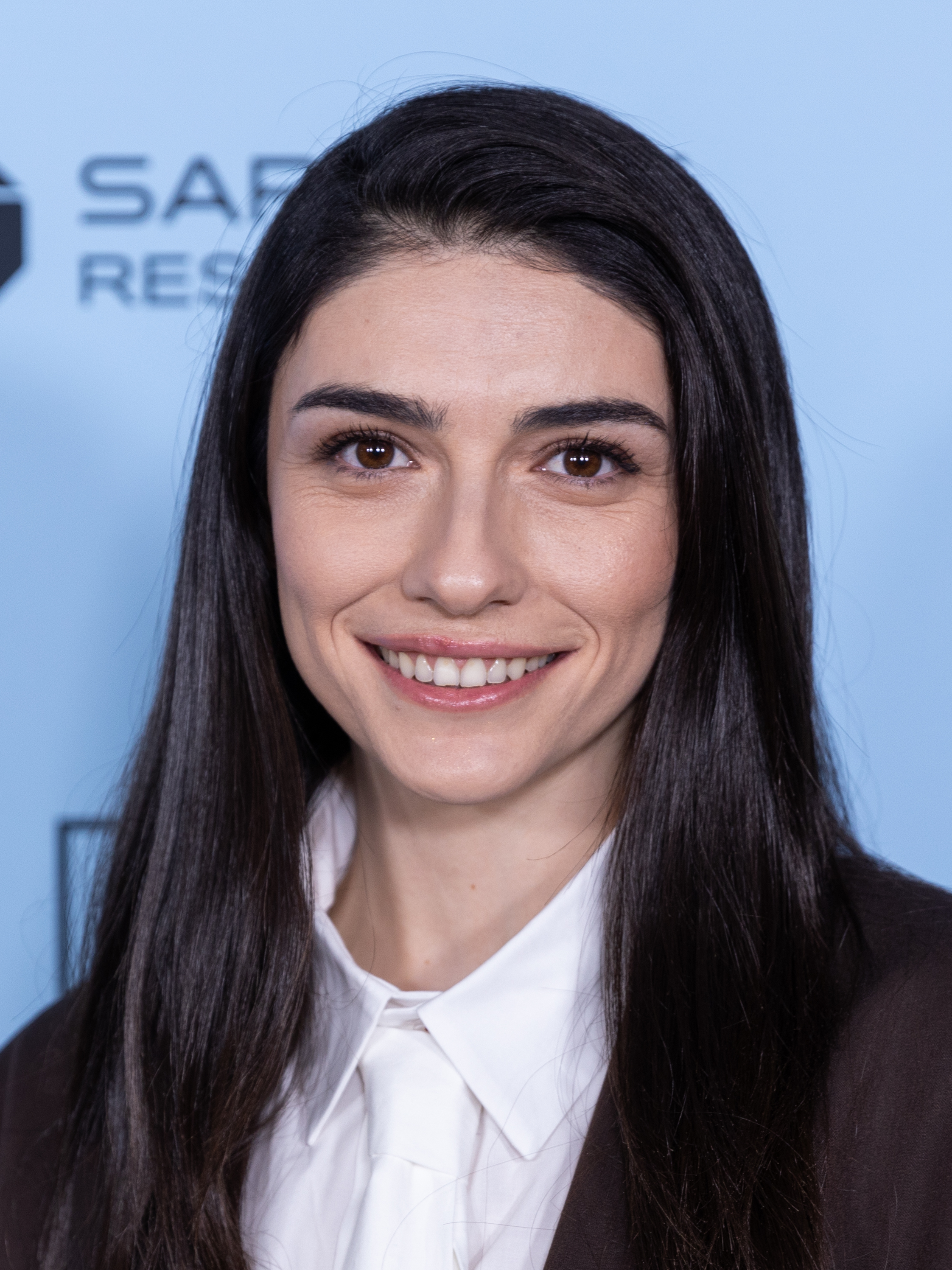
- Ergüçlü at the 2025 Sundance Film Festival
- Born: Hazar Ergüçlü; 1 January 1993 (age 33); Nicosia, Northern Cyprus
- Education: Haliç University
- Occupation: Actress
- Years active: 2010–present

Hazar Ergüçlü (Turkish pronunciation: [haˈzaɾ ˈæɾɟyt͡ʃly]; born 1 January 1993) is a Cypriot-Turkish actress. She is best known for her roles in television series North South (2011–2013), Ebb and Tide (2013–2015), The Protector (2018–2020), Pearl Beads (2024), and films Snow (2017), The Wild Pear Tree (2018), Heartsong (2022), and The Things You Kill (2025).

== Early life ==
Ergüçlü was born in the northern part of Nicosia, Northern Cyprus. Her mother Neşe Ergüçlü works for a TV channel and her father Süleyman Ergüçlü works for a newspaper. She graduated from the theatre department of Haliç University.

== Career ==
She has starred in a number of films, including Gölgeler ve Suretler, Açlığa Doymak, Benim Dünyam, Balık, Dar Elbise, Mahalle, Kar, Manyak, Ahlat Ağacı, and Herşey Seninle Güzel. She is a Siyad Award and Adana Film Festival Award winner. To go along with her extensive cinema career, she has had leading roles in a number of TV series, including Rüya Gibi, Kuzey Güney, Medcezir, Analar ve Anneler, Yüksek Sosyete, Hayat Sırları, and Dudullu Postası.

== Filmography ==
=== Film ===
Year	Title	Role
2010	Gölgeler ve Suretler	Ruhsar
2012	Açlığa Doymak	Sena
2013	Benim Dünyam	Ayla
2014	Balık	
2016	Dar Elbise	
2017	Mahalle	
2017	Kar	Müzzeyen
2018	Manyak	
2018	Ahlat Ağacı	Hatice Karasu
2018	Herşey Seninle Güzel	
2022	Heartsong	Sümbül
2022	Hollow	Nazil
2025	The Things You Kill	Hazar

=== Television ===
Year	Title	Role	Notes
2006	Rüya Gibi		Guest Appearance
2011–2013	Kuzey Güney	Simay Canaş	Supporting role
2013–2015	Medcezir	Eylül Buluter	Leading role
2015	Analar ve Anneler	Kader Ayaz	Leading role
2016	Yüksek Sosyete	Cansu Koran	Leading role
2017–2018	Hayat Sırları	Seher Kuzgun	Leading role
2018	Dudullu Postası	Melis	Leading role
2018–2020	The Protector	Zeynep	Leading role
2019	The Mallorca Files	Azra Bolat	Supporting role
2020–2021	Alev Alev	Çiçek Görgülü	Leading role
2020	Menajerimi Ara	Herself	Guest appearance
2021	Saklı	Aslı	Leading role
2022	Hayat Bugün	Suzan Mayer	Leading role
2022–2023	Sadece Arkadaşız	Ece	Leading role
2024–2026	İnci Taneleri	Dilber	Leading role
