= Rojbin Erden =

Turkish actress and model

Rojbin Erden (born 15 August 2000, in Istanbul) is a Turkish actress and model. She is best known for her role as Asi in the television series Yabani (2023–2025), for which she won a Golden Butterfly Award.

Erden graduated from Istanbul University's State Conservatory in the Opera Department. Before transitioning to acting, she worked professionally as a model.

== Career ==
She made her television debut in 2021 in the series Çıplak. She gained further recognition for her portrayal of Melek in the series Gelsin Hayat Bildiği Gibi (2022–2023). In 2023, she was cast as Asi in the drama series Yabani.

=== Golden Butterfly Best TV Couple award ===
Her performance received critical acclaim, and in 2024, she and co-star Bertan Asllani won the "Best TV Couple" award at the 50th Golden Butterfly Awards.

According to a column by Okun Ün, Rojbin Erden and Bertan Asllani advanced to the second round in the “Best TV Couple” category at the Pantene Golden Butterfly through public votes via the “other” option in the first round. The column also noted that their progression was attributed to fan participation in the initial voting stage. During the first round of voting for the Pantene Golden Butterfly, there was an “other” option at the bottom of the ballot. Voters could manually write in names that were not already listed among the official nominees.

== Filmography ==
Year	Title	Role	Notes
2021	Çıplak		Television debut
2022–2023	Gelsin Hayat Bildiği Gibi	Melek	Supporting role
2023–2025	Yabani	Asi	Supporting role
2026-present	Sevdiğim Sensin	Feride/Derya Demir	Supporting role
