= Mazlum Çimen =

Mazlum Çimen (born 18 June 1958 in Elbistan, Kahramanmaraş) is a Turkish musician, ballet dancer, film actor, folk singer, and award-winning film score composer.

== Early life ==
He was born in Sevdilli village of Elbistan in Kahramanmaraş Province on 18 June 1958. He is the son of Nesimi Çimen who is a great Ashik, songwriter and Cura Virtuoso in history. His parents originate however from Hozat in Tunceli Province.

His family moved to Istanbul as he was still of pre-school age. After Mazlum finished his primary school education, he attended Istanbul State Conservatory to study violin. Four years later, he switched over to the ballet dancing section of the same music school and graduated in 1981. He entered Istanbul State Opera and Ballet as a ballet dancer, where he is still employed.

== Music career ==
Mazlum toured across the country with his father Nesimi Çimen, a well-known folk music singer, and was so introduced to music composing. He created his first compositions in 1980. With his music teacher İhsan Yüce's initiation, he stepped into the film music field, where he found the strong support of Onat Kutlar, a poet and co-founder of the Istanbul International Film Festival.

His first commercial compositions were for the film Mem û Zin in 1991 and for the TV mini-series Aysarı'nın Zilleri in 1992. He was awarded three times the Golden Orange and twice the Golden Boll for best film score. In 2008, he received the Best Film Score Award for Nokta at the Montpellier Mediterranean Film Festival in France.

Beside composing film and TV mini-series score in addition to his primary profession as ballet dancer, Mazlum Çimen plays in movies, sings and records folk music.

== Filmography ==
=== Film score ===
- 68'den 6 Mayıs'a
- Nazım Hikmet Belgeseli
- Mem û Zin (1991)
- Gelincik Tarlası (1993)
- Soğuk Geceler (1994) aka Kalte Nächte
- Hollywood Kaçakları (1996)
- Işıklar Sönmesin (1996)
- Büyük Adam Küçük Aşk (2002) aka Hejar or Big Man, Little Love or Megali exousia, mikri agapi
- Gönlümdeki Köşk Olmasa (2002) aka Omfavn mig måne or House of Hearts
- Martılar Açken (2002)
- Oyun (2005)
- Solgun Duvarlı Kent (2007)
- Son Cellat (2008)
- Nokta (2008) aka Dot
- Umut (film) (2009)
- Köy (2009) aka The Village

=== TV mini-series score ===
- Aysarı'nın Zilleri (1992)
- Berivan (2002)
- Gelin (2003) aka The Bride
- Şıh Senem (2003)
- Hacı (2006) aka Hadji
- Kara Duvak (2007)
- Hanımın Çiftliği (2009)

Şevkat Yerimdar

=== Theatre music ===
- Yunus Emre (1989 Diyarbakır State Theatre)
- Ferhat ile Şirin (İstanbul City Theatre)

=== Actor ===
- Hababam Sınıfı Güle Güle (1981)
- Hoşçakal Yarın (1998) or Goodbye Tomorrow - Yusuf Arslan
- Gönlümdeki Köşk Olmasa (2002) - Ali
- Anlat İstanbul (2004) - Şehmuz
- Son Cellat (2008) - Ampul Adam
- Yahşi Batı (2009) - Wanted Şerif I
- Umut (2009) - İlyas
- Söz Vermiştin (2019) - Mazlum

== Albums ==
- Çimen Türküleri, Ada Müzik (1995)
- Mem ü Zin, Kalan Müzik (1996)
- Çimen Sesleri, Ada Müzik (2001)
- Feryadı İsyanım, Ada Müzik (2002)
- Buluşmalar, Kalan Müzik (2006)

Awards
Preceded by Serdar Kalafatoğlu	Golden Orange Award for Best Music Score; 1995 for Soğuk Geceler	Succeeded by Yalçın Tura
Preceded by Timur Selçuk	Golden Boll Award for Best Music Score; 1995 for Soğuk Geceler	Succeeded by Can Hakgüder
Preceded by Kardeş Türküler	Golden Orange Award for Best Music Score; 2002 for Gönlümdeki Köşk Olmasa	Succeeded by Timur Selçuk
Preceded by Zülfü Livaneli	Golden Orange Award for Best Music Score; 2008 for Nokta	Succeeded by Mehmet Erdem; Özgür Akgül
Preceded by Rahman Altın	Golden Boll Award for Best Music Score; 2008 for Nokta	Succeeded by Nail Yurtsever
