= Uraz Kaygılaroğlu =

Turkish actor

- Born: 30 June 1987 (age 38); Istanbul, Turkey
- Occupations: Actor, TV presenter
- Years active: 2008–present
- Spouse: Melis İşiten (m. 2014; div. 2019)
- Children: 1
- Awards: Golden Star 2020 – Most Admired Cinema Actor of the Year; Yeditepe Dilek 2021 – Best Actor of the Year; İzmir Film Festival 2020 – Best Male Actor in a Supporting role (Sefirin Kızı)

Uraz Kaygılaroğlu (born 30 June 1987) is a Turkish actor, stand-up comedian and TV presenter. He is a graduate of Istanbul Bilgi University with a degree in commercials and advertising.

== Career ==
=== TV series ===
Kaygılaroğlu started his career in 2008. After he played a role in popular youth series "Es-Es", His breakthrough came in 2011 with a role in the Show TV teen comedy drama series Pis Yedili. He simultaneously joined the cast of Fox's comedy series Harem, portraying the character of Feminen Ağa. In 2013, he appeared in the TRT 1 series Eski Hikâye as Ömer.

In 2014, he was cast in the TRT 1 period drama Yedi Güzel Adam based life of poet "Adil Erdem Bayazıt". He returned comedy between 2015 and 2017, he starred with co-star ”Berna Koraltürk” in the comedy series Baba Candır as Haluk Güney . This role became phenomenon. He was praised by critics for drama and comedy success.

He played the role of Kuzen Volki on Show TV's Klavye Delikanlıları series and in the movie "Çakallarla Dans 5". In the same year, he starred in the drama series Masum Değiliz and Egenin Hamsisi.

He played in Star TV's drama series Sefirin Kızı. He played leading role in crime series "Üç Kuruş".He is now playing in Star TV's drama series "Sakla beni" as Mete.

=== Web series ===
He had leading role in short comedy series Aynen Aynen. He played an actor and his many roles in Netflix spin off comedy series Erşan Kuneri. He had guest roles in Ayak İşleri and Aşk 101.

=== Films ===
He played in film "Dede Korkut Hikayeleri: Bamsı Beyrek". It is written by Burak Aksak famous writer of hit surreal comedy Leyla ile Mecnun . The film isn't original story of Book of Dede Korkut. It is parody.

He was cast in romantic comedy Dönerse Senindir alongside Murat Boz, Yasemin Allen, İrem Sak. He appeared in film series "Karakomik Filmler" with Cem Yılmaz again.

With Demet Özdemir, Binnur Kaya, he played in dance film "Sen Kiminle Dans Ediyorsun" which written and directed by Burak Aksak.

In 2020, he had a leading role with Merve Dizdar in the Gupse Özay's comedy film Eltilerin Savaşı, which as of April 2023 is the 23rd most-watched movie of all time in Turkey according to Box Office Türkiye.

=== Stand Up ===
He performs stand up "Ek İş".

=== Tv Presenter ===
Between 2012 and 2017, He presented the contests "Sıra Sende Türkiye", "Kuyruk", "Ve Kazanan", "Takip", "Tam Zamanı" and "Kamuflaj".

== Filmography ==
Film
Title	Year	Role
Eltilerin Savaşı	2020	Fatih
Feride	2020	(minor role)
Karakomik Filmler	2019	Ethem
Çakallarla Dans 5	2018	Kuzen Volki (Sinan)
Sen Kiminle Dans Ediyorsun?	2017	Selim
Dede Korkut Hikayeleri: Salur Kazan - Zoraki Kahraman	2017	(voice)
Dede Korkut Hikayeleri: Bamsı Beyrek	2016	Bamsı Beyrek
Dönerse Senindir	2016	Kurt
Ejder Kapanı	2009	
Web series
Title	Year	Role
Aktris	2023	Fatih
Erşan Kuneri	2022	İbrahim Tumtum
Aşk 101	2021	Sinan (adult)
Ayak İşleri	2021	Guest
Aynen Aynen	2019, 2021	Emir
A Round of Applause	2024	
TV series
Title	Year	Role
Yeraltı	2026	Bozkurt Hanoğlu
Sakla Beni	2023–2024	Mete
Üç Kuruş	2021–2022	Kartal Çaka
Sefirin Kızı	2019–2021	Gediz Işıklı
Ege'nin Hamsisi	2018	Deniz Çınar
Masum Değiliz	2018	Mert
Klavye Delikanlı'ları	2017	Volkan (Cousin Volki)
Heredot Cevdet Saati	2015	Haluk Güney
Baba Candır	2015–2017	Haluk Güney
Yedi Güzel Adam	2014	Adil Erdem Bayazıt
Eski Hikâye	2013	Ömer
Harem	2012	Feminen Ağa
Pis Yedili	2011–2013	Canburger
Es Es	2009–2010	Fethi
Canını Sevdiğiminin İstanbul'u	2009	Ferhat
Milyonda Bir	2008	Berke
Theatre
Title	Year	Role
Güldür Güldür Show		Guest
Short film
Title	Year	Role
Nerde Kalmıştık	2009	
Mezuniyet (student project film)	2009	

== Stand up ==
- Ek İş

== TV programs ==
- Sıra Sende Türkiye (2017)
- Kuyruk (2016)
- Ve Kazanan (2015)
- Takip (2014)
- Tam Zamanı (2013)
- Kamuflaj (2012)
