= Meriç Aral =

Turkish actress

- Born: 17 November 1988 (age 37); Istanbul, Turkey
- Occupation: Actress
- Years active: 2012–present
- Spouse: Serkan Keskin (m. 2024)
- Children: 1

Meriç Aral (born 17 November 1988) is a Turkish actress. After studying law, she started acting and became known with her role as Hale in Medcezir. She has taken part in various cinema and television productions.

== Life and career ==
Aral was born on 17 November 1988, to parents who were lawyers. She graduated from Istanbul Bilgi University School of Law, but also minored in comparative literature. She started acting after passing an internship. She worked as a film assistant for a short time. Aral made her television debut in the series Sultan and started to study acting. She rose to prominence with her role as Hale in Medcezir. Then he played in the movie Unutursam Fısılda, directed by Çağan Irmak. In the following period, she appeared in the series Yüksek Sosyete (2016) and in the movie Hesapta Aşk (2015) and Cingöz Recai: Bir Efsanenin Dönüşü (2017). She was then cast in a leading role in the TV series Söz alongside Tolga Sarıtaş, Deniz Baysal, Sarp Akkaya and Nihat Altınkaya between 2017 and 2019. In 2020, she played the character of Beril in the movie Biz Böyleyiz.

== Filmography ==
Television
Year	Title	Role	Notes
2012	Sultan	Diyar	Supporting role
2013–2014	Medcezir	Hale	Supporting role
2016	Yüksek Sosyete	Ece	Leading role
2017–2019	Söz	Eylem Mercier	Leading role
2020–2021	Kırmızı Oda	Doctor Ayşe	Leading role
2021–2022	Kaderimin Oyunu	Helin Demirhan	Leading role
2022	Yakamoz S-245	Hatice Çelik	Supporting role
2024–2025	Sandık Kokusu	Irmak Çelik	Leading role
2024	Kimler Geldi, Kimler Geçti	Funda	Supporting role
Film
2013	Balayı		Leading role
2014	Muska	Melis	Supporting role
2014	Unutursam Fısılda	Mediha	Supporting role
2015	Hesapta Aşk	Ezgi	Leading role
2017	Cingöz Recai	Filiz	Supporting role
2018	Yanımda Kal	Zeynep	Leading role
2020	Biz Böyleyiz	Beril	Leading role
