= Çukur =

2017 Turkish television series

- Genre: Action; Drama; Thriller
- Written by: Gökhan Horzum (Season 1–4); Damla Serim (Season 3–4)
- Directed by: Sinan Öztürk (Season 1–4); Özgür Sevimli (Season 2)
- Starring: Aras Bulut İynemli; Dilan Çiçek Deniz; Ercan Kesal; Perihan Savaş; Şenay Gürler; Erkan Kolçak Köstendil; Mustafa Kırantepe; Öner Erkan; Rıza Kocaoğlu; Necip Memili; Damla Sönmez; Burak Dakak; Burak Sergen; Berkay Ateş; Erkan Avcı; Tansu Biçer; Cihangir Ceyhan; Salih Kalyon; Nur Sürer; Mustafa Avkıran; Nejat İşler; Barış Arduç; Müfit Kayacan; Hazal Subaşı; Mustafa Üstündağ
- Theme music composer: Toygar Işıklı
- Opening theme: "Çukur Jenerik"
- Composer: Toygar Işıklı
- Country of origin: Turkey
- Original language: Turkish
- No. of seasons: 4
- No. of episodes: 131

Production
- Producers: Kerem Çatay (4 seasons); Pelin Diştaş (season 1–2)
- Production locations: Istanbul; Nevşehir; Paris; Berlin
- Running time: 120 minutes
- Production company: Ay Yapım

Original release
- Network: Show TV
- Release: 23 October 2017 – 7 June 2021

Çukur (transl. "The Pit") is a Turkish action, drama and crime thriller television series produced by Ay Yapım, directed by Sinan Öztürk and written by Gökhan Horzum and Damla Serim. It premiered on 23 October 2017 and concluded on 7 June 2021 with a total of 131 episodes (four seasons).

== Plot ==
The Koçovalı family is in control of Çukur, the crime-ridden neighborhood of Istanbul. Despite being so involved in crime, the family has its own rules. One of these rules is the prohibition of drugs. No drugs are produced, used or sold in Çukur. But the groups that are new to the game try to break the ban.

== Filming ==
Çukur is shot in the Balat district of Istanbul's Fatih district. Some scenes of the first and second episodes of the first season were shot in Paris, the capital of France, and some scenes of the third season were shot in Berlin, the capital of Germany. After the series ended, in 2022, a fire broke out in the building of the coffee house where the series was shot.

== Cast ==
Actor	Characters	About
Aras Bulut İynemli	Yamaç Koçovalı	Youngest son of İdris and Sultan Koçovalı. He left his family and became a musician after killing an assassin to protect his family. He is forced to return to Çukur after his brother Kahraman's assassination to become its leader. Strategically sharp, exceptional in combat, and deeply protective, he constantly battles psychological trauma and deadly threats. Initially, he falls in love with Sena and marries her. After her tragic death, he has a brief relationship with Nehir, but eventually falls in love with Efsun and marries her. He has son with Nehir named Yamac Jr. and a daughter with Efsun named Masal.
Dilan Çiçek Deniz	Sena Koçovalı	Yamaç's first love and wife. Her life takes a dramatic turn after marrying Yamaç as she struggles to adapt to life in Çukur. After Çukur was taken over by the Karakuzular, she looks after the family and advises Yamaç to bring all his brothers together to take back Çukur. She is kidnapped by Mahsun during the Karakuzular's attack and is killed by Yücel, who drowns her inside a glass chamber filled with water.
Damla Sönmez	Efsun Kent	Baykal's daughter with Şifa. An intelligent and wealthy businesswoman, she initially forms an alliance with Yücel, Azer, Timsah, and Akın against the Koçovalı family to seek revenge for her father's death. However, she falls deeply in love with Yamaç and becomes pregnant with their daughter Masal. Later, she is kidnapped by Kulkan Erdenet and held captive alongside her daughter by Nizam, before being rescued by Yamaç, whom she eventually marries.
Erkan Kolçak Köstendil	Salih Koçovalı (Vartolu Sadettin)	İdris Koçovalı's illegitimate son with Mihriban. Abandoned after his mother's death, he grows up to become a ruthless drug and returns to Çukur to seek revenge. He orders the assassination of his half-brother Kahraman and forms an alliance with Selim, Emrah, and Nazım, taking over Çukur. Over time, he reconciles with his family and becomes one of Çukur's loyal defenders. He shares a deep love with his childhood friend Saadat, whom he eventually marries and has a son with named Idris Jr.
Ercan Kesal	İdris Koçovalı	Founder and leader of the Çukur neighborhood mafia. Sultan's husband and father of Cumali, Kahraman, Selim, Salih, and Yamaç. He is highly respected as the benevolent father figure of Çukur and he enforces strict rules across the neighborhood, most notably an absolute ban on drug trafficking. He sacrifices himself and forces Yamaç to kill him to protect their family in a trap set by Yücel.
Perihan Savaş	Sultan Koçovalı	İdris's wife and mother of Cumali, Kahraman, Selim, and Yamaç. Fiercely devoted to preserving her family, she is highly respected by the Çukur neighborhood as a mother figure. She is very strict and often makes cold decisions driven by traditional rules and honor, most notably exiling her stepson Salih from the neighborhood and keeping his existence hidden from her husband.
Öner Erkan	Selim Koçovalı	İdris and Sultan's son. Ayşe's ex-husband and father of Akın and Karaca. Calm and calculated, he feels neglected and desires his father's love and respect. Initially, he betrays his family and forms an alliance with Salih/Vartolu, Emrah, and Nazım to take over Çukur. Later, he redeems himself by taking care of his family and reconciles with them. He is lured into a trap and killed by Çağatay Erdenet while carrying Çukur's property ownership documents back to the neighborhood.
Necip Memili	Cumali Koçovalı	Oldest son of İdris and Sultan. Named after his uncle, he is a fiercely violent hothead who spent 11 years in prison before escaping to avenge his family. He has an old-school mentality and is deeply loyal to his family and Çukur. He holds a grudge against his half-brother Salih/Vartolu for killing their brother Kahraman, but eventually forgives him. He has an arranged marriage with Damla but later the two fall in love and have a daughter together named Asiye.
Rıza Kocaoğlu	Ali Çoban (Aliço)	Garbage man and skilled sniper who has autism. Son of military commander Yavuz Çoban. Mentally abused by his father, he ran away from home and was taken in by İdris Koçovalı and Çukur. He is highly intelligent and has an exceptional photographic memory, helping Çukur against its enemies. He has a special bond with Yamaç and serves as his most trusted friend. He falls in love with Hale and her untimely death severely affects him.
Mustafa Üstündağ	Kahraman Koçovalı	İdris and Sultan's son. Nedret's husband and father of Akşın and Acar. Charismatic and quick-tempered, he became his father's right-hand man while his older brother Cumali was in prison. He is killed by his half-brother Salih/Vartolu's men, which forces Yamaç to return to Çukur and take over the family business.
Burak Dakak	Akın Koçovalı	Selim and Ayşe's son. İdris Koçovalı's eldest grandchild who suffers from asthma. Initially, he is resentful towards his family and has ambitions of becoming Çukur's leader. He rescues Yücel from death and collaborates with him, Efsun, Azer, and Timsah in their plan to kill his grandfather İdris. Later, he feels guilty and redeems himself by helping his family and Çukur. He falls in love with Yasmin, whom he eventually marries.
Burak Sergen	Baykal Kent (Beyefendi)	Powerful businessman and crime lord. Father of Nazım, Emrah, and Efsun. He is a manipulative man who poses as a peacemaker and friend to Yamaç, while secretly orchestrating attacks against the Koçovalı family. He collaborates with Salih and Selim to take over Çukur, but later has a fallout with them. He is betrayed by his son Nazım and killed by the Russian mafia as revenge for killing their leader.
Tansu Biçer	Yücel Tansoy (Yüzüklü)	Co-founder and former co-leader of the Karakuzular gang. He is a ruthless and cold-hearted mastermind seeking the complete destruction of the Koçovalı family to avenge his father Edip's death. Operating from the shadows, he kills Sena and Akşın and ultimately sets a trap with the help of Azer, Efsun, Timsah, and Akın that forces Yamaç to kill his own father İdris. Later, he starts working for Çağatay Erdenet before being killed by Yamaç.
Erkan Avcı	Çeto	Co-founder and co-leader of the Karakuzular gang. Ruthless and manipulative, he takes over Çukur with Mahsun and the Karakuzular after ambushing the Koçovalı family. He secretly sells organs of deceased Karakuzular members and hides this secret from Mahsun. He is eventually killed by Mahsun after tricking him into killing his own father.
Berkay Ateş	Fikret Canseven (Mahsun)	Co-leader of the Karakuzular gang. Emotionally unstable and violent, he shares a deep bond with Çeto. However, he falls in love with Sena and ends up killing Çeto after being manipulated into killing his own father. Following Sena's death, he experiences regret and dedicates his life to protecting Yamaç. He eventually leaves Çukur with the remaining Karakuzular members and his real mother to start a new life.
Mustafa Avkıran	Cengiz Erdenet	Istanbul's wealthiest and most powerful businessman. Father of Ogeday, Çağatay, Arık Böke, and Kulkan. He is the head of Istanbul's largest drug trafficking business and the owner of the Erdenet Holding. He is mostly driven by money and uses his power to force Yamaç into working for him. He is killed by Yamaç, Cumali, and Akın in a trap that forces him to commit suicide.
Nejat İşler	Çağatay Erdenet	Cengiz Erdenet's older son with Olga. Cold-heaarted and calculated, he is Istanbul's most powerful crime lord, supervising his father's drug trafficking business. He engages in a long-term war with the Koçovalı family and Çukur, ultimately killing Selim to avenge his brother Arık Böke. He is killed by Yamaç, Cumali, and Akın in a landmine explosion.
Barış Arduç	Arık Böke Erdenet	Cengiz Erdenet's younger son with Olga. Impulsive and skilled in combat, he has an intense rivalry with Yamaç and orchestrates attacks on Çukur and the Koçovalı family. He is killed by Cumali in a violent confrontation.
Müfit Kayacan	Cumali Koçovalı Sr. (Halil İbrahim Gökçetaş)	İdris Koçovalı's older brother. Long thought to be dead, he is the head of a drug trafficking mafia in Turkey and Afghanistan. He was previously shot by İdris to protect Çukur from drugs, however, he survived and was banished by İdris. By manipulating Salih, he returns seeking vengeance and control over Çukur, completely changing the neighborhood and secretly killing Celasun, Karaca, and Emmi. He is killed by Salih and Akın after being trapped in a pit.
Cihangir Ceyhan	Azer Kurtuluş	Powerful crime lord originally from Adana. Charismatic and unpredictable, he is the head of a drug trafficking mafia in Istanbul who forms an alliance with Yücel, Efsun, Timsah, and Akın against the Koçovalı family to avenge his brother Savaş's death. However, he later falls deeply in love with Karaca, but is tragically murdered by her on their wedding night.
Kadir Çermik	Mücahit Savcıbey (Emmi)	Longtime and loyal friend of İdris and Paşa. One of the most respected elders in the Çukur neighborhood. Suffered from Alzheimer's after both of his lifetime friends died. Killed by Cumali Koçovalı Sr.
Çetin Sarıkartal	Cihangir Şahin (Paşa)	Longtime and loyal friend of İdris and Emmi. One of the most respected elders in the Çukur neighborhood. Runs the neighborhood's arms dealing business. Killed by the Karakuzular.
Nebil Sayın	Muhittin Derbent	The Çukur neighborhood's barber and longtime friend of İdris, Emmi, and Paşa. Meke's father. He saved Cumali 's life after İdris shot him. Killed by the Karakuzular.
Cem Uslu	Metin Yaman	One of Çukur's most loyal and trustworthy men. Bodyguard of the Koçovalı family. Kemal's older brother. He lost his left eye in the Karakuzular raid.
Uğur Yıldıran	Kemal Yaman	Metin's younger brother and one of Çukur's most loyal and trustworthy men. Bodyguard of the Koçovalı family. He sacrificed himself to protect Yamaç and was killed by Azer Kurtuluş.
Aytaç Uşun	Mustafa Derbent (Meke)	One of Çukur's most loyal and trustworthy men. Muhittin's son, who inherited the barbershop after his father's death. Celasun's best friend. Fell in love with Fidan and ended up marrying her.
Kubilay Aka	Celasun Gümüş	One of Çukur's most loyal and trustworthy men. Became one of Vartolu's men to secretly avenge his father's death, but later reconciled with him. Fell in love with Akşin and married her. Later fell in love with Karaca. Killed by the Masked Man at Cumali Koçovalı Sr's order.
Mustafa Kırantepe	Medet İnce	Vartolu's right-hand man and longtime friend. He suffered from lung problems after being shot in the Karakuzular raid. Fell in love with Cennet. He was on bad terms with Salih after Cumali Koçovalı Sr. took over the neighborhood, but later reconciled with him.
Ferit Kaya	Murtaza Surlu (Feri)	Arms dealer who is Paşa's former apprentice. Came as an enemy to the Koçovalı family and worked for Azer and the Erdenet family. Fell in love with Ayşe and married her. Later became Vartolu's right-hand man and even saved Yamaç's life. He committed suicide after Ayşe was killed.
Hare Sürel	Damla Koçovalı	Uluç's daughter and Cumali's wife. Mother of Asiye. Brave woman who helps the Koçovalı family in difficult situations.
Ece Yaşar	Karaca Koçovalı	Selim and Ayşe's daughter. Akın's younger sister. She is a mature and strong-willed girl who feels neglected. She falls deeply in love with Azer Kurtuluş and marries him, but is forced by his grandmother Sultan to kill him on their wedding night. Later, she becomes Celasun's lover. She is killed by Cumali Koçovalı Sr. after confronting him about Celasun's death.
İrem Altuğ	Ayşe Yılmaz	Selim's ex-wife and mother of Akın and Karaca. Later married Murtaza. She owns a beauty salon. She doesn't have a good relationship with her daughter and keeps rejecting to connect with her emotionally throughout. Ironically, she is the first person who senses why her daughter is killed and has a total meltdown. She is killed by Şahram while trying to avenge her daughter.
Boncuk Yılmaz	Saadet Koçovalı	The Koçovalı family's housekeeper who was raised in their house. She is treated as a daughter by İdris Koçovalı and is a pure-hearted and supportive figure for the family. She shares a deep love with his childhood friend Salih, whom she eventually marries and has a kid with named İdris Jr.
İlayda Alişan	Akşin Koçovalı (Akkız)	Kahraman and Nedret's daughter. Acar's older sister. A sweet and innocent girl, she falls in love with Celasun and marries him. However, their wedding is ambushed by the Karakuzular, injuring her face and killing her mother and brother. She experiences severe psychological trauma as a result of this. She is killed by Yücel who gives her a fatal drug overdose.
Hazal Subaşı	Nehir Bursalı	Yamaç's former lover and friend whom he met in a mental asylum. Has a son named Yamaç Jr from Yamaç. Entrusted his son to Efsun's care after she was diagnosed with cancer.
Gamze Doğanoğlu	Yasmin Koçovalı	İskender's sister and Akın's wife. Suffers from psychological problems because of the war in her home country Afghanistan.
Zeynep Kumral	Nedret Koçovalı	Kahraman's wife and mother of Akşin and Acar. Killed by the Karakuzular.
Şenay Gürler	Meliha Sancaklı	İdris Koçovalı's former lover and former singer in the Istanbul nightclubs. İdris thought her to be dead after he shot her, but she was saved by Paşa and Sultan.
Gamze Dar	Mihriban Helvacı (Gonca)	İdris Koçovalı's former lover. Salih's mother. She met İdris while working in a bar and had a romance with him, resulting in her pregnancy with Salih. While İdris was in prison, she begged Sultan to look after her son and let him grow up alongside his father, but Sultan refused and she was forced by Paşa to marry Kasım, İdris' chauffeur. Killed by Kasım Helvacı.
Nur Sürer	Fadik Kurtuluş	Mother of Azer Kurtuluş and his 8 siblings. Leaves Istanbul in a mad state after all his sons are killed.
Salih Kalyon	Yavuz Çoban	Aliço's father. Retired commander and soldier, who forces Aliço to live a military life. Killed by his own son Zafer.
İlkay Akdağlı	Nedim	Cumali Koçovalı Sr's right-hand man. Worked as a spy amongst the Koçovalı family while pretending to be a waiter at the Çukur coffeeshop. Killed by Salih.
Genco Özak	Kulkan Erdenet	Cengiz Erdenet's youngest son with Süreyya. Unpredictable and sadistic, he initially helps his father and half-brother Çağatay in the war against Çukur, but later betrays them. With the help of Cumali Koçovalı Sr., he tortures Yamaç for 3 years in a cave to avenge his brother Ogeday's death. He is shot and killed by Efsun after being thrown from a rooftop.
Baki Davrak	Ogeday Erdenet	Cengiz Erdenet's oldest son with Süreyya. Supervised the Erdenet holding and his father's legal work. Killed by his own brother Kulkan in a trap set by Yamaç, Cumali, and Akın.
İrem Sak	Seren Erdenet	Cengiz Erdenet's niece and cousin of Ogeday, Çağatay, Arık, and Kulkan. Helped Arık in the war against Çukur. Killed both Olga and Süreyya to avenge her father's death. Killed by Çağatay Erdenet.
Suna Yıldızoğlu	Olga Erdenet	One of Cengiz Erdenet's wives and mother of Çağatay and Arık Böke. Russian woman who controls all of Cengiz's money that comes from his drug business. Killed by Seren.
Filiz Taçbaş	Süreyya Erdenet	One of Cengiz Erdenet's wives and mother of Ogeday and Kulkan. Killed by Seren.
Meral Çetinkaya	Makbule Kent	Baykal's mother and grandmother of Nazım, Emrah, and Efsun. Killed by Efsun.
Ahmet Tansu Taşanlar	Nazım Kent	Lawyer who is Baykal's son and Emrah and Efsun's half-brother. Enemy of Çukur and the Koçovalı family. Caused Baykal's death by surrendering him to the Russian mafia. Took over the neighborhood with the help of Emrah, Vartolu, and Selim. Killed by his own brother Emrah.
Alperen Duymaz	Emrah Kent	Former police chief and Baykal's son from Güzide. Sena's half-brother. Enemy of Çukur and the Koçovalı family. Took over the neighborhood with the help of Nazım, Vartolu, and Selim. Killed by his own brother Nazım.
Mehmet Yılmaz Ak	Ersoy	An accountant who is a main member of the Karakuzular. He joined the Karakuzular after Çeto and Mahsun saved him from high school bullies. Later, he betrayed them after finding out about Çeto selling organs of the deceased Karakuzular members and started helping Yamaç. Killed by Çeto.
Ramin Nazir	Lal Fındık	Small mute man who is a main member of the Karakuzular. He is one of Çeto's most trusted men and runs his secret business of selling organs of the deceased Karakuzular members. He tried kidnapping İdris Jr, but was shot and killed by Selim.
Meli Bendeli	Celil (Timsah)	A crime lord in Istanbul. Enemy of Çukur and the Koçovalı family. Helped Yücel in his plan to kill İdris Koçovalı to avenge his friend Sedat. Killed by Salih.
Serhat Özcan	Uluç (Reis)	Damla's father and İdris and Emmi's friend. One of the respected elders of the Istanbul mafia who owns a shipbuilding factory. Works secretly with Yücel against the Koçovalı family to take over Çukur. Killed by Yücel.
Sarp Akkaya	Şahram Göçer	Leader of a motorcycle mafia gang from Afghanistan. He was Cumali Koçovalı Sr's ally who saw him as a son. Enemy of Çukur and the Koçovalı family. Attacked and took over the neighborhood at the request of Cumali Koçovalı Sr. Killed by Yamaç, Cumali, Salih, and Akın.
Emrullah Çakay	Fatih	Çağatay Erdenet's servant and right-hand man. He smuggled drugs into the Çukur neighborhood at Çağatay's order. Killed by Yamaç.
Çağrı Atakan	Remzi	Resident of the Çukur neighborhood who is an enemy of the Koçovalı family. Worked for Çukur's enemies to take revenge from the Koçovalı family.
Erman Cihan	Şenol	Arms dealer from Karadeniz who did business with the Koçovalı family and became Yamaç's close friend. Killed by Murtaza at Çağatay Erdenet's order.
Elif Doğan	Hale	Journalist, who physically resembled Meliha in her youth. She became Meliha's friend and interviewed İdris Koçovalı at her request. Fell in love with Aliço. Killed by Laz at Baykal's order.

== Soundtracks ==
No.	Title	Length
1.	"Çukur Jenerik Müziği – Toygar Işıklı"	1:36
2.	"Git (Sezen Aksu)"	5:06
3.	"Bu kız (Son Feci Bisiklet)"	2:56
4.	"Gamzendeki Çukur (Kubilay Aka & Hayko Cepkin)"	3:25
5.	"Yamaç & Sena (Çukur)"	4:59
6.	"Yaşamak İstemem (Yavuz Çetin)"	5:33
7.	"Dinek Dağı (Neşet Ertaş)"	4:05
8.	"Gömün Beni Çukur'a (Eypio)"	3:18
9.	"Mihriban (Musa Eroğlu)"	4:21
10.	"Yaş Elli (Replikas)"	3:08
11.	"Zalım (Ceylan Ertem)"	4:28
12.	"Heyecanı Yok (Gazapizm)"	4:12
13.	"Kalbim Çukurda (Cem Adrian & Gazapizm)"	4:31
14.	"Hiç Işık Yok (Melek Mosso & No.1)"	5:10
15.	"Derindeyim – (MRF)"	3:36
16.	"Beni Siz Delirttiniz – (Cem Karaca)"	3:02
17.	"Keklik Gibi (Melek Mosso)"	4:46
18.	"Talihim Yok Bahtım Kara (Zeynep Bakşi Karatağ)"	4:53
19.	"Nefes Bile Almadan (Redd)"	4:48
20.	"Çukur'un Dibi (Toygar Işıklı)"	1:23
21.	"Zombi Mahali (Adamlar)"	3:53
22.	"Dur (Arın Aykut & Spunk)"	3:22
23.	"Yemin Ederim (Heja & Şam)"	3:01
24.	"Nere Gitsen Çukur Orda (Toygar Işıklı & Çukurspor)"	3:37
25.	"Cemalim (Erkin Koray)"	5:58
26.	"Akrebin Gözleri (Erkin Koray)"	7:05
27.	"Nefes Al (Kadir Çermik & Saki)"	3:45
28.	"Kısır Döngü (Allame)"	2:53
29.	"Çatapat (Tahribad-ı İsyan & Saki)"	2:00
30.	"Kefen Giydim (Pinhani)"	3:26
31.	"Ya Sidi (Orange Blossom)"	4:35
32.	"Nereden Bileceksiniz (Ahmet Kaya)"	4:46
33.	"Alla Beni Pulla Beni (Barış Manço)"	2:50
34.	"Kum Gibi (Çukur Canlı Performans) (Cem Adrian)"	5:00
35.	"Mahsun (Bumerang) (Çukur)"	1:27
36.	"Karakuzular (Çukur)"	1:21
37.	"Vartolu (Çukur)"	1:53
38.	"Yamaç'ın İntikamı (Çukur)"	2.15
39.	"Unutulacak Dünler (Gazapizm)"	4:55
40.	"Ich Bin Çukur (Eko Fresh & Heja)"	2:30
41.	"Bıçak Sırtı (Toygar Işıklı)"	1:52
42.	"Cumali (Çukur)"	1:52
43.	"Aliço (Çukur)"	1:52
44.	"Habanera (Carmen)"	4:28
45.	"Yoruldum (Adamlar)"	4:33
46.	"Savaş Yeni Başlıyor (Bağlama Versiyon)"	1:35
47.	"Çağatay Erdenet (Çukur)"	5.39
48.	"Arık Böke Erdenet (Çukur)"	3.53
49.	"Nedim (Çukur)"	1.28
50.	"Cengiz Erdenet (Çukur)"	2.57
51.	"Ögeday Erdenet (Çukur)"	3.24
52.	"Seren Erdenet 'Nimet' (Didomido & Eglo G)"	2.16
53.	"Sen Affetsen Ben Affetmem (Fairuz Derin Bulut)"	4:35
54.	"Ay Karanlık (Cem Karaca)"	3.07
55.	"Kanadım Değdi Sevdaya (Burcu Güneş)"	4.52
56.	"Darıldım (Aşık Mahzuni Şerif)"	3:30
57.	"Pisliğin Üstüne Basmışlar (Gazapizm)"	3.22
58.	"Sarı Çizmeli Mehmet Ağa (Barış Manço)"	3.54
59.	"Eski Libas Gibi (Öner Erkan)"	3.57
60.	"Çukur'dan Kaçış Yok (Fuat Ergin & Toygar Işıklı)"	3.33
61.	"Garipler (Müslüm Gürses)"	6.45
62.	"Garipler (Pera)"	5.33
63.	"Ayrılık Acı Bir Şey (Müslüm Gürses)"	4.30
64.	"İyi Değilim (Azer Bülbül)"	4.54
65.	"Mican (Duble Salih)"	4.20
66.	"Rest (Gönder Gelsin) (Ramiz Bayraktar)"	2.37
67.	"Adaletin Bu Mu Dünya? (Zeynep Bakşi Karatağ)"	3.43
68.	"El Değmesin (Gökhan Güney)"	2.08
69.	"Yaşamak İstemem (Yavuz Çetin)"	5.50
70.	"Halime'm (Zara, Orhan Hakalmaz, Erol Köker, Zeynep Atagür, Elvan Erbaşı)"	3.46
71.	"Delalım (Akif Çekirge)"	4.41
72.	"Elinden Geleni Ardına Koyma (Devran Çağlar)"	5.23
73.	"Türk Marşı (Ceza)"	2.02
74.	"Küçük Sevgilim (Mor ve Ötesi)"	4.13
75.	"Odam Kireç Tutmuyor (Cem Karaca)"	4.35
76.	"Ela Gözlüm (Cem Adrian)"	4.02
77.	"Ruhumda Sızı (Ender Balkır)"	6.02
78.	"Sen Gel Diyorsun (Öf Öf) (Cem Adrian)"	6.02
79.	"Ayrılık Hasreti (Seyfi Yerlikaya & Özge Öz Erdoğan)"	4.16
80.	"Bir Ay Doğar (Cengiz Özkan)"	4.31
81.	"Akşam Olur Karanlığa Kalırsın (Nida Ateş)"	7.00
82.	"Nice Nice Yıllara (Selda Bağcan)"	5.11
83.	"Yalan Dünya (Zeynep Bakşi Karatağ)"	3.31
84.	"Haberin Yok Ölüyorum (Duman)"	6.02
85.	"Soran Yok Bilen Yok (Mazlum Çimen)"	3.58
86.	"Durdurun Dünyayı (Damla Sönmez)"	4.41
87.	"Sığmazam (Cavit Murtezaoğlu)"	6.24
88.	"Su Ver Leylam (Damla Sönmez)"	2.21
89.	"Sen Affetsen Ben Affetmem (Damla Sönmez)"
90.	"Son Mektup (Damla Sönmez)"
91.	"Sorma Ne Haldeyim (Damla Sönmez)"
92.	"Bu Sokaklar Acıya Kardeş olur (Toygar Işıklı & Kubilay Aka)"	3.16
93.	"Islak Islak (Barış Akarsu)"	4.43
94.	"Nefes Al (Kadir Çermik)"	4.00
95.	"Bu Son Olsun (Cem Karaca)"	2.49
96.	"Savaşın İçindeyim (Toygar Işıklı & Kamufle)"	3.00

== Series overview ==
Series	Episodes	Originally released	
Series	Episodes	First released	Last released
1	33	23 October 2017	11 June 2018
2	34	17 September 2018	27 May 2019
3	25	16 September 2019	16 March 2020
4	39	7 September 2020	7 June 2021

== International broadcasting ==
- Iran on Gem TV since 2019 as Persian: گودال, romanized: Godal. Dubbed to Persian.
- Ethiopia on Kana TV since 2019 as Amharic: የኛ ሰፈር, romanized: jɛɲä sɛfɛr.
- Arab world on beIN Drama since 2019 as Arabic: الحفرة, romanized: al-Hufra. Dubbed to Arabic.
- South Africa in Eextra since 2022 as Die Put.
- Bosnia and Herzegovina on Nova BH since 2022 as Jama.
- Serbia on Nova S since 2021 as Jama (Only season 1).
- Albania on TV Klan since November 2022.
- Romania on Happy Channel since January 9, 2019 as Legea Familiei.

== Bookmaking ==
Gökhan Horzum, the screenwriter of the series, published a book about the first season of the series called Yamaç's Return - Çukur in October 2019. The cover design of the book was made by Serçin Çabuk and Banu Üstündağ Hatip.

== Reviews ==
Çukur has a story that reduces the neighborhood to a bad image (pit), unlike the Turkish TV series of the 2000s that deal with the neighborhood culture. Nurdan Gürbilek commented on "family, masculinity and the mafia series" by devoting a separate section to the line in his work titled Second Life. In the series, first the hero leaves the house and then returns to the threatened neighborhood as a savior. Gürbilek interprets this as a classic return story and evaluates it as a popular version of the "man returning home" narrative. According to him, the music of the TV series (mainly the songs of Gazapizm and Eypio) that integrates with the scenes of violence are rap pieces that have been converted into close combat music. In the series, the name of the struggle of the heirs (self and stepchildren) created by the father's image and the fall of the father is "brothers' fight". On the other hand, those under the command of Baba (Idris et al.) and the neighborhood leader (Yamaç et al.), who stand out as the saviors and protectors of the poor (neighbourhood), are "fatherless children". According to Gürbilek, the neighborhood is seen as a "liberated space" and the reality of despair connects people to the order of fatherhood and masculinity (neighborhood).

=== Complaints ===
Since its publication, Çukur has been among the most complained about works on TV. Due to scenes of armed conflict, fear, violence and torture, RTÜK imposed an administrative fine on the channel on which the TV series was broadcast. Ercan Kesal, who took part in the increasing complaints for two seasons in Çukur, replied, "When you compare the violence issue in Çukur with the violence in daily life, it is much more innocent."

== Symbol ==
The emblem of this series—and of the Çukur neighborhood—is ᑅ ᐧ ᑀ. This symbol is closely tied to both the Çukur community and the Koçovalı family. It is etched not only onto the bodies of Çukur's residents but also onto the walls throughout the area.

Its design is composed of five main elements: an upward-pointing chevron, three vertically aligned dots beneath it, and a downward-pointing chevron at the base. Each part of the symbol conveys a specific message:

- Upward chevron (roof of the home): This element symbolizes the roof over one’s head. In times of crisis, a person can come to Çukur, knock on any door, reveal their tattoo, and the household will welcome them as one of their own. The roof becomes theirs, offering protection and refuge.
- First dot (immediate family): The topmost dot stands for the loved ones within the home—parents, siblings, spouse, and children. These are the people one is duty-bound to guard and support.
- Second dot (chosen family): The middle dot signifies friends, companions, and neighbors—the extended family one chooses. Bonds here run deep; they would take a bullet for you, and you for them.
- Third dot (the Koçovalı family): The bottom dot represents the larger family unit—the Koçovalı family. By bearing the tattoo, a person is embraced by the Koçovalı family, receiving their care, protection, and trust. In return, loyalty, love, and respect are expected. In times of trouble, the Koçovalıs will defend Çukur, and Çukur, in turn, will stand by the Koçovalıs.
- Downward chevron (the Pit): This final element signifies Çukur itself—the pit. It is a safe haven, a nest, a place to return to.

Together, these elements express that as long as there’s a roof above, a pit below, and family in between, death holds no power over us. Once someone receives this tattoo, even if they one day leave Çukur, Çukur remains a part of them forever.

== See also ==
- İçerde
- Üç Kuruş
