= Alev Alev (TV series) =

Turkish television series

- Also known as: Flames of Fate
- Genre: Drama
- Based on: Le Bazar de la Charité
- Screenplay by: Burcu Görgün Toptaş; Damla Serim
- Directed by: Ahmet Katıksız; Ufuk Hakan Eren; Özgür Sevimli
- Starring: Demet Evgar; Hazar Ergüçlü; Dilan Çiçek Deniz
- Composer: Toygar Işıklı
- Country of origin: Turkey
- Original language: Turkish
- No. of seasons: 1
- No. of episodes: 28

Production
- Producer: Kerem Çatay
- Running time: 130
- Production company: Ay Yapım

Original release
- Network: Show TV
- Release: November 5, 2020 – May 27, 2021

Alev Alev ('Bright Fire', lit. 'Fire Fire') is a Turkish drama television series directed by Ahmet Katıksız and written by Burcu Görgün Toptaş and Damla Serim. Alev Alev premiered on Show TV on November 5, 2020, and is a remake of the 2019 French miniseries Le Bazar de la Charité. starring Demet Evgar, Dilan Çiçek Deniz and Hazar Ergüçlü in the lead roles.

== Plot ==
The series tells the story of three women - Cemre, Rüya and Çiçek - whose lives change after a fire breaks out during a charity party, but with more focus on the life of Cemre, who is married to Çelebi Kayabeyli, the former mayor, she is subjected to violence and injustice, and her husband claims that she is mentally ill, and that she has tried to commit suicide. And he uses his clout to prevent the lawyers from taking over the divorce case that she wants to file against him, as well as threatening to take her child out of the country if she is not silent on her rights.

== Cast ==
- Demet Evgar as Cemre Akınsel
- Dilan Çiçek Deniz as Rüya Yıldırımlar Atayci
- Hazar Ergüçlü as Çiçek Görgülü
- Zuhal Olcay as Tomris Üstünoğlu
- Berkay Ateş as Ozan Akınsel
- Cihangir Ceyhan as Ömer Ataycı
- Cem Bender as Çelebi Kayabeyli
- Berker Güven as İskender Kayabeyli
- Yiğit Sertdemir as Police Commissioner Korkut Toprakoğlu
- Toprak Can Adigüzel as Ali
- Meltem Keskin as Seher Akınsel
- Tayfun Erarslan as Kenan Yıldırımlar
- Sekvan Serinkaya as Adnan
- Kayra Orta as Güneş
- Kaan Şener as Atlas
- Cem Sürgit as Bülent
- Fatih Çetinbaş as Taner Güvenbağ
- Veda Yurtsever as Hanım
- Bülent Düzgünoğlu as Hikmet
- Gökşen Ateş as Arzu
- Bedia Ener as İsmet
- Sahra Şaş as Zeyno
- Bora Cengiz as Serkan
