= Feyyaz Duman =

Turkish actor

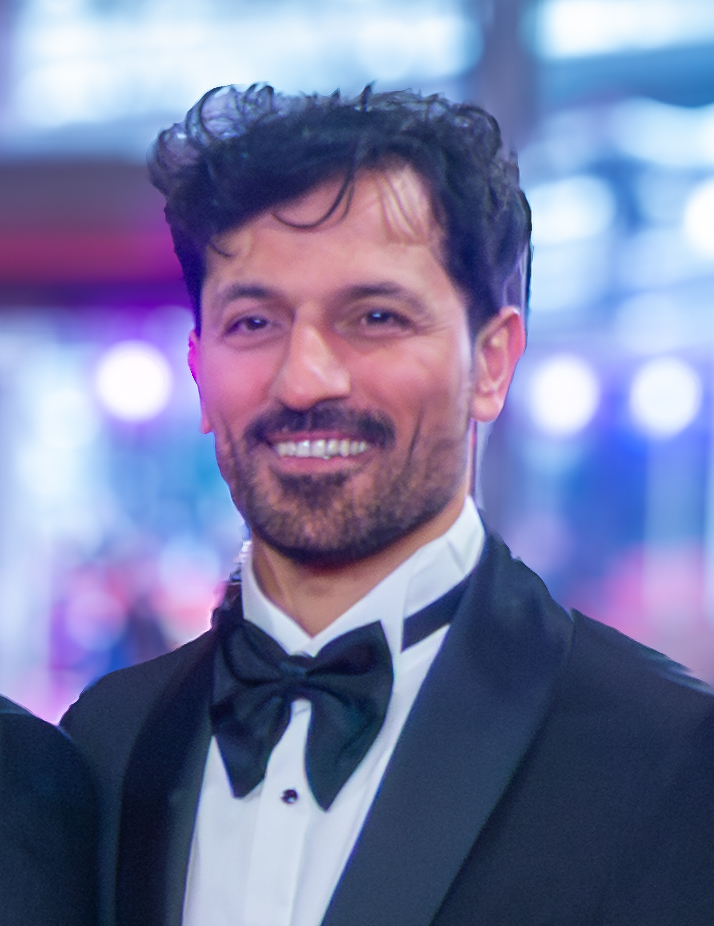
- Duman at the 76th Berlin International Film Festival in 2026
- Born: 15 June 1982 (age 44); Mardin, Turkey
- Occupation: Actor
- Years active: 2001–present
- Spouse: Zozan Şimşek (m. 2019)
- Children: 1

Feyyaz Duman (born 15 June 1982) is a Turkish actor of Kurdish descent. Duman was born in 1982 in Mardin. He is a graduate of Istanbul Technical University State Conservatory with a degree in folk dance studies. He then moved to New York to take acting lessons and returned to Turkey after 5 years. With his role in the movie Annemin Şarkısı, he won the Best Actor award at the 51st International Golden Orange Film Festival. He made his television debut in 2016 with a recurring role in İçerde. His breakthrough came with his portrayal of the character Arif in Fox drama series Kadın.

== Filmography ==
=== Television ===
Year	Title	Role	Note
2017	İçerde	Serkan	Supporting role
2017–2020	Kadın	Arif Kara	Leading role
2020–2021	Baraj	Nazım Güney	Leading role
2021	Yalancılar ve Mumları	Yakup Boztürk	Leading role
2022	Oğlum	Tuğrul Kaya	Leading role
2023	Adım Farah	Behnam Azadi	Supporting role
2024	Yalan	Kadir Karaca	Leading role
2026	Altı Üstü İstanbul	Tarık Dirlik	Leading role

=== Film ===
Year	Title	Role
2001	Fotoğraf	Faruk
2001	Büyük Adam Küçük Aşk	Garson
2011	Si Tu Meurs, Je Te Tue	Azad
2013	My Sweet Pepper Land	Jaffar Mohammed Emin
2014	Mardan	Morad
2014	Annemin Şarkısı	Ali
2017	Zagros	Zagros
2017	Never Leave Me	Adil
2018	Zor Bir Karar	Nezir
2020	Kovan	İlker
2023	Seni Görüyorum	Kaan
2025	Like a Limbless Tree	İhsan
2026	Salvation	Ferit

== Awards ==
- Sarajevo Film Festival - Best Actor (2014)
- 51st Golden Orange Film Festival - Best Actor (2014)
- Duhok International Film Festival - Best Actor (2015)
