= Kayıp Çocuk Masalları =

Studio album by Cem Adrian
- Released: December 21, 2010
- Genre: Alternative
- Length: 47:07
- Label: UJR Productions
- Producer: Cem Adrian

Cem Adrian chronology
Emir (2008)	Kayıp Çocuk Masalları (2010)	Siyah Bir Veda Öpücüğü (2012)

Kayıp Çocuk Masalları (Missing Children's Tales) is a 2010 Turkish studio album by Cem Adrian.

== Background ==
The album is Adrian's 5th alternative rock music studio album after Emir which was released 2.5 years prior.

== Track listing ==
No.	Title	Writer(s)	Producer(s)	Length
1.	"Kayıp"	Cem Adrian	Cem Adrian
2.	"Bir Katilin Ellerinde"	Cem Adrian	Cem Adrian
3.	"Sen Benim"	Cem Adrian	Cem Adrian
4.	"Bana Ne Yaptın"	Cem Adrian	Cem Adrian
5.	"Herkes Gider mi"	Cem Adrian	Cem Adrian
6.	"Unutursun"	Cem Adrian	Cem Adrian
7.	"Ağladıkça"	Cem Adrian	Cem Adrian
8.	"O Kirpik Hala Bende Sevgilim"	Cem Adrian	Cem Adrian
9.	"Islak Kelebek"	Can Tanrıyar	Can Tanrıyar
10.	"Yarım"	Cem Adrian	Cem Adrian
11.	"Benden Sonra"	Cem Adrian	Cem Adrian
12.	"Tanrı Aslında Sever Hepimizi"	Cem Adrian	Cem Adrian
Total length:				47:07

== Production ==
- Words, music, vocals, arranging: Cem Adrian
- Guest artists: Aylin Aslım, Murat Yılmazyıldırım
- Album cover: Boğaç Dalkıran
