= Cihangir Ceyhan =

Turkish actor

- Born: 6 February 1989 (age 37); Adana, Turkey
- Education: Anadolu University
- Occupation: Actor
- Years active: 2016–present
- Spouse: Fatma Funda Kurt (m. 2019)
- Children: 1

Cihangir Ceyhan (born 6 February 1989) is a Turkish television and film actor. He is famously known for having played in Sıfır Bir and Çukur.

== Personal life ==
Ceyhan was born in Adana on 6 February 1989. The youngest child in the family, he is originally from Elazığ on his father's side and Diyarbakır on his mother's side. A graduate of Anadolu University's School of Business Administration, he studied acting in Istanbul for two and a half years. Following his training, he returned to his birthplace, Adana.

In 2019 he married Fatma Funda Kurt. The couple's son was born on 6 February 2020.

== Career ==
Ceyhan made his acting debut in 2015 with his role as Serdar in the movie Yusuf. Later, he rose to prominence with the character of Cio in the TV series Sıfır Bir, which was first broadcast on YouTube and then on BluTV between 2016 and 2019. Between 2019 and 2020, he appeared as Azer Kurtuluş in the TV series Çukur, which was broadcast on Show TV. This project marked his first appearance on a mainstream television series. He then played the character of Ömer Ataycı in the TV series Alev Alev, which was also broadcast on Show TV between 2020 and 2021.

Between 2021 and 2023, he portrayed the character Hayri Ersoy in the series Camdaki Kız, which aired on Kanal D. In 2024, he portrayed the character Ferit Kamacı in the series Dengeler: Biri Olmak, which aired on GAİN. That same year, he portrayed the title character Asaf in the series Asaf, which aired on Netflix. In 2025, he portrayed the character Ali Tuna in the series Bir Zamanlar İstanbul, which aired on TRT 1.

== Filmography ==
Television
Year	Title	Role	Notes	Network
2019–2020	Çukur	Azer Kurtuluş	Supporting role	Show TV
2020–2021	Alev Alev	Ömer Ataycı	Leading role	Show TV
2021–2023	Camdaki Kız	Hayri Ersoy	Leading role	Kanal D
2025	Bir Zamanlar İstanbul	Ali Tuna	Leading role	TRT 1
2026	Anne Yarısı	Ali Altay	Leading role	NOW
Web series
Year	Title	Role	Notes	Platform
2016–2018	Sıfır Bir	Cio / Cihangir	Leading role	YouTube / BluTV
2024	Dengeler: Biri Olmak	Ferit Kamacı	Leading role	GAİN
2024	Asaf	Asaf	Leading role	Netflix
2025	Yankı: Görünmez El	Eray	Leading role	tabii
Film
Year	Title	Role	Notes	
2015	Yusuf	Serdar	Supporting role	
2023	Güven Bana	Özcan	Leading role	
2024	Dengeler	Ferit Kamacı	Leading role	
2026	Fırtına Kız	İsmail	Leading role	

== Awards and nominations ==
Awards
Year	Award	Category	Work	Result	Reference
2022	48th Golden Butterfly Awards	Best TV Couple (with Burcu Biricik)	Camdaki Kız	Nominated	
