= Karadayı =

Turkish television drama series

- Written by: Eylem Canpolat; Sema Ergenekon
- Directed by: Uluç Bayraktar; Cem Karcı
- Starring: Kenan İmirzalıoğlu; Bergüzar Korel; Çetin Tekindor; Yurdaer Okur; Erkan Avcı; Melike İpek Yalova; Rıza Kocaoğlu; Atsız Karaduman; Erhan Yazıcıoğlu; Fatih Al; Funda Eryiğit; Uğur Aslan; Hüseyin Soyaslan; Sermet Yeşil; Civan Canova; Nihat Altınkaya
- Theme music composer: Toygar Işıklı
- Country of origin: Turkey
- Original language: Turkish
- No. of seasons: 3
- No. of episodes: 115

Production
- Producer: Kerem Çatay
- Running time: 130 minutes (average)
- Production company: Ay Yapım

Original release
- Network: ATV
- Release: 8 October 2012 – 15 June 2015

Karadayı (English: The Uncle Kara) is a Turkish television drama series produced by Ay Yapım and broadcast on ATV. It was directed by the duo Uluç Bayraktar & Cem Karcı (who were previously associated with the direction of globally acclaimed Turkish series Ezel (Note: Cem Karcı served as the second director in TV series Ezel.)). It originally aired on 8 October 2012 in Turkey. It stars Kenan İmirzalıoğlu as Mahir Kara and Bergüzar Korel as Feride Şadoğlu.

== Concept of Karadayı ==
The word "Karadayı" is a combination of the series' protagonist Mahir Kara's surname meaning 'black' and the Turkish word "dayı", which means "uncle" - specifically a mother's brother. Karadayı, meaning "black uncle" is how Mahir's nephew, Nazif Tiryaki, addresses his uncle. The word also resembles the Turkish word "kabadayı", which means gangster. After the death of Mahir's nephew and his decision to become an insider amongst the mafia in order to avenge his death, he refers to himself as "Karadayı" and this becomes his nickname in the mafia world.

== Synopsis ==
Mahir fights for justice. He wants to get his father, Nazif Kara, out of jail. While he joins the court of Istanbul as a trainee lawyer to fight his father's case, fate finds him taking its own course. He stands at a crossroads where he must choose between Feride, the judge of his father's case, and his father.

This fascinating story unfolds as it takes you back to the magical Istanbul of the 1970s with all its charm and mysticality. The city of Istanbul is beautifully portrayed to depict the historical splendor of the place and its enchanting people.

== Episodes ==
Season	Episodes	Originally released	
Season	Episodes	First released	Last released
1	36	8 October 2012	17 June 2013
2	39	9 September 2013	16 June 2014
3	40	15 September 2014	15 June 2015

== Critical appreciation ==
Oscar winner Hollywood star Russell Crowe, said that he is amazed by the Karadayı series. He said that he likes to follow it and that he's fallen in love with Bergüzar Korel. "She can do great things in Hollywood", he added.

== Cast ==
Actor	Characters	About
Kenan İmirzalıoğlu	Mahir Kara (Karadayı)	Nazif Kara's son from Kader Altun, who always valiantly struggles against injustice. Works as a fake trainee lawyer under the name Salih Ipek to rescue his father from being hanged. Falls in love with Feride and ends up marrying her. Father of Nazım Deniz.
Bergüzar Korel	Feride Şadoğlu	Judge at the Istanbul courthouse, who is in charge of Nazif Kara's case. Mehmet Saim and Kerime's daughter. Falls in love with Mahir without knowing that he's the son of Nazif Kara. Mother of Nazım Deniz.
Çetin Tekindor	Nazif Kara (Kibar)	Father of the Kara family, who has been framed and falsely convicted of murdering Chief Prosecutor Süleyman Yılmaz. He owns a shoe shop and wants Mahir and Orhan to stay away from the mafia world.
Yurdaer Okur	Turgut Akın (Yaver)	Prosecutor of the Istanbul courthouse, who is one of the heads of the smuggling mafia. He has a long time crush on Feride. Real murderer of Chief Prosecutor Süleyman Yılmaz. He was thought to be dead after Necdet strangled him, however he was rescued by Serdar and came back for revenge with a fake identity under the name Korkut Ölmez. Sentenced to death by the law and hanged.
Erkan Avcı	Necdet Güney (Barut)	Part of the smuggling mafia who owns the Yeditepe casino. Ayten's husband and Osman's older brother. Works for Turgut and Mehmet Saim. He used to be a part of Dalyan Rıza's gang, however he betrayed him and attacked the new market. Has a daughter from Süeda named Zeynep. Sentenced to lifetime imprisonment.
Melike İpek Yalova	Ayten Alev	Mahir's ex-fiancé. Necdet's wife. Singer of Turkish pop music. She raises Necdet's daughter Zeynep, while he is in prison.
Rıza Kocaoğlu	Yasin Ulutaş (Kibrit)	Mahir's friend, who is the commissioner of Istanbul's police. Falls in love with Songül. Ends up marrying Suna after Songül falls in love with Osman.
Atsız Karaduman	Dalyan Rıza	Nazif Kara's best friend, who is one of the heads of the Istanbul mafia. Killed by Turgut's men while trying to protect Orhan.
Erhan Yazıcıoğlu	Mehmet Saim Şadoğlu (Beyefendi)	Feride's father, who is a powerful minister. He secretly heads a smuggling mafia under the alias "Beyefendi" and wants Feride to stay away from Mahir. He kills Mahir's stepmother and nephew in order to prevent his marriage with Feride. Killed by Turgut.
Fatih Al	Sosyete Yusuf	Gentleman of high society who is one of the heads of the Istanbul mafia. He owns several nightclubs and works for Mehmet Saim. Has a crush on Ayten and establishes her as a famous singer in Turkey. Killed by Mehmet Saim.
Funda Eryiğit	Belgin Türe	Smart woman who is one of the heads of Istanbul mafia and owns a beauty salon. Falls In love with Mahir. Her face was severely injured after Murat threw acid in her face. She commits suicide in prison after being sentenced to death.
Uğur Aslan	İsmail Gün (Seyis)	Ranch owner and stableman who is one of the heads of the Istanbul mafia. Falls in love with İlknur and marries her, however they divorce after İlknur learns he played a role in his son's death. Has a daughter from İlknur named Safiye. Sentenced to prison.
Hüseyin Soyaslan	Kütük Nail	One of the heads of the Istanbul mafia who owns a wood shop. He smuggles liquor and sells it to Istanbul nightclubs. His fingers were cut by Mahir after he kidnapped his father. Killed by Sosyete Yusuf.
Sermet Yeşil	Sarı Cemal	One of the heads of the Istanbul mafia who owns a brothel. Killed by Seyit Durak at Sosyete Yusuf's order.
Civan Canova	Çetin Hünkaroğlu (Cağaloğlu)	One of the heads of the smuggling mafia and Mehmet Saim's partner. He owns the Yurttaş newspaper agency. Escapes from Turkey after being exposed to the police by Mehmet Saim. Leaves his son Sinan in charge to take his revenge.
Nihat Altınkaya	Sinan Koca	Cetin's son, who runs the Yurttaş newspaper agency. Part of the smuggling mafia. Wants to marry Feride in order to take revenge from Mehmet Saim. Killed by Necdet at Mehmet Saim's order.
Ulaş Tuna Astepe	Orhan Kara	Mahir's half brother. Nazif and Safiye's son. Sentenced to prison after shooting Yasin. He becomes Seyis's right-hand man after being released from prison. Later reconciles with Mahir and becomes his right-hand man. Falls in love with Zehra and ends up marrying her.
Leyla Lydia Tuğutlu	Songül Kara	Mahir's half sister. Nazif and Safiye's daughter. Studies law at the university. First falls in love with Yasin, but later falls in love with Osman and ends up marrying him.
Elif Sönmez	İlknur Kara	Mahir's step sister. Safiye's daughter from her first marriage. Mother of Nazif Tiryaki and Safiye Gün. She was formerly married to Bülent. She falls in love with İsmail and marries him, however they later divorce. Ends up marrying Erdal.
Şebnem Dilligil	Safiye Kara	Nazif Kara's wife. Mahir's stepmother and mother of İlknur, Orhan, and Songül. Killed in a car explosion set off by Seyit Durak at Mehmet Saim's order.
Ataberk Mutlu	Nazif Tiryaki	Mahir's nephew. Son of İlknur & Bülent. He loves his grandfather Nazif and wants to be brave like his Uncle Mahir. Killed in a car explosion set off by Seyit Durak at Mehmet Saim's order.
Deniz Şen Hamzaoğlu	Bülent Tiryaki	Father of little Nazif and İlknur's ex-husband. He later becomes a part of Mahir's gang.
Perihan Erener	Zehra (Nilay)	Yılan Berdan's girlfriend from his brothel. Falls in love with Orhan and ends up marrying him.
Cenan Çamyurdu	Erdal Engin	Lawyer of the Kara family, who ends up marrying İlknur.
Emir Çubukçu	Osman Güney	Necdet's brother, who falls in love with Songül and ends up marrying her. He first works as an apprentice in Nazif Kara's shoe shop and studies law at the university, but later becomes part of Mahir's gang and his close follower. He returns to the university and after finishing his studies, becomes a judge.
Lila Gürmen	Kerime Şadoğlu	Mehmet Saim's wife. Feride, Melih, and Cihan's mother. She is supportive of Feride's relationship with Mahir. She learns about Mehmet Saim's involvement in the murder of Safiye and little Nazif, but keeps silent to protect her illegitimate son's life. Killed by Mehmet Saim.
Olgun Toker	Melih Şadoğlu	Feride's brother. Mehmet Saim and Kerime's son. Journalist who works for the Yurttaş newspaper agency. He commits suicide after leaking Mahir and Feride's relationship under Turgut's blackmailing threats and causing Feride to lose Nazif Kara's case.
İlkin Tüfekçi	Bahar Dündar (Çitlembik)	Feride's secretary in the courthouse. Mahir & Feride's close friend. Killed by Seyit Durak at Turgut's order.
Aslı Orcan	Serra Aşık	Clerk in the Istanbul courthosuse, who has an extramarital affair with Turgut and then marries him. She was part of Turgut's plan in framing Nazif Kara for the murder of Chief Prosecutor Süleyman Yılmaz. Killed by Turgut Akın in a staged car accident.
Irem Kayhaoglu	Suna Demir	Feride's secretary at the Istanbul courthouse and her best friend. Initially worked as a secret agent for the Supreme Court and caused Feride to lose Nazif Kara's case, but later reconciled with her. Falls in love with Yasin and ends up marrying Yasin.
Reha Özcan	Vehbi Duru	Istanbul's police chief who has an extramarital affair with Belgin. Killed by Seyit Durak at Mehmet Saim's order.
Şafak Karali	Selim Durmazel	Head of the Internal Affairs police and Mehmet Saim's undersecretary. Appointed as Istanbul's police chief after Vehbi's death. Killed By Belgin.
Kerem Firtina	Adnan Tok	Prosecutor at the Istanbul courthouse. Works for Mehmet Saim. He tries to frame and prosecute Mahir for multiple crimes. Sentenced to prison.
Mehmet Bozdoğan	Berdan Kiliç (Yılan)	Part of the smuggling mafia, who works for Turgut. He owns a brothel and kills his enemies with snakes. Wants to marry Nilay/Zehra. Killed by Belgin.
Cemil Büyükdöğerli	Hilmi Sucu (Boksör)	Former boxer who is part of the Istanbul mafia. He kidnaps children and uses them to make money. Sentenced to prison.
Başay Okay	Süreyya	Manager of Yılan Berdan and Sarı Cemal's brothels. She was fired by Sarı Cemal.
Yıldız Kültür	Kader/Nihan Altun	Mahir's real mother. Süleyman Yılmaz's mistress. Killed by Turgut's men in a staged fire.
Kübra Balcan	Mahperi Yılmaz	Mahir's half sister. Daughter of Chief Prosecutor Süleyman Yılmaz. Killed by Turgut's men in a staged fire.
Aydan Taş	Aysel	Belgin's secretary and assistant in her beauty salon. Killed by Turgut's men accidentally instead of Belgin.
Sema Öztürk	Süeda	Singer at the Yeditepe casino who has an affair with Necdet. Has a daughter from Necdet named Zeynep. Killed by Necdet.
Asu Ezgi Taşkıranoğlu	Nurten Alev	Ayten's younger sister. She leaves Istanbul to go live with her relatives in a country village.
Kadir Çermik	Geveze Ahmet	Part of the smuggling mafia, who works for Turgut. He loves to gamble. Killed by Turgut's men.
Özgür Emre Yildirim	Murat	Belgin's childhood friend from the orphanage who is in love with her and carries out her dirty work. He throws acid in Belgin's face after Belgin betrayed him. Killed by Belgin.
Cem Uslu	Seyit Durak	Hitman, who works for Turgut and Sosyete Yusuf. He placed the bomb in Mahir's car which led to the death of Safiye and Nazif. Killed by Mahir.
Diren Polatoğulları	İbrahim Durak (Ibo)	Necdet's childhood friend. He was part of the attack on the new market. Killed by Necdet.
Erkan Pekbay	Cihan	Kerime's illegitimate son from her ex-boyfriend. Feride's half brother. He was secretly kept alive by Mehmet Saim and used by him to threaten Kerime.
Ayhan Bozkurt	Suat	Turgut's right-hand man who carries out all his dirty work. Commits suicide in court at Turgut's order.
Ercan Reşat Demir	Rıza	Sinan's right-hand man who later betrayed him. Works for Mehmet Saim.
Ozan Ağaç	İsmet Ertekin	Mahir's neighbor and loyal friend, who owns a bakery.
Murat Mastan	Kemal	Policeman. Yasin's close friend.
Erdoğan Bilen	Tahsin	One of Sarı Cemal's former men who later becomes a part of Mahir's gang.
Melih Çardak	Serdar	Prison guard, who takes bribes. He rescued Turgut's life after Necdet tried to strangle him. Killed by Turgut Akın.
Oktay Gülbay	Süleyman Yılmaz	Chief Prosecutor of the Istanbul courthouse who was after the smuggling mafia. Nihan/Kader Altun's husband. Father of Mahperi. Killed by Turgut Akın.
Serkan Altintas	Yalçın	Mahir's neighbor, who owns a shop in the new market.
Çağdaş Tekelioğlu	Azmi	Apprentice in Nazif Kara's shoe shop.

== Awards ==
The major award (often dubbed as the Turkish Oscars), the Altın Kelebek (Golden Butterfly awards), Karadayi won it in 5 different categories. Karadayi also got nomination in International Emmy Awards, 2014. Along with the nominations of lead actors Kenan İmirzalıoğlu and Bergüzar Korel.

Year	Category	Nominee(s)	Result
Golden Butterfly Awards 2013	Best Drama Series	Karadayi	Won
Golden Butterfly Awards 2013	Best Actor	Kenan İmirzalıoğlu	Won
Golden Butterfly Awards 2013	Best Actress	Bergüzar Korel	Won
Golden Butterfly Awards 2013	Best Directors	Uluç Bayraktar & Cem Karci	Won
Golden Butterfly Awards 2014	Best Scenario	Eylem Canpolat & Sema Ergenekon	Won
Turkey Radio Awards 2012	Best Actress	Berguzar Korel	Won
Ayakli Gazete Awards 2013	Best Drama Actor	Kenan İmirzalıoğlu	Won
Ayakli Gazete Awards 2013	Best Drama Actress	Bergüzar Korel	Won
Ayakli Gazete Awards 2013	Best Series Of The Year	Karadayi	Won
Ayakli Gazete Awards 2013	Best Directors	Uluç Bayraktar & Cem Karci	Won
Ayakli Gazete Awards 2013	Best Negative Role Actor	Yurdaer Okur	Won
Ayakli Gazete Awards 2013	Best Supporting Actor	Rıza Kocaoğlu	Won
Ayakli Gazete Awards 2013	Best Supporting Actress	Melike İpek Yalova	Won
Magazine casusu 2013	Best Actress	Berguzar Korel	Won
Magazine casusu 2013	Best Actor	Kenan İmirzalıoğlu	Won
12. Magazinci.com Awards	Best TV Series	Karadayi	Won
4th Antalaya Awards 2013	Best Actor Of The Year	Kenan İmirzalıoğlu	Won
4th Antalaya Awards 2013	Best TV Series of the Season	Karadayi	Won
Golden Lion Awards 2013	Best TV Series	Karadayi	Won
Golden Lion Awards 2013	Best Actor	Kenan İmirzalıoğlu	Won
Golden Lion Awards 2013	Best Actress	Bergüzar Korel	Won
MGD.Altın Objektif Ödül Töreni 2013	Best Actor	Kenan İmirzalıoğlu	Won
Golden Lion Awards	Best Supporting Actor	Rıza Kocaoğlu	Won
Golden Lion Awards	Best Production Company	Ay Yapim	Won
Yerel Ve Bolgessel 2013	Best Actress	Berguzar Korel	Won
Yerel Ve Bolgessel 2013	Best Actor	Kenan İmirzalıoğlu	Won
Engelsiz Yasam Vakfi 2013	Best Actress	Berguzar Korel	Won
Quality Awards 2013	Best Actress	Berguzar Korel	Won
Quality Awards 2013	Best Actor	Kenan İmirzalıoğlu	Won
GQ Awards 2013	Man of the Year	Kenan İmirzalıoğlu	Won
RTGD - Medya Oscar	Best Actor	Kenan İmirzalıoğlu	Won
RTGD - Medya Oscar	Best Actress	Bergüzar Korel	Won
5.Ayaklı Gazete Awards	Best Period Drama Actor	Kenan İmirzalıoğlu	Won
5.Ayaklı Gazete Awards	Best Period Drama Actress	Bergüzar Korel	Won
5.Ayaklı Gazete Awards	Best Period Drama	Karadayi	Won
5.Ayaklı Gazete Awards	Best Scenario	Sema Ergenekon & Eylem Canpolat	Won
5.Ayaklı Gazete Awards	Best Period Drama Supporting Actor	Rıza Kocaoğlu	Won
5.Ayaklı Gazete Awards	Best Period Drama Supporting Actress	Melike İpek Yalova	Won
5.Ayaklı Gazete Awards	Best Directors	Uluç Bayraktar & Cem Karci	Won
MDG 21.Altın (Golden) Objektif Awards	Best Actor	Kenan İmirzalıoğlu	Won
MDG 21.Altın (Golden) Objektif Awards	Best Actress	Bergüzar Korel	Won
MDG 21.Altın (Golden) Objektif Awards	Best TV Series	Karadayi	Won
MDG 21.Altın (Golden) Objektif Awards	Best Performance	Funda Eryiğit	Won
11. iletişim ödülleri İstanbul Aydın Üniversitesi	Best Actor	Kenan İmirzalıoğlu	Won
Bilkent Television	Best Actress	Berguzar Korel	Won
Halic University 2014	Best Actress	Berguzar Korel	Won
Quality Magazine 2014	Best Actress	Berguzar Korel	Won
Yildiz Tenik University 2014	Best Actress	Berguzar Korel	Won
Yildiz Tenik University 2015	Best Actor	Kenan İmirzalıoğlu	Won
Bilkent Television Ödülleri	Best Actor	Kenan İmirzalıoğlu	Won
Engelsiz Yasam Vakfi 2013	Best Actor	Kenan İmirzalıoğlu	Won
Mersin Altın Palmiye Ödülleri 2015	Best Actor	Kenan İmirzalıoğlu	Won
