= Salvation (2026 film) =

- Turkish: Kurtuluş
- Directed by: Emin Alper
- Screenplay by: Emin Alper
- Produced by: Nadir Öperli
- Starring: Caner Cindoruk; Berkay Ateş; Feyyaz Duman; Naz Göktan; Özlem Taş; Eren Demir
- Cinematography: Ahmet Sesigürgil; Barış Aygen
- Edited by: Özcan Vardar
- Music by: Christiaan Verbeek
- Production companies: Liman Film; Bir Film; Meltem Films; TS Productions; Circe Films; Horsefly Films; Second Land
- Release date: 15 February 2026 (Berlinale)
- Running time: 120 minutes
- Countries: Turkey; France; Netherlands; Greece; Sweden; Saudi Arabia
- Languages: Turkish; Kurdish

Salvation (Turkish: Kurtuluş) is a 2026 drama film written and directed by Emin Alper. Starring Caner Cindoruk, Berkay Ateş, Feyyaz Duman and Naz Göktan.

The film had its world premiere at the main competition of the 76th Berlin International Film Festival on 15 February 2026, where it won the Silver Bear Grand Jury Prize.

== Cast ==
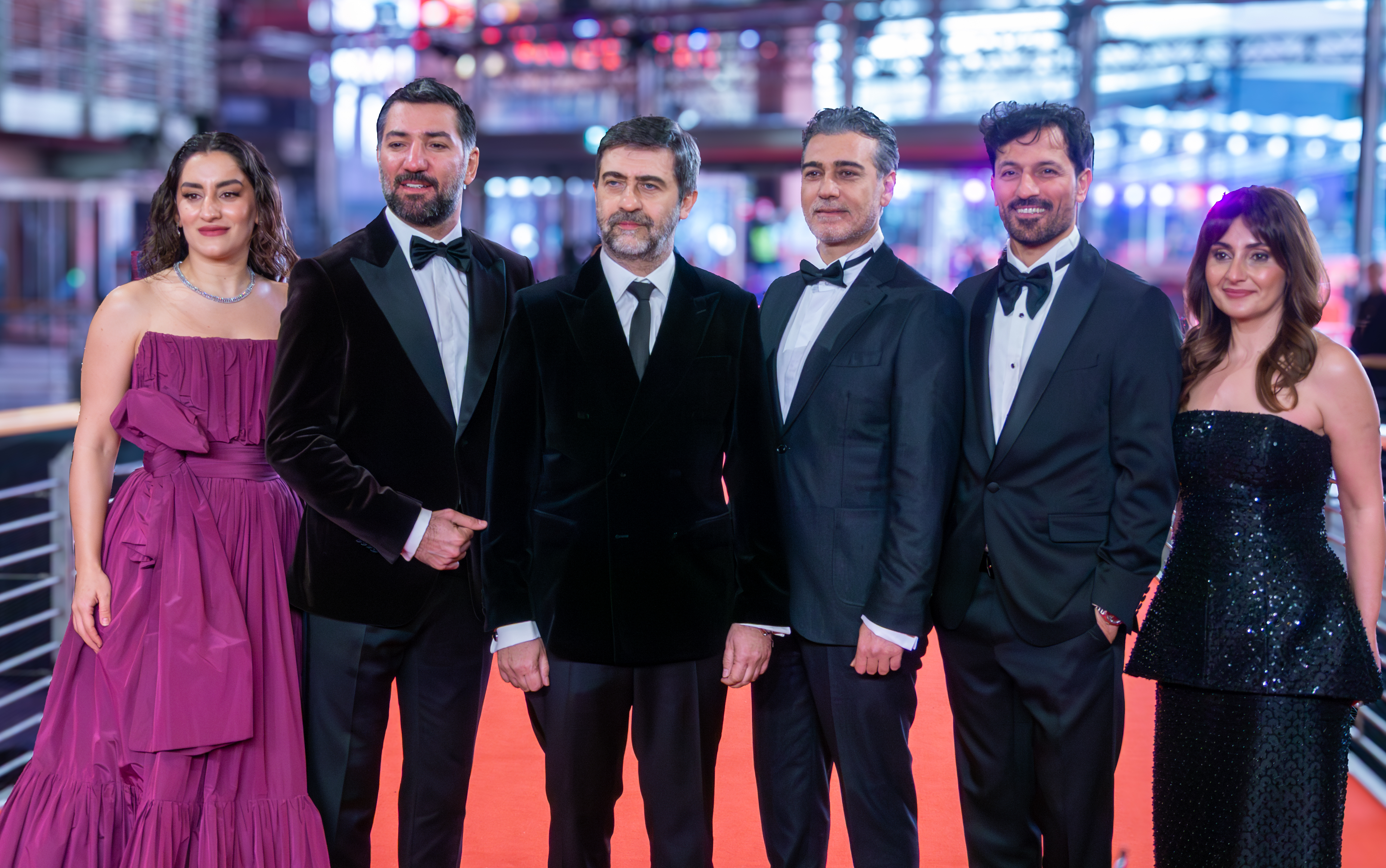
Cast and creew at the 76th Berlin International Film Festival

- Caner Cindoruk as Mesut
- Berkay Ateş as Yılmaz
- Feyyaz Duman as Ferit
- Naz Göktan as Fatma
- Özlem Taş as Gülsüm
- Eren Demir as Seyit

== Production ==
An international co-production between Turkey, France, The Netherlands, Greece, Sweden, and Saudi Arabia, director and writer Emin Alper made a Turkish-language drama film titled Salvation.

== Release ==
Salvation premiered at the 76th Berlin International Film Festival on 15 February 2026.
