= Hande Mehan =

Turkish musician and songwriter

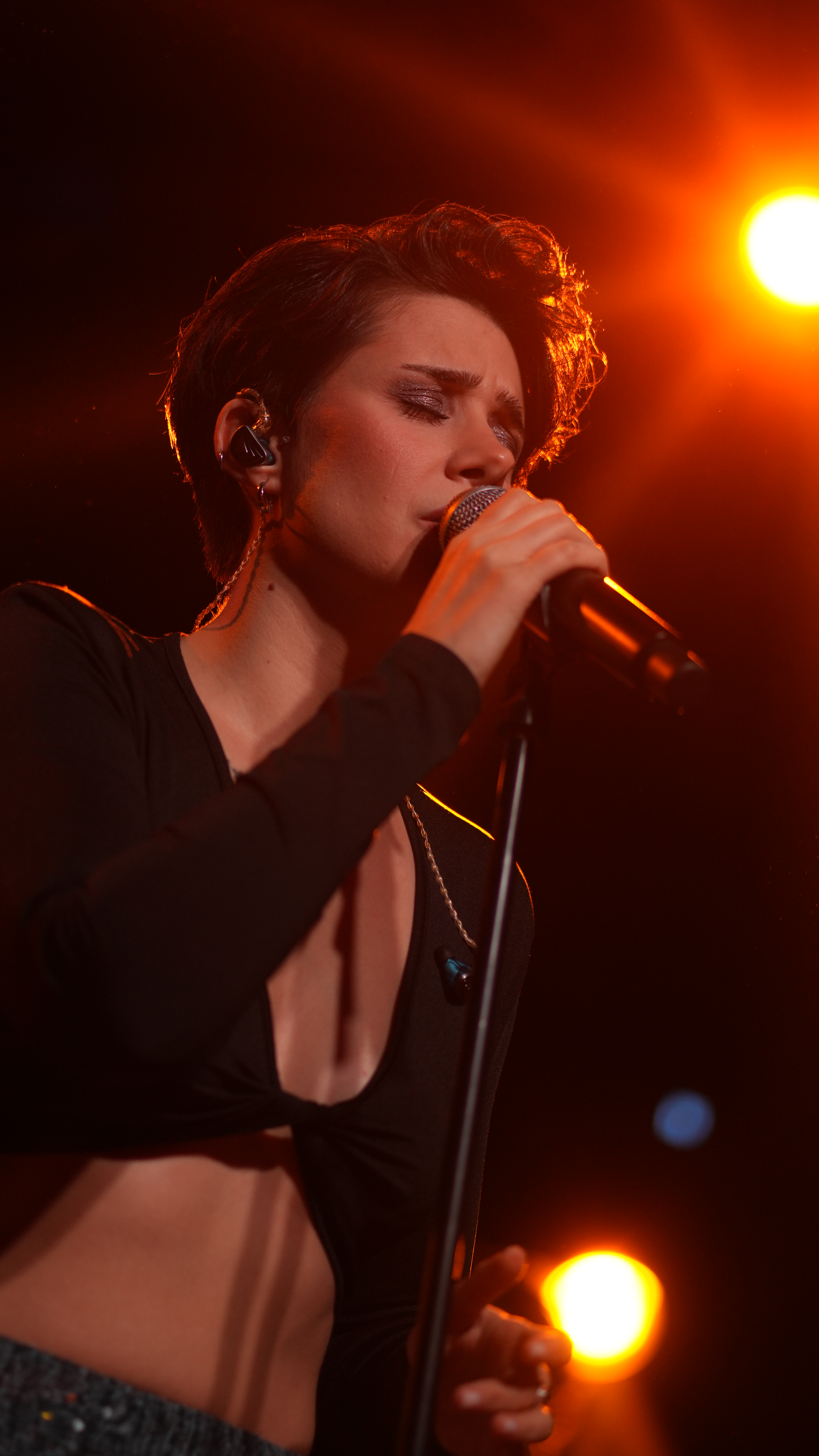
- Mehan in 2025

Background information
- Born: 22 December 1995 (age 29); Diyarbakır, Turkey
- Occupations: Musician; songwriter
- Years active: 2018–present
- Website: handemehan.com

Hande Mehan (born 22 December 1995) is a Turkish musician and songwriter. Mehan, who had become a producer for Cem Adrian after meeting him during her university years, started her own music career the song "Sen Beni Güzel Hatırla", which was written and composed by herself.

== Life ==
Mehan was born on 22 December 1995 in Diyarbakır. She officially started her music career on 17 May 2018 by releasing the song "Sen Beni Güzel Hatırla" on YouTube. Later, together with Cem Adrian, she voiced a cover version of İlhan Şeşen's song "Sen Benim Şarkılarımsın". Meanwhile, she started to make appearances as a guest artist during Cem Adrian's concerts.

In 2018, she performed at the Trakya Music Festival. She collaborated with Cem Adrian on a cover version of the song "Ah Bu Şarkıların Gözü Kör Olsun", which was included in the soundtrack of the movie Bizim İçin Şampiyon. The song was released as a single on 30 December 2018.

== Discography ==
Albums

- Yirmisekiz (2025)

EPs

- Acoustic Sessions I (2024)

Singles

- "Sen Beni Güzel Hatırla" (2018)
- "Benimle Yaşa" (2018)
- "Dudak Kenarı" (2018)
- "Adı Yok" (2018)
- "Kime Veda Ediyorsun?" (2018)
- "Bu Gece Benimle Kal" (feat. Bandtra) (2019)
- "Bir Yol Var" (2019)
- "Sessiz Boşluk" (2020)
- "Son Yürüyüş" (2020)
- "Yalan Değil" (2020)
- "Bir Kızıl Goncaya Benzer Dudağın" (2020)
- "Yalan Değil" (with Sezin Alkan) (2020)
- "Kırılsın Ellerim" (2021)
- "Dökül İçime" (2021)
- "Olamam" (2021)
- "Deniz Üstü Köpürür" (2021)
- "Unutursan" (2021)
- "Beni Böyle Sevme" (2022)
- "Mayıs" (with Mehmet Güreli) (2022)
- "Öyle Yalnız" (with Cem Adrian) (2022)
- "Sever Mi?" (with Mil Savior) (2022)
- "Adı Sarhoşluk" (2022)
- "Sevdim Seni Bir Kere" (with Cem Adrian) (2022)
- "Yalnızca Sitem" (with Taladro) (2022)
- "Zararını Seviyorum" (2022)
- "Kal Ya Da Git" (2023)
- "Bile Bile" (2023)
- "Aşacağız Zamanla" (2023)
- "Soluklan Dudaklarımda" (with Teoman) (2023)
- "Kimseye Etmem Şikayet" (2024)
- "Dermanım Yok" (2024)
- "Mühürledim Seni Kalbime (Bir Hadise Var)" (2024)
- "Ayrılmam" (2024)
- "Suzan Suzi" (2024)
- "Gurur" (2025)
- "Bir De Sen Gitme" (2025)
- "İki Kadın Bir Adam" (2025)

Featurings

- "Sen Benim Şarkılarımsın" (with Cem Adrian) (2018)
- "Ah Bu Şarkıların Gözü Kör Olsun" (with Cem Adrian) (2019)
- "Mesafeler" (with Hakan Tunçbilek) (2019)
- "Kum Gibi" (with Cem Adrian) (2019)
- "Bu Yollar Hep Sana Çıkar" (with Cem Adrian) (2019)
