= Kalben =

Turkish musician (born 1986)

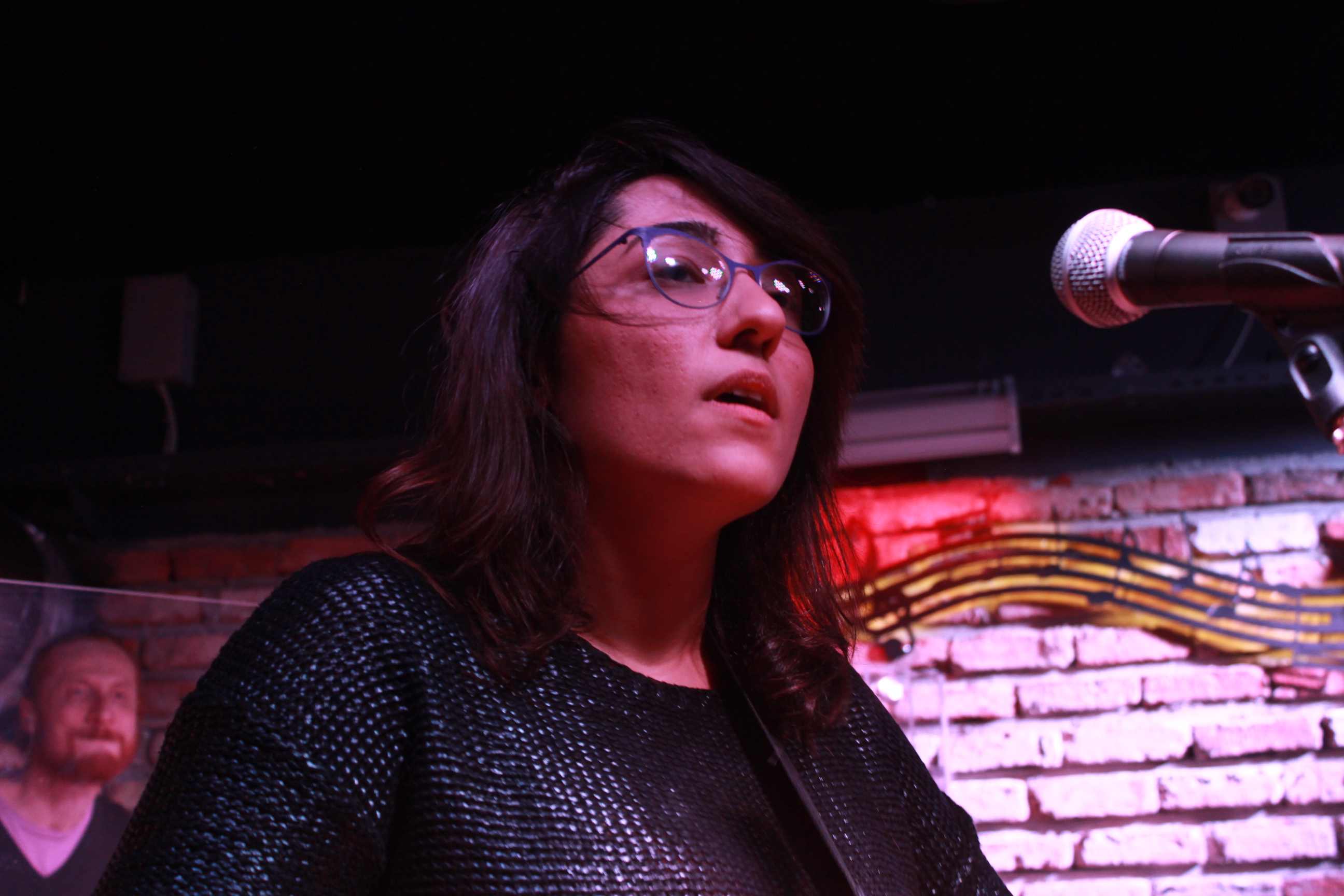
- During her Ankara concert (October 2015)

Background information
- Born: Kalben Sağdıç; 17 January 1986 (age 40); İskenderun, Turkey
- Genres: Indie rock; alternative rock
- Occupations: Singer; musician; songwriter
- Instruments: Vocals; guitar
- Years active: 2014–present
- Labels: DMC; Garaj
- Website: kalben.net

Kalben Sağdıç (born 17 January 1986), known mononymously as Kalben, is a Turkish singer-songwriter.

== Life and career ==
Kalben, who started to become interested in music by playing her mother's keyboard at the age of 8, had her first guitar at the age of 14. She has an older half-brother.

She graduated from Bilkent University, Department of International Relations, in 2007, with a scholarship. After trying to work in various fields, she started studying for her master's degree in Media Design and Cultural Studies at the same university in 2008 and graduated in 2011. She then moved to Istanbul to find a job. She started to work as a brand manager at Universal Pictures. Afterwards, she was busy with various works such as scriptwriting, editing, project managing, and translating.

She rarely continued to play music and held occasional concerts in Ankara and Istanbul. Her "Sadece" video, which was published in October 2014 on Sofar Sounds, became among the most watched Sofar videos in a short time.

She started her music career after publishing a series of children's novels named Lulu. She had a minor role in the series Aşk Kaç Beden Giyer?. Her debut album, Kalben, was released in February 2016 under the label DMC. It was followed by Sonsuza Kadar in 2017. Kalben released her third studio album, Kalp Hanım, on 20 March 2020 on all digital music platforms.

== Discography ==
=== Studio albums ===
- Kalben (2016)
- Sonsuza Kadar (2017)
- Kalp Hanım (2020)
- Eski Yeniler (2021)
- Eski Dünyanın Yangını (2022)
- Kayıp Aşıklar Ülkesi (2026)

=== EPs ===
- Aşk Çeşmesi (2019)

=== Singles ===
- "Geri Dönme" (with Cem Adrian) (2018)
- "Yaşamak Var Ya" (2018)
- "Kuşlar" (2018)
- "Günaydın" (2019)
- "Perişahı'nın Kızı" (2020)
- "Kahveyi Kavururlar" (2020)
- "Yüksek Yüksek Tepeler" (2021)
- "Robot Kozmonot" (ft. Teoman) (2021)
- "Şanssız Mücadeleci" (2021)
- "Ne Güzel Yerlerin Var" (2021)
- "Robot Kozmonot (Karakter Remix)" (2021)
- "Bilmiyor İçim" (2021)
- "Çünkü Başka Sen Yok" (2021)
- "Yağmurun Elleri" (Yeni Türkü Zamansız) (2022)
- "Taksi (Disco Tarantula Remix)" (2022)
- "Her Yerde Kar Var" (Fecri Ebcioğlu 100 Yıllık Şarkılar) (2023)
- "Oregon (Original Soundtrack)" (2023)
- "Çek (Emre Gören Remix)" (2023)
- "Hep Sonradan" (with Grogi) (2024)
- "Hatıraların Gölgesi" (2024)
- "İçimde Sen" (2024)
- "Akşamlarda" (2024)
- "Buluş Benimle" (2024)
- "İstanbul'da Değilim" (2025)
- "Kandırma" (2025)
- "Kasım Yağmurları" (2025)

== Filmography ==
- Jet Sosyete (2018) - Herself (episode 13)
- Menajerimi Ara (2021) – Herself (episode 26)

== Bibliography ==
- Lulu'nun Maceraları: Lulu Güneşi Arıyor (2014)
- Lulu'nun Maceraları: Lulu Okula Başlıyor (2016)
- Eski Dünyanın Yangını (2022)
