= Cem Adrian =

Turkish singer-songwriter

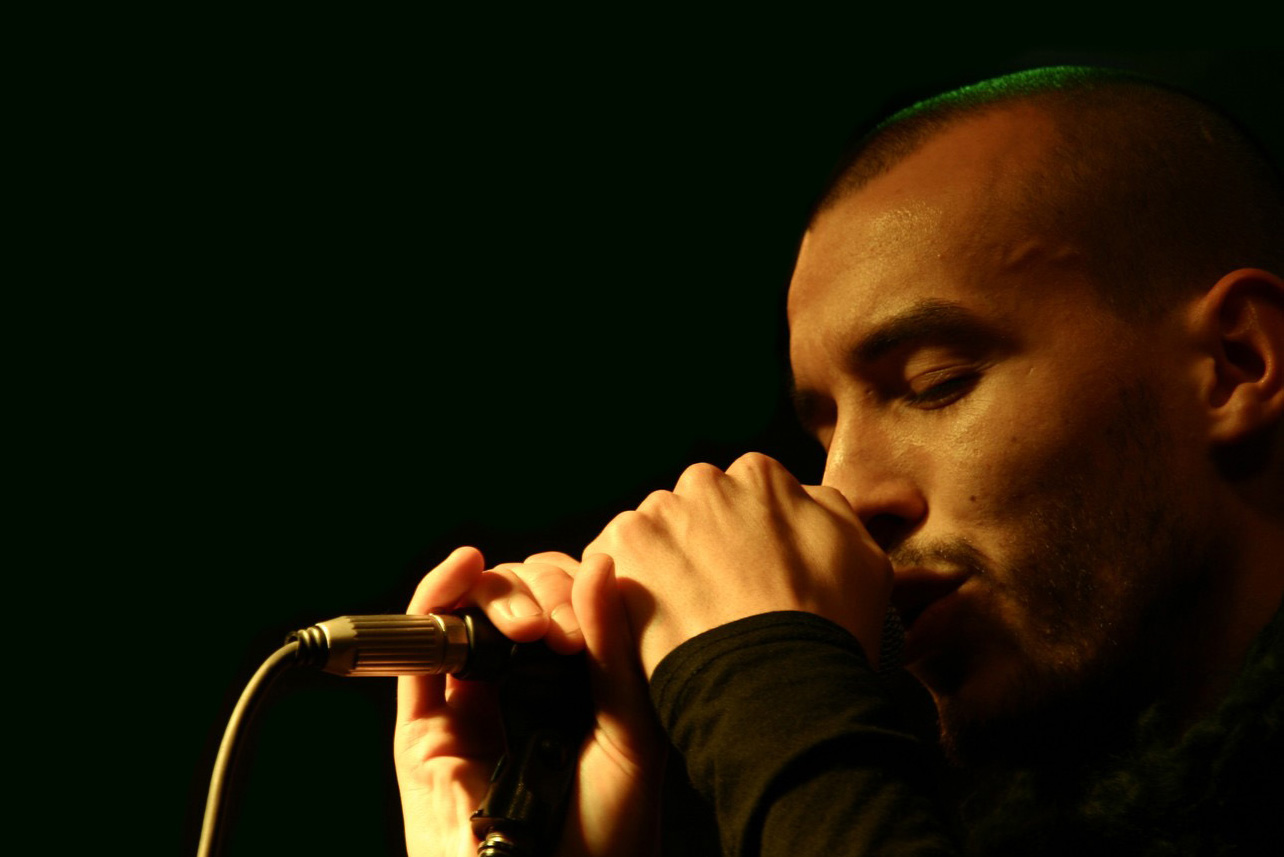
- Adrian performing in Ankara in 2008

Background information
- Born: Cem Filiz; 30 November 1980 (age 45); Edirne, Turkey
- Genres: Alternative rock; new wave; jazz; blues; electronica; a cappella
- Occupations: Musician; singer-songwriter; record producer
- Instruments: Vocals; keyboard
- Years active: 2003–present
- Labels: ADRIANOPOLIS; İmaj Müzik; UJR Productions; MK2; Dokuz Sekiz Müzik
- Website: www.cemadrian.com

Cem Filiz (born 30 November 1980), better known by his stage name Cem Adrian, is a Turkish musician of Bosniak descent, singer-songwriter and record producer.

== Early life ==
His father was a merchant, while his mother was a housewife. Adrian was born to a family from Bosnia in Edirne, as the second child of his parents. His real name is Cem Filiz. Adrian chose his stage name after Adrianople, the name of Edirne in ancient times. He later met Fazıl Say through Demet Sağıroğlu, and with Say's invitation, he enrolled in Bilkent University's Department of Performing Arts.

== Career ==
=== Career beginnings ===
In 2003, he worked as a soloist and dancer for the group Mystica. In February 2005, he released his first album, Ben Bu Şarkıyı Sana Yazdım. This album includes the songs which Adrian had recorded by himself between 1997 and 2003 in Edirne. In January 2006, he started working on his second self-produced album. Aşk Bu Gece Şehri Terk Etti, which contained 13 songs written by himself, was released in December 2006. Artists Umay Umay, Denizhan and Suicide were featured on three of the album's songs.

In 2008 he released two albums, Seçkiler (Essentials) and Emir, and produced the music for Abdullah Oğuz's film Sıcak, where he also played the role of a young imam.

=== Recent years ===
On 30 December 2015, his first single album İlk ve Son Kez, which contained two songs, was released on the internet. One of the songs was "İlk ve Son Kez", which was previously published, while the other was a new version of "Sessizce", which was originally included in the album Aşk Bu Gece Şehri Terk Etti.

On 21 January 2016, his album Seçkiler 2 was released by Dokuz Sekiz Müzik. In September 2016, he announced the release date of his album Tuz Buz to be September 2017, but it was eventually released in November 2017.

In 2017, to raise money for a child's surgery, Adrian together with Manuş Baba, Ceylan Ertem, Mabel Matiz and Derya Köroğlu gave a concert under the title "Bir Çocuk İçin Şarkılar (Songs for a Child)".

== Image ==
Adrian is among the artists who have publicly spoken about censorship in Turkey, freedom of speech and human rights. In response to questions regarding his sexuality, he said: "Is it possible for a man who sings with a high pitched voice to not face such comments?" His album Kayıp Çocuk Masalları, which was released in 2010, featured a cover that had an LGBT theme about which he said:

Does it matter whether I'm gay or not? I think people need to learn not to ask questions like that! I think what goes on in my private life is not related to anyone. I'm a musician, that's it.

— Cem Adrian, November 2010

After facing criticism for supporting the LGBT community in 2010, he said: "Actually I have a problem with those who have issues with people's sexual identity." In 2012, he recorded a music video for the song "Yalnızlık" from his album Siyah Bir Veda Öpücüğü, in which a transgender woman was shown. There was also a scene involving a young guy masturbating, which was meant to imply loneliness, the title of the song.

== Discography ==
=== Studio albums ===
- Ben Bu Şarkıyı Sana Yazdım (I Wrote This Song To You) (2005)
- Aşk Bu Gece Şehri Terk Etti (Love Has Left The City Tonight) (2006)
- Essentials / Seçkiler (Essentials) (2008)
- Emir (The Behest) (2008)
- Kayıp Çocuk Masalları (Lost Children Fictions) (2010)
- Siyah Bir Veda Öpücügü (A Black Farewell Kiss) (2012)
- Şeker Prens ve Tuz Kral (The Sugar Prince and The Saline King) (2013)
- Cam Havli (Glass rush) (2014, with Umay Umay)
- Sana Bunları Hiç Bilmediğin Bir Yerden Yazıyorum (I Write These from Somewhere You Don't Know) (2014)
- Essentials / Seçkiler 2 (2016)
- Tuz Buz (Salt-Ice) (2017)
- Solmayan Şarkılar (Songs that Don't Fade) (2020)
- Gökyüzümün Yıldızları (Stars of My Sky) (2022)
- Essentials / Seçkiler 4 (2024)
- Solmayan Şarkılar 2 (Songs that Don't Fade 2) (2024)
- Mücevher (2024)

=== Remix albums ===
- Remixes 1 (2020)
- Her Yer Kül (2022)

=== Live albums ===
- Cem Adrian Canlı (2021)

=== EPs ===
- 2015: Yalnızlık Senden Daha Çok Seviyor Beni (Loneliness loves me more than you do) (2015)

=== Singles ===
- 2015: İlk ve Son Kez
- 2016: Siyah Beyaz
- 2018: Kalbim Çukurda (with Gazapizm)
- 2018: Essentials / Seçkiler 3
- 2018: Sen Benim Şarkılarımsın (feat. Hande Mehan)
- 2018: Geri Dönme (feat. Kalben)
- 2018: Yolun Sonu Görünüyor (feat. Musa Eroğlu)
- 2018: Kirpiğin Kaşına Değdiği Zaman (feat. Ahmet Aslan)
- 2019: Ah Bu Şarkıların Gözü Kör Olsun (feat. Hande Mehan)
- 2019: Kum Gibi (feat. Hande Mehan)
- 2019: O Yar Gelir (feat. Zeynep Karababa)
- 2019: Bu Yollar Hep Sana Çıkar (feat. Hande Mehan)
- 2019: Bana Sorma (feat. Melek Mosso)
- 2020: Hüzün Kovan Kuşu
- 2020: Yeniden (with Şanışer)
- 2020: Bu Şarkı Aşka Yazıldı
- 2020: Tutacağım Ellerini (feat. Halil Sezai & Hayko Cepkin)
- 2020: Yarim Gurbete Gider (feat. Celo Boluz)
- 2020: Kirpiğin Kaşına Değdiği Zaman (feat. Ahmet Aslan) [Emrah Turken Remix]
- 2020: Yalnız Adam
- 2020: Kara Toprak (feat. Deeperise & Şanışer)
- 2020: Yolun Sonunda
- 2020: Hatırla (with Sezgin Alkan)
- 2020: Ölüm ile Yaşam (with Anıl Piyancı)
- 2020: Dön Dünya (with Şehinşah)
- 2021: Kül (with Mark Eliyahu)
- 2021: Bükülüyor Zaman
- 2021: Gesi Bağları
- 2021: Yine mi Yol (feat. Sena Şener)
- 2021: Bir Kar Tanesi
- 2021: Kanatlar (with Yung Kafa & Kücük Efendi)
- 2021: Pervane (feat. Günay Acar)
- 2021: Ağlasam mı
- 2021: Bitlis'te Beş Minare (with Çiğdem Sarvazlar)
- 2021: Kim Daha Çok Seviyor (Çelik Şarkıları)
- 2021: Derinlerde (with Mark Eliyahu)
- 2021: Kimse Bilmez (with Mehmet Güreli)
- 2021: Değmen Benim [Hayri Darar & Çağrı Baki Remix]
- 2021: Salvatore
- 2021: Ayrılık
- 2021: Gemiler
- 2022: Çığlık Çığlığa
- 2022: Çember (Yeni Türkü Zamansız)
- 2022: En Çok Seni
- 2022: Hüzün (with Levent Özkazanç)
- 2022: Öyle Yalnız (with Hande Mehan)
- 2022: Sevme Beni (with Lara Çayan)
- 2022: Gül
- 2022: Karanlık Orman (with Trangela)
- 2022: Bana Unutmayı Anlat (with Emir Can İğrek)
- 2022: Bana Seni Gerek Seni
- 2022: Zincir
- 2022: Keskin
- 2022: Sevdim Seni Bir Kere (with Hande Mehan)
- 2022: Düştüm (Live) (with Şanışer)
- 2022: Gönül (with Ezgi Kosa)
- 2022: Emanet
- 2022: Ben Sana Veda Edemem (with Çağan Şengül)
- 2022: Kendine İyi Bak (with Ecem Erkek)
- 2022: Gam Elinden Benim Zülfü Siyahım (Live)
- 2023: Viran (with Derya Bedavacı)
- 2023: Bu Gece Benimle Ölür Müsün (with Perdenin Ardındakiler)
- 2023: Sızı
- 2023: Bir Ay Doğar (with Yunus Kırmacı)
- 2023: Hüküm (with Mark Eliyahu & Sezgin Alkan)
- 2023: Yemin
- 2023: Sancı
- 2023: AF
- 2023: Mühür (with Taşkan)
- 2023: Saykodelik (with Nazan Öncel)
- 2023: Yine mi Yolculuk
- 2023: Gel (with Termo)
- 2023: Bensiz (with Fatma Turgut)
- 2023: Beni Vur (with Aylin Aslım)
- 2024: Yıldızlar Ellerinde (Kargo: Yarına Kalan Şarkılar)
- 2024: Şehir (with Umut Harbeli)
- 2024: Sen Gel Diyorsun
- 2024: Helal (with Çağan Şengül)
- 2024: Aşk (with Dedublüman)
- 2024: Yardım Eli (with Perdenin Ardındakiler)
- 2024: Bazen Olmaz (with Sokrat St)
- 2024: Sevdan Bir Ateş
- 2025: Susuz (with Erhan Yılmaz)
- 2025: Seni Sevmek

=== Guest appearances ===
- Made in Turkey Vol. IV (selection)
  - Al Fadimem (folk song, from album Essentials)
- Lora: Bir Kadının Portresi
  - Sis
- Artun Ertürk & Diplomatik Rock Opera
  - Sevgisizlik
- Tetik: Ta Kendisi
  - Beş kişi arabada
- Soner Canözer & Prag Filarmoni Orkestrası: Masalcı’nın On Beş Yılı (2009)
  - Kaf Dağının Ardında
- Fazıl Say featuring Güvenç Dağüstün, Burcu Uyar and Selva Erdener
  - İnsan İnsan
- Mahzuni'ye Saygı (2017)
  - Dumanlı Dumanlı
