= Aslı Orcan =

Turkish actress and dancer (born 1980)

- Born: 27 May 1980 (age 46); Aydın, Turkey
- Occupation: Actress
- Spouse: Yetkin Dikinciler (m. 2014)
- Children: 1

Aslı Orcan (born 27 May 1980) is a Turkish actress and dancer. She graduated from Turkish Folk Dancing at the State Conservatoire of Ege University in İzmir, Turkey. She married Yetkin Dikinciler in 2014.

== Filmography ==
Year	Title	Role	Type	Network
2002	Sır Kapısı / Sırlar Dünyası	Şükran	TV series	
2003–2004	Hekimoğlu	Mehlika	TV series	
2004	Burçak Tarlası	Banu	Film	Kanal 7
2004	İnce Hacı	Zühre	Film	
2005	Operasyon Cennet		Film	
2005	Çapkın		TV series	Show TV
2005	Sensiz Olmuyor		TV series	Show TV
2006	Kaybolan Yıllar	Yasemin	TV series	Star TV
2007	İki Yabancı	Rana	TV series	atv
2007–2008	Yemin	Yeşim	TV series	FOX
2008	Ateş ve Barut	Yonca	TV series	FOX
2009	Cam Kırıkları	Emel	TV series	TRT1
2009	Aile Saadeti	Marika	TV series	atv
2012–2013	Karadayı	Serra Aşık	TV series	atv
2014	Kurt Seyit ve Şura	Barones Lola	TV series	Star TV
2014–2015	Medcezir	Deniz	TV series	Star TV
2016–2017	Bana Sevmeyi Anlat	Berna	TV series	FOX
2017	Kara Yazı	Elif	TV series	Kanal D
2021	Kahraman Babam	Ayşe	TV series	Show TV
2021–2022	Sadakatsiz	Leyla Ateşoğlu	TV series	Kanal D
2022	Darmaduman		TV series	FOX
2023	Bambaşka Biri	Nükhet Arslan	TV series	FOX
2024	Leyla: Hayat... Aşk... Adalet...	Firdevs Köroğlu	TV series	Now
