= Bana Sevmeyi Anlat =

- Also known as: Wings of Love
- Written by: Deniz Akçay
- Directed by: Mesude Erarslan
- Starring: Kadir Doğulu; Seda Bakan; Mustafa Üstündağ; Dolunay Soysert; Kadir Çermik; Mahperi Mertoğlu; Cemil Büyükdöğerli; Bihter Dinçel; Serdar Özer; Güven Hokna; Halil Ergün; Aslı Orcan; Bahadır Vatanoğlu; Mine Kılıç; Emir Çubukçu; Gülper Özdemir; İlayda Alişan; Naz Sayıner; Salah Tolga Tuncer; Çisem Çancı; Lavinya Ünlüer; Poyraz Enes Koç
- Composer: Toygar Işıklı
- Country of origin: Turkey
- Original language: Turkish
- No. of seasons: 1
- No. of episodes: 22

Production
- Producer: Kerem Çatay
- Running time: 140 minutes
- Production company: Ay Yapım

Original release
- Network: Fox Turkey
- Release: 26 August 2016 – 30 January 2017

Bana Sevmeyi Anlat (English: Wings of Love) is a Turkish television drama series produced by Ay Yapım that premiered on Fox Turkey on August 26, 2016.

It aired on Fridays and Mondays at 20:00 PM in Turkish time. The last episode aired on 30 January 2017, and the series ended because of low ratings.

== Plot ==
Alper Eren is a famous cook and has his own restaurant, he is married with Berna and they have a daughter, Çiçek. They want to separate because they are always fighting and Berna secretly has an affair with Alper's best friend, Onur.

One day Alper's brother Cihan was looking for Onur to get the rental money of the restaurant. But Onur stole the money. Berna was also looking for Onur. Cihan knew that Berna and Onur had a relationship. they were arguing in the car which led to a car accident. Cihan died, but Berna was in coma.

Alper now has to take care of Cihan's daughters, Eylül and Mercan. Alper is also financially struggling as Onur has stolen all the money, so he has to sell the restaurant and his house. Hasmet, a rich man and a businessman wants to open a restaurant. His righthand Engin who is also Alper's childhood friend tells Hasmet that his friend Alper is a cook and wants them to work together to help Alper. Alper and Hasmet become partners. Hasmet invites Alper at his wedding.

Divorcée and single mother, Leyla Aydin is living in Germany with her father, her stepmother, half-siblings and her son. They are struggling to live together as they don't get along and have financial problems. Leyla's mother abandoned her and her father when she was a baby. And her father works for rich businessman, Hasmet. One day Hasmet needs a translator and her father Salih tells Hasmet that Leyla can speak different languages. He meets her and is amazed by her beauty, he falls in love. After few days Haşmet wants to marry Leyla. She agrees for the sake of her son, as she is making ends meet and knows that Hasmet can provide things for her and her son. On the wedding day she escapes because she finds out Hasmet is involved in dangerous business and is a criminal. Whilst Leyla is escaping from the wedding, she jumps in the nearest car which is Alper's car so now Alper has to hide her from Haşmet. Their journey and love story starts from here. However, there are problems with Haşmet searching the ends of the earth for her and later Alper's wife, Berna awakes from her coma.

== Cast and characters ==
- Kadir Doğulu as Alper Eren, a successful chef who is married to Berna and they have a daughter together, Çiçek. He doesn't love his wife but stays with her for the sake of their daughter. After his brother dies, he takes care of his nieces, Eylül and Mercan and looks after them. Later, he meets Leyla and they soon become attracted to each other. They fall in love even though they know it's not allowed.
- Seda Bakan as Leyla Aydın Eren, (formerly Leyla Demir) a beautiful young woman who is a divorcée and has a baby boy and lives with her father and step family. She runs away on her wedding day after learning Haşmet is a criminal and mistakenly gets into Alper's car. She soon falls in love with him, but they face hardships along the way.
- Mustafa Üstündağ as Haşmet Tuğcu, an older man who is a businessman and a criminal involved in illegal activities. He fell in love with Leyla at first sight. When Leyla runs away he searches for her everywhere.
- Dolunay Soysert as Canan Güngör, Leyla's strict boss who owns a fashion company. She is later revealed to be Leyla's biological mother.
- Kadir Çermik as Salih Aydın, Leyla's father who she is extremely close to.
- Mahperi Mertoğlu as Ayla Aydın, Leyla's step mother who doesn't like her and her son.
- Cemil Büyükdöğerli as Onur Bozan, a family friend of Alper who he is close to. He betrays Alper by having an affair with his wife.
- Bihter Dinçel as Suzan Giray, Alper's estranged sister who later becomes divorced and moves in with her brother and nieces
- Serdar Özer as Engin Kargı, Haşmet's right-hand man who searches for Leyla. He is also Alper's childhood friend. He finds Leyla's best friend, Ezgi and uses her to find Leyla, but ends up falling for her.
- Aslı Orcan as Berna Eren, Alper's first wife who has a daughter with him. She had an affair with his friend, Onur, which her brother in law found out and resulted in his death and Berna in a coma. She wakes up later on and wants Alper back.
- Bahadır Vatanoğlu as Hakverdi Aydın, Leyla's half-brother whom unlike his mother and sister has always been close to since childhood and her son. When Leyla escapes he tries to find her and bring her to Hasmet (as he wants to be reunited with his girlfriend) but he later on helps Leyla and expose Hasmet.
- Mine Kılıç as Ezgi Güneş, Leyla's best friend who helps her to escape. She is found out by Engin but stays loyal to Leyla. She and Engin fall in love later.
- Emir Çubukçu as Burak Tuğcu, Haşmet's nephew who falls for Eylül.
- Gülper Özdemir as Simge Aydın, Leyla's half-sister who she doesn't get along with. She is in love with Burak.
- İlayda Alişan as Eylül Eren, Alper's elder niece who is at first doesn't like Leyla. She falls for Burak later on.
- Naz Sayıner as Mercan Eren, Alper's younger niece who unlike her sister, likes Leyla.
- Salah Tolga Tuncer
- Çisem Çancı
- Lavinya Ünlüer as Çiçek Eren, Alper and Berna's daughter who yearns for a motherly love after her mother lands in a coma. She loves Leyla and her son.

== Series overview ==
Season	Episodes	Originally aired	
Season	Episodes	First aired	Last aired
1	22	August 26, 2016	January 30, 2017

== International broadcast ==
- Romania – The series premiered on September 19, 2017, on Pro 2 as O singură privire.
- Vietnam - The series premiered on October 20, 2017, on VTV1 as Đôi cánh tình yêu.
- Philippines – The series premiered on July 2, 2018, on GMA Network, under the title Wings of Love. It was the first Turkish drama to be broadcast on Philippine television.
- Brazil – The series started airing on July 3, 2018, on Rede Bandeirantes, under the title Asas do Amor. It was dubbed in Portuguese.
