= Damla Colbay =

Turkish actress (born 1993)

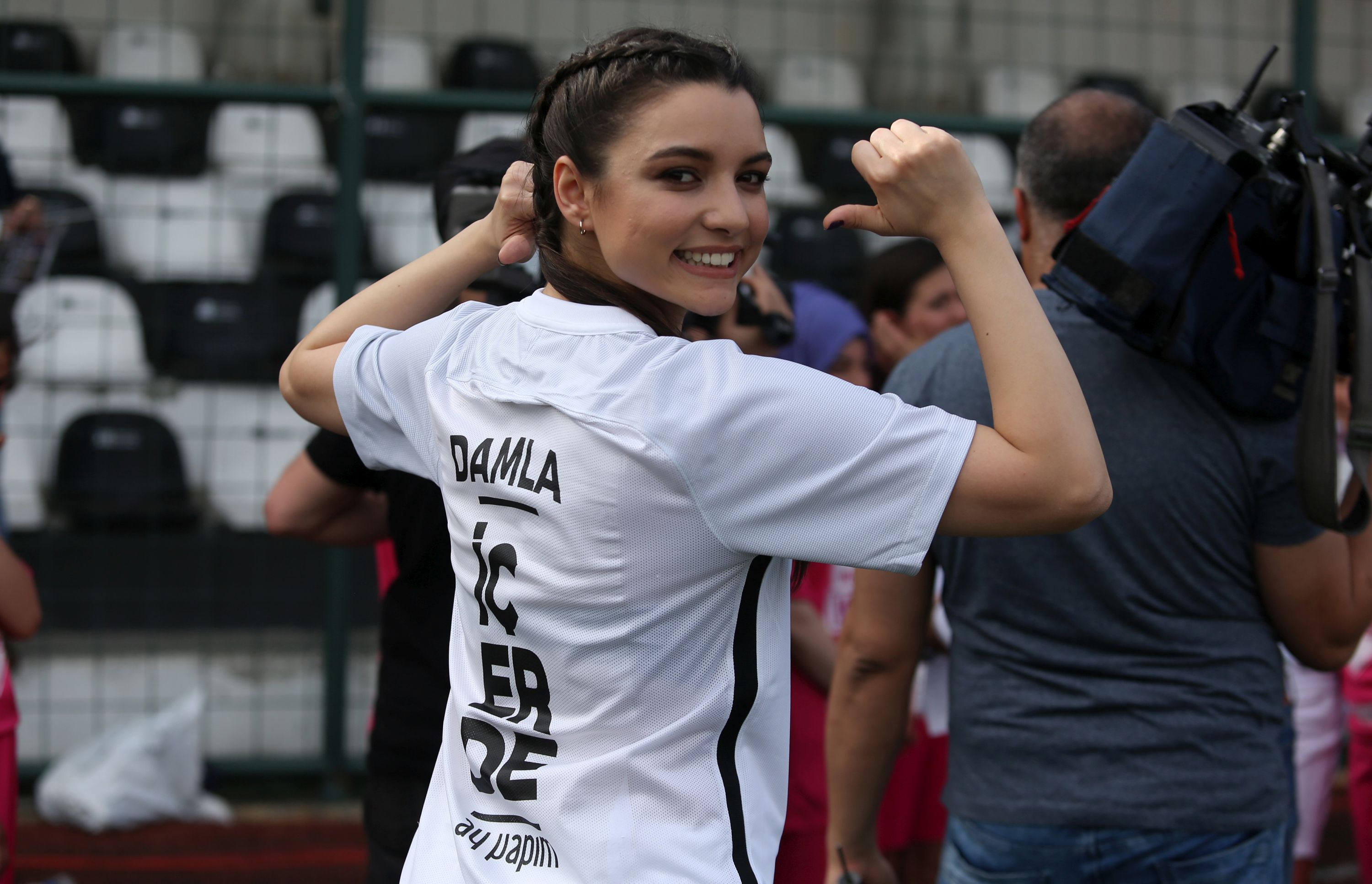
- Damla Colbay in 2017
- Born: 14 January 1993 (age 33); İzmir, Turkey
- Education: Dokuz Eylül University
- Occupation: Actress
- Years active: 2014–present

Damla Colbay (pronounced: dɒmlɑ d͡ʒɔlbɑ͡ɪ; born 14 January 1993) is a Turkish actress.

She became famous for her work on the TV series İçerde.

== Life and career ==
Damla Colbay was born in İzmir on 14 January 1993 to Erhan and Ayten Colbay. She spent her childhood years in Karşıyaka and moved to Istanbul in 2013. She studies acting at Dokuz Eylül University in İzmir.

Damla made her first television appearance in 2014 in the TV series named Kara Para Aşk as Demet Demir.

In 2015, Damla got her first leading role as İnci Temizyürek in the Turk remake of Juana la Virgen, titled Hayat Mucizelere Gebe. Due to low ratings the series ended in early 2016 with 7 episodes.

In 2016, she starred as Eylem Aydın in İçerde. The series received high ratings becoming one of the most successful series in 2016 and 2017 in Turkey. İçerde broke the record as the most watched Turkish series on YouTube with its first episode reaching 11.6 million views as of July 2017.

== Filmography ==
TV series
| Year | Title | Role | Notes |
|---|---|---|---|
| 2014–2015 | Kara Para Aşk | Demet Demir | Supporting role |
| 2015–2016 | Hayat Mucizelere Gebe | İnci Temizyürek | Leading role |
| 2016–2017 | İçerde | Eylem Aydın | Leading role |
| 2019 | Zengin ve Yoksul | Aysel Taştan | Leading role |
| 2019–2021 | Hekimoğlu | Zeynep Can | Leading role |
| 2022 | Yalnız Kurt | Esra/Sare Türkmen | Leading role |
| 2022–2023 | Sıfırıncı Gün | Selin | Leading role |
| 2025 | Piyasa | Özge | Supporting role |
