= Melike İpek Yalova =

Turkish actress

- Born: 29 April 1984 (age 40); Istanbul, Turkey
- Occupation: Actress
- Years active: 2011–present
- Spouse: Altuğ Gültan (m. 2019; div. 2021)

Melike İpek Yalova (born 29 April 1984) is a Turkish actress . She is also the daughter of the former minister of state Yüksel Yalova.

After studying international communications at Bilkent University, Yalova studied international politics and crisis management at the Sapienza University of Rome. She made her debut as an actress in 2011, with a recurring role in the Turkish historical drama Muhteşem Yüzyıl, in which she portrayed a Castilian princess named Isabella. Between 2012 and 2015, she had a leading role in the drama series Karadayı. She then had brief roles in the series Hayat Şarkısı, Çember and İnsanlık Suçu. The next year she was cast in a leading role in series Bir Zamanlar Çukurova.

== Filmography ==
Year	Title	Role	Notes	Network
2011	Muhteşem Yüzyıl	Isabella Fortuna	TV series	Show TV
2012–2015	Karadayı	Ayten	TV series	ATV
2016	Hayat Şarkısı	Suzi	TV series	Kanal D
2017	Çember	Leyla	TV series	Star TV
2018	Can Feda	Doctor Seher	Film	—
2018	İnsanlık Suçu	Cevher Akışık	TV series	Kanal D
2019–2021	Bir Zamanlar Çukurova	Müjgan Hekimoğlu	TV series	ATV
2021–2022	Mahkum	Büge Yesari	TV series	Fox
