= Berkay Ateş =

Turkish actor

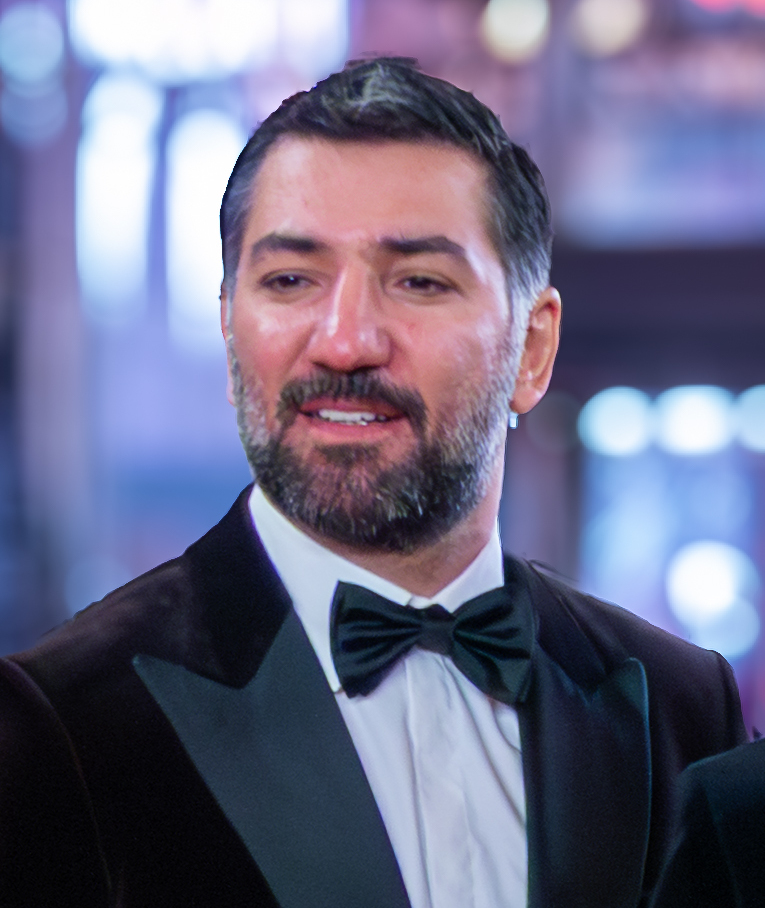
- Ateş at the 76th Berlin International Film Festival
- Born: 19 February 1987 (age 39); Istanbul, Turkey
- Occupation: Actor
- Years active: 2013–present
- Height: 1.80 m (5 ft 11 in)

Berkay Ateş (born 19 February 1987) is a Turkish actor.

== Life and career ==
Ateş was born on 19 February 1987 in Istanbul. His mother is from Malatya, while his father is from Ardahan. He is a graduate of Mimar Sinan Fine Arts University with a degree in theatre studies. He made his cinematic debut with the movie Yarım Kalan Mucize.

In 2015, he received the Promising Young Actor Award at the 22nd International Adana Film Festival for his role in the movie Abluka. He simultaneously continued his career on stage before making his television debut in 2016 with a role in İstanbul Sokakları. He was further recognized for his role in the TV series Anne, but rose to prominence with his role as Mahsun in Çukur and Ozan Akınsel in Alev Alev.

== Filmography ==
=== Film ===
Film
| Year | Title | Role | Notes |
|---|---|---|---|
| 2013 | Yarım Kalan Mucize | İsyancı | Supporting role |
| 2015 | Abluka | Ahmet | Leading role |
| 2019 | Görülmüştür | Zakir | Leading role |
| 2023 | Karanlık Gece | İshak | Leading role |
| 2026 | Salvation | Yılmaz | Supporting role |

=== Television ===
Television
| Year | Title | Role | Notes | Network |
|---|---|---|---|---|
| 2016 | İstanbul Sokakları | Saltuk | Supporting role | Show TV |
| 2016–2017 | Anne | Cengiz Yıldız | Supporting role | Star TV |
| 2018 | Gülizar | Fettah | Supporting role | Kanal D |
| 2018–2020 | Çukur | Mahsun/Fikret | Supporting role | Show TV |
| 2020–2021 | Alev Alev | Ozan Akınsel | Leading role | Show TV |
| 2021–2022 | Sadakatsiz | Aras Ateşoğlu | Leading role | Kanal D |
| 2023–2024 | Aldatmak | Kahraman | Supporting role | ATV |

=== Internet ===
Television
| Year | Title | Role | Notes | Platform |
|---|---|---|---|---|
| 2020 | Alef | İdris | Supporting role | BluTV |
| 2023 | Magarsus | Beton | Leading role | BluTV |

== Theatre ==
Theatre
| Year | Title | Venue |
|---|---|---|
| 2014/15 | Karabatak | Tiyatro D22 |
| 2015/16 | Yirmi Beş | Tiyatro D22 |
| 2015/16 | Bent | Tiyatro D22 |
| 2016/17 | Kuş Öpücüğü | Tiyatro D22 / Moda Sahnesi |
| 2016/17 | Dünyaya Gözlerimden Bak | D22 Köşk |

== Awards ==
| Year | Organization | Category |
|---|---|---|
| 2015 | 22nd International Adana Film Festival | Promising Young Actor |
| 2017 | Cevdet Kudret Literature Award | Best Stage Actor (Hakikat, Elbet Bir Gün) |
