= Tuz Buz =

Studio album by Cem Adrian
- Released: November 13, 2017
- Genre: Alternative
- Length: 61:00
- Label: UJR Productions

Cem Adrian chronology
Essentials / Seçkiler 2 (2016)	Tuz Buz (2017)	Remixes 1 (2020)

Tuz Buz is the seventh album by Cem Adrian. It was released on November 13, 2017 by UJR Productions.

== Track listing ==
1. Kurşun
2. Ölüyorum Ellerinde
3. Beni Hatırladın mı (feat Birsen Tezer)
4. Seni Seviyorum
5. Bu Gece Uyut Beni (feat Ceylan Ertem)
6. Buruk (feat Halil Sezai)
7. Hala Senin Suçun Var
8. Yine Özledim
9. Zaman
10. Gidemem
11. Tut Elimi
12. Geçecek
13. Tuz Buz
