= Nihat Altınkaya =

Turkish actor

- Born: Nihat Alptuğ Altınkaya; 28 September 1979 (age 46); Karabük, Turkey
- Occupations: Actor, model, sportsman
- Years active: 2006–present
- Spouse: İmre Altınkaya (m. 2010)
- Children: 2 Longueur = 1.85m

Nihat Alptuğ Altınkaya (born 28 September 1979) is a Turkish actor, model and sportsman. He is also the winner of the 2012 season of Survivor: Ünlüler vs. Gönüllüler.

== Personal life ==
Nihat Altınkaya was born on 28 September 1979 in Karabük. Born to a family that originates from Rize, he finished high school in Karabük. He has two sisters. His mother was a bank clerk, while his father run a business. He played in the volleyball teams of Karabük Demir Çelik High School and Ankara Emlak Bank Sport Club. After suffering from an injury at the age of 17, he stopped playing volleyball and began working as a bodyguard at a nightclub in Ayvalık. Later, he moved to Istanbul and after getting trained in boxing he joined the boxing department of Fenerbahçe S.K. He eventually began modeling and started appearing in TV series. He briefly dated his costar from Yaprak Dökümü Deniz Çakır. In December 2010, he married İmre Altınkaya. Together they have two daughters, named Melek and Ayşe. They reside in Istanbul.

== Career ==
He was first discovered by Gökçe Doruk Erten, after which he played in Funda Arar's music video "Özledim". He then continued his career as a model. Altınkaya eventually started his career as an actor and appeared in the Turkish-Belgian movie Turkuaz as well as two other films. At the same time, he got recurring roles in various TV series. He also received theatre lessons at "Ekol Drama Art House" from Ayla Algan and İpek Bilgin. He later shared the leading role with Ezgi Asaroğlu in Kağan Erturan's first feature film En Mutlu Olduğum Yer.

== Filmography ==
Film
Year	Title	Role
2010	En Mutlu Olduğum Yer	Kemal
2010	Turquaze	
2009	Aşk Üçgeni	
TV series
2025	Uzak Şehir	Doktor Yalcin
2023	Al Sancak	Boran
2022-2023	Kuruluş: Osman	Olof
2021	Teşkilat	Hulki
2019	Elimi Bırakma	Barış Yaman
2017–2019	Söz	Yarbay Erdem Kaçmaz
2016	Yüksek Sosyete	Levent Karatay
2015	Kara Ekmek	Aslan
2015	Medcezir	Kaan Mavideniz
2014–2015	Kara Para Aşk	Serhat
2013	Karadayı	Sinan Koca
2013	Tozlu Yollar	Fikret
2010-2011	Unutulmaz	Aras
2009–2010	Kahramanlar	Fireman Mete
2009	Yaprak Dökümü	Levent Tuncel
2009	Dudaktan Kalbe	Umut Altuğ
2007	Kurtlar Vadisi Pusu	Memati's confidant
2007	Menekşe ile Halil	Semih
2006	Binbir Gece	Fuat
Music videos
Year	Artist	Title
2006	Funda Arar	Özledim
2006	Nilgül	Konuşamıyorum
2007	Nilgül	Sen
2007	Yaşar	Sevda Sinemalarda
2007	Aylin Aslım	Ahh
