= Uluç Bayraktar =

Turkish film director (born 1974)

Uluç Bayraktar (born 1974) is a Turkish director. He graduated from Ege University with degrees in cinema and television. He is known as the director of İçerde, Ezel, Menekşe ile Halil and Karadayi.
