= Rıza Kocaoğlu =

Turkish actor of Kurdish origin

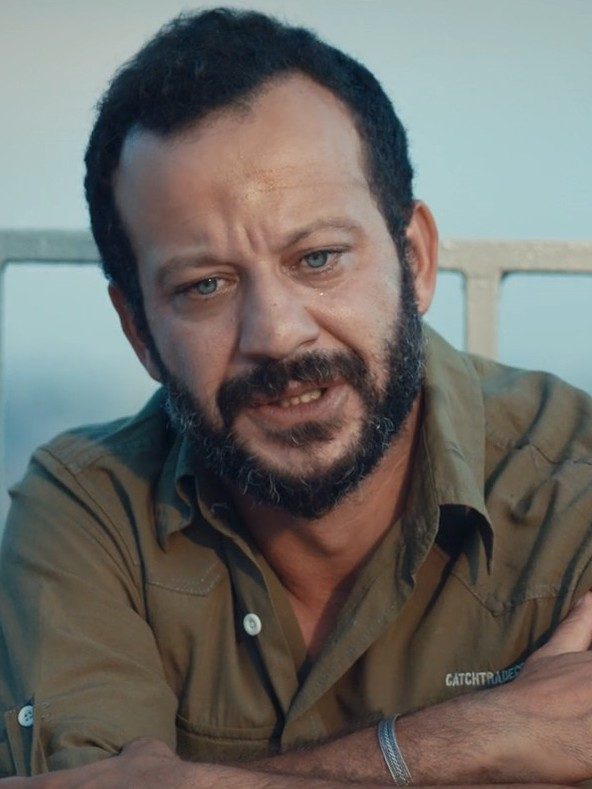
- Kocaoğlu in 2017
- Born: March 19, 1979 (age 47); İzmir, Turkey
- Occupation: Actor

Rıza Kocaoğlu (born March 19, 1979) is a Turkish actor of Kurdish origin. Born and raised in İzmir, he is mainly known for his role as Ali in the television series Kuzey Güney.

== Life ==
His maternal family is of Turkish descent who immigrated from Thessaloniki, Ottoman Empire (nowadays in Greece). His paternal family is of Kurdish descent of the Şêxbizin tribe from Kars and Yerevan. His sister, Gözde Kocaoğlu, is also an actress. He is a graduate of the theater department at Dokuz Eylül University and has worked in cinema since 2001. On 25 January 2013, 30 actors, including Rıza Kocaoğlu, were taken into custody for a drugs probe by Istanbul's narcotics police.

== Filmography ==
Filmography
Year	Title	Role
2001	Bana Şans Dile	Bahadır
2001	Yeni Hayat	-
2004	Ruhun Duymaz	Erdi
2004	Gece Yürüyüşü	Metin
2005	Organize İşler	-
2006	Avrupa Yakası	Korsan Kitap Satıcısı
2007	Emret Komutanım: Şah Mat	Obsesif Tuncay
2008	Sınıf	Cüneyt
2008	Ulak	Yakup
2009	Elveda Rumeli	Hacı Ali
2009	Sonsuz	-
2009	Başka Semtin Çocukları	Neco
2010	Elif	Oğuz
2010–2011	Ezel	Temmuz
2010	Av Mevsimi	Asit Ömer
2010	Kaybedenler Kulübü	-
2011	Behzat Ç. Seni Kalbime Gömdüm	Pembo
2011	Labirent	Haluk
2011–2012	Kuzey Güney	Ali
2012–2015	Karadayı	Yasin Ulutaş
2013	Behzat Ç. Ankara Yanıyor	Pembo
2015	Filinta	Celal
2015	Dünyanın En Güzel Kokusu	Hakan
2016	İstanbul Sokakları	Cemil
2016–2017	İçerde	Davut
2017	Dünyanın En Güzel Kokusu 2	Hakan
2017–2021	Çukur	Aliço
2019	Organize İşler 2: Sazan Sarmalı	Arıza Rıza
2020	Ya İstiklal Ya Ölüm	İhsan Pere
2020	Menajerimi Ara	Himself
2022	Another Self	Fikret (Fiko)
2022	Cezailer	Menderes
2022–	Tuzak	Güven Gümüşay
2022	Tamirhane	Müjdat
2023	10 Days of a Good Man	Zeynel
2023	10 Days of a Bad Man	Zeynel
2024	10 Days of a Curious Man	Zeynel
2024	Tezgah	
2024	Esas Oğlan	
2024	Asaf	Nasuh
2024–2026	İnci Taneleri	Nusret
2025	Adsız Aşıklar	Arda
2026–	Hamal	
2026	Tuzlu Kahve	Haydar
