= Ivy (2015 film) =

2015 film

- Film poster
- Directed by: Tolga Karaçelik
- Written by: Tolga Karaçelik
- Starring: Nadir Sarıbacak
- Release dates: 26 January 2015 (Sundance); 17 April 2015 (Turkey)
- Running time: 104 minutes
- Country: Turkey
- Language: Turkish

Ivy (Turkish: Sarmaşık) is a 2015 Turkish drama film written and directed by Turkish filmmaker Tolga Karaçelik. After premiering in-competition at the 2015 Sundance Film Festival in Utah, the film continued its festival circuit, screening at more than 30 international film festivals, including Toronto IFF, Karlovy Vary IFF, São Paulo IFF and Sydney FF. The film won four awards at the Antalya International Film Festival (previously known as Antalya Golden Orange Film Festival) including Best Film and Best Director, making Karaçelik one of the youngest directors to ever receive the Golden Orange.

== Cast ==
- Nadir Sarıbacak as Cenk
- Hakan Karsak as Nadir
- Kadir Çermik as Ismail
- Özgür Emre Yıldırım as Alper
- Osman Alkaş as Beybaba
- Seyithan Özdemir as Kürt

== Critical reception ==
The film was met with widespread acclaim from international publications, Nisimagazine, the official publication of NISI MASA - European Network of Young Cinema, wrote after seeing the film at Karlovy film Festival that it "displays narrative and visual mastery in exploring the decay of conventions of all kinds" In his piece for CineVue after the East End screening, Allie Gemmill gave the film a rating of four out of five stars, writing, "Slow-burning psychological dramas are tough to nail down. It often involves the right mixture of character and world building, a solid if not deceptively simple premise and a large enough injection of tension to sustain a feature-length plot. Turkish director Tolga Karaçelik's Ivy (2015) ticks all of these boxes and a few more. [...] This is a brilliant piece of filmmaking: quiet in tone but deeply unsettling and entirely engrossing." In his article What A Turkish Film Can Teach Us About American Fear for TIME magazine, Elliot Ackerman sees the universality of implementing fear as a way to control societal order. Less impressed reviews came from Variety's Dennis Harvey and Hollywood Reporter's Boyd Van Hoeij, who both commend the film for its strong performances, however finding it "more ambitious than controlled."

The film gained a cult following with the younger generation in Turkey, who appreciate the political allegory amidst the lack of criticism everyone is accustomed to, with the Cenk character being highly relatable for many.

=== Awards and nominations ===
Film Festival / Cultural Initiative	Category	Recipient(s)	Result
Sundance Film Festival 2015	World Cinema - Dramatic Competition	Ivy	Nominated
50th Karlovy Vary International Film Festival	East of the West Competition	Ivy	Nominated
56th Thessaloniki Film Festival	Golden Alexander	Tolga Karaçelik	Nominated
14th East End Film Festival	Best Feature Film	Ivy	Won
49th International Antalya Film Festival	Best Film Best Director Best Screenplay Best Actor	Bilge Elif Turhan - Tolga Karaçelik Tolga Karaçelik Tolga Karaçelik Nadir Saribacak	Won Won Won Won
SIYAD Turkish Film Critics Association Award	Best Actor Best Supporting Actor	Nadir Sarıbacak Ozgur Emre Yildirim	Won Won
Lecce European Film Festival	Cineuropa Prize		Won
36th Istanbul Film Festival	National Competition - Best Turkish Film of the Year	Tolga Karaçelik	Nominated (withdrawn due to censorship)

== Release ==
The film was released theatrically in Turkey on 4 December 2015. It earned a total of 259,281TL (€78,763) in Turkey, reaching an audience of 24,786. The film was released on Netflix.
