= Gazapizm =

Turkish rapper

- Born: Anıl Murat Acar; 20 July 1988 (age 38); Elâzığ, Turkey
- Genre: Hip hop
- Occupations: Rapper; singer; songwriter
- Label: Argo İzmir
- Partner(s): Cash Flow, Cem Adrian

Anıl Murat Acar (born 20 July 1988), better known by his stage name Gazapizm, is a Turkish rapper and singer.

== Life and career ==
Acar was born on July 20, 1988 in Elazığ.

He began making Turkish hip hop music in 2003, and in 2012 he founded Argo İzmir in Konak, İzmir. In 2014, he published the album Yeraltı Edebiyatı. He attracted attention with his street-like music compositions. In 2016, he released his second studio album Bir Gün Her Şey. He later recorded music videos for the songs "Gece Sabahın" and "Memleketsiz" in İzmir. His song "Heyecanı Yok" was featured on the soundtrack for the TV series Çukur. The song's release coincided with a period in which Turkish rap songs were more visible and used in the media and television. Later together with Cem Adrian, Gazapizm recorded the song "Kalbim Çukurda" for the same TV series.

== Discography ==
Albums

- Majör Depresyon (2009)
- Yeraltı Edebiyatı (2014)
- Bir Gün Her Şey (2016)
- HİZA (2020)
- Dönmek için Eve (2024)

EPs

- Karanfil (Live in İzmir) [feat. Tepecik Filarmoni Orkestrası] (2019)

Singles

- "Heyecanı Yok" (2017)
- "Kalbim Çukurda" (feat. Cem Adrian) (2018)
- "Ölüler Dirilerden Çalacak" (2018)
- "Alem - i Fani" (with Gripin; İyi Oyun Soundtrack) (2018)
- "Kaç İstersen" (2019)
- "Unutulacak Dünler" (2020)
- "Aborjin" (2025)

== Awards ==
Year	Award	Category	Nominee	Result
2018	Golden Butterfly Awards	Song of the Year	"Heyacanı Yok"	Won
2018	GQ Turkey Men of The Year Awards	Musician of the Year	Gazapizm	Won
