= Kadir Çermik =

Turkish actor

- Born: 21 July 1977 (age 48); Van, Turkey
- Occupation: Actor
- Years active: 1999–present

Kadir Çermik (born 21 July 1977) is a Turkish stage, film, television, and voice actor.

== Biography ==
Çermik is a graduate of Eskişehir Anadolu University State Conservatory. He made his television debut in 1999 with a role in the series Yılan Hikayesi. In the following years he worked mostly as a voice actor. His cinematic breakthrough occurred in 2008 with his role in the movie Made in Europe, for which he received the Best Actor award at the 15th International Adana Film Festival. He continued his career by appearing in supporting roles in series such as Muhteşem Yüzyıl, Karadayı, and Bana Sevmeyi Anlat. His performance in the 2015 movie Sarmaşık earned him critical acclaim and various awards. Between 2017 and 2021, he starred as a regular in the TV series Çukur.

== Filmography ==
=== Television ===
- 2025 - Gözleri KaraDeniz (Ali Kemal)
- 2024-2025 - Sahipsizler (Arif)
- 2024 – Kopuk (Ziya)
- 2022 – Bir Peri Masalı (Samet)
- 2021–2022 – Üç Kuruş (Baybars)
- 2017–2021 – Çukur (Emmi / Mucahit)
- 2016 – Bana Sevmeyi Anlat (Salih)
- 2015 – Kırgın Çiçekler (Necmi)
- 2012–2013 – Karadayı (Geveze Ahmet)
- 2011 – Muhteşem Yüzyıl (Louis II of Hungary)
- 2001–2004 – Kuzenlerim (Oğuz)
- 2001 – Yeditepe İstanbul
- 2001 – Yılan Hikayesi (Jandarma Cavit)

=== Film ===
- 2026 - Annem Hakkinda (Muharrem)
- 2024 – Tezgah (director)
- 2024 – 10 Days of a Curious Man (Hüso)
- 2023 – 10 Days of a Bad Man (Hüso)
- 2023 – 10 Days of a Good Man (Hüso)
- 2018 – Ahlat Ağacı (Adnan)
- 2017 – Put Şeylere
- 2017 – Murtaza (Zeynel)
- 2017 – Kırık Kalpler Bankası (Sabit)
- 2017 – Kaygı (Baba)
- 2014 – Sarmaşık (Usta Gemici İsmail)
- 2012 – Gözetleme Kulesi (Şoför)
- 2009 – Bornova Bornova (Salih)
- 2007 – Made in Europe

== Awards ==
- 2008 – 15th International Adana Film Festival – Best Actor (Made in Europe)
- 21st Sadri Alışık Theatre and Cinema Awards – Most Successful Actor in a Supporting Role (Drama) (Sarmaşık)
- 2016 – 27th Ankara Film Festival – Best Supporting Actor (Sarmaşık)
