= Manuş Baba =

Turkish singer (born 1986)

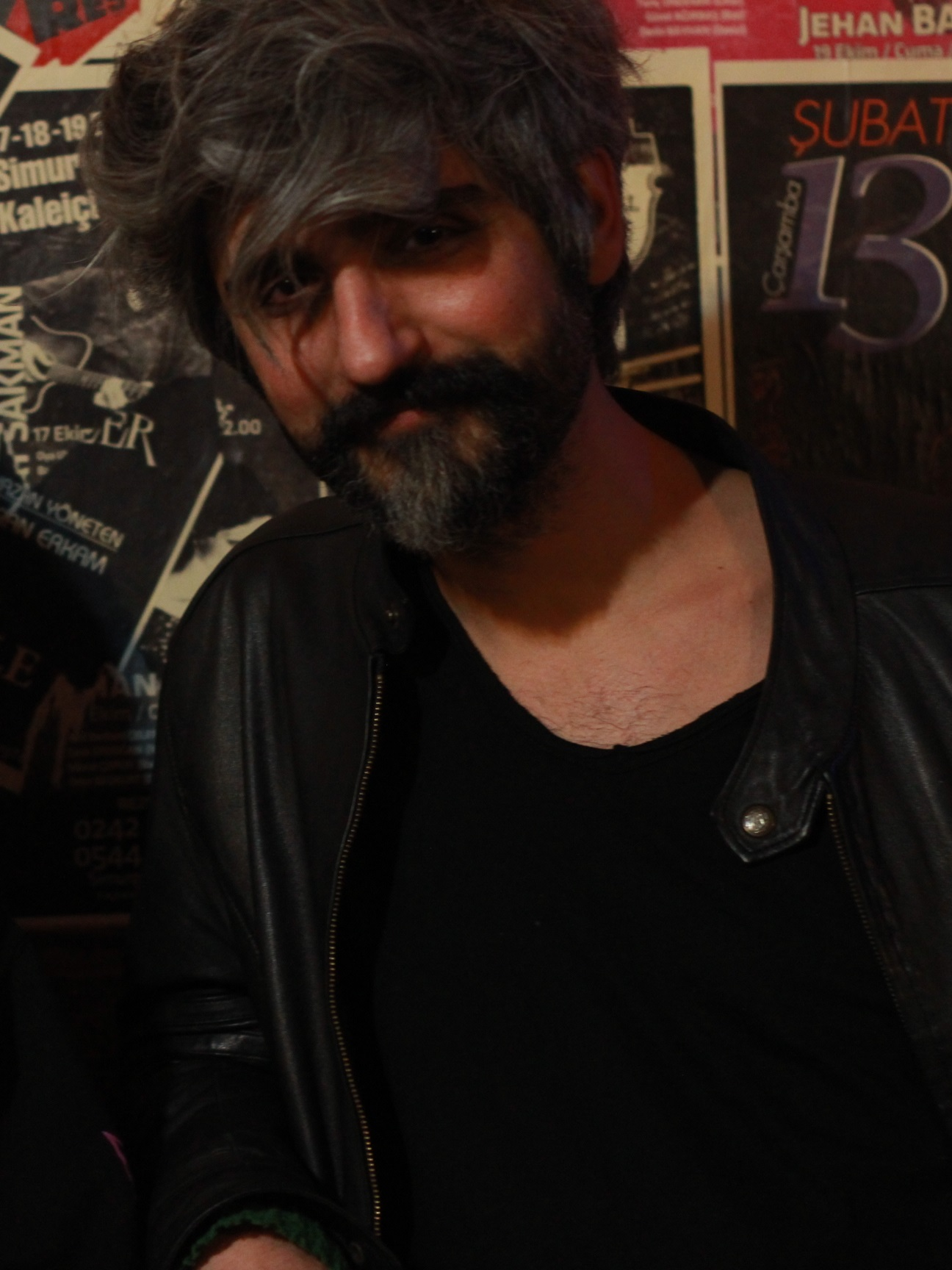
- After his concert in Antalya, March 2017.

Background information
- Born: Mustafa Özkan; 1 December 1986 (age 39); Tarsus, Turkey
- Genres: Pop, arabesque
- Occupation: Singer
- Instruments: Vocals, guitar, mandolin
- Years active: 2010–present
- Labels: DMC, Kınay Müzik
- Website: manusbaba.com

Mustafa Özkan (born 1 December 1986), better known by his stage name Manuş Baba, is a Turkish pop and arabesque singer. He studied at the Tarsus Turgut İçgören primary school in Tarsus. His family later moved from Diyarbakir to Antalya, due to his father's job as a seasonal worker in Antalya. He studied at Antalya Gazi High School and Akdeniz University. He started his music career with his band Güneşe Yolculuk in 2010. He also has had a number of hit albums in Turkey, including Bu Havada Gidilmez, Dönersen Islık Çal and İki Gözümün Çiçeği.

== Discography ==
Albums

- Dönersen Islık Çal (2017)
- İki Gözümün Çiçeği (2019)

Singles

- "Aşkın Kederi" (2016)
- "İstanbul" (2016)
- "Değmez" (2017)
- "Dayanamam" (2020)
- "Bir Tek Sensin İçimde" (2020)
- "Dam Üstüne Çul Serer" (2020)
