= Son Feci Bisiklet =

- Genres: Alternative rock
- Years active: 2011–present
- Members: Arda Kemirgent (vocals and guitar)

Son Feci Bisiklet (in English, "The Last Tragic Bicycle") is a Turkish alternative rock band founded in Ankara in 2011, by Arda Kemirgent (vocal, guitar) and Can Sürmen (drums).

All the members except Arda Kemirgent left the band. Arda continues to release his music under the same name as a solo artist. Released his first album Yavru Ejderha in 2026.

== Background ==
Kemirgent and Sürmen recorded the band's first six songs as a duo, and released them as the Son Feci EP. Later, Efe Güner (bass guitar) and Erkin Sağsen (guitar) joined the band, and they played their first concert in Ankara. In the same period, they got to the last ten in the second “Be the Band” competition, sponsored by Babajim Istanbul Studios, as well as reaching the finals in the Roxy Music Awards.

In 2012, Ozan Özgül replaced Efe Güner as their bass guitarist, and the band released four new singles. In 2015, they released an album called Vesaire, and performed live many cities in support of the album. In 2016, they released another single called "Sıkıntı Var" (English: "There is a problem"). In June 2016, the band took a break from live performances because the lead vocalist and guitarist Arda Kemirgent went into military service. During this time, they released two more new singles named "Zaman Yok" (Eng: "No time") and "Reklamlar" (Eng: "Advertisements").

== Current Band Members ==
- Arda Kemirgent – Vocal and guitar

== Discography ==
=== Studio albums ===
- Vesaire (2015)
- Kötü Şeyler (2017)
- Sistemik (2020)
- Yavru Ejderha (2026)

=== EPs ===
- Son Feci (2013)
1. Uzaydan Geldiğine Göre Yorgun Olmalısın 03:46
2. Kaybol 04:48
3. Varoluşum Yokuşu 04:08
4. Gaffola 02:46
5. Tavuk Korkusu 03.52
6. Küçük Saydam İnsanlar 04:19
7. Bikinisinde Astronomi (Bonus Track) 03:01
