= İçerde =

Turkish drama series

- İçerde series poster
- Genre: Action thriller; Police procedural
- Based on: The Departed
- Written by: Ertan Kurtalan; Toprak Karaoğlu
- Directed by: Uluç Bayraktar
- Starring: Çağatay Ulusoy; Aras Bulut İynemli; Çetin Tekindor; Mustafa Uğurlu; Bensu Soral; Damla Colbay
- Composer: Toygar Işıklı
- Country of origin: Turkey
- Original language: Turkish
- No. of seasons: 1
- No. of episodes: 39

Production
- Producer: Kerem Çatay
- Running time: 120 minutes
- Production company: Ay Yapım

Original release
- Network: Show TV
- Release: 19 September 2016 – 19 June 2017

İçerde (English: Inside) is a Turkish action thriller television series produced by Ay Yapım based on The Departed. The series first aired on 19 September 2016 on Show TV. The series received mixed reviews throughout its original run, however the performances of both lead actors Çağatay Ulusoy and Aras Bulut İynemli were met with critical acclaim.

== Plot ==
The series follows the story of two brothers, Sarp (Çağatay Ulusoy) and Umut Yılmaz (Aras Bulut Iynemli), who were separated during their childhood and end up on opposite sides of the law.

Umut and Sarp's father, Metin, works as an assassin for one of the most powerful mafia leaders in Istanbul, Celal Duman (Çetin Tekindor). When Metin is arrested and imprisoned, Celal kidnaps three-year-old Umut in order to make sure that Metin will not betray him. Sarp and his mother Füsun (Nihal Koldaş) never learn the truth about Umut's disappearance, as Metin dies in prison without revealing anything. They both think Umut is dead after the police bring them his blood-stained T-shirt, and Sarp grows up blaming himself for what happened to his brother and being constantly haunted by his loss.

Years later, Sarp is expelled from the police academy a week before graduation by his commander, Yusuf Kaya (Mustafa Uğurlu). At the graduation ceremony, he attacks Yusuf and is sent to prison for a year. It is subsequently revealed that Sarp and Yusuf planned everything in order for Sarp to infiltrate Celal's group as an undercover officer and help to arrest him. Sarp is even more determined to take down Celal after finding out that he was responsible for Umut's disappearance. Things take an unexpected turn when Sarp finds himself falling in love with Melek Yıldız (Bensu Soral), Celal's adopted daughter and lawyer, who, unbeknownst to him, is very close friends with his own brother.

Umut, renamed Mert Karadağ, doesn't remember anything about his family and is loyal to Celal, believing that he saved him and Melek from the abuse they had to endure on the streets. He becomes a police officer and is subsequently accepted into Yusuf's team, where he acts as a spy for Celal. After he falls in love with Eylem Aydın (Damla Colbay), Sarp's childhood friend, his loyalty for Celal is repeatedly tested to the point that he is starting to have doubts about his actions. Mert develops a close relationship with his own mother, Füsun, and a fierce rivalry with Sarp, completely unaware that they are his true family.

== Cast and characters ==
- Çağatay Ulusoy (1-39) as Sarp Yılmaz:

A former convict who becomes part of Celal's inner group, apparently following in his father's footsteps. He is, in fact, working as an undercover officer for commander Yusuf Kaya in order to arrest Celal Duman, whom he blames for the imprisonment and death of his father and for the disappearance of his younger brother Umut, which deeply affected him. Sarp has a strong sense of justice and is very intelligent and skilled, managing to gain Celal's trust and constantly avoiding being exposed as a cop. He falls in love with Melek, Celal's daughter, and finds himself repeatedly at odds with Mert Karadağ, who is, unbeknownst to him, his long lost brother Umut.

- Aras Bulut İynemli as Mert Karadağ Duman / Umut Yılmaz:

A corrupt police officer in Yusuf Kaya's team, and initially a major antagonist, who secretly works as an informant for Celal Duman. He grew up on the streets, where he was forced to sell napkins and suffered constant physical abuse at the hands of his captor, Coşkun. He is unaware that Celal, the man who adopted him and whom he considers his father, is also the man who ordered his kidnapping. Due to the trauma he suffered as a child, he trusts few people and has no friends except Melek, whom he loves like a sister. His greatest desire is to find his real family. Mert is very confident in his abilities to the point of arrogance and manages to save Celal from prison more than once during the series. He falls in love with Eylem Aydın, Sarp's childhood friend, and gets close to Füsun Yılmaz, his real mother; the influence of the two women eventually makes him having serious doubts about his actions.

- Çetin Tekindor as Celal Duman:

The main villain of the series. The leader of a powerful mafia group in Istanbul. He has always managed to avoid prison due to the deep loyalty of his people, in spite of the multiple crimes he has committed, such as Umut's kidnapping and the murder of Melek's mother. Celal is completely devoid of empathy, intelligent, highly manipulative and a very good liar, being capable to instill in both Umut and Melek a deep devotion towards him. He found the duo on the streets and raised them as his own, alongside his biological son, Mustafa. He considers Sarp one of his most trusted men and is completely unaware for most of the series that Sarp is, in fact, an undercover officer.

- Mustafa Uğurlu as Yusuf Kaya:

A police commander in Istanbul Police Department, who has followed Celal's activity for many years, hoping to arrest him. Yusuf's intense dislike for Celal comes from the fact that Celal used him back in their youth in order to discard one of his mafia rivals; as a result, Yusuf felt responsible for Celal's ascension to power and became determined to do everything he could in order to imprison Celal, sacrificing even his marriage in the process.

- Nihal Koldaş as Füsun Yılmaz:

The mother of Sarp and Umut, and the ex-wife of Metin. She was kept in the dark regarding her husband's activities and left him immediately after he was arrested, as she felt betrayed by his actions and did not want her children to be associated with a murderer. She is deeply affected by Umut's disappearance and subsequently by Sarp's imprisonment and affiliation to Celal. She is a kind, honest woman with an intense dislike for Celal, whom she blames for ruining the happiness of her family.

- Bensu Soral as Melek Yıldız Duman:

Celal's lawyer and adoptive daughter. She is Mert's adoptive sister and best friend. Her parents have been murdered when she was a child, and she was subsequently forced to live on the streets under Coşkun's supervision, where she met Mert, whom she befriended. Unbeknownst to her, she is, in fact, Celal's biological daughter; he was also directly responsible for the murder of her mother. Although she is a fashionista and considered very beautiful by everyone she doesn't have any friends except Mert, as everyone is intimidated by her close ties with Celal's group. She is a caring person, but also very quick to excuse Celal's actions, due to the gratitude and love she feels for him. She falls in love with Sarp without realizing that he is an undercover officer. However, later in the series, Melek is killed by one of Kudret's men, as a way to save Sarp.

- Damla Colbay as Eylem Aydın:

A photojournalist, Sarp and Umut's childhood friend and neighbor. She is not very close to her parents, due to the fact that they treat her as a friend rather than as a daughter. She loves Füsun and Sarp as if they were her real family, and is very devoted to both of them. She falls in love with Mert without being aware of the fact that he is Umut, or of his connection with Celal.

- Rıza Kocaoğlu as Davut:

One of Celal's most trusted men, Davut is, at the beginning of the series, the only person in Celal's group whose face and name are not known by the police. He is utterly devoted to Celal, obeying his orders with no hesitation, and is obsessed with Melek to the point of filling a closet with snapshots of her. He takes an immediate dislike to Sarp.

- Yıldıray Şahinler as Hasan Alyanak:

A mafia member with close ties to Celal. He meets Sarp in prison and introduces him to the group. His main priority is survival, and his loyalty is only to himself, which is why he keeps making alliances with various enemies of Celal, and then betrays them as soon as things do not go as expected.

- Nebil Sayın as Coşkun:

A former associate of Celal and the man who kidnapped Umut. Coşkun is eventually betrayed by Celal, who tries to kill him. He survives and resurfaces years later, determined to destroy Celal and expose his secrets.

- Gözde Kansu as Yeşim Duman:

Celal's wife and the mother of his younger child, Mustafa. She disregards her husband's illegal activities. She is suspicious towards Melek and her relationship with Celal, believing Celal to be way too attached to the young lawyer. She can also be manipulative at times, though not nearly as much as Celal. She loves her son dearly and she willingly puts herself in danger more than once for his sake.

- Uğur Yücel as Kudret Sönmez Tek:

A former friend of Celal, who was in love with Celal's sister, Nermin. Nermin killed herself, and both men blamed each other for the tragedy. Kudret's greatest desire is to get his revenge on the man he considers responsible for ruining his life, and he constantly schemes in this direction, kidnapping even Mustafa and Melek at some point in order to torment Celal. He has great respect for Füsun, Sarp's mother, as she used to be Nermin's best friend.

- Seyithan Özdemir as Minik:

One of Celal's trusted men. He is the right-hand man of Celal and spends most of his time doing things for him.

- Ilber Uygar Kaboglu as Mustafa Duman:

Celal and Yeşim's son and also the younger adoptive brother of Mert and Melek whom he is very close to. He and his sister get kidnapped by Kudret and Melek offers to sacrifice her life instead of her brother but they both are eventually saved.

- Barış Kıralioğlu as Musa:

Musa, a complex character, possesses a survival-oriented mindset. His loyalty centers on self-preservation, prompting him to forge alliances with adversaries of the formidable mafia boss, Celal Duman.

== Broadcast calendar ==
Season	Screening day and time	Season start	Final	Number of episodes shot	Episode range	season year	TV channel
Season 1	Monday 20:00	19 September 2016	19 June 2017	39	1–39	2016–2017	Show TV

== See also ==
- Çukur
