= Kerem Çatay =

Turkish television producer

- Born: 1979 (age 45–46); Ankara, Turkey
- Education: Bilkent University
- Occupation: Producer

Kerem Çatay (born 1979) is the CEO of Ay Yapım, a Turkish television production company.

Born in Ankara, Kerem Çatay graduated from Bilkent University Faculty of Economics, Administrative and Social Sciences. He completed his education in the Film and Television program at UCLA.

== Television series ==
Year	Title	Episodes
2024	Deha	
2022-2023	Aile	30 episodes
2020–2021	Alev Alev	28 episodes
2020–2021	Menajerimi Ara	45 episodes
2020	Babil	20 episodes
2020	Zemheri	10 episodes
2019	Kuzgun	21 episodes
2018	Şahin Tepesi	6 episodes
2018–2019	Çarpışma	24 episodes
2017–2018	Ufak Tefek Cinayetler	45 episodes
2017–2021	Çukur	131 episodes
2017–2018	Fi	22 episodes
2017	Bu Şehir Arkandan Gelecek	20 episodes
2016–2017	Cesur ve Güzel	32 episodes
2016–2017	İçerde	39 episodes
2016–2017	Bana Sevmeyi Anlat	22 episodes
2015–2017	Kara Sevda	74 episodes
2015	Beş Kardeş	13 episodes
2015	Analar ve Anneler	9 episodes
2014	Kurt Seyit ve Şura	21 episodes
2014–2015	Kara Para Aşk	54 episodes
2013–2015	Medcezir	77 episodes
2012–2015	Karadayı	115 episodes
2012	Son	25 episodes
2012	20 Dakika	25 episodes
2011–2013	Kuzey Güney	80 episodes
2011	Al Yazmalım	37 episodes
2010–2012	Fatmagül'ün Suçu Ne?	80 episodes
2009–2011	Ezel	71 episodes
2009	Samanyolu	29 episodes
2008–2010	Aşk-ı Memnu	79 episodes
2007	Dudaktan Kalbe	75 episodes
2007	Menekşe ile Halil	36 episodes
2007	Aşk Yeniden	13 episodes
2006	Yaprak Dökümü	174 episodes
2005	Zeynep	25 episodes
2005	Tombala	
2004	Dolunay	
2004	Kadın İsterse	51 episodes
2004	Çalınan Ceset	16 episodes
2004	24 Saat	
