= Başak Gümülcinelioğlu =

Turkish actress and architect

- Born: 22 October 1991 (age 34); Fatih, Istanbul, Turkey
- Education: Bahçeşehir University (bachelor's degree); ITU School of Architecture (master's degree)
- Occupations: Actress, architect
- Years active: 2016–present
- Spouse: Çağrı Çıtanak (m. 2022)
- Children: 1

Başak Gümülcinelioğlu (born 22 October 1991) is a Turkish actress and architect.

In addition to appearing in various TV productions, she has appeared on stage with plays staged at the Istanbul Folk Theatre and BKM Theatre.

== Life and career ==
Gümülcinelioğlu was born in 1991 in Fatih, Istanbul. Her family was one of the Turkish minority families that left Komotini when it became part of Greece on the collapse of the Ottoman Empire. Her surname "Gümülcinelioğlu" means "son of person from Komotini". She is a graduate of Bahçelievler Anatolian High School. During her high school years, she also studied at summer schools in London, Geneva and Brussels. After graduating from high school, she attended high school in a town in Kansas for one year with the AFS program on a scholarship, and received her second high school diploma. While in the USA, she acted in a musical play and started her musical theater education (2010). She left her studies unfinished due to an illness and returned to Turkey.

She continued her higher education at Bahçeşehir University School of Architecture and Design. After graduating, she continued her graduate studies on architectural design at Istanbul Technical University and worked in an architectural office. While continuing her master's program, she first studied acting at Müjdat Gezen Art Center, and then she was accepted to the London Academy of Music and Dramatic Art, where she studied drama and on-camera acting.

After completing her education in London and returning to Turkey, she acted at the Istanbul Folk Theatre for three years. In addition to the play Barut Fıçısı, adapted from the work of Macedonian writer Dejan Dukovski and staged by the Istanbul Folk Theatre, she also took part in the musical Hababam Sınıfı staged by the BKM Theatre in 2018. She translated the play Bumblebee, written by the British contemporary playwright Morgan Lloyd Malcolm, into Turkish, and the play was staged by Alt Sahne in Istanbul in 2019.

In addition to acting on stage, she acted in various television series. The song "Sen Çal Kapımı", which she recorded for the TV series Sen Çal Kapımı and whose lyrics and composition (with Kaya Çandar) belonged to her, was deemed worthy of the "Best TV Series Music" award at the Number One Video Music Awards in Turkey.

== Filmography ==
Television
| Year | Title | Role | Network |
|---|---|---|---|
| 2016 | Kalbim Yangın Yeri | Belkıs (young) | FOX |
| 2017 | Aşk Laftan Anlamaz | Eda | Show TV |
| 2018 | 8. Gün | Şehnaz Yüksel (young) | ATV |
| 2019 | Erkenci Kuş | Deniz Keskin | Star TV |
| 2020–2021 | Sen Çal Kapımı | Pırıl Baytekin Sezgin | FOX |
| 2021–2022 | Yargı | Neva Seçkin | Kanal D |
| 2022–2023 | Sipahi | Ezgi Sancaklı | Show TV |
| 2023 | Bir Derdim Var | Sibel | Kanal D |
| 2024 | Kül Masalı | Jale Giraylı | TRT 1 |
| 2026 | Çirkin | Lale Karataş | Star TV |
Web
| Year | Title | Role | Platform |
| 2020 | Yarım Kalan Aşklar | Çağla | BluTV |
| 2023 | Sen, Ben, O! | Aylin | BluTV |
| 2025 | Aşkı Hatırla | Umay | Disney+ |

== Theatre ==
Theatre
| Year | Title | Venue | Notes |
|---|---|---|---|
| 2017 | Barut Fıçısı | Istanbul Folk Theatre | actress |
| 2018 | Hababam Sınıfı Müzikali | Beşiktaş Culture Center | actress |
| 2019 | Yaban Arısı | Altsahne | translator |

== Discography ==
Singles

- "Sen Çal Kapımı" (2020)
- "Bir Anda (Akustik)" (2020)
- "Beni Bana Sorma" (feat. Cihad Selamlar) (2021)
- "O Melek Sen misin?" (feat. Karya Çandar) (2021)
- "Kiraz" (2021)
- "Neler Mümkün?" (2022)
