= Nilperi Şahinkaya =

Turkish actress

- Born: 23 February 1988 (age 38); Dakar, Senegal
- Occupation: Actress
- Years active: 2009–present

Nilperi Şahinkaya (born 23 February 1988) is a Turkish actress.

== Life and career ==
Şahinkaya was born on 23 February 1988 in Senegal. Her father, Salim Levent Şahinkaya, is a diplomat. She finished primary school in Paris and attended secondary school in Bern. In 2003, her parents divorced and she moved with her mother to Ankara and in 2006 she graduated from Lycée Français Charles de Gaulle. Between 2006 and 2010, she studied at Bilkent University School of Music and Performing Arts.

As she was studying, she made her television debut with a role in the daily series Deniz Yıldızı. She graduated from the university with her name entering the institution's High Hall of Fame. In June 2010, she was cast in period series Öyle Bir Geçer Zaman ki and settled in Istanbul. After portraying the character of Mesude in Öyle Bir Geçer Zaman ki, she joined the cast of crime series Kayıp, playing the roles of Defne and Sedef. Her breakthrough came with a leading role in rom-com Kiraz Mevsimi as Şeyma, after which she got a role in N'olur Ayrılalım, playing the character of Temmuz Akıncı.

She continued her stage career by getting a role in an adaptation of Who's Afraid of Virginia Woolf? directed by Hira Tekindor, in which she acted alongside Zerrin Tekindor, Tardu Flordun and Şükrü Özyıldız. She performed in play "Dijital Sahne: Bir Bebek Evi" which published in YouTube.

She later joined the cast of ATV's series Bu Şehir Arkandan Gelecek, playing the role of Aslı alongside Kerem Bürsin. After appearing in the web series Yaşamayanlar and Aynen Aynen with Kerem Bürsin for third times.

She continued her career on television with a supporting role in Kuzgun, Yeni Hayat, Yasak Elma.

With comedian Cem Yılmaz, she played for many times. She played an actress and her many roles in Netflix spin off comedy series Erşan Kuneri. She was cast in films "Yahşi Batı", "Deli Aşk". She played two roles in film series Karakomik Filmler and spin off film "Ayzek ile Bir Gece".

She performed in surreal web series "Derin Mor" and comedy web series "Nasıl Fenomen Oldum". She played in drama films "Gelincik", "Benim Babam Bir Melek".

== Personal life ==
She speaks English, Turkish, French, German and Italian fluently.

== Filmography ==
=== Web series ===
Year	Title	Role	Network
2018	Yaşamayanlar	Melisa	BluTV
2019–2021	Aynen Aynen	Nil	BluTV
2022	Nasıl Fenomen Oldum	Ala Ayar	beIN CONNECT
2022–	Erşan Kuneri	Seyyal Par	Netflix
2023	Derin Mor	Melek	Tabii

=== TV series ===
Year	Title	Role	Network
2009–2010	Deniz Yıldızı	Hande	FOX
2010–2013	Öyle Bir Geçer Zaman ki	Mesude	Kanal D
2013–2014	Kayıp	Defne ve Sedef	Kanal D
2014–2015	Kiraz Mevsimi	Şeyma	FOX
2016	N'olur Ayrılalım	Temmuz Akıncı	FOX
2017	Bu Şehir Arkandan Gelecek	Aslı	ATV
2019	Kuzgun	Güneş	Star TV
2020	Yeni Hayat	Nevin	Kanal D
2021	Yasak Elma	Cansu Yıldırım	FOX
2024	Senden Önce	Sahra	Kanal D

=== Film ===
Year	Title	Role	Notes
2009	Yahşi Batı	Alice Bouton	
2017	Benim Babam Bir Melek		TV film
2017	Deli Aşk	Melodi	
2019	Karakomik Filmler	Jaclyn	
2023	Do Not Disturb	Peri	Netflix film

=== Theatre ===
Year	Title	Role	Venue	Director
2008	Sis	Dali	Bilkent MSSF	Nugzar Gachava
2009	Kel Kantocu	Mme Smith	Bilkent MSSF	Gia Antadze
2010	Orkestra	Pamela	Bilkent MSSF	Yücel Erten
2010	Gişe	Customer	Bilkent MSSF	Özgür Avcu
2011–2012	Yaklaştıkça	Alice	Theatre Istanbul	Celal Kadri Kınoğlu
2013–2015	Who's Afraid of Virginia Woolf?	Honey	Oyun Studios	Hira Tekindor
2018	Kalp	Emma	Craft Theatre	İbrahim Çiçek
2021	Nora: Bir Bebek Evi		Dijital Sahne	İbrahim Çiçek

== Awards ==
- Tevfik d'Or Theatre Festival, Best Supporting Actress (2005)
- Tevfik d'Or Theatre Festival, Turkish Ambassador to France's Special Award (2006)
- 24th Sadri Alışık Theatre and Cinema Awards, Most Successful Actress in a Supporting Role (2019)
