= Feyyaz Şerifoğlu =

Turkish actor and singer (born 1991)

- Born: 7 August 1991 (age 34); Rize, Turkey
- Education: Tekirdağ Namık Kemal University
- Occupations: Actor, singer
- Years active: 2019–present
- Spouse: Merve Dinçkol (m. 2025)
- Children: 1

Feyyaz Şerifoğlu (born 7 August 1991) is a Turkish actor and singer.

== Life and career ==
Şerifoğlu is a graduate of the Textile Engineering Department at Tekirdağ Namık Kemal University. He participated as a contestant in O Ses Türkiye with the song "İnci Tanem" before releasing his own single "Gidene" in 2019. He first gained prominence with his portrayal of the character Can in Kırmızı Oda before being cast in a leading role in Camdaki Kız opposite Burcu Biricik. Şerifoğlu also worked as a backing vocalist for Ajda Pekkan.

== Filmography ==
Television
Year	Title	Role	Notes	Network
2020–2021	Kırmızı Oda	Can	Guest appearance	TV8
2021–2023	Camdaki Kız	Sedat Koroğlu	Leading role	Kanal D
2024	Bir Sevdadır	Yasin Bıçakçı	Leading role	TRT 1
Web series
Year	Title	Role	Notes	Platform
2025	Aşkı Hatırla	Boran	Supporting role	Disney+

== Discography ==
Singles

- "Gidene" (2019)

== Awards and nominations ==
Awards
Year	Award	Category	Work	Result	Reference
2021	47th Golden Butterfly Awards	Best TV Couple (with Burcu Biricik)	Camdaki Kız	Nominated	
