= Neslihan Yeldan =

Turkish actress (born 1969)

- Neslihan Yeldan in 2023
- Born: 25 February 1969 (age 57); Istanbul, Turkey
- Occupation: Actress
- Years active: 1987–present
- Spouse: Leo James Felix Pollock (m. 2007; div. 2019)
- Children: 1

Neslihan Yeldan (born 25 February 1969) is a Turkish actress.

== Career ==
She started her career in 1987 by joining Ortaoyuncular, a community of actors. In 1995, Yeldan graduated from Istanbul University State Conservatory with a degree in theatre studies. She then worked for theatre communities such as Kent Oyuncuları, Dormen Theatre and Duru Theatre before joining Beşiktaş Culture Center. She nominated as best supporting actress by Afife Theatre Awards and Sadri Alışık Awards She eventually started her television career in 1993 with a role in the TV series Yaz Evi. Besides appearing in numerous TV and cinematic productions, she has also worked as a voice actress. Her breakthrough came with her role in theatrical series Bir Demet Tiyatro as Füreya. She was one of the leading actresses in hit revenge series "Sahra". She was cast in many popular series and films.

== Filmography ==
Film
Year	Title	Role	Notes
1998	Kaçıklık Diploması		
2003	Kaçıklık Diploması		
2005	Organize İşler	Lalezar	
2006	Kabuslar Evi: Onlara Dokunmak	Yunus's boss	
2011	Vücut	Meltem	
2014	Karınca Kapanı	Münevver Sarıselimoğlu	
2016	Deliormanlı		

Television
Year	Title	Role	Notes
1993	Yaz Evi	Alev	
1996	Tatlı Kaçıklar	Serap	
1997, 2006	Bir Demet Tiyatro	Füreyya İşbilir	
1998	Tele Dadı		
2000	Kırık Zar		
2000	Güneş Yanıkları		
2002	Vaka-i Zaptiye	Saadet	
2003	Yuvam Yıkılmasın	Derya	
2003	Şapkadan Babam Çıktı		
2004	Sahra	Nil	Leading role
2004	Dişi Kuş		
2004	Her Şey Yolunda		
2006	Sahte Prenses	Vicdan	
2008	Peri Masalı	Pamira	
2010–2011	Dürüye'nin Güğümleri	Handan	
2010	Kavak Yelleri	Nur	
2012–2013	Kuzey Güney	Aynur	24 episodes (57–80)
2013	Saklı Kalan	Nevin Cevher	3 episodes (1–3)
2014–2015	Kiraz Mevsimi	Önem Dinçer	59 episodes (1–59)
2016	Arkadaşlar İyidir	Candan Subaşı	10 episodes (1–10)
2017–2019	İstanbullu Gelin	Senem	87 episodes (1–87)
2020–2021	Sen Çal Kapımı	Aydan Bolat	52 episodes (1-52)
2021	Evlilik Hakkında Her Şey	Süreyya	Guest starring (episodes 1, 4–)
	Gelsin Hayat Bildiği Gibi Asuman Gaddar episodes 16 episodes 4-20 Oya		

== Theatre ==
Theatre
Year	Title	Notes
1988	İstanbul'u Satıyorum	Ferhan Şensoy - Ortaoyuncular
1990	Soyut Padişah	Ferhan Şensoy - Ortaoyuncular
1996	Arapsaçı	Georges Feydeau - Dormen Theatre
1998	Sen Hiç Ateşböceği Gördün mü?	Yılmaz Erdoğan - BKM
2001	Bana Bir Şeyhler Oluyor	Yılmaz Erdoğan - BKM
	Tatlı Kaçık	John Fatrick
2011	Paçi	Burak Akyüz - Istanbul Folk Theatre
2013	Nafile Dünya	Emre Kınay - Duru Theatre
2014	2'si 1 Arada	Ahmet Kazanbal - Gate Production
2020	Anlaşılmaz Konuşmalar	
