= Şerif Erol =

Turkish actor and screenwriter

- Born: 8 October 1963 (age 62); Karşıyaka, Turkey
- Occupation: Actor
- Years active: 1997–present

Şerif Erol (born 8 October 1963) is a Turkish actor and screenwriter.

== Life and career ==
Erol decided to become a physicist and enrolled in the Physics Department of Boğaziçi University after his high school physics teacher declared to his class that they were not fit to become physicists. Later, he switched to the School of Economics. He subsequently joined the Boğaziçi University Actors Club and appeared in theatre play for a long time before joining Açık Radio in 1997.

Due to his desire for becoming a stage actor, Erol studied theatre and taught acting lessons. Meanwhile, he joined the Stüdyo Oyuncuları Theatre in Nişantaşı. In 2008, aside from his career for Stüdyo Oyuncuları, he started to take his own play Karanlık Korkusu to stage and in 2014 played the leading role in Babamın Cesetleri at the Krek Theatre established in Bilgi University. Since 2000, he has written the script for TV series such as Bir İstanbul Masalı, Hırsız Polis and Bıçak Sırtı and has simultaneously appeared in various cinema and TV productions. He also worked as a voice actor for TRT.

== Filmography ==
=== As screenwriter ===
- 2007–2008 Bıçak Sırtı
- 2003 Bir İstanbul Masalı
- 2007 Hırsız Polis

=== As actor ===
- 2014 Babamın Cesetleri (Baba)
- 2014 Şeref Meselesi
- 2015 Kalbim Ege'de Kaldı (Osman Gıpgıp)
- 2016 Hangimiz Sevmedik – (Hulusi Gültekin)
- 2017–2020 Kadın (Enver Sarıkadı)
- 2019 Mucize Doktor (Enver Sarıkadı – guest appearance)
- 2019 Kapı
- 2020 Öğretmen (Metin)
- 2021 Menajerimi Ara (Himself – guest appearance)
- 2021 İlk ve Son
- 2021–2022 Camdaki Kız (Adil İpekoğlu)
- 2021 Sen Ben Lenin (Imam Malik)
- 2022 Hayat Bugün (Ali Haydar Oruçov)
- 2022 Cezailer (Fuat)
- 2023 Rüyanda Görürsün
- 2023 Yargı (Hakim Yüksel)
- 2023 Ya Çok Seversen (İlter Evcili)
- 2023–2025 Kızıl Goncalar (Suavi Alkanlı)

== Theatre ==
- Babamın Cesetleri – 2012
- Karanlık Korkusu – 2008
- Oidipus Sürgünde – 2004

== Awards ==
- 21st Afife Theatre Awards – "Most Successful Actor of the Year" – Vanya, Sonya, Maşa ve Spike – Tiyatro Pera – 2017
