= Sen Çal Kapımı =

- Also known as: You knock on My Door (and also released as Love Is in the Air)
- Genre: Romantic comedy Drama
- Screenplay by: Aytekin Ataş, Yeşim Çıtak, Dilek İyigün & Erdem Açıkgöz (1-21, 24); Günsu Teker, Fikret Bekler, Kerim Ceylan & Elif Özsüt (22-23, 25-30, 38-39); Duygu Tankaş & Tunus Taşcı (31); Duygu Tankaş, Tunus Taşcı, Tufan Bora & Melek Ordu (32-37); Ayşe Üner Kutlu, Deniz Gürlek & Melek Seven (40-52)
- Story by: Ayşe Üner Kutlu
- Directed by: Ender Mihlar (1); Yusuf Pirhasan (1); Altan Dönmez (2-52)
- Starring: Hande Erçel; Kerem Bürsin; Bige Önal; Neslihan Yeldan; Evrim Doğan; Anıl İlter; Melisa Döngel
- Theme music composer: Aytekin Ataş
- Country of origin: Turkey
- Original language: Turkish
- No. of seasons: 2
- No. of episodes: 52

Production
- Executive producer: Asena Bülbüloğlu
- Production locations: Zeytinburnu, Istanbul
- Running time: 120-140 minutes
- Production company: MF Production

Original release
- Network: Fox
- Release: July 8, 2020 – September 8, 2021

Sen Çal Kapımı (known internationally as You Knock on My Door (Love Is in the Air)) [not to be confused with the Turkish series Yer Gok Ask (Love Is in the Air)] is a Turkish romantic comedy television series starring Hande Erçel and Kerem Bürsin. It aired on Fox from July 8, 2020, to September 8, 2021.

== Summary ==
=== Season One ===
After Eda Yıldız's parents die in an accident, she is adopted by her aunt and works in her aunt's flower shop. Eda's degree in Landscape Architecture is cut short because her scholarship from the renowned architecture firm Art Life, led by Serkan Bolat, is withdrawn.

Eda dreams of flying to Italy to complete her Landscape Architecture studies. Her long-distance boyfriend Cenk lives in Italy, and he delays meeting her in person. Eda meets Serkan Bolat at a conference at the university where she studied with her friends and handcuffs herself to him in anger. Serkan proposes a fake engagement with Eda so he can prevent his ex-girlfriend Selin get married. He suggests that she will pretend to be his fiancée for two months, and in return he will pay for her food, education, and housing in Italy. Eda initially rejects the offer, but her boyfriend leaves her for an Italian girl. In response, Eda kisses Serkan at a press conference. Eda accepts the offer with some changes: she will pretend to be his fiancée for two months, but to reimburse her for her lost scholarship, he will give her a job at his firm. Serkan hires her as his personal assistant, and he announces his fake engagement with Eda at work.

Eda and Serkan fall in love as Eda helps Serkan's mother overcome the trauma of Serkan's brother's death. When Eda decides to leave for Italy to pursue her further studies, Serkan proposes to Eda for real this time, and she accepts.

They start dating in real but they encounter yet another obstacle. Serkan's father is responsible for the death of Eda's parents, who died when the house he built crashed down due to his carelessness. Serkan finds out about this and pushes Eda away to keep her from being hurt by lying to her that his work is more important to him and he cannot prioritise her over it. He also moves out of his parents' house. Eda is hurt but determined to find out the real reason behind Serkan's strange behaviour so she flirts with Efe, a new partner in the holding, in order to get Serkan to admit his true feelings. It ends up working and Serkan shares the truth with Eda. Though initially upset, Eda eventually forgives Serkan and they get back together.

On their wedding day, Serkan must go to Italy for an important meeting, and he gets in a plane crash. He loses his memory and forgets about his year with Eda. In order to get Serkan's memory back, Eda tries recreating previous situations they have been in, but it doesn't work. Eda pretends to be engaged to another man, Deniz, and Serkan still doesn't remember, but little by little he falls in love with Eda again. This continues until the wedding ceremony, and Serkan bursts in as Eda says "Yes" to Deniz. He remembers.

At the end of the season, Eda discovers Serkan's medical documents that say he has cancer.

=== Season Two ===
Serkan Bolat and Eda Yıldız go through tough times during Serkan's cancer treatment. Serkan becomes obsessed with his disease and a completely different man after surviving, arouses a fear of emotional attachment. He delays his marriage to Eda multiple times and completely refuses any idea of becoming a father. Serkan returns to focus only on his work, which gradually separates him from Eda. She goes to Italy to complete her studies, while Serkan continues with his life. But when they finally meet again after 5 long years, life has a surprise for both of them. Eda has a daughter named Kiraz. Serkan meets her when he attends Pırıl's meeting and is stopped on the way by Kiraz. He drops Kiraz home and meets with Eda. He has lunch with Eda and they both discuss their lives. Eda doesn't want Serkan to know that Kiraz is his daughter and lies that she is Melo and Burak's daughter. She asks Pırıl initially not to tell Serkan that Kiraz is Serkan's daughter, but Eda later reveals the truth to Serkan, and they get married. Eda gets pregnant and gives birth to their son Alp, named after Serkan's late brother.

== Episodes ==
Season	Episodes	Originally released	
Season	Episodes	First released	Last released
1	39	July 8, 2020	April 17, 2021
2	13	June 9, 2021	September 8, 2021

No. overall	No. in series	Title	Directed by	Written by	Original release date
1	1	"Chapter 1"	Ender Mihlar & Yusuf Pirhasan	Ayse Kutlu, Yesim Citak & Dilek Iyigün	8 July 2020
Eda Yıldız, a young and passionate florist who lost her scholarship during her last year of university due to Serkan Bolat, a wealthy and successful businessman who is also an architect at Art Life. Eda despises Serkan for his role in her lost scholarship and blames him for her current financial situation. While attending a graduation ceremony, Eda attempts to seek revenge on Serkan by vandalizing his car. However, their encounter takes an unexpected turn when she handcuff them together and are forced to spend the rest of the day stuck together. The next day, Eda finds herself working as a flight attendant on a private jet that Serkan is traveling on. When she becomes claustrophobic, Serkan helps her out and they become closer. However, their closeness raises eyebrows, especially when Serkan introduces Eda as his girlfriend at his ex-girlfriend's engagement party. As rumors of their supposed relationship start to spread, Serkan offers Eda a deal to pretend to be his girlfriend for two months in exchange for her scholarship. Eda refuses the offer, but when her boyfriend, Jenk, breaks up with her, in a moment of desperation, Eda kisses Serkan, causing even more confusion and drama.
2	2	"Chapter 2"	Altan Dönmez	Ayse Kutlu, Yesim Citak & Dilek Iyigün	15 July 2020
During a critical press conference about an international investment, Eda unexpectedly kissed Serkan, causing a major disruption. Now, Serkan must save face and restore his reputation, while Eda is left to fix the mistake she made. They come up with a plan to pretend to be engaged for two months, with Serkan hoping to make his ex-girlfriend Selin jealous and Eda taking a job as Serkan's assistant. However, Eda must convince everyone that the man she despised is now her fiancé. To make matters more complicated, Serkan announces his engagement party to prevent a client from leaving town. Meanwhile, Eda meets Kaan Karadağ, Serkan's business rival, and he invites himself to the engagement party. As the engagement party approaches, the question remains: will their plan succeed, or will it only bring them closer? Will Eda be able to maintain her facade as Serkan's fiancé, or will their arrangement unravel in the face of unexpected challenges?
3	3	"Chapter 3"	Altan Dönmez	Ayse Kutlu, Yesim Citak & Dilek Iyigün	22 July 2020
The news of Serkan Bolat and Eda Yildiz's engagement spreads like wildfire throughout society. Everyone is curious about Eda's background, her education, and her profession, causing her to feel overwhelmed and scrutinized. Despite this, Serkan begins to see Eda in a different light and tries to break the ice between them. However, at the same time, he also wants her to keep her distance. Meanwhile, Kaan Karadağ (played by Alican Aytekin), who is determined to ruin Serkan befriends Melo and takes her to a restaurant, where she notices Serkan and his ex-girlfriend Selin. This encounter makes Melo doubt the sincerity of Serkan's feelings for Eda. Back at the office, Eda is bombarded with calls from her crying Melo, Aydan, and even Selin. But what exactly caused Eda to faint?
4	4	"Chapter 4"	Altan Dönmez	Ayse Kutlu, Yesim Citak & Dilek Iyigün	22 July 2020
Eda is overwhelmed with stress after receiving a series of bad news and falls asleep in Serkan's arms. But their fake engagement is facing a serious problem as Eda accidentally told Serkan's ex-girlfriend, Selin, that they are living together. Selin and Ferit, plan to visit them at home, and Eda and Serkan have to scramble to prepare for their arrival. However, they face an unexpected obstacle as they do not have a house to show them. As the clock ticks down, Serkan and Eda manage the finish all the preparations. Meanwhile, Eda's friends catch Selin and Serkan together and are convinced that there is something going on between them. Despite Eda's attempts to reassure them, her friends' suspicions make her feel even more stressed and anxious. As the day of Selin and Ferit's visit approaches, Eda tries to do everything in her power to host them as best she can. However, she receives some unexpected news from an unexpected source that pushes her to the brink of her patience. In the end, things spiral out of control, and their secret is at stake.
5	5	"Chapter 5"	Altan Dönmez	Ayse Kutlu, Yesim Citak & Dilek Iyigün	22 July 2020
Eda, Serkan, Selin, Ferit, Engin, and Peryl travel to Antalya to finalize an important contract. However, the two investors who need to sign the contract are in the midst of a divorce and do not want to be in the same room together. Eda and Serkan work hard to convince them to sign, failing to realize how much the investors' mirror them. As they explore the city at night, Eda and Serkan share some magical moments together, deepening their connection. However, their happiness is short-lived as news of Eda's engagement contract is leaked to the press, but with false information. As Eda tries to fix everything, she faces the harsh reality of being in the public eye and the consequences of her fake engagement with Serkan. Will she be able to salvage her reputation and keep up the charade, or will this leak be the end of her engagement contract?
6	6	"Chapter 6"	Altan Dönmez	Ayse Kutlu, Yesim Citak & Dilek Iyigün	19 August 2020
Eda and Serkan's relationship takes a turn as they return home from their ordeal with the paparazzi. Things become even more complicated when Serkan goes missing the next day, and only Selin knows his whereabouts. Eda is left to wonder what is going on. Meanwhile, an old client of Art Life presents Eda with an unusual request that seems almost impossible. Despite the odds, she agrees to take on the task, but when Serkan finds out, he becomes angry and the office becomes divided with Serkan and Eda on opposite sides. Despite their differences, the night ends with a sweet surprise when Eda and Serkan end up in bed together. Has Serkan started to feel something more for Eda? As the tension between Eda and Serkan continues to build, it remains to be seen what will happen next. Will their relationship continue to evolve, and will he reveal about his disappearance?
7	7	"Chapter 7"	Altan Dönmez	Ayse Kutlu, Yesim Citak & Dilek Iyigün	26 August 2020
Serkan opens up to Eda and reveals a special secret to her. The following day is Serkan's birthday, according to rumors he will celebrate it with Selin. Eda wants to celebrate with him, but when Serkan asks her to make a bouquet for Selin instead, she feels disappointed. Meanwhile, Serkan has some designs that need to be patented, and Eda takes on the task to avoid being around him. However, when Melo brings Kaan to Eda's home and he sees the file, he takes pictures, setting the stage for a potential conflict. Despite having dinner with Selin, Serkan misses Eda and ends up spending his birthday with her. As they enjoy happy days as friends, Kaan is planning something that could change everything. With tensions rising and secrets being revealed, it remains to be seen what the future holds for Eda and Serkan. Will their friendship turn into something more, or will outside forces keep them apart?
8	8	"Chapter 8"	Altan Dönmez	Ayse Kutlu, Yesim Citak & Dilek Iyigün	2 September 2020
Serkan is devastated to find out that his designs have been leaked and he immediately blames Eda for it. Eda, feeling hurt and betrayed by Serkan's accusation, promises to find proof of her innocence and declares that Serkan will never see her face again. Eda is determined to clear her name and find evidence of who actually leaked the designs. However, she is called to the office since she has the power of attorney for the designs and needs to sign them back to the company. She tries to avoid Serkan but eventually meets him at the office. Meanwhile, Kaan meets Melo and her friends at their house for dinner. They later find out that Kaan was the one who stole the designs when he and Melo came to her house earlier. Melo and Fifi trick him and gather all the proof they need. In addition, Ferit and Selin's relationship begins to crumble when she lies to him about her whereabouts. Ferit also reveals to Eda that he was responsible for the engagement contract leak. The next day, Eda hands Serkan the proof of her innocence, but their relationship remains strained. Despite this, Serkan is still drawn to Eda and realizes that he cant let her go yet. The question remains whether Eda will forgive him and they can rebuild their relationship or if she will leave Serkan forever.
9	9	"Chapter 9"	Altan Dönmez	Ayse Kutlu, Yesim Citak & Dilek Iyigün	9 September 2020
Eda gives the engagement ring back to Serkan and decides to vanish from his life forever. Serkan, determined to apologize, searches for her relentlessly until he finally finds her. However, Eda refuses to see him until Serkan decides to handcuff them together. While at Serkan's mountain house, Eda releases her pent-up anger at him, and despite his numerous apologies, she remains unforgiving. Eventually, they discuss their issues and end up sharing a bed when they become stranded due to the rain. After returning home, Eda agrees to continue pretending to be Serkan's fiancé until the contract ends. Later, Seyfi informs Serkan that Eda helped Aydin leave the house for the first time in years. As Eda returns to the office, Serkan returns the ring to her, and Selin walks in with surprising news. What could it be? And is Serkan developing feelings for Eda as they continue to navigate their complex relationship?
10	10	"Chapter 10"	Altan Dönmez	Ayse Kutlu, Yesim Citak & Dilek Iyigün	16 September 2020
Eda gives the engagement ring back to Serkan and decides to vanish from his life forever. Serkan, determined to apologize, searches for her relentlessly until he finally finds her. However, Eda refuses to see him until Serkan decides to handcuff them together. While at Serkan's mountain house, Eda releases her pent-up anger at him, and despite his numerous apologies, she remains unforgiving. Eventually, they discuss their issues and end up sharing a bed when they become stranded due to the rain. After returning home, Eda agrees to continue pretending to be Serkan's fiancé until the contract ends. Later, Seyfi informs Serkan that Eda helped Aydin leave the house for the first time in years. As Eda returns to the office, Serkan returns the ring to her, and Selin walks in with surprising news. What could it be? And is Serkan developing feelings for Eda as they continue to navigate their complex relationship?
11	11	"Chapter 11"	Altan Dönmez	Ayse Kutlu, Yesim Citak & Dilek Iyigün	23 September 2020
Selin expresses her willingness to leave Ferit for Serkan, saying, "I'll leave Ferit if there's any hope for us to be together," which Eda overhears. While Eda is convinced that Serkan will agree, Serkan believes Eda no longer wants him. As a result, Eda decides to separate herself from Serkan and begins the process of rebuilding her life, including reapplying for scholarships.
12	12	"Chapter 12"	Altan Dönmez	Ayse Kutlu, Yesim Citak & Dilek Iyigün	30 September 2020
13	13	"Chapter 13"	Altan Dönmez	Ayse Kutlu, Yesim Citak & Dilek Iyigün	7 October 2020
14	14	"Chapter 14"	Altan Dönmez	Ayse Kutlu, Yesim Citak & Dilek Iyigün	14 October 2020
15	15	"Chapter 15"	Altan Dönmez	Ayse Kutlu, Yesim Citak & Dilek Iyigün	21 October 2020
16	16	"Chapter 16"	Altan Dönmez	Ayse Kutlu, Yesim Citak & Dilek Iyigün	28 October 2020
17	17	"Chapter 17"	Altan Dönmez	Ayse Kutlu, Yesim Citak & Dilek Iyigün	4 November 2020
18	18	"Chapter 18"	Altan Dönmez	Ayse Kutlu, Yesim Citak & Dilek Iyigün	11 November 2020
19	19	"Chapter 19"	Altan Dönmez	Ayse Kutlu, Yesim Citak & Dilek Iyigün	21 November 2020
20	20	"Chapter 20"	Altan Dönmez	Ayse Kutlu, Yesim Citak & Dilek Iyigün	28 November 2020
21	21	"Chapter 21"	Altan Dönmez	Ayse Kutlu, Yesim Citak & Dilek Iyigün	5 December 2020
22	22	"Chapter 22"	Altan Dönmez	Günsu Teker, Fikret Bekler, Kerim Ceylan & Elif Özsüt	12 December 2020
23	23	"Chapter 23"	Altan Dönmez	Günsu Teker, Fikret Bekler, Kerim Ceylan & Elif Özsüt	19 December 2020
24	24	"Chapter 24"	Altan Dönmez	Ayşe Üner Kutlu, Yeşim Çıtak, Dilek İyigün & Erdem Açıkgöz	26 December 2020
25	25	"Chapter 25"	Altan Dönmez	Günsu Teker, Fikret Bekler, Kerim Ceylan & Elif Özsüt	2 January 2021
26	26	"Chapter 26"	Altan Dönmez	Günsu Teker, Fikret Bekler, Kerim Ceylan & Elif Özsüt	9 January 2021
27	27	"Chapter 27"	Altan Dönmez	Günsu Teker, Fikret Bekler, Kerim Ceylan & Elif Özsüt	16 January 2021
28	28	"Chapter 28"	Altan Dönmez	Günsu Teker, Fikret Bekler, Kerim Ceylan & Elif Özsüt	23 January 2021
29	29	"Chapter 29"	Altan Dönmez	Günsu Teker, Fikret Bekler, Kerim Ceylan & Elif Özsüt	30 January 2021
30	30	"Chapter 30"	Altan Dönmez	Günsu Teker, Fikret Bekler, Kerim Ceylan & Elif Özsüt	6 February 2021
31	31	"Chapter 31"	Altan Dönmez	Duygu Tankaş & Tunus Taşcı	13 February 2021
32	32	"Chapter 32"	Altan Dönmez	Duygu Tankaş, Tunus Taşcı, Tufan Bora & Melek Ordu	20 February 2021
33	33	"Chapter 33"	Altan Dönmez	Duygu Tankaş, Tunus Taşcı, Tufan Bora & Melek Ordu	27 February 2021
34	34	"Chapter 34"	Altan Dönmez	Duygu Tankaş, Tunus Taşcı, Tufan Bora & Melek Ordu	6 March 2021
35	35	"Chapter 35"	Altan Dönmez	Duygu Tankaş, Tunus Taşcı, Tufan Bora & Melek Ordu	13 March 2021
36	36	"Chapter 36"	Altan Dönmez	Duygu Tankaş, Tunus Taşcı, Tufan Bora & Melek Ordu	20 March 2021
37	37	"Chapter 37"	Altan Dönmez	Duygu Tankaş, Tunus Taşcı, Tufan Bora & Melek Ordu	27 March 2021
38	38	"Chapter 38"	Altan Dönmez	Günsu Teker, Fikret Bekler, Kerim Ceylan & Elif Özsüt	3 April 2021
39	39	"Chapter 39 (Season Finale)"	Altan Dönmez	Günsu Teker, Fikret Bekler, Kerim Ceylan & Elif Özsüt	17 April 2021

No. overall	No. in series	Title	Directed by	Written by	Original release date
40	1	"Chapter 40"	Altan Dönmez	Ayşe Üner Kutlu, Deniz Gürlek & Melek Seven	9 June 2021
41	2	"Chapter 41"	Altan Dönmez	Ayşe Üner Kutlu, Deniz Gürlek & Melek Seven	16 June 2021
42	3	"Chapter 42"	Altan Dönmez	Ayşe Üner Kutlu, Deniz Gürlek & Melek Seven	23 June 2021
43	4	"Chapter 43"	Altan Dönmez	Ayşe Üner Kutlu, Deniz Gürlek & Melek Seven	30 June 2021
44	5	"Chapter 44"	Altan Dönmez	Ayşe Üner Kutlu, Deniz Gürlek & Melek Seven	7 July 2021
45	6	"Chapter 45"	Altan Dönmez	Ayşe Üner Kutlu, Deniz Gürlek & Melek Seven	14 July 2021
46	7	"Chapter 46"	Altan Dönmez	Ayşe Üner Kutlu, Deniz Gürlek & Melek Seven	28 July 2021
47	8	"Chapter 47"	Altan Dönmez	Ayşe Üner Kutlu, Deniz Gürlek & Melek Seven	4 August 2021
48	9	"Chapter 48"	Altan Dönmez	Ayşe Üner Kutlu, Deniz Gürlek & Melek Seven	11 August 2021
49	10	"Chapter 49"	Altan Dönmez	Ayşe Üner Kutlu, Deniz Gürlek & Melek Seven	18 August 2021
50	11	"Chapter 50"	Altan Dönmez	Ayşe Üner Kutlu, Deniz Gürlek & Melek Seven	25 August 2021
51	12	"Chapter 51"	Altan Dönmez	Ayşe Üner Kutlu, Deniz Gürlek & Melek Seven	1 September 2021
52	13	"Chapter 52 (Final)"	Altan Dönmez	Ayşe Üner Kutlu, Deniz Gürlek & Melek Seven	8 September 2021

== Cast ==
=== Main characters ===
- Eda Yıldız (episodes 1–52), played by Hande Erçel.

A dreamer who is passionate about flowers, Eda lives with the pain of the premature loss of her parents. She has a bitter enemy: Serkan Bolat. In fact, he canceled her scholarship, preventing her from graduating as a landscape architect and studying in Italy. That's why she works in her aunt's flower shop, who raised her and has treated her like her own daughter. They share a home with Eda's childhood friend, Melo.

- Serkan Bolat (episodes 1–52), played by Kerem Bürsin.

Hypochondriac, obsessive, cold and workaholic, Serkan Bolat is a wealthy internationally renowned architect, owner of Art Life, intent on preventing the marriage of his ex-girlfriend, Selin. To do this, he proposes to Eda to pretend to be his fiancée for two months: once the contract has expired, he will reinstate her scholarship.

- Engin Sezgin (episodes 1-52), played by Anıl İlter. He is Serkan's best friend and eventually marries Pırıl with whom he has a son Can.
- Pırıl Baytekin (episodes 1–52), played by Başak Gümülcinelioğlu. One of Serkan's friends. She later becomes close to Eda as well. She eventually marries and has a son with Engin. She is a fine architect and has a career-oriented outlook not unlike that of Serkan.
- Melek "Melo" Yücel (episodes 1–52) played by Elçin Afacan. She has been one of Eda's close friends since childhood as well as her housemate. She is a dreamer and generally funny. Her dream is to find true love.
- Ceren Başar (episodes 1–37) played by Melisa Döngel. She is one of Eda's friends. She grew up in a wealthy family of lawyers and was forced to become a lawyer too. However, her dream is to become a shoe designer. She is a fashion icon. Ceren dates Selin's ex-fiancé, eventually marrying him and becoming pregnant.
- Figen Yıldırım / Fifi (episodes 1-28), played by M. Sitare Akbas. She is also one of Eda's friends and regularly wears black clothing.
- Selin Atakan (episodes 1–22, 29–38), played by Bige Önal. Serkan's former girlfriend and childhood friend, she is the PR of the company and his partner in the family business built by their fathers. She is Eda's main antagonist.
- Ferit Şimşek (episodes 1-39), played by Çağrı Çıtanak. Selin's former fiancé. He is originally the reason for Eda and Serkan's fake engagement as Serkan did not trust Ferit. After his breakup with Selin, he begins a relationship with Ceren.
- Leyla Haktan (episodes 1-39) played by Ilkyaz Arslan. She is Serkan's assistant.
- Erdem Şangay (episodes 1-52), played by Sarp Bozkurt. He is Engin's assistant.
- Deniz Saraçhan (episodes 29–37), played by Sarp Can Köroğlu. He's been friends with Eda since elementary school. He initially helps her in her romance with Serkan but is secretly in love with her.
- Alexander Zucco (episodes 24–27, 29–34), played by Hakan Karahan. He is a world famous chef who has a love triangle with Ayfer and Aydan.
- Semiha Yıldırım (episodes 23–28), played by Ayşegül İşsever. She is Eda's paternal grandmother. Extremely rich, she has always frowned upon Eda's parents' marriage and does not appreciate her bond with Serkan Bolat.
- Tahir (episodes 23–28), played by Buğrahan Çayır. He is Semiha's personal bodyguard.
- Balca Koçak (episodes 22–28), played by İlayda Çevik. Following Selin, she briefly serves as PR of Serkan's company and is Eda's adversary.
- Prens Seymen (episodes 25–26), played by Mert Öcal. As Serkan's rival for Eda, he becomes infatuated with Eda because she resembles his lost love.
- Efe Akman (episodes 13–21), played by Ali Ersan Duru. He is a highly acclaimed architect abroad who becomes a partner in Serkan's company for a short time.
- Kaan Karadağ (episodes 1–10), played by İsmail Ege Şaşmaz. Once a college friend of Serkan, he now he hates him deeply and is always competing with him in the professional space. He is Ferit's best friend.
- Kiraz Bolat (episodes 40–52), played by Maya Başol. She is Serkan and Eda's daughter.
- Burak Balcı (episodes 40–52), played by Sinan Helvacı. A close friend of Eda who is secretly platonically in love with her and gets along really well with Kiraz.
- Ayfer Yıldız (episode 1-52), played by Evrim Doğan. She is Eda's caring aunt and operates her own flower shop.
- Aydan Bolat (episode 1-52), played by Neslihan Yeldan. She is Serkan's mother. She is housebound given a past traumatic incident.
- Seyfi Çiçek (episode 1-52), played by Alican Aytekin. He is the Bolat Family's butler.
- Kemal Özcan (episode 34-52), played by Sinan Albayrak. As Aydan's first love, he returns to reunite with his long lost love.

== Reception ==
The series debuted in the summer of 2021 in Italy, in daytime on Canale 5, with good success. In September 2021, it was confirmed that the second season would air on Canale 5.

In Spain, the series initially aired on Telecinco. After initially producing views below expectations, it was moved to Divinity, where it aired in the afternoon, standing out and enjoying great success, becoming an unexpected "summery talisman" in the 2021 summer. In September 2021, during the broadcast of the series finale, Love Is in the Air's episode became the most tweeted in history, beating the previous record of 7.8 million tweets set by Game of Thrones' The Long Night.
