= Burcu Biricik =

Turkish actress (born 1989)

- Biricik in 2017
- Born: 4 May 1989 (age 37); Elmalı, Turkey
- Occupation: Actress
- Years active: 2007–present
- Spouse: Emre Yetkin (m. 2016)
- Children: 1

Burcu Biricik Yetkin (born 4 May 1989) is a Turkish actress.

== Early life ==
Biricik was born on 4 May 1989 in Elmalı, Antalya Province. She is of Yörük descent, which is a Turkic ethnic subgroup.

After participating at a theater festival and winning an award, she decided to become an actress, and after receiving a bachelor's degree in archeology from Ege University, she received acting training at the Bornova Municipal City Theater. In 2006, at the beauty competition Miss Mediterranean in Antalya she was chosen as Akdeniz's beauty.

Biricik began her acting career by taking part in the internship at Bornova Municipal City Theater. There she took part in plays such as İkinin Biri, Yaşlı Hanımın Ziyareti, Gözlerimi Kaparım, Vazifemi Yaparım and Yedi Kocalı Hürmüz. She had her first uncredited TV roles in the series Maçolar (2006) and Ümit Milli (2006).

== Career ==
She had guest roles in the historical series Muhteşem Yüzyıl (2011) and period series Ustura Kemal (2011) based on a comic book.

Her first leading role was in the romantic comedy series Düşman Kardeşler opposite Kaan Urgancıoğlu. She gained further fame with her portrayal of Seda in the popular youth series Beni Böyle Sev. She also had a role in Şeref Meselesi, an adaptation of an Italian drama series, with Kerem Bürsin and Şükrü Özyıldız.

Her antihero performance with a remarkable sense of psychology and humour in Hayat Şarkısı was well received by the critics. With Buğra Gülsoy, she played in 8. Gün. She had shared the leading role in Kuzgun with Barış Arduç.

With Feyyaz Şerifoğlu, she played a schizophrenic in Kırmızı Oda. Later, they appeared together in Camdaki Kız. She also played the role of a serial killer in the Netflix series Fatma.

=== Films ===
She had leading roles in festival-premiered films İnanç Odası, Çok Uzak Fazla Yakın, İnsanlar İkiye Ayrılır, and Toprak'ın Günlüğü. She received critical acclaim and won numerous accolades, including Mannheim Turkish Film Festival Best Actress Award and was nominated for the Seoul Best Actress Awards.

She had a role in Herşey Seninle Güzel, a remake of My Best Friend's Wedding. She played in the period film Çiçero. She had guest roles in comedy films Kedi Özledi, Bana Masal Anlatma, Feride, and Oregon.

== Filmography ==
Film
| Year | Title | Role | Note |
|---|---|---|---|
| 2013 | Kedi Özledi | Lale | Supporting role |
| 2013 | İnanç Odası | Kurban | Leading role |
| 2014 | Bana Masal Anlatma | Ezgi | Supporting role |
| 2015 | Toprak'ın Günlüğü | Toprak | Leading role (short film) |
| 2016 | Çok Uzak Fazla Yakın | Aslı | Leading role |
| 2017 | Herşey Seninle Güzel | Deniz Sağlam | Leading role |
| 2019 | Çiçero | Cornelia Kapp | Leading role |
| 2020 | İnsanlar İkiye Ayrılır | Duygu | Leading role |
| 2020 | Feride | Fashion Designer | Supporting role |
| 2023 | Oregon | Selen | Supporting role |
Web Series
| Year | Title | Role | Note |
| 2021 | Fatma | Fatma Yılmaz | Leading role |
Tv Series
| Year | Title | Role | Note |
| 2006 | Maçolar | Secretary | uncredit |
| 2006 | Ümit Milli | | uncredit |
| 2011 | Muhteşem Yüzyıl | Menekşe Hatun | Guest |
| 2011 | Ustura Kemal | Meriç | Guest |
| 2012 | Düşman Kardeşler | Derya | Leading role |
| 2013–2014 | Beni Böyle Sev | Seda Alataş | Supporting Role |
| 2014 | Ulan İstanbul | Kübra Güngör | Guest role |
| 2014 | Şeref Meselesi | Kübra Güngör | Leading role |
| 2015–2017 | Hayat Şarkısı | Hülya Çamoğlu Cevher | Leading role |
| 2018 | 8. Gün | Bahar Yüksel | Leading role |
| 2019 | Kuzgun | Dila Bilgin | Leading role |
| 2020–2021 | Kırmızı Oda | Boncuk | Guest role |
| 2021–2023 | Camdaki Kız | Nalan İpekoğlu | Leading role |
