= Alphan Eşeli =

Turkish film director (born 1973)

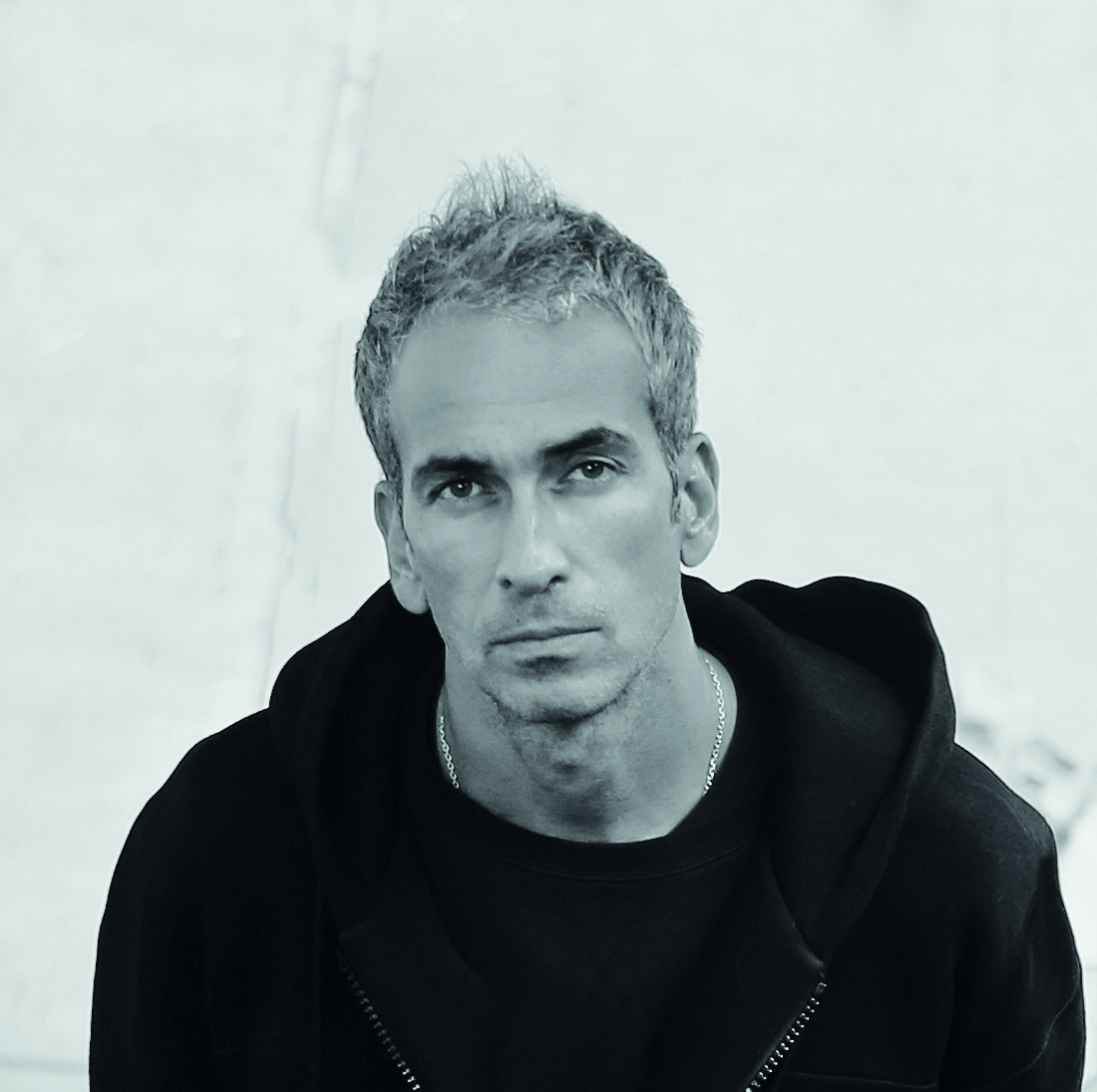
Alphan Eşeli

Alphan Eseli (Turkish: [Alphan Eşeli]); born March 7, 1973, is a Turkish film director, screenwriter, producer, and photographer. Eseli's critically acclaimed first feature film The Long Way Home (2013) won the Fipresci Prize and the Golden Zenith Award at the 37th Montreal World Film Festival as well as the Best New Talent Award at the 7th Hong Kong Asian Film Festival.

He is the co-founder of ISTANBUL’74 and produced the first Istanbul International Arts and Culture Festival founded by Liberatum and Pablo Ganguli.

== Early life and education ==
Eşeli was born in Ankara, Turkey. His father worked as a diplomat for the Turkish government. Soon after, they moved to Munich, Germany where he spent his childhood. His early influences about cinema were formed here. After graduating from college, Eşeli moved to New York City to study film. He graduated from the New York Institute of Technology with a Master of Arts in filmmaking.

== Career ==
After graduating from college, Eşeli started directing commercials and music videos. He went on to direct many award-winning commercials for major Turkish brands. Early in his career, Eşeli also worked as a fashion photographer. He has shot fashion ad campaigns with world-renowned stars such as Gisele Bundchen, Frankie Rayder, Erin Wasson, Angela Lindvall, Olivier Martinez, and more.

In 2011, Eşeli directed the music video for the American alternative rock band Hole for their single "Samantha." Set in a post-apocalyptic world, the video was shot in an abandoned industrial factory on the outskirts of Istanbul. Inspired by Tracey Emin's "Sometimes the Dress is Worth More Money Than the Money", the music video features lead singer of Hole, Courtney Love wearing a wedding dress with the word "cunt" embroidered on it. She is shown burning her possessions and running away.

Eşeli made his feature film debut with The Long Way Home (original title: Turkish: Eve Dönüş Sarıkamış 1915), which he wrote and directed. Set in the Eastern Anatolian highlands during the brutal winter of 1915, the film chronicles a band of survivors trying to make their way home after the deadly Battle of Sarikamish. The film scrutinizes how far people can go to survive when threatened by war, starvation, and freezing cold

The film is dedicated to Eseli's grandfather who had participated in the Battle of Sarikamish. The original score of the film was composed by Hungarian musician Mihály Víg - known for his collaborations with director Béla Tarr on films including The Turin Horse and Werckmeister Harmonies.

On March 8, 2013, The Long Way Home opened nationwide in 77 theaters and premiered in several international film festivals, receiving praise from critics and audiences alike. The film won a number of awards, including the Fipresci Award for the Best First Feature Film and The Golden Zenith for the Best First Fiction Feature Film at the Montreal World Film Festival. It has won the New Talent Award at the 7th Hong Kong Asia Film Festival and was nominated for the prestigious Sutherland Award for Best Feature Film at the 57th BFI London Film Festival. Additionally, it received the Special Jury Prize Award, Best Actor Award, and the Audience Award at the 4th Malatya International Film Festival as well as the Best Art Direction Award and Best Music Original Score at the 20th International Adana Film Festival.

In 2015, he directed "Little Bullets," a short film that follows a Syrian mother and his daughter who are forced to flee their war-torn country. The film initially started as a project in collaboration with the European Commission of Human Rights. For this project, five Turkish filmmakers were asked to shoot a short film surrounding the topic of human rights, and Alphan Eşeli was one of them. "Little Bullets" made its international premiere at 43rd Telluride Film Festival. The film was also screened as part of the official selection at the 54th New York Film Festival and Palm Springs International Film Festival.

In 2016, Eşeli wrote and directed the fantasy-thriller short film "Mia," which became the eight-episode web series Yaşamayanlar (English: [Immortals]). Spanning one night, the film focuses on the story of a vampire girl Mia and Ayşe from a conservative family in the political atmosphere of Istanbul at that time.

In 2017, Eşeli directed the drama/science-fiction episode "Procedure" of the acclaimed Turkish web series 7 Faces (7 Yüz). The same year, he directed the controversial vampire-themed music video for the Turkish Hip-Hop artist Ezhel's hit song "Geceler".

In 2018, loosely inspired by his short film "Mia", Eşeli wrote and directed Yaşamayanlar (English: [Immortals]), the first Turkish vampire drama web series. Comprising eight episodes, the series premiered on BluTV, a major streaming platform in Turkey. Eşeli also served as a producer on the show. The series follows the story of Mia, a 200-year-old vampire who comes to Istanbul to take revenge from the vampire who has transformed her into a bloodsucking creature. There she finds herself torn in an Underworld filled with corrupt businessmen, insurgent youth gangs living on the Outskirts, and hidden vampires who fight for their existence in the modern world. The series came to the fore especially with its Istanbul underground culture and hip-hop themes. In 2019, Yaşamayanlar was bought by Netflix and distributed worldwide as a Netflix Original.

In 2019, he directed "Müjde" part of the anthology film, Once Upon A Time In The Middle East.

== Personal life ==
Alphan Eseli lives with his wife, Creative Director Demet Müftüoğlu Eşeli in Istanbul, Turkey.

In 2009, Eşeli co-founded the multidisciplinary arts and culture platform ISTANBUL’74 with his wife, Demet Müftüoğlu Eşeli. The following year, they produced the Istanbul International Arts and Culture Festival (IST. Festival) for Pablo Ganguli and Liberatum. It is an annual, three-day festival that offers a hybrid program of panels and talks, exhibitions, workshops, screenings, and performances that aim to establish and forge cultural and artistic relations, by bringing together some of the world's most talented and creative minds.

IST. Festival has broadened its reach to a wider global audience, launching new biannual editions in 2019. The first one IST.FEST.ROME premiered in MAXXI Museum, Rome in May 2019. Previous participants include Zaha Hadid, Gore Vidal, JR, Terry Gilliam, Tilda Swinton, Harvey Keitel, Kirsten Dunst, Michael Stipe, Jefferson Hack, Carine Roitfeld, Stefano Tonchi, Franca Sozzani, and many more.

== Accolades ==
Little Bullets

Official Selection at 54th New York Film Festival 2016

Official Selection at 43rd Telluride Film Festival 2016 Telluride Film Festival

Official Selection at 2017 Palm Springs International Short Film Festival

The Long Way Home

Festivals	Winner	Nominee
Adana Film Festivali	Golden Boll in National Feature Film Best Art Direction Best Original Score	
Annonay International Festival of First Films		Grand Jury Prize
Haifa International Film Festival		Golden Anchor Award
Hong Kong Asian Film Festival	New Talent Award	
BFI London Film Festival		Sutherland Award First Feature Competition
Madrid İnternational Film Festival		Festival Award Best Foreign Language Feature Film
Malatya İnternational Film Festival	Crystal Apricot Award Best Actor Special Jury Award Hayk Kirakosyan Kemal Sunal Public Award	
Montréal World Film Festival	FIPRESCI Prize First Films Competition Golden Zenith Alphan Eşeli	
Sadri Alisik Theatre and Cinema Awards	Sadri Alisik Cinema Award Best Performance by an Actor in a Motion Picture - Drama Serdar Orçin	Sadri Alisik Cinema Award Best Performance by an Actor in a Motion Picture - Drama Uğur Polat
Turkish Film Critics Association (SIYAD) Awards		Best Music Best Actor Best Cinematography Best Art Direction
