= Ya Çok Seversen =

Turkish romantic drama television series

- Genre: Romance; Comedy
- Screenplay by: Kübra Sülün
- Story by: Kübra Sülün
- Directed by: Ali Bilgin; Beste Sultan Kasapoğulları; Ali Balcı
- Starring: Kerem Bürsin; Hafsanur Sancaktutan
- Theme music composer: Güldiyar Tanrıdağlı
- Country of origin: Turkey
- Original language: Turkish
- No. of seasons: 1
- No. of episodes: 13

Production
- Executive producers: Cem Baydur; Kerem Çatay
- Production location: Istanbul
- Running time: 120 minutes
- Production company: Ay Yapım

Original release
- Network: Kanal D
- Release: July 6 – September 30, 2023

Ya Çok Seversen (known internationally as: If You Love) is a Turkish romantic drama television series produced by Ay Yapım. The show premiered on July 6, 2023 and ended on September 30, 2023. The series is directed by Ali Bilgin and Beste Sultan Kasapoğulları and written by Kübra Sülün. It stars Kerem Bürsin and Hafsanur Sancaktutan in the leading roles.

== Synopsis ==
"Ya Çok Seversen" tells the story of Ateş, who was sent away to a boarding school at a young age after his mother's death and never returned to his family home. He has spent his life independently abroad, lacking trust in anyone. On the other hand, the beautiful Leyla has never known her real family and makes a living by deceiving people for money. The series explores their intersecting paths and the journey of love and trust that unfolds as they come together.

== Cast and characters ==
- Kerem Bürsin - Ateş Arcalı
- Hafsanur Sancaktutan - Leyla Kökdal
- Hatice Aslan - Füsun Arcalı
- Şerif Erol - İlter Evcili
- Cemre Ebüzziya - Bige
- Nazmi Kırık - Yakup Civelek
- Aziz Caner İnan - Umut Arcalı
- Mine Kılıç - Meryem Yunus
- Oğulcan Arman Uslu - Onur
- Durukan Çelikkaya - Barış
- Özgün Akaçça - Mert
- Lara Aslan - Ilgaz Arcalı
- Adin Külçe - Aydos Arcalı
- Arven Ece Yavuz - Berit Arcalı
- Esra Kızıldoğan - Firuze

== Overview ==
Season	Episodes	Start Date	End Date	Network
1	13	6 July 2023	30 September 2023	Kanal D

- Note: The series aired on Thursdays at 20:00 from Episode 1 to 8, and it continues to air on Saturdays at 20:00 starting from Episode 9.

== Episodes ==
No.	Title	Directed by	Written by	Original release date
1	"Episode"	Ali Bilgin, Beste Sultan, Kasapoğulları	Kübra Sülün	6 July 2023
As Ateş plans to return after the will is revealed, an unexpected surprise from his father alters his decision. Leyla, after losing a family heirloom, unwittingly boards a car that will lead to a fateful encounter with Ateş. Both are unaware that their lives are about to change dramatically.
2	"Episode"	Ali Bilgin, Beste Sultan, Kasapoğulları	Kübra Sülün	13 July 2023
Ateş's unexpected return home surprises Leyla and the kids. Their lives are further complicated by the need to live with siblings due to a family constitution. Ateş takes drastic steps both at home and in the company. Meanwhile, a team member's secret actions pose risks. Berit's disappearance becomes crucial for Umut and Füsun's case. Ateş and Leyla find themselves in a tight spot, and their unity is tested as they search for Berit.
3	"Episode"	Ali Bilgin, Beste Sultan, Kasapoğulları	Kübra Sülün	20 July 2023
Ateş urges Leyla to return when he uncovers Ilgaz's scheme. Despite her unease, Leyla goes back home due to team pressure. Ateş and Leyla bond over Berit's trauma, and they grow closer. Yakup's surprise plan shakes Leyla. The company's mole suspicion strains Ateş and Umut's relationship. The Arcalı family unites to devise a crisis-solving plan with Leyla in the lead. The unexpected night's end marks a new chapter for Ateş and Leyla, but Leyla faces the risk of her true identity being exposed.
4	"Episode"	Ali Bilgin, Beste Sultan, Kasapoğulları	Kübra Sülün	27 July 2023
Misunderstandings lead Leyla to seek revenge on Ateş, but a game with the Arcalı siblings reveals the truth, mending their relationship. Ateş's decision regarding the children causes conflict with Leyla. A company mole sparks a crisis, with Leyla playing a key role. Yakup's secret plan and impending danger go unnoticed by the team, while Leyla faces the risk of her true identity being exposed.
5	"Episode"	Ali Bilgin, Beste Sultan, Kasapoğulları	Kübra Sülün	3 August 2023
The children must decide which brother to stay with, and Füsun tries to influence their choice. Ateş deals with Ilgaz's troubles and longs for his old life. Leyla attempts to mend their relationship, leading to jealousy between her and Ateş. Leyla's surprise leaves Ateş astonished.
6	"Episode"	Ali Bilgin, Beste Sultan, Kasapoğulları	Kübra Sülün	10 August 2023
Leyla and Ateş become even closer, though they are uncertain about their relationship. Berit refuses to give up on them despite the confusion. Füsun discovers surprising information about Leyla and pursues it, gaining an advantage. Berit's words unite Ateş and his siblings, bringing the whole family together.
7	"Episode"	Ali Bilgin, Beste Sultan, Kasapoğulları	Kübra Sülün	17 August 2023
Leyla and Ateş become a couple but keep it a secret to avoid confusing the children. Füsun unravels the gang's secret and introduces new games, bringing change. Umut and Bige's collaboration brings them closer. Ateş helps Aydos with social anxiety, bonding the family. Füsun continues with her plans, and Ateş stops hiding their relationship.
8	"Episode"	Ali Balcı	Kübra Sülün	24 August 2023
Ateş's confession about his relationship surprises everyone, as no one expected it. Ilgaz reacts strongly because he wants to protect his siblings. Although Leyla cancels the gang's plan due to her feelings, Yakup is hesitant to accept it. Their relationship changes all the dynamics around them.
9	"Episode"	Ali Balcı	Kübra Sülün	2 September 2023
Ateş proposes to Leyla, and Füsun joins them. They reveal their decision to the children. Ilgaz reacts strongly to the marriage, while Leyla is uncertain about what to do. Meryem confesses to Mert that they are con artists. Füsun tries to retrieve designs that could incriminate her gang. Leyla has a surprise waiting for her at the wedding.
10	"Episode"	Ali Balcı	Kübra Sülün	9 September 2023
After Ates's confession at the wedding, Leyla quickly leaves the place. On the way, one of the wedding attendees helps him. What he did actually upset Ates a lot. The gang's situation at home is in grave danger. The whole order is destroyed. Since the children are so used to Leyla, they start to have problems at home. Ates has to maintain some balance for custody.
11	"Episode"	Ali Balcı	Kübra Sülün	16 September 2023
Leyla is very surprised that Ates does not want a divorce. Although she doesn't know what to do, she agrees to play one last game with Ates. They do everything to convince at home of the truth of their marriage. In the process, Ates shares his true feelings with Leyla. He can't hold back much when he feels he has to protect his brothers. As they set up a game for the kids, Fusun sets it up for Leyla.
12	"Episode"	Ali Balcı	Kübra Sülün	23 September 2023
Ates and Leyla go on vacation together to make it good for the children. It is thought that they came to the hotel for their honeymoon. They decide to become friends on this holiday. This situation is very difficult for them because they are in love with each other. Ates learns that Firuze is the mother Leyla has been searching for for years.
13	"Episode"	Ali Balcı	Kübra Sülün	30 September 2023
The children go to Umut's house. Even though Ates realizes how much he loves them, he decides to go alone. Leyla shakes Ates's trust again and they come to a crossroads. Everything Füsun does is now revealed. The children's guardianship case is concluded.

== Awards and nominations ==
Year	Award	Category	Result	Ref
2023	Golden Butterfly Awards	Best Romantic Comedy TV Series	Won	
2023	Golden Butterfly Awards	Best Actor in a Romantic Comedy Series Kerem Bürsin	Won	
2023	Golden Butterfly Awards	Best Actress in a Romantic Comedy Series Hafsanur Sancaktutan	Won	
2023	Golden Butterfly Awards	Best Child Actor/Actress Arven Yavuz	Nominated	
2023	Golden Butterfly Awards	Best Child Actor/Actress Adin Külçe	Nominated	
2023	Ayakli Gazete TV Stars Awards	Best Romantic Comedy TV Series	Won	
2023	Ayakli Gazete TV Stars Awards	Best Actor in a Romantic Comedy Series Kerem Bürsin	Won	
2023	Ayakli Gazete TV Stars Awards	Best Actress in a Romantic Comedy Series Hafsanur Sancaktutan	Won	

== See also ==
- Television in Turkey
- List of Turkish television series
- Turkish television drama
