= Kuzgun (2019 TV series) =

- TV series poster
- Genre: Thriller
- Written by: Burcu Görgün; Özlem Yılmaz
- Directed by: Bahadır İnce
- Starring: Barış Arduç; Burcu Biricik
- Theme music composer: Toygar Işıklı
- Composer: Toygar Işıklı
- Country of origin: Turkey
- Original language: Turkish
- No. of seasons: 2
- No. of episodes: 21

Production
- Producers: Kerem Çatay; Pelin Diştaş
- Production location: Istanbul
- Running time: 130 minutes
- Production company: Ay Yapım

Original release
- Network: Star TV
- Release: 13 February – 16 October 2019

Kuzgun (transl. "Raven") is a Turkish thriller television series that started to be broadcast on Star TV on 13 February 2019, written by Burcu Görgün Toptaş and Özlem Yılmaz, directed by Bahadır İnce and starring Barış Arduç and Burcu Biricik. It ended with the 21st episode released on 16 October 2019, by making a final.

== Plot ==
Yusuf an honest policeman lives happily with his wife Meryem and three children, Kuzgun, Kartal and Kumru. One night Yusuf and his colleague Rifat are on a mission to capture Sheref, a drug lord, Sheref offers a bribe to Yusuf which he refuses, however Rifat accepts it as he needs money for treatment of his wife Sultan and betrays Yusuf which leads to Yusuf getting arrested. However, Yusuf has recorded everything in a tape. In order to get that tape Sheref's man take Kuzgun after being chosen by Meryem to be taken away but the latter manages to escape from them. He can not find his family at home and has to survive on the streets. Rifat becomes Sheref's partner.

20 years later, Kuzgun is ready for revenge. Kuzgun makes a plan to join the Rifat gang for which he goes after his daughter Dila, a lawyer who recently came back from London. To meet Dila, Kuzgun becomes her bodyguard without revealing his identity and saves her life. After that, he returns to Istanbul and reveals his identity to Dila and with her help, he starts working in Rifat's gang.

== Cast and characters ==
=== Main characters ===
| Actor | Character | Description | Episodes |
|---|---|---|---|
| Barış Arduç (Metehan Parıltı) | Kuzgun Cebeci/Adivar (Child Kuzgun) | Yusuf and Meryem's eldest son, Kartal and Kumru's elder brother, Dila's childhood lover turned husband | 1-21 |
| Burcu Biricik (Nisa Sofiya Aksongur) | Dila Bilgin/Cebeci/Adivar (Child Dila) | Rifat and Sultan's daughter, Ali's younger sister, Naz's stepsister, Kuzgun's childhood lover turned wife | 1–21 |

=== Supporting characters ===
| Actor | Character | Description | Episode |
|---|---|---|---|
| Baran Akbulut | Yusuf Cebeci/Adivar | Behram's son, Meryem's husband, Ferman, Kuzgun, Kartal and Kumru's father (dead) | 1–21 |
| Hatice Aslan (Emel Dede) | Meryem Cebeci/Adivar(Young Meryem) | Yusuf's wife, Kuzgun, Kartal and Kumru's mother | 1–21 |
| Caner Şahin (Mert İnce) | Kartal Cebeci/Adivar (Child Kartal) | Yusuf and Meryem's second son, Kuzgun's younger brother, Kumru's elder brother | 1–21 |
| Ahsen Eroğlu (Damla Cankurt) | Kumru Cebeci/Adivar (Child Kumru) | Yusuf and Meryem's daughter, Kuzgun and Kartal's younger sister | 1–21 |
| Levent Ülgen (Emre Kentmenoğlu) | Rıfat Bilgin (Young Rifat) | Sultan and Şermin's husband, Ali, Dila and Naz's father, Defne Bilgin grandfather (dead) | 1–15 |
| Bahar Kerimoğlu | Sultan Bilgin | Rifat's first wife, Ali and Dila's mother (dead) | 1–2, 7 |
| İpek Erdem | Şermin Dağistanli/Bilgin | Seref's younger sister, Rifat's second wife, Naz's mother | 1–21 |
| Aytek Şayan (Arda Şahin) | Ali Bilgin (Child Ali) | Rifat and Sultan's son, Dila's elder brother, Naz's stepbrother, Seda's husband, Defne's father | 1–21 |
| Derya Beşerler | Seda Bilgin | Ali's wife, Defne's mother | 1–21 |
| Almina Kahraman | Defne Bilgin | Ali and Seda's daughter | 1–21 |
| Su Burcu Yazgı Coşkun | Naz Bilgin | Rifat and Şermin's daughter, Ali and Dila's younger half sister | 1–16 |
| Settar Tanrıöğen | Derviş Cevheri/Behram Adıvar | Yusuf's father, Ferman, Kuzgun, Kartal and Kumru's grandfather, Head of criminal organisation (dead) | 1–16 |
| Erdal Küçükkömürcü (Raci Durak) | Şeref Dağistanli (Young Şeref) | Şermin's elder brother, Bora's father, Atlas's grandfather Kuzgun's enemy(dead) | 1–5 |
| Aykut Yilmaz | Selçuk | Dila's assistant, Kuzgun's enemy, Undercover police officer, Ferman'spy | 2-18 |
| Ahmet Varlı | Bora Dağistanli | Kuzgun's enemy Şeref's son, Atlas's father (dead) | 3–12 |
| Ferit Kaya | Cihan | Kuzgun's right hand man | 7–21 |
| Senan Kara | Kudret Șezinoğlu | Head of Department for combating organised crimes, Firat's mother (dead) | 8-16 |
| Onur Saylak (Batuhan Kumbasar) | Ferman Koruoğlu/Adivar (Child Ferman) | Yusuf and Gülşen's son | 17–21 |
| Nilperi Şahinkaya | Güneş | Neşe's daughter | 17–21 |
| Tülay Günal | Neşe | Gülşen's younger sister, Güneş's mother | 17–21 |

== Broadcast calendar ==
| Season | Screening day and time | Season start | Season final | Number of episodes shot | Partition range | TV season | TV channel |
|---|---|---|---|---|---|---|---|
| Season 1 | Wednesday 20:00 | 13 February 2019 | 29 May 2019 | 16 | 1–16 | 2019 | Star TV |
| Season 2 | Wednesday 20:00 | 18 September 2019 | 16 October 2019 (Final) | 5 | 17–21 | 2019 | Star TV |
