= Bu Şehir Arkandan Gelecek =

Turkish television series

- Genre: Drama; Romance; Action
- Written by: Ece Yörenç; Melek Gençoğlu
- Directed by: Çağrı Vila Lostuvalı
- Starring: Kerem Bürsin; Leyla Lydia Tuğutlu; Gürkan Uygun; Osman Alkaş; Defne Kayalar
- Theme music composer: Toygar Işıklı
- Composer: Toygar Işıklı
- Country of origin: Turkey
- Original language: Turkish
- No. of seasons: 1
- No. of episodes: 20

Production
- Producer: Kerem Çatay
- Production location: Istanbul
- Running time: 150 minutes
- Production company: Ay Yapım

Original release
- Network: ATV
- Release: 4 January – 14 June 2017

Bu Şehir Arkandan Gelecek (transl. "This City Will Come Behind You") is a Turkish television series signed by Ay Yapım, produced by Kerem Çatay, written by Ece Yörenç, directed by Çağrı Vila Lostuvalı, starring Kerem Bürsin, Leyla Lydia Tuğutlu and Gürkan Uygun. It ended on 14 June 2017 by making a final.

== Plot ==
Witnessing the death of his mother when he was only five years old, Ali is adopted and raised by Rauf, who is a cook on cargo ships. Working together on ships, they leave behind 24 years, Rauf is both a mother and father to Ali, dedicating his life to Ali to make him forget the trauma he experienced. For years, Ali has not wanted to work on ships that call to Istanbul. After the great trauma he experienced, he is offended by the city, and years later, "Rauf's mother" agrees to come with him because he is longing for Istanbul, but there is only one condition: he will not go down to the port. However, Rauf came to Istanbul especially for Ali. He is aware that his own disease is progressing. He is determined to reveal the secrets of Ali's past before he dies, and to entrust Ali to safe hands. For this reason, he finds the former boxing champion Şahin Vargı. When they set foot in the port, things do not develop as Rauf thinks. As soon as Ali gets off the ship, he becomes the hero of the story of a girl he does not know.

== Cast ==
=== Main characters ===
Actor	Character	Episode
Kerem Bürsin	Ali Smith	1–20
Leyla Lydia Tuğutlu	Derin Mirkelamoğlu	1–20
Gürkan Uygun	Şahin Vargı	1–20
Osman Alkaş	Rauf (Mother)	1–20
Defne Kayalar	Nesrin	1–20

=== Other characters ===
Actor	Character	Episode
Seda Akman	Belgin Mirkelamoğlu	1–20
Burak Tamdoğan	Tekin Görgünoğlu / Mirkelamoğlu	1–20
Nilperi Şahinkaya	Aslı	7–16
Ali Yörenç	Yiğit Bursalı	1–20

== Series overview ==
Season	Screening day and time	Season start	Season final	Number of episodes	Episode Range	Season year	TV channel
Season 1	Wednesday 20:00	4 January 2017	14 June 2017	20	1–20	2017	ATV

== Awards and nominations ==
Year	Awards	Category	Nominee	Result	Ref.
2017	Seoul International Drama Awards	Best drama series	Bu Şehir Arkandan Gelecek	Nominated	
2017	Seoul International Drama Awards	Best Actor	Kerem Bürsin	Won	
