= Immortals (TV series) =

2018 Turkish-language television series

- Genre: Drama fantasy
- Starring: Elçin Sangu; Kerem Bürsin; Birkan Sokullu
- Country of origin: Turkey
- Original language: Turkish
- No. of seasons: 1
- No. of episodes: 8

Production
- Running time: 60 minutes
- Production companies: Braveborn; Bubi Film; Istanbul 74

Original release
- Network: BluTV
- Release: July 17 – October 18, 2018

Immortals (Turkish: Yaşamayanlar) is a 2018 Turkish web series starring Elçin Sangu, Kerem Bürsin and Birkan Sokullu.

== Plot ==
The plot is set in Istanbul and revolves around the vampire Mia (Elçin Sangu) who wants to kill the vampire who turned her, Dmitry (Kerem Bürsin), so that she will return to being a human again. To be able to do that, Mia first has to gain Dmitry's confidence.

== Episodes ==
=== Season 1 (2018) ===
Episode	Director	Writer	Release date	Platform
Episode 1	Alphan Eşeli	Şamil Yılmaz	September 6, 2018	BluTV
Episode 2	Alphan Eşeli	Şamil Yılmaz	September 6, 2018	BluTV
Episode 3	Alphan Eşeli	Şamil Yılmaz	September 13, 2018	BluTV
Episode 4	Alphan Eşeli	Şamil Yılmaz	September 20, 2018	BluTV
5. Episode	Alphan Eşeli	Şamil Yılmaz	September 27, 2018	BluTV
Episode 6	Alphan Eşeli	Şamil Yılmaz	October 4, 2018	BluTV
Episode 7	Alphan Eşeli	Şamil Yılmaz	October 11, 2018	BluTV
Episode 8 (Final)	Alphan Eşeli	Şamil Yılmaz	October 18, 2018	BluTV

== Release schedule ==
Season	First broadcast	Last broadcast	Episode range	Number of episodes shot	Release year	Platform
Season 1	September 6, 2018	October 18, 2018	1-8	8	2018	BluTV

== Cast ==
- Elçin Sangu as Mia
- Kerem Bürsin as Dmitry
- Birkan Sokullu as Numel
- Selma Ergeç as Karmen
- Nilperi Şahinkaya as Melisa
- Efecan Şenolsun as Sercan
- Türkü Turan as Zehra
- Elit İşcan as Ayşe
- Oral Özer as Yavuz
- Hazal Türesan as Yisa
- İpek Tenolcay as Mari
- Edip Tepeli as Sisman
- Erdeniz Kurucan as Turgut
- Birce Kırkova as Beril Acar

== Release ==
Immortals was released between July 17, 2018 and October 18, 2018 on BluTV

It is known as "Mia The Vampire" (ミア・ザ・ヴァンパイア) in Japan.
