= Kadın (TV series) =

2017 Turkish television series

- Also known as: Woman
- Genre: Drama
- Based on: Woman by Yuji Sakamoto
- Written by: Hande Altaylı
- Directed by: Merve Girgin; Nadim Güç
- Starring: Özge Özpirinçci; Caner Cindoruk; Bennu Yıldırımlar; Şerif Erol; Feyyaz Duman; Seray Kaya; Kubra Süzgün; Ali Semi Sefil
- Theme music composer: Cem Tuncer; Ercüment Orkut
- Country of origin: Turkey
- Original language: Turkish
- No. of seasons: 3
- No. of episodes: 81

Production
- Producers: Faruk Bayhan; Fatih Aksoy
- Running time: 120 minutes
- Production companies: Med Yapım; MF Yapım

Original release
- Network: Fox
- Release: October 24, 2017 – February 4, 2020

Kadın (English title: Woman) is a Turkish drama television series based on the 2013 Japanese drama Woman, starring Özge Özpirinçci, Caner Cindoruk and Bennu Yıldırımlar. It premiered on Fox on October 24, 2017. The series ended on February 4, 2020, after 81 episodes and three seasons.

== Plot ==
This series follows the life of Bahar, a young widow of two children, Nisan and Doruk. Her husband, Sarp, died in a ferry accident a few years prior.

Bahar is forced to move to an impoverished neighborhood due to financial struggles and meets Arif and Ceyda. Arif is the son of Yusuf, the owner of Bahar's apartment building. Ceyda, while initially hostile towards Bahar, later befriends her. Bahar's estranged mother, Hatice comes back into her life after 20 years. While Bahar wishes to rekindle her relationship with her mother, her jealous half-sister Şirin prevents her mother and her from bonding. In order to protect Şirin's mental well-being, Hatice turns her back on Bahar once more. Bahar is secretly supported by her stepfather, Enver, and her best friend, Yeliz.

Bahar's health deteriorates over time and she soon finds out that she has aplastic anemia and needs a bone marrow transplant to save her life. She attempts to hide her condition due to her financial and social problems, but everyone soon discovers her illness. To Bahar's dismay, her half-sister Şirin's bone marrow is the only compatible donor; however, Sirin refuses to cooperate.

Meanwhile, Sarp is shown to be alive, having adopted a new life under the name Alp Karahan; he is married to Pırıl, a wealthy socialite, and has twin children. He is misled by Pırıl's father, Suat, into believing that Bahar and their children died 4 years ago, a deception that was made up by Şirin. Suat, believing Şirin, creates fake graves to further enforce the lie. Soon, Sarp encounters Şirin and it is revealed that Şirin has created a very intricate web of lies because she is obsessed with Sarp, and was the cause of Sarp's ferry accident by falsely accusing him of sexual harassment. Suat kidnaps Şirin to prevent Sarp from learning that Bahar is alive.

Bahar's condition worsens and she is hospitalized. Arif, having developed feelings for Bahar, proposes to her. However, Sarp finds Enver and learns that Bahar and his kids are actually alive and living in dire conditions. At the hospital, he reunites with Nisan and Doruk. He locates Şirin and begs her return and go through with the transplant. Bahar recovers and reunites with Sarp. However, Bahar rejects him after learning of his new life with Pırıl. Meanwhile, Nezir, whose son was accidentally killed by Sarp, concocts a plan to kidnap Bahar to lure Sarp out and murder him. However, Sarp escapes with Bahar and the children, and are able to avoid Nezir's henchmen; Bahar is forced to hide in Pırıl's home with her kids. Yeliz is shot to death by Nezir's henchmen, and Bahar breaks down after learning of Yeliz's death. Sarp reveals to Bahar the truth of the ferry accident, and how Şirin and Suat deception regarding her death led to him moving on with Pırıl.

Bahar, Hatice, Sarp and Arif meet with a tragic car accident, and Hatice dies. Șirin secretly closes the flow rate of the IV line connected to a sleeping Sarp and kills him. Şirin falsely blames Arif for their deaths. Shocked, Bahar completes the last rites of Sarp and Hatice while Arif is arrested.

Three months later, Bahar is living peacefully with her children, Arif is released from jail, and Enver and Şirin move into Sarp's abandoned apartment. Şirin brainwashes Nisan and Doruk into believing that Arif intentionally killed Sarp and Hatice, but in vain. Meanwhile, Şirin gets a job at a café belonging to Emre, who is Ceyda's childhood friend and the secret father of Arda (Ceyda's autistic son). It is revealed that Arda is not Ceyda and Emre's biological son. They meet their son, Satilmiș, but Ceyda refuses to accept him. Satilmiș secretly earns money to keep Arda with them. Finding out this, Ceyda breaks down and accepts him.

Ceyda becomes the caretaker of paraplegic Raif, son of the famous writer Fazilet. Fazilet is fascinated by Bahar life story and decides to writes a book dedicated to her life, naming the book Kadın (Woman).

Soon, Arif discovers that Sarp was killed by Șirin after hearing her confession. Șirin is arrested by the police, who admit her to a mental hospital. Meanwhile, Arif and Bahar's relationship strengthens as Raif and Ceyda simultaneously fall in love. Bahar-Arif and Ceyda-Raif get married in a shared ceremony.

At the conference of introducing the author of the book Kadın (Woman), Bahar shares how she managed to survive while facing so much hardship. Șirin reads Bahar's book and initially rejects what she did to Bahar, but breaks down because of the situation she is in. Finally, Bahar and her kids get praised by the world.

== Cast ==
=== Main ===
- Özge Özpirinçci as Bahar Sarıkadı / Çeşmeli – Hatice's daughter; Enver's step-daughter; Şirin's half-sister; Sarp's first widow; Arif's wife; Nisan and Doruk's mother
  - Su Burcu Yazgı Coşkun as Child Bahar
- Caner Cindoruk as Sarp Çeşmeli / Alp Karahan – Julide's son; Bahar and Pırıl's husband; Nisan, Doruk, Ali and Ümer's father
- Bennu Yıldırımlar as Hatice Sarıkadı – Enver's wife; Bahar and Șirin's mother; Nisan and Doruk's grandmother
- Seray Kaya as Şirin Sarıkadı – Hatice and Enver's daughter; Bahar's half-sister; Sarp's obsessive lover
- Şerif Erol as Enver Sarıkadı – Hatice's widower; Şirin's father; Bahar's step-father; Nisan and Doruk's step-grandfather
- Feyyaz Duman as Arif Kara – Yusuf's son; Kismet's half-brother; Bahar's husband; Nisan and Doruk's adoptive father
- Kübra Süzgün as Nisan Çeşmeli – Bahar and Sarp's daughter; Arif's adopted daughter; Doruk's sister; Ali and Ümer's half-sister
  - Dila Nil Yıldırım as Baby Nisan
- Ali Semi Sefil as Doruk Çeşmeli – Bahar and Sarp's son; Arif's adopted son; Nisan's brother; Ali and Ümer's half-brother

=== Supporting ===
- Gökçe Eyüboğlu as Ceyda Aşçıoğlu: Bahar's neighbor and friend; Raif's wife; Emre's ex-fiancée; Satilmiş's mother; Arda's adoptive mother
- Ayça Erturan as Yeliz Ünsal: Bahar's best friend; Asli and Tunç's mother
- Sinan Helvacı as Raif Aşçıoğlu: Fazilet's son; Ceyda's husband; Satilmiș and Arda's adoptive father
- Hümeyra as Fazilet Aşçıoğlu: A writer; Raif's mother
- Ece Özdikici / Pınar Çağlar Gençtürk as Dr. Jale Demir: Bahar's doctor; Musa's wife; Bora's mother
- Ahu Yağtu as Pırıl Çeşmeli: Suat's daughter; Mert's ex-fiancée; Sarp's second widow; Ali and Ümer's mother
- Devrim Özder Akın as Musa Demir: Jale's husband; Bora's father
- Demir Beyitolgu as Bora Demir: Musa and Jale's son; Doruk's best friend
- Elif Naz Emre as Elif: Nisan's classmate
- Ayça Melek Gülerçe as Așli: Yeliz's daughter; Tunç's sister; Nisan and Doruk's friend
- Kaan Şener as Tunç: Yeliz's son; Așli's brother; Nisan and Doruk's friend
- Mehetan Parıltı as Satilmiş Aşçıoğlu: Emre and Ceyda's son; Raif's adopted son; Arda's adopted brother; Nisan and Doruk's friend
- Kerem Yozgatli as Arda Karataş: Ceyda and Raif's adopted son; Satilmiş's adopted brother; Nisan and Doruk's friend (2018–2020)
- Eren İkizler as Ali Çeșmeli: Sarp and Pırıl's son; Nisan and Doruk's half-brother
- Emre İkizler as Ümer Çeșmeli: Sarp and Pırıl's son; Nisan and Doruk's half-brother
- Hakan Kurtaş as Cem Bey: Kismet's ex-husband; Bahar and Ceyda's former boss (2019-2020)
- Tuğçe Altuğ as Kismet Avcı: A lawyer; Yusuf's daughter; Arif's half-sister; Cem's ex-wife
- Oktay Gürsoy as Dr. Sinan: Jale's friend; Bahar's doctor
- Yaşar Uzel as Yusuf Kara: Arif and Kismet's father; Bahar's landlord
- Ahmet Rıfat Şungar as Emre: Idil's cousin; Ceyda's ex-fiancé; Satilmiş's father
- Sinem Uçar as Ferdane: Bahar's friend and well wisher in her old workplace
- Busra İl as Idil: Emre's cousin; Şirin's enemy
- Sahra Şaş as Berşan: Arif's ex-fiancée
- Resit Berker Enhos as Ziya: Şirin's art teacher
- Semi Sırtıkkızıl as Levent: Şirin's fiancé
- Gazanfer Ündüz as Suat: Pırıl's father; Ali and Ümer's grandfather
- Şebnem Köstem as Jülide Çesmeli: Sarp's mother; Nisan, Doruk, Ali and Ümer's grandmother
- Hakan Karahan as Nezir Korkmaz: Mert's father; A head of underworld
- Eray Cezayirlioglu as Mert Korkmaz: Nezir's son; Pırıl's ex-fiancé
- Rana Cabbar as Seyfullah: Umran's father
- Caner Çandarlı as Münir: Sarp's bodyguard and eventually best friend; Suat's direct employee
- Kuzey Yucehan as Azmi: Münir's older brother and Nezir's right-hand man
- Melih Çardak as Hikmet: Ceyda's boss; Umran's husband
- Canan Karanlık as Ümran: Hikmet's wife
- Selim Aygün as Peyami: Hikmet's secretary
- Sevinç Meşe as Füsun: Sinan's girlfriend

== Series overview ==
Season	Episodes	Originally released	
Season	Episodes	First released	Last released
1	32	October 24, 2017	June 5, 2018
2	32	October 2, 2018	May 28, 2019
3	17	October 1, 2019	February 4, 2020

== Awards and nominations ==
Year	Award	Category	Nominated work	Result
2018	Tokyo Drama Awards	Special Award (Foreign dramas)	Kadın	Won
2018	Golden Butterfly Awards	Best Actress	Özge Özpirinçci	Won
2018	Golden Butterfly Awards	Best Child Actor	Kübra Süzgün and Ali Semi Sefil	Won
2018	Golden Butterfly Awards	Best TV series	Kadın	Nominated
2018	Golden Butterfly Awards	Best Composer	Cem Tuncer	Nominated
2018	Golden Butterfly Awards	Best Screenwriter	Hande Altaylı	Nominated
2018	Golden Butterfly Awards	Best Director	Nadim Güç	Nominated
