= Aras Aydın =

Turkish actor

- Born: 4 January 1989 (age 37); Ankara, Turkey
- Occupation: Actor
- Years active: 2010–present
- Spouse: Melis Birkan (m. 2022)

Aras Aydın (born 4 January 1989) is a Turkish actor. Born in 1989 in Ankara, he studied theatre at the Istanbul University State Conservatory. He made his debut in 2010 with the series Öğretmen Kemal. In 2013, he briefly appeared in the series Şefkat Tepe and in 2014 he was cast in a supporting role in Saklı Kalan. He was first noted by the general audience with his portrayal of Emre Yiğit in Kiraz Mevsimi. He then made his cinematic debut in 2016 with a leading role in the movie Oğlan Bizim Kız Bizim. Aydın later had main roles in series such as Altınsoylar and Canevim.

== Filmography ==
Film
Year	Title	Role	Notes
2016	Oğlan Bizim Kız Bizim	Barış	Leading role
2020	İnsanlar İkiye Ayrılır	Bahadır	Leading role
Television
Year	Title	Role	Notes
2010	Öğretmen Kemal	Mert	Supporting role
2012	Şefkat Tepe	Teğmen Volkan	Guest appearance
2014	Saklı Kalan	Ateş	Supporting role
2014–2015	Kiraz Mevsimi	Emre Yiğit	Leading role
2015–2016	İnadına Aşk	Polat Barutçu	Supporting role
2016	N'olur Ayrılalım	Ulaş Vardar	Leading role
2016	Altınsoylar	Oğuz Yılmaz	Leading role
2018	Masum Değiliz	Emir Uyar	Leading role
2019	Canevim	Maraz Ömer Kılıç	Leading role
2020	Sefirin Kızı	Turgut	Guest appearance
2020	Şeref Sözü	Faruk Malik	Supporting role
2021	İkimizin Sırrı	Alp Karahun	Leading role
2022	Kaçış	Fadıl	Leading role
2022–2024	Aldatmak	Behram Dicleli	Supporting role
2024–2025	Siyah Kalp	Nuh Çakırca	Leading role
2025	Nine Perfect Strangers	Matteo	Leading role, season 2
