= Nine Perfect Strangers (TV series) =

2021 American drama television series

- Season 1 title card
- Genre: Drama; Mystery; Thriller
- Created by: David E. Kelley
- Based on: Nine Perfect Strangers by Liane Moriarty
- Developed by: David E. Kelley & John‑Henry Butterworth
- Showrunners: David E. Kelley; John-Henry Butterworth
- Directed by: Jonathan Levine; Anthony Byrne
- Starring: Nicole Kidman; Melissa McCarthy; Michael Shannon; Luke Evans; Asher Keddie; Samara Weaving; Melvin Gregg; Tiffany Boone; Manny Jacinto; Grace Van Patten; Zoe Terakes; Regina Hall; Bobby Cannavale; Aras Aydın; Christine Baranski; Murray Bartlett; Dolly de Leon; Lucas Englander; Henry Golding; Annie Murphy; Lena Olin; King Princess; Maisie Richardson-Sellers; Mark Strong
- Music by: Marco Beltrami and Miles Hankins
- Country of origin: United States
- Original language: English
- No. of seasons: 2
- No. of episodes: 16

Production
- Executive producers: Samantha Strauss; John-Henry Butterworth; Molly Allen; Melissa McCarthy; Liane Moriarty; Jonathan Levine; Jodi Matterson; Steve Hutensky; Bruna Papandrea; Nicole Kidman; Per Saari; David E. Kelley; Rachel Shukert; Matthew Tinker; Anthony Byrne
- Producers: Gillian Bohrer; Barbara Gibbs
- Production locations: Byron Bay, New South Wales; Swiss Alps; Munich; Austria
- Cinematography: Yves Bélanger; Frank Lamm
- Editors: Ben Lester; David Berman; Janet Weinberg; Tyler L. Cook; Joseph Ettinger
- Running time: 36–55 minutes
- Production companies: David E. Kelley Productions; Blossom Films; Made Up Stories; Fifth Season

Original release
- Network: Hulu
- Release: August 18, 2021 – July 22, 2025

Nine Perfect Strangers is an American drama television series based on the 2018 novel of the same name by Liane Moriarty. Created by David E. Kelley who also developed the series alongside John-Henry Butterworth, starring Nicole Kidman and an ensemble cast, the series premiered on August 18, 2021, on Hulu. A second season premiered on May 21, 2025.

== Premise ==
Nine strangers from the city gather for a ten-day retreat at Tranquillum House, a health and wellness resort in the fictional town of Cabrillo, California, which promises to transform and heal the guests who stay there. The resort is not what it seems to be, and the guests are about to discover many secrets about each other and the resort's host. One of the controversies arising between the guests and resort director Masha starts when she tells them during a meal conducted at a large table that they are all given a psychoactive drug, namely psilocybin, in minimal but relevant doses in their food without their consent or even knowledge, about which the guests are upset and assume it to be a crime.

== Cast and characters ==
=== Main ===
- Nicole Kidman as Masha Dmitrichenko, the Russian founder of the wellness resort, Tranquillum House

==== Season 1 ====
- Melissa McCarthy as Frances Welty, a novelist struggling with her professional and personal life
- Michael Shannon as Napoleon Marconi, Heather's husband and Zoe's father, a high school teacher grieving the death of his son
- Luke Evans as Lars Lee, a man who comes to the resort with a hidden agenda
- Samara Weaving as Jessica Chandler, a social media influencer and Ben's wife
- Asher Keddie as Heather Marconi, Napoleon's wife and Zoe's mother, mourning the death of her son
- Melvin Gregg as Ben Chandler, Jessica's wealthy lottery winner husband
- Tiffany Boone as Delilah, a devoted employee at Tranquillum House
- Manny Jacinto as Yao, Masha's right-hand man at Tranquillum House
- Grace Van Patten as Zoe Marconi, Napoleon and Heather's daughter, grieving the death of her twin brother
- Zoe Terakes as Glory, another employee at Tranquillum House
- Regina Hall as Carmel Schneider, a single mother of four children whose husband left her for a younger woman
- Bobby Cannavale as Tony Hogburn, a former American football tight end struggling with his drug addiction

==== Season 2 ====
- Aras Aydın as Matteo, Victoria's younger boyfriend and caregiver
- Christine Baranski as Victoria, an elderly woman with amyotrophic lateral sclerosis (ALS) and Imogen's mother
- Murray Bartlett as Brian, a former puppeteering star on a children's show called Crabapple Clubhouse
- Dolly de Leon as Agnes, a former nun
- Lucas Englander as Martin, a pharmacologist that runs the wellness retreat Zauberwald with Masha and Helena's son
- Henry Golding as Peter, David's son
- Annie Murphy as Imogen, Victoria's 35-year-old daughter
- Lena Olin as Helena, Martin's mother and Masha's mentor
- King Princess as Tina, Wolfie's girlfriend who is a former pianist
- Maisie Richardson-Sellers as Wolfie, Tina's girlfriend
- Mark Strong as David, Peter's father and Masha's former lover who is a billionaire

=== Special guest star ===
- Ben Falcone as Paul Drabble (season 1), a man who catfished Frances and left her heartbroken

=== Recurring ===
- Hal Cumpston as Zach Marconi (season 1), Napoleon and Heather's deceased son

== Episodes ==
=== Series overview ===
| Season | Episodes | Originally released | |
| Season | Episodes | First released | Last released |
|---|---|---|---|
| 1 | 8 | August 18, 2021 | September 22, 2021 |
| 2 | 8 | May 21, 2025 | July 2, 2025 |

=== Season 1 (2021) ===
| No. overall | No. in season | Title | Directed by | Written by | Original release date |
|---|---|---|---|---|---|
| 1 | 1 | "Random Acts of Mayhem" | Jonathan Levine | David E. Kelley & John-Henry Butterworth | August 18, 2021 |
Nine people arrive at Tranquillum House, an exclusive and award-winning health resort: high school teacher Napoleon Marconi, wife Heather, and their young adult daughter Zoe; Jessica and Ben Chandler, an attractive & wealthy young couple; Frances, an author who's in both personal and professional turmoil; Carmel, a verbose mother-of-two; Tony; and Lars. Some guests are at odds with each other from the get-go, namely Frances with Tony and Lars with Carmel. Their phones are confiscated at entry, with staff removing their contraband. Napoleon and Heather argue about their state of being after their teenage son's suicide, while Lars contacts his estranged lover using his smartwatch. Masha welcomes them to the resort, and both her unvarnished approach and her removal of guests' items result in a heated orientation. Masha recounts her workaholic past to the guests, how she was clinically dead after being shot, and how she was saved by Yao, a paramedic, now her right-hand man.
| 2 | 2 | "The Critical Path" | Jonathan Levine | David E. Kelley & John-Henry Butterworth | August 18, 2021 |
After the tense orientation, Masha converses with Tony about his addiction after returning his medication, while both Zoe and Jessica confide in Frances about their respective families' troubles. Masha starts receiving threatening text messages. On the first day of treatment, after a curated breakfast, the guests dig a grave plot and lie in it while Masha prompts them to contemplate their deaths. Frances recalls how she fell for an online swindler (Paul) who conned her out of a large sum of money. The agitation and provocations of the guests continue, prompting Delilah to voice her concerns to Masha. After Tony saves Frances from choking on a grape that he threw in the latter's mouth while she was asleep afloat in the pool, they talk about Frances's stagnating career and how she was scammed. While the group is engaging in a trust exercise, Heather walks to the very edge of a cliff, which frightens both the guests and the staff. Frances voices her intent to leave the resort, but Masha persuades her to stay another day. It is shown how the guests are under Masha's constant surveillance, and later Masha decides to initiate a new protocol, though Yao and Delilah are uncertain.
| 3 | 3 | "Earth Day" | Jonathan Levine | Teleplay by : Samantha Strauss | August 18, 2021 |
Masha is receiving threatening messages. Carmel attacks Lars at breakfast. They meditate and begin to reveal themselves. There's a sack race. Ben realises who Tony is. The women go swimming while the men go foraging. Jessica isn't happy with Carmel. Tony chases a goat. They return with the dead animal, which upsets Masha. At the banquet, Napoleon talks about his son's suicide and says he killed the goat.
| 4 | 4 | "Brave New World" | Jonathan Levine | David E. Kelley & John-Henry Butterworth | August 25, 2021 |
Masha confirms that the guest's smoothies are drugged, which she describes as micro-dosing. Several are shocked and want to leave. Lars admits to being a journalist. Carmel eventually reveals the abuse she suffered from her husband. Frances and Carmel take out their anger on a samurai mannequin. Tony tells Frances he killed a man in a bar. Napoleon wants to leave, but Heather persuades him to stay. There's a party on the eve of Zoe's 21st.
| 5 | 5 | "Sweet Surrender" | Jonathan Levine | David E. Kelley | September 1, 2021 |
Zoe "sees" her dead brother. He asks her to say they got on. Lars said he had a dream that he had a baby. The father was Tony, which annoys him. Frances "sees" Paul, the man who scammed her. He says her books are rubbish. She faints. Delilah is angry with Masha and asks her to stop sleeping with Yao. Tony is clean but is worried about his future. Jessica and Ben have sex in the hot tub. Carmel sees them. Lars reassures her and says she should move on. The group holds a 21st birthday party for Zoe (and Zach).
| 6 | 6 | "Motherlode" | Jonathan Levine | Teleplay by : Jessica Sharzer & Jonathan Levine | September 8, 2021 |
Lars dreams about being bullied at school. Frances sees a "miniature Paul" and flushes him down the toilet. Carmel wants a one-on-one, as she knows Masha had an affair with her husband, but Masha regrets it. Everyone is paired with "buddies". Zoe sees Zach. Napoleon then sees Heather, too, but she has an "episode". Masha tells them she can use psychotics so they can interact safely with Zach. Frances tells Carmel she isn't improving like everyone else. Masha has a flashback to her daughter's death from being hit by a car while riding her bike.
| 7 | 7 | "Wheels on the Bus" | Jonathan Levine | David E. Kelley | September 15, 2021 |
Carmel attacks Masha and has to be sedated. Tony tells Frances of his plans to build a life with her, which frightens her. Masha wants to help the Marconis see their dead son, but Zoe is hesitant. Masha says she'll take a trip with the Marconis, but is called away to see Frances. Delilah is unhappy and decides to leave. Lars knows one of the guests died last year. Masha goes to see Carmel and realises she was the person who shot her.
| 8 | 8 | "Ever After" | Jonathan Levine | David E. Kelley | September 22, 2021 |
Masha doesn't blame Carmel; she thanks her. Frances tries to explain to Tony why she reacted as she did. Carmel is in a deprivation tank and freaks out. Frances and Tony plan on leaving. Napoleon has a nosebleed. They can all see Zach. Carmel gets out, but she's locked in the room. The others try to free her. Masha locks them all in the room. Masha tells Glory to start the fire. They talk about their futures. The fire was a simulation. Napoleon runs into the woods and sees Zach. He says they need to let go. Delilah alerts the police. It is snowing. Masha follows Zoe and sees her daughter. The police arrive. The guests say nothing happened. Frances and Tony go to a restaurant. She starts writing a book. Lars is with his partner and their baby. Carmel is running classes. The Marconis are happy. Ben and Jessica have taken over Tranquillum. Masha drives off in a yellow Lamborghini, her daughter by her side.

=== Season 2 (2025) ===
| No. overall | No. in season | Title | Directed by | Written by | Original release date |
|---|---|---|---|---|---|
| 9 | 1 | "Zauberwald" | Jonathan Levine | Rachel Shukert | May 21, 2025 |
Following the success of Lars Lee's article in The New Yorker, and Frances Welty's New York Times bestselling novel, Nine Perfect Strangers, Masha Dmitrichenko is the subject of multiple federal investigations. Masha announces a new proprietary psychedelic delivery system allowing patients to experience specific formative memories, as if for the first time. Masha travels to Zauberwald, a remote wellness retreat, to reconnect with Martin, a pharmacologist, and Helena, to whom Masha owes her career and life. Martin insists Masha must adhere to boundaries. The retreat guests include billionaire David, his son Peter, former nun Agnes, Brian, who's obsessed with a missing piece of luggage, Imogen, who's attending to work through relationship issues with her mother Victoria, a frequent guest, who brings her much younger lover Matteo, and musician couple Tina and Wolfie. Brian mistakes Agnes for a staff member. Victoria recognizes Agnes from Rome. Masha insists they cannot start until David arrives, which frustrates the other guests. Tina is upset Wolfie brought her to help with her piano blocks. Helena is angry with Masha for inviting David. Masha continues to see visions of her late child Tatiana.
| 10 | 2 | "The Crabapple Clubhouse" | Jonathan Levine | Jaclyn Moore | May 21, 2025 |
In a flashback, Masha meets Helena for the first time, while struggling with the loss of Tatiana, and is introduced to a protocol to be able to see her daughter again. In the present, Imogen awakens in Peter's bed. Tina insists she doesn't want to be there. Masha delivers Brian's missing luggage, containing "Jessie Bear", a puppet from a children's show (Crabapple Clubhouse). Brian imagines the puppet alive telling him to have courage, echoing a note Masha left in his room. Brian apologizes to Agnes for the previous mix-up. Victoria recognizes Tina from a piano performance. Masha instructs Martin to tell the guests they will be foraging, and Brian will be the group's leader. Martin objects that it's not the plan, but Masha insists she won't start the protocol until David arrives. Imogen objects, because she recognizes Brian for being cancelled during a meltdown on camera. Victoria stays behind to drink with an end-of-life planner, showing numerous unpaid bills. Despite the snow, the other guests split up to cover more ground. Wolfie confides in Brian that Tina threw away both of their careers. Tina confides in Agnes that the music just stopped one day, while Agnes shares she came looking for absolution. Matteo notes his parents died due to war, while Imogen connects the dots with Peter and his father. David finally arrives and is isolated to his room. While preparing dinner, Imogen and Brian come to blows with Imogen blaming Brian for ruining her childhood, and Brian insisting people need to show compassion. Tina reveals she was on Brian's show. Masha visits David's room, and it's clear they have a previous connection as they start kissing.
| 11 | 3 | "The Field Trip" | Jonathan Levine | Dan Robert & Lisha Brooks | May 28, 2025 |
Martin expresses his desire to not work with Masha, while Helena secretly coughs up blood. Agnes acknowledges she's there out of guilt and Masha offers that she seems uncomfortable with self-forgiveness. David misses breakfast, but Masha tells Martin to continue as planned. Martin takes the guests to a museum to begin the protocol. While experiencing interference during a call, David questions whether Masha installed a signal jammer. She won't allow him to join the others late but insists he can join her. At the museum, everyone but Victoria consumes the first protocol dose. Victoria leaves to drink and is unable to lift one hand. Feeling the effects, Imogen and Peter imagine they are characters from the children's book Heidi, Brian imagines he's back on The Crabapple Clubhouse, and Tina groans in pain. Agnes follows bells to a church where she confesses she no longer hears the divine voice and begs for absolution, as a flashback shows Agnes nursing a hemorrhaging pregnant woman who died, along with her baby. After violently banging her head into the confessional, Martin finds Agnes at the police station, resenting Masha. At Zauberwald, David and Masha trek barefoot through the snow and take a cold-water plunge. Masha asks about David's relationship with Peter, but David goes into shock. While recuperating, David notices Masha wearing a necklace gifted by him in the past. After the guests return, Imogen and Peter enter his bedroom and have an awkward encounter seeing David in the bed. Moved by her earlier experience, Agnes sleeps in the bed for the first time.
| 12 | 4 | "The Major Lift" | Anthony Byrne | Sarah Sutherland | June 4, 2025 |
In flashbacks, Tina and Wolfie meet, Wolfie loses her violin scholarship, and they fall in love. In the present, Tina has a nightmare where she horribly plays a piano that attacks her. Upon waking, she freaks seeing instruments being transported inside. Aware of financial difficulties, David alerts Masha that he suspects he was invited for his money. Martin confronts Masha as he felt set-up at the museum. David arrives at breakfast for the first time, meeting the other guests, and recognizes Agnes from a prior photo op. Brian recognizes David as his network was the first to play his public meltdown. Masha reminds Helena she is no longer her patient despite Helena's insistence that bringing David is a regression. Peter tells Imogen that they should spend their energy working through their parental issues. The guests, feeling the increased protocol dosages, meet in the ballroom. Wolfie plays the violin and encourages Tina to play piano, but Tina storms off, while the remaining guests participate in a dance party. Tina tells Masha that Wolfie is more like her mother than girlfriend. Tina tells Wolfie she doesn't want to play music, but still wants to be loved, while Wolfie doesn't know her purpose if Tina has given up on music. Victoria offers a mother-daughter slumber party with Imogen, but when Imogen arrives, Victoria is passed out drunk, so Imogen bonds with Tina. Peter attempts to bond with David, but is dismissed. Masha sees Tatiana again and tells her tonight she's going to meet her father (David).
| 13 | 5 | "Prague" | Jonathan Levine | Teleplay by : Sarah Sutherland; Story by : Noah Diaz | June 11, 2025 |
Placing a device on his chest, Masha takes David on an advanced psychedelic journey. She explains memories are rebuilt every time they're recalled and with the right triggers people can relive them with a new understanding. While she's only tested on herself, she's excited to include David. In a flashback to Prague 2001 (and a simultaneous relived memory), David is interviewed for a news show where Masha is an assistant. Masha introduces herself as Mila Zarutskova and they return to David's hotel where David notices Masha admiring a necklace. Masha then takes David to a memory of a hospital where Masha holds her newborn, Tatiana, and tells a nurse the father is unknown. David realizes he's the father and wants to meet her. Years later, Masha sees David again in Prague with a Russian man. She gets a job at a local paper and discovers the man is a military contractor and works hard to expose him. Masha becomes a target, so she quits her job, changes her name, and moves repeatedly. Because it's about punishment, not silence, Masha reaches out to David for help, first pleading, then threatening. David swears he never received any messages, because his business associates kept things from him. Tatiana's murder is the final punishment. In the present, David wants more people to experience what he felt. He wants to make things right even though he never knew Tatiana was his daughter. Masha forgives David and they make love. Martin has been recording and listening to the entire encounter.
| 14 | 6 | "The Other Side" | Anthony Byrne | Teleplay by : Jonathan Levine; Story by : Sam Potochick | June 18, 2025 |
Masha, conflicted seeing David as her daughter's murderer and family, wants atonement, whereas Helena suggests forgiveness. Victoria is unable to move her limbs. David tells Peter he's the father of Masha's deceased child. Peter worries Masha wants David's money. During Peter's treatment, he recalls a childhood abandonment memory where David explained he and Peter's mother were separating. Desperate to find David, Masha sends Peter on a quest. David sees a business opportunity with his technology and Masha's protocol treatment. At breakfast, Masha explains she uses prompts to take the guests back to a core trauma, uses medication to feel it's being experienced for the first time, burns the memories away, and builds a new response/closure/truth to the memory. Agnes, Brian, Wolfie and Tina bond together in a wine bath, all feeling happier and lighter. Brian notes the memories he's obsessed over now seem fine, like he's pre-forgiven himself with hindsight. Matteo, under treatment, remembers a hospital and Agnes giving him "Jessie Bear" for support after explaining his parents died. Matteo sees butterflies, representing souls of the dead moving through purgatory to paradise. Matteo fights the memory to keep the pain, as there is no fear of loss because he's already lost. This sentiment deeply hits Masha. Victoria initially declines treatment, but changes course when Imogen wants to remember her happy childhood family. In the memory, Victoria tells young Imogen her father is a hero because he built a satellite that can find anything in the world. Then young Imogen sees her father, drinking, watching a news report of a drone strike resulting in countless casualties. Young Matteo appears in the news report as his parents were killed in the drone strike. Imogen's final memory is finding her father after he committed suicide. Awakened from her memories, Imogen sees Victoria seizing. Masha is angry at Martin as the medication wasn't calibrated for Victoria. Thoroughly shocking Imogen, Matteo discloses Victoria has ALS and he is also Victoria's caregiver. Helena orders Masha to end the retreat, but Masha refuses. Helena insists Masha needs more work on herself before helping others, which infuriates Masha. It's revealed that Helena died years earlier and Masha's interactions were all hallucinations.
| 15 | 7 | "Mergers and Acquisitions" | Anthony Byrne | Jaclyn Moore | June 25, 2025 |
In a flashback, a scene from The Field Trip is revisited, where Helena coughs up blood. Masha arrives to see Helena in her frail state and Helena wants Masha to have Zauberwald and lead with vision to bring the place back to life. In the present, Agnes checks on Martin after Victoria's seizure as he believes he's having a crisis of faith. Martin updates the other guests on Victoria's situation and warns them that Masha is putting everyone in danger. Martin then calls out David for being Masha's future business partner and announces the whole retreat was to seduce an investor. Martin believes Masha duped Helena on her deathbed, which kept him from being in charge. Martin explains Masha came to Zauberwald after her daughter's death for treatment, and Helena believed she healed her. Peter confronts Masha and warns her that once David gets what he wants, he'll be gone. Imogen struggles having just learned about Victoria's condition. Matteo attempts to comfort her. Victoria tells Imogen she has a few years left if she's careful. Peter tells Imogen he spent his life craving love and attention from David and thought the retreat would help, but it didn't. Unable to sleep, Brian imagines "Jessie Bear" berating him for always having anger inside. David visits Masha announcing he could buy out Martin to give Masha complete ownership. Masha wants to introduce David to Tatiana through a treatment session together. He agrees, but unknowingly to David, Masha removes her device. The other guests awaken to fireworks and a message from Masha to meet downstairs for an emergency meeting. With all the guests assembled together, David is confused about what's happening as Masha notes it won't be easy and it might be painful, but he will grow from it.
| 16 | 8 | "Never Change" | Anthony Byrne | Rachel Shukert & Jaclyn Moore | July 2, 2025 |
Masha explains the guests' connection to David's company. David's news programs covered Brian's meltdown. David's company terminated Wolfie's young musician scholarship, funded the war-zone hospital where Agnes worked, and used satellite technology in drone attacks which killed Matteo's family. Victoria's husband – Imogen's father – unknowingly sold his satellite tracking technology to David's company resulting in his suicide upon learning of the attacks. Tina is Wolfie's "plus one". Martin ingests more hallucinogens to see Helena, who berates him. As the group revolts against David, he says starting immediately his company is ending weapons production and putting that money into charities and scholarships. Masha follows David outside, and Martin erratically follows with a gun hearing Helena saying take back what's theirs. Confused by the hallucinations, Martin points his gun at David, but Masha intervenes, and Martin shoots her. Masha decides to let Tatiana go. The next morning, Masha and Martin reconcile with Masha telling him that Zauberwald is his. David needs time to reconsider the treatments' risks and recants his decision to stop working with military contractors. Brian moves forward without "Jessie Bear". Agnes asks Brian to consider entertaining kids again in hospitals and schools. Wolfie ends her relationship with Tina. Heartbroken, but moved, Tina begins playing the piano again. Masha tells Tina that her The Crabapple Clubhouse episode was Tatiana's favorite. Imogen plans to visit Victoria and Peter soon. After leaving Zauberwald, the guests learn Masha leaked a video of David's promise to stop weapons production. One month later, David tells Masha he wants to start a business segment focusing on psychedelic therapy with her involvement for little compensation. Masha is insulted, but David blackmails her with footage from her surveillance cameras, obtained by paying Martin, showing the events during the retreat. Commenting that they're family, Masha signs the contract and seals the deal with a kiss.

== Production ==
=== Development ===
On May 1, 2019, it was reported that Hulu had given the production a straight-to-series order. The series was created by David E. Kelley, who developed the series with John-Henry Butterworth, both of whom also served as executive producers along with Nicole Kidman, Per Saari, Bruna Papandrea, Steve Hutensky, and Casey Haver. Kelley and Butterworth also served as co-showrunners. Production companies involved with the series are Made Up Stories, Blossom Films, and Endeavor Content. On January 7, 2020, Melissa McCarthy joined the series as an executive producer. On July 29, 2020, it was announced Jonathan Levine was set to direct all eight episodes of the series as well as serve as an executive producer, while Gillian Bohrer joined the series as producer. Yves Bélanger served as cinematographer.

Despite being conceived as a limited series, it was announced in June 2023 that the series was renewed for a second season.

The second season received €10m from the German Motion Picture Fund (GMPF), which accounted for almost 25% of the €44.8m distributed by the Berlin-based fund in 2023. Furthermore, the production secured the maximum allocation of €7.5 million from Austria's FISA+ program, designed to attract international productions to the country. The second season is being developed as a collaborative effort between the United States, Germany, and Austria, with production led by the US' Fifth Season alongside Germany's Supernix and Austria's Supernix Austria. In the second season, Masha will lead a fresh ensemble of nine strangers, who seek sanctuary from their hectic lives with a 10-day stay at a resort nestled in the Swiss Alps.

=== Casting ===
The initial series announcement reported that Nicole Kidman was cast in a lead role. In addition to her executive producing announcement, Melissa McCarthy had also joined the cast in a starring role. On May 27, 2020, Manny Jacinto joined the main cast. In June 2020, Asher Keddie and Luke Evans were cast in starring roles. In July 2020, Melvin Gregg, Samara Weaving, Grace Van Patten, Tiffany Boone and Michael Shannon joined the main cast. In August 2020, Regina Hall and Bobby Cannavale were cast in starring roles. On October 22, 2020, Hal Cumpston joined the cast in a recurring role. On November 19, 2020, Zoe Terakes was cast in a recurring role.

Upon the second season renewal announcement, it was reported that Kidman is set to reprise her role with a new ensemble cast. On December 14, 2023, Liv Ullmann, Murray Bartlett, Annie Murphy, Christine Baranski, Dolly de Leon, Maisie Richardson-Sellers, King Princess, Aras Aydın, and Lucas Englander were cast as series regulars for the second season. On March 21, 2024, Henry Golding, Mark Strong and Lena Olin were reported to join the cast.

=== Filming ===
On July 8, 2020, Evans revealed that filming would take place in Australia. All actors were required to quarantine for fourteen days in the city of arrival in Australia, due to regulations imposed by the Australian government in response to the COVID-19 pandemic. Furthermore, all actors were required to be tested during the quarantine before filming could begin. Principal photography began on August 10, 2020, in Byron Bay, New South Wales. On December 21, 2020, Kidman announced that filming had wrapped.

Kidman met most of the other nine actors right when filming their first scene together, and stayed in character as Masha during production.

Production on the second season took place over six months, from January to June 2024, following the conclusion of the 2023 WGA strike and 2023 SAG-AFTRA strike. Kidman's availability was delayed until after January, as she was committed to a different work during that time. The second season was filmed in various locations, including the Swiss Alps, Munich, and Austria. On July 20, 2024, Golding confirmed that the second season filming had wrapped. He also said that Kidman occasionally kept the accent even when she was not filming.

== Release ==
Hulu released a first-look trailer for the show during the 93rd Academy Awards airing on ABC on April 25, 2021. The series premiered on Hulu on August 18, 2021, with the first three episodes released at once, and a new episode released weekly thereafter. The finale was released on September 22, 2021. Outside of the United States and China, the series was released on Prime Video. It was broadcast free-to-air in Australia on SBS TV in October/November 2022 and in Greece on ERT in February 2024.

The second season was released on May 21, 2025, with two new episodes, followed by a new episode on a weekly basis.

== Reception ==
=== Critical response ===
Critical response of Nine Perfect Strangers
| Season | Rotten Tomatoes | Metacritic |
|---|---|---|
| 1 | 59% (111 reviews) | 54 (35 reviews) |
| 2 | 46% (26 reviews) | 50 (12 reviews) |

For the first season, the review aggregator website Rotten Tomatoes reports a 59% approval rating with an average rating of 6.1/10, based on 111 critic reviews. The critics consensus reads, "A meandering mystery may muddle its impact, but strong performances across the board from its eclectic ensemble mean Nine Perfect Strangers is never less than watchable." Metacritic, which uses a weighted average, assigned a score of 54 out of 100 based on 35 critics, indicating "mixed or average" reviews.

Ben Travers of IndieWire called out that the series was a "disappointing limited series. There's nothing special here, and whatever juice was stirred into Liane Moriarty's bestselling novel of the same name, that's been squeezed out of this languid, lost eight-episode drama". Alison Herman of The Ringer pointed out one of the biggest mistakes of the show was that it followed the HBO's big hit The White Lotus "too soon" and was "overstuffed and undercooked".

Alexis Nedd of Mashable compared the show to "smoothies" and commented that "the individually good pieces are some wonderful performances, an interesting premise, and a visually stunning location. Someone just forgot to hit blend." Making a comparison to the previous hit show Big Little Lies, which combined the same elements as Nicole Kidman starred based on a best-selling novel from Liane Moriarty and adapted by David E. Kelley, Rachel Cooke of New Statesman wrote "this time around, however, the glossy algorithm has failed to work.

Kevin E G Perry of The Independent called out "the stellar cast's obvious chemistry helps elevate a script that grows increasingly melodramatic as each of their characters' secrets are brought to light." David Bianculli of NPR praised the performance of leading lady Nicole Kidman as "it's yet another deep and challenging role she's inhabited since opting to focus on TV miniseries as well as movies" even though it "is more of an ensemble than a solo turn."

On Rotten Tomatoes, the second season holds an approval rating of 46% based on 26 critic reviews. The critics consensus states, "A less than savory return for the Psychedelics queen and her new posse of socialites places this second season of Nine Perfect Strangers into a definitive sophomore slump." On Metacritic, it has a weighted average score of 50 out of 100 based on 12 critics, indicating "mixed or average" reviews.

=== Audience viewership ===
On August 24, 2021, it was reported that the premiere was the most-watched Hulu original at the time.

=== Awards and nominations ===
| Year | Award | Category | Nominee(s) | Result | Ref. |
|---|---|---|---|---|---|
| 2021 | AACTA International Awards | Best Drama Series | Nine Perfect Strangers | Nominated | |
| 2021 | AACTA International Awards | Best Actress in a Series | Nicole Kidman | Nominated | |
| 2021 | Critics' Choice Television Awards | Best Supporting Actress in a Limited Series or TV Movie | Melissa McCarthy | Nominated | |
| 2021 | Satellite Awards | Best Actress in a Drama / Genre Series | Nicole Kidman | Nominated | |
| 2021 | Satellite Awards | Best Actor in a Supporting Role in a Series, Miniseries, Limited Series, or Motion Picture Made for Television | Bobby Cannavale | Nominated | |
| 2021 | Satellite Awards | Best Actor in a Supporting Role in a Series, Miniseries, Limited Series, or Motion Picture Made for Television | Michael Shannon | Nominated | |
| 2021 | NAACP Awards | NAACP Image Award for Outstanding Supporting Actress in a TV Movie, Limited-Series or Dramatic Special | Regina Hall | Won | |
