= Bige Önal =

Turkish actress (born 1990)

- Born: 1 February 1990 (age 36); Istanbul, Turkey
- Education: Saint-Benoît French High School; Istanbul Bilgi University
- Occupation: Actress
- Years active: 2010–present
- Parent(s): Erhan Önal; Mine Baysan

Bige Önal (born 1 February 1990) is a Turkish actress.

Önal was born on 1 February 1990 in Istanbul. Her father Erhan Önal is a former football player who played for Bayern Munich and Galatasaray. Her mother, Mine Baysan, is a former model. Her parents divorced when she was 9 years old. After graduating from Saint-Benoît French High School, she enrolled in Istanbul Bilgi University and finished her studies there.

Her first recognizable role was on youth series Elde Var Hayat in 2010, in which she portrayed the character of Yeliz. She was then cast in period series Benim Adım Gültepe alongside Ayça Bingöl, Mete Horozoğlu, İlker Kızmaz and Ekin Koç. Her portrayal of the character Nazlı served as a breakthrough in her career. In the 2020 Netflix series "Ethos" ("Bir Başkadır" in Turkish), Önal plays Hayrunnisa, the hodja's daughter, a character who loves her traditional parents, but who also seeks to choose to leave her village to get a college education, likes "foreign" music, and has a relationship with another woman.

== Filmography ==
Web Series
Year	Title	Role	Notes
2018	Bozkır	Tülay	Leading role
2020	Hakan: Muhafız	Berrin	Seasons 3–4
2020	Bir Başkadır	Hayrünnisa	Supporting role
2021	Yeşilçam	Gazel	Supporting role
TBA	Erşan Kuneri		

TV Series
Year	Title	Role	Notes
2007	Kısmetim Otel	Gizem	
2010	Elde Var Hayat	Yeliz	Recurring role
2010	Halil İbrahim Sofrası	Didem	Recurring role
2011–2012	Muhteşem Yüzyıl	Rita	Recurring role
2014	Yasak	Justine	Recurring role
2014	Benim Adım Gültepe	Nazlı	Leading role
2015	Maral: En Güzel Hikayem	Alara Görkem	Supporting role
2016	Göç Zamani	Didem	Supporting role
2017	Bodrum Masalı	Lal	Supporting role
2018	Tehlikeli Karım	Seda Çelik	Leading role
2020–2021	Sen Çal Kapımı	Selin Atakan	Supporting role

Film
Year	Title	Role	Notes
2017	Olanlar Oldu	Gizem	Supporting role
2017	Martıların Efendisi	Rüya/Birgül	Leading role
2021	Sen Ben Lenin	Nihal	Leading role
TBA	10 Saniye	Elif	Leading role
