= Kerem Bürsin =

Turkish actor (born 1987)

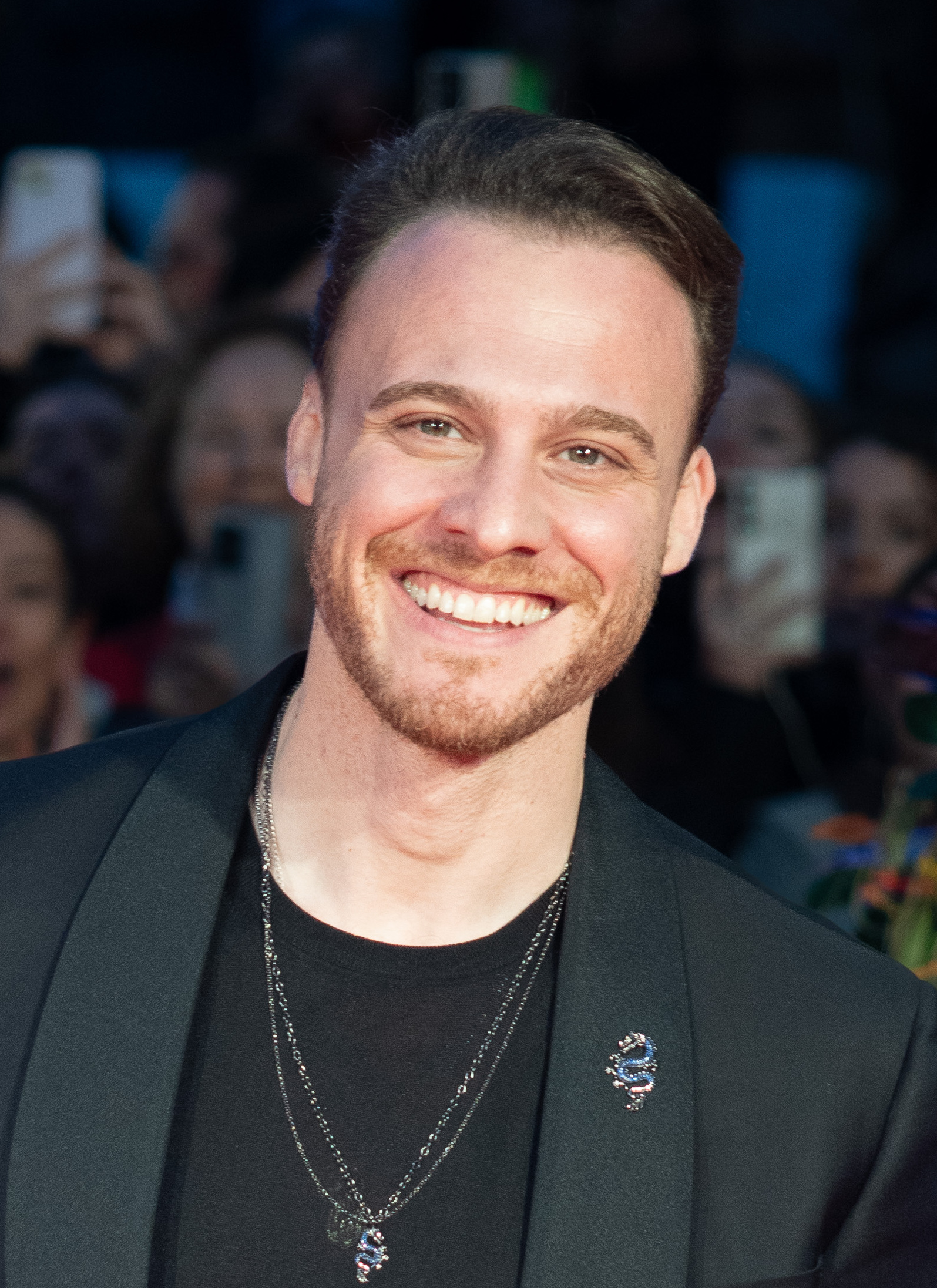
- Bürsin in 2024
- Born: 4 June 1987 (age 39); Istanbul, Turkey
- Education: Emerson College (Marketing Communications)
- Occupation: Actor
- Years active: 2006−present

Kerem Bürsin (born 4 June 1987) is a Turkish actor, known for his work predominantly in films, television and streaming series. After graduating from Emerson College in Marketing Communications Department, Bürsin began his acting career. He gained fame with the role in the TV shows Güneşi Beklerken (2013−2014) and Şeref Meselesi (2014−2015). Bürsin received attention after playing Ali Smith in romance action series Bu Şehir Arkandan Gelecek (2017) for which he won Seoul International Drama Awards for Best Actor.

He is best known for starring in the romantic comedy drama series Sen Çal Kapımı (2020–2021) for which he received critical acclaim and won several accolades including Turkey Youth Awards for Best Actor.

== Early life ==
Bürsin has lived in numerous countries including Scotland, Indonesia, the UAE, Türkiye, Malaysia, and the US. In 1999, at the age of 12 he moved with his family to the United States. He graduated from Emerson College's marketing communications department, and took acting lessons while he was in university. He was chosen as the best theater actor at a competition in high school in the US. Before he became an actor, he used to work as a driver.

== Career ==
Bürsin had previously appeared in American TV movies including Sharktopus in 2010. On 9 September 2013, he appeared on Line's commercial for social messaging application. Bürsin became known with his role as "Kerem Sayer" on Kanal D's Güneşi Beklerken alongside Hande Doğandemir In Çağan Irmak's movie Unutursam Fısılda played the role of a musician named Erhan. Bürsin follows both Hollywood-Turkish productions and prefers to use both English and Turkish languages in acting. He has also won the Seoul International Best Actor award.

Bürsin was cast in a leading role of "Serkan Bolat" in Sen Çal Kapımı ("You Knock on My Door") with Hande Erçel The series is produced by MF Yapım, directed by Yusuf Pirhasan, Ender Mıhlar, Altan Dönmez and its script is written by Ayşe Üner Kutlu. It premiered on FOX on 8 July 2020 receiving positive reviews as well as high ratings.

== Personal life ==
Bursin was in a four year relationship with his colleague Serenay Sarıkaya. They met on the set of Mavi's commercial in 2015 and broke up in 2019.

Bürsin was in a relationship with his co-star and actress Hande Erçel. The couple met on the set of Sen Çal Kapımı in 2020 and split up in 2022.

In 2024, he started dating Melisa Sabanci Tapan. They broke up in the second half of 2025. Shortly after, he began dating Turkish influencer Selin Yağcıoğlu.They split up after few months.

== Other work and public image ==
In addition to acting, Bürsin has appeared as brand ambassador for the Swiss watch Hublot. He is a prominent celebrity endorser for products and brands including BMW, clothing brand H&M, coffee brand Nescafe, and sports brands Nike and Under Armour. Bürsin has appeared on the cover of several magazines including Vogue Türkiye, Elle Türkiye, GQ Türkiye and Hello! Türkiye.

Bürsin was the spokesperson for the HeForShe movement, which advocates for women's rights. He became the first national spokesperson in Turkey. The announcement was made at a launching event in Istanbul gathering press and young HeForShe activists and partners. The solidarity movement initiated by the United Nations Gender Equality and Women's Empowerment Unit in 2014 to promote gender equality.

== Filmography ==
Films
Year	Title	Role	Notes	
2006	Thursday	Grauss		
2007	Strawberry Melancholy	Travis	Independent film	
2010	Wendigo	Andy	Independent film	
2010	Sharktopus	Andy Flynn	TV movies	
2013	Palace of the Damned	Adam	TV movies	
2014	Unutursam Fısılda	Erhan	Leading role	
2018	İyi Oyun	Ferhat	Supporting role	
2018	Can Feda	Onur Keskin	Leading role	
2022	Eflatun	Oflaz	Leading role	
2022	A todo tren 2 : Ahora son ellas	Kerem	Guest	
2024	Mavi Mağara	Cem	Amazon Prime Video Film, Leading role	
2024	Şımarık	Mete	Leading role	
Web
Year	Title	Role	Notes	Platform
2018	Yaşayamayanlar	Dmitry	Leading role	Blu TV, Netflix
2020–2021	Aynen Aynen	Deniz	Leading role	Blu TV
2025	Platonik: Mavi Dolunay Otel	Kaan	Leading role	Netflix
Television
Year	Title	Role	Notes	Channel
2013	Güneşi Beklerken	Kerem Sayer/Güneş Sayer	Leading role	Kanal D
2014	Ulan İstanbul	Yiğit Kılıç	Guest	
2014−2015	Şeref Meselesi	Yiğit Kılıç	Leading role	Kanal D
2017	Bu Şehir Arkandan Gelecek	Ali Smith	Leading role	ATV
2018−2019	Muhteșem İkili	Mustafa Kerim Can	Leading role	Kanal D
2020−2021	Sen Çal Kapımı	Serkan Bolat	Leading role	FOX
2023	Ya Çok Seversen	Ateş Arcalı	Leading role	Kanal D
2025	Çarpıntı	Aras Alkan	Leading role	Star TV

=== Short films ===
Short films
Year	Title	Role	Notes
2006	Rozar Man	Macalester	
2007	The Architect	Craig Belmont	
2008	Killian	Lennox	

=== Theater ===
Theater
Year	Title	Role	Notes
	Harold's Fall		
	Mariner		
	The Music Man		
	Fiddler on The Roof		
	All out		

=== As producer ===
- Kiss of Death (2010)
- Kelebekler (2018)
- Yaşamayanlar (2018)
- Iyi Oyun (2018)
- Seçim (2022)
- Mavi Mağara (2024)

=== As writer ===
- Mavi Mağara (2024)

=== Programs/Documentary ===
- İkinci Raunt (2024)

== Awards and nominations ==
Year	Award	Category	Work	Result	Ref
2014	GQ Turkey Men of the Year Awards	Rising Star Man of the Year	—N/a	Won	
2022	Turkey Youth Awards	Best TV Actor	Sen Çal Kapımı	Won	
2017	Turkey Youth Awards	Best TV Actor	Bu Şehir Arkandan Gelecek	Nominated	
2016	Turkey Youth Awards	Best Advertisement Movie with: (Serenay Sarıkaya)	Mavi	Won	
2016	Turkey Youth Awards	Best TV Actor	Şeref Meselesi	Nominated	
2017	Seoul International Drama Awards	Best Actor	Bu Şehir Arkandan Gelecek	Won	
2020	Yıldız Technical University	Most Admired Male Actor	Sen Çal Kapımı	Won	
2022	PRODU Awards	Best Actor in Foreign Series	Sen Çal Kapımı	Won	
2021	PRODU Awards	Best Actor	Sen Çal Kapımı	Nominated	
2021	Golden Butterfly Awards	Best Actor in a Comedy Series	Aynen Aynen	Nominated	
2021	Golden Butterfly Awards	Best Actor in a Romantic Comedy Series	Sen Çal Kapımı	Nominated	
2021	Golden Butterfly Awards	Best TV Couple with: (Hande Erçel)	Sen Çal Kapımı	Won	
2021	Ayakli Gazete TV Stars Awards	Best TV Series Couple with: (Hande Erçel)	Sen Çal Kapımı	Won	
2021	Ayakli Gazete TV Stars Awards	Best Actor (Romantic Comedy TV Series)	Sen Çal Kapımı	Won	
2021	Güzel Awards	Best Couple (with Hande Erçel)	Sen Çal Kapımı	Won	
2021	10th KTÜ Media Awards	Most Admired TV Series Couple (with Hande Erçel)	Sen Çal Kapımı	Won	
2021	Golden 61 Project Awards	Best Actor in a Romantic Comedy Series	Sen Çal Kapımı	Nominated	
2021	Golden 61 Project Awards	Best TV Series Couple	Sen Çal Kapımı(with Hande Erçel)	Won	
2022	Nubia Magazine	Most Handsome Turkish Actor	Sen Çal Kapımı	Won	
2022	Paris Art and Movie Awards	Best International Short Film, producer	Seçim	Nominated	
2022	Tirana International Film Festival	Short Film Competition, producer	Seçim	Nominated	
2022	YoFi Fest	Best international Short Film, producer	Seçim	Nominated	
2023	Golden 61 Project Awards	Best Actor in a Romantic Comedy Series	Ya Çok Seversen	Nominated	
2023	Golden 61 Project Awards	Best TV Series Couple	Ya Çok Seversen(with Hafsanur Sancaktutan)	Nominated	
2023	Golden Butterfly Awards	Best Actor in a Romantic Comedy Series	Ya Çok Seversen	Won	
2023	Ayakli Gazete TV Stars Awards	Best Actor in a Romantic Comedy Series	Ya Çok Seversen	Won	
