= Bahçelievler Anatolian High School =

- Bahçelievler Anadolu Lisesi
- Anatolisches Gymnasium Bahcelievler

Location
- Bahçelievler, Istanbul; Turkey
- 41.0033°N 28.8762°E

Information
- Established: September 30, 1985
- Headmaster: Abdurrahman Topuz
- Years offered: Preparation–12
- Gender: Co-educational
- Age: 13 to 18
- Colours: Grey, baby blue

Istanbul Bahçelievler Anatolian High School (German: Anatolisches Gymnasium Bahcelievler, Turkish: Bahçelievler Anadolu Lisesi) is an elite public high school recognized by German authorities as a Deutsche Auslandsschule, located in Bahçelievler, Istanbul, Turkey. It is one of the most selective high schools in Turkey.
