= Kiraz Mevsimi =

- Promo poster
- Also known as: Cherry Season
- Genre: Romance, Comedy, Drama
- Directed by: Eda Teksöz; Aslı Kahraman
- Starring: Serkan Çayoğlu; Özge Gürel; Nilperi Şahinkaya; Dağhan Külegeç; Nihal Işıksaçan
- Country of origin: Turkey
- Original language: Turkish
- No. of seasons: 2
- No. of episodes: 59

Production
- Executive producer: Charlotte Lucia
- Producer: Ali Gündoğdu
- Production locations: Istanbul; Italy
- Running time: 120 minutes
- Production company: Süreç Film

Original release
- Network: Fox (Turkey)
- Release: 4 July 2014 – 28 November 2015

Kiraz Mevsimi (English : Cherry Season) is a Turkish drama series ran on Fox TV. It is also dubbed in Arabic in the Middle East on MBC 4, Urdu in Pakistan on ARY Zindagi, Vietnamese in Vietnam on VTV, Indonesian in Indonesia on Trans TV and in Italian in Italy on Canale 5.

== Plot ==
A young woman named Öykü has a biggest dream is to become a successful fashion designer. She lives with her mother (Meral) and little brother Cem (Can). She's been in love with her best friend Burçu's brother Mete since childhood. But Mete does not feel the same. One day, Mete falls in love with Öykü's selfish friend Seyma, so Öykü gives up on Mete. Öykü then accidentally meets Mete's best friend and business partner Ayaz Dincer. Ayaz is a very handsome man, he falls in love with Öykü right away and even if she pushes him away, he keeps coming back. One day Burcu, Öykü's friend, sends a box of chocolates and a love note to her brother, but she signs it with Öykü's name. When Öykü finds out, she runs to Mete's office to take the present with the note before he sees it. When she arrives, Ayaz has already seen the present and is shocked to see it come from Oyku, he discovers that the girl he likes is in love with his best friend. In that moment Mete arrives and asks who that gift is for. Öykü, ashamed and afraid of his reaction, says that she brought the gift for Ayaz and tells Mete that she's in love with his friend, but of course it's a lie. So Ayaz and Öykü pretend to be a couple, until they start falling in love for real.

== Cast ==
- Özge Gürel - Öykü Acar
- Serkan Çayoğlu - Ayaz Dinçer
- Dağhan Külegeç - Mete Uyar
- Nilperi Şahinkaya - Şeyma Çetin
- Fatma Toptaş - Sibel Korkmaz
- Serkan Börekyemez - İlker Korkmaz
- Nihal Işıksaçan - Burcu Uyar
- Aras Aydın - Emre Yiğit
- Neslihan Yeldan - Önem Dinçer
- Ayşegül Ünsal - Meral Acar
- Nezih Cihan Aksoy - Olcay
- Tamer Berke Sarıkaya - Cem Acar
- Hakan Çimenser - Bülent Uyar
- Atilla Saral - Mehmet Karaylı
- Hasan Şahintürk - Kemal Acar
- Jale Arıkan - Monika Sessa

== Series overview ==
Season	Episode	Originally aired	
Season	Episode	Series premiere	Series finale
1	51	July 4, 2014	June 27, 2015
2	8	October 3, 2015	November 28, 2015
