= Şeref Meselesi =

- Genre: Serial drama Dramatic
- Written by: Mahinur Ergün; Elif Usman
- Directed by: Altan Dönmez
- Creative director: Gökçen Usta Çaylar
- Starring: Kerem Bürsin; Burcu Biricik; Yasemin Allen; Şükrü Özyıldız
- Composers: Salvatore Riccardi; Yıldıray Gürgen
- Country of origin: Turkey
- Original language: Turkish
- No. of seasons: 1
- No. of episodes: 26 (Int 76)

Production
- Executive producer: Ebru Sakal
- Producer: Elif Ayşe Durmaz
- Production location: Istanbul
- Running time: 120 minutes
- Production company: D Productions

Original release
- Network: Kanal D
- Release: November 23, 2014 – May 17, 2015

Şeref Meselesi (English: Matter of Respect), is a prime time Turkish television drama series produced by D Productions and broadcast from November 23, 2014, on Kanal D.

It is an adaptation of Italian 18-episode series published between 2006 and 2012, L'onore e il rispetto. Last episode was aired on May 17, 2015, at Kanal D channel.

== Plot ==
This series is about Kılıç family who moves to Istanbul from Ayvalık. Yiğit's father commits suicide because of the Mafia. Yiğit goes to take revenge from Mafia.

== Cast ==
Kerem Bürsin	Yiğit Kılıç	Emir's older brother. He gets into the mafia and sleeps with Kübra for revenge. He is in love with Sibel and plans to run away with her and marry her, but halts everything when he learns of Emir and Sibel's former relationship. He cares for Elif afterwards, and loves her more than anything. He plans to run away with Kübra and Elif when he is threatened to go to jail, but he is forced to marry Sibel to protect her. His enemy, Seyhan, kills Sibel when she takes a bullet for Yigit to protect him and Sibel dies. Yiğit, shocked by his beloved wife and unborn child's death leaves the mafia and İstanbul and returns after four years. His daughter, Elif, is kidnapped by Hakkı, a mafia leader. Yiğit is killed by the mafia to protect Emir and Elif.
Şükrü Özyıldız	Emir Kılıç	Yiğit's younger brother. He is a prosecutor. He fights against the mafia with police and other law officers. He marries Kübra for Kübra's honor and his niece but he is in love Kübra at short notice. In the end, his formality marriage turns into a real marriage. Elif knows him through her father for eighteen years. Emir has a son Yiğit, from Kübra.
Yasemin Allen	Sibel Ozer Kılıç	She is a model, Yiğit and Emir's neighbor. Also Kübra and Derya's childhood friend. She has a relationship with Emir but she prefers Bora to Emir, but it doesn't last long because she loves Yigit from the beginning. She has a relationship with Yiğit, but when Yiğit learns of her past, he leaves her. She acts in some promotions but Yiğit is opposed to this. Sibel makes peace with Kübra but it doesn't last long again. She is forced to marry Yiğit and tries to make the relationship work, but Yigit insists on getting a divorce to build a family for Elif. When she leaves home, she is killed by Seyhan to protect Yigit and dies in the hospital.
Burcu Biricik	Kübra Çapan Kılıç	Sadullah's daughter. She is deceived and falls for Yiğit's trap. She gets pregnant from Yiğit, but he refuses Kübra and the child. She gives birth to a girl, Elif, and makes a formality marriage with Emir. Kübra attempts suicide. After she gets better, she opens a pastry shop with Derya. Emir tells Kübra his true feelings, but Kübra doesn't say anything. When Yiğit comes to her, she doesn't trust him. Yiğit persuades Kübra to run away with him and not separate him from Elif, but he dashes her hopes again and marries Sibel. Kübra becomes closer to Emir. Yiğit proposes again to build a family for Elif, but she refuses. After four years, she gives birth to Emir's son, and she calls him Yiğit.
Şükran Ovalı	Derya Tanış	Kübra and Sibel's childhood friend. She kills her stepfather after an attempted rape. She has a relationship with Yiğit's enemy, Nihat. After Nihat's death, she marries Selim.
Alma Terzic	Gül	Russian prostitute and one of Yiğit's friends. Often employed by mafia bosses. She feels something for Yiğit.
Sezin Bozacı	Neriman	Sibel's mother. Indiscreet, she is a miser and tactless woman.
Kağan Uluca	Nihat	Mafia father. Yiğit's mother Zeliha dies because of him.
