= Hafsanur Sancaktutan =

Turkish actress (born 2000)

- Born: 20 March 2000 (age 26); Istanbul, Turkey
- Occupation: Actor
- Years active: 2015–present

Hafsanur Sancaktutan (born 20 March 2000) is a Turkish actress.

== Life and career ==
Hafsanur Sancaktutan was born in Istanbul in 2000. Her paternal family is of Laz descent from Rize. Her maternal family immigrated from Batumi, Adjara. Sancaktutan became interested in acting at a young age and started her career on stage. For her role in a number of theatrical adaptations, she received numerous local awards.

She made her television debut in 2018 with a recurring role in the TV series Gülperi as Fidan. In 2019, she was cast in a leading role in the series Aşk Ağlatır, portraying the character of "Ada Meryem Varlı". In 2021, she starred in the series Son Yaz as Yağmur Kara, which premiered on Fox. In 2023, she starred in the series Ya Çok Seversen, in the role of Leyla, which aired on Kanal D.

Between 2024-2025, she starred in the TV series Siyah Kalp where she played the role of Melek Çakırca on Show TV. This was her longest lasting TV series at 34 episodes. Her latest project is the series Kıskanmak, which is an adaption of the novel of Nahid Sırrı Örik of the same name. She played the role of Mükerrem Şen and the series aired on NOW.

== Filmography ==
Web Series
Year	Title	Role	Notes	Channel
2022	Dünyayla Benim Aramda	Sinem	Leading role	Disney+
TV Series
Year	Title	Role	Notes	Channel
2018	Gülperi	Fidan	Supporting role	Show TV
2019	Aşk Ağlatır	Ada Meryem Varlı	Leading role	Show TV
2021	Son Yaz	Yağmur Kara	Leading role	Fox
2022	Darmaduman	Derin	Leading role	Fox
2023	Ya Çok Seversen	Leyla Kökdal	Leading role	Kanal D
2024–2025	Siyah Kalp	Melek Çakirca	Leading role	Show TV
2025–2026	Kıskanmak	Mükerrem Şen Paşazade	Leading role	NOW
2026	Mercan Köşk	Cemre Demiray	Leading role	atv

== Theatre ==
Year	Title	Writer
2015	Kuralla Kuraldışı	Bertolt Brecht
2016	Otobüs	Sevilay Saral

== Awards and nominations ==
Year	Title
2015	Rotary Clubs – Best Actress Award – Kuraldışı ve Kural
2015	14th PAM – Commendable Player Award – Kuraldışı ve Kural
2015	Wish Schools – Best Supporting Actress Award – Kuraldışı ve Kural
2016	Terakki Foundation – Commendable Player Award – Otobüs
2021	9th TV Stars Walking Newspaper Awards — Rising Star of the Year
2021	ITU Business Engineering Club — Breakthrough Talent of the Year
2021	47th Golden Butterfly Awards — nominated for Best Actress and Best couple with Alperen Duymaz for Son Yaz
2023	9th Elle Style Awards — Style discovery of the year
2023	49th Golden Butterly Awards- Best actress in a romance or comedy
2024	10th TV Stars Walking Newspaper Awards — Best actress in a comedy
