= List of Turkish actors =

This is a list of notable Turkish actors.

1892 Born
Actress	Actor
	Muhsin Ertuğrul
1896 Born
Actress	Actor
Bedia Muvahhit	
1902 Born
Actress	Actor
Afife Jale	Sıtkı Akçatepe
Neyyire Neyir	
Mualla Sürer	
1908 Born
Actress	Actor
	Atıf Kaptan
	Avni Dilligil
1909 Born
Actress	Actor
	Nubar Terziyan
1910 Born
Actress	Actor
Feriha Tevfik	
1912 Born
Actress	Actor
	Hulusi Kentmen
1913 Born
Actress	Actor
	Muharrem Gürses
1914 Born
Actress	Actor
Leman Akçatepe	Mahir Canova
	Ertuğrul İlgin
1917 Born
Actress	Actor
Şükriye Atav	
Nezahat Tanyeri	
1918 Born
Actress	Actor
	Ali Şen
1919 Born
Actress	Actor
Cahide Sonku	Hüseyin Peyda
Melek Ökte	Hayri Esen
	Muzaffer Tema
1920 Born
Actress	Actor
Muazzez Kurtoğlu	Cüneyt Gökçer
	Kenan Pars
	Memduh Ün
1921 Born
Actress	Actor
Aliye Rona	
1924 Born
Actress	Actor
Lale Oraloğlu	Bülent Oran
1925 Born
Actress	Actor
	Münir Özkul
	Sadri Alışık
	Atıf Yılmaz
	Saadettin Erbil
1926 Born
Actress	Actor
	Kadir Savun
	Necdet Tosun
1927 Born
Actress	Actor
	Eşref Kolçak
	Turgut Özatay
	Nejat Uygur
1928 Born
Actress	Actor
Yıldız Kenter	Haldun Dormen
Neriman Köksal	Erol Taş
1929 Born
Actress	Actor
Mürüvvet Sim	Ayhan Işık
Belkıs Dilligil	İhsan Yüce
Aysel Gürel	
1930 Born
Actress	Actor
Adile Naşit	Yılmaz Gruda
	Öztürk Serengil
1931 Born
Actress	Actor
	Gazanfer Özcan
	Erol Keskin
	Zeki Müren
	Sait Ergenç
1932 Born
Actress	Actor
Leman Çıdamlı	Ekrem Bora
Muhterem Nur	Müşfik Kenter
	Ahmet Mekin
1933 Born
Actress	Actor
	Erol Günaydın
	Öztürk Serengil
	Hayati Hamzaoğlu
1934 Born
Actress	Actor
	Fikret Hakan
	Metin Serezli
	İzzet Günay
	Can Kolukısa
1935 Born
Actress	Actor
Ayten Erman	Arif Erkin Güzelbeyoğlu
Esin Eden	
1936 Born
Actress	Actor
Çolpan İlhan	Göksel Arsoy
Belgin Doruk	Tuncel Kurtiz
Gönül Yazar	Süleyman Turan
Tijen Par	Bilal İnci
1937 Born
Actress	Actor
Ayla Algan	Cüneyt Arkın
	Önder Somer
	Kamran Usluer
	Yılmaz Güney
1938 Born
Actress	Actor
	Halit Akçatepe
	Genco Erkal
	Tanju Gürsu
1939 Born
Actress	Actor
Leyla Sayar	Kartal Tibet
Çiğdem Selışık Onat	Yılmaz Köksal
1940 Born
Actress	Actor
Ayten Gökçer	Ediz Hun
Suna Keskin	
Nilüfer Aydan	
1941 Born
Actress	Actor
Güler Ökten	Şener Şen
	Metin Akpınar
	Burçin Oraloğlu
1942 Born
Actress	Actor
	Aykut Oray
	Tamer Yiğit
	Savaş Dinçel
	Zafer Ergin
	Mehmet Ulay
1943 Born
Actress	Actor
Fatma Girik	Zeki Alasya
Filiz Akın	Müjdat Gezen
Selda Alkor	Şevket Altuğ
Semra Sar	Serdar Gökhan
	Cihat Tamer
	Alp Öyken
	Atila Pekdemir
1944 Born
Actress	Actor
Feri Cansel	Kemal Sunal
Ayşen Gruda	Orhan Gencebay
Nevra Serezli	Engin Şenkan
Deniz Türkali	Tanju Korel
Nebahat Çehre	Sönmez Atasoy
Celile Toyon	Macit Koper
Serpil Tamur	Uğurtan Sayıner
Yıldız Kültür	Attila Olgaç
	Can Gürzap
1945 Born
Actress	Actor
Türkan Şoray	Salih Güney
Emel Sayın	Ferdi Tayfur
Işıl Yücesoy	Çetin Tekindor
Meral Çetinkaya	Kerem Yılmazer
Emel Göksu	Zihni Göktay
Zerrin Sümer	Gökhan Mete
	Atilla Arcan
1946 Born
Actress	Actor
Güven Hokna	Ercan Yazgan
Şerif Sezer	Coşkun Göğen
Ajda Pekkan	Yavuz Turgul
Esen Püsküllü	Cihan Ünal
Ayten Uncuoğlu	Salih Kalyon
	Halil Ergün
	Mustafa Alabora
	Köksal Engür
1947 Born
Actress	Actor
Hülya Koçyiğit	Kenan Işık
Hümeyra Akbay	Rutkay Aziz
Füsun Önal	Erol Evgin
Sermin Hürmeriç	Rüştü Asyalı
	Avni Yalçın
	Orhan Aydın
1948 Born
Actress	Actor
Mine Mutlu	Sertan Acar
	Erdal Özyağcılar
	Sümer Tilmaç
	Ünal Silver
	Sinan Bengier
	Metin Coşkun
1949 Born
Actress	Actor
Perran Kutman	Tarık Akan
Ayben Erman	Kadir İnanır
Sezer Güvenirgil	Nuri Sencer
	Aytaç Arman
	İlyas Salman
	Tarık Papuççuoğlu
	Cezmi Baskın
	Ulvi Alacakaptan
1950 Born
Actress	Actor
Hale Soygazi	Levent Kırca
	Ahmet Özhan
	Tamer Levent
	Kenan Bal
1951 Born
Actress	Actor
Aliye Uzunatağan	Ferhan Şensoy
Hülya Darcan	Yaman Okay
Selma Güneri	Nuri Alço
	Selahattin Taşdöğen
1952 Born
Actress	Actor
Zuhal Aktan	İbrahim Tatlıses
Fatma Karanfil	Mümtaz Sevinç
Bülent Ersoy	Ahmet Uğurlu
	Sezai Aydın
	Ali Erkazan
1953 Born
Actress	Actor
Nilgün Belgün	Selçuk Yöntem
Selma Kutluğ	Özkan Uğur
Gül Onat	Ahmet Sezerel
Berrin Koper	Turgay Tanülkü
İnci Şen	Kazım Akşar
1954 Born
Actress	Actor
Gülşen Bubikoğlu	Haluk Bilginer
Zeynep Değirmencioğlu	Recep Aktuğ
Müjde Ar	Menderes Samancılar
Betül Arım	
Melek Baykal	
Nilgün Atılgan	
Nur Sürer	
1955 Born
Actress	Actor
Ayşe Kökçü	Altan Erkekli
Suna Yıldızoğlu	Ahmet Arıman
	Ümit Acar
	Levent Özdilek
	Mustafa Uğurlu
1956 Born
Actress	Actor
Itır Esen	
Necla Nazır	
Oya Başar	
Meral Zeren	
Mehtap Ar	
Lale Mansur	
Ayşenil Şamlıoğlu	
İpek Bilgin	
1957 Born
Actress	Actor
Oya Aydoğan	Uğur Yücel
Perihan Savaş	Hasan Kaçan
Zuhal Olcay	Mehmet Ali Erbil
Derya Baykal	Tarık Ünlüoğlu
Ülkü Duru	Yusuf Atala
	Cahit Kaşıkçılar
1958 Born
Actress	Actor
Neriman Uğur	Erkan Can
Füsun Demirel	Haldun Boysan
	Süheyl Uygur
	Altan Gördüm
	Ege Aydan
	Yavuz Sepetçi
1959 Born
Actress	Actor
Demet Akbağ	Rasim Öztekin
Derya Alabora	Ömer Dönmez
Şahika Tekand	Musa Uzunlar
Meral Okay	Taner Birsel
	Cem Kurtoğlu
	Tayfun Sav
1960 Born
Actress	Actor
Nurseli İdiz	Güven Kıraç
Suzan Kardeş	Kerem Alışık
Binnur Şerbetçioğlu	Mahir Günşiray
Sacide Taşaner	Hakkı Ergök
Zerrin Nişancı	
1961 Born
Actress	Actor
Mine Teber	Zafer Algöz
Selda Özer	Uğur Polat
Tilbe Saran	Kenan Kalav
Sumru Yavrucuk	Mehmet Aslantuğ
Seray Gözler	Burak Sergen
Nursel Köse	Ali Düşenkalkar
Zuhal Gencer	Birol Ünel
	İştar Gökseven
	Serhat Özcan
	Ezel Akay
	Bülent Emin Yarar
	Orhan Aydın
1962 Born
Actress	Actor
Hatice Aslan	Levent Ülgen
Gülen Karaman	Hüseyin Avni Danyal
Ayda Aksel	Cem Emüler
Gamze Gözalan	Settar Tanrıöğen
	Kürşat Alnıaçık
	Kemal Kuruçay
1963 Born
Actress	Actor
Yaprak Özdemiroğlu	Peker Açıkalın
Hülya Avşar	Behzat Uygur
Aydan Şener	Mustafa Avkıran
Nergis Kumbasar	Şerif Erol
Zeynep Eronat	Atilla Saral
Gülizar Irmak	Hakan Vanlı
Zümrüt Cansel	Tolga Savacı
1964 Born
Actress	Actor
Zerrin Tekindor	Hüseyin Köroğlu
Filiz Taçbaş	Okan Bayülgen
Nazlı Tosunoğlu	Cem Davran
Lale Başar	Mesut Akusta
Yasemin Yalçın	Hakan Gerçek
	Tuncay Beyazıt
	Levent Tülek
	Yavuz Bingöl
	Hakan Boyav
	Şehsuvar Aktaş
1965 Born
Actress	Actor
Vahide Perçin	Oktay Kaynarca
Figen Evren	Ahmet Mümtaz Taylan
Semra Dinçer	Fikret Kuşkan
Hülya Gülşen	Engin Alkan
Laçin Ceylan	İlker İnanoğlu
	Cengiz Bozkurt
	Reha Özcan
	Melih Ekener
	Nail Kırmızıgül
1966 Born
Actress	Actor
Şenay Gürler	Özgür Ozan
Mihriban Er	Murat Daltaban
Mine Tüfekçioğlu	Volkan Severcan
	Ragıp Savaş
1967 Born
Actress	Actor
Zeyno Günenç	Tamer Karadağlı
Nilüfer Açıkalın	Yılmaz Erdoğan
	Levent Kazak
	Hamdi Alkan
	Şoray Uzun
	Uğur Çavuşoğlu
	Hakan Bilgin
	Veysel Diker
	Kadir Çöpdemir
1968 Born
Actress	Actor
Şebnem Sönmez	Can Yılmaz
Devrim Yakut	Cengiz Küçükayvaz
Esra Dermancıoğlu	Yıldıray Şahinler
Hülya Şen	Hakan Meriçliler
Özlem Çakar	
1969 Born
Actress	Actor
Meltem Cumbul	Tan Sağtürk
Nazan Kesal	Yetkin Dikinciler
Neslihan Yeldan	Hakan Yılmaz
Aslı Omağ	Murat Serezli
Çiçek Dilligil	Beyazıt Öztürk
Tuna Arman	Bekir Aksoy
Deniz Özerman	Yavuz Seçkin
Süeda Çil	Ümit Çırak
Gülşah Alkoçlar	
Birsen Dürülü	
Arzu Gamze Kılınç	
Bennu Yıldırımlar	
Aslı Öyken Taylan	
Neslihan Acar	
1970 Born
Actress	Actor
Berna Laçin	Erdal Beşikçioğlu
Sibel Can	Halit Ergenç
Asuman Dabak	Emre Altuğ
İpek Tenolcay	Emre Kınay
Buket Dereoğlu	Berat Yenilmez
Ceren Soylu	Engin Benli
Tülay Günal	Şafak Sezer
	Mehmet Özgür
	Erkan Petekkaya
	İsrafil Köse
	Berkan Şal
	Erdal Türkmen
1971 Born
Actress	Actor
Gülse Birsel	Olgun Şimşek
Janset Paçal	İlker Aksum
İclal Aydın	Murat Aygen
Günay Karacaoğlu	Kerem Kupacı
Ayçe Abana	Baki Davrak
Funda İlhan	Ayhan Taş
Özlem Türkad	Emrah
Melek Şahin	
Seren Serengil	
Ebru Karanfilci	
Günay Karacaoğlu	
İpek Tuzcuoğlu	
Nalan Kuruçim	
1972 Born
Actress	Actor
Binnur Kaya	Ata Demirer
İdil Fırat	Engin Günaydın
Yelda Reynaud	Yiğit Özşener
Gülben Ergen	Tardu Flordun
İnci Türkay	Levent Üzümcü
Arzu Balkan	Nejat İşler
Defne Samyeli	Barış Falay
İdil Fırat	Tardu Flordun
Yasemin Baştan	Burak Hakkı
Selda Özbek	Emre Karayel
Ufuk Kaplan	Serhat Tutumluer
Belma Canciğer	Serhan Yavaş
Mehtap Altunok	Levent Üzümcü
	Mahir İpek
	Ruhi Sarı
	Gökçe Özyol
	Devrim Nas
	Kâmil Güler
	Necmi Yapıcı
	Selim Erdoğan
	Özcan Deniz
	Uğur Aslan
	Dost Elver
1973 Born
Actress	Actor
Özlem Conker	Cem Yılmaz
Dolunay Soysert	Cansel Elçin
Hande Ataizi	Sinan Albayrak
Arzum Onan	Timuçin Esen
Şevval Sam	Vural Çelik
Deniz Uğur	Mehmet Usta
Özlem Tokaslan	Burak Kut
Devin Özgür Çınar	Tolga Tekin
Ayşe Tolga	Şinasi Yurtsever
Seray Sever	Şevket Çoruh
Nurseli Tırışkan	Murat Akkoyunlu
	Kutsi
1974 Born
Actress	Actor
Başak Köklükaya	Kenan İmirzalıoğlu
Yeşim Ceren Bozoğlu	Bülent Çetinaslan
Şebnem Dönmez	Yurdaer Okur
Pınar Altuğ	Tolga Çevik
Ebru Cündübeyoğlu	Bülent Çetinaslan
Hale Caneroğlu	Sermiyan Midyat
Ece Uslu	Gürkan Uygun
Özlem Çınar	Metin Yıldız
Yasemin Öztürk	Kaan Kural
Makbule Meyzinioğlu	Gökhan Atalay
Betül Çobanoğlu	Fırat Doğruloğlu
Aylin Kabasakal	Mehmet Bilge Aslan
Zeynep Gülmez	
Ayşegül Cengiz	
Süreyya Güzel	
Neşe Baykent	
1975 Born
Actress	Actor
Sanem Çelik	Ozan Güven
Fadik Sevin Atasoy	Murat Arkın
Şahnaz Çakıralp	Doğuş
Demet Tuncer	Murat Han
Zuhal Topal	Fırat Tanış
Didem Erol	Mehmet Günsür
Sevinç Erbulak	Barış Bağcı
Hasibe Eren	Selim Bayraktar
Defne Kayalar	Serhat Kılıç
Ayça Bingöl	Kenan Çoban
Ebru Aykaç	Haluk Piyes
Gökçe Yanardağ	İlker Kızmaz
Selen Uçer	Ufuk Özkan
Gülhan Tekin	Alper Kul
Ceren Erginsoy	Kıvanç Kasabalı
Ayten Soykök	Merih Ermakastar
Almila Uluer	Levent Sülün
Defne Joy Foster	Erdem Akakçe
Feyza Işık	Sinan Sümer
	Serkan Ercan
	Ahmet Saraçoğlu
	Metin Keçeci
1976 Born
Actress	Actor
Nurgül Yeşilçay	Ali Atay
Özge Özberk	Cemal Hünal
Emel Çölgeçen	Murat Cemcir
Nefise Karatay	Jess Molho
Cansın Özyosun	Tansel Öngel
Didem İnselel	Serkan Altunorak
Aylin Aslım	Serdar Orçin
Sibel Taşçıoğlu	Alişan
Ebru Akel	Fatih Al
Sema Şimşek	Turgut Tunçalp
Zara	Bülent Seyran
Ayta Sözeri	Gökhan Özoğuz
Asuman Krause	Ali İhsan Varol
Burcu Esmersoy	Ragga Oktay
	Alpaslan Özmol
	Ceyhun Yılmaz
	Atılgan Gümüş
	Cem Cücenoğlu
1977 Born
Actress	Actor
Ahu Türkpençe	Sinan Tuzcu
Canan Ergüder	Ertan Saban
Yeşim Büber	Ersin Korkut
Ceyda Düvenci	Onur Saylak
Görkem Yeltan	Çağlar Çorumlu
Ayça Varlıer	Memet Ali Alabora
Gülçin Santırcıoğlu	Keremcem
Emine Ün	Ali Sunal
Deniz Akkaya	Mustafa Üstündağ
Arzu Yanardağ	Sermet Yeşil
Ece Sükan	Ünal Yeter
Evrim Doğan	Bülent Şakrak
Sema Öztürk	Hakan Eratik
Nilgün Türksever	Umut Oğuz
Akasya Asıltürkmen	Bülent Çolak
Ebru Şallı	Serkan Keskin
Demet Şener	
Gülden Güney	
Nuray Uslu	
Zeynep Tokuş	
Irmak Ünal	
Mehtap Bayri	
Şenay Kösem	
Meltem Pamirtan	
Şeyla Halis	
Dilşad Bozyiğit	
Nurhayat Kavrak	
Açelya Elmas	
Yeliz Şar	
Nurhan Yılma	
Esin Gündoğdu	
Başak Sayan	
1978 Born
Actress	Actor
Özgü Namal	Okan Yalabık
Selma Ergeç	Nurettin Sönmez
Özge Özder	Tolga Karel
Mine Tugay	Tansu Biçer
Doğa Rutkay	Gürgen Öz
Ebru Özkan	Engin Hepileri
Yeliz Doğramacılar	Kayra Şenocak
Çağla Kubat	Ferit Aktuğ
Pelin Batu	Barış Kılıç
Tuğba Özay	Devrim Evin
Ahu Yağtu	Şevket Süha Tezel
Esra Ronabar	Caner Kurtaran
Senan Kara	Sinan Çalışkanoğlu
Seda Akman	Dağhan Külegeç
Elif Sönmez	Celil Nalçakan
Gizem Erdem	Alpay Kemal Atalan
Eylem Yıldız	Erdem Baş
Ayça İnci	Ercü Turan
Güliz Gençoğlu	Mert Kılıç
Tuğba Özay	Gökhan Tepe
Didem Uğurlu	Ali Aksöz
Yasemin Kozanoğlu	Cem Kılıç
İrem Erkaya	Serkan Kuru
	Kağan Uluca
1979 Born
Actress	Actor
Songül Öden	Murat Yıldırım
Aslı Tandoğan	Engin Altan Düzyatan
Çağla Şıkel	Kaan Taşaner
Evrim Akın	Uğur Pektaş
Şebnem Bozoklu	Alp Kırşan
Tülin Özen	Burak Satıbol
Melike Güner	Mehmet Ali Nuroğlu
Aysun Kayacı	Tayanç Ayaydın
Zeynep Beşerler	Rıza Kocaoğlu
Münire Apaydın	Çağdaş Onur Öztürk
Yeşim Dalgıçer	Nihat Altınkaya
Zeynep Aydemir	Osman Sonant
Sevinç Kıranlı	Gökhan Özen
	İlker Ayrık
	Burak Sarımola
	İbrahim Selim
	Timur Acar
	Fethi Kantarcı
	Toygan Avanoğlu
	Bülent Polat
	Emir Benderlioğlu
	Berke Üzrek
	Deniz Hamzaoğlu
	Bülent Emrah Parlak
	Tuna Kırlı
	Mehmet Akif Alakurt
	Fethi Kantarcı
	Pamir Pekin
1980 Born
Actress	Actor
Demet Evgar	Sarp Akkaya
Burçin Terzioğlu	Sarp Aydınoğlu
Nehir Erdoğan	Serdar Yeğin
Rojda Demirer	Okan Çabalar
Begüm Kütük	Arda Kural
Nur Fettahoğlu	Murat Boz
Nergis Öztürk	Öner Erkan
Cansu Dere	Caner Cindoruk
Burcu Kara	Ozan Çobanoğlu
Gaye Gürsel	Şahan Gökbakar
Zeynep Kankonde	Necip Memili
Selen Öztürk	Fahri Yardım
Aslı Orcan	Mert Turak
Meriç Acemi	Kenan Ece
Fulden Akyürek	İsmail Filiz
Esra Kızıldoğan	Şahan Gökbakar
Gözde Kansu	Caner Cindoruk
Bengi Öztürk	Kanbolat Görkem Arslan
Bahar Yanılmaz	Ferdi Sancar
İrem Altuğ	Uğur Bilgin
Ayçin İnci	Murat Eken
Özlem Düvencioğlu	Kartal Balaban
Feride Çetin	Ali Barışık
Nursel Ergin	Cemil Büyükdöğerli
Şenay Akay	Ferdi Kurtuldu
Derya Artemel	Eser Karabil
Zeynep Özder	Mehmet Şeker
İnci Pars Özgürgün	Orçun Kaptan
Aslı Mavitan	Anıl Altınöz
Meltem Kaptan	
İpek Tanrıyar	
Eren Balkan	
1981 Born
Actress	Actor
Tuba Ünsal	Tolgahan Sayışman
Deniz Çakır	Seçkin Özdemir
Gökçe Bahadır	Özgür Çevik
Vildan Atasever	Mert Fırat
Filiz Ahmet	Berk Hakman
Azra Akın	Ali İl
Pınar Aydın	Beyti Engin
Sezin Akbaşoğulları	Erdem Yener
Nihal Yalçın	Paşhan Yılmazel
Berfu Öngören	Şahin Irmak
Dilek Serbest	Umut Kurt
Nihan Büyükağaç	Anıl İlter
Sera Tokdemir	Sarp Apak
Derya Karadaş	Fırat Çelik
Gül Gölge	Sarp Levendoğlu
Başak Daşman	Rüzgar Aksoy
Ece Dizdar	Kaan Urgancıoğlu
İpek Türktan	Murat Ünalmış
Boncuk Yılmaz	Engin Akyürek
Ahu Sungur	Tolga Güleç
Özlem Türay	Alp Korkmaz
Selen Domaç	Serhan Arslan
Nurcan Şirin	Kemal Pekser
Yeliz Akkaya	Hakan Dinçkol
Pervin Bağdat	Haki Biçici
Sedef Akalın	Fehmi Karaarslan
Nil Günal	Meriç Özkaya
Güzin Alkan	
1982 Born
Actress	Actor
Bergüzar Korel	Buğra Gülsoy
Didem Balçın	Cengiz Coşkun
Tuba Büyüküstün	Berk Oktay
Melis Birkan	İbrahim Çelikkol
Gamze Özçelik	Erkan Avcı
Begüm Birgören	Alican Yücesoy
İpek Özkök	Ceyhun Fersoy
Çiğdem Batur	Tugay Mercan
Büşra Pekin	Ahmet Kural
Tuğçe Kazaz	Saygın Soysal
Yasemin Hadivent	Feyyaz Duman
Nesrin Cavadzade	Mert Öcal
Özge Borak	Kadir Doğulu
Hande Katipoğlu	Ozan Akbaba
Fatoş Kabasakal	Onur Buldu
Ayfer Dönmez	Onur Büyüktopçu
Zeynep Koçak	Barış Yıldız
Öykü Gürman	Halil İbrahim Ceyhan
Nazlı Ceren Argon	Ahmet Olgun Sünear
Özge Ulusoy	Gökmen Kasabalı
Sedef Avcı	
Ece Özdikici	
Bihter Dinçel	
Aylin Kontente	
Deniz Bolışık	
Aydan Taş	
Beste Bereket	
Demet Gül	
Fatma Toptaş	
Pınar Çağlar Gençtürk	
Esin Civangil	
Başak Kıvılcım Ertanoğlu	
1983 Born
Actress	Actor
Meryem Uzerli	Kıvanç Tatlıtuğ
Ezgi Mola	Erkan Kolçak Köstendil
Yıldız Asyalı	Sadi Celil Cengiz
Aslıhan Gürbüz	Yağmur Atacan
Saadet Aksoy	Bartu Küçükçağlayan
Naz Elmas	Murat Dalkılıç
Bade İşçil	Giray Altınok
Selin Demiratar	Osman Karakoç
Neslihan Aker	Oğuzhan Yıldız
Belçim Bilgin	Serhat Teoman
Ceren Benderlioğlu	Burak Yamantürk
Hatice Şendil	Ahmet Rıfat Şungar
Hare Sürel	Yiğit Kirazcı
Tuğçe Kumral	Cemal Toktaş
Ayça Erturan	Burak Alkaş
Burcu Gönder	Cem Gelinoğlu
Deniz Barut	Enis Arıkan
Leyla Göksun	Emre Kızılırmak
Seda Demir	İbrahim Büyükak
Esra Ruşan	Mehmet Aslan
Gülden Dudarık	Berk Erçer
Ececan Gümeci	Tuan Tunalı
Ece Güzel	Volkan Keskin
Burcu Gül Kazbek	Cihan Yenici
Arzu Oruç	Mert Öner
Gamze Topuz	Halil İbrahim Kurum
Bahar Selvi	
Gökçe Eyüboğlu	
1984 Born
Actress	Actor
Beren Saat	Burak Özçivit
Aslı Enver	Celal Al
Pelin Karahan	Ali Ersan Duru
Berrak Tüzünataç	Kaan Yılmaz
İpek Yaylacıoğlu	Hayrettin Karaoğuz
Hande Subaşı	İlker Kaleli
Gupse Özay	Alper Saldıran
Aslıhan Güner	Salih Bademci
Müge Boz	Eser Yenenler
İpek Erdem	Berk Cankat
Funda Eryiğit	Ushan Çakır
Birce Akalay	Ahmet Tansu Taşanlar
Melike İpek Yalova	Ferit Kaya
İpek Karapınar	İsmail Demirci
Müjde Uzman	Ahmet Varlı
Ekin Türkmen	Mehmetcan Mincinozlu
Seda Güven	Yusuf Akgün
Burcu Altın	Cihan Ercan
Meltem Yılmazkaya	Cenk Gürpınar
Melis Babadağ	Gürhan Altundaşar
Pınar Öğün	Oral Özer
Sevtap Özaltun	Yılmaz Bayraktar
Gözde Türkpençe	İlker Yiğen
Hilal Uysun	Erman Bacak
Gümeç Alpay	Cihan Talay
Dilşad Çelebi	
Eda Özerkan	
Perihan Ünlücan	
Duygu Yetiş	
Sevda Dalgıç	
Asena Tuğal	
Gizem Soysaldı	
Bahar Akça	
Ezgi Çelik	
Neşem Akhan	
Pınar Bibin	
1985 Born
Actress	Actor
Gülçin Ergül	Fırat Albayram
Türkü Turan	Çağkan Çulha
Ceren Moray	Onur Tuna
Melisa Sözen	İsmail Hacıoğlu
Seda Bakan	Birkan Sokullu
Hande Doğandemir	Burak Sevinç
Hazal Türesan	Ümit Erdim
Elçin Sangu	Emrah Kaman
Yasemin Özilhan	Oğuzhan Koç
Sinem Öztürk	Kemal Uçar
Şükran Ovalı	Burak Aksak
Bala Atabek	İnanç Konukçu
Şebnem Hassanisoughi	Burak Sevinç
Algı Eke	Onur Ünsal
Cemre Kemer	Serkan Şenalp
Toprak Sağlam	Can Nergis
Hayal Garip	Ali Barkın
Billur Yazgan	Selim Gülgören
Derya Beşerler	Ayhan Hülagü
Gözde Mukavelat	Barış Aytaç
Deniz Sipahi	Kaan Turgut
Bengü Ergin	Balamir Emren
Duygu Karaca	
1986 Born
Actress	Actor
Pelin Akil	Çağrı Şensoy
Zeynep Çamcı	Olgun Toker
İrem Sak	Eren Hacısalihoğlu
Gonca Vuslateri	Engin Öztürk
Fahriye Evcen	Furkan Palalı
Özge Özpirinçci	Taner Ölmez
Yıldız Çağrı Atiksoy	Kaan Yıldırım
Gülcan Arslan	Deniz Celiloğlu
Açelya Topaloğlu	Caner Özyurtlu
Özlem Yılmaz	Mehmet Yılmaz Ak
Merve Dizdar	Görkem Sevindik
Selen Soyder	İbrahim Kendirci
Ayça Eren	Erkan Meriç
Selen Seyven	Gün Koper
Biğkem Karavus	Çağrı Şensoy
Yeliz Kuvancı	Emre Yetim
Özge Sezince Varley	Onur Atilla
Oya Okar	Cemil Şahin
Neşe Sayles	Gün Koper
Pınar Tuncegil	Andrey Polyanin Stan
Gizem Akman	Ceyhun Mengiroğlu
Nilay Erdönmez	Rıdvan Aybars Düzey
Açelya Özcan	Baran Erdoğan
Setenay İnal	Cavit Çetin Güner
Aliona Bozbey	
Burcu Binici	
Neslihan Arslan	
Burcu Tuna	
Melisa Toros	
Pınar Dikici	
Şive Şenözen	
Mine Kılıç	
Ayşin Yesim Çapanoglu	
Nihan Aker	
Elif Nur Kerkük	
1987 Born
Actress	Actor
Damla Sönmez	Çağlar Ertuğrul
Sinem Kobal	Uraz Kaygılaroğlu
Öznur Serçeler	Barış Arduç
Ceyda Kasabalı	Serkan Çayoğlu
Özge Gürel	Berkay Ateş
Merve Sevi	Uğur Güneş
Merve Boluğur	Kerem Bürsin
Ezgi Asaroğlu	Gökhan Alkan
Sümeyra Koç	Ümit Kantarcılar
Hande Soral	Burak Sağyaşar
Aslıhan Güner	Halil Babür
Öykü Çelik	Barış Alpaykut
Burçin Abdullah	Gökhan Keser
Seda Türkmen	Yasin Çam
Dicle Alkan	Haluk Levent Karataş
Damla Debre	Ümit Erlim
Nurhak Mine Söz	Yiğit Uçan
Dilara Aksüyek	Ali Yörenç
Gözde Duru	Mustafa Açılan
Elvan Dişli	
İlkin Tüfekçi	
Tuğçe Karabacak	
Begüm Çağla Taşkın	
Güneş Sayın	
Gonca Sarıyıldız	
Gamze Karaduman	
Duygu Sarışın	
Tuğçe Altuğ	
Cansu Dağdelen	
Mutlunur Lafçı	
Gülçin Kültür Şahin	
Özcan Tekdemir	
Gaye Turgut Evin	
Pelin Öztekin	
Ceyda Olguner	
Ayçin Tuyun	
Berna Üçkaleler	
Meltem Miraloğlu	
1988 Born
Actress	Actor
Ezgi Eyüboğlu	Metin Akdülger
Ceyda Ateş	Ulaş Tuna Astepe
Gözde Kaya	Şükrü Özyıldız
Hazal Filiz Küçükköse	Eren Vurdem
Nilperi Şahinkaya	Korhan Herduran
Ecem Özkaya	Fatih Artman
Olcay Yusufoğlu	Ahmet Kayakesen
Elvin Levinler	Uğur Uzunel
Cansu Tosun	Güven Murat Akpınar
Esin Varan	Gürbey İleri
Oya Unustası	Can Sipahi
Beyza Şekerci	Burak Serdar Şanal
Şafak Pekdemir	Mehmet Korhan Fırat
Sitare Akbaş	Feyyaz Yiğit
Selin Yeninci	Hakan Kurtaş
Merve Oflaz	Doğu Demirkol
Gizem Hatipoğlu	Mustafa Kazar
Şeyma Korkmaz	Eren Dinler
Elif Özkul Elsayit	Aykut Akdere
Tuğçe Taşkıran	Tarık Ündüz
Hülya Diken	Doğa Konakoğlu
Funda Güray	Burak Topaloğlu
Ayfer Tokatlı	Kadir Polatçı
Merve Kızıl	Özgün Karaman
Şahika Koldemir	Anıl Çelik
Yasemin Sakallıoğlu	Ömer Güney
Sanem Yeles	Kemal Burak Alper
Dila Danışman	Yiğit Yapıcı
Elit Andaç Çam	
1989 Born
Actress	Actor
Burcu Biricik	Edip Tepeli
Yasemin Allen	Yalçın Hafızoğlu
Farah Zeynep Abdullah	Cihangir Ceyhan
Selin Şekerci	Aras Aydın
Burcu Özberk	Gökberk Demirci
Burcu Kıratlı	Can Yaman
Ergül Miray Şahin	Aksel Bonfil
Berna Koraltürk	Yunus Narin
Ceren Hindistan	Boğaç Aksoy
Başak Parlak	Samet Sırmalı
Begüm Öner	Caner Nalbantoğlu
Müge Uyar	Arda Artun Konak
Fulya Zenginer	Atakan Yarımdünya
Ayşecan Tatari	Mekin Sezer
Aslı İnandık	Arif Diren
Ece Bozkaya	Muharrem Türkseven
Ecem Erkek	Efe Tunçer
Dilara Büyükbayraktar	Ali Yasin Özegemen
Ecem Karavus	
Ceren Taşçı	
Selen Korkutan	
Cemre Ebüzziya	
Reyhan Nur Çalıkoğlu	
Hazal Adıyaman	
Melis İşiten	
Ecem Çalık	
Esra Şengünalp	
Merve Akaydın	
1990 Born
Actress	Actor
Ece Çeşmioğlu	Çağatay Ulusoy
Eda Ece	Aras Bulut İynemli
İrem Helvacıoğlu	Birand Tunca
Hazal Kaya	Selahattin Paşalı
Derya Şensoy	Atakan Çelik
Tuğba Melis Türk	Bora Akkaş
Zeynep Tuğçe Bayat	Cihat Süvarioğlu
Öykü Karayel	Furkan Andıç
Bige Önal	Bora Cengiz
Selin Sezgin	Akın Akınözü
Nezaket Erden	Alp Navruz
Hazar Motan	Emre Kıvılcım
Gülper Özdemir	Ozan Dolunay
Yağmur Tanrısevsin	Sercan Badur
Tuvana Türkay	Fırat Altunmeşe
Almila Bağrıaçık	Ekin Mert Daymaz
Sevcan Yaşar	Utku Ateş
Damla Aslanalp	Yiğit Özyer
İdil Sivritepe	Alican Aytekin
Fatmagül Fakı	Barış Küçükgüler
Cansu Gültekin	Recep Güneysu
Ceren Yılmaz	Rami Narin
Yüsra Geyik	Orçun Oran
Tuğba Çom	Can Sertaç Adalıer
Merve Şen	Muammer Tali
Buse Varol	Deniz Gürzumar
Yeşim Tomay	Batuhan Aydar
Zeynep Elçin	Batuhan Ekşi
Naz Göktan	Cihat Süvarioğlu
Övül Özbay	Cem Anıl Kenar
Melisa Akman	Çağrı Çıtanak
Dilhan Aras	Münir Can Cindoruk
Belfu Benian	Anıl Altan
Alicia Kapudağ	Sarp Can Köroğlu
Ceren Koç	Anıl Tetik
Kimya Gökçe Aytaç	Ali Yağcı
	Mahsun Karaca
1991 Born
Actress	Actor
Deniz Baysal	Tolga Sarıtaş
Melisa Aslı Pamuk	Burak Deniz
Seray Kaya	Berk Atan
Bensu Soral	Feyyaz Şerifoğlu
Deniz Baysal	Doğaç Yıldız
Hilal Altınbilek	Onur Durmaz
Açalya Samyeli Danoğlu	Serkay Tütüncü
Gözde Mutluer	Yusuf Çim
Gözde Çığacı	Yağız Can Konyalı
Tülin Ece Yazkan	Ali Burak Ceylan
Merve Erdoğan	Batuhan Begimgil
Esra Kılıç	Can Kurt Kalav
Başak Gümülcinelioğlu	Batuhan Bayar
Elçin Afacan	Uğur Kurul
Seren Şirince	Merdin Deniz
Begüm Akkaya	Onur Durmaz
Bestemsu Özdemir	Caner Şimşek
Tuğçe Kurşunoğlu	Ali Akdal
Su Kutlu	Yunus Emre Terzioğlu
Sibel Şişman	Aykut Yılmaz
Aslı Samat	Serkan Rutkay Ayıköz
Defne Bölükbaşıoğlu	Barış Murat Yağcı
Buse Sinem İren	Tolga Canbeyli
Ferzan Hekimoğlu	Sezer Arıçay
Çağla Özavcı	Kerem Arslanoğlu
Nazlı Senem Ünal	
Deniz Baydar	
Beste Kanar	
1992 Born
Actress	Actor
Demet Özdemir	Burak Çelik
Serenay Sarıkaya	Alperen Duymaz
Neslihan Atagül	Boran Kuzum
Esra Bilgiç	Ekin Koç
Deniz Işın	Sefa Doğanay
Gizem Karaca	Safa Sarı
Zehra Yılmaz	Burak Tozkoparan
Ayça Ayşin Turan	Mehmet Aykaç
Hayal Köseoğlu	Turan Cihan Şimşek
Gökçe Akyıldız	Hamza Yazıcı
Ecem Uzun	Hilmi Cem İntepe
Deniz Durmaz	Ogeday Girişken
Buse Arslan	Erdem Kaynarca
Eva Dedova	Dorukhan Kenger
Sedef Şahin	Tolga Ortancıl
Hazal Şenel	Michele Cedolin
Cemile Canyurt	Ertunç Tuncer
Merve Çağıran	Batuhan Soyaslan
Melissa Değer	Metin Pıhlıs
Cansu Demirci	Cankat Aydos
Deniz Çom	Metehan Şahiner
Sultan Elif Taş	Evliya Aykan
Çağla Demir	Oğuzhan Karbi
Müge Bayramoğlu	Genco Özak
	Caner Şahin
1993 Born
Actress	Actor
Pınar Deniz	Semih Ertürk
Hande Erçel	İsmail Ege Şaşmaz
Ege Kökenli	Deniz Can Aktaş
Elifcan Ongurlar	Hasan Denizyaran
Beste Kökdemir	Tolga Mendi
Büşra Develi	Mert Yazıcıoğlu
Sevda Erginci	Halit Özgür Sarı
Gözde Türker	Cemrehan Karakaş
Zeynep Bastık	Yiğit Kalkavan
Gizem Güven	Alperen Şahin
Tuğçe Açıkgöz	Ufuk Tevge
Cemre Gümeli	Umutcan Ütebay
Buse Narcı	
Leyla Feray	
Sinem Ünsal	
Gizem Arıkan	
Amine Gülşe Özil	
Jessica May	
Damla Colbay	
İlay Erkök	
Ezgi Şenler	
Serenay Aktaş	
Nilay Deniz	
Aslı Turanlı	
Dilara Gül Demiral	
Seren Deniz Yalçın	
Sesil Ece Gökseven	
Pelin Abay	
Hazal Benli	
Elif Atakan	
Eylül Su Sapan	
Zülal Yürekli	
1994 Born
Actress	Actor
Ahsen Eroğlu	Cem Yiğit Üzümoğlu
İlayda Çevik	Berker Güven
Almila Ada	Serhan Onat
Melis Tüzüngüç	Efekan Can
Ebru Şahin	Yılmaz Kunt
Suğdem Gözalır	Cenan Adıgüzel
Büşra Ayaydın	Ahmet Hilmi Deler
Elif Doğan	Emin Günenç
Sezgi Sena Akay	Murat Göçmez
Elit İşcan	Furkan Göksel
Ecem Baltacı	Kaan Altay Köprülü
Melis Gürhan	Mustafa Mert Koç
Aslı Sümen	Baran Bölükbaşı
Cansu Tuman	Kaan Sevi
Ayşegül Yılmaz	
Merve Hazer	
İlayda Aydın	
Ebru Yücel	
Nil Özkul	
Deniz Altan	
Sena Çakır	
1995 Born
Actress	Actor
Gülsim Ali	Burak Yörük
Özge Özacar	Onur Seyit Yaran
Aybüke Pusat	Cemal Can Canseven
Hazal Subaşı	Yiğit Koçak
Aslıhan Malbora	Kubilay Aka
Dilan Çiçek Deniz	Emre Dinler
Eda Dunisa Şölenci	Mert Doğan
Aslı Bekiroğlu	Adil İrfanoğlu
Yağmur Ün	Atakan Yılmaz
Binnur Işık	Sina Özer
Beril Pozam	Ali Gözüşirin
Alara Turan	Ulvi Kahyaoğlu
Rüya Helin Demirbulut	Faruk Aran
Hümeyra Çetin	Berk Ali Çatal
Cansu Türedi	
Tuana Gizem Uzunlar	
Selin Kahraman	
Nil Keser	
Yasmin Erbil	
Gizem Güneş
1996 Born
Actress	Actor
Melisa Şenolsun	Emir Özden
İlayda Alişan	Burak Can
Serel Yereli	Erdem Şanlı
Aleyna Solaker	Oktay Çubuk
Ecem Çalhan	Onur Bay
Özgü Kaya	Kerimhan Duman
Ecem Sena Bayır	
Feride Hilal Akın	
Gökçe Aydın	
Bilgi Aydoğmuş	
1997 Born
Actress	Actor
Biran Damla Yılmaz	İdris Nebi Taşkan
Leyla Tanlar	Emre Bey
Melis Sezen	Caner Topçu
Yasemin Yazıcı	Taro Emir Tekin
Özge Yağız	Recep Usta
Serra Pirinç	Batuhan Sert
Feyza Sevil Güngör	Enes Demirkapı
Çağla Irmak	Utku Coşkun
Bahar Şahin	
Merve Sevin	
Sera Kutlubey	
Ece Yüksel	
Özge Akdeniz	
1998 Born
Actress	Actor
Afra Saraçoğlu	Burak Dakak
Nilsu Berfin Aktaş	Ege Tanman
Dilara Kurtulmuş	Aytaç Şaşmaz
Alina Boz	Atakan Özkaya
Sibel Kasapoğlu	
Devrim Özkan	
Eslem Akar	
Serra Arıtürk	
Zeynep Alkan	
İlayda Akdoğan	
Ceren Balcı	
1999 Born
Actress	Actor
Miray Daner	Arda Anarat
Tara McMillen	Durukan Çelikkaya
Cemre Baysel	Enes Koçak
Lilya İrem Salman	Atakan Hoşgören
Buse Meral	
Özge Törer	
Melisa Döngel	
Sümeyye Aydoğan	
Rabia Soytürk	
Sıla Türkoğlu	
Merih Öztürk	
Ecem Atalay	
Simay Barlas	
Elif Ceren Balıkçı	
Dilara Sümbül	
Aslıhan Karalar	
Asude Kalebek	
2000 Born
Actress	Actor
Miray Akay	Hayat Van Eck
Jennifer Boyner	Can Bartu Arslan
Jasmine Simin Berkiş	
Hafsanur Sancaktutan	
Aleyna Tilki	
Doğa Zeynep Doğuşlu	
2001 Born
Actress	Actor
Reyhan Asena Keskinci	Ahmet Haktan Zavlak
Esila Umut	
İpek Filiz Yazıcı	
Kayra Zabcı	
Ece Aydemir	
Sude Zülal Güler	
Derin Beşikçioğlu	
Eylül Ersöz	
2002 Born
Actress	Actor
Çağla Şimşek	Kaan Miraç Sezen
Mina Derman	Şahin Kendirci
Eylül Tumbar	
Yağmur Yüksel	
2003 Born
Actress	Actor
Aleyna Özgeçen	
Ezgi Gör	
Derya Pınar Ak	
Melis Mutluç	
2004 Born
Actress	Actor
Helin Kandemir	Berat Efe Parlar
Sena Gençtürk	
Duru Kınay	
2005 Born
Actress	Actor
Su Burcu Yazgı Coşkun	Ata Berk Mutlu
Mina Demirtaş	
Merve Ateş	
2006 Born
Actress	Actor
Tuana Naz Tiryaki	Özgür Ege Nalcı
Alisa Sezen Sever	
Çağla Naz Kargı	
Ecrin Su Çoban	
Balım Gaye Bayrak	
2007 Born
Actress	Actor
	Çağan Efe Ak
	Yağız Kılınç
2008 Born
Actress	Actor
Leya Kırşan	Aybars Kartal Özson
2009 Born
Actress	Actor
Beren Gökyıldız	
