= Aygun Kazimova discography =

- Studio albums: 9
- Live albums: 1
- Compilation albums: 11
- Singles: 35
- Music videos: 72

The discography of Aygun Kazimova, Azerbaijani pop, dance, folk dance and jazz singer, consists of 9 studio albums, one remix album, more than thirty singles, and over 70 music videos.

== Albums ==
=== LP albums ===
- Eldar Mansurovun mahnıları / Bayatı (1990)

=== Studio albums ===
List of Studio Albums
Title	Year	Producer
"Ömrüm - Günüm"	1995	Baki-Raks
" Ah...!"	1999	
"Aygün"	2000	
"Sevdim"	2001	
"Sevgi gülləri"	2003	
"Sevərsənmi"	2005	Səbuhi AMD
"Sevdi ürək"	2005	Mirjalal Gurbanov
"Yenə tək"	2008	
"Coffee from Colombia"	2014	Doğan Music Company

=== Compilation albums ===
List of Compilation Albums
Title	Year	Producer
"Aygün Kazımova, Vol. 1"	2008	Süper Müzik Yapım
"Aygün Kazımova, Vol. 2"	2008	Süper Müzik Yapım
"Aygün Kazımova, Vol. 3"	2008	Süper Müzik Yapım
"Aygün Kazımova, Vol. 4"	2008	Süper Müzik Yapım
"Səni Belə Sevmədilər"	2015	Aygün Music
"Sevdi Ürək"	2012	
"Ya Devushka Vostochnaya"	2013	
"Aygün Kazımovanın ifaları"	2016	Eldar Mansurov
"Orasına Burasına"	2017	
"By SS Production"	2020	
"Remakes"	2020	

=== Live albums ===
Name	Year
Crystal Hall	2020

=== Karaoke albums ===
Name	Year
18-	2019

=== EPs ===
Name	Year
Duy	2018
Ya v Nirvane	2021

== Singles ==
Name	Year
Petrol	2011
Qoy bütün aləm bizdən danışsın	2012
Hayat Ona Güzel	2012
İkinci Sen (feat. Sinan Akçıl)	2012
İkinci Sen (Batu Çaldıran Remix) (feat. Sinan Akçıl)	2012
Gol	2012
Telafisi Yok	2013
Sənə Xəstəyəm	2014
Unutmuşam	2015
Aklım Başıma Geldi	2015
Arama beni	2016
Seni Böyle Sevmediler	2017
S.U.S.	2017
Hardasan	2018
Yakıştın Bana (feat. Rauf)	2018
AYA (feat. Rauf)	2018
Paramparça	2019
Dola Mənə Qolunu (feat. Rəsul Əfəndiyev)	2019
Mən Gəlirəm	2019
Kim Dinler Sizi	2019
Gedək Şəhərdən (feat. Rəsul Əfəndiyev)	2019
Jalma (feat. Philipp Kirkorov)	2019
Ehtiyacım Var	2019
Can Azərbaycan (feat. Philipp Kirkorov)	2019
Bizdən Danışaq (feat. Rauf)	2020
Jalma (Remake) (Solo)	2020
Deli fikirler	2020
İcazəli (feat. Miri Yusif)	2020
Paramparça (acoustic)	2020
Əsgər Marşı	2020
Vətən oğlu	2020
Yarımdı o (feat. Rəsul Əfəndiyev)	2021
Bu qadın	2021
Söylə	2021
Azərbaycan Türkiyə (Remake)	2021
De	2021
Denizin Ortasında	2021
Lya Lya Fa	2021
Азербайджан (Azerbaijan) (feat. Emin)	2021
Saxla Şəkilləri (feat. Rauf)	2022
Ey Mənim Dünyam (2022 Remake)	2022
Погоди, постой (Wait, wait) (feat. Rəsul Əfəndiyev)	2022
Qorxuram	2023
Vəfasızlar Unudulmur	2023
Dəyməzmiş	2023
Çalxala	2023
Parol	2023
Bilmək Olmaz	2024
Sağ-Salamat	2024
Maşallah (feat. Genco Ecer)	2024

== Charted songs ==
Title	Year	Peak chart position	Album
Title	Year	RUS Stream.	Album
"Ya tvoy stress (S.O.S. cover)" (with Sabi)	2025	18	Non-album single

== Music videos ==
Song	Year	Director	Album
Bu sevgi	1989		
Uzaqlıq	1989		
Ələrini uzat gülüm	1993		
Apar məni	1994		
Ah, Vətən	1994		
Son gecə	1994		
Bizim Qızlar	1994	İlqar Əkbərov	Ömrüm-günüm
İtgin gəlin	1994	Mirjalal Gurbanov	
Gözləyirəm	1995		
Sənsiz Bir Günüm Olmasın	1995		
Yaz yağışı (feat. Cavanşir Quliyev)	1997		
Şəhidlər	1997		
Ömrüm-günüm	1997	Nailə Əkbərova	Ömrüm-günüm
Mavi dünyamsan	1998		
Gecələr keçir	1998	Aqil M. Quliyev	
Vokaliz	1998	Aqil M. Quliyev	
Sənsizliyim	1999	Aqil M. Quliyev	
Tənha Qadın	2000	Loğman Kərimov	
Matros	2000	Ülviyyə Könül	Aygün
Я и ты	2000	Ülviyyə Könül	Aygün
Məhəbbət Üçbucağı	2000	Ülviyyə Könül	Aygün
Uyma	2001	Ülviyyə Könül	Sevdim
Sevdim	2001	Ülviyyə Könül	Sevdim
Tez gəl	2001	Ülviyyə Könül	Sevdim
Şəklimi çək	2001	Ülviyyə Könül	Sevdim
İndi Sənsiz	2001	Basa Potskhishvili	
Depresyondayım	2002	Ülviyyə Könül	
Sevgilim, Süz	2002	Aqil M. Quliyev	
Aşiqəm Sənə/Sigara	2002	Nailə Əkbərova	
Vətən Anadır	2003	Nailə Əkbərova	
Bir Söz Yetər	2003	Aygün Kazımova	
Xatirə (feat. İlqar Muradov)	2003	Fuad Əlişov	
Son söz	2004	Basa Potskhishvili	
Bağlanıram (feat. Namiq Qaraçuxurlu)	2004	Gülər Həsənli	
Mən Aygünəm	2005	Fuad Əlişov	
Azərbaycan (feat. İlqar Muradov & Elton Hüseynəliyev)	2005	Orman Çingizoğlu	
Səndən Başqa	2006	Zafer Ünlü	
Öpsən	2006	Fuad Əlişov	
Sevirəm (feat. Namiq Qaraçuxurlu)	2007	Fuad Əlişov	
Sevən Qəlbim	2007	Zöhrab Ağayev	
Gülər	2007	Aqil M. Quliyev	
İstərəm	2007	Fuad Əlişov	
Sevgi nəğməsi	2007	Aqil M. Quliyev	
Gecələr sənsiz	2007	"Sona-Film" Kinokompaniyası	
Güləş (feat. Alim Qasımov & Şeron qrupu)	2007		
Yenə tək	2007	Ülviyyə Könül	
Təkcə Səni	2009	Fuad Əlişov	
Petrol	2010	Basa Potskhishvili	Petrol
Düşün məni	2011	Murat Küçük	
Səssiz Sinema	2012	Murat Küçük	
İkinci Sen	2012	Murat Küçük	İkinci Sen
Qol	2012	Murat Küçük	Qol
İkinci Sen (Batu Çaldıran Remix)	2012	Murat Küçük	İkinci Sen (Batu Çaldıran Remix)
Hayat ona güzel	2012	Murat Küçük	Hayat ona güzel
Coffee from Colombia	2013	Harris Hodovic	Coffee from Colombia
Azərbaycan Bayrağı	2013		
Hər Şey Düzələr (feat. Rəhim Rəhimli)	2016	Anar Hüseynov	
S.U.S.	2017	Nestan Sinjikashvili	S.U.S.
Cücələrim	2017	Anar Hüseynov	Duy
Hardasan	2018	Teymur Nəcəfzadə	Hardasan
Yaraşdın mənə (feat. Rauf)	2018	Nicat Məlikov	Yaraşdın mənə
AYA (feat. Rauf)	2018	Nicat Məlikov	AYA
Əlbəttə	2018	Nestan Sinjikashvili	Duy
Duy	2019	Fuad Əlişov	Duy
Jalma (feat. Philipp Kirkorov)	2019	Alisher	Jalma
Ehtiyacım var	2019	Elmar Bayramov	Ehtiyacım var
Jan Azerbaijan (feat. Philipp Kirkorov)	2019	Alisher	Jan Azerbaijan (feat. Philipp Kirkorov)
Jalma (Remake)	2020	Alisher	Jalma (Remake)
Paramparça (acoustic)	2020		Paramparça (acoustic)
Əsgər Marşı	2020	Zakir Quliyev	Əsgər Marşı
Vətən oğlu	2020	Selim Akar	Vətən oğlu
Bu qadın	2021	Selim Akar	Bu qadın
De	2021	Ruslan Ağayev	De
Nirvana	2022	Ali Abbasov	Ya v Nirvane
Погоди, постой (feat. Rəsul Əfəndiyev)	2022	Delee Oruclu	Погоди, постой
Vəfasızlar Unudulmur	2023	Ibrahim Zahidli	Vəfasızlar Unudulmur
Dəyməzmiş	2023	Jaba Axoishvili	Dəyməzmiş
Çalxala	2023	Delee Oruclu	Çalxala
Bilmək Olmaz	2024	Selim Akar	Bilmək Olmaz
Sağ-Salamat	2024	Selim Akar	Sağ-Salamat
Maşallah (feat. Genco Ecer)	2024	Selim Akar	Maşallah
