= List of Turkish films of 2023 =

A list of Turkish films released in 2023.

== January–March ==
Opening		Title	Director	Cast	Genre	Ref.
J A N U A R Y	6	Rafadan Tayfa Galaktik Tayfa	İsmail Fidan	Emine Sergen Kazbek, Şirin Giobbi, Yağmur Sergen	Animation	
J A N U A R Y	6	Sevda Mecburi İstikamet	Çağan Irmak	Kubilay Aka; Selin Şekerci; Elif Ceren Balıkçı	Drama	
J A N U A R Y	6	Düşeş 1 - Mafya Sızıntısı	Bilal Kalyoncu	Ufuk Özkan; Bülent Çolak; Korhan Herduran	Comedy	
J A N U A R Y	6	Evlad-ı Cin	Suat Ergin	Berna Gülen; Serhat Şentürk; Yavuz Gürbüz	Horror	
J A N U A R Y	13	İllegal Hayatlar	Cenk Çelik	Mahsun Karaca; Müjde Uzman; Mehmet Kahraman	Comedy	
J A N U A R Y	13	Tamiri Mümkün	Recep Yılmaz		Documentary	
J A N U A R Y	13	Ammar 3: Cin Kabilesi	Ahmet Yaşar Gümüş	Naz Gedik; İzzet Çivril; Reyhan İlhan	Horror	
J A N U A R Y	13	Bursa Bülbülü	Hakan Algül	Ata Demirer; Cem Gelinoğlu; Özge Özacar	Comedy	
J A N U A R Y	20	Kutsal Damacana 4	Kamil Çetin	Müjde Uzman; Şafak Sezer; Onur Büyüktopçu	Comedy	
J A N U A R Y	20	49	Hakan İnan	İsmail Hacıoğlu; Hande Doğandemir; Kerem Alışık	Drama; Action	
J A N U A R Y	27	Demir Kadın: Neslican	Özgür Bakar	Çağla Irmak; Yurdaer Okur; İlker Aksum	Drama; Biographical	
J A N U A R Y	27	İfrit-i Cin	Ertuğrul Yüreklikul	Burak Ergün; Canan Çalışkan; Ertuğrul Yüreklikul	Horror	
F E B R U A R Y	3	Musallat 3	Özgür Bakar	Kurtuluş Şakirağaoğlu; Pelinsu Çiçeli; İbrahim Aslan	Horror	
F E B R U A R Y	3	Prestij Meselesi	Mahsun Kırmızıgül	Engin Hepileri; Eser Yenenler; Aslıhan Güner	Drama	
F E B R U A R Y	17	Kırmızı Başlıklı Kız ve Bizim Kahramanlar	Erhan Yiğit		Animation	

== See also ==
- 2023 in Turkey
- List of 2023 box office number-one films in Turkey
