= Sevinç =

- Gender: Female

Origin
- Language: Turkish
- Meaning: "Joy", "Happiness", "Glee"

Other names
- Related names: Sevgi, Sevil, Sevim, Sevin

Sevinç is a common last name Turkish given name. In Turkish, "Sevinç" means "joy", "happiness" or "glee".

== People ==
=== Given name ===
- Sevinç Çorlu (born 1990), Turkish footballer
- Sevinç Erbulak (born 1975), Turkish actress

=== Surname ===
- Ayberk Sevinç (born 1988), Turkish volleyball player
- Burak Sevinç (born 1985), Turkish actor
- Dursun Sevinç (born 1972), Turkish weightlifter
- Metin Sevinç (born 1994), Turkish footballer
- Mümtaz Sevinç (born 1952), Turkish actor

== Places ==
- Sevinç, Manavgat, a village in Manavgat district of Antalya Province, Turkey
- Sevinç, Odunpazarı, a mahalle in Odunpazarı district of Kütahya Province, Turkey
