= Esin =

Esin is a Turkish given name and surname. It means "inspiration," "afflatus," or "morning breeze."

Ẹsin is also a Yoruba word meaning "religion".

Notable people with the name include:

- Emel Esin (1912 or 1914 - 1987), Turkish art historian
- Esin Afşar (1936-2011), Turkish singer and stage artist
- Esin Atıl (1937-2020), Turkish-American curator
- Esin Engin (1945–1997), Turkish musician, composer, arranger, and film actor
- Esin Sağdıç (born 1988), Turkish handballer
- Esin Turan (born 1970), Austrian-Turkish painter and sculptor
- Esin Varan (born 1988), Turkish television series actress
