= Nur Sağman =

Turkish diplomat (born 1967)

Turkish Ambassador to Senegal
- Incumbent
- Assumed office 01 February 2023
- Preceded by: Ahmet Kavas

Personal details
- Born: 1967 (age 58–59) Ankara
- Education: University of Ankara
- Profession: Photographer, Diplomat
- Website: nursagman.com

Hatice Nur Sağman is a Turkish diplomat and the incumbent ambassador of Turkey to Senegal. She was the Turkish ambassador to Guinea from 2015 until 2018 and consul general in Odesa, Ukraine from 2013 until 2015.

== Education ==
Nur obtained her bachelor's degree in economics from Ankara University, Faculty of Political Sciences, Department of Economics in 1988.

== Career ==
She started her career at the Turkish Radio-Television (TRT) and worked as an assistant producer for the children's program 'Sesame Street' from 1988 to 1990.

In 1992, She joined the Ministry of Foreign Affairs (Turkey) as a career diplomat.

Sağman have served at various roles in different countries including France, Romania, Estonia and Morocco. She became the Head of the Department of International Organizations between 2010 and 2011, between 2011 and 2013, she was head of the Protocol Department and served as the Consul General in Odesa between 2013 and 2015. She was the Turkish ambassador to Conakry, Guinea from 1 September 2015 to 30 November 2018. She was also interim at Chargé d'Affaires of the Libreville Embassy from August 15, 2019, until resumption of her appointment as the Director General of Bilateral Political Affairs (Africa) at the Ministry of Foreign Affairs Turkey on January 17, 2020, She is currently the incumbent Turkey Ambassador to Dakar, she took over the baton from Ahmet Kavas as of February 1, 2023.

== Personal life ==
Nur has been nicknamed Erdogan's Madame Africa. She was married to Mümtaz Sevinç, a Turkish theater, cinema and TV series actor(now late) for a while.
