= Özacar =

Özacar is a Turkish surname. Notable people with the surname include:

- Ahmet Özacar (1937–2005), Turkish international footballer
- Özge Özacar (born 1995), Turkish actress
