= Tolga Mendi =

Turkish film actor

- Born: March 23, 1993 (age 33); Adana, Turkey
- Citizenship: Turkish
- Education: Çukurova University
- Occupation: Actor
- Years active: 2015-present

Tolga Mendi (born 23 March 1993; Adana, Turkey) is a Turkish actor.

== Life and career ==
Tolga Mendi was born on 23 March 1993 in Adana, Turkey. because he was born into a religious family to enter the field of acting he faced strong opposition from his family After he graduated from İsmail Safa Özler Anatolian High School, he started to study construction engineering at Çukurova University.

Tolga Mendi studied acting 2 terms and started his career with Turkish TV series Acı Aşk (Love, Bitter) and Rüzgarın Kalbi. Mendi became famous in Yeni Gelin (New Bride) and played a lead role as Hazar Bozok with co-star Jessica May in 2017. Currently, Tolga Mendi is playing a lead role in his new Turkish TV series Sol Yanım (My Left Side) as Selim Kutlusay.

== Filmography ==
=== TV series ===
Year	Title	Role	Notes
2015	Acı Aşk	Haydar	
2016	Rüzgarın Kalbi	Cenk	Supporting role
2017–2018	Yeni Gelin	Hazar Bozok	Main role
2020–2021	Sol Yanım	Selim Kutlusay	Main role
2024	Merhamet Meleği	Akhmet	Main role
2026	Asırlık Gece	Osman Karaca	Supporting role
