= Tardu Flordun =

Turkish actor (born 1972)

- Born: 25 May 1972 (age 54); Ankara, Turkey
- Occupation: Actor
- Years active: 1996–present

Tardu Flordun (born 25 May 1972) is a Turkish actor.

== Biography ==
Tardu Flordun was born on 25 May 1972 in Ankara as the son of actor Macit Flordun. He graduated in theatre from Hacettepe University after which he went to work at the Kocaeli City Theatre.

In 1998, he acted in the film Leoparın Kuyruğu with Yetkin Dikinciler. He made his television debut in 2000, with leading role in popular romantic comedy Evdeki Yabancı starring Berna Laçin. He then went on to act in Bir Tatlı Huzur, İki Oda Bir Sinan and Camdan Pabuçlar. In 2005, Flordun played a musician in popular series Davetsiz Misafir where he starred with Pınar Altuğ. After appearing in the series Aşk Oyunu, he acted in the film Bir Varmış Bir Yokmuş with Nurseli İdiz, Ceyda Düvenci ve Gülben Ergen.

In 2006, he began acting in the series Binbir Gece which ran until early 2009. He played the 'Piç Neco' (Neco the bastard) character in the crime drama film Sis ve Gece which was adapted from Ahmet Ümit's acclaimed novel. Flordun appearanced in the film O Kadın released in 2007.

He starred in the period series Son Yaz between 2012 and 2013, alongside Hazal Kaya, Tuğçe Kazaz and Furkan Palalı.

== Selected filmography ==
- Kara Melek (1996)
- Mektup (1997)
- Leoparın Kuyruğu (1998)
- Hepsi Bir Düştü (1999)
- Evdeki Yabancı (2000)
- Bir Tatlı Huzur (2002)
- Efsane (2002)
- İki Oda Bir Sinan (2002)
- Fişgittin Bey (2003)
- Mühürlü Güller (2003)
- Camdan Pabuçlar (2004)
- Davetsiz Misafir (2005)
- Aşk Oyunu (2005)
- Bir Varmış Bir Yokmuş (2005)
- Binbir Gece (2006)
- Sis ve Gece (2006)
- Parmaklıklar Ardında (2007)
- O Kadın (2007)
- Sözün Bittiği Yer (2007)
- Bekle Beni (2010)
- Mükemmel Çift (2010)
- Takım (2011)
- Behzat Ç.: Seni Kalbime Gömdüm (2011)
- Sırat (2011)
- Türkan (2011)
- Tek Başımıza (2011)
- Gizli Saklı (2022)
