= Duy (album) =

EP by Aygun Kazimova
- Released: September 7, 2018
- Genre: Pop
- Label: SS Production
- Producer: Aysel Rəcəbli

Aygun Kazimova chronology
Yenə tək (2008)	Duy (2018)	Crystal Hall (2020)

Singles from Duy
- 1. "S.U.S." Released: August 27, 2017; 2. "Duy" Released: February 22, 2019

Duy is an EP by Azerbaijani singer Aygun Kazimova, released on 7 September 2018 by SS Production. The album was recorded in Georgia in 2018, and most of the tracks were produced by Georgian musician Kakhaber Tsiskaridze. It also contains a remake version of the single "S.U.S." which was released in 2017 and a cover version of the famous children's song called "Cücələrim". A non-remixed version of "Duy" was released in 2019 as a single.

== Track listing ==
No.	Title	Lyrics	Music	Length
1.	"Intro"		Kakhaber Tsiskaridze	2:00
2.	"Ona Söylə"	Azər Şirin	Kakhaber Tsiskaridze	4:09
3.	"Toy Boy"	MC Murad	Kakhaber Tsiskaridze	3:17
4.	"Əlbəttə"	Azər Şirin	Kakhaber Tsiskaridze	3:21
5.	"Duy" (Remix)	MC Murad	David Vendetta	6:11
6.	"Cücələrim"	Kamber Hüseynli	Tevfik Mütellibov	3:21
7.	"S.U.S." (Remake)	Vüqar Əbdülov	Stephane Mgebrishvili	4:06
Total length:				26:54
