= Aygun Kazimova =

Azerbaijani singer (born 1971)

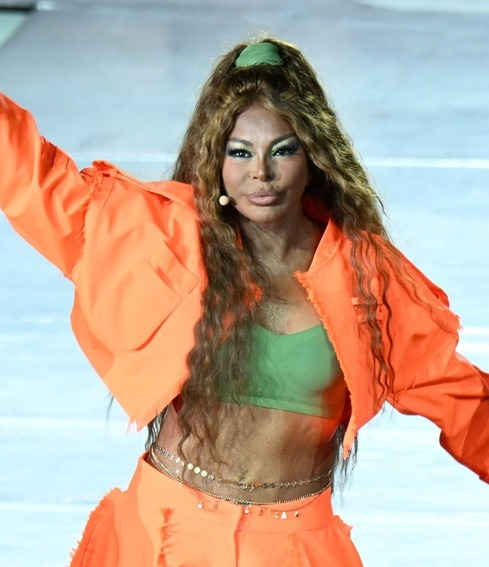
- Kazimova in 2025

Background information
- Born: 26 January 1971 (age 55); Baku, Azerbaijan SSR, USSR
- Genres: Pop; R&B; soul; dance; blues; jazz; electronic; Mugham
- Occupations: Singer-songwriter; actress
- Instrument: Vocals
- Years active: 1986–present
- Labels: BEAT Music; Bakı-Raks; SS production; Böyük Şahinlər; Sabuhi AMD; Dokuz Sekiz Müzik; DMC

Aygun Alasgar gyzy Kazimova (Azerbaijani: Aygün Ələsgər qızı Kazımova; born on 26 January 1971) is an Azerbaijani singer, songwriter, pop musician, and actress in Azerbaijan. Kazimova wrote and sang the anthem of the 2012 FIFA U-17 Women's World Cup. Her duet with Snoop Dogg "Coffee from Colombia" was a number one hit on the Azerbaijani, Turkish, Czech Republic, Colombian, Georgian and Russian charts. Kazimova has recorded ten albums.

== Early life ==
Kazimova is the youngest of four children. After graduating high school, she briefly enrolled in the Maarif Tekhnikum of Arts, which she left in 1986. During this period, she performed with the Gaya youth band.

== Career ==
Kazimova began her professional solo career in 1988 after winning first prize at the Baki Payizi-88 (Baku Autumn-88) music contest. She received an award at the Yurmala music competition in 1989 and also earned distinction at "The Voice of Asia" music contest in Kazakhstan in 1992.

Kazimova released her first album, featuring fourteen tracks, in 1997 called Sevgi Gülləri (Flowers of Love). She was awarded the title of Honored Artist of Azerbaijan in 2001.

In 2005, Kazimova played the title role in the musical Khari Bulbullar directed by Arif Gaziyev, and the role of Sanam in the screen version of the play Meshadi Ibad. She has also hosted several television shows.

In 2013, Kazimova collaborated with Snoop Dogg for the song "Coffee From Columbia", which was released by Dokuz Sekiz Müzik and included remixes by My Digital Enemy and Bimbo Jones.

== Personal life ==
Kazimova married Ibrahim Ibrahimov, in 1989. Their daughter, Ilgara, was born in 1990. The couple divorced in 1991.

In 1994, Kazimova married Rza Guliyev, a nephew of former parliamentary speaker and later opposition figure Rasul Guliyev. The couple separated following Guliyev's arrest in 1996.

From 2001 to 2002, Kazimova was in a relationship with Turkish actor and model Mert Kılıç. She later entered into a relationship with meykhana singer Namig Garachukhurlu, which lasted from 2004 to 2010. The couple confirmed their separation in August 2010.

In September 2014, Kazimova alluded to changes in her private life; follow-up reports highlighted a pendant with the letter "F" and speculation about a new partner. In March 2016, Kazimova confirmed her relationship with Farhad Aliyev, son of energy minister Natig Aliyev. Later that year, Kazimova announced the relationship had ended.

== Discography ==
=== Studio album ===
- Ömrüm – Günüm (1997)
- Ah...! (1998)
- Aygün (2000)
- Sevdim (2001)
- Sevgi gülləri (2003)
- Sevərsənmi? (2005)
- Yenə tək (2008)

=== Compilation albums ===
- Aygün Kazımova, Vol. 1 (2008)
- Aygün Kazımova, Vol. 2 (2008)
- Aygün Kazımova, Vol. 3 (2008)
- Aygün Kazımova, Vol. 4 (2008)
- Sevdi Ürək (2012)
- Ya Devushka Vostochnaya (2013)
- Səni Belə Sevmədilər (2015)
- Azərbaycan Qızıyam (2015)
- Aygün Kazımovanın ifaları (2016)
- By SS Production (2020)
- Remakes (2020)

=== Live albums ===
- Crystal Hall (2020)

=== EPs ===
- Duy (2018)
- Ya v Nirvane (2021)

=== Singles ===
Year	Name
2011	Petrol
2012	Qoy bütün aləm bizdən danışsın
2012	Hayat Ona Güzel
2012	İkinci Sen (feat. Sinan Akçıl)
2012	İkinci Sen (Batu Çaldıran Remix) (feat. Sinan Akçıl)
2012	Gol
2013	Telafisi Yok
2014	Sənə Xəstəyəm
2015	Unutmuşam
2015	Aklım Başıma Geldi
2016	Arama beni
2017	Seni Böyle Sevmediler
2017	S.U.S.
2018	Hardasan
2018	Yakıştın Bana (feat. Rauf)
2018	AYA (feat. Rauf)
2019	Paramparça
2019	Dola Mənə Qolunu (feat. Rəsul Əfəndiyev)
2019	Mən Gəlirəm
2019	Kim Dinler Sizi
2019	Gedək Şəhərdən (feat. Rəsul Əfəndiyev)
2019	Jalma (feat. Philipp Kirkorov)
2019	Ehtiyacım Var
2019	Can Azərbaycan (feat. Philipp Kirkorov)
2020	Bizdən Danışaq (feat. Rauf)
2020	Jalma (Remake) (Solo)
2020	Deli fikirler
2020	İcazəli (feat. Miri Yusif)
2020	Paramparça (acoustic)
2020	Əsgər Marşı
2020	Vətən oğlu
2021	Yarımdı o (feat. Rəsul Əfəndiyev)
2021	Bu qadın
2021	Söylə
2021	Azərbaycan Türkiyə (Remake)
2021	De
2021	Denizin Ortasında
2021	Lya Lya Fa
2021	Азербайджан (Azerbaijan) (feat. Emin)
2022	Saxla Şəkilləri (feat. Rauf)
2022	Ey Mənim Dünyam (2022 Remake)
2022	Погоди, постой (Wait, wait) (feat. Rəsul Əfəndiyev)
2023	Qorxuram
2023	Vəfasızlar Unudulmur
2023	Dəyməzmiş
2023	Çalxala
2023	Parol
2024	Bilmək Olmaz
2024	Sağ-Salamat
2024	Maşallah (feat. Genco Ecer)
2024	Turan Gəlir
2024	S.O.S
2024	1 (feat. Kazım Can)
2024	Can Ol
2025	Etiraf
2025	Əlcək
2025	Üfüq
2025	Abrakadabra
2025	Rəqs
2025	Mərd Adam
2026	Məsafələr feat. Nəsimi Məmmədov
2026	Oxudum feat. YAP10
2026	Karma

== Filmography ==
=== Television ===
Year	Program	Character	Episode	TV
1998–1999	Aygün Bu Gün	Herself	season 2	Sara TV
2000–2001	Bumeranq Şou	Herself	season 1	Lider TV
2001	Gecə yarısı	Herself	season 1	ANS TV
2003	Gələn Var	Herself	season 1	Space TV
2005	Aygün Bu Gün	Herself	season 1	Space TV
	Yeni Ulduz	Herself		ATV
2008–2010	Xeyir Ola	Herself	season 2	ATV
2011	Extreme Azerbaijan	Herself	season 1	Space TV
2015–2016	Ozunu Tanit	Herself	season 1	ATV

=== Film ===
Title	Year	Role	Notes	Ref.
Yarımştat	1996	Aygün		
Yaşıl eynəkli adam 2	1999	Aygün		
Nekroloq	2001	Aygün		
Qış nağılı	2002	Aygün		
Tam məxfi	2004	Aygün		
Xarı Bülbüllər	2005	Xurşudbanu Natəvan		
Məşədi İbad 94	2005	Sənəm		
Adam Ol	2006	Aygün		
3 Bacı	2013–2014	Aygün	soundtrack	

== Awards ==
Aygun Kazimova awards and nominations
Awards and nominations
Award	Wins	Nominations
Big Apple Music Awards	–	2
Daf Bama Music Awards	1	4
Kral TV Awards	–	2
Altın Kelebek	1	2

Totals (Note: Certain award groups do not simply award one winner. They acknowledge several different recipients, have runners-up, and have third place. Since this is a specific recognition and is different from losing an award, runner-up mentions are considered wins in this award tally. For simplification and to avoid errors, each award in this list has been presumed to have had a prior nomination.)
- Wins: 2
- Nominations: 9

=== Big Apple Music Awards ===
The "Big Apple Music Awards" is an annual American awards show.

Year	Nominated work	Award	Result	Ref
2015	Aygun Kazimova	Best Azerbaijani Female Artist	Nominated	
2015	Aygun Kazimova	Best Caucasian Female Artist	Nominated	

=== Daf Bama Music Awards ===
The "Daf Bama Music Awards "is an annual German awards show.

Year	Nominated work	Award	Result	Ref
2015	Aygun Kazimova	Best Azerbaijani Female Artist	Nominated	
2016	Aygun Kazimova	Best Azerbaijani Female Artist	Won	
2017	Aygun Kazimova	BAMA People's Choice Award	Nominated	
2018	Aygun Kazimova	Best Azerbaijani Female Artist	Nominated	

=== Kral Music Awards ===
Year	Nominated work	Award	Result	Reference
2012	Hayat Ona Güzel	Song of the Year	Nominated	
2012	Hayat Ona Güzel	Best Female Artist	Nominated	

=== Golden Butterfly Awards ===
Year	Nominated work	Award	Result	Ref
2017	Aygun Kazimova	Best Azerbaijani Female Artist	Nominated	
2018	Aygun Kazimova	Best Azerbaijani Female Artist	Won	
