= Ya v Nirvane =

EP by Aygün Kazımova
- Released: 17 December 2021
- Recorded: 2018–2021
- Genre: Pop
- Length: 22:12
- Language: Russian
- Label: Beat Music
- Producer: Maxim Gredin; Vladimir Stukov; Aleko Berdzenishvili; Alisher; Alexander Konovalov; Rustam Rzayev

Aygün Kazımova chronology
Remakes (2020)	Ya v Nirvane (2021)

Singles from Ya v Nirvane
- 1. "Pust" Released: 10 August 2018; 2. "Dzhan Azrbaydzhan" Released: 31 December 2019; 3. "Azrbaydzhan" Released: 9 November 2021

Ya v Nirvane (Russian: Я в Нирване; transl. I’m in Nirvana) is an EP by Azerbaijani singer Aygün Kazımova released on 17 December 2021 by Beat Music. For Kazimova, it was the first completely Russian-language album, and it is also the first album in Azerbaijan with Dolby Atmos sound.

According to Kazımova, the dream of a Russian-language album was born 20 years ago. Not so long ago, the singer resumed negotiations with Russian authors. An international team of Azerbaijani musicians, Russian and Georgian authors worked on the singer's new album; some tracks were recorded and arranged abroad. Alisher was also involved in the work on "Dzhan Azrbaydzhan", who gained wide fame by collaborating with the prima donna of the Russian stage Alla Pugacheva.

The album features six tracks, three of which have never been heard before, these are the songs "Nirvana", "Tarantino" and "Oderzhima"; the album also features duets with Russian singers Philip Kirkorov and Emin Agalarov, and, among other things, a Russian version of the superhit "S.U.S.", called "Pust".

== Track listing ==
No.	Title	Writer(s)	Producer(s)	Length
1.	"Nirvana"	Maxim Gredin; Vladimir Stukov	Vladimir Stukov	3:06
2.	"Tarantino"	Maxim Gredin; Vladimir Stukov	Maxim Gredin; Vladimir Stukov	3:37
3.	"Oderzhima"	Maxim Gredin; Vladimir Stukov	Maxim Gredin; Vladimir Stukov	3:33
4.	"Pust"	Stephane Mgebrishvili; Evgenya Trubacheva; Aleko Berdzenishvili	Aleko Berdzenishvili	3:53
5.	"Dzhan Azrbaydzhan" (feat. Philipp Kirkorov)	Oleg Vladi; Alisher	Alisher	3:46
6.	"Azrbaydzhan" (feat. Emin)	Alexander Konovalov; Brandon Stone	Alexander Konovalov; Rustam Rzayev	4:15
Total length:				22:12
