= Ahmet Kavas =

Turkish diplomat (born 1964)

Turkish Ambassador to Senegal
- In office 1 June 2020 – 21 February 2023
- Preceded by: Nihat Civaner
- Succeeded by: Nur Sağman

Turkish Ambassador to Chad
- In office 3 January 2013 – 8 January 2015
- Succeeded by: Serdar Cengiz

Personal details
- Born: 1964 (age 61–62) Vezirköprü
- Education: University of Ankara; Paris Diderot University
- Profession: Diplomat, Author, Scholar
- Awards: The Senegalese National Order of the Lion

Ahmet Kavas (born 1964 in Vezirköprü, Samsun) is a Turkish diplomat, scholar and author. He is Turkey's inaugural ambassador to N'Djamena, Chad and a former Turkish ambassador to Senegal. He is also a columnist for Daily Sabah and a writer for Istanbul's official economy news portal, Istanbul Ticaret Gazetesi.

== Education ==
Kavas completed his high school education in Amasya at Merzifon Imam-Hatip High School, He finished in 1982 and obtained his first degree from the Faculty of Theology, Ankara University in 1987. In 1988, He won a Turkish Religious Foundation's (Turkish: Türkiye Diyanet Vakfı) sponsored scholarship for his masters and doctorate degrees in France. He completed and obtained his master's degree on Islam and Muslim Societies in Africa in 1991, from the department of geography, history and social sciences, Paris Diderot University.

He received his doctorate degree in 1996 and became a professor in 2008.

== Career ==
First appointed to a diplomatic role in December 2012 as published in Turkey's official gazette, He became Turkey's inaugural Ambassador to Chad between January 2013 and January 2015, Kavas had upon completion of his doctorate degree remained in the academic and research field. He started his career in Istanbul as a researcher from July 1996 to February 2006 at the Istanbul Center for Islamic Studies. In 2006, He became a lecturer at the Istanbul University's Faculty of Theology and simultaneously served as an advisor to the Turkish Prime Ministry on Africa from 2008 till 2011 on both roles.

Kavas returned to Staff duties at Istanbul Medeniyet University after his service in N'Djamena, and was appointed as Deputy Dean of the Faculty of Political Sciences in 2015. He also served as the Dean, Faculty of Political Sciences.

Kavas was reappointed as ambassador to the Turkish embassy in Dakar in April 2020, He succeeded Ambassador Nihat Civaner. He remained in office until 2023 following the appointment of Ambassador Nur Sağman.

== Publications ==
Kavas authored several books including Geçmişten Günümüze Afrika (English: Africa from Past to Present) published by Bookstore, Istanbul in 2005; Osmanlı-Afrika İlişkileri (English: Ottoman-African Relations) published in three editions by Bookstore, Istanbul in 2011, 2013 and 2015; Les Les Relations Turco - Tchadiennes (La Politique ottomane en Afrique centrale) (in French) published by TİKA, İstanbul in 2014 and Fizan Sancağı published by Alelmas, Yalova in 2018.

Some other works he authored include:

- Osmanlı'dan Günümüze Afrika Bibliyografyası / Africa Bibliographie de l'Afrigue - Bibliography of Africa from the Ottomans to the Present / Africa Bibliographie de l'Afrigue
- İki Din Arasında Fransa - France Between Two Religions
- Osmanlı- Afrika İlişkileri - Ottoman-African Relations
- Sahra Altı Afrika & Sub Saharan Africa - Sub-Saharan Africa & Sub Saharan Africa
- Uluslararası Siyasetin Odağındaki Kıta Afrika - African Continent at the Focus of International Politics
- Osmanlı’nın Merkezi Afrika’ya Açılan Kapısı Fizan Sancağı - Ottoman' Sanjak of Fezzan, the Gate of Central Africa
- Afrika'nın Önder Şahsiyetleri - Leading Personalities of Africa
- L'enseignement Islamique en Afrique Francophone les Medersas de la Republique du Mali (in French)

== Personal life ==
Kavas is married, He is a father to three children, speaks English, French and Arabic.
