= Sevin (given name) =

Origin
- Language: Turkish
- Meaning: "Love!" or "Rejoice!"

Other names
- Related names: Sevil, Sevim, Sevinç, Sevgi

Sevin is a common feminine Turkish given name. In Turkish, "Sevin" means "Love!" and/or "Rejoice!".

Sevin is also a Kurdish feminine name, derived from the Kurdish word Sev which means apple.

== People ==
- Sevin Beg Khanzada (c. 1360–1411), Turco-Mongol princess
- Sevin Okyay (born 1942), Turkish literary critic, journalist, author, regular columnist and a prolific translator.
- Fadik Sevin Atasoy, Turkish actor who received Best Supporting Actress in 42nd Antalya Golden Orange Film Festival (See Turkish Wikipedia article)
