= Sevgi =

- Gender: Female

Origin
- Language: Turkish
- Meaning: Love

Other names
- Related names: Sevil, Sevim, Sevin, Sevinç

Sevgi is a common feminine Turkish given name. In Turkish, "Sevgi" means "Love".

== People ==
=== Given name ===
- Emine Sevgi Özdamar (born 1946), Turkish-German actress and author
- Sevgi Çağal (born 1957), Turkish painter and sculptor
- Sevgi Çınar (born 1994), Turkish footballer
- Sevgi Gönül (1938–2003), a member of the Koç family
- Sevgi Sabancı (born 1963), Turkish businesswoman
- Sevgi Salmanlı (born 1993), Turkish women's footballer
- Sevgi Uzun (born 1997), Turkish basketball player
- Sevgi Yorulmaz (born 1982), Turkish para archer

== See also ==
- Şarkım Sevgi Üstüne, Turkish entry for the Eurovision Song Contest 1987
