= Sevim =

- Gender: Female

Origin
- Language: Turkish
- Meaning: "Charm", "Appeal",

Other names
- Related names: Sevgi, Sevil, Sevin, Sevinç

Sevim is a common feminine Turkish given name. In Turkish, "Sevim" means my love, charm and/or appeal.

== People ==
=== Given name ===
- Sevim Burak (1931–1983), Turkish author
- Sevim Dağdelen (born 1975), German politician of Turkish origin and a member of the Left Party (German: die Linkspartei)
- Sevim Demircan (born 2000), Turkish para-athlete
- Sevim Tanürek (1944–1998), Turkish classical music singer
- Sevim Tekeli (1924–2019), Turkish historian of science
