= Sevil =

- Gender: Female

Origin
- Languages: Turkish, Azerbaijani
- Meaning: "be loved"

Other names
- Related names: Sevgi, Sevim, Sevin, Sevinç

Sevil is a common female Turkish and Azerbaijani given name. "Sevil" derives from "sev". In Turkish, "sev(mek)" means "to love" and "Sevil" means the "be loved".

In contexts in which Spanish terms are anglicized, "Sevil" can be an anglicization of "Seville", the city of Sevilla (as in "Sevil plate", silver money from Sevilla).

== People ==
- Sevil Atasoy (born 1949), a Turkish forensic scientist and immediate past president of the UN International Narcotics Control Board
- Sevil Hajiyeva (1968-2000), Azerbaijani singer
- Sevil Sabancı (born 1973), a Turkish businesswoman who is a member of the Sabancı family in third generation
- Sevil Shhaideh (born 1964), Romanian politician

== Works ==
- Sevil, a 1928 by Azerbaijani playwright Jafar Jabbarly
- Sevil, a 1929 film by Alexander Bek-Nazarov, based on the play
- Sevil, a 1953 opera by Azerbaijani composer Fikret Amirov
- Sevil, a 1970 opera film by Vladimir Gorikker

== Fictional characters ==
- Sevil, one of the two protagonists of Merry-Go-Round
