= Şefkat Tepe =

Turkish television series

- Also known as: The Hill of Compassion
- Genre: Action, military, drama and crime
- Starring: Mert Kılıç, Aslıhan Güner, Dilara Büyükbayraktar and Mehmet Korhan Fırat, ali rasulzadeh
- Country of origin: Turkiye
- Original language: Turkish

Original release
- Network: Samanyolu
- Release: June 10, 2010 – 2014

Şefkat Tepe was a Turkish action, military, drama and crime series. The series was set in 1997.

It aired from 2010 to 2014, then continued for a short time as “Sungurlar” which was investigated for links with Fethullah Gülen and ended in 2014. The primary cast included Mert Kılıç, Aslıhan Güner, Dilara Büyükbayraktar and Mehmet Korhan Fırat. It was controversial and popular.

Some say it portrayed Kurds in Turkey badly. One 2015 academic study said that “In such TV series the armed Kurdish groups and their supporters are portrayed as uncivilised, rural and associated with brutal traits such as forced marriages and honour killings. Although in reality such things happen across the country regardless of ethnicity, some TV series are misleadingly creating an understanding that only associates such events with the Kurds.”
