= Aygün Kazımova, Vol. 4 =

Studio album by Aygun Kazimova
- Released: February 25, 2008
- Genre: Pop
- Length: 71:31
- Label: Süper Müzik Yapım

Aygun Kazimova chronology
Aygün Kazımova, Vol. 3 (2008)	Aygün Kazımova, Vol. 4 (2008)	Coffee from Colombia (2014)

Aygün Kazımova, Vol. 4 studio album by Azerbaijani singer Aygun Kazimova, released on February 25, 2008, by Süper Müzik Yapım.

== Track listing ==
No.	Title	Length
1.	"Matros"	4:14
2.	"Heyatımla Oynama"	4:04
3.	"Mehebbet Dıyarı"	4:46
4.	"Danma"	2:44
5.	"Mehebbet Ucbucaqı"	3:53
6.	"Ozumu Aldadıram"	4:54
7.	"Men Sevırem Sehere Qeder"	6:06
8.	"Eshqın Dushgunu"	2:57
9.	"Avarasan"	3:05
10.	"Bir Payız Gecesi"	3:44
11.	"Cennet Baqı"	3:40
12.	"Bır Daha"	3:53
13.	"Heyatımla Oynama, Pt. 2"	4:05
14.	"Mavı Royamsan"	3:35
15.	"Qayıt Gel"	6:27
16.	"Yeni Versiya"	3:53
17.	"Tenha Qadın"	4:20
18.	"Sensızlıyım"	4:31
Total length:		71:31
