= Pınar Altuğ =

Turkish actress

- Born: 2 September 1974 (age 51); Istanbul, Turkey
- Occupation(s): Actress, TV Host, Model
- Years active: 1995–present
- Spouses: Umut Elçioğlu (m. 2000; div. 2003) Yağmur Atacan (m. 2008)
- Children: 1

Pınar Altuğ Atacan (born 2 September 1974) is a Turkish actress, tv host, former model and beauty pageant titleholder. She is best known for family comedy "Çocuklar Duymasın" (2002-2019) which one of the longest Turkish series and hit romantic comedy series "Davetsiz Misafir" which played two roles.

== Education ==
Altuğ studied at Saint-Benoît French High School. She started modeling while in high school. Her father died when she was 17 years old. Altuğ, who was elected Miss Turkey 1994, stopped her education at Istanbul University School of Political Sciences, Department of Business Administration in 1997. She eventually pursued a degree in communication studies.

== Career ==
She started her career in television in 1995. Between 1995 and 1998, she worked as a presenter on various news-magazine programs. In 1999, she started presenting the food program Pınar'ın Yemek Zevki, after which she retired from modelling. In 2003, she released her first cookbook, titled Pınar'ın Mutfağından. From 2004 to 2006, she presented the Türkiye'nin Yıldızları contest.

In 2000, she was cast in the Kurt Kapanı TV series. She continued her career as an actress with roles in popular series Çocuklar Duymasın, Omuz Omuza, Davetsiz Misafir and İlk Aşkım. She played two roles in "Davetsiz Misafir". In 2010, she began taking part in the new season of comedy series Çocuklar Duymasın, for which she eventually a Golden Butterfly Award for Best Comedy Actress in 2018.

With Emre Kınay, she performed for twice in play "Mutlu Aile Tablosu" which won Afife Jale Best Comedy Play Award.

== Personal life ==
In 2000, she married Umut Elçioğlu but divorced after a few years. In 2008, she married actor Yağmur Atacan. Their daughter, named Su, was born in January 2009.

== Filmography ==
=== Television ===
Television
Year	Title	Role	Notes
2000	Kurt Kapanı	Serap Arma	Leading role
2002	Reyting Hamdi	Pınar	Guest appearance
2004	Omuz Omuza	Nisan Öz	Leading role
2005	Davetsiz Misafir	Defne/Şirin	Leading role
2006	İlk Aşkım	Lale Gürsoy	Leading role
2006	Deli Dolu	Selin	Leading role
2009	Aile Reisi	Bahar Poyraz	Leading role
2002–2019	Çocuklar Duymasın	Meltem	Leading role

=== Film ===
Film
Year	Title	Role	Notes
2008	Asteriks Olimpiyat Oyunları'nda	Irena	Voice-over
2016	Pamuk Prens	Pınar Altuğ	Guest appearance
2025	Köstebekgiller: Ata Tohumu		Leading role

=== TV programs ===
Program
Year	Title
2004	Türkiye'nin Yıldızları
2007	Sizi Böyle Alalım
2007	Bir Dilek Tut
2007	Mucizeler Gecesi
2008	Pınarın Günlüğü
2009–2010	Bir Şarkısın Sen
2012	Bir Şarkısın Sen
2017	Sizi Böyle Alalım
2018	Sizi Böyle Alalım Ramadan Special

== Awards and nominations ==
Year	Award	Category	Work	Result
2018	45th Golden Butterfly Awards	Best Comedy Actress	Çocuklar Duymasın	Won
