= Sevinç, Odunpazarı =

Settlement in Odunpazarı district, Eskişehir province, Turkey

Sevinç
- Neighbourhood
- Location in Turkey Sevinç (Turkey Central Anatolia)
- Coordinates: 39°46′48″N 30°41′20″E
- Country: Turkey
- Province: Eskişehir
- District: Odunpazarı
- Population (2022): 1,197
- Time zone: UTC+3 (TRT)

Sevinç is a mahalle of the municipality and district of Odunpazarı, Eskişehir Province, Turkey. As of 2022, its population is 1,197.

Sevinç is located about 15 km east of Eskişehir, on the south side of the Porsuk Çayı. There is an archaeological tell immediately above the village, and the remains of two column capitals that probably date from the early Byzantine period have been found in Sevinç.
