= Aygün Kazımova, Vol. 2 =

Studio album by Aygun Kazimova
- Released: February 25, 2008
- Genre: Pop
- Length: 74:19
- Label: Süper Müzik Yapım

Aygun Kazimova chronology
Aygün Kazımova, Vol. 1 (2008)	Aygün Kazımova, Vol. 2 (2008)	Aygün Kazımova, Vol. 3 (2008)

Aygün Kazımova, Vol. 2 is a studio album by Azerbaijani singer-songwriter-diva Aygun Kazimova, released on February 25, 2008, by Süper Müzik Yapım.

== Track listing ==
No.	Title	Length
1.	"Senden Bashqa"	4:35
2.	"Kıshıler"	3:21
3.	"Mix 1"	3:30
4.	"Bılmedım"	3:31
5.	"Mix 2"	4:42
6.	"Bır Gun"	5:35
7.	"Incı"	5:19
8.	"Son Soz"	7:05
9.	"Men Aygunem"	4:32
10.	"Reyhan"	3:39
11.	"Seni Dushundukce"	4:17
12.	"Bade Ne Bade"	3:45
13.	"Gel Ey Seher"	4:15
14.	"Doze Bilmirem"	4:37
15.	"Sigara"	4:35
16.	"Kecmish Olan"	4:33
17.	"Eceb Yarashiriq"	5:08
Total length:		76:59
