= Esin Varan =

Turkish Actress

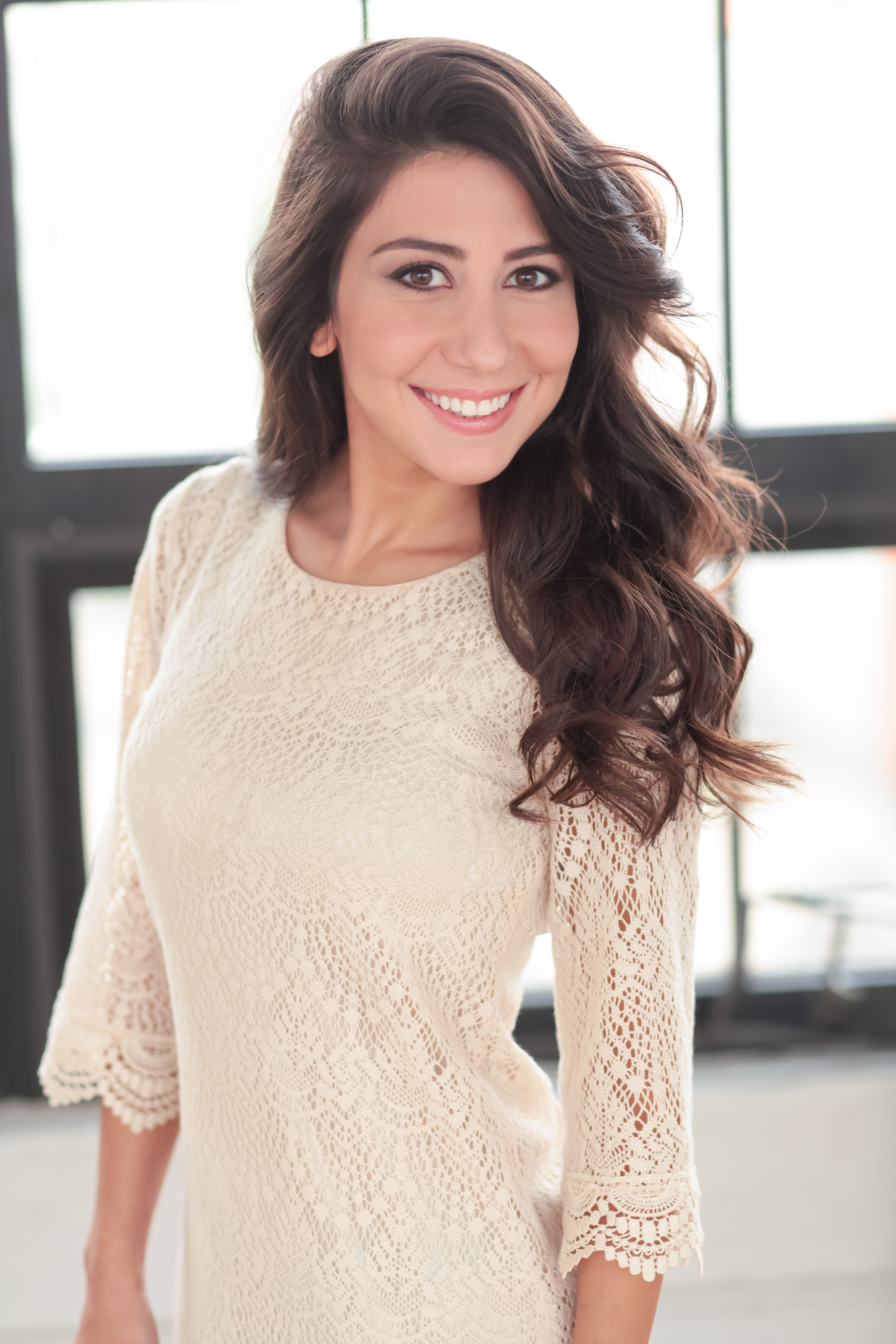
- Varan in 2013
- Born: Artvin, Turkey
- Occupations: Actress, model, writer
- Years active: 2010–present

Esin Varan is an American actress and writer who has worked in film & television and on stage.

== Acting career ==
Varan started acting at a very early age. She pursued her acting career while studying International Relations and Political Science at Marmara University, where she took a bachelor's degree. After establishing her acting career in Europe, she moved to New York City to study acting. She graduated from American Academy of Dramatic Arts and completed an exclusive year of advanced acting in the Academy Company. She acted in many films, TV Shows and Commercials.

== Filmography ==
Film
Year	Film	Role
2010	This is a Robbery	Gulperi
2011	Professor Kemal	Beril
2014	The Money or the Man	Christina Davis
2014	My Best Friend's Diary	Chloe
2014	The Other Side of love	Emily
2014	Babylon Fields	Actress
2015	The Last Apartment	Monica
2015	Behind Every Door	Naomi
2015	Lussuria	Antonella
2015	Take it Back	Kristina
2016	Sisterhood	Aisha
2016	Bats	Ms. Smith
2017	Fairytale of New York	Deniz
2017	Americano	Antonia Talm
2018	Pretenders	Lisa
2018	Branded	Erika Monroe
2018	Existence	Christine
2019	Disquiet	Sophie
2019	After The Veil	Adelina
