= Ümit Erdim =

Turkish actor

- Born: 15 June 1985 (age 40); Kocaeli, Turkey
- Occupation: Actor
- Years active: 1998–present
- Spouse: Seda Çınar (m. 2017; div. 2024)
- Children: 2

Ümit Erdim (born 15 June 1985) is a Turkish actor, TV Presenter and pilot.

== Life and career ==
Erdim is a graduate of İzmit Atılım Anatolian High School. Between 1998–2003, he worked as an actors in the youth unit of Kocaeli Metropolitan Municipal City Theatre. There he met fellow actor Caner Özyurtlu with whom he moved to Istanbul and founded an agency in Kadıköy. Soon he was offered role in different television series. He first appeared as a guest in a few episodes of Böyle mi Olacaktı and Gönül.

He played leading role in series such as hit teen series Hayat Bilgisi and popular fantasy child series Selena. He played in spin off series "Doksanlar" of hit period comedy Seksenler. He also made his cinematic debut in 2015 with a role in Can Tertip.

In January 2015, he joined the judging panel of the third season of Benzemez Kimse Sana.

== Filmography ==
=== TV series ===
- Böyle mi Olacaktı? (guest appearance) 2002
- Hayat Bilgisi (Var Mısın Arif) Kanal D / Show TV 2003–2006
- Gönül (Cemali) Kanal D 2006
- Selena (Zülfikar Yıldız) atv 2006–2009
- Adanalı (guest appearance) atv 2008–2009
- Teyzanne (Damperli) Star TV 2009
- Doksanlar atv 2013
- Kapanmadan Kazan (guest appearance) atv 2013
- Şefim (guest appearance) atv 2013
- Doksanlar atv 2013
- Şampiyon 2019–

=== Film ===
- Can Tertip - 2015 (Şakir Tahta)
- Kan Kardeşler - 2016 (Şakir)
- Bücür - 2018
- Kim Daha Mutlu - 2019

=== TV programs ===
- Pasaport
- Adam Asmaca
- Mami
- Benzemez Kimse Sana (Judge) Star TV 2012 / 2015
