= Merve Sevi =

Turkish actress (born 1987)

- Born: 24 July 1987 (age 38); Istanbul, Turkey
- Occupation: Actress
- Years active: 2004–present

Merve Sevi (born 24 July 1987) is a Turkish actress, mostly known for her roles in romantic comedy Omuz Omuza, youth series Hayat Bilgisi and most recently in Yalanci Yarim, a popular TV show where she rose to nationwide fame. She joined in hit medical series "Doktorlar".

== Biography ==
Her family is of Laz descent from Arhavi. She was born in Istanbul and after completing high school, she chose to pursue a career in acting and enrolled in the Theater Studies program in Yeditepe University. However, she had to take a break from her education in 2006 when she joined the cast of Yalancı Yarim as Naz, the rich and spoiled girl who eventually falls in love with her driver. She was a prominent member of the show until the sudden death of co-star Barış Akarsu in a traffic accident in July 2007. In 2011, she started acting on the TV series İzmir Çetesi. This led to the cancellation of the show, leading Sevi to land the part in Dağlar Delisi, an upcoming show in the fall season.

== Filmography ==
=== TV series ===
- Hayat Mucizelere Gebe (2015)
- Canımın İçi (2012)
- Yalancı Bahar (2011)
- İzmir Çetesi (2011)
- İhanet (2010)
- Doktorlar (2008-2009)
- Hayat Güzeldir (2008)
- Dağlar Delisi (2007)
- Yalancı Yarim (2006)
- Hayat Bilgisi (2004-2005)
- Omuz Omuza (2004)

=== Movies ===
- Oyun Kısa Film (2009)
- Rina (2010)
- Gülcemal (2014)
- Selam 2 Bahara Yolculuk (2015)
- Şeytanın Çocukları El Ebyaz (2016)
- Cesedin ölümü (2019)
- Me nokta ALI (2021)
- Anemizi saklerken (2021)
- Benim kocam yapmaz (2022)

=== Theater plays ===
- Öldüm Öldüm Dirildim (2012)
- Bebek Tüpe Sıkışmış Umutlar (2013)
- Haftasonunun Son Günü (2013)
- Bir Öyle Bir Böyle (2014)
- Akla Ziyan İşler (2014)
- Sevgili Karım (2015)
- Sorma Söylemem (2015)
- Fareler ve İnsanlar (2016)
