= Burak Sevinç =

Turkish actor and musician

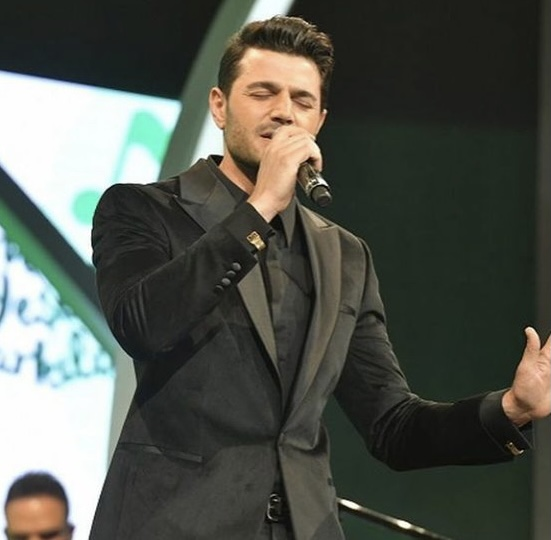
- Sevinç performing at an event for TEMA in 2019
- Born: 27 October 1985 (age 40); Zonguldak, Turkey
- Education: Yıldız Technical University (left)
- Occupations: Actor, musician
- Years active: 2011–present
- Spouse: Şirin Kılavuz (m. 2015; div. 2021)
- Relatives: Ayberk Sevinç (brother)

Burak Sevinç (born 27 October 1985) is a Turkish actor and musician.

== Early life ==
Burak Sevinç was born on 27 October 1985 in Zonguldak. He is the son of oud player Özcan Sevinç.

After finishing his primary, secondary and high school education in Zonguldak, Sevinç moved to Istanbul and enrolled in Yıldız Technical University's School of Arts and Designing, studying music and performing arts, but left his studies unfinished in the second year to develop his career as a musician. In an interview, he described his educational background "Everywhere it says I graduated from Yıldız Technical University, but I dropped out of YTU in my second year. I was studying in the Department of Music Ensembles at the School of Arts and Designing."

Sevinç, who is interested in music as well as acting, started taking lessons on the qanun instrument at the Turkish Classical Music Association at the age of 11 with the guidance of his father. After 6 months of education, he started playing musical instruments such as violin, oud, qanun and guitar, and started performing at the Zonguldak Art Music Association in 1997. He also worked for a while as a professional musician in the Enbe Orchestra conducted by Behzat Gerçeker. Sevinç, who is also interested in carpentry besides acting and musicianship, said in an interview, "I have been very interested in carpentry for years, I love dealing with wood. Many items in my house are made by me. It's a form of therapy for me. I can go on for hours without thinking about anything." Sevinç, who has also been interested in diving since an early age, took diving training for 5 years. He has been diving professionally for more than 7 years after his long training. He is also interested in sports such as basketball, volleyball and handball.

== Career ==
=== 2011–16: Early years ===
Sevinç made his acting debut in 2011 with his role as Alpay in the TV series Babam İçin, directed by Ahmet Katıksız. He then portrayed the character of Yusuf in the 2012 TV series Yol Ayrımı. He subsequently had minor roles in the series Merhaba Hayat (2013) and Yalan Dünya (2013). In the same year he was cast in a recurring role in the series Ben Onu Çok Sevdim (2013). He acted alongside Mehmet Aslantuğ, İdil Fırat and Birce Akalay, playing the role of driver Hasan. After acting in the series for 15 episodes, he appeared in the series Kurtlar Vadisi Pusu (2013) as Polat Alemdar's bodyguard Timur Emir. In an interview, Sevinç stated that he lost 16 kilos in 1 year for his role and added, "I learned the martial arts called Wing Chun for the role. Because Necati Şaşmaz asked me to do it. It's a defensive form of martial arts, but a very tough one. You learn how to attack your opponent in the shortest way. I got my fitness through it. By removing sugar from my life, I lost 16 kilos in a year." After acting in the series for 3 seasons, he left the cast following the death of his character. He then got roles in the series Evli ve Öfkeli (2015) and Altınsoylar (2016), and in the movie Dönerse Senindir (2016).

=== 2017–present: Söz, Leke, Kırmızı Oda and other projects ===
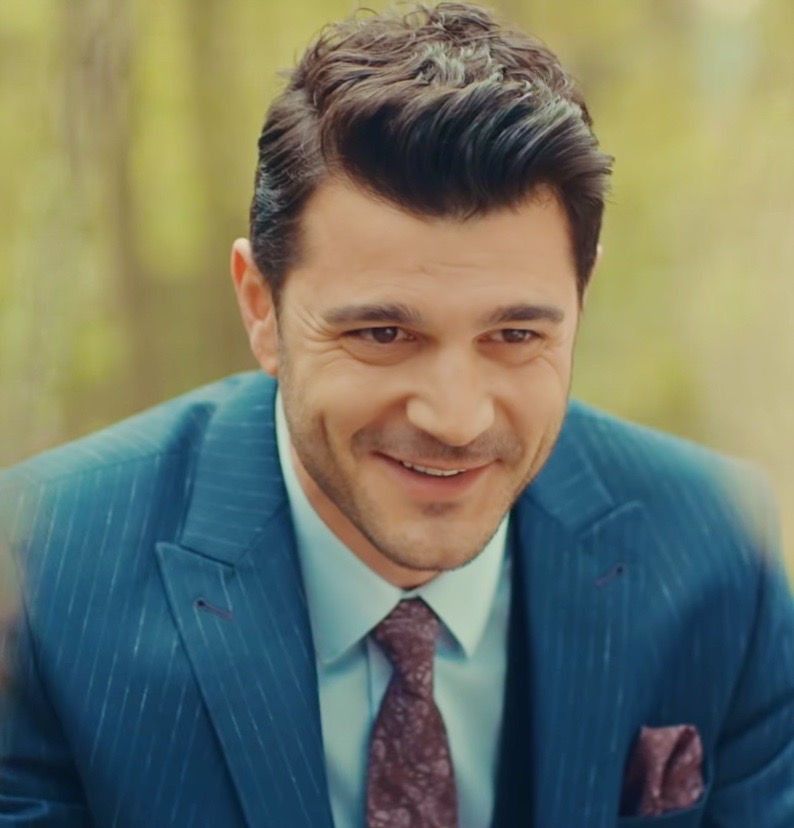
Sevinç as Cem Yenilmez in a scene from Leke (2019)

Between 2017 and 2019, Sevinç had his breakthrough with his role as Fethi Kulaksız in the TV series Söz. After being cast in the role of a soldier in the series, Sevinç received military training in a tough camp for two weeks by retired special forces members along with his co-stars during the preparation process. He received training on uniform discipline, saluting, guarding procedures, addressing style, carrying and using weapons, as well as close protection-combat training. Sevinç left the series at the end of the third season with the death of his character. He then landed his first leading role opposite Melis Sezen in the series Leke, which premiered in April 2019. The series concluded with 9 episodes, in which he portrayed the character of Cem Yenilmez. In 2020, he acted alongside Gökçe Bahadır in the musical İzmir'in Kızları, which marked his first professional experience on stage. The musical premiered on 24 January 2020. Sevinç received great acclaim for his acting and vocal performance in the musical. On 11 May 2020, the musical was stopped due to the worldwide COVID-19 pandemic and the restrictive measures taken in Turkey.

He played the role of Gökhan Hancıoğlu in the romantic comedy movie Nasipse Olur, in which he shared the leading role with Algı Eke and Nur Sürer. It premiered on 14 February 2020. In the same year, he was cast in a leading role in TV8's series Kırmızı Oda, which is an adaptation of Gülseren Budayıcıoğlu's novel Madalyonun İçi. He starred alongside Binnur Kaya, Tülin Özen and Meriç Aral and had the role of Doctor Deniz Saner. After taking part in the series for 30 episodes, he left it at his own will.

In 2021, Sevinç prepared to portray the Turkish poet Hacı Bayram-ı Veli in the historical drama Series Aşkın Yolculuğu: Hacı Bayram Veli, which is based on the poet's life.

== Personal life ==
On 1 August 2015, at Zonguldak Kapuz Beach, he married Şirin Kılavuz, an Istanbul City Theatre actress and yoga instructor. The couple divorced in May 2021. He is currently dating co-star Sena Çakir from Aşkın Yolculuğu: Hacı Bayram-ı Veli and revealed in 2025-2026 that they had been dating for four years.

Burak Sevinç had an accident while driving under the influence of alcohol in April 2020. After it was determined that his blood alcohol content was 1.28 per mille, proceedings were initiated against him. The Prosecutor's Office issued an indictment demanding up to 6 years in prison within the scope of the crime of 'endangering traffic safety'. Sevinç, who appeared before the judge at the Istanbul Courthouse, admitted that he had drunk alcohol and drove a vehicle on the day of the incident. The court sentenced Sevinç to 2 months and 15 days in prison on the grounds of the crime report and the accused's admission of guilt.

== Philanthropy ==
Burak Sevinç has taken part in many social projects. In 2018, he took part in the project "Bir Notaya da Sen Bas" (You Can Reach a Note Too) initiated by Zuhal Music and Cancer-Free Life Association. Within the scope of the project, rhythm workshops were organized for all age groups. Sevinç gave rhythm lessons to children with cancer in music schools and at the same time, along with many famous individuals, performed Bülent Ortaçgil's song "Benimle Oynar mısın?". All proceeds from the project were donated to the Cancer Free Life Association for the treatment of children with cancer.

In January 2020, he took part in the project called "Karanlığı Arala/Bir Şey Söyleyin" (Break the Darkness/Say Something), which was implemented by the World Human Relief Association. Sevinç starred with actors such as Şevval Sam, Belçim Bilgin and Engin Altan Düzyatan in the short film Karanlığı Arala, which was prepared to prevent and raise awareness about child abuse, which is increasing day by day in Turkey. In addition, in order for children to receive education about the nature, he voluntarily performed many times in the special broadcast "Umut Yeşerten Şarkılar" organized by the TEMA Foundation on NTV in 2016, 2018 and 2019.

== Filmography ==
Film
Year	Title	Role	Notes
2016	Dönerse Senindir	Arda Ardan	Supporting role
2017	Mahalle	Cafer	Supporting role
2020	Nasipse Olur	Gökhan Hancıoğlu	Leading role
2022	Soygun Oyunu: Büyük Vurgun	Ali Toprak	Leading role
2023	Murat Göğebakan: Kalbim Yaralı	Murat Göğebakan	Leading role
2023	Roza	Ferdi	Leading role
2024	Hatıran Yeter	Adem	Leading role
2024	Beyaz Eşya	Nihat	Leading role
TV series
Year	Title	Role	Notes
2011	Babam İçin	Alpay	Supporting role
2012	Yol Ayrımı	Yusuf	Supporting role
2013	Merhaba Hayat	Onur	Guest appearance
2013	Yalan Dünya	-	Guest appearance
2013	Ben Onu Çok Sevdim	Hasan	Supporting role
2013–2015	Kurtlar Vadisi Pusu	Timur Emir	Supporting role
2015–2016	Evli ve Öfkeli	Cihan	Supporting role
2016	Altınsoylar	Oğuz Katran	Supporting role
2017–2019	Söz	Fethi Kulaksız (Avcı)	Supporting role
2019	Leke	Cem Yenilmez	Leading role
2020–2021	Kırmızı Oda	Dr. Deniz Saner	Leading role
2022	Aşkın Yolculuğu: Hacı Bayram-ı Veli	Numan bin Ahmed / Hacı Bayram-ı Veli	Leading role
2022	İçimizdeki Ateş	Doğan	Leading role
2023–2025	Hudutsuz Sevda	Fikret Leto	Leading role
2024	Çağla ile Bu Yaz	Himself	Guest appearance
2026–present	Yeraltı	Merdan Hanoğlu	Supporting role
Web series
Year	Title	Role	Notes
2021	Bonkis	Onur	Leading role
Theatre
Year	Title	Role	Notes
2020	İzmir'in Kızları	Ediz	Leading role

== Awards and nominations ==
Year	Award	Category	Work	Result
2019	5th Turkey Youth Awards	Best Supporting TV Actor	Söz	Nominated
2019	10. KTÜ Media Awards	Most Admired Supporting Actor	Söz	Nominated
2019	10. KTÜ Media Awards	Best TV Couple (Eylem & Fethi)	Söz	Nominated
2020	46th Golden Butterfly Awards	En İyi Erkek Oyuncu	Leke	Nominated
2020	46th Golden Butterfly Awards	Best TV Couple (Yasemin & Cem)	Leke	Nominated
