= Öztürk Serengil =

- Born: 2 May 1930; Artvin, Turkey
- Died: 11 January 1999 (aged 68); Istanbul, Turkey
- Occupations: Actor, comedian
- Years active: 1954–1997
- Children: 4, including Seren

Öztürk Serengil (2 May 1930 – 11 January 1999) was a Turkish actor and comedian. He is mostly known as one of the famous comedians in Turkish films.

== Biography ==
He was born in Artvin, Turkey on 2 May 1930, the son of a teacher. He started his acting career with the play Oğlum Edvard (My Son Edward). In 1958, he worked with Oda Theatre and since 1959, with Istanbul City Theatre. His first cinema film was Üçüncü Kat Cinayeti'. In his early films, he played the role of the villain. He took up comedy which quickly became very popular among the filmgoing public. He appeared in a total of more than 400 films and theatre plays.

Öztürk Serengil died of brain cancer on 11 January 1999 at the age of 68. He married four times and had four children. TV presenter Seren Serengil is his daughter. Three of his children, Jussi, Timur and Seray, he had with Finnish nurse Seija Serengil (née Kivistö) whom he met in Helsinki, Finland.
