= Səni Belə Sevmədilər =

Compilation album by Aygun Kazimova
- Released: 27 September 2015
- Genre: Pop
- Length: 64:26
- Label: Aygün Music
- Producer: Aygun Kazimova

Aygun Kazimova chronology
| Coffee from Colombia (2014) | Səni Belə Sevmədilər (2015) | Orasına Burasına (2017) |

Singles from Səni Belə Sevmədilər
- 1. "Düşün Məni" Released: 2011; 2. "Sene Xesteyem" Released: 2014; 3. "Səni Belə Sevmədilər" Released: 2015

Səni Belə Sevmədilər is a 2015 compilation album by Aygun Kazimova, composed of songs released in her 2008–2015 albums.

== Track listing ==
| # | Song | Composer | Lyricist | Time |
|---|---|---|---|---|
| 1 | Mən Sənsiz | Sevinc Tağıyeva | Sevinc Şirin | 4:10 |
| 2 | Mən Səninəm | Minayə Xanım | Cəlal Qurbanov | 5:01 |
| 3 | Məhəbbətə Hə, Xəyanətə Yox | Sevinc Tağıyeva | Kübra Kərimli | 4:37 |
| 4 | Düşün Məni | Sevinc Tağıyeva | Sevinc Şirin | 4:32 |
| 5 | Səni Sevirəm | | | 3:13 |
| 6 | Səni Belə Sevmədilər | Hakan Erol | Leyli Erol | 4:26 |
| 7 | Sənə Xəstəyəm | Hakan Erol | Fərdi | 4:45 |
| 8 | Bir Gecəlik | Gövhər Həsənzadə | Leyli Erol | 4:25 |
| 9 | Sevgilim Tək Mənimsən | Muxtar Abseynov | Cəlal Qurbanov | 3:53 |
| 10 | Gəl, Bax, Gör | Pərviz Mahmudov | Leyli Erol | 3:30 |
| 11 | Səninlə | | | 4:11 |
| 12 | Sən Artıq Mənimsən (feat. Gökhan Erol) | Hakan Erol | Leyli Erol | 4:23 |
| 13 | Deki Deki | Maria gracia Ortiz vasquez | Namiq Qaraçuxurlu | 3:37 |
| 14 | Xoşbəxt İllər | Minayə Xanım | Cəlal Qurbanov | 4:38 |
| 15 | Yanına Gəlirəm | | | 4:35 |

== Music videos ==
- "Düşün Məni"
