= Aygün Kazımova, Vol. 3 =

Studio album by Aygun Kazimova
- Released: February 25, 2008
- Genre: Pop
- Length: 73:19
- Label: Süper Müzik Yapım

Aygun Kazimova chronology
| Aygün Kazımova, Vol. 2 (2008) | Aygün Kazımova, Vol. 3 (2008) | Aygün Kazımova, Vol. 4 (2008) |

Aygün Kazımova, Vol. 3 is a studio album by Azerbaijani singer-songwriter Aygun Kazimova, released on February 25, 2008, by Süper Müzik Yapım.

== Track listing ==
| No. | Title | Length |
|---|---|---|
| 1. | "Elvida" | 3:54 |
| 2. | "Qelbımın Sheklını Cek" | 3:49 |
| 3. | "Senı Gozlerem" | 4:37 |
| 4. | "Tez Gel" | 4:02 |
| 5. | "Yol Polısı" | 4:40 |
| 6. | "Tenha Qadın (feat. Mono)" | 4:33 |
| 7. | "Inanmayardın" | 3:04 |
| 8. | "Sensız" | 4:53 |
| 9. | "Uyma" | 3:36 |
| 10. | "Eshq Badesı" | 4:34 |
| 11. | "Sen Inanmadın" | 4:08 |
| 12. | "Gel (feat. Elxan)" | 5:54 |
| 13. | "Gec Olacaq" | 5:27 |
| 14. | "Sevirem Demedım" | 6:38 |
| 15. | "Veten" | 4:52 |
| 16. | "Yeni Versiya" | 4:29 |
| 17. | "Yar" | 3:29 |
| Total length: | | 73:19 |
