= Mert Kılıç =

Turkish model and actor

- Born: 20 April 1978 (age 47); Merzifon, Turkey
- Occupations: Actor, model
- Years active: 2003–present
- Spouse: Aslıhan Güner (m. 2013)

Mert Kılıç (born 20 April 1978) is a Turkish actor and model.

Before starting his career as a model, Kılıç played football professionally in Vanspor, Edirnespor and Tekirdağspor. In 2002, he was chosen as the Best Model in a local competition. He later moved to the United States to study acting at the Beverly Hills Playhouse. After making his debut in 2003 with a supporting role in Gurbet Kadını, he continued his career with recurring roles. His breakthrough came with Şefkat Tepe, in which he had a leading role.

Between 2001–2002, he was in a relationship with Azerbaijani singer Aygün Kazımova. In June 2013, he married Aslıhan Güner, his co-star from Şefkat Tepe.

== Filmography ==
Television
Year	Title	Role	Notes
2014–2015	Sungurlar	Serdar Mert	Leading role
2010–2014	Şefkat Tepe	Serdar Mert	Leading role
2007	Kara Duvak	Cenk	Supporting role
2005	Asla Unutma	Emir	Supporting role
2004	Tatil Aşkları	Taner	Supporting role
2003	Gurbet Kadını	Ökkeş	Supporting role
Film
Year	Title	Role	Notes
2022	Komutan	Major Tuna Alkan	Leading role; director, scriptwriter, producer
