= Academy company =

Academy company is a term used for an organization that is well known as a place to start a professional career and provides leaders to other companies. Often academy companies hire the majority of their staff from recent college and university graduates, and provide extensive training. Academy companies are frequently targeted by executive search firms as sources of talent. Often academy companies have "up or out" policies that facilitate organizational growth and development.

Examples of academy companies:

- PepsiCo
- Procter & Gamble
- General Mills
- Kraft Foods
- Goldman Sachs
- JPMorgan Chase
- General Electric
- McKinsey & Company
- Bain & Company
- Boston Consulting Group
- Hewlett-Packard
- Unilever
