= Seren Serengil =

Turkish TV presenter, singer and actress (born 1971)

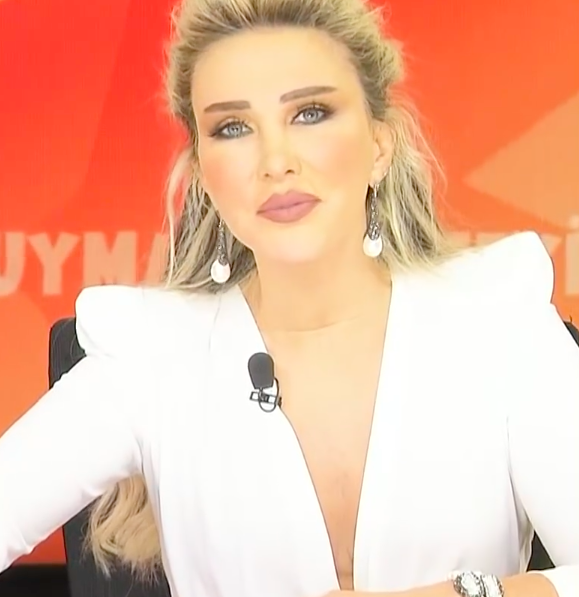
- Serengil while presenting the program Duymadık Demeyin in May 2019
- Born: 6 April 1971 (age 55); Şişli, Istanbul, Turkey
- Education: Yıldız College
- Occupations: TV presenter; singer; actress
- Years active: 1977–present
- Spouses: Ozan Kaçmaz (m. 2000; div. 2002) Cengiz İmren (m. 2002; div. 2005) Musa Aytun (m. 2006; div. 2010) Yaşar İpek (m. 2018; div. 2020)
- Children: 1 (deceased)
- Parent(s): Öztürk Serengil; Nevin Teoman
- Musical career
- Genres: Fantasy; pop
- Labels: Raks Kaya; Avrupa; Bomonti; Cmp

Seren Serengil (born 6 April 1971) is a Turkish TV presenter, singer and actress. She was born in Istanbul, Turkey, and has acted in films and TV series. Her father Öztürk Serengil was an actor, theatre performer and showman.

== Personal life ==
Serengil was born on 6 April 1971 at the Istanbul American Hospital. She made her acting debut as a child actress in the 1977 movie Sarhoş, alongside her father Öztürk Serengil. In the same year, she started to perform at Gar Casino together with her father.

After two failed attempts, on 3 April 2009 Serengil gave birth to a daughter from her marriage to Musa Aytun. Their daughter, whom they named Stephanie, was born prematurely and died four days later on 7 April.

In 2017, Gülben Ergen sued Seren Serengil due to the comments she had made about Ergen's private life on Star TV's program Duymayan Kalmasın, and in October 2017 a court in Istanbul ruled that Serengil "could not come closer than 30 meters to Ergen, could not insult her or commit any violence against her" for six months. The court eventually sentenced Serengil to a three-day imprisonment in January 2018.

Serengil, who married Yaşar İpek in May 2018, announced her pregnancy through IVF in August 2019. Later that month, she filed for divorce from her husband and revealed that he had not been by her side during her pregnancy. On 1 September 2019, Serengil announced her pregnancy had ended in miscarriage. The couple's divorce was finalized in September 2020.

== Discography ==
Albums and EPs

- Ayrıldık (1991)
- Alıştım Sana Birtanem (1994)
- Bana Yasak (1996)
- Bu Gecenin Hatırına (1998)
- Dost Bile Kalamadık (2006)
- Ben Adamı Ayrılırken Tanırım (2010)

Singles

- "Beni Benimle Bırak" (with Yaşar İpek) (2018)
- "Çok Geç" (2019)
- "Kim O Sakallı Adam" (with Yasin Aydın) (2019)
- "Valla" (2022)

== Filmography ==
Films

- Sarhoş (1977)
- Alev Gibi Bir Kız (1990)
- Başka Olur Ağaların Düğünü (1990)
- Yasak Sokaklar (1993)
- Belalım Benim (1999)
- Şükran Büfe (2000)
- Şaşkın Assolist (2005)

Television programs

- Seren Serengil Show (TGRT)
- Bu Gecenin Hatrına Show (TGRT)
- Yeniden Başlayalım (Barışalım) (StarMax)
- Uçankuş 4x4 (Show TV)
- Seren Serengil ile Evlenir Misin ? (2011) (Show TV)
- Yalnızlar Kulübü (2011) (Beyaz TV)
- Kim Ne Derse Desin (2014) (Cine5)
- Duymayan Kalmasın (2016–2018) (Star TV)
- Duymadık Demeyin (2019) (TV100)
- Söylemezsem Olmaz (2020–) (Beyaz TV)
