= Esin Turan =

Turkish painter and sculptor (born 1970)

- Born: 1970 (age 55–56); Konya, Turkey
- Education: Hacettepe University (1992)
- Alma mater: Academy of Fine Arts in Vienna
- Known for: Painting; Sculpture

Esin Turan (born 1970) is a Turkish painter and sculptor who currently resides in Vienna. Turan focuses her work on overcoming Western stereotypes of the Muslim world.

Turan completed her studies at the Sculpture Department of the Arts Faculty of Hacettepe University before, in 1992, continuing her studies at the Academy of Fine Arts in Vienna with Professor Bruno Gironcoli. Between 1992 and 1993, Turan attended the University of Applied Art in Vienna as a guest student under Wander Bertoni. Between 1993 and 1999, she organized and created workshops at Verein Kiddy & Co. in Vienna. Starting in 2009, Turan continued her education with a doctoral degree at Angewante Kunst, Vienna with professor Christian Reder. Today she continues her work and lives in Vienna.

Her works focus on the concept of femininity in reflections on society, sexuality, current events and their inner connection to the past and the effects of time and space, developing her own unique artistic mark in various modes of expression. Her works have been purchased by the Austrian Ministry of Education, Science and Arts, the City of Vienna, and various private collectors and have been exhibited in Turkey, Austria, Germany, Spain, United States and Japan.
