= Burak Serdar Şanal =

Turkish actor

- Born: 28 August 1988 (age 37); Istanbul, Turkey
- Occupations: Actor, TV presenter
- Years active: 2008–present

Burak Serdar Şanal (born 28 August 1988) is a Turkish actor.

== Life and career ==
A graduate of Maltepe University with a degree in drama studies, Şanal had his first serious acting experience between 2008 and 2009 with a role in the popular series Küçük Kadınlar. At the same time, he portrayed the character of Murat in the Peri Masalı fantasy child series. He played in surreal comedy film Tut Sözünü. In 2008, he joined the cast of Bahar Dalları, playing the role of Mert. Playing in these series marked the breakthrough in his career and in 2011, Şanal was cast in Fox daily series Dinle Sevgili as Tolon.

His portrayal of the character Can in the 2011 TRT 1 comedy series Avrupa Avrupa was praised by the critics. He appeared in a leading role in the second season of Avrupa Avrupa, playing the role of Ceyhun. Another breakthrough in his career occurred between 2014 and 2016, during which he won the praise of the audience with his role in TRT comedy series Yeşil Deniz as İsmail. In 2023, Yeşil Deniz came back with new season in TRT Dijital. He was then cast in Fox series Rüzgarın Kalbi alongside Deniz Baysal. In 2019, he had the role of Süleyman in the series Kimse Bilmez.

== Filmography ==
Television
Year	Title	Role	Notes
2008	Arka Sokaklar	Ceyhun	Guest appearance
2008	Peri Masalı	Murat	Supporting role
2009	Bahar Dalları	Mert	Supporting role
2009	Küçük Kadınlar	Koray	Supporting role
2011–2012	Avrupa Avrupa	Can	Leading role
2011	Dinle Sevgili	Tolon	Supporting role
2014	Tut Sözünü	Bernardo	Leading role / film
2014–2015	Yeşil Deniz	İsmail Bakır	Leading role
2015	Kızlar ve Anneleri	Himself	Presenter
2016	Rüzgarın Kalbi	Rüzgar	Leading role
2019	Kimse Bilmez	Pilot / Süleyman	Leading role
