= Davetsiz Misafir =

Davetsiz Misafir (The Uninvited Guest) is Turkey's unique magazine of science-fiction, politics and criticism.

It was founded in 2002 and published as a non-profit publication by students from social and political science departments of Boğaziçi University. Davetsiz Misafir is now Turkey's best known science-fiction, politics and criticism magazine with its writers composed of students, men of letters, scientists, academics, feminists, anarchists, activists and even prisoners from all over the country. It includes articles concerning politics, post-structuralism, anarchism, feminism, anti-militarism, independent cinema, and arts. Between 2002 and 2005 the magazine was published seasonally and distributed nationwide. The first Turkish translation of Donna Haraway's A Cyborg Manifesto appeared in the 9th issue of Davetsiz Misafir magazine. Striking interviews with famous writers, thinkers and activists such as Noam Chomsky, Jean Baudrillard, the Unabomber, Arthur Kroker, J. G. Ballard, Peter Sloterdijk were published during this period. After the publication of the 10th issue of the magazine, in 2006 Davetsiz Misafir was converted into an online magazine.
