= Aslıhan Güner =

Turkish actress (born 1987)

- Born: 17 December 1987 (age 38); Istanbul, Turkey
- Occupation: Actress
- Years active: 2002–present
- Spouse: Mert Kılıç (m. 2013)

Aslıhan Güner (born 17 December 1987) is a Turkish actress.

Her mother is from Malatya, while her father is from Sivas. Her maternal grandparents are of Bosnian descent. Her paternal grandparents are of Turkish descent and immigrated from Bulgaria. She studied public relations and advertising at the university but left without completing her education. Güner then studied acting at the Barış Manço Culture Center. In June 2013, she married Mert Kılıç, her co-star from Şefkat Tepe. .

After appearing in a number of supporting roles in popular series, her breakthrough came with the TV series Asi and Şefkat Tepe, in which she had leading roles. She joined the historical series "Bir Zamanlar Osmanlı", "Diriliş: Ertuğrul," and the agent series "Kızıl Elma."

She played in the comedy series "Kuzey Yıldızı". Meanwhile, she appeared in different movies, notably the comedy film series Sümela'nın Şifresi: Temel. She portrayed as Zübeyde Hanım in film "Zübeyde Analar ve Oğullar".

== Filmography ==
Film
Year	Title	Role	Notes	
2005	The İmam	Zehra	Leading role	
2007	Sözün Bittiği Yer	Aslıhan	Leading role	
2007	Yuvamı Yıkamazsın	Pelin	Leading role (TV film)	
2011	Sümela'nın Şifresi: Temel	Zuhal Yücesoy	Leading role	
2012	Moskova'nın Şifresi: Temel	Zuhal Yücesoy	Leading role	
2013	Geceler Yarim Oldu	Gülcan	Leading role (TV film)	
2015	Selam: Bahara Yolculuk	Sevgi	Leading role	
2017	Ver Kaç	Nazlı	Leading role	
2019	Akıllara Seza	Seza	Leading role	
2020	Hanımağa'nın Gelinleri	Defne	Leading role (TV film)	
2022	Komutan	Züleyha	Leading role	
2023	Prestij Meselesi	Semiha Topaloğlu	Leading role	
2023	Zübeyde Analar ve Ogullar	Zübeyde Hanim	Leading role	
2025	Sonradan Gurme	Rüya	Leading role	Television
Year	Title	Role	Notes	
2002	Sırlar Dünyası	Nazlı	Leading role of episode	
2004	Büyük Buluşma	Zeynep	Leading role of episode	
2006	Selena	Demeter 1	Supporting role	
2006	Esir Kalpler		Supporting role	
2006	Eksi 18		Supporting role	
2006	Sevda Çiçeği		Supporting role	
2006	Çemberimde Gül Oya	Dilek	Supporting role	
2007	Zeliha'nın Gözleri	Selma	Supporting role	
2007	Asi	Gonca Kozcuoğlu	Supporting role	
2010–2014	Şefkat Tepe	Leyla / Yasemin	Leading role	
2012	Bir Zamanlar Osmanlı	Esma	Leading role/joined	
2013	Herşey Yolunda Merkez	Yasemin	Leading role	
2014	Kızıl Elma	Azra	Leading role/joined	
2016	Kehribar	Bahar Bozoğlu	Supporting role	
2017	Diriliş: Ertuğrul	Karaca Hatun	Supporting role	
2019–2021	Kuzey Yıldızı İlk Aşk	Yıldız Kadıoğlu	Leading role	
2021	Uzak Şehrin Masalı	Umay Demirkan	Leading role	
2024	YALAN	Melike Karaca	Leading role	
