= Jessica May =

Brazilian-Turkish actress and model (born 1993)

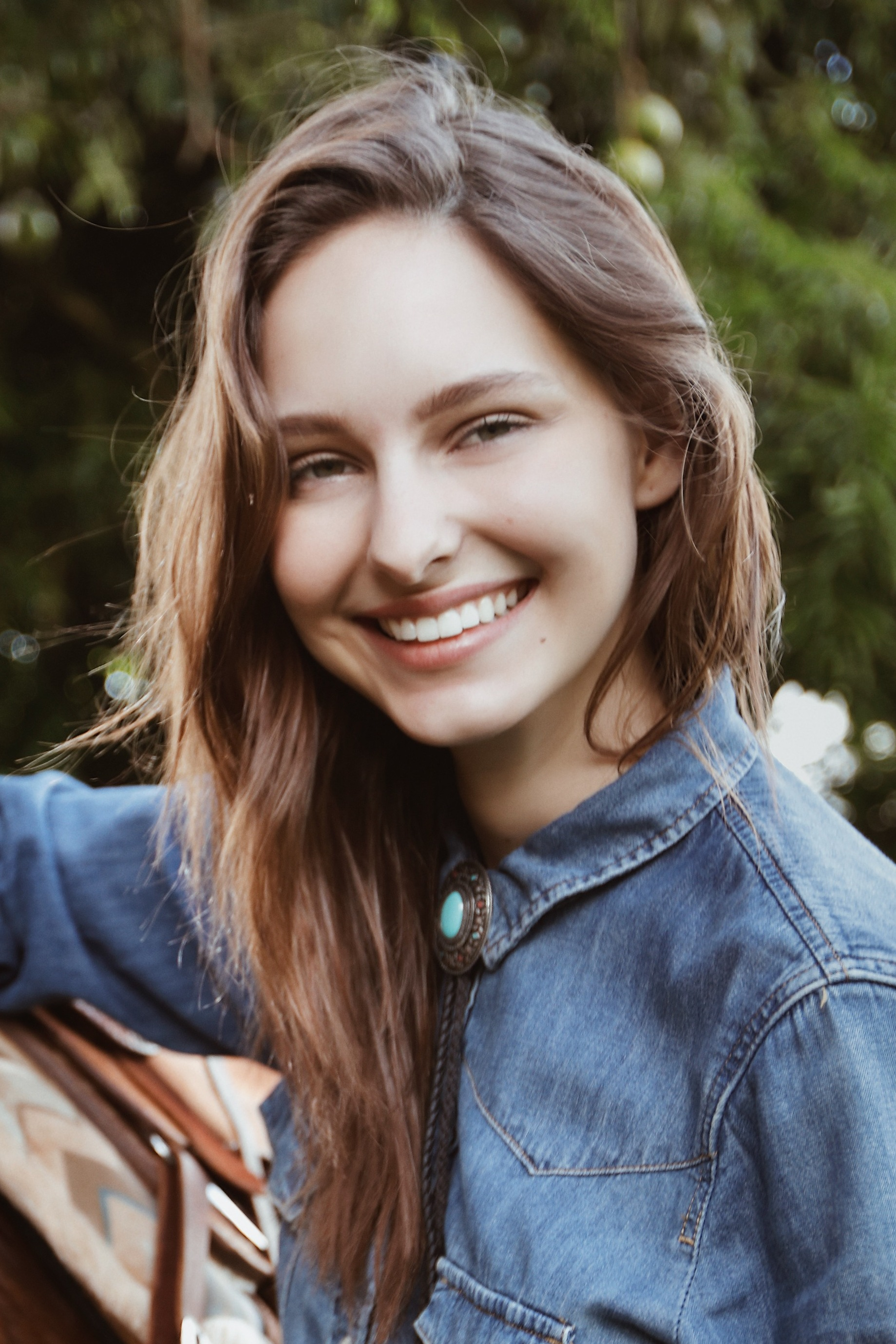
- Born: Jessica May Drociunas; December 5, 1993 (age 32); Paranacity, Brazil
- Occupations: Actress, model
- Years active: 2017–present
- Spouse: Hüseyin Kara (m. 2018)

Jessica May Drociunas (born December 5, 1993) is a Brazilian and Turkish actress and model, based in Turkey. May made her acting debut with a leading role on the Turkey television series Yeni Gelin (2017–18). She later starred in the film Dert Bende (2019) and Katakulli (2022) film series.

== Early life ==
Jessica May was born on December 5, 1993, in Paranacity, Brazil. Her mother is a teacher and her father is a farmer. She lived on a farm until she was 15 years old, and worked in São Paulo before beginning an acting career in Turkey.

== Career ==
The first actress experience of May in professional terms has been with the Yeni Gelin, launched in 2017. Also it was her first leading role. Yeni Gelin continued 3 seasons with 63 episodes. She later rose to prominence by acting in the cinema movie Dert Bende in 2019. May walked the catwalk at Mercedes-Benz Fashion Week in Istanbul. Jessica played the character of "Maria" on ATV (Turkish TV channel)'s series Maria ile Mustafa (Maria and Mustafa) She currently stars as one of the lead roles in the ATV's series Yalnız Kurt produced by Osman Sınav.

== Personal life ==
May married Turkish photographer Hüseyin Kara on June 30, 2018. She became Turkish citizen by marriage in 2022.

== Filmography ==
=== Films ===
Year	Title	Role	Notes
2019	Dert Bende	Pelin	Leading role
2022	Katakulli	Isabel	Leading role
2022	Katakulli: Gözükaralar	Isabel	Leading role
2022	Katakulli: Tuzak	Isabel	Leading role
2022	Katakulli: Tam Zamanı	Isabel	Leading role
2025	The Grand Amir and Donna Maria	Donna Maria	Leading role

=== Television series ===
Year	Title	Role	Notes	Network
2017–2018	Yeni Gelin	Bella	Leading role	Show TV
2020	Maria ile Mustafa	Maria	Leading role	ATV
2022	Yalnız Kurt	Meryem	Leading role	ATV
2023	Kapı	Alesia Deniz Boreas	Leading role	Tabii

=== Commercials ===
- Özdilek (2018–19)
- Duru (2024)

== Awards and nominations ==
Year	Ceremony	Award	Work	Result
2017	Altın Badem Awards	Best Comedy Actress	Yeni Gelin	Won
2017	Moon Life Awards	Best TV Comedy Actress	Yeni Gelin	Won
2018	23rd Golden Lens Awards	Best TV Comedy Actress	Yeni Gelin	Won
2018	45th Golden Butterfly Awards	Best TV Comedy Actress	Yeni Gelin	Nominated
2018	Istanbul University Gold 61 Awards	Best Actress	Yeni Gelin	Won
2019	Okan University Bests of the Year	Best Foreign Actress	Yeni Gelin	Won
2019	5th Golden Palm Awards	Best TV Comedy Actress	Yeni Gelin	Won
2022	Turkey Innovation and Success Awards	Best Foreign Actress	Yalnız Kurt	Won
2022	9th Golden Palm Awards	Best TV Actress of The Year	Yalnız Kurt	Won
2023	10th Golden Palm Awards	Best Foreign Actress	Kapı	Won
