= İdil Fırat =

Turkish actress (born 1972)

- Born: 5 November 1972 (age 52); Ankara, Turkey
- Occupation: Actress

İdil Fırat (born 5 November 1972) is a Turkish actress.

== Biography ==
İdil Fırat was born in Ankara on 5 November 1972. She graduated in theatre from Dokuz Eylül University's Conservatory. She worked at İzmir State Theatre, İzmir Child Theatre, Ankara Art Theatre and Dormen Theatre. Fırat has appeared in series such as Yüzleşme, Ayrılsak da Beraberiz, Aşk ve Gurur, 90-60-90, Deli Yürek and Köprü, and films such as Kolay Para, Gülüm, G.O.R.A, Münferit and Kaybedenler Kulübü.

== Filmography ==
- Rüzgar Gülü (1999)
- Yüzleşme (1999)
- Ayrılsak da Beraberiz (1999)
- Deli Yürek (1999)
- Oyun Bitti (2000)
- Evdeki Yabancı (2000)
- 90-60-90 (2001)
- Gülüm (2002)
- Zerda (2002)
- Kolay Para (2002)
- Aşk ve Gurur (2002)
- Bir İstanbul Masalı (2003)
- Vizontele Tuuba (2004)
- G.O.R.A (2004)
- Karım ve Annem (2004)
- Canın Sağolsun (2005)
- Seher Vakti (2005)
- Kabuslar Evi: Gece Gelen Arkadaşla (2006)
- Köprü (2006)
- Münferit (2007)
- Kalpsiz Adam (2008)
- Geniş Aile (2009)
- Arka Sokaklar (2009)
- Kirli Beyaz (2010)
- Kaybedenler Kulübü (2011)
- Nar (2011)
- Kalbim Seni Seçti (2011)
- Şubat (2012)
- Çıplak Gerçek (2012)
- Acayip Hikâyeler (2012)
- Senin Hikâyen (2013)
- Ben Onu Çok Sevdim (2013)
- Leyla ile Mecnun (2013)
- Hayat Ağacı (2014)
- Poyraz Karayel (2015)
- Mehmed: Bir Cihan Fatihi (2018)
- Ramo (2020)
