= Özge Özacar =

Turkish actress (born 22 Nisan 1995)

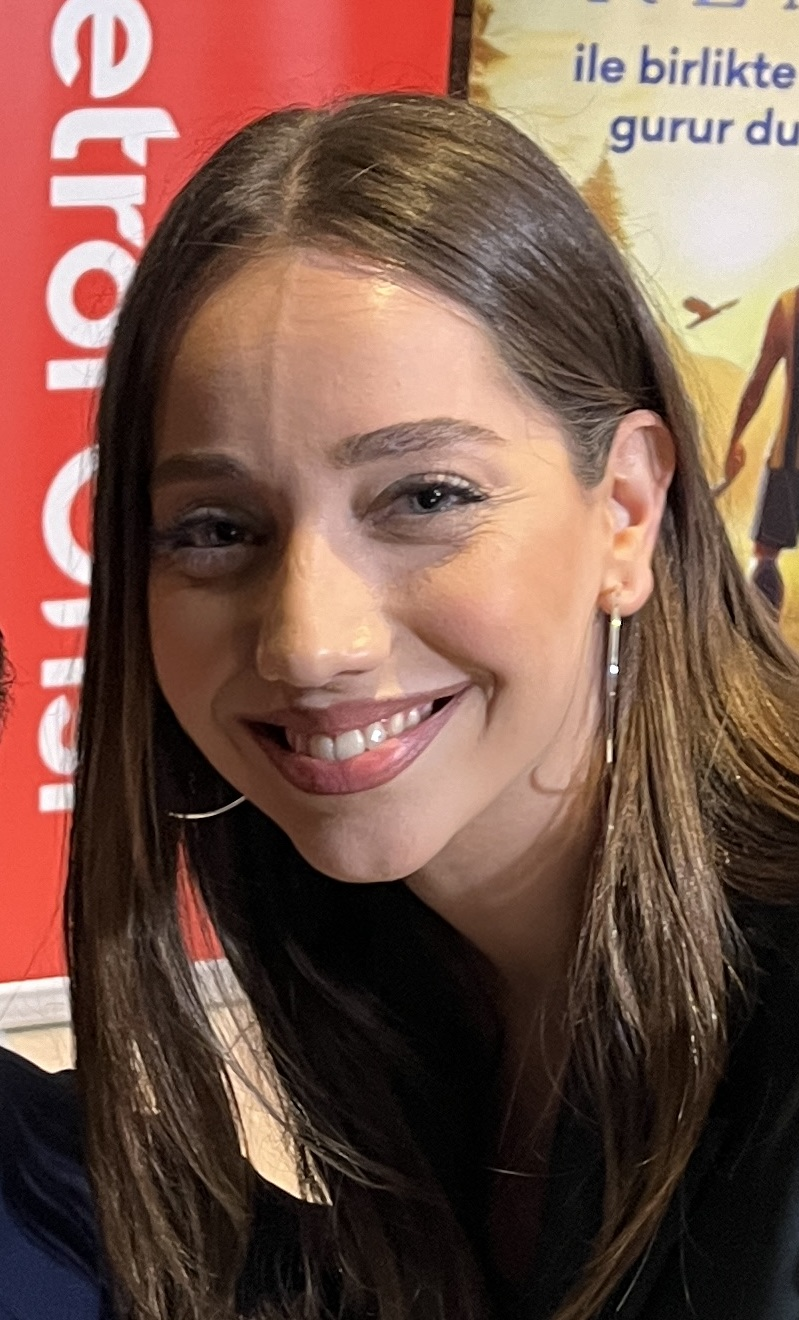
- Born: 22 April 1995 (age 31); Istanbul, Turkey
- Education: Marmara University
- Occupation: Actress
- Years active: 2015–present

Özge Özacar (born 22 April 1995) is a Turkish actress.

She is known for her roles as Arzu in the comedy film Bursa Bülbülü (2023) and Görkem Erdem in the television drama Kızılcık Şerbeti (2024–2025).

== Early life and education ==
Özge Özacar was born on 22 April 1995 in Istanbul, Turkey. She graduated from Marmara University, in the department of journalism. She acquired her acting training from Istanbul Centre, she obtained training from Zeynep Günay Tan. The actress is fluent in English and French.

Before attending university, Özacar studied journalism at Bahçelievler Aydın Doğan Vocational and Technical Anatolian High School in Istanbul. During her university years, she completed an internship at a television channel and subsequently began working with a talent manager.

In addition to her training with Zeynep Günay Tan, she studied acting with Merve Taşkan, Bahar Kerimoğlu and Harika Uygur. Her training included the Meisner technique, the Chubbuck technique and techniques associated with Jacques Lecoq.

== Career ==
Özacar started her acting career in 2015, she made her debut in the series Tatlı Küçük Yalancılar adaptation of Pretty Little Liars and portrayed the character of Müge. In 2016, she made her appearance in the series Oyunbozan and depicted the character of Zeynep. In 2017, she was cast in the youth series Lise Devriyesi and depicted the character of Meltem. The show starred Mehmet Ozan Dolunay and Bahar Şahin. In the same year, she had a main role in the popular series Meryem and portrayed the character of Naz. In 2019, she made first cinematic debut in the movie Hababam Sınıfı Yeniden and depicted the character of Didem. In the same year, she had a leading role in the series Sevgili Geçmiş and depicted the character of Azra, who earned money by entertaining people in the bar and grew up in a dormitory. In 2020, she was starred in the series Kerafet and portrayed the character of Meltem Serez, the show starred Mert Fırat and Nurgül Yeşilçay.

In 2023, Özacar starred alongside Cem Gelinoğlu in the comedy television series Kısmet and the comedy film Bursa Bülbülü.

In 2024, Özacar joined the cast of the television drama Kızılcık Şerbeti, broadcast on Show TV, portraying Görkem Erdem, who becomes the second wife of Fatih Ünal. Her performance and the character's controversial storyline received media attention. In an interview with Elele magazine in August 2024, Özacar discussed her approach to portraying Görkem and the public response to the character. She departed from the series in January 2025.

In 2026, she appeared as Aynur in the action comedy film D.I.S.C.O., directed by Ömer Faruk Sorak, alongside Giray Altınok and Kerem Özdoğan. The film was released theatrically in Turkey on 1 January 2026. Later that year, she portrayed Gülru in the horror film Soy, directed by Maxime Alexandre, which was released in Turkey on 9 October 2026.

Also in 2026, Özacar starred opposite Murat Ünalmış in the television drama Sevdan Bir Ateş, portraying Leyla. Produced by CNP Film and broadcast on Show TV, the series premiered on 9 September 2026 and was filmed in Cappadocia.

== Personal life ==
Özacar was rumoured to be dating Turkish actor Furkan Andıç when the kissing photo of two of them went viral, however Andıç stated they were just friends.

== Filmography ==
Films
Year	Title	Role
2019	Hababam Sınıfı Yeniden	Didem
2023	Bursa Bülbülü	Arzu
2026	D.I.S.C.O.	Aynur
TV series
2015	Tatlı Küçük Yalancılar	Müge
2016	Oyunbozan	Zeynep
2017	Lise Devriyesi	Meltem
2017–2018	Meryem	Naz Sargun
2019	Sevgili Geçmiş	Azra Yılmaz
2020–2021	Kefaret	Meltem Serez
2022	Baba	Cansu Erim
2023	Kısmet	Melike Dağveren
2024–2025	Kızılcık Şerbeti	Görkem Erdem
2026	Sevdan Bir Ateş	Leyla Kızılırmak
Streaming series
2021	Seyyar	Çiğdem
2022	Hayaller ve Hayatlar	Mehveş Karatan

== Awards and nominations ==
Year	Award	Category	Work	Result	Ref.
2023	49th Golden Butterfly Awards	Best Actress in a Romantic Comedy Series	style="background: #FFE3E3; color: black; vertical-align: middle; text-align: center; " class="no table-no2 notheme"|Nominated		
