= Mümtaz Sevinç =

Turkish actor (1953–2006)

Mümtaz Sevinç (1 February 1953 in Elazığ – 24 January 2006 in Istanbul) was a Turkish actor who had taken part in theater acting as well as many roles in TV's and movies. He graduated from Hacettepe University, Faculty of Engineering Physics Department and in 1978 began working in the State Theater. In 1994, he began to take part in Istanbul State Theater. He was stabbed to death by his common-law spouse on the 24 January 2006. in Istanbul, Turkey.

== Filmography ==
Actor

- Sev kardesim (2006) TV mini-series
- Nehir (2005) TV mini-series .... Sait
- Askimizda ölüm var (2004) TV mini-series .... Yusuf Akdogan
- Sihirli annem (2003) TV mini-series .... Umur
- Emanet (2002) TV mini-series
- Çifte bela (2001) TV mini-series .... Osman
- Sehnaz tango (2000) TV series .... Ziya
- Gülün bittigi yer (1999)
- Hayal kurma oyunlari (1999) .... Kayinbirader
- Hosçakal yarin (1998) .... Sikiyönetim Avukati ... aka Goodbye Tomorrow (USA)
- Deli divane (1997) TV series .... Beyefendi
- Kurtulus (1994) TV mini-series .... Gen. Ali Fuat Pasa

Self

- Bir yudum insan-Ayhan Isik (1998) (TV) (voice) .... Narrator
- Bir yudum insan-Can Yücel (1998) (TV) (voice) .... Himself
