= Cem Gelinoğlu =

Turkish actor

- Born: 20 July 1983 (age 42); Düzce, Turkey
- Occupations: Actor, screenwriter
- Years active: 2015–present

Cem Gelinoğlu (born 20 July 1983) is a Turkish actor and screenwriter. He is the creator of the Ali Kundilli series of comedy movies.

== Filmography ==
Television
Year	Title	Role	Notes
2023	Kısmet	Doğan	Leading role
Cinema
Year	Title	Role	Notes
2015	Ali Kundilli	Ali Kundilli	Leading role, screenwriter
2016	Ali Kundilli 2	Ali Kundilli	Leading role, screenwriter
2016	Yok Artık 2	Aykut	Leading role
2017	Şansımı Seveyim	Sebahattin	Leading role
2019	Aykut Enişte	Aykut	Leading role, screenwriter
2020	Bize Müsaade	Commissioner	Guest appearance
2021	Aykut Enişte 2	Aykut	Leading role, screenwriter
Streaming series and films
Year	Title	Role	Notes
2023	Bursa Bülbülü	Taşkın Neşe	Leading role
