= Cengiz Bozkurt =

Turkish actor (born 1964)

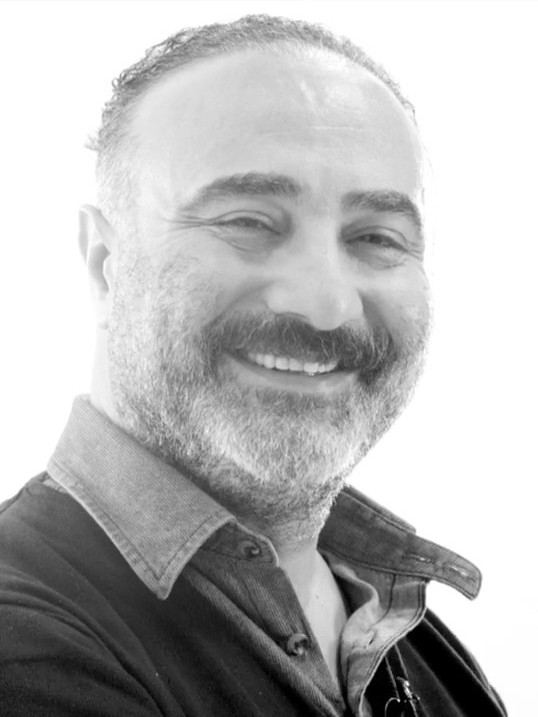
- Bozkurt in 2015
- Born: Mehmet Cengiz Bozkurt; 24 December 1964 (age 61); Gülşehir, Nevşehir, Turkey
- Occupation: Actor
- Years active: 1990–present

Mehmet Cengiz Bozkurt (born 24 December 1964) is a Turkish actor. He is best known for his role as Erdal Bakkal in the hit surreal comedy series Leyla ile Mecnun.

A graduate of Ankara Atatürk Lisesi, in 1984 he enrolled in Middle East Technical University to study physics but changed his major to stage acting in 1990. He then moved to England, where he lived for 14 years. In 1996, he graduated from Goldsmiths, University of London with a degree in "Media and Communication" studies. He then briefly shot documentaries for some channels and directed short movies. He returned to acting with the encouragement of Mehmet Ergen and worked at Arcola Theatre. Upon returning to Turkey, he continued his career by appearing in various movies and TV series.

== Filmography ==
Film
Year	Title	Role	Director
2025	Uykucu	Selim	
2024	Mucize Aynalar	Şahap Cenabettin	
2024	Efsane	Faruk	
2023	Kuru Otlar Üstüne	Hademe Nail	
2022	Yılbaşı Gecesi	Ahmet	Ozan Açıktan
2022	Kim Bu Aile?	Adem	
2019	Cinayet Süsü	Komiser Salih	Ali Atay
2018	Mutluluk Zamanı	Tarık	Şenol Sönmez
2018	Ailecek Şaşkınız	Muzaffer	Selçuk Aydemir
2016	Sen Benim HerŞeyimsin	Birol	Tolga Örnek
2016	Küçük Esnaf	Fahrettin	Bedran Güzel
2015	İyi Biri	Mızrap	Ayhan Sonyürek
2015	Kara Bela	Kudret	Burak Aksak
2015	Bana Masal Anlatma	Nafi	Burak Aksak
2014	Pek Yakında	Suat	Cem Yılmaz
2013	Sen Aydınlatırsın Geceyi	Dev	Onur Ünlü
2013	Eyyvah Eyvah 3	Organizatör	Hakan Algül
2012	Uzun Hikâye	Müstahdem	Osman Sınav
2012	Öz Hakiki Karakol	Hasan	İbrahim Güler
2012	Kod Adı Venüs	Adamos	Tamer Garip
2012	Takip: İstanbul	Sınır Görevlisi	Olivier Megaton
2012	Can	Fevzi	Raşit Çelikezer
2012	Vücut	Yılmaz	Mustafa Nuri
2012	Berlin Kaplanı	Emlakçı Tayyar	Hakan Algül
2011	Celal Tan ve Ailesinin Aşırı Acıklı Hikayesi	Hakkı	Onur Ünlü
2010	Kaybedenler Kulübü	Taksi durağındaki şoför	Tolga Örnek
2010	Ay Lav Yu	Sado	Sermiyan Midyat
2008	Kavşak	Vedat	Selim Demirdelen
2008	Gökten Üç Elma Düştü	Mafya	Raşit Çelikezer
2008	My Marlon and Brando	Azad	Hüseyin Karabey
2008	For a Moment, Freedom	Otel Şefi	Arash T. Riahi
2008	Devrim Arabaları	Ender	Tolga Örnek
2007	Taş Yastık		Fatih Hacıosmanoğlu
2007	Pazar - Bir Ticaret Masalı	Hasan	Ben Hopkins
2007	Yumurta		Semih Kaplanoğlu
2006	The Net 2.0	Polis memuru	Charles Winkler
Web series
Year	Title	Role	Director
2024	A Round of Applause	Kudret / Sertaç	Berkun Oya
2021–2022	Orta Kafa Aşk	Fikri Bilir	Can Evrenol
2021	50M2	Muhtar	Selçuk Aydemir
2018–2020	Jet Sosyete	Cengiz Özpamuk	Hakan Algül
2011–2023	Leyla ile Mecnun	Erdal Bakkal	Onur Ünlü
TV series
Year	Title	Role	Director
2026–	Tuzlu Kahve	Ünver İpekli	
2025–	Erşan Kuneri	Ümit Sizdaroğlu	
2024–2025	Leyla: Hayat... Aşk... Adalet...	Selman	
2023–2024	Teşkilat	Çetin Erdemsoy	Burak Arlıel
2022	Kara Tahta	Arif Kandemir	Ender Mıhlar
2020–2021	Kuzey Yıldızı İlk Aşk	Cevher	Ersoy Güler
2020	Gençliğim Eyvah	Arif Asmalı	Deniz Yılmaz Şayir
2016	Hangimiz Sevmedik	Şener Yeşil	Metin Balekoğlu
2015	Kocamın Ailesi	Dilaver	Şafak Bal
2014	Hom Ofis	Hamdi	Emre Kavuk
2013	Sevdaluk	Muhtar Ali	Yüksel Aksu
2013–2014	Aramızda Kalsın	Halil	Güzide Balcı
2013	Ben de Özledim	Cengiz	Onur Ünlü
2007	Sevgili Dünürüm	Osman	Hakan Algül
2006–2009	Parmaklıklar Ardında	Ekrem	Hakan Gürtop
2006	Karagümrük Yanıyor	Sıtkı	
2006	Ezo Gelin	Duran	
2005	Seni Çok Özledim	Serhan Ertunç	Dilek Gökçin
2005	Körfez Ateşi		Şafak Bakkalbaşıoğlu
2005	Kırık Kanatlar	Şeref	
2005	Kurşun Yarası		Sadullah Celen
TV theatre
Year	Title	Role	Director
2016	Geldim Gördüm Güldüm	Cengiz Canbazoğlu	Hakan Algül

== Discography ==
#	Song	Notes
1	Akdeniz Akşamları	
2	Kolpa	duet with Ali Atay, Serkan Keskin, Osman Sonant and Ahmet Mümtaz Taylan
3	Ben de Özledim	duet with Serkan Keskin and Ali Atay
4	Okul Yolunda	
5	Kalenin Bedenleri	duet with Serkan Keskin, Osman Sonant, Ahmet Mümtaz Taylan and Ali Atay
6	Huzurum Kalmadı	
7	Hatasız Kul Olmaz	

== Awards ==
- 24th Sadri Alışık Theatre and Cinema Awards, "Best Supporting Actor in a Comedy Role" - Ailecek Şaşkınız (2019)
- 47th International Antalya Golden Orange Film Festival, "Best Supporting Actor" - Kavşak (2010)
