= Tansu Biçer =

Turkish actor

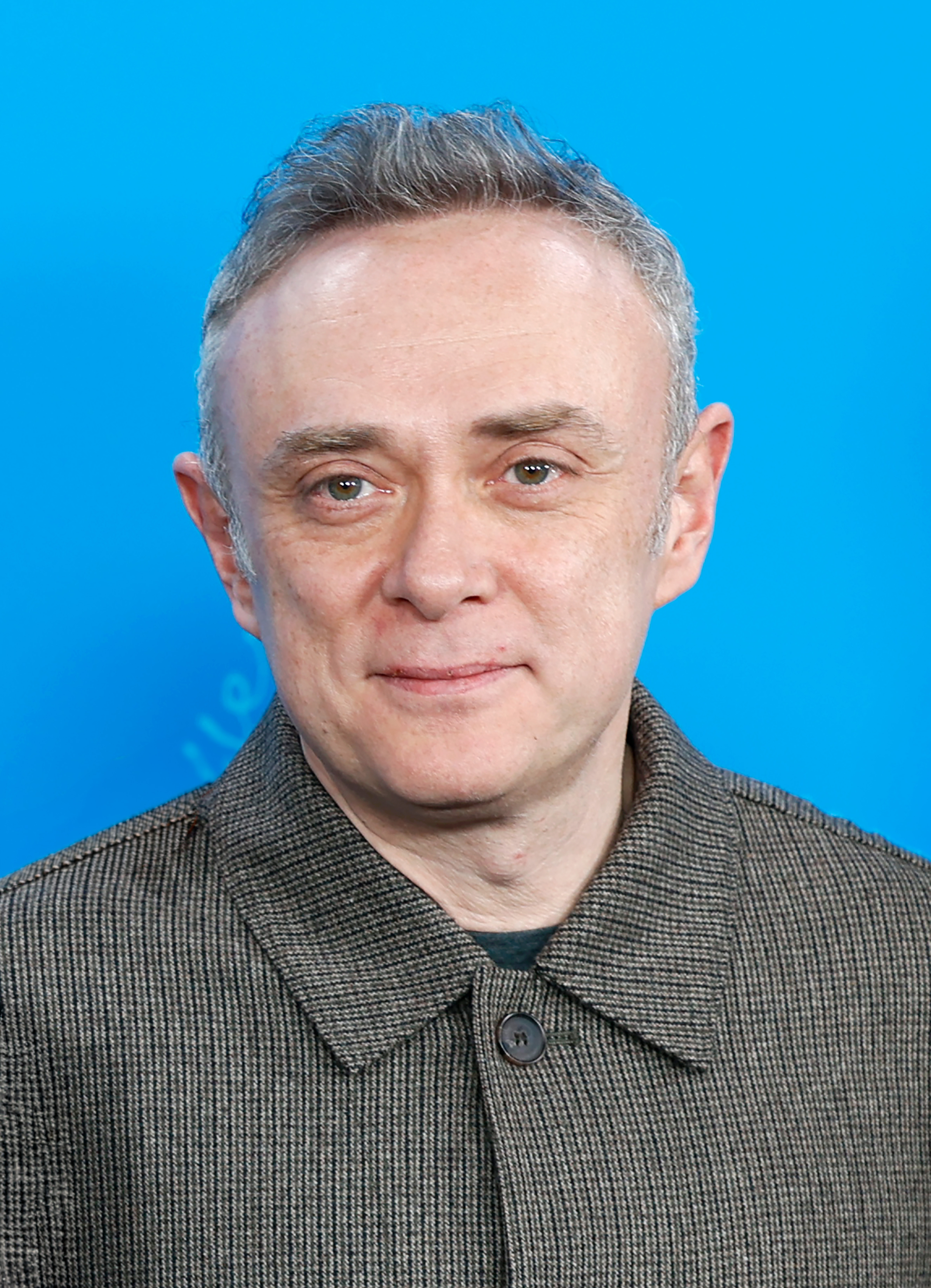
- Biçer in 2026
- Born: 4 July 1978 (age 48); Ankara, Turkey
- Occupation: Actor
- Years active: 2000–present

Tansu Biçer (born 4 July 1978) is a Turkish actor.

== Life and career ==
Biçer was born on 4 July 1978 in Ankara. He is a graduate of Karşıyaka Şemikler High School in İzmir. He finished his studies at Anadolu University State Conservatory with a degree in theatre studies in 2001. Between 2001–2002, he worked at Theatre Anadolu. In 2002. he moved to Istanbul and helped with founding a theatre institution called Semaver Company. Upon moving to Istanbul, he started appearing in movies and TV series and also worked as a voice actor. For his role in the movie Mold in 2012, Biçer won the Best Supporting Actor award at the 49th Golden Orange Film Festival. In 2020, he had a recurring role in the Netflix original docudrama Rise of Empires: Ottoman.

== Filmography ==
Film
Title	Director	Year	Role
Yellow Letters	İlker Çatak	2026	Aziz
Dormitory	Nehir Tuna	2023	Father
Cici		2022	Tansu
Anadolu Leoparı	Emre Kayiş	2021	
Sardunya	Cağıl Bocut	2021	
Kerr		2021	Funural Service
Seni Buldum Ya		2021	Rıfat
Karakomik Filmler 2	Cem Yılmaz	2020	
Kronoloji		2019	
Yol Kenarı		2017	
Kırık Kalpler Bankası	Onur Ünlü	2016	
Neden Tarkovski Olamıyorum		2015	Bahadır
Pek Yakında		2014	Man in shop
Toz Ruhu	Nesimi Yetik	2014	
İtirazım Var	Onur Ünlü	2014	
Yozgat Blues	Mahmut Fazıl Coşkun	2013	
Sen Aydınlatırsın Geceyi	Onur Ünlü	2013	
F Tipi film	Ezel Akay	2012	Gardiyan
Yük	Erden Kıral	2012	
Mold	Ali Aydın-Murat Tuncel	2012	Cemil
Celal Tan ve Ailesinin Aşırı Acıklı Hikayesi	Onur Ünlü	2011	Kamuran Tan
Jack Hunter and the Star of Heaven	Terry Cunningham	2009	Rahip
Kısa'ca Ramazan	Onur Ünlü	2009	
Beş Şehir	Onur Ünlü	2009	
Güz Sancısı	Tomris Giritlioğlu	2009	
Güneşin Oğlu	Onur Ünlü	2008	
Süt	Semih Kaplanoğlu	2008	Postman
Çocuk	Onur Ünlü	2007	Hamdi
Hacivat Karagöz Neden Öldürüldü?	Ezel Akay	2005	Misak
Gönül Yarası	Yavuz Turgul	2004	Hairdresser
Dişi Kuş		2004	
Short Film
Title	Director	Year	Role
Benden Korkmana Gerek Yok		2020	
Kamyon		2017	Besim
Nefes		2012	Man
İktidarsız		2012	
Kamil İnsan		2009	Kamil

Web series
Title	Year	Role	Note
Pera Palas'ta Gece Yarası	2022	Ahmet	
Saygı	2020		
Rise of Empires: Ottoman	2020	Orban	

Tv series
Title	Year	Role	Note
Şapkacı Kadınlar	2026-	Albay Sami	
Veliaht	2025-2026	Vezir Yılmaz	
Çukur	2019–2020	Yüzüklü/Yücel	
Ufak Tefek Cinayetler	2017-2018	Kemal	
Ölene Kadar	2017	Yılmaz Saner	
Analar ve Anneler	2015	Tahsin Tuğracı	
Beş Kardeş	2015		
Cinayet	2014	Kadir	
Şubat	2012	Saltuk	
Leyla ile Mecnun	2011	guest	
Muhteşem Yüzyıl	2011	Ahmed Çelebi	Guest Star
Kapalı Çarşı	2010		
Çok Özel Tim	2007		
Hırsız Polis	2005	Koray	
Her Şey Yolunda	2004	Eser	

== Awards ==
- 21st Golden Boll Film Festival, "Best Actor", Toz Ruhu - Nesimi Yetik - 2014
- 20th Golden Boll Film Festival, "Best Supporting Actor", Yozgat Blues - Mahmut Fazıl Coşkun - 2013
- 49th Golden Orange Film Festival, "Best Supporting Actor", Mold - Ali Aydın - 2012
- 16th Sadri Alışık Awards, "Best Supporting Actor", Beş Şehir - Onur Ünlü - 2011
- 29th International Istanbul Film Festival, "Best Actor", Beş Şehir - Onur Ünlü - 2010
- 46th Golden Orange Film Festival, "Behlül Dal Youth Talent Award", Beş Şehir - Onur Ünlü - 2009
