= Ertan Saban =

Turkish-Macedonian actor and screenwriter

- Born: 4 December 1977 (age 48); Skopje, SR Macedonia, SFR Yugoslavia
- Occupation: Actor
- Spouse(s): İnci Saban (died 2009) Ebru Özkan (m. 2016)
- Children: 1

Ertan Saban (born 4 December 1977) is an actor and screenwriter.

== Early life ==
He has dual Turkish Macedonian citizenships. He was born in Skopje, SR Macedonia, SFR Yugoslavia. He is of Turkish descent. His family is the one of Turk minority in Balkan. He can speak Istanbul dialect and Üsküp(Skopje) dialect which risk of getting lost in Turkish. Also, he is multilungial. He can speak Bulgarian, Bosnian, Macedonian, Serbian, Albanian, Greek, English, French.

He graduated from veterinary department for high school. Then, he studied pedagogy. He graduated from the Theater Department of the State Conservatory of Macedonia.

Saban married actress Ebru Özkan on 3 June 2016. The couple have a daughter named Biricik.

== Career ==
For many years, he performed on stage in various plays at the Macedonian Turkish Theater together with his brother, Erman Saban, Filiz Ahmet and Luran Ahmeti. Afterwards he worked in theater in France. He came to Turkey and started acting and directing in theater, series and films. His breakthrough role is "Alex" in hit historical series Elveda Rumeli about Turks in Macedonia when the Ottoman Empire collapsed.

He is the co-writer and actor of Limonata, directed by Ali Atay. He was starring with Ali Atay in comedy series Mutlu Ol Yeter, Şeref Bey and the crime series Kılıç Günü.

He portrayed Mustafa Kemal Atatürk in the movies Bir Cumhuriyet Şarkısı, Balkan Is Not Dead and in the commercial "İş Bankası" for three times. He portrayed Constantine XI in Mehmed: Bir Cihan Fatihi. He portrayed Robert Frew in Akif.

He starred in the TV series Gelsin Hayat Bildiği Gibi alongside Devrim Özkan and Özge Özberk. With Damla Sönmez, he played in Kötü Kan.

== Filmography ==
Movies
Title	Year	Note
Kako los son	2003	
Kako ubiv svetec	2004	
Kontakt	2005	
The Net 2.0	2006	
Gölgesizler	2008	
Başka Semtin Çocukları	2008	
Hayde Bre	2010	
Balkan Is Not Dead	2012	
Benimle Oynar mısın?	2013	
Limonata	2015	
Çiçero	2019	
Acı Kiraz	2020	
Kadınlara Mahsus	2023	
Barda 2	2024	
Bir Cumhuriyet Şarkısı	2024	

Web series
Title	Role	Year	Note
Büyük Sürgün: Kafkasya	Adult Ömer	2015–2016	
Pes Artık	Kapıcı	2020	
Şeref Bey	Luran	2021	
Yakamoz S-245	Umut	2022	
Dünya Bu	Kreatif	2023	
Akif	Robert Frew	2023	
Fer	Şadi Ulusoy	2025	
Persona	Yiğit Dağlı	2025	

TV series
Title	Role	Year	Note
Vo svetot na bajkite 2		2001	
Sedum prikazni za ljubovta i svrsuvanjeto		2003	
Sultan Makamı	Palyaço Refik	2003	
Azize	Levent	2004	
Savcının Karısı	Dursun	2005–2006	
Sağır Oda	Nogayhan Kırımlı	2006–2007	
Elveda Rumeli	Alex	2007–2009	
Kılıç Günü	Savaş Kızıltan	2010	
Karakol	Komiser Reşat	2011	
Bir Kadın Tanıdım	Umut	2011	
Sakarya-Fırat	Teo	2012–2013	
Görüş Günü Kadınları	Hayalet Ertan	2013	
Hatasız Kul Olmaz	Ferit	2015	
Mutlu Ol Yeter	Babür	2015	
Kurtlar Vadisi: Pusu	Gölge	2015–2016	
Mehmed: Bir Cihan Fatihi	Constantine XI	2018	
Avlu	Oğuz	2019	
Gel Dese Aşk	Barlas	2020	
Son Nefesime Kadar	Vedat	2022	
Gelsin Hayat Bildiği Gibi	Sadi Payaslı	2022–2023	
Kötü Kan	Kartal Karaoğlu	2024	
Deha	Karahan Doğan	2025	
Mehmed: Fetihler Sultanı	Vlad the Impaler	2025–2026	

Short film
Title	Role	Year	Note
Puppet Show	Thug in Bus	2000	

Music video
Title	Year
Malt - Deprem	2006
