= Ali Atay =

Turkish actor, musician, screenwriter and director

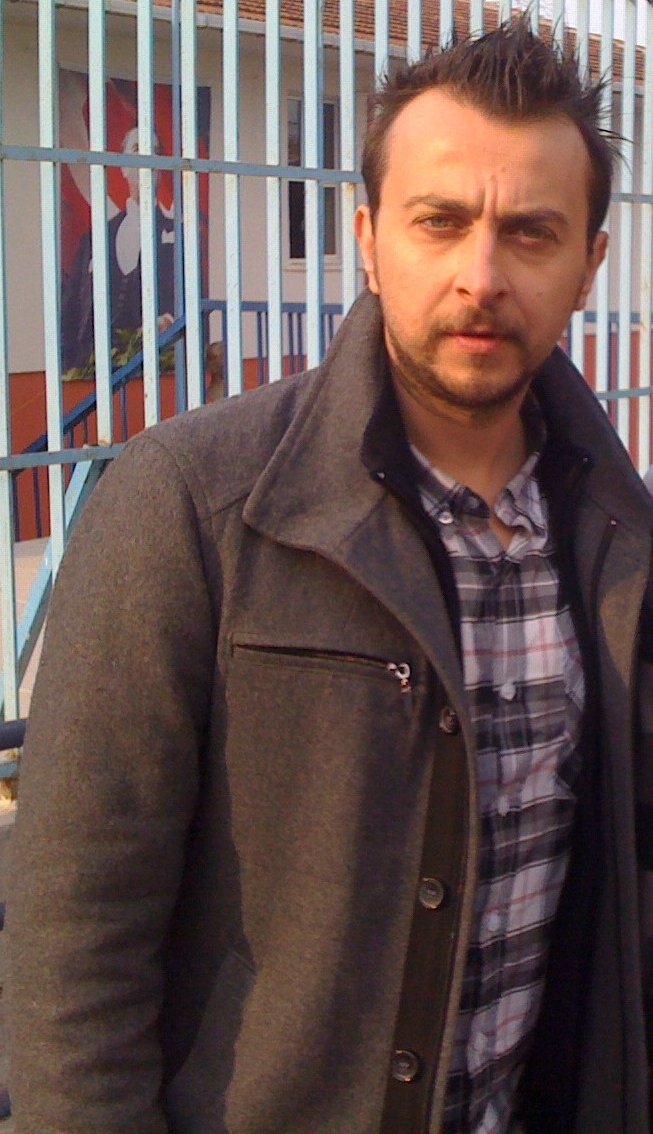
- Born: Dursun Ali Atay; 20 April 1976 (age 50); Rize, Turkey
- Education: Mimar Sinan Fine Arts University
- Occupations: Actor, singer, film Director
- Years active: 1999–present
- Spouses: Ebru Cansız (m. 2008; div. 2013) Hazal Kaya (m. 2019)
- Children: 2

Dursun Ali Atay (born 20 April 1976) is a Turkish actor, musician, screenwriter, and director.

== Life and career ==
He is of Laz descent from Rize. Atay graduated from the theatre department of Mimar Sinan Fine Arts University. He is best known for his role as Mecnun in the hit surreal comedy series Leyla ile Mecnun. He is the recipient of the Tribeca Best Actor Award. He has appeared in more than fifteen films and theatre plays since 1999.

He played in the surreal art house film "Sen Aydınlatırsın Geceyi" with Demet Evgar, Damla Sönmez, Ahmet Mümtaz Taylan, which was released at the Toronto International Film Festival. He later appeared in the film Ayla as Ali Astubay on Turkey's entry for the 90th Academy Awards. Atay then got lead role in the movie Nuh Tepesi.

Atay got a major role in the comedy series Mutlu Ol Yeter, alongside Aslı Enver, Öner Erkan and Ertan Saban. In 2017, he appeared portrayed the character of Commissioner Yusuf on BluTV's first online Turkish, series Masum. He shared the leading role with Haluk Bilginer, Nur Sürer and Okan Yalabık. He later played in the series "Son Yaz".

In June 2014, the shooting of his awarded movie, Limonata, began. The movie marked his first experience as a director and scenarist, and actors such as Serkan Keskin and Ertan Saban were cast in the leading roles. He directed and wrote the action-comedy films Ölümlü Dünya and "Ölümlü Dünya 2" which was released in 2018 and 2023. He directed and wrote in film "Cinayet Süsü". He wrote as production designer in series "Şeref Bey".

== Filmography ==
=== Director ===
- 2015 Limonata
- 2018 Ölümlü Dünya
- 2019 Cinayet Süsü
- 2023 Ölümlü Dünya 2

=== Screenwriter ===
- 2015 Limonata
- 2018 Ölümlü Dünya
- 2019 Cinayet Süsü
- 2023 Ölümlü Dünya 2

=== Production Designer ===
- Şeref Bey

=== Film ===
Year	Movie	Role	Note
2000	Artık Çok Geç	Kemal	
2004	Kırlangıç	Aşık Mağlubi	
2005	Çanta	İlhan	Short Film
2005	O Şimdi Mahkum	Yiğit Çiftgör	
2007	İyi Seneler Londra	Firuz	
2009	40	Metin	
2010	Vay Arkadaş	Manik	
2013	Sen Aydınlatırsın Geceyi	Cemal	
2017	Ayla	Ali	
2018	Nuh Tepesi	Ömer	
2019	Türk İşi Dondurma	Mehmet	

=== Web series ===
Year	Series	Role
2011–2023	Leyla ile Mecnun	Mecnun Çınar
2017	Masum	Yusuf
2024-2025	Anonim	Many Roles

=== TV series ===
Year	Series	Role
1998–2001	İkinci Bahar	Ersin
2000	Yedi Numara	Guest role
2003	Şapkadan Babam Çıktı	Maksut
2004	Çınaraltı	Serhan
2004	Çeşm-i Bülbül	Veli
2006	Cemile	Demir
2008	Eşref Saati	Sebati
2009	Yapma Diyorum	Aşık Mağlubi
2010	Kılıç Günü	Cenk Kızıltan
2013–2014	Ben de Özledim	Ali Atay
2015	Mutlu Ol Yeter	Can
2021	Son Yaz	Selim Kara

== Songs ==
Number	Song	Note
1	Falan Filan (Yalan)	duet with Ezgi Asaroğlu
2	Gitmek İstersen	
3	Eksik Bir Şey Mi Var?	
4	Vay Be	
5	Kolpa	duet with Serkan Keskin, Osman Sonant, Cengiz Bozkurt and Ahmet Mümtaz Taylan
6	Yokluğunda	Leyla The Band
7	Aşk Bitti	Leyla The Band
8	Belki(Şimdi Gitmek Vakti)	Leyla The Band
9	Ramazan	Leyla The Band
10	İster Gel İster Gelme	Leyla The Band
11	Of	Leyla The Band
12	Zaman	Leyla The Band
13	Umutsuzum	

=== Covers ===
Song	Note
Sevdalılar Beni anlar	
Doktor	
Bu Kıza Kadar	duet with Serkan Keskin and Osman Sonant
Gökte Yıldız Ay misun	duet with Serkan Keskin and Osman Sonant
Elindedir Bağlama	duet with Serkan Keskin and Osman Sonant
Beni Affet	
Sen de mi Leyla ?	
Ben de Özledim	duet with Serkan Keskin and Cengiz Bozkurt
İtirazım Var	duet with Serkan Keskin and Osman Sonant
Batsın Bu Dünya	duet with Serkan Keskin and Osman Sonant
Kalenin Bedenleri	duet with Serkan Keskin, Osman Sonant, Ahmet Mümtaz Taylan and Cengiz Bozkurt
Bu Gala Daşlı Gala	duet with Cengiz Bozkurt, Ahmet Mümtaz Taylan and Osman Sonant
