= Let's Sin =

- Film poster
- Original title: İtirazım Var
- Directed by: Onur Ünlü
- Starring: Serkan Keskin; Hazal Kaya
- Release date: 18 April 2014
- Running time: 110 minutes
- Country: Turkey
- Language: Turkish

Let's Sin (Turkish: İtirazım Var) is a 2014 Turkish action film directed by Onur Ünlü.

== Cast ==
- Serkan Keskin - Selman Bulut
- Hazal Kaya - Zeynep Bulut
- Öner Erkan - Gökhan
- Osman Sonant - Komiser Cihan Demir
- Büşra Pekin - Nebahat
- Umut Kurt - Efraim
- Serdar Orçin - Ferdi
