= Songül Öden =

Turkish actress (born 1979)

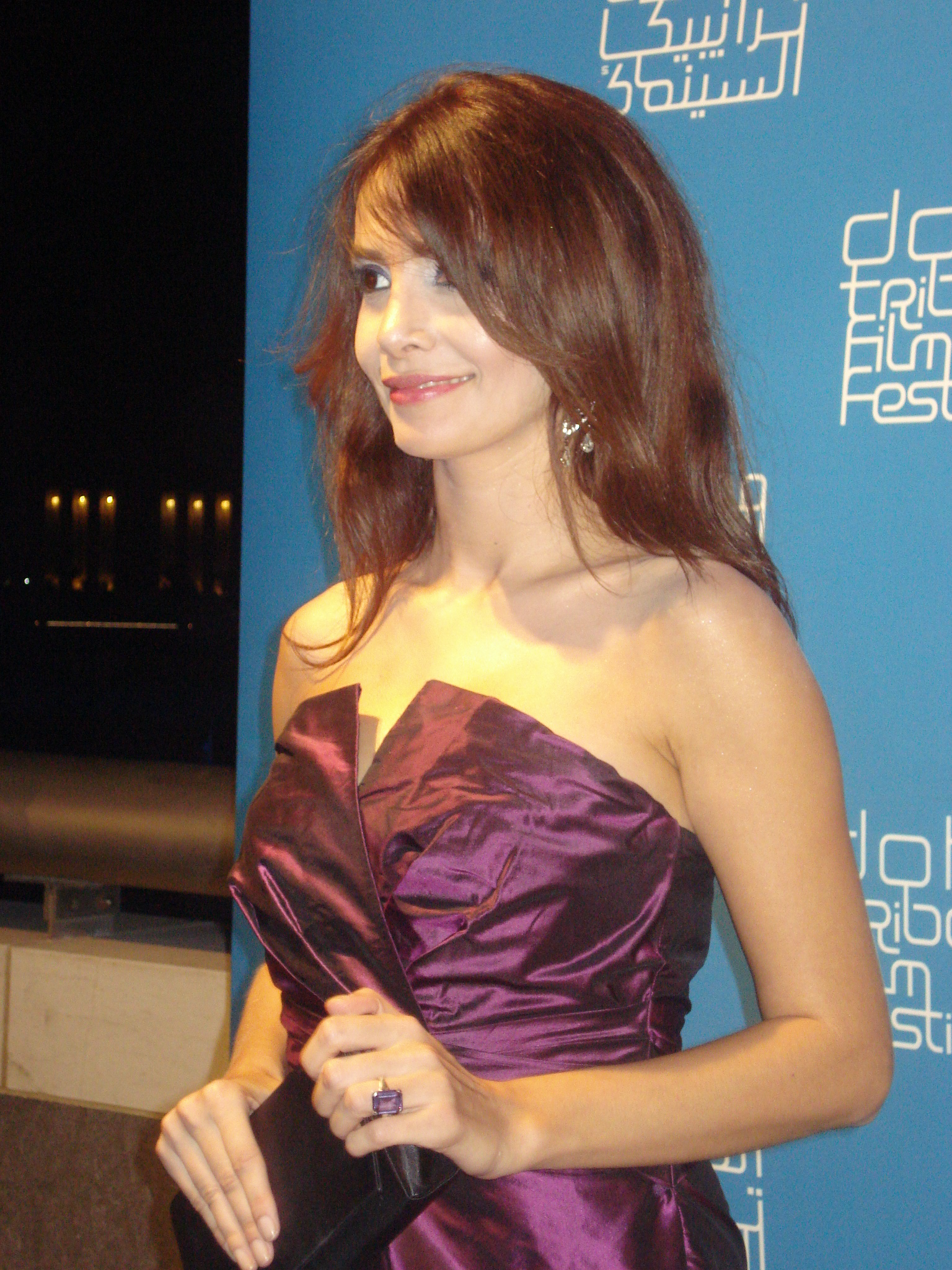
- Öden in 2009
- Born: 17 February 1979 (age 47); Diyarbakır, Turkey
- Occupation: Actress
- Years active: 1993–present
- Spouses: Canberk Uçucu (m. 2002; div. 2011) Arman Bıçakçı (m. 2020)
- Children: 1

Songül Öden (born 17 February 1979) is a Turkish actress of Zaza descent. Her most successful roles were in the series Gümüş where she played the lead character and in Umutsuz Ev Kadınları as the lead housewife Yasemin.

== Life and career ==
She spent her elementary school, high school and university years in Ankara. During high school days she attended the Ankara Arts Theatre and then in Hacettepe University she had part-time vocal training. She later graduated from Ankara University's theatre school. She was also a part of a project which was an adaptation of the poems of Atilla İlhan named Ne Kadınlar Sevdim with Enver Aysever as writer. After a while she left the state theatre and started to work in Istanbul in TV and theatre sector.

Songül has been acting on TV since 1999 when she did a TV series entitled Ferhunde Hanımlar. After that, she acted in five other TV series Vasiyet (2001), Havada Bulut (2002), Gümüş (2005–2007), Vazgeç Gönlüm (2008) and Mükemmel Çift (2010). After a project called Havada Bulut adapted from Sait Faik stories, she had a role in a television series drama called Gümüş where she acted side by side with Kıvanç Tatlıtuğ. The series lasted for 2 1/2 years and had a record as the most popular project in the Middle East, the Balkans and Turkey. She was presented with an honorary award with Kıvanç Tatlıtuğ at the Muscat Film Festival. She was also a guest of honour at the Cairo Film Festival.

In 2009, she acted in a movie called Acı Aşk which is written by Onur Ünlü and in 2011 she appeared in 72. Koğuş which is a work by Orhan Kemal. Acı Aşk ("Bitter Love") in which she co-stars with Halit Ergenç, Cansu Dere and Ezgi Asaroğlu is her first-ever cinematic performance and was released on 18 December 2009. She also appeared in the Egyptian TV series Underground as a guest actress.

Songül Öden returned to television in 2011 with the series Umutsuz Ev Kadınları adaptation of Desperate Housewives. She had leading role in "Bir Aile Hikayesi" adaptation of This is Us. With Haluk Bilginer, she played in "Şeref Bey" and "Uysallar".

Öden had been a part of a project in the Middle East about disapproval of women and child death in Palestine with eight world stars. In 2009 she was declared a Culture and Peace Envoy in Bulgaria.

== Filmography ==
Film
Year	Title	Role	Notes
2007	Sınır	Didem	Short film
2009	Acı Aşk	Ayşe	Leading role
2011	72. Koğuş	Meryem	Leading role
2016	Ekşi Elmalar	Türkan Özay	Leading role
2021	Beni Çok Sev	Nuriye	Leading role
2023	Atatürk 1881 - 1919	Zübeyde Hanım	Supporting role
Web Series
Year	Title	Role	Notes
2017	Fi	Yıldız Kolhan	Guest Appearance
2020	Şeref Bey	Neşe	Leading role
2022	Uysallar	Nil Uysal	Leading role
Television
Year	Title	Role	Notes
1999	Ferhunde Hanımlar		
2001	Vasiyet	Ruhinaz	
2002	Havada Bulut	Ayşe	
2005–2007	Gümüş	Gümüş Şadoğlu	Leading role
2008	Vazgeç Gönlüm	Ezra	
2010	Mükemmel Çift	Ayça	
2011–2014	Umutsuz Ev Kadınları	Yasemin Anday Kalyoncu	Leading role
2015	Serçe Sarayı	Serçe	Leading role
2017	Kayıtdışı	Zeynep	Leading role
2019	Bir Aile Hikayesi	Reyhan	Leading role
2022–	Oğlum	Zeynep Yalçın Kaya	Leading role

== Theatre ==
- Yerma (1993) - Ankara Deneme Stage
- Yasar Ne Yasar Ne Yasamaz (1999–2000) - Trabzon National Theatre
- Birimiz Hep Icin (1999–2000) - Trabzon National Theatre
- Dort Mevsim (2003–2004) - Diyarbakir National Theatre
- Hortlak (2003–2004) - Diyarbakir National Theatre
- Ne Kadinlar Sevdim (2003–2004) - Cisenti Theatre
- Kadinciklar (2007–2008) - Sadri Alisik Theatre
- Keşanlı Ali Destanı (2011) - Sadri Alisik Theatre
- Küçük Adam Ne Oldu Sana? (2012) - Sadri Alisik Theatre
- Kafkas Tebeşir Dairesi (2013) - Sadri Alisik Theatre

== Awards ==
- 2008 – 8. Lions Theatre Awards, "Best Lead Actress" (Kadinciklar)
- 2008 – Ismet Kuntay Theatre Awards, "Ismet Kuntay Incentive Award" (Kadinciklar)
- 2011 – Siyaset Magazine Awards, "Special Award of Year"
- 2012 – 18. Altın Objektif Ödül Töreni, "Best Comedy Actress" (Umutsuz Ev Kadınları)
- 2012 – MUSCAT FILM FESTIVAL , "HONOUR AWARD"
- 2012 – QUALITY OF MAGAZINES, ‘BEST ACTRESS AWARD’. (Umutsuz Ev Kadınları)
- 2012 – MGD 18. ALTIN OBJEKTİF AWARD, ‘BEST ACTRESS IN COMEDY TELEVISION SERIES’ (Umutsuz Ev Kadınları)
- 2013 – LIONS THEATRE AWARD, ‘BEST ACTRESS AWARD’ (KÜÇÜK ADAM NE OLDU SANA)
- 2017 – Okan University, "Best Cinema Actress" (Rüzgarda Salınan Nilüfer)
- 2017 – Uçan Süpürge 20, "International Women Movies Festival" "Special Award"
- 2017 – 22nd Sadri Alışık Awards, "Cinema Selection Board Special Award " (Ekşi Elmalar)
- 2017 – Bilkent University, "Best Actress"
- 2017 – Ankara Film Festival, "Best Actress" (Rüzgarda Salınan Nilüfer)
