= Leyla The Band =

Turkish rock band

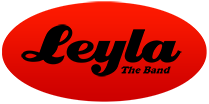

Background information
- Origin: Istanbul, Turkey
- Genres: Alternative rock
- Years active: March–September 2013
- Members: Ali Atay (vocals); Onur Ünlü (drums); Serkan Keskin (bass guitar); Osman Sonant (keyboard); Fırat İkisivri (guitar); Sarp Aydınoğlu (percussion); Sarper Aksoy (clarinet)

Leyla The Band is a Turkish rock band. Its formation was announced in March 2013 on the social media accounts for the TV series Leyla and Mecnun. The series' leading actor Ali Atay served as the main vocalist for the band. Other members included director Onur Ünlü on drums, Serkan Keskin on bass guitar, Osman Sonant on keyboard, Fırat İkisivri on guitar, Sarp Aydınoğlu on percussion and Sarper Aksoy on clarinet. The band's first song and musiv video "Yokluğunda" was first played during an episodes of Leyla and Mecnun and later uploaded on YouTube. The music video was viewed over 100 million times on YouTube and became one of the most viewed videos in Turkey in 2013. Their second song "Aşk Bitti" expanded their fan base. It was followed by a third song titled "Zaman".

The first concert of the group was held on 21 May 2013 in Jolly Joker Istanbul. The most crowded concert was held in Küçükçiftlik Park with 7 thousand people on 16 September 2013 under the slogan "Farewell to Leyla and Mecnun & Hello to I Miss Too". Serkan Keskin, one of the members of the group, explained that the group was disbanded because they did not intend to make money from music and the world of music was a very different world for them.
