= Serkan Keskin =

Turkish actor, director and musician (born 1977)

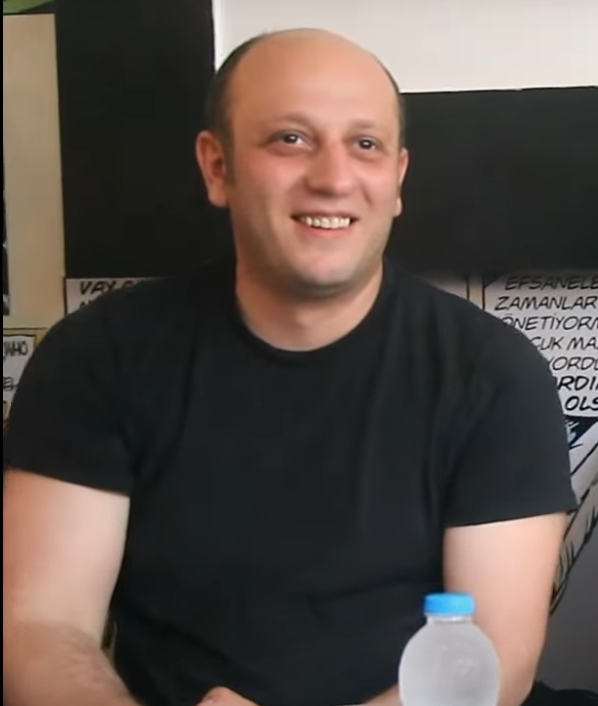
- Born: 25 November 1977 (age 48); İzmit, Turkey
- Occupation: Actor
- Years active: 1998–present
- Spouse: Meriç Aral (m. 2024)
- Children: 1

Serkan Keskin (born 25 November 1977) is a Turkish actor, director and musician. He is best known for his role as İsmail in hit surreal comedy series Leyla ile Mecnun and other awarded movies. He has appeared in more than thirty films since 2004.

== Theatre ==
=== As actor ===
- The Birds : Aristophanes – Semaver Kumpanya – 2014
- Scenes from an Execution : Howard Barker – Semaver Kumpanya – 2013
- Metot : Jordi Alceran – Semaver Kumpanya – 2012
- Titus Andronicus : William Shakespeare – Semaver Kumpanya – 2010
- L'Affaire de la rue de Lourcine : Eugène Labiche – Semaver Kumpanya – 2009
- Mother Courage and Her Children : Bertolt Brecht – Semaver Kumpanya – 2008
- Semaver ve Kumpanya : Sait Faik\Yavuz Peman – Semaver Kumpanya – 2007
- Chamaco : Abel Gonzales Melo – Semaver Kumpanya – 2006
- The Tempest : William Shakespeare – Semaver Kumpanya – 2006
- Süleyman ve Öbürsüler : Max Frisch\Yavuz Peman – Semaver Kumpanya – 2005
- Mucizeler Komedisi : Yavuz Turgul – MOS Yapım – 2004
- Murtaza : Orhan Kemal – Semaver Kumpanya – 2003
- Onikinci Gece : William Shakespeare – Semaver Kumpanya – 2002
- Nasrettin Hoca Bir Gün (children play) : Işıl Kasapoğlu – Semaver Kumpanya – 2002
- Pırtlatan Bal (children play) : Aziz Nesin – Semaver Kumpanya – 2002
- Bir Şehnaz Oyun : Turgut Özakman – İzmit Şehir Tiyatrosu – 2001
- The Miser : Molière – İzmit Şehir Tiyatrosu – 2000
- A Midsummer Night's Dream : William Shakespeare – İzmit Şehir Tiyatrosu – 1999
- Hakimiye Milliye Aşevi : Güngör Dilmen – 1998

=== As director ===
- Metot : Jordi Alceran – Semaver Kumpanya – 2012
- Resmi Geçit : Loula Anagnostaki – Semaver Kumpanya – 2008
- Deniz Kızı : Aylin Çalap – Semaver Kumpanya – 2003

== Filmography ==
Film
Title	Director	Year	Role
Ela ile Hilmi ve Ali		2023	
Bomboş		2022	Günel
Yılbaşı Gecesi	Ozan Açıktan	2022	
Hazine	Canbert Yergüz	2022	
Sen Ben Lenin	Tufan Taştan	2021	
Seni Buldum Ya		2021	Felek
Ben Bir Denizim	Umut Evirgen	2020	
Biz Böyleyiz	Caner Özyurtlu	2020	
Güzelliğin Portresi	Umur Turagay	2019	Oktay
Ahlat Ağacı	Nuri Bilge Ceylan	2019	
Kronoloji		2019	Ayhan
Güven		2018	Komiser
Kelebekler		2018	
Gerçek Kesit: Manyak		2018	
Cingöz Recai: Bir Efsanenin Dönüşü	Onur Ünlü	2017	Sadri
Tatlım Tatlım	Yılmaz Erdoğan	2017	
Rüzgarda Salınan Nilüfer		2016	Aybars
Tereddüt	Yeşim Ustaoğlu	2016	
Kırık Kalpler Bankası	Onur Ünlü	2016	
Yok Artık!	Caner Özyurtlu	2015	
Limonata	Ali Atay	2014	Selim
Silsile	Ozan Açıktan	2014	Cihan
İtirazım Var	Onur Ünlü	2014	Selman Bulut
Sen Aydınlatırsın Geceyi	Onur Ünlü	2013	Yasemin's boss
F Tipi Film	Grup Yorum	2012	
Yabancı	Filiz Alpgezmen	2012	
Yeraltı	Zeki Demirkubuz	2012	Tarık
Eylül	Cemil Ağacıkoğlu	2011	Namık
Av Mevsimi	Yavuz Turgul	2010	Forensic doctor
Unutma Beni İstanbul	Stefan Arsenijevic	2010	
Saç	Tayfun Pirselimoğlu	2010	
Takiye: Allah'ın Yolunda	Ben Verbong	2010	Kenan
Kosmos	Reha Erdem	2009	Coffee shop owner
Pus	Tayfun Pirselimoğlu	2009	
Vavien	Taylan Biraderler	2009	Süleyman's bouncer
11'e 10 Kala :	Pelin Esmer	2009	Librarian
Başka Semtin Çocukları	Aydın Bulut	2008	Engin
Güneşin Oğlu	Onur Ünlü	2008	Serkan
Sonbahar	Özcan Alper	2007	Mikail
Çinliler Geliyor	Serkan Keskin	2006	Asım
Şaşkın	Şahin Alparslan	2005	Recai
Kalbin Zamanı	Ali Özgentürk	2004	Tonguç
Gönül Yarası	Yavuz Turgul	2004	Taxi driver
Korkuyorum Anne	Reha Erdem	2004	
Tramvay	Olgun Arun	2004	

Short film
Title	Year	Role	Note
Cemil Show	2015	Temizlikçi	
The Last Schnitzel	2017	Molla Haşim	
Söz Uçar	2017		
Kamyon	2017	Police	
Fishbone	2017	Client	
Taş	2019		

Web series
Title	Year	Role	Note
Metot	2021	Ferhat	
Ya İstiklal Ya Ölüm	2020		
Jet Sosyete	2019	Serdar	Guest
Masum	2017	Taner	
Leyla ile Mecnun	2011–2023	İsmail	
Behzat Ç "Bir Ankara Polisiyesi	2011	İsmail	Guest

TV series
Title	Director	Year	Role
Şahane Hayatım		2023	Niyazi Adalı
Mucize Doktor	Yağız Alp Akaydın	2021	Muhsin Korunmaz
Öğretmen	Koray Kerimoğlu	2020	Yılmaz
Bir Aile Hikayesi	Merve Girgin Aydemir	2019	Ufuk Damar
Muhteşem Yüzyıl: Kösem		2017	Nef'i
Hayat Şarkısı	Cem Karcı	2017	Taner (54-57)
Beş Kardeş	Onur Ünlü	2015	Sait Başeğmez
Ben de Özledim	Onur Ünlü	2013–2014	Serkan Keskin
Şubat	Volkan Kocatürk	2013	Gerçek Samim Akça
Gönülçelen	Cevdet Mercan	2010	
Deli Saraylı	Aydın Bulut	2010	Mazhar Kazancı
Ey Aşk Nerdesin		2009	Ferhat
Bu Kalp Seni Unutur mu? :	Aydın Bulut	2009	İdris
Mert İle Gert	Hakan Algül	2008	Bahri
Avrupa Yakası	Jale Atabey	2008	Yavrum Mithat (guest)
Derdest	Onur Tan	2008	Okan Taşkın
Bıçak Sırtı	Selim Demirdelen	2007	
Hırsız Polis	Türkan Derya	2005	Bünyamin
Sevinçli Haller		2004	
Çaylak	Nihat Durak	2003	

=== Dubbing ===
- Baba : voice-over – 2022 -narrator

== Songs ==
Chronoginal	Song	Note
1	Bu Kıza Kadar	duet with Ali Atay and Osman Sonant
2	Kolpa	duet with Ali Atay, Osman Sonant, Ahmet Mümtaz Taylan and Cengiz Bozkurt
3	Gökte Yıldız Ay misun	duet with Ali Atay and Osman Sonant
4	Elindedir Bağlama	duet with Ali Atay and Osman Sonant
5	Kim Bilir ?	
6	Ben de özledim ben de	duet with Ali Atay and Cengiz Bozkurt
7	İtirazım Var	duet with Ali Atay and Osman Sonant
8	Batsın Bu Dünya	duet with Ali Atay and Osman Sonant
9	Duvardaki Resmin	
10	Kalenin Bedelleri	duet with Ali Atay, Osman Sonant, Ahmet Mümtaz Taylan and Cengiz Bozkurt
11	Yokluğunda	Leyla The Band
12	Aşk Bitti	Leyla The Band

== Awards ==
- 2015 – 20th Sadri Alışık Cinema Awards, "Most Successful Drama Actor" (İtirazım Var)
- 51st Golden Orange Film Festival, Best Actor, İtirazım Var, 2014
- 21st Golden Cocoon Film Festival, Best Supporting Actor, Silsile, 2014
- 32nd İsmail Dümbüllü Awards – 2012
