= Güven (disambiguation) =

Güven is a Turkish unisex given name.

Güven may also refer to:

- Güven, Düzce, a village in Turkey
- Güven, Midyat, a village in Turkey
- Güven Park, an urban public park located in Ankara, Turkey
