= Osman Sonant =

Turkish actor

- Born: 1 March 1979 (age 46); Istanbul, Turkey
- Occupation(s): Actor, musician
- Years active: 2003–present

Osman Sonant (born 1 March 1979) is a Turkish actor.

He started his career in 1997 at Bahçelievler Municipal Theatre and was trained by Yılmaz Gruda. In 1998, he continued his career at Ortaoyuncular Nöbetçi Theatre run by Ferhan Şensoy and the next year he enrolled in Istanbul University State Conservatory and eventually graduated with a degree in stage arts studies. After appearing in various plays, movies and TV series, in 2009 he received the Best Supporting Actor award at the 16th Golden Boll Film Festival for his role in Pandora'nın Kutusu.

Since 2011, He is playing the character of Yavuz in the hit surreal comedy series Leyla ile Mecnun. In 2015, he had a leading role in Onur Ünlü's Beş Kardeş series, portraying the character of Orhan. Sonant has also appeared in the psychological thriller TV series Fi and in 2020 had a leading role in the Netflix historical docudrama Rise of Empires: Ottoman.

== Filmography ==
Television
Year	Title	Role	Notes
2001	Yılan Hikayesi	Police officer	
2008	Annem		
2010	Türk Malı	Suphi / Süpo	
2011	Behzat Ç. Bir Ankara Polisiyesi	Yavuz	Guest
2011–2013	Leyla ile Mecnun	Yavuz	
2013–2014	Ben de Özledim	Himself	
2015	Beş Kardeş	Orhan	
2018–2019	Ufak Tefek Cinayetler	Kerim Adil Sağlam	
2019	Zengin ve Yoksul	Aziz Erdemli	
2020	Uyanış: Büyük Selçuklu	Andreas	
Streaming series
Year	Title	Role	Notes
2017	Fi	Sadık Murat Kolhan	
2017	Görünen Adam	İsfendiyar	
2020	Rise of Empires: Ottoman	Loukas Notaras	
2020	Ya İstiklal Ya Ölüm	Ali Fuat Cebesoy	
2021–2023	Leyla ile Mecnun	Yavuz	
2022	Sıcak Kafa	Murat Siyavuş	
Film
Year	Title	Role	Notes
2006	Kurtlar Vadisi Irak	American Sergeant	
2008	Pandora'nın Kutusu	Mehmet	
2010	Ustalar, Alimler ve Sultanlar	Mehmed II	documentary
2011	Yangın Var	Koşman	
2014	İtirazım Var	Cihan Demir	
2015	Kırık Kalpler Bankası	Ece	
2016	Memleket	Kıney	
2016	Son Takla	Cemil	
2016	Yolsuzlar Çetesi		
2016	91.1	Soner's brother	
2016	Lütfi	Salih	Short film
2019	Bir Aşk İki Hayat	Sadi Yaşar	

== Theatre ==
- Anna Karenina : Leo Tolstoy - Kent Oyuncuları - 2006
- The Night Season : Rebecca Lenkiewicz - Kent Oyuncuları - 2005
- Hamlet : William Shakespeare - Istanbul City Theatre - 2003

== Discography ==
#	Song	Notes
1	Bu Kıza Kadar	duet with Ali Atay and Serkan Keskin
2	Kolpa	duet with Ali Atay, Serkan Keskin, Ahmet Mümtaz Taylan and Cengiz Bozkurt
3	Gökte Yıldız Ay misun	duet with Ali Atay and Serkan Keskin
4	Elindedir Bağlama	duet with Ali Atay and Serkan Keskin
5	Yeniden	
6	İtirazım Var	duet with Ali Atay and Serkan Keskin
7	Batsın Bu Dünya	duet with Ali Atay and Serkan Keskin
8	Ağla Gözüm	
9	Kalenin Bedenleri	duet with Ali Atay, Serkan Keskin, Ahmet Mümtaz Taylan and Cengiz Bozkurt
10	Yokluğunda	Leyla The Band
11	Aşk Bitti	Leyla The Band
12	Çaldı Çaldı	Beş Kardeş series soundtrack
13	Ben Aşık Oldum	Beş Kardeş series soundtrack

== Awards ==
- 23rd Ankara International Film Festival, "Best Actor" (Yangın Var) - 2012
- 16th Golden Boll Film Festival, "Best Supporting Actor" (Pandora'nın Kutusu) - 2009
