= Muhammet Uzuner =

Turkish actor (born 1965)

- Born: 30 June 1965 (age 60); Samsun, Turkey
- Occupation: Actor
- Years active: 1993–present
- Spouse: Arzu Gamze Kılınç

Muhammet Uzuner (born 30 June 1965) is a Turkish actor. He is best known for his performance as Doctor Cemal in Once Upon a Time in Anatolia.

== Filmography ==
=== Television ===
Year	Title	Role	Notlar
2001	Tatlı Hayat		
2001–2002	Dadı	Şöhret Şöhretli	
2002	Aslı ile Kerem		
2002	Berivan	Kemal	Miniseries
2003	Şıh Senem		
2004	Perçem	Archeologist - Levent	
2004	Büyük Yalan	Koray Soytürk	
2005	Ateşli Topraklar	İsmail Bozdağlı	Miniseries
2007	Bıçak Sırtı	Dr. Zafer Güven	
2008	Rüzgâr	Hilmi	
2008	Gece Gündüz		
2009	Binbir Gece	Commissioner Turgut	
2009	Parmaklıklar Ardında	Head guard Kemal	
2011	Kalbim Seni Seçti	Onur	
2012	Koyu Kırmızı	Mahir Güzey	
2012–2013	Öyle Bir Geçer Zaman ki	Arif Yücel	
2013-2014	Saklı Kalan	Murat Cevher	
2015	Muhteşem Yüzyıl: Kösem	Aziz Mahmud Hüdayi	
2017	Seven Ne Yapmaz	Orhan Ekinsoy	Miniseries
2017–2018	Siyah Beyaz Aşk	Namık Emirhan	
2021	Elbet Bir Gün	Yavuz Kaplan	
2023–	Bir Derdim Var		

=== Film ===
Year	Title	Role	Notes
2007	Münferit	Deputy inspector	
2011	Görünmeyen	Ekrem	
2011	Bir Zamanlar Anadolu'da	Doctor Cemal	
2011	Yurt		
2012	Mold	Murat	
2013	Amok Koşucusu	Baba	Short film
2015	Kocan Kadar Konuş	Yazar "O"	
2015	Dolanma	Kemal	
2015	Light Years	Dee	
2015	The Jungle	Dündar	Short film
2016	Kocan Kadar Konuş: Diriliş	Yazar "O"	
2017	Beginner	Jön	
2017	Taş	Baba	
2018	Halef	Mahir	
2018	Yücel'in Çiçekleri	İsmail Hakkı Tonguç	

=== Streaming ===
Year	Title	Role	Platform	Notes
2020	Gün On4	Gazanfer	puhutv	TV series
2021	Saygı	Abdulkadir Yıldıray	BluTV	TV series
2021	Yeşilçam	Ekrem Haznedaroğlu	BluTV	TV series
2021	Terapist	Çetin	GAİN	TV series
2022	Kuş Uçuşu	Faruk	Netflix	TV series, guest appearance
