= 29th International Istanbul Film Festival =

- Festival Poster
- Location: Istanbul, Turkey
- Awards: Golden Tulip
- Festival date: April 3–18, 2010
- Website: http://www.iksv.org/film/english/

Istanbul Film Festival
- 30th 28th

The 29th International Istanbul Film Festival (Turkish: 29. Uluslararası İstanbul Film Festivali) was a film festival held in Istanbul, Turkey, which ran from April 3 to 18, 2010. More than 200 films were screened in 23 categories at seven movie theatres including Atlas, Rüya, Beyoğlu, Sinepop, Pera Museum theaters in Beyoğlu, the Kadıköy theater in Kadıköy and the Nişantaşı CityLife Cinema (City's).

This edition of the Istanbul International Film Festival, which was founded in 1984 and is organized by the Istanbul Foundation for Culture and Arts (İKSV) and accredited by FIAPF, opened with a gala on April 2, 2010, presented by actress Ceyda Düvenci and actor Yetkin Dikinciler at the Lütfi Kırdar Congress Exhibition Hall, followed by a screening of Le Concert by Romanian-French director Radu Mihaileanu.

== Awards ==
=== Lifetime Achievement Award ===
- Italian filmmaker Marco Bellocchio

=== Honorary Cinema Awards ===
- Turkish actor Kadir İnanır
- Turkish film editor Mevlüt Koçak
- Turkish director and actor Feyzi Tuna

=== International Golden Tulip Competition ===
- Golden Tulip (in memory of Şakir Eczacıbaşı): The Misfortunates directed by Felix Van Groeningen
- Special Jury Prize: Sandrine Kiberlain for Mademoiselle Chambon

=== National Golden Tulip Competition ===
- Golden Tulip Best Film Award: Vavien directed by Yağmur & Durul Taylan
- Best Director Award: Miraz Bezar for Min Dît: The Children of Diyarbakır (Kurdish: Min Dît / Turkish: Ben Gördüm)
- Best Actress Award: Şenay Orak for Min Dît: The Children of Diyarbakır (Kurdish: Min Dît / Turkish: Ben Gördüm)
- Best Actor Award: Tansu Biçer for Five Cities (Turkish: Beş Şehir)
- Best Screenplay Award: Engin Günaydın for Vavien
- Best Cinematography Award: Barış Özbiçer for Honey (Turkish: Bal)
- Best Music Award: Mustafa Biber for Min Dît: The Children of Diyarbakır (Kurdish: Min Dît / Turkish: Ben Gördüm)
- Special Jury Prize: Honey (Turkish: Bal) directed by Semih Kaplanoğlu

=== The Council of Europe Film Awards ===
- Face Award: Ajami directed by Scandar Copti and Yaron Shani
- Special Jury Prize: The Day God Walked Away directed by Philippe Van Leeuw

=== International Film Critics Association (FIPRESCI) Prizes ===
- International Competition Prize: Mademoiselle Chambon directed by Stéphane Brizé
- National Competition Prize (in memory of Onat Kutlar): Vavien directed by Yağmur & Durul Taylan

=== People's Choice Awards ===
- International Competition Award: I Killed My Mother (French: J'ai tué ma mère) directed by Xavier Dolan
- National Competition Award: Honey (Turkish: Bal) directed by Semih Kaplanoğlu

== National programmes ==
=== National competition ===
- Min Dît: The Children of Diyarbakır (Kurdish: Min Dît / Turkish: Ben Gördüm) directed by Miraz Bezar
- Brought by the Sea (Turkish: Denizden Gelen) directed by Nesli Çölgeçen
- Envy (Turkish: Kıskanmak) directed by Zeki Demirkubuz
- Love, Bitter (Turkish: Acı Aşk) directed by A. Taner Elhan
- Jolly Life (Turkish: Neşeli Hayat) directed by Yılmaz Erdoğan
- In Darkness (Turkish: Karanlıktakiler) directed by Çağan Irmak
- A Step into the Darkness (Turkish: Büyük Oyun) directed by Atıl İnaç
- Honey (Turkish: Bal) directed by Semih Kaplanoğlu
- Vavien directed by Yağmur & Durul Taylan
- The Voice (Turkish: Ses) directed by Ümit Ünal
- Five Cities (Turkish: Beş Şehir) directed by Onur Ünlü

== See also ==
- 2010 in film
- Turkish films of 2010
