= Suleyman Dilbirligi =

Turkish sergeant

Süleyman Dilbirliği (December 31, 1925 – December 7, 2017) was a retired Turkish soldier with the rank of a sergeant officer. He was a veteran of the Korean War. His story with Eunja Kim, a 5-year-old girl he adopted and named Ayla, who had lost her family in the war, was the subject of the 2017 Turkish-South Korean film "Ayla: The Daughter of War".

== Military career and personal life ==
Dilbirligi went to the Korean War in 1950. There, he found a girl whose parents had been killed, whom he named Ayla, and he considered her his own daughter. He intended to bring Ayla to Turkey. However, legal and political rules about adopting war orphans made it impossible for Dilbirgi to adopt Ayla. So, he was forced to leave her in an orphanage.

Sixty years after the Korean War, Suleyman Dilbirligi and Ayla met in Ankara Park in Seoul, the capital of South Korea. This 2010 reunion was the focus of the MBC documentary Kore Ayla, which later inspired the 2017 feature film Ayla: The Daughter of War.

He died on 7 December 2017 at the age of 91 in Haydarpaşa Numune Training and Research Hospital due to multiple organ failure.

== In popular culture ==
- In the 2017 Turkish-South Korean film Ayla: The Daughter of War, he was portrayed by İsmail Hacıoğlu and Çetin Tekindor.

== See also ==
- Ayla: The Daughter of War
- The Korean War
