= Limonata =

- Directed by: Ali Atay
- Starring: Ertan Saban; Serkan Keskin
- Release date: 13 April 2015 (IIFF)
- Running time: 110 minutes
- Country: Turkey
- Language: Turkish

Limonata is a 2015 Turkish comedy film directed by Ali Atay. Part of this story takes place as a road movie from Macedonia to Istanbul and back. This is the story of how two brothers who are initially strangers come to know one another.

== Plot ==
Middle-aged Sakip goes in search of his half-brother Selim, whom he hadn't known existed until Sakip's father, Suat, at his death bed, asks Sakip to go and get him. He drives from Macedonia to Istanbul, then after many adventures searching for Selim, eventually succeeds in finding him. Then there is the attempt to convince Selim to go and see his long-lost father before he dies, how he finally ends up in the car, and the long drive back from Istanbul, through Turkey and Bulgaria to Macedonia.

== Cast ==
- Ertan Saban – Sakip
- Serkan Keskin – Selim
- Luran Ahmeti – Fuat, Sakip's uncle
- Funda Eryigit – Nihal, Sakip's (cousin?)
- Bedija Begovska – Sakip's mother
- Zekir Sipahi – Suat, Sakip's father
- Ciguli – Tyre repair shop keeper
- Selahattin Bilal – Ali Riza, former smuggler turned imam
- Deniz Abdula – Bulgarian showman
- Ömer Lekesiz – Assistant Coach or Team Sponsor
