= Ayla: The Daughter of War =

2017 film

- Turkish theatrical release poster
- Directed by: Can Ulkay
- Written by: Yiğit Güralp
- Produced by: Çağlar Ercan; Christopher HK Lee; Evrim Sanal; Ayşe İlker Turgut; Mustafa Uslu
- Starring: Çetin Tekindor; İsmail Hacıoğlu; Kim Seol; Ali Atay; Damla Sönmez; Murat Yıldırım
- Cinematography: Jean-Paul Seresin
- Edited by: Mustafa Presheva
- Music by: Fahir Atakoglu
- Production company: Dijital Sanatlar Production
- Distributed by: Warner Bros. Pictures (Turkey)
- Release dates: 27 October 2017 (Turkey); 21 June 2018 (South Korea)
- Running time: 124 minutes
- Countries: Turkey; South Korea
- Languages: Turkish; Korean; English
- Box office: $16.2 million

Ayla: The Daughter of War (Turkish: Ayla; Korean: 아일라) is a 2017 Turkish-South Korean drama film directed by Can Ulkay. The movie set in Korean war period, tells the story of Sergeant Süleyman Dilbirliği who helps a little girl he names Ayla during the war.

== Plot ==
Turkey sends a brigade to South Korea as a result of the call for help made by the United Nations when North Korea invaded South Korea in 1950. Sergeant Süleyman, one of the soldiers in the brigade, finds a little girl whose mother and father were murdered on the battlefield. Sergeant Süleyman gives her the nickname Ayla because he found her in the moonlight. The two form a friendship despite the language barrier between them, but are torn apart when Süleyman had to return home.

== Cast ==
- Çetin Tekindor as Sergeant Süleyman Dilbirliği
  - İsmail Hacıoğlu as young Sergeant Süleyman
- Lee Kyung-jin as Ayla
  - Kim Seol as child Ayla
- Ali Atay as Ali
- Damla Sönmez as Nuran
- Murat Yıldırım as Lieutenant Mesut
- Claudia "Memory Monroe" as Marilyn Monroe
- Eric Roberts as Maj. Gen. Coulter

== Production ==
Ayla is based on the true story of Kim Eun-ja and Süleyman Dilbirliği, whose real-life reunion was shown in the 2010 Munhwa Broadcasting Corporation documentary Kore Ayla directed by Chuncheon MBC. In casting held in South Korea in 2016, child actress Kim Seol, who had previously played the role of Jin-ju in the popular South Korean television series Reply 1988, was chosen for the role of young Ayla. Ko Eun-min played the role of young Ayla's mother.

Filming began in 2016. The film was sponsored by Turkish Airlines, with support from Turkey's Ministry of Culture and Tourism. Most of the filming was carried out in Turkey. Filming in Turkey was completed in June 2017. The first screening of the movie was held on 11 September 2017 within the scope of the Toronto International Film Festival. The film was released on 27 October 2017 in Turkey and 21 June 2018 in South Korea.

== Reception ==
The movie was selected as the Turkish entry for the Best Foreign Language Film at the 90th Academy Awards, but it was not nominated.

== See also ==
- List of submissions to the 90th Academy Awards for Best Foreign Language Film
- List of Turkish submissions for the Academy Award for Best Foreign Language Film
- List of South Korean submissions for the Academy Award for Best Foreign Language Film
