= Mold (film) =

- Directed by: Ali Aydın
- Screenplay by: Ali Aydın
- Starring: Ercan Kesal; Muhammet Uzuner
- Cinematography: Murat Tuncel
- Edited by: Ahmet Boyacioglu; Ayhan Ergürsel
- Release date: 2012
- Running time: 94 minutes
- Language: Turkish

Mold (Turkish: Küf) is a 2012 Turkish-German drama film written and directed by Ali Aydın, in his feature film debut. It premiered in the Venice International Film Critics' Week sidebar of the 69th Venice International Film Festival, in which Aydın won the Lion of the Future. It later won the Silver Alexander award at Thessaloniki Film Festival, and the Golden Apple award at the Frankfurt Turkish Film Festival.

== Cast ==
- Ercan Kesal as Basri
- Muhammet Uzuner as Police Commissioner
- Tansu Biçer as Cemil
- Ali Çoban as Apo
- Cengiz Şahin as Salih
