= Köksal Engür =

Turkish actor (1946–2023

- Born: İsmail Köksal Engür; 5 March 1946; Kars, Turkey
- Died: 26 March 2023 (aged 77); Istanbul, Turkey
- Occupation: Actor
- Spouse: Jale Engür (m. 1976; div. 2017)

İsmail Köksal Engür (5 March 1946 – 26 March 2023) was a Turkish actor and voice actor, whose career spanned over six decades.

== Life and career ==
Born in Kars, Engür started his career as a child actor in 1956, and got his first personal success starring in the children TV show Oyun Treni. Graduated from the Department of Theatre of the Ankara University, he was active on stage, films, radio and television, and among his best known roles were Ak Sakallı Dede in the series Leyla and Mecnun, and Ali Osman in the film Oflu Hoca'nın Şifresi and in its sequel. Also a dubber, among the actors he lent his voice were Robert De Niro, Dustin Hoffman, Al Pacino, Rodger Bumpass, and Robin Williams.

== Death ==
Engür died of kidney failure on 26 March 2023, at the age of 77.
