= Five Cities =

- Theatrical poster
- Directed by: Onur Ünlü
- Written by: Onur Ünlü
- Produced by: Funda Alp; Onur Ünlü
- Starring: Ahmet Rıfat Sungar; Ege Tanman; Şebnem Sönmez; Bülent Emin Yarar; İpek Erdem; Beste Bereket; Tansu Biçer
- Cinematography: Eyüp Boz
- Production company: Eflatun Film
- Distributed by: Tiglon Film
- Release date: 9 April 2010
- Running time: 87 minutes
- Country: Turkey
- Language: Turkish
- Box office: $16,329

Five Cities (Turkish: Beş Şehir) is a 2010 Turkish drama film, written, produced and directed by Onur Ünlü, about a young policeman just arrived in Istanbul who falls in love with a woman in a candy shop. The film, which went on nationwide general release across Turkey on April 9, 2010, won awards at film festivals in Antalya and Istanbul and has been described as, an absurd poetic tale of five seemingly unrelated people’s lives.

== Synopsis ==
Aydın is a policeman recently appointed to a new post in Istanbul. While trying to get used to life in the big city, Aydın stumbles upon Mehtap, a young woman who works at a candy shop in Beyoğlu, and he falls for her. But there is no way that Aydın can make Mehtap realize that he even exists, just as Şevket, a young man who has dropped out of law school before starting to sell toy trains on the streets to make a living, cannot make Dilek, another girl who works at the same store, realize his feelings for her. When Dilek and Aydın meet, Aydın diverts his uncontrollable feelings toward Dilek.

== Release ==
=== General Release ===
The film opened on general release in ten screens across Turkey on April 9, 2010 at number twenty-seven in the Turkish box office chart with an opening weekend gross of US$4,728.

=== Festival Screenings ===
- 46th Antalya Golden Orange Film Festival (October 10–17, 2009)
- 29th International Istanbul Film Festival (April 3–18, 2010)

== Reception ==
=== Box Office ===
The film was in the Turkish box office charts for four weeks and has made a total gross of US$16,329.

=== Reviews ===
Emine Yıdırım, writing in Today's Zaman, describes the film as, an ensemble cast piece of intertwined stories of the Robert Altman School. The same publication has also described the film as absurd poetic tale of five seemingly unrelated people's lives intertwining in a most interesting way.

=== Awards ===
- 46th Antalya Golden Orange Film Festival Best Screenplay Award: Onur Ünlü (won)
- 29th International Istanbul Film Festival Best Actor Award: Tansu Biçer (won)

== See also ==
- 2010 in film
- Turkish films of 2010
