= Müge Boz =

Turkish actress (born 1984)

- Born: 13 April 1984 (age 40); Istanbul, Turkey
- Occupation(s): Actress, model
- Spouse: Caner Erdeniz (m. 2019)
- Children: 2

Müge Boz (born 13 April 1984) is a Turkish actress and model. She is best known for the hit surreal comedy series Leyla ile Mecnun and the film Karaoğlan based on the historical comic book. She played supporting roles in popular series Arka Sokaklar, Melekler Korusun, Yalan Dünya, and Muhteşem Yüzyıl: Kösem.

== Life and career ==
Boz's mother is a Bosniak Yugoslavian immigrant She has a sister. She spent her childhood in Istanbul, but at the age of 12 she moved with her family to Karşıyaka in İzmir due to her father's job demands.

Boz graduated from İzmir Atatürk High School. Then she finished her studies at Anadolu University with a degree in Cinema, TV and Public Relations studies. She subsequently received a scholarship from the school named Hogskulen i Volda in Norway and received 'strategic design' and 'digital photography' training afterwards. She studied ballet for 11 years and piano for 4 years.

In 2009, she appeared in a commercial for Turkcell and the following year she was cast in commercials for Arçelik, Maximum Kart and Nescafe. In 2011, she played the character of Meltem in the series Şüphe and Ada in the series Karakol.Aside from her acting career she has also practiced modelling. In 2010, she was chosen as the advertising face for Zen Diamonds. She has done fashion shoots for magazines such as Vogue, Tempo, Marie Claire, Women's Health and Instyle.

A breakthrough in her career came with her role in hit surreal comedy series Leyla ile Mecnun. She then had a role in TRT 1 series Gurbette Aşk. She then starred in the series Kayıtdışı, which aired on FOX in 2017.

== Filmography ==
=== Series ===
Year	Title	Role	Type	Position
2008	Melekler Korusun	Çiğdem	TV series	Actress
2011	Şüphe	Meltem Kutlu	TV series	Actress
2011	Karakol-Herkes Adalet İster	Ada	TV series	Actress
2012	Leyla ile Mecnun	Şirin / Leyla	TV series	Actress
2013	Gurbette Aşk Bir Yastıkta	Nina	TV series	Actress
2013	Yalan Dünya	Oya	TV series	Actress
2013	Aşk Emek İster	Leyla	TV series	Actress
2014–2015	Arka Sokaklar	Ece Dündar	TV series	Actress
2016	Sevda Kuşun Kanadında	Işık	TV series	Actress
2017	Muhteşem Yüzyıl: Kösem	Hümaşah Sultan	TV series	Actress
2017	Kayıtdışı	İdil	TV series	Actress
2021	Akıncı	Beste	TV series	Actress

=== Films ===
Year	Title	Role	Type	Position
2011	Toprağın Çocukları	Karika	Film	Actress
2012	Bir Hikayem Var	Yağmur	Film	Actress
2012	Karaoğlan	Bayır Gülü	Film	Actress
2013	Bu İşte Bir Yalnızlık Var	Zeynep	Film	Actress
2018	Nezih Bir Film	Safure	Film	Actress
2019	Çat Kapı Aşk	Su	Film	Actress
2019	Geçmiş Olsun	Tuğba	Film	Actress

=== Programming ===
Year	Title	Note
2017	Hadi	
2024	Müge ile TV Dergisi	
