= Ciguli =

Bulgarian musical artist (1957–2014)

Ciguli Ангел Йорданов Капсов
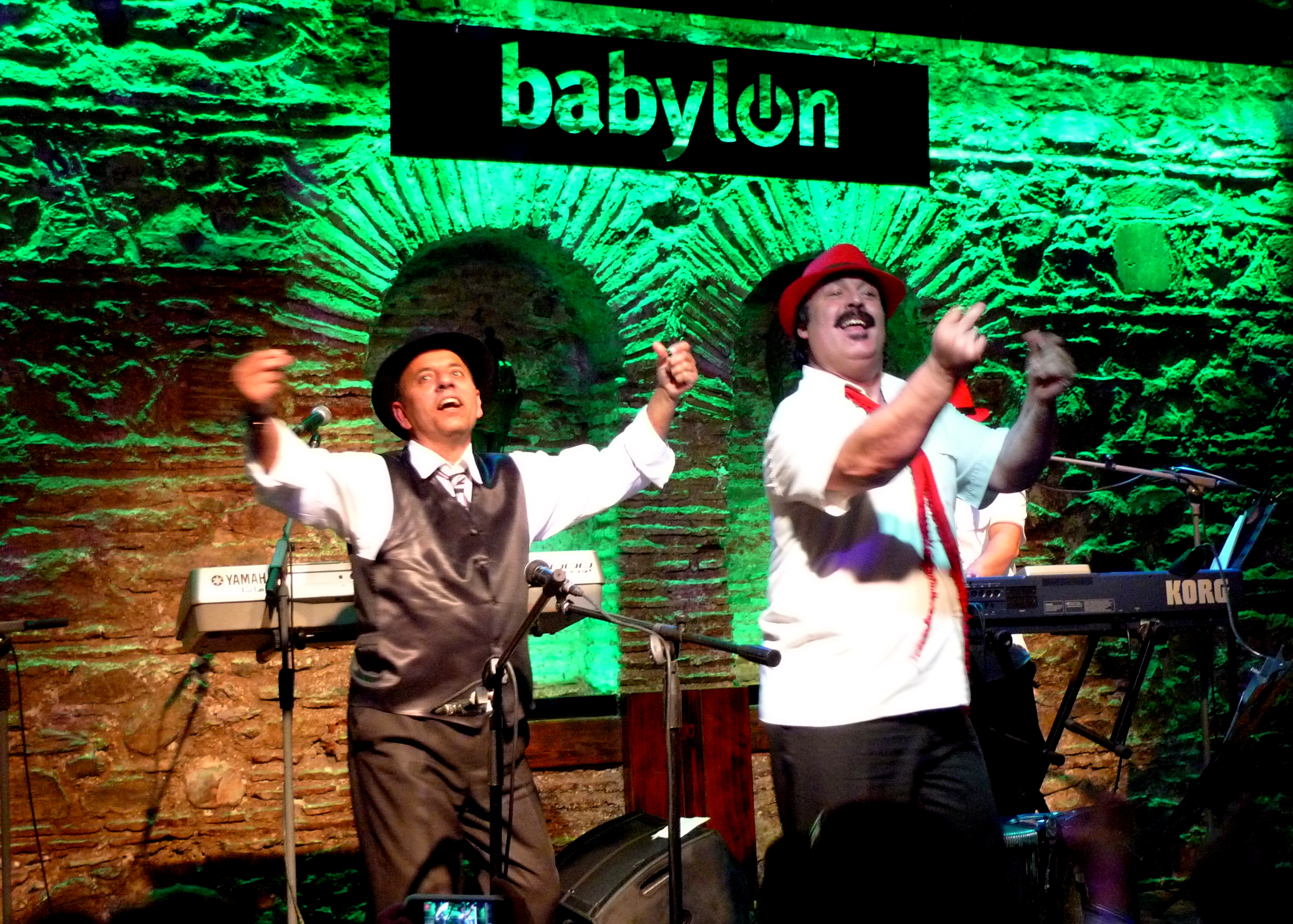
- Ciguli performing at Babylon Istanbul

Background information
- Also known as: Ciguli
- Born: Angel Jordanov Kapsov; March 1, 1957; Haskovo, Bulgaria
- Died: 31 October 2014 (aged 57) Sofia, Bulgaria
- Genres: Chalga, pop
- Occupations: Singer, musician
- Instruments: Vocals, accordion
- Years active: 1998–2014

Ciguli (1 March 1957 – 31 October 2014) (born Angel Jordanov Kapsov; Bulgarian: Ангел Йорданов Капсов) was a Bulgarian Chalga (pop-folk) singer and accordionist of Romani descent, who became popular in Turkey.

His real name was Ahmet. However, at the time of his birth, Bulgarian authorities did not allow Turks to use their own name. Thus, they refused to register his real name in registry, although his family continued to call him Ahmet. His name was registered as Angel Jordanov Kapsov. Because of the speed and agility with which he played the accordion, he earned the nickname 'Ciguli'—a reference to the Zhiguli VAZ-2101, a Soviet-made sedan that was immensely popular in Bulgaria at the time.

He was introduced to the casino scene by playing the accordion for Hülya Avşar at Çakıl Gazinosu in 1991. He played behind İbrahim Tatlıses and Sibel Can on stage at the İzmir Fair in the summer of 1998. He made his name known in the music community with the colorful shows that both artists put on during their stage programs. The best known songs of Ciguli include "Binnaz", "Şiki Şiki Baba" and "Yapma Bana Numara!".

== Discography ==
- 1999: Binnaz
- 2000: Horozum
- 2003: Sabır Yaaa Sabır
- 2006: Ben Akordiyonum
- 2007: Safinaz - Tersyorum
- 2010: Sensiz Kaldım Şimdi

== Filmography ==
- 1998: Bizim Sokak
- 2003: Neredesin Firuze
- 2004: Biz Boşanıyoruz
- 2012: Bu Son Olsun
- 2014: Olur Olur
- 2015: Limonata (tyre repair mechanic)
