= Beste Bereket =

Turkish actress

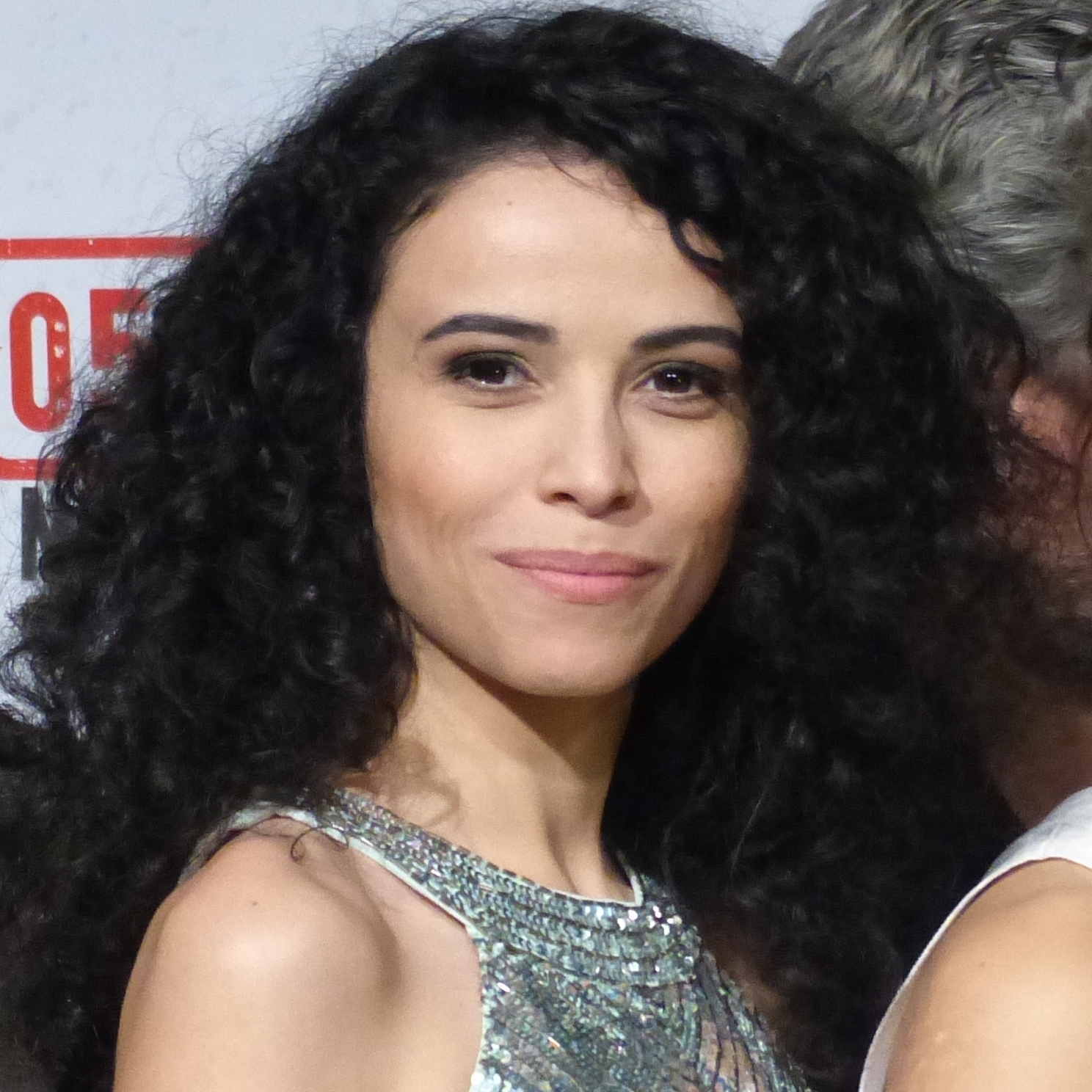
- Beste Bereket in 2015
- Born: 2 July 1982 (age 43); Istanbul, Turkey
- Occupation: Actress
- Years active: 2005–present

Beste Bereket (born 2 July 1982) is a Turkish actress. She appeared in more than twelve films since 2005.

== Selected filmography ==
Film
Year	Title
2005	Derivative
2010	Five Cities

TV
Year	Title	Role
2011	Leyla and Mecnun	Zeynep
