= Ezgi Asaroğlu =

Turkish actress

- Born: 18 June 1987 (age 39); İzmir, Turkey
- Occupation: Actress
- Years active: 2004–2021
- Awards: Dublin Silk Road Film Festival, Best Actress Award, 2014
- Website: www.ezgiasaroglu.com

Ezgi Asaroğlu (born 18 June 1987) is a Turkish film and television actress.

== Life and career ==
=== TV Series ===
She first appeared on cable TV in the TV series Bir Dilim Aşk, which marked her screen debut at age 17. During the years, she had roles in the top-rated TV series and the popularity of the series made Ezgi Asaroglu well known to audiences in Turkey.

After comedy series Leyla ile Mecnun and Yağmurdan Kaçarken, she began starring in a drama series O Hayat Benim. The series continued for four seasons, one hundred thirty-one episodes and also broadcast in several countries with a huge success which gained international recognition to Asaroglu.

=== Films ===
In 2005, she appeared in the short movie What's Love Doing in the Mountains? which won awards at film festivals around the world. Ezgi's film career started with her role in the 2008 award-winning independent film, For a Moment, Freedom (aka Ein Augenblick Freiheit), a biting, tragicomic refugee drama which has won 30 international awards. Since then, she has taken on starring roles. In 2009, she starred in Kampüste Çıplak Ayaklar (aka Barefoot on Campus). Her performance received critical acclaim, and other successful films followed, including Acı Aşk, En Mutlu Olduğum Yer, Aşk Kırmızı, Cennetten Kovulmak (which earned her "Best Actress Award" from Dublin Silk Road Film Festival), Sağ Salim 2: Sil Baştan.

== Filmography ==
=== TV series ===
Year	Title	Role	Director	Notes and Awards
2004	Bir Dilim Aşk	Pelin	Yüksel Aksu, Ümmü Burhan	
2004	Zor Karar	Meral	Nihat Özcan, Feride Kaytan	
2006	Kızlar Yurdu	Gülenay	Ceyda Demir	
2007	Yolcu	Kader	Ali Artaç	
2007	Menekşe ile Halil	Canay	Uluç Bayraktar	
2008	Hatırla Sevgili	Rüya	Ümmü Burhan	
2008	Gece Sesleri	Zehra	Cemal Şan	
2009	Binbir Gece	Duru	Kudret Sabancı	
2011	Leyla ile Mecnun	Leyla	Onur Ünlü	
2012	İşler Güçler	Aslı Baytar (Guest)	Selçuk Aydemir	
2013	Yağmurdan Kaçarken	İdil	Jale İncekol	
2014-2017	O Hayat Benim	Bahar	Merve Girgin, Hülya Bilban	
2020-2021	Mucize Doktor	Ezo (guest)	Yusuf Pirhasan, Aytaç Çiçek	

=== Films ===
Year	Title	Role	Director	Notes and Awards
2005	What's Love Doing in the Mountains?	Ayşe	Yunus Emre Fırat	* California Chapman University Cecil Awards for Best Undergraduare Picture and Best Screenplay Produced * California Independent Film Festival, Slate Award for Best Foreign Short * Humboldt International Film Festival, Festival Prize for Best Foreign Language Romantic Drama * Garden State Film Festival, Jury Award for Best Short Student International * Santa Cruz Film Festival, Audience Award for Best Student Film * Hollywood International Student Film Festival, Festival Prize for Best Foreign Language Romantic Drama * Angelus Awards Student Film Festival, Honorable Mention for Production Design * 2007 Boston Motion Picture Awards 2nd Place Winner * Harlem International Film Festival, New York, USA * 5. Taos Mountain Film Festival, New Mexico, USA * International Diversity Film Market, Washington, DC USA * Edmonton International Film Festival, Canada * Manaki Brothers International Film Camera Festival, Macedonia * Temecula Valley International Film Festival, California, USA Official Site
2008	For a Moment, Freedom	Jasmin	Arash T. Riahi	* Montréal World Film Festival, the Golden Zenith for the Best First Fiction Feature Film * 4. Zurich Film Festival, the Golden Eye for the Best Debut Feature Film * 13. Festival International Des Jeunes Realisateurs De St Jean De Luz, Alain Poire Screenvision Award for Best Director * Festival du Cinéma Européen en Essonne in France, the Public Award and the Student Award * Viennale 08-International Filmfestival, Vienna Film Prize for the Best Austrian Film * 2. Festival Internacional San Luis Cine/Argentina, Mejor Guion for the Best Screenplay * 5. Amazonas Filmfestival/Manaus Brasil, Grand Prize and Publics Prize for the Best Movie * 19. Festival International du Film D'Histoire-Pessac/France, Main Award of the Jury and Student Award and also the Publics Prize * 30. Max Ophüls Festival, Interfilm Award and Prize of the Minister President of the State of Saarland; *10° European Cinema Festival "Special Jury Award", "Special Audience Award", Lecce/Italy * 10. International Beverly Hills Film Festival * 13. Asien-Premiere Internationales Filmfestival Pusan * Mostra de valencia Spanien * Festival Ciné 32 Indépendance(s) et Creation Official Site
2009	Kampüste Çıplak Ayaklar	Deniz	Cansel Elçin	*Montreal Golden Horn Film Festival Opening Film
2009	Acı Aşk	Seda	Taner Elhan	*Mannheim-Heidelberg Film Festival, Germany; *Cairo Film Festival, Egypt; *29. International Istanbul Film Festival, Turkey Official Site
2010	En Mutlu Olduğum Yer	Elif	Kağan Erturan	
2012	Cennetten Kovulmak	Emine	Ferit Karahan	*50. International Antalya Film Festival, the Golden Orange for the Best Feature Film; *The Silk Road Film Festival, Ireland, The Silk Road Award for the Best Actress; *25. Ankara International Film Festival, Mahmut Tali Öngören Special Award; *50. Pesaro Film Festival, Italy, Human Rights Special Mention
2013	Aşk Kırmızı	Zeynep	Osman Sınav	*Berlin Turkish Film Festival Opening Film; *New York Turkish Film Festival Opening Film Official Site
2014	Sağ Salim 2: Sil Baştan	Nihal	Ersoy Güler	

== In other media ==
Year	Film	Director	Notes and Awards
2004	Molped	Bahadır Karataş	* 17th Crystal Apple Advertising Awards - Certificate of Achievement Award Winner in Turkey, 2005.
2005	Çilek Furniture	Mert Baykal	
2005	Coca-Cola	Serdar Işık	
2005	Redd	Mete Özgencil	* Redd "Mutlu Olmak İçin" Music Video
2007	Biryağ	Hakan Yonat	
2007	Vodafone	Özer Feyzioğlu	
2008	Ülker Yıldız	Hakan Yonat	
2008	27th International Istanbul Film Festival	Çağan Irmak	
2008	Vodafone	Burcu Matur Yolcu	
2009	Polisan Home Cosmetics	Eric Will	
(Source: IMDb.com)
