= Ether addiction =

Addiction to ingesting diethyl ether

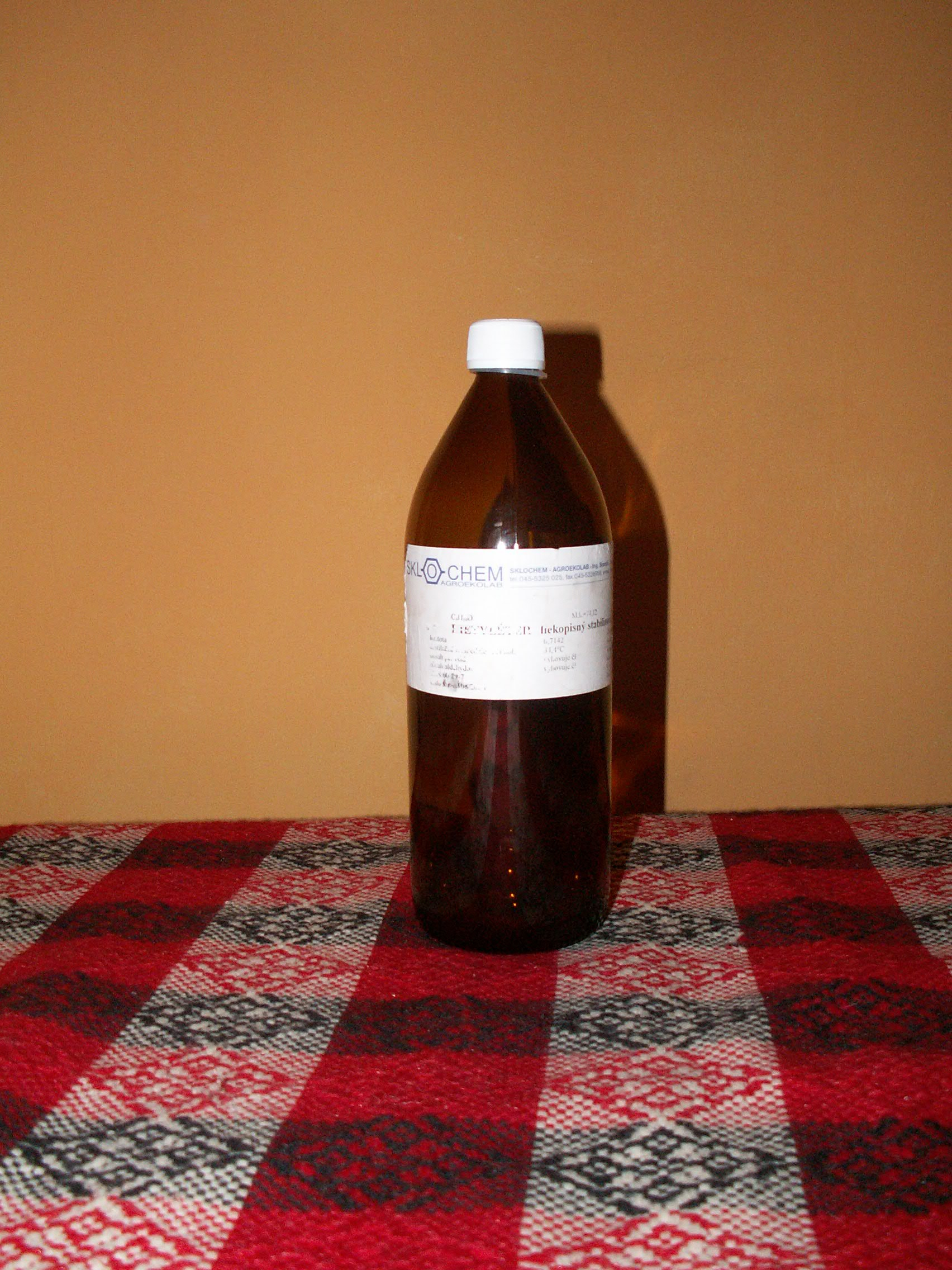
Bottle of diethyl ether from Slovakia

Addiction to ether consumption, or etheromania, is the addiction to the inhalation or drinking of diethyl ether, commonly called "ether". Studies, including that of an ether addict in 2003, have shown that ether causes addiction; however, the only symptom observed was a will to consume more ether. No withdrawal symptoms were prevalent.

== History ==
During the second half of the 19th century, ether was in vogue as a recreational drug in some places, becoming especially popular in Ireland, as Irish temperance campaigners thought it was an acceptable alternative to alcohol.

Addiction to ether consumption had posed a serious social problem in Poland during the Interwar period. The drinking of ether, as well as related liquids (Hoffman's drops) was commonplace and widespread foremost in the region of Upper Silesia. According to surveys conducted in the 1930s, in certain villages a large portion of pupils of public schools had regularly drunk ether. Teachers had recalled that at certain times they had to send home pupils who were under the influence of the drug. Common drinking of ether by mine workers caused a ban on access by intoxicated persons to the mines (the main cause for concern was the risk of fire). Plant doctors had received a stark warning to drastically limit the purchases of ether and its mixtures for factory doctors' offices. The Catholic Church was engaged in fighting this addiction; it was often the topic of sermons, certain priests refused absolution to the addicted, and even reported their parishioners to the police. The consumption of ether was also spread in the regions of Suwałki, south-eastern Poland, the Beskidy mountains, Kujawy, Pomerania and around Częstochowa.

Smuggling across the German and Czechoslovak borders was the primary source of ether, with local authorities estimating thousands of kilograms were smuggled yearly. Ether was mainly smuggled by inhabitants of border regions, who sometimes used specially trained dogs. Both people and dogs smuggled ether in protruding metal containers that lay very close to the body and were attached to it with straps (termed blachany, from the Polish word blacha meaning "steel sheets", from which they were made). Sometimes special compartments in cars were used, and attempts recorded include transporting ether via cable cars stretched across a border river.

Ether was distributed among the villages by wagons transporting straw, as well as by travelling salesmen, organ grinders, and beggars. Within the villages themselves, ether was distributed in designated places, termed kapliczki ("chapels" in Polish). These were places both of sale and consumption. Many accidents caused by improper handling of fire were recorded at such places. Through the early 21st century ether has seen a strong resurgence amongst teenagers in India.

== Consumption ==
Drinking ether is challenging as it boils below body temperature and is not miscible with water, requiring precautions:

There is an art in swallowing the ether. The drinker first washes out his mouth with water “to cool it;” next he swallows a little water to cool his throat; then he tosses down the glass of ether; finally, he closes in with another draught of water to keep the ether from rising, or, in other words, to cool his stomach, so that the volatile ether may not be lost by eructation of its vapour. In a little time the "trick” is easily acquired by members of both sexes.

Another recorded means of consumption was by inhalation of vapor, which develops at room temperature due to ether's volatility. The risks to the gastric system inherent in imbibing ether are avoided by using inhalation, and the effects are significantly shorter lasting.

== Legislation ==
In 1923, the Polish Sejm had forbidden the sale of ether for consumption. In 1928, ether was officially classified as a drug, and anti-drug legislation was extended to include it. Severe penalties, up to five years of imprisonment and high financial penalties, from that moment on were not only imposed for smuggling and trade of ether, but also for its possession.

In the second half of the 1930s, media as well as government institutions had focused on the problem. In May 1936, a special conference in Katowice was called by the Polish National Committee for Drugs and Prevention of Drug Addictions functioning within the Ministry of Employment and Social Policy.

== Effects ==
The effects of ether intoxication are similar to those of alcohol intoxication, but more potent. Also, due to NMDA antagonism, the user may experience distorted thinking, euphoria, and visual and auditory hallucinations at higher doses.

== Present situation ==
Ether is still sometimes consumed in border areas of Estonia (Setomaa).

== Literature ==
- In Tolstoy's War and Peace (set in 1812 and published in 1869) Countess Rostova's sitting-room is described as having a strong smell of Hoffman's drops (Book 3, part 3, chapter 13).
- In an autobiographical work French author Patrick Modiano mentions his use of ether during the early '60s and indirect references occur in his novels. It is described as used by two characters in Georges Simenon's 1932 crime novel, L'Ombre chinoise (English: Maigret Mystified).
- Ether is referred to in Hunter S. Thompson's 1971 novel Fear and Loathing in Las Vegas for its drug effects, pointedly describing it as having the most powerful and depraved of possessions on men who take it. Thompson's descriptions of ether's effects in his novel are exaggerated and somewhat fictional. In fact, it is seen in one of the book's most infamous quotes:

We had two bags of grass, seventy-five pellets of mescaline, five sheets of high powered blotter acid, a salt shaker half full of cocaine, and a whole galaxy of multi-colored uppers, downers, screamers, laughers... and also a quart of tequila, a quart of rum, a case of Budweiser, a pint of raw ether and two dozen amyls... Not that we needed all that for the trip, but once you get locked into a serious drug collection, the tendency is to push it as far as you can. The only thing that really worried me was the ether. There is nothing in the world more helpless and irresponsible and depraved than a man in the depths of an ether binge.

- Dr. Wilbur Larch, in John Irving's novel The Cider House Rules, is an ether addict.
- In Antonio Iturbe's novel based on the life of Antoine de Saint-Exupery, The Prince of the Skies (translated by Lilit Zekulin: Macmillan, 2021), the pilot Jean Mermoz is described drinking ether, and becoming addicted to it. (This follows an earlier cocaine addiction.) The drug helps numb his sense of poverty while he is looking for employment as a pilot.
- Dr. Foster—Ruth's father, and Milkman Dead's grandfather—is described as an ether addict in Toni Morrison’s novel Song of Solomon.

== Television ==
- In the second season of the television series Borgia, Rodrigo Borgia, named Pope Alexander VI, and his mistress become addicted to sweet oil of vitriol (a 16th-century name for diethyl ether). Delusions, paranoia, and hallucinations plague the pope as he falls deeper into his addiction.
- Dr. Charles Montgomery, in the first season of American Horror Story, is shown to have acquired an ether addiction.
- In the sixth season of the television adaptation of Outlander, Claire Fraser temporarily develops an addiction to ether while self-medicating for her PTSD-induced insomnia and nightmares. Her use of ether was driven by auditory and visual hallucinations.
- İsmail Abi, a character from the Turkish TV series Leyla and Mecnun consumes ether by drinking directly. Ether's effects were exaggerated in the series.
- A depressed factory town that grew up around a now-derelict ether production plant is the setting for Apple TV's Severance in Season 2 Episode 8, titled Sweet Vitriol. In the episode, Harmony Cobel and an old co-worker, who is presented as having an addiction, are depicted getting high from huffing ether.

== Film ==
- The 2024 Danish film The Girl with the Needle features extensive ether consumption with characters attempting to replicate its effects with other substances.
- Fear and Loathing in Las Vegas depicts ether use by the main characters, accompanied by a voice-over description of the effects from one of them, Raoul Duke (Johnny Depp): "It makes you behave like the village drunkard in some early Irish novel. Total loss of all basic motor skills. Blurred vision, no balance, numb tongue. The mind recoils in horror, unable to communicate with the spinal column. Which is interesting because you can actually watch yourself behaving in this terrible way, but you can't control it."
