= Mehmet Usta =

Turkish actor (born 1973)

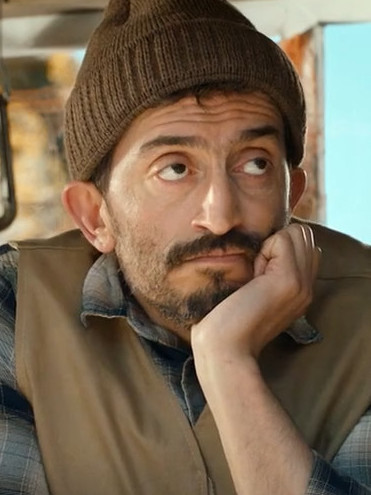
- Born: 20 February 1973 (age 52); Düzce, Turkey
- Occupation: Actor
- Years active: 1997–present

Mehmet Usta (born 20 February 1973) is a Turkish actor.

== Life and career ==
Usta was born in Düzce. His family is from Trabzon and they moved to Istanbul when he was one year old. He finished his primary and secondary education at Aksaray Mahmudiye School, after which he attended Istanbul Davutpaşa High School. He completed his bachelor's degree at the School of Arts and Sciences of Marmara University and earned his master's degree in the Department of Sociology and Anthropology at Marmara University Institute of Social Sciences, in the field of Art Sociology with the thesis "Traditional Turkish Theater on the Axis of Modernity and Modernization". He was interested in Far East Martial Arts before enrolling in university. After finishing his education, he started appearing on stage and soon made his debut in cinema and television.

He rose to prominence with his television roles as "Ölü" in hit series Ekmek Teknesi and as "Şoker" in Fox's hit fantasy child series Bez Bebek. He then starred in the TRT 1 hit surreal comedy series Leyla ile Mecnun as "Kamil", before portraying the character of "Gomodor" in Fox's fantasy child series Dedemin Dolabı. He subsequently starred in period series Bir Yusuf Masalı as "İkram". In 2021, he was cast in a leading role in the action drama TV series Teşkilat as Zayed Fadi.

== Filmography ==
Title	Year	Role
Teşkilat	2021–	Zayed Fadi
Görevimiz Komedi	2016–2017	
Bana Bir Soygun Yaz	2012	Hadi
Dedemin Dolabı	2012	Gomodor
Leyla ile Mecnun	2011	Kamil
Dur Yolcu	2008	Çolak Çavuş
Mommo Kızkardeşim	2009	Grocer
Kara Köpekler Havlarken	2009	Anten
Kınalı Kuzular: Son Nefes	2007	Zeynel
Kınalı Kuzular: Beni Sizlerden Ayırmayın	2007	Lieutenant Yusuf
Kınalı Kuzular: Reşit Paşa Vapuru	2007	Bekir çavuş
Kınalı Kuzular: Hasan Ethem	2007	Edirneli Hüseyin
Bez Bebek	2007–2010	Şoker
Erkekler Ağlamaz	2006	İnce Memet
Kınalı Kuzular: Kınalı Hasan	2006	Laz Yunus
The İmam	2005	Deli
Ekmek Teknesi	2002	Ölü
Ruhsar	1997	Selçuk
