= Derivative (film) =

- Theatrical Poster
- Directed by: Ulaş İnaç
- Written by: Ulaş İnaç
- Produced by: Ulaş İnaç
- Starring: Gülçin Santırcıoğlu; Beste Bereket; Tuğra Kaftancıoğlu; Güçlü Yalçıner; Atıl İnaç
- Cinematography: Elif Usman; Senem Tüzen
- Edited by: Deniz Kayık
- Music by: Toygar Işıklı
- Distributed by: Özen Film
- Release date: November 18, 2005
- Running time: 90 minutes
- Country: Turkey
- Language: Turkish
- Budget: US$9,000 (estimated)

Derivative (Turkish: Türev) is a 2005 Turkish drama film, written, produced and directed by Ulaş İnaç based on a short story by Miguel de Cervantes, about the complicated relationships between three people who confess their thoughts each evening to the camera for a movie project. The film, which went on nationwide general release across Turkey on November 18, 2005, won the Golden Orange for Best Film at the 42nd Antalya "Golden Orange" International Film Festival.

== Plot ==
Nazım (Güçlü Yalçıner) is a successful young Istanbul writer who is about to marry Süreyya (Gülçin Santırcıoğlu). Süreyya is not sure about Nazım's love and so she asks her best friend Burcu (Beste Bereket) to seduce him in order to test his fidelity. Reluctantly Burcu complies and then she falls in love.
