= Umutsuz Ev Kadınları =

Turkish drama television series

- Genre: Comedy drama Mystery
- Created by: Marc Cherry
- Based on: Desperate Housewives by Marc Cherry
- Written by: Meryem Gür; Gül Gürsoy; Yelda Eroğlu
- Directed by: Özlem Bayşu Ünlü; Barış Erçetin
- Starring: Songül Öden; Bennu Yıldırımlar; Ceyda Düvenci; Deniz Uğur; Özge Özder; Evrim Solmaz
- Theme music composer: Ayşe Önder; Ümit Önder
- Country of origin: Turkey
- Original language: Turkish
- No. of seasons: 3
- No. of episodes: 154

Production
- Production locations: Istanbul, Turkey
- Running time: 90 min. (1-54); 45 min. (55-80); 60/70 min. (81-154)
- Production company: Med Yapım

Original release
- Network: Kanal D (2011-2012); FOX (2012-2014)
- Release: October 2, 2011 – June 19, 2014

Umutsuz Ev Kadınları is a Turkish comedy-drama television series based on the American comedy-drama television series Desperate Housewives.

== Series overview ==
Season	Episodes	Originally aired (Turkey)	
Season	Episodes	Season premiere	Season finale
1	37	October 2, 2011	June 17, 2012
2	43	October 11, 2012	June 16, 2013
3	74	September 7, 2013	June 19, 2014

== International broadcasts ==
Country	Network	Premiere date	Original Name
Turkey	Kanal D (1); FOX (2-3)	October 2, 2011	Umutsuz Ev Kadınları
Northern Cyprus	Kanal D (1); FOX (2-3)	October 2, 2011	Umutsuz Ev Kadınları
Arab World	MBC4	January 13, 2012	نساء حائرات
North Macedonia	Kanal 5	April 28, 2012	Очајни домаќинки
Bulgaria	NTV	June 4, 2012	Другите отчаяни съпруги
Albania	TV Klan	30 November 2014	Shtëpiake të dëshpëruara
Serbia	Prva Srpska TV	January 20, 2014	Domaćice sa Bosfora
Montenegro	Prva TV	February, 2014	Domaćice sa Bosfora
Greece	Star Channel	July 14, 2014	Γυναίκες σε απόγνωση

== Differences from the original series ==
- Andrew is not gay.
- Katherine is not a lesbian and does not leave the street with Robin.
- Susan does not move out from Wisteria Lane in the 6th season.
- Eddie does not kill his mother or move in with Lynette.
- Julie does not become pregnant.
- Edie does not have a son.
- Mike is not a plumber, he is an electric engineer.
- Bree never becomes an alcoholic.
- Orson does not hit Chuck with a car.
- Yasemin's house does not have a gas explosion in the 1st season, its windows are smashed.
- No plane falls onto the street.
- Bree's house does not get damaged from a tornado, it is damaged by a gas explosion. Sylvia blew up the kitchen to kill herself.
- Karen McCluskey's house does not get demolished by a tornado.
- Gabrielle is acted by two actresses, firstly (1-80) Evrim Solmaz, then (80-154) Deniz Uğur.
- There is not as much sexual content as in the original series.
- Karl does not die, but he does not appear after the 2nd season. In the rest of the seasons Karl is changed with Julie's uncle Ejder.
- Bree and Karl do not get together.
- Susan does not do cleaning in front of a webcam in lingerie.
- Edie does not die, Özge Özder continued to act as Renee Perry from the 124th episode until final.
- Karl does not buy a house for Susan after hers burnt down, he rents one.
- Susan does not stay in a caravan after her house burnt down.
- Susan does not write children's novels, she is a tailor.
- Susan and Karl do not have sex in the second season. Karl comes to Susan's house drunk and vomits so she has to take him into her house.
- Victor Lang does not die in the tornado, he is shot by Wayne.
- Carlos does not become blind from getting hit in the head with a flying object, he becomes blind from being shot in the head by Victor.
- Beth does not commit suicide with a gunshot, she cuts herself in Susan's bathroom.
- 4362 Wisteria Lane's, Edie's and Renee's house, is replaced with three houses. In the first episode it was a first-floor, single-story apartment flat. After a fire it is replaced with another apartment flat in the street. In the third season it is replaced with a blue, two-story house.
- Mary Alice's house does not include a pool. The pool is replaced with a tree.
- There is not a character for Ida Greenberg.
- Alejandro is not Gabrielle's stepfather, he is her ex-husband who beat her during their marriage.
- Susan does not get locked out naked, she was in her bathrobe.
- Susan does not have a relationship with anyone when Mike is in a coma.
