= Luran Ahmeti =

Albanian actor (1974–2021)

Luran Ahmeti (Skopje, 31 July 1974 – Skopje, 25 March 2021) was an Albanian actor of theater, cinema and television.

== Early years and his career ==
Luran Ahmeti was born on 31 July 1974, in Skopje, Socialist Federal Republic of Yugoslavia, to a family of Albanian descent. He stated that his father was a literary and anti-communist, and that he had been discriminated against as a child. He graduated with a bachelor's degree as an actor from St. Cyril and Methodius University of Skopje. During and after graduation, he was active in many Theatre Shows. He started his acting career in first appearing in several productions in Skopje. Luran Ahmeti, was fluent in many languages and so he was able due to his persistence to speak Turkish in few months and first started acting in Turkey by portraying the character of Dimitri in the TV series Elveda Rumeli. He played Ottoman statesman Divane Hüsrev Pasha in the 2013 TV series Muhteşem Yüzyıl.

He was known for is role in Hollywood's movie Taken 2.

== Personal life and opinions ==
Ahmeti, who started living in Istanbul, where came to shoot the series Elveda Rumeli, married an Albanian woman from Tirana and they have a daughter named Arba. In an interview in 2016, Ahmeti described the wars as "the worst thing in the world" and stated that he was still afraid of the Russians because of his life of exile in the past and living with the Slavs in his childhood, he did not trust them and would not be friends with the Russians all his life.

== Death ==
He died on March 25, 2021, in Skopje, the capital of North Macedonia, due to COVID-19 at the age of 46.

== Filmography ==
=== Cinema ===
- Puppet show (1998)
- Stories about Love (2001)
- Bal-Can-Can (2004)
- 10 (2007)
- Izstop (2007)
- Hayde Bre (2010)
- Güzel Günler Göreceğiz (2011)
- Limonata (2015)
- Acı Kiraz (2020)

=== TV series ===
- Kurtlar Vadisi Pusu (2015–2016)
- Mutlu Ol Yeter (2015)
- Muhteşem Yüzyıl (2013)
- Son Yaz-Balkanlar 1912 (2012)
- Elveda Rumeli (2007–2009)
- Balkan Düğünü (2009)
- Bahar Dalları (2009)
- Tek Başımıza (2011)
- Reis (2011)
- Karakol – Herkes Adalet İster (2011)
- Büyük Sürgün Kafkasya (2015–2016)
