= Güven Sak =

Turkish economist and academic (born 1961)

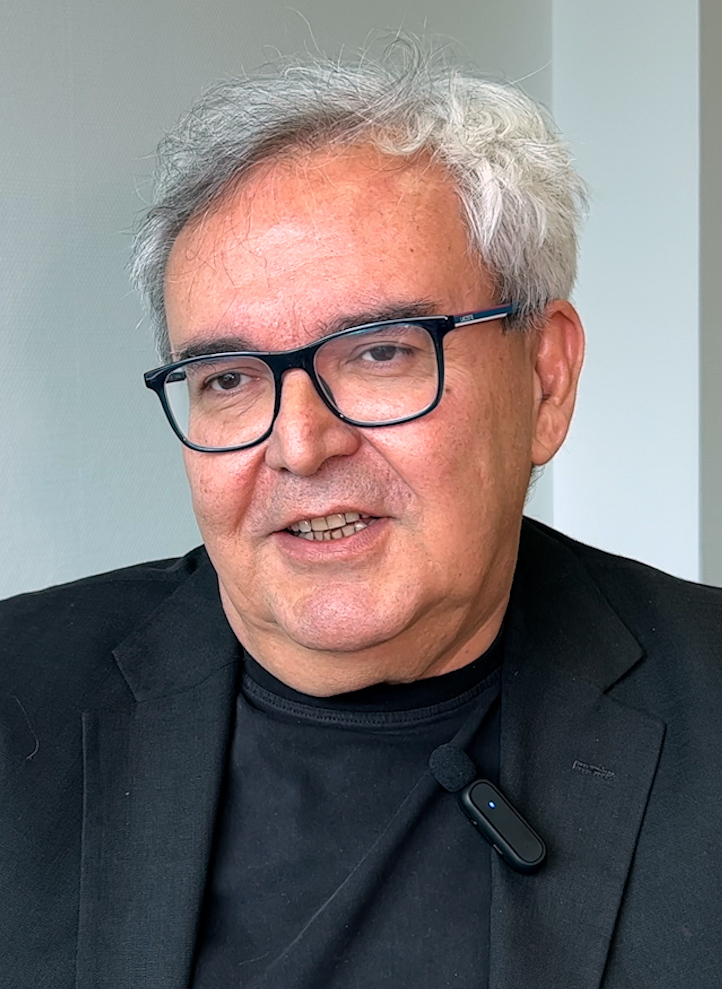
Güven Sak

Güven Sak (born 1 January 1961) is a Turkish economist and academic.

== Biography ==
Born in Bursa, Turkey, Sak graduated from the University of East Anglia with a master's degree in economics in 1984, and with a PhD in economics from the Middle East Technical University in 1994. He was a founding member of the Monetary Policy Committee of the Central Bank of the Republic of Turkey, to which he was appointed as an external member in 2001 for a five-year term. He was rector of TOBB University of Economics and Technology from 2011 to 2013, and is currently managing director of the Economic Policy Research Foundation of Turkey (TEPAV).
