= Boston Motion Picture Awards =

Competition

The Boston Motion Picture Awards are a group of international film and screenwriting competitions founded in 2004. The competitions are Internet-based and reward both student and professional filmmakers with money and other prizes donated by sponsors. The BMPAs typically accept entries during the summer and early fall and then send out the ten best entries to a panel of guest judges.

== Categories ==
International Short-Film Competition (2004–Present)
International Spoof-Writing Competition (2007–Present)

== Judges ==
BMPA Judges have included the following celebrities:

- Stephen Root (Dodgeball: A True Underdog Story, Finding Nemo, Office Space, King of the Hill)
- Keiko Agena (Gilmore Girls, Kim Possible)
- Trace Beaulieu (Mystery Science Theater 3000, Freaks and Geeks)
- Siu Ta (Harold & Kumar Go to White Castle, This Is Wonderland)
- Toddy Walters (South Park, South Park: Bigger, Longer & Uncut)
- Cirroc Lofton (Star Trek: Deep Space Nine, The Hoop Life)

== History ==
The BMPAs were founded in 2004 by Boston-based filmmakers Aaron Howland and Seth Howland of 7 Fluid Oz. Productions LLP. The competition was initially for short films only, but a writing competition was added in 2007. Aaron and Seth Howland are best known for their indie short film The Albino Code, a parody of The Da Vinci Code that CNN said would be "enough to make the Mona Lisa grin", which was featured on CNN, MSNBC, and Inside Edition.

Said Hari Das, the winner of the first BMPA International Short-Film Competition, has said "The BMPA has put together an awards package that helps both the novice and experienced filmmakers. This is because their awards focus on what filmmakers really want and need. BMPA both energizes and equips you to make new films while their friendly, supportive people make you want to have a lasting relationship with the agency."

== Winners ==
International Short-Film Competition:

- 1st Place (2006): Danya (Beth Armstrong)
- 2nd Place (2006): What's Love Doing in the Mountains? (Yunus Emre Firat)
- 3rd Place (2006): Do You Want the Elephant Music (Leslie Dektor)
- 1st Place (2005): The Photo (Hari Das)
- 2nd Place (2005): Necrolog (Steven Addair)
- 3rd Place (2005): Winter (En Hiver) (Andy Collen)
