= Burak Aksak =

Turkish screenwriter, director and actor

- Born: 12 September 1985 (age 40); Istanbul, Turkey
- Education: Anadolu University
- Occupations: screenwriter, director and actor
- Years active: 2009-present

Burak Aksak (born 12 September 1985) is a Turkish screenwriter, director and actor. He is best known for writing Leyla ile Mecnun hit surreal comedy series. Her cousin is writer Selçuk Aydemir.

== Filmography ==
Series
Year	Title	Role	Screenwriter	Director	Note
2009	Ramazan Güzeldir	Mecnun	Yes	Yes	
2009	Kurban		Yes	Yes	
2011-2023	Leyla ile Mecnun		Yes	No	
2013-2014	Ben de Özledim	Burak Aksak	Yes	No	
2016-2017	Sevda Kuşun Kanadında		Yes	No	
2021	50m2		Yes	Yes	
Film
Year	Title	Role	Screenwriter	Director	Note
2015	Bana Masal Anlatma		Yes	Yes	
2015	Kara Bela		Yes	Yes	
2017	Dede Korku Hikayeleri: Bamsı Beyrek		Yes	Yes	
2017	Dede Korku Hikayeleri: Deli Dumrul		Yes	Yes	
2017	Dede Korku Hikayeleri: Salur Kazan - Zoraki Kahraman		Yes	Yes	
2017	Sen Kiminle Dans Ediyorsun		Yes	Yes	
Short Film
Year	Title	Role	Screenwriter	Director	Note
2005	Profesyonel	Burak	No	No	
2005	Gövde Gösterisi		Yes	Yes	
2006	Dünyanın Savaş Hali	Rojdar	No	No	
2006	Ayrılık		Yes	Yes	
2007	Adres Soran Adam	Burak	No	No	
2007	Yüzük		Yes	Yes	
2007	Napsak Napsak	Burak	Yes	No	
