= Güven =

Güven is a Turkish unisex given name which is also used as a surname. It means "trust" Notable people with the name are as follows:

== Given name ==
- Aydın Güven Gürkan (1941 – 2006), academician and politician
- Güven Güneri (born 1987), Turkish footballer
- Güven Gürsoy (born 1992), Turkish footballer
- Güven Hokna (born 1946), Turkish actress
- Güven Kıraç (born 1960), Turkish actor
- Güven Önüt (1940 – 2003), Turkish footballer
- Güven Sak (born 1961), Turkish economist and academic
- Güven Sazak (1935 – 2011), Turkish politician
- Güven Varol (born 1981), Turkish footballer
- Güven Yalcin Turkish footballer

== Surname ==
- Ayhancan Güven (born 1998), Turkish racing driver
- Azmiye Hami Güven (1904 – 1954), Turkish novelist
- Adem Güven (born 1985), Turkish-Norwegian footballer
- Banu Güven (born 1969), Turkish journalist
- Burak Güven (born 1975), Turkish musician
- Egemen Güven (born 1996), Turkish basketball player
- Erhan Güven (born 1982), Turkish footballer
- Ferhat Güven (born 1983), Norwegian politician
- Halil Güven, Cypriot-born professor and the rector of Istanbul Bilgi University
- Leyla Güven (born 1964), Turkish politician
- Mehmet Güven (born 1987), Turkish footballer
- Ozan Güven (born 1975), Turkish film, TV series and theatre actor
