= Hayde Bre =

- Theatrical Poster
- Directed by: Orhan Oğuz
- Written by: Orhan Oğuz
- Produced by: Yasemin Küçükçavdar Güler
- Starring: Şevket Emrulla; Nilüfer Açıkalın; İlker İnanoğlu; Mustafa Yaşar; Perihan Tuna; Luran Ahmeti; Suzan Kardeş; Ayberk Koşar; Ay Doğa Vardar
- Cinematography: Adnan Güler
- Edited by: Murat Bör
- Music by: Orhan Topçuoğlu
- Release dates: October 2010 (Antalya); December 31, 2010 (Turkey)
- Running time: 120 minutes
- Country: Turkey
- Language: Turkish

Hayde Bre is a 2010 Turkish drama film, directed by Orhan Oğuz, about a man from the countryside unable to adjust to life in Istanbul. The film, which went on nationwide general release across Turkey on December 31, 2010, premiered in competition at the 47th Antalya "Golden Orange" International Film Festival (October 9–14, 2010).

== Production ==
Director Orhan Oğuz, who was born in the Thracian province of Kırklareli and is the son of a family that emigrated from Yugoslavia in 1948, spent twenty years working on the film, which tells the story of his step grandfather, including ten years looking for a suitable actor to play the lead role of Şevket Ağa before selecting Macedonian actor Şevket Emrulla.

== Plot ==
Şaban Agha (Şevket Emrulla) lives in a small Macedonian village with his wife and friends in a small town while his stepdaughter Saadet (Nilüfer Açıkalın) lives in the Istanbul with her three children and paralysed husband whom she has to take care of. The lives of Şaban Agha and Saadet intersect unexpectedly, after Saadet travels to the village for her son's circumcision ceremony and without the least desire, Şaban Agha moves to Istanbul at Saadet's insistence upon her return. However, it proves impossible for him to adapt to city life and the rules of the system. Though he still considers himself a “guest” in Istanbul, the land he is homesick for is in fact long lost. Unaware of this fact, Şaban Agha plans to move back at the earliest opportunity, as he comes to realize that he will not be able to manage in the city.

== Release ==
=== Premiere ===
The film premiered in competition at the 47th Antalya "Golden Orange" International Film Festival on October 12, 2010.

=== Festival screenings ===
- 47th Antalya "Golden Orange" International Film Festival (October 9–14, 2010)
- 2011 Shanghai International Film Festival (awarded Best Film and Best Actor for Şevket Emrulla)
- 2011 Turkish Movie Days, Helsinki (September 29-1.10, 2011)

== See also ==
- Turkish films of 2010
