= Ankara Park (Seoul) =

Park in Seoul, South Korea

- 앙카라공원
- Location: Yeouido-dong, Yeongdeungpo District, Seoul, South Korea
- Coordinates: 37.51747°N 126.93017°E
- Area: 1.65 ha (4.1 acres)
- Opened: May 1, 1977
- Etymology: Ankara, Turkey

Ankara Park (Korean: 앙카라공원), also called Sister Park (자매공원) is a park in Yeouido-dong, Yeongdeungpo District, Seoul, South Korea. It is named for Ankara, Turkey, and has been open since May 1, 1977.

== Description ==
On August 23, 1971, Ankara and Seoul were made sister cities. On October 29, 1973, a Korea Park was established in Ankara. Ankara Park first opened in Seoul on May 1, 1977.

The park has an area of 1.65 ha (4.1 acres). Inside the park is a Turkish-style house and museum called "Ankara House" that was installed in 1992, various statues, four pergolas, a badminton court, a gateball court, and a management building. It has over 5,000 plants, including 51 varieties of pine trees.

The park contains Turkish art donated by the city of Ankara. In 2024, representatives of Seoul and Ankara agreed to renovate the facilities of the park.
