= Dormitory (film) =

- Directed by: Nehir Tuna
- Screenplay by: Nehir Tuna
- Starring: Doğa Karakaş
- Cinematography: Florent Herry
- Edited by: Ayris Alptekin
- Music by: Avi Medina
- Release date: 2 September 2023 (Venice)
- Countries: Turkey; Germany; France
- Language: Turkish

Dormitory (Turkish: Yurt) is a 2023 coming-of-age drama film written and directed by Nehir Tuna, at his feature film debut.

The film premiered at the 80th edition of the Venice Film Festival, in the Horizons sidebar.

== Cast ==
- Doğa Karakaş as Ahmet
- Can Bartu Aslan as Hakan
- Ozan Çelik as Yakup
- Tansu Biçer as the father
- Didem Ellialti as the mother

== Production ==
For the film, Nehir Tuna drew on his own experience attending a religious boarding school for five years. The film is a sequel of his award-winning short film The Shoes, and is a co-production by Turkish company TN Yapım, German Red Balloon Film GmbH, and French Ciné-Sud Promotion, with support from the Sundance Fellowship for Production and Development. Filming took place in Izmir, in the Aegean Region of Turkey, between 2019 and 2022.

== Release ==
The film Horizons section at the 80th Venice International Film Festival. The film was also screened at the 2023 Marrakech International Film Festival, where Doğa Karakaş was awarded best actor.

== Reception ==
The film was described as 'a pleasant surprise, offering the paradoxical story of a teenager caught between religious tensions and explosions of testosterone.'
