= Leyla and Mecnun =

Turkish television comedy series

- Leyla ile Mecnun
- Written by: Burak Aksak
- Directed by: Onur Ünlü; Murat Onbul
- Starring: Ali Atay; Melis Birkan; Serkan Keskin; Ahmet Mümtaz Taylan; Cengiz Bozkurt; Osman Sonant; Köksal Engür; Ege Tanman; İştar Gökseven
- Theme music composer: Mehmet Erdem; Alper Atakan
- Country of origin: Turkey
- Original language: Turkish
- No. of seasons: 7
- No. of episodes: 144

Production
- Producers: Orkun Ünlü; Funda Alp
- Production locations: Istanbul; Ankara (Episode 13)
- Cinematography: Serdar Ünlütürk; Eyüp Boz (Season 1-2)
- Editor: Murat Bör
- Running time: 80 minutes

Original release
- Network: TRT 1 TRT HD Exxen (2021-2023)
- Release: 9 February 2011 – 31 March 2023

Leyla ile Mecnun (Leyla and Mecnun) is a Turkish television comedy series. The series, set in Istanbul and directed by Onur Ünlü, premiered in 2011 on TRT. It is a surreal, absurdist comedy revolving around the parody of the poetic love story of Layla and Majnun. It released seasons 1-3 on TRT1 between 2011 and 2013, then seasons 4-7 on the streaming platform Exxen between 2021 and 2023.

== Plot ==
Leyla and Mecnun were born in the same hospital and shared the same crib because of a shortage—hence the series' catchphrase, "They found each other from the beginning". They were named after the legendary lovers Layla and Majnun. Mecnun, a confused 25-year-old from a middle-class family, lives in an historic Istanbul neighborhood. Mecnun falls in love with Leyla at first sight, and becomes obsessed with her. Leyla, from an upper-class family, leads a different life than others in the neighborhood. She enjoys the time she spends with Mecnun, since life is more interesting with him. After Leyla's death, Mecnun becomes depressed. He tries to change the past. Leyla's parents donated her organs. Mecnun meets other 4 Leylas.

In the classic story of Layla and Majnun, after being prevented from marrying, Qays, who is renamed Majnun ("the madman"), is driven mad by his love and flees to the desert.

Other notable characters in the series are Dede, Iskender, Ismail, Erdal, Yavuz, and Arda. Dede, a character in Turkish folktales, appears in dreams to provide direction and foreknowledge. A surrealistic element of the show, Dede appears in one of Mecnun's dreams; when Mecnun wakes up, he sees Dede standing by his bed. Afterwards, he lives with Mecnun to help him with Leyla.

Iskender, Mecnun's father, drives an unreliable taxi and is devoted to his family. To make his son happy, he asks Leyla's father for permission for Leyla and Mecnun to marry despite repeated refusals.

Ismail, Mecnun's closest friend, is a colorful character who is loyal and pure at heart. It is learned in one episode that Ismail and his father were abandoned by his mother because her life was not colorful enough. Ismail takes this literally, and dresses accordingly. He was adopted by another family when his father became terminally ill. His father told Ismail that he was leaving to work as a seaman and would return someday, waving from the ship; since then, Ismail has been waving to passing ships every day from the shore. Nothing is known about Ismail's personal life or where he lives. He frequently changes jobs, failing at (or disliking) each one. Ismail is interested in genealogy, and notable people from the past (such as Beethoven, Picasso and Dostoyevsky) appear in his flashbacks as his distant relatives during most episodes.

Erdal is the neighborhood grocer, whose work defines his life. Sometimes greedy and inconsiderate, he neglects his friends and is tactless and pessimistic. With supermarkets springing up everywhere, Erdal personifies an endangered element of traditional Turkish society. His grocery store is a gathering place for the characters.

Yavuz, a friendly neighborhood thief, describes himself as a "performance artist". His justifications for stealing vary by episode and include helping his blind girlfriend, helping his friends and unrequited love. Yavuz' talents are used to benefit the neighborhood; he resents being called a thief, and always retorts: "Am I such a person?" He enjoys reading poetry.

Arda, Leyla's classmate, is also in love with her and his wealthy father tries to persuade her to marry his son. Arda, his father and their servants are the show's main antagonists.

== Characters ==
- Mecnun Çınar (Ali Atay): Son of middle-class Pakize and Iskender and an underachieving distance education student
- Leyla Yılmaz (Ezgi Asaroğlu): Mecnun's first Leyla, who dies in a car crash and whose organs are donated by her parents
- İsmail Abi (big-brother Ismail) (Serkan Keskin): Mecnun's childhood friend, a job-hopper waiting for his father to return. He's known for his ether addiction.
- İskender (Ahmet Mümtaz Taylan): Mecnun's father, a taciturn taxi driver
- Ak Sakallı Dede (white-bearded grandpa) (Köksal Engür): Elderly man who first appears in Mecnun's dreams, later living with Mecnun and his father
- Erdal Bakkal (Cengiz Bozkurt): Miserly neighborhood grocery-store owner. Iskender's childhood friend, he is selfish and shameless.
- Yavuz (Osman Sonant): Thief who claims to be a performance artist. A master lock-picker who appreciates the lighter weight of LED televisions, he is a close friend of Mecnun.
- Arda (Ushan Çakır): Leyla's spoiled ex-boyfriend, who likes to show off with his father's money
- Sedef Leyla (Zeynep Çamcı): Pizza-delivery woman who is involved in Leyla and Şirin's car accident. Critically injured, she receives Leyla's liver. When Mecnun learns that her middle name is Leyla, he develops a crush on her.
- Şirin (Müge Boz): A clever physics student who is injured in Leyla and Sedef's car accident and receives Leyla's heart. Mecnun loves her, partly because she has his lover's heart, and she changes her name to Leyla for him.
- Ömer Yedinci (Atilla Şendil): Father of Leyla (Melis Birkan) and İskender's childhood friend, who appears in the third season, he owns a tire shop.
- Leyla Yedinci (Melis Birkan): Ömer's daughter, with whom Mecnun falls in love at first sight
- Pakize Çınar (Asuman Dabak): Mecnun's mother
- Metin Yılmaz (İştar Gökseven): Leyla's father
- Sevim Yılmaz: Leyla's mother
- Zeynep (Beste Bereket)
- Kamil (Mehmet Usta)
- Karabasan (Nightmare) (Köksal Engür): Arda's father
- Benjamin (Sarp Aydınoğlu)
- Nurten: Erdal's wife
- Leyla the Goth (Neslihan Aker): Nurten's niece
- Çakmasakallı dede (fake bearded grandpa)
- Hidayet (Cihan Ercan)
- Fyodor Dostoyevsky (Bülent Baytar)
- Zekiye (Esra Kızıldoğan)
- Telat Abi (Sadi Celil Cengiz)
- Kubilay (Kubilay Çamlıdağ)

=== Significant Leylas ===
"Leyla, Leyla, Leyla ... Everyone is Leyla, Yavuz! Literally! I guess only my mom is not named Leyla ... Actually, let me go ask her ..." says Mecnun in one episode. These are the series' significant Leylas, in chronological order:

1. Leyla Yılmaz (Ezgi Asaroğlu): The first Leyla dies in a car crash. Mecnun becomes depressed after her death, not speaking for a whole year, and tries to jump off a cliff when the doctor tells him Leyla is dead. Ismail Abi talks to him, and they sit down and cry.
2. Şirin (Müge Boz): Changes her name to Leyla to impress Mecnun, whom she first thinks is strange before she warms up to him. Unaware that Leyla is an organ donor, he sees no purpose in life without her. When a man who received one of Leyla's corneas visits Mecnun's house, Mecnun asks: "Leyla?" The man says that when he closes his eyes he sees Mecnun, and though that if he found Mecnun he could be at peace. When Mecnun learns that Leyla's parents donated her organs, he tries to find every recipient to see who received her heart. Although he suspects Şirin, he is unable to ask her. After a romantic dinner one night, Mecnun brings her back to her house and gingerly tries to broach the subject. Şirin sees Mecnun's embarrassment and says, "Actually ... I know what you are looking for. And I have the answer". She tells him to come closer, and shows him her surgical scar. Mecnun puts his ear to her heart and hears, "Mecnun ... Mecnun ...". Weeping, he asks: "Leyla? ... Leyla? ... Leyla ..."
3. Sedef Leyla (Zeynep Çamcı): Sedef is a tough pizza delivery woman. Although her middle name is Leyla, only her father uses it and she wants no one else to call her Leyla. Sedef lives with her devoted grandmother; her father abandoned the family when she was young, and her mother died shortly afterwards. One day, she bumps into Mecnun and drops a key. Unaware of the key, she argues briefly with him and leaves. Mecnun then finds the key and takes it to return to her. He forgets to return the key, which makes Sedef suspect that he is a thief. When Mecnun begins looking for Leyla's heart, he visits Sedef's house because she is on the list of organ recipients. Although Sedef is not home, her grandmother becomes the grandmother he never had and he returns to her house every morning. Eventually, Sedef begins to like him. One day, Mecnun and Sedef get into an argument and she throws him out. Sedef's grandmother, trying to reconcile them, accidentally calls Sedef "Leyla".
4. Leyla (Melis Birkan): The last major Leyla in the series, who appears in season three, most closely resembles the original Leyla. Like the first Leyla, Mecnun falls in love with her when he sees her at the top of the stairs. Leyla is a businesswoman, and Mecnun's constant presence sabotages her company; once, he starts a fire. When Leyla criticizes him one day, Meclun says: "What are you doing? Why are you always criticizing me? Why are you always doing this? For once, turn around and look at yourself. Maybe you are to blame, huh? Maybe you are just not good enough. Maybe you are not made for this job. If you can't do this job, then don't. Stop!" Leyla tries to slap him, Mecnun gently grabs her hand and they gaze into each other's eyes.
5. Leyla (Deniz Işın): She has two sides, good and bad. In Mecnun's dreams, the good Leyla wants to help for save.

== Group "Leyla The Band" ==
Also, Soundtrack of "Leyla ile Mecnun". It's composed of "Leyla ile Mecnun" actors: Ali Atay, Onur Ünlü, Serkan Keskin, Osman Sonant, Fırat İkisivri, Sarp Aydınoğlu, Sarper Aksoy. Group's tour "Leyla ile Mecnun'a Veda & Ben de Özledim'e Merhaba" in 2013.

== Book of Series ==
Screenwriter of series, Burak Aksak, published "Leyla ile Mecnun" in April 2018. He stated that this book has different final.

== Spin Off "Ben de Özledim" ==
Leyla ile Mecnun was expected to be renewed for a new season. However it was cancelled after casts' support to the Taksim Gezi protest. The same actors filmed the TV series "Ben de Özledim" (2013-2014) about actors, screenwriter, director who have their TV series cancelled. The first episode of Ben de Özledim tells the finale of Leyla ile Mecnun, but Ben de Özledim is cancelled after 13 episodes.

== Unbroadcast 3rd season finale ==
In the unbroadcast finale of the show, it was in series Bende Özledim. Short version of this scene released in 4 season of Leyla ile Mecnun.

It was to be revealed that Mecnun actually had an accident when he was a child, leaving him permanently bedridden. He could not talk or move. His mother left, and his father cared for him. In reality, the entire TV series had taken place in Mecnun's imagination.

There is more of a meaning to the characters and only some of them were translatable.

While Mecnun is sleeping, a tree leaf would wave through the window; this tree leaf is supposed to represent Yavuz. Mecnun can only see the tree's leaves shadow waving through the window; this is a reason as to why Yavuz in the show almost always goes into houses through the windows. Yavuz, the tree, was planted right in their back garden by Iskender and also gave its name.

Dede is a syringe that a doctor regularly injects to Mecnun. It is a medicine fighting diseases inside Mecnun. In the show, he fights negative thoughts by trying to get rid of them via talking.

Ismail is abgold fish Mecnun watches. Ismail is regularly in his bowl.

Leyla is Mecnun’s first grade crush. However, he has never seen Leyla nor talked to her as he has only heard her name. The reason why Leyla changes through the series is because Mecnun, while watching TV, sees different women so he assumes that that one of those women which he likes is named Leyla.

The living room seen in the show is where he usually is at so most of his life he is in this room.

== Broadcast schedule ==
Season	Timeslot	Premiere	Finale	# of episodes	Season	Channel
Season 1	Wednesday, Monday 21:55	9 February 2011	4 July 2011	20	2011	TRT 1
Season 2	Monday 22:15	8 August 2011	4 June 2012	41	2011-2012	TRT 1, TRT 1 HD
Season 3	Monday 19:50	3 September 2012	17 June 2013	42	2012-2013	TRT 1, TRT 1 HD
Episode 104	Wednesday 00.45	29 January 2014		1	2014	TRT 1
Season 4	Friday 00:00	3 September 2021	5 November 2021	10	2021	EXXEN
Season 5	Friday 00:00	31 December 2021	4 March 2022	10	2022	EXXEN
Season 6	Friday 00:00	9 September 2022	11 November 2022	10	2022	EXXEN
Season 7	Friday 00:00	6 January 2023	31 March 2023	10	2023	EXXEN

== Awards ==
Year	Award	Winners	Awarded by
2011	Best series	Leyla ile Mecnun	Milliyet
2011	Best series	Leyla ile Mecnun	Radikal
2011	Best comedy actor	Ali Atay	Radikal
2012	Best comedy series	Leyla ile Mecnun	Habertürk
2012	Best male comedy actor	Ali Atay	Habertürk
2012	Best male comedy supporting actor	Serkan Keskin	Habertürk
2012	Most popular series	Leyla ile Mecnun	Istanbul Technical University
2012	Most-watched series	Leyla ile Mecnun	Karadeniz Technical University
2012	Best-loved comedy-series actor	Serkan Keskin	Karadeniz Technical University
2012	Best comedy series	Leyla ile Mecnun	Esenler
2012	Best situation-comedy series	Burak Aksak	Antalya Television Awards
2012	Best series	Leyla ile Mecnun	Milliyet
