= Ahmet Mümtaz Taylan =

Turkish actor

- Born: 12 September 1965 (age 61); Ankara, Turkey
- Occupations: Actor, director
- Years active: 1989–present
- Spouse: Ayçin İnci (m. 2007; div. 2012)
- Website: www.ahmetmumtaztaylan.com

Ahmet Mümtaz Taylan (born 12 September 1965) is a Turkish film, television and theatre actor and director.

== Biography ==
His paternal family is of Albanian descent. His maternal family is of Circassian descent. Taylan graduated in theatre from Hacettepe University State Conservatory. He is best known for his role as İskender in the hit surreal comedy series Leyla ile Mecnun and other films.

Between 1989 and 1993, he worked at the Diyarbakır State Theatre. In 1993 and 1994, he worked with Roberto Ciulli at the Theatre an Der Ruhr in Germany. Taylan has since worked in many theatrical projects with Yücel Erten. He became General Secretary of the Devlet Tiyatroları Sanatçıları Derneği or DETİS (State Theatre Artists' Association) and served in the position until he resigned in 2006. In 2002, he won the İsmet Küntay award for Best Director for the play Misafir Sahneleyişi.

== Filmography ==
Web series
Title	Year	Role	Note
Leyla ile Mecnun	2011–2023	İskender	
Behzat Ç.: Bir Ankara Polisiyesi	2012	İskender	Guest
Çırağan Baskını	2014	Hasan Paşa	
Alef	2020	Settar	
Ölüm Zamanı	2021	Cevat	
Bunu Bi' Düşünün	2021	Ahmet Kenan	
Son Gün	2023	Sinan	
Kübra	2024	Kara	

Tv series
Title	Year	Role	Note
Kızılcık Şerbeti	2024-	Abdüllah Ünal	Leading role
Kopuk	2024	Sina Kasay	
Aziz	2021-2022	Galip Payidar	
Arıza	2020-2021	Haşmet Gürkan	
Halka	2019	Cemal Sandıkçı	
Vatanım Sensin	2018	Kazım Karabekir	
İnsanlık Suçu	2018	Sami Gökdemir	
Hayat Sırları	2017	Mustafa Kuzgun	
Hayat Şarkısı	2016-2017	Bayram Cevher	
Güzel Köylü	2014-2015	Hüsnü	
Cinayet	2014	Tahir Borova	
Ben de Özledim	2013-2014	Ahmet Mümtaz Taylan	
Kötü Yol	2012	Nuri	
İşler Güçler	2012	Bus Driver	
Güneydoğu'dan Öyküler: Önce Vatan	2010	Veli Güner	
Komedi Dükkanı	2010	Guest	
Ateşe Yürümek	2010		
Sonbahar	2008	Kemal Yılmaz	
Ezo Gelin	2007	Ballı	
Hayat Apartmanı	2007	Apartman Yöneticisi	
Daha Neler	2006		
Avrupa Yakası	2006	Demir Bey	
Çapkın	2005		
Arapsaçı	2004		
Sahra	2004		
Çaylak	2003	Fişek Rıza	
Baba	2003	Haşmet	
Kurşun Yarası	2003	Selamoğlu	
Zeybek Ateşi	2002	Refik Karabulut	
Yılan Hikayesi	2002	Coşkun	
Kumsaldaki İzler	2002	Benzinci	
Offroad Tv	2001	Dritter Besucher	

=== Films ===
- Yaşamak Bu Değil (1981)
- Gazino Bülbülü (1985)
- Çifte Vakkas (1993)
- İstanbul Kanatlarımın Altında (1996)
- Barbunya Nuri (2000)
- Okul (2003)
- İnşaat (2003)
- Yazı Tura (2003)
- Kayıp Aşklar (2004)
- Anlat İstanbul (2004)
- Hırsız Var! (2004)
- Galatasaray - Depor (2005)
- Cenneti Beklerken (2005)
- Şaşkın (2005)
- Sen Ne Dilersen (2005)
- Avrupa'da Bir Günün (2005)
- Beyza'nın Kadınları (2005)
- Kınalı Kuzular: Nişanlıya Verilen Söz (2006)
- Emret Komutanım: Şah Mat (2006)
- Eve Dönüş (2006)
- Made in Europe (2007)
- Bayrampaşa: Ben Fazla Kalmayacağım (2007)
- Zeynep'in Sekiz Günü (2007)
- Başımın Belası (2007)
- Geçerken Uğradım (2007)
- Mavi Gözlü Dev (2007)
- Kars Hikayeleri (2008)
- Anında Görüntü Show (2008)
- Kadri'nin Götürdüğü Yere Git (2009)
- Gölgesizler (2008)
- Kaptan Feza (2009)
- Sonsuz (2009)
- Adını Sen Koy (2009)
- Mi Hatice (2010)
- Gişe Memuru (2010)
- Ejder Kapanı (2010)
- Saklı Hayatlar (2010)
- Ben Hatice (2011)
- Bir Zamanlar Anadolu'da (2011)
- Gergedan Mevsimi (2012)
- Kurtuluş Son Durak (2012)
- Sen Aydınlatırsın Geceyi (2012)
- Kelebeğin Rüyası (2013)
- Kötü Kedi Şerafettin (2016)
- Küçük Esnaf (2016)
- Kırık Kalpler Bankası (2016)
- Daha (2017)
- Saruhan (2016)
- Ölümlü Dünya (2018)
- Organize İşler Sazan Sarmalı (2019)
- Kar Kırmızısı (2020)
- Gelincik (2020)
- Kin (2021)
- Ölümlü Dünya 2 (2023)
