= Thou Gild'st the Even =

Thou Gild'st The Even
- Film poster
- Turkish: Sen Aydınlatırsın Geceyi
- Directed by: Onur Ünlü
- Starring: Ali Atay; Demet Evgar; Damla Sönmez
- Release date: 12 April 2013 (IIFF)
- Running time: 107 minutes
- Country: Turkey
- Language: Turkish

Thou Gild'st The Even (Turkish: Sen Aydınlatırsın Geceyi) is a 2013 Turkish drama film directed by Onur Ünlü.

Cemal is a man who lives with his father in Akhisar town of Manisa and works in his own barber shop. Cemal, who seems to be at his own pace, is in trouble, and even he doesn't know what's going on. On the other hand, in this town where almost everyone knows each other, seemingly ordinary people have extraordinary powers.

== Cast ==
- Ali Atay - Cemal
- Demet Evgar - Yasemin
- Damla Sönmez - Defne
- Ezgi Mola - Cigdem
- Ercan Kesal - Irfan
