= Onur Ünlü =

Turkish film director and actor

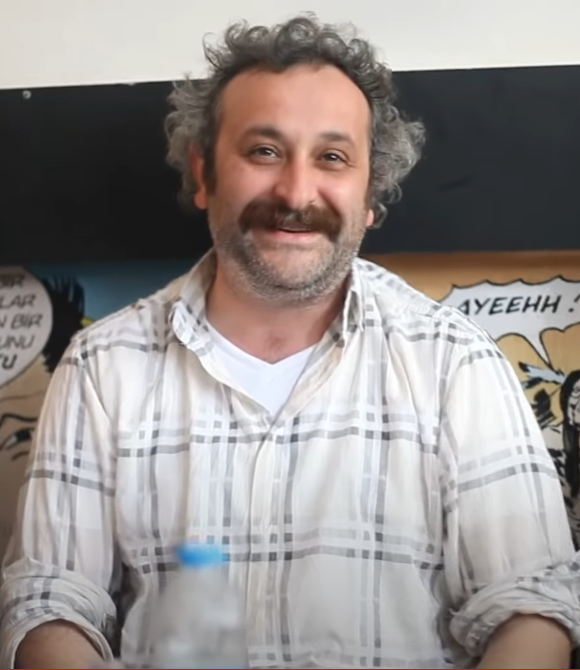
- Born: 24 June 1973 (age 52); İzmit, Turkey
- Occupation: Film director
- Years active: 1999–present

Onur Ünlü (born 24 June 1973) is a Turkish film director, screenwriter, poet and actor. He is best known for hit surreal comedy series Leyla ile Mecnun and surreal drama series Şubat.

== Filmography ==
=== Web series ===
Year	Title	Credited as		Notes
Year	Title	Director	Screenwriter	Notes
2023–2011	Leyla ile Mecnun	Yes		
2021	Bunu Bi' Düşünün	Yes		
2021	Şeref Bey	Yes	Yes	
2019	İçten Sesler Korosu	Yes		
2018	Dudullu Postası	Yes	Yes	
2017	Görünen Adam	Yes	Yes	

=== TV series ===
Year	Title	Credited as		Notes
Year	Title	Director	Screenwriter	Notes
2015	Beş Kardeş	Yes	Yes	
2013-2014	Ben de Özledim	Yes		
2013	Şubat	Yes	Yes	
2009	Acemi Müezzin	Yes	Yes	
2008	Gazi		Yes	
2006	Sırça Köşk		Yes	
2005	Kanlı Düğün		Yes	
2005	Körfez Ateşi		Yes	
2004	Görünmez Adam		Yes	
2004	İstanbul Şahidim		Yes	
1999	5 Maymun Çetesi		Yes	
1998-2001	Deli Yürek		Yes	

=== Films ===
Year	Title	Credited as		Notes
Year	Title	Director	Screenwriter	Notes
2001	Deli Yürek: Bumerang Cehennemi		Yes	
2004	Kalbin Zamanı		Yes	
2007	Polis	Yes	Yes	
2008	Çocuk	Yes	Yes	
2008	Güneşin Oğlu	Yes	Yes	
2009	Acı Aşk	Yes		
2011	Celal Tan ve Ailesinin Aşırı Acıklı Hikayesi	Yes	Yes	
2010	Beş Şehir	Yes	Yes	
2013	Sen Aydınlatırsın Geceyi	Yes	Yes	
2014	İtirazım Var	Yes	Yes	
2015	Uzaklarda Arama		Yes	
2017	Kırık Kalpler Bankası	Yes	Yes	
2017	Aşkın Gören Gözlere İhtiyacı Yok	Yes	Yes	
2017	Put Şeylere	Yes	Yes	
2017	Cingöz Recai: Bir Efsanenin Dönüşü	Yes		
2018	Sevgili Komşum		Yes	
2018	Gerçek Kesit: Manyak	Yes		
2019	Topal Şükran'ın Maceraları	Yes	Yes	
2022	Bomboş	Yes	Yes	

=== Short films ===
Year	Title	Credited as		Notes
Year	Title	Director	Screenwriter	Notes
2009	Kamil İnsan	Yes	Yes	
2012	Tek Ölüm Yetmez	Yes		
2017	Kam Ağacı		Yes	

=== As actor ===
==== Series ====
- Deli Yürek
- Leyla ile Mecnun
- Ben de Özledim

==== Film ====
- Beni Sevenler Listesi
- Momê
- Gerçek Kesit: Manyak

== Awards ==
- Golden Orange Award for Best Screenplay (2009)
- Golden Orange Award for Best Screenplay (2014)
