= List of Turkish films of 2017 =

A list of Turkish films that will be first released in 2017.

== List of films ==
| Opening | Title | Director | Cast | Genre | Ref |
|---|---|---|---|---|---|
| January 6 | Çalgı Çengi İkimiz | Selçuk Aydemir | Ahmet Kural, Murat Cemcir | Comedy | |
| January 13 | Hep Yek 2 | Orçun Benli | Gökhan Yıkılkan, Ulaş Torun, Gürkan Uygun | Comedy, Crime | |
| January 13 | Felak | Mehmet Emin Şimşek | Özlem Durmaz, Banu Çiçek, Yusuf Memiş | Horror | |
| January 13 | Gölge | Burak Donay | Yüksel Molla, Funda Dönmez, Deniz Gönen | Drama | |
| January 20 | Olanlar Oldu | Hakan Algül | Ata Demirer, Tuvana Türkay, Ülkü Duru | Comedy | |
| January 20 | Kötü Çocuk | Yağız Alp Akaydın | Tolga Sarıtaş, Afra Saraçoğlu | Romantic, teen | |
| January 20 | Pepee: Birlik Zamanı | Hüseyin Emre Konyalı | | Animation, musical, adventure | |
| January 25 | Vezir Parmağı | Mahsun Kırmızıgül | Ali Sürmeli, Yasemin Yalçın, Mahsun Kırmızıgül, Gülben Ergen | Historical, comedy | |
| February 3 | Fırıldak Ailesi | H. Can Dizdaroğlu, Berk Tokay | | Animation, comedy | |
| February 10 | Enkaz | Alpgiray M. Uğurlu | Akasya Aslıtürkmen, Berke Üzrek | Thriller | |
| February 14 | Non-Transferable | Brendan Bradley | YouTubers Shanna Malcolm, Shira Lazar, Sara Fletcher and Ashley Clements | Romantic comedy | |
| February 16 | Recep İvedik 5 | Togan Gökbakar | Şahan Gökbakar, Orkan Varan, Deniz Ceylan | Comedy | |
| February 24 | Cereyan | Mert Dikmen | Murat Yatman, Pınar Bibin, Salih Bademci | Thriller | |
| March 3 | Biz Size Döneriz | Doğa Can Anafarta | Hande Soral, Çağlar Ertuğrul, Fırat Albayram, Bestemsu Özdemir | Comedy, teen | |
| March 3 | Çünkü Onu Çok Sevdim | Erdoğan Koç | Emre Kanat, Aysu Alev Aygün | Romantic, drama | |
| March 3 | İstanbul Kırmızısı | Ferzan Özpetek | Halit Ergenç, Tuba Büyüküstün, Mehmet Günsür, Nejat İşler | Romantic | |
| March 3 | Kuyu | Serdar Bardakçı | Murat Ercanlı, Oğuzhan Yücel, Dilara Duman, Neman Asgari | Horror, thriller | |
| March 3 | Reis | Hüdaverdi Yavuz | Reha Beyoğlu, Özlem Balcı, Volkan Başaran, İsmail Hakkı Ürün | Biographical, drama | |
| March 3 | Yağmurlarda Yıkansam | Gülten Taranç | Yeliz Tozan, Derin İnce, Murat Ergür | Drama | |

== See also ==
- 2017 in Turkey
