= List of 2015 box office number-one films in Turkey =

This is a list of films which have placed number one at the weekly box office in Turkey during 2015. The weeks start on Fridays, and finish on Thursdays. The box-office number one is established in terms of tickets sold during the week.

== Box office number-one films ==
†	This implies the highest-grossing movie of the year.

#	Date	Film	Tickets sold
1	January 8, 2015	Mucize	822,798
2	January 15, 2015	Mucize	776,118
3	January 22, 2015	Mucize	650,492
4	January 29, 2015	Aşk Sana Benzer	629,180
5	February 5, 2015	Yapışık Kardeşler	440,018
6	February 12, 2015	Sevimli Tehlikeli	257,496
7	February 19, 2015	Fifty Shades of Grey	475,066
8	February 26, 2015	Ali Kundilli	253,985
9	March 5, 2015	Çarşı Pazar	241,813
10	March 12, 2015	Çarşı Pazar	173,555
11	March 19, 2015	Selam: Bahara Yolculuk	670,160
12	March 26, 2015	Kocan Kadar Konuş	489,768
13	April 2, 2015	Kocan Kadar Konuş	456,311
14	April 9, 2015	Furious 7	1,300,287
15	April 16, 2015	Furious 7	768.507
16	April 23, 2015	Furious 7	455,421
17	April 30, 2015	Furious 7	225,417
18	May 7, 2015	Avengers: Age of Ultron	672,821
19	May 14, 2015	Niyazi Gül Dörtnala	319,177
20	May 21, 2015	Niyazi Gül Dörtnala	229,725
21	May 28, 2015	Niyazi Gül Dörtnala	114,203
22	June 4, 2015	San Andreas	132,031
23	June 11, 2015	San Andreas	102,621
24	June 18, 2015	Jurassic World	255,202
25	June 25, 2015	Jurassic World	147,610
26	July 2, 2015	Terminator Genisys	184,738
27	July 9, 2015	Terminator Genisys	105,149
28	July 16, 2015	SİCCÎN 2	72,347
29	July 23, 2015	Ant-Man	171,570
30	July 30, 2015	Ant-Man	110,059
31	August 6, 2015	Mission: Impossible – Rogue Nation	259,134
32	August 13, 2015	Mission: Impossible – Rogue Nation	167,942
33	August 20, 2015	Mission: Impossible – Rogue Nation	110,606
34	August 27, 2015	Hitman: Agent 47	93,874
35	September 3, 2015	The Man from U.N.C.L.E.	61,707
36	September 10, 2015	Minions	347,608
37	September 17, 2015	Minions	232,534
38	September 24, 2015	Maze Runner: The Scorch Trials	291,123
39	October 1, 2015	Kara Bela	205,699
40	October 8, 2015	The Martian	154,730
41	October 15, 2015	Geniş Aile: Yapıştır	188,221
42	October 22, 2015	Geniş Aile: Yapıştır	168,490
43	October 29, 2015	The Last Witch Hunter	178,583
44	November 5, 2015	Hotel Transylvania 2	123,430
45	November 12, 2015	Spectre	286,030
46	November 19, 2015	Ali Baba ve 7 Cüceler	822,939
47	November 26, 2015	Ali Baba ve 7 Cüceler	501,486
48	December 3, 2015	Ali Baba ve 7 Cüceler	293,535
49	December 10, 2015	Düğün Dernek 2: Sünnet †	2,251,012
50	December 17, 2015	Düğün Dernek 2: Sünnet †	1,591,745
51	December 24, 2015	Düğün Dernek 2: Sünnet †	884,234
52	December 31, 2015	Düğün Dernek 2: Sünnet †	504,339

== Highest-grossing films ==
=== In-Year Release ===
Highest-grossing films of 2015 by In-year release
Rank	Title	Distributor	Domestic gross
1	Düğün Dernek 2: Sünnet	CGV Mars	₺59.667.404
2.	Furious 7	UIP	₺32.132.000
3.	Ali Baba and the Seven Dwarfs	CGV Mars	₺21.850.253
4.	Husband Factor	UIP	₺20.895.151
5.	Telling Tales	UIP	₺16.883.440
6.	Avengers: Age of Ultron	UIP	₺15.618.775
7.	Aşk Sana Benzer	CGV Mars	₺14.532.504
8.	Star Wars: The Force Awakens	UIP	₺11.991.951
9.	Minions	UIP	₺11.680.017
10.	Fifty Shades of Grey	UIP	₺10.462.201
