= Tosun =

== Given name ==
- Tosun Bayrak (1926–2018), Turkish author, translator, and Sufi
- Tosun Terzioğlu (1942–2016), Turkish mathematician and academic administrator

== Surname ==
- Buse Tosun (born 1995), Turkish female sport wrestler
- Cemil Tosun (born 1987), Austrian footballer
- Cenk Tosun (born 1991), Turkish football player
- Erdal Tosun (1963–2016), Turkish actor
- Gürdal Tosun (1967–2000), Turkish actor
- Hamide Bıkçın Tosun (born 1978), female Turkish Taekwondo athlete
- Hilal Tuba Tosun Ayer (born 1970), Turkish female referee
- Ismail Tosun (born 1975), Australian celebrity chef
- Murat Tosun (born 1984), Turkish football player
- Necdet Tosun (1926–1975), Turkish actor

== See also ==
- Tosun (construction equipment), remote controlled armored wheel loader developed in Turkey for combat engineering missions
- Tosun Paşa, 1976 Turkish comedy film, directed by Kartal Tibet
