= Aslıhan Gürbüz =

Turkish actress (born 1983)

- Born: 16 February 1983 (age 43); Çanakkale, Turkey
- Occupation: Actress
- Years active: 2004–present

Aslıhan Gürbüz (born 16 February 1983) is a Turkish actress. She graduated from the theatre department of Selçuk University. Gürbüz won 2011 Golden Butterfly Award Best Comedy Actress for Yahşi Cazibe

Her breakthrough came with series "Bir Bulut Olsam" alongside Engin Akyürek, Engin Altan Düzyatan, Melisa Sözen. She had leading roles in "Ufak Tefek Cinayetler" and comedy series "Yahşi Cazibe". She joined hit comedy series İşler Güçler, youth series "Bodrum Masalı", historical series Muhteşem Yüzyıl: Kösem, drama "Masumlar Apartmanı", "Kırmızı Oda".

== Filmography ==
=== TV series ===
TV series
Year	Title	Role	Note
2004–2007	Büyük Buluşma	Seda	Supporting role
2008	Gonca Karanfil	Gonca	Leading role
2009	Bir Bulut Olsam	Asiye Bulut	Supporting role
2010–2012	Yahşi Cazibe	Cazibe Abbasova	Leading role
2013	İşler Güçler	Police/Guest Star	Guest role
2014	Zeytin Tepesi	Deniz Gökçener	Leading role
2015–2016	Muhteşem Yüzyıl: Kösem	Halime Sultan	Supporting role
2016–2017	Bodrum Masalı	Maya	Supporting role
2017–2018	Ufak Tefek Cinayetler	Merve Aksak	Leading role
2020–2021	Kırmızı Oda	Kumru	Guest role
2021–2022	Masumlar Apartmanı	Ceylan Ongun	Leading role
2024	A Round of Applause	Zeynep	Leading role

=== Movies ===
Movies
Year	Title	Role	Note
2009	Kanal-İ-Zasyon	Nazlı	Supporting role
2011	Labirent	Ayla	Supporting role
2016	Kor	Emine	Leading role
2022	Bana Karanlığını Anlat	Nermin	Leading role
2022	Hazine	Niğde	Leading role
2024	Mukadderat	Reyhan	Leading role

== Theatre ==
Tiyatro
Year	Title	Role	Note
2008	Zorla Güzellik	Clarly	Leading role

== Award ==
Year	Award	Category	Work
2011	38th Golden Butterfly Award	Best Comedy Actress	Yahşi Cazibe
2011	2011 Antalya Television Awards	Best Comedy Actress	Yahşi Cazibe
2011	AyakliGazete.com TV Stars of the Year	Best Comedy Actress	Yahşi Cazibe
