= Sadi Celil Cengiz =

Turkish actor (born 1983)

- Born: 1 February 1983 (age 42); Çarşamba, Samsun, Turkey
- Occupation: Actor
- Spouse: Hilal Cengiz

Sadi Celil Cengiz (born 1 February 1983) is a Turkish actor. His family is of Circassian descent. He is best known for the hit comedy series "İşler Güçler".

== Filmography ==
Year	Title	Role
2021	Kazara Aşk	Okan
2019	Benim Tatlı Yalanım	Rafet Doğan
2017	Poyraz Karayel: Küresel Sermaye	Agent 2
2016	Biz Bir Dolaşalım	Serkan
2016	Olaylar Olaylar	Haldun
2016	Hayatımın Aşkı	Bartu
2015	Nadide Hayat	Damat
2015	Kara Bela	Hotel crew member
2015	Kara Kutu	"Supporting role"
2015	Bana Masal Anlatma	Haktan
2014	Zimbabve'den Sevgilerle	Narrator
2014	Yılanların Öcü	Village freak / supporting role
2014	Kardeş Payı	Feyyaz / supporting role
2014	Kim O	Ferhat - first season narrator
2014	Sürgün İnek	
2014	Kadın İşi: Banka Soygunu	Güvenlik
2013	Behzat Ç. Ankara Yanıyor	
2012	İşler Güçler	Himself
2011	Leyla ile Mecnun	Telat Abi
2011	Üsküdar'a Giderken	Hakkı Selçuk
2009	Ramazan Güzeldir	Konuk Oyuncu
2007	Dünyanın Savaş Hali (Short Movie)	Mithat
2006	Ayrılık (Short Movie)	Himself
