= Düğün Dernek 2: Sünnet =

- Theatrical release poster
- Directed by: Selçuk Aydemir
- Written by: Selçuk Aydemir
- Produced by: Necati Akpınar
- Starring: Ahmet Kural; Murat Cemcir; Rasim Öztekin; Erdal Tosun; Şinasi Yurtsever; İnan Ulaş Torun; Devrim Yakut
- Cinematography: Özgür Polat
- Edited by: Çağrı Türkkan
- Music by: Aytekin G. Ataş
- Release date: 4 December 2015 (Turkey)
- Country: Turkey
- Language: Turkish
- Box office: ₺69,422,924

Düğün Dernek 2: Sünnet is a 2015 Turkish comedy film written and directed by Selçuk Aydemir and starring Ahmet Kural, Murat Cemcir, Rasim Öztekin and Şinasi Yurtsever.

== Plot ==
İsmail, who had his son married in the first movie, now wants to have his grandson circumcised. As in the first movie, the entire team, especially Fikret, Çetin and İsmail, gather and start preparations for the circumcision ceremony. This ceremony eventually turns into a city-wide event.

== Cast ==
- Ahmet Kural - Tüpçü Fikret
- Murat Cemcir - Çetin (Çeto)
- Rasim Öztekin - İsmail
- Barış Yıldız - Muallim Saffet
- Devrim Yakut - Hatice
- Şinasi Yurtsever - Yılmaz
- İnan Ulaş Torun - Damat Tarık
- Açalya Samyeli Danoğlu - Receptionist Leyla
- Erdal Tosun - Crazy Doctor
- Ayhan Taş - Fake Doctor and Leyla's father
- Nükhet Duru - Herself
- Mustafa Keser - Himself
- Hakan Akın - Mayor
- Jelena Bozic - Monica
- Deniz Erayvaz - Matias
- Juris Strenga - Leton Dede
- Zahide Yetiş - Doctor
- Ali İhsan Varol - Circumciser
- Ertugrul Gültekin - Tüpçü Çırağı
- Tuğçe Kursunoğlu - Girl in the lobby
- Ferit Aktuğ - Commissioner
- Tuna Kirli - Burglar
- Giray Altınok - Burglar
- Alper Kadayıfçı - Burglar

== Release ==
The movie was first shown in 1200 theaters across Turkey, but this number increased 1400 as the film was well-received by the audience. It was watched by 1,380,122 people in its first three days of release and grossed a total of ₺16,795,440.73 in this 3-day period. It became the most watched movie in Turkey in 2015.

Audience		Gross		Reference
First Weekend Audience (3 days)	Total audience	First Weekend Gross (3 days)	Total gross	Reference
1,380,122	6,066,421	₺16,795,440.73	₺69,374,211.67	
