= List of 2017 box office number-one films in Turkey =

This is a list of films which placed number one at the weekly box office in Turkey during 2017. The weeks start on Fridays, and finish on Thursdays. The box-office number one is established in terms of tickets sold during the week.

== Box office number-one films ==
Week	End date for the week	Film	Tickets sold	Gross (₺)	Note(s)
1	January 5, 2017	Dağ II	197,322	₺ 2,352,077	
2	January 12, 2017	Çalgı Çengi İkimiz	949,498	₺ 11,164,180	
3	January 19, 2017	Çalgı Çengi İkimiz	703,132	₺ 8,202,576	
4	January 26, 2017	Olanlar Oldu	621,543	₺ 7,335,723	
5	February 2, 2017	Olanlar Oldu	541,365	₺ 6,350,587	
6	February 9, 2017	Olanlar Oldu	297,282	₺ 3,557,209	
7	February 16, 2017	John Wick: Chapter 2	378,339	₺ 4,768,818	
8	February 23, 2017	Recep İvedik 5	2,638,819	₺ 30,845,199	
9	March 2, 2017	Recep İvedik 5	1,817,652	₺ 21,347,315	
10	March 9, 2017	Recep İvedik 5	1,048,767	₺ 12,297,916	
11	March 16, 2017	Recep İvedik 5	651,441	₺ 7,678,236	
12	March 23, 2017	Recep İvedik 5	376,832	₺ 4,404,138	
13	March 30, 2017	Sonsuz Aşk	215,950	₺ 2,517,439	
14	April 6, 2017	The Boss Baby	179,809	₺ 2,285,783	
15	April 13, 2017	Smurfs: The Lost Village	289,428	₺ 3,604,778	
16	April 20, 2017	The Fate of the Furious	1,202,933	₺ 14,489,363	
17	April 27, 2017	The Fate of the Furious	648,803	₺ 7,835,395	
18	May 4, 2017	The Fate of the Furious	311,378	₺ 3,710,498	
19	May 11, 2017	The Fate of the Furious	171,739	₺ 1,986,022	
20	May 18, 2017	4N1K	167,247	₺ 1,898,073	
21	May 25, 2017	4N1K	136,522	₺ 1,536,353	
22	June 1, 2017	Pirates of the Caribbean: Dead Men Tell No Tales	573,183	₺ 7,668,089	
23	June 8, 2017	Pirates of the Caribbean: Dead Men Tell No Tales	324,016	₺ 4,219,159	
24	June 15, 2017	The Mummy	324,525	₺ 4,324,901	
25	June 22, 2017	Cars 3	356,128	₺ 4,302,640	
26	June 29, 2017	Transformers: The Last Knight	397,826	₺ 5,159,599	
27	July 6, 2017	Transformers: The Last Knight	174,538	₺ 2,201,581	
28	July 13, 2017	Spider-Man: Homecoming	357,064	₺ 4,746,023	
29	July 20, 2017	War for the Planet of the Apes	289,273	₺ 3,617,255	
30	July 27, 2017	War for the Planet of the Apes	158,727	₺ 1,964,206	
31	August 3, 2017	War for the Planet of the Apes	104,942	₺ 1,290,004	
32	August 10, 2017	Cumali Ceber: Allah Seni Alsın	218,508	₺ 2,388,392	
33	August 17, 2017	Cumali Ceber: Allah Seni Alsın	117,059	₺ 1,281,828	
34	August 24, 2017	Annabelle: Creation	104,512	₺ 1,318,547	
35	August 31, 2017	Despicable Me 3	393,233	₺ 4,906,929	
36	September 7, 2017	Despicable Me 3	251,362	₺ 3,161,043	
37	September 14, 2017	Despicable Me 3	154,165	₺ 1,930,018	
38	September 21, 2017	It	159,263	₺ 2,234,673	
39	September 28, 2017	Ay Lav Yu Tuu	210,810	₺ 2,422,293	
40	October 5, 2017	Valley of the Wolves: Homeland	352,799	₺ 4,174,084	
41	October 12, 2017	Valley of the Wolves: Homeland	164,235	₺ 1,918,120	
42	October 19, 2017	Cingöz Recai: Bir Efsanenin Dönüşü	405,637	₺ 4,920,860	
43	October 26, 2017	Cingöz Recai: Bir Efsanenin Dönüşü	165,628	₺ 2,001,650	
44	November 2, 2017	Ayla: The Daughter of War	621,919	₺ 7,513,145	
45	November 9, 2017	Ayla: The Daughter of War	863,322	₺ 10,555,497	
46	November 16, 2017	Ayla: The Daughter of War	849,857	₺ 10,239,764	
47	November 23, 2017	Ayla: The Daughter of War	769,119	₺ 9,069,363	
48	November 30, 2017	Ayla: The Daughter of War	693,081	₺ 8,220,492	
49	December 7, 2017	Aile Arasında	955,710	₺ 12,221,806	
50	December 14, 2017	Aile Arasında	970,624	₺ 12,600,073	
51	December 21, 2017	Aile Arasında	873,265	₺ 11,107,136	
52	December 28, 2017	Aile Arasında	584,510	₺ 7,475,764	

== Highest-grossing films ==
=== In-Year Release ===
Highest-grossing films of 2017 by In-year release
Rank	Title	Distributor	Domestic gross
1	Recep İvedik 5	CGV Mars	₺85.986.157
2.	Ayla: The Daughter of War	CGV Mars	₺62.858.615
3.	Aile Arasında	CGV Mars	₺43.404.778
4.	Çalgı Çengi İkimiz	Pin.	₺32.540.648
5.	The Fate of the Furious	UIP	₺31.761.048
6.	Yol Arkadaşım	CGV Mars	₺21.884.240
7.	Olanlar Oldu	CGV Mars	₺21.353.023
8.	Pirates of the Caribbean: Dead Men Tell No Tales	UIP	₺19.814.542
9.	Moana	UIP	₺16.632.809
10.	Kolonya Cumhuriyeti	CGV Mars	₺12.826.614
