= Vote brigading =

Coordinated online voting technique

Vote brigading is massively coordinated online voting. It refers to the practice of affecting reviews or scores on websites that feature crowdvoting (e.g. online stores, review websites) by calling on large numbers of people to submit reviews, thereby boosting or decreasing ratings. This may be done for political reasons, like harming the credibility or commercial prospects of films dealing with controversial or sensitive subjects. Vote brigading is a form of participation bias, which can decrease the reliability of the aggregated score.

== Examples ==
- Free Republic, an Internet forum for conservative activists, is known for promoting vote brigading in online political polls, known as "FReeping".
- The online community Reddit, which sorts its content visibility in a popular voting system, has dealt with censorship issues related to vote brigading.
- As part of a promotional campaign conducted in 2012 for a brand of energy strips, rapper Pitbull was to be sent to a Walmart store at a location voted for by visitors of the brand's Facebook page. An organized campaign ensued, with over 70,000 visitors voting for a store at the remote island of Kodiak, Alaska.
- In 2013, 4chan engaged in vote brigading to attempt to manipulate a contest being held by Boston radio station Kiss 108, that allowed participants to meet Taylor Swift. While the brigading was successful, the organizers of the contest cancelled the event after learning of the interference.
- Gunday, a 2014 Indian film, suffered from vote brigading on IMDb due to a supposed historical inaccuracy in the opening narration of the film. At the time of its release it was the lowest-rated film on IMDb, with a 1.4/10 rating based on more than 44,000 votes, out of which 91 percent gave it just one star.
- The 2014 faith-based comedy Saving Christmas opened to negative reviews, prompting its star Kirk Cameron to use social media to ask fans to review the film positively on Rotten Tomatoes. Cameron's conspicuous promotion of vote brigading prompted a backlash of review bombs on Rotten Tomatoes that later spread to IMDb, resulting in the film having one of the lowest aggregate user ratings on both websites. Cameron attributed the campaign to "haters and atheists" opposed to the film's religious message.
- Demon, a 2015 film about a groom possessed by an evil spirit the night before his wedding, suffered from vote brigading on IMDb.
- The Birth of a Nation, a 2016 drama about a slave rebellion in 1831 Virginia, was the target of vote brigading due to the rape charges against the film's director, Nate Parker.
- Ghostbusters, the 2016 female-led reboot of the 1984 comedy by the same name, was a target of vote brigading on IMDb on the day of its release.
- Kicks, a 2016 indie film about a boy and his two friends embarking on a dangerous mission through Oakland to retrieve a pair of Air Jordan sneakers that were stolen from him, suffered from vote brigading for unknown reasons. Two other films that shared the same release date as Kicks suffered from a similar issue.
- The Promise, a 2016 film about the Armenian genocide committed by the former Ottoman Empire, rapidly received over 80,000 votes on IMDb after only three screenings, many of which were either 1/10 or 10/10.
- I Am Not Your Negro, a 2016 film about the history of racism in the United States, may have been the target of vote brigading.
- It has been suggested that the wide disparity between CinemaScore audience scores and film critics' ratings and those of Rotten Tomatoes and Metacritic users of the 2017 film Star Wars: The Last Jedi may have been due to vote brigading on the latter two.
- Captain Marvel received over 58,000 audience ratings, mostly negative, on Rotten Tomatoes within hours of its March 2019 release; for comparison, its highly grossing predecessor Avengers: Infinity War, released the previous year, received fewer audience ratings throughout its entire theatrical run. Captain Marvel was also subject to negative audience reception before its release in response to lead actress Brie Larson's supposed feminist activism.
- Interspecies Reviewers, a 2020 anime series about reviewing monster girl brothel workers in a fantasy world setting. After Funimation removed it from its online streaming platform on January 31, 2020, YouTuber Nux Taku urged his subscribers to rate the series as a 10/10 on MyAnimeList, the largest anime and manga social cataloging website, in response on February 5, 2020. After 24 hours, the score for Interspecies Reviewers went up to 9.13, making it the second highest rated anime on the site.
- Sadak 2's trailer in August 2020 became the most disliked trailer on YouTube due to the conspiracy theory surrounding the death of actor Sushant Singh Rajput (who was not among the cast of Sadak 2), alleging that the drama film's director Mahesh Bhatt, producer Mukesh Bhatt, and actress Alia Bhatt, supported nepotism and drove Rajput to suicide. In addition to being universally panned by critics, it also received 1/10 on IMDb, making it the worst-rated film ever on the website, beating Turkish movie Kod Adı: K.O.Z., which had 1.3/10.
- TikTok's rating on Google Play dropped to 1.2 due to the backlash the app received in India. As a result, Google ended up deleting millions of negative reviews.
- Racket Boys, a 2021 Korean sports drama series, due to its controversy over episode 5, which portrays Indonesian people as cheaters lacking in sportsmanship; it only received 1.0/10 on IMDb, making it the worst-rated Korean drama ever on the website.

== See also ==
- Dead Internet theory
- Internet bots
- Review bombing
- Russian web brigades
