= Bulanda =

Bulanda may refer to:

- Monika Bulanda, Poland-born musician and visual artist
- Balanta language of West Africa
- Bulanda, Kazakhstan, river
- Bulanda, Congo, river
- Tomasz Chlipała, a.k.a. Bulanda, a famous Goral baca (alpine master shepherd), see Gorce National Park
- Edmund Bulanda (1882-1951), Polish archaeologist rector of Lviv University
