= Ateşböceği =

2017 Turkish romantic comedy television series

- Genre: Romantic comedy
- Written by: Ebru Hacıoğlu
- Directed by: Barış Yöş
- Starring: Seçkin Özdemir; Nilay Deniz
- Country of origin: Turkey
- Original language: Turkish
- No. of seasons: 1
- No. of episodes: 17

Production
- Producer: Banu Akdeniz
- Production company: Mia Yapım

Original release
- Network: Star TV
- Release: 29 June – 25 October 2017

Ateşböceği (English: Firefly) is a 2017 Turkish romantic comedy television series produced by Mia Yapım. Directed by Barış Yöş and written by Ebru Hacıoğlu, the series stars Seçkin Özdemir and Nilay Deniz in the lead roles. It premiered on Star TV on 29 June 2017 and concluded on 25 October 2017, with a total of 17 episodes.

== Premise ==
Barış Buka (Seçkin Özdemir) is a successful divorce lawyer who has become distant from love and relationships. Aslı Eğilmez (Nilay Deniz), on the other hand, is an optimistic and spirited young woman who works as a taxi driver to support her family.

Their paths cross when Barış becomes involved in a legal case connected to a traffic accident involving his cousin. Aslı is searching for the person responsible for an accident that left her niece Çiçek unable to walk.

To protect his family and keep a close eye on Aslı, Barış offers her a job as his personal driver. Although initially reluctant, Aslı accepts the offer for the sake of her family.

As they spend more time together, their contrasting personalities bring them closer. However, the secrets surrounding the accident threaten to complicate their growing relationship.

== Episodes ==
No.	Original air date	Plot
1	29 June 2017	Barış Buka, a successful but lonely lawyer, finds himself facing a challenging case. His path crosses with Aslı Eğilmez, an unconventional and spirited taxi driver. Their meeting introduces Barış to a world he has never experienced before.
2	6 July 2017	Aslı remains sceptical about the unfamiliar world opening up before her, while Barış begins to realise that the situation he has started is more complicated than he anticipated. New relationships begin to develop.
3	13 July 2017	Aslı struggles to understand the unfamiliar emotions she has begun experiencing and finds herself increasingly drawn into Barış's world. Meanwhile, İlayda notices their growing chemistry and begins plotting against Aslı.
4	20 July 2017	Their separation leaves both Barış and Aslı struggling with their feelings. Aslı finds herself at a police station, while Barış is forced to spend the night at home with unexpected guests.
5	27 July 2017	Despite Barış and Teo's attempts to keep her away, Aslı attracts the attention of Cahide and Handan. Under İlayda's influence, the involvement of the two women creates complications for Aslı's family.
6	3 August 2017	The events surrounding Barış and Aslı make it increasingly difficult for Barış to reveal the truth. As the two struggle to understand their growing feelings, they become caught in a scheme devised by İlayda.
7	10 August 2017	As Barış becomes increasingly involved in Aslı's life, her fears from the past begin to resurface. A journey undertaken with Teo forces Barış and Aslı to reconsider their relationship.
8	17 August 2017	Confronting the truth leaves Barış emotionally conflicted. While Aslı remains unaware of his dilemma, she tries to help him overcome his difficulties.
9	24 August 2017	Barış decides to distance himself from Aslı in an attempt to protect her. Meanwhile, Aslı loses faith in her education and makes a decision that places Barış in a difficult position.
10	7 September 2017	Aslı and Barış temporarily put their differences aside to resolve problems threatening their neighbourhood in Kadırga. However, Veli has already begun putting his plans into action.
11	14 September 2017	Aslı and Barış discover Veli's weakness and embark on another adventure. However, İlayda becomes involved following Cahide's intervention, jeopardising Aslı's plan.
12	24 September 2017	After Emrah kidnaps Aslı, Barış becomes desperate to ensure her safety. Photographs suggesting a growing closeness between Barış and İlayda make Aslı question his intentions. Barış eventually reveals his feelings.
13	1 October 2017	Aslı and Barış decide to pursue their relationship despite the obstacles surrounding them. Meanwhile, İlayda investigates Hakan's secret in an attempt to win Barış back.
14	8 October 2017	Aslı and Barış stand by their relationship despite opposition from Cahide and Metin. Barış's attendance at Barbaros and Arzu's engagement brings back feelings of guilt as Gül comes closer to discovering the truth.
15	15 October 2017	Gül overhears Barış and Teo discussing the accident and begins to suspect that their involvement in Aslı's life is based on deception. Meanwhile, Çiçek takes her first steps, and Barış decides to confess everything to Metin.
16	22 October 2017	Barış's confession to Metin changes the dynamics between them. Meanwhile, İlayda continues threatening Aslı. In an attempt to protect Barış, Aslı feels compelled to end their relationship.
17	25 October 2017	With all the secrets finally revealed, Aslı struggles to forgive Barış for deceiving her. Determined to make amends, Barış sets out to regain her love and the trust of her family.

== Cast ==
- Seçkin Özdemir as Barış Buka: Aslı's love interest
- Nilay Deniz as Aslı Eğilmez: Barış's love interest, the youngest daughter of Neşe, younger sister of Metin and Arzu, aunt of Çiçek, and Gül's best friend
- Umur Yiğit Vanlı as Hakan Şeker: Barış's cousin and Handan's son
- Durul Bazan as Metin Eğilmez: Neşe's son, older brother of Aslı and Arzu, and father of Çiçek
- Lal Tayra Bahar as Çiçek Eğilmez: Metin's daughter and Aslı and Arzu's niece
- Çağrı Çıtanak as Teo: Barış's close friend, driver, and bodyguard
- Derya Alabora as Cahide Pars: Barış's aunt
- Şebnem Dilligil as Neşe Eğilmez: mother of Aslı, Metin and Arzu.
- Alicia Kapudağ as Arzu Eğilmez: Neşe's daughter, Aslı's older sister and Barbaros's love interest.
- Berkay Tulumbacı as Barbaros Gürkan: Gül's older brother and Arzu's love interest.
- Seda Güven as İlayda Taş: Barış's ex-girlfriend
- Gözde Çığacı as Gül Gürkan: Barbaros's younger sister and Aslı's best friend.
- Çiğdem Aygün as Sıdıka: İlayda's assistant
- Aslı Samat as Şirin: Barış's secretary.
- Belma Canciğer as Handan Pars: Barış's aunt and Hakan's mother.

== Production ==
Ateşböceği was produced by Mia Yapım, with Banu Akdeniz serving as producer. The series was written by Ebru Hacıoğlu and directed by Barış Yöş.

The series was filmed in Istanbul, with locations including Kadırga and Beykoz. Its promotional campaign introduced the central characters and their contrasting personalities ahead of its premiere in June 2017.

== Broadcast ==
Ateşböceği premiered on Star TV on 29 June 2017, at 8:00 p.m. in Turkey. Its original broadcast schedule was Thursday evenings.

In September 2017, Star TV announced that the series would move to Sunday evenings, retaining its 8:00 p.m. timeslot.

The series concluded with its seventeenth episode on 25 October 2017.

== International distribution ==
The international distribution rights for Ateşböceği, marketed under the English title Firefly, are represented by Inter Medya. The series is listed in the distributor's catalogue as a 2017 romantic comedy produced by Mia Yapım. In November 2025, Inter Medya announced that the series had been licensed to Pakistan as part of its expansion into the South Asian television market.

== Awards and nominations ==
Year	Award	Category	Recipient	Result
2017	Golden Butterfly Awards	Best Comedy and Romantic Comedy Television Series		Nominated
2017	Golden Butterfly Awards	Best Comedy and Romantic Comedy Television Series Actress	Nilay Deniz	Nominated
2017	Golden Butterfly Awards	Best Comedy and Romantic Comedy Television Series Actor	Seçkin Özdemir	Nominated
2018	Golden Butterfly Awards	Best Romantic Comedy Actor	Seçkin Özdemir	Nominated
