= Erdal Tosun =

Turkish actor (1963–2016)

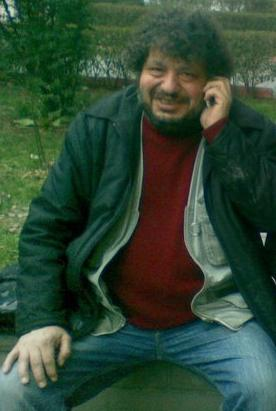
- Tosun in 2010
- Born: 9 April 1963; Istanbul, Turkey
- Died: 30 November 2016 (aged 53); Istanbul, Turkey
- Occupation: Actor
- Years active: 1982–2016
- Spouse: İlknur Tosun (m. 1995; div. 2015)
- Children: 1
- Father: Necdet Tosun
- Relatives: Gürdal Tosun (brother)

Erdal Tosun (9 April 1963 – 30 November 2016) was a Turkish actor.

== Biography ==
Born in Istanbul to actor Necdet Tosun and the older brother of actor Gürdal Tosun, he graduated from Mimar Sinan Fine Arts University in 1982 and began his career mainly as a stage actor. Tosun worked alongside noted playwrights and directors such as Murathan Mungan, Yılmaz Erdoğan and was also featured in adaptations of plays written by American actor Woody Allen. He also appeared in over 40 films and 13 television shows during his career.

On screen, Tosun made his debut film appearance in the 1983 film Mine, directed by Atıf Yılmaz. Among his most renowned appearances was the 2010 film Rina. As for television, Tosun appeared on the television series Kardeş Payı. This was one of his later performances before his death. As a voice artist, he lent his voice for a role in the video game League of Legends.

=== Personal life ===
In 1995, Tosun married İlknur Tosun. Together they had one daughter, Zeynep Kiraz Tosun, born in 1996. They divorced after 20 years of marriage.

== Death ==
In the early hours of 30 November 2016, Tosun was killed in a traffic collision while driving past a junction in Istanbul. The driver of another car lost control, causing their vehicle to overturn and land directly on top of his. Tosun lost his life at the scene. He was buried at Zincirlikuyu Cemetery alongside his father and brother.

== Filmography ==
=== Cinema ===
- Mine (1983)
- Vizontele (2001)
- Vizontele Tuuba (2004)
- G.O.R.A. (2004)
- Lovelorn (2005)
- My Father and My Son (2005)
- Magic Carpet Ride (2005)
- Home Coming (2006)
- The Masked Gang: Iraq (2007)
- Kutsal Damacana (2007)
- The Masked Gang: Cyprus (2008)
- Jolly Life (2009)
- Vay Arkadaş (2010)
- Telling Tales (2015)
- Trouble on Wheels (2015)
- Düğün Dernek 2: Sünnet (2015)

=== Television ===
- Bir Demet Tiyatro (1995-2007)
- Kardeş Payı (2014-2015)
