= Sinan Çalışkanoğlu =

Turkish actor

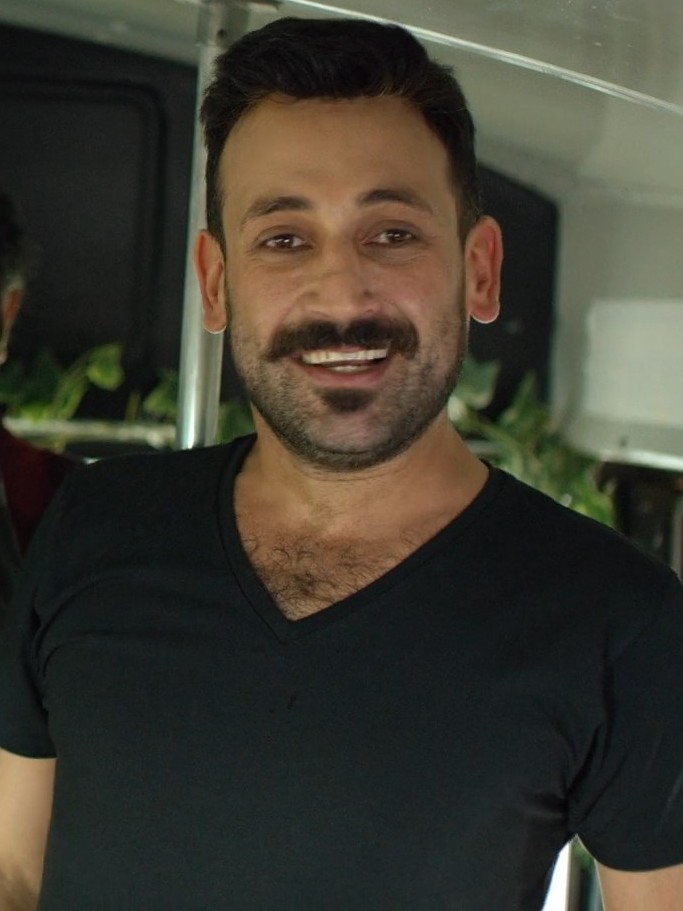
- Çalışkanoğlu in 2017
- Born: January 26, 1978 (age 48); Istanbul, Turkey
- Occupation: Actor
- Years active: 2002–present
- Spouses: Yeşim Ceren Bozoğlu (m. 2007; div. 2010) Tuğba Sarıünal (m. 2013; div. 2016)
- Website: www.sinancaliskanoglu.com

Sinan Çalışkanoğlu (born January 26, 1978) is a Turkish actor. He is best known for fantasy child series "Selena" and sketches theatre "Güldür Güldür Show". He played in many hit series "İşler Güçler", "En Son Babalar Duyar", "Hayat Bilgisi", "Türk Malı", "Bir İstanbul Masalı", "Yahşi Cazibe". He was a host of the variety show Elin Oğlu.

== Filmography ==
Film
Year	Title	Role	Notes
2005	Beyza'nın Kadınları	Kürşat	Actor
2006	Polis	Haluk	Actor
2008	Kirpi	Police agent	Actor
2008	Osmanlı Cumhuriyeti	Piştici 1	Actor
2010	İncir Reçeli	Erol	Actor
2013	Sabit Kanca	Bilgin	Actor
2014	İncir Reçeli 2	Erol	Actor
2018	Göktaşı	Mesut	Actor
2018	Ustalar Alemi	Kemal	Actor
2019	Mucize 2: Aşk	Tuğrul	Actor
2023	Gizemli Ada Mençuna		Actor
Television
Year	Title	Role	Notes
2002	Sırlar Dünyası	Köylü	Guest appearance
2003	Bir İstanbul Masalı	Yiğit	Guest appearance
2003	Hayat Bilgisi	Atacan	Actor
2004	En Son Babalar Duyar	Birol	Guest appearance
2004	Görünmez Adam	Kıl Hakkı	Actor
2005	Ters Köşe	Osman	Actor
2005	Davetsiz Misafir	Megapiksel Yüksel	Actor
2006–2009	Selena	Hades, Kinyas, Alamet Hoca	Actor
2010	Türk Malı	Yarcan Kıymık	Actor
2011	Yahşi Cazibe	Ejder Taşkın	Supporting role
2011–2013	Şanslı Masa	Himself	Presenter
2012	Türk'ün Uzayla İmtihanı	Volkan	Actor
2013	Bir Yastıkta	Hasan	Actor
2013	Kapış Kapış	Himself	Presenter
2013	Gurbette Aşk	Serdar	Actor
2013	Bir Yastıkta	Himself	sequel to Gurbette Aşk
2014	İşler Güçler	Serkan	Guest appearance
2014–2016	Kertenkele	Commissioner Levent	Supporting role
2015–2016	Elin Oğlu	Himself	Presenter
2017	Klavye Delikanlıları	Veli	Actor
2017–2018	İlk Buluşma	Himself	Presenter
2019	Efsane Aile	Himself	Presenter
2020	Hanımağa'nın Gelinleri	Burak	Actor
2022	Pelin'in Mutfağı	Himself	Guest appearance
2022	Demet Akbağ ile Güldürme Beni	Himself	Actor
2023	Başım Belada	Yüksel	Actor
