= Sema Keçik =

Turkish actress (born 1965)

- Born: Ayşe Sema Keçik; 4 October 1965 (age 61); Diyadin, Ağrı Province,Turkey
- Education: Mimar Sinan Fine Arts University
- Occupation: Actress
- Years active: 1985–present
- Spouse: Ümit Karabel (died 2008)
- Partner: Hilal Ibrahim Kurum (2017–2018)
- Children: 1

Ayşe Sema Keçik Karabel (born 4 October 1965) is a Turkish actress, best known for her role as Daye Hatun, Ayşe Hafsa Sultan close loyal servant and chief of harem in Muhteşem Yüzyıl. She also appeared in other dramas, comedies and romances series like Yeni Gelin, Bir Bulut Olsam and Aşk Yeniden.

== Life and career ==
Ayşe Sema Keçik was born on 4 October 1965 in the Diyadin district of Ağrı Province, Turkey. She pursued her higher edication in performing arts and graduated form Mimar Sinan Fine Arts University Istanbul State Conservatory.

Keçik began her professional acting career in 1985 on the theatre stage. Throughout the late 1980s, 1990s, and 2000s, she performed with major Turkish theatre companies, including Kenter Theatre, the Turkish State Theatres, Bakırköy Municipal Theatre, and Istanbul City Theatres. In addition to acting, she also worked as a director on stage productions such as Bahar Noktası.

She made her feature film debut in 2004 with the role of Nurten in Uğur Yücel's acclaimed drama Yazı Tura. Her television breakthrough came in 2009 when she played Düriye Bulut in the Kanal D drama series Bir Bulut Olsam. Between 2011 and 2012, Keçik gained widespread international recognition for portraying Daye Hatun, the loyal treasurer and chief servant of Valide Sultan, in the hit Ottoman historical series Muhteşem Yüzyıl. She followed this with prominent comedic and dramatic television roles, including Meryem Taşkın in Aşk Yeniden and Möhteber Duran in Yeni Gelin.

== Personal life ==
Keçik was married to Ümit Karabel, a soloist dancer at Turkish State Theater of Opera and Ballet, until his death in 2008. They had a daughter. In 2017 she dated her co-star, actor Halil Ibrahim Kurum. The couple drew media attention due to their 25-year age difference before eventually separating in late 2018.

== Filmography ==
- Sevdam Karadeniz (2026) – Nafiye Yeniceli
- Bereketli Topraklar (2025) – Meryem
- Asaf (2024) – Nermin
- Kırmızı Oda (2020–2021) – Sevgi
- Yeni Gelin (2017–2018) – Möhteber
- Liebe mich (2017) – Marco's Angel
- Aşk Yeniden (2015–2016) – Meryem Taskin
- Don't Look Too Far (2015)
- Until I Lose My Breath (2015) – Sultan
- Pasa Gönlüm (2014) – Necmiye
- Sarki Söyleyen Kadinlar (2013)
- Muhteşem Yüzyıl (2011–2012) – Daye Hatun
- Bir Bulut Olsam (2009–2010) – Düriye Bulut
- Toss-Up (2004) – Nurten
