= Özge Özpirinçci =

Turkish actress (born 1986)

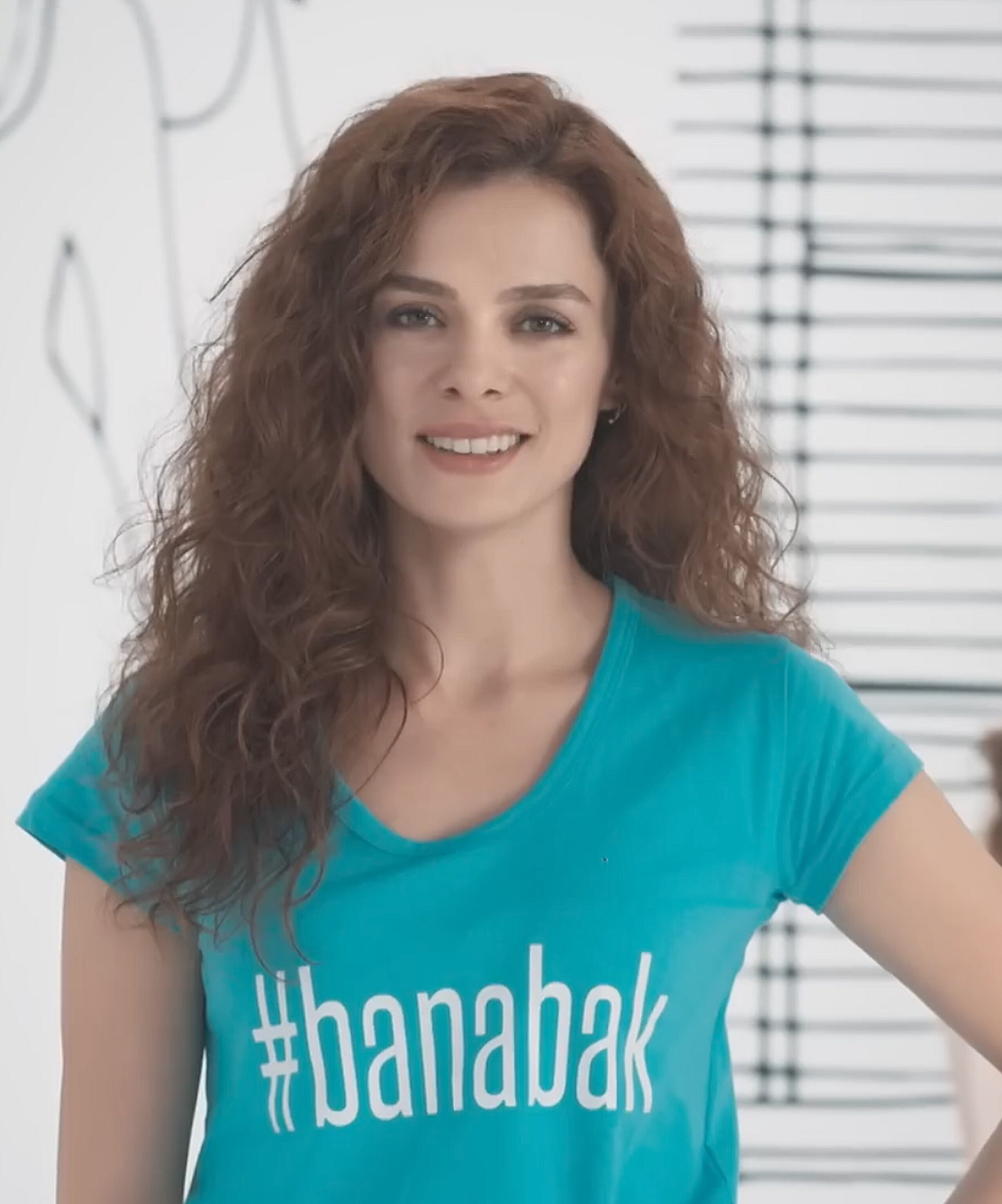
- Özpirinçci in 2016
- Born: 1 April 1986 (age 39); Istanbul, Turkey
- Occupation: Actress
- Years active: 2008–present
- Spouse: Burak Yamantürk (m. 2021)
- Children: 1
- Website: www.ozgeozpirincci.com.tr

Özge Özpirinçci (born 1 April 1986) is a Turkish television and movie actress.

== Career ==
She began her acting career with the TV series Cesaretin Var mı Aşka and Kavak Yelleri, the Turkish remake of Dawson's Creek.

Her breakthrough came with a leading role in the popular youth series Melekler Korusun. With Buğra Gülsoy, she played in romantic comedy Aşk Yeniden.

She played in a number of series that adaptation of novels, including Al Yazmalım, Deli Saraylı, Tatar Ramazan and "Ağır Roman: Yeni Dünya".

She starred in both Kadın (the Turkish remake of Japanese drama Woman) and Aramızda Kalsın, both with co-star Caner Cindoruk.

=== Web Series ===
She also had a guest role in the popular series Fi. She played in İlk ve Son. She then played in the surreal series Yakamoz S-245 with Alper Saldıran for third times.

=== Films ===
Özpirinçci starred in a feature film about the Turkish Air Force titled Anadolu Kartalları. She portrayed Fikriye in the film Veda. With Buğra Gülsoy, she played in Acı Tatlı Ekşi for twice. Her short film The Loss won multiple awards at international film festivals.

=== TV Host ===
She also hosted a television program called Toplu Hayat.

== Personal life ==
She married her Tatar Ramazan co-star Burak Yamantürk in 2021, with whom she has a daughter named Mercan.

== Filmography ==
=== Film ===
Year	Title	Role	Notes
2010	Veda	Fikriye Hanım	
2011	Anadolu Kartalları	Ayşe Dinçer	
2013	Kayıp	Woman	Short film
2014	Karışık Kaset	İrem	
2017	Acı Tatlı Ekşi	Duygu	
2018	Dissociative Özge Disorder	Özge	Short film
2020	Biz Böyleyiz	Efsun	
2020	Karakomik Filmler 2: Emanet	Deniz / Bahriye	

=== Web series ===
Year	Title	Role	Notes
2017	Fi	Sıla	5 episodes
2021	İlk ve Son	Deniz	
2022	Yakamoz S-245	Defne	

=== Television ===
Year	Title	Role	Notes
2008	Cesaretin Varmı Aşka?	Ebru Karataş	Leading role
2008	Kavak Yelleri	Ada	joined
2009–2010	Melekler Korusun	İpek Taşkır Üstündağ	Leading role
2010	Deli Saraylı	Dilruba	Leading role
2011–2012	Al Yazmalım	Asiye Has Ateş	Leading role
2012	Ağır Roman Yeni Dünya	Zehir Ahu	Leading role
2013–2014	Tatar Ramazan	Alin Terziyan	joined
2014–2015	Aramızda Kalsın	Görkem	joined
2015–2016	Aşk Yeniden	Zeynep Taşkın	Leading role
2017–2020	Kadın	Bahar Çeşmeli	Leading role
2019	Mucize Doktor	Bahar Çeşmeli	guest
2023–2025	Sandık Kokusu	Karsu Çelik	Leading role

=== Music videos ===
Year	Title	Artist	Ref(s)
2014	Derine	Murat Dalkılıç	
2015	Kördüğüm	Murat Dalkılıç	

=== Dubbing ===
Year	Title	Role	Notes
2012	Paddle Pop Adventures 2: Journey Into the Kingdom (Turkish Version)	Leena	
2012	Petualangan Singa Pemberani (Turkish Version)	Leena	
