= Burcu Esmersoy =

Turkish model (born 1976)

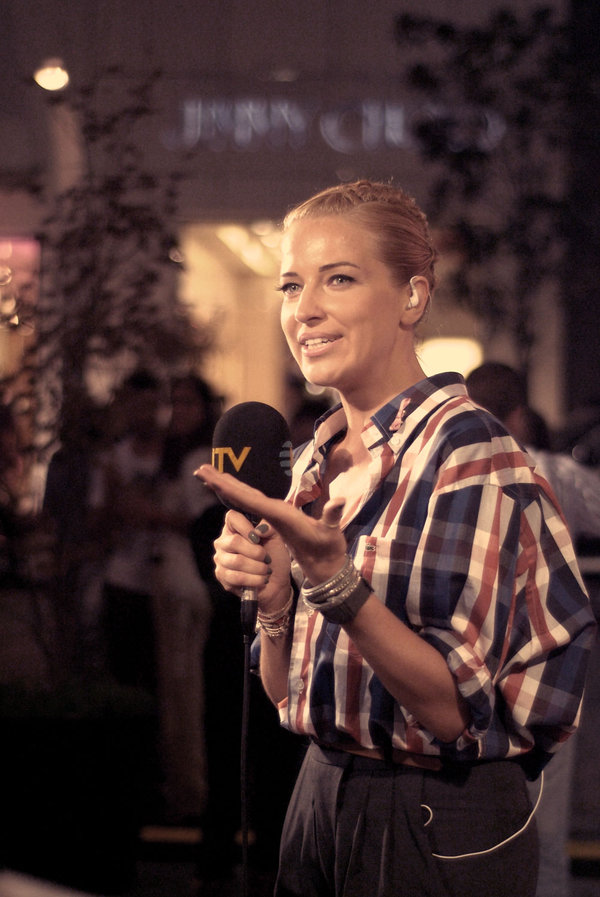
- Esmersoy during Fashion's Night Out 2010 at Istinye Park
- Born: Kamile Burcu Esmersoy; 2 October 1976 (age 49); Istanbul, Turkey
- Education: New York University; Istanbul University
- Occupations: Actress, anchorwoman, beauty pageant contestant, journalist, model, and presenter
- Years active: 1997–present
- Spouses: Massimo Cusimano (m. 2005; div. 2008) Berk Suyabatmaz (m. 2018; div. 2019) Nazım Akmandil (m. 2023)
- Modeling information
- Height: 1.74 m (5 ft 8 1/2 in)
- Hair color: Blonde
- Eye color: Blue
- Agency: Gaye Sökmen

Kamile Burcu Esmersoy (born 2 October 1976) is a Turkish actress, anchorwoman, journalist, model, occasional and beauty pageant titleholder who represented her nation at Miss International 1997 in Japan. She received a Golden Butterfly Award for Best Female Presenter. Burcu Esmersoy is one of Turkey's leading female reality show hosts and highest-paid television personalities. Amongst the Turkish television shows hosted by Esmersoy are Ver Fırına, Survivor, Popstar, Nedir Ne Değildir, Late Summer Night with Burcu Esmersoy, Komedi Türkiye, En Güzel Bölüm, Elin Oğlu, and Dancing with the Stars. As an actress, she starred in Romantik Komedi (2010), Dedektif Memoli (2011), as Aylin Youlin in Çocuklar Duymasın (2012), and as special guest star Melda in Bir Erkek Bir Kadın (2013), Turkish adaptation of the French-language Canadian comedy television series Un gars, une fille.

Burcu Esmersoy has been the face of a variety of advertising campaigns. Since her debut, she has also appeared in numerous magazine covers, articles, and editorials across Turkey.

== Early life and education ==
Esmersoy was born in Istanbul to parents of Circassian descent whose parents were from Egypt. In an interview in 2020, Esmersoy revealed that she had been physically abused and beaten by her father in her childhood, who would hit her with a hose. Her parents divorced as her father's affair with another woman came to light. Following her mother's second marriage, Esmersoy and her sister were forced to refer to their mother as 'aunt' instead of 'mom' and became distanced from her as they moved in with their paternal grandparents.

After finishing her secondary studies at Beşiktaş Lisesi, a prestigious high school located on the European side of Istanbul, she enrolled in the Tourism Management Department of the Faculty of Business Management at Istanbul University. Following her graduation, she went on to study Hospitality, Tourism, and Sports Management at Tisch Center, New York University School of Professional Studies.

In addition to her full-time studies, Burcu Esmersoy took part in Barbara Poitier's performing art workshops at Istanbul Bilgi University. She is also an alumna of Dialog Anlatım İletişim.

Besides Turkish, Burcu Esmersoy speaks average English and Italian.

== Career ==
In 1997, she was placed third runner-up at the Miss Turkey beauty pageant. The same year she represented Turkey at Miss International in Tokyo, Japan where she won the "Miss Friendship" title. She began her broadcasting career in a children's programme aired on Kanal D and joined CNN Türk's Sports News in 2000 and worked there until 2005 as sports presenter, coordinator as well as foreign news editor. In April 2006, she joined NTV MSNBC and started presenting the Spor Servisi programme.

She competed in the first season of the reality show Dancing with the Stars (2010–2011) and hosted the second season (2011–2012) of the same competition. In 2013, she hosted Popstar, based on the British television music competition Pop Idol. She also hosted TV8's Ver Fırına, Turkish version of the British television baking competition The Great British Bake Off and co-hosted ATV's Elin Oğlu, based on the South Korean talk show Non-Summit.

== Personal life ==
On 28 February 2005, Burcu Esmersoy married Scuderia Ferrari Formula One's sponsorship and marketing manager Massimo Cusimano at the Turkish Consulate-General in Paris, France and later in Bologna on 28 October 2006. For a short span of time, Burcu Esmersoy lived in Maranello, Emilia-Romagna which is the home of Ferrari S.p.A. The couple divorced in 2008. From May 2018 to September 2019, Esmersoy was married to Berk Suyabatmaz. In September 2023, she married computer game designer Nazım Akmandil.

== Filmography ==
=== Film ===
Year	Title	Role	Notes
2010	Romantic Comedy	Ezgi	
2012	The Pirates! In an Adventure with Scientists!	Surprisingly Curvaceous Pirate	Voice in Turkish

=== Television ===
Year	Title	Role	Notes
2004–2005	Spor Ekspres	Sports announcer and commentator	
2006	Burcu Esmersoy'la Spor Servisi	Sports announcer, commentator, and host	
2009–2011	Summer Night Show	Co-host	
2010–2011	Dancing with the Stars (season 1)	Celebrity competitor	
2011–2012	Dancing with the Stars (season 2)	Host	
2011	Dedektif Memoli	Agent Zeyno	10 episodes
2011	Late Summer Night with Burcu Esmersoy	Host	
2012	Survivor	Host	Season 6
2012	Çocuklar Duymasın	Aylin Youlin	
2012–2014	Nedir Ne Değildir	Host	137 episodes
2013	Popstar	Host	
2013	Bir Erkek Bir Kadın	Melda (as special guest star)	Episode 105
2013–2014	Spor Gecesi	Co-host	
2013–2014	En Güzel Bölüm	Host	Over 500 episodes
2014	Arkadaşım Hoş Geldin	Herself (as special guest star)	
2014–2015	Ver Fırına	Host	
2015	Komedi Türkiye	Host	
2015–2016	Elin Oğlu	Co-host	
2017	Dünya Güzellerim	Host	
2019	Dünya Avucunuzda	Host	
2019–	Burcu ile Hafta Sonu	Host	
