= Burak Yamantürk =

Turkish actor (born 1983)

- Born: 23 December 1983 (age 42); İzmit, Kocaeli, Turkey
- Occupation: Actor
- Years active: 2010–present
- Spouse: Özge Özpirinçci (m. 2021)
- Children: 1

Burak Yamantürk (born 23 December 1983) is a Turkish actor.

Yamantürk was born on 23 December 1983 in İzmit. He first studied submarine technologies and received diving lessons, afterwards deciding to pursue a career in acting. He began studying at the Istanbul State Opera and Ballet and eventually graduated from Mimar Sinan University with a degree in modern dancing.

He made his debut with a small role in the 2011 movie Ayhan Hanım, which was eventually released in 2014. In 2012, he made his television debut with the period series Veda based on a novel, in which he portrayed the character of Kemal alongside Fahriye Evcen. He was cast in period series "Tatar Ramazan" remake of film with his wife Özge Özpirinçci. He played in period series "Yasak" based on Fatma Aliye Hanım's novel Muharadat. In 2015, he joined the cast of Acı Aşk. He also had a recurring role in the 2020 mini period drama Ya İstiklal Ya Ölüm. With Acı Aşk's co-star Seçkin Özdemir, Ya İstiklal Ya Ölüm's co-star Melis Sezen, he played in Sevgili Geçmiş for twice.

== Filmography ==
Film
Year	Title	Role	Notes
2010	Ayhan Hanım		released in 2014
2014	Böcek		
Web Series
Year	Title	Role	Notes
2020	Ya İstiklal Ya Ölüm	Hayati	
2022	Aslında Özgürsün	Erkan	
2022	Kuş Uçuşu	Selim	
Tv Series
Year	Title	Role	Notes
2012	Veda	Kemal	
2013–14	Tatar Ramazan	Elmas Mercan	
2014	Hayat Yolunda	Op. Dr. Selim Savaş	
2014	Yasak	Nejat	
2015	Acı Aşk	Mehmet	ep 8th
2017	İçimdeki Fırtına	Fırat	
2017	Kayıt Dışı	Arda	
2019	Sevgili Geçmiş	Kenan Soykan	
2021	Elbet Bir Gün	Mehmet Kılıçlı	
