= A Bright World =

- Genre: talk-variety show
- Presented by: Peng Yu, Shen Ling, Liu Yan, Yu Shasha
- Opening theme: Shut Up and Dance by Walk the Moon (season 2)
- Ending theme: Back For You by One Direction (season 1); Your Makeup Is Terrible by Alaska (season 2)
- Country of origin: China
- Original language: Chinese
- No. of seasons: 2

Production
- Production location: China
- Running time: 65 minutes

Original release
- Network: Jiangsu Television
- Release: April 16, 2015 – April 13, 2017

A Bright World (Chinese: 世界青年说; pinyin: shìjiè qīngnián shuō) was a Chinese talk show based on the popular South Korean talk show Non-Summit. It aired on Jiangsu Television on Thursday at 22:00 beginning April 16, 2015. The show hosts a panel of foreigners living in China, holding discussions in Mandarin on various topics and issues. The atmosphere is meant to emulate a meeting of world leaders, but presented with humor.

The panel consisted of a "Secretary General" (Chinese: 秘书长; pinyin: Mìshūzhǎng), a "Vice Secretary General" (Chinese: 副秘书长; pinyin: Fù mìshūzhǎng), and 11 "representatives" from different countries known as TK11. In Season 1, there were 11 TK11 representatives. In Season 2, there were 16 TK11 representatives. Every episode 11 of them sit in the middle, and the other 5 sit in the audience area.

== Series overview ==
Season	Episodes	Originally released	
Season	Episodes	First released	Last released
1	46	April 16, 2015	March 10, 2016
2	27	September 29, 2016	April 13, 2017

== Representatives ==
=== Current representatives ===
Country	Name	Chinese name	Birthday	Start	Absences
United States	Martin Wiley Woods Jr.	吴孟天	August 16, 1989 (age 36)	S1 E1	S1 E3, 4
United Kingdom	Blair Sugarman	布莱尔·休格曼	June 18, 1989 (age 36)	S1 E1	S1 E43
Italy	Mattia Romeo	罗密欧	November 23, 1978 (age 46)	S1 E1	
Australia	Cameron Andersen	安龙	October 27, 1983 (age 41)	S1 E1	S1 E17, 18, 39, 40
Iran	Pouya Amani	普雅·阿玛尼	June 26, 1997 (age 28)	S1 E1	
Russia	David Kolosov	大卫·克罗索夫	January 9, 1993 (age 32)	S1 E1	
Thailand	Muangphum Harnsiripetch	韩冰	March 27, 1986 (age 39)	S1 E1	
Costa Rica	Isaac Peña Morales	穆雷	August 24, 1988 (age 37)	S1 E1	S1 E17, 18
Germany	Patrick Köllmer	吴雨翔	September 16, 1988 (age 37)	S1 E1	
Japan	Shinji Kuroki	黑木真二	July 29, 1983 (age 42)	S2 E1	
Germany	Thomas Derksen	阿福	October 26, 1988 (age 36)	S2 E1	
Australia	David Gulasi	戴维		S2 E1	
Brazil	Tordan Ferreira	费丹尼		S2 E1	
Israel	Raz Galor	高佑思	September 28, 1994 (age 31)	S2 E1	
Turkey	Oguzhan Taşdemir	欧赞	September 18, 1991 (age 34)	S2 E1	
Republic of the Congo; France	Gaive Junior	朱礼		S2 E1	
Haiti	Marcus Bo	克罗德		S2	

=== Past Representatives ===
Country	Name	Chinese name	Birthday	Episodes
Canada	James Alofs	詹姆斯·奥夫斯	September 26, 1986 (age 39)	S1 E1 - S1 E46
South Korea	Han Dong-su	韩东秀	January 27, 1990 (age 35)	S1 E1 - S1 E46

=== Guest Representatives ===
Country	Name	Chinese name	Birthday	Episodes
France	Antoine Brunel	安闹闹	December 24, 1979 (age 45)	S1 E3
Zimbabwe	Michael Mashakada	马正桦	January 24, 1991 (age 34)	S1 E4
Japan	Shinji Kuroki	黑木真二	July 29, 1983 (age 42)	S1 E17, 18, 29 – 34, 37
France	Pascal Bonnisseau	宋博宁	July 2, 1981 (age 44)	S1 E17, 18, 35, 38, 40, 41, 43
United States	Jonathan Kott	江喃		S1 E26
South Korea	Kim Chae-kyung	金采景	1983 – 1984	S1 E39
United States		边斌	1987 – 1988	S1 E39
Mali	Michael	马豆	1991 – 1992	S1 E39
United Kingdom		康可	1994 – 1995	S1 E39
Thailand; India	Siwathep Singh Khanderpor	天乐	1992 – 1993	S1 E39, 40, 42
Germany	Rocaius	罗凯世	1986 – 1987	S1 E40
United States	Tyler	铁蛋儿	1982 – 1983	S1 E40
New Zealand	Laurence Larson	罗艺恒	March 4, 1994 (age 31)	S1 E40

== Similar Shows ==
=== South Korean shows ===
Non-summit is the original show.

In 2015, a Non-summit spin-off aired.

=== Turkish franchise ===
In 2014, atv purchased the rights for a Turkish adaptation of Non-Summit, titled Elİn Oğlu, which premiered on 21 March 2015.

=== Chinese franchises ===
Informal Talks (非正式会谈) is a Chinese adaptation of Non-Summit, broadcast on Hubei Television. It began its second season in December, 2015.
