= Elin Oğlu =

- Genre: Talk-variety show
- Presented by: Burcu Esmersoy (2015–2016); Ömür Varol (2015); Sinan Çalışkanoğlu (2015–2016)
- Country of origin: Turkey
- Original language: Turkish
- No. of seasons: 1
- No. of episodes: 52

Production
- Production location: Turkey
- Running time: 60 minutes

Original release
- Network: atv
- Release: 21 March 2015 – 7 May 2016

Elin Oğlu was a Turkish talk show broadcast on ATV. Based on the original South Korean show Non-Summit, it aired on ATV on Saturday nights at 23:45 Eastern European Time from 21 March 2015 to 7 May 2016.

The show was hosted by leading Turkish television personality Burcu Esmersoy and actor Sinan Çalışkanoğlu.

== Members ==
Country	Name	Birth date	Career
Italy	Danilo Zanna	15 April 1982 (age 44)	Chef
Japan	Masataka Kobayashi	8 May 1986 (age 40)	Translator
Russia	Andrey Polyanin	27 April 1987 (age 39)	Model
Slovakia	Emrach Uskovski	7 July 1992 (age 34)	Model
South Korea	Chaby Han (Çabi) / Han Chang-yub	15 June 1992 (age 34)	Law
Spain	Manuel Reina	24 August 1972 (age 53)	Dancer
United Kingdom	Robbie-Lee Valentine	21 February 1984 (age 42)	Public Relations
United States	Antonio J. Stokes	23 August 1978 (age 47)	Teacher

== Past members ==
Country	Name	Birth date	Career
Senegal	Medoune Niang	14 December 1984 (age 41)	Model
United States	Allen Hulsey	8 February 1985 (age 41)	Singer
Poland	Monika Bulanda	13 April 1983 (age 43)	Singer

== Similar Shows ==
=== Korean shows ===
Non-Summit is the original show.

In 2015, a Non-Summit spin-off with the same actors aired.

=== Turkish franchise ===
In 2014, ATV purchased the rights for a Turkish adaptation of Non-Summit, titled Elin Oğlu, which premiered on 21 March 2015.

=== Chinese franchises ===
In 2015, Jiangsu Television purchased the rights for a Chinese adaptation of Non-Summit, titled A Bright World (世界青年说), which premiered on 16 April 2015.

Informal Talks (非正式会谈) is a Chinese adaptation of Non-Summit, broadcast on Hubei Television. It began its second season in December, 2015.
