= Son of the Sun =

- Directed by: Onur Ünlü
- Starring: Haluk Bilginer; Özgü Namal
- Release date: 7 November 2008
- Running time: 1h 29min
- Country: Turkey
- Language: Turkish

Son of the Sun (Turkish: Güneşin Oğlu) is a 2008 Turkish comedy film directed by Onur Ünlü.

== Cast ==
- Haluk Bilginer - Alper Canan
- Özgü Namal - Sule
- Köksal Engür - Fikri Semsigil
- Bülent Emin Yarar - Kurban Murat
- Hümeyra - Saadet Semsigil
- Tansu Biçer - Burak
- Ahmet Kural - Ahmet
- Görkem Yeltan - Cahide Canan
