= Ferit Aktuğ =

Turkish actor (born 1978)

- Born: Mustafa Ferit Aktuğ; 17 November 1978 (age 47); Ankara, Turkey
- Education: Dokuz Eylül University
- Occupations: Actor, presenter
- Years active: 2002–present

Mustafa Ferit Aktuğ (born 17 November 1978) is a Turkish actor and TV presenter.

== Career ==
He began his acting career in 2002 with the character Aslan in the television series Koçum Benim, which began airing on TRT 1. He had his first experience in cinema in the 2004 film Mustafa Hakkında Her Şey, directed by Çağan Irmak. He subsequently appeared in the television series Kampüsistan and Haziran Gecesi.

Between 2007 and 2011, he played the character Metin Kaygısız in the television series Kavak Yelleri. He subsequently played Mahir in the series Aramızda Kalsın, Genco in Kördüğüm, and Taylan Kaner in Ufak Tefek Cinayetler. In addition to his television and cinema work, he also appeared in various commercials.

In 2019, he appeared in the theatrical play Timsah, staged by DasDas. In 2020, he played the character Selim in the film Eltilerin Savaşı, which was released that year. In the same year, he hosted the game show Şans Kapıyı Çalınca, which began airing on atv and was adapted from the Japanese-origin format Happy Family Plan.

In 2021, he joined the cast of the series Sefirin Kızı, playing the character Bora.

In 2022, he played the character Ali Kaya in the television series Ah Nerede, adapted from the 1975 film of the same name.

Between 2023 and 2024, he played Murat Erden in the series Bambaşka Biri, and in 2024, he played the character Tevfik Moralı in the series Arka Sokaklar.

In 2025, he appeared before audiences on digital platforms as Selim in the series Antrenör and as the character Ahmet in the series Fer.

In 2026, he played the character Prof. Dr. Ekin Kurtulan, chief of neuropsychiatry, in the series Doktor: Başka Hayatta, which began airing on NOW and was adapted from the Italian series Doc - Nelle tue mani.

== Filmography ==
=== TV series ===
- Evlilik Güzeldir - 2026 - Ali Rıza
- Doktor: Başka Hayatta - 2026 - Ekin
- Fer - 2025 - Ahmet
- Antrenör - 2025 - Selim
- Arka Sokaklar - 2024 - Tevfik Moralı
- Bambaşka Biri - 2023–2024 - Murat
- Ah Nerede - 2022 - Ali
- Sefirin Kızı - 2021 - Bora
- Şans Kapıyı Çalınca (yarışma) - 2020 - Sunucu
- Ufak Tefek Cinayetler - 2017–2018 - Taylan
- Kördüğüm - 2016 - Genco
- Aramızda Kalsın - 2013–2015 - Mahir
- Yamak Ahmet - 2011–2012 - Ferhat
- Mazi Kalbimde Yaradır - 2011 - Kerem
- Kavak Yelleri - 2007–2011 - Metin Kaygısız
- Büyük Buluşma -
- Haziran Gecesi - Tarık
- Kampüsistan - 2003–2004 - Mehmet
- Koçum Benim - 2002–2003 - Aslan

=== Film ===
- Beyaz Eşya, 2024
- Aile Çıkmazı, 2024
- Hatıran Yeter, 2024
- Merve Kült, 2023
- Oregon, 2023
- Kendi Yolumda, 2022
- Kim Bu Aile?, 2022
- Eltilerin Savaşı, 2020
- Düğün Dernek 2: Sünnet, 2015
- Kadın İşi: Banka Soygunu, 2014
- Evdeki Yabancılar, 2012
- Mustafa Hakkında Herşey, 2003

== Theatre ==
Theatre
Year	Title	Role	Venue	Position
2018	Timsah		DasDas	Actor
2023	Münasebetsiz		Akatlar Culture Center	Actor
2024	The Wasp (Yaban Arısı)		Koma Sahnesi	Director

== Awards and nominations ==
Awards
Year	Organization	Category	Work	Result	Reference
2022	48th Golden Butterfly Awards	Best Male Romantic Comedy Actor	Ah Nerede	Nominated	
2024	25th Sadri Alışık Theatre and Cinema Actors Awards	Most Successful Male Actor of the Year in the Comedy or Black Comedy Category	Oregon	Nominated	
