= Aşk Yeniden =

Turkish television series

- Genre: Romantic comedy
- Created by: Ramazan Demirli
- Written by: Eda Tezcan; Gülbike Sonay Üte; Ramazan Demirli
- Directed by: Ersoy Güler
- Starring: Özge Özpirinçci; Buğra Gülsoy
- Country of origin: Turkey
- Original language: Turkish
- No. of seasons: 2
- No. of episodes: 59

Production
- Executive producer: Ali Gündoğdu
- Producers: İnci Gündoğdu; İsmail Gündoğdu
- Production locations: Turkey (Istanbul, Çamlıhemşin and Sivas) United States
- Running time: 110 minutes
- Production company: Süreç Film

Original release
- Network: Fox
- Release: February 10, 2015 – June 14, 2016

Aşk Yeniden (transl. Love Again) is a Turkish romantic comedy television series produced by Süreç Film starring Özge Özpirinçci and Buğra Gülsoy. It premiered on Fox on February 10, 2015, to June 14, 2016.

== Plot ==
Zeynep is a headstrong and bold girl living in Istanbul with her fisherman father Şevket, who loves his daughter unconditionally. Zeynep falls in love with a guy named Ertan Sönmez, and later leaves her home to elope with him to America. They live quite happily in that continent until Zeynep discovers of being pregnant, but Ertan asks her to abort the baby. Zeynep refuses to kill her baby, so Ertan leaves her. Heartbroken, Zeynep soon breaks down and gives birth to a baby boy, Selim. But, she comes back to Turkey after 10 months as she unable to living with a baby and surviving in a foreign land.

On the other hand, Fatih Şekercizade, who belongs to a well-established and elite family of Turkey, had been facing the pressure of being from an elite family from his arrogant and snot-nosed mother Mukaddes, who happens to be making his decisions from his childhood and has betrothed him to İrem, the girl of her own choice. In order to have a peaceful and free life, Fatih had escaped to America with the excuse of studying. In America, he falls in love with Summer, who then denies his proposal at the end. A heartbroken Fatih decides to return to Turkey. While in the flight, due to a turbulence, Fatih and Zeynep ran into one another. Fatih, who doesn't want to marry İrem, offers Zeynep to pretend to be his wife and Selim to be his son in front of his family so that he would be able to settle his issue for sometime. On the other hand, Zeynep, who was also worried about telling her father about her baby and Ertan, agrees it as Fatih agrees to pretend as Selim's father.

After arriving at İstanbul, they visit Fatih's wealthy family first, where Fatih introduces Zeynep to his family. His family members consist of his parents Fehmi and Mukaddes, his younger sister Selin and his paternal grandmother Gülsüm Şekercizade. Fatih's family accepts Zeynep and her son after a short while, except for Fatih's mother, Mukaddes, who hates Zeynep and Selim more than anything else and plans to kick her out of Fatih's life at any cost. On the other hand, Zeynep also introduces Fatih to her family - a middle-class family consisting of her father Şevket, her paternal aunt Yadigar and her cousins, Orhan and Elifsu. At first the family members seem to be hesitant, however, later they come to accept Fatih. However, Şevket, who seemed to be upset with Zeynep as she had left him, takes his anger out on Fatih by ordering his nephew Orhan to abduct Selin. Orhan, who happens to obey every order from his uncle, abducts Selin and both get married against Selin's will. However, this creates a rift between both families for a while, but then the issues get settled and the families eventually start to accept each other.

Zeynep and Fatih gradually start to understand one another more every day after Zeynep confesses her past with Ertan to Fatih. Orhan and Selin genuinely fall in love with each another. Mete and Fadik (the respective best friends of Fatih and Zeynep) also given them all support in every manner. As the story moves on, Fatih develops a loving relationship with Selim and starts to consider him as his own son and falls in love with Zeynep. They stay happy until Zeynep's long-lost mother Meryem (whom Zeynep thought to be dead) returns from Europe as a business tycoon. Upon learning this, Şevket tries to keep her away from Meryem as he misunderstood that Meryem left them for another man. Meryem tries to purchase the business of Fatih's family, but gives up when she discovers that Fatih is Zeynep's husband and that Zeynep is her daughter. Meryem then tries to reconcile with Zeynep by befriending her first as an employer and Şevket informs Meryem's truth to Fatih, who helps him to keep Meryem away from Zeynep in order to preserve her happiness. Meryem soon informs Şevket how she always loved her family and how she was threatened to leave her family and had to leave with a man. This reunites Şevket and Meryem, and Şevket reveals Meryem's truth to Zeynep who gets shocked and stays away from her "lying" parents for a while. Soon, she leaves Fatih after she finds that Fatih also being involved with this. However, Fatih tries to explain himself in every way, but she simply refuses to listen to him. Upon realizing her mistake, Zeynep apologizes for him. Fatih later proposes to Zeynep and decides to genuinely marry in secret. However, Zeynep feels quite guilty upon hiding the reality from their loved ones and families and convinces Fatih to tell the truth to both families, which they eventually do. After that, Fatih's family disowns Zeynep and Selim, leading to Fatih disowning his family, surname and legacy for Zeynep and Selim. On the other side, Şevket encourages his daughter of being strong by giving birth to Selim and Fatih as being a true human. Fatih and Zeynap then move in to Zeynep's family.

Since the family was middle-class with so many people living under the same roof, including the neighbors Ayfer and her daughters Fadik and Saziment, Fatih had to compromise his lifestyle and find a job to meet Zeynep's and Selim's needs. Moreover, upon realizing the selfish behavior of her family (mostly from Mukaddes) towards Fatih and Zeynep, Selin also decides to leave home and moves in with Zeynep's family. The home becomes a livelihood of so many people living together and proves to be a heaven for Fatih and Selin in a short time. With time, Zeynep also develops a healthy relationship with her parents. Meryem also leaves her villa and moves in with the family. Time passes, and the family stays happy, until Vahit enters their life. Vahit's ego believes that Meryem had poisoned his brother in order to get his business, abducts Zeynep and poisons her. Upon being discovered, Zeynep is found poisoned and was rushed to hospital from where everyone try to find the antidote as soon. However, they cannot convince Vahit for the antidote until Ertan shows up with the antidote. Zeynep is saved, and Şevket thanks him greatly. Ertan tries to win Zeynep over again, not knowing that he is Selim's biological father. However, Fatih's family realizes their mistake and braces Zeynap and Selim as their own. Zeynep and Fatih get marry on the same day with Orhan and Selin. Mukaddes, however, had somehow found the truth about Ertan's paternal tie with Selim and blackmails Zeynep into leaving Fatih under the threat of publicly revealing the truth about Ertan's son.

Zeynep and Fatih soon come up with a plan: they pretend to be quarrelling and then fake a divorce, this time in front of even their best friends and families, thus stopping Mukaddes from creating future troubles for them. The couple then "fights" in front of everybody and "divorces" one another. Upon learning about the "divorce" and Zeynep leaving the Şekercizade villa, Mukaddes becomes so happy that almost forgets Ertan, while on the other hand, both families fall into deep sadness. While both the families are grieving, Mukaddes asks Fatih to remarry somebody with her choice this time, but Fatih comes up with a lie of having a secret lover and thus having cheated on Zeynep in order to escape his mother's grasp, thus adding more happiness for Mukaddes. Now, the couple decides to find somebody to pretend to be Fatih's lover and thus reaches Şaziment. Though Şaziment had been the part of Zeynep's family but since she had never left her room in years therefore nobody in Fatih's family had seen her before, also Şaziment had proven to be trustworthy for Zeynep and Fatih, who then try to convince her to work with them by first letting her know their secret. Şaziment finally agrees by pretending to be an American-Turkish girl named Melissa who had come from New York to "marry" Fatih.

== Cast ==
- Özge Özpirinçci as Zeynep Taşkın Şekercizade – Şevket's and Meryem's daughter; Orhan's and Elif Su's cousin; Fatih's wife; Ertan's ex-fiancée; Selim's and Jr. Gülsüm's mother
- Buğra Gülsoy as Fatih Şekercizade – Fehmi's and Mukaddes' older son; Selin's older brother; Zeynep's husband; Selim's adopted father; Jr. Gülsüm's biological father
- Tamer Levent as Şevket Taşkın – Yadigar's older brother; Meryem's husband; Zeynep's father; Orhan's and Elif Su's uncle; Selim's and Jr. Gülsüm's maternal grandfather
- Sema Keçik as Meryem Taşkın – Şevket's wife; Zeynep's mother; Orhan's and Elif Su's aunt; Şekercizades' business tycoon
- Tülin Oral as Gülsüm Şekercizade – Fehmi's mother; Fatih's and Selin's paternal grandmother; Şekercizade's family matriarch
- Lale Başar as Mukaddes Şekercizade – Fehmi's wife; Fatih's and Selin's mother; Mukaddar's younger sister; Selim's and Jr. Gülsüm's paternal grandmother
- Tuna Arman as Mukaddar Şekercizade – Mukaddes's older sister; Fatih's and Selin's maternal aunt
- Orhan Alkaya as Fehmi Șekercizade – Gülsüm's son; Mukaddes's husband; Fatih's and Selin's father
- Yağiz Yiğit Sayın as Selim Şekercizade – Zeynep's and Ertan's son; Fatih's adoptive son; Jr. Gülsüm's half-brother
- Nilay Deniz as Selin Şekercizade Günay – Fehmi's and Mukaddes's younger daughter; Fatih's younger sister; Orhan's wife and mother to his child
- Nazlı Tosunoğlu as Yadigar Taşkın Günay – Şevket's younger sister; Orhan's and Elif Su's mother; Ayfer's neighbor and best friend
- Can Sipahi as Orhan Günay – Yadigar's older son; Elif Su's older brother; Zeynep's cousin; Selin's husband and eventual father to her child; Şevket's and Meryem's nephew
- Su Burcu Yazgı Coşkun as Elif Su Günay – Yadigar's younger daughter; Orhan's younger sister; Zeynep's cousin; Sevket's and Meryem's niece
- Mert Öcal as Ertan Sönmez – Zeynep's ex-fiancé; Selim's biological father
- Esin Gündogdu as Ayfer Servermez – Yadigar's friend and neighbor; Darbeli Haydar's eventual wife; Fadik's and Șaziment's mother
- Miray Akovalıgil as Șaziment Servermez – Ayfer's elder daughter; Fadik's sister; Birol's wife
- İlkem Ulugün as Fadik Servermez – Ayfer's younger daughter; Șaziment's sister; Zeynep's childhood friend; Mete's wife
- Emre Erkan as Mete – Fatih's childhood friend; Fadik's husband
- Barış Yalçın as Birol Ergureli – Meryem's right-hand man and business associate; Șaziment's husband
- Murat Kocacık as Darbeli Haydar – a local kingpin; Ayfer's eventual second husband; Șaziment's and Fadik's stepfather
- Mazhar Alican Uğur as Mustafa Soför – Fatih's right-hand man, chauffeur and bodyguard
- Fatma Karanfil as Hacer – Fatih's and Selin's babysitter
- Mert Öner as Cevat – Şevket's employee and bodyguard
- Tevfik İnceoğlu as Kamil – Şevket's employee and bodyguard
- Tunca Aydoğan as Vahit – Şevket's and Meryem's enemy
- Yakup Yavru as Ethem – Şevket's friend
- Didem Soydan as İrem Şencan – Fatih's childhood friend and to-be bride

== International broadcasts ==
Country	Network	Premiere date	Original name
Afghanistan	One TV	April 21, 2018	Ezdewaje janjali
Bangladesh	Deepto TV	2024	Bhalobasha Fire Elo
Poland	TV Puls	August 13, 2015 (season 1), August 13, 2018 (season 2)	Kontrakt na miłość
Slovakia	TV Doma	January 11, 2016	Láska na druhý pokus
Romania	Acasă TV	November 17, 2016	Dragoste cu împrumut
North Macedonia	Kanal 5	December 12, 2016	Љубов (Love)
Latvia	LNT	February 2, 2017	Iemīlēties vēlreiz
Chile	Canal 13	February 6, 2017	Amor a segunda vista
Montenegro	Pink M	March 20, 2017	Ponovo zaljubljeni
Serbia	RTV Pink; Pink 2	March 29, 2017	Ponovo zaljubljeni
Mexico	Imagen TV	March 7, 2017	Volver a amar
Bosnia and Herzegovina	Pink BH	April 28, 2017	Ponovo zaljubljeni
Lithuania	TV3 Lithuania / TV8	May 4, 2017	Pamilti vėl
Tunisia	Nessma TV	September 11, 2017	Hobek Darbani
Ukraine	1+1	November 20, 2017	Я знову тебе кохаю
Peru	Andina de Televisión	January 15, 2018	Volver a amar
Croatia	Nova TV	June 11, 2018	Začin ljubavi
Bulgaria	bTV bTV Lady	November 16, 2018; May 10, 2020	Любов от втори опит
United States	Telemundo Univision	2017 2021	Volver a amar Locos Por Amor
