= İpek Yaylacıoğlu =

Turkish actress

- Born: 31 July 1984 (age 42); Istanbul, Turkey

Comedy career
- Years active: 2003–present
- Genres: Actress, Model

İpek Yaylacıoğlu Usta (born 31 July 1984) is a Turkish actress from Istanbul. Her grandmother is of Bosnian descent.

Between 2009-2019, she played as Pınar in police series Arka Sokaklar which one of the longest Turkish series. The four actresses played Pınar role in series. Also, She is best known for role Eda in the Kardeş Payı hit comedy series and Kavak Yelleri Turkish adaptation of Dawson's Creek.

She starred in the TV series Senden başka and appeared in the movie Başka Semtin Çocukları. She was cast in series Ihlamurlar Altında, Elif, Çemberin Dışında.

== Filmography ==
=== Film ===
- Başka Semtin Çocukları, 2008

=== Television ===
- Ihlamurlar Altında, 2005–2007
- Senden Başka, 2007
- Elif, 2008
- Çemberin Dışında , 2008
- Kavak Yelleri, 2009
- Arka Sokaklar, Third Pınar, 2009–2019
- Kardeş Payı, 2014–2015
