= Düğün Dernek =

- Film poster
- Directed by: Selçuk Aydemir
- Written by: Selçuk Aydemir
- Produced by: Necati Akpınar
- Starring: Murat Cemcir; Ahmet Kural; Rasim Öztekin; Devrim Yakut; Jelena Boliç; Barış Yıldız; Burak Satıbol; Şinasi Yurtsever; İnan Ulaş Torun; Zerrin Sümer; Kemal İnci; Erol Aksoy; Reyhan İlhan
- Edited by: Çağrı Türkkan
- Music by: Aytekin Ataş
- Distributed by: UIP Türkiye
- Release date: 6 December 2013
- Country: Turkey
- Language: Turkish
- Budget: ₺ 3,000,000
- Box office: ₺ 68,917,965

Düğün Dernek (translated as "Wedding Association") is a Turkish comedy film produced in 2013. The film was written by Selçuk Aydemir and produced by BKM. Ahmet Kural, Murat Cemcir, Rasim Öztekin, Devrim Yakut and Barış Yıldız star in the film. The plot of the movie is about Ismail's (who lives in Sivas) efforts to help his son Tarık with his wedding, and the comedic escapades that ensues from it. The film was released in 258 theaters in Turkey on 6 December 2013. In the first 3 days it was watched by 572,838 people and made ₺5,947,213 in revenue. In the first quarter of 2014, it took the "most watched film of the past 30 years" title from Fetih 1453. The film mostly got good feedback but some of the reviewers thought the chemistry between Murat Cemcir and Ahmet Kural was forced and the move was a slapstick comedy that was hard to be taken seriously.

== Plot ==
In a voice-over, Tarik, Ismail's son, comes home from abroad to visit his parents' home in Sivas. When he comes back to Sivas to receive his father's blessing, Ismail decides to have a wedding for his son; as the village tradition is for a man to have his son circumcised, joined the Turkish Army, and give his son a wedding.

Ismail takes it as a matter of pride that the wedding is big and grand, and makes magnificent wedding plans with his odd-ball friends: Tüpçü Fikret (a "gas-man" owner), Çetin (a boxing instructor to children), and the teacher of the village (Saffet). They have ten days to make the wedding happen.

Fikret said he has an old Army friend who now owns a ritzy hotel that they can host the wedding at, but it does not go as planned. Saffet claims to be related to a Turkish star, Emel Sayın and can get her for the wedding entertainment, but she ignores his calls; and Çetin volunteers his old mother to make the dresses and food, but each assigned task by the four friends fall through one-by-one; including a scheme that involves the village conman, Yılmaz, making fake currency.

However, Ismail's wife, Hatice and the other women of the village all come together after the friends realize that they need help. Hatice also persuades Ismail to invite his estranged older brother to the wedding, despite having a falling out with each other. The preparations for the wedding starts at the center of the village, with everyone helping out as a community.

On the wedding day, Ismail requests a camel for the bride, Marika, to ride on, as he says it's part of the village tradition, so Yılmaz gets a camel somehow to the surprise of everyone. The camel takes off with the bride though, and gets accidentally knocked out when she falls off of it.

The men bring the unconscious Marika back to the wedding celebration, where they hide her away from the guests and the groom. The wedding ceremony is about to begin and Marika is still unconscious, so Yılmaz wears her gown and veil to pretend to be the bride, because he's the only one who fits in the dress.

All is going well until Ismail's brother dies after eating a piece of Çetin's cake that he made. He gets carried into the same room that Marika is in, as does his deceased wife, who also drops dead after learning from Saffet that her husband just died. Çetin wonders if his cake is poisonous because two people died after eating it.

Marika's friend/bridesmaid calls her boyfriend, Victors, in Latvia to tell him everything worked out as planned, and it is revealed that Marika is actually engaged to someone else and eloped with Tarik instead. The real fiance and Marika's brothers goes to Sivas to bring Marika back.

Upon finding out what happened, Yılmaz, Tarık and the bridesmaid escapes the wedding when the group shows up. Yilmaz reveals his identity, which causes the bridesmaid to start freaking out and Yılmaz knocks her unconscious; eventually the three of them are able to escape the group when Çetin shows up and beats everyone up with his boxing skills.

They return to the celebration, now with two unconscious women and two dead bodies in a room, and Yılmaz in a wedding gown. Hatice shows up and deduces everything that has happened and tells everyone to handle it and not cause a scene in front of the guests.

The police arrive because of Yılmaz's fake currency, which Ismail had thrown out to the children during the wedding celebration. Everyone is taken in for questioning and Tarık reads out bits of his statements, which is the voice-over in the beginning of the movie.

The movie ends with Ismail saying goodbye to Tarık and handing him an envelope with money, telling him to have another wedding since the one Ismail gave him was such a disaster. He also gives him the key to his lime green car. They embrace each other and Tarık and his friends drive off.

== Release ==
The film released in 258 theaters and with 229 copies in Turkey. It was watched by 572,838 people. On the 12th week, it was watched by 6,600,893 people and got "the most viewed film" title in Turkish cinema. It was shown in theaters for 29 weeks and watched by 6,961,909 people in total, grossing ₺68,917,965 in revenue.
