= Yahşi Cazibe =

- Also known as: Beautiful Cazibe
- Created by: Gani Müjdes
- Written by: Gani Müjde
- Directed by: Bora Onur
- Starring: Hakan Yılmaz; Sinan Çalışkanoğlu; Aslıhan Gürbüz; Gökçe Özyol; Sezai Aydın; Hande Katipoğlu Seyhun
- Composers: Cenk Durmazel; Cenk Sarkuş
- Country of origin: Turkey
- Original language: Turkish
- No. of seasons: 2
- No. of episodes: 93

Production
- Producer: Gani Müjde
- Production location: Istanbul Süreç studios
- Running time: 90 min.
- Production company: Süreç Film

Original release
- Network: ATV
- Release: 16 July 2010 – 16 June 2012

Yahşi Cazibe is a Turkish comedy series. Cazibe, an Azerbaijani immigrant, marries Kemal to become a Turkish citizen. "Ms. Gül" who deals with illegal marriages arranges this marriage which will last for 3 years according to the agreement. Kemal receives TL 15,000 from Cazibe. But Kemal has a girlfriend, Simge, who is the daughter of Kemal's boss. Kemal's boss does not know that Kemal and his daughter are in a relationship. Simge thinks that Cazibe is Kemal's maid. However Ejder is the foreign marriage detective and he is trying to find proof that Cazibe only married Kemal to become a Turkish Citizen.

Yahşi Cazibe was the most popular series in Turkey that is published by ATV. The final episode was aired on 16 June 2012.

The word "Yahşi" comes from Azerbaijani and means beautiful, good, nice. (in Turkish: güzel, iyi). "Cazibe" means seduction, charm.

Cast

Actor	Role	Explanations
Hakan Yılmaz	Kemal Kükreyen	He has too much debt. Married to Cazibe so she becomes a Turkish Citizen. But Kemal falls in love with Cazibe. Is stuck between Cazibe and Simge.
Aslıhan Gürbüz	Cazibə Abbasova	Born in Azerbaijan, she is married to Kemal. So that she can become a Turkish citizen. She loves Kemal.
Gökçe Özyol	Barış	Kemal's best friend. He's a dimwit and a funny character. He is also a perversive womanizer.
Hande Katipoğlu Seyhun	Simge	She's Kemal's girlfriend and Hulusi's daughter. She is very clumsy and snob. She doesn't know about Kemal's marriage. Kemal loves Simge but not as much as Cazibe.
Sinan Çalışkanoğlu	Ejder Taşkın	He's a detective in Foreigners Branch. Lives in the house across Kemal and Cazibe's.
Ege Kökenli	Itır Kükreyen	Kemal's daughter. She dresses in Gothic style. She dislikes Simge. She knows about the fake marriage of Kemal and Cazibe but she also knows that Cazibe loves Kemal a lot. She likes Cazibe.
Sezai Aydın	Hulusi	Kemal's boss and Simge's father. He doesn't want his daughter to be married and is unaware of Kemal being Simge's lover. He is famous with his quote I hate these three things in this life.
Serhan Arslan	Erdoğan	Kemal's and Cazibe's neighbour. Like Barış, he is a perversive womanizer. He is in love with Cazibe and dislikes Kemal, though this dislike is mutual. He often makes fun of Kemal and even improvises ridiculous songs about his bald and fat. Kemal calls him 'Hobbit'.
Erdal Türkmen	Ziverbey Ağaoğlu	He is a distant relative of Hulusi and works as the Director of Finance in Hulusi's company. Kemal strongly dislikes him. He is graduated from the university and often brags about it but he is not really intelligent. He is famous with his laughter. He is housemates with Erdoğan.
İnci Pars	Tutukunaz	Simge's best friend. Like Simge, she's rich, snob and clumsy. She has feelings towards Erdoğan.
