= Kardeş Payı =

- Genre: Comedy, science fiction, family
- Written by: Selçuk Aydemir; Çağlar Yurt; Onay Durgun; Murat Kaman; Emrah Kaman
- Directed by: Selçuk Aydemir
- Starring: Ahmet Kural; Murat Cemcir; Seda Bakan; Şinasi Yurtsever; Ayşe Kökçü; Ali İhsan Varol; İpek Yaylacıoğlu; Berfu Öngören; Sadık Gürbüz; Ayhan Taş; Korhan Herduran
- Narrated by: Devrim Yakut
- Theme music composer: Ahmet Kural; Murat Cemcir; Aytekin Ataş
- Country of origin: Turkey
- Original language: Turkish
- No. of seasons: 2
- No. of episodes: 35

Production
- Producer: Mehmet Yiğit Alp
- Running time: 70 minutes
- Production company: NTC Medya

Original release
- Network: Star TV
- Release: 13 February 2014 – 30 April 2015

Kardeş Payı is a Turkish television series produced by NTC Medya. The main characters are two brothers (Ahmet Kural and Murat Cemcir) and their sister (Seda Bakan). The two brothers are plumbers, however they are trying to invent an engine, working with boron or water. Their goal is to make the world a better place. The father of the characters is a fanatic fan of Besiktas and he gave the names of 3 legendary football players of Besiktas to his kids. Metin, Ali, Feyyaz. But surprisingly the third child was a girl so he changed the name of Feyyaz to "Feyyza". The first season started airing on 13 February 2014 on Star TV in Turkey and ended in June 2014. The second season started in January 2015 and made its finale on 30 April 2015.

== Production ==
The show is written and directed by Selçuk Aydemir, it is edited by Ali Kadı and produced by Mehmet Yiğit Alp's NTC Medya. The theme music "Kardeş Payı" is by Aytekin Ataş. It is airing on Thursday nights at 22:45 since February 13, 2014 on Star TV.

== Characters ==
Played by	Character	Description
Ahmet Kural	Metin Özdemir	Plumber. Runs 'Karapençe VIP' with his brother Ali. Has a crush for Eda.
Murat Cemcir	Ali Özdemir	Plumber. Runs 'Karapençe VIP' with his brother Metin. Cheated on his wife, got divorced and dropped from the high school.
Seda Bakan	Feyyza Özdemir	The youngest sibling who runs the house. The manager of a gas station.
Şinasi Yurtsever	Hilmi Kazmıkçı	The rich and egoistic inhabitant of the neighbourhood. Cheated on his wife 3 times, got divorced, has a child.
Rıza Akın	Tahsin Özdemir	The father of Metin, Ali and Feyyza and a retired engineer. A fanatic of Beşiktaş. Killed by one of his scientist friend who betrayed him in Episode 13.
Ayşe Kökçü	Hamiyet	The mother of Metin, Ali and Feyyza. Crazy about her children.
Ali İhsan Varol	Yiğit	The patent company's manager.
İpek Yaylacıoğlu	Eda	Pharmacist. Has a crush on Metin.
Sadık Gürbüz	Şerif	Metin and Ali's master. 87 years old, used to be a sweet grandpa. Then, he found 'the meaning of life' and became an alcohol addict.
Korhan Herduran	Oğuzhan	Ali and Metin's accountant.
Cemil Şahin	Kartal	Works at the gas station, where Feyyza works, sucks at his job.
Berfu Öngüren	Şükriye	Ali's ex-wife and Eda's elder sister.
Kadir Polatcı	Deniz	Works as the gas station where Feyyza works. Best friends with Kartal. Feyyza has a crush on him.
Emrah Kaman	Emrah	Eda's ex-lover and Metin's rival. Also one of the writers of the series. Hails from Divriği district of Sivas.
Ayhan Taş	Sezai	Car mechanic. Has a record of putting 60 toothpicks among his teeth.
Tuncay Beyazıt	Turgut	The locksmith of the neighbourhood.
Erdal Tosun	Recai	Sezai's uncouth older brother who joined the series on 23rd Episode.
Ahmet Arslan	Sinan	Sezai's apprentice. Has a crush on Feyyza who's way older than him.
Tarık Bayrak	Tarık	Turgut's apprentice. Has a crush on Feyyza who's way older than him.
Barış Yıldız	Barış	The leader of the unorganizable mafia of the neighbourhood. Has a crush on Feyyza's friend.
Alper Kadayıfçı	Cem	A member of the unorganizable mafia of the neighbourhood. Has a crush on Feyyza's friend.
Samet Gürsel	Onay	A member of the unorganizable mafia of the neighbourhood. Has a crush on Feyyza's friend.
Ali Akdal	Hüseyin	A member of the unorganizable mafia of the neighbourhood. The only member of the mafia who does not have a crush on Feyyza's friend. But Feyyza's friend starts to have a crush on him at Episode 20.

== Episodes ==
Episode No.	Episode Name	Directed & Written by	Guest Starring	Aired On	Plot
1	"Kardeş Payı"	Selçuk Aydemir	Büşra Pekin	February 13	The 3 siblings want to invent something that will make the world a better place but they have to make money.
2	"Metin ve Ali'ye Piyango Çıktı!"	Selçuk Aydemir		February 20	Somebody wants the invention but they have to deal with Ali's divorce, Metin's crush for Eda and loan to Hilmi for 17000 dollars and him playing tricks to get it back.

== Broadcast ==
Season	Airing Day & Time	Season premiere	Season finale	Number of episodes	Between Episodes	TV season	TV Network
1	Thursdays, 22:45	February 13, 2014	August 7, 2014	3	1-	2014	Star TV
