= A Round of Applause =

2024 Turkish television series

- Turkish: Kuvvetli Bir Alkış
- Genre: Psychological drama
- Created by: Berkun Oya
- Written by: Berkun Oya
- Directed by: Berkun Oya
- Starring: Aslıhan Gürbüz; Fatih Artman; Cihat Süvarioğlu
- Composer: Ebru Suda
- Country of origin: Turkey
- Original language: Turkish
- No. of seasons: 1
- No. of episodes: 6

Production
- Producers: Berkun Oya; Ali Farkhonde; İzlem Genç; Evrim Zeybek
- Cinematography: Yağız Yavru
- Editor: Ali Aga
- Running time: 23–37 minutes
- Production company: Krek Film

Original release
- Network: Netflix
- Release: 29 February 2024 – present

A Round of Applause (Turkish: Kuvvetli Bir Alkış) is a Turkish psychological drama television series created by Berkun Oya, starring Aslıhan Gürbüz, Fatih Artman, and Cihat Süvarioğlu. The series premiered on February 29, 2024, on Netflix.

== Premise ==
The story follows a man struggling with anxiety and trauma in his adult life, caused by emotional wounds from his early years—his infancy, childhood, and teenage years—shaped by his relationship with his parents.

== Cast ==
- Aslıhan Gürbüz as Zeynep
- Fatih Artman as Mehmet
- Cihat Süvarioğlu as Metin
- Cengiz Bozkurt as Kudret / Sertaç
- Nur Sürer
- Settar Tanrıöğen
- Uraz Kaygılaroğlu
- Serra Arıtürk as Ahu
  - Kayra Orta as Ahu (child)
- İpek Türktan as Therapist
- Berkun Oya as Teacher
- Devrim Yakut
- Zeynep Ocak as Sevda
- Menderes Samancılar
