= Ahmet Kural =

Turkish actor (born 1982)

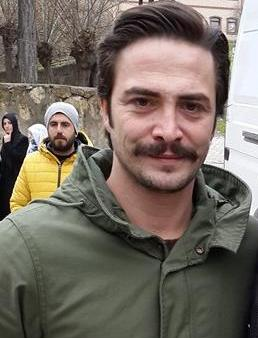
- Born: 10 November 1982 (age 42); Kütahya, Turkey
- Education: Selçuk University; Bilkent University
- Occupation: Actor
- Years active: 2007–present
- Spouse: Çağla Gizem Şahin (m. 2023)
- Children: 2

Ahmet Kural (born 10 November 1982) is a Turkish actor.

== Early life and career ==
Ahmet Kural was born on 10 November 1982 in Kütahya. His father, a chief constable, was working in the city at the time. Due to the influence of his elder sister who was studying acting, Kural decided to become an actor and started working in the theater at high school. He finished radio, television and cinema studies at Selçuk University and took his master's from Bilkent University. He also took acting lessons at the Müjdat Gezen Arts Center.

While continuing his education, he joined the Levent Kırca-Oya Başar Tiyatrosu theater. While his theater studies were continuing, he began to appear on television with his roles in the series Fikrimin İnce Gülü and the TRT series Evimin Erkeği. Later he began to play the leading role in the series Gazi, but due to low ratings, the series was finished after the 19th episode. At the same year, he was cast in the movie Güneşin Oğlu alongside Haluk Bilginer, Köksal Engür, Hümeyra and Özgü Namal. He then appeared in one episode of Ramazan Güzeldir.

In 2010, together with Murat Cemcir, he played a main role in Selçuk Aydemir's movie Çalgı Çengi. On 28 June 2012, his hit comedy series İşler Güçler started airing on Star TV in which he shared the leading roles with Murat Cemcir and Sadi Celil Cengiz. Since the hit comedy series "Kardeş Payı", he and Murat Cemcir continue to play in comedy films and series together.

== Controversies ==
=== Violence against women ===
From time to time, Kural's name has appeared in the media in relation to his acts of violence against women. In September 2014, he broke the finger of his friend, Naz Çekem. In November 2018, singer Sıla accused Kural of physical and psychological violence. In accordance with law, the court issued a restraining order and ordered Kural to stay away from Sıla for three months. Kural denied the allegation that he used violence against Sıla at first, saying that he "only grabbed her arm", but later explained that there was a "scuffle" between them. In the lawsuit filed, it was demanded that he'd be sentenced to 1 year, 4 months and 20 days in prison. Kural's retrial began on 19 February 2021, with the prosecutor seeking up to 5 years in prison for him.

=== Drunk driving incident ===
In February 2020, Kural was involved in a chain reaction car crash with two other cars during which a person got injured. Kural was found to have a blood alcohol level of 1.85 per mille at the time of the crash. He was fined and his driver's license was suspended by the police for six months.

== Filmography ==
Year	TV series title	Role
2024	Gassal	Baki
2021–2022	Bir Zamanlar Kıbrıs	Kemal Dereli
2016	Hayatımın Aşkı	"Supporting actor" (episode 1)
2014–2015	Kardeş Payı	Metin Özdemir
2012–2013	İşler Güçler	Ahmet Kural (himself)
2012	Behzat Ç.	Çalgıcı Gürkan (episode 60)
2011	Üsküdar'a Giderken	Kasap Hasip
2010–2011	Elde Var Hayat	Metin
2009	Ramazan Güzeldir	Mafya (episode 21)
2009	Bir Bulut Olsam	Harun Öğretmen
2009	Kahramanlar	Serkan
2008	Gazi	Fırat Kalender
2007	Evimin Erkeği	Kapıcı Reco
2007	Fikrimin İnce Gülü	Savaş
Year	Movie title	Role
2020	Baba Parası	Selim
2018	Ailecek Şaşkınız	Ferhat
2017	Çalgı Çengi İkimiz	Gürkan
2015	Düğün Dernek 2: Sünnet	Tüpçü Fikret
2014	Oflu Hoca'nın Şifresi	Spor Bakanı Ismail Yaman
2013	Düğün Dernek	Tüpçü Fikret
2010	Memleket Meselesi	Mustafa
2010	Çalgı Çengi	Gürkan
2008	Güneşin Oğlu	Ahmet
