= Seda Bakan =

Turkish actress

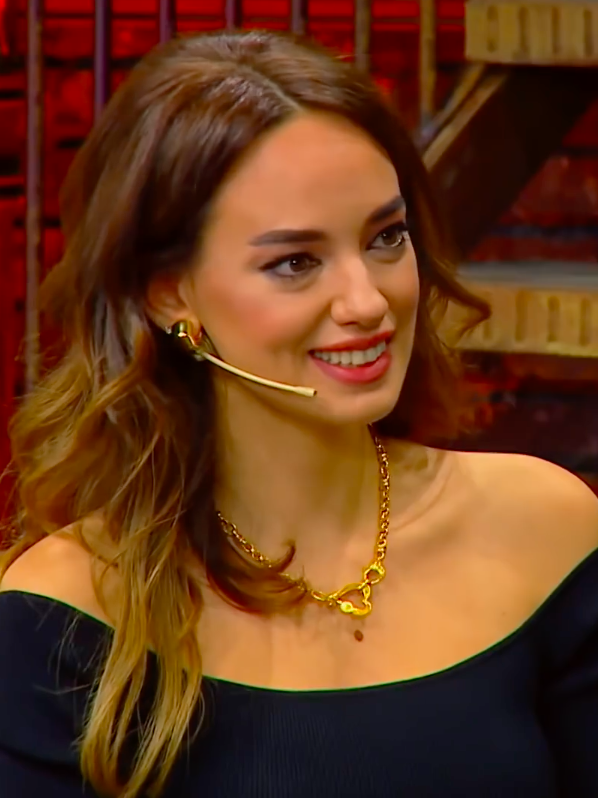
- Seda Bakan in 2018
- Born: 10 October 1985 (age 40); Gebze, Turkey
- Occupation: Actress
- Spouse: Ali Erel (m. 2014)
- Children: 2

Seda Bakan (born 10 October 1985) is a Turkish actress.

She is best known for comedy roles in films, and for portraying Eda in the hit crime series Behzat Ç. and Feyyza in the hit comedy series Kardeş Payı. She played in the movie Arif V 216, which as of April 2021 is the 10th most-watched movie of all time in Turkey according to Box Office.

== Filmography ==
Cinema
Year	Title	Role	Note
2020	Kara Komik Filmler 2: Emanet	Herself	
2019	Öldür Beni Sevgilim		
2018	Arif V 216	Pembe Şeker	
2015	Kara Bela	Burcu	
2014	Zaman Makinesi 1973	Yasemin/Deniz	
2013	Behzat Ç. Ankara Yanıyor	Eda	
2011	Behzat Ç. Seni Kalbime Gömdüm	Eda	
2009	Umut	Meryem	
Web Series
Year	Title	Role	Episode
2022	Zeytin Ağacı	Leyla	1-8
Tv Series
Year	Title	Role	Episode
2020	Mucize Doktor	Ferda	
2015–2016	Bana Sevmeyi Anlat	Leyla	1-22
2014–2015	Kardeş Payı	Feyyza	1-35
2010–2013	Behzat Ç. Bir Ankara Polisiyesi	Eda	1-96
2010	Şen Yuva	Oya	
2010	Geniş Aile	Esma	1 (43rd episode)
2009	Makber	Güneş	1-6
2008–2009	Adanalı	Başak	24-30
2008	Pars: Narkoterör	Zülfiye/Zülüf	1-23
2007	Sana Mecburum	Leyla	1-11
Voice
Year	Title	Role	Episode
2017	Prenses Elena	(voice)	
