= Mine (1983 film) =

1983 film

- Directed by: Atıf Yılmaz
- Written by: Necati Cumali
- Produced by: Atıf Yılmaz
- Starring: Türkan Soray
- Cinematography: Salih Dikisçi
- Release date: January 1983
- Running time: 84 minutes
- Country: Turkey
- Language: Turkish

Mine is a 1983 Turkish drama film directed and produced by Atıf Yılmaz. It was entered into the 14th Moscow International Film Festival, where it was selected for the main competition.

== Cast ==
- Türkan Soray as Mine
- Cihan Ünal as Ilhan
- Hümeyra as Perihan
- Kerim Afsar as Doctor
- Celile Toyon Uysal
