= Ali İhsan Varol =

Turkish TV show presenter and producer

- Adyghe: Уарол Али Iихьсэн
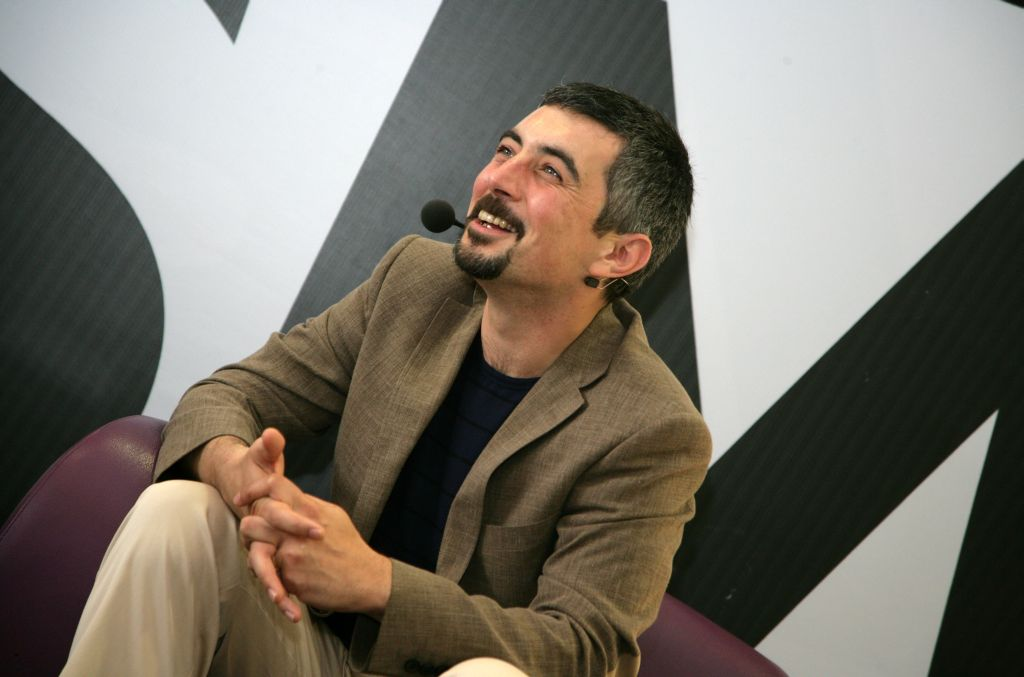
- Varol in 2012
- Born: June 28, 1976 (age 49); Istanbul, Turkey
- Citizenship: Turkey
- Occupations: TV presenter, actor, scenarist, producer
- Years active: 1995–present
- Spouse: Ayşe Varol

Ali İhsan Varol (Adyghe: Уарол Али-Ихьсэн; born 28 June 1976) is a Turkish TV show presenter, producer, and actor of Circassian origin. Known for his cheerful personality, Varol was the presenter and producer of the TV Show Word Game (Kelime Oyunu) from 2009 to 2023. He also starred as Yiğit in TV series, Kardeş Payı.

== Biography ==
He was born in 1976 in Istanbul to Circassian parents who originate from the district of Pınarbaşı, Kayseri. He entered the Ankara University Department of Astronomy and Space Sciences but later changed his mind and entered History, and finally he tried Public Administration. After university, he worked in a car rental business in Bodrum for 1.5 years. He later continued his career in the tourism sector. He then started in the television industry as a production assistant. He took his first step into acting in 1998 with a TV series about a monkey called Çarli, which was broadcast on Star TV. Known as an animal lover, he later took on the role of caring for Çarli, the lead role in the series. The Kelime Oyunu (Word Game) program, which he hosted and produced, gained him fame in Turkey. He also later hosted a version of the show in the Circassian language. In 2014 he joined Kardeş Payı as an actor, where he later worked as a scenarist. In the same year, he was a guest actor the movie Recep İvedik 4 where he played himself.
