= Çalgı Çengi İkimiz =

- Film Poster
- Directed by: Selçuk Aydemir
- Written by: Selçuk Aydemir
- Produced by: Necati Kocabay
- Starring: Ahmet Kural; Murat Cemcir; Rasim Öztekin; Ayhan Taş
- Music by: Aytekin Ataş
- Distributed by: Pinema
- Release date: 6 January 2017
- Country: Turkey
- Language: Turkish
- Budget: 14 million ₺
- Box office: US$2.1 million

Çalgi Çengi Ikimiz is a 2017 Turkish film. It was released in Turkey by Pinema on 6 January 2017. It is the second film of the series Çalgı Çengi.

== Plot ==
Two musicians, Salih and Gürkan, described the adventures of their cousins.

== Cast ==
- Ahmet Kural - Gürkan
- Murat Cemcir - Salih
- Rasim Öztekin - Bünyamin
- Ayhan Taş - İsmet
- Ahmet Gülhan - Kayınbaba
- Ayşe Kökçü - Kaynana
- Nur Erkul - Salih's love interest
- Burak Satıbol - Samet
- Şinasi Yurtsever - Mahmut
- Ceyhun Güneş - Gökmen
- İlker Yakut - Semih
- Tuna Orhan - Mafya Yunus
- Cahit Gök - Mafya Cemal
- Barış Yıldız - Kaşıkçı
- Korhan Herduran - Kaşıkçı
- Samet Gürsel - Kaşıkçı

== Reception ==
The film was number-one on its opening weekend in Turkey, with US$2.06 million.
