= Nilay Deniz =

Turkish actress (born 1993)

- Born: 3 May 1993 (age 32); Aydın, Turkey
- Occupation: Actress
- Years active: 2012–present
- Spouse: Erçin Karabulut (m. 2017; div. 2020)
- Awards: Golden Butterfly Award – Shining Star Award (2015)

Nilay Deniz (born 3 May 1993) is a Turkish actress.

== Life and career ==
Nilay Deniz was born in 1993 in Aydın. After studying acting, she made her television debut in 2010 with a role in the Behzat Ç. series. She continued her career with recurring roles in series such as Ah Neriman, 20 Dakika, and Hayata Beş Kala.

She had a leading role in the period series Mor Menekşeler, which was based on the life of Kabadayı Mehmet, Sarı Veli and Karagöz Kemal. Her breakthrough came with Aşk Yeniden and Güneşi Beklerken. In 2017, she had an official main role in Ateşböceği alongside Seçkin Özdemir, portraying the character of Aslı. She then appeared in a supporting role in the Kalk Gidelim series as Nehir. In 2020, she was cast in Kanal D's romantic comedy series Çatı Katı Aşk, playing the role of Yasemin.

== Filmography ==
Television
Year	Title	Role	Notes
2010	Behzat Ç. Bir Ankara Polisiyesi	Rüya	Supporting role
2011	Mor Menekşeler	Cevriye	Leading role
2011	Hayata Beş Kala	Selma	Supporting role
2013	Güneşi Beklerken	Begüm Varol	Supporting role
2014	Ah Neriman	Zeynep	Supporting role
2015–2016	Aşk Yeniden	Selin Şekerçizade Günay	Supporting role
2017	Dayan Yüreğim	Seray	Leading role
2017	Ateşböceği	Aslı	Leading role
2019	Kalk Gidelim	Nehir	Supporting role
2020	Çatı Katı Aşk	Yasemin Çetin	Leading role
2021	Kahraman Babam	Yonca	Leading role
