= Gürdal Tosun =

Turkish actor (1967–2000)

- Born: 14 March 1967; Istanbul, Turkey
- Died: 30 August 2000 (aged 33); Istanbul, Turkey
- Occupations: Actor; voice actor; ticket salesman
- Years active: 1987–2000
- Father: Necdet Tosun
- Relatives: Erdal Tosun (brother)

Gürdal Tosun (14 March 1967 – 30 August 2000) was a Turkish actor.

== Biography ==
Born in Istanbul to actor Necdet Tosun and the younger brother of actor Erdal Tosun, he followed in the footsteps of his father. Despite taking exams for three consecutive years, Tosun was not admitted into drama school because of his weight but he did not allow this to stop him pursuing his career. He then found a job selling tickets at a theatre where Levent Kırca often performed and eventually, he enrolled in the Mimar Sinan Fine Arts University.

Tosun appeared in over several films and television shows and often performed at Turkish State Theatres. Tosun was renowned for his role as Tombalak in the comedy series Bir Demet Tiyatro and as a voice actor, he provided the Turkish voice of Rex in the first two Toy Story films as well as dubbing the voices of villainous henchmen in Disney Renaissance films. These include Pain in the 1997 animated film Hercules and Banzai in the 1994 animated film The Lion King.

== Death ==
On 30 August 2000 Tosun died at the age of 33, as a result of kidney failure due to intestinal ischemia. He was awaiting a transplant at the time of his death. He was interred at Zincirlikuyu Cemetery beside his father and later, his brother.

== Filmography ==
=== Cinema ===
- Gün Doğmadan (1987)
- Otogargara (1997)
- Sen Hiç Ateşböceği Gördün mü? (1999)

=== Television ===
- Bir Demet Tiyatro (1995–2000)
- Güneş Yanıkları (2000)
