= Kod Adı: K.O.Z. =

- Directed by: Celal Çimen
- Screenplay by: Parantez Yazı Grubu
- Produced by: Uğur Yalçınkaya; Kazım Albayrak
- Starring: Cem Kurtoğlu; Tolga Karel; Hakan Ural; Hazım Körmükçü
- Cinematography: İlkay Işık
- Music by: Özkan Turgay
- Production company: Fono Film
- Release date: February 13, 2015
- Running time: 115 minutes
- Country: Turkey
- Language: Turkish

Kod Adı: K.O.Z. (English: Code Name: K.O.Z) is a 2015 Turkish political propaganda film, directed by Celal Çimen, starring Cem Kurtoğlu, Tolga Karel, Hakan Ural and Hazım Körmükçü. It tells the story of the 2013 corruption scandal in Turkey and other recent political events, from the viewpoint that they are conspiracies against the Erdoğan government by the "Parallel state". It features a fictionalized Prime Minister of Turkey modeled after Recep Tayyip Erdoğan as the protagonist and the Gülen movement and Fethullah Gülen as the antagonist.

== Reception ==
With "confused and primitive" editing, acting described as robotic, and an "unfathomable" screenplay, one reviewer described it as being not even worthy of belonging to the genre of film propaganda like Triumph of the Will.

Shortly after its February 2015 release, the movie ranked at the bottom of IMDb's Bottom 100 list, with an average score of 1.0 (lowest possible) from more than 5,000 users. Its rating subsequently slightly increased, though it remains at number four of the same list as of 2021. For its cinematic release in Turkey, despite being of minority interest, the film was distributed to 850 cinemas, resulting in several mainstream movies missing their release dates. Today's Zaman speculated that this was because cinema owners considered that the Turkish authorities expected its screening to be mandatory. Because of the lack of interest from movie-goers, several cinemas ended up showing it for free.

== See also ==
- Reis (film)
