= Reis (film) =

- Theatrical release poster with original release date
- Directed by: Hüdaverdi Yavuz
- Produced by: Kafkasör Film Akademisi
- Starring: Reha Beyoglu; Özlem Balci; Volkan Basaran
- Release date: March 3, 2017
- Running time: 108 minutes
- Country: Turkey
- Language: Turkish
- Budget: $8.000.000
- Box office: $538,551

Reis (Turkish: The Chief) is a 2017 Turkish biographical film about Recep Tayyip Erdoğan, the incumbent President of Turkey. It was released shortly before the constitutional referendum which aimed for a transition to an executive presidency.

== Synopsis ==
Reis describes Recep Tayyip Erdoğan's childhood and his 1994 to 1998 Istanbul mayoral tenure. The movie ends when he entered prison in 1998 as a consequence of reading a religiously intolerant poem in Siirt ("minarets are bayonets, domes are helmets, mosques are our barracks, believers are soldiers").

== Cast ==
- Reha Beyoğlu as President Recep Tayyip Erdoğan
- Özlem Balcı as Emine Erdoğan
- Orhan Aydin as Komiser Serhat
- Ayhan Eroğlu as Hasan Yesildag
- Abidin Yerebakan as Mustafa
- İsmail Hakkı Ürün as Ismail
- Volkan Basaran as Sultan Baskan

== Controversy and reception ==
Hüdaverdi Yavuz, the director of the movie, refused to attend the movie's premiere, citing various troubles during the shooting, unpaid staff, and his forcefully reduced involvement in the post-production process as reasons. IMDb attributed the film a rating of 1.8 based on over 71,000 ratings. Reis attracted shy of 67,580 viewers in the first three days (March 3–5).

== See also ==
- Kod Adı: K.O.Z.
- Turkish constitutional referendum, 2017
