= Murat Cemcir =

Turkish actor of Georgian descent

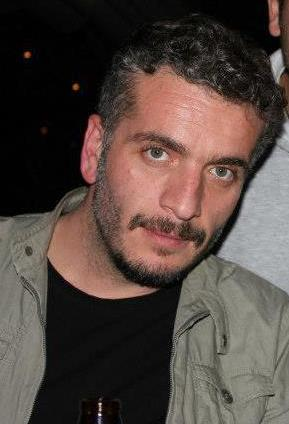
- Cemcir in October 2012
- Born: November 30, 1976 (age 49); Niksar, Tokat, Turkey
- Education: Mustafa Kemal University
- Occupation: Actor
- Years active: 2002–present

Murat Cemcir (born November 30, 1976) is a Turkish actor of Georgian descent who appears regularly in Turkish films and on television, primarily in comedies.

== Career ==
He played in hit short comedy series "Ramazan Güzeldir" and "Üsküdar'a Giderken". He later starred with Ahmet Kural in the hit series İşler Güçler, a behind-the-scenes comedy about television production. In 2014, he began performing in the hit television comedy Kardeş Payı.

He and Ahmet Kural continues to play together in franchise comedy films. He also is producer. Cemcir appeared in the films Çalgı Çengi with Ahmet Kural in 2011. In 2013, he starred in the films Düğün Dernek, which became the most-watched Turkish film in 30 years. He played in art movie Zeki Demirkubuz's "Yeraltı" and Nuri Bilge Ceylan's "Ahlat Ağacı" which premiered at Cannes Film Festival.

== Filmography ==
=== TV series ===
Year	Title	Role
2016	Hayatımın Aşkı	"Supporting role" (1st episode)
2014	Kardeş Payı	Ali Özdemir
2012	İşler Güçler	Murat Cemcir
2012	Behzat Ç.	Salih (Çalgı Çengi) (60th episode)
2011	Üsküdar'a Giderken	Oğuz Cemcir
2010	Küstüm Çiçeği	Hidayet
2009	Bir Bulut Olsam	Asil
2009	Ramazan Güzeldir	Dilenci Tankut
2008	Gazi	Guest

=== Film ===
Year	Title	Role			
2020	Baba Parası				
2018	Ahlat Ağacı	Idris Öğretmen	2018	Ailecek Şaşkınız	Gökhan
2017	Çalgı Çengi İkimiz	Salih			
2015	Düğün Dernek 2: Sünnet	Çetin			
2013	Düğün Dernek	Çetin			
2012	Yeraltı	Sinan			
2010	Çalgı Çengi	Salih			
2008	Kurbanlık	Fakir Adam			
2008	Söndürülen Hayatlar (5.Boyut)	Doktor Kenan (TV film)			
2006	Polis	Komiser Hüseyin			
2006	Pars: Kiraz Operasyonu	Kargo müdürü			
2005	Takva	Mahmut			
2002	Sırlar Dünyası / Sır Kapısı	Fatih Hoca (TV film)			
