= Bir Bulut Olsam =

- Written by: Meral Okay
- Directed by: Ulaş İnaç
- Starring: Engin Altan Düzyatan; Melisa Sözen; Engin Akyürek; Aslıhan Gürbüz; Berfu Öngören
- Composer: Aytekin Ataş
- Country of origin: Turkey
- Original language: Turkish
- No. of seasons: 2
- No. of episodes: 29

Production
- Producer: Timur Savcı
- Running time: 90 min
- Production company: Tims Productions

Original release
- Network: Kanal D
- Release: February 23 – December 24, 2009

Bir Bulut Olsam (English: If I were a cloud) is a Turkish television series produced by Tims Productions and broadcast on Kanal D. It was aired from February 23, 2009, to 24 December 2009 . It was directed by Ulaş İnaç and written by Meral Okay. The music was composed by Aytekin Ataş.

== Plot ==
Narin Bulut who is yet to turn eighteen, has been married to Mustafa Bulut for more than a year. Mustafa is Narin's first cousin also which makes Narin to not accept him as a husband. Their marriage is yet to be consummated. Mustafa is epileptic and is obsessed with Narin. Mustafa's parents force him to marry again with Asiye. During his wedding, Mustafa shoots Narin. Narin is saved by Dr. Serdar Batur. Serdar gets to know about Narin's plight and Mustafa's obsession for Narin. The story revolves around Mustafa's failed attempts to claim Narin's love.

== Cast ==
- Engin Akyürek as Mustafa Bulut
- Melisa Sözen as Narin Bulut
- Engin Altan Düzyatan as Dr. Serdar Batur
- Aslıhan Gürbüz as Asiye Bulut
- Ünal Silver as Aslan Bulut
- Sema Keçik Karabel as Düriye Bulut
- Cahit Gök as Yaşar Bulut
- Burcu Binici as Gülengül Bulut
- Haluk Cömert as Kadir Bulut
- Ebru Nil Aydın as Hatun Bulut
- Şukran Ovali as Bahar Açar
- Ahmet Kural as Harun
- Meral Okay as İnci Batur
- Selim Bayraktar as Mahmut Paşa
- Şinasi Yurtsever as Ali Asker
- Hülya Duyar as Fatma
- Berfu Öngören as Seher
- Suat Usta as İbo
- Murat Cemcir as Asil
- Cüneyt Yilmaz as Muko
- İlkaye Doğan as Safiye
- Hatice Sezer as Naciye
- Lebib Gökhan as Murat
- Duygu Zade as Zeynep
- Kübra Tekin as Melek
- İzzettin Atuğ as Ramo
- Mertcan Yilmaz as Samet
- Muhammed Aslan as Yusuf

== International broadcast ==
Country	Channel	premiere	display name
Turkey	Kanal D	February 23, 2009	If I were a cloud
Northern Cyprus	Kanal D	February 23, 2009	If I were a cloud
United Arab Emirates	OSN MBC	2011 2013	
Saudi Arabia	OSN MBC	2011 2013	
Egypt	OSN MBC	2011 2013	
Bahrain	OSN MBC	2011 2013	
(Arab League) Arab World	OSN MBC	2011 2013	
Croatia	Nova TV	2013	da sam oblak
Kazakhstan	NTK	2013 September–October	If I find a bullion
Pakistan	Urdu1	2014	Nijat
