= Necdet Tosun =

Turkish actor and producer (1926–1975)

- Born: 3 August 1926; Burhaniye, Turkey
- Died: 10 May 1975 (aged 49); Istanbul, Turkey
- Occupations: Actor; film producer
- Years active: 1940–1975
- Spouse: Sevim Tosun (m. 1960)
- Children: Erdal; Gürdal

Necdet Tosun (3 August 1926 – 10 May 1975) was a Turkish actor and film producer.

== Biography ==
Born in Burhaniye, Tosun started out in life working in the hospitality industry. His appearance attracted a film crew that arrived in Burhaniye. Since then, Tosun made his mark in the black and white period in Turkish cinema and starred in over 400 films during his lifetime.

At the time of his career, Tosun won the respect and the sympathy of his audience for his optimistic, portly appearance. His sons would later follow in his footsteps.

=== Personal life ===
In 1960, Tosun married Sevim Tosun. From this marriage, he was the father of the actors Erdal and Gürdal Tosun.

== Death ==
In 1975, Tosun was involved in a car crash in Germany while on business. He was later brought back to Istanbul for treatment but he succumbed to his injuries on 10 May and was buried at Zincirlikuyu Cemetery. His sons would later be buried alongside him.

== Filmography ==
=== Cinema ===
- Watchmen of Dawn (1963)
