= Tuvana Türkay =

Turkish actress

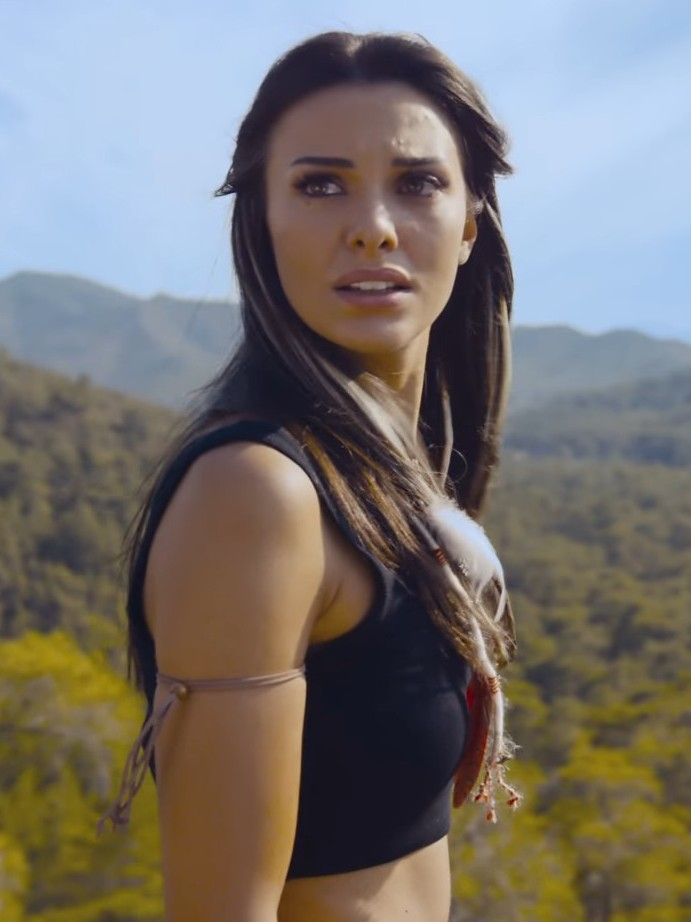
- Türkay in 2016
- Born: 3 October 1990 (age 36); Üsküdar, Istanbul, Turkey
- Education: Beykent University – Radio, Television and Cinema
- Occupation: Actress

Tuvana Türkay (born 3 October 1990) is a Turkish actress.

== Early life ==
Türkay was born on 3 October 1990 in Üsküdar, Istanbul, Turkey. She studied at Beykent University in the Department of Radio, Television and Cinema.

Her older sister, Katre Türkay, is also a model and an actress.

== Filmography ==
=== Film ===
Film
Year	Production	Role	Notes
2013	Eksik Sayfalar	Ayşegül	Main role
2015	En Güzeli	Gizem	Main role
2015	Güvercin Uçuverdi	Sema Taşkın	Main role
2015	Bizans Oyunları (Game of Byzantine)	Ayçörek Hatun	Main role
2016	Somuncu Baba Aşkın Sırrı	Necmiye	Main role
2016	Sen Sağ Ben Selamet	Doğa	Main role
2017	Olanlar Oldu	Aslı	Main role
2017	Bir Nefes Yeter	Nefes Aksoy	Main role
2020	Ağır Romantik	Aslı Egeli	Main role
2023	Murat Göğebakan: Kalbim Yaralı	Sema Bekmez	Main role

=== TV series ===
Television
Year	Production	Role	Notes
2009	Ayrılık	Kevok	Main role
2010	Nakş-ı Dil Sultan	Nakşidil Sultan	Main role
2010–2012	Yer Gök Aşk	Bade Palalı Hancıoğlu	Main role
2014	Kara Para Aşk	Bahar Çınar	Main role
2016	Oyunbozan	Ece	Main role
2017	Deli Gönül	Fatmanur	Main role
2017–2018	Kızlarım İçin	Kumru	Main role
2019–2020	Yasak Elma	Leyla	Supporting role
2021	Kağıt Ev	Azra	Main role
2021–2022	Çember	Commissioner Zeynep Üstünipek	Main role
2023-2024	Kudüs Fatihi Selahaddin Eyyubi	Queen Victoria	Main role
2024–2025	Teşkilat	Kate	Supporting role

== Discography ==
Singles

- "Yalan De" (2019)
- "Ah Aşk" (2021)
- "Geceler" (2022)

== Books ==
- İkimiz de Beni Seviyoruz, Artemis Publishing (2020)
