= Monika Bulanda =

- Born: Monika Ana Bulanda; 13 April 1983 (age 43); Kraków, Poland
- Genres: Pop; electronic; dance-pop; synthpop; world
- Occupations: Painter, visual artist, musician, drummer, singer
- Instruments: drums, percussion, vocal, piano
- Years active: 1998–present
- Website: monikabulanda-art.com monikabulanda.com

Monika Bulanda (born on 13 April 1983) is a musician and visual artist. She currently works and lives in Istanbul, Turkey. She released her first solo album Forever I'll Be Young under the Turkish music label 3 Adım Müzik.

== Life and career ==
=== 1983–1997: Early life ===
Bulanda was born in Kraków. She was the youngest member of a local art gallery where she took painting classes at the Maria Kaminska and Ignacy Kurowski atelier. She started piano lessons at the age of 6, and later began learning to play the drums. At the age of 13, she began performing at local weddings and events with bands. She also participated in regional young instrumentalist competitions.

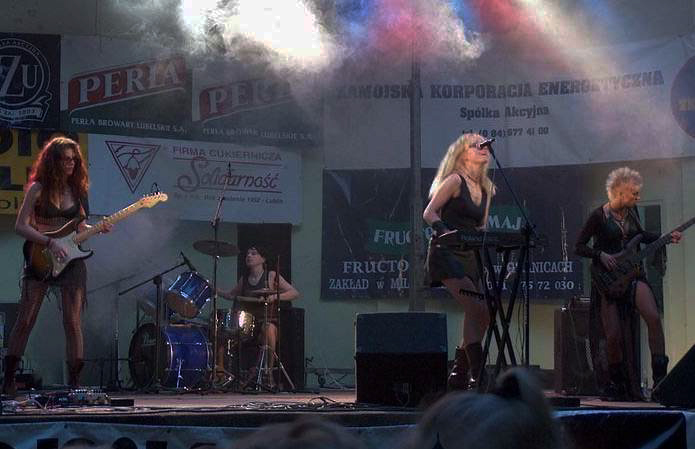
Monika performing with ''Matka'' in 2002.

=== 1997–2004: High school and career ===
Preparing to enter art school, she attended VI Liceum Ogólnokształcące im. A.Mickiewicza in Kraków, specializing in linguistics. She graduated with a bilingual (Spanish and Polish) education. As the age of 16, she started to play in music clubs in Kraków, being named as the first female drummer in Poland. She appeared in the "Droga do Gwiazd" young talent contest where Sony Music proposed her to join the female pop-rock band Matka, which she accepted. Playing with Matka she appeared on programs such as "Kuba Wojewódzki" and talk-show, "Bar". When she was 19, the band Matka started to work with polish pop singer Michal Wisniewski. She continued her studying at the Kraków School of Jazz and Contemporary Music, the Katowice Academy of Jazz Music, the Chopin School of Music "Bednarska". and the University of Warsaw studying Chinese Language and Culture. Bulanda holds B.A. in Music and B.A. in Sinology.

=== 2007–2008: China ===
After graduating, she moved to Beijing, China and joined the Beijing Film Academy. Soon after, she started playing with different Chinese musicians and bands in clubs and music festivals around China. She was also invited to conduct drums workshops for Sonor Drums in Kuala Lumpur, Malaysia what resulted with releasing the workshop DVD.

=== 2008–present: Turkey ===
Invited by American bass player Tony Jones to join his project in Turkey, she came to Bodrum but then moved to Istanbul and continues to live there. She collaborates with Turkish pop singer Kenan Doğulu as well as Mabel Matiz playing percussion. She is also a drummer on a TV Show in Turkey- Elin Oğlu. She played drums for Turkish guitarist Bilal Karaman on his album Bahane and Turkish pianist Selen Gülün with her project Kadın Matınesı. In April 2015 she released her solo pop album Forever I'll Be Young which she produced under Turkish music label 3 Adım Müzik.

== Painting ==
As a child, Bulanda began taking intensive painting classes at the local art gallery in Stary Sącz.

She planned to enter art school, but due to her allergy of paint she decided to choose linguistic school instead. After visiting New York in 2010, inspired by its architecture and its multicultural aspect, she developed her unique mixed technique. Her works were presented at the Contemporary Istanbul Art Fair. Soon after, she opened couple of group and solo exhibitions. She collaborated with Dutch artist Mathilde ter Heijne on her project and also Levent Kunt on his project at the Depo Culture Centre.

The emotional relationship she that established with the cities where she lived was an important matter, which formed the basis of her art.

Selected Solo Exhibitions
"Multi-City in 2013 (Alan Gallery)
"Watching The Unknown" in 2015. (Kare Art Gallery)

== Discography ==
Discography
Forever I'll Be Young (2015) 3 Adım Müzik
Multi City CD for her Art Exhibition (2013)
Song for Art Project of Mathilde ter Heijne

All music is composed by Monika Bulanda.

Forever I'll Be Young
No.	Title	Length
1.	"Wanna Feel You"	3.57
2.	"Never Ever"	4.16
3.	"Forever I'll Be Young"	3.15
4.	"Trusted You My Heart"	3.48
5.	"Leave Me"	3.49
6.	"One More Time"	3.07
7.	"Clunk"	3.02
8.	"Dame Mas"	3.25
