= İşler Güçler =

- Genre: Comedy
- Written by: Selçuk Aydemir
- Directed by: Selçuk Aydemir
- Starring: Ahmet Kural; Murat Cemcir; Sadi Celil Cengiz
- Music by: "Peh Peh Peh"
- Country of origin: Turkey
- Original language: Turkish
- No. of episodes: 41

Production
- Production location: Istanbul
- Production company: Limon Yapım

Original release
- Network: Star TV
- Release: 28 June 2012 – 4 June 2013

İşler Güçler is a Turkish comedy drama series which aired first on 28 June 2012 on Star TV and tells the story of three actors, with the motto Modern Muzip Yalanlar (modern wicked lies). The main actors are Ahmet Kural, Murat Cemcir and Sadi Celil Cengiz who are using their real names in the TV series.

== Topic ==
Ahmet Kural, Murat Cemcir and Sadi Celil Cengiz are dreaming to shoot a movie together. They can't however provide the money needed for it and start working on smaller projects like 'Meslek Hikayeleri' (profession stories) in order to afford it.

Ahmet, misses the days he played a leading role in a TV series. He thinks that he is not a well-known actor currently and is always complaining about this situation.

Murat is trying to do his best and also finds it difficult to work with his ex-girlfriend who left him several years ago.

Sadi, had given up working as a customs official before joining the cast of 'Meslek Hikayeleri'. He has to deal with some financial and family problems. Getting his wage is really important for him because he does not have a money source except the series in which he acts as a figurant. However, the crew and the producer of the documentary makes it more difficult.

== Characters ==
Actor	Character
Ahmet Kural	himself
Murat Cemcir	himself
Sadi Celil Cengiz	himself
Hürriyet Özkılıç	Melek, Ahmet's agent
Yeliz Şar	Tülay, Murat's agent
Ceren Moray	Zehra, Sadi's sister
Nazlı Tosunoğlu	Sadi's aunt
Şinasi Yurtsever	Hakkı the Producer
Burak Satıbol	Salih
Gaye Gürsel	Feride
Açalya Samyeli Danoğlu	Zeynep
Korhan Herduran	Vedat
Yılmaz Gruda	Rüstem
Berna Koraltürk	Pınar
Salih Bilen	Mesut the Receptionist
Murat Akkoyunlu	Şenol the Producer
Ayhan Taş	Münir the Training Coach
Ahmet Dursun	Onur the Boom operator
