= Telling Tales (film) =

- Film poster
- Directed by: Burak Aksak
- Starring: Hande Doğandemir; Fatih Artman
- Distributed by: United International Pictures
- Release date: 9 January 2015
- Running time: 103 minutes
- Country: Turkey
- Language: Turkish

Telling Tales (Turkish: Bana Masal Anlatma) is a 2015 Turkish comedy film directed by Burak Aksak.

== Cast ==
- Hande Doğandemir - Ayperi
- Fatih Artman - Riza
- Devrim Yakut - Selma
- Erdal Tosun - Cemal
- Tarık Ünlüoğlu - Timur
- Gürkan Uygun - Jilet Ali
- Cengiz Bozkurt - Nafi
- Burcu Biricik - Ezgi
- Çağlar Ertuğrul - Erdil
- Andy Boyns - Contractor
