= Olanlar Oldu =

- Film poster
- Directed by: Hakan Algül
- Written by: Ata Demirer
- Produced by: Necati Akpınar; Funda Ödemiş
- Starring: Ata Demirer; Tuvana Türkay; Ülkü Duru; Salih Kalyon
- Cinematography: Ahmet Sesigürgil
- Music by: Fahir Atakoğlu
- Distributed by: BKM
- Release date: 20 January 2017
- Running time: 60:40:08
- Country: Turkey
- Language: Turkish
- Box office: 13,682,930 ₺

Olanlar Oldu is a 2017 Turkish film. It was released in Turkey by BKM Film on 10 January 2017.

== Plot ==
Zafer, a sailor living with his mother Döndü in a coastal village in İzmir, has just separated from his girlfriend Mehtap whose father is also a sailor. While Döndü and her friend, Fahriye try to help Zafer to marry someone and have his own family, a famous and talented actress, Aslı surprisingly attends Zafer's boat tour. Then Asli and Zafer find themselves getting to know each other.

== Cast ==
- Ata Demirer - Zafer/Döndü
- Tuvana Türkay- Asli
- Salih Kalyon
- Ülkü Duru
- Derya Alabora - Auntula
- Seda Güven - Mehtap
- Recep Renan Bilek
- Toprak Sergen
- Ali Yoğurtçuoğlu
- Bige Önal as Gizem
