= Devrim Yakut =

Turkish actor (born 1968)

- Born: Seher Devrim Yakut; 27 May 1968 (age 57); Ankara, Turkey
- Occupation: Actress
- Years active: 1992–present

Seher Devrim Yakut (born 27 May 1968) is a Turkish actress.

== Life and career ==
Yakut graduated from Ankara University DTCF Theatre Department in 1992. She first studied theatre theories and then acting in the DTCF Theatre Department. She joined the Adana State Theatre as an actress in 1994 and worked there until 2003. Subsequently, she founded the Adana Theatre Workshop. In addition to acting, she also worked as a producer and instructor in this institution. She was appointed to Ankara State Theatre in 2003. In 2005, she started teaching basic acting at Ankara University DTCF Theatre Department. She worked as the deputy director of the Ankara State Theatre in 2007, and the director of the Ankara State Theatre in 2007–2008. Between 2006 and 2007, she joined the Aysa Production Theatre as a guest actress with the play Kocasını Pişiren Kadın. She subsequently taught acting in the master's program at Bahçeşehir University and later at Das Das Academy. Since late 2000s, she has appeared in various films and TV productions.

In addition to acting, In 2021, her first book Aklımın Aynalı Çarşısı was published.

== Theatre ==
- Manik Atak : Bihter Dinçel – BKM – 2019
- Ex-Press : Mustafa Avkıran – Ankara State Theatre – 2009
- Tek Kişilik Şehir : Behiç Ak – Ankara State Theatre – 2008
- Kocasını Pişiren Kadın : Behiç Ak – Aysa Production Theatre – 2006
- Iron : Rona Munro – Ankara State Theatre – 2003
- Olağanüstü Bir Gece : Jerome Chodorov – Adana State Theatre – 2002
- Bağdat Hatun : Güngör Dilmen – Adana State Theatre – 2001
- The Taming of the Shrew : William Shakespeare – Adana State Theatre – 2000
- Pazartesi Perşembe : Musahipzade Celal – Adana State Theatre – 1999
- Frank V : Friedrich Dürrenmatt – Adana State Theatre – 1998
- Silvan'lı Kadınlar : İsmail Kaygusuz – Adana State Theatre – 1997
- Ayı ve Daha Birsürü : Anton Çehov – Adana State Theatre – 1997
- Üçkâğıtçı : Orhan Kemal – Adana State Theatre – 1997
- Midasın'ın Kulakları : Güngör Dilmen – Adana State Theatre – 1996
- Romeo and Juliet : William Shakespeare – Adana State Theatre – 1995
- Bozuk Düzen : Güner Sümer : Adana State Theatre – 1995
- Ağrı Dağı Efsanesi : Yaşar Kemal – Adana State Theatre – 1994
- Bir Şehnaz Oyun : Turgut Özakman – Ankara State Theatre – 1992
- Taziye : Murathan Mungan
- Binali ile Temir : Murathan Mungan
- Yaşasın Ölüm

== Filmography ==
Film
Year	Title	Role	
2011	Luks Otel	Frida	
2013	Kelebeğin Rüyası	Fikriye Onur	
2013	Dügün Dernek	Hatice	
2014	Sadece Sen	Hülya	
2014	Yağmur: Kıyamet Çiçeği	Saviye Koyuncu	
2015	Bana Masal Anlatma	Selma	
2015	Çalsın Sazlar	Suna	
2015	8 Saniye	Teyze	
2015	Dügün Dernek 2: Sünnet	Hatice	
2016	Ekşi Elmalar	Ayda	
2016	Dar Elbise	Gülen's mother	
2017	Salur Kazan:Zoraki Kahraman	Burla Hatun	
2017	Aile Arasında	Mükerrem Kurt	
2018	Hareket Sekiz	Neriman	
2020	Baba Parası	Yakut	
2023	Gün Batımına Birkaç Gün Kala		
Television
Year	Title	Role	Network
1990	Ortabeket	Saliha	
1991	Alim Dayı	Selim's wife	
2011-2012	Keşanlı Ali Destanı	Rukiye	Kanal D
2012	Annem Uyurken	Nuran	Kanal D
2013	Vicdan	Esma	Kanal D
2013–2014	Ben Onu Çok Sevdim	Naciye Aydan	atv
2014	Analı Oğullu	Sidar	Show TV
2016–2017	Cesur ve Güzel	Mihriban Aydınbaş	Star TV
2017	Hayat Sırları	İnci Kuzgun	Star TV
2018	Darısı Başımıza	Zerrin	Show TV
2019–2020	Payitaht Abdülhamid	Cemile Sultan	TRT1
2021–2023	Camdaki Kız	Gülcihan Koroğlu	Kanal D
2023–	Kirli Sepeti	Canan	FOX
Streaming films and series
Year	Title	Role	Platform
2021	Sen Hiç Ateşböceği Gördün mü?	İclal	Netflix
2021	Şeref Bey	Solmaz	Exxen
2023	Rüyanda Görürsün	Pelin's mother	Amazon Prime
2023	Yaratılan	Ofelya	Netflix
2024	A Round of Applause		Netflix

== Awards and nominations ==
Year	Award (Category)	Work	Result
2007	Sadri Alışık Theatre Awards (Best Actress in a Musical or Comedy)	Kocasını Pişiren Kadın	Won
2007	Ankara Art Institution (Commendable Actress Award)	Frank V	Won
2007	VIII. Lions Awards (Best Actress)	Tek Kişilik Şehir	Won
2007	Afife Theatre Awards (Best Actress)	Kocasını Pişiren Kadın	Nominated
2007	Theatre Magazine Awards (Best Actress)	Kocasını Pişiren Kadın	Nominated
2008	Ankara Art Institution (Actress of the Year)	Tek Kişilik Şehir	Won
2019	Sadri Alışık Theatre Awards (Best Actress in a Comedy)	Manik Atak	Won
