= Trouble on Wheels =

- Film poster
- Directed by: Burak Aksak
- Starring: Cengiz Bozkurt; Seda Bakan
- Release date: 18 September 2015
- Running time: 105 minutes
- Country: Turkey
- Language: Turkish

Trouble on Wheels (Turkish: Kara Bela) is a 2015 Turkish action film directed by Burak Aksak.

== Cast ==
- Cengiz Bozkurt - Kudret
- Seda Bakan - Burcu
- Erkan Kolçak Köstendil - Güven
- Cihan Ercan - Efkan
- Berat Yenilmez - Zabita Amiri
- Tarık Ünlüoğlu - Atilgan
