= Zeynep Günay Tan =

Turkish director (born 1975)

- Born: Zeynep Günay; 7 September 1975 (age 50); Gönen, Balıkesir
- Occupation: Director
- Years active: 2005–present
- Spouse: Onur Tan (divorced)
- Children: 2

Zeynep Günay Tan (born 7 September 1975) is a Turkish director. She noticed her interest in cinema and television during her high school years. She began her theatre training in Italy but returned to Turkey without completing her education. She eventually majored in the Italian Language and Literature. She started working in television sets since her early years at the university. She worked as an assistant for Kartal Tibet, and later became an assistant director to Ziya Öztan, Ömer Kavur and Çağan Irmak. In 2005, she directed her first TV series Güz Yangını, followed by Eşref Saati in 2007. In 2009, due to her contract with a production company, she directed ten episodes of Kurtlar Vadisi Pusu. In 2010, she began directing her first long-term drama series Öyle Bir Geçer Zaman ki. The series, which lasted for three seasons, won the Best TV Series award at the 38th Golden Butterfly Awards in 2011. It also won the Best Drama Series Award at the 2nd Antalya Television Awards in the same year. After Öyle Bir Geçer Zaman ki she worked as a director in short-term productions, including Kayıp in 2013 and Benim Adım Gültepe in 2014. In 2015, she directed the first episode of Muhteşem Yüzyıl: Kösem. In 2016, she served as a creative director in the series Arkadaşlar İyidir. Her latest work is İstanbullu Gelin, which premiered in 2017. With three seasons in total, it was a nominee for the Telenovela award at the 46th International Emmy Awards.

== Life and career ==
=== Early life and career beginnings ===
Zeynep Günay Tan was born in 1975 in Gönen, Balıkesir. Her parents are lawyers, and she has a younger sister. After studying in Gönen until the 5th grade of elementary school, she enrolled in the İzmir American High School and studied boarding and relocated to İzmir. When she was in the last year of high school, she went to the United World Colleges in Italy with a scholarship she earned from the Ministry of National Education and studied there for two years. There she acted in and directed short films which they prepared in the social clubs of the school, and they also worked on the editing and soundtracks of these films. Günay, who wanted to be an actress since her childhood, realized that she also enjoyed working behind the cameras while she was studying abroad. After high school, she began her theatre training in Italy, but she lost her scholarship following an economic crisis in her homeland and was forced to return to Turkey. When she returned to Turkey, she applied to Mimar Sinan University, but was eliminated during the interview. She couldn't prepare for the university exam as she had studied abroad, and was eventually placed in the language department. Günay is a graduate of Italian Language and Literature from Istanbul University. During her time as a freshman, she started working on the set of different TV series.

While Günay was continuing her education at the university, she started working at Vipsaş, a film company owned by her father's friend. There she worked as an assistant in the production department and was responsible for preparing the scenario of episodes for the table-reading among the actors. After doing this work for a year and a half, she became an assistant to Kartal Tibet. In 2003, she worked as the assistant director in the film Abdülhamid Düşerken, directed by Ziya Öztan. In the same year, she worked as an assistant director in the movie The Encounter, directed by Ömer Kavur, and served as the general coordinator in the series Serseri Aşıklar. In 2004, she was the assistant director on Ismaël Ferroukhi's 2004 film Le Grand Voyage, which was a co-production between France, Morocco, Bulgaria and Turkey. In the same year, she worked as an assistant director in Kanal D's series Çemberimde Gül Oya, directed by Çağan Irmak. Irmak asked Günay to direct an important scene in the 8th episode of the series. Then producer Şükrü Avşar made a proposal to Günay to direct the series Güz Yangını.

=== 2005–2009 ===
The first series directed by Günay is Güz Yangını, starring Fikret Kuşkan anad Cansu Dere. The series, which premiered on Show TV in 2006, focuses on the challenges faced by Dila Hanım, a widow with four children. After the series ended prematurely, Günay started directing Star TV's series Kaybolan Yıllar, starring Burak Hakkı, Yeşim Büber and Saruhan Hünel. It premiered on 1 July 2006. Produced by Base Production, the series is about Esmer and Ali, who spent their childhood in an orphanage and come together after 20 years. From episode 28, the series was directed by Gülçin Gülbahçe and concluded with 49 episodes.

In 2007, Günay started directing Eşref Saati, which was produced by Pana Film and premiered on Show TV. The comedy series, starring Yetkin Dikinciler and Yavuz Bingöl, is about the story of two bullies named Sarı Eşref and Kara Eşref living in the same neighborhood. Eşref Saati premiered on 18 October 2007. At the end of 2008, due to financial issues between the channel and the production company, the series was forced to conclude with 38 episodes. In 2009, Günay started directing another series produced by Pana Film called Kurtlar Vadisi Pusu. She got the position after Sadullah Şentürk left the crew to focus on his cinematic project. Günay directed the series from episode 52 to 62. Columnist Memet Güler criticized the appearance of love and romance in a series that usually featured action scenes and violence and added, "Vadi has headed over heels in love, had made the fans reproach and say, 'Vadi has become a valley of love now.' Behind the Eros arrow stuck in Vadi, of course, there is a woman, Zeynep Günay Tan."

=== 2010–2015 ===
Tan's next project was Kanal D's drama series Öyle Bir Geçer Zaman ki, produced by D Productions. Starring Erkan Petekkaya, Ayça Bingöl and Wilma Elles, the series is a family drama. It premiered on 14 September 2010. Tan cast Aras Bulut İynemli in the series after seeing his performance in a commercial. The series reached high viewing numbers following its premiere, a success linked by Tan to its script, which is "a story that everyone can empathize with." Tan further added that "... while all the evils overlap in life, there is constant struggle and hope in the series. It's a job that tells how the characters overcame those challenges and where they came from in life." At the 2011 Golden Butterfly Awards, the series won the Best TV Series award. In the same year, Tan won the Best Drama Series Director award at the 2nd Antalya Television Awards. She was nominated in the same category in the following year. Habertürk newspaper wrote in August 2012 that the series had a successful first season, but "lost momentum and caused disappointment" with the second season and claimed that the series, which was normally planned to last for 5 seasons, would end with three seasons in total. The series eventually ended on 18 June 2013 after three seasons and with 120 episodes in total.

Following the finale of Öyle Bir Geçer Zaman ki, it was reported that Tan would work on another series produced by D Productions called Sırlar and Mete Horozoğlu her previous series was already cast in it. Horozoğlu said that the channel and the director were effective in his decision to join the project. About Tan he said, "In general, the script comes first in this sector, then the team is formed and the series is shot. When asked 'Why are we going to shoot this project?' the directors don't have an answer. But Zeynep always has an answer for this question." He stated that Tan wanted the project to be more American in terms of direction and light. Dolunay Soysert, another cast member, stated that she accepted the offer as she had always wanted to work with Zeynep Günay Tan. The series's title was later changed to Kayıp. Meanwhile, it was announced that the script would be written by Elif Usman Ergüden and the casting process was complete. Starring Horozoğlu, Soysert, Aslı Enver and Kaan Taşaner, the story starts after a boy from a rich family is arrested by the police and subsequently escapes. It premiered on 13 September 2013. The first episode was praised by columnist Ali Eyüboğlu, who believed that "despite the familiar way of starting its story, it is a series that can work well with its side stories." In December, it was reported that the series finale would be aired soon. However, Kanal D's then CEO İrfan Şahin announced that the series would continue, adding that in fact, each episode of Kayıp tended to solve all the mysteries as if it were the finale and then a new story would begin in the following episode. Kayıp ended on 27 January 2014 with 18 episodes in total.

In July 2015, Tan was announced to be the director of a new series produced by D Productions called Benim Adım Gültepe, which was planned to be broadcast on Kanal D in September and the shootings were due to take place in Konak, İzmir. Starring Horozoğlu, Ayça Bingöl and İlker Kızmaz, the series is set in the 1980s and focuses on the events taking place in a neighborhood called Gültepe. Günay Tan worked for 1.5 months to prepare the cast members for their roles and "embroidered every character like lace." Ekin Koç, one of the young actors in the series, talked about the preparation process and said, "The main role in this job is the director Zeynep Günay Tan. She is a perfectionist ... Also, her systematic attention to everything takes us to a very different point." The series premiered on 3 September 2014. Columnist Ceren Şehirlioğlu wrote that Benim Adım Gültepe reflects the feeling of grief to the audience "in all its authenticity" and director Günay Tan and writer Vural Yaşaroğlu created a revolution in the history of Turkish television with this work. Ali Eyüboğlu, however, found the series sloppy believing that the director and her team did not pay attention to details. As it did not get the required viewing figures, the series concluded with only 8 episodes.

In May 2015, it was reported that Günay Tan had started working with Timur Savcı and Tims Productions and was expected to work the historical drama Muhteşem Yüzyıl: Kösem. They were said to be looking for an actress to portray Kösem Sultan at the time. It was alleged that the director had problems with the actresses Anastasia Tsilimpiou and Hülya Avşar during the shooting, and therefore left the project. Producer Savcı denied these reports and announced that Tan had left the series for special reasons after the first episode. The series' first episode, which was directed by Tan, Yağız Alp Akaydın, Mert Baykal and Deniz Koloş, aired on 12 November 2015. In December 2015, it was reported that Tan had signed a new contract with O3 Medya.

=== 2016–2019 ===
Zeynep Günay Tan's first work with O3 Medya, Arkadaşlar İyidir, was broadcast on Show TV. The project's creative director was Deniz Koloş with whom Tan had previously worked. Starring Aslı Melisa Uzun, İdris Nebi Taşkan and Su Kutlu, the series is centered around the life of five university students and premiered on 28 August 2016. It made an early finale with its 10th episode on 30 October 2016, as it was claimed that it could not achieve the "desired rise in the ratings." Milliyet writer Asu Maro reacted to the premature ending of the series, which she thought was "a well-written, well-played and curiously watched project" and congratulated Günay Tan, Koloş and scriptwriter Ekin Atalar for their work. Another columnist, Sina Koloğlu, wrote that Arkadaşlar İyidir is the "most realistic youth series" of recent times and it was a "pity" to see it end.

In January 2017, Tan began shooting a new series for O3 Medya, which was set to be broadcast on Star TV. Starring Özcan Deniz and Aslı Enver, the series İstanbullu Gelin is about a mam who comes from a rich family in Bursa, but falls in love with a singer in Istanbul. It premiered on 3 March 2017. Günay Tan worked with Koloş on various episodes of this series. In 2017, İstanbullu Gelin was among the most searched TV series on Google in Turkey. In 2018, it was nominated for the Telenovela award at the 46th International Emmy Awards. İstanbullu Gelin concluded with 3 seasons and 87 episodes in total on 31 May 2019.

== Style and reception ==
"[Directing is like] making something real on paper, like putting the meat on the bone ... Making people believe in the existence of individuals who do not exist, and even believing it yourself after a point and getting to know other people and touch their lives through these individuals who are not real ... This sounds magical to me and is very beautiful."

— Zeynep Günay Tan describes her profession in an interview.

Zeynep Günay Tan has been described as "one of the most successful names of the young generation" in Turkey. She says that she likes working on projects that "have a story that is worth telling", because if she doesn't like the story "... directing the show turns into a civil service after a while. I'd never want that either." She describes her profession as a "dreamer"'s job and sees herself as a storyteller. Soysert, a cast member from Kayıp, described Tan as "A legendary director in the industry. Someone who walks into the undiscovered areas of an actor's talents and reveals his hidden feelings, knows how to make the actor play his role. You feel safe and good when working with her." Enver, who worked with Tan in Kayıp and İstanbullu Gelin, talked about her in a 2013 interview and said, "Our director Zeynep Günay Tan is a director who wants everything to be perfect and works for it; she does not want any scene to be empty of meaning." Kaan Taşaner praised Tan's ability in communicating with cast members believed that "Zeynep is a very clever director who shoots every scene when necessary and captures the details you cannot see as an actor. That's why working with her is so enjoyable." While Farah Zeynep Abdullah described Günay Tan as "an extraordinary teacher", Kürşat Alnıaçık said, "Zeynep brings you together with your character in the series based on your personality." Evrim Alasya talked about her initial fears of working with Tan and said, "I was getting comments about Zeynep such as 'You will not be able to work with another director, you will have a hard time'. After I started working with her, I understood better what they meant. You are pushing the boundaries with Zeynep enormously and you enjoy it incredibly."

== Personal life ==
Zeynep Günay Tan is married to fellow director Onur Tan. The couple have two sons.

== Filmography ==
=== As assistant director ===
Year	Title	Notes	Reference
2000	Üzülme Leyla		
2002	Abdülhamit Düşerken		
2002	Karşılaşma		
2003	Serseri Aşıklar		
2004	Büyük Yolculuk		
2004	Çemberimde Gül Oya		

=== As director ===
Year	Title	Notes	Reference
2005	Güz Yangını		
2006–2007	Kaybolan Yıllar		
2007–2008	Eşref Saati		
2009	Kurtlar Vadisi Pusu	10 episodes	
2010–2013	Öyle Bir Geçer Zaman ki		
2013–2014	Kayıp		
2014	Benim Adım Gültepe	with Deniz Koloş	
2015	Muhteşem Yüzyıl: Kösem	Episode: "Aslan, Kurt ve Kuzu"	
2016	Arkadaşlar İyidir	as creative director	
2017–2019	İstanbullu Gelin		
2021–2023	Kulüp		
2021–2022	Aziz		

== Awards and nominations ==
Award	Year	Work	Category	Result
38th Golden Butterfly Awards	2011	Öyle Bir Geçer Zaman ki	Best TV Series	Won
2nd Antalya Television Awards	2011	Öyle Bir Geçer Zaman ki	Best Drama Series Director	Won
2nd Antalya Television Awards	2011	Öyle Bir Geçer Zaman ki	Best Drama Series	Nominated
3rd Antalya Television Awards	2012	Öyle Bir Geçer Zaman ki	Best Drama Series Director	Nominated
3rd Antalya Television Awards	2012	Öyle Bir Geçer Zaman ki	Best Drama Series	Nominated
4th Antalya Television Awards	2013	Öyle Bir Geçer Zaman ki	Best Drama Series	Nominated
46th International Emmy Awards	2018	İstanbullu Gelin	Telenovela	Nominated
