= 10th Asia Pacific Screen Awards =

- Date: 2 December 2016
- Site: Brisbane Conventions and Exhibition Centre, Brisbane; Australia
- Hosted by: David Wenham, Anjali Rao

Highlights
- Most awards: Cold of Kalandar (3)
- Most nominations: Cold of Kalandar (4)

The 10th Asia Pacific Screen Awards were held on Thursday, 24 November 2016 at the Brisbane Conventions and Exhibition Centre in Brisbane, Australia.

On 9 September 2016, five juries were announced. They are an Academy Awards winner David Puttnam, a former chairman of Busan International Film Festival Kim Dong-ho, a current chairman of Busan International Film Festival Nansun Shi, an Academy Awards nominee and a Palme d'Or winner Jan Chapman and a Palme d'Or nominee Shyam Benegal.

David Wenham and Anjali Rao was announced as the host of the event on 2 November 2016. On the same day, a Grammy Awards winner Sumi Jo was also announced to perform at the event.

== Winners and nominees ==
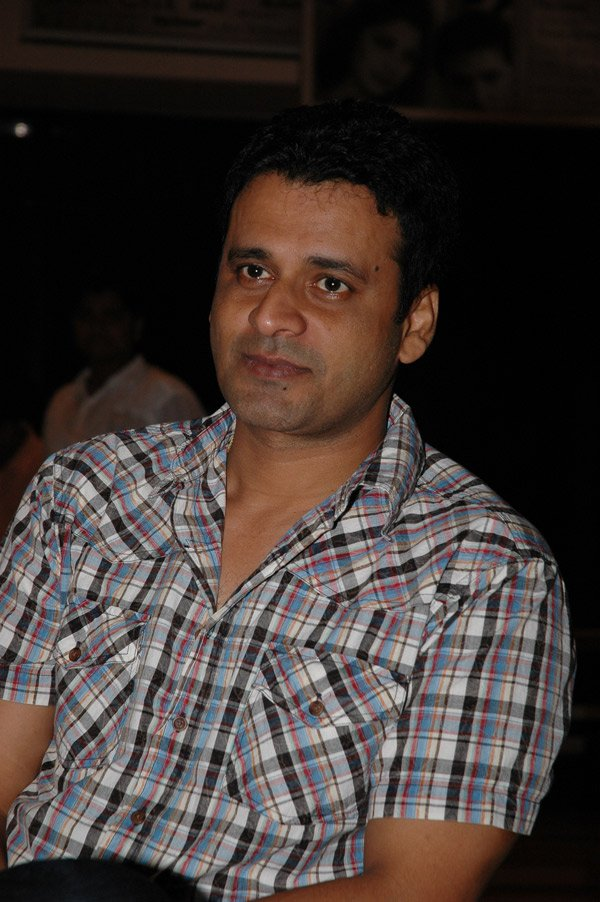
Manoj Bajpayee, Best Actor winner.

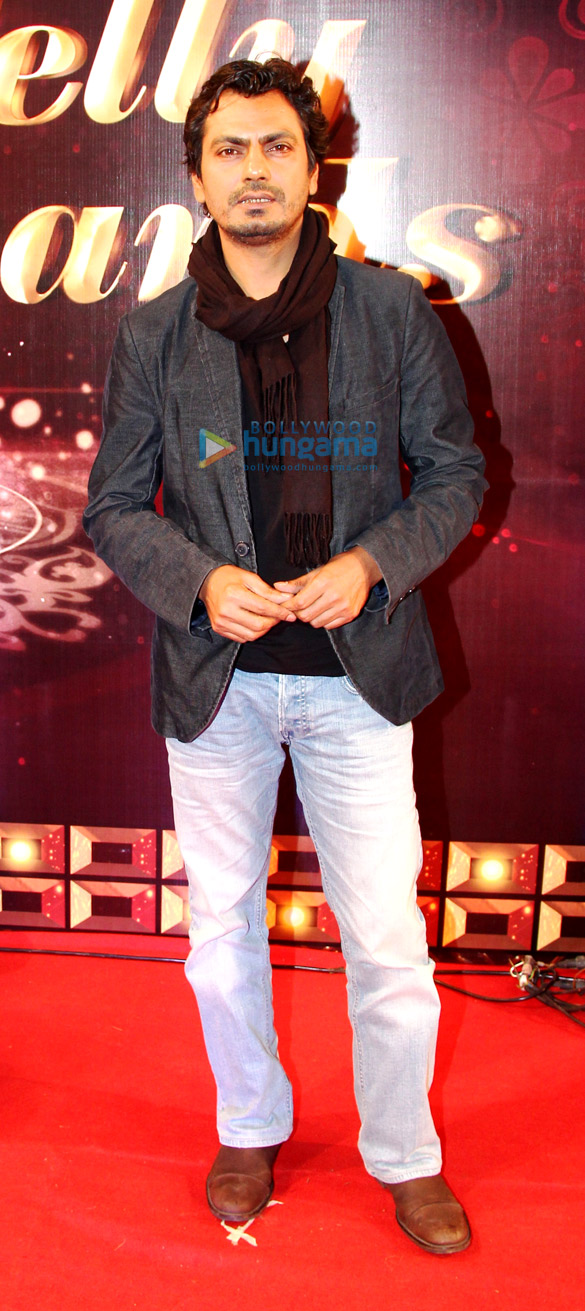
Nawazuddin Siddiqui, Best Actor special mention.

Youn Yuh-jung, Best Actress Jury Grand Prize winner.

Nominees for the Cultural Diversity Award was announced on 14 October 2016, followed by Animation, Documentary and Youth awards on 17 October and the nominees for the feature film was announced on 24 October 2016.

Best Feature Film	Achievement in Directing
(Turkey) Cold of Kalandar; (Russia) The Student; (Iran) Daughter; (Turkey) Ember; (Iran) Muhammad: The Messenger of God	(China) Feng Xiaogang - I Am Not Madame Bovary; (India) Anurag Kashyap - Psycho Raman; (China) Bi Gan - Kaili Blues; (South Korea) Lee Joon-ik - The Throne; (Turkey) Zeki Demirkubuz - Ember
Best Actor	Best Actress
(India) Manoj Bajpayee - Aligarh; (India) Sunny Pawar - Lion; (India) Nawazuddin Siddiqui - Psycho Raman; (United Kingdom) Dev Patel - Lion; (Iran) Farhad Aslani - Daughter; (South Korea) Song Kang-ho - The Throne	(Philippines) Hasmine Killip - Ordinary People; (South Korea) Youn Yuh-jung - The Bacchus Lady; (Russia) Agrippina Steklova - Insight; (Russia) Natalia Pavlenkova - Zoology; (Turkey) Aslihan Gürbüz - Ember
Best Screenplay	Achievement in Cinematography
(Japan) Ryusuke Hamaguchi, Tadashi Nohara & Tomoyuki Takahashi - Happy Hour; (India) Leena Yadav & Supratik Sen - Parched; (China) Yang Chao - Crosscurrent; (Iran) Mehran Kashani - Daughter; (India) Gurvinder Singh & Waryam Singh Sandhu - The Fourth Direction	(Turkey) Cevahir Şahin & Kürşat Üresin - Cold of Kalandar; (Taiwan) Mark Lee Ping Bing - Crosscurrent; (India) Jay Oza - Psycho Raman; (China) Wang Tianxing - Kaili Blues; (Spain) Gorka Gómez Andreu - House of Others; (Italy) Vittorio Storaro - Muhammad: The Messenger of God
Best Animated Feature Film	Best Documentary Feature Film
(South Korea) Seoul Station; (United Arab Emirates) Bilal; (Philippines) Manang Biring; (Russia) Savva; (Russia) Sheep and Wolves	(Iran) Starless Dreams; (Myanmar) City of Jade; (Cambodia) (France) Exile; (Australia) (Norway) Snow Monkey; (Russia) Under the Sun
Best Youth Feature Film	Cultural Diversity Award
(South Korea) The World of Us; (Iran) Breath; (India) The Quest; (Denmark) (Afghanistan) Wolf and Sheep; (India) The Trap	(Iraq) Hussein Hassan - The Dark Wind; (Russia) Dmitrii Davydov - The Bonfire; (Egypt) Tamer El Said - In the Last Days of the City; (China) Wang Xuebo - Knife in the Clear Water; (Turkey) Mustafa Kara - Cold of Kalandar
Young Cinema Award
(Turkey) Mustafa Kara - Cold of Kalandar; (China) Bi Gan - Kaili Blues

1. Though they do not win, they're the winners of Jury Grand Prize.
2. Though they do not win, they received a "special mention".

== Multiple wins and nominations ==
The following films received multiple nominations:

Nominations	Film
4	Cold of Kalandar
3	Daughter
3	Ember
3	Kaili Blues
3	Psycho Raman
2	Crosscurrent
2	Lion
2	Muhammad: The Messenger of God
2	The Throne

The following film received multiple awards:

Wins	Film
3	Cold of Kalandar

The following countries received multiple nominations:

Nominations	Country
10	India
7	Russia
7	Turkey
6	China
6	Iran
5	South Korea
2	Philippines

The following countries received multiple awards:

Wins	Country
3	Turkey
2	South Korea
