= Ali Seçkiner Alıcı =

Turkish actor and musician

- Born: 3 July 1965 (age 61); Kars, Turkey
- Education: Gazi University
- Occupations: Musician, actor, singer
- Years active: 1993–present

Ali Seçkiner Alıcı (born 3 July 1965) is a Turkish musician and actor.

== Life and career ==
He was born on 3 July 1965, in Kars. In 1985 graduated from the Music Education Department of Gazi University. After 4 years of music education, he became a member of the Devlet Çoksesli Korosu that was established in 1988 as a bassist. He left it in 2017. Alıcı at the same time in Ankara was participating working in plays, as a music director and education consultant. Beside the films and tv shows that he was a part of precedingly, he was a leading role in Mahmut Fazıl Coşkuns 75. Venice Film Festival participating film The Announcement and Çağıl Bocut's first feature film Sardunya. At the same time he had important roles in popular projects such as "Bergen", "Love Me Instead", "Yargı", "Bizim için Şampiyon". His latest event was the 75th Cannes Film Festival's "Un Certain Regard" sections International premier of Emin Alper's latest film "Kurak Günler".

=== Other ===
Alıcı was among the top searched people in 2022 with over 9-thousand news sources about him that year.

== Filmography ==
Cinema
Year	Production	Role	Notes
2024	Köpekle Kurt Arasında		
2024	Ayşe	Recep	
2022	Tamirhane	Kayhan	
2022	Gönül	Hogir	
2022	Burning Days (Kurak Günler)	Yavuz	
2022	Bergen	Cevdet	
2021	Beni Çok Sev	Apo	
2021	Sabırsızlık Zamanı		
2021	Kerr		
2021	İki Şafak Arasında	Orhan	
2020	Sardunya	Nadir	
2020	Dur Bak Dinle Geç		Short film
2019	Söz Senettir	İdris	
2018	Bizim İçin Şampiyon	Hasan Karataş	
2017	Finiş	İlyas	Short film
2017	Anons	Reha	
TV
Year	Production	Role	Channel
2024	Kalpazan	İrfan	Show TV
2022–2024	Ben Bu Cihana Sığmazam	Kurban Baba	atv
2022	Kuş Uçuşu	konuk	Netflix
2022	Oğlum	Hüseyin	Show TV
2021	Yargı	Zafer Erguvan	Kanal D
2021	10 Bin Adım	Esnaf	GAİN
2021	50M2	Azrail	Netflix
2020–2021	Arıza	Hasan Kırbaş	Show TV
2019	Bir Aile Hikayesi	Şakir Mutlu	FOX
2018	Şahsiyet	Naim Türedi	puhutv
2017	Yüz Yüze		Show TV
2009	Komşu Köyün Delisi	Aşık Kalender	TRT 1
2000	Saksıdaki Ağaç	Aşık Deruni	TRT 1
1993	Ferhunde Hanımlar	Eşber	TRT 1
Theater
Year	Play	Role	Notes
2022	Şehirde Kimse Yokken	Nurullah	
2019	Bir Alaturka Hikayet – Raif ile Letafet		Müzik
2015	Azizname	Oyuncu	
2013	Selamün Kavlen Karakolu	Oyuncu	Müzik
2012	Zübük	Oyuncu	Müzik
2011	Giderayak		Müzik

== Musicianship ==
- Erzurum Çarşı Pazar
- Bozlak
- Abaro
- Turnalar Semahı
- Sabahın Seherinde
- Yemen
- Ankara'da Yedim Taze Meyveyi
- Kiziroğlu
- Zahid
- Yemen
- Oğul Eminem
- Çanakkale
