= Cindoruk =

Cindoruk is a Turkish-language surname. Notable people with the surname include:

- Caner Cindoruk, Turkish actor and theatre director
- Hüsamettin Cindoruk (1933–2026), Turkish politician, M.P.
