= Aras Bulut İynemli =

Turkish actor (born 1990)

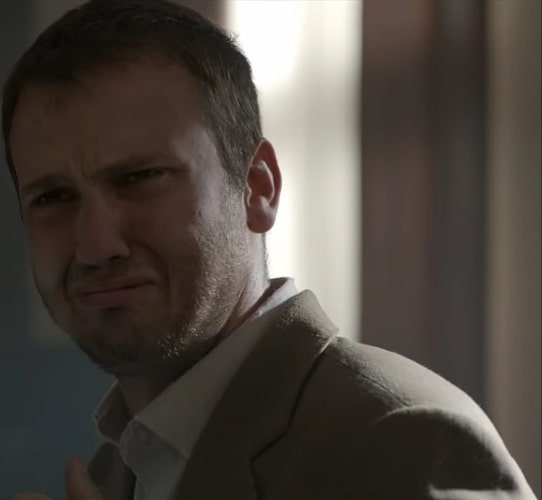
- İynemli in 7. Koğuştaki Mucize
- Born: 25 August 1990 (age 36); Istanbul, Turkey
- Education: Istanbul Technical University
- Occupation: Actor
- Years active: 2009–present
- Relatives: Miray Daner (cousin)

Aras Bulut İynemli (born 25 August 1990) is a Turkish actor. He is best known for his performances in As Time Goes by (2010–2013), Insider (2016–2017), The Pit (2017–2021), Miracle in Cell No.7 (2019), and Atatürk 1881 - 1919 (2023, 2024), the latter earned him a Turkish Film Critics Association Award nomination for Best Actor. In 2018, İynemli won the Golden Butterfly Award for Best Actor for his role in The Pit.

== Career ==
After playing a role in 2–3 commercials, he got a role in the drama series Öyle Bir Geçer Zaman ki in 2010. This drama gained international success and İynemli received a reward as well. Before this he had also worked in the drama Back Street, but he took a hiatus after the first part as he had to complete his education of aircraft engineering. He performed in the top 100 in the university entrance exam ÖSS in Turkey, which is similar to the (SAT) exam in the US. He continued his studies in the Aeronautical Engineering department at the Istanbul Technical University.It was reported that he has a IQ of 129. In 2011, while he was 20 he received the Antalya Television Award for Best Supporting Actor.

In 2013 he appeared in the Azerbaijani-Turkish movie Mahmut and Meryem, based on a novel by Elçin Efendiyev. He played a disabled boy in Tamam mıyız? and portrayed Şehzade Bayezid on Muhteşem Yüzyıl in the same year.

In 2015, İynemli was selected to play the main male character in the series Maral: En Güzel Hikayem together with the actress Hazal Kaya. In 2016–17, he played the role of Umut Yılmaz / Mert Karadağ in İçerde. In 2017, he began playing the role of Yamaç Koçovalı in Çukur.

In 2019, İynemli portrayed a mentally ill father who was wrongly imprisoned for murder in 7. Koğuştaki Mucize, which broke viewing records in Turkey within a short period. After the movie was broadcast on Netflix, it was well received by audience in France and Latin America. Brazilian football player Neymar also stated on his Instagram story that he cried like a baby after watching this film.

In addition to his acting career, İynemli has appeared in many advertising films and is the face of numerous brands.

== Personal life ==
He has an older brother, actor Orçun İynemli and an older sister, television host and singer Yeşim İynemli. Other relatives who are actors are Miray Daner (cousin), Cengiz Daner (uncle) and İlhan Daner (great uncle).

In September 18 2026, Aras Bulut İynemli was among 18 Turkish celebrities investigated in a drug-related case in Istanbul. Authorities detained him and conducted searches and forensic testing as part of an investigation into suspected drug use, facilitating drug use, or providing venues for it. İynemli denied all allegations and said he voluntarily gave police access to his phone. He rejected “effective remorse”, saying he had committed no crime and had nothing to confess.

== Filmography ==
=== Film ===
| Year | Title | Original title | Role | Notes |
|---|---|---|---|---|
| 2013 | Mahmut And Meryem | Mahmut ile Meryem | Mahmut | Leading role |
| 2013 | Are We OK? | Tamam mıyız? | İhsan | Leading role |
| 2017 | The Lord of the Seagull | Martıların Efendisi | Taxi driver | Cameo |
| 2019 | Miracle in Cell No.7 | 7. Koğuştaki Mucize | Memo | Leading role |
| 2023 | Atatürk 1881 - 1919 | Atatürk 1881 - 1919 | Mustafa Kemal Atatürk | Leading role |
| 2024 | Atatürk II 1881 - 1919 | Atatürk II 1881 - 1919 | Mustafa Kemal Atatürk | Leading role |

=== Television ===
| Year | Title | Original title | Role | Network | Notes |
|---|---|---|---|---|---|
| 2009 | Back Streets | Arka Sokaklar | Sener | Kanal D | Cameo; 1 episode |
| 2010–2013 | As Time Goes by | Öyle Bir Geçer Zaman ki | Mete Akarsu | Kanal D | Main role; 120 episodes |
| 2013–2014 | Magnificent Century | Muhteşem Yüzyıl | Şehzade Bayezid | Star TV | Main role; season 4, 36 episodes |
| 2015 | Maral: My Most Beautiful Story | Maral: En Güzel Hikayem | Sarp Altan | TV8 | Leading role; 17 episodes |
| 2015 | The Voice Turkey Christmas Special | O Ses Türkiye Yılbaşı Özel | Himself | TV8 | "Tonight" Episode |
| 2016–2017 | Insider | İçerde | Umut Yılmaz / Mert Karadağ | Show TV | Leading role; 39 episodes |
| 2017–2021 | The Pit | Çukur | Yamaç Koçovalı | Show TV | Leading role; 132 episodes |
| 2019 | Crash | Çarpışma | Yamaç Koçovalı | Show TV | Cameo; 1 episode |
| 2024–2025 | Genius | Deha | Devran Karan | Show TV | Leading role; 31 episode |

== Awards and nominations ==
Name of the award ceremony, year presented, category, nominee of the award, and the result of the nomination
| Award | Year | Category | Nominated Work | Result | Ref. |
|---|---|---|---|---|---|
| Antalya Golden Orange Film Festival | 2024 | Achievement Award | Himself | Won | |
| Golden Butterfly Awards | 2017 | Best Actor – Television Series Drama | Insider | Nominated | |
| Golden Butterfly Awards | 2018 | Best Couple – Television Series | The Pit (with Dilan Çiçek Deniz) | Nominated | |
| Golden Butterfly Awards | 2018 | Best Actor – Television Series Drama | The Pit | | |
| Golden Butterfly Awards | 2018 | Best Actor – Television Series Drama | The Pit | Won | |
| Golden Butterfly Awards | 2019 | Best Actor – Television Series Drama | The Pit | Nominated | |
| Golden Butterfly Awards | 2019 | Best Couple – Television Series | The Pit (with Dilan Çiçek Deniz) | Nominated | |
| Golden Butterfly Awards | 2024 | Best Couple – Television Series | Genius (with Ahsen Eroğlu) | Nominated | |
| Golden Butterfly Awards | 2024 | Best Actor – Television Series Drama | Genius | Nominated | |
| Golden Palm Awards | 2024 | Movie Actor of the Year | Atatürk 1881 - 1919 | Nominated | |
| Golden Palm Awards | 2024 | Best Drama Actor of the Year | Genius | Won | |
| International Izmir Festival | 2020 | Best Actor – Film | Miracle in Cell No. 7 | Won | |
| International Izmir Festival | 2020 | Best Actor – Television Series | The Pit | Nominated | |
| Mevcut Bilgi Awards | 2024 | Best Actor of the Year | Genius | Nominated | |
| Mevcut Bilgi Awards | 2024 | Best Television Couple of the Year | Genius (with Ahsen Eroğlu) | Nominated | |
| Mevcut Bilgi Awards | 2024 | Best Television Couple of the Year | Genius (with Melis Sezen) | Nominated | |
| Turkish Film Critics Association | 2023 | Best Actor | Atatürk 1881 - 1919 | Nominated | |

| Year | Award | Category | Work | Result |
|---|---|---|---|---|
| 2011 | Özel Alev Schools Awards | Best Actor | Öyle Bir Geçer Zaman Ki | Won |
| 2011 | Antalya Television Awards | Best Supporting Actor | Öyle Bir Geçer Zaman Ki | Won |
| 2011 | TelevizyonDizisi.com (The Bests) Awards | Best Supporting Actor | Öyle Bir Geçer Zaman Ki | Won |
| 2014 | Sadri Alışık Theatre and Cinema Awards | Ekrem Bora Promising Actor | Tamam mıyız? | Won |
| 2016 | Istanbul University Mode Awards | Most Stylish Actor of the Year | Himself | Won |
| 2016 | 7th İMK Social Media Awards | Best Actor | İçerde | Nominated |
| 2017 | 5th Bilkent TV Awards | Best Drama Actor | İçerde | Nominated |
| 2017 | 1st Müzikonair Awards | Best TV Series Actor | İçerde | Nominated |
| 2017 | 24th İTÜ EMÖS Achievement Awards | Most Successful Actor of the Year | İçerde | Nominated |
| 2017 | 6th TURKMSIC The Bests of the Year Awards | Best Actor of the Year | İçerde | Nominated |
| 2017 | 12th İTÜ Makinistanbul Media, Art and Sport Awards | Epgik Special Awards | İçerde | Won |
| 2017 | 8th KTÜ Media Awards | Most Popular Actor | İçerde | Nominated |
| 2017 | 11th GSÜ EN Awards | Best TV/Cinema Actor | İçerde | Nominated |
| 2017 | 1st Turkey Children's Awards | Best TV Series Actor | İçerde | Nominated |
| 2017 | Yeditepe University 5th Dilek Awards | Best Actor | İçerde | Won |
| 2017 | Okan University The Bests of the Year Awards | Best TV Series Actor | İçerde | Won |
| 2018 | The ONE awards | Reputable Face Of A Brand | Himself | Won |
| 2018 | 13th Kemal Sunal Culture And Art Awards | Best Actor Of The Year | Çukur | Won |
| 2018 | Yeditepe University 6th Dilek Awards | Best Actor | Çukur | Won |
| 2018 | MGD 23rd Golden Objective Awards | Best Actor | Çukur | Won |
| 2018 | 9th Quality of Magazine Awards | Top Quality Actor | Çukur | Won |
| 2018 | GQ Turkey 2018 | Men of the Year | Çukur | Won |
| 2019 | 7th Bilkent TV Awards | Best Drama Actor | Çukur | Won |
| 2019 | 13th Galatasaray University The Bests Awards | Best TV Series Actor of the Year | Çukur | Nominated |
| 2019 | Turkey Youth Awards | Best Actor | Çukur | Nominated |
| 2019 | 25th AYAL Awards | Best Actor of the Year | Çukur | Won |
| 2019 | 9th Elle Style Awards | Elle Style Actor Of The Year | Çukur | Won |
| 2020 | Turkey Youth Awards | Best Actor | Çukur | Nominated |
| 2020 | Social Media Awards | Best Instagram Actor | Çukur | Won |
| 2020 | Ayaklı Newspaper Awards | Best Cinema Actor | 7. Koğuştaki Mucize | Won |
| 2020 | 8th Yeditepe Dilek Awards | Best Cinema Actor | 7. Koğuştaki Mucize | Won |
| 2020 | Turkey Youth Awards | Best Cinema Actor | 7. Koğuştaki Mucize | Won |
| 2020 | 34th Se-Sam Awards | Turkish Cinema From Past To Future | 7. Koğuştaki Mucize | Won |
| 2020 | 1st Sinemaport Awards | Best Cinema Actor | 7. Koğuştaki Mucize | Won |
| 2022 | 4th IKU Career Honorary Awards Tour | Most Popular Advertising Face of the Year | Himself | Won |
| 2023 | 60th Antalya Golden Orange Film Festival | Achievement Awards | Himself | Won |
| 2023 | 17th Galatasaray University The Bests Awards | Best Male Actor Of The Year | Ataturk | Nominated |
| 2023 | Ugur Mumca Memorial And Award Ceremony | Best Male Actor | Ataturk | Won |
| 2024 | Ayaklı Newspaper Awards | Best Cinema Actor | Ataturk | Won |
| 2024 | Filmsan Drama And Cinema Awards | Best Cinema Actor | Ataturk | Won |
