= Yeliz =

- Gender: Feminine
- Language: Turkish

Origin
- Language: Turkish
- Origin: "yeliz"
- Derivation: "yeliz"
- Meaning: "beautiful", "luminous", "brightly", "spacious"

Yeliz is a common feminine Turkish given name. In Turkish, "Yeliz" means "beautiful", "luminous", "brightly", and/or "spacious".

== Given name ==
- Yeliz Açar (born 1997), Turkish women's footballer
- Yeliz Ay (born 1977), Turkish racewalker
- Yeliz Başa (born 1987), Turkish volleyball player
- Yeliz Fındık (born 1976), Turkish martial artist
- Yeliz Kurt (born 1984), Turkish middle distance runner
- Yeliz Kuvancı (born 1985), Turkish actress
- Yeliz Özel (born 1980), Turkish handball player
- Yeliz Topaloğlu (born 1978), Turkish football referee
- Yeliz Yılmaz (born 1980), Turkish handball player
