= Deha (TV series) =

Turkish television series

- Also known as: The Good & The Bad
- Genre: Thriller; Action
- Created by: Damla Serim
- Directed by: Umut Aral
- Starring: Aras Bulut İynemli; Uğur Polat; Taner Ölmez; Onur Saylak; Melis Sezen; Ahsen Eroğlu; Emel Göksu; Muhammed Cangören
- Music by: Toygar Işıklı
- Country of origin: Turkey
- Original language: Turkish
- No. of seasons: 1
- No. of episodes: 31

Production
- Executive producer: Asli Öner
- Producer: Kerem Çatay
- Production location: Istanbul
- Running time: 120 minutes
- Production company: Ay Yapım

Original release
- Network: Show TV
- Release: 22 September 2024 – 18 May 2025

Deha (lit. 'Genius') (English Title: The Good & The Bad) is a Turkish action thriller television series developed by Ay Yapım. Created by Damla Serim and directed by Umut Aral, the series started airing on 22 September 2024.

It delivered the strongest debut of the season and ranked among the top five television dramas with the highest rating increases in their second episodes. The series went on to win the Best Series Award at the Seoul International Drama Awards and the International Emmy Award for Best Telenovela.

== Cast ==
- Aras Bulut İynemli as Devran Karan
- Uğur Polat as Iskender Karan
- Taner Ölmez as Cesur Karan
- Onur Saylak as Sofi / Ali Haydar
- Melis Sezen as İmre Karan
- Ahsen Eroğlu as Esme
- Seda Akman as Aysel Karan
- Zuhal Gencer as Gülce Karan
- Emel Göksu as Cavidan Karan
- Cenk Kangöz as Hakim Nalkoparan
- Taner Rumeli as Yusuf Nalkoparan (Karga)
- Umutcan Ütebay as Yaman Karan
- Çağan Efe Ak as Boran Karan
- Eylül Ersöz as Ceylan Karan
- Oğulcan Arman Uslu as Ferman Karan
- Abdurrahman Yunusoğlu as Cengiz
- Muhammed Cangören as Ihsan Nalkoparan
- Çağrı Atakan as Kadir
- Ali Berge as Timuçin
