= Atatürk (film) =

Turkish epic biographical film

- Film poster
- Directed by: Mehmet Ada Öztekin
- Written by: Necati Şahin
- Starring: Aras Bulut İynemli
- Cinematography: Torben Forsberg
- Edited by: Zeki Öztürk; Ruşen Dağhan
- Music by: Batu Sener
- Production companies: Lanistar Medya; O3 Medya
- Release dates: 29 October 2023 (Part I); 5 January 2024 (Part II)
- Running time: 132 minutes (Part I); 142 minutes (Part II)
- Country: Turkey
- Language: Turkish

Atatürk is a two-part Turkish epic biographical historical drama film directed by Mehmet Ada Öztekin and written by Necati Şahin. The film follows the life of the founding father of the Republic of Turkey, Mustafa Kemal Atatürk. It stars Aras Bulut İynemli in the title role, alongside an ensemble supporting cast.

The first part of the film, titled Atatürk 1881 - 1919 premiered on October 29, 2023 and the second one, Atatürk II 1881 - 1919 premiered on January 5, 2024, both in Turkey. Both of them were later released on Amazon Prime Video.

== Cast ==
- Aras Bulut İynemli as Mustafa Kemal Atatürk
  - Emre Mete Sönmez as child Mustafa Kemal Atatürk
- Songül Öden as Zübeyde Hanım
- Sarp Akkaya as Enver Pasha
- Esra Bilgiç as Madam Corinne
- Mehmet Günsür as Ali Rıza Efendi
- Celile Toyon as Yaşlı Kadın
- Darko Perić as Stiliyan Kovachev
- Oğulcan Arman Uslu as İsmet İnönü
- Alican Barlas as Kâzım Karabekir
- Berk Cankat as Ali Fuat Cebesoy
- Meriç Özkaya as Talaat Pasha
- Cahit Gök as Djemal Pasha
- Sahra Şaş as Makbule Atadan
- Bertan Asllani as Ali Fethi Okyar
- Beran Kotan as Ömer Naci
- Doğaç Yıldız as Rauf Orbay
- Şehsuvar Aktaş as Mehmed VI
- Hamdi Alkan as Ali Rıza Pasha
- Lidija Kordić as Dimitrina Kovacheva
- Predrag Bjelac as Otto Liman von Sanders
- John James as Colmar von der Goltz
- Emre Yetim as Lütfü Bey
- Devrim Özder Akın as Hüseyin Bey
- Bülent Polat as Şemsi Efendi
- Atakan Yarımdünya as Yakub Cemil
- Alpay Kemal Atalan as Mehmet Esat Bülkat
- Sinan Arslan as Cevat Abbas Gürer
