= Sadakatsiz =

Turkish television series

- Promotional poster
- Also known as: A Woman Scorned
- Genre: Psychological thriller
- Created by: Michael Bartlett
- Based on: Doctor Foster by Mike Bartlett
- Developed by: Mike Bartlett
- Written by: Kemal Hamamcıoğlu (1-31); Dilara Pamuk (1-31); Arzu Daştan Mutlu (32-42); Mustafa Mutlu (32-42); Gamze Arslan (32-42); Nuriye Bilici (32-42); Arzu Yurtseven (43-60); Elif Öner (43-60); Kubilay Kara (43-60); İrem Pelin Sönmezer (43-60); Mike Bartlett
- Directed by: Neslihan Yeşilyurt (1-60); Benal Tairi (5-18)
- Starring: Cansu Dere; Caner Cindoruk; Melis Sezen
- Composer: Cem Öget
- Country of origin: Turkey
- Original language: Turkish
- No. of seasons: 2
- No. of episodes: 60

Production
- Executive producer: Seda Peker Özkan
- Producer: Fatih Aksoy
- Production locations: Istanbul; Tekirdağ
- Camera setup: 576i (16:9 SDTV); 1080i (HDTV)
- Running time: 120 minutes
- Production companies: BBC Studios; Med Yapim; Mednova

Original release
- Network: Kanal D
- Release: 7 October 2020 – 25 May 2022

The Unfaithful (Turkish: Sadakatsiz) is a Turkish television series starring Cansu Dere, Caner Cindoruk and Melis Sezen, and produced by Medyapım and Mednova for Kanal D. The first episode was published on October 7, 2020. It was directed by Neslihan Yeşilyurt and written by Kemal Hamamcıoğlu and Dilara Pamuk in the first season, and by Arzu Daştan Mutlu, Mustafa Mutlu, Gamze Arslan and Nuriye Bilici in the second season. The series is adapted and based on BBC One's 2015 drama series Doctor Foster. The series, which consisted of 2 seasons, ended with its 60th episode aired on May 25, 2022.

== Plot ==
=== Season 1 ===
Doctor Asya Yilmaz (Cansu Dere) lives a peaceful and happy life in Tekirdağ with her husband Volkan (Caner Cindoruk) and their son Ali (Alp Akar). This situation changes when she learns that her husband has been having an affair with a young woman named Derin (Melis Sezen) for two years. Asya must choose between saving her marriage or taking revenge on her unfaithful husband.

=== Season 2 ===
Having survived the accident with Derin, Asya has left her life in Tekirdağ and moved to Istanbul. Trying to build a new life with her son Ali, Asya crosses paths with Aras (Berkay Ateş), who's had an accident while Asya is on her way to Tekirdağ for Bahar's wedding.

== Cast ==
- Cansu Dere as Asya Yılmaz/Arslan
- Caner Cindoruk as Volkan Arslan
- Melis Sezen as Derin Güçlü/Arslan
- Özge Özder as Derya Samanlı
- Gözde Seda Altuner as Gönül Güçlü
- Nazlı Bulum as Nil Tetik/Güçlü
- Taro Emir Tekin as Selçuk Dağci/Güçlü
- Yeliz Kuvancı as Bahar Gelik/Erginer
- Alp Akar as Ali Arslan
- Meltem Baytok as Cavidan
- Zerrin Nişancı as Nevin
- Doğan Can Sarıkaya as Demir Güçlü
- Yaren Vera Salma as Zeynep Arslan
- Gamze Büyükbaşoğlu as Pelin
- Berkay Ateş as Aras Ateşoğlu
- Aslı Orcan as Leyla Ateşoğlu
- Burak Sergen as Haluk Güçlü
- Şafak Başkaya as Kadir Güneş
- Ali İl as Melih Erginer
- Mahmut Gökgöz as Altan Saygıner
- Kenan Ece as Turgay Güngör
- Aydan Taş as Diidem Aktaş
- Bennu Yıldırımlar as Asya Günalan
- Onur Berk Arslanoğlu as Faruk Günçay
- Name Önal as Nazan Günçay
- Melisa Döngel as Hicran Dağcı
- Cemal Hünal as Sinan Taşkıran
- Olcay Yusufoğlu as Serap Şenlik
- Eren Vurdem as Mert Gelik
- Dora Dalgıç as Selen
- Ceren Çiçek as İpek

== See also ==
- The World of the Married
