= Yeliz Kuvancı =

Turkish actress (born 1987)

- Born: 3 April 1987 (age 38); Ankara, Turkey
- Occupation: Actress
- Years active: 2010–present

Yeliz Kuvancı (born 3 April 1987) is a Turkish actress.

== Life and career ==
Kuvancı was born on 3 April 1987 in Ankara. Kuvancı, who had no plans for becoming an actress in her childhood, went to an educational institution that provided theatrical education with the encouragement of her father. She graduated from Beykent University, School of Fine Arts, Department of Acting.

In 2010, she made her television debut with her role in Öyle Bir Geçer Zaman ki as İnci, a music instructor. After appearing as a regular on the series for one season, between 2011 and 2012 she starred in the comedy series Seni Bana Yazmışlar, sharing the lead role with Cemal Hünal, Ali İl and Dilşad Çelebi. She continued her career by joining the cast of TRT series Böyle Bitmesin alongside Sadakatsiz's co-star Ali İl for third time. Kuvancı then portrayed the character of Güneş in Kocamın Ailesi and Itır in Hangimiz Sevmedik. In 2020, she appeared as a regular on the TRT series Tutunamayanlar, before being cast in Sadakatsiz, the local adaptation of Doctor Foster.

== Filmography ==
Television
Year	Title	Role	Notes
2010–2011	Öyle Bir Geçer Zaman ki	İnci Öğretmen	Supporting role
2011–2012	Seni Bana Yazmışlar	Zeynep	Leading role
2012–2014	Böyle Bitmesin	Nazlı	Leading role
2014–2015	Kocamın Ailesi	Güneş	Leading role
2016–2017	Hangimiz Sevmedik	Itır Yeşil	Leading role
2020	Tutunamayanlar	Ayşe Şakrak	Supporting role
2020–2022	Sadakatsiz	Bahar Ergener	Supporting role
Web
Year	Title	Role	Platform
2023	Özur Dilerim	Canan	Disney+
