= Sardunya =

2021 film by Çağıl Bocut

Geranium
- Turkish: Sardunya
- Directed by: Cagil Bocut
- Written by: Cagil Bocut
- Story by: Cagil Bocut
- Produced by: Caglar Bocut & Aslı Erdem
- Starring: Evren Duyal Zeyno Eracar Ahsen Eroğlu İlayda Elif Elhih Ali Seçkiner Alıcı
- Edited by: Mesut Ulutaş
- Music by: Cafer Ozan Türkyılmaz
- Production company: Kolor
- Release date: 12 February 2021
- Running time: 83 minutes
- Country: Turkey
- Language: Turkish

Sardunya (Geranium) is a 2021 film portraying the trials and tribulations of 19-year-old Defne as she spends time with her father in the countryside following his stroke. The film starring İlayda Elif Elhih as Defne and Ali Seçkiner Alıcı as her father was written and directed by Cagil Bocut; his first feature-length film. It was nominated for and won several awards such as at the Istanbul International Film Festival.

== Plot ==
19-year-old Defne is University student in Istanbul. She receives a phone call during her driving exam and learns that her father had a stroke. This leads her to leave Istanbul and return to Urla to live with her father. Both see these difficult times as a good opportunity to mend their relationship. Her sick aunt is staying in the same house with Defne and her father as well, which further complicates the situation at home. Throughout the film, we witness Defne's relationship with her family and the difficulties of the situation that she is in.

== Major cast ==
Character	Actor
Defne	İlayda Elif Elhih
Nadir	Ali Seçkiner Alıcı
Mari	Evren Duyal
Nur	Zeyno Eracar
Harun	Tansu Biçer
Gizem	Ahsen Eroğlu
Yasemin	İrem Taşdemir Akçan

== Awards and nominations ==
Year	Occasion	Award - Category	Recipient	Result
2021	International Istanbul Film Festival	Best Actress	İlayda Elif Elhih	Won
2021	International Istanbul Film Festival	Best Director of Photography	Orçun Özkılınç	Won
2021	International Istanbul Film Festival	Seyfi Teoman Best First Film Award	Cagil Bocut, Caglar Bocut, Kolor	Won
2021	International Istanbul Film Festival	Best Music		Nominated
2021	FilmFestival Cottbus	Best Debut Film	Cagil Bocut, Caglar Bocut, Kolor	Won
2021	Ankara International Film Festival	Best First Film	Cagil Bocut, Caglar Bocut, Kolor	Won
2021	Singapore International Film Festival	Silver Screen Award - Best Director - Asian Feature Film	Cagil Bocut, Kolor	Nominated
2022	Tirana International Film Festival	Best Debut Film Award		Nominated
2021	Malatya International Film Festival	Crystal Apricot Award - Best Film	Cagil Bocut	Nominated
2022	International Frankfurt Turkish Film Festival	Best Actor	Ali Seçkiner Alıcı, Kolor	Won
2022	International Frankfurt Turkish Film Festival	Best Film - Best Cinematography	Orçun Özkılınç, Kolor	Won
2021	Cinequest San Jose Film Festival	Best First Feature	Cagil Bocut, Kolor	Nominated
2022	Cinema Jove - Valencia International Film Festival	Moon of Valencia	Cagil Bocut	Nominated
2022	Beijing International Film Festival	Forward Future Award - Most Popular Feature Film	Cagil Bocut	Nominated
2022	Beijing International Film Festival	Forward Future Award - Best New Film	Cagil Bocut	Nominated
2022	Izmir International Film and Music Festival			Nominated

The film also participated in the 2020-2021 Singapore International Film Festival that went from 26 November to 6 December, in the section for first-time and second-time Asian directors, along with 7 other films. In the 22nd International Frankfurt Turkish Film Festival it won in the category of best cinematography. It also won the 2nd Izmir International Film and Music Festival.

== Production team ==
Writer and Director	Cagil Bocut
Producer	Caglar Bocut & Aslı Erdem
Photography Director	Orçun Özkılınç
Assistant Director	Gülgün Dedeçam
Art Director	Onur Yılmaz
Fiction	Mesut Ulutaş
Assistant Producer	Susanne Mann
Costume Design	Meltem Günaydın
Casting	Ezgi Baltaş
Festival Consultant	Uğur Şahin
Music	Ozan Türkyılmaz
Sound Design	Uğur Akagündüz
Color	Cenk Erol
Lights	Murat Can Yozgatlı
Audio Mixing	Luis Silva
