= İlayda Elif Elhih =

Turkish actress

- Education: Pera Güzel Sanatlar Lisesi; Kadir Has University
- Occupation: Actor
- Years active: 2020–present
- Awards: 40th Best Female Actor (2021)

İlayda Elif Elhih is a Turkish film actress and theatrologist.

== Life and career ==
İlayda Elif Elhih studied theater in high school and graduated from Pera Fine Arts High School. She graduated from Kadir Has University in 2018. In her podcast with Üretim Kaydı, Elhih mentioned that she had taken her steps in a way that she already knew that she wanted back in her high school years and also mentioned the support of her family.

She won the Best Actress award at the 40th International Istanbul Film Festival with her first film Sardunya. Elhih could not attend the award ceremony and learned that she had won this award through the producer of the film, Çağıl Bocut.

Elhih said in an interview, "I want to do work that doesn't take the mind of the audience lightly."

== Filmography ==
=== Film ===
| Year | Film title | Character |
|---|---|---|
| 2020 | Sardunya | Defne |

=== TV show ===
| Year | Show Title | Character |
|---|---|---|
| 2020–2021 | Çukur | Saliha |

== Awards and nominations ==
| Year | Award | Category | Project | Result |
|---|---|---|---|---|
| 2021 | 40th Istanbul International Film Festival | Best Actress | Sardunya | Won |

== Sardunya and İlayda Elif Elhih ==
The director of the film, Çağıl Bocut, attended classes of the conservatory in the search for the character Defne, where he made observations and met İlayda Elhih. Afterwards, İlayda gave an audition at Bocut's request and was included in the Sardunya movie in 2016 with the character of Defne.

Elhih did not have a driver's license before the Sardunya film and she got a driver's license for the film.

Elhih contributed to the script of Sardunya. Cagil Bocut mentioned that father-son and father-daughter dynamics are different from each other and that for Defne, the protagonist of the movie who is close in age to Ilayda, he consulted Ilayda a lot.
