= Miracle in Cell No. 7 (2019 Turkish film) =

2019 Turkish drama film

- Directed by: Mehmet Ada Öztekin
- Screenplay by: Özge Efendioğlu; Kubilay Tat
- Based on: Miracle in Cell No. 7 (2013) by Lee Hwan-kyung
- Produced by: Sinan Turan; Saner Ayar
- Starring: Aras Bulut İynemli; Nisa Aksongur; Deniz Baysal; İlker Aksum
- Music by: Hasan Özsüt; Işıl Özsüt
- Production companies: Motion Content Group; Lanistar Medya
- Distributed by: CJ Entertainment Turkey
- Release date: October 11, 2019
- Running time: 132 minutes
- Country: Turkey
- Language: Turkish

Miracle in Cell No. 7 (Turkish: 7. Koğuştaki Mucize) is a 2019 Turkish drama film directed by Mehmet Ada Öztekin. It is an official adaptation of the 2013 South Korean comedy-drama film Miracle in Cell No. 7 using the same premise, but with significant changes in story, characters, and tone. It was selected as the Turkish entry for the Best International Feature Film at the 93rd Academy Awards, but it was not nominated.

== Plot ==
In 2004, Ova, an upcoming bride, becomes emotional as news comes out that capital punishment in Turkey has been abolished. The story then moves to a flashback to a village in 1983. A mentally impaired father, Mehmet "Memo" Koyuncu, lives with his young daughter, Ova, and his mother Fatma on a hillside. On a visit to town, he figures in a slight altercation with the daughter of a local military officer over a bag that Ova also wants. Later, while wandering in the hills, Memo meets the officer's daughter, who offers the bag if he could catch her. However, the girl accidentally dies after falling off a cliff, and Memo's attempts to save her are misunderstood to be an act of murder and he is sent to prison but not before he tells Ova that he saw a witness to what really happened.

In prison, he is speedily convicted of murder and sentenced to death, and is beaten up by fellow inmates who are unaware of the true circumstances of his case. Despite this, Memo saves Askorozlu, the leader of his cell from being killed by another inmate and befriends the rest of his cellmates. Sometime afterwards, Ova is sneaked out of their house by Askorozlu’s accomplices and leaves a note to her grandmother stating her intent to go to her father, which leads to Fatma dying of a heart attack upon reading it. Ova is smuggled into the prison by Askorozlu's accomplices and is reunited with her father. She also befriends the inmates and after she is discovered, the wardens, such that they fully realize that Memo is innocent.

Ova tells Memo and his cellmates that she found a deserter who witnessed Memo's alleged crime, who confirms that it was an accident and that Memo was innocent. Upon hearing this, the inmates then ask the Chief Warden, Nail, and his aide, Faruk, to investigate. They find the deserter, only for him to be killed by the dead girl's father to ensure Memo is executed.

After the execution, Nail and Faruk arrive at Ova's home and reunites Memo with her. Nail reveals that one of the cellmates volunteered to secretly take Memo's place in the gallows to ensure Memo escapes from jail and that Askorozlu arranged for his accomplices on the outside to delay the officer's arrival to ensure he does not realize the deception, while Nail and Faruk arranged for the leaders of other prison gangs to stage a riot to distract the other guards while Memo escapes. Nail and Faruk assist Memo and Ova in fleeing the country on a boat to seek asylum in Greece.

== Cast ==
- Aras Bulut İynemli: Memo
- Nisa Aksongur: Ova
  - Hayal Köseoğlu: Ova (as an adult)
- Celile Toyon: Fatma Nene
- İlker Aksum: Askorozlu
- Mesut Akusta: Yusuf
- Deniz Baysal: Mine
- Yurdaer Okur: Aydın
- Yıldıray Şahinler: Hafız
- Sarp Akkaya: Nail
- Deniz Celiloğlu: Faruk
- Ferit Kaya: Ali
- Serhan Onat: Selim
- Emre Yetim: Ayna
- Gülçin Kültür Şahin: Hatice
- Cankat Aydos: Fugitive Soldier
- Doğukan Polat: Tevfik

== Reception ==
The film was the most watched film in Turkish theaters in 2019, with more than 5.3 million admissions. It also gained a large worldwide audience due to its release on Netflix, especially in France and Latin America, where it topped the charts.

== See also ==
- List of submissions to the 93rd Academy Awards for Best International Feature Film
- List of Turkish submissions for the Academy Award for Best International Feature Film
