= The Announcement (film) =

2018 film

- Directed by: Mahmut Fazil Coşkun
- Screenplay by: Mahmut Fazil Coşkun; Ercan Kesal
- Starring: Ali Seçkiner Alıcı
- Cinematography: Krum Rodriguez
- Edited by: Cicek Kahraman
- Music by: Okan Kaya
- Release date: 2018
- Language: Turkish

The Announcement (Turkish: Anons, Bulgarian: Анонс) is a 2018 comedy-drama film co-written and directed by Mahmut Fazil Coşkun.

A co-production between Turkey and Bulgaria, it premiered at the 75th Venice International Film Festival, in which it was awarded the Orizzonti Special Jury Prize.

== Cast ==
- Ali Seçkiner Alıcı as Colonel Reha
- Tarhan Karagöz as Lt. Şinasi
- Murat Kılıç as Major Kemal
- Şencan Güleryüz as Major Rıfat
- Serkan Ercan as Senator Bey
- Erdem Şenocak as Murat
- Mehmet Yılmaz Ak as Conductor Behçet

== Production ==
The film was produced by Filmotto Production, with Chouchkov Brothers and BKM serving as co-producers.

== Release ==
The film premiered at the 75th edition of the Venice Film Festival, in the Orizzonti sidebar, in which it won the Special Jury Prize.

== Reception ==
Lee Marshall from Screen International described the film as "a trenchant comment on Turkey’s current political scene [...] as much a parable of this complicated nation’s resilience".

The Hollywood Reporter film critic Boyd van Hoeij wrote: "Playing like an unholy mix of bone-dry comedy and a deadly serious meditation on the transience of those in power, this is a precision-tooled little gem that might nonetheless be a tough sell even for arthouse audiences".

The film won the International Critics’ Award at the 37th Fajr International Film Festival. It was awarded the Golden Palm, the Best Cinematography Award and the Best Screenplay Award at the 34th Mostra de València.
