= Caner Cindoruk =

Turkish actor (born 1980)

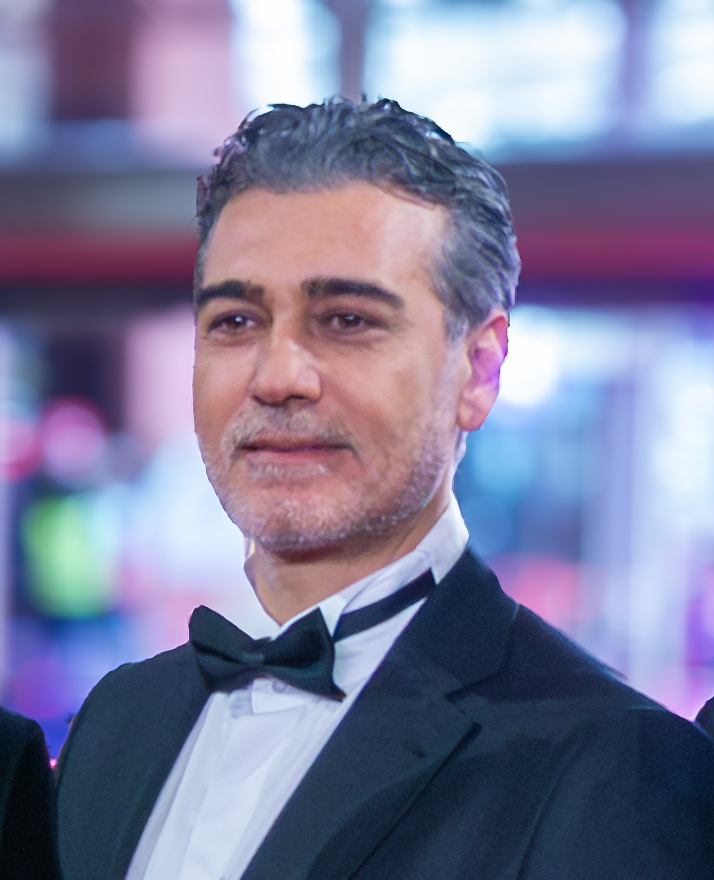
- Cindoruk in 2026
- Born: 17 April 1980 (age 46); Adana, Turkey
- Education: Çukurova University
- Occupation: Actor
- Years active: 2006–present

Caner Cindoruk (born 17 April 1980) is a Turkish actor and theatre director. He is best known series for television series Hanımın Çiftliği, The Unfaithful, Kadın and family comedy drama series Aramızda Kalsın.

== Life and career ==
Caner Cindoruk was born on 17 April 1980 in Adana. His maternal family is of Yörük and paternal family is of Kurdish origin. His mother is Müşerref, and his father is the story writer Zafer Doruk, a two times recipient of Orhan Kemal Story Award. He has two siblings, Münir Can Cindoruk and Taner Cindoruk, and first became interested in theater under the influence of his family. His uncle, Erdal Cindoruk, is a theater actor. Cindoruk's childhood years were spent in the backstage of theaters. During his secondary and high school years, he always found a piece on the stage, and took part in various plays during his university years. He is a graduate of Çukurova University, Department of Business Administration. His first professional role was the character of Yusuf on the play Fehim Paşa Konağı. In 1997, he made his professional debut at the Adana Seyhan Municipality Theater Group. He worked as an actor at the Seyhan Municipality and Adana City Theater for ten years. In 2006, he moved to Istanbul with four of his childhood friends. In 2012, together with Ebru Özkan, he appeared in the play Pandaların Hikayesi. Caner Cindoruk portrayed the character of Tulumbacı Eğrikapılı Ali in the musical İstanbulname, produced by Türker İnanoğlu. He shared the leading role with Nükhet Duru, Pelin Akil, Cezmi Baskın and Kayhan Yıldızoğlu.

=== Television career ===
In 2007, with his role on Kara Güneş he had his first television experience.

He starred in Yaprak Dökümü, which is based on a classic novel. His portrayal of the character Doctor Nazmi in Yaprak Dökümü earned him critical acclaim.

In the summer of 2009, Cindoruk was cast in an adaptation of one of Orhan Kemal's classic works, titled Hanımın Çiftliği, and acted opposite Mehmet Aslantuğ and Özgü Namal.

In 2016, Cindoruk and Gizem Karaca were cast as the leading roles of the series İstanbul Sokakları.

With Özge Özpirinçci, he played together in series "Kadın" and "Aramızda Kalsın".

He played the character of Volkan Arslan in the TV series The Unfaithful, the Turkish adaptation of the English-made Doctor Foster series broadcast on Kanal D, in which he shared the lead role with Cansu Dere and Melis Sezen from 2020 to 2022.

=== Film career ===
He had his cinematic debut in the same year with a role in the movie Beynelmilel. His cast-mates included the actor Özgü Namal. In 2008, Cindoruk appeared in the movie Kelebek. The next year he appeared in the film Geç Gelen Bahar. He was cast in Bahman Ghobadi's Gergedan Mevsimi alongside Yılmaz Erdoğan, Beren Saat and Monica Bellucci. In 2015, he appeared in Iraqi director Hiner Saleem's movie, Dar Elbise, alongside Tuba Büyüküstün, Hazar Ergüçlü, İnanç Konukçu, Devrim Yakut and Canan Ergüder. The movie was released in 2016. With his role in Zeki Demirkubuz's movie Kor, Caner Cindoruk received critical acclaim from critics. His cast-mates in the movie were Aslıhan Gürbüz and Taner Birsel.

== Filmography ==
Cinema
Year	Title	Role
2006	Beynelmilel	
2008	Geç Gelen Bahar	Ali
2008	Kelebek	Yusuf
2012	Elveda Katya	Veli
2012	Gergedan Mevsimi	
2012	Yabancı	Ferhat
2014	Çalsın Sazlar	Mahir
2016	Kor	Cemal
2016	Dar Elbise	Apo
2016	Ekşi Elmalar	Samet
2018	İçerdekiler	Teacher
2026	Salvation	Mesut
Television series
Year	Title	Role
2007	Kara Güneş	Alişir
2008	Yaprak Dökümü	Doctor Nazmi
2009-2012	Hanımın Çiftliği	Kemal
2011	Firar	Nadir
2013	Ateş Altında Aşk	
2013	Aramızda Kalsın	Civan
2016	İstanbul Sokakları	Fırat
2016–2017	Muhteşem Yüzyıl: Kösem	Silahtar Mustafa Pasha
2017	Kalk Gidelim	
2017–2019	Kadın	Sarp / Alp
2020	Zemheri	Ertan
2020–2022	The Unfaithful	Volkan Arslan
2023	Maviye Sürgün	Ali
2024	Yan Oda	Fikret Alabey
2025	Ben Onun Annesiyim	Kemal
2026-	Hamal -	Egemen
Theater (as actor)
Year	Title	Role
1998	Fehim Paşa Konağı	
1999	Kuğular Şarkı Söylemez	
2000	Ada	
2001	Yalancı Aranıyor	
2002	Soyut Padişah	
2002	Kaktüs Kumpanya	
2004	Yeşil Papağan Limited	
2005	Suçlular Çağı Suçsuzlar Çağı	
2006	Komşu Köyün Delisi	
2006	Hayvan Çiftliği	
2010	Uçurtmanın Kuyruğu	
2011	Titanik Orkestrası	
2012	Pandaların Hikâyesi	
2016	Köpek, Kadın, Erkek	
Theater (as director)
Year	Title	Role
1999	Kuğular Şarkı Söylemez	
2000	Ada	
2005	Suçlular Çağı Suçsuzlar Çağı	
2006	Hayvan Çiftliği	
Musicals
Year	Title	Role
2016	İstanbulname	
