= Erkan Petekkaya =

Turkish actor

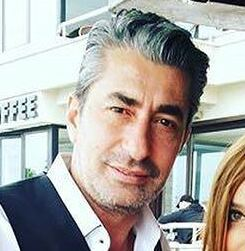
- Petekkaya in 2017
- Born: 11 December 1970 (age 55); Elazığ, Turkey
- Education: Anadolu University State Conservatory
- Occupation: Actor
- Years active: 1990–present
- Spouse: Didem Petekkaya (m. 2003)
- Children: 1
- Website: erkanpetekkaya.com.tr

Erkan Petekkaya (Turkish pronunciation: [Erkan petekkaya]; born 11 December 1970) is a Turkish actor. He has starred in several television drama series including Beyaz Gelincik ("White Poppies") (2005–07), Sessiz Fırtına ("Silent Storm") (2007–08) Öyle Bir Geçer Zaman ki ("As Time Goes By") (2010–12), Dila Hanım ("Lady Dila") (2012–14), and Paramparça ("Broken Pieces") (2014–17).

== Life and Career ==
=== Early life ===
Erkan Petekkaya was born on 11 December 1971 in Elazığ, Turkey.. Originally from Diyarbakır, he spent his childhood in the Anatolian side of Istanbul.

=== Career ===
Erkan Petekkaya began his television career in 1994, initially appearing in camera-prank segments. He made his acting debut on television in 1998 with Güzel Günler (Beautiful Days), followed by a role in Aynalı Tahir (The Mirrored Tahir) in 1999.

Over the years, Petekkaya established himself as a versatile actor, taking on roles across both drama and comedy. In 2003, he played Bülent in the comedy series Serseri, followed by appearances in productions such as Aşkına Eşkıya, Bedel, Japon Gelin, and Taştan Kalp.

One of his breakthrough performances came as Ömer Aslanbaş in Beyaz Gelincik (White Poppies). From 2005 to 2007, he portrayed Ömer, the eldest son of a wealthy family from Adana. His performance earned critical recognition and a nomination for Best Male Actor at the 2005 Beyaz İnci Television Awards.

In 2007, Petekkaya starred as Yiğit Sancaktar in Sessiz Fırtına (Silent Storm), which attracted a strong audience following. He later appeared in numerous successful television productions, including Sonbahar, Dila Hanım, Öyle Bir Geçer Zaman ki (As Time Goes By), and Paramparça (Broken Pieces). His portrayal of Cihan Gürpınar in Paramparça became particularly popular and further strengthened his reputation as one of Turkey’s prominent television actors.

In 2017 with the help of Fox TV, Petekkaya signed a contract with "Karga Seven Pictures", a production company affiliated with Red Arrow. He remained in Los Angeles in order to learn the culture of Hollywood.

After a short break from television, Petekkaya returned in 2019 with Vurgun, followed by Gel Dese Aşk in 2020. In 2021, he portrayed Delikanlı Sadi in Kırmızı Oda (Red Room), a performance that received considerable praise. Later that year, he appeared as Ömer Duran in Sana Söz (I Give You My Word).

Petekkaya also continued to take on significant roles in later productions, including Kadir in O Kız (That Girl), where he portrayed a complex character dealing with difficult circumstances.

In addition to television, Petekkaya has maintained a presence in theater, appearing in productions such as Deli Dumrul, Düdükçülerle Fırçacıların Savaşı, and Kanlı Düğün, further demonstrating his range as a performer.

== Awards ==
on 10 December 2017 at the 44th Pantene Golden Butterfly Awards, Erkan Petekkaya received the Miracle Makers award in a ceremony held at Istanbul’s Zorlu Center PSM, awarding the best in Turkey’s television and music world. The award is made for Turkish actors and actresses who have taken part in TV shows that have contributed to the international promotion of the country.

== Filmography ==
Cinema
Year	Title	Role	Notes
2009	Gecenin Kanatları	Cemal	
2015	Yeni Dünya		
2016	Kolpaçino 3. Devre	Başkan	
2017	Ayla: The Daughter of War	İskenderun Binbaşı	
2019	Kapan	Süleyman	
2021	15/07 Şafak Vakti	Cevdet	
2022	Dokunma Hurdacının Kızı	District governor	
2023	Prestij Meselesi	Gani	
2023	Aşk Filmi	Nejat	
Television
Year	Title	Role	Notes
1998	Güzel Günler	Talat	
1998	Aynalı Tahir	Kadir	
2001	Aşkına Eşkiya	Sadocan	
2003	Bedel		
2003	Taştan Kalp	İsmail	Television film
2003	Japonyalı Gelin	Ömer	Television film
2003	Serseri	Bülent	
2005	Beyaz Gelincik	Ömer Aslanbaş	
2005	Köpek	Yılmaz	
2007	Sessiz Fırtına	Yiğit Sancaktar	
2008	Sonbahar	Galip Türker	
2009	Bahar Dalları	Balıkçı	
2009	Hanımın Çiftliği	Milletvekili	
2010	Hanimeli Sokağı	Osman	Supporting role
2010–2012	Öyle Bir Geçer Zaman ki	Ali Akarsu	Leading role
2012–2014	Dila Hanım	Rıza Selamoğlu	Leading role
2013	Benim Hala Umudum Var	Erkan	Leading role
2014–2017	Paramparça	Cihan Gürpınar	Leading role
2017	Kayıt Dışı	Ali Kemal Ateş	Leading role
2019	Vurgun	Kemal Vardar	Leading role
2020	Gel Dese Aşk	Murat Düdenli	Leading role
2021–2022	Kırmızı Oda	Sadi	Guest role
2021	Doğduğun Ev Kaderindir	Sadi	Guest role
2021	Sana Söz	Ömer Duran	Leading role
2022–2023	O Kız	Kadir	Leading role
Theatre
Year	Title	Writer	Venue
1993	Mitos Güzeli	Coşkun Irmak	Diyarbakır State Theatre
1993	Sokak Kedisi Marilu	Yeşim Dorman	Diyarbakır State Theatre
1994	Korku	Orhan Asena	Diyarbakır State Theatre
1996	Blood Wedding	Federico García Lorca	Diyarbakır State Theatre
1997	Düdükçülerle Fırçacıların Savaşı	Aziz Nesin	Diyarbakır State Theatre
2001	Deli Dumrul	Güngör Dilmen	Diyarbakır State Theatre
