= Ayça Bingöl =

Turkish actress

- Born: Istanbul, Turkey
- Occupation: Actress
- Years active: 1996–present
- Spouse: Ali Gökmen Altuğ (m. 2001)
- Children: 2

Ayça Bingöl is a Turkish actress. She graduated from the Theatre Department at the Istanbul University State Conservatory in 1998.

== Career ==
Bingöl graduated from Istanbul University State Conservatory in 1998 with a degree in theatre studies. In 1996, she began working at Dormen Theatre as a professional actress, and between 1998 and 2000 she made guest appearances on the stage of Tiyatro Fora. Bingöl continued her career by taking part in commercials, TV series, as well as voice acting. She later joined the theatre organization Yeditepe Oyuncuları. Between 2007 and 2008, she had a part in the play Bana Bir Picasso Gerek, shown at Duru Theatre. During 2008–2009, she performed on stage as a cast member for the play Nehrin Solgun Yüzü. Her performance in the TV series Öyle Bir Geçer Zaman ki earned her a Golden Butterfly Award for Best Actress in 2011. In 2014, she had a leading role in the movie Benim Dünyam.

== Filmography ==
Film
| Year | Title | Role | Notes |
|---|---|---|---|
| 2006 | Tramvay | Seval | |
| 2009 | Sonsuz | Aylin | |
| 2009 | Melekler ve Kumarbazlar | | |
| 2011 | Ay Büyürken Uyuyamam | Melek | |
| 2013 | Benim Dünyam | Handan Bayındır | |
| 2018 | Müslüm | Emine | |
| 2022 | Cici | Saliha | Netflix original film |
| 2024 | Fidan | Nesrin | |
Television
| Year | Title | Role | Notes |
| 1999 | Sır Dosyası | Alev | |
| 2000 | Evdeki Yabancı | İpek Erez | |
| 2001 | Çiçek Taksi | Canan | Episode 96 |
| 2002 | Anne Babamla Evlensene | | |
| 2004 | Yadigar | Sedef | |
| 2006 | Taşların Sırrı | Gülergül | |
| 2007 | Hayat Kavgam | | |
| 2007 | Bıçak Sırtı | | |
| 2008 | İki Aile | Füsun | |
| 2009 | Küçük Kadınlar | | |
| 2009 | Samanyolu | Evsed | |
| 2010–2013 | Öyle Bir Geçer Zaman ki | Cemile | Leading role |
| 2014 | Benim Adım Gültepe | Gülümser | |
| 2016 | Babam ve Ailesi | Nilgün İpekçi | |
| 2019 | Kardeş Çocukları | Ümran Çetin | |
| 2021 | Kırmızı Oda | Derya Çaldıran | |
| 2022 | Yürek Çıkmazı | Cennet Tekin | |
| 2023-2024 | Kirli Sepeti | Songül | Leading role |
| 2025 | Piyasa | Ahsen Çevik | Supporting role |
| 2026 | Kıskanmak | Nur Kızılbağ | |
| 2026– | Aşk ve Taht | Ümmühan Hatun | |
Video games
| Year | Title | Role | Notes |
| 1997 | Byzantine: The Betrayal | Sharife Gelecek | |
| 2011 | Crysis 2 | Tara Strickland | Voice |

== Awards ==
| Year | Award | Category | Work | Result |
|---|---|---|---|---|
| 2008 | 13th Sadri Alışık Awards | Best Stage Actress of the Year | Bana Bir Picasso Gerek | Won |
| 2008 | 12th Afife Theatre Awards | Most Successful Actress of the Year | Bana Bir Picasso Gerek | Won |
| 2008 | 6th Tiyatro Theatre Awards | Actress of the Year | Bana Bir Picasso Gerek | Won |
| 2009 | 16th Çırağan Lions Awards | Best Actress of the Year | Nehrin Solgun Yüzü | Won |
| 2011 | 38th Golden Butterfly Awards | Best Actress in a Drama Series | Öyle Bir Geçer Zaman ki | Won |
| 2011 | 2011 Antalya Television Awards | Best Actress in a Drama Series | Öyle Bir Geçer Zaman ki | Won |
| 2012 | 2012 Antalya Television Awards | Best Actress in a Drama Series | Öyle Bir Geçer Zaman ki | Won |
| 2013 | 1st Yeni Tiyatro Magazine Labor and Success Awards | Best Actress in a Supporting Role | Çehov Makinesi | Won |
| 2016 | 16th Direct Pole Audience Awards | Best Actress | Hansel ve Gretel'in Öteki Hikâyesi | Won |
| 2019 | 2nd İzmir International Film Festival | Best Supporting Actress | Müslüm | Won |
