= Öyle Bir Geçer Zaman ki =

Turkish telenovela

- Also known as: As Time Goes By
- Written by: Coşkun Irmak
- Directed by: Zeynep Günay Tan
- Starring: Erkan Petekkaya; Ayça Bingöl; Wilma Elles; Yıldız Çağrı Atiksoy; Farah Zeynep Abdullah; Aras Bulut İynemli; Meral Çetinkaya; Emir Berke Zincidi
- Country of origin: Turkey
- Original language: Turkish
- No. of seasons: 3
- No. of episodes: 120

Production
- Producer: D Productions
- Running time: ~100 minutes

Original release
- Network: Kanal D
- Release: September 14, 2010 – June 18, 2013

Öyle Bir Geçer Zaman ki (English: As Time Goes By) is a Turkish drama television series based on the life and personal experiences of the series' creator and screenwriter, Coşkun Irmak, and directed by Zeynep Günay Tan that broadcast on Kanal D for three seasons from 2010 to 2013. Set in 1960s Istanbul, it is a melodrama revolving around the Akarsu family whose patriarch, ship captain Ali (played by Erkan Petekkaya), who is married to Cemile (played by Ayça Bingöl), starts an affair with a foreign woman (played by Wilma Elles). As Time Goes By was one of the most popular television series in Turkey during its run and has been dubbed in over 30 languages and broadcast worldwide.

== Plot ==
Season 1

The series is inspired by its writer's own life and is set in 1967 and revolves around the Akarsu family. Ali Akarsu is the patriarch of the family and works as a seaman and the captain of a ship. He is married to Cemile and they have 4 children: Berrin, a law student at Istanbul University, Aylin and Mete, who are high school students, and 5-year-old Osman. When Ali goes on one of his many trips, he begins an affair with a Dutch woman named Caroline and that leads to the disintegration of the Akarsu family. When Caroline comes to Turkey uninvited, Cemile wounds her by stabbing and goes to jail. Caroline is hospitalized and from her hospital bed she sets her terms: Ali must get a divorce from Cemile in order for Caroline to drop charges against Cemile and release her from jail. Caroline moves in with Ali. Without any money to sustain themselves, Cemile and her children get evicted from their house. Ali lets Cemile and the children live in the unfinished house in Zeytinli, while setting obstacles for Cemile for finding a job. However Ali's mother, Hasefe, gives her total support to Cemile and helps her on daily basis.

Mete, the oldest son, sets the house on fire and Ali refuses to pay alimony to Cemile with the excuse of house restoration. Mete gets jailed for arson and beaten in jail. Ali demands the youngest son, Osman, to live with him and Caroline, in order to drop the charges against Mete and set him free. Osman gets abused by Caroline, and almost drowns in the sea while Ali was procrastinating. Fortunately, Ali's acquaintance "The Fisherman" sees the child in the water and rescues Osman. Osman returns to live with his mother because of Ali's inability to take care of the boy. There, the family friendship with "The Fisherman" blossoms. He falls in love with Cemile and asks her to marry him. Ali gets crazily jealous and promises to kill him if he doesn't back off.

Meanwhile, Aylin, the middle daughter is desperate from living in poverty. She agrees to marry Murat, the youngest brother of the man that she loves, Soner Talaşoğlu. She also signs a prenuptial agreement, where the term is that she will become rich only after Murat's death, who is ill with an incurable disease. This unables him to walk and to keep his marital duties in bed. In the meantime Berrin, the oldest daughter, falls in love with Ahmet, a member of student Marxist movement. Another student, Hakan, son of a wealthy right wing man, is desperately in love with her. Ahmet's mother gets accidentally shot by the bullet which was supposed to kill Ahmet by the assassin hired by Ekram, father of Hakan. Hakan picks the gun and Ahmet starts looking for the revenge, believing that Hakan killed his mother. When truth revealed, Ahmet kills the assassin and wounds Ekram. People of Ekram start the hunting. Berrin hides Ahmet but the police find him and arrest him. Hakan helps him to flee abroad, however at a price, Berrin must marry him.

Mete falls in love with his music teacher Inci, who helped him many times, she encourages him to play guitar. He and his band take part in musical competition and become winners. They produce an album which becomes successful. Inci marries her fiancée but regrets it because her husband is not a good person. She gets seriously ill with cancer, and dies with Mete on her side. Meanwhile, Ali and Caroline get married. Caroline's old partner, a thief named Ekber, appears in Turkey and together they set up fraud to strip Ali's bank account. One thing leads to another, Ali loses everything but his pension and the house. Cemile doesn't want to marry the Fisherman because she learns the story of his life. His name is Hikmet Karci and he is a rich manufacturer, who left his wealthy lifestyle due to a family tragedy. Cemile also discovers that his ex-wife is in fragile state of mind, and she doesn't want to harm this woman, named Selma, by marrying Fisherman. Ali, still being jealous and broke, crashes the restaurant boat which Caroline sold to get revenge on him. The police are looking for Ali. A few days later he rapes Cemile.

Soon, Ali with remorse, asks Cemile to kill him. The police appear and arrest Ali for crashing the boat. Cemile suffers silently until the symptoms of pregnancy appear. Soner pays out Ali from the Jail. Ali begs Cemile to keep the baby. She has internal bleeding and gets hospitalised with all the family by her side and Ali giving her blood. There everybody learns that Cemile is pregnant and Ali is the father. Caroline is also pregnant and announces that to Ali. Ali now tells Cemile to abort the baby. Cemile aborts the baby and then she agrees to marry the Fisherman. Selma and Cemile become friends, Selma's mental condition becomes normal after spending time with little Osman. On the wedding evening, Cemile and Hikmet get married. Everybody is happy, and suddenly Ali appears and shoots Hikmet dead. He is determined to kill Cemile and then commit suicide, but his mother Hasefe, shoots him with the gun that Ahmet left at the house, crippling Ali and saving Cemile's life.

Season 2

The events of Season 2 take place two years after Season 1. The youngest son of Captain Ali and Cemile, Osman, has started primary school and has fallen in love with a girl named Gülden. However, their teacher, who also happens to be Mete's teacher in high school, always seems to be punishing little Osman because of his supposed naughtiness. Captain Ali is freed from prison after "The General Clemency". However, getting out of jail means almost nothing to him, considering his new lifestyle, poor and miserable, partly due to him raping Cemile, his ex-wife, and arguing and fighting with his children and also being robbed and tricked by Caroline.

Cemile Karcı now has legacy from Hikmet Karcı. This puts an end to her and her children's struggle with money. When her partner in ownership of Harcı Triko A.Ş marries an untrustworthy and cunning man, she decides to involve herself in the management of the company. After a rather short time, the husband, named Kenan, demonstrates his true personality causing drastic changes for the company's future. Mete Akarsu, meanwhile, becomes famous thanks to his guitar playing, songwriting, and singing. From time to time he performs with his friends in a well-known casino. Although his fame increases daily, Mete cannot forget his deceased first lover: Professor Inci, his music teacher in high school. This is underlined by him still carrying around a photograph portraying him and the beautiful Prof. Inci. Yet, instead of finally letting go of her, Mete starts to date a girl who closely resembles his first love. Though he appears to be happy at first glance, Mete soon admits to himself that he's been fooling himself and lying to his heart all the time. Unfortunately, Mete keeps suffering from the loss of Inci, until he meets another girl, Nihal, which slightly reduces his pain over his first lover's death. Aylin Akarsu keeps contact with Soner even though they are not seeing each other or talking to each other.

After a while, Soner returns from London and spends time hanging out with Aylin and Murat. Aylin runs free and decides she can not continue being married to her wheelchair-user husband and desperately wants to marry the one man she truly loves: Soner, who obviously shares the same affection for her. However, Soner is severely traumatized by his despaired brother's suicide and lets down Aylin without an explanation, leaving her distraught. Berrin Akarsu, the oldest child of Captain Ali and Cemile, is now married to Hakan and together they have a baby named Zehra. Because of "The General Clemency", Ahmet, the man who has the strongest love for Berrin has permission to enter Turkey. Kenan and Ali confront on a ship. Kenan accidentally shoots at a pipe and Ali knocks him out. Ali manages to escape the ship but Kenan dies when it explodes. All is not good for Ali though and he feels guilty about his past. He commits suicide by drowning in the sea because he knew that Cemile would never forgive him. Cemile goes hysterical when she finds this out and when she knew it was too late to save Ali, she goes to the hospital to see Aylin, (now married to Sonor) where Cemile finds out that Aylin has died in childbirth.

Season 3

A couple of years have passed from last season. Ali Akarsu committed suicide at the end of Season 2 by going out to sea, so the oldest man of the family, Mete Akarsu, begins to take more and more responsibilities. He also meets Ayça. As his music band broke up, his life gets worse, but soon he find out that Ayça loves him. Ayça is somebody whom Osman loves, also. She goes in the same high school with Osman. The key of the season is the main event, the "Military Coup" that changed the destiny of Turkey. At this time Osman, the leading character, is grown up and a high-school student. Despite trying to keep away from political fights and discussions, Osman joins a socialist group. He also has public sense and thoughts. This season Osman's life is changed because of Arif (stationer of the district). Aylin dies at childbirth, leaving Soner in grief along with their daughter. Soner is depressed and decides to leave Turkey and go to London. His best friend Süleyman, and Cemile insist on him staying in Istanbul, so Soner can take care after his daughter, Deniz Yıldız Talaşoğlu.

Berrin married Ahmet and their economic situation is stable. They are living with Berrin's daughter Zehra who doesn't know that Ahmet isn't her biological father. Hakan is discharged from prison after he was accused of shooting his father. He is depressed and feels lonely and he starts to sneak peeks at his daughter. Ekram, Hakan's father, kidnaps Zehra after school and he tells her the bitter truth. Zehra is shocked to learn that Hakan is her biological father and she gets mad at Berrin for not telling her and decides to live with her biological father. Hakan is thrilled and is no longer lonesome. Soon however, Zehra is diagnosed with kidney failure. The doctor tells to her family that she needs dialysis every single day until the kidney transplant is performed. Ekram takes Zehra to his house and decides to keep her there until she recovers despite the disapproval of her mother. So Hakan decides to go live with his father and Caroline, the wife of Ekram and Captain Ali's ex-mistress. Then Caroline gets tested to see, if she could donate for Zehra and the result is positive. However, she promises to give her kidney if Hakan marries her because of how wealthy he is. At first Hakan doesn't like this but then wants to show what Caroline is actually like. Hakan starts convincing Caroline and starts to go on dates with her. After finally getting plans to get married, Hakan tells Caroline to come to a hotel in İzmir, but also inviting someone else: his father, Ekram. Ekram sees this and gets very sick. Finally, Bahar (babysitter of Deniz) becomes donor for Zehra, enraging Caroline.

Meanwhile, Arif's enemy, Tugrul comes to the show. He is said to be the brother of whom Arif killed back in his socialist days. He gets revenge by killing Arif's daughter and kidnapping Mete and Arif himself. He takes them to an abandoned mansion where many prisoners are beat to death. Tugrul uses this opportunity to try to get Cemile to be his wife and tell her that Arif is supposedly dead. Cemile agrees with this, not knowing the truth, but she first makes a deal, give Mete back to her. Tugrul agrees but still tortures Mete. Soon Turgul is killed. Ekram orders to have Ahmet assassinated which happens successfully. Berrin was pregnant from him. Mete and Ayça start dating again. Hakan and Berrin start dating again, Berrin gives birth to her second child who is a boy. Sonor marries Bahar in the last scene. They are waiting for their child to be born. After many years Osman wrote story about his family and TV started shooting of TV series.

== Cast ==
Actors/Actresses	Main characters		
Actors/Actresses	Season 1	Season 2	Season 3
Erkan Petekkaya	Ali Akarsu	Ali Akarsu	
Ayça Bingöl	Cemile Akarsu	Cemile Karcı	Cemile Yücel
Wilma Elles	Caroline Akarsu	Caroline Akarsu	Caroline Akarsu
Muhammet Uzuner			Arif Yücel
Emir Berke Zincidi	Osman Akarsu	Osman Akarsu	
Gün Koper			Osman Akarsu
Yıldız Çağrı Atiksoy	Berrin Akarsu	Berrin Tatlıoğlu	Berrin Taşer
Aras Bulut İynemli	Mete Akarsu	Mete Akarsu	Mete Akarsu
Farah Zeynep Abdullah	Aylin Akarsu	Aylin Talaşoğlu	
Meral Çetinkaya	Hasefe Akarsu	Hasefe Akarsu	Hasefe Akarsu
Mete Horozoğlu	Soner Talaşoğlu	Soner Talaşoğlu	Soner Talaşoğlu
Recep Renan Bilek	Süleyman Demir	Süleyman Demir	Süleyman Demir
Salih Bademci	Hakan Tatlıoğlu	Hakan Tatlıoğlu	Hakan Tatlıoğlu
Tolga Güleç	Ahmet Taşer	Ahmet Taşer	Ahmet Taşer
Mine Tugay			Bahar

Actors/Actresses	Supporting Characters		
Actors/Actresses	Season 1	Season 2	Season 3
Mehmet Gürhan	Kemal Akarsu	Kemal Akarsu	Kemal Akarsu
Zeyno Eracar	Neriman Akarsu	Neriman Akarsu	Neriman Akarsu
Yağız Can Konyalı			Aydın Uluç
Arif Pişkin			Halit Uluç
Nilperi Şahinkaya	Mesude Akarsu	Mesude Akarsu	Mesude Akarsu
Dila Akbaş	Ayten	Ayten	
Sercan Badur	Necati Muzdarip	Necati Muzdarip	
Simay Küçük	Meral Taşer		
Yeliz Kuvancı	İnci Günay		
Orhan Alkaya	Hikmet Karcı (Balıkçı)		
Ferit Kaya	Resul (Kürşat)	Resul (Kürşat)	
Şenay Aydın	Amina Taşer		
Ahmet Arıman	Bakkal	Bakkal	Bakkal
Suat Ergin	Manav	Manav	Manav
Ebru Helvacıoğlu			Betül
Enes Atış			Mithat Pale
Vahdet Çakar			Komiser
Onur Özaydın			Cengiz
Serhat Özcan			Tuğrul Yücel
Nisa Melis Telli			Deniz Talaşoğlu
Ece Çeşmioğlu			Ayça

== Production ==
As Time Goes By was a big production, with as much as $1.3 million spent to produce just the first two weeks of the show.

== Music ==
One of the main soundtracks in the series is Cockeye's Song which was composed for the 1984 epic Once Upon a Time in America, with Kanal D studios paying royalties in order to use it in Öyle Bir Geçer Zamanki. Erkin Koray's song "Öyle Bir Geçer Zaman ki" is also included in the series.

== Series overview ==
Series	Episodes	Originally released	
Series	Episodes	First released	Last released
1	38	14 September 2010	21 June 2011
2	41	6 September 2011	19 June 2012
3	41	4 September 2012	18 June 2013

== Awards and nominations ==
Year	Award	Category	Recipient	Result	Ref.
2011	Golden Butterfly Awards	Best local drama	Öyle Bir Geçer Zaman ki	Won	
2011	Golden Butterfly Awards	Best actor in drama	Erkan Petekkaya	Won	
2011	Golden Butterfly Awards	Best actress in drama	Ayça Bingöl	Won	

== International popularity ==
Öyle Bir Geçer Zamanki has been dubbed in more than 30 languages. According to Nielsen Media Research, Öyle Bir Geçer Zaman ki was the most popular TV show on Macedonian TV in 2013 in terms of viewers, followed by another Turkish show, Asi which came in second. In fact, Öyle Bir Geçer Zaman ki and other Turkish shows are so successful in Macedonia, that the government passed a bill to restrict broadcasts of Turkish series during the day and at prime time, in order to reduce the Turkish impact on Macedonian society.

As Time Goes By was the most watched foreign TV series in Serbia during 2013. It was also dubbed in Spanish as Tormenta de Pasiones: Cuando el Amor se Convierte en un Infierno and broadcast in Chile, Puerto Rico and in the United States.

== International broadcasters ==
Country	Network	Premiere	Title
Afghanistan	Tolo TV	October 2012	زمان
Albania; Kosovo	Kanal D Drama	2020–21	Koha kalon
Argentina	Telefe	July 17, 2017	Mar de Amores
Bosnia and Herzegovina	TV1; Mreža; Televizija OBN	October 2, 2011; December 8, 2015	Kako vrijeme prolazi / Ali
Bulgaria	bTV bTV Lady	July 9, 2012; March 4, 2013	Времето лети (As time goes by)
Chile	Chilevisión	January 5, 2015	Tormenta de Pasiones
Chile	Mega	July 25, 2018	Mar de Amores
Colombia	Canal 1	August 14, 2017	Tormenta de Pasiones
Colombia	Caracol TV	August 4, 2025	Tormenta de Pasiones
Croatia	Nova TV	November 5, 2012	Kako vrijeme prolazi
Dominican Republic	Antena 7	February 19, 2018	Tormenta de Pasiones
Egypt	CBC	2012	على مر الزمان
Estonia	Kanal2	September 7, 2015	Reetmine
Ethiopia	Kana TV	2020-22	ማዕበል Maebel (Storm)
Georgia	Maestro TV	October 28, 2013	დაკარგული დრო
Greece	Star Channel	September 16, 2013	Η Προδοσία (The Betrayal)
Iran	GEM TV; RUBIX; RIVER	August 2, 2014	روزی روزگاری ("Roozi Roozegari")
Iraq (Kurdistan)	Astera TV	November 15, 2013	ئازارەكانی ژیان
Kazakhstan	КТК	September 6, 2012	Бесценное время (Infinite time)
Kazakhstan	Астана	May 13, 2019	Қайран күндер
Lebanon	LBC	2013	Aala mar el zaman
Lithuania	LNK TV	February 4, 2015	Bėgantis Laikas
Montenegro	TV Vijesti	April 1, 2013	Kako vrijeme prolazi
North Macedonia	Alsat; Sitel	June 20, 2012; 2012	Ashtu siç koha kalon (Albanian); Бурни времиња (Macedonian)
Pakistan	Geo Kahani	May 13, 2013	Bewafai (The Betrayal)
Paraguay	Telefuturo	May 16, 2018	Tormenta de Pasiones
Puerto Rico	Wapa	February 29, 2016 January 8, 2018	Tormenta de Pasiones
Romania	Kanal D	August 4, 2014	Trădarea
Serbia	Prva Srpska Televizija	January 8, 2013	Kako vreme prolazi
Uruguay	Canal 10	July 16, 2018	Tormenta de Pasiones
United Arab Emirates (Arab World)	MBC4	September 1, 2012	على مرّ الزمان
United States	Telemundo	August 22, 2016	Tormenta de Pasiones
United States	Pasiones	March 5, 2018	Tormenta de Pasiones
