= Melis Sezen =

Turkish actress (born 1997)

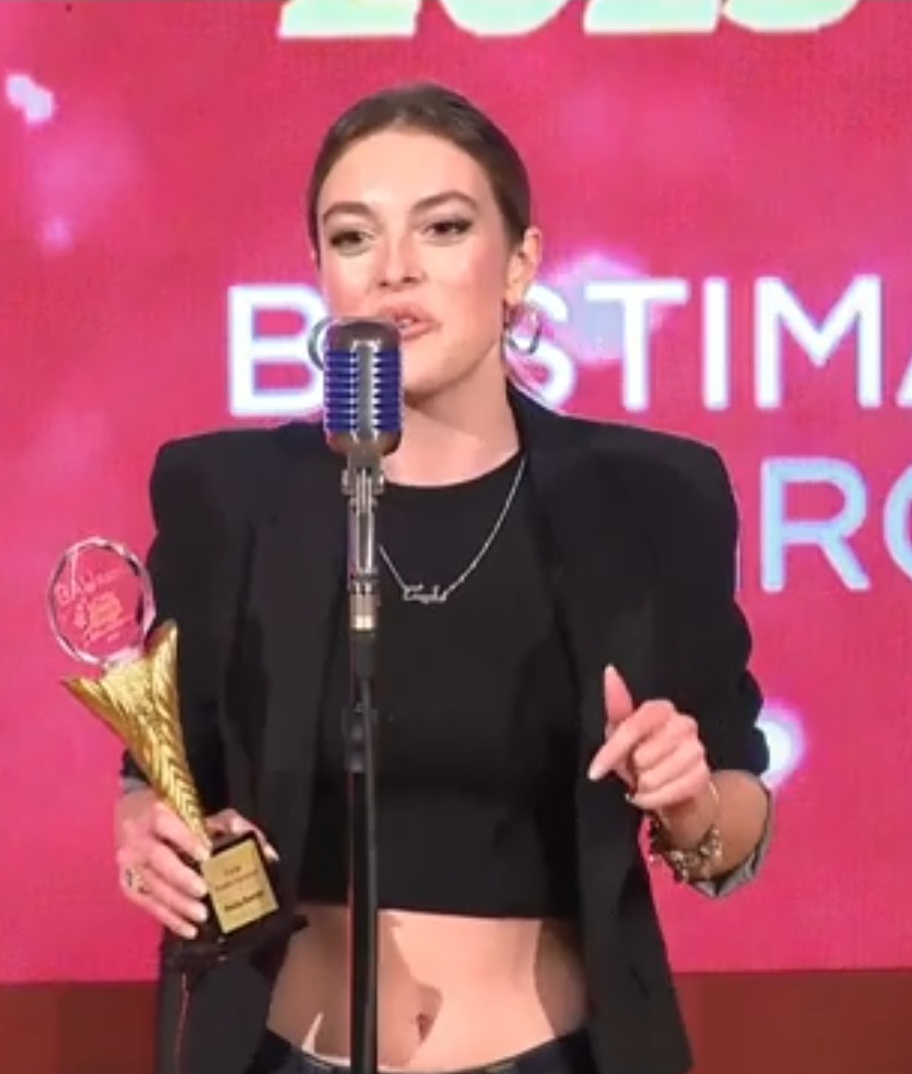
- Melis Sezen in 2024
- Born: 2 January 1997 (age 29); Istanbul, Turkey
- Education: Koç University
- Occupation: Actress
- Years active: 2016–present

Melis Sezen (born 2 January 1997) is a Turkish actress. She is best known for her roles in Tainted Love (2019), The Miracle 2: Love (2019), The Unfaithful (2020–2022), Gülcemal (2023) Genius (2024–2025), and The Gentleman (2026-)

== Life and career ==
Sezen was born on 2 January 1997 in Silivri, Istanbul, and completed her high school education at Selimpaşa Atatürk Anatolian High School. Her paternal family members are Macedonian Albanian immigrants, while her maternal family members are who immigrated from Thessaloniki, Greece. Sezen has a younger brother and her family engages in trade. In an interview, she mentioned that her family was supportive of her decision to start working as a theatre actress, and in another interview she adds that it was her mother who discovered her interest in acting and enrolled her in Müjdat Gezen Art Center. Sezen received drama education from the age of 12, and received theater education for one year in Müjdat Gezen Art Center. Then she acquired a role in the play Cümbüş-ü Hospital at Ali Solmaz Theatre in Silivri. Meanwhile, she continued her education and graduated from Koç University, Department of Media and Visual Arts. Between 2016 and 2017, she made her TV debut with a role in the series Hayat Bazen Tatlıdır.

Between 2017 and 2018, she played the role of "Ebru" in the TV series Siyah İnci. In 2018, she made her cinematic film with a number of independent films. She first starred in the movie Dünya Hali, followed by Tilki Yuvası. After these movies, she had her first serious cinematic role in Bizim İçin Şampiyon, which tells the story of racehorse Bold Pilot and jokey Halis Karataş. In 2019, she had a leading role in the TV series Leke, playing the role of "Yasemin". This was followed by another leading role in Sevgili Geçmiş, in which she portrayed the character "Deren". Also in 2019, she landed a role in the movie Mucize 2: Aşk and played the role of "Beren". In the same year, Sezen also ranked among the first 100 names on IMDb's Starmetre list.

In 2020, she played the leading character "Nazan" in the historical mini series Ya İstiklal Ya Ölüm, which covers the occupation of Constantinople, the dissolution of the Chamber of Deputies, the Kuva-yi Milliye movement led by Mustafa Kemal Atatürk and the establishment processes of a new national assembly in Ankara. She also had a role in the movie Kovala, which was initially set to be released on 17 April 2020, but following the new measures enforced as a result of the COVID-19 pandemic the premiere date was pushed to a later date. Between 2020 and 2022, she shared the leading role with Cansu Dere and Caner Cindoruk in the Kanal D series Sadakatsiz, a local adaptation of Doctor Foster.

== Filmography ==
=== Film ===
Year	Title	Original title	Role	Director	Notes	Ref(s)
2018	The Way of the Wind	Dünya Hali	Gizem	Ömer Can	Leading role	
2018	Champion	Bizim İçin Şampiyon	Esra Atman	Ahmet Katıksız	Supporting role	
2019	The Miracle 2: Love	Mucize 2: Aşk	Beren	Mahsun Kırmızıgül	Supporting role	
2021	Kovala	Kovala	Merve	Burak Kuka	Main role	
2021	Fox Nest	Tilki Yuvasi	Aylin	Umut Burçin Gülseçgin	Main role	
2024	A Republic Song	Bir Cumhuriyet Şarkısı	Mediha	Yağız Alp Akaydın	Main role	
2024	Sassy	Şımarık	Asena	Onur Ünlü	Leading role	
TBA	Masha's Mushroom	Masha's Mushroom	Alex	White Cross	Pre-production	

=== Web ===
Year	Title	Original title	Role	Platform	Notes	Ref(s)
2019	Sincere Voices Choir	İçten Sesler Korosu	Öykü	YouTube	Main role; 2 episodes	
2021	Fatma	Fatma	Hayat Kadını	Netflix	Cameo; 1 episode	
TBA	Nomen	Nomen	Duru	Disney+	Leading role	

=== Television ===
Year	Title	Original title	Role	Network	Notes	Ref(s)
2016–2017	Life Is Sweet Sometimes	Hayat Bazen Tatlidir	Asya Turan	Star TV	Main role; 26 episodes	
2017–2018	Black Pearl	Siyah İnci	Ebru	Star TV	Main role; 20 episodes	
2019	Tainted Love	Leke	Yasemin Adıvar	Kanal D	Leading role; 9 episodes	
2019	Dear Past	Sevgili Geçmis	Deren Kutlu	Star TV	Main role; 8 episodes	
2020	Either Freedom or Death	Ya İstiklal Ya Ölüm	Nazan Hanım	TRT 1	Main role; 12 episodes	
2020–2022	The Unfaithful	Sadakatsiz	Derin Güçlü	Kanal D	Main role; 40 episodes	
2022	The Masked Singer Turkey	Maske Kimsin Sen?	Herself	Fox	Reality competition; 9 episodes	
2023	Gülcemal	Gülcemal	Deva Nakkaşoğlu	Fox	Leading role; 13 episodes	
2024–2025	Genius	Deha	İmre Karan	Show TV	Main role	

== Commercials ==
Year	Brand	Role	Notes
2021–2023	Turkcell	Brand face	
2022	Derimod		
2022–present	Lexus	Brand ambassador	
2024–2025	Turkish Airlines	Brand face	
2025	Sleppy		
2026–present	Mad Parfumeur	Brand ambassador	
