= Wilma Elles =

German actress, model and fashion designer

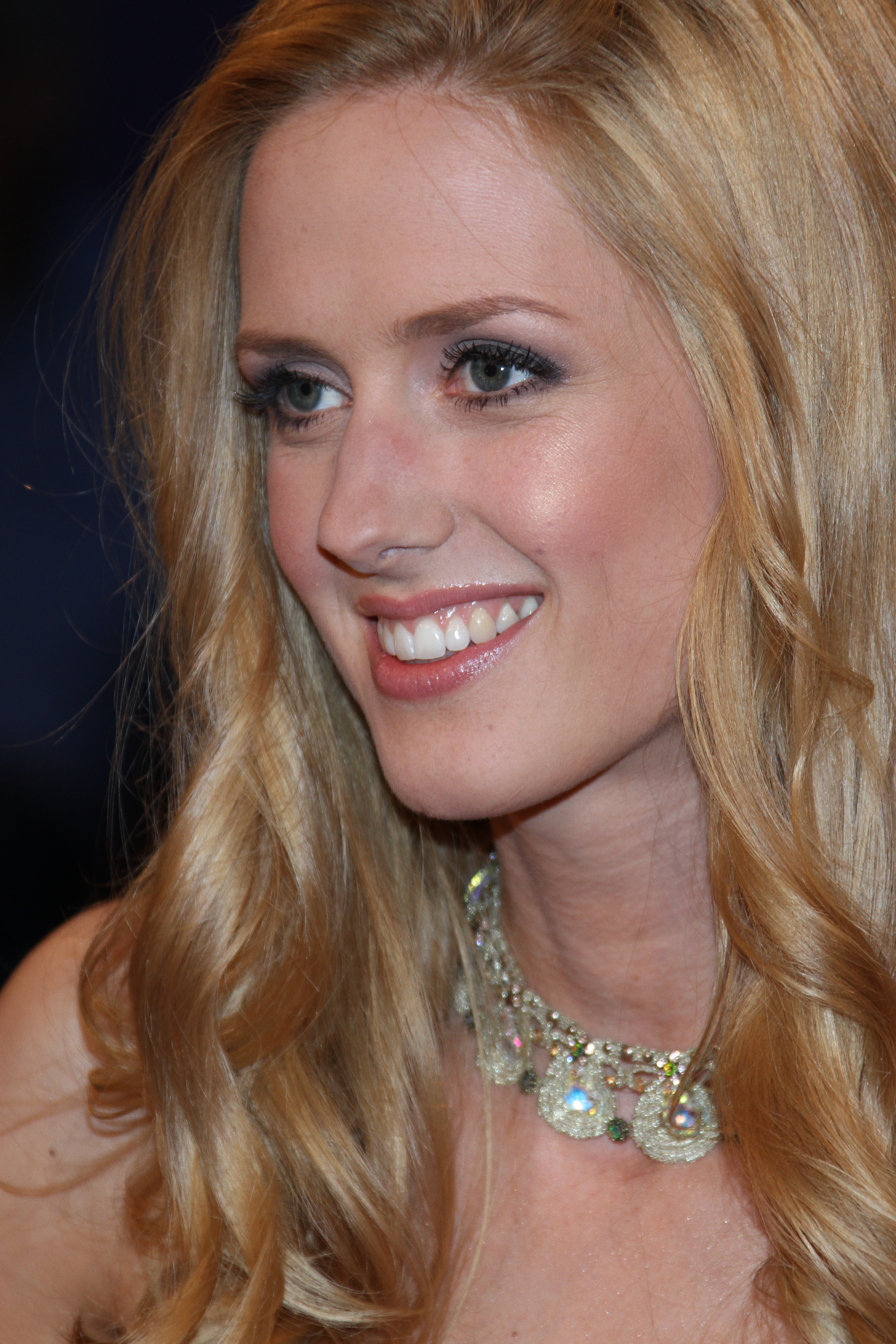
- Born: 18 October 1986 (age 39); Cologne, West Germany
- Other name: Mücella Elles
- Citizenship: Germany; Turkey
- Occupation: Actress
- Years active: 2005–present
- Spouse: Mehmet Şah Çelik (m. 2022)
- Partner(s): Kerem Göğüş (2014–2019)
- Children: 4

Wilma Elles (born 18 October 1986) is a German actress, model and fashion designer.

== Biography ==
Elles is the second of a family of five children. Her father and mother are in the engineering distribution business. She graduated from school with Abitur at the French-German bilingual Burgau-Gymnasium in Düren with a 1,8 grade. Since the age of ten, she engaged in school theatre plays, took acting, guitar and dance classes. She studied at the University of Cologne.

One of her first roles Elles played in the majeure German TV production Ship of No Return: The Final Voyage of the Gustloff of Joseph Vilsmaier. Then she got her first lead roles as Kika in the cinema movie Das Weinen davor by Gökhan Sayim, which was screened at German cinema in summer 2010, Maria in Turk Usulu of Mehmet Günes and Lilly in the production The End by Joachim Mais with Christine Kaufmann and Martin Semmelrogge. On stage she performed e.g. in the theatre Theater im Hof in Cologne.

In 2010 she got an offer for one of the lead characters, Caroline, in Turkish TV series Öyle Bir Geçer Zaman ki on Kanal D, which was over after three seasons. As she couldn't speak Turkish at the beginning of the shootings, she just memorized the phonetics of her lines for her role until she learned more Turkish. She speaks English, German (mother language) and French. The series received many awards and broke viewer records with a continuous weekly market share of 50-60% (and up to 73%), and an average of 25–30 million viewers each week in Turkey. It was screened in 70 countries including Bolivia, Colombia, Argentina, the United States, Tunisia, Chile, Afghanistan, Algeria, Azerbaijan, Bulgaria, Cyprus, Egypt, Iran, Palestine, Kazakhstan, Lebanon, Macedonia, Mali, Saudi Arabia, Serbia, the Emirates and other countries.

Elles was awarded Best Actress at the European Quality Awards 2011. She was selected the Best Femme Fatale of Turkish TV in 2012 and also she was selected as the meanest character of Turkish TV with 48.6%.

During the summer break 2011, she played an Australian woman in the cinema movie Çanakkale Çocukları from Sinan Çetin and a French character in the movie El Yazısı, the script of which was awarded a prize at the Golden Orange Film Festival and that was screened in Turkish cinema in spring 2012. Then, she gave life to the lead character of Elisabeth in the cinema movie Laz Vampir and played the lead of Olivia in the US-American-Dutch-Turkish co-production Tragedy in 2012. In 2013 again shot two cinema movies during the summer break. In Bir Gece she portrayed the lead role of Leyla and in Bu İşte Bir Yalnızlık Var she was seen in the role of Diana.She played in the movies "Eyvah Karim" and the female lead in the movie "Mendilim Kekik kokuyor", released in cinemas on 6 March 2020. In Germany she played the role of Katherina in the movie "Gegen den Wind - Die Rückkehr" which will come out in the German cinema in autumn 2020.

Furthermore, Elles does modelling and appeared with shootings in Vogue, Elle, Tempo, Miss, Grazia - magazines e.g. and has been on the cover of Elle Bulgaria, GQ Turkey, Instyle Home Turkey, Tempo and other magazines and appears on the catwalk in many fashion shows e.g. at the Istanbul and Berlin Fashion Week 2011, 2012, 2013. Also she was the front model at the Fashion week New York and Loa Angeles for the brand Artistixin 2014, 2015. And she was the front model for the designer Emre Tamer in the London Fashion week 2020.

In the summer 2012 Wilma Elles designed and brought out the worldwide first Feng-Shui Clothing line "Maya Collection" for the company Âdil Işık.

Wilma Elles told about her interest in foreign cultures. She got the Turkish citizenship next to her German citizenship in 2016. She finished at the department of political science of the Cologne University, Islamic Studies and Theatre/Movies Studies with the high degree of 1,8.

== Filmography ==
Films by title, with year, and role and company:

- Mehmed: Fetihler Sultanı, 2024, as Nadia Minotto
- Arka Sokaklar, 2019–2020, as Nadya(Nadia); Turkish TV series
- Yeter, 2015, as Idil; Turkish TV series
- Senden Bana Kalan, 2015, as Emma; Turkish movie
- Emicem Hospital, 2015; Turkish movie
- Filinta, 2014, as Anita von Wilhelm; Turkish TV series
- Gurbette Aşk, 2013, as Helga; Turkish TV series
- Öyle Bir Geçer Zaman Ki, 2010–2013, as Caroline
- Çanakkale Çocukları, 2011, as Catherine; Plato Film, Cinema-movie
- El Yazisi, 2011, as Julie; Cinema-movie
- Bir gece, 2013, as Leyla; Cinema-movie
- Bu iste bir yalnizlik var, 2013, as Diana; Cinema-movie
- Ihr mich auch (You and Me Both), 2010, as Tina Schulz; ZDF-Movie
- Fahr zur Hölle, 2010, as Lilly
- Das Ding (The Thing), 2010; Sony Pictures
- Türk Usulü, 2008, as Maria
- Ship of No Return: The Final Voyage of the Gustloff, 2008, as Lieselotte; ZDF-Movie
- Komissar Stolberg, 2007, as Petra Schnuck
- Das Weinen davor, 2007, as Kika
- Cologne P.D., 2007, as Frau Reese
- Gameshow Marathon, 2007, as Glücksfee
- Das Spielzeug, 2007, as Van
- Cauliflower Power, 2007, as Caulie, Daulie and Anne
- Heilige Konflikte (Holy Conflict), 2007, as Schwester Katharina
- Zeltgeflüster, 2007, as Fiona
- Kill or Be Killed, 2007, as Sibyll
- Speak My Language, 2006, as Natascha
- Ich und die Anderen (I and the Others), 2006, as Nicky
- Eine traumhafte Beziehung, 2005, Susanne
- Das Puppenspiel (The Puppy Game), 2005, Puppy

== Theatre ==
- Hänsel und Gretel, 2010, as Hexe
- Weihnachten in Transsilvanien (Christmas in Transylvania), 2009, as Venetia
- Die Ratten, 2006, as Frau John
- Woyzeck, 2006, as Marie
- Yard Girls, 2006, as Bo
- Die Zoogeschichte (The Zoo Story), 2004, as Jerry
- Antigone, 2004, as Antigone
- Das Zieglein..., 2003, as Hapeangul
- Arsen und Spitzenhäubchen, 2003, as Mortimer
- Bird Cage, 2003, as Agador
- Top Dogs, 2003, as Krause
- Das Hohelied, 2002, as Sie
- Biedermann ... Brandstifter, 2002, as Babette
