= Cansu Dere =

Turkish actress (born 1980)

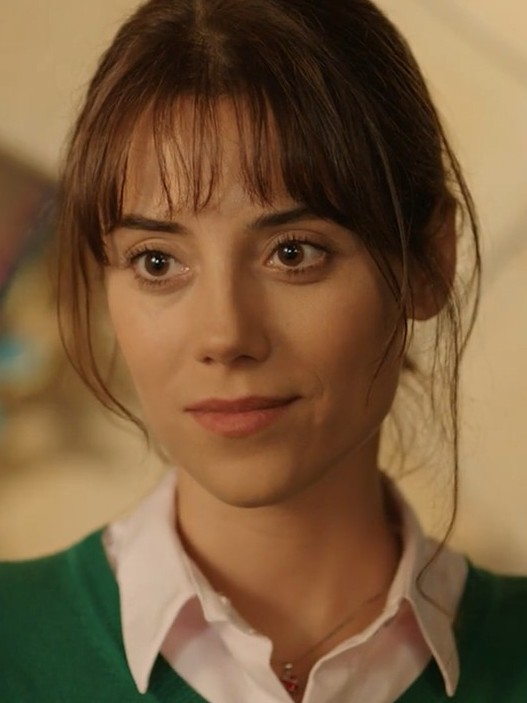
- Dere in 2012
- Born: 14 October 1980 (age 46); Ankara, Turkey
- Education: Istanbul University
- Occupations: Actress, model, TV Host and presenter
- Years active: 1998–present
- Website: www.cansudere.com.tr

Cansu Dere (born 14 October 1980, Ankara) is a Turkish actress, model, TV host and beauty pageant titleholder who was crowned Miss Turkey Universe 2000.

== Early life ==
Her mother partly descends from the Turkish community in Thessaloniki, Greece, while her father descends from the Turkish community in Bulgaria.

She completed her primary and secondary education in İzmir. In 2000, she was due to represent Turkey in the Miss Universe pageant, but Cansu withdrew due to political issues between Turkey and Cyprus (Host country of the Miss Universe in 2000); Turkey had no relations with the Republic of Cyprus. She was forbidden by the Turkish Government to travel to the 2000 Miss Universe pageant in Cyprus unless she could pass through Northern Cyprus, which was then forbidden for any visitor to the Republic of Cyprus. The competition committee in Turkey made arrangements for her to travel through Athens, but the day before her departure the government refused to let her go, "for political reasons". This was the second delegate that was not allowed to represent Turkey that year.

Shortly thereafter, the former Miss Turkey started to work as a professional model. She left the Archeology Department of Istanbul University and focused on the modeling profession. Representing Turkey in all international organizations of Istanbul Textile and Apparel Exporters' Association, Cansu Dere participated in various fashion shows in Paris in 2002 and 2003 and worked with many important photographers.

== Career ==
=== Tv Series ===
In 2006-2008, she played the character of 'Sıla' in the TV series Sıla with Mehmet Akif Alakurt. In 2009-2011, she played the character of 'Eyşan' in the Ezel series. She played the Iranian Safavid spy 'Firuze/Huymerya' in Magnificent Century in 2012-2013. She played the character of 'Zeynep Güneş' in the TV series Anne with Beren Gökyıldız, who played her daughter Turna/Melek in 2016-2017. From 2020-2022, Cansu played the character of 'Asya Yılmaz' in the TV series Sadakatsiz, the Turkish adaptation of the English-made Doctor Foster series broadcast on Kanal D, in which she shared the lead role with Caner Cindoruk and Melis Sezen.

=== Web Series ===
She played in crime Şahsiyet which won International Emmy Award.

=== Films ===
In 2007, she portrayed the character of 'Defne' with Kenan İmirzalıoğlu in the movie Son Osmanlı Yandım Ali. In 2009, she took a role in the black comedy Acı Aşk. With her ex-lover Cem Yılmaz, she had cameo role as American dancer in hit period comedy "Yahşi Batı". With Hazal Kaya, Erdal Beşikçioğlu, she played franchise crime series "Behzat Ç.: Seni Kalbime Gömdüm".

== Filmography ==
Cinema
Year	Title	Role	Notes	
2006	Kabuslar Evi: Takip	Köylü Esma	Supporting role	
2007	Son Osmanlı Yandım Ali	Defne	Leading role	
2009	Acı Aşk	Oya	Leading role	
2009	Totally Spies!	Alex	Turkish dubbing voice	
2010	Yahşi Batı	Mary Lou	Supporting role	
2011	El Yazısı	Zeynep	Leading role	
2011	Behzat Ç. Seni Kalbime Gömdüm	Songül	Leading role	
2026	Portekiz Aşkı	Yasemin	Leading role	
Television Series
Year	Title	Role	Notes	Channel
2004	Metro Palas	Nazan	Leading role	Show TV
2005	Alacakaranlık	Irmak Bozoğlu	Supporting role	Show TV
2005	Güz Yangını	Ceylan	Leading role	Show TV
2007	Avrupa Yakası	Bahar	Guest actor	ATV
2006-2008	Sıla	Sıla Genco	Leading role	ATV
2009	Altın Kızlar	Ceylan	Leading role	ATV
2009-2011	Ezel	Eyşan Tezcan	Leading role	Show TV/ ATV
2012-2013	Muhteşem Yüzyıl	Firuze - Hümeyra	Supporting role	Star TV
2016-2017	Anne	Zeynep Güneş	Leading role	Star TV
2019	Ferhat ile Şirin	Banu Karalı	Leading role	FOX
2020-2022	Sadakatsiz	Asya Yılmaz	Leading role	Kanal D
Web Series
Year	Title	Role	Notes	Platform
2018	Şahsiyet	Nevra Elmas	Leading role	puhutv
2026	Binbir Gece Masalları		Leading role	Tabii
