= Cold of Kalandar =

2015 film

- Film poster
- Directed by: Mustafa Kara
- Written by: Mustafa Kara; Bilal Sert
- Produced by: Nermin Aytekin; Iván Angelusz
- Starring: Haydar Sisman
- Cinematography: Cevahir Sahin; Kürsat Üresin
- Edited by: Ali Aga; Umut Sakallioglu; Serhat Solmaz
- Music by: Eleonore Fourniau
- Distributed by: M3-film
- Release dates: 28 October 2015 (Tokyo IFF); 16 September 2016 (Turkey)
- Running time: 139 minutes
- Country: Turkey
- Language: Turkish
- Box office: $59,784

Cold of Kalandar (Turkish: Kalandar Soğuğu) is a 2015 Turkish drama film directed by Mustafa Kara. It was selected as the Turkish entry for the Best Foreign Language Film at the 89th Academy Awards but it was not nominated.

== Cast ==
- Haydar Sisman
- Nuray Yesilaraz
- Hanife Kara
- Ibrahim Kuvvet
- Temel Kara

== Awards ==
At the 2016 Haifa International Film Festival, Cold of Kalandar received two awards: the "Golden Anchor" Award (Best Film in the Mediterranean Film Competition) and the Fedeora Award by the Federation of Film Critics of Europe and the Mediterranean for Best Foreign Film. It also won the award for Best Film at the 2016 Asia Pacific Screen Awards, and IFFI ICFT UNESCO Gandhi Medal at the 47th International Film Festival of India

== See also ==
- List of submissions to the 89th Academy Awards for Best Foreign Language Film
- List of Turkish submissions for the Academy Award for Best Foreign Language Film
