= Ember (film) =

- Kor
- Directed by: Zeki Demirkubuz
- Written by: Zeki Demirkubuz
- Starring: Aslıhan Gürbüz; Caner Cindoruk; Taner Birsel
- Cinematography: Sercan Sert
- Edited by: Zeki Demirkubuz
- Release date: 22 April 2016
- Running time: 115 minutes
- Countries: Turkey; Germany
- Language: Turkish

Ember (Turkish: Kor) is Turkish director Zeki Demirkubuz's 11th film and is featured in the International Golden Tulip Competition. Shooting began in February 2015 in various districts of Istanbul, especially Eyüp and Güzeltepe. The Turkish-German co-production stars Taner Birsel, Aslıhan Gürbüz, Caner Cindoruk, İştar Gökseven, Talha Yayıkçı, Dolunay Soysert and Çağlar Çorumlu in the leading roles. The film was selected to be screened in the Contemporary World Cinema section at the 2016 Toronto International Film Festival.

== Cast ==
- Aslıhan Gürbüz as Emine
- Caner Cindoruk as Cemal
- Taner Birsel as Ziya
