= Ahsen Eroğlu =

Turkish actress

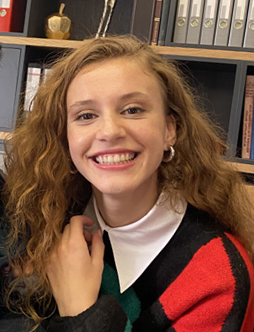
- Eroğlu in 2021
- Born: 27 October 1994 (age 31); Çorlu, Turkey
- Occupation: Actress
- Years active: 2015–present

Ahsen Eroğlu (born 27 October 1994) is a Turkish actress.

== Life and career ==
Eroğlu was born on 27 October 1994 in Çorlu. Her family is of Turkish descent who immigrated from Bulgaria. She finished her education at Ege University School of Physical Education. She later received acting lessons at Sahne 3MOTA.

She started her acting career in 2015 with her role in the Modern Habil Kabil TV series as Zehra. She then portrayed Meleki Hatun in the historical drama Muhteşem Yüzyıl: Kösem, before being cast in recurring roles in Anne, Kızlarım İçin, and İstanbullu Gelin.

In 2019, she had her first leading role in the TV series Kuzgun, in which she played the role of Kumru Cebeci. In 2020, Eroğlu appeared in a leading role in the series Menajerimi Ara, an adaptation of the French TV series Dix pour cent. In 2020, she portrayed the character of Gizem in the movie Geranium (Sardunya). She is also in the lead role in the theater play The Girl in the Tree, adapted from Şebnem İşigüzel's novel of the same name.

In 2026, Eroğlu was one of those detained as part of the drug investigation in Istanbul where several public figures were listed.

== Filmography ==
Films
Year	Title	Role
2019	Aylin	Aylin
2020	Sardunya (Geranium)	Gizem
2023	Merve Kült	Merve
2023	Do Not Disturb: Ayzek ile Bir Gece	
2023	İstanbul Trilogy: Meze	
2023	Başlangıçlar	
Web series
Year	Title	Role
2024	Kübra	Gülcan
2024	Erşan Kuneri	
TV series
Year	Title	Role
2015	Modern Habil Kabil	Zehra
2016	Muhteşem Yüzyıl: Kösem	Meleki Hatun
2016–2017	Anne	Duru Güneş
2017	Kızlarım İçin	Suna
2018	İstanbullu Gelin	Yaz Deniz Boran
2019	Kuzgun	Kumru Cebeci
2020–2021	Menajerimi Ara	Dicle Ertem
2024	Deha	Esme
2025-2026	Rüya Gibi	Çigdem

== Awards and nominations ==
Year	Award	Category	Result
2021	Sinema Port Awards	Best Debut by an Actress	Won
2021	Flying Broom International Women's Film Festival	Young Witch Award	Won
2021	Pantene Altın Kelebek	Pantene Parlayan yıldız ( new rising star award )	Won
