= Sarp Akkaya =

Turkish actor

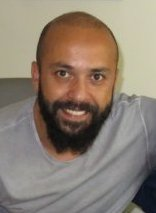
- Born: 13 May 1980 (age 46); Istanbul, Turkey
- Occupation: Actor
- Years active: 1995–present
- Spouse: Sinem Yalçınkaya (m. 2017)
- Children: 1

Sarp Akkaya (born 13 May 1980) is a Turkish actor.

== Career ==
He began acting at the age of twelve along with his twin brother Kaya Akkaya. Their older sister Esra Akkaya is also an actress. Sarp Akkaya and Kaya Akkaya played in TV series Bizim Aile and Muhteşem Yüzyıl together.

He is best known for his role as Sarı Bilal in Suskunlar which the first Turkish drama sold to the USA market for remake, as Tefo in Ezel, and as Atmaca in Muhteşem Yüzyıl. He graduated in theatre from Mimar Sinan Fine Arts University.

== Theatre ==
- Markalı Hava
- Albay Kuş
- Devenin Hörgücü Yamuk Olur

== Film ==
- Takıntılar - 2024
- Atatürk - 2023 (Enver Pasha)
- Sen Ben Lenin - 2021 (Police)
- Beni Çok Sev - 2021 (Musa)
- 7. Koğuştaki Mucize - 2019 (Müdür Nail)
- Kaybedenler Kulübü Yolda - 2018 (Alper)
- Kötü Çocuk - 2017 (Vural Askaya)
- Eksik - 2015
- El Yazısı - 2012
- Kötü Çocuk
- Labirent - 2011
- Firar - 2011
- Kurtlar Vadisi Irak - 2006

== Television ==
- Kalpazan - 2024 (Tarık)
- Kopuk - 2024 (Esat Avkıran)
- Maviye Sürgün - 2023 (Minotor)
- Sıfırıncı Gün - 2022–2023 (Fatih)
- Evlilik Hakkında Her Şey - 2021–2022 (Sergen Günay)
- Saygı - 2021 (Selim Hacioğlu)
- Çukur - 2021 (Şahram)
- Ayak İşleri 2021 (Burhan)
- Ferhat ile Şirin - 2019 (Kemal)
- Kurşun - 2019 (Aydın Kara)
- Söz - 2018–2019 (Dragan Ratkoviç)
- Paramparça - 2016–2017 (Damir)
- Evli ve Öfkeli 2015–2016 (Murat)
- Racon 2015 (Recep Güldağ)
- Muhteşem Yüzyıl - 2013–2014 (Atmaca)
- Şubat 2013 (Lodos)
- Suskunlar - 2012–2013 (Bilar/Sari)
- Mavi Kelebekler 2011 (Halil Latiç)
- Ezel - 2009–2011 (Tefo/Tevfık Bostanci)
- Gece Gündüz - 2009
- Sürgün Hayatlar - 2008
- Beni Unutma - 2008
- Şöhret Okulu - 2007
- Ertelenmiş Hayatlar - 2007
- Kurtlar Vadisi Pusu - 2007 (Servet)
- Nefes Nefese - 2005
- Ah Be İstanbul - 2004
- Bizim Aile - 1996

== Voice acting ==
- Dante (Kurtlar Vadisi Irak) 2006
- Oktay (Arka Sıradakiler) 2007–2010/ 1–121
