= Love Me Instead =

- Turkish: Beni Çok Sev
- Directed by: Mehmet Ada Öztekin
- Starring: Sarp Akkaya; Ercan Kesal; Songül Öden; Aleyna Özgeçen
- Production companies: Lanistar Media; Same Film
- Distributed by: Netflix
- Release date: 19 November 2021
- Country: Turkey
- Language: Turkish

Love Me Instead (Turkish: Beni Çok Sev) is a 2021 Turkish film directed by Mehmet Ada Öztekin and starring Sarp Akkaya, Ercan Kesal, Songül Öden and Aleyna Özgeçen. The film was released by Netflix on November 19, 2021.

== Plot ==
Musa has served 14 years in prison and has remaining 3 more years to finish his sentence to be a free man. Musa is given a special permission for a single day to meet his daughter and come back to prison where he has to finish his remaining 3 years. He prepares himself to meet his daughter for the very first time after 14 years, the last time when he saw his daughter, she was a toddler. To this effect, Prison Guard Sedat is assigned to escort Musa to his home, meet his daughter and get him back to prison. Musa's daughter is under the care of his old friend Nuriye.

In the flashback it is revealed that, Musa had shot and killed a man who had attempted to sexually abuse Nuriye. It is further revealed that Musa had an extra marital affair with Nuriye. Musa surrenders to the police while his wife pledges that he will never see his daughter again. Shortly after that Musa's wife dies in a traffic accident and his daughter is tossed around by unwilling grandparents and she ends up under Nuriye's care.

Musa meets his daughter, Yonca, and is filled with joy. He sneaks out of the house while Sedat is asleep and goes around town with his daughter, and visits the restaurant which he used to frequent when he was a child.

Nuriye's neighbourhood is plagued with drug dealers and especially Haluk who owns the gambling and bar den often preys upon Muse's daughter subtly. It is revealed that Haluk has a fetish for school girls when he watches a pornographic video on his laptop featuring a woman dressed in a school uniform.

Musa's mother is still alive, but she does not recognise Musa at first as she suffers from intermittent dementia.

Musa, Nuriye, Sedat and Yonca proceed to the bus station. Musa is emotional as he is about to depart, and he shockingly asks Yonca who she is and reveals that he knows that she is not his daughter. It is then revealed that when Musa was about to leave the house to the Bus station, his mother suddenly regains her memory and has told the truth that the girl he has met is not his daughter. It is further revealed that Musa's daughter, who was a drug addict, has died many years ago and to spare his feelings, Nurse had lied to him that his daughter was alive and presented another girl, who was in her care as his own daughter.

Musa proceeds to avenge the people who was responsible for his daughter's death, but Sedat warns him not to. Musa offers him a choice either to shoot him or let him go. Sedat lets him go and even gives his service weapon.

Musa goes to the neighbourhood and shoots every last one of the gang member and finally is shot dead by the police who arrives on the scene.

In the last scene, Layla now a Law graduate is dining with Sedat, Sedat's wife and Nuriye toasts to Musa and calls him her father who she got only a day to spend with but will remain her father for the rest of her life. Musa and Leila's picture in the frame is shown in the ending scene.

== Cast ==
- Sarp Akkaya - Musa
- Ercan Kesal - Sedat
- Aleyna Özgeçen - Yonca/Leyla
- Songül Öden - Nuriye
- Ushan Çakır - Inspector 1
- Doğukan Polat - Inspector 2
- Füsun Demirel - Nebahat
- Sinan Arslan - Haluk
- Ali Seçkiner Alici - Apo
- Su Burcu Yazgı Coşkun - Selen
- Serpil Özcan - Nihan
- Kaan Altay Köprülü - Emre
- Onur Bilge - Kadir
- Güner Özkul - Gülendam
- Melis Adaş
- Yıldırım Burak Deniz
