= Turkish women in cinema =

Turkish women in cinema refers to Turkish actresses and to female movie directors in Turkish cinema. The first Turkish film was made in 1914; the first Turkish film with actresses was not shot until 1919. The first leading actress in Turkish cinema was Bedia Muvahhit in 1923. In a conservative Muslim society, Muvahhit's film was a milestone.

== Actresses ==
- Adile Naşit
- Afife Jale
- Ahu Tuğba
- Ahu Türkpençe
- Ajda Pekkan
- Aliye Rona
- Arzu Yanardağ
- Arzum Onan
- Aslı Tandoğan
- Aydan Şener
- Ayla Algan
- Aysun Kayacı
- Ayşegül Aldinç
- Ayşen Gruda
- Azra Akın
- Başak Köklükaya
- Begüm Birgören
- Begüm Kütük
- Belgin Doruk
- Beren Saat
- Berrak Tüzünataç
- Binnur Kaya
- Birce Akalay
- Burcu Biricik
- Cahide Sonku
- Cansu Dere
- Ceyda Ateş
- Çağla Kubat
- Çolpan İlhan
- Damla Sönmez
- Demet Akbağ
- Demet Evgar
- Deniz Akkaya
- Derya Alabora
- Didem Balçın
- Didem Erol
- Doğa Bekleriz
- Dolunay Soysert
- Ece Erken
- Elçin Sangu
- Ekin Tunçay Turan
- Emel Sayın
- Esin Varan
- Esra Bilgiç
- Ezgi Eyüboğlu
- Fahriye Evcen
- Fatma Girik
- Filiz Akın
- Gamze Özçelik
- Gökçe Bahadır
- Gönül Yazar
- Gül Gölge
- Gülben Ergen
- Gülse Birsel
- Gülşen Bubikoğlu
- Güven Hokna
- Hale Soygazi
- Hande Ataizi
- Hazal Kaya
- Hatice Aslan
- Hülya Avşar
- Hülya Koçyiğit
- Hümeyra Akbay
- Itır Esen
- İdil Fırat
- Lale Oraloğlu
- Leyla Sayar
- Melis Birkan
- Melisa Sözen
- Meltem Cumbul
- Merve Boluğur
- Merve Sevi
- Meryem Uzerli
- Mine Teber
- Mine Tugay
- Miray Daner
- Muhterem Nur
- Müjde Ar
- Naz Elmas
- Nebahat Çehre
- Nefise Karatay
- Nehir Erdoğan
- Neslihan Atagül
- Neyyire Neyir
- Nur Sürer
- Nurgül Yeşilçay
- Özgü Namal
- Özge Özberk
- Özge Özpirinçci
- Özge Törer
- Özge Yağız
- Özlem Conker
- Pelin Batu
- Pelin Karahan
- Perran Kutman
- Sanem Çelik
- Sedef Avcı
- Selin Demiratar
- Selma Ergeç
- Seray Kaya
- Serenay Sarıkaya
- Sevda Dalgıç
- Sevinç Erbulak
- Sibel Kekilli
- Sinem Kobal
- Songül Öden
- Şebnem Dönmez
- Şebnem Sönmez
- Şenay Gürler
- Şevval Sam
- Tuba Büyüküstün
- Tuba Ünsal
- Tuğba Özay
- Türkan Şoray
- Ümmiye Koçak
- Vahide Perçin
- Yaprak Özdemiroğlu
- Yasemin Kozanoğlu
- Yelda Reynaud
- Yeşim Büber
- Yıldız Kaplan
- Yıldız Kenter
- Zeynep Değirmencioğlu
- Zeynep Tuğçe Bayat
- Zuhal Olcay

== Movie directors ==
- Aslı Özge
- Bilge Olgaç
- Cahide Sonku
- Deniz Gamze Ergüven
- Pelin Esmer
- Seda Eğridere
- Türkan Şoray
- Yeşim Ustaoğlu

== Filmmakers ==
- Tuluhan Tekelioğlu
