= The Masked Singer Turkey =

Turkish singing competition TV show

- Genre: Reality competition; Panel show
- Based on: King of Mask Singer by Munhwa Broadcasting Corporation
- Presented by: Tansel Öngel
- Starring: Eda Ece; Melis Sezen; Alican Yücesoy; Doğu Demirkol
- Country of origin: Turkey
- Original language: Turkish
- No. of seasons: 2
- No. of episodes: 9

Original release
- Network: FOX
- Release: 1 January – 12 February 2022

Related
- Masked Singer franchise

The Masked Singer Turkey (Turkish: Maske Kimsin Sen?) is a Turkish reality singing competition television series based on the Masked Singer franchise which originated from the South Korean version of the show King of Mask Singer, premiered FOX on January 1, 2022, produced by MedYapım, presented by Tansel Öngel, jury Eda Ece, Melis Sezen, Alican Yücesoy and Doğu Demirkol. The show ended after one season following rumors about cancellation.

== Format ==
Famous celebrities with different costumes and masks fight to keep their identities a secret on-and-off the stage. They sing with their own voices while competing with each other in the form of duo or trio duels. The audience and the jury try to guess who the competitor is, with clue packages given in prepared videos prepared as well asking questions to the masks. The contestant who gets the fewest votes from the audience with their performance at the end of their match gets sent to risk. Finally, the contestant who gets the fewest votes among the masks at risk is eliminated from the contest and must remove his or her mask.

== Contestants ==
Stage Name	Celebrity	Occupation	Episodes								
Stage Name	Celebrity	Occupation	1	2	3	4	5	6	7	8	9
Lion (Aslan)	Özge Borak	Actress	WIN		WIN		SAFE		SAFE	SAFE	WINNER
Peacock (Tavuskuşu)	Emre Altuğ	Singer		RISK		WIN		SAFE	SAFE	SAFE	RUNNER-UP
Unicorn	Berna Laçin	Actress	WIN		WIN		SAFE		SAFE	SAFE	THIRD
Raven (Kuzgun)	Kubilay Aka	Actor		WIN		WIN		SAFE	SAFE	SAFE	FINALIST ^{(4th)}
Duck (Ördek)	Aslı Bekiroğlu	Actress		RISK		WIN		SAFE	SAFE	SAFE	FINALIST ^{(5th)}
Deer (Geyik)	Burcu Özberk	Actress		WIN		RISK		SAFE	SAFE	SAFE	FINALIST ^{(6th)}
Dinosaur (Dinozor)	Müge Boz	Actress	WIN		RISK		SAFE		SAFE	OUT	
Dragon (Ejderha)	Cemal Hünal	Actor	RISK		WIN		SAFE		OUT		
Mirror (Ayna)	Biran Damla Yılmaz	Actress		WIN		RISK		OUT			
Knight (Şövalye)	Ender Saraç	Doctor	RISK		RISK		OUT				
Skeleton (İskelet)	Keremcem	Singer		WIN		OUT					
Tree (Ağaç)	Derya Baykal	Actress	WIN		OUT						
Gladiator (Gladyatör)	Hazer Amani	Chef		OUT							
Lookout (Gözcü)	Ümit Karan	Footballer	OUT								

The masked singer was safe from elimination.
The masked singer was eliminated from the competition.
The masked singer did not perform.

== Episodes ==
=== Episode 1 (1 January) ===
Performances on the first episode
#	Stage name	Song	Identity	Result
1	Unicorn	"Boş Vermişim Dünyaya" by Ajda Pekkan	undisclosed	WIN
2	Lookout	"Ele Güne Karşı" by MFÖ	Ümit Karan	OUT
3	Lion	"Everyway That I Can" by Sertab Erener	undisclosed	WIN
4	Knight	"Ben Tabii ki" by Ümit Sayın	undisclosed	RISK
5	Dinosaur	"Seni Yerler" by Sezen Aksu	undisclosed	WIN
6	Dragon	"Resimdeki Gözyaşları" by Cem Karaca	undisclosed	RISK
7	Tree	"Kolbastı" by Sinan Yılmaz	undisclosed	WIN

=== Episode 2 (2 January) ===
Performances on the second episode
#	Stage name	Song	Identity	Result
1	Peacock	"Bahçe Duvarından Aştım" by Neşet Ertaş	undisclosed	RISK
2	Deer	"Martılar" by Edis	undisclosed	WIN
3	Raven	"Way Down We Go" by Kaleo	undisclosed	WIN
4	Duck	"Cambaz" by Mor ve Ötesi	undisclosed	RISK
5	Skeleton	"Rüya" by Ünlü	undisclosed	WIN
6	Mirror	"Uslanmıyor Bu" by Zeynep Bastık	undisclosed	WIN
7	Gladiator	"We Will Rock You" by Queen	Hazer Amani	OUT

=== Episode 3 (8 January) ===
Performances on the third episode
#	Stage name	Song	Identity	Result
1	Lion	"Bambaşka Biri" by Ajda Pekkan	undisclosed	WIN
2	Tree	"Kim Arar Seni" - Nilüfer	Derya Baykal	OUT
3	Knight	"Dalgalandım Da Duruldum" by Müzeyyen Senar	undisclosed	RISK
4	Unicorn	"Olanlar Oldu Bana" by Ajda Pekkan	undisclosed	WIN
5	Dragon	"Tek Başına" by Ayten Alpman	undisclosed	WIN
6	Dinosaur	"Deli Divane" by Ebru Gündeş	undisclosed	RISK

=== Episode 4 (9 January) ===
Performances on the fourth episode
#	Stage name	Song	Identity	Result
1	Mirror	"Seviyorum Sevmiyorum" by Nil Karaibrahimgil	undisclosed	RISK
2	Duck	"Benim Ol" by Edis	undisclosed	WIN
3	Raven	"Yalnızlık Senfonisi" by Sezen Aksu	undisclosed	WIN
4	Deer	"Bütün Kızlar Toplandık" by Nil Karaibrahimgil	undisclosed	RISK
5	Peacock	"Giderim" by Ahmet Kaya	undisclosed	WIN
6	Skeleton	"Can Bedenden Çıkmayınca" by Barış Manço	Keremcem	OUT

=== Episode 5 (15 January) ===
- Special Performance: "Uykusuz Her Gece" by Ajda Pekkan performed by Tansel Öngel

Performances on the fifth episode
#	Stage name	Song	Identity	Result
1	Knight	"Gökte Yıldız Ay Misun" by Modern Folk Üçlüsü	Ender Saraç	OUT
2	Lion	"Hüp" by Tarkan	undisclosed	SAFE
3	Unicorn	"Mavi Boncuk" by Emel Sayın	undisclosed	SAFE
4	Dragon	"Yağmurlar" by Şebnem Ferah	undisclosed	SAFE
5	Dinosaur	"Sımsıkı Sıkı Sıkı" by Kenan Doğulu	undisclosed	SAFE

=== Episode 6 (22 January) ===
Performances on the sixth episode
#	Stage name	Song	Identity	Result
1	Deer	"Of Of" by Gülşen	undisclosed	SAFE
2	Duck	"Bir Daha" by Zeynep Bastık	undisclosed	SAFE
3	Raven	"Feeling Good" by Michael Bublé	undisclosed	SAFE
4	Mirror	"Ya Sonra" by Ajda Pekkan	Biran Damla Yılmaz	OUT
5	Peacock	"Maalesef" by Mansur Ark	undisclosed	SAFE

=== Episode 7 (29 January) "Sezen Aksu Night" ===
- Group Performance: "Hadi Bakalım" with Tansel Öngel

Performances on the seventh episode
#	Stage name	Song	Identity	Result
1	Unicorn	"Onu Alma Beni Al"	undisclosed	SAFE
2	Peacock	"Sen Ağlama"	undisclosed	SAFE
3	Duck	"Aşktan Ne Haber"	undisclosed	SAFE
4	Dragon	"Kalbim Ege'de Kaldı"	Cemal Hünal	OUT
5	Deer	"Kaç Yıl Geçti Aradan"	undisclosed	SAFE
6	Raven	"Seni Kimler Aldı"	undisclosed	SAFE
7	Dinosaur	"Kahpe Kader"	undisclosed	SAFE
8	Lion	"Rakkas"	undisclosed	SAFE

=== Episode 8 (5 February) ===
Performances on the eighth episode
#	Stage name	Song	Identity	Result
1	Duck	"Haydi Söyle" by İbrahim Tatlıses	undisclosed	SAFE
2	Peacock	"Duyanlara Duymayanlara" by Cengiz Kurtoğlu	undisclosed	SAFE
3	Lion	"Dert Bende" by Mine Koşan	undisclosed	SAFE
4	Deer	"Benim İçin Üzülme" by Ali Tekintüre	undisclosed	SAFE
5	Dinosaur	"Gündüzüm Seninle" by Ferdi Özbeğen	Müge Boz	OUT
6	Unicorn	"Bir Gülü Sevdim" by Zeki Müren	undisclosed	SAFE
7	Raven	"Beni Affet" by Özcan Deniz & Ragıp Savaş	undisclosed	SAFE

=== Episode 9 (12 February) ===
Performances on the ninth episode
#	Stage name	Song	Identity	Result
1	Peacock	"Hayde" by Kâzım Koyuncu	undisclosed	WIN
2	Deer	"Olduramadım" by Özkan Uğur	Burcu Özberk	OUT
3	Duck	"You're the One That I Want" by Olivia Newton-John & John Travolta	Aslı Bekiroğlu	OUT
4	Unicorn	"Çilli Bom" from Hababam Sınıfı	undisclosed	WIN
5	Lion	"İsyan" by Halil Sezai	undisclosed	WIN
6	Raven	"Eye of the Tiger" by Survivor	Kubilay Aka	OUT
Superfinal
1	Peacock	-	Emre Altuğ	RUNNER-UP
2	Unicorn	-	Berna Laçin	THIRD
3	Lion	-	Özge Borak	WINNER
