= Romantic Comedy 2: Farewell to Bachelorhood =

2013 film by Erol Özlev

- Theatrical release poster
- Directed by: Erol Özlevi
- Written by: Ceren Aslan; Aslı Zengin
- Produced by: Murat Tokat
- Starring: Engin Altan Düzyatan; Sinem Kobal; Sedef Avcı; Gürgen Öz; Cemal Hünal
- Cinematography: James Gucciardo
- Music by: Yıldıray Gürgen
- Release date: 14 February 2013
- Running time: 110 minutes
- Country: Turkey
- Language: Turkish
- Box office: 14,623,156.0 TL

Romantic Comedy 2: Farewell to Bachelorhood (Turkish: Romantik Komedi 2: Bekarlığa Veda) is a 2013 Turkish romantic comedy movie and a sequel to Romantic Comedy (2010). The cast of the original movie reprise their roles in this sequel, which was directed by Erol Özlevi.

== Plot ==
While Esra prepares for marriage with excitement, her best friend Didem starts to panic because she is the only single girl among the group and starts to utilize various tactics to convince her lover Cem to marry her. While Didem waits for a marriage proposal, Cem meets Gözde, who is starring in his new film and becomes focused on his work. Didem, upon entering into crises of jealousy, begins to monitor Cem closely. During this follow-up, she learns that men are at a bachelor party in Antalya "Adam & Eve Hotel". So a funny and romantic adventure begins. Girls infiltrate the hotel in oriental disguise to see what the boys are doing at the bachelor party.

== Cast ==
Actor	Role
Sinem Kobal	Didem
Engin Altan Düzyatan	Cem
Burcu Kara	Zeynep
Sedef Avcı	Esra
Gürgen Öz	Yiğit
Cemal Hünal	Mert
Öykü Çelik	Hande
Nurseli İdiz	
Ali Ersan Duru	
Gökçe Özyol	Ergün
Özge Ulusoy	Gözde
Selim Bayraktar	
