= Kudüs Fatihi Selahaddin Eyyubi =

Turkish television series based on Saladin

- Also known as: Salahuddin: The Conqueror of Jerusalem
- Genre: Historical; Adventure; Action
- Based on: Saladin
- Directed by: Sedat Inci
- Starring: Uğur Güneş; Mehmet Ali Nuroğlu; Ozan Dolunay; Barış Baktaş; Gökçe Türkan; Gülper Özdemir; Berk Erçer; Elif Doğan; Olgun Toker; Uygar Özçelik; Eski Başroller; Kaan Çakır; Murat Han; Barış Bağcı; Fırat Çelik; Dilin Döğer; Tuvana Türkay; Berk Cankat; Sezin Akbaşoğulları; Ekin Türkmen; Sezgin Erdemir; Bülent Şakrak; Şahin Irmak; Devrim Evin; Erdinç Gülener
- Country of origin: Türkiye
- Original language: Turkish
- No. of seasons: 2
- No. of episodes: 58

Production
- Executive producers: Sezgin Acuner; Esi Gülce; Kashif Ansari; Junaid Ali Shah
- Cinematography: Halil Aslan
- Camera setup: Single-camera
- Running time: 190 minutes
- Production companies: Akli Film; Ansari Shah Films

Original release
- Network: TRT 1 (Turkey)
- Release: 13 November 2023 – 26 May 2025

Kudüs Fatihi Selahaddin Eyyubi (English: Saladin: The Conqueror of Jerusalem) is a Turkish-Pakistani television series produced by Turkey's Akli Films and Pakistan's Ansari and Shah Films. The series is based on the life of Saladin, the founder of the Ayyubid dynasty. The television series started production in summer 2022. The producers asserted that the main target audience of the series were non-Muslims who were unaware of the Muslim history.

== Plot ==
Season 1

The television series focuses on the life of 12th-century Muslim ruler Saladin and how he conquered Jerusalem Furthermore, it focuses on his struggles and battles against the Crusaders and his goal to unite the Muslim territories of Syria, northern Mesopotamia, Palestine and Egypt under his rule.

In the show, Saladin is depicted as the adopted son of Nur al-Din Zengi who doesn't know that he is adopted and doesn't know his real parents.

Season 2

After getting thrown into the well by Count Miles, Selahaddin gets out with the help of Balian of Ibelin, the younger brother of Hugh, who is on his deathbed. Balian plans to go back to France and live his life as a regular knight, away from all the messy politics in the Kingdom of Jerusalem, but saving Selahaddin changes his fate forever. They both get captured by a slave trader and are taken to Egypt to participate in Dirgham's Spring Festival. The Fatimid vizier Dirgham allies with the new King of Jerusalem, Amalric and plans to let Crusader knights, led by Miles, into Cairo during the festival. Amalric's advisor William of Tyre and chief commander Lord Guy, sent by the Pope both arrive in Jerusalem. Sultan Nureddin sends Sirkuh and Yaruki with Kadı Fazıl to go to Cairo and reinstate Saver as the Fatimid Vizier of Egypt. When they arrive in Cairo, they realize that Selahaddin is already there, they kill Dirgham and Miles, and Saver is placed back on the throne. Amalric releases Raynald de Châtillon from prison, and he raids the city of Gazze. Tensions ensue between Sirkuh and Saver, which ultimately results in the Zengids getting kicked out of Egypt. They are sent back to Egypt again, but this time alongside the army, with intentions to take Egypt from the Fatimids and Saver. On their way to Egypt, the army is poisoned and Selahaddin and his warriors are left alone to defend Egypt from the approaching Crusader army. Just when Selahaddin and Balian are about to clash their swords, the Zengid army arrives thanks to the help of Karategin and both armies clash in what results in a Zengid victory at Babein, the Crusaders are forced to retreat due to Nureddin taking Harim Castle during the battle. Selahaddin, Sirkuh and Yaruki march to Egypt and kill Saver and the rebel Fatimid soldiers. Sirkuh is placed on the throne, but on the same day as his ascension, he gets killed by Saver's son Kâmil. Selahaddin ascends and becomes the Vizier of Egypt, he clashes with both the Caliph of the Fatimid Dynasty and a famous trader Rakif, the power struggle between these 3 ends when Selahaddin's brother Boru arrives in Egypt, Rakif is quickly killed by Boru, after Amalric marries Maria Komnenos. Balian finds out that Amalric's son Baldwin, has leprosy and must be quarantined until a suitable doctor arrives with the necessary treatment. Amalric decides to march to Egypt with an army consisting of the Crusaders, the Knight Templars and the Byzantines. They arrive outside the walls of Egypt, but Selahaddin hears of Baldwin's illness and sends his doctor Latif to go and help heal Baldwin, upon seeing this, Amalric retreats with his soldiers, but Maria, Lord Guy and Raynald disregard his order and stay to take Egypt, a battle ensues but in the end, Sultan Nureddin arrives and kicks the Army of Jerusalem, out of Egypt, again. The Fatimid Caliph dies and Selahaddin is made the "Sultan of Egypt", he marries Şemse Hatun and is given the duty of taking Sultan Nureddin's son, Melik İsmail from Aleppo to Damascus. The governor of Damascus, Gumushtekin, frustrated by this news, ambushes Selahaddin on the road, kills Yaruki and kidnaps Melik İsmail, so he can take him to Damascus himself. Lord Guy is sentenced to execution for disobeying Amalric's orders of retreating, but just as he is about to die, the news of Amalric's sudden and shocking death arrives, Lord Guy survives. Around the same time, in Damascus, Nureddin passes away before meeting Selahaddin one last time. Gumushtekin and Countess Mila kidnap Sultan Melik İsmail and take him to Kerek, in order to trap Selahaddin. Selahaddin uses this as an opportunity to save the Sultan, kill Gumushtekin and make preparations for the Siege of Kerek. Gumushtekin is killed by Gokboru, the Sultan is saved and is taken back to Aleppo in order to stop a rebellion from other Zengid nobles.

Baldwin ascends the throne as the new King of Jerusalem, his sister Sibylla marries Lord Guy, sacrificing her love for Balian and to protect Baldwin from any harm that Lord Guy is capable of doing. Baldwin takes everyone to the Mount of Olives to show his miracle, the knights begin digging to find a chest, and after a while, a chest is found, inside, is the Holy Grail, everybody including Lord Guy recognizes this miracle and pledges allegiance to Baldwin as their King. Baldwin sends Balian for the defense of the Castle of Beytulahzan against Selahaddin. After a few days of the siege, Selahaddin comes up with a plan to dig tunnels underground and take the castle by surprise, the plan fails however and Selahaddin gets shot by a poisonous arrow by Lord Guy. This trap results in Baldwin's first victory as King of Jerusalem.

However, a Muslim sheikh saves Salah ad-Din from death and he, returning to Damascus, defeats the army of King Baldwin approaching the city walls. Subsequently, Salah ad-Din captures the castles of Ibelin and El-Karak, and his brother Böryu marries Seyra, the daughter of the merchant Rakif. After this, the health of the King of Jerusalem deteriorates and he tries to make peace with Salah ad-Din, and the treasurer of Mosul, who at one time took the blame for the crimes of the emir Kam-Elmas, ends up in the hands of Balian of Ibelin and William of Tyre. Peace is concluded between the Ayyubid state and the Kingdom of Jerusalem, but soon the power-hungry Guy de Lusignan kills King Baldwin the Leper, and the cruel knight Renaud de Chatillon kills Salah ad-Din's mother and Serya during an attack on a caravan. Sultan Salah ad-Din defeats the army of the Kingdom of Jerusalem on the battlefield near Hattin and takes King Guy de Lusignan and knight Renaud de Chatillon prisoner. Queen Sibylla and Balian of Ibelin organize the defense of Jerusalem, but the Sultan of Egypt and Syria still manages to conquer the city. Balian is forced to surrender the city to Salaheddin to save the city's people, and encourages Salaheddin to establish the kingdom of heaven there the Crusaders could not make.

== Cast ==
=== Both seasons characters ===
- Ugur Gunes as Selahaddin, also known as Selahaddin Yusuf bin Eyyub . Selahaddin was the founder of the Ayyubid dynasty. Hailing from a Kurdish family, he was the first sultan of both Egypt and Syria. An important figure of the Third Crusade, he spearheaded the Muslim military effort against the Crusader states in the Levant. At the height of his power, the Ayyubid realm spanned Egypt, Syria, Upper Mesopotamia, the Hejaz, Yemen, and Nubia. Father of Ali, husband of Semse Sultan. Brother of Boru, Turan Shah, Sehinshah, brother in law of Sayra. Uncle of Ali (deceased) and Turap. (Deceased)
- Mehmet Ali Nuroğlu as Sultan Nureddin Zengi, was a Turkoman member of the Zengid dynasty, who ruled the Syrian province (Shām) of the Seljuk Empire. He reigned from 1146 to 1174. He is regarded as an important figure of the Second Crusade, adoptive father and superior of Salahuddin.
- Ekin Türkmen as Melike Hatun, first wife of Nur ad-Din Zengi,Sister of Melik Dolat and Sultan Kilij Arsalan.
- Seda Yıldız as Necemeddin Eyyub a soldier and politician from Dvin later Governor under Sultan Nureddin Zengi. Father of Salahuddin. (Deceased)
- Zeynep Kumral as Fatma Hatun, based from Sit Khatun, the wife of Ayyub ibn Shadi and mother of Salahuddin, Boru, Turanshah, Şehinşah,Rabia and mother in law of Semse and Sayra. (Deceased)
- Sezgin Erdemir as Shirkuh, the brother of Ayyub ibn Shadi and uncle of Salahuddin. (Deceased)
- Noor ul Hassan as Abdul Qadir Gilani.
- Olgun Toker as Karategin, based from Sa'ad ad din Ma'sud Ibn Unur. The owner of Tribe of Wolves (tur. Kurtlar Kabilesi) Brother of Ismet and Ilbüke. Uncle of Sultan İsmail.
- Bülent Sakrak as Mevdud Brother of Nurredin and Nusreddin. (Deceased)
- Ahmet Olgun Sünear as Urfalı, warrior of Salahuddin. (Deceased)
- Alou Traore as İbrahim, warrior of Salahuddin.
- Ibrahim Balaban as Bozok, archer warrior of Salahuddin.
- Celal Al as Adsız, main warrior of Salahuddin.
- Erdinç Gülener as Ömer mella, Sultan Nureddin Zengi's spiritual mentor and advisor.(Deceased)
- Egemen Yavuz as Vezir isfahani, based from Imad al-Din al-Isfahani, Vizier of Sultan Nurredin Zengi.
- Murad Karak, as Imad, Sultan Nureddin Zengi Assistant.

=== Season 1 characters ===
- Dilin Döğer as Süreyya Khatun (fictional character), from the Askaloni royal family in the series. She plays a key role in defending the Muslim lands along with the Zengi forces. She was Selahaddin's love interest but was killed by an arrow from Halifa of Fatimid dynasty.(deceased)
- Tuvana Türkay as Queen Viktoria, who ruled Jerusalem, after that, her brother Amarlic killed her in the season finale. (Deceased)
- Firat Çelik as Gregor, a fictional character and brother of Gabriel.(Deceased)
- Berk Cankat as Bloody Bernard, the brother of Elisa and betrothed to Queen Victoria, who briefly took over Damascus (tur.Şam), and then ruled over Gaza (tur.Gazze) until Salahuddin killed him when he took over the city. (Deceased)
- Murat Han as Count Gabriel, brother of Gregor. He defeated the Askalanis and took over the city. Queen Victoria's fiancé. Killed by Salahuddin when he recaptured Askalon. (Deceased)
- Özgür Cem Tugluk as Pars, one of the assistants of Salahuddin. Gregor killed him.(deceased)
- Kaan Çakır as Nussreddin Zengi based from Nasr ed din Zengi, brother of Nur ad-Din Zengi and Mawdud Zengi. Father of Izzetin, husband of Berra Hatun. (Deceased)
- Kartal Can Ermis as Demircan, one of Salahuddin's warriors. Since Avram murder him.(Deceased)
- Baki Davrak as Avram, the fictional character who wants to establish the Sultanate for the Judaism. Killed by Salahuddin when he retrieves Damascus. (Deceased)
- Abdul Susler as Senetial Pierre, who was assistant with King Baldwin and later Queen Victoria's. Murdered by Queen Victoria's brother, Amalric when he took over the Jerusalem as the King. (Deceased)
- Fatih Yilmaz as Şimon, the assistant of Avram. Killed by Adsiz. (Deceased)
- Izzet Yüksek as Izzetin, son of Nussreddin Zengi and Berra Hatun. (Deceased)
- Burcu Kirman as Elisa, sister of Bernard. In Jerusalem Queen Victoria killed by slicing her neck after Bernard's death. (Deceased)
- Anil Özdemirci as Musab, one of helper with Salahuddin. Leonard murdered him.(deceased)
- Burak Sarimola as Shehinshah, the oldest son of Ayyub ibn Shadi and eldest brother of Selahaddin. Died when Gabriel's soldiers were taking over Askalon. (Deceased)
- Kaan Uluca as Baldwin III of Jerusalem. Queen Victoria poisoned him and took over the throne of Jerusalem. (Deceased)
- Sezgin Uzunbekiroglu as Esma, auntie of Surreyya Hatun, sister of Mansur, who murdered by Bernard when he getting Damascus.(deceased)
- Yildirim Gücük as Mansur, brother of Esma, father of Surreyya Hatun. Killed by Gabriel.(Deceased)
- Ali Ersan Duru as Turan-Shah, an elder brother of Salahuddin. (Deceased)
- Ece Özdikici as Berra Hatun, wife of Nussreddin and mother of Izzetin. (Deceased)
- Sezin Akbaşoğulları as Ismet Hatun who was the daughter of a regent of Damascus. Wife of Nur ad-Din Zengi, she passes away due to Melike Hatun poisoning her and the baby.(Deceased)
- Barış Bağcı as Rashid ad-Din Sinan/Shaykh al Jabal.
- Aleyna Sirin as Rabia Hatun,based from Rabia Khatoon, daughter of Ayyub ibn Shadi and Fatma Hatun (Fatima Khatun), sister of Shahinshah, Turanshah, Selahuddin and Boru.
- Asuman Bora as Kutlu Hatun,mother of Sultan Nurredin, Mevdud and Nussreddin.
- Ahmet Can Aras as Loris, soldier of Gabriel and later Gregor. Killed by Bozok. (Deceased)

=== Season 2 characters ===
- Uygar Özçelik as Qadi Fazil.
- Devrim Evin as King Amalric I of Jerusalem.(Deceased)
- Barış Baktaş as Böru, based from Taj al-Muluk Abu Sa'id Buri, Salahuddin's younger brother.
- Hakan Yufkacıgil as William, Advisor of King Amalric.
- Ozan Dolunay as Balian of Ibelin.
- Bertug Kursat Alp as Baldwin IV of Jerusalem. (Deceased)
- Elif Doğan as Mila Countess of Kerak, widow of Count Miles, wife of Chatillon.
- Berk Erçer as Lord Guy, Christian noble, later husband of Sibylla, later King of Jerusalem.
- Gökçe Türkan as Şemse Hatun, a Christian singer & dancer, Salahuddin love interest later wife, based from Shamsa Khatun.
- Arif Diren as Latif, the healer. (Deceased)
- Barış Yıldız as Çemşit, Assistant of Countess Mila.
- Şahin Irmak as Emir Yaruki, Sultan Nureddin Commander.
- Gülper Özdemir as Sibylla, Queen of Jerusalem.
- Atilgan Gümüş as Şaver, based from Shawar. Vizier of Egypt, killed by Shirkuh. (Deceased)
- Burak Demir, as Chatillon, based from Raynald of Châtillon. New Count of Kerak, husband of Mila, friend of Guy.
- Göksu Melek Ulucan as Sayra, Rakif's daughter who swore vengeance to Boru.
- Gizem Ünsal as Princess Maria, based from Maria Komnene, Queen of Jerusalem, Byzantine Emperor niece, second wife of King Amalrik, become queen of Jerusalem.
- Melih Çardak as Dirgam, based on Dirgham. Former Vizier of Egypt, killed by Saver.
- Teoman Kumbaracıbaşı as Tacir (Trader/Merchant) Rakif, most powerful merchant of Egypt, loyal to Egypt Fatimid Caliph, enemy of Salahuddin, Killed by Boru.

== Episodes ==
=== Series overview ===
Season	Episodes	Originally released	
Season	Episodes	First released	Last released
1	28	November 13, 2023	June 10, 2024
2	30	October 21, 2024	May 26, 2025

=== Season 1 (2023–2024) ===
No.	Title	Directed by	Written by	Original release date
1	"1. Bölüm"	Sedat Inci	Isa Yildiz	13 November 2023
2	"2. Bölüm"	Sedat Inci	Unknown	20 November 2023
3	"3. Bölüm"	Sedat Inci	Unknown	27 November 2023
4	"4. Bölüm"	Sedat Inci	Unknown	4 December 2023
5	"5. Bölüm"	Sedat Inci	Unknown	18 December 2023
6	"6. Bölüm"	Sedat Inci	Unknown	25 December 2023
7	"7. Bölüm"	Sedat Inci	Unknown	1 January 2024
8	"8. Bölüm"	Sedat Inci	Unknown	8 January 2024
9	"9. Bölüm"	Sedat Inci	Unknown	22 January 2024
10	"10. Bölüm"	Sedat Inci	Unknown	29 January 2024
11	"11. Bölüm"	Sedat Inci	Unknown	5 February 2024
12	"12. Bölüm"	Sedat Inci	Unknown	12 February 2024
13	"13. Bölüm"	Sedat Inci	Unknown	19 February 2024
14	"14. Bölüm"	Sedat Inci	Unknown	26 February 2024
15	"15. Bölüm"	Sedat Inci	Unknown	4 March 2024
16	"16. Bölüm"	Sedat Inci	Unknown	11 March 2024
17	"17. Bölüm"	Sedat Inci	Unknown	18 March 2024
18	"18. Bölüm"	Sedat Inci	Unknown	25 March 2024
19	"19. Bölüm"	Sedat Inci	Unknown	1 April 2024
20	"20. Bölüm"	Sedat Inci	Unknown	8 April 2024
21	"21. Bölüm"	Sedat Inci	Unknown	15 April 2024
22	"22. Bölüm"	Sedat Inci	Unknown	22 April 2024
23	"23. Bölüm"	Sedat Inci	Unknown	29 April 2024
24	"24. Bölüm"	Sedat Inci	Unknown	6 May 2024
Salahuddin captured Mevdud and managed to confront Bernard as a result of a trap he set. With an unexpected move, Bernard manages to escape from Saladin’s grasp. Saladin goes to Dolat and Sultan Nureddin without Bernard. His aim is to try to stop Dolat by making Mevdud talk.
25	"25. Bölüm"	Sedat Inci	Unknown	13 May 2024
Bernard, who lost Gaza, is sentenced to death by the Papacy. But he somehow saves himself and puts his new plans into action. Queen Victoria, on the other hand, thinks that after the Zengis’ conquest of Gaza, it may be Al-Quds’ turn and takes action to make a peace treaty with the Zengis, but Bernard prevents the agreement that Victoria is about to make.
26	"26. Bölüm"	Sedat Inci	Unknown	20 May 2024
Selahaddin takes revenge for Süreyya by killing Mülhem (who killed Sureyya), but due to Temur’s unexpected move, he loses the beys. While Temur thinks he will save the beys, Bernard appears before them and captures them again.
27	"27. Bölüm"	Sedat Inci	Unknown	3 June 2024
28	"28. Bölüm"	Sedat Inci	Unknown	10 June 2024
Victoria's brother reaches Kudus and kills Pierre and Victoria. Sultan Nureddin receives a personal letter upon reading it, he then orders Shirkuh to take his army to Egypt. The episode ends with a faint Selahaddin lying at the bottom of a well.

=== Season 2 (2024–2025) ===
No.	Title	Directed by	Written by	Original release date
29	"29. Bölüm"	Sedat Inci	Isa Yildiz	21 October 2024
When Selahaddin has saved, until he will move on Cairo, Karategin announcing his leaving.
30	"30. Bölüm"	Sedat Inci	unknown	28 October 2024
31	"31. Bölüm"	Sedat Inci	unknown	4 November 2024
32	"32. Bölüm"	Sedat Inci	unknown	11 November 2024
33	"33. Bölüm"	Sedat Inci	unknown	18 November 2024
34	"34. Bölüm"	Sedat Inci	unknown	25 November 2024
35	"35. Bölüm"	Sedat Inci	unknown	2 December 2024
36	"36. Bölüm"	Sedat Inci	unknown	9 December 2024
37	"37. Bölüm"	Sedat Inci	unknown	16 December 2024
38	"38. Bölüm"	Sedat Inci	unknown	23 December 2024
39	"39. Bölüm"	Sedat Inci	unknown	30 December 2024
40	"40. Bölüm"	Sedat Inci	unknown	13 January 2025
41	"41. Bölüm"	Sedat Inci	unknown	20 January 2025
42	"42. Bölüm"	Sedat Inci	unknown	27 January 2025
43	"43. Bölüm"	Sedat Inci	unknown	3 February 2025
44	"44. Bölüm"	Sedat Inci	unknown	10 February 2025
45	"45. Bölüm"	Sedat Inci	unknown	17 February 2025
46	"46. Bölüm"	Sedat Inci	unknown	24 February 2025
47	"47. Bölüm"	Sedat Inci	unknown	3 March 2025
48	"48. Bölüm"	Sedat Inci	unknown	10 March 2025
49	"49. Bölüm"	Sedat Inci	unknown	17 March 2025
50	"50. Bölüm"	Sedat Inci	unknown	24 March 2025
51	"51. Bölüm"	Sedat Inci	unknown	7 April 2025
52	"52. Bölüm"	Sedat Inci	unknown	14 April 2025
53	"53. Bölüm"	Sedat Inci	unknown	21 April 2025
54	"54. Bölüm"	Sedat Inci	unknown	28 April 2025
55	"55. Bölüm"	Sedat Inci	unknown	5 May 2025
56	"56. Bölüm"	Sedat Inci	unknown	12 May 2025
57	"57. Bölüm"	Sedat Inci	unknown	19 May 2025
58	"58. Bölüm"	Sedat Inci	unknown	26 May 2025

== Production ==
=== Development ===
"Th

series is not only for Muslims or Pakistan and Turkish population but also to show the world that there was a Muslim ruler whose opponents also appreciated his courage, justice, bravery and equality."

— Kashif Ansari, one of the producers

On 20 August 2021, the agreement between Emre Konuk, owner of Akli Film Production and Pakistan's Ansari & Shah Films producers Dr. Kashif Ansari and Dr. Junaid Ali Shah, on the production of this new series titled Selahaddin Eyyubi was signed in Belgrade. Emre tweeted:

A happy news on a blessed Friday night! Contract signed between Akli Films and Ansari&Shah Films about ‘Sultan Selahaddin Ayyubi’. May this international project, which will be prepared with the cooperation of Turkey and Pakistan, be beneficial to our country and our art world.

On 18 October 2021, the delegation from Turkey landed in Islamabad International Airport to begin auditions for the drama series in Lahore and Karachi.

=== Casting ===
The series will feature actors from both Turkey and Pakistan. 75% of the show cast will be Turkish including Selahaddin and the rest of 25% cast will be from Pakistan. In this regard, Turkey's Akli Film Production announced to scout for talent in Pakistan from October 28 to November 1 of 2021 in Lahore, Karachi, and Islamabad.

=== Filming ===
The TV series is being shot in Turkey and is planned to have three seasons. Each season will have 34 episodes as revealed by Adnan Siddiqui. Production began on January 29, 2022, as producer, Emre Konuk posted an image with the caption, "Selahaddin Eyyubi yakında!" (English: Selahaddin Eyyubi soon) on his Instagram.

=== Writing ===
"The series focuses on the Quran, history and religious harmony. How the Quran can be used effectively to govern empires that are embraced by people of all religions."

— Adnan Siddiqui, one of the producers

Selahaddin Eyyubi will use sixteen writers over its three seasons. The historical series is being written by Turkish historians with the assistance of Pakistan's paleographers and research writers. Kashif Ansari imparted that screenwriters for the series have enlisted the help of Turkish historians, researchers and authors to make it as close to reality as possible. The initial work on the series was completed in September, after that, screen testing began once the casting was done.

== Release ==
=== Turkey ===
Kudüs Fatihi Selahaddin Eyyubi premiered in Turkey on 13 November 2023 on TRT 1. It ended with its final episode on 26 May 2025.

=== Pakistan ===
The series' first episode premiered in Pakistan on Hum TV on 6 May 2024.

== See also ==
- List of Islam-related films
