= Öykü Çelik =

Turkish actress (born 1987)

- Born: 13 July 1987 (age 38); Istanbul, Turkey
- Occupation: Actress
- Years active: 2006–present
- Spouse: Ahmet Murat Çakan (m. 2014; div. 2015)

Öykü Çelik (born 13 July 1987) is a Turkish actress.

== Biography ==
Çelik was born in 1987 in Istanbul. Her father is a football coach. She studied at the Bilkent University Theater Department but was forced to leave the school temporarily after suffering from injuries and burns in an accident. She then continued her education by taking private theater lessons. Çelik has since appeared in many TV series.

In 2014, She had lead role in the hit comedy "Yeşil Deniz". The series came back with new season in 2023. She isn't in the cast of the new season.

Her notably other main roles are in "Nuri", "Benim İçin Üzülme" and film "Bensiz".

She made her debut on television in 2006 with a role in the fantasy child series Selena. She continued supporting role her career by appearing in popular series such as Poyraz Karayel, military series "Savaşçı". She played in period series Bir Zamanlar Osmanlı: Kıyam, "Mahsusa: Trablusgarb". With Engin Altan Düzyatan, she starred in the historical drama Diriliş: Ertuğrul, film Romantik Komedi 2: Bekarlığa Veda and short horror film "Cin Geçidi".

== Personal life ==
Öykü Çelik married Ahmet Murat Çakan in 2014 in Bursa, however the couple divorced the next year. In 2020, she started dating Ismail Berhan.

== Filmography ==
Films
Year	Title	Role	Notes
2009	Kanımdaki Barut		
2010	Mahpeyker Kösem Sultan	Mahfiruz	
2012	Saba		
2013	İki Kafadar: Chinese Connection	Nazan	
2013	Romantik Komedi 2: Bekarlığa Veda	Hande	
2014	Bensiz		
2015	Darbe		
2018	Prangalı Yarim		
2019	Kapan	Aslı	
2019	Ölü Yatırım	Hayalet Kız	
2021	Hababam Sınıfı Yaz Oyunları	Zeynep	
2022	İşin Aslı	Aslı	
Web Series
Year	Title	Role	Notes
2023	Mahsusa: Trablusgarb	Leyla	Leading role
TV Series
2006	Selena		
2008	Akasya Durağı	Gözde	
2009	Kasaba	Zehra	
2010	Gönülçelen	Nazar	
2011	Nuri	Reyna	
2012	Bir Zamanlar Osmanlı: Kıyam	Çeşmidil	
2012	Benim İçin Üzülme	Bahar	
2014	Ağlatan Dans	Begüm	
2014	Yeşil Deniz	Sedef	
2015	Poyraz Karayel	Dafne	
2016	Hayat Sevince Güzel	Emine	
2017	Savaşçı	Yeter Alayunt	
2018	Diriliş: Ertuğrul	Sırma Hatun	(season 5)
2020	Şeref Sözü	Yasemin Adabeyli	
2021	Benim Hayatım	Meral	
Short Film
Year	Title	Role	Notes
2008	Cin Geçidi	Bahar	
