= Tansel Öngel =

Turkish actor

- Born: Deniz Tansel Öngel; 24 September 1976 (age 49); Kilis, Turkey
- Occupation: Actor
- Years active: 1999–present
- Spouse: Özge Özder (m. 2007; div. 2010)

Deniz Tansel Öngel (born 24 September 1976) is a Turkish actor.

== Life and career ==
Öngel is the child of an immigrant family. After Ottoman Empire collapsed, His paternal grandmother was a Turkish immigrant from Thessaloniki, while his maternal grandmother is of Lebanese descent, and his grandfather is of Egyptian descent . He was born in Kilis, where his parents worked as teachers, and later grew up in Ankara. Öngel graduated from the Hacettepe University Ankara State Conservatory in 2000 with a degree in theatre studies. In the same year, he started working as manager and actor for the Turkish State Theatres in Trabzon and later joined the Istanbul State Theatre.

He made his television debut in 2004 with the series Uy Başımıza Gelenler, starring alongside Hakan Yılmaz and Başak Köklükaya. He had the leading role in series Elveda Derken and the 2010 series Kılıç Günü, directed by Osman Sınav and Raşit Çelikezer. He had guest roles in popular series such as Avrupa Yakası, Kaybolan Yıllar, Geniş Aile.

Öngel further rose to prominence with his portrayal of Alvise Gritti in Muhteşem Yüzyıl for 36 episodes. His period role are in Bu Kalp Seni Unutur Mu?, Ya İstiklal Ya Ölüm, Son Mektup, Kalbimin Sultanı, Mavera, Mucize.

Between 2012 and 2014, he was among the leading cast of Benim İçin Üzülme, starring alongside Fulya Zenginer, Barış Arduç, Çağlar Ertuğrul, Selin Şekerci and Öykü Çelik. He later appeared as Mert in the series Yaz'ın Öyküsü alongside Vildan Atasever, Ece Çeşmioğlu. He played in sequel detective series Kanıt: Ateş Üstünde.

== Theatre ==
- A Streetcar Named Desire : Tennessee Williams - Oyun Atölyesi - 2017
- Coriolanus : William Shakespeare - Istanbul State Theatre - 2016
- The Great Gatsby : Scott Fitzgerald - Istanbul State Theatre - 2015
- Incendies : Wajdi Mouawad - Istanbul State Theatre - 2011
- Doğal Zehir : Eric Chappel - Trabzon State Theatre - 2009
- The Dumb Waiter : Harold Pinter - Trabzon State Theatre - 2007
- Benerci Kendini Niçin Öldürdü : Nâzım Hikmet - Istanbul State Theatre - 2005
- All My Sons : Arthur Miller - Trabzon State Theatre - 2004
- Little Shop of Horrors : Howard Ashman - Trabzon State Theatre - 2003
- Twelfth Night : William Shakespeare - Trabzon State Theatre - 2003
- Whose Life Is It Anyway? : Brian Clark - Trabzon State Theatre - 2002
- A Midsummer Night's Dream : William Shakespeare - Trabzon State Theatre - 2001
- Kurban : Güngör Dilmen - Trabzon State Theatre- 2000
- Zengin Mutfağı : Vasıf Öngören - Trabzon State Theatre - 1999
- Yaşar Ne Yaşar Ne Yaşamaz : Aziz Nesin - Trabzon State Theatre - 1999
- Birimiz Hep İçin : Zühtü Erkan - Trabzon State Theatre - 1999

== Filmography ==
=== TV series ===
- Hayat Bugün (2022–) : Aras Erdem
- Mavera (2021) : Mahmud
- Masumlar Apartmanı (2020–2022) : Naci
- Kırmızı Oda (2020) - Tarık
- Ya İstiklal Ya Ölüm (2020)
- Kalbimin Sultanı (2018) : Namık Paşa
- Kanıt Ateş Üstünde (2016) : Kaan
- Yaz'ın Öyküsü (2015) : Mert
- Benim İçin Üzülme (2012) : Niyazi
- Muhteşem Yüzyıl (2011) : Alvise Gritti
- Geniş Aile (2010) : Cihangir (guest appearance)
- Kılıç Günü (2010) : Kılıç Ali
- Bu Kalp Seni Unutur Mu? (2009) : Yalçın
- Elveda Derken (2007) : Kerim
- Adak (2006) : Zeynel
- Güz Yangını (2005) : Kerem
- Kaybolan Yıllar (2006) : guest appearance
- Kısmet (2005)
- Avrupa Yakası (2005) : Demir (guest appearance)
- Uy Başuma Gelenler (2004) : Volkan

=== TV programs ===
- Maske Kimsin Sen? (2022) - presenter

=== Film ===
- Hayalet: 3 Yasam (2020) - Nevzat
- Kader Postası (2019)
- Bizim Köyün Şarkısı (2018) - Mehmet
- Babamın Kanatları (2016) - Resul
- Son Mektup (2015) - Salih Ekrem
- Mucize (2014) - Cemilo
- Dekupe (2011) - Serkan
- Kısmet (2004) - Kadir
