= Begüm Kütük =

Turkish actress and model (born 1980)

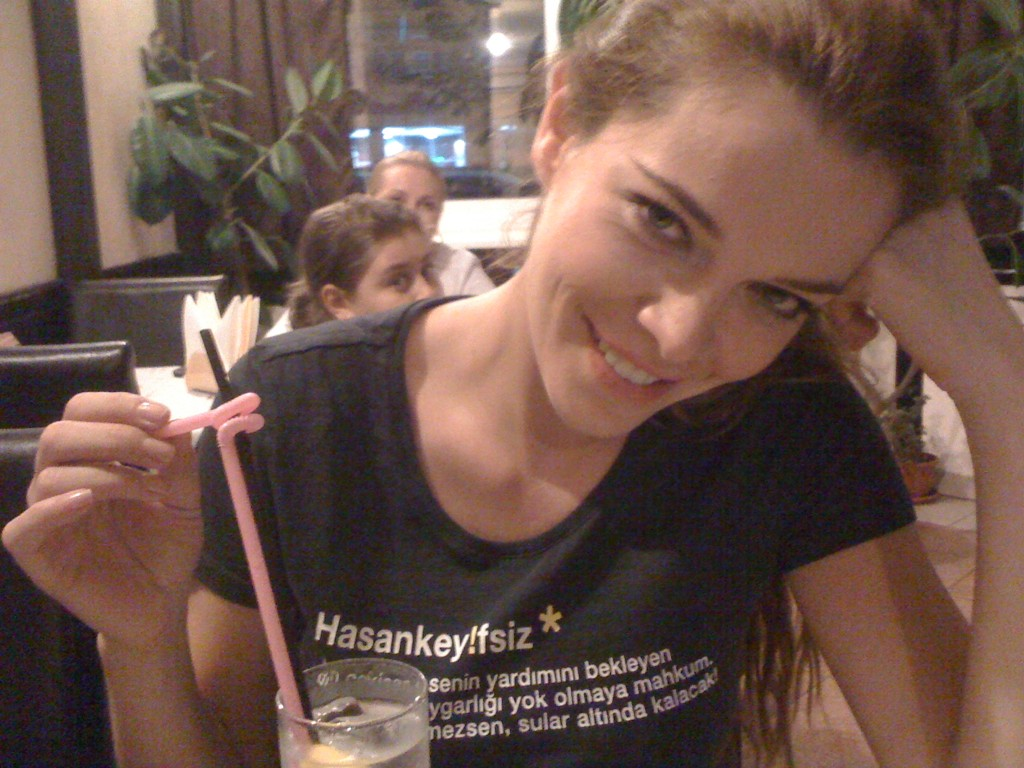
- Born: 27 August 1980 (age 45); İzmir, Turkey
- Occupations: Actress, model
- Years active: 2002–present
- Spouse: Erdal Yaşaroğlu (m. 2010)

Begüm Kütük Yaşaroğlu (born 27 August 1980) is a Turkish actress and model.

== Biography ==
Begüm Kütük was born and raised in İzmir. Her maternal family is of Bosniak descent and her paternal family is of Kosovo Albanian descent. She attended Tevfik Fikret Fen High School and studied Business Administration at Anadolu University in Eskişehir where she also played in the volleyball team. She started working as a professional model and competed in "Best Model of Turkey" 2001 where she finished as 2nd runner up. In 2002, she began her acting career with a lead role in the TV series Melek.

Recently, Kütük appeared in the films Gecenin Kanatları and Romantik Komedi. Kurtlar vadisi pusu 2013. She also had a lead role in the TV series Çalıkuşu.

In 2014 Begum started playing the role of "Defne" in the Turkish hit series Kaderimin Yazıldığı Gün opposite Özcan Deniz. The series has been aired at other countries including Greece and Romania, where it is very popular.

Kütük has been married to Erdil Yaşaroğlu since 2010.
