= Haziran Gecesi =

- Directed by: Andaç Haznedaroğlu
- Starring: Özcan Deniz; Naz Elmas; Burcu Kara
- Theme music composer: Gökhan Kırdar
- Country of origin: Turkey
- Original language: Turkish
- No. of episodes: 62

Production
- Producer: Faruk Turgut
- Running time: 90 min

Original release
- Network: Kanal D
- Release: March 10, 2003 – February 20, 2006

Haziran Gecesi ("June night" or "Night of June") is a Turkish romantic drama television series that was shown in Kanal D. It started in 2004 and had 62 episodes. The main actors were played by Özcan Deniz (Baran Aydın), Naz Elmas (Havin Kozanoğlu) and Burcu Kara (Duygu Zorlu-Aydın). Gökhan Kırdar composed the soundtrack to the series which also includes "Yağmur" ("Rain").

== Story ==
Havin is a university student. She and her friend Lale are struggling for money to pay the rent and other expenses. Lale arranges a job where they would be dating at a party for some politicians. Havin is hesitant but they are desperately need the money so they go with it. Havin is secretly photographed with one whose name is Ural Aydın. Ural Aydin's son Baran returns the next day from Italy to start a jewellery business. He meets Havin at a party and falls in love with her. Baran's mother Kumru does not like Havin and she prefers that Baran marry Duygu who she thinks is more suitable for him. Baran and Havin become very close together and plan to be married. But as they are on the way for the wedding, they have a car accident. Both survive the crash but Havin is injured badly. Kumru makes a deal that she will save Havin if Havin will leave Baran and go away from his life. Havin loves Baran but she accepts. Baran is told that Havin is dead and he is devastated by the news. After mourning for Havin, he marries Duygu. After many years, he has three children from Duygu and he is happy with her. But then, he coincidentally sees Havin after so many years except that she now calls herself Sibel. But Sibel can't keep the facade anymore and soon they are united together. But this causes a problem because Baran is already married with children to Dugyu.
