= Kıvanç Kasabalı =

Turkish actor of Circassian descent

- Born: 24 February 1975 (age 51); Istanbul, Turkey
- Occupations: Actor, model
- Years active: 1996–present
- Height: 1.83 m (6 ft 0 in)
- Spouse: Sedef Avcı (m. 2005)
- Children: 1

Kıvanç Kasabalı (born 24 February 1975) is a Turkish actor of Circassian descent and model.

Kasabalı is a graduate of Uludağ University with a degree in communication studies. After appearing in minor roles, his breakthrough came with Kanal D series Yaprak Dökümü, which was well received by fans and critics. In 2013, he portrayed the character of Sinan in the TV series Merhamet, acting alongside Özgü Namal, İbrahim Çelikkol, Burçin Terzioğlu, Mustafa Üstündağ and Yasemin Allen. In 2014, he was cast in the series Ağlatan Dans, and shared the leading role with Öykü Çelik and Arsen Gürzap.

== Filmography ==
Television
Year	Title	Role	Notes
1999	Ayrılsak da Beraberiz	Italian man	Guest appearance
2005	Kanlı Düğün	Cemal	
2006–2010	Yaprak Dökümü	Cem	Leading role
2010	Küçük Kadınlar	Ozan	3rd season
2010	Samanyolu	Ali	
2013–2014	Merhamet	Sinan	2nd season
2014	Ağlatan Dans	Zoloy	Leading role
2015	Analar ve Anneler	Selçuk	Leading role
2016–2017	Bodrum Masalı	Nejat	Leading role
2017	Siyah Beyaz Aşk	Sinan	Supporting role
2018	Yasak Elma	Sinan	Supporting role
2019	Aries		Leading role
2020	Şehirden Uzakta		
2022	Evlilik Hakkında Her Şey	Ceyhun Özdemir	Supporting role
2025	Kizilcik Serbeti	Murat	Guest appearance
