= Menekşe ile Halil =

- Genre: Drama, Romance
- Created by: Kerem Catay
- Written by: Ece Yörenç; Melek Gençoğlu
- Directed by: Uluç Bayraktar
- Starring: Kıvanç Tatlıtuğ; Sedef Avcı
- Country of origin: Turkey
- Original language: Turkish
- No. of seasons: 1
- No. of episodes: 36

Production
- Producer: Ay Yapım
- Production locations: Istanbul; Berlin; Mostar

Original release
- Network: Kanal D Euro D (repetitions published); Star TV (repeats)
- Release: September 7, 2007 – May 24, 2008

Menekşe ile Halil is a Turkish melodrama produced by Ay Yapım and originally broadcast by Kanal D in 2007–2008. A total of 30 episodes were produced, headlined by actor Kıvanç Tatlıtuğ.

The series was Tatlıtuğ's return to the screen following the international phenomenon of Gümüş (Noor) and was intended to build on its success. Over 85 million people watched the final episode of Gümüş, vaulting Tatlıtuğ to a household name in the Arab world. Menekşe ile Halil became part of the wave of international popularity of Turkish dramas.

== Plot ==
Menekşe (Violet) is a 20-year-old Turkish girl born in Urfa and living with her family in Germany. Menekşe has fallen in love with a Bosnian, Halil, who is a co-worker at the pastry shop at which she works. However, her conservative father arranges Menekşe's marriage to Mustafa, a Turkish man, for a bride price of 25,000 euros. Threatened by her father with murder, Menekşe is forced to follow through with the marriage. Halil attends the wedding and is astonished to discover his lover is the bride. That night, Mustafa reveals his brutal nature and physically assaults Menekşe, who narrowly escapes. Her grandmother tells Menekşe to run away to Istanbul with Halil. Menekşe and Halil return to Turkey separately but eventually find each other.

Menekşe's father orders Mustafa and Menekşe's brother, Kadir, to go Istanbul and hunt Menekşe and Halil down and perform an honor killing of the couple. Despite several close calls, Menekşe and Halil can escape and attempt to build a life for themselves in Istanbul. Menekşe's entire family eventually relocates to Turkey. Halil is revealed to have been the son of a wealthy man but is now the target of many betrayals as well as officially engaged to another woman. Mustafa becomes a serial killer in his journey to exact revenge on Menekşe. Kadir undergoes a transformation in his view of his sister and ultimately refuses to kill her. Menekşe's father keeps the feud alive but finds himself an outcast from the rest of the family as the series ends.

Ultimately, Menekşe and Halil can resolve the issues with both families. Menekşe's father grudgingly reconciles and the couple marries. However, Mustafa kills Halil and Menekse is left pregnant with his child.

== Cast ==
Actor	Role
Sedef Avcı	Menekşe Doğantürk
Kıvanç Tatlıtuğ	Halil Tuğlu *
Murat Daltaban	Mithat Ates *
Hasan Küçükçetin	Mustafa Genc *
Caner Candarlı	Kadir Doğantürk
Fırat Tanış	Yusuf Doğantürk
Yıldız Kültür	Zarif Doğantürk
Mehmet Çevik	Hasan Doğantürk
Nergis Çorakçı	Süheyla Doğantürk
Ekin Türkmen	Zeynep Sönmez
Tamay Kılıç	Lale Doğantürk
Gökçer Genç	Inspector Ömer
Gülce Uğurlu	Emine
Nihat Alptuğ Altınkaya	Semih
Jennie Gerdes	Helga
Begüm Benian	Sema Ateş
