= Burcu Kara =

Turkish actress

- Born: 1 March 1980 (age 46); Bursa, Turkey
- Education: Anadolu University
- Occupation: Actor
- Years active: 2004–present
- Spouses: Buğra Gülsoy (m. 2011; div. 2012) Fırat Parlak (m. 2016)
- Children: 1
- Website: burcukara.com

Burcu Kara (born 1 March 1980) is a Turkish actress. She is best known for hit series Haziran Gecesi and franchise films Romantik Komedi, Romantik Komedi 2: Bekarlığa Veda.

She joined 18th season of police series Arka Sokaklar. She was cast in "Şuursuz Aşk", "Elveda Derken", "Kördüğüm", "O Şimdi Mahkum", "Kırmızı Oda", "Fandom", "Hakim", "Dünyayı Kurtaran Adamın Oğlu. Her period roles are in "Tatar Ramazan", "Keşke Hiç Büyümeseydik", "İpsiz Recep", "Tozlu Yollar".

Her husband Fırat Parlak is a filmmaker and narrator.

== Filmography ==
=== TV series ===
- Haziran Gecesi (Duygu) (2004)
- Elveda Derken (Zeynep) (2007)
- İpsiz Recep (Ayşe) (2008)
- Maskeli Balo (Zeynep) (2010)
- Kirli Beyaz (Zeynep) (2010)
- Yıllar Sonra (Seda) (2011)
- Tozlu Yollar (Feraye) (2013)
- Tatar Ramazan (Ebru) (2013)
- Milat (Gökçe) (2015)
- Kördüğüm
- Keşke Hiç Büyümeseydik (Serpil) (2018)
- Kırmızı Oda (Zuhal) (2020)
- Fandom
- Hakim (Ayşe Korkmaz) (2022)

=== Film ===
- O Şimdi Mahkum (Speaker) (2005)
- Dünyayı Kurtaran Adamın Oğlu (Princess Maya) (2006)
- Romantik Komedi (Zeynep) (2010)
- Romantik Komedi 2: Bekarlığa Veda (Zeynep) (2013)
- Şuursuz Aşk (2019)
- Uçuş 811

=== TV programs ===
- Cinesinema – 2005
- Burcu'yla – 2007
- Bayram Zamanı – 2007
- Benim Yolum – 2008
- NTV Yılbaşı – 2009
- Bi Dünya Tasarım – 2010–2013

== Theatre ==
- Güllü (Güllü) (2007)
- Tatlı Çarşamba (Ellen) (2012)
- Eğlenceli Cinayetler Kumpanyası (2015)
