= Elle Style Awards (Turkey) =

Annual ELLE Style Turkish Awards

The ELLE Style Turkish Awards are an awards ceremony hosted annually by ELLE Turkey magazine.

== List of award winners ==
=== 2010 ===
Winners of the ELLE Style Awards 2010 (or originally named: ELLE Style Awards 2010) for the first time in 2010:

- Man of the Year: Kıvanç Tatlıtuğ
- Woman of the Year: Beren Saat
- Model of the Year: Sedef Avcı
- Music of the Year (Man): Emre Aydın
- Music of the Year (Woman): Şebnem Ferah
- Businesswoman of the Year: Ümit Boyner
- Businessman of the Year: Rahmi Koç
- Style of the Year: Ajda Pekkan
- Breakthrough Talent: Taylor Momsen
- Outstanding Achievement in Fashion: Christopher Bailey
- Lifetime Achievement in Fashion: Salvatore Ferragamo
- Hotel of the Year: W Istanbul
- Place of the Year: Changa
- Photographer of the Year: Koray Birand
- Young Fashion Designer of the Year: Zeynep Tosun
- Designer of the Year: Hakan Yıldırım
- Schwarzkopf Special Award: Güzide Duran

=== 2011 ===
Winners of the ELLE Style Awards 2011 (or originally named: ELLE Style Awards 2011) for the second time in 2011:

- Man of the Year: Okan Yalabık
- Woman of the Year: Tuba Büyüküstün
- Music of the Year (Man): Harun Tekin
- Music of the Year (Woman): Sıla
- Businesswoman of the Year: Gülden Yilmaz
- Businessman of the Year: Akın Öngör
- Style of the Year: Nebahat Çehre
- Place of the Year: Salt
- Jewelry Designer of the Year: Ece Şirin
- Photographer of the Year: Ayten Yilmaz
- Young Fashion Designer of the Year: Ersöz Ata
- Designer of the Year: Arzu Kaprol
- Modan's leading blogger: Garance Dore
- Idea Leader: Lisa Birnbach
- Lifetime Achievement Award: Tommy Hilfiger
- Special Award Fashion Vision: Scott Schuman

=== 2012 ===
Winners of the ELLE Style Awards 2012 (or originally named: ELLE Style Awards 2012) for the third time in 2012:

- Man of the Year: Mehmet Günsür
- Woman of the Year: Demet Evgar
- Music of the Year (Man): Murat Boz
- Music of the Year (Woman): Nil Karaibrahimgil
- Businesswoman of the Year: Oya Eczacıbaşı
- Businessman of the Year: Ali Koç
- Style of the Year: Burcu Esmersoy
- Designer of the Year: Bora Aksu
- Young Fashion Designer of the Year: Tolga Turan
- Photographer of the Year: Emre Güven
- Jewelry Designer of the Year: Nazan Pak & Ela Cindoruk
- Place of the Year: Salt Galata
- Lifetime Achievement in Jewelry: Leyla Adler
- Fashion Visionary: Barbara Bui
- International Style Icon: Olivia Palermo
- Lifetime Achievement in Fashion La Maison: Sonia Rykiel

=== 2013 ===
Winners of the ELLE Style Awards 2013 (or originally named: ELLE Style Awards 2013) for the fourth time in 2013:

- Man of the Year: Burak Özçivit
- Woman of the Year: Gülse Birsel
- Music of the Year (Man): Yalın
- Music of the Year (Woman): Hadise
- Businesswoman of the Year: Candan Kıramer
- Businessman of the Year: Alican Ulusoy
- Style of the Year: Ahu Yağtu
- Fashion Designer of the Year: Ayse Ege, Ece Ege & Dice Kayek
- Young Fashion Designer of the Year: Serkan Cura
- Photographer of the Year: Emre Doğru
- Jewelry Designer of the Year: Arman Suciyan
- Venue of the Year: Zeugma Mosaic Museum
- Innovative Brand of the Year: Billstore
- TV Series of the Year: Intikam
- Style Owner's Hair Award of the Year: Serenay Sarikaya
- Outstanding Achievement in Fashion: Cecilia Bönstörm / Zadig & Voltaire
- Fashion Visionary: Dean Caten & Dan Caten
- Lifetime Achievement in Fashion: Kean Etro / ETRO
- Emerging Designer of the year: Peter Copping & Nina Ricci

=== 2014 ===
Winners of the ELLE Style Awards 2014 (or originally named: ELLE Style Awards 2014) for the fifth time in 2014:

- Man of the Year: Çağatay Ulusoy
- Woman of the Year: Fahriye Evcen
- Music of the Year (Man): Ozan Dogulu
- Music of the Year (Woman): Atiye
- Businesswoman of the Year: Galya Frayman Molinas
- Fashion Designer of the Year: Ayse Ege, Ece Ege & Dice Kayek
- Young Fashion Designer of the Year: Hande Mikrak
- Designer of the Year: Dilek Hanif
- ELLE Icon of the Year: Hande Ataizi Harvey
- TV Series of the Year: Medcezir
- Sustainable Environment Project: Lipton Sustainable Tea Farming Project
- Place of the Year: Baksý Museum
- Breakthrough Model Of The Year: Frida Aasen
- Blogger Of The Year: Pelayo Diaz
- Visionary Instagrammer: Patrick Janelle
- Outstanding Achievement In Fashion: Roland Mouret
- Fashion Visionary: Zuhair Murad
- Lifetime Achievement In Fashion: Angela Missoni

=== 2015 ===
Winners of the ELLE Style Awards 2015 (or originally named: ELLE Style Awards 2014) for the sixth time in 2015:

Winners Determined by Public Vote

- Actress of the Year: Sinem Kobal
- Actor of the Year: Berk Cankat
- Female Music Star of the Year: Gülşen
- Male Music Star of the Year: Gökhan Özoğuz

Winners Determined by Jury Selection

- Style Icon of the Year: Yasemin Özilhan
- Young Fashion Designer of the Year: Giray Sepin
- Jewelry Designer of the Year: Verda Alaton

Jury Special Awards

- Fashion Designer of the Year: Nedret Taciroğlu
- Venue of the Year: SANAYI 313

== See also ==
- List of fashion awards
