= Anadolu Kartalları =

- Directed by: Ömer Vargi
- Starring: Engin Altan Düzyatan; Çağatay Ulusoy
- Release date: October 28, 2011 (Turkey)
- Running time: 86 minutes
- Country: Turkey
- Language: Turkish
- Box office: ₺10,217,302

Anadolu Kartalları (Anatolian Eagles) is a Turkish film directed by Ömer Vargi and released in 2011. It is produced by the production company Fida Film, and stars Engin Altan Düzyatan, Özge Özpirinçci and Çağatay Ulusoy.

The film, commissioned for the centenary of the Turkish Air Force, was filmed in collaboration with the Turkish Air Force in the air base in Konya. Some aerial scenes were notably performed by Türk Yıldızları and Solo Türk, the aerobatic team of the Turkish Air Force. After cult film 1963 ”Şafak Bekçileri” about airforce, Anadolu Kartalları is second big film about Turkish airforce.

The film is the sixth-biggest hit of 2011 Turkish box office, with a total of 1,179,190 entries and grossing 10,217,302 Turkish liras.

== Cast ==
- Engin Altan Düzyatan – Kemal Tanaçan
- Çağatay Ulusoy – Onur Ahmet
- Özge Özpirinçci – Ayşe Dinçer
- Hande Subaşı – Müzisyen Burcu
- Alpay Kemal Atalan – Mustafa Hızarcı
- Alper Saldıran – Fatih Karakuş
- Ekin Türkmen – Özlem
