= Samanyolu =

Single by Berkant

from the album Samanyolu
- B-side: "Özledim Seni"
- Released: 1967
- Genre: Easy listening
- Label: Sevilen, Televizyon
- Songwriter: Metin Bükey

"Samanyolu" (literally "Milky Way") is a Turkish melody which was a hit in 1968. "Samanyolu" was the theme music of a 1967 film with the same title.The film is based on Kerime Nadir's 1940 novel of the same name. It stars Hülya Koçyiğit as Zülal and Ediz Hun as Nejat. The opus has been brought to the silver screen and the television numerous times, first being in 1959, a black white film version starring Belgin Doruk as Zülal, Göksel Arsoy as Nejat. In 1989, a mini series version starring Aydan Şener as Zülal, Tolga Savacı as Nejat was produced and between 2009-2010, a TV series version starring Vildan Atasever as Zülal, Özcan Deniz as Nejat.

The melody became very popular and the composer Metin Bükey decided to release its record after adding lyrics. He collaborated with Teoman Alpay for the lyrics. It was sung by Berkant Akgürgen (a.k.a. Berkant). The song became very famous in Turkey and earned Berkant a gold record.

The next year Dutch singer David Alexandre Winter covered the same song with the title "Oh Lady Mary" and with French lyrics. It was also covered by Dalida and Paul Mauriat. This song was covered also by Italian singer Enrico Musiani as Lady Mary in Italian.
