= Berkant =

Turkish singer

- Birth name: Berkant Akgürgen
- Born: December 31, 1938; Ankara, Turkey
- Origin: Turkey
- Died: October 1, 2012 (aged 73); Istanbul, Turkey
- Genres: Anatolian rock, türkü
- Occupation(s): Singer, composer, songwriter, musician,

Berkant Akgürgen (December 31, 1938 – October 1, 2012) was a Turkish singer.

== Life ==
He was born in Ankara, Turkey on 31 December 1938 to Cahide Akgürgen. His father Hasan Akgürgen was a teacher in Hasanoğlan village institute. During his high school education in Ankara and Denizli, Berkant took piano lessons and after his compulsory military service he also learned saxophone.

== Career ==
In 1957, he began his music career as an instrument player in Ankara . In 1960, he transferred to Istanbul and in 1965 he began singing. He also released several 45 rpm records. In 1967, he sang Samanyolu, a song composed by Metin Bükey with lyrics by Teoman Alpay. The record was an unpredicted success and earned him a gold record. (This song was later on covered by Dutch singer David Alexandre Winter with French lyrics.) After this success he continued singing and also composing. He married Serpil Örümcer in 1971, but they divorced in 1972.

== Death ==
He died in Istanbul due to cancer on October 1, 2012. He was survived by his wife Engin, daughter Fatma Fulya and two sons Ovgü and Öykü.

== Legacy ==
In Mersin where he lived most of his last years, a street in Yenişehir intracity district is named after Berkant.

== Albums ==
In addition to his 44 records, he also released 3 albums:

- Ah Kızlar
- Berkant Midi LP
- Berkant Samanyolu
