= Naz Elmas =

Turkish actress (born 1983)

- Born: 16 June 1983 (age 42); Istanbul, Turkey
- Occupation: Actress
- Years active: 2002–present
- Spouses: Emre Kıramer (m. 2014; div. 2015) Erol Özmandıracı (m. 2019)

Naz Elmas (born 16 June 1983) is a Turkish actress known for her work in television, film, and theatre. Elmas first became widely known for her role in the TV drama Haziran Gecesi (2004), one of the most memorable love stories of the early 2000s. That same year she appeared on the big screen in G.O.R.A., a sci-fi comedy that turned into a huge hit and still has a loyal following. Over the years, she’s played in popular shows like Doktorlar, Filinta, and Ustura Kemal, taking on everything from modern dramas to period adventures. Alongside her television work, she continued to play at theatre.

== Biography ==
Naz Elmas was born in Istanbul on 16 June 1983. Her mother is a teacher and her father works in advertising. Her sister, Açelya Elmas, who is 6 years older than her, is also an actress. In 2001, she graduated from Özel Kalamış Lisesi and went to Yeditepe University to study theatre.

Her debut is with guest role in hit series "Gülbeyaz". In 2004, she played a lead role in Andaç Haznedaroğlu's hit series Haziran Gecesi. In the same year, she made her film debut with supporting role in the Cem Yılmaz franchise sci-fi comedy film G.O.R.A.. She joined hit medical series Doktorlar. Her period roles are in detective series Filinta and "Ustura Kemal" based from comic book.

== Filmography ==
Cinema
Year	Title	Role	Notes
2004	G.O.R.A	Secretary	
2011	Ya Sonra	Burcu	
2014	Stajyer Mafya	Canan	
Television
Year	Title	Role	Notes
2003	Gülbeyaz	Guest appearance	
2004–2006	Haziran Gecesi	Havin	
2006–2007	Candan Öte	Gülen	
2007	El Gibi	Ece	
2008–2009	Doktorlar	Eylül Soner	
2009	Nefes	Nefes	
2011	Ay Tutulması	Ayla Yılmaz	
2011	Bir Ömür Yetmez	Melek	
2012	Ustura Kemal	Angeli	
2013	Güzel Çirkin	Komiser Nazlı	
2014	Merhamet	Ahu	
2015	Filinta	Azize	
2016	Kördüğüm	Didem	
2017	Bahtiyar Ölmez	Handan	
2019	Eşkıya Dünyaya Hükümdar Olmaz	Sevda Meftun	
2020	Babam Çok Değişti	Deniz	
2022	Evlilik Hakkında Her Şey	Hande Yaman	
