= Hande Ataizi =

Turkish actress (born 1973)

- Born: Ayşe Hande Ataizi; 2 September 1973 (age 52); Bursa, Turkey
- Occupation: Actress
- Years active: 1993–present
- Spouses: Fethi Pekin (m. 2004; div. 2004) Benjamin Harvey (m. 2012; div. 2018)
- Children: 1

Ayşe Hande Ataizi (born 2 September 1973) is a Turkish actress.

== Early life ==
Her father is an architect, Mehmet Ali. Her mother is an psychology professor, Nermin Çelen.

== Career ==
Hande Ataizi began acting professionally at Yıldız Kenter's Kenter Theatre. She won the Golden Orange for Best Actress in 1996 for her performance in İrfan Tözüm's Mum Kokulu Kadınlar (Candle Scented Women). In 2012, she married the Bureau Chief for the news service Bloomberg Turkey. She played with Cem Davran in fantasy comedy series "Ruhsar" and period comedy movie "Kahpe Bizans"

== Filmography ==
Film
Year	Title	Role	Notes
1996	Mum Kokulu Kadınlar	Belkıs	
1999	Kahpe Bizans	Mağdure Bacı	
2000	Melekler Evi	Arzuhan Öztürk	
2007	Çılgın Dersane	Yıldız	
TV series
Year	Title	Role	Notes
1993	Yaz Evi	Gülçiçek	
1995	Sahte Dünyalar	Handan Karadağ	
1996	Kaldırım Çiçeği	Ayla	
1997	Bir Demet Tiyatro	Nur Seda	Guest
1997-1998	Böyle Mi Olacaktı	Gül Tanrıyar	Leading Role
1998-2001	Ruhsar	Ruhsar	Leading Role
1999	Yüzleşme	Nurgül/İnci	Leading Role
2002	Anne Babamla Evlensene	Sema	Leading Role
2002	Vaka-i Zaptiye	Bihter	Leading Role
2002	Bayanlar Baylar	Şahane	Leading Role
2003	Estağfurullah Yokuşu	Gazel	Leading Role
2004	Melekler Adası	Zinnur/Şerbet/Alev	Leading Role
2006	Sev Kardeşim	Yüksel Atak	Leading Role
2007	Kara Duvak	Süreyya/Handan	Leading Role
2008	Ece	Ece	Leading Role
2013	Altındağlı	Jale Karamanlı	Leading Role
2015–16	Hayat Mucizelere Gebe	Süheyla	Leading Role
2021–22	Camdaki Kız	Cana Yılmaz	Supporting role
2024	Taş Kağıt Makas	Süreyya Uyar	Leading Role
Programming
Year	Title	Role	Notes
1997	Hande ile Açık Açık	Herself	Presenter
2000	Hande Ataizi Şov	Herself	Presenter
2001	İki Kere Kiki	Herself	Presenter (with Cem Davran)
2005	Hande Ataizi ile En Çekici	Herself	Presenter
2006	Bunu Yayında Söyle	Herself	Presenter (with Cem Davran)
2006	Showtime	Herself	Judge
2007	Buzda Dans	Herself	Judge
2008	Eşimle Başım Dertte	Herself	Presenter (with Şafak Sezer)
2009	Yaş 15	Herself	Presenter
2010	Karışık Aile	Herself	Presenter
2011	Dest-i İzdivaç	Herself	Presenter
2011	İzdivaç	Herself	Presenter
2012	Benzemez Kimse Sana	Herself	Judge
2015	En Sevdiğim 3 Şarkı	Herself	Program / Judge
2017	Sen İşte Yeter	Herself	Presenter
2017	Hande Ataizi İle	Herself	Presenter

Programs
Year	Title	Role	Notes
1996	Beyaz Show	Guest	Episode 1
1997	Huysuz ve Tatlı Kadın	Guest	Episode 22
1997	Hülya Avşar Show	Guest	Episode 9
1998	Beyaz Show	Guest	Episode 77
2023	Bambaşka Sohbetler	Guest	Episode 249
2024	Empati	Guest	Episode 88

== Awards ==
Year	Award	Category	Work
1996	33rd Golden Orange Film Festival	Best Actress	Mum Kokulu Kadınlar
1996	Golden Boll in National Feature Film	Türkan Şoray Award	Mum Kokulu Kadınlar
1998	26th Golden Butterfly Awards	Best Actress	Ruhsar
2014	Elle Style Awards	Style Icon of the Year	
