= Engin Altan Düzyatan =

Turkish actor, model, producer and TV presenter (born 1979)

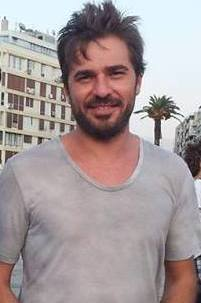
- Düzyatan in 2013
- Born: 26 July 1979 (age 47); Karşıyaka, İzmir, Turkey
- Education: Dokuz Eylül University
- Occupations: Actor; producer; TV presenter
- Years active: 1997–present
- Known for: Diriliş: Ertuğrul
- Spouse: Neslişah Alkoçlar (m. 2014)
- Children: 2
- Website: enginaltanduzyatan.com.tr

Engin Altan Düzyatan (Turkish pronunciation: [æɲˈɟin aɫˈtan dyzjaˈtan]; born 26 July 1979) is a Turkish film and television actor. Born in Karşıyaka, İzmir Province, Turkey, Düzyatan studied theatre at the Dokuz Eylül University in his home province before making his acting debut with Ruhsar (2001). He then went on to act in various roles in film and television in Turkey.

Düzyatan is known for his role as Ertuğrul Bey in Diriliş: Ertuğrul. He has been listed by The Muslim 500 since 2021.

== Early life ==
Düzyatan was born on 26 July 1979, in Karşıyaka, İzmir, Turkey, to Mevlan and Gülşen Düzyatan. Düzyatan began acting during his high school days. His family is Turkish immigrants from Yugoslavia. He joined Dokuz Eylül University to study theatre. He completed his course and moved to Istanbul where he started his professional acting career.

== Career ==
=== Early roles ===
He made his screen debut with guest roles in the hit fantasy series Ruhsar and hit series Yeditepe İstanbul, Alacakaranlık. He had leading role in youth series Koçum Benim with veteran actor Tarık Akan. In 2007, Düzyatan played in the romantic comedy series Sevgili Dünürüm with Haluk Bilginer, Sumru Yavrucuk and Nevra Serezli. In 2009, he played Doctor Serdar Batur in the series Bir Bulut Olsam with Melisa Sözen and Engin Akyürek, written by Meral Okay. After he played together in "Bir Avuç Deniz", "Son", "Kurşun", "Beyza'nın Kadınları", "Affedilmeyen" with Berrak Tüzünataç, Their crime series "Son" was sold to USA, France, Spain, Russian, Netherlands for adaptation. He played in historical series "Yol Ayrımı", "Çırağan Baskını", "Hürrem Sultan". In 2014, he appeared in the crime series Cinayet with Nurgül Yeşilçay, Uğur Polat, Şükran Ovalı, Ahmet Mümtaz Taylan and Goncagül Sunar.

In 2005, he acted in the films Beyza'nın Kadınları, with Demet Evgar directed by Mustafa Altıoklar, and Kalbin Zamanı with Hülya Avşar. His next roles were mentally disabled and cripple in the films "Cennet" (2008) with Fahriye Evcen and "Ve Panayır Köyden Gider"(2015). Düzyatan acted in the films Romantik Komedi, New York'ta Beş Minare with Haluk Bilginer and Bir Avuç Deniz in 2010. He played the sequel film "Romantik Komedi 2: Bekarlığa Veda" with Sinem Kobal. He played in airforce film Anadolu Kartalları. He played in period film "Bu Son Olsun" with Hazal Kaya and "Bu İşte Bir Yalnızlık Var" which based on novel with Özgü Namal.

He hosted the game show Canlı Para which is Turkish version of The Million Pound Drop Live on Show TV in 2010 and 2011.

=== Diriliş: Ertuğrul and later roles ===
From 2014 until 2019, Düzyatan starred in the TV series Diriliş: Ertuğrul as the eponymous character on TRT 1. Düzyatan was initially reluctant to accept the role, fearing the show would be "ridiculous". He read 13th century works such as the Book of Dede Korkut in preparation for the part. Düzyatan called Ertuğrul "a real hero", and "smart, mature and just", praising his "vision, strength, purpose in life and all of his values", and feeling his portrayal was important in providing a Turkish equivalent to Batman and Spider-Man. Düzyatan played the role of Oruç Reis Barbarossa in the Turkish TV series Barbaros: Sword of the Mediterranean in 2021.

== Public image and personal life ==
Düzyatan in 2023

On 28 August 2014, he married the granddaughter of Selim Soydan and Hülya Koçyiğit, Neslişah Alkoçlar. The couple has a son (born 2016) and a daughter (born 2018).

In 2020, Düzyatan went on a short visit to Pakistan, where Diriliş: Ertuğrul has gained popularity, accepting the invitation of a private business company. Pakistan's Make-A-Wish Foundation arranged a meeting between Düzyatan and three young terminally ill fans; when there, Engin said, "Thank you very much, I can see I inspired you and I am very happy for this love." After signing an agreement with the Lahore-based Chaudhary Group of Companies, of which he was a brand ambassador, he visited Lahore and became one of the top discussions on social media and one of his pictures with a lion went viral. Düzyatan also wishes to appear in a Pakistani drama series one day, "if it has a good story."

Two statues of Ertuğrul on horseback inspired by Düzyatan's portrayal of Ertuğrul in Diriliş: Ertuğrul were placed by a private cooperative housing society in Lahore, Pakistan in 2020. A bust of Ertuğrul was also erected in Ordu, Turkey in 2020, although it was removed by local authorities after a resemblance to Düzyatan was pointed out. Düzyatan was listed by The Muslim 500 in the "Arts & Culture" category in 2021, 2022 and 2023. Düzyatan's Diriliş: Ertuğrul co-star Nurettin Sönmez felt filming for the scene of Ertuğrul's death in Kuruluş: Osman was difficult due to Düzyatan's legacy in playing the character. Düzyatan supported the Turkish government's decision to reconvert Hagia Sophia into a mosque in 2020.

== Filmography ==
=== TV series ===
Year	Series	Role	Notes
2001	Ruhsar	Barış	Guest
2001	Bizim Otel	Altan	Guest
2001	Yeditepe İstanbul		Guest
2002–2004	Koçum Benim	Orçun	Leading role
2003	En Son Babalar Duyar		Guest
2003	Hürrem Sultan	Şehzade Bayezid	Guest
2003	Alacakaranlık	Doctor	Guest
2003	Kampüsistan	Levent	Guest
2003	Mühürlü Güller	Engin	Joined
2004	Azize	Efe	Leading role
2004	Sil Baştan	Cihan	Guest
2005	Belalı Baldız	Vedat	Guest
2005	Kadın Her Zaman Haklıdır	Pekcan	Leading role
2006	Kızlar Yurdu	Özgür	Leading role
2006	Sıla	Journalist	Guest
2007	Affedilmeyen	Orhan	Guest
2007	Sevgili Dünürüm	Murat Muhtar	Leading role
2008	Dantel	Emre	Leading role
2008	Cesaretin Var Mı Aşka?	Tamer	Leading role
2009	Bir Bulut Olsam	Doctor Serdar Batur	Leading role
2010	Kapalıçarşı	Fırat	Joined/Leading role
2010	Şen Yuva	Himself	Guest
2012	Son	Halil	Leading role
2012–2013	Yol Ayrımı	Journalist, Murat	Leading role
2014	Cinayet	Yılmaz Seyhan	Leading role
2014	Çırağan Baskını	Poldi/Mustafa	Leading role /mini series
2014–2019	Diriliş: Ertuğrul	Ertuğrul Bey	Leading role
2019	Kurşun	Prosecutor Orhan Atmaca	Leading role
2021–2022	Barbaroslar: Akdeniz'in Kılıcı	Oruç Reis	Leading role
2022–2023	Çöp Adam	Tamer Yılmaz	Leading role

=== Films ===
Key
†	Denotes films that have not yet been released

Year	Film	Role	Notes	Ref.
2005	Kalbin Zamanı	Genç Demir / Young Demir		
2005	Beyza'nın Kadınları	Koray		
2007	Cennet	Can	Debut in as lead role	
2010	New York'ta Beş Minare	Timur		
2010	Bir Avuç Deniz	Mert Akbay		
2010	Romantik Komedi	Cem Sezgin		
2011	Anadolu Kartalları	Major Kemal Tanaçan		
2012	Bu Son Olsun	Sinan		
2013	Romantik Komedi 2: Bekarlığa Veda	Cem Sezgin		
2013	Bu İşte Bir Yalnızlık Var	Mehmet		
2016	Ve Panayır Köyden Gider	Ali		
2022	Babamın Kemanı	Mehmet Mahir		
TBA	The Code †	TBA	Announced	

=== Short films ===
Key
†	Denotes films that have not yet been released

Year	Film	Role	Notes	Ref.
2008	Mezuniyet	Mezun	graduation short films	
2008	Cin Geçidi	Inspector	Short film	
2012	Dört Duvar Saraybosna	—N/a	Producer; Short film	

=== Dubbing ===
Key
†	Denotes films that have not yet been released

Year	Film	Role	Notes	Ref.
2012	Max Maceraları: Kralın Doğuşu	Gölgelerin Efendisi	Voice role	
2012	Max Maceraları 2: Krallığa Yolculuk	Gölgelerin Efendisi	Voice role	
2017	Bilal: Özgürlüğün Sesi	Bilal	Voice role	

=== Theatre ===
Year	Theatre	Director	Notes
2006	Anna Karenina	Mehmet Birkiye	Kenter Theatre
2007–2008	Kürklü Merkür	Murat Daltaban	
2012	Dar Ayakkabı ile Yaşamak	Engin Altan Düzyatan / himself	Diyarbakır State Theatre

=== Presenter ===
Year	Title	Note
2010	1 Milyon Canlı Para	TV show
2018–2019	3'te 3 Tarih	TRT 1 Competition program

== Awards and nominations ==
Year	Award Ceremony	Category	Project	Conclusion
2010	Elle Style Awards (Turkey)	Best Actor	Himself	Nominated
2012	Elle Style Awards (Turkey)	Best Actor	Son	Nominated
2012	Karsiyaka of the Year awards	Best Actor of Turkey	Himself	Won
2012	Los Angeles Movie Awards	Best Actor	A Handful of Sea	Won
2015	6th Quality Of Magazine Awards	Best Quality Actor	Resurrection: Ertugrul	Won
2015	Gazi University Awards	Best Actor	Resurrection: Ertugrul	Won
2015	Turquoise Butterfly Awards	Actor of the Year	Resurrection: Ertugrul	Won
2015	Cinema Here Festival	Young Actor Award	Resurrection: Ertugrul	Won
2016	23rd ITU EMOS Success Awards	The Most Successful Male Series Actor of the Year	Resurrection: Ertugrul	Nominated
2016	INTERNETHABER (The Best)	Best Actor	Resurrection: Ertugrul	Won
2016	Golden Sebilj Awards	Actor of the Year	Resurrection: Ertugrul	Won
2016	Internet Media Awards	Best Turkish Drama Actor of the Year	Resurrection: Ertugrul	Won
2016	16th Magazinci.com Internet Media	Male Series Actor of the Year	Resurrection: Ertugrul	Won
2016	Footed Newspaper TV Stars Awards	Best Actor in a Period Series	Resurrection: Ertugrul	Won
2016	2nd Turkey Youth Awards	Best Actor in a TV Series	Resurrection: Ertugrul	Won
2016	7th KTU Media Awards	Most Admired Actor	Resurrection: Ertugrul	Won
2016	11th Makinistanbul Media, Art and Sports Awards	Best Actor in a TV Series	Resurrection: Ertugrul	Won
2016	Aegean University 5th Media Awards	Best Actor in a TV Series	Resurrection: Ertugrul	Won
2016	4th Mimar Sinan Fine Arts High School Awards	Most Successful Actor of the Year	Resurrection: Ertugrul	Won
2016	3rd Mersin Golden Palm Awards	Male Series Actor of the Year	Resurrection: Ertugrul	Won
2016	12th Snow Film Festival Awards	Best Actor	Resurrection: Ertugrul	Won
2016	43rd Pantene Golden Butterfly Awards	The best actor	Resurrection: Ertugrul	Won
2016	Turkey Golden Palm Award	Best Actor of The Year	Resurrection: Ertugrul	Won
2017	5th Bilkent TV Awards	Best Drama Actor	Resurrection: Ertugrul	Won
2017	Green Look Short Awards	Honorable Mention Award	Resurrection: Ertugrul	Won
2017	Media Oscar Awards	Best Actor	Resurrection: Ertugrul	Won
2017	Radio Academy Awards	Special Award	Resurrection: Ertugrul	Won
2017	1st Muzikonair Awards	Best Actor in a TV Series	Resurrection: Ertugrul	Nominated
2017	13th Communication Awards	Best Actor of The Year	Resurrection: Ertugrul	Won
2017	3rd Golden Baklava Film Festival Awards	Special Award	Resurrection: Ertugrul	Won
2018	Turkey Golden Palm Awards	Best TV Series Actor	Resurrection: Ertugrul	Nominated
2018	Istanbul Kültür University (İKÜ) Career Honorary Awards	Most Favorite Male TV Series Actor of the Year	Resurrection: Ertugrul	Won
2018	16th Stars of the Year Award	Special Award	Resurrection: Ertugrul	Won
2019	Pantene Golden Butterfly Awards	Best Male Presenter	3'te 3 Tarih	Nominated
2019	Distinctive International Arab Festivals Awards (DIAFA)	Best International Actor	Resurrection: Ertugrul	Won
2019	Tax Inspectors Association Achievement Awards	The Most Successful Actor	Resurrection: Ertugrul	Won
2020	Indian Television Academy Awards (ITA)	Best International Actor	Resurrection: Ertugrul	Won
2022	SleekAsian British Awards	Best Actor	Resurrection: Ertugrul	Won
