= Dilin Döğer =

Turkish actress (born 1995)

Dilin Döğer is a Turkish actress

== Biography ==
Dilin Döğer was born on February 22, 1995 in Diyarbakır, Turkey. She grew up in Mersin and later in Ankara, where she completed her schooling. She then studied English Linguistics at Hacettepe University and received her acting training at the House of Talents Art Academy. She is fluent in Turkish, English, Kurdish, and a limited degree of French.

== Filmography ==
Movies

- Goodnight Soldier: 2022

Series

- My Ex Love: 2021
- That girl: 2022–2023
- The Conqueror of Jerusalem Saladin Ayyubi: 2023–2024
- Far city: 2024
