= Leyla Göksun =

Turkish actress (born 1983)

- Born: 19 July 1983 (age 42); Istanbul, Turkey
- Education: Yeditepe University
- Occupation: Actress
- Years active: 2006–present
- Spouses: Cemal Alpan (m. 2011; div. 2012) Mert Alacahanlı (m. 2016)

Leyla Göksun (born 19 July 1983) is a Turkish actress and former television personality known for her work in film and TV dramas. She began her professional life in modeling and advertising, and later she moved towards acting, where she got wider popularity for her role as Gönül in Kurtlar Vadisi. Later she achieved national recognition as Ela in the medical drama Doktorlar.

== Career ==
When Göksun was 14, she went to England and studied 6 years as a boarder at the International Turkish High School. In 2007, she graduated from Yeditepe University with a degree in communications. She started her career by joining the Gaye Sökmen Agency. She initially worked as a model for magazine and then played in various commercials. She portrayed a blind girl named Gönül in the Kurtlar Vadisi series. Göksun took theatre lessons at Academy Kenter. She made her cinematic debut in 2009 by appearing as Ece in the movie Dabbe 2. She joined the cast of Doktorlar as an extra, but later her breakthrough came by portraying a leading role in the same series as Ela.

== Personal life ==
In 2011, Göksun married director Cemal Alpan, but the marriage lasted for seven months. She married businessman Mert Alacahanlı in July 2016.

== Filmography ==
Film
Year	Title	Role	Notes
2009	Dabbe 2	Ece	
2014	Kırmızı	Aslı	
2015	Muna	Ela	
2015	Aşk Olsun	Sema	

Television
Year	Title	Role	Notes
2007–10	Doktorlar	Melek / Ela Altındağ	seasons 2 & 4
2008	Kurtlar Vadisi Pusu	Gönül	season 2
2010	Deli Saraylı	Leydi Betty	
2011	Kurşun Bilal	Sedef	
2012	Bir Zamanlar Osmanlı: Kıyam	Fatma Sultan	
2013	Osmanlı'da Derin Devlet	Fatma Sultan	
2013	Arka Sokaklar	Bahar	season 8
2014	Çiçek	Elif	
2015	Kalbim Ege'de Kaldı	Filiz	
2016	Şahane Damat	İlknur	
2018	Jet Sosyete	Christine	episode 10
