= Berk Cankat =

Turkish actor and graphic designer

- Born: Ömer Berk Cankat; 9 May 1984 (age 42); Ankara, Turkey
- Occupations: Actor, graphic designer
- Years active: 2013–present
- Awards: ELLE Style Awards

Berk Cankat (born 9 May 1984) is a Turkish actor and graphic designer.

== Early life ==
Berk Cankat was born on 9 May 1984 in Ankara to family of Circassian origin. Because his father worked as an architect and contractor, he spent his childhood in several cities, including Ankara, Eskişehir, and Hatay. He completed his primary education in Hatay and his secondary and high school education in Ankara, where he became involved in school theater. In 1999, he gained his first amateur theatre experience through Haldun Taner's play Ay Işığında Samata. Cankat later graduated from Bilkent University with a degree in Graphic Design from the Faculty of Fine Arts, Design and Architecture.

== Career ==
Berk Cankat was never interested in acting in college. After graduating from university, he came to Istanbul to work as a graphic designer with his close friend. He decided to become an actor after coming to Istanbul. He studied acting at the Academy 35 Buçuk Sanat Evi and began his professional career in theatre. In 2011, he starred in the plays The Seagull written by Anton Chekhov and Barut Kıvısı written by Dejan Dukovski, followed by the theatre play Merhaba Efendim written by Muzaffer İzgü in 2012. He also worked as an assistant to Civan Canova on the play Kızıl Ötesi Aydınlık, and to Vahide Perçin on Otobüs.

His first television experience was with Sana Bir Sır Vereceğim on Fox TV. In this series, he portrayed the character of "Savaş" which had fantastic powers and controlled minds with his gaze. After making a name for himself, he joined Medcezir as a guest actor and brought the character of "Cem" to life. After becoming well-known in Turkey, in summer 2014, he got his first leading role on Star TV's series Güzel Köylü, where he shared the leading role with Gizem Karaca, Mehmet Ali Nuroğlu and Ahmet Mümtaz Taylan. Despite its constant high rankings, the series concluded on 17 June 2015 at the peak of its popularity, partly due to production staff requiring a break after a year of continuous work. In January 2015, Cankat won an Elle Style Awards as Actor of the Year. However, he was one of those who did not attend the ceremony. In November 2015, he was cast on the historic series Muhteşem Yüzyıl: Kösem, produced by Tims Productions for Star TV as İskender (Alex), who is loosely based on Count Alexander of Montenegro. It was there that he once again met Ekin Koç, a co-star from Sana Bir Sır Vereceğim. In 2017, he was cast in a leading role as a pop star in Yıldızlar Şahidim opposite Özge Gürel. The following year, he starred in Gülizar and Bir Deli Rüzgar; he shared the role with Farah Zeynep Abdullah in the former, a star in Muhteşem Yüzyıl: Kösem he never met as they played their roles in two different seasons.

Berk Cankat did not act again until his return in 2022 with Aslında Özgürsün and Sıfırıncı Gün. He later starred in two more historical fiction series in 2024: Kudüs Fatihi Selahaddin Eyyubi and Atatürk; the latter served as his first film. He also appeared in the Turkish adaptation of the South Korean drama Queen of Tears, Ask ve Gözyasi. Starting May 01, 2026, he started playing in a new series that aired on tabii called P.A.Y.

== Personal life ==
Berk Cankat and Pınar Deniz began a relationship while starring in the 2018 series Bir Deli Rüzgar. They quietly ended their relationship due to undisclosed reasons around December 2019.

In mid-2023, Sinem Ünsal revealed that she and Berk Cankat were in a relationship. The two continue to share their relationship with mutual love for each other.

In addition to Turkish, his mother tongue, he is fluent in English.

== Theater ==
Theater
| Year | Play | Writer |
|---|---|---|
| 1999 | Ay Işığında Samata | Haldun Taner |
| 2011 | The Seagull | Anton Chekhov |
| 2011 | Barut Fıçısı | Dejan Dukovski |
| 2012 | Merhaba Efendim | Muzaffer İzgü |

== Filmography ==
Television
| Year | Title | Character | Role |
|---|---|---|---|
| 2013–2014 | Sana Bir Sır Vereceğim | Savaş | Supporting |
| 2014 | Medcezir | Cem | Supporting |
| 2014–2015 | Güzel Köylü | Cemal | Leading |
| 2015–2016 | Muhteşem Yüzyıl: Kösem | Alexander "Alex" / İskender | Leading |
| 2017 | Yıldızlar Şahidim | Aras | Leading |
| 2018 | Gülizar | Murat | Leading |
| 2018 | Bir Deli Rüzgar | Uğur | Leading |
| 2022–2023 | Sıfırıncı Gün | Mert | Leading |
| 2024 | Kudüs Fatihi Selahaddin Eyyubi | Bloody Bernard | Leading |
| 2025 | Ask ve Gözyasi | Ercan | Leading |
Web Series
| Year | Title | Character | Role |
| 2022 | Aslında Özgürsün | Koray | Supporting |
| 2026 | P.A.Y | - | Leading |
Films
| Year | Title | Character | Role |
| 2023-2024 | Atatürk | Ali Fuat Cebesoy | Leading |

== Awards and nominations ==
| Year | Award | Category | Work | Result |
|---|---|---|---|---|
| 2015 | ELLE Style Awards | Actor of the Year | Güzel Köylü | Won |
| 2016 | Footed Newspaper TV Stars Awards | Best Supporting Actor in a Period Drama | Muhteşem Yüzyıl: Kösem | Nominated |
| 2016 | Turkish Youth Awards | Best Supporting Actor | Muhteşem Yüzyıl: Kösem | Nominated |
