= Fırat Tanış =

Turkish actor

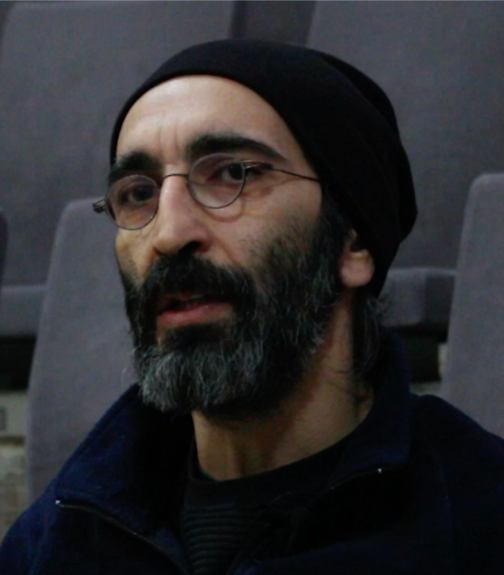
- Born: Nuri Fırat Tanış; 5 May 1975 (age 51); Istanbul, Turkey
- Occupation: Actor
- Years active: 1995–present
- Spouse(s): Gülay Sezer (divorced) Kübra Tanış (m. 2014; div. 2022)
- Children: 1

Fırat Tanış (born 5 May 1975) is a Turkish actor and musician. He has appeared in more than thirty films since 1995. He is of Turkish Meskhetian ancestry. He played as Koyu Bilal in franchise comedy film series and TV series "Geniş Aile".

== Theatre ==
- Erkek Arkadaşım Bir Feminist - 2019
- Martı - 2017
- Ayrılık - 2017
- Gelin Tanış Olalım - 2016
- E-mülteci.com - 2016
- Testosteron - 2008
- Hırçın Kız - 2006
- Barış (oyun) - 2002
- Woyzeck

== Web series ==
Year	Title	Role	Notes
2021–2022	Kulüp	Çelebi	
2022	Zeytin Ağacı	Zaman	

== TV series ==
Year	Title	Role	Notes
2001	Yeditepe İstanbul		
2004	Şeytan Ayrıntıda Gizlidir		
2005-2006	Aşka Sürgün	Resul Şahvar	
2006–2007	Ihlamurlar Altında	Nevzat	
2007	Menekşe ile Halil	Yusuf	
2009–2011	Geniş Aile	Koyu Bilal	
2012	Bir Zamanlar Osmanlı: Kıyam	Patrona Halil	
2014	Ulan İstanbul		Guest role
2017–2019	İstanbullu Gelin	Adem Boran	
2020	Arıza		Guest role
2021–2022	Aziz	Delege Pierre	
2023	Adım Farah	Mehmet Koşaner	
2024-2025	Şakir Paşa Ailesi: Mucizeler ve Skandallar	Mehmed Şakir Pasha	
2027-	Yasak Elma’s	Hüsamettin	

== Filmography ==
Year	Title	Role	Notes
2002	Sır Çocukları	Velit	
2003	Kin ve Gül		
2005	Ömer Seyfettin		
2005	Yolda:Rüzgâr Geri Getirirse		
2006	Felek Ne Demek?		
2006	Tramvay		
2007	Beyaz Melek	Musa	
2008	Dilber'in Sekiz Günü	Mehmet	
2010	Vay Arkadaş	Tik	
2011	Devrimden Sonra		
2012	Bir Zamanlar Anadolu'da	Suspect Kenan	
2012	F Tipi film		
2014	Sürgün İnek		
2014	Karınca Kapanı		
2014	Yapışık Kardeşler		
2015	Geniş Aile: Yapıştır	Koyu Bilal	
2015	Takım: Mahalle Aşkına		
2015	Öğrenci İşleri		
2015	Guruldayan Kalpler		
2016	Mavi Gece		
2016	Rus'un Oyunu		
2016	Hep Yek		
2016	Olaylar Olaylar		
2016	Somuncu Baba: Aşkın Sırrı	Meczup	
2016	Geniş Aile: Her Türlü	Koyu Bilal	
2017	Ver Kaç		
2020	9 Kere Leyla	Mahdum	
2024	Season of Love	Altan	Aşk Mevsimi
2024	Art of Love	Faysal	
