= Where's Firuze? =

Where's Firuze? (Neredesin Firuze?)
- Directed by: Ezel Akay
- Written by: Levent Kazak
- Produced by: Yonca Ertürk; Ezel Akay
- Starring: Haluk Bilginer; Özcan Deniz; Demet Akbağ
- Music by: Sunay Özgür; Ender Akay
- Distributed by: United International Pictures
- Release date: 20 February 2004
- Running time: 120 minutes
- Country: Turkey
- Language: Turkish

Where's Firuze? (Turkish: Neredesin Firuze?) is a 2004 Turkish comedy film directed by Ezel Akay and written by Levent Kazak based on a story of Özcan Deniz .

== Plot ==
Hayri and Orhan, who run the Umut Müzik label, are two unsuccessful producers and when their latest artist Hamit Hayran fails, they are left heavily in debt. They pin their hopes on a singer from the Turkish community in Germany called Ferhat Can. Ferhat enthusiastically arrives in Turkey and falls in love with a model Melek who he first sees on a billboard.

Ferhat finishes recording at the studio, but they can't release his work because they can't afford the costs. They arrange for him to appear on a talk show (hosted by Çiğdem Tunç), but he is shafted for an established singer Tanju Gürsoy. He crashes onto the stage and manages to showcase his talent. A woman Firuze who watches him on TV is impressed by him and offers to help him become a star.

When Firuze doesn't show up for many days, Hayri and his men find out at the bank that she hadn't opened the account that she promised. Ferhat goes to her home, only to find out that she is mentally ill.

Hayri and his men are forced to accept a wedding assignment from their creditor Tayyar, which turns out to be between his son and Melek. When Melih and Ferhat take the stage, Tayyar who had forbidden Melih to sing, is enraged and orders them to be killed. As they flee Tayyar's men, a food fight begins and the wedding is crashed.

Hayri and his men are left depressed by their failures. They make a suicide pact and try to commit suicide by swallowing a large amount of pills in their house. Hayri wakes up next day. He regrets that he actually didn't swallow the pills and spit them out secretly. He looks at the bodies of his friends and starts crying. However, all of his friends wake up one by one and they start laughing. Surprised to see his friends alive, Hayri proclaims that they have been reborn and announces a new start.

== Cast ==
- Haluk Bilginer - Hayri
- Özcan Deniz - Ferhat
- Demet Akbağ - Firuze
- Cem Özer - Orhan
- Ruhi Sarı - Seyfi
- Ragıp Savaş - Melih
- Şebnem Dönmez - Melek
- Uğur Uludağ - İbrahim
- Ata Demirer - Hamit Hayran
- Janset - Pacal
- Güner Özkul - Neval Hemşire
- Ahu Türkpençe - Ayşen
- Kemal Gökhan Gürses - Osman
- Rıza Sönmez - Kürşat
- Zeynep Eronat - Sansar
- Murat Akkoyunlu - Tatu
- Ezel Akay - Kaveci

=== Guest stars/cameos ===
- Ahmet Saraçoğlu - Doctor
- Ayşin Zeren - Sirin
- Bora Ayanoğlu - Tayyar
- Çiğdem Tunç - Herself
- Hasan Uzma - Gözlük
- Erol Büyükburç - Smokin Farkut
- Esin Afşar - Süreyya
- Fatih Ürek - Emre Menekşe
- Elfe Uluç - Süslü
- Gamze Gözalan - Tumbul
- Hamdi Alkan - Hoca
- Semir Aslanyürek - Kahtalı Berber
- Songül Ülkü - Alev
- Tuncay Akça - Komik Tiyatrocu
- Vural Bingöl - Kel
- Derviş Zaim - Mahsun

== Awards ==
The film won the following awards

- 16th Ankara Film Festival: Best Actress (Demet Akbağ), Best Screenplay (Mustafa Preşeva), Best Art Direction (Naz Erayda), Best Cinematography
- 12th ÇASOD Awards: Best Actress (Demet Akbağ)
- 9th Sadri Alışık Awards: Best Actor (Haluk Bilginer), Best Actress (Demet Akbağ)
- 26th SİYAD Awards: Best Actress (Demet Akbağ), Best Cinematography (Hayk Kirakosyan)

== Soundtrack album ==
Neredesin Firuze

Soundtrack album by various
- Released: 17 February 2004
- Genre: world
- Length: 67:23
- Label: Kalan
- Producer: Hasan Saltık

In February 2004, a soundtrack album was issued on the Kalan Müzik label.

=== Track listing ===
| # | Title | performed by | lyrics by | music by | time |
|---|---|---|---|---|---|
| 1 | "Gaip Arabesk (intro)" | - | - | Ender Akay | 0:55 |
| 2 | "Şarkıların Büyücüsü" | Özcan Deniz | Sunay Özgür & Ahmet Hamdi Tanpınar | Sunay Özgür | 3:49 |
| 3 | "Ya Evde Yoksan" | Haluk Bilginer & Özcan Deniz & Cem Özer & Ruhi Sarı & Ragıp Savaş | Cemal Safi | Orhan Gencebay | 3:53 |
| 4 | "Kara Sevda" | Özlem Tekin | Fuat Saka | | 3:34 |
| 5 | "Sabır" | Ciguli | Göksel | | 3:43 |
| 6 | "Beni Affet" | Özcan Deniz & Ragıp Savaş | Ahmet Hamdi Tanpınar | Sunay Özgür | 3:42 |
| 7 | "Sensiz Olmaz" | Müslüm Gürses | Bülent Ortaçgil | | 4:41 |
| 8 | "Maskeli Balo" | Ata Demirer | Murathan Mungan | Manos Loizos | 2:36 |
| 9 | "Gaip Yol" | Burcu Güneş | Eren Kazım Akay | | 3:02 |
| 10 | "İtirazım Yok" | Ata Demirer | Ata Demirer | Rıfat Şanlıel | 2:01 |
| 11 | "Gaip Arabesk (rast)" | - | - | Ender Akay | 2:29 |
| 12 | "Ahirim Sensin" | Özcan Deniz | Neşet Ertaş | | 5:00 |
| 13 | "Çizdim" | Ata Demirer | Saim Çakar | Ayaz Kaplı | 3:05 |
| 14 | "Törki Törki" | Bulutsuzluk Özlemi | Dizzy Man's Band | | 2:44 |
| 15 | "Tavla" | Ata Demirer | Fergan Mirkelam & İskender Paydaş | | 3:41 |
| 16 | "Yalnızım Dostlarım" | Ragıp Savaş & Janset | Tahir Paker | Burhan Bayar | 3:23 |
| 17 | "Aynı Cemin Bülbülüyüm" | Işın Karaca | Pir Sultan Abdal | Aşık Yaşar Tan | 3:32 |
| 18 | "İnleyen Nağmeler" | Erol Büyükburç | Zeynettin Maraş | | 4:28 |
| 19 | "Gaip Arabesk" | - | - | Ender Akay | 7:14 |
