= Gürgen Öz =

Turkish actor (born 1978)

- Born: 10 May 1978 (age 48); Zonguldak, Turkey
- Education: Istanbul University; Mimar Sinan University
- Occupation: Actor

Gürgen Öz (born 10 May 1978) is a Turkish actor.

== Life and career ==
Öz was born on 10 May 1978 in Zonguldak. After finishing his middle and high school education at the TED Zonguldak College, he moved to Istanbul to continue his studies. After studying art history at Istanbul University for a year, he enrolled in Mimar Sinan University State Conservatory to study theatre. As a student, he wrote a play titled Alman Satrancı.

After finishing his studies, he went on stage at various national and international theatre festivals. He subsequently worked for Bakırköy Municipality Theatre and State Theatres. At Bakırköy Municipality Theatre, he notably had a leading role in an adaptation of Yaşar Kemal's play Teneke.

He then started a career in TV and cinema. Between 2005 and 2007, he presented the late night show Televizyon Makinası, the first improvisational show broadcast on Turkish television. In 2008, he produced a short documentary titled Neden Böyle and his short stories were featured in various concept books. In 2013, he published his first booklet, titled Nevrotik.

He was cast in hit sitcom Avrupa Yakası and popular series Aşk Oyunu. He played in franchise films "Romantik Komedi" and surreal film "Zaman Makinesi 1973".

== Theatre ==
- Teneke : Yaşar Kemal - Bakırköy Municipality Theatre
- Kadınlar da Savaşı Yitirdi : Curzio Malaparte - Bakırköy Municipality Theatre
- Terk : Onur Bayraktar - Stüdyo Drama
- Suret : Onur Bayraktar - Stüdyo Drama

== Filmography ==
=== Film ===
- Zaman Makinesi 1973
- Plajda
- Çinliler Geliyor
- Hokkabaz
- Romantik Komedi
- Romantik Komedi 2
- Hareket Sekiz

=== TV series ===
- Kısmetim Otel
- Aşka Sürgün
- Aşk Oyunu
- Avrupa Yakası
- Melek
- Sakarya Fırat
- Aşkım Aşkım
- Başrolde Aşk
- N'olur Ayrılalım
- Bay Yanlış
- Menajerimi Ara
- Mehmed: Fetihler Sultanı

=== TV film ===
- Havva Durumu
- Kilit
