= Sedef Avcı =

Turkish model and actress

- Born: 22 January 1982 (age 44); Adana, Turkey
- Occupation: Actress
- Years active: 1997–present
- Spouse: Kıvanç Kasabalı (m. 2005)
- Children: 1

Sedef Avcı Kasabalı (née Avcı; born 22 January 1982) is a Turkish actress, model and beauty pageant titleholder.

== Biography ==
Her paternal family is from Erzincan. She is of Bosniak descent. She won Elite Model Look Turkey in 1997. She also was crowned Miss Universe Turkey 2001 and represented her country at Miss Universe 2001 in Puerto Rico.

She starred with Kıvanç Tatlıtuğ in the Turkish television series Menekşe ile Halil. She is also known for playing Bahar in the Turkish television series Ezel. She played in period series "Mazi Kalbimde Yaradır".

With Engin Altan Düzyatan, she played in Romantik Komedi, Romantik Komedi 2: Bekarlığa Veda, and Çöp Adam.

== Filmography ==
Film
Year	Film	Role
2008	Hayattan Korkma	Kardem
2009	Romantik Komedi	Esra
2013	Romantik Komedi 2	Esra
2015	Aşk Olsun	Pınar
Television
Year	Title	Role
1997	Böyle mi Olacaktı	Deniz
2005	Yanık Koza	Balım
2007	Menekşe ile Halil	Menekşe
2007, 2009	Yaprak Dökümü	Selin (Cem's sister)
2007–2008	Menekşe ile Halil	Menekşe
2009–2010	Ezel	Bahar
2010	Umut Yolcuları	Aslı
2010	Arka Sokaklar	Aslı
2011	Mazi Kalbimde Yaradır	Müjgan
2012	Esir Şehrin Gözyaşları - Bir Ferhat ile Şirin Hikayesi	Şirin
2014	Boynu Bükükler	Melek
2015	Bedel	Begüm
2017	Evlat Kokusu	Zümrüt
2017	Çember	
2018	Mehmed: Bir Cihan Fatihi	Leyla Hatun
2019	Payitaht: Abdülhamid	Zeynep
2021	Menajerimi Ara	Herself
2021–2022	Elkızı	Zeliha Bozdağlı
2022–2023	Çöp Adam	Berrin
