= Bir Zamanlar Osmanlı: Kıyam =

- Also known as: Once Upon a Time in the Ottoman Empire: Rebellion
- Created by: Ezel Akay
- Written by: Ertan Kurtulan; Hilal Yıldız; Gürsel Korat; Abdullah Akin
- Directed by: Altan Dönmez
- Starring: Türkan Şoray; Özcan Deniz; Cemal Hünal; Aslı Tandoğan; Tolga Karel; Hazım Körmükçü; Fırat Tanış; Leyla Göksun
- Composers: Aytekin G. Ataş, Fahir Atakoğlu, Soner Akalın
- Country of origin: Turkey
- Original language: Turkish
- No. of seasons: 2
- No. of episodes: 20

Production
- Producer: Herşey Film
- Running time: 60 minutes

Original release
- Network: TRT 1 TRT HD
- Release: March 12 – December 17, 2012

Bir Zamanlar Osmanlı: Kıyam (Once Upon A Time In The Ottoman Empire: Rebellion) is a Turkish historical television series about assassins, the tulip period and the Patrona Halil rebellion in the 18th-century Ottoman Empire. It was originally broadcast on Turkey's state television TRT.

== Synopsis ==
In 1711, the Ottoman Empire defeated the Russian Empire, but the Ottoman Empire then entered a period of decline. Military activities were replaced by entertainments at night. This situation upset folk people and Janissaries. Patrona Halil's brother was executed by the order of the Grand Vizier at that time. Patrona Halil became very angry. He wanted to avenge his brother.

== Cast ==
=== Main characters ===
Actor name	Role name	Explanation
Türkan Şoray	Hatice Sultan	Princess Hatice Sultan was an Ottoman princess.
Cemal Hünal	Murat	Old Janissary commander
Aslı Tandoğan	Canseza	She is an Acem Assassin.
Tolga Karel	Kasım	He is an Acem Assassin.
Hazım Körmükçü	Nevşehirli Damad Ibrahim Pasha	Grand vizier of the Ottoman Empire
Kerem Atabeyoğlu	Ahmed III	The 23rd sultan of the Ottoman Empire
Fırat Tanış	Patrona Halil	Janissary soldier who instigated the uprising
Cem Uçan	Bakan	Friend of Murat
Leyla Göksun	Fatma Sultan	was an Ottoman princess and Grand Vizier's wife.
Suat Sungur	Ibrahim Muteferrika	Ottoman typographer
Şevki Altunbüken	Spy	He is an Acem Assassin.

== International broadcasts ==
Country	Network
Northern Cyprus	TRT 1
United Arab Emirates	Dubai TV
Lebanon	Future TV
Morocco	Medi1 TV
Albania	Tring 3 Plus
Romania	Național TV
Serbia	TV Novi Pazar
