= Ragıp Savaş =

Turkish actor

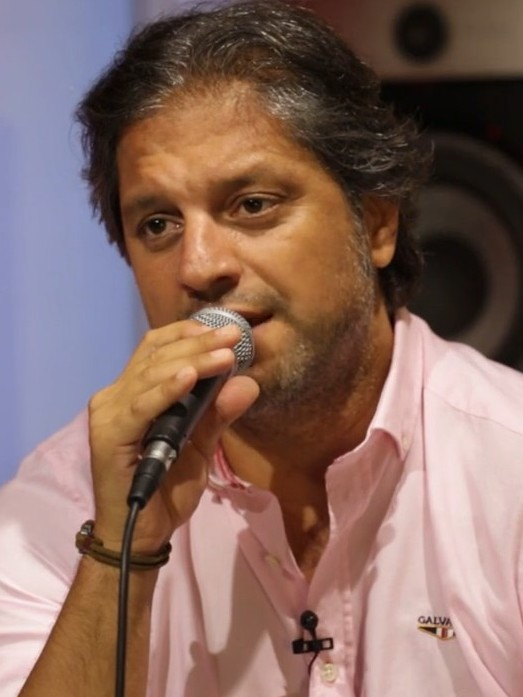
- Ragıp Savaş in 2013
- Occupations: Sportsman (formerly), actor
- Years active: 1990–present
- Spouse: Fadime Sezer Savaş (m. 2005)
- Children: 1

Ragıp Savaş is a Turkish actor, singer and former sportsman known for his work on Valley of the Wolves: Ambush (2007), Where's Firuze? (2004) and Kuruluş: Osman (2019–2021).

== Biography ==
Ragıp Savaş was born in İzmit, Turkey on 24 October 1966. Later, in 1972–1977, he attended İsmet İnönü Elementary School. He attended Central Secondary School from 1977 to 1980 and from 1980 to 1983, he studied at Izmit High School and graduated from there. In 1983, he continued his volleyball life as an amateur in Izmit and started to continue his professional life as a transfer to Eczacıbaşı Sports Club.

In 1986, he entered the Theatre Department of Mimar Sinan University State Conservatory. He graduated with a high degree in 1990 and he started his professional art life in Bakirkoy Municipal Theatres.

His first play was the Ship of Democracy, directed by Ahmet Gülhan, written by Aziz Nesin in 1990. He played 'Petrof' in the play and the play was awarded 5 awards at the International Istanbul Theatre Festival. Ragıp Savaş has been in many plays and musicals at Bakirkoy Municipal Theatres ever since.

Between 1998 and 2002, he was deputy general artistic director (Müşfik Kenter) and a member of the Board of Directors at Bakirkoy Municipal Theatres. In 2004, he was appointed acting General Art Director of Kocaeli Metropolitan Municipal City Theatre and still continues this role.

In 2004, he began his film career with the film Where's Firuze? He also has a role in various TV shows. In 2007, he became famous for his series, Valley of the Wolves: Ambush.

Ragıp Savaş, who has starred in many films and TV shows so far, also starred in the cast of The Untitled series, which came to screens in 2017, and currently works in Kuruluş: Osman, as Dündar Bey.

=== Personal life ===
He married Fadime Savaş on 25 September 2005. Together, they have a daughter, Nil Savaş.

== Theatre ==
- Cıngıllı (Oyuncu, 2017)
- Sokak Kızı İrma (Metin & Çetin, 2013)
- Yıldızların Altında (Oyuncu, 2005)
- İvan İvanoviç Var Mıydı Yok Muydu? (Petrof, 1990)

== Filmography ==
=== Television ===
- Ben Bu Cihana Sığmazam (Atakan, 2022)
- Eşkıya Dünyaya Hükümdar Olmaz (Aziz, 2021)
- Kuruluş: Osman (Dündar Bey, 2019–2021)
- İsimsizler (Savcı Zeki, 2017)
- Ölene Kadar (Mehmet, 2016)
- Muhteşem Yüzyıl: Kösem (2015)
- Hayatımın Rolü (2012)
- Tek Başımıza (Ufuk, 2011)
- Canan (Mahir, 2011–2012)
- Kirli Beyaz (Deniz, 2010)
- Sen Harikasın (Cüneyt, 2008–2011)
- Kurtlar Vadisi Pusu (Fuat Tamer Tataroğlu, 2007–2008)
- Zümrüt (Oğuz, 2004)
- Dişi Kuş (2004)
- Yangın Ayşe (Yanık Ömer, 1997)
- Şişeler (1993)
- Eda Hanım (1992)

=== Films ===
- Ya Sonra (Ali, 2011)
- Türkan (Çınar, 2011)
- Çınar Ağacı (Murat, 2010)
- Herkes mi Aldatır? (Hakan, 2010)
- Son Osmanlı Yandım Ali (Recep Yüzbaşı, 2006)
- Polis (Komser Yılmaz, 2006)
- Hacivat Karagöz Neden Öldürüldü? (Orhan Gazi, 2005)
- Neredesin Firuze (Melih, 2003)
