= Aslı Bekiroğlu =

Turkish actress

- Born: 16 November 1995 (age 30); Istanbul, Turkey
- Occupation: Actress
- Years active: 2013–present

Aslı Bekiroğlu (born 16 November 1995) is a Turkish actress.

Bekiroğlu is a graduate of Bahçeşehir University with a degree in nutrition and dietetic studies. Between 2006 and 2011, she was a student at Istanbul University State Conservatory, learning harp and solfège. After a brief appearance in Beni Böyle Sev in 2013, she made her actual debut in 2015 with a role in the series Adı Mutluluk. She was cast in her first leading role in the TV series Gülümse Yeter. In 2016, she made her cinematic debut with a role in İkimizin Yerine. The next year, she appeared in a supporting role in the comedy movie Yol Arkadaşım. Between 2018 and 2019, she was a regular on the sitcom Jet Sosyete.

== Filmography ==
Television
Year	Title	Role	Notes
2013	Beni Böyle Sev	Ayça	Supporting role
2015	Adı Mutluluk	Sera Yüksel	Supporting role
2016	Gülümse Yeter	Yasemin	Leading role
2018	Dudullu Postası	Betül	Supporting role
2018–2019	Jet Sosyete	Melike Şahin	Supporting role
2019	Benim Tatlı Yalanım	Suna Doğan Yılmaz	Leading role
2020	Jet Sosyete	Melike Şahin	Guest appearance
2021	Yetiş Zeynep	Zeynep	Leading role
2022	Maske Kimsin Sen?	Self	Competitor; 2nd, 4th, 6th, 7th, 8th and 9th episode

Film
Year	Title	Role	Notes
2016	İkimizin Yerine	Ceylan	Supporting role
2017	Yol Arkadaşım	Bahar	Leading role
2021	Aşkım Bahardı	Bahar	Leading role
2022	Sen ve Ben	Müjde	Leading role
2022	Bandırma Füze Kulübü	Zehra	Leading role
2022	Sonsuza Dek Nedime	Cemre	Leading role
2023	Sahte Balayı	Didem	Leading role
2024	Biricik Sevgilim	Nihan	Leading role
2024	Hayatımız Roman	Öykü	Leading role
2024	Gecenin Nakaratı	İlknur	Leading role
2024	Veda Partisi	Mehtap	Leading role
2024	Mendebur		Leading role
Coming soon	Stalker	Sezen	Leading role

== Awards ==
- 45th Golden Butterfly Awards: Shining Star Award
