= Aydan Şener =

Turkish actress and model

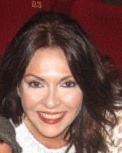
- Born: Memnune Aydan Şener; 1 March 1963 (age 63); Kilis, Turkey
- Occupation: Actress

Memnune Aydan Şener (born 1 March 1963) is a Turkish actress, model and beauty pageant titleholder who won Miss Turkey 1981 and represented her country at Miss World 1981 but unplaced. She is of Tatar origin.

== Biography ==
She was born in Kilis, a town in south-central Turkey, in 1963. Her aunt is actress Suzan Avcı. She moved to Bursa in her early childhood along with her family. She completed her secondary and high school education in Bursa. She was elected Miss Turkey in 1981 and represented Turkey at the Miss World beauty pageant in the same year. Having worked as a model for a short while, she started her acting career with the mini period series "Küçük Ağa" based from novel in 1983. With Tolga Savacı, She played in Fatih Harbiye, Samanyolu based from novels and "Gölge Çiçeği" for third times. She played in mini period series Çalıkuşu based on classic novel and series "Yeniden Doğmak" about Turk emigration in Bulgaria.

== Filmography ==
=== Films ===
Title	Year	Role	Notes
Utanç Yılları	1987		Film
Ay Işığında Saklıdır	1996		Film
Bir Aşkın Bittiği Yer	1996		Film
Yüzleşme	1996		Film
Ah Nalan Ah	1997		Film
Nice Yıllardan Sonra	1997		Film
Sakin Kasabanın Kadını	1997		Film
Güvercin	1999		Film
Aşk Aynı Adreste	2000		Film
Kumru	2000		Film
Yarın Geç Olmayacak	2000		Film
Oyun	2001		Film
Ankara Yollarında	2002		Film
Beni Bekledinse	2004		Film

=== TV Series ===
Title	Year	Role	Notes
Bay Alkol'ü Taktimimdir	1981		TV series
Küçük Ağa	1983		TV series
Çalıkuşu	1986	Feride	TV series
Yeniden Doğmak	1987		TV series
Samanyolu	1987		TV series
Fatih-Harbiye	1990		TV series
Yol Palas Cinayeti	1991		TV series
İki Kız Kardeş	1992		TV series
Hayatın İçinden	1993		TV series
Sevgi Oyunu	1994		TV series
Gül ve Diken	1995		TV series
Gölge Çiçeği	1995		TV series
Zühre	1996		TV series
Tutku	1996		TV series
Nefes Alamıyorum	1996		TV series
Hüznün Yüzü	1997		TV series
Hicran	1999		TV series
Öyle Bir Sevda ki	2002		TV series
Mühürlü Güller	2003		TV series
Masum Değiliz	2005		TV series
Evimin Erkeği	2007		TV series
Fikrimin İnce Gülü	2007		TV series
Sürgün Hayatlar	2008		TV series
Kırmızı Işık	2008		TV series
Yıllar Sonra	2011		TV series
Hekimler	2013		TV series
Kalbimdeki Deniz	2016		TV series
Menajerimi Ara	2021	Herself	TV series

Awards
Preceded by Fahriye Funda Ayloğlu	Miss Turkey; 1981	Succeeded by Ayşe Belgin Güven
