= Berna Laçin =

Turkish actress (born 1970)

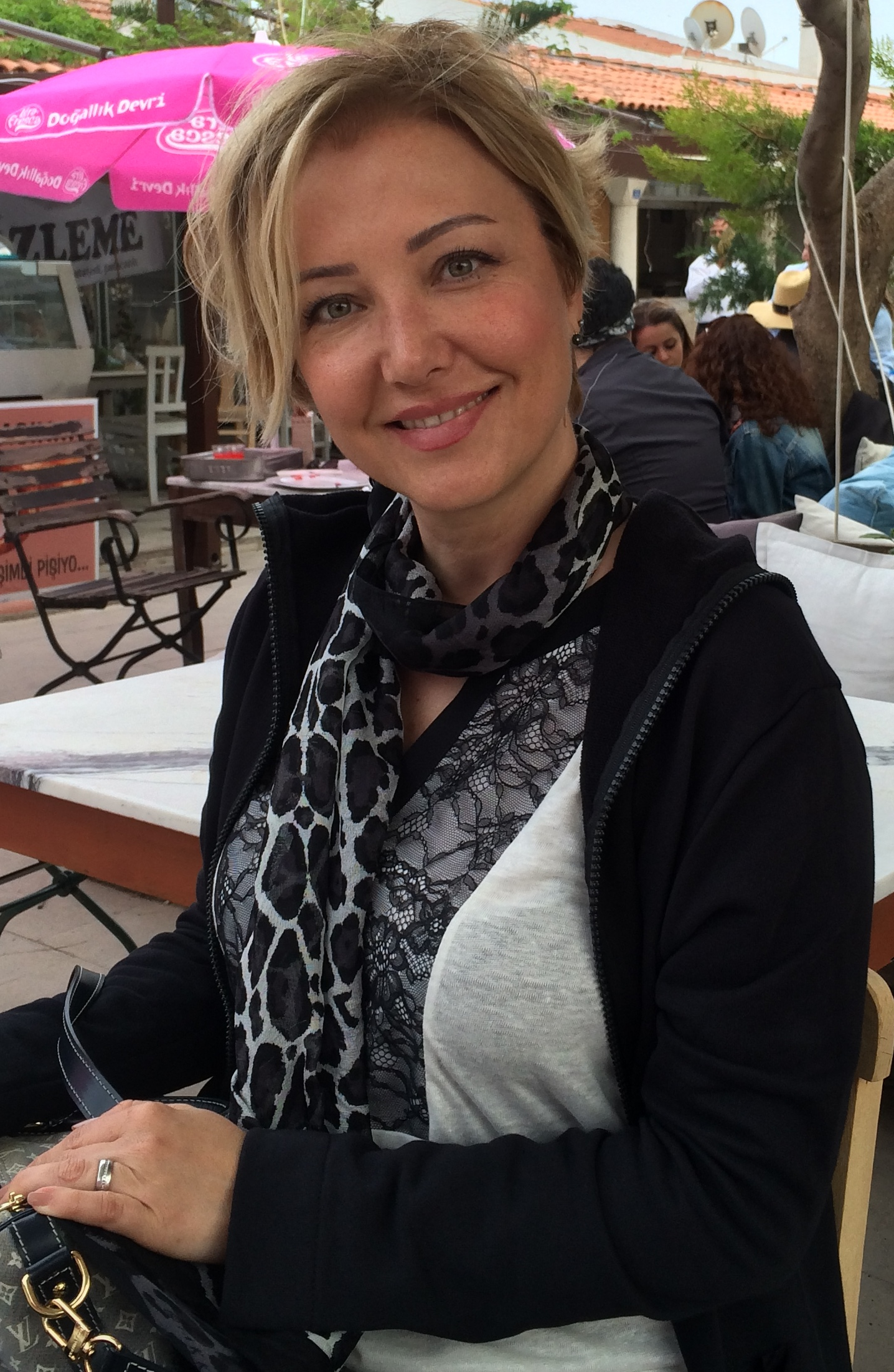
- Laçin in April 2016
- Born: 20 August 1970 (age 55); Karşıyaka, Turkey
- Occupations: Actress, TV presenter
- Years active: 1990–present
- Spouse: Tolga Eşiz (m. 1996)
- Children: 1

Berna Laçin (born 20 August 1970) is a Turkish actress and TV presenter. She is best known for popular rom-com Evdeki Yabancı and Belalı Baldız adaptation of Hope & Faith

== Biography ==
His father is a war pilot. A graduate of Istanbul State Conservatory with a degree in theatre studies. She has also been cast in four different movies. In her first film Koltuk Belası, she worked with iconic actors Kemal Sunal, Kartal Tibet. Laçin has appeared in various TV series such as Gökkuşağı, Böyle mi Olacaktı, Ateş Dansı.

Aside from her acting career, Laçin has also worked as a presenter, most notably in 2009 when she hosted the 31st International April 23 National Sovereignty and Children's Day Program. She occasionally presented daily programs, including Her Şey İçin Berna Laçin on ATV in 2010.

== Filmography ==
Year	Title	Role	Notes
1990	Koltuk Belası	Hülya Kaya	
1993	Kızılırmak Karakoyun	Hatice	
1995	Bir Kadının Anatomisi		
2019	Merhaba Güzel Vatanım		

=== TV Series ===
Year	Title	Role
1990	Sevdiğim Adam	Defne
1991	Yarına Gülümsemek	
1995	Gökkuşağı	
1995	Sahte Dünyalar	Aysel
1997	İlk Aşk	Begüm
1997	Böyle mi Olacaktı	Dr. Pervin Tuna
1998	Ateş Dansı	Handan
2000	Evdeki Yabancı	Aslı
2002	Seni Yaşatacağım	Dr. Zeynep
2004	Bir Dilim Aşk	Nehir
2005	Belalı Baldız	Dilek
2007	Yıldızlar Savaşı	Yıldız Aslan
2013–2014	Aşk Ekmek Hayaller	Leyla Değirmencioğlu

=== Programme ===
Year	Title	Role	Notes
2022	Maske Kimsin Sen?		Show

== Theatre ==
- The Decorator : Donald Churchill - Tiyatro Martı - 2014
- Couple en turbulences : Éric Assous - Tiyatro İstanbul - 2007
- Chapter Two : Neil Simon - Tiyatro İstanbul - 1997
- La Pelle : Curzio Malaparte - Istanbul City Theatre
- Teope : Çoşkun Büktel - Istanbul City Theatre
- Gözlerimi Kaparım Vazifemi Yaparım : Haldun Taner - Istanbul City Theatre
- Aile Şerefi
