= Cemal Hünal =

Turkish actor (born 1976)

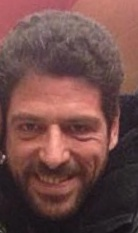
- Born: 2 October 1976 (age 49); Istanbul, Turkey
- Occupation: Actor
- Years active: 2007–present
- Spouse: Lale Cangal (m. 2011; div. 2024)
- Children: 1

Cemal Hünal (born 2 October 1976) is a Turkish actor.

He studied at Saint Benoit French High School and went on to study theatre and acting at Santa Monica College, UCLA and London Film School.

His breakthrough role is Kerim in hit series "Asi". He had a leading role in the historical series Bir Zamanlar Osmanlı: Kıyam alongside Aslı Tandoğan.

In late 2010s, he acted in franchise films Romantik Komedi, Romantik Komedi 2: Bekarlığa Veda and also in Çağan Irmak's films Ulak and Issız Adam alongside Melis Birkan.

On 25 January 2013, 30 Turkish actors, including Cemal Hünal, were taken into custody for a drugs probe by Istanbul's narcotics police.

== Filmography ==
=== TV series ===
- Asi (2007–2009) - Kerim
- Kış Masalı (2009) - Ali Murat
- Adanalı (2010) - Alex
- Seni Bana Yazmışlar (2011) - Yalçın
- Bir Zamanlar Osmanlı: Kıyam (2012) - Murat
- Osmanlı Tokadı (2013) - Moğol
- Tatar Ramazan (2013) - Rüstem Sinan
- Paramparça (2014) - Alper
- Diriliş: Ertuğrul (2017) - Tekfur Ares / Ahmet Alp
- Tozkoparan (2019) - Celal Hoca
- Sadakatsiz (2021) - Sinan
- Bozkır Arslanı Celaleddin (2021)
- Maske Kimsin Sen? (2022)
- Camdaki Kız (2022–2023) - Emir
- Hudutsuz Sevda (2023) - Kaya Marten

=== Film ===
- Ulak : Çağan Irmak - (2007) - Ulak İbrahim
- Issız Adam : Çağan Irmak - (2008) - Alper
- Peşpeşe - (2010) - Bora
- Romantik Komedi (2010) - Mert
- Ayaz (2012) - Şahin
- Kaos Örümcek Ağı (2012) - Mansur
- Romantik Komedi 2: Bekarlığa Veda (2013) - Mert
- Günce (2013) - Cengiz
- Kırmızı (2015) - Umut
- Atçalı Kel Mehmet (2017)
- Sinyalciler: Son Akşam Yemeği (2017)
- Kızım Ve Ben (2018)
- Türkler Geliyor: Adaletin Kılıcı (2020)
- Yanlış Anlama 2 (2022)
- Alaboraşk (2022)
- İşin Aslı (2022) - Onur
- Zevcat (2022)
- Son Akşam Yemeği (2023) - Commander Wilson
