= Sinem Kobal =

Turkish actress (born 1987)

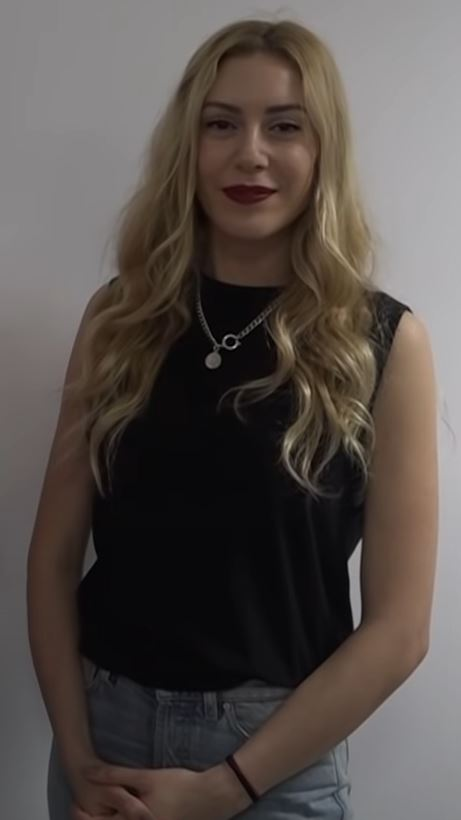
- Born: 14 August 1987 (age 38); Istanbul, Turkey
- Occupation: Actress
- Years active: 2001–present
- Spouse: Kenan İmirzalıoğlu (m. 2016)
- Children: 2

Sinem Kobal (born 14 August 1987) is a Turkish television and film actress.

== Career ==
At the age of thirteen, She started her acting career in the sitcom Dadı which adaptation of "The Nanny" as Dilara Giritli. She had lead role in fantasy child series Selena for 104 episodes. She played in popular youth series Lise Defteri and Küçük Sırlar Turkish version of Gossip girl.

She starred in films Romantik Komedi, and Romantik Komedi 2: Bekarlığa Veda with Engin Altan Düzyatan. She played in series Gönül İşleri and Analar ve Anneler.

She has appeared in many television commercials in Turkey, including Gencturkcell and Bingo.

== Personal life ==
Kobal's father was a civil engineer. Both of her parents are from Pazar, Rize. She has a brother named Kerem. At the age of four years, Sinem Kobal began her ballet training and continued for eight years. Kobal was a successful student and played volleyball, winning second prize in a competition. In addition, she won the first prize in a step aerobics competition. She received her high school diploma from the Royal Academy. She later studied Art Management and Performing Arts at Beykent University.

Kobal began dating Turkish footballer Arda Turan, who was playing for Galatasaray S.K. at that time and the Turkish national team as a left winger, in August 2009. They got engaged in January 2010 and split up in late 2013. Her ex-boyfriend is İbrahim Çelikkol. On 14 May 2016, she married actor Kenan İmirzalıoğlu. The couple's first child, a daughter named Lalin, was born in October 2020. Their second daughter, named Leyla, was born in May 2022.

== Filmography ==
Tv Series
Title	Role	Year	Note
Dadı	Dilara	2001	
Lise Defteri	İnci	2003	joined
Nefes Nefese	Aslı	2005	
Belalı Baldız		2006	guest
Arka Sokaklar		2006	guest
Selena	Selena	2006	
Küçük Sırlar	Su Mabeynci	2010	
Mor Menekşeler		2011	guest
Gönül İşleri	Sevda	2014	
Analar ve Anneler	Zeliha	2015	
Yüz Yüze	Seliha	2017	
Web Series
Title	Role	Year	Note
Hürrem Sultan	Ayşe	2003	guest
Karşılaşmalar		2024	guest
Film
Title	Role	Year	Note
Okul	Şebnem	2004	
Dünyayı Kurtaran Adamın Oğlu	Bianca	2006	
Ayakta Kal	Yasemin	2008	
Romantik Komedi	Didem	2010	
Romantik Komedi 2: Bekarlığa Veda	Didem	2013	
Yaktın Beni		2015	

=== Host ===
- Şahane Pazar
