= Ekin Türkmen =

Turkish actress

- Born: 22 August 1984 (age 41); İzmir, Turkey
- Occupation: Actress
- Years active: 2002–present

Ekin Türkmen (born 22 August 1984) is a Turkish actress. She is best known for starring in TV series, including hit series Küçük Kadınlar, Acı Hayat, Menekşe ile Halil, Ekmek Teknesi and Adanalı. With Ertan Saban, she played in series "Karakol", "Bir Kadın Tanıdım", "Hatasız Kul Olmaz". She was cast in Turkish Air Force film Anadolu Kartalları.

== Filmography ==
=== Film ===
Film
Year	Title	Role	
2005	Keloğlan Kara Prens'e Karşı	Cinderella	
2006	Son Ders: Aşk ve Üniversite	Deren	
2011	Anadolu Kartalları	Özlem	
2017	New York Masalı	Selin	
2017	Benzersiz	Asu	
2018	Organize İşler: Sazan Sarmalı	Ecem	
Streaming platforms
Year	Title	Role	Network
2017	Son Destan	Selvi	5 episodes (1–5)
2021	Leyla ile Mecnun	Sevil	Exxen
Television
Year	Title	Role	Notes
2002	Ekmek Teknesi	Songül	106 episodes (1–106)
2005	Acı Hayat	Özlem	59 episodes (1–59)
2005	Nefes Nefese	Binnur	
2007	Kısmetim Otel	Serra	6 episodes
2007–2008	Menekşe ile Halil	Zeynep	36 episodes (1–36)
2008-2009	Küçük Kadınlar	Elif	52 episodes (1–52)
2010	Adanalı	Pamuk	9 episodes (71–79)
2011	Karakol	Songül	6 episodes
2011–2012	Bir Kadın Tanıdım	Bahar Selimoğlu/Leyla Gençoğlu	20 episodes
2013	Aşk Emek İster	Deniz	
2014	Hatasız Kul Olmaz	Oya	
2015	Racon: Ailem İçin	Zerrin Saydın	4 episodes
2020	Ramo	Meryem	

== Theatre ==
Theatre
Year	Title	Notes
2007	Denial	Arnold Wesker; Hasan Şahintürk
2011	Dalga	Reinhold Tritt; Şakir Gürzumar
