= Romantic Comedy (2010 film) =

- Theatrical release poster
- Directed by: Ketche
- Written by: Ceren Aslan; Aslı Zengin
- Produced by: Murat Tokat
- Starring: Sedef Avcı; Sinem Kobal; Burcu Kara; Cemal Hünal; Engin Altan; Begüm Kütük; Gürgen Öz
- Cinematography: James Gucciardo
- Music by: Yıldıray Gürgen
- Release date: 5 February 2010
- Running time: 109 minutes
- Country: Turkey
- Language: Turkish
- Box office: $3,974,799

Romantic Comedy (Turkish: Romantik Komedi) is a 2010 Turkish romantic comedy film, directed by Ketche, about three close friends who live very different lives. The film, which went on nationwide general release across Turkey on 5 February 2010, was one of the highest grossing Turkish films of 2010.

== Production ==
The film was shot on location in Istanbul, Turkey.

== Plot ==
Esra, Didem and Zeynep are three close friends who live together, but have very different lives, When Zeynep gets married, Esra decides to get away from her job and begin a new life. She gets a job at an advertising company. She becomes interested in the company's Creative Director Mert, while Didem becomes interested in Mert's close friend Cem, who is an actor.

== Cast ==
- Sedef Avcı as Esra
- Sinem Kobal as Didem
- Burcu Kara as Zeynep
- Cemal Hünal as Mert
- Engin Altan as Cem
- Begüm Kütük as Ece
- Gürgen Öz as Yiğit

== Release ==
The film opened across Turkey on 5 February 2010 at number one in the Turkish box office chart with an opening weekend gross of $923,576.

== Reception ==
The film has made a total gross of $3,974,799.
