= And Then What? =

- Theatrical Poster
- Directed by: Özcan Deniz
- Written by: Özcan Deniz; Murat Gürvardar
- Produced by: Ercan Deniz; Sinan Tekin; Vural Turunç
- Starring: Deniz Çakır; Özcan Deniz; Barış Falay; Ragıp Savaş
- Cinematography: Altan Dönmez
- Edited by: Arzu Volkan
- Music by: Deniz Çakır; Sezen Aksu; Özcan Deniz; Yıldıray Gürgen
- Production companies: Warner Bros.; Renkli Filmler; DNZ Film; Demtaş
- Distributed by: Warner Bros.
- Release date: February 25, 2011
- Running time: 105 minutes
- Country: Turkey
- Language: Turkish
- Budget: US$5,000,000
- Box office: US$4,711,624

And Then What? (Turkish: Ya Sonra?) is a 2011 Turkish romantic comedy film, written and directed by Özcan Deniz, starring Deniz Çakır as an unhappily married woman who attempts to restart her long dormant career. The film, which opened on February 25, 2011 at number 2 in the Turkish box office, is one of the highest grossing Turkish films of 2011.

== Production ==
The film was shot on location in Istanbul and Antalya, Turkey.

== Synopsis ==
Married couple Adem and Didem have been married for seven years and their relationship has started to wear out, turning Didem into an unhappy woman as Adem starts showing his love for Didem less and less each day. The only way out for Didem is to return to her career, which she abandoned years ago for the sake of her marriage. In return for her great sacrifice, Didem wants to see the same selflessness from Adem, whom she still loves with all her heart. However her plans change when the knight of a completely different fairytale comes knocking on her door.

== Release ==
The film opened on nationwide general release in 377 screens across Turkey on February 25, 2011 at number 1 in the national box office with a first weekend gross of US$1,265,409.

== See also ==
- Turkish films of 2011
- 2011 in film
