= Özcan Deniz =

Turkish actor, singer, composer, writer and director

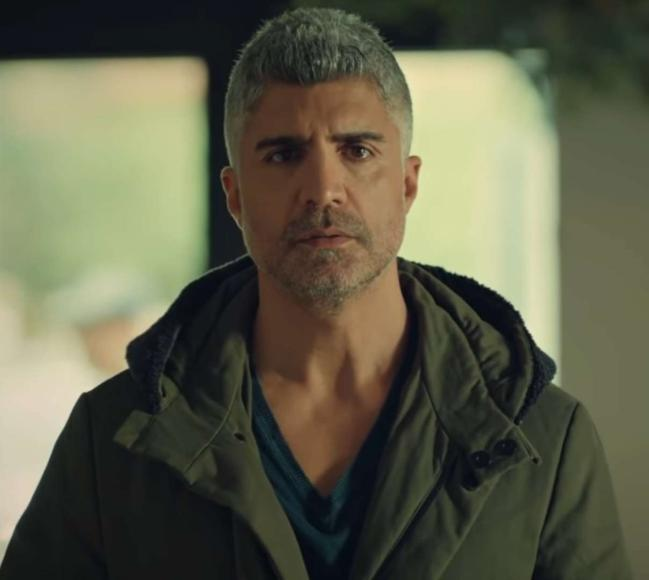
- Deniz in 2024
- Born: 19 May 1972 (age 54); Ankara, Turkey
- Occupations: Actor, singer, composer, director, writer
- Years active: 1992–present
- Spouses: Handan Deniz (m. 1992; div. 2003) Feyza Aktan (m. 2018; div. 2019) Samar Dadgar (m. 2023)
- Musical career
- Genres: Pop, folk
- Label: Deniz Production
- Website: ozcandeniz.com

Özcan Deniz (born 19 May 1972) is a Turkish actor, singer, composer, writer and director of Kurdish descent.

== Life ==
His family is of Kurdish origin. Deniz's family is originally from Ağrı but he was born in Ankara and grew up in Aydın. He is the nephew of a famous traditional Kurdish singer named Şakiro. He started acting during his highschool years itself in theater plays, which he wrote himself and attended local amateur theater clubs. He performed his first orchestra work in 1985 in Aydın. In 1988 he moved to Istanbul and in 1989 to Germany to pursue a music career. He was discovered by a group of producers in Munich, Germany. Deniz‘ debut album Ağlattın Beni was released in 1992. With the album Meleğim released in 1993, he became well known. In 1994, he released his album Beyaz Kelebeğim. In 1994, he acted in the film 'Ona Sevdiğimi Söyle' directed by Memduh Ün. After his military service he released another album called Yalan mı in 1997 and started acting in the TV series Yalan mı in the same year. In 1999, he starred in another TV series called Aşkın Dağlarda Gezer which he wrote himself too. Although he came to the fore with the news that he and Şebnem Schaefer were dating in 2022, Schaefer denied these allegations from the beginning. He had the leading roles in the very popular TV series Asmalı Konak and Haziran Gecesi. Deniz both directed and wrote the screenplay for the film Ya Sonra? in 2011.

== Discography ==
=== Albums ===
- Yine Ağlattın Beni (1992, Prestij Müzik)
- Hadi Hadi Meleğim (1993, Prestij Müzik)
- Beyaz Kelebeğim (1994, Prestij Müzik)
- Yalan Mı? (1997, Prestij Müzik)
- Çoban Yıldızı (1998, Prestij Müzik)
- Aslan Gibi (2000, Prestij Müzik)
- Leyla (2002, Popüler Müzik)
- Ses ve Ayrılık (2004, Deniz-Spotek Production)
- Hediye (2007, Doğan Music Company)
- Sevdazede (2009, Avrupa Müzik)
- Bi Düşün (2012, Poll Production)

=== Singles ===
- "Her Şey Değişir" (with Pamela and Fuat) (2009, Pasaj Müzik)
- "Merakımdan" (2012, Poll Production)
- "Aşk" (2019, DNZ Production)
- "Allah Büyük" (2020, DNZ Production)
- "Ben Yine Kendimle" (2020, DNZ Production)
- "Ayrıntılarda Gizli" (2020, DNZ Production)
- "Arabesk" (2025, Medya Prodüksiyon)
- "Bu Defa Başka" (2025, Medya Prodüksiyon)

== Filmography ==
Movies
Year	Title	Role
1994	Ona Sevdiğimi Söyle	
1996	Yer Çekimli Aşklar	Cemal
2002	Kolay Para	Cevher Yıldız
2003	O Şimdi Asker	Yüzbaşı Volkan
2003	Asmalı Konak: Hayat	Seymen Karadağ
2004	Neredesin Firuze?	Ferhat Can
2006	Keloğlan Kara Prens'e Karşı	Kara Prens
2008	Sarıkamış Beyaz Hüzün	Teğmen Faik
2008	Mevlana Celaleddin-i Rumi: Aşkın Dansı	Çelebi Hüsamettin
2011	Ya Sonra?	Adem
2012	Araf	Mahur
2012	Evim Sensin	İskender
2013	Su ve Ateş	Haşmet
2015	Sevimli Tehlikeli	Director-writer
2016	Her Şey Aşktan	Medium Kado
2016	İkinci Şans	Cemal
2017	Öteki Taraf	Çetin
TV series
Year	Title	Role
1997	Yalan	Hasan
1999	Aşkın Dağlarda Gezer	Zal
2002–2003	Asmalı Konak	Seymen Karadağ
2004–2006	Haziran Gecesi	Baran Aydın
2007	Kader	Ali Asyalı
2008	Aşk Yakar	Mustafa
2010	Samanyolu	Nejat
2012	Bir Zamanlar Osmanlı: Kıyam	Serhat
2013–2014	Karagül	Murat Şamverdi
2014–2015	Kaderimin Yazıldığı Gün	Kahraman Yörükhan
2017–2019	İstanbullu Gelin	Faruk Boran
2021	Seni Çok Bekledim	Kadir
2023	Kızıl Goncalar	Dr. Levent Alkanlı
TV programs
Year	Title	Channel
1998	Deniz Show	Star TV
2007	İki Renk	TRT 1
