= Belalı Baldız =

Television series

Belalı Baldız is the Turkish remake of the American sitcom Hope & Faith. The sitcom was produced by Med Productions. It was released in 2005 and aired on ATV Turkey.

The show would also air in the Netherlands on RTL 5, with Dutch voice-overs.

The stars of the sitcom were Berna Laçin, Nurgül Yeşilçay and Kenan Işık. Sedef Şahin, Cemre Özer and Raffaelle Çedolini played the roles of the children in the family.
