= Hilal Altınbilek =

Turkish actress and model (born 1991)

- Altınbilek in 2020
- Born: 11 February 1991 (age 35); İzmir, Turkey
- Education: Ege University (business economics)
- Occupations: Actress; model
- Years active: 2011–present
- Known for: Bir Zamanlar Çukurova
- Height: 1.73 m (5 ft 8 in)

Hilal Altınbilek (born 11 February 1991) is a Turkish actress and model. She is most famous for her role as Züleyha Altun in the TV series Bir Zamanlar Çukurova (2018–2022).

== Biography ==
Hilal Altınbilek was born on 11 February 1991, in İzmir (Turkey), to a mother of CroatianTurkish origin and a father of Kosovar Turk origin, Özdemir Altınbilek. She has been interested in theater and acting since elementary school.

== Career ==
=== Education ===
Hilal Altınbilek while attending elementary school started acting in theater, with lessons given by Ali Haydar Elçığ at the Contemporary Drama Ensemble in İzmir. After her high school studies, she enrolled at the faculty of business economics at the Ege University, where a few years later she obtained her degree and at the same time she followed various courses and theater workshops, also participating in performances.

Later she participated in a beauty contest, where she managed to get a degree by attracting the attention of various producers. In 2009 and 2010 she studied acting at the Müjdat Gezen Art Center (MSM) Actor Studio in Istanbul.

=== Acting career ===
Hilal Altınbilek in 2011 she made her first appearance as an actress with the role of İrem in the daily Fox series Derin Sular. From 2013 to 2016 she was cast as Özlem Şamverdi in the Fox series Black Rose (Karagül). In 2016 she played the role of Nil in the Kanal D series Hayatımın Aşkı.

In 2018 he played the role of Yeşim in the film Çocuklar Sana Emanet directed by Çağan Irmak. From 2018 to 2022 she was chosen to play the lead role Züleyha Altun in the ATV series Bir Zamanlar Çukurova and where she acted alongside actors such as Uğur Güneş, Murat Ünalmış, Vahide Perçin, Kerem Alışık, Furkan Palalı and İbrahim Çelikkol.

In 2023, she was cast as the protagonist Şebnem Gümüşçü in the Fox series Şahane Hayatım, alongside actors Onur Tuna, Yiğit Özşener, Serkan Keskin, Nesrin Cavadzade, Sumru Yavrucuk, Gökçe Eyüboğlu and Timur Acar.

Her recent work was in Sahtekarlar alongside Burak Deniz. It lasted from 2025-2026.

== Personal life ==
Hilal Altınbilek since 2021 has been romantically linked to the writer Metin Hara. Since 2022 she has been romantically linked to the hotel manager and entrepreneur Mehmet Can Uzun.

== Filmography ==
=== Film ===
Year	Title	Role	Director
2018	Çocuklar Sana Emanet	Yeşim	Çağan Irmak

=== Television ===
Year	Title	Role	Network	Episodes	Notes
2011	Derin Sular	İrem	Fox	116 episodes	Leading role
2013–2016	Black Rose (Karagül)	Özlem Şamverdi	Fox	125 episodes	Leading role
2016	Hayatımın Aşkı	Nil	Kanal D	17 episodes	Supporting role
2018–2022	Bir Zamanlar Çukurova	Züleyha Altun	ATV	141 episodes	Leading role
2023–2024	Şahane Hayatım	Şebnem Gümüşçü	Fox	30 episodes	Leading role
2025–2026	Sahtekarlar	Asya Madran	Now	22 episodes	Leading role

== Awards and nominations ==
Year	Award	Category	Work	Result	Notes
2014	Ayakli Gazete TV Stars Awards	Best Supporting actress in a drama series	Black Rose (Karagül)	Won	
2019	Golden Palm Awards	Best Actress in a television series	Bir Zamanlar Çukurova	Nominated	
2019	Pantene Golden Butterfly Awards	Best actress	Bir Zamanlar Çukurova	Nominated	
2020	International Izmir Film Festival	Best actress	Bir Zamanlar Çukurova	Nominated	
2020	Turkey Youth Awards	Best television actress	Bir Zamanlar Çukurova	Nominated	
2021	Ayakli Gazete TV Stars Awards	Best actress	Bir Zamanlar Çukurova	Nominated	
2023	Nations Award Taormina - Thinking Green	Best actress	Bir Zamanlar Çukurova	Won	With Kerem Alışık
