= Selin Genç =

Turkish actress and model (born 1994)

- Born: 21 June 1994 (age 31); Istanbul, Turkey
- Education: Işık University (industrial engineering); Selçuk University (theater department)
- Occupations: Actress; model
- Years active: 2018–present
- Known for: Bir Zamanlar Çukurova
- Height: 1.75 m (5 ft 8.90 in)
- Website: Selin Genç

Selin Genç (born 21 June 1994) is a Turkish actress and model.

== Biography ==
Selin Genç was born on 21 June 1994, in Istanbul (Turkey), and is from Tunceli both on her father and mother's side. She became interested in theater while in secondary school.

== Career ==
=== Education ===
Selin Genç during her studies at secondary school, she joined her school's drama group. After graduating from high school, she decided to enroll in the industrial engineering faculty of Işık University in Şile (Istanbul province), where she graduated a few years later. Following her interest in acting, she decided to enroll in the theater department of Selçuk University in Konya, where she obtained her acting degree a few years later. During the last year of his university education, he studied acting best at Akademi 35 Half Art House, an acting school run by actors Vahide Perçin and Altan Gördüm.

=== Professional career ===
Selin Genç in 2016 made his first theatrical experience with the show Murder Ballad. After the education he received, he was offered to act in television series.

From 2018 to 2022 she was chosen to play the role of Gülten Taşkın Ciğerci in the ATV series Bir Zamanlar Çukurova and where she acted alongside actors such as Hilal Altınbilek, Uğur Güneş, Murat Ünalmış, Vahide Perçin, Bülent Polat, Selin Yeninci, Polen Emre, Aras Şenol and Furkan Palalı. In 2020, for the latter series, she was nominated for Best Supporting TV Actress at the Turkey Youth Awards.

In 2021 she joined the cast of the Star TV series Sana Söz, playing the role of Bahar Atalay. The following year, 2022, she made her film debut with the role of Elif Karaca in the film Garip Bülbül Neşet Ertaş directed by Berker Berki and Ömer Faruk Sorak. In 2023 she joined the cast of tabii's web series Yangın Günleri: Independenta. In 2023 and 2024 she was chosen to play the role of Sena in the series broadcast on TRT 1 Teşkilat.

== Filmography ==
=== Film ===
Year	Title	Role	Director
2022	Garip Bülbül Neşet Ertaş	Elif Karaca	Berker Berki and Ömer Faruk Sorak

=== Television ===
Year	Title	Role	Network	Notes
2018–2022	Bir Zamanlar Çukurova	Gülten Taşkın Ciğerci	ATV	121 episodes
2021	Sana Söz	Bahar Atalay	Star TV	7 episodes
2023–2024	Teşkilat	Sena	TRT 1	28 episodes

=== Web series ===
Year	Title	Platform
2023	Yangın Günleri: Independenta	tabii

== Theatre ==
Year	Title
2016	Murder Ballad

== Awards and nominations ==
Year	Award	Category	Work	Result
2020	Turkey Youth Awards	Best Supporting TV Actress	Bir Zamanlar Çukurova	Nominated
