= List of programs broadcast by Now =

This is a list of television programs currently broadcast by the cable television channel Now in Turkey.

== Currently broadcast ==
=== Dramas ===
This is a list of Turkish television series currently broadcast, previously aired, and scheduled for future broadcast on the cable television channel NOW in Turkey.

- 2018-: Yasak Elma
- 2021-: Aşk Mantık İntikam
- 2021-: Kanunsuz Topraklar
- 2021-: Mahkum
- 2021-: Ayrılık
- 2021-: Skandal
- 2022-: Son Nefesime Kadar
- 2022-: Yaniliş Álcool
- 2022-: MangKate
- 2022-: Terry Yorkdızı
- 2022-: Paı Zacarıas
- 2022-: Zacarıas Mundo
- 2022-: Xadrez Chess
- 2023-: Smartphone Celular
- 2023-: Bambaşka Biri
- 2023-: Ruhun Duymaz
- 2023-: Yaz Şarkısı
- 2023-: Yabani
- 2023-: Hudutsuz Sevda

=== News and information ===
- 2009-: Burak Birsen ile NOW Ana Haber Hafta Sonu
- 2010-: Gülbin Tosun ile NOW Ana Haber Hafta Sonu
- 2013-: İsmail Küçükkaya ile Çalar Saat
- 2020-: Selçuk Tepeli ile NOW Ana Haber
- 2015-: Ezgi Gözeger ile Çalar Saat
- 2017-: İlker Karagöz ile Çalar Saat Hafta Sonu
- 2021-: Fulya İle Umudun Olsun

=== Reality ===
- 2021-: En Hamarat Benim

=== Daytime television ===
- 2021-: Fulya ile Umudun Olsun
- 2016-: Memet Özer ile Mutfakta
- 2016-: Benden Söylemesi

== Formerly broadcast ==
=== Dramas ===
- 2007–2008: Yemin
- 2007–2010: Bez Bebek
- 2007: Belalı Baldız (2005–2006, atv)
- 2007: Çocuklar Duymasın (2002, TGRT)
- 2007: Dadı (2000–2001, Show TV and Star TV)
- 2007: Kod Adı Sonsuzluk
- 2007: Sırça Saray
- 2007: Aşk Eski Bir Yalan
- 2007: Elif'in Günlüğü
- 2007: Düş Yakamdan
- 2007: Hırçın Kız
- 2007: Senin Uğruna
- 2007: Suç Dosyası
- 2007: Tutsak
- 2007: Üç Tatlı Cadı
- 2007–2008: OKS Anneleri
- 2007–2008: Yemin
- 2007–2010: Bez Bebek
- 2007–2011: Arka Sıradakiler (TNT, 2012)
- 2008: Ateş ve Barut
- 2008: Ateşten Koltuk
- 2008: Dedektif Biraderler
- 2008: Ece (Kanal 1)
- 2008: Kabuslar Evi
- 2008: Memur Muzaffer
- 2008: Prenses Perfinya
- 2008: Proje 13
- 2008: Üvey Aile
- 2008–2009: Yalancı Romantik (Kanal 1, 2007–2008)
- 2008–2016: Unutma Beni
- 2009: Sıkı Dostlar
- 2009: Uygun Adım Aşk
- 2009: Yeni Baştan
- 2009–2010: Çakıl Taşları
- 2009–2011: Ömre Bedel
- 2009–2014: Deniz Yıldızı (Star TV)
- 2010: Sensiz Yaşayamam
- 2010: Şen Yuva (atv, 2010)
- 2010–2011: Kirli Beyaz
- 2010–2011: Öğretmen Kemal
- 2010–2013: Yer Gök Aşk
- 2010–2014: Lale Devri (Show TV, 2010)
- 2011: Arka Sıradakiler Umut
- 2011: Canan
- 2011: Derin Sular
- 2011: Karımın Dediği Dedik Çaldığı Kontrbas
- 2011: Zehirli Sarmaşık
- 2011–2012: Babam İçin
- 2011–2012: Dinle Sevgili
- 2011–2012: Melekler Korusun (2009–2010, Show TV)
- 2012: Araf Zamanı
- 2012: Bir Ferhat ile Şirin Hikayesi – Esir Şehrin Gözyaşları
- 2012–2013: Aşkın Halleri
- 2012–2013: Dedemin Dolabı
- 2012–2013: Harem
- 2012–2013: Hindistan'da Aşk
- 2012–2013: Merhaba Hayat
- 2012–2013: Canım Benim
- 2013: Ali Ayşe'yi Seviyor
- 2013: Babam Sınıfta Kaldı
- 2013: Fatih Harbiye (Show TV)
- 2013: Görüş Günü Kadınları
- 2013: Kahireli Palas
- 2013: Fatih-Harbiye (Show TV, 2013–)
- 2013–2014: Bir Aşk Hikayesi
- 2013–2014: Doktorlar (2006–2011, Show TV)
- 2013–2014: Çocuklar Duymasın (atv)
- 2013–2014: Sana Bir Sır Vereceğim
- 2015–2014: Umutsuz Ev Kadınları (Kanal D, 2011–2012)
- 2013–2016: Karagül
- 2014: Asayiş Berkkemal
- 2014: Benim Hala Umudum Var (Star TV, 2013)
- 2014: Düşler ve Umutlar
- 2014: Emanet
- 2014: Günahkar
- 2014: Kadim Dostum
- 2014: Not Defteri
- 2014: Ruhumun Aynası
- 2014–2015: 1 Erkek 1 Kadın 2 Çocuk
- 2014–2015: Kiraz Mevsimi
- 2014–2016: Kocamın Ailesi
- 2014–2017: O Hayat Benim
- 2015: Adı Mutluluk
- 2015: Sen Benimsin
- 2015: Şehrin Melekleri
- 2015: Zengin Kız Fakir Oğlan (TRT 1)
- 2015–2016: Aşk Yeniden
- 2015–2016: İnadına Aşk
- 2016: Aşk Yalanı Sever
- 2016: Çifte Saadet
- 2016: Kalbim Yangın Yeri
- 2016: N'olur Ayrılalım
- 2016: Hayat Sevince Güzel
- 2016: Rüzgarın Kalbi
- 2016: Kördüğüm
- 2016: Familya
- 2016–2017: Bana Sevmeyi Anlat
- 2016–2017: Muhteşem Yüzyıl: Kösem (moved from Star TV)
- 2016–2017: No 309
- 2016–2017: Umuda Kelepçe Vurulmaz
- 2016–2018: Kalbimdeki Deniz
- 2017: Bu Sayılmaz
- 2017: Çoban Yıldızı
- 2017: Dayan Yüreğim
- 2017: Deli Gönül
- 2017: Esaretim Sensin
- 2017: Kayıtdışı
- 2017: Kırlangıç Fırtınası
- 2017: Komşular
- 2017: Nerdesin Birader
- 2017–2018: Şevkat Yerimdar
- 2017–2019: Bizim Hikaye
- 2017–2020: Kadın
- 2018: Bir Mucize Olsun
- 2018: Adı: Zehra
- 2018: 4N1K İlk Aşk
- 2018: Bir Deli Rüzgar
- 2019: Vurgun
- 2019: Bir Aile Hikayesi
- 2019: Her Yerde Sen[tr]
- 2019: Kurşun
- 2019: Ferhat ile Şirin
- 2020: Öğretmen
- 2020: Zümrüdüanka
- 2020: Şehin
- 2020–2021: Kerfaret
- 2020–2021: Bay Yaniliş
- 2021: Uzak Şerhin Masalı
- 2021: Son Yaz
- 2021: Yalancılar ve Mumları
- 2021: Elbet Bir Gün
- 2021: Evlilik Hakkında Her Şey
- 2021: Misafır
- 2021: Elkızı

=== Music/Entertainment ===
- 2007: Şebnemle Fatih (Kanal 7)
- 2014: Ali Biçim Show
- 2014: Ferhat Göçer ile Sen Söyle Hayat
- 2014: Nilgün Belgün'le Bir Yaz Gecesi
- 2016: Görevimiz Komedi

=== Children ===
- Luniler
- 2007–2008: Çocuktan Al Haberi (Kanal D, Star TV)
- 2011: Barbie, Polly Pocket, Monster High

=== Magazine ===
- N'ayır N'olamaz
- Reklam Masası
- Sobe
- 2007–2011: Bizden Kaçmaz
- 2009–2012: Süper Kulüp
- 2012–2014: FOX İzliyoruz
- 2013: Magazin 90
- 2015: Magazin Postası

=== News ===
- 2007: FOX Flaş
- 2007: FOX Güncel
- 2007–2009: FOX Gündem
- 2007: Güne Bakış
- 2007: Gün Başladı
- 2007–2010: İrfan Değirmenci ile Çalar Saat (Kanal D)
- 2007–2008: Özge Uzun'la Haftasonu Haberleri
- 2007–2008: Umut Yertutan ile Yaz Haberleri
- 2007–2013: Nazlı Tolga ile FOX Ana Haber
- 2008–2009: Özge Uzun'la FOX Beşbuçuk
- 2008–2010: Nazlı Tolga ile FOX ON Ana Haber
- 2009: İrfan Değirmenci ile Haftasonu Haberleri
- 2009–2010: Burak Birsen ile FOX Akşam
- 2009–2010: Alper Altun ile Yaz Haberleri
- 2009–2011: Hilal Ergenekon ile Çalar Saat Hafta Sonu
- 2010–2013: Fatih Portakal ile Çalar Saat
- 2012–2013: FOX Gece
- 2013–2020: Fatih Portakal ile FOX Ana Haber

=== Sports ===
- 2007–2010: FOX Sports
- 2007–2008: Tribune Fire
- 2007–2008: 4-4-2
- 2007–2008: Boxing Night
- 2007–2008: Verkaç
- 2009: Turkish Super Cup (Show TV)
- 2009–2010: FOX Football
- 2009–2010: FOX Football Market
- 2009–2010: FOX Goal Market
- 2009–2011: WWE SmackDown (moved from S'nek, moved to Smart Sports)
- 2009–2011: WWE Raw (moved from S'nek, moved to Smart Sports)

=== Women's ===
- 2016: İşin Sırrı Derya'da

=== Current affairs ===
- 2007: Çapraz Ateş (Show TV)
- 2007–2009: Objektif (Moved from Star TV, moved to Beyaz TV)
- 2009: Türkiye'nin Seçimi
- 2011: Hayat Tadında Güzel
- 2011, 2012–2013: Hayatın Şifreleri (temporarily moved to TNT)
- 2013–2014: Fatih Portakal'la Türkiye'nin Trendleri
- 2014: Fatih Portakal'la Seçim 2014

=== Daytime television ===
- Eve Giden Yol
- Uyanık Bar
- 2007: Asena ile Canımın İçi
- 2007: Pınar Altuğ ile Sizi Böyle Alalım
- 2007: Şebnem Kısaparmak ile Paylaştıkça (Moved from Kanal 7, moved to Flash)
- 2007–2013: Su Gibi
- 2008: İki Gönül Bir Olunca
- 2009–2010: Dekodizayn (Moved from Star, moved to Beyaz)
- 2010: Kürşat Başar'la (Moved from CNN Türk)
- 2010: Rengarenk
- 2011: Taşlama
- 2011: Van İçin Tek Yürek
- 2011–2012: Bilsen Neler Oluyor
- 2012–2013: Güneri Civaoğlu ile Şeffaf Oda (Moved from Kanal D, moved to tv8)
- 2013: Affetsen
- 2013: Bırakın Konuşalım (Moved from Kanal D)
- 2013: Mucize Hayatlar
- 2013: Serap ile Yeni Bir Umut
- 2014: Nilgün-Gabriele Mutfakta
- 2014: Nilgün Belgün ile Yeni Bir Gün
- 2014: Türkan Şoray ile Pazar Kahvaltısı
- 2014–2015: Esra Erol'da
- 2015–2016: Zuhal Topal'la (moved to Star TV)
- 2016: Benden Söylemesi

=== Game shows ===
- Her Şey Aşk İçin
- 2007–2008: Ahmet Çakar'la Şansa Bak
- 2007: Bir Dilek Tut (Moved from Star TV)
- 2007: Güldür Bakalım (Moved from Show TV)
- 2007–2009: Fort Boyard
- 2008–2009: 50 Sarışın
- 2008–2009: Çarkıfelek (Moved from Kanal 1, moved to Star TV)
- 2008–2009: Tadında Aşk Var
- 2009: Popstar Alaturka (Moved from Star TV)
- 2009–2013: Ninja Warrior
- 2010: Ece Erken'le Benimle Eğlenir misin?
- 2010: İntercities Şehirler Yarışıyor
- 2011: 101
- 2011: Bambaşka Style by Jury
- 2011: Cem Kılıç ile Sen de Söyle
- 2011: L'Oreal Paris Miss Turkey
- 2011: Tabu (Moved from Show TV, moved back to Show TV)
- 2011–2012: Var Mısın Yok Musun (Moved from Show TV, moved back to Show TV)
- 2012: Bir Milyon Canlı Para (Moved from Show TV, moved to Kanal D)
- 2012: Fear Factor Extreme (Original broadcast: 2009, Star TV)
- 2012: Kamuflaj (Moved from Show TV)
- 2012: Kime Niyet Kime Kısmet
- 2012–2013: İmkansız Karaoke Yılbaşı Özel
- 2012–2013: Yemekteyiz (Moved from Show TV, moved to Kanal D)
- 2013: Biri Bizi Durdursun
- 2013: Fear Factor Aksiyon
- 2014: Kaç Para Kaç
- 2014: Kelime Oyunu (Moved from Show TV)
- 2015: Sesi Çok Güzel
- 2017: Ben Söylerim
- 2019–2021: Temizlik Benim İşim
- 2022: The Masked Singer Turkey
