= Are We OK? =

- Film poster
- Turkish: Tamam mıyız?
- Directed by: Çağan Irmak
- Starring: Deniz Celiloğlu; Aras Bulut İynemli
- Release date: 29 November 2013
- Running time: 92 minutes
- Country: Turkey
- Language: Turkish

Are We OK? (Turkish: Tamam mıyız?) is a 2013 Turkish drama film directed by Çağan Irmak.

== Cast ==
- Deniz Celiloğlu - Temmuz
- Aras Bulut İynemli - İhsan
- Sumru Yavrucuk - Temmuz's mother
- Zuhal Gencer - Feride
- Aslı Enver - Beste
- Uğur Güneş (actor) - Serhat
- Gürkan Uygun - İhsan's father
