= Birce Akalay =

Turkish actress (born 1984)

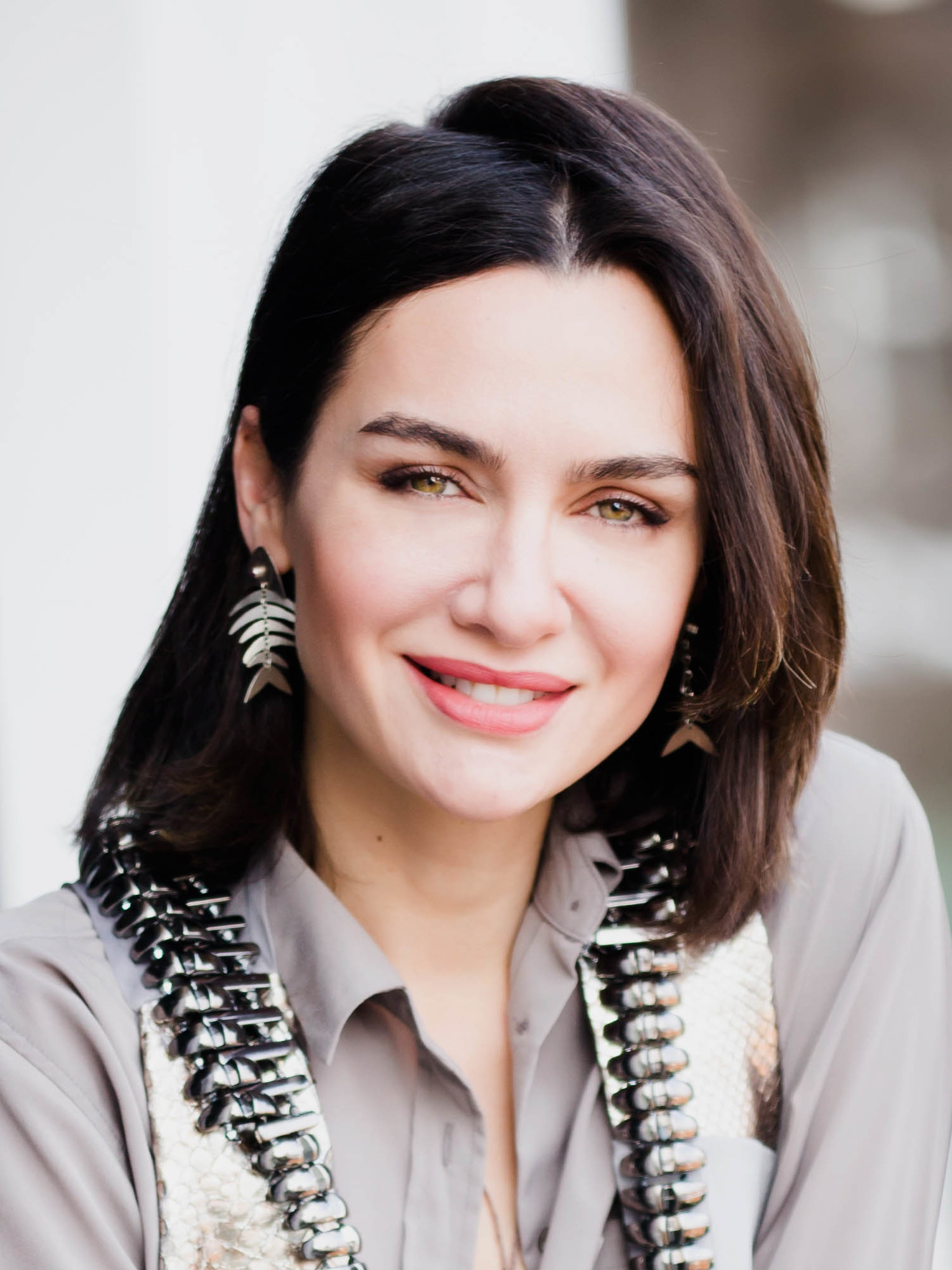
- Akalay posing for an interview with Cumhuriyet during the promotion of Keşanlı Ali Destanı in 2020 (photo by Vedat Arık)
- Born: 19 June 1984 (age 42); Istanbul, Turkey
- Education: Haliç University Conservatory
- Occupation: Actress
- Years active: 2006–present
- Spouses: Murat Ünalmış (m. 2011; div. 2012) Sarp Levendoğlu (m. 2014; div. 2017)

Birce Akalay (born 19 June 1984) is a Turkish actress. She has appeared in over 20 films and TV series, gaining popularity for her performances. She has also presented sports on national television in Turkey and anchored many programs, making her name associated with sports and TV anchoring for about five years. Projects such as the series Yer Gök Aşk and the play 7 Kocalı Hürmüz, directed by Müjdat Gezen, are among her notable works. However, it was in 2017, playing the doctor Aslı Çınar alongside actor İbrahim Çelikkol, that she achieved her most successful series, Siyah Beyaz Aşk, which became famous not only in Europe but also in several countries in the Americas. In 2020, she had leading role in the famous play Keşanlı Ali Destanı and portrayed the character of Zilha. At the same time, she continued her career on television with leading role in Star TV's series Babil, which premiered in January 2020. In 2022, she starred alongside actor İbrahim Çelikkol again in the Netflix series Kuş Uçuşu.

== Life and career ==
Akalay was born on 19 June 1984 in Istanbul. She started ballet at the age of four and was injured at the age of sixteen. She graduated from theatre department of Pera Fine Arts High School in 2003. She then enrolled in Istanbul University with a major in theatre analysis but left the school at third grade to pursue her dream of becoming a theatre actress. Since she had reached the age of twenty, she lost the chance to win a place in state conservatory but instead won a seat in Haliç University Conservatory for theatre studies and finished her education there. As of 2020, she is a lecturer at Haliç University's theatre department, teaching acting courses. In 2004, she competed in Miss Turkey and finished in the 3rd place. Subsequently, she represented her country in Miss Europe. Her cousin, Barış Murat Yağcı, is also an actor.

In 2007, she made her television debut with a supporting role in the hit series Asi. She had her first cinematic role in the same year with a part in the movie Son Ders: Aşk ve Üniversite. She got her first leading role in television with the series Kader, playing the character of Lamia, and was then cast in the series Senin Uğruna in the same year.

After playing supporting roles in Alayına İsyan and Kış Masalı in 2009, her breakthrough came with her role as Havva in 2010 series Yer Gök Aşk, which was well received by critics and fans.

In 2013, she portrayed Ayhan Aydan in historical series Ben Onu Çok Sevdim based on the life of Prime Minister of Turkey Adnan Menderes.

She continued her TV career with roles in child series Küçük Ağa (2014–2015), where she acted alongside Sarp Levendoğlu, who later became her husband. Also starred rom-com Evli ve Öfkeli (2015–2016) and youth series Hayat Bazen Tatlıdır (2016–2017). In 2017, she starred as Asli Çinar alongside actor Ibrahim Çelikkol in Siyah Beyaz Aşk, which was a hugely popular, leading the pair to garner a legion of fans not only from Turkey but also from other countries. But could not garner success in terms of television ratings. The show was cancelled at episode 32 due to low ratings and management change at Kanal D.

After playing a leading role in the TV series Ağlama Anne in late 2018, she didn't appear in any productions for 1 year.

In the meantime, she started teaching as a lecturer at Haliç University Theater Department and took part in the music program Benimle Söyle as the chief judge. In January 2020, she began portraying İlay in Star TV's series Babil. Akalay has also continued her career on stage and in 2020 appeared as "Zilha" in the play Keşanlı Ali Destanı.

In 2022, Birce Akalay starred in two Netflix series: Mezarlik as Önem and Kuş Uçuşu as Lale Kiran. In the latter, she reunited with her former co-star Ibrahim Çelilkkol. These two series marked her first major projects, and with the help of Netflix's global audience, Birce Akalay's fame quickly rose. Kuş Uçuşu has already aired its 2nd and 3rd seasons.

== Filmography ==
=== Film ===
Film
Year	Title	Role	Notes
2008	Son Ders: Aşk ve Üniversite	Sevim	Guest
2009	Sizi Seviyorum	Eda	Leading role
2009	Nefes: Vatan Sağolsun	Zeynep	Guest
2013	Re-Era	Scientist 1	Short film
2016	Deliormanlı	Hülya	Leading role
2024	Zaferin Rengi	Halide Edib Adıvar	Guest
2024	Bir Cumhuriyet Şarkısı	Nimet Vahid	

=== Web series ===
Web Series
Year	Title	Role	Notes
2021	Dijital Sahne: Hırçın Kız	Kate	Leading role of Episode
2022–2024	Kuş Uçuşu	Lale Kıran	Leading role
2022–2026	Mezarlık	Önem Özülkü	Leading role

=== TV series ===
TV Series
Year	Title	Role	Notes
2007	Asi	Zeynep	Guest
2007	Kader	Lamia	Leading role
2007	Senin Uğruna	Özlem	Leading role
2009	Alayına İsyan	Sevtap	Leading role
2009	Kış Masalı	Zişan	Supporting role
2010–2012	Yer Gök Aşk	Havva Karagül	Leading role
2013	Böyle Bitmesin	Aylin	Guest
2013	Ben Onu Çok Sevdim	Ayhan Aydan	Leading role
2014–2015	Küçük Ağa	Sinem Acar	Leading role
2015–2016	Evli ve Öfkeli	Esra	Leading role
2016–2017	Hayat Bazen Tatlıdır	Hayat Sarıyaz	Leading role
2017–2018	Siyah Beyaz Aşk	Aslı Çınar Aslan	Leading role
2018	Ağlama Anne	Alev Fırıncıoğlu	Leading role
2020	Babil	İlay Yücedağ	Leading role
2021	Son Yaz	Sare Akay	Leading role
2023	Bir Derdim Var	Dr. Nilüfer Toska	Leading role
2027-	Yasak Elma’s	Peri	Leading role

=== TV programs ===
Programs
Year	Title	Notes
2004–2006	Spor Gecesi	Presenter
2005	Şampiyonlar Ligi Finali	Presenter (Turkish version)
2005	Şampiyonlar Ligi Özel	Presenter
2006	8. Etap	Presenter
2009	Sinema Dünyası	Presenter
2019	Benimle Söyle	Judge

=== Commercial ===
Commercial
year	Company/Product	Notes
2014	Johnson & Johnson	Advertising face
2014	Orkid	Advertising face
2014	Algida	Summer campaign
2021	Şölen Boombastic Fantastik Bar	As a voiceover
2022	Lancôme	Brand face
2022	Neutrogena	Brand face
2022	Dagi	Brand face
2023	Versace	Advertising face
2023	Jack Daniel's	Brand face
2024	Nespresso	Brand face
2024	BMW	Brand face
2024	QNB	Brand face

== Theatre ==
Year	Title	Role	Writer	Director	Notes
2017–2019	Yedi Kocalı Hürmüz	Hürmüz	Sadık Şendil	Müjdat Gezen	
2020	Keşanlı Ali Destanı	Zilha	Haldun Taner	Yücel Erten	
2021	The Taming of the Shrew	Katherina (Kate) Minola	William Shakespeare	İbrahim Çiçek	

== Awards and nominations ==
Year	Award	Category	Work	Result	Ref.
2017	Barrier-Free Life Foundation 8th Bests of the Year Awards	Best Theatre Actress	Yedi Kocalı Hürmüz	Won	
2018	9th Karadeniz Technical University (KTÜ) Media Awards	Best Actress	Siyah Beyaz Aşk	Won	
2018	Istanbul University 1453 Awards	Best Actress of the Year	Siyah Beyaz Aşk	Won	
2018	2nd Bosphorus Awards	Most Successful Actress	Siyah Beyaz Aşk	Won	
2018	45th Golden Butterfly Awards	Best Actress	Siyah Beyaz Aşk	Nominated	
2019	Okan University Bests of the Year Awards	Best TV Actress	Ağlama Anne	Won	
2019	2nd Best of Rumeli Awards	Best Actress		Won	
2020	3rd International İzmir Artemis Film Festival	Best Actress (TV series)	Babil	Nominated	
2021	We Asked the Students Project Awards	Best Actress	Babil	Won	
2022	6th Distinctive International Arab Festivals Awards	International Actress of the Year	Kuş Uçuşu; Mezarlık	Won	
