= Nehir Erdoğan =

Turkish actress

- Born: İzmir, Turkey
- Occupation: Actress
- Years active: 2002–present

Nehir Erdoğan is a Turkish actress. She became famous in Yabancı Damat, the first Turkish TV series sold to channels of Greece. She subsequently appeared in other popular movies and television series.

Erdoğan has appeared alongside Engin Altan Düzyatan in the crime series Son and the youth series Koçum Benim. Son's adaptation rights have been sold to the USA, France, Spain, Russia, and the Netherlands. She has also appeared in the crime series Reaksiyon along with İbrahim Çelikkol. She had a guest role in the popular series Fi.

Erdoğan appeared in Hababam Sınıfı Merhaba and in the youth thriller film Okul. She also appeared alongside Berk Oktay in the romantic comedy Tatlı Bela Fadime.

== Filmography ==
Film
Year	Title	Role	Note
2003	Hababam Sınıfı Merhaba	Arzu / Kız İsmail	
2004	Okul	Güldem	
2008	Meleğin Sırları	Ebru	
2014	Silsile	Ece	
Web series
Year	Title	Role	Note
2017	Fi	Nilay	
TV series
Year	Title	Role	Note
2003	Koçum Benim	Pelin	
2003	Estağfurullah Yokuşu	Gümüş	
2004–2007	Yabancı Damat	Nazlı Baklavacıoğlu	
2007–2008	Tatlı Bela Fadime	Fadime	
2008	Ay Işığı – Avukatlar	Başak Aydost	
2009–2010	Aşk Bir Hayal	Asmin	
2012	Son	Aylin Karan	
2014	Reaksiyon	Duygu	
2018–2019	İkizler Memo-Can	Melek Caneri	
2019–2021	Benim Adım Melek	Melek Karadağ	
2021	Sana Söz	Elif Karaca	
2023	Yasak Elma	Julia Moran	
2026	Altı Üstü İstanbul	Zehra Cankaya	
