= Bir Zamanlar Çukurova =

Turkish Television series

- Bir Zamanlar Çukurova
- Genre: Drama; Romance; Crime; Psychological thriller
- Written by: Yıldız Tunç; Atilla Özel; Ayça Üzüm; Melis Veziroglu Yilmaz; Selena Çağlayan
- Directed by: Faruk Teber (s. 1-2); Murat Saraçoğlu (s. 3-4); Evren Karabıyık Günaydın (s. 3-4)
- Starring: Hilal Altınbilek; Uğur Güneş; Murat Ünalmış; Vahide Perçin; Furkan Palalı; Melike İpek Yalova; Kerem Alışık; İbrahim Çelikkol; Bülent Polat; Selin Yeninci; Selin Genç; Serpil Tamur; Sibel Taşçıoğlu; Turgay Aydın; İlayda Çevik; Polen Emre; Esra Dermancıoğlu; Hülya Darcan; Aras Şenol; Şahin Vural; Hande Soral; Nazan Kesal; Erkan Bektaş
- Composer: Aytekin Ataş
- Country of origin: Turkey
- Original language: Turkish
- No. of seasons: 4
- No. of episodes: 141

Production
- Producers: Timur Savcı; Burak Sağyaşar; Burak Topuzlu; Turan Bayat
- Production locations: Istanbul and Çukurova (Adana)
- Camera setup: Sedat Yücel
- Running time: 150 minutes
- Production company: Tims&B Productions

Original release
- Network: ATV Turkey
- Release: September 13, 2018 – June 16, 2022

Bir Zamanlar Çukurova (Turkish for 'Once Upon a Time Çukurova') is a Turkish romantic drama psychological thriller series that broadcast on ATV Turkey between September 13, 2018 and June 16, 2022.

== Synopsis ==
During the 70s, the couple in love Züleyha and Yılmaz decide to hide their identities due to the murder that Yilmaz had committed to protect his beloved from a sexual assault, so they decide to embark on a train trip from Istanbul to the unknown.

Fate takes them to the fertile region of Çukurova, specifically to the Adana Province, where they decide to stay and work on Hünkar Yaman's farm together with his son Demir, who will fall in love with the young woman without knowing that her heart belongs to Yılmaz. However, in order to obtain accommodation and work, the couple pretend to be siblings, something that Demir will not know until then, many unexpected things will happen.

== Cast ==
Actor/Actress	Character
Hilal Altınbilek	Züleyha Altun
Uğur Güneş	Yılmaz Akkaya
Murat Ünalmış	Demir Yaman
Vahide Perçin	Hünkar Saraçoğlu / Yaman
Kerem Alışık	Ali Rahmet Fekeli
Melike İpek Yalova	Müjgan Hekimoğlu
Furkan Palalı	Fikret Fekeli
İbrahim Çelikkol	Hakan Gümüşoglu / Mehmet Kara
Serpil Tamur	Haminne / Azize Saraçoğlu
Turgay Aydın	Sabahattin Arcan
Sibel Taşçıoğlu	Şermin Yaman
İlayda Çevik	Betül Arcan
Ebru Aytemur	Nihal Çimen
Bülent Polat	Gaffur Taşkın
Selin Yeninci	Saniye Taşkın
Selin Genç	Gülten Taşkın
Aras Şenol	Çetin Ciğerci
Polen Emre	Fadik Kaya
Şahin Vural	Raşit Kaya
Yeliz Doğramacılar	Füsun Arman
Teksin Pircanlı	Nazire
Hande Soral	Ayla Ümit Kahraman
Hülya Darcan	Lütfiye Duman
Mehmet Polat	Hatip Tellidere
Şirin Öten	Naciye Tellidere
Alayça Öztürk	Jülide Yalçınkaya
Esra Dermancıoğlu	Behice Hekimoğlu
Nazan Kesal	Sevda Çağlayan / Fatma Özden
Ebru Ünlü	Seher
Mihriban Er	Sevil Hekimoğlu
Funda Pelin Kurt	Emle Akman
Engin Yüksel	Behzat Hekimoğlu
Rüzgar Aksoy	Ercüment Akman
Şebnem Dilligil	Naime
Alp Özgür Yaşin	Sait Ersoy
Mustafa Açılan	Veli Erdönmez
Ömer Fethi Canpolat	Adnan "Yılmaz" Yaman / Akkaya
Ahmet Doğan	Adnan "Yılmaz" Yaman / Akkaya
Neva Pekuz	Üzüm Tökün / Taşkın
Erkan Bektaş	Abdülkadir Keskin
Ergün Metin	Vahap Keskin
Altan Gördüm	Haşmet Çolak
Kadim Yaşar	Cengaver "Cengo" Çimen

== Series overview ==
Season	Episodes	Originally released	
Season	Episodes	First released	Last released
1	35	September 13, 2018	May 30, 2019
2	28	September 19, 2019	April 9, 2020
3	39	September 17, 2020	June 24, 2021
4	39	September 9, 2021	June 16, 2022

== Production ==
The series is produced by Timur Savcı, Burak Sağyaşar, Burak Topuzlu and Turan Bayat, in collaboration with the production house Tims&B Productions.

=== Filming ===
The series was filmed in the cities of Adana and Mersin, Turkey. The hospital shooting in the series was done at Nusret Karasu Chest Disease Hospital. One of the shooting locations was Varda Viaduct, located in Hacıkırı in Karaisalı of Adana Province.
