= Vurgun =

Vurgun may refer to:

- Samad Vurgun, writer
- Vurğun, Azerbaijan
- Vurgun (web series), a Turkish series
