= Genç =

Genç (IPA: [ɟentʃ]) is a Turkish name, it may refer to:

== People ==
- Aytek Genc (born 1966), Turkish Australian footballer
- Burhan Genç (born 1983), known as Burhan G, Danish R&B and pop singer
- Faruk Can Genç (born 2000), Turkish footballer
- Kamer Genç (1940–2016), Turkish politician
- Mehmet Genç (1934-2021), Turkish historian
- Nihat Genç (1956–2025), Turkish journalist and writer
- Selin Genç (born 1994), Turkish actress and model
- Süleyman Genç (1944–2022), Turkish politician

=== Given name ===
- Genc Iseni (born 1983), Kosovar Albanian footballer
- Genc Ruli (born 1958), Albanian politician
- Genç Osman Yavaş (born 1971), Turkish rock singer

== Places ==
- Genç, Bingöl, town and district of Bingöl Province in the Eastern Anatolia region of Turkey

== See also ==
- Genç Fenerbahçeliler, fan group of Turkish football team Fenerbahçe
- Genc mountains, in Southern Turkiye
- İki Genç Kız, 2005 Turkish film
- Genç Kalemler, Ottoman cultural and literary magazine
