= Hayal Köseoğlu =

Turkish actress and singer (born 1992)

- Born: December 20, 1992 (age 33); Istanbul, Turkey
- Education: Istanbul Aydın University School of Fine Arts, Department of Drama and Acting
- Occupations: Actress; singer
- Years active: 1998–1999; 2008–present

Hayal Köseoğlu (born 20 December 1992) is a Turkish actress and singer, known for her roles Açelya in Mucize Doktor and Sasha Doğan in Mahkum.

== Life and career ==
Hayal Köseoğlu was born on December 20, 1992, in Istanbul. She completed her education at Istanbul Aydın University, Faculty of Fine Arts, Department of Drama and Acting. Köseoğlu, who met acting at a young age, had her first acting experience in the fantasy comedy series Ruhsar series broadcast on Kanal D at the age of 6 and hit series Mahallenin Muhtarları. She also appeared in the TV series Aşk-ı Memnu, Muhteşem Yüzyıl, İstanbullu Gelin. She had leading role in youth series Arkadaşlar İyidir.

She played as Derya in Ufak Tefek Cinayetler. She was cast in medical series Mucize Doktor. As of 2022, she played Sasha in Fox's Mahkum. She played in Gain web series Cezailer about Rosenhan experiment.

== Filmography ==
=== Movies ===
Year	Title	Role
2019	Sesinde Aşk Var	Deniz
2019	Özgür Dünya	Duygu
2019	7.Koğuştaki Mucize	Adult Ova
2021	Bir Nefes Daha	Efsun

=== TV series ===
Year	Title	Role
1998	Ruhsar	
1999	Mahallenin Muhtarları	Zekiye
2008–2010	Aşk-ı Memnu	Pelin
2011	Muhteşem Yüzyıl	Nilüfer Hatun
2016	Arkadaşlar İyidir	Merve Altınköprü
2017	Ufak Tefek Cinayetler	Derya
2017–2018	İstanbullu Gelin	Zeynep Gürsoy
2019–2021	Mucize Doktor	Açelya Dingin
2021–2022	Mahkum	Sasha Doğan
2023	Altın Kafes	Ahu Karataş
2024–present	Hudutsuz Sevda	Damla Leto

=== Web series ===
Year	Title	Role
2021	Bonkis	Özge
2022	Cezailer	Simge Saygın
