= Sana Söz =

Turkish television series

- Turkish: Sana Söz
- Literally: Promise to You
- Genre: Drama; Romance; Detective
- Written by: Ali Erkan Ersezer; Sertaç Sayın
- Directed by: Şenol Sönmez
- Starring: see cast
- Composer: Şenol Sönmez
- Country of origin: Turkey
- Original language: Turkish
- No. of seasons: 1
- No. of episodes: 7

Production
- Producer: Saner Ayar
- Production location: Istanbul
- Running time: 120 minutes
- Production company: O3 Medya

Original release
- Network: Star TV
- Release: November 2 – December 14, 2021

Sana Söz (International title: True Lies) is a Turkish romantic drama series composed of 7 episodes, that broadcast on Star TV between November 2 and December 14, 2021. It is directed by Şenol Sönmez, written by Ali Erkan Ersezer and Sertaç Sayın, produced by O3 Medya and stars Erkan Petekkaya, Nehir Erdoğan, Serkan Altunorak and Ayçin İnci.

== Plot ==
The series tells the story between the police officer and detective Ömer Duran and Elif Karaca and that of Erdem Karaca and Aysel Duran.

== Cast ==
Actor/Actress	Character	Episodes
Erkan Petekkaya	Ömer Duran	1–7
Nehir Erdoğan	Elif Karaca	1–7
Serkan Altunorak	Erdem Karaca	1–7
Ayçin İnci	Aysel Duran	1–7
Hivda Zizan Alp	Nazlı	1–7
Emin Olcay	Azmi Duran	1–7
Ferhat Baynal	Zeki	1–7
Ali Önsöz	Bora Demircioğlu	1–7
Aslıhan Kapanşahin	Duru Karaca	1–7
Atakan Hoşgören	Umut Karaca	1–7
Selin Genç	Bahar	1–7
Selda Güldükoğlu	Feray	1–7
Yaşar Aydınoğlu	Rıza Demircioğlu	1–6
Ayça İnci	Aydan / Elif'i Rehin Alan Kadın	1–4
Orhan Güner	Sevket	1
Nursena Özcanlı	Serra	1
Gizem Tileylioğlu	Eylül	1
Burak Zafer	Çagdas	1
Fırat Turgut	Levent	5–6

== Episodes ==
n°	Original title	Original air date
1	1. Bölüm	2 November 2021
2	2. Bölüm	9 November 2021
3	3. Bölüm	16 November 2021
4	4. Bölüm	23 November 2021
5	5. Bölüm	30 November 2021
6	6. Bölüm	7 December 2021
7	7. Bölüm	14 December 2021

== Production ==
The series is directed by Şenol Sönmez, written by Ali Erkan Ersezer and Sertaç Sayın and produced by O3 Medya.

=== Filming ===
The series was filmed entirely in Istanbul, specifically in the Beşiktaş and the Galata districts.

== Promotion ==
The series' debut, scheduled for November 2, 2021, was announced on October 26 via the series' Twitter profile. The first promos for the series have been released since October 2021.
