= Şahane Hayatım =

Turkish television series

- Genre: Psychological thriller Romance; Crime thriller
- Written by: Meriç Acemi
- Directed by: Çağrı Bayrak
- Starring: Hilal Altınbilek; Onur Tuna; Yiğit Özşener; Serkan Keskin; Nesrin Cavadzade; Sumru Yavrucuk
- Composer: Güldiyar Tanrıdağlı
- Country of origin: Türkiye
- Original language: Turkish
- No. of seasons: 1
- No. of episodes: 30

Production
- Producer: Kerem Çatay
- Production location: Istanbul
- Running time: 120 minutes
- Production company: Ay Yapım

Original release
- Network: NOW
- Release: 1 November 2023 – 5 June 2024

Şahane Hayatım is a Turkish romantic psychological thriller television series that has been broadcast on NOW since November 1, 2023. It is directed by Çağrı Bayrak, written by Meriç Acemi, produced by Ay Yapım and stars Hilal Altınbilek, Onur Tuna, Yiğit Özşener, Serkan Keskin, Nesrin Cavadzade and Sumru Yavrucuk.

== Plot ==
The series focuses on the life of Sebnem Gümüşçü, an unfortunate woman who was born with great injustices and during her growing up journey began to work hard to overcome them and do everything necessary to forget the crimes that occurred in the past. More late in her criminal past he began to pursue her and she began to form part of her daily life, as long as she lived a wonderful life.

== Cast ==
=== Main characters ===
Actor/Actress	Character	Episodes
Hilal Altınbilek	Şebnem Arda Gümüşçü Öztürkmen	1-30
Onur Tuna	Mesut Öztürkmen	1-30
Yiğit Özşener	Onur Gümüşçü	1-30
Serkan Keskin	Niyazi Adalı	1-30
Nesrin Cavadzade	Melisa Özsoy	3-30
Sumru Yavrucuk	Aysel Gümüşçü	1-30

=== Secondary characters ===
Actor/Actress	Character	Episodes
Gökçe Eyüboğlu	Didem Özcan	1-
Zeynep Yüce	Şebnem Gümüşçü young	1-
Timur Acar	Selo/Selahattin	1-
Elif Kurtaran	Ece Gümüşçü	1-
İncinur Daşdemir	Mother of Şebnem Gümüşçü	1-
Seda Akman	Arzu	1-
Taner Rumeli	Fatih Hoca	1-2

== Series overview ==
Season	Episodes	Originally released	
Season	Episodes	First released	Last released
1	30	November 1, 2023	5th June 2024

== Production ==
The series is directed by Çağrı Bayrak, written by Meriç Acemi and produced by Ay Yapım.

=== Filming ===
Filming for the series took place in Istanbul, particularly in the districts of Beşiktaş, Galata and their surrounding areas.

== Promotion ==
The debut of the series, scheduled for November 1, 2023, was announced on October 27 on Fox Turkey, through the social channels of the series and the production company Ay Yapım, while the first promos were released they launched on September 22 and at the same time the poster for the series was also published.
