= Ulubatlı Hasan =

Turkish martyr (1428 – 1453)

- الوباطلى حسن (Ottoman Turkish)
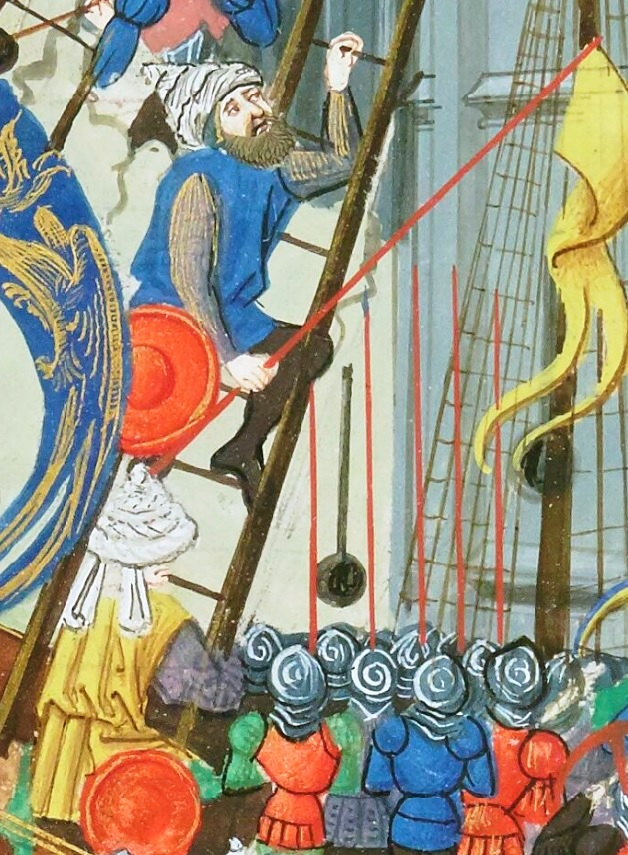
- Picture of Ulubatlı Hasan from the National library of France
- Born: c. 1428; Ulubat, Ottoman Empire
- Died: 29 May 1453 (aged 25); Constantinople
- Burial place: Fatih İskenderpaşa Neighborhood, Fatih, Istanbul
- Citizenship: Ottoman
- Occupation: Sekbanbaşı

Ulubatlı Hasan (Ottoman Turkish: الوباطلى حسن), also known as Baba Hasan Ağa the Standard Bearer (Ottoman Turkish: سنجاقدار بابا حسن آغا) or Baba Hasan-ı ‘Alemî (Ottoman Turkish: بابا حسنِ عَلَمِى) (c. 1428, Ulubat, Karacabey, Bursa – 29 May 1453, Istanbul), was the sekbanbaşı who erected the first standard on the Byzantine walls during the Conquest of Constantinople.

He was born in a small village called Ulubat (near Karacabey) in the province of Bursa and was 25 years old when he was present at the Siege of Constantinople, under the command of Sultan Mehmed II.

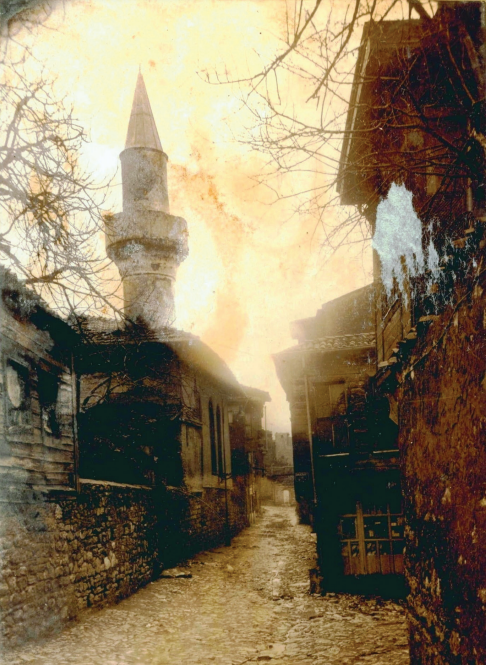
Photograph of Ulubatlı Hasan's mosque in Istanbul, demolished 1956

On the early morning of the last day of the siege, May 29, after the morning prayer, the Ottoman military band started to play one of their songs before the city was stormed. Ulubatlı Hasan was among the first to climb the walls of Constantinople, followed closely by thirty of his friends. He carried only an Ottoman kilij, a small shield and the Ottoman flag. He climbed the wall, under showers of arrows, stones, spears and bullets, reaching the top and placing the flag, which he defended until his 12 remaining friends arrived. After that he collapsed with 27 arrows still in his body. Seeing the Ottoman flag inspired the other Ottoman troops and kept their spirits up – and conversely, disheartened the Greek defenders – until the Ottomans finally conquered Constantinople.

== In popular culture ==
- Hasan of Ulubat was played by Turan Seyfioğlu in Turkish film İstanbul'un Fethi (1951)
- İbrahim Çelikkol plays Hasan in Turkish film Fetih 1453 (2012). In the film, there is a romance between him and fictional character named Era (Dilek Serbest).
- Ulubatlı Hasan Alp is played by Sidar Tublek in the Turkish Series Mehmed: Sultan of Conquests (2024)

== See also ==
- Fall of Constantinople
- Mehmed II
- Sipahi
- Lake Uluabat
