= Yasemin Ergene =

Turkish actress and former model (born 1985)

- Born: 22 January 1985 (age 41); Hamburg, West Germany
- Occupations: Actress, model, fashion designer
- Years active: 2002–2009; 2019; 2026–
- Spouse: İzzet Özilhan (m. 2011; div. 2025)
- Children: 2
- Relatives: Sevinç Kıranlı (cousin)

Yasemin Ergene (born 22 January 1985) is a Turkish actress and former model.

== Life and career ==
She was born in West Germany on 22 January 1985. At the age of three, she returned to Turkey with her family. After completing her education in the Şarköy district of Tekirdağ, she moved to Istanbul and enrolled at the Müjdat Gezen Art Center. While studying there, she was directed toward on-screen acting by her instructor, Müjdat Gezen. She played the character Eylül in the television series Koçum Benim. She is known for playing Ekin Serbest Teksoy in the series Aşk Oyunu and Ela Altındağ in the series Doktorlar. Ergene, who graduated from Istanbul Bilgi University with a degree in Public Relations, married businessman İzzet Özilhan on July 16, 2011. She has two daughters: Emine, born in 2012, and Ela, born in 2013. On 3 September 2025, she announced that she had divorced her husband, İzzet Özilhan.

Ergene has not worked as an actress since 2009, but in 2019 she made a guest appearance as Doctor Ela in the television series Mucize Doktor. She is a cousin of actress Sevinç Kıranlı.

== Filmography ==
Year	Title	Role	Type
2002–2003	Koçum Benim	Eylül	Television series
2003	Vizontele Tuuba	Aynur	Film
2004	Çocuğun Var Derdin Var	Sibel	Television series
2004	Ah Be İstanbul	Esra	Television series
2005	Hırsız Var!	model	Film
2005	Aşk Oyunu	Ekin Serbest Teksoy	Television series
2006–2010	Doktorlar	Dr. Ela Altındağ	Television series
2008	Babam Adam Olacak	Yeşim	Television series
2019	Mucize Doktor	Dr. Ela Altındağ	Television series
2026	Tuzlu Kahve	Elit İpekli	Television series
