= Khayali =

Poet

K̲h̲ayālī Mehmed Bey (died at Edirne in 1556), nicknamed Bekār Memi ("Memi the Bachelor"), was an Ottoman poet born in Yenice-i Vardar (modern Giannitsa, Greece). He was a bitter enemy of poet Yahya Bey.
