= Siyah Beyaz Aşk =

- Also known as: Price of Passion
- Genre: Drama; Romance
- Written by: Eylem Canpolat; Sema Ergenekon
- Directed by: Yasin Uslu
- Starring: İbrahim Çelikkol; Birce Akalay; Muhammet Uzuner; Arzu Gamze Kılınç; Ece Dizdar; Deniz Celiloğlu
- Country of origin: Turkey
- Original language: Turkish
- No. of seasons: 1
- No. of episodes: 32

Production
- Producers: Lale Eren; Ayşe Elif Durmaz
- Production location: Istanbul
- Running time: 120 minutes
- Production company: D Productions

Original release
- Network: Kanal D
- Release: October 16, 2017 – May 28, 2018

Siyah Beyaz Aşk (transl. Black and White Love) is a Turkish romantic drama television series starring İbrahim Çelikkol, Birce Akalay, Muhammet Uzuner, Arzu Gamze Kılınç, Ece Dizdar and Deniz Celiloğlu. It premiered on Kanal D on October 16, 2017 and concluded on May 28, 2018.

== Synopsis ==
When doctor Aslı decides to help out someone and sees something she shouldn’t have seen, she learns two things. One, she accidentally helped a mafia leader. Two, he wants to kill her. That drastically changes as Ferhat, the mafia leader finds out Aslı has a brother in the police department. Not wanting to make the situation worse Ferhat gives the doctor an ultimatum: Marry him and take his last name. Or die.

== Cast ==
| Actor | Role | Character Description |
|---|---|---|
| İbrahim Çelikkol | Ferhat Aslan | Yeter and Namik's son, Yiğit and Gülsüm's older half-brother, Necdet Aslan's adoptive son, and Asli's husband |
| Birce Akalay | Aslı Çınar Aslan | Cem's younger sister, Jülide's aunt, Ferhat's wife |
| Muhammet Uzuner | Namık Emirhan | Ferhat's biological father and mentor, Yeter's former lover, and Handan's brother |
| Arzu Gamze Kılınç | Yeter Aslan | Ferhat, Yiğit and Gülsüm's mother, Necdet's wife, Namik's former lover |
| Cahit Gök | Cüneyt Koçak | Vildan's husband, Gülsüm's former lover and biological father of baby Necdet |
| Ece Dizdar | İdil Yaman Emirhan | Namik's secretary and current lover |
| Deniz Celiloğlu | Yiğit Aslan | Yeter and Necdet's son, Gülsüm's older brother, Ferhat's younger half-brother, Suna's husband, and Özgür's father |
| Uğur Aslan | Cem Çınar | Asli's older brother, Ebru's lover |
| Sinem Ünsal | Gülsüm Aslan Adaklı | Yeter and Necdet's daughter, Yiğit's younger sister, Ferhat's younger half-sister, Abidin's wife and mother of baby Necdet |
| Özlem Zeynep Dinsel | Vildan Koçak | Cüneyt's wife, Ferhat's former lover, Handan's daughter, and Özge's mother |
| Timur Ölkebaş | Abidin Adaklı | Handan's son, Ferhat's cousin, Gülsüm's husband, and baby Necdet's adoptive father |
| Burcu Tuna | Suna Aslan | Yiğit's wife and Özgür's mother |
| Kadriye Kenter | Handan Adaklı | Namik's sister, Vildan and Abidin's mother |
| Fatih Topçuoğlu | Dilsiz | Ferhat's right hand and Hülya's lover |
| Ceyla Odman | Deniz Çolak | Asli's close friend |
| Burcu Cavrar | Hülya | maid in the Emirhan/Aslan household and Dilsiz's lover |
| Gökhan Soylu | Necdet Aslan | Ferhat's adoptive father, Yiğit and Gülsüm's father, Yeter's husband and baby Necdet's maternal grandfather and namesake |
| Selin Köseoğlu | Jülide | Asli and Cem's niece |
| Özgül Sağdıç | Ebru | Asli's former best friend and Cem's lover |
| Batuhan Davutoglu | Özgür Aslan | Yiğit and Suna's son |
| Roza Çelik | Özge Koçak | Vildan and Cüneyt's daughter, Handan's granddaughter |

== International broadcasting ==
- Vietnam - The series premiered on May 30, 2022, on VTV3 as Đam mê và trả giá.

== Remake ==
- Ukraine - This series was remade in Ukraine as Na tvoey storone (Я на твоєму боці), which aired on Domashnyi TV channel.
