= Aslı Enver =

Turkish actress (born 1984)

- Born: Aslı Enver or Ayten Aslı Enver (sources differ); 10 May 1984 (age 42); Redbridge, London, England
- Occupation: Actress
- Years active: 2002–present
- Spouses: Birkan Sokullu (m. 2012; div. 2015); Berkin Gökbudak (m. 2022)
- Children: 1

Aslı Enver (born 10 May 1984) is a British-born Turkish Cypriot actress. She is best known for her roles in several TV series including as Mine in Kavak Yelleri, as Ahu Kumral in Suskunlar and as Süreyya in İstanbullu Gelin. She is also known for her roles in Kayıp, Bana Artık Hicran De, Kardeşim Benim, Tamam mıyız? and Babil.

== Biography ==
Enver was born on 10 May 1984, in London, England, and lived there until she was 12 years old. Her father is a Turkish Cypriot who grew up in London and met and married Enver's mother there, while she was abroad for her studies. As a teenager, Aslı Enver won a song contest in London. She started theatre at Mujdat Gezen Art Centre in Istanbul. She studied at Pera Fine Arts High School and graduated in theatre studies from Haliç University. She had her first minor-guest role in Uzay Sitcomu. Later, she had a part in the hit young series Hayat Bilgisi and played the main character "Mine Ergun" in the popular youth series Kavak Yelleri (a remake of Dawson's Creek) for five seasons. She played as Ahu Kumral in Suskunlar which the first Turkish drama sold to the USA market for remake. She has acted in the movies Tamam mıyız? and Kardeşim Benim and starred in the TV series Kayıp, Bana Artık Hicran De, Mutlu Ol Yeter and Kış Güneşi.

== Personal life ==
On 13 July 2012, Enver married Birkan Sokullu. On 27 August 2015, they made a statement through their lawyers and announced their divorce.

In 2015, she became close to her Kardeşim Benim costar, Murat Boz, with whom she started a relationship in 2016. The couple broke up in May 2017. After a few months of reconciliation, they eventually ended their relationship in April 2018. In November 2018, they announced their reconciliation after 8 months of separation. However, they broke up again in October 2019.

On 12 November 2022, Enver married businessman Berkin Gökbudak. The couple's daughter, Elay, was born in July 2023.

Dolunay Soysert and Nilay Sorgüven are among her close friends.

In May 2020, she confirmed that she had been diagnosed with dyslexia at a young age.

== Filmography ==
Movies
Year	Title	Role	Note
2013	Tamam mıyız?	Beste	Leading role
2016	Kardeşim Benim	Zeynep Uysal	Leading role
2017	Öteki Taraf	Ece	Leading role
2022	Sen Yaşamaya Bak	Melisa	Leading role
Web
Year	Title	Role	Note
2023	Arayış	Nisan	Leading role
Short movies
Year	Title	Role	Note
2002	Ayna		
TV series
Year	Title	Role	Note
2002	Uzay Sitcomu		Guest
2005	Hayat Bilgisi	Hazal	Supporting role (episodes 88–115)
2007–2011	Kavak Yelleri	Mine Ergun	Main role
2012	Suskunlar	Ahu Kumral	Main role
2013–2014	Kayıp	Özlem Albayrak	Main role
2014	Bana Artık Hicran De	Hicran Eyüpoğlu	Main role
2015	Mutlu Ol Yeter	Zeynep Güzeltepe	Main role
2016	Kış Güneşi	Nisan Sayer	Main role
2017–2019	İstanbullu Gelin	Süreyya Deniz Boran	Main role
2020	Babil	Ayşe Karaali/Nihal	Main role
2025-	Enfes Bir Aksam (Old Money)	Nihal	Main role
Theatre
Year	Title	Role	Venue
2015	Contractions	Emma	Craft Theatre
2022	The Glass Menagerie	Laura	Craft Theatre
Music videos
Year	Title	Artist(s) / band	Notes
	"Ne Güzel Güldün"	Pinhani	Kavak Yelleri soundtrack
	"Sevmekten Usanmam"	Pinhani	Kavak Yelleri soundtrack
2016	"A Be Kaynana"	Murat Boz	Kardeşim Benim soundtrack
2016	"Güneye Giderken"	Murat Boz, Aslı Enver, Burak Özçivit	Kardeşim Benim soundtrack; sung by Boz, vocalized by Enver and Özçivit
2018	"Nasıl Anlatsam"	Aslı Enver	İstanbullu Gelin soundtrack; sung by Enver

Brand endorsement
Bepanthol
Yapı Kredi
Lescon
Molped
Mavi Yeşil
L'Oréal Paris
Penti
DeFacto
Bravo
Mercedes-Benz Türkiye

== Awards and nominations ==
Year	Award	Category	Work	Result
2016	Yıldız Technical University Business Club	Most Admired Theatre Actress of 2015	Contradictions	Won
2017	3rd Elele Avon Woman Awards	Actress of the Year	Contradictions	Nominated
2017	Yıldız Technical University Business Club	Most Admired Movie Actress of 2016	Kardeşim Benim	Won
2017	44th Pantene Golden Butterfly Awards	Best Actress	İstanbullu Gelin	Won
2017	6th Bilkent TV Awards	Best Drama Actress	İstanbullu Gelin	Won
2018	Marketing Turkey The One Awards	Female Advertising Face Award	İstanbullu Gelin	Won
2018	45th Pantene Golden Butterfly Awards	Best Actress	İstanbullu Gelin	Nominated
2020	46th Pantene Golden Butterfly Awards	Best Actress	İstanbullu Gelin	Nominated
2020	"8th Yeditepe Delik Odulleri" Yeditepe university	Best Actress of the year 2019	İstanbullu Gelin	Won
