= Yahya bey Dukagjini =

Ottoman poet and military leader (1488–1582)

Dukaginzâde Yahyâ bey
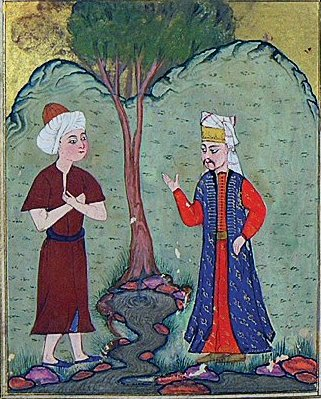
- Yahya bey Dukagjini in Âşık Çelebi’s Meşâirü’ş-şuarâ
- Born: 1488; Albania
- Died: 1582 (mostly accepted)
- Education: Acemi oglan
- Occupations: Poet, military
- Writing career
- Language: Ottoman Turkish
- Movement: Diwan poetry

Yahya bey Dukagjini (1488–1582; Turkish: Dukaginzâde Yahyâ bey or Turkish: Taşlıcalı Yahyâ bey, and Albanian: Jahja bej Dukagjini) was an Albanian poet and military figure. He is known for his Ottoman Turkish diwan poems of the 16th century.

In his youth, Dukagjini was recruited as a poet via the Ottomans' devşirme. He acted as a military figure, serving as a bölükbaşı. He participated in the 1514 Battle of Chaldiran, the 1516–17 Ottoman–Mamluk War, the Baghdad expedition of 1535, and the Siege of Szigetvár in 1566. Dukagjini was exiled after writing an elegy about Şehzade Mustafa, Suleiman the Magnificent's executed son. The elegy openly blamed the Grand Vizier, Rüstem Pasha, who exiled Dukagjini to the Balkans, where he spent his remaining life.

== Life ==
=== Origins ===
Yahya was born in 1488 or 1489, though his exact location of birth is unknown, but he was born somewhere in Northern Albania. Turkish poet Muallim Naci gave him the nickname "Taşlicali". A relative of the poet Dukaginzade Ahmed Bey, he decided to become a poet when he was recruited as a devşirme. Yahya was enlisted as a janissary. The Shihāb al-Dīn, gave him additional rights, allowing him to meet Kadri Efendy, Ibn Kemal, Nishandji Tadji-zade Dja'fer Çelebi, Pargalı Ibrahim Pasha, and İskender Çelebi.

=== Rise as a soldier and poet ===
Yahya Bey took part in the Battle of Chaldiran of 23 August 1514 during his youth, led by Sultan Selim I, as well as the Ottoman–Mamluk War of 1516–17 and Baghdad's expedition of 1535 under Sultan Suleiman. He earned the respect of major figures due to his poetry. Yahya was inspired by where he spent most of his early years, in Ottoman campaigns.

Khayali Mehmed Bey was an enemy of Yahya, another poet he met in 1536. He attacked Khayali Mehmed Bey satirically in his verses. Yahya wrote a qasida against him, giving it to the Sultan and Grand Vizier Rüstem Pasha during the Persian campaign, who was declared as "enemy of the poets". Rustem Pasha was said to be so enthralled with the level of contempt towards Khayali, and made Yahya administrator of several foundations in Bursa and Istanbul.

=== Exile and last years ===
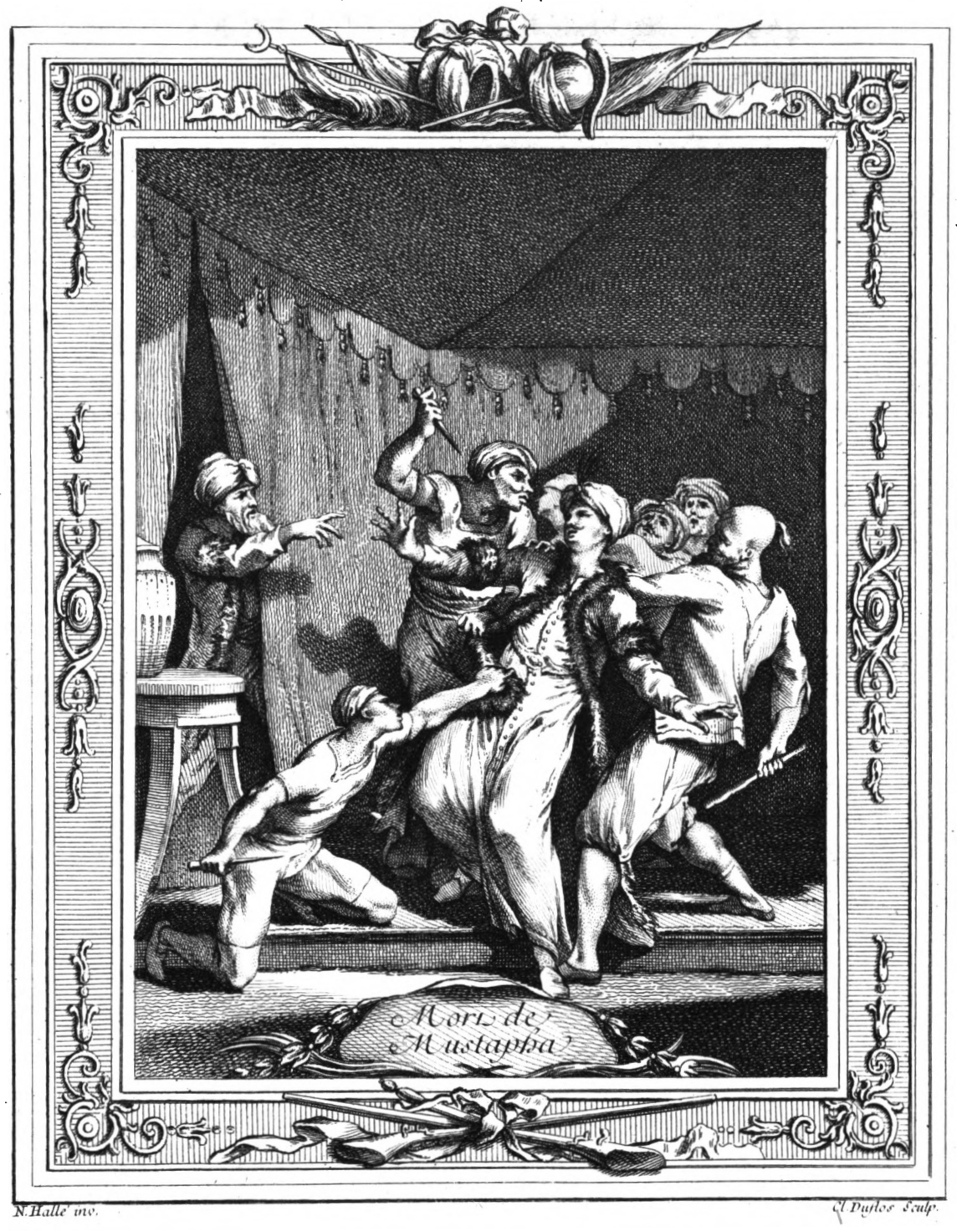
The strangling of Şehzade Mustafa, engraving by Claude Duflos, printed in Moeurs et usages des Turcs, leur religion, leur gouvernement civil, militaire et politique, avec un abregé de l'histoire Ottomane, vol.2, Coustelier, Paris, 1747. Yahya bey Dukagjini wrote Şehzade Mustafa's elegy

In 1553, near Ereğli, Konya, Suleiman the Magnificent, whilst on a military campaign to Iran, had his son, Şehzade (Prince) Mustafa executed based on intelligence he had received. Yahya wrote an elegy named Şehzade Mersiyesi (Prince's Dirge) about the murder, which received good reviews by the public. However, the planner behind the murder, Rüstem Pasha, did not enjoy the poem. He summoned Yahya and asked how he "dared to bewail one whom the Sultan had condemned". Yahya responded "we indeed condemned him with the Sultan, but we bewailed him with the people".

...

Yalancınun kuru bühtânı bugz-ı pinhânı / Akıtdı yaşumuzı yakdı nâr-ı hicrânı

(The slander and the secret grudge of the liars shed tears from our eyes; ignited the fire of separation}

Cinâyet itmedi cânî gibi anun cânı / Boguldı seyl-i belâya tagıldı erkânı

(He never murdered anybody, but his life was drowned in the flood of calamity, his comrades were disbanded}

N'olaydı görmeye idi bu mâcerâyı gözüm / Yazuklar ana revâ görmedi bu râyı gözüm

(I wish I had never seen this event. What a shame: my eyes didn't approve this treatment to him)

...

The Vizier did everything in his power get Yahya executed. However, the Sultan prohibited his execution but agreed to remove him from his offices. As a member of the askeri class, he apparently could not be left to starve. Yahya went to exile back in the Balkans to escape persecution, and wrote satirical lament on Rustem Pasha after his death. The location where he was sent is disputed. According to some sources, he took over a fief near Zvornik in today's Bosnia and lived pretty well afterwards receiving a 27,000 or 30,000 akçe annual income. Others point to Tamışvar, center of the Province of Temeşvar, where he for sure fought at a certain point. Though not young anymore, he took part together with his men at the siege of Szigetvar in 1565. There he wrote a qasida and presented it to Sultan Suleiman.

There is no consensus for Yahya bey's year of death. Most sources pointing to 1582, while others say 1575, 1573 (982 in IC), 1578-79 (986 in IC), or 1582 (990). His place of death also varies. Most sources indicate Loznica, Sanjak of Zvornik, some Timișoara in Romania. There are also claims that he was buried in Istanbul, while Bursalı Mehmet Tahir Bey and Muhamed Hadžijahić place also Loznica as place of death.

== Poetry ==
E.J.W.Gibb describes Yahya's poetry as just as interesting as his life was. Gibb praised Dukagjini as the one who won a position of real notability, over all non-Turks, Asiatics, and well as Europeans, who had attempted to write Turkish poetry. According to Gibb, there nothing in Dukagjini's language identifies him as a non-Constantinopolitan by birth or education. He added that there is a retained simplicity, vigor and originality in Dukagjini's writings. Gibb claims the originality shows in his poem Yusuf ve Züleyha. The subject is from Persian literature, which was so ubiquitous at the time, it was considered a universal theme, however, he rejects Yahya as a paraphraser, as he tells the story on a manner of his own.

As he declares himself in the epilogue of Yusuf ve Züleyha:

This fair book, this pearl of wisdom,
Is (of) my own imagining, for the most part;
Translation would not be fitting this story;
I would not take a dead men's sweetmeat into my mouth.

And also in Kitab-ı Usul's epilogue:

I have not translated the words of another,
I have not mixed with it [my poem] the words of strangers.
My tongue has not been the dragoman of the Persians,
I would not eat the food of dead Persians.

Dukagjini's main work is a vast diwan of poems and collection of five mesnevî poems. They lack the influence of Persian traditions, being put together in a Khamsa ("five poems"). The khamsa is credited as the most important section in Yahya's work. His most noteworthy poems are Shâh u gedâ (The King and the Beggar), which Gibb claims was his favorite, and which he says was written in one week, and Yusuf ve Züleyha (Yusuf and Züleyha), regarding the pure love and romance of two youths.

Whilst the first two poems of the khamse are mostly lyrical, the last three are derived from aphorisms on morality and the laws of life. Kitab-ı Usul is separated into 10 "stations" (maqām-s),: each attempting to instil moral qualities in reader, illustrated with anecdotes which demonstrate the pros of following certain moral paths. These anecdotes are descriptive, historic and fictitious, and are derived from an array of media. The following couplets are used as a refrain at the end of introductory cantos in most of the "stations", and elsewhere throughout the work:

What need for dispute, and what reason for strife?
By this Book of Precepts ordain thou thy life.

Gül-i Şadberk (Rose of a Thousand Petals) is a poem about the Prophet Muhammed's miracles, likely written when Yahya was of an old age, consisting of a pure religious tone. Gülşen-i Envar is divided into 40 short delimitations called "discourses".

His first two poems were published in diwan collections in Istanbul between 1867 and 1868.

Yahya's took inspiration from Sufi poet Mevlevî (also known as Rumi, Mevlânâ, or Jalāl ad-Dīn, founder of Mevlevi Order). Mevlevi is cited in some of Yahya's works.

Yahya also wrote "Şehrengiz" (City Book), where he describes the cities of Edirne and Istanbul.

=== Works ===
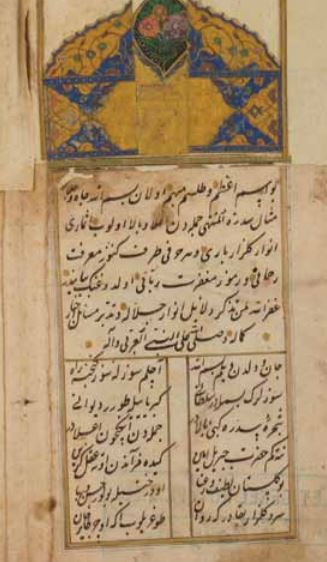
Extract from Gencine-i Raz, a diwan literature work of Yahya bey Dukagjini, National Manuscript Library, Istanbul

The following is a list of Yahya bey Dukajini's works:

- Diwan, printed in Istanbul in 1977 (selections from his Collected Poems were published by Mehmet Çavuşoğlu in 1983).
- Khamsa (Five Poems):
  1. Şah ü Geda - The King and the Beggar
  2. Yusuf ve Züleyha - Yusuf and Züleyha
  3. Gencine-i Raz - Treasure of Secret
  4. Gülşen-i Envar - Rose Garden of the Lights
  5. Kitab-ı Usul - Book of Procedures
- Şehrengiz-i İstanbul (City Book of İstanbul), published by Mehmet Çavuşoğlu in Türk Dili ve Edebiyatı Dergisi, 1969
- Şehrengiz-i Edirne (City Book of Edirne)

Two additional poems are usually attributed to Dukagjini:

- Nāz ü-Niyāz (Coyness and Yearning)
- Sulaimān-nāme (Book of Sulaiman: this poem is of around 2,000 verses, but left unfinished)

== Legacy ==
A courageous soldier, Dukagjini is noted for acting as a type which admirably combined the sword with the pen. His independence merged with his courage was his most notable trait. Yahya Bey is considered today as one of the greatest Ottoman diwan poets of the time.

== In popular culture ==
Yahya bey Dukagjini is depicted in the Turkish TV series Muhteşem Yüzyıl (The Magnificent Century), performed by Serkan Altunorak.

== Notes ==
a: Prince Mustafa Elegy - verses 4-6.
b: English translation original by Elias John Wilkinson Gibb.
