= Mucize Doktor =

Turkish television romantic medical drama series

- Turkish: Mucize Doktor
- Genre: Drama; Romance; Medical drama
- Based on: Good Doctor, 2013 South Korean television series
- Written by: Pınar Bulut; Onur Koralp
- Directed by: Yusuf Pirhasan (ep. 1–48, 64); Aytaç Çiçek (ep. 2–28, 30–53); Volkan Keskin (ep. 53); Yağız Alp Akaydın (ep. 54–60); Altan Dönmez (ep. 61–64)
- Starring: Taner Ölmez; Onur Tuna; Sinem Ünsal; Reha Özcan; Hazal Türesan; Murat Aygen
- Composer: Aytekin Ataş
- Country of origin: Turkey
- Original language: Turkish
- No. of seasons: 2
- No. of episodes: 64

Production
- Producer: Asena Bülbüloğlu
- Production location: Istanbul
- Running time: 130 minutes
- Production company: MF Yapım

Original release
- Network: FOX
- Release: September 12, 2019 – May 27, 2021

Mucize Doktor is a Turkish romantic medical drama series composed of 64 episodes divided into two seasons, that broadcast on FOX between September 12, 2019 to May 27, 2021. It is a remake of the South Korean serial Good Doctor, which also inspired the American adaptation The Good Doctor and the Japanese adaptation Good Doctor.

== Synopsis ==
Alì Vefa is a young doctor with autism spectrum disorders associated with savant syndrome. As a child he was bullied by his classmates and socially ignored by his peers, because due to his condition he was introverted and refused physical contact. The only person to be close to him is his brother, with whom he creates a bond of trust. His brother believes in him a lot, especially when his father kills his pet rabbit, which he takes to a private clinic in vain. It is there that Alì meets Doctor Adil, who will later become his legal guardian. Alì will fall in love with surgical medicine. His brother has a lot of faith in him in this regard, and after a tragic event, Ali sets himself the goal of becoming a surgeon. He is hired on a trial basis at the Berhayat hospital, where he finds himself facing resistance from the other doctors, especially that of Doctor Ferman, who does not consider him suitable for the role. Alì, despite the initial difficulties, manages to be accepted by many members of the Berhayat hospital, including Ferman, with whom he forms a bond of brotherhood, and Nazlı, the only one who initially tries to understand him and establish a relationship within the hospital. a bond of friendship with him.

== Cast ==
=== Main characters ===
Actor/Actress	Character	Episodes
Taner Ölmez	Alì Vefa	1–64
Onur Tuna	Ferman Eryiğit	1–64
Sinem Ünsal	Nazlı Gülengül	1–64
Hazal Türesan	Beliz Boysal	1–64
Murat Aygen	Tanju Korman	1–64
Hayal Köseoğlu	Açelya Dingin	1–64
Bihter Dinçel	Selvi Ustagil	1–64
Merve Bulut	Gülin Şenalp	1–64
Fırat Altunmeşe	Demir Aldırmaz	1–56
Reha Özcan	Adil Erinç	1–50
Korhan Herduran	Güneş Yılmaz	1–45
Hakan Kurtaş	Doruk Özütürk	29–64
Özge Özder	Kıvılcım Boysal	1–29
Zerrin Tekindor	Vuslat Kozoğlu	46–64
Ezgi Asaroğlu	Ezo Kozoğlu	40–54
Seda Bakan	Ferda Erinç	30–42
Serkan Keskin	Muhsin Korunmaz	57–64
Merve Dizdar	Damla Kıyak	25–28

=== Secondary characters ===
Actor/Actress	Character	Episodes
Adin Külçe	Alì Vefa as a child	1–64
Berk Tuna Toktamışoğlu	Ahmet Vefa	1–64
Hülya Aydın	Gülcan Vefa	1–28
Cenan Çamyurdu	Hikmet Vefa	1–28
Dilek Köse	Fatoş Eryiğit	13–14, 19, 56
Yasemin Özilhan	Ela Altındağ	14-15
Beren Gökyıldız	Betüş Aydinli	18-21
Ipek Çiçek	Kübra Aydinli	18-21
Kemal Başar	Süleyman Aldırmaz	20-22
Hasan Küçükçetin	Efkan	24
Serhat Barış	Raci	29
Cengiz Tangör	Haluk Hoca	30-31
Edip Saner	İsmet Gülengül	34–37, 64
Ada Mina Küçük	Suna Korman	63–64
Ecem Simge Yurdatapan	Harika Turşucuzade	63–64

Yasemin Özilhan played main role Ela Altındağ in other medical series Doktorlar.

Özge Özpirinçci, who earned fame by portraying protagonist Bahar Çesmeli from Kadin, reprises her character as a guest in Mucize Doktor.

== Episodes ==
=== Series overview ===
Season	Episodes	Originally released	
Season	Episodes	First released	Last released
1	28	September 12, 2019	March 26, 2020
2	36	September 17, 2020	May 27, 2021

== Production ==
The series is directed by Yusuf Pirhasan, Aytaç Çiçek, Volkan Keskin, Yağız Alp Akaydın and Altan Dönmez, written by Pınar Bulut and Onur Koralp and produced by MF Yapım.

=== Filming ===
Filming took place at the Medical Park Hospital in Istanbul's Pendik district, while other scenes were filmed in Bilecik and the villages of Küplü, Başköy, Dereköy and Gülümbe.

== Awards ==
Year	Award	Category	Nominee	Result	Reference
2019	Altın Objektif Awards	Drama Series of the Year	Mucize Doktor	Won	
2020	Golden Butterfly Awards	Best series	Mucize Doktor	Won	
2020	Golden Butterfly Awards	Best actor	Taner Ölmez	Won	
2020	Golden Butterfly Awards	Best director	Yusuf Pirhasan	Won	
2020	Yeditepe Wish Awards	Best series	Mucize Doktor	Won	
2020	Yeditepe Wish Awards	Best actor	Taner Ölmez	Won	
