= Babil (TV series) =

- Babil season 2 poster
- Genre: Crime; Drama; Psychological thriller
- Written by: Nükhet Bıçakçı; Özlem Yücel
- Directed by: Uluç Bayraktar
- Starring: Halit Ergenç; Ozan Güven; Aslı Enver; Birce Akalay; Nur Fettahoğlu; Mesut Akusta; Onur Saylak
- Composer: Toygar Işıklı
- Country of origin: Turkey
- Original language: Turkish
- No. of seasons: 2
- No. of episodes: 20

Production
- Producer: Kerem Çatay
- Production location: Istanbul
- Running time: 130 minutes
- Production company: Ay Yapım

Original release
- Network: Star TV
- Release: 17 January – 20 November 2020

Babil is a Turkish psychological thriller television series signed by Ay Yapım, the first episode of which was broadcast on 17 January 2020, directed by Uluç Bayraktar, and written by Nükhet Bıçakçı and Özlem Yücel. The series ended with the final in the 20th episode released on 20 November 2020.

== Cast and characters ==
=== Main characters ===
- İrfan Tuna Saygun (Halit Ergenç): An economics professor who does his best for Deniz, whom he thinks is his 7-year-old son. Ilay's ex.
- Egemen Kıvılcım (Onur Saylak / Ozan Güven): Irfan's childhood friend and best friend. Deniz's biological father.
- Ayşe Karaali/Nihal (Aslı Enver): The young girl who confronted İrfan when he was in trouble. She is the secret police who joined Süleyman to reveal his dark deeds. She later became İrfan and Egemen's assistant.
- İlay Yücedağ (Birce Akalay): Süleyman's love and İrfan's former love.
- Eda Saygun (Nur Fettahoğlu): Irfan's wife, Deniz's mother.
- Süleyman Yavuncu (Mesut Akusta): Kudret's husband. Ilay's lover and dark businessman.
- Deniz Saygun (Beren Kasımoğulları): adoptive son of İrfan, actually Egemen's son.

=== Supporting characters ===
- Hakan Yavuncu (Selahattin Paşalı): Son of Süleyman and Kudret.
- Kudret Yavuncu (Veda Yurtsever): Süleyman's wife, who is very jealous of him.
- Funda (Lesli Karavil): Eda's older sister who knows all her secrets.
- Saffet (Abdurrahman Yunusoğlu): Funda's husband.
- Sedat (Barış Aksavaş): The commissioner who works together with Ayşe/Nihal to end Süleyman.
- Yalçın (Mert Doğan): Süleyman's man.
- Mert (Gürberk Polat): İrfan's student from university. He does his best to win İrfan's attention.
- Nehir Yücedağ (Gizem Kala): Ilay's younger sister. She blames her sister for what she went through.
- Demet (Gözde Kocaoğlu): Ilay's assistant.
- Büşra (Şeniz Çetin): Kudret's assistant.
- Buse (Damlasu İkizoğlu): Nihal's younger sister.

== Overview ==
| Series | Episodes | Originally released | | |
| Series | Episodes | First released | Last released | Network |
|---|---|---|---|---|
| 1 | 10 | 17 January 2020 | 27 March 2020 | Star TV |
| 2 | 10 | 11 September 2020 | 20 November 2020 | Star TV |
