= Karadağlar =

- Written by: Alican Yaraş
- Directed by: Oğuzhan Tercan
- Starring: Erdal Özyağcılar; Hatice Şendil; İbrahim Çelikkol; Korel Cezayirli; Refik Sağyaşar; Ahmet Rıfat Şungar; Gökhan Mete; Güzim Özyağcılar; Erdoğan Siçak
- Country of origin: Turkey
- Original language: Turkish

Production
- Producer: Med Yapım
- Production locations: Küçükkuyu, Ayvacık, Çanakkale
- Running time: 90 min.

Original release
- Network: Show TV
- Release: November 8, 2010

Karadağlar (Turkish for "black mountains") is a Turkish television drama loosely based on the 1880 novel The Brothers Karamazov by Fyodor Dostoyevsky. It airs on Show TV every week on Monday evenings at 20:00 local time, and is repeated on Wednesdays at 23:00, as well as on Sundays at 16:45.

== Overview ==
Karadağlar is set in the 1930s, when Turkey was suffering the effects of the Great Depression, and it focuses on the generally strained relationships of the landowner, Halit Karadağ, with his sons, as well as the relationships between his sons. Set in the fictional village of Payidar, the series also shows the tensions that exist between the area's rich landowners and poor villagers.

== Cast ==
=== Main characters ===
| Actor | Character in Karadağlar | Corresponding character in The Brothers Karamazov |
|---|---|---|
| Erdal Özyağcılar | Halit Karadağ | Fyodor Pavlovich Karamazov |
| İbrahim Çelikkol | Gülali Karadağ | Dmitri Fyodorovich Karamazov |
| Korel Cezayirli | Kadir Karadağ | Aleksey Fyodorovich Karamazov |
| Burak Sağyaşar | Selahattin Karadağ | Ivan Fyodorovich Karamazov |
| Ahmet Rıfat Şungar | Cemal | Pavel Fyodorovich Smerdyakov |
| Hatice Şendil | Gülhayat | Agrafena Alexandrovna Svetlova |
| Zeynep Özyağcılar | Nazlı | Katerina Ivanovna Verkhovtseva |
| Gökhan Mete | Seyit | Grigory Vasilyevich Kutuzov |
| Güzin Özyağcılar | Esma Kadın | Marfa Ignatyevna |
| Hale Akınlı | Marika | |
| Aliona Bozbey | Zuhal | |
| Erdoğan Siçak | Nihat | |

== Episodes ==
| No. | Title | Air date |
|---|---|---|
| 1 | Episode 1 | 8 November 2010 |
| 2 | Episode 2 | 15 November 2010 |
| 3 | Episode 3 | 22 November 2010 |
| 4 | Episode 4 | 29 November 2010 |
| 5 | Episode 5 | 6 December 2010 |
| 6 | Episode 6 | 13 December 2010 |
| 7 | Episode 7 | 20 December 2010 |
| 8 | Episode 8 | 27 December 2010 |
| 9 | Episode 9 | 3 January 2011 |
Zuhal and Kadir fall out over Kadir's insistence on returning home. Selahattin is tortured by men hired by his father. Halit is told by Cemal that Gülhayat went with Gülali to his home. Gülali starts a fight in Marika's nightclub.
| 10 | Episode 10 | 10 January 2011 |
| 11 | Episode 11 | 17 January 2011 |
| 12 | Episode 12 | 24 January 2011 |
| 13 | Episode 13 | 31 January 2011 |
Kadir has doubts about his marriage to Zuhal once again. Selahattin prevents Nazlı from committing suicide. Halit proposes to Gülhayat and is accepted by her, although she has revenge rather than romance in mind. He also hires Nafiz to kill Gülali. Halit and Gülhayat begin their wedding, but some unknown person is pointing a gun at Halit.
| 14 | Episode 14 | 7 February 2011 |
Halit is shot at his wedding ceremony just after Gülhayat refuses to marry him. He later recovers, and suspects one of his sons of having shot him. Selahattin proposes to Nazlı. She reluctantly accepts his proposal, but comes to regret having accepted it at all. Gülhayat tries to return to Gülali, who Nafiz has failed to kill, but he spurns her, and she tactically makes peace with Halit.
