= Filinta =

- Genre: Historic; Detective fiction
- Based on: Filinta Galata by Tamer Çıray
- Starring: Onur Tuna; Cem Uçan; Damla Aslanalp; Mehmet Özgür
- Composer: Tamer Çıray
- Country of origin: Turkey
- Original language: Turkish
- No. of seasons: 2
- No. of episodes: 56 (149 on YouTube shortened)

Production
- Executive producers: Yusuf Esenkal; Serdar Öğretici
- Production location: Turkey

Original release
- Release: December 23, 2014 – April 22, 2016

Related
- Payitaht: Abdülhamid

Filinta is a Turkish detective fiction television drama series created for TRT1 by Yusuf Esenkal and Serdar Öğretici. Filmed in Seka Park Film studio, it was shot in İzmit in the largest film set ever built in the history of Turkish TV series.

The series, the first detective TV fiction set in the Ottoman period, premiered on TRT1 in Turkey on December 23, 2014. It aired until 2016. As of 2017 it was one of the most expensive television series in Turkey. According to The Hollywood Reporter, a source described Filinta as "like a crude Ottoman Downton Abbey".

== Cast ==
Actor/Actress	Character
Onur Tuna	Filinta Mustafa
Cem Uçan	Bıçak Ali
Mehmet Özgür	Kadi Gıyaseddin
Damla Aslanalp	Lara Zaharyas
Nur Fettahoğlu	Süreyya
Berrak Tüzünataç	Farah
Feyza Işık	Gülbahar
Kayra Şenocak	Hasan
Kamil Güler	Abdullah Efendi
Serhat Tutumluer	Boris Zaharyas
Ercan Demirel	Hamdi Agha
Hakan Yufkacıgil	Çemil Efendi
Hakan Kurtaş	Sultan Abdul Hamid
Yosi Misrahi	Esat Pasha
Naz Elmas	Azize
Reshad Strik	Lütfü
Wilma Elles	Anita Von Wilhelm
Duru Alkış	Neslihan Sultan
Serhan Ernak	Çeyrek
Kemal Zeydan	Zeyrek
Kaan Urgancıoğlu	Otto Petroviç
Ali Savaşçı	Cardinal Fernando
Ceyhun Erçin	Çelebi Rıza
Uğur Yıldıran	Garbis

== Production ==
In 2014 Bobby Roth directed extra scenes for the series. "The series' set is one ot Europe's largest television sets and includes an exact replica of the old city of Pera, including its tram; it was built on a 40,000 m2 set (on a 300,000 m2 plot) in Izmit"

== Spinoff ==
The characters of Zeyrek and Çeyrek reappear in he spinoff comedy series Zeyrek ile Çeyrek .

== Reception ==
President of Turkey Recep Tayyip Erdoğan and his wife Emine have visited the production set, congratulating the production team.

== See also ==
Other productions by Eastern Sunrise Films:

- Payitaht: Abdülhamid
- The Ottoman Lieutenant
