= Serkan Altunorak =

Turkish actor

- Born: 24 December 1976 (age 49); Ankara, Turkey
- Education: Hacettepe University; Mimar Sinan University
- Occupation: Actor
- Years active: 1999–present

Serkan Altunorak (born 24 December 1976) is a Turkish actor. He is best known for Melekler Korusun, Muhteşem Yüzyıl, and Cesur ve Güzel.

== Life and career ==
Altunorak is a graduate of Hacettepe University with a degree in theatre studies. He later studied master of performing arts and graduated from Mimar Sinan University Conservatory. He studied in The Juilliard School Language and Acting Training, Cambridge School of Institute, Long Island University language and Depaul University MFA Department of Drama. Also, he is voice actor in many films.

He made his debut on television in 1999 with his role in hit sitcom Ayrılsak da Beraberiz as Unisex Bekir. In 2006 he appeared in İmkansız Aşk as Cem, and in the same year played the role of Tolga in the movie Gomeda, which marked his cinematic debut. In 2007 he was cast in Kara Duvak as Merdan. In the following year, he appeared in the youth series Sınıf as Umut and also had the lead role in the adaptation of Mercury Fur in Turkey.

In 2009 he portrayed a conservatory teacher in the popular series Melekler Korusun and went on stage again with a role in the play Alışveriş ve S***ş.

In the meantime he play in Sezen Aksu's music video "Yanmışım Sönmüşüm Ben", directed by Fatih Akın. He also made guest appearances in the TV series Yaseminname, Çocuklar Duymasın and Karım ve Annem.

In October 2006, he had to play Russian roulette in a scene of the TV series İmkansız Aşk, in which he starred with Ebru Gündeş. Altunorak, who put the gun to his head, collapsed to the ground in blood as soon as he pulled the trigger. He was seriously injured as the pistol was still loaded and he was treated for a long time. The series was subsequently cancelled.

In 2011, he had the role of Suat in period series Bir Günah Gibi which based from novel "Kurt Seyit ve Murka". He had his breakthrough with his portrayal of Taşlıcalı Yahya in the historical drama series Muhteşem Yüzyıl.

== Filmography ==
=== Streaming series ===
Streaming series
Year	Title	Role
2017	7 Yüz	Metin
2022	Uysallar	Suat Uysal
2022	Zeytin Ağacı	Selim
TBA	Numen	

=== TV series ===
Television
Year	Title	Role
1999	Ayrılsak da Beraberiz	Unisex Bekir
2005	Karım ve Annem	Orkun
2006	İmkansız Aşk	Cem
2007	Kara Duvak	Merdan
2008	Sınıf	Umut
2009–2010	Melekler Korusun	Erkan
2011	Bir Günah Gibi	Suat
2013	Şüphe	Tarık
2012–2014	Muhteşem Yüzyıl	Taşlıcalı Yahya
2015	Evli ve Öfkeli	Tarık Sönmez
2016–2017	Cesur ve Güzel	Bülent Aydınbaş
2017–2018	Aşkın Kanunu	Vedat
2018	Vatanım Sensin	Monsieur Dule
2021	Sana Söz	Erdem Karaca
2022	Evlilik Hakkında Her Şey	Bora Göktaş
2023–	Maviye Sürgün	Ozan

=== Film ===
Film
Year	Title	Role
2006	Gomeda	Tolga
2008	Roz'un Sonbaharı	Metin
2018	Cebimdeki Yabancı	Metin

=== As voice actor ===
Film	Role	Notes
Lucky Luke	Rantanplan	Turkish voiceover
Life with Louie	Glen Glenn	Turkish voiceover
Looney Tunes	Bugs Bunny	Turkish voiceover
Richie Rich	Richie Rich	Turkish voiceover
Smallville	Clark Kent	Turkish voiceover

== Theatre ==
Theatre
Year	Title	Role	Venue
2007	Mercury Fur	Elliot	DOT
2008	Shoot/Get Treasure/Repeat	Mikado	DOT
2009	Alışveriş ve S***ş	Mark	DOT
2014	Dövüş Gecesi		DOT
2018	Killology		Craft Theatre
2021	The Taming of the Shrew	Petruchio	Zorlu Performing Arts Center

== Awards and nominations ==
Year	Award	Category	Work	Notes	Result
2008	Sadri Alışık Awards	Efes Pilsen Youth Special Award	Mercury Fur	shared with the cast	Won
2010	Sadri Alışık Awards	Selection Committee Special Award	Alışveriş ve S***ş	shared with the cast	Won
2018	23rd Sadri Alışık Theatre and Cinema Awards	Most Successful Actor of the Year	Killology		Nominated
2018	18th Pillars Audience Awards	Small Hall Actor Award	Killology		Won
