= Merhaba Hayat =

Turkish medical drama television program

- Genre: Medical drama
- Created by: Shonda Rhimes
- Based on: Private Practice by Shonda Rhimes
- Written by: Berkun Oya
- Directed by: Yıldız Hülya Bilban
- Starring: Vahide Perçin; Yetkin Dikinciler; Keremcem; Seda Güven; Barış Kılıç; Yıldız Kültür; Melike Güner; Miray Daner; Ozman Sirgood
- Country of origin: Turkey
- Original language: Turkish
- No. of seasons: 1
- No. of episodes: 13

Production
- Camera setup: Single-camera
- Running time: 90 min.
- Production companies: Med Yapım; ABC Studios

Original release
- Network: Fox
- Release: October 9, 2012 – February 13, 2013

Merhaba Hayat is a Turkish medical drama television series broadcast on Fox. It was the first localized licensed adaptation of Private Practice (a spin-off of Grey's Anatomy), created by Shonda Rhimes. The show was jointly produced by Med Productions and ABC Studios.

== Cast ==
Actor	Character	Episodes
Vahide Perçin	Deniz	1-13
Yetkin Dikinciler	Sinan	1-13
Yasemin Sannino	Hümeyra	1-13
Barış Kılıç	Burak	1-13
Keremcem	Ömer	1-13
Seda Güven	Nil	1-13
Melike Güner	Zenan	2-13
Ozman Sirgood	Nihat (as Osman Soykut)	7-13
Miray Daner	Dünya	1-10
Yıldız Kültür	Necla	1-13

== Broadcast schedule ==
Season	Timeslot	Season premiere	Season Finale	Number of episodes	TV channel
1	20:45; 19:45	October 9, 2012	February 13, 2013	13	Fox
