= No 309 =

Turkish TV series

No: 309
- Original Turkish poster
- Turkish: No: 309
- Genre: Comedy
- Created by: Asli and Banu Zengin
- Directed by: Halsan Tolga Pulat
- Starring: Demet Özdemir; Furkan Palalı; Sumru Yavrucuk; Erdal Özyağcılar
- Country of origin: Turkey
- Original language: Turkish
- No. of seasons: 2
- No. of episodes: 65

Production
- Production company: Gold Film

Original release
- Network: Fox TV
- Release: 1 June 2016 – 25 October 2017

No: 309 (Turkish: No: 309), is a Turkish romantic comedy television series created by Aslı and Banu Zengin for Fox TV that premiered on 1 June 2016, and concluded on 25 October 2017. The series stars Demet Özdemir and Furkan Palalı.

== Plot ==
In a video played after his death, an elderly millionaire speaks to his entire family. In it, he declares that the first grandchild to marry and have a child will get his share of the family company. Desperate to get that fortune, mothers rush to set up blind dates for their children. Obliged by his mother, Onur goes to his blind date. There he meets Lale, who was there for her blind date with a young doctor also called Onur. The blind date becomes a wild night full of fun and craziness, where both end up getting drunk and spending the night in room 309 of a hotel. In the morning, unable to remember anything about what happened last night, both say goodbye and agree never to see each other again. However, three months later, Lale discovers that she is pregnant with Onur's baby so she and Onur have to get married and divorce when the baby is born so Onur can claim the money. However, after getting married they catch feelings and raise their baby boy Emir.

== Cast ==
- Demet Özdemir as Lale Yenilmez Sarıhan
- She is Onur's wife.
- (Bölüm 1 - Bölüm 65)
- Furkan Palalı as Onur Sarıhan
- He is Lale's husband.
- (Bölüm 1 - Bölüm 65)
- Sumru Yavrucuk as Songül Yenilmez
- She is Yıldırım's ex-wife.
- (Bölüm 1 - Bölüm 65)
- Erdal Özyağcılar as Yıldırım Yenilmez
- He is Songül's ex-husband.
- (Bolüm 60 - Bölüm 65)
- Nurşim Demir as İsmet Sarıhan
- She is the wife of the late Ahmet Sarıhan.
- (Bolüm 1 - Bölüm 65)
- Gökçe Özyol as Kurtuluş Yorulmaz
- He is Nilüfer's husband.
- (Bolüm 1 - Bölüm 65)
- Cihan Ercan as Erol Sarıhan
- He is Filiz's husband.
- (Bolüm 1 - Bölüm 65)
- Özlem Tokaslan as Yıldız Sarıhan
- She is Fikret's wife.
- (Bölüm 1 - Bölüm 65)
- Suat Sungur as Fikret Sarıhan
- He is Yıldız's husband.
- (Bölüm 1 - Bölüm 65)
- Sevinç Erbulak as Betül Sarıhan
- She is Șadi's wife.
- (Bölüm 1 - Bölüm 65)
- Beyti Engin as Şadi Sarıhan
- He is Betül's husband.
- (Bölüm 1 - Bölüm 65)
- Fatma Toptaş as Nilüfer Yorulmaz
- She is Kurtuluş's wife.
- (Bölüm 1 - Bölüm 65)
- Erdem Koncaoğlu as Emir Sarıhan
- He is the son of Lale and Onur.
- (Bolüm 37 - Bölüm 47)
- (Bolüm 49 - Bölüm 54)
- (Bolüm 56 - Bolüm 60)
- İrem Helvacıoğlu as Pelinsu Yalın
- She is Onur's ex-fiancée.
- (Bolüm 1 - Bölüm 40)
- Pelin Uluksar as Nergis Yenilmez
- She is Samet's girlfriend.
- (Boüm 1 - Bölüm 65)
- Murat Tavlı as Samet Yetiş
- He is Nergis's boyfriend.
- (Bolüm 1 - Bölüm 59)
- Ceren Taşçı as Filiz Sarıhan
- She is Erol's wife.
- (Bölüm 1 - Bölüm 65)
- Özlem Ulukan as Șerife
- (Bolüm 1 - Bölüm 65)
- Selen Sesen as Sedef
- She is the housekeeper in Yıldız and Fikret's house.
- (Bolüm 1 - Bölüm 65)
- Dilek Çelebi as Hulya
- (Bolüm 56 - Bolüm 65)
- Tuğçe Kursunoğlu as Özge Derin
- (Bolüm 60 - Bolüm 65)
- Yavuz Seçkin as Pinar
- (Bolüm 47 - Bölüm 48)
- (Bolüm 50 - Bolüm 54)
- (Bolüm 56 - Bolüm 58)
- Kemal Pekser as Koray
- (Bolüm 38 - Bolüm 48)
- Fatih Ayhan as Doctor Onur Saygın
- (Bolüm 1 - Bolüm 35)
- Eda Özel as Şebnem Yalın
- (Bolüm 1 - Bolüm 32)
- Ünal Silver as Halük
- (Bolüm 20 - Bölüm 32)
- Ömrüm Nur Çamçakallı as Gülşah Yorulmaz
- (Bolüm 1 - Bölüm 65)

== International broadcasting ==
- Bulgaria - The series was broadcast, starting on October 7, 2017, on Diema Family.
- Vietnam - The series broadcast on VTV3, premiered on October 27, 2022 and ended on August 3, 2023 as Phòng 309.
- Russia - The series was broadcast on FOX Life now known as FX Life as Номер 309 on 1 March 2018.
- Israel - The series was broadcast on Turkish Drama Channel, premiered on August 16, 2020, as חדר 309".
