= Murat Ünalmış =

Turkish actor

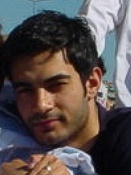
- Born: 23 April 1981 (age 45); Kayseri, Turkey
- Occupation: Actor
- Spouses: Birce Akalay (m. 2011; div. 2012) Nutiye Akar (m. 2023)
- Children: 2

Murat Ünalmış (born 23 April 1981) is a Turkish actor.

== Life and career ==
Ünalmış spent his childhood in Kayseri before moving to Istanbul to attend secondary school. During his high school years, he played for the basketball team of Fenerbahçe S.K. After graduating from Marmara University with a degree in communication studies, Ünalmış studied acting at Academy Istanbul.

Shortly after finishing his studies, he appeared in a number of TV series, including Hayat Bağları, Sınırlı Aşk, and Kurşun Yarası as well as movies such as Üç Kadın, Deli Duran, and Sen Ne Dilersen. Her breakthrough came with a role in Mahsun Kırmızıgül's Güneşi Gördüm. He later appeared in another film directed by Kırmızıgül, titled New York'ta Beş Minare.

Ünalmış also had a leading role in the series Yer Gök Aşk. He was then cast in TRT 1's Sevda Kuşun Kanadında. With Uğur Güneş, İbrahim Çelikkol, he played in the mini historical series Seddülbahir 32 Saat. In 2018, he got the leading role in the period drama series Bir Zamanlar Çukurova.

== Filmography ==
Web series
Year	Title	Role	Notes
2016	Seddülbahir 32 Saat	Mahmut Sabri	
TV series
Year	Title	Role	Notes
2003	Sınırlı Aşk		
2003	Kurşun Yarası	Seyit	Supporting role
2005	Deli Duran		Supporting role
2005	Üç Kadın		Supporting role
2005–2007	Şöhret	Mert Erdem	Leading role
2007	Sır Gibi	Mehmet	Leading role
2008	Rüzgâr	Poyraz	Leading role
2009–2010	Kasaba	Haydar	Leading role
2010–2012	Yer Gök Aşk	Yusuf Hancıoğlu	Leading role
2012	Babalar ve Evlatlar	Burhan	Leading role
2013–2014	İnadına Yaşamak	Ali Ayazlı	Leading role
2016	Sevda Kuşun Kanadında	Arif Ünlü	Leading role
2017	Deli Gönül	Mehmet Kadir Ölçek	Leading role
2018–2021	Bir Zamanlar Çukurova	Demir Yaman	Leading role
2023	Gülcemal	Gülcemal Şahin	Leading role
2026	Sevdan Bir Ateş	Mirza Kozaklı	Leading role
Film			Leading role
Year	Title	Role	Notes
2004	Celal Oğlan	Celal Oğlan	Leading role
2009	Gecenin Kanatları	Yusuf	Leading role
2009	Güneşi Gördüm	Mamo	Supporting role
2010	New York'ta Beş Minare	Ülkücü Reisi	Supporting role
