= Selin Yeninci =

Turkish actress (born 1988)

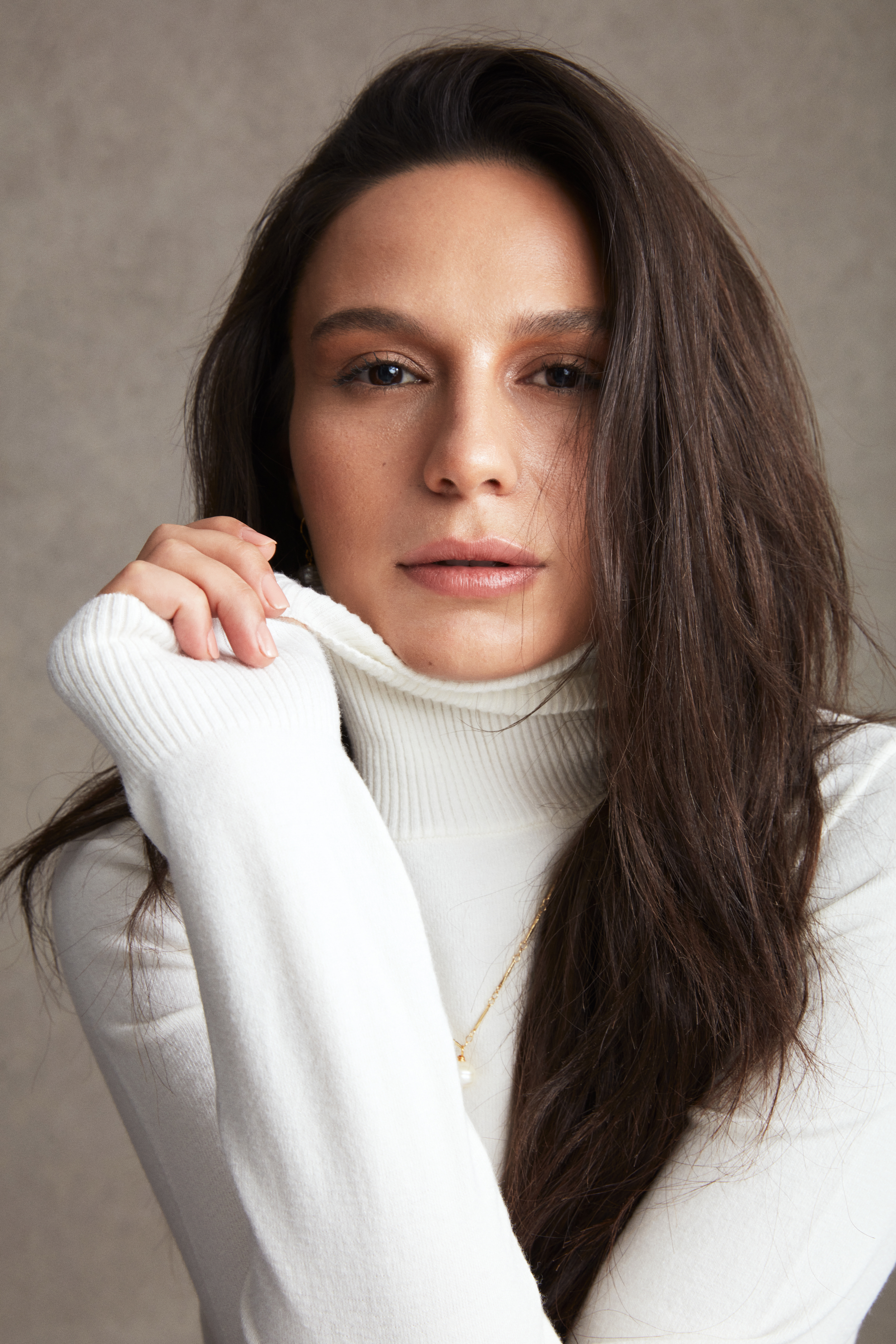
- Selin Yeninci
- Born: 16 January 1988 (age 37); Istanbul, Turkey
- Education: Dokuz Eylül University (School of Fine Arts)
- Occupation: Actress

Selin Yeninci (born 16 January 1988) is a Turkish actress.

== Life and career ==
Selin Yeninci was born on 16 January 1988 in Istanbul. Yeninci graduated from İzmir Atatürk High School in 2006, where she was the student head of the theatre department. In 2011, she finished her studies at Dokuz Eylül University School of Fine Arts. Following her graduation, Yeninci joined Oyun Atölyesi, where she acted alongside Haluk Bilginer in adaptations of Macbeth, La nuit de Valognes, etc. She rose to prominence with her role as Saniye in the TV series Bir Zamanlar Çukurova.

Yeninci is a recipient of two Best Supporting Actress awards from International Adana Film Festival and 53rd Turkish Film Critics Association Awards, respectively.

== Filmography ==
| Year | Title | Role | Notes |
|---|---|---|---|
| 2011 | Cennetin Sırları | | TV series |
| 2013 | Galip Derviş | | TV series |
| 2013–2014 | Vicdan | | TV series |
| 2014 | Toz Ruhu | Neslihan | Film |
| 2014 | Olur Olur | Ebru | Film |
| 2014 | Ah Neriman | Gönül | TV series |
| 2015 | Tatlı Küçük Yalancılar | | TV series |
| 2016 | Kaçın Kurası | Neşe | TV series |
| 2017 | Yüz Yüze | Melisa | TV series |
| 2018 | Avlu | Merve | TV series |
| 2018–2022 | Bir Zamanlar Çukurova | Saniye Taşkın | TV series |
| 2020 | Nasipse Adayız | Arzu | Film |
| 2021 | İlk ve Son | Gün | Web series |
| 2022 | Annenin Sırrıdır Çocuk | Meryem Kısmet | TV series |
| 2022 | Burning Days (Kurak Günler) | Zeynep | Film |

== Awards and nominations ==
| Year | Award | Category | Work | Result | Ref. |
|---|---|---|---|---|---|
| 2020 | International Adana Film Festival | Best Supporting Actress | Nasipse Adayız | Won | |
| 2020 | 53rd Turkish Film Critics Association Awards | Best Supporting Actress | Nasipse Adayız | Won | |
| 2020 | Turkey Youth Awards | Best Supporting Actress | Bir Zamanlar Çukurova | Won | |
