= Mahkum =

- Also known as: Prisoner
- Genre: Action; Drama
- Based on: Innocent Defendant by Han Jung-hwan
- Developed by: MF Yapım
- Screenplay by: Uğraş Güneş
- Directed by: Volkan Kocatürk
- Starring: Onur Tuna; İsmail Hacıoğlu; Seray Kaya; Melike İpek Yalova; Hayal Köseoğlu
- Composers: Sertaç Özgümüş; Çağlar Haznedaroğlu; Alper Ketenci
- Country of origin: Turkey
- Original language: Turkish
- No. of seasons: 2
- No. of episodes: 31

Production
- Producer: Asena Bülbüloğlu
- Running time: 130 minutes

Original release
- Network: Fox
- Release: 14 December 2021 – 29 October 2022

Mahkum is an adaptation of Innocent Defendant, a South Korean series signed by MF Yapım, and is a Turkish television series in the action and drama genre, the first episode of which was released on December 14, 2021.

== Production ==
The most watched TV series on the screens in a short time, Mahkum, was adapted from the 2017 South Korean TV series Innocent Defendant.

== Cast ==
=== Main cast ===
Actor, Actress	Role	Episodes
Onur Tuna	Fırat Bulut	1–31
İsmail Hacıoğlu	Barış Yesari	1–31
Melike İpek Yalova	Büge Yesari	1–31
Hayal Köseoğlu	Sasha Doğan	1–31

|Seray Kaya |Cemre Uysal |1–17 |– |}

=== Supporting cast ===
Actor	Role	Episodes
Gökçe Eyüboğlu	Giryan Tekin	25-31
Nazlı Bulum	Eylül	25-30
Erdal Küçükkömürcü	Muhsin Dadaloğlu	25-30
Seda Türkmen	Ayşе	25-31
Mehmet Ulay	Zahit Yesari	1–24
Hakan Salınmış	Beybaba	1–24
Hakan Karsak	Hacı Alagöz	1–31
Tugay Mercan	Paşa Yıldız	1–24
Müharrem Türkseven	Kamber Şen	1–24
Furkan Kalabalık	Bekir	1–31
Burcu Cavrar	Ceyda	1–31
Murat Şahan	Mücahit	1–24
Alya Sude Mazak	Nazlı Bulut	1–31
İlker Yağiz Uysal	Zahit Can Yesari	1–31
Emre Özcan	Rafi	7–31
Talat Bulut	Sinyor/Efkan Dağlı	14–23
Neslihan Arslan	Derya	18–24

=== Departed characters ===
Actor	Role	Episodes
İsmail Hacıoğlu	Savaş Yesari	1–2
Gökhan Tercanlı	Zafer	1–5
Ece İrtem	Ferda Doğu	3–6
Alara Bozbey	Zeynep Bulut	1–7
Rami Mullamusa	Ali Kartaş	4–11
Gürberk Polat	Eren	1–12
Bülent Düzgünoğlu	Erol Çevik	1–13
Emrullah Kartal	Seko	1–14
Fatih Dokgöz	Sadullah Anzerli	15
Bülent Seyran	Yurdaer	1–16
Seray Kaya	Cemre Uysal	1–17
Gülçin Hatıhan	Nazan Şen	2–18
Melih Çardak	Yâdigar Altın	11–19
Nihal Koldaş	Tomris Yesari	1–20
Anıl İlter	Tahir Terzi	2–20

== See also ==
- Television in Turkey
- List of Turkish television series
- Turkish television drama
