= Onur Tuna =

Turkish actor (born 1985)

- Born: 2 July 1985 (age 41); Çanakkale, Turkey
- Education: Dokuz Eylül University; Ege University
- Occupations: Actor, singer, model
- Years active: 2011–present
- Television: Yasak Elma, Filinta
- Height: 1.96 m (6 ft 5 in)

Onur Tuna (born 2 July 1985) is a Turkish actor and singer. He is known for his roles in series Filinta, Mahkum, Yasak Elma, Mucize Doktor and film A Small September Affair.

== Early life ==
Tuna was born in Çanakkale. After Ottoman Empire collapsed, His maternal family is of Turkish descent who immigrated from Thessaloniki. (today in Greece). His mother is retired from the land office, his father is a teacher of mathematics.

He completed his undergraduate education at Dokuz Eylül University Faculty of Economics. He also studied Turkish classical music at Ege University Conservatory. Onur Tuna who knows how to play the guitar also has two songs called Acın Verdi and Tıpkı Sen. Onur Tuna has played licensed volleyball and basketball since the middle school years. He started to take part in theater plays in middle school and high school years. While studying at University in İzmir, he worked as a professional model for four years. He studied acting at Izmir Müjdat Gezen Art Center. When Onur Tuna settled down in Istanbul, he took private lessons for acting. Those acting pieces of training were containing method and front-camera acting skills. For this purpose, he worked with Ümit Çırak, Ayla Algan, Craft Theatre and Saim Güveloğlu.

== Acting career ==
=== TV series ===
His acting career started with Hayat Devam Ediyor (Life Goes On) Turkish TV series in 2011. Other TV series he joined in are Huzur Sokağı (Street of Peace).

He had a leading role in the period detective series Filinta. Tuna continued his career with the crime series Cesur Yürek. He was not cast in third season of Yasak Elma.

In 2019, he started playing Ferman in Mucize Doktor, an adaptation of South Korean TV series Good Doctor. As of 2021, he shared the lead roles with İsmail Hacıoğlu in the Fox Türkiye series Mahkum, an adaptation of Innocent Defendant.

=== Films ===
Onur Tuna also acted in two movies in Turkey. In 2014, he played as an actor in A Small September Affair Turkish drama film. He also was a leading actor in the movie Ağır Romantik (Heavy Romance or Severely Romantic). Tuna also played in a short film by Yadel Uzun titled Kir.

=== Web series ===
With his Mucize Doktor's co-star Hazal Türesan, he starred in the crime series Sarmaşık Zamanı.

== Filmography ==
=== Web series ===
Year	Title	Role	Notes
2023–	Sarmaşık Zamanı	Kerem	Leading role

=== TV series ===
Year	Title	Role	Notes
2011–2012	Hayat Devam Ediyor	Siraç Bakırcı	Supporting role
2013	Huzur Sokağı	Ali Taner Atahan	Joined
2014–2016	Filinta	Filinta Mustafa	Leading role
2016–2017	Cesur Yürek	Ömer Korkmaz	Leading role
2018–2019	Yasak Elma	Alihan Taşdemir	Leading role
2019–2021	Mucize Doktor	Ferman Eryiğit	Leading role
2021–2022	Mahkum	Fırat Bulut	Leading role
2023–2024	Şahane Hayatım	Mesut Öztürkmen	Leading role
Upcoming 2026	KaraKuyu	Kahraman Maranoğlu	Leading Role

=== Movies ===
Year	Title	Role	Notes
2014	A Small September Affair	Atıl	Actor
2020	Ağır Romantik	Kerem Babayiğit	Leading role
2022	Benden Ne Olur?	Soner Güler	Leading role
2023	Son Akşam Yemeği	Mustafa Kemal Atatürk	Leading role

== Discography ==
=== EPs ===
Title and Details
Tracking List
Uzay Misali
- Released: 2018

No.	Title	Length
1.	"Uzay Misali"	2:57
2.	"Ben Özlerim"	3:55
3.	"Korkmadım"	3:37
4.	"Etrafı Kalabalık"	4:09

Dalgın
- Released: 2020

No.	Title	Length
1.	"Dalgın"	3:11
2.	"Susar"	3:08
3.	"Kendine Dön"	2:55
4.	"Zaman"	4:00

=== Singles ===
Song	Year
"Yangın Yeri"	2019
"Bi' Hiçmişim Gibi"	2022
