= Sumru Yavrucuk =

Turkish actress (born 1961)

- Born: 24 September 1961 (age 64); Ankara, Turkey
- Occupation: Actress
- Years active: 1982–present
- Partner: Ilhan Sesen (1999-2022)
- Children: 1

Sumru Yavrucuk (born 24 September 1961) is a Turkish theatre, TV and movie actress best known for her many theatre plays. Outside of Turkey, she is known for playing Songül Yenilmez in Room Number: 309, Feride in The Foreign Groom, and Meryem Aksoy in What is Fatmagül's crime? She has also starred in several movies, most notably Are We OK?

== Education and career ==
Sumru Yavrucuk was born on the 24th of September 1961 in Ankara. She studied at the Department of Singing and Theatre of the Istanbul Municipal Conservatory before transferring to the Ankara State Conservatory. After finishing her studies, Yavrucuk moved to Istanbul where she started working as an actress at the Istanbul State Theatre in 1982. Over the years she acted in many plays including classics such as Lysistrata, A Midsummer Night's Dream, The Beauty Queen of Leenane, Epic of Gilgamesh, Macbeth and many others. Her latest play is Shirley; adapted to Turkish from Willy Russell's play Shirley Valentine.

Yavrucuk started acting in television shows in 1988. She starred in several Turkish shows, most notably Yabancı Damat which proved to be a hit in other countries as well like Greece, Serbia, Bulgaria and North Macedonia. Her most recent television show is Baraj which started airing in 2020. She also played a main role on the hit TV show Room Number: 309.

Yavrucuk started acting in movies during the 90s and since then has starred in Annem (2019), Bizi Hatırla (2018), Are We OK? (2013), Luks Glück (2010), Seni seviyorum Rosa (1992) and others.

== Personal life ==
Sumru Yavrucuk lives in Istanbul with her son Yağmur. In 2003, she married Erdinç Ünlü but they divorced in 2005.

== Filmography ==
=== TV shows ===
| Title | Year | Role | Notes |
|---|---|---|---|
| Şahane Hayatım | 2023– | Aysel Gümüşçü | |
| Evlilik Hakkında Her Şey | 2021–2022 | Çolpan Cevher | |
| Baraj | 2020–2021 | Zerrin | |
| Room Number: 309 | 2016-2017 | Songül Yenilmez | |
| Acil Aşk Aranıyor | 2015 | Nisan's mother | |
| Ağır Roman Yeni Dünya | 2012 | Tina | |
| Fatmagül'ün Suçu Ne? | 2010-2012 | Meryem Aksoy | |
| Bahar Dalları | 2009 | Güzide | |
| Sevgili Dünürüm | 2007 | Yıldız | |
| Yabancı Damat | 2004-2007 | Feride | |
| Mars Kapıdan Baktırır | 2004 | Yıldız | |
| Bizim Otel | 2001 | Eva | |
| Parça Pinçik | 2000 | | |
| Dostlar Pasajı | 1997 | | |
| Tutkular | 1995 | | |
| Ayaşlı ve Kiracıları | 1989 | İffet | |
| Önce Canan | 1988 | | |

=== Films ===
| Title | Year | Role | Notes |
|---|---|---|---|
| Annem | 2019 | Ayşe | Main role |
| Bizi Hatırla | 2018 | Leman | |
| Tamam mıyız? | 2013 | Temmuz's mother | |
| Patroniçe | 2004 | | TV movie |
| Halk Düşmanı | 2004 | | TV movie |
| Sır | 1997 | | |
| Yer Çekimli Aşklar | 1995 | | |
| İş | 1994 | | |
| Seni Seviyorum Rosa | 1992 | Rosa | |
| Çıplak | 1992 | Ayla | |
| Yorum Yok | 1990 | | |
