= Furkan Palalı =

Turkish actor and model (born 1986)

- Born: 27 October 1986 (age 39); Konya, Turkey
- Occupations: Actor, model
- Years active: 2009–present
- Height: 1.93 m (6 ft 4 in)
- Website: furkanpalali.com

Furkan Palalı (born 27 October 1986) is a Turkish actor and model who was chosen as the Best Model of Turkey in 2011. Since 2010, he has worked in both the national and international fashion industry and has pursued a career in acting, starting by joining Tuncay Özinel Theatre in 2010.

== Early life and education ==
He completed his middle school education at Konya Private Diltaş High School. After graduating from Konya Dolapoğlu Anatolian High School, Palalı completed his university education in the Department of Geological Engineering of Ankara Hacettepe University. Palalı, who received 6 months of creative drama training in Ankara and theater acting training from Tuncay Özinel and Ferdi Merter, continued his studies towards a master's degree in Marmara University Radio and Television Department.

== Career ==
=== Basketball career ===
Palalı played for the Konyaspor basketball team, then part of Turkey's main basketball league, for seven years. In 2000, he joined the Konya branch of Tofaş sports club. After playing in the team for two years, he gave up his basketball career to focus on his studies.

=== Modeling ===
During his university studies, Palalı started his modeling career at an Ankara-based agency, where he enrolled during his school term through the support of his friends and a relative working in a modelling agency in Ankara. After graduating from the university, he signed a contract with Selin Boronkay Agency in 2010. Having participated in various events for 1.5 years through this agency and after posing in many fashion shows and catalogs, Palalı participated in the 2011 Best Model of Turkey contest and finished first.

=== Acting ===
He made his television debut in 2010 with his role as Aras in Küçük Sırlar adaptation of "Gossip Girl". He then appeared as a guest on Adını Feriha Koydum.

Meanwhile, he started a career on stage and was cast in plays such as Uyan Uyan Gazi Kemal and Tetikçi. He appeared at last six times in a leading role at Tepebaşı Theatre as a part of the play Tetikçi, written and directed by Ferdi Merter.

He then had a brief role in ATV's Hayat Devam Ediyor series in February 2012. Palalı starred in the period series Son Yaz between 2012 and 2013, alongside Hazal Kaya, Tuğçe Kazaz and Tardu Flordun.

He was then cast alongside Ekin Türkmen and Müge Boz in Show TV series Aşk Emek İster in 2013.

Palalı portrayed the National Intelligence Organization officer Murad Altay in Osman Sınav's Kızılelma series, which was broadcast on TRT 1. The series premiered in January 2014 and concluded with 28 episodes in October 2014.

He then had a leading role in TRT 1 crime series Son Çıkış. In 2016, he made his cinematic debut with a leading role in the movie Somuncu Baba Aşkın Sırrı. In June 2016, he began to appear in a main role on the TV series No 309, which was broadcast on FOX.

== Filmography ==
Film
Year	Title	Role	Notes
2016	Somuncu Baba Aşkın Sırrı	Somuncu Baba. Sheyh hamid-i-Vali	Leading role
2017	Direniş Karatay	Mevlana Celaleddin Rumi	Leading role
2019	Yuvaya Dönüş	Mesut	Leading role
Web Series
Title	Year	Role	Note
2023	Şebeke		Leading role
TV series
Year	Title	Role	Notes
2010	Küçük Sırlar	Aras	Joined
2010	Adını Feriha Koydum	Model	Guest
2012	Hayat Devam Ediyor	Giray	Joined
2012	Son Yaz Balkanlar	Arif	Leading role
2013	Aşk Emek İster	Demir	Leading role
2014	Kızılelma	Murad Altay	Leading role
2015	Son Çıkış	Kenan	Leading role
2016-2017	No: 309	Onur Sarıhan	Leading role
2018	Bir Mucize Olsun	Yiğit Tümer	Leading role
2019	Benim Tatlı Yalanım	Nejat Yılmaz	Leading role
2020-2022	Bir Zamanlar Çukurova	Fikret Fekeli	Leading role

== Awards ==
- 2020: Buzz Magazine Actors Awards. The Golden Men. The Best Actor in Turkish Drama.
- 2019: 46Th Golden Butterfly Awards. Best Actor in a Romantic Comedy Series by My sweet lie / Benim Tatli Yalamin. (Nominee).
- 2019: Turkey & Azerbaijan Fellowship Awards. Best Actor Romantic Comedy.
- 2019: Turkey Brand Awards. Leading Brand Award Best Romantic Comedy Actor of the year. My sweet lie / Benim Tatli Yalamin.
