= Vurgun (web series) =

- Also known as: Profiteer
- Genre: Drama
- Written by: Gökdeniz Babadağ (26-35); Khazar Refizade (15-26)
- Story by: Berk Sezen
- Directed by: Berk Sezen (1-35)
- Opening theme: Tension Heats Up
- Country of origin: Turkey
- Original language: Turkish
- No. of seasons: 3
- No. of episodes: 35

Production
- Producer: Berk Sezen
- Editor: Berk Sezen
- Running time: 25-30 minutes

Original release
- Release: January 22, 2018 – May 4, 2021

Vurgun (English title: Profiteer) is a Turkish internet series produced by Buballs Pictures. The first season premiered on January 22, 2018. It was directed, produced and edited by Berk Sezen. The Art Director was Mine Çetkin. It was written by Gökdeniz Babadağ, Khazar Refizade and Berk Sezen. The series has 3 seasons and ended on May 4, 2021.

== Plot ==
Nur is a 'de facto mother' who left her children behind herself twenty years ago. She tosses herself from a lie to another lie to take care of the family she left behind herself. Money opens every door ever whatsoever: While Nur is a person who looks younger than her own university-attending daughter, the lies won't find their ends forever. Every mistake that was done and forgotten in the past will perhaps change the direction of the misery. The beginning of some stories are uncertain.

== Characters ==
Character	Appearances			EP	First Seen	EP	Last Seen
Character	Season 1	Season 2	Season 3	EP	First Seen	EP	Last Seen
Main characters
Nur Atay / İnan	Main	Main	Main	1.1	Vurgun	3.12	Vurgun'da Final (Finale in Vurgun)
Aslı Elveren	Main	Main	Main	1.1	Vurgun	3.12	Vurgun'da Final (Finale in Vurgun)
Erkan Atay	Main	Main	Main	1.1	Vurgun	3.12	Vurgun'da Final (Finale in Vurgun)
Peri Elveren	Main	Main	Main	1.1	Vurgun	3.10	Göz Yumma (Don't Ignore)
Zerrin Atay		Main	Main	2.1	Tehlikeli Hissedar (Dangerous Shareholder)	3.12	Vurgun'da Final (Finale in Vurgun)
Önder Atay	Main	Main	Main	1.10	Ben Yaşıyorum	3.11	Son Çare (The Last Remedy)
Batı Elveren	Main	Main	Main	1.1	Vurgun	3.12	Vurgun'da Final (Finale in Vurgun)
Beste Atay	Main	Main	Main	1.14	Vurgun Sezon Finali (Vurgun Season Finale)	3.12	Vurgun'da Final (Finale in Vurgun)
Muzaffer Elveren	Main	Main		1.1	Vurgun	2.5	Bir Yakına Veda (Farewell to a Relative)
Recurring characters
Neslişah Atay / Sahar	Recurring	Recurring	Recurring	1.1	Vurgun	3.8	Şah-Mat (Checkmate)
Selçuk Atay	Recurring	Recurring	Recurring	1.1	Vurgun	3.12	Vurgun'da Final (Finale in Vurgun)
Necip Atay	Recurring	Recurring	Recurring	1.1	Vurgun	3.8	Şah-Mat (Checkmate)
Süreyya Atay	Recurring	Recurring	Recurring	1.1	Vurgun	3.8	Şah-Mat (Checkmate)
Havva Atik	Recurring	Recurring	Recurring	1.1	Vurgun	3.10	Göz Yumma (Don't Ignore)
Didem Atik	Recurring	Recurring	Recurring	1.1	Vurgun	3.10	Göz Yumma (Don't Ignore)
Ezgi Özkan		Recurring	Recurring	2.4	Geciken İntikam (The Delayed Revenge)	3.11	Son Çare (The Last Remedy)
Duygu Yılmaz		Recurring	Recurring	2.4	Geciken İntikam (The Delayed Revenge)	3.11	Son Çare (The Last Remedy)
Kamile Uyaran / Taşürek	Recurring	Recurring	Recurring	1.3	Yeni Umutlar (New Hopes)	3.12	Vurgun'da Final (Finale in Vurgun)
Rahmi Taşürek	Recurring	Recurring	Recurring	1.9	Çanta Dolusu Nefret (A Bag Full of Hatred)	3.12	Vurgun'da Final (Finale in Vurgun)
İhsan Acar		Recurring	Recurring	2.4	Geciken İntikam (The Delayed Revenge)	3.7	Yeni Bir Devir (A New Era)
İlkay Aydın		Guest	Guest	2.6	İntikam Hırsı (The Ambition of Vengence)	3.4	Ya Öyle Ya Böyle (Either This or That)
Lerzan Aksel			Guest	3.2	Yeni Gelen Eskiyi Aratır (Newcomers Are Worse Than the Old Ones)	3.7	Yeni Bir Devir (A New Era)
Nermin Kaplan		Recurring	Recurring	2.1	Tehlikeli Hissedar (Dangerous Shareholder)	3.7	Yeni Bir Devir (A New Era)
Şükran Uzun		Recurring	Recurring	2.1	Tehlikeli Hissedar (Dangerous Shareholder)	3.7	Yeni Bir Devir (A New Era)
Cavidan Küfeci		Recurring	Recurring	2.7	Geçmişin Hesabı (Facing Off With the Past)	3.6	Toz Duman İçinde (Encircled with Dust)
Ergin Atik	Recurring			1.1	Vurgun	1.14	Vurgun Sezon Finali (Vurgun Season Finale)
Miraç Gökhan Çetin			Recurring	3.5	Cesaretin Varsa (If You Have the Courage)	3.12	Vurgun'da Final (Finale in Vurgun)
Berrin Birsu Çetin			Recurring	3.3	Konakta Davet (Party at the Mansion)	3.12	Vurgun'da Final (Finale in Vurgun)
Hanım Aydemir			Recurring	3.7	Yeni Bir Devir (A New Era)	3.12	Vurgun'da Final (Finale in Vurgun)
Aydın Sert			Recurring	3.6	Toz Duman İçinde (Encircled with Dust)	3.12	Vurgun'da Final (Finale in Vurgun)
İkramiye Taşürek / Tarınç	Recurring	Recurring	Recurring	1.11	Kaçırıldım (I'm kidnapped)	3.12	Vurgun'da Final (Finale in Vurgun)
Kevser Taşürek	Recurring	Recurring	Recurring	1.11	Kaçırıldım (I'm kidnapped)	3.12	Vurgun'da Final (Finale in Vurgun)
Müştak Taşürek	Recurring	Recurring	Guest	1.11	Kaçırıldım (I'm kidnapped)	3.5	Cesaretin Varsa (If You Have the Courage)
Berzan Taşürek			Guest	3.4	Ya Öyle Ya Böyle (Either This or That)	3.5	Cesaretin Varsa (If You Have the Courage)
Mücahit Tarınç	Recurring	Recurring		1.11	Kaçırıldım (I'm kidnapped)	2.3	Geciken İntikam (The Late Revenge)
Durmuş Tarınç	Recurring	Recurring		1.11	Kaçırıldım (I'm kidnapped)	2.1	Tehlikeli Hissedar (The Dangerous Shareholder)

== Broadcast schedule ==
Season no.	Airing day and time	Season premiere	Season finale	No. of episodes	Episode range	Year	Network
Season 1	Monday 20.00	22 January 2018	21 August 2018	14	1-14	2018	YouTube
Season 2	Monday/Friday 18.30/19.30/20.00	30 October 2018	16 July 2019	9	15-23	2018–2019	YouTube
Season 3	Tuesday 20.00	24 November 2020	4 May 2021	12	24-35	2020–2021	YouTube
