= Uğur Güneş (actor) =

Turkish actor (born 1987)

- Born: 10 November 1987 (age 38); Ankara, Turkey
- Education: Ankara University Theatre Department
- Occupation: Actor
- Years active: 2011–present
- Known for: Diriliş: Ertuğrul; İsimsizler; Bir Zamanlar Çukurova; Selahaddin: Kudüs'ün Fatihi

Uğur Güneş (born 10 November 1987) is a Turkish actor. He rose to fame by playing the character Tugtekin Bey in Diriliş: Ertuğrul—for which he was awarded Actor of the Year by the Ankara Ministry of Youth. Güneş received great praise for his performance in the television series İsimsizler ("the nameless"), for which he was given the Jury Special Award at the Young Turkey Summit Academy Awards 2017. He received the Best Series Trio award for his role in Bir Zamanlar Çukurova ("once upon a time, in Çukurova") at the 24th Golden Lens Award Ceremony 2019. In 2023, he took on the lead role of the historical leader Saladin Ayyubid in Selahaddin: Kudüs'ün Fatihi ("Saladin: Conqueror of Jerusalem"); the multi-part dramatic series tells the life story of Saladin and his contemporaries and enemies, as well as the Crusades, in the 12th century.

== Career ==
Güneş made his debut on TV with the Turkish drama series Yeniden Başla (Start Again), which aired on TRT in 2011. Next, he appeared in ATV TV series Benim İçin Üzülme (Don't Worry for Me). The show continued for two seasons. Güneş made his first appearance in cinema with Tamam miyiz? (Are We OK?) in 2013 & later appeared in the Turkish horror movie Şeytan-ı Racim (Devil) in the same year.

He became popular with his role as Tugtekin Bey in the popular Turkish historical drama Diriliş: Ertuğrul (Resurrection: Ertuğrul) and received the Best Actor Award by the Ministry of Youth and Sports in 2016. In 2014 he played the character of Çetin in the TV series Urfalıyam Ezelden (Devoted). He also worked in a mini historical series Seddülbahir 32 Saat in 2016 alongside Murat Ünalmış, İbrahim Çelikkol. He played the character of Fatih in the action TV series İsimsizler (Nameless Squad) alongside Hande Soral. He starred in Bir Zamanlar Çukurova TV series in 2018 and won critics' praises. He also played Cemal Tunalı, a patriotic character in the movie Cep Herkülü: Naim Süleymanoğlu, based on the life of Naim Süleymanoğlu. Most recently, he is starring as the main character Selahuddin in Kudus Fatihi Selahuddin Ayyubi.

== Personal life ==
Uğur Güneş spent his childhood in Ankara. He has one brother and one sister. He started acting at Ankara Art Theatre by the suggestion of a friend. After graduating from Ankara University Language, History and Theatre School, Güneş took acting as a profession.

== Filmography.... ==
Web series
Year	Title	Role
2016	Seddülbahir 32 Saat	Hüseyin
TV series
Year	Title	Role
2011	Yeniden Başla	Eray
2012–2013	Benim İçin Üzülme	Şiyar
2014	Urfalıyam Ezelden	Çetin
2015	Diriliş: Ertuğrul	Tuğtekin Bey
2017	İsimsizler	Fatih
2018–2021	Bir Zamanlar Çukurova	Yılmaz Akkaya
2021–2022	Kanunsuz Topraklar	Davut
2023	Al Sancak	Ali Banazlı
2023-2025	Kudüs Fatihi Selahaddin Eyyubi	Selahaddin Eyyubi
2025-2026	Rüya Gibi	Emir
Film
Year	Title	Role
2013	Şeytan-ı Racim	Emrah
2013	Tamam mıyız?	Serhat
2019	Cep Herkülü: Naim Süleymanoğlu	Cemal Tunalı
2023	Serçenin Gözyaşı	Gazi
2023	Gün Batımına Birkaç Gün Kala	
2025	Ask ve Yemek	Cihan

== Awards and nominations ==
Awards
Year	Awards Ceremony	Category	Project	Result
2016	Ankara Ministry of Youth Awards	Best Actor of the Year	Diriliş: Ertuğrul	Won
2017	Young Turkey Summit Academy Awards	Jury Special Award	İsimsizler	Won
2019	Golden Lens Award Ceremony	Best Series Trio Award	Bir Zamanlar Çukurova	Won
2022	Murex D'or International (Dubai)	Best international Turkish actor	all Characters	Won
2023	Boğaziçi Film Festival	Best Male Turkish actor	Gün Batımına Birkaç Gün Kala	Won
