= Vahide Perçin =

Turkish actress and television personality (born 1965)

- Born: 13 June 1965 (age 61); İzmir, Turkey
- Education: Dokuz Eylül University
- Occupation: Actress
- Years active: 1992–present
- Spouse: Altan Gördüm (m. 1991; div. 2013)
- Children: 1

Vahide Perçin (born 13 June 1965) is a Turkish actress and acting trainer. She was credited for a number of years by her married name Vahide Gördüm, but after divorcing, she went back to her maiden name.

== Early life ==
Perçin was born on 13 June 1965 in Karşıyaka, İzmir, the daughter of Turkish immigrants from Greece. Her father was a truck driver and her mother a housewife. She studied graphic in high school and then entered the Faculty of Economics but finally started acting. She later attended Dokuz Eylül University's Faculty of Fine Arts and passed all the nine exams of its Theatre School. She finished her studies as the best student and received great support from her teacher Özdemir Nutku. After leaving the university she moved to Ankara. Later she received an offer from the State Theatre and then moved to Adana.

== Career ==
In 2003, Perçin started her television career by portraying Suzan Kozan in the TV series Bir İstanbul Masalı. The Gördüm family later moved to Istanbul and shortly after Perçin portrayed the character Fulya in the TV series Hırsız Polis. In 2006, she starred in the film İlk Aşk alongside Çetin Tekindor. She won the 2007 Golden Boll award for best actress for her performance in the film İlk Aşk. From 2007 to 2010, she acted in the series Annem and played the leading role Zeynep Eğilmez. In 2010, she was cast in cinema movie Zephyr. The film was selected for the 47th Antalya "Golden Orange" International Film Festival and the 35th Toronto International Film Festival, where it premiered. Perçin later appeared in the TV series Adını Feriha Koydum and portrayed one of the leading roles alongside Hazal Kaya. She later left the series after the second season's conclusion for health reasons.

In 2012, Perçin starred in the series Merhaba Hayat which is based on the original American series Private Practice. She shared the leading role with Yetkin Dikinciler, Seda Güven, Nihan Büyükağaç, Yasemin Sanino, Melike Güner and Keremcem. On 13 January 2013, the series concluded after 13 episodes. Perçin joined the cast of the TV series Muhteşem Yüzyıl as Hürrem Sultan in June 2013 after Meryem Uzerli left the series for health reasons.

== Personal life ==
In 1991, Perçin married the actor Altan Gördüm and started to be credited by his surname. Their only child Alize, who is also an actress, was born in 1994. They divorced in 2013. In 2011, Perçin was diagnosed with breast cancer and received medical treatment shortly after.

== Filmography ==
Film
Year	Title	Role	Notes
2005	Anlat İstanbul	Hürrem	Leading role
2006	İlk Aşk	Nevin	Leading role
2007	İyi Seneler Londra	Ferda	Supporting role
2008	Devrim Arabaları	Suna	Supporting role
2011	Zefir	Ay	Leading role
2012	Ayhan Hanım	Ayhan	Leading role
2019	Kapı	Şemsa	Leading role
Television
Year	Title	Role	Notes
2003–2005	Bir İstanbul Masalı	Suzan Kozan	Supporting role
2005–2007	Hırsız Polis	Fulya	Supporting role
2007–2009	Annem	Zeynep Eğilmez	Leading role
2011–2012	Adını Feriha Koydum	Zehra Yılmaz	Leading role
2012–2013	Merhaba Hayat	Deniz Korel	Leading role
2013–2014	Muhteşem Yüzyıl	Hürrem Sultan	Leading role
2016	Göç Zamanı	Cennet	Leading role
2016–2017	Anne	Gönül Aslan	Leading role
2018–2020	Bir Zamanlar Çukurova	Hünkar Yaman	Leading role
2022–2024	Aldatmak	Güzide Yenersoy	Leading role
2024–2025	Şakir Paşa Ailesi: Mucizeler ve Skandallar	İsmet	Leading role
Theatre
Year	Title	Written by	Venue
1992	Yer Demir Gök Bakır	Yaşar Kemal	Ankara Art Theater
1993	403 Kilometre	İsmet Küntay	Ankara Art Theater
1994	Pazar Keyfi	G. Mitchelle	Ankara Art Theater
1996	Şeytan Örümceği	Erdogan Aytekin	İzmir State Theater
1997	Play the Game	Michael Frayn	İzmir State Theater
1998	Peace	Aristophanes	İzmir State Theater
1999	Köse Dağın Köprüsü	Erol Aksoy	İzmir State Theater
2000	Ayrılık	Behiç Ak	Ankara Art Theater
2001	Kızılırmak Karakoyun	Tuncer Cücenoğlu	Adana State Theater
2001	The Crucible	Arthur Miller	Adana State Theater
2002	Extraordinary Night	Jerome Chodorov	Adana State Theater
2007	Little Martial Crimes	Éric-Emmanuel Schmitt	Play Workshop

== Awards ==
Year	Award	Category	Work
1996	Art Institute	Best Actress	
2007	14th International Adana Film Festival	Best Actress	İlk Aşk
2007	Magazine Journalists Association: Gold Lens Awards	Best Theatre Actress	Evlilikte Ufak Tefek Cinayetler
2008	Radio and Television Society Journalists of the Year Awards	Actress of the Year	Annem
