= İbrahim Çelikkol =

Turkish actor

- Born: İzmit, Turkey
- Occupations: Actor, model
- Years active: 2007–present
- Spouse(s): Mihre Mutlu (m. 2017; div. 2022) Natali Yarcan (m. 2025)
- Children: 1

İbrahim Çelikkol is a Turkish TV series and film actor, and a former fashion model and player of the Turkey national under-20 basketball team.

== Life and career ==
His maternal family is of Turkish origin who immigrated from Thessaloniki, Ottoman Empire (now, Greece). His paternal family is of Arab descent.

His father was a football player. When he died, İbrahim Çelikkol left basketball. His family is generally sportsmen and musicians. He has a sister named Aslı Çelikkol.

Çelikkol worked as a professional model before he started acting. When he met Osman Sınav, a Turkish film producer, he started acting. His first part was Şamil in Pars: Narkoterör. He played Ulubatlı Hasan in Fetih 1453, for which he won a Ekrem Bora Promising Actor Award.

On 7 April 2026, Çelikkol was among nine celebrities detained in Istanbul as part of an investigation into alleged offences involving banned substances.

== Filmography ==
=== Film ===
Year	Title	Role	Notes
2012	Fetih 1453	Ulubatlı Hasan	Main role
2014	Sadece Sen	Ali	Main role
2024	Intoxicated by Love	Eskandar	Main role

=== Web series ===
Year	Title	Role	Notes
2016	Seddülbahir 32 Saat	Mehmet Çavuş	Main role
2022	Kuş Uçuşu	Kenan Sezgin	Main role
2026	Ayrılık da Sevdaya Dahil	Kemal Yanıklar	Main role
TBD	Binbir Gece Masalları		Main role

=== Television ===
Year	Title	Role	Notes
2004	Camdan Pabuçlar	Mert	Main role
2008	Pars: Narkoterör	Şamil Baturay	Main role
2009	M.A.T.	Sinan Atalay	
2010	Keskin Bıçak	Mithat	Main role
2010–2011	Karadağlar	Gülali Karadağ	Main role
2011–2012	İffet	Cemil Özdemir	Main role
2013–2014	Merhamet	Fırat Kazan	Main role
2014	Reaksiyon	Oğuz	Main role
2016	Kördüğüm	Ali Nejat Karasu	Main role
2017–2018	Siyah Beyaz Aşk	Ferhat Aslan	Main role
2018–2019	Muhteşem İkili	Mert Barca	Main role
2019–2021	Doğduğun Ev Kaderindir	Mehdi Karaca	Main role
2021–2022	Bir Zamanlar Çukurova	Hakan Gümüşoğlu	Main role
2024	Gaddar	Korkut Zakkum	Guest star
2026	Doktor: Başka Hayatta	Inan Kural	Main role
