= Elçin Sangu =

Turkish actress and model (born 1985)

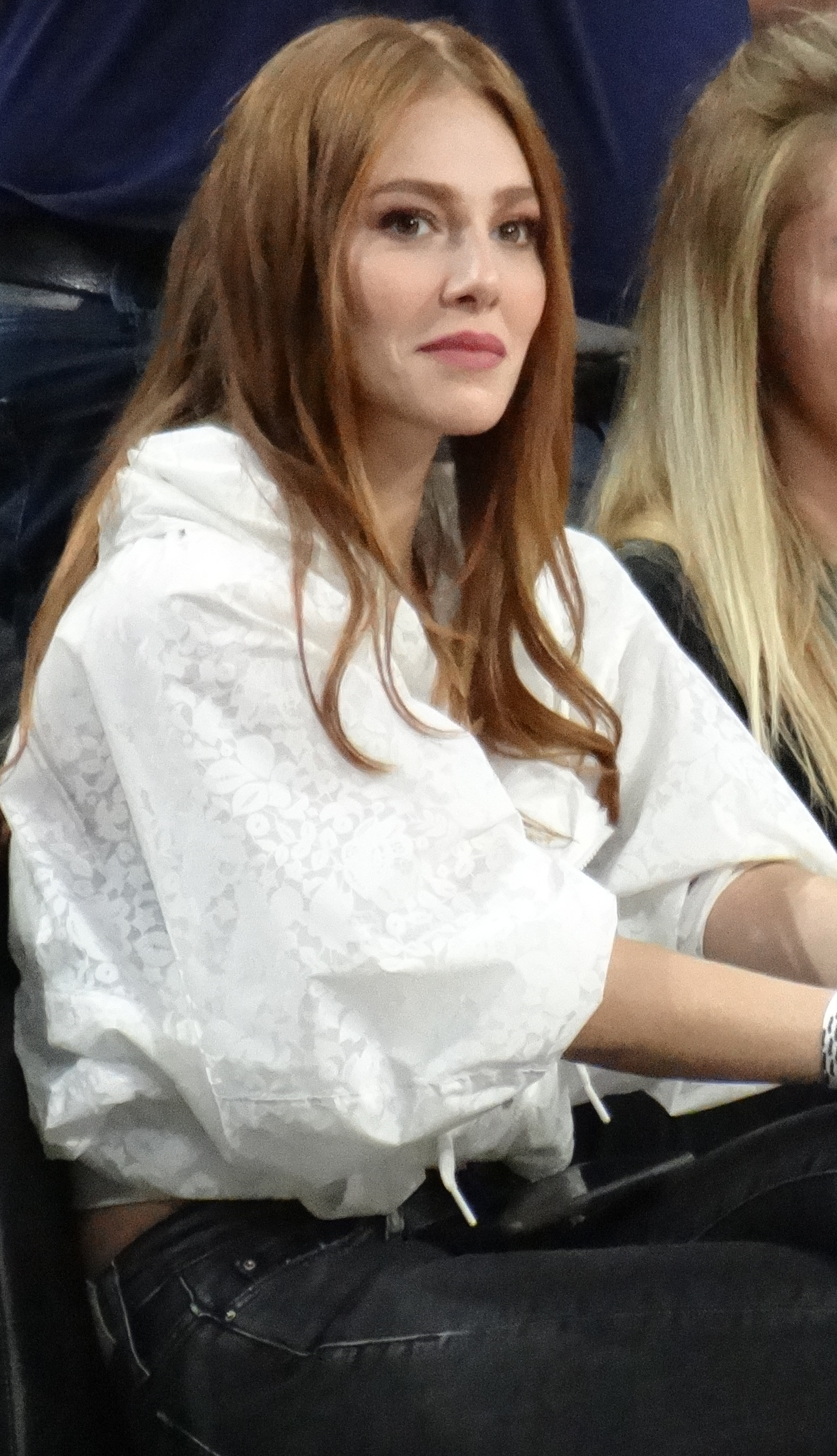
- Sangu in 2017
- Born: 13 August 1985 (age 41); İzmir, Turkey
- Education: Mersin University
- Occupations: Actress, model
- Years active: 2011–present
- Notable work: Kiralık Aşk, Kurt Seyit ve Şura, Öyle Bir Geçer Zaman ki, Çarpışma

Elçin Sangu (born 13 August 1985) is a Turkish actress and model. With her appearance in television ads and campaigns, she has become one of the highest-paid celebrities in Turkey.

Sangu is best known for her leading role Defne in the Star TV romantic comedy series Kiralık Aşk (2015–2017). For this work, she has been nominated and has received multiple awards in Turkey, including three Golden Butterfly Awards. Sangu also appeared in the television series Öyle Bir Geçer Zaman ki (2011), Aşk Kaç Beden Giyer (2012–2013), Bir Aşk Hikâyesi (2013–2014), Kurt Seyit ve Şura (2014), and Sevdam Alabora (2015).

== Life and career ==
Elçin Sangu was born on 13 August 1985, as the only child of an ethnic Circassian family from İzmir in Western coast of Turkey. She graduated from Opera Department at Mersin University and took acting lessons at the Sahne Tozu Theatre.

In 2011, she was cast as Jale in Kanal D drama series Öyle Bir Geçer Zaman ki, where she also sang and played piano. Between 2012 and 2013, she played the lead role of Nehir in Aşk Kaç Beden Giyer. From 2013 to 2014, she starred as Eda Çağlar in Bir Aşk Hikâyesi, an adaptation of the South Korean television series I'm Sorry, I Love You. In 2014, she portrayed Güzide in historical drama series Kurt Seyit ve Şura filmed in Russia, Turkey, and Ukraine. Following another leading role in 2015 aTV series Sevdam Alabora, she started acting in Kiralık Aşk along with Barış Arduç the same year. In 2016, she became the face of Sunsilk care products, and Boyner.

The popular romantic comedy series Kiralık Aşk aired on Star TV until its finale in January 2017. Her performance in the series received critical acclaim. In the second season of the series, she came across Seçkin Özdemir, the lead actor in one of her earlier projects, Bir Aşk Hikayesi. In 2017, it was reported that Sangu would appear in a news series on Kanal D. In August of the same year, Sangu together Barış Arduç were cast in the movie Mutluluk Zamanı (previously titled Yanımda Kal and Gitme Sen!).

== Personal life ==
Sangu is in a relationship since 2011 with Yunus Özdiken, who holds a job at a private firm outside the world of arts and entertainment.

Sangu was chosen as the second most popular actress in Turkey in 2016, based on a number of different surveys.

As of September 2016, she is the tenth most followed Turkish celebrity on Instagram.

== Filmography ==
=== Film ===
Year	Title	Role	Director	Notes
2012	Hiç	Gonca	Selim Demirdelen	
2017	Mutluluk Zamanı	Ada	Şenol Sönmez	
2020	9 Kere Leyla	Nergis	Ezel Akay	
2025	Uykucu	Saye	Can Ulkay	

=== Web series ===
Year	Title	Role	Platform	Notes
2018	Yaşamayanlar	Mia	BluTV	Leading role
2024	Prens	İray	BluTV	Guest star
2025	Elçin Sangu ile 101	Herself	Gain	Host
2026	Not a Stranger	Funda İnal	Netflix	Leading Role

=== TV series ===
Year	Title	Role	Notes
2011	Öyle Bir Geçer Zaman ki	Jale	Supporting role
2012	Sen de Gitme	Burcu	Guest appearance
2012–2013	Aşk Kaç Beden Giyer	Nehir	Leading role
2013–2014	Bir Aşk Hikâyesi	Eda Çağlar	Supporting role
2014	Kurt Seyit ve Şura	Güzide	Supporting role
2015	Sevdam Alabora	Zeynep	Leading role
2015–2017	Kiralık Aşk	Defne Topal	Leading role
2018–2019	Çarpışma	Zeynep Tunç	Leading role
2020	İyi Günde Kötü Günde	Leyla Ertekin	Leading role
2021	Yalancılar ve Mumları	Ceyda Yıldırım	Leading role
2022–2023	Çöp Adam	Peri Sonad	Leading role
2026	Cevher	Cevher	Leading role

=== Music videos ===
Year	Artist	Title
2014	Toygar Işıklı	"Söz Olur"
2017	Elçin Sangu & Barış Arduç	"Bu Su Hiç Durmaz"

== Theatre ==
Year	Play	Role	Venue	Notes
2022	Şehirde Kimse Yokken	Rukiye	Zorlu PSM	From playwright Ahmet Sami Özbudak, directed by Lerzan Pamir
2022	Jekyll & Hyde	Lucy Harris	Zorlu PSM	Adaptation of an original Broadway production, written and composed by Frank Wildhorn and Leslie Bricusse.
