= Mehmet Ali Nuroğlu =

Turkish actor (born 1979)

- Born: 7 September 1979 (age 46); Istanbul, Turkey
- Occupation: Actor
- Years active: 1997–present
- Spouses: Çiçek Nuroğlu (m. 2011; div. 2022) Berrin Ağırbaş (m. 2023)

Mehmet Ali Nuroğlu (born 7 September 1979) is a Turkish actor.

== Life and career ==
Born in Istanbul, his family is originally from Şanlıurfa. After studying philosophy for three years at Middle East Technical University, Nuroğlu enrolled in Hacettepe University to study theatre. While still studying, he started working for the Turkish State Theatres. Meanwhile, he worked as an assistant for actor Semih Sergen. In order to get a role in Çağan Irmak's period drama series Çemberimde Gül Oya, he moved to Istanbul and portrayed the character of Mehmet. He later starred in the movie Zincirbozan, portraying the character of an Idealist called Reis. He then joined the cast of Kırık Kanatlar, a TV series on Turkish War of Independence.

== Filmography ==
=== Television ===
Year	Title	Role
2003	Yuvadan Bir Kuş Uçtu	
2004	Çemberimde Gül Oya	Mehmet
2005	Kırık Kanatlar	Teğmen Nevzat
2008	Vurgun	Tayfun
2009	Ayrılık	Spartak
2009	Ömre Bedel	Erdem
2012	Uçurum	Adem
2013	Tatar Ramazan	
2014	Güzel Köylü	Kaan Yontar
2016	Çanakkale Yüzyıllık Mühür	Vardvan
2018	Sen Anlat Karadeniz	Vedat Sayar
2019–2020	Güvercin	Kenan
2023–2025	Kudüs Fatihi Selahaddin Eyyubi	Nur ad-Din Zengi
2025-present	Kurulus Orhan	Timur Tash

=== Film ===
Year	Title	Role
2005	Cenneti Beklerken	Şehzade Yakup
2006	Umut Adası	Çetin
2007	Peri Tozu	Cem
2007	Zincirbozan	Mehmet
2008	Başka Semtin Çocukları	Semih
2008	Nokta	Ahmet
2009	Sonsuz	Remzi
2011	Bizim Büyük Çaresizliğimiz	Bora
2013	Kusursuzlar	Ferit
2013	Kış Uykusu	Timur
2016	Rüya	Yaren

=== Internet ===
Year	Title	Role
2022-2023	Çekiç ve Gül: Bir Behzat Ç. Hikayesi	Yücel Demirdelen
2023-2024	Mevlânâ Celâleddîn-i Rûmî	Şems-i Tebrizi

== Awards ==
Year	Award	Category
2022	Kristal Ağaç Ödülü (ODTÜ)	Honorary Award
