= Leyla Everlasting =

2020 Turkish comedy film

- Turkish: 9 Kere Leyla
- Directed by: Ezel Akay
- Written by: Adnan Yıldırım; Özlem Lale; Uğur Saatçi; Ezel Akay
- Produced by: Figen Ermek Özçorlu; Umut Özçorlu; Necati Akpınar
- Starring: Demet Akbağ; Haluk Bilginer; Elçin Sangu; Fırat Tanış; Alican Yücesoy
- Cinematography: Hayk Kirakosyan
- Edited by: Ömer Özyılmazel
- Music by: Ender Akay; Cem Ergunoğlu; Ömer Taşkın; Tanju Eren
- Production companies: Contact Film Works; BKM Film
- Distributed by: Netflix
- Release date: 4 December 2020
- Country: Turkey
- Language: Turkish

Leyla Everlasting (Turkish: 9 Kere Leyla, lit. '9 Times Leyla') is a 2020 Turkish comedy film directed by Ezel Akay and written by Akay, Adnan Yıldırım, Özlem Lale and Uğur Saatçi, starring Demet Akbağ, Haluk Bilginer, Elçin Sangu, Fırat Tanış and Alican Yücesoy. Originally to be theatrically released by BKM Film on March 20 2020, the film's distribution rights were sold to Netflix due to the COVID-19 pandemic. It was released on 4 December 2020 on Netflix.

== Cast ==
- Demet Akbağ - Leyla
- Haluk Bilginer - Adem
- Elçin Sangu - Nergis
- Fırat Tanış - Mahdum
- Alican Yücesoy - Haris
- Hakan Eke - Hızır
- Emre Kıvılcım - Harun-Faruk
- İhsan Ceylan - İlyas
- Hasan Eflatun Akay -
- Bertan Çelikkol -
- Kerime Obenik -
- Bimen Zartar - Dayı
- Reşit Berker Enhoş -
- Arda Cartı -
