= Öykü Gürman =

Turkish singer and actress (born 1982)

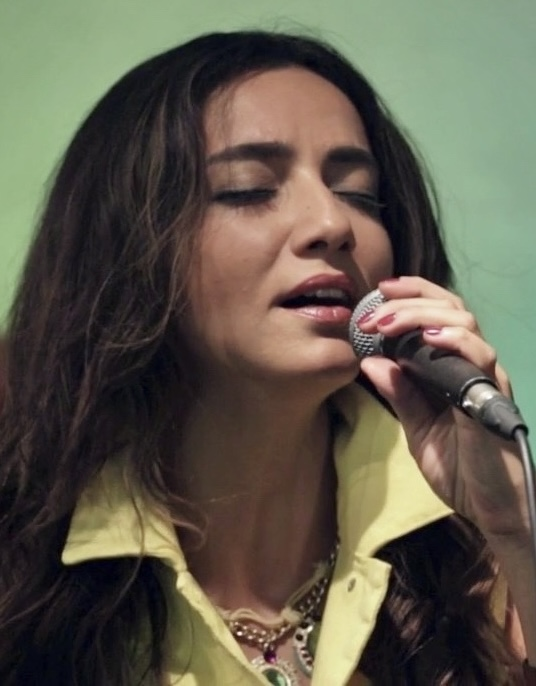
- Gürman in 2014

Background information
- Born: 4 August 1982 (age 44); Istanbul, Turkey
- Occupations: Singer, actress
- Spouses: Yavuz Bingöl (m. 2015; div. 2016) Fatih İçmeli (m. 2023)
- Musical career
- Genres: Pop, flamenco, Turkish folk
- Years active: 2007–present
- Label: Pasaj
- Formerly of: Öykü ve Berk (2007–2010)

Öykü Gürman (born 4 August 1982) is a Turkish singer and actress. In 2007, she and her twin brother formed the duo Öykü ve Berk and released three albums until 2015. Ever since, she has pursued a solo music career and has worked as an actress.

== Education and career ==
Gürman studied at Private Efdal Kindergarten and Primary School and later at İstek Foundation Acıbadem High School. She graduated from Pera Fine Arts High School in 2001. In 2001, she continued her music education by taking violin and singing lessons at the Istanbul Technical University Turkish Music State Conservatory.

Gürman makes music by blending Mediterranean and Arabic musical elements. She and her brother rose to prominence by sharing a video of themselves on YouTube, in which they performed the song "Evlerinin Önü Boyalı Direk".

Their first album, Kısmet, has a total of 10 songs. In addition to the songs bearing Berk's signature, they blended famous türküs with flamenco elements and put them in the album. After these releases, they presented the music and chat program Boyalı Direk on TRT 1. In 2010, Öykü and Berk ended the duo, and decided to pursue a solo career.

Since 2014, she has shifted her focus to her acting career. She is best known for her role as Asiye in the drama series Sen Anlat Karadeniz, in which she starred between 2018 and 2019.

== Discography ==
=== Albums ===
==== As Öykü ve Berk ====
- Kısmet (2007) / Pasaj Müzik
- İki Arada (2009) / Pasaj Müzik

==== Solo ====
- Bir Başka (2011) / Pasaj Müzik
- Rüya Bitti (2015) / Pasaj Müzik

=== Singles ===
- "Nem Alacak Felek Benim" (2014)
- "Düşün Beni" (2018)
- "Ay Işığı" (with Koliva) (2019)
- "Deniz Gözlüm" (2020)
- "Yine Sevenler Sevsin" (2020)
- "Nació la Luna" (with Berk Gürman) (2021)
- "Unutuldum Mu Yani" (with Berk Gürman) (2021)
- "Ayaz Geceler" (2022)
- "Acıyı Bırak" (2023)
- "Ey Halimi Soranım" (2024)
- "Bi Sana" (with Burak King) (2024)
- "Ah Be Hayat" (2024)
- "Bu Dağlar Kömürdendir" (2024)
- "Kara Sevda" (Temel Sümela'nın Şifresi Yeniden soundtrack) (2025)
- "Gidin Bulutlar Gidin" (2025)
- "Doyulur Mu" (with İsmail Altunsaray) (2025)
- "Kahveyi Kavururlar" (2025)
- "Bugün Bayram Günü" (2025)

== Filmography ==
Year	Title	Role
2004	Türkü Filmi	Guest appearance
2014	Panzehir	Zeynep
2014	Urfalıyım Ezelden	Ceylan
2015	Aşk Zamanı	Leyla Korkmaz
2018–2019	Sen Anlat Karadeniz	Asiye Kaleli
2020	Gel Dese Aşk	Sitare
2021	Bayram Şekeri	Pınar
2022–2023	Alparslan: Büyük Selçuklu	Öke Hatun
2022	Bandırma Füze Kulübü	Nurgül
2023–	Sen Türkülerini Söyle	judge
2024	Grabuna	İpek
2024–2025	Gönül Dağı	Kiraz Arslan
2025	Temel: Sümela'nın Şifresi Yeniden	Fadime
2026	Gassal	Güzel
2026	Altı Üstü İstanbul	Fahriye Toprak
