= Kurt Seyit ve Şura =

- Genre: Period drama; Romance; Psychological thriller; Murder mystery
- Created by: Nermin Bezmen
- Developed by: Nermin Bezmen
- Written by: Nermin Bezmen; Melek Gençoğlu; Ece Yörenç
- Directed by: Hilal Saral; Nermin Bezmen
- Starring: Kıvanç Tatlıtuğ; Farah Zeynep Abdullah; Fahriye Evcen; Ushan Çakır; Birkan Sokullu; Elçin Sangu; Orhan Deniz; Melisa Damla Öykü
- Composer: Toygar Işıklı
- Country of origin: Turkey
- Original language: Turkish
- No. of seasons: 2
- No. of episodes: 21

Production
- Producer: Kerem Çatay
- Production location: Turkey
- Running time: 90 minutes
- Production company: Ay Yapım

Original release
- Network: Star TV
- Release: 4 March – 20 November 2014

Kurt Seyit ve Şura is Turkish television drama based on the novel of the same name created by Nermin Bezmen. (It is not a direct adaptation of Kurt Seyt ve Murka, which is the second novel in the series, nor of Shura, which is the third novel, all of which are from Bezmen.) It was broadcast on Star TV from 4 March to 20 November 2014 for two seasons and 22 episodes. Nermin Bezmen, the writer of the novel is the granddaughter of Kurt Seyit. The show "Kurt Seyit ve Sura" is based on a true story where a handsome army major falls in love with a Russian girl. This show re-aired on E extra in 2022.

In 2011, "Bir Günah Gibi" series which not a direct adaptation of second novel Kurt Seyt ve Murka, was broadcast on ATV. The series stars Burak Hakkı, Hande Soral, Özge Borak, Serkan Altunorak. It received generally mixed to negative reviews from critics, and was eventually cancelled due to low ratings.

== Plot ==
"Kurt Seyit ve Şura" is about the adventures of two people in love who are forced to leave their lives and family behind and escape to Istanbul during the Russian Revolution. The journey of Kurt Seyit Eminof (Kıvanç Tatlıtuğ), a handsome lieutenant from Crimea, and Şura (Farah Zeynep Abdullah), the beautiful daughter of a noble Russian family, tells their tale from the days of magnificence in Petrograd, to the Carpathian front line, from the riots to the revolution, from bucolic Alushta to occupied Istanbul, to Pera in the 1920s. It is the journey of their love.

== Cast ==
Actress/Actor	Character	Description	Season 1	Season 2
Kıvanç Tatlıtuğ	Kurt Seyit "The Wolf" Eminof	A young, handsome Turkish man from the southern coast of Crimea who is 1st Lieutenant of the elite Imperial Guard. Oldest of three sons to Mirza (Mehmet) and Zahide Eminof.	Main	Main
Farah Zeynep Abdullah	Alexandra Julianovna "Şura” Verjenskaya	A young, beautiful Russian woman of noble birth from Kislovodsk in Southern Russia; youngest daughter to Julien Verjensky.	Main	Main
Ushan Çakır	Celil Kamilof	One of four of Seyit's closest friends, also fiancé to Tatiana (Tatya). Grew up as a young boy from Alushta and is like an adopted member of the Eminof family. In the second season, he has fallen in love with Güzide.	Main	Main
Birkan Sokullu	Petro Borinsky	The main antagonist; one of four of Seyit's closest friends from boyhood, with psychopathic and murderous tendencies. He has always hated Seyit with a passion, something that worsened once he became obsessed with Sura, whom he nearly rapes. He is driven completely insane throughout the course of the series, but is eventually exposed for his tyranny and killed by Seyit.	Main antagonist	Main antagonist
Eva Dedova	Tatiana "Tatya” Tchoupilkina	Renowned prima ballerina and fiancée to Celil. She dies while fleeing Alushta as it becomes overrun with Bolsheviks.	Main	
Aslı Orcan	Barones Lola	A former lover of Seyit's who turns to double-dealing in order to escape Russia. She works alongside and against Lieutenant Billy and Petro as well as the Turkish side.	Main	
Elçin Sangu	Güzide	A young woman living with her sister-in-law and sister-in-law's mother on land near the Eminof's estate in Alushta, who falls in love with Celil. She marries Ahmet Yahya before the second season despite loving Celil.	Supporting	Main
Cem Bender	Lieutenant Billy	A British soldier in occupied Istanbul who develops a deep hatred of Seyit and everyone who is closely connected to him.		Main
=== Verjenskaya Family ===
Atay Gergin	Julien Verjensky	Proud father of daughters (from oldest to youngest) Valentina (Tina), Nina, and Alexandra (Şura). At the beginning of the series he has traveled to Petrograd (modern-day St. Petersburg) with his daughters, Tina and Şura, to have an unknown illness diagnosed and treated.	Supporting	
Seda Güven	Valentina "Tina” Verjenskaya	The oldest of Şura's two sisters, engaged to Konstantin. In Season Two, she is a widow and supports Şura alongside Petro in attempts to get her away from Seyit.	Supporting	Main
Tuğçe Karabacak	Nina Verjenskaya	The middle sister of the Verjenskayas.	Supporting	
=== Eminof Family ===
Şefika Tolun	Zahide Eminofa	Devoted Wife to Mirza (Mehmet) Eiminof and mother to Seyit, Mahmut, & Osman.	Supporting	
Serdar Gökhan	Mirza Mehmet Eminof	Husband of Zahide, father to Seyit, Mahmut, and Osman. Wealthy landowner and a former Colonel of the Tsar's Imperial Guard, he runs his estate and family with strict principles and a strong sense of honor.	Supporting	
Oral Özer	Mahmut Eminof	Seyit's younger brother, the middle son, married to Havva and with a young son named after his grandfather.	Supporting	
Barış Alpaykut	Osman Eminof	Seyit's youngest brother who is extremely devoted to his family.	Supporting	
Sümeyra Koç	Havva Eminofa	Wife of Mahmut, Seyit's younger brother, and mother to Mahmut's and her young son. At the beginning of the series, she is expecting their second child.	Supporting	
=== Friends of Seyit & Şura ===
Doğu Alpan	Vlademir	One of four of Seyit's closest friends.	Supporting	
Tolga Savacı	Ahmet Yahya	Owner of a hotel in Istanbul who, along with his extended family, befriends Seyit & Şura.		Supporting
Osman Alkaş	Ali	Extended family of Ahmet Yahya who helps out at the Cheref hotel.		Supporting
Sacide Taşaner	Binnaz	Extended family of Ahmet Yahya who helps out at the Cheref hotel, specifically in the kitchen. She arranges Güzide's and Yahya's marriage.		Supporting
Melisa Aslı Pamuk	Ayşe	Extended family of Ahmet Yahya who helps out at the Cheref hotel, specifically in the kitchen. She is a widow who eventually remarries to Mürvet's brother. She is in love with Seyit despite him not reciprocating it and causes problems for Seyit and Şura as well as the rest of the house.		Supporting
Fahriye Evcen	Mürvet “Murka"	A young Turkish woman who is reunited with her mother at the beginning of the season who eventually becomes Kurt Seyit Eminof's wife.		Main
Demet Özdemir	Alina "Alya” Sokolova	A former young Russian woman of noble birth now working as a laundress in Istanbul after fleeing the revolution in Russia.		Main
Zerrin Nişancı	Maria Borinsky	Petro's mother.		Supporting
Selçuk Sazak	Andrei Borinsky	Petro's father, a wealthy businessman.		Supporting
Zerrin Tekindor	Nermin Bezmen and Emine	Author being interviewed and performing intermittent voice-overs.		Supporting

== Episodes ==
Series	Episodes	Originally released	
Series	Episodes	First released	Last released
1	13	4 March 2014	10 June 2014
2	8	23 September 2014	20 November 2014
