= İş Bank commercial featuring Atatürk =

Turkish bank commercial

- Haluk Bilginer as Atatürk
- Directed by: Gürkan Kurtkaya
- Starring: Haluk Bilginer; Hakan Büyüktopçu
- Release date: 10 November 2007
- Running time: 107 seconds
- Country: Turkey
- Language: Turkish

The İş Bank commercial featuring Mustafa Kemal Atatürk, the founder of Turkey, first aired on Turkish television channels on 10 November 2007, coinciding with the 69th commemoration of Atatürk's death in 1938. This is reportedly the first commercial featuring Atatürk.

== Plot ==
The commercial features a dialogue between a young boy and Atatürk working in a rose garden. A thorn pricks Atatürk's finger. The boy asks how a thorn can prick Atatürk's hand. Atatürk replies with the question: "can it not prick?" The boy further asks how Atatürk's hand can bleed. Atatürk replies with the question: "can it not bleed?" Shocked, the boy inquires whether he isn't Atatürk? Atatürk replies that he is indeed Atatürk. The boy, still shocked, replies "but...". Atatürk interrupts and explains that if one is going to grow a rose, one will suffer pain, one's hand will bleed, sun will make one sweat, there will be people putting to the gardener that the roses in the garden will never die, and that there will be people confronting the gardener on how a rose is supposed to be grown. Atatürk continues by saying that the boy should be asking him just one question: "Do I want to make this place a rose garden? Do I want to grow the world's most beautiful roses in this garden?" Atatürk further adds that if the boy really wishes it to be so, "he wouldn't care about neither the thorns that prick nor the words said". Atatürk continues by saying that whoever it might be, all he would care about is the scent of the rose garden. Atatürk concludes by asking, whether the boy understood the lesson and the boy acknowledges this. The commercial concludes with the statement "We respectfully commemorate Mustafa Kemal Atatürk, the founder of our country and bank".

== Production ==
The original sequence that is behind the inspiration at the rose garden

The commercial was directed by Gürkan Kurtkaya and was shot in black and white giving it a historic feel with the slogan "the roses you have grown are mourning" (Turkish: Yetiştirdiğin güller bugün matemdeler). The preparations for the commercial lasted three weeks. The actual filming itself lasted 3 days. A technical team made out of 50 people took part in the filming. For the details of the era, Rıdvan Akar was consulted.

The role of the boy was acted by Hakan Büyüktopçu and the role of Atatürk was acted by Haluk Bilginer. Prior to the shooting, Haluk Bilginer received a natural make-up lasting hours. Including the test shootings, Bilginer spent a total of 40 hours in the make-up room. The make-up work was conducted by Vittorio Sodano and his team. For one week, the make-up team worked in Italy for preparations and worked for another week in the set during the shootings. To convert Bilginer's face to Atatürk, first a cast was made of his face. Hair and eyebrow pieces that were prepared in Italy were put in their places by Suzan Kardeş after a 2-day worth work on them. The costumes were based on a photo from June 21, 1936 of Atatürk. Designer Nalan Türkoğlu and her team of six people created ten costumes in one week.

To find a suitable location for the take representing the features of the era, three separate teams searched Istanbul, Edirne, Bursa, İzmir, and Antalya. Finally Paşabahçe was the location agreement concluded with. A special set was made for the filming, and the take of the 107-second commercial started in the morning and lasted till later that night. After each take, Bilginer went behind camera and had inspected each plan.

== Reception ==
The resemblance of Haluk Bilginer to Atatürk featured heavily in the comments by reviewers. Acting in the role of Atatürk for the first time, Bilginer himself stated that he was honored by the role and that he was very excited about getting to play it.

The commercial also established a candidate for the debated role of Atatürk in the upcoming movie on Atatürk. Kevin Costner, who was in Turkey for a concert, declined this post, reportedly asking whether there wasn't a Turkish actor for the role. The commercial portraying Turkey as a rose garden also demonstrates the difficulties Atatürk coped with in founding the republic and his reforms.
