= Seçkin Özdemir =

Turkish actor, TV presenter, radio personalità and disc jockey (born 1981)

- Born: 25 August 1981 (age 45); Istanbul, Turkey
- Education: Kocaeli University
- Occupations: Radio personality, television presenter, actor and disc jockey

Seçkin Özdemir (born 25 August 1981) is a Turkish actor and former TV presenter, radio personality, and disc jockey (DJ).

== Early life ==
Seçkin Özdemir was born and raised in Istanbul. His mother, who was born in Greece and immigrated to Turkey, is of Turkish descent, from Xanthi, Greece (Turkish minority live in Xanthi). His father is from Sinop. He studied at Kocaeli University and received a degree in economics from there.

== Career ==
Seçkin Özdemir worked in other professions before and while acting until 2017, when he officially went into acting. He began his career as a radio presenter at "Red Fm", but his passion for music eventually led him to become a DJ, taking him to major cities across Turkey to perform. He has acted in many commercials as well.

Seçkin Özdemir had roles in several television series. His first acting role was as Burak in Yaban Gülü at around age 27. His rise to fame in the acting world was with his role in Muhteşem Yüzyıl, followed by his starring roles in Al Yazmalım (2011-2012) and Bir Aşk Hikayesi (2013-2014).

In 2014, Seçkin Özdemir starred in Günahkar with Gülcan Arslan, Hazal Filiz Küçükköse, and Korel Cezayirli. However, the series ended due to low ratings after its seventh episode. In 2015, he starred in Racon: Ailem İçin with Mehmet Aslantuğ, Hande Doğandemir, and Barış Arduç, but it concluded with its fourth episode because of poor rankings. The same year, he starred in Acı Aşk alongside Sezgi Sena Akay. He rose higher with his role in Kiralık Aşk in 2016, where he once again met Elçin Sangu and Barış Arduç, his co-stars from earlier series. He was nominated for the 44th and 45th Golden Butterfly Awards for his starring role in Ateşböceği and made it to the finals both times. He starred in many more series, including Can Kırıkları, where he played the role of Chief Commissioner Aslan Erçetin and once again came across Hande Doğandemir. One of his later popular roles was in 2020 when he played the role of Flatyos in Kuruluş: Osman. In 2021, he played in Baş Belası as Chief Commissioner Şahin Kara alongside İrem Helvacıoğlu. He went on to play in the critically acclaimed series Mehmed: Fetihler Sultanı, which won multiple awards, including "Series of the Year" at the 10th Anatolian Media Awards. In the series, Seçkin Özdemir portrayed Constantine XI, the last Byzantine Emperor, serving as the initial and main antagonist. The following year, Özdemir appeared in the summer series Asırlık Gece as a fictional military officer serving as the commander of the Guard Regiment. The show, which focuses on the 2016 July 15 military coup attempt, was released on the same day 10 years later in 2026. Two days after it concluded, the first episode of Evlilik Güzeldir, a series with him as one of the starring actors, was released on September 07.

Seçkin Özdemir also starred in three movies. The first was Bir Nefes Yeter in 2017, where he starred with Tuvana Türkay. In 2018, he played the role of Commissioner Gökhan in Bücür. In 2024's Yaren Leylek, which is said to be based on a true story, he had a leading role alongside Hande Doğandemir once more, along with Bugra Gülsoy.

Seçkin Özdemir also appeared in the Turkish cooking show Arda Ile Omuz Omuza's 212th episode in 2025.

== Personal life ==
In 2018, Seçkin Özdemir and actress Demet Özdemir, who introduced their families and planned to get engaged in 2019, announced that they had been in a relationship for 4 months, and rumours of them living in the same house arose. However, the couple broke up three months later and deleted all their photos together. While fans have many theories about their sudden breakup, the exact reason remains unknown.

== Filmography ==
=== Television ===
Year	Title	Character	Role	Episodes
2008	Yaban Gülü	Burak	Supporting	1-15
2011	Muhteşem Yüzyıl	Leopold "Leo"	Supporting	1 & 14-25
2011–2012	Al Yazmalım	İlyas Avcı	Main	1-37
2013–2014	Bir Aşk Hikayesi	Korkut Ali	Main	1-36
2014	Günahkar	Ali Yusuf Tan	Main	1-7
2015	Racon: Ailem İçin	Adnan Korhan	Main	1-4
2015–2016	Acı Aşk	Bulut Ocak	Main	1-13
2016–2017	Kiralık Aşk	Pamir Marden	Main	53-65
2017	Ateşböceği	Barış Buka	Main	1-17
2018	Tehlikeli Karım	Alper Boztepe	Main	1-6
2018	Can Kırıkları	Aslan Erçetin	Main	1-4
2019	Sevgili Geçmiş	Sinan Malik	Main	1-8
2020	Hizmetçiler	Yiğit Atahanlı	Main	1-3
2020–2021	Kuruluş: Osman	Flatyos	Supporting	28-48
2021	Baş Belası	Şahin Kara	Main	1-13
2024–2025	Mehmed: Fetihler Sultanı	Constantine XI Palaiologos	Main	1-42
2026	Asırlık Gece	Tolga Kılınçarslan	Main	1-15
2026	Evlilik Güzeldir	Murat Akın	Main	1-

=== Film ===
Year	Title	Character	Role
2017	Bir Nefes Yeter	Yaman Ergin	Main
2018	Bücür	Gökhan	Main
2024	Yaren Leylek	Kartal	Main

=== Theater ===
Year	Title	Role	Notes
2021	Taxim		Baba Sahne

== Awards and nominations ==
Year	Award	Category	Work	Result
2017	Golden Butterfly Awards	Best Comedy & Romantic Comedy Series Male Actor	Ateşböceği	Nominated
2018	Golden Butterfly Awards	Best Romantic Comedy Series Male Actor	Ateşböceği	Nominated
