= Deniz Sağdıç =

Turkish artist

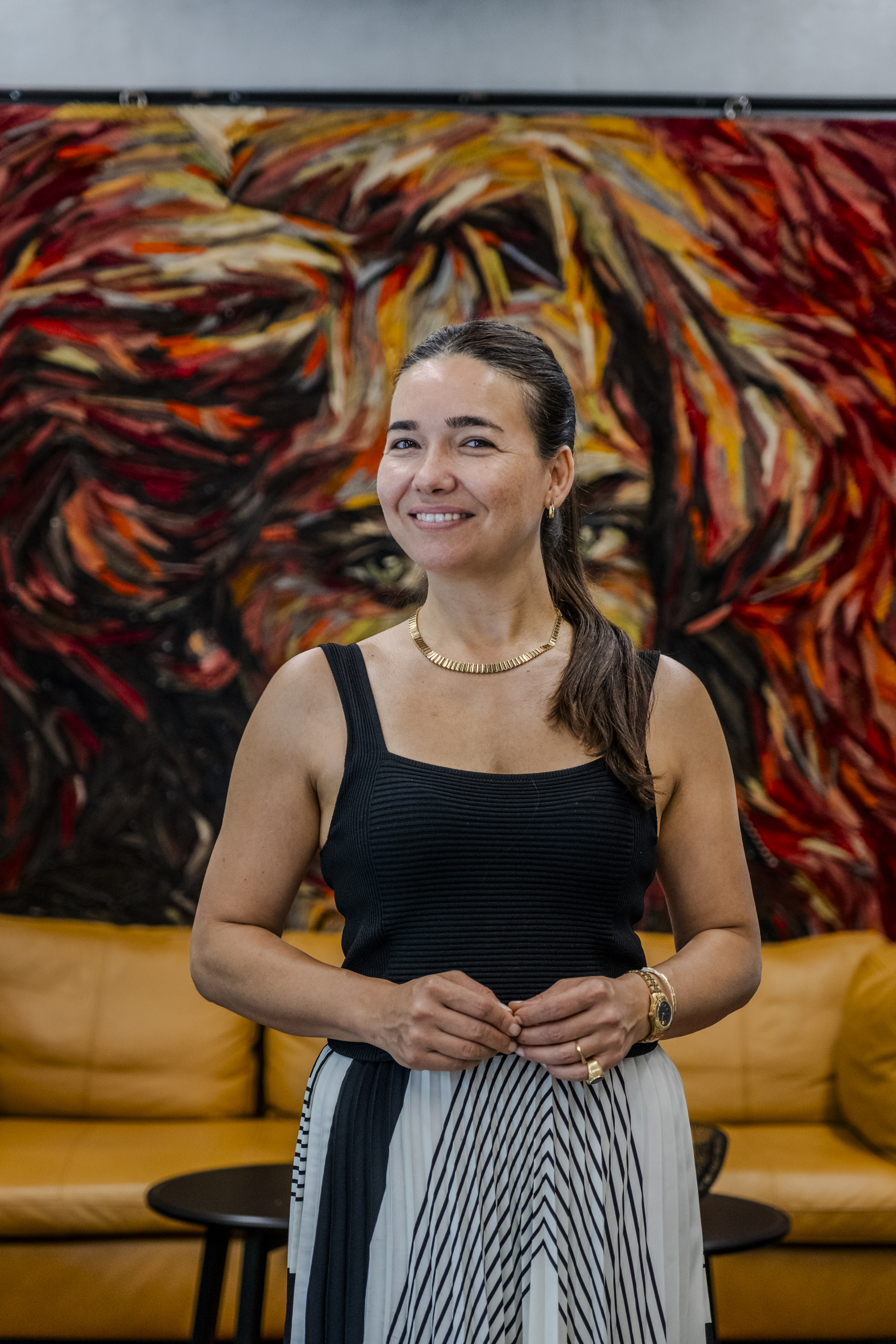
- Born: 1982 (age 43–44); Mersin, Turkey
- Website: www.denizsagdic.tr

Deniz Sağdıç (born 1982) is a Turkish artist. She began her art education at Mersin University's Faculty of Fine Arts in 1999. She was included in various projects even as a student. She graduated with a first from the same university in 2003. The young artist who has featured in many international and national projects.

== Life and career ==
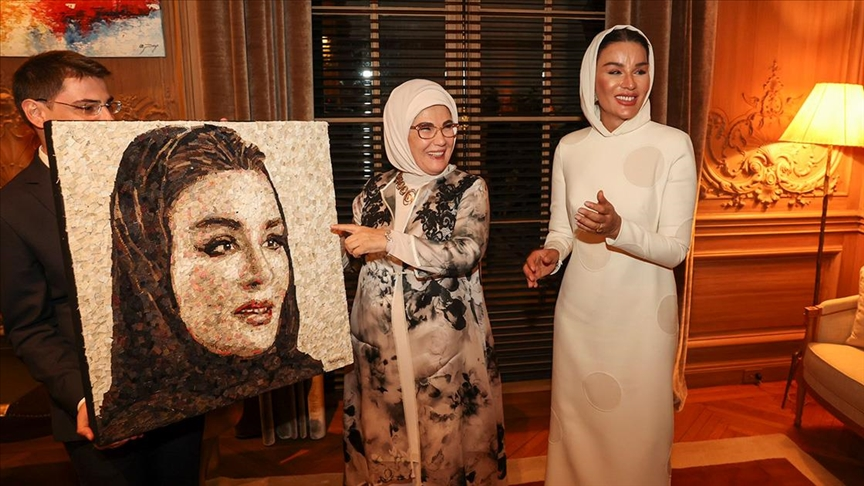
Emine Erdoğan presenting a painting by artist Deniz Sağdıç to Sheikha Moza

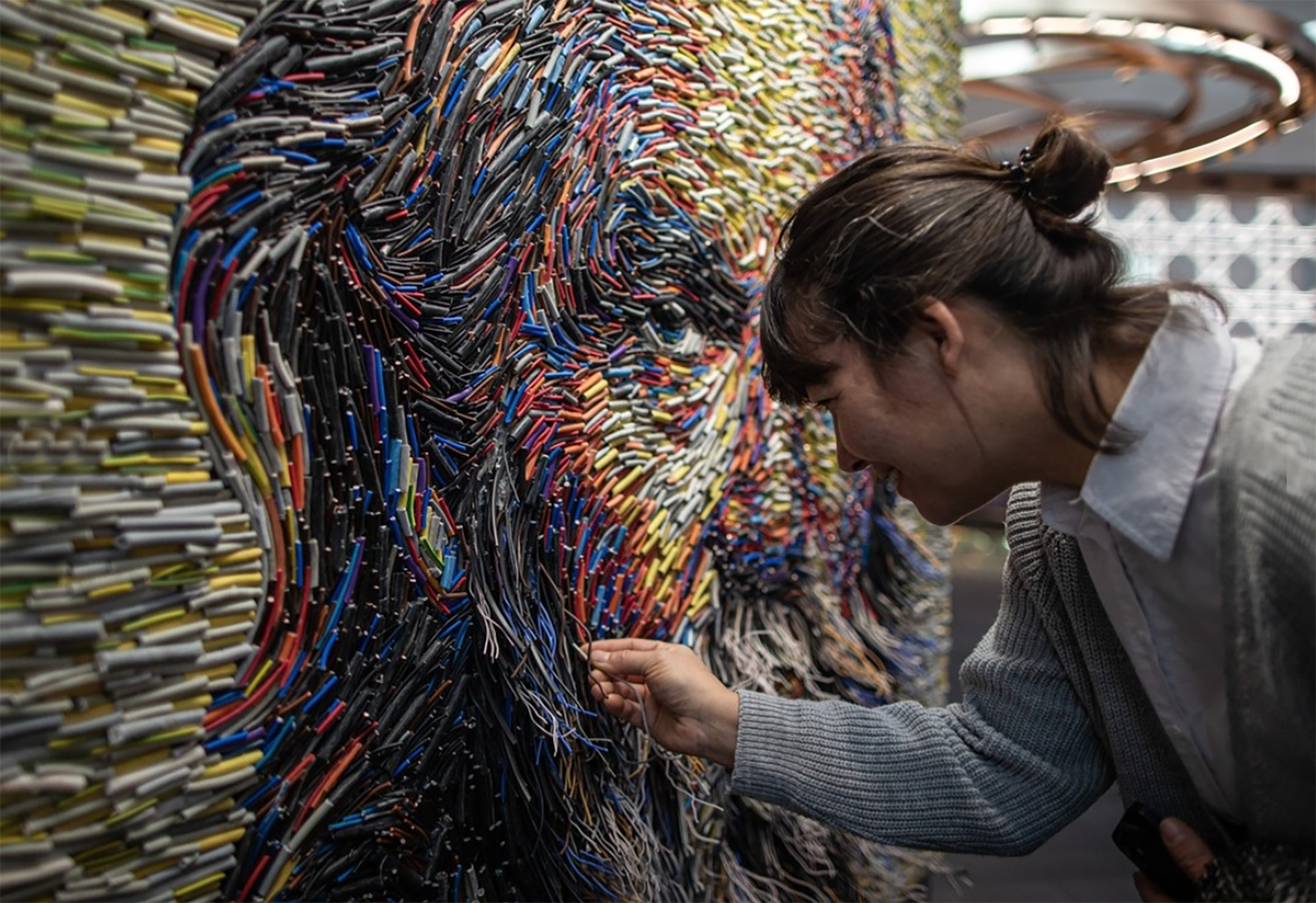
Deniz Sağdıç transforming waste collected at İGA Istanbul Airport Waste Systems into art, Istanbul, 2023

Sağdıç was born in 1982 in Mersin, Turkey. Since the early years of her art, she has become professional at various techniques such as sculpture, printing and engraving, and mostly oil paintings, and also she has produced works in the video and new media fields. For many years, she has developed researches and projects, which problematize the place of women in society. She has received a Master’s Degree in Art by means of her projects and article works with respect to such matter. She launched her project, which she has called as “Ready-ReMade”, in the period, during which the conceptual and classical discussion of current art hit the top. She has brought together the classical techniques and elements of the art with the current art forms by means of her project; accordingly, she has intended to bring the issue of “concept” in art up for discussion. She has presented the “Ready-Made” objects, which are mostly addressed by the current art, together with the classical painting and techniques, differently from the placements, which we have become accustomed to seeing frequently today. Sağdıç tries to create new intellectual areas to have the new meanings of such objects re-questioned, by bringing together some objects, which have become waste due to the fact that they have lost their function.

The Artist Deniz Sağdıç founded Sustainable Art House in 2023.

The Sustainable Art House established by the artist has 450m2 indoor and 300m2 outdoor area. The Sustainable Art House generates its own electricity with solar panels and transforms rainwater, household waste is used in organic agriculture. The building is the first sustainable art house as a fully insulated and self-sufficient building.

In 2025, Sağdıç's works were exhibited at Akasya and Akbatı shopping centres as part of a project marking the 20th anniversary of Akiş GYO, organised in collaboration with the Association for Art for Good.

The project later received a Gold Award in the "Public Relations & Communications / Corporate Social Responsibility" category at the Hermes Creative Awards.

During the same period, Sağdıç participated in sustainability-focused talks, workshops and public projects related to upcycling and environmental awareness. She also served as a jury member in projects organised by Vodafone and Halkbank. At Halkbank's Women Entrepreneurs Competition, she appeared on stage alongside Emine Erdoğan and Halkbank General Manager Osman Arslan.

Sağdıç also took part in events organised by Türkiye İş Bankası as part of its Social Impact Summit programme focusing on sustainability, social transformation and art.

Since 2024, Sağdıç has collaborated with Memorial Health Group on the "Art Heals" project, producing artworks from medical and technological waste materials collected from hospital environments.

Her corporate sustainability projects also include a large-scale artwork produced for Enerjisa using waste materials from electricity distribution operations. The work was installed at the entrance of Enerjisa's Ankara Kule building.

Sağdıç also participated in the "Dada Uzak Orman" event organised in collaboration with sahibinden.com and Artikel Agency, contributing works and workshops focused on electronic waste and reuse.

In 2026, Sağdıç presented works in Argentina as part of BAAS Congress in Buenos Aires and an exhibition at Unicenter Shopping. During the visit, her work on sustainable art was also featured by Argentine media.

A further exhibition of Sağdıç's works is scheduled to take place at Milan Malpensa Airport between June and September 2026 as part of Green Week. The project is centred around sustainable art and environmental awareness, and was announced as part of a cultural initiative contributing to dialogue between Turkey and Italy ahead of the planned COP summit in Antalya.

In 2026, Sağdıç also presented works at Ankara Esenboğa Airport's TAV Gallery. During the exhibition, she announced plans to create a large-scale portrait using abandoned suitcases left at airports.

== Art exhibitions ==
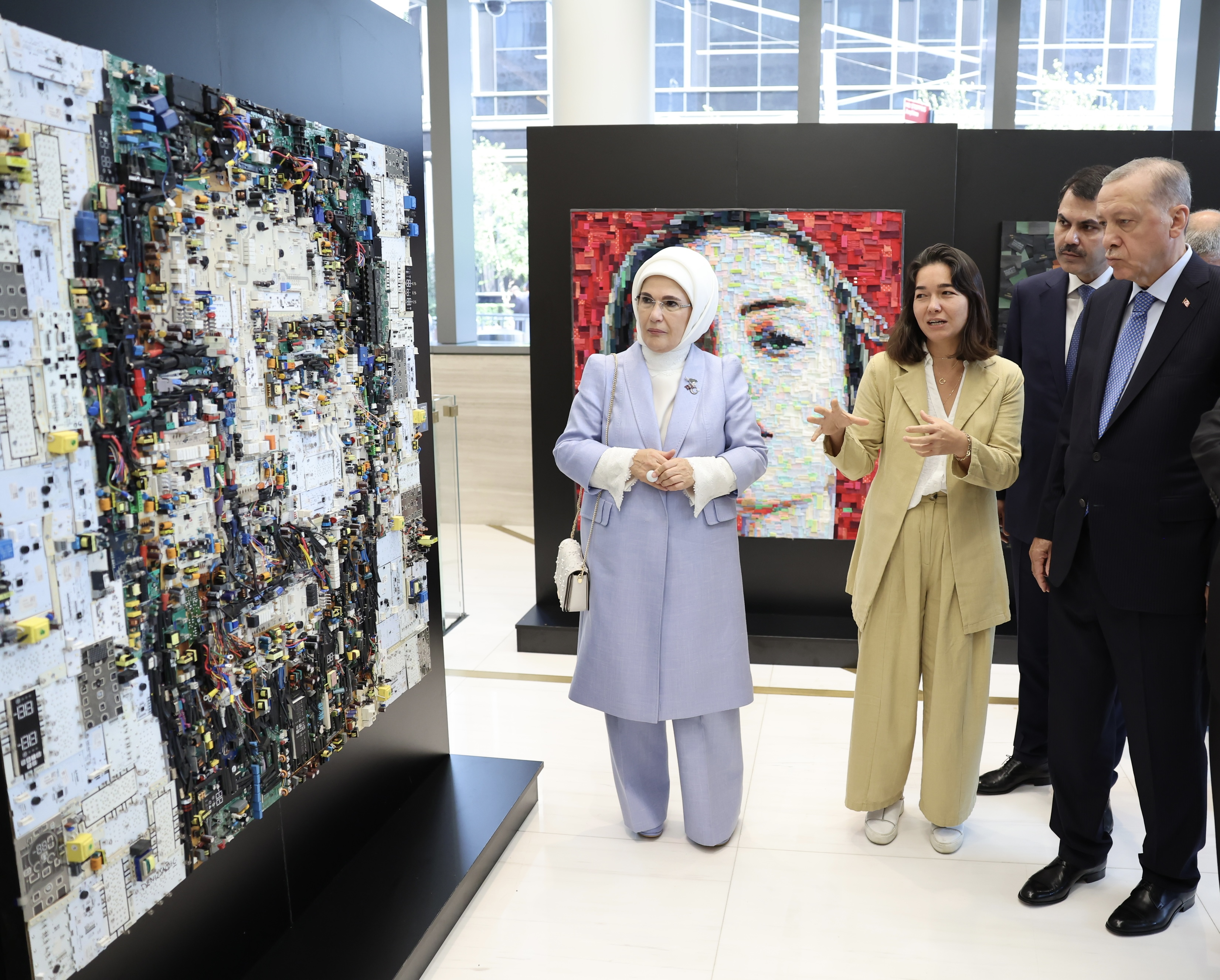
President Erdoğan visited "From Waste to Art" in New York

=== Solo exhibitions ===
- 0 Zero Point Unicenter Shopping Buenos Aires, 2026
- Art Heals Memorial Göztepe Hospital Istanbul, 2026
- 0 Zero Point TAV Gallery, Esenboğa Airport Ankara, 2026
- 0 Zero Point Cafer Sadık Abalıoğlu Eğitim ve Kültür Vakfı Denizli, 2025
- Ready Re-Made Akasya and Akbatı Istanbul, 2025
- 0 Zero Point Sokratin Arts & Culture Istanbul, 2024–2025
- Sustainable Art MÜSİAD Headquarters Istanbul, 2024
- 0 Zero Point Rixos Premium JBR Dubai, 2023
- "O Zero Point" Rixos Premium JBR Dubai 2023
- "O Zero Point" İGA Istanbul Airport Istanbul 2023
- "O Zero Point" COP’27 Egypt 2022
- "O Zero Point" World Habitat Day Balıkesir 2022
- "O Zero Point" Turkish House New York 2022
- "O Zero Point" Teknofest Samsun 2022
- "O Zero Point" The Presidential Complex Ankara 2022
- "Circular Economy Week of Turkey" French Palace Istanbul 2022
- "Circle" Bursa Zindankapı Museum Bursa 2022
- "O Zero Point" Istanbul Airport Istanbul 2022
- "Ready ReMade" Gallery Işık Teşvikiye Istanbul 2021
- "Ready ReMade" Fashion Prime İzmir 2020
- "Ready ReMade" YKK London Showroom London 2020 Çırağan Palace - Istanbul 2019
- "Denim ReMade" Denim Premiere Vision Milano - Milan 2019
- "Denim ReMade" Hong Kong Denim Festival - Hong Kong 2019
- "Fabric ReMade" Premiere Vision New York - New York 2019

"Someone" Architects' Association 1927 - Ankara 2018

- "Denim ReMade" Premiere Vision London - London 2018
- "Denim ReMade" Denim-Days Amsterdam - Amsterdam 2018
- "Denim ReMade" Denim-Days New York - New York 2018
- "Ready - ReMade" Vis Sanat in Istanbul 2016
- "The Soul" Gallery Çankaya,
- "The Soul" Atatürk Culture Arts And Convention Centre,
- "The Soul" Mine Art Gallery,
- "The Soul" Güneş Sigorta Art Gallery in Ankara, Eskişehir, Bodrum, Istanbul 2014 - 2016
- "Woman: Ownership", Renart Gallery, Iş Bank Art Gallery – Istanbul, İzmir 2013 - 2014
- "Dream And Real", Pinelo Gallery, Gama Gallery – Istanbul 2011 - 2013

=== Biennials ===
- 6th Çanakkale Biennial Çanakkale 2018
- 6th Thessaloniki Biennial Thessaloniki 2017
- Kyoto Art Quake 2015 Kyoto 2015

=== Workshops ===
- "Denim ReMade" Denim Premiere Vision Milano – Milan 2019
- "Fabric ReMade" Premiere Vision Paris – Paris 2019
- "Denim ReMade" Hong Kong Denim Festival – Hong Kong 2019
- "Denim ReMade" Premiere Vision London – London 2018
- "Denim ReMade" Denim-Days Amsterdam – Amsterdam 2018
- "Denim ReMade" Denim-Days New York – New York 2018
- "LEVI's x Deniz Sağdıç" Cappadox – Cappadocia 2018
- "Birlikte / Together" Uniq İstanbul – Istanbul 2017
- "Art For Civil Society Dialogue" UNESCO AIAP – Denizli 2015

=== Group exhibitions ===
- "A Selection from Hacı Sabancı Collection" – Istanbul 2019
- "ArtWeek Akaretler" Merkur Gallery, Akaretler – Istanbul 2019
- "Artist to Artist" Büyükdere35 Gallery – Istanbul 2019
- "Dualite" D Design Gallery – Istanbul 2018
- "X" Group Exhibition, Endless Art Taksim - Istanbul 2018
- "Identity: The Sheltered Place" Endless Art Taksim – Istanbul 2017
- "YTS Art", Lütfi Kırdar Cong. Centre – Istanbul 2017
- "Women in the Corner" Kare Art Gallery Istanbul 2017
- "Yaşa(t)mak Aşktır" Historical Ortaköy Orphanage- Istanbul 2017
- "Together" Turkmall Gallery – Istanbul 2017
- "Lovers" Uniq Gallery – Istanbul 2016
- "Day Dreams" Summart Gallery – Istanbul 2016
- "Under 40 Age, 40 Artısts" Adnan Saygun Culture Centre – İzmir 2015
- "Moonlight I" NK Gallery – Washington, D.C. 2015
- "States Of Material III" Armaggan Gallery – Istanbul 2015
- "Wearable Art" Summart Gallery – Istanbul 2015
- "New York Art Expo 2015" Gallery NK – New York – 2015
- "Art For Civil Society Dialogue" IAA Workshop Exhibition – Istanbul 2015
- "Kyoto Art Quake Biennale 2015" The Museum of Kyoto – Kyoto 2015
- "The Ribbon" Galatea Art Gallery – Istanbul 2015
- "Ask'a Randevu" The Historical Town Gas Factory Art Centre – İzmir 2015
