= Al Yazmalım =

Turkish television series

- Genre: Drama, Romance
- Created by: Chinghiz Aitmatov
- Based on: My Poplar Is a Red Scarf by Chinghiz Aitmatov
- Screenplay by: Mahinur Ergün
- Directed by: Nisan Akman
- Starring: Seçkin Özdemir; Özge Özpirinçci; Barış Falay; Nesrin Cavadzade; Saygın Soysal; Ahmet Saraçoğlu; Gözde Kansu; Zeynep Arolat; Macit Koper; Münir Caner; Hazal Çamlıdere
- Theme music composer: Cahit Berkay
- Composer: Toygar Işıklı
- Country of origin: Turkey
- Original language: Turkish
- No. of seasons: 1
- No. of episodes: 37

Production
- Producer: Kerem Çatay
- Production location: Istanbul, Turkey
- Running time: 60 minutes (avarenge)
- Production company: Ay Yapım

Original release
- Network: ATV
- Release: September 12, 2011 – June 5, 2012

Related
- The Girl with the Red Scarf

Al Yazmalım (English: The Girl with the Red Scarf) is a Turkish television series based on the novel My Poplar in a Red Scarf by Chinghiz Aitmatov and 1978 Turkish romantic drama film The Girl with the Red Scarf. It is broadcast on ATV.

== Cast ==
Actor	Role
Özge Özpirinçci	Asiye Has
Seçkin Özdemir	İlyas Avcı
Barış Falay	Cemşit Ateş
Nesrin Cavadzade	Ayça
Ece Dizdar	Nermin
Gözde Duru	Saliha
Burak Önal	Ömer
Bahadır Vatanoğlu	Zafer
Gözde Kansu	Helin
Orhan Alkaya	Salih Usta
Saygın Soysal	Tahir
