= İrem Helvacıoğlu =

Turkish actress (born 1990)

- Born: 2 February 1990 (age 36); Germany
- Occupation: Actress
- Years active: 2010–present
- Spouse: Ural Kaspar (m. 2024; div. 2026)
- Children: 1

İrem Helvacıoğlu (born 2 February 1990) is a Turkish actress. She is best known for her role in Sen Anlat Karadeniz as Nefes Kaleli.

== Career ==
Helvacıoğlu was born on 2 February 1990 in Germany. Her family is originally from Ankara. Her father is a colonel in the Turkish army. Her grandfather, an Albanian by descent, immigrated from Thessaloniki during the Ottoman Empire. She took acting lessons at Müjdat Gezen Art Center and had her first role on stage at the age of 11.

In 2014, she had her first cinematic experience with a role in the movie Aşkın Dili. She made her television debut with a supporting role in the TV series Behzat Ç. Bir Ankara Polisiyesi. She was later cast in popular series such as Muhteşem Yüzyıl, Kurtlar Vadisi Pusu and Güneşin Kızları. Meanwhile, she continued her career in cinema with leading roles Organik Aşk Hikâyeleri, Babası and Kızım ve Ben. In 2016, she portrayed the character of Pelin Su in the series No 309.

She had her first leading role on TV in the series Sen Anlat Karadeniz, for which she won a Golden Butterfly Award with Ulaş Tuna Astepe as the Best TV Couple. In 2020, she was cast as the leading character in the series Seni Çok Bekledim and portrayed the character of Ayliz.

In 2021, Helvacıoğlu went on to star as a leading character alongside Seçkin Özdemir in the romantic comedy Baş Belası, where she played crime psychologist Dr. İpek Gümüşçü. With Engin Öztürk, she played in series Annenin Sırrıdır Çocuk. She played in series Yürek Çıkmazı alongside Alp Navruz.

She played a blind character in festival premiered film Eflatun alongside Kerem Bürsin. In 2022, she shared the leading role in the Disney+ series Kaçış with Engin Akyürek.

== Filmography ==
Film
Year	Title	Role	Notes
2014	Gemma Bovery	-	Supporting role
2016	Organik Aşk Hikâyeleri	Özge	Leading role
2017	Babası	Aslı	Supporting role
2018	Kızım ve Ben	Serap	Leading role
2020	Eflatun	Eflâtun	Leading role
Web series
Year	Title	Role	Notes
2010	Behzat Ç. Bir Ankara Polisiyesi	Narin	Supporting role
2022	Kaçış	Zeynep Karaca	Leading role
TV series
Year	Title	Role	Episode
2012	Muhteşem Yüzyıl	Nurbahar Hatun (Clara)	
2013–2014	Kurtlar Vadisi Pusu	Esra Türkmen	
2015	Güneşin Kızları	Tuğçe	
2016–2017	No 309	Pelinsu Yalın	
2018–2019	Sen Anlat Karadeniz	Nefes Zorlu Kaleli	1-64
2021	Seni Çok Bekledim	Ayliz Göksü	1-13
2021	Baş Belası	İpek Gümüşçü	1-13
2022	Annenin Sırrıdır Çocuk	Defne Yılmaz	1-11
2022–2023	Yürek Çıkmazı	Zeynep Önder	1-28
2024	Karadut	Zuhal Erdem	1-
2026	Tuzlu Kahve	Nefes	11
