= Mersin University =

Turkish public university located in Mersin

Coordinates: 36.7861°N 34.5258°E

- Mersin Üniversitesi
- Motto: A world university in the light of science and modernity
- Type: Public university
- Established: July 3, 1992
- Rector: Prof.Dr.Erol Yaşar
- Faculty: 1405
- Administrative staff: 866
- Students: 26,644
- Location: Mersin, Turkey
- Colors: Ultramarine & orange
- Website: mersin.edu.tr

Mersin University (Turkish: Mersin Üniversitesi) is a public university, built in 1992 in Mersin Province, Turkey. It has about 39,000 students, 1,813 academic staff, and a number of foreign and guest academic staff.

The university has research and sports facilities, in Mersin town centre and in other towns.

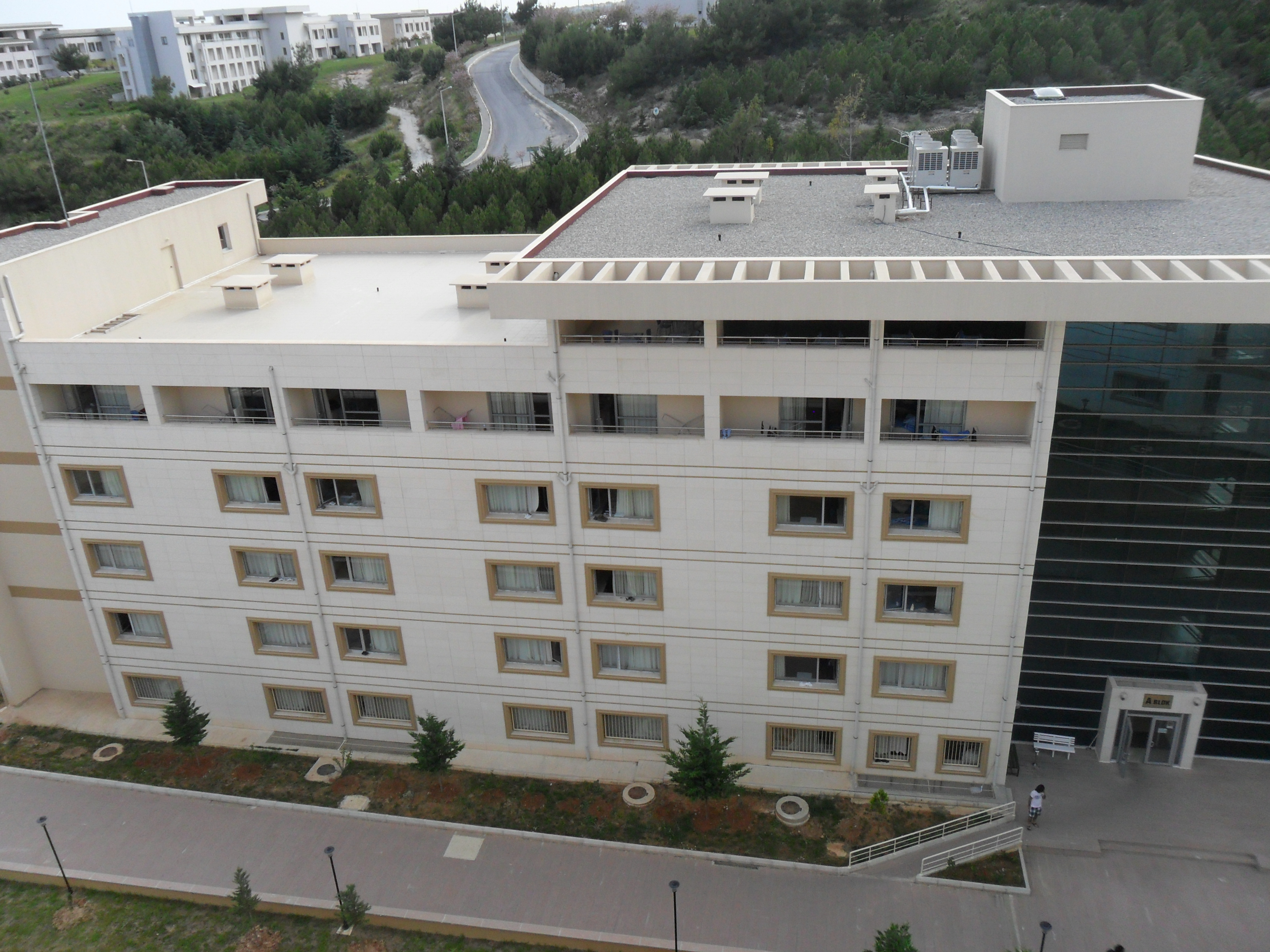
Mersin University Dorms

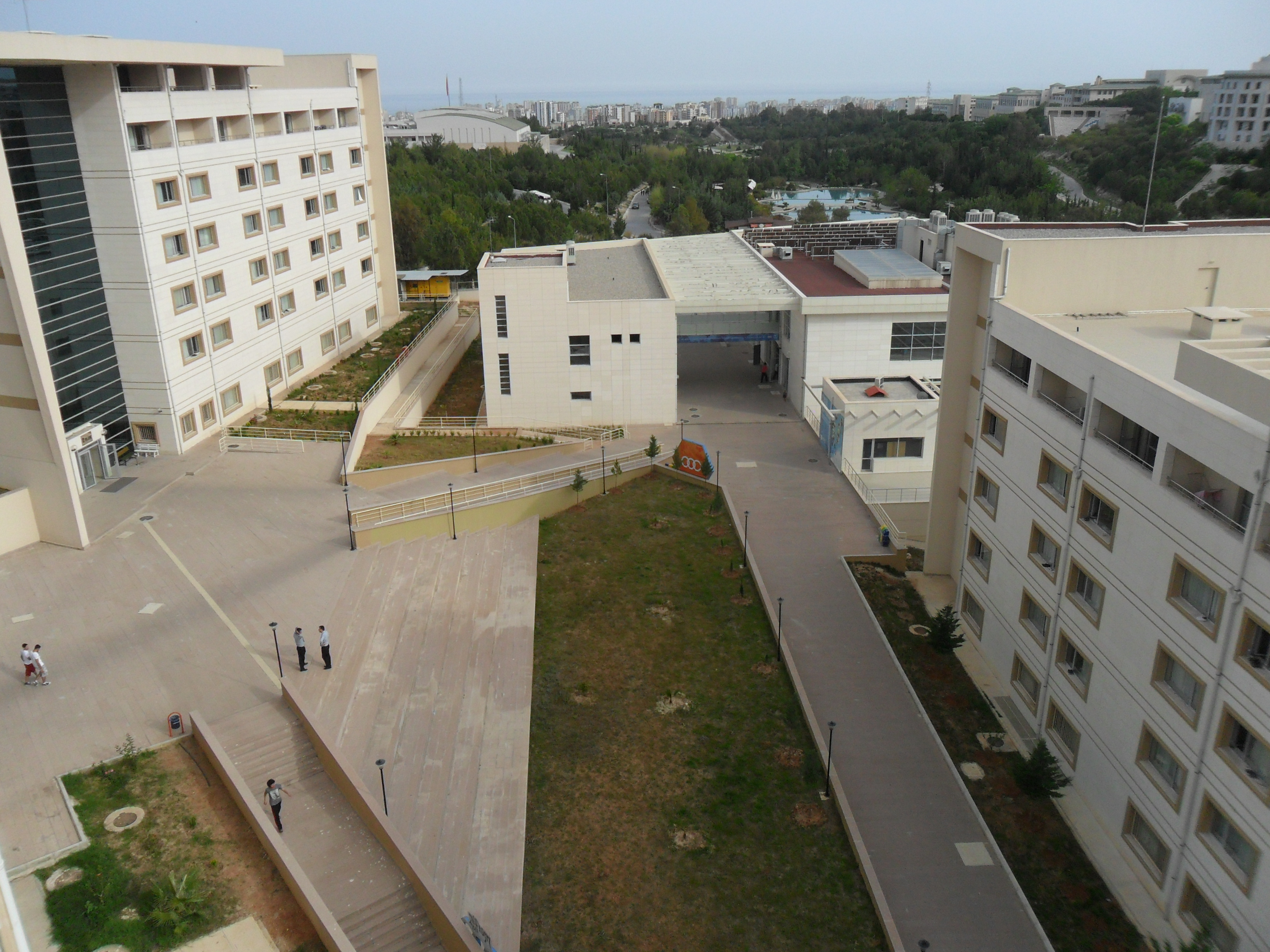
Mersin University Campus

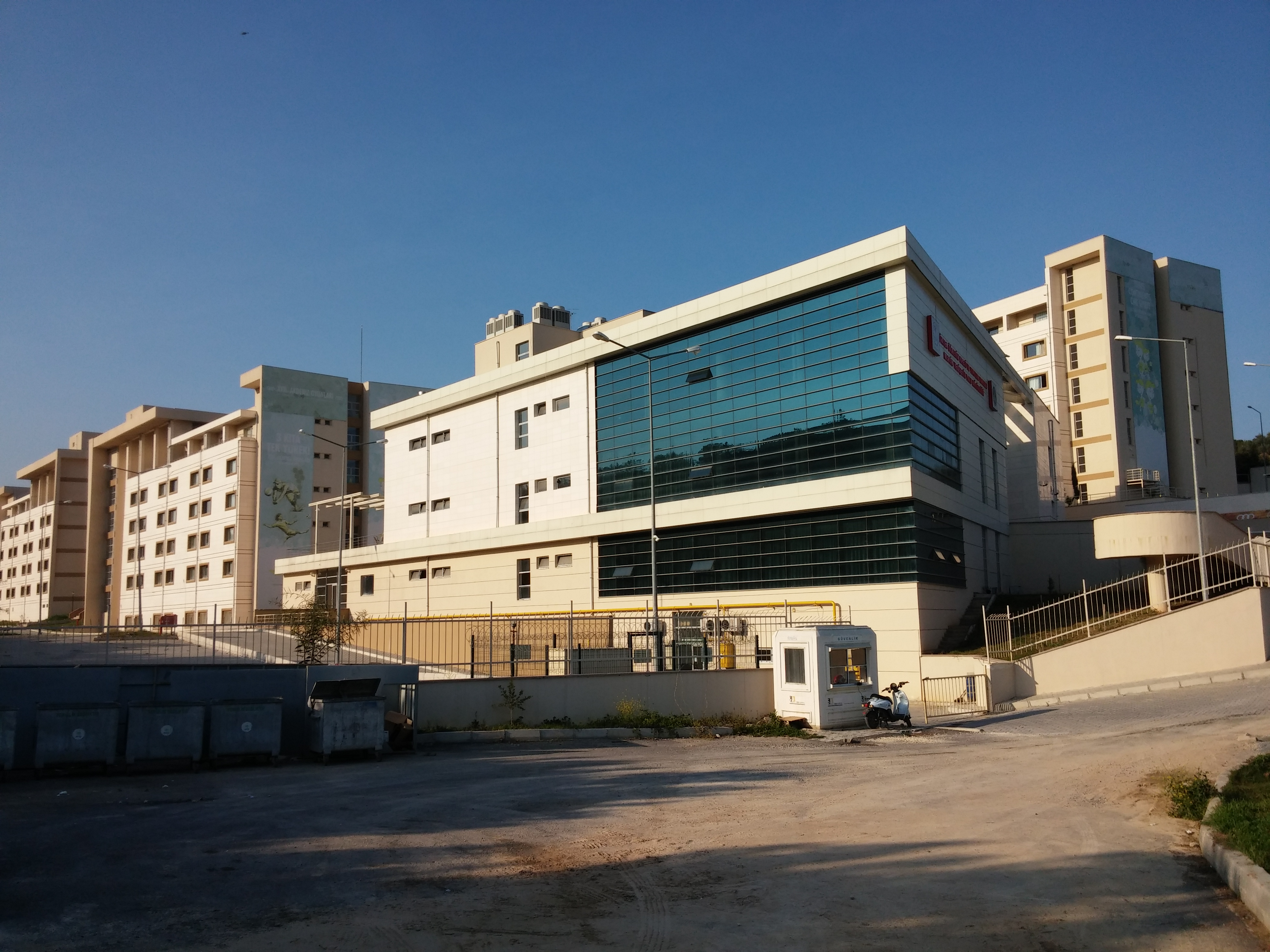
Mersin University Dorms

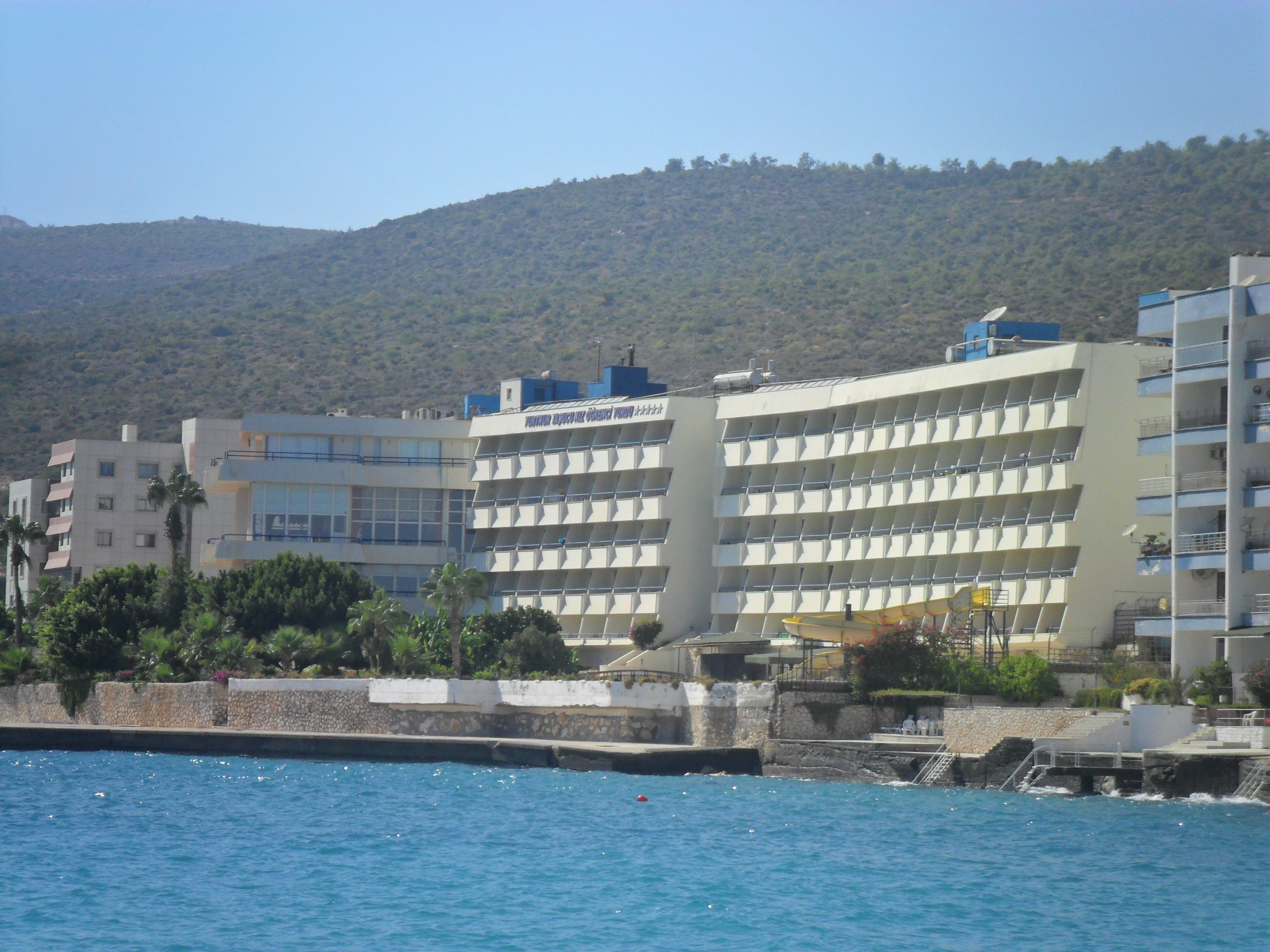
Mersin University Dorms

In 2005 the Mersin Technology Development Zone (Technoscope) was set up, creating a partnership between the university's research and development departments and industry, with the aim of developing new technologies that could be directly translated into industrial production.

== Departments ==
- Faculty of Engineering
- Faculty of Economics and Managerial Sciences
- Faculty of Arts and Science
- Faculty of Fine Arts
- Faculty of Water Resources
- Faculty of Pharmacy
- Faculty of Medicine
- Faculty of Architecture
- Faculty of Educational Sciences
- Faculty of Tarsus Technical Education
- Faculty of Communication

== Notable alumni ==
- Deniz Sağdıç, artist
- Elçin Sangu, actress
- Dirayet Taşdemir, politician
- Nevin Yanıt, Turkish female sprinter
- Sebahat Tuncel, politician
- Ayberk Pekcan, actor
- Turabi Çamkıran, MMA fighter and actor
- Erkan Meriç, model and actor
- Tuğçe Kandemir, singer-songwriter and literature teacher
- Dilek Öcalan, politician
