= Ayberk Pekcan =

Turkish actor (1970–2022)

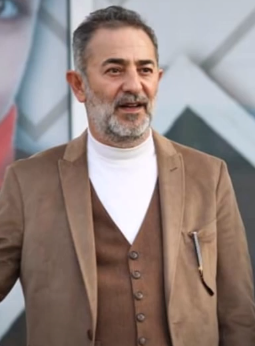
- Ayberk Pekcan in Pakistan
- Born: 22 May 1970; Mersin, Turkey
- Died: 24 January 2022 (aged 51); Mersin, Turkey
- Education: Mersin University
- Occupation: Actor
- Years active: 1995–2022

Ayberk Pekcan (22 May 1970 – 24 January 2022) was a Turkish actor and former civil servant, politician and labourer.

== Life and career ==
Born on 22 May 1970 in Mersin, Ayberk Pekcan spent his childhood and youth in Adana and his birthplace. After studying his primary and secondary education in Adana and high school in Mersin, he graduated from Mersin University Faculty of Fine Arts, Department of Theater. Pekcan was a labourer, a civil servant, and a teacher. He was a political member of the Social Democratic Populist Party in 1991 in local government. In 2001, he resigned as a civil servant, settled in Istanbul and became a TV and film actor.

=== 2001–2015 ===
He played leading roles in television series Ihlamurlar Altında, Yaprak Dökümü, Kurtlar Vadisi and Keşanlı Ali Destanı. In 2010, his film, Saç received awards at national and international film festivals. He won best supporting actor at the Ankara International Film Festival. Ayberk Pekcan, who has starred in many films and series, played the role of Artuk Bey in the popular TV series Diriliş: Ertuğrul.

=== 2015–2019: Diriliş: Ertuğrul ===
As Diriliş: Ertuğrul was well received in Pakistan, Ayberk Pekcan, along with Nurettin Sönmez, who plays the role of Bamsı Beyrek, arrived in the country to meet fans in 2020 on a three-day visit. They came with Turkish Foreign Minister Mevlüt Çavuşoğlu and a 20-member delegation. On their visit, they met Pakistani actor Hamza Ali Abbasi's sister Dr. Fazeela Abbasi and Nurettin Sönmez was "humbled" by Pakistani Prime Minister Imran Khan's appreciation of Diriliş: Ertuğrul while also expressing his desire to work with Pakistani actors. On the occasion, Ayberk Pekcan said, “...Pakistan and Turkey are brotherly countries, people of both countries are also brothers and Pakistan is our second homeland...” Before leaving, they also visited the Pak-Turk Maarif Chak Shahzad Campus, in Islamabad. Pekcan was also staying in touch with the Kuruluş: Osman cast, the sequel to Diriliş: Ertuğrul, sharing an image with them on Instagram.

=== Death ===
Ayberk Pekcan died from lung cancer in Mersin on 24 January 2022, at the age of 51.

== Filmography ==
=== Film ===
- Dilberay (2022)
- Mustang (2015) - Erol
- Kış Uykusu (2014) - Hıdayet
- Aşk ve Devrim (2011) - Pala
- Saç (2010) - Hamdi
- Ali'nin Sekiz Günü (2008) - Hacı
- Neredesin Firuze (2003) - Pislik
- Şeytan Bunun Neresinde (2002) - Köy Muhtarı/Terörist Başı
- Abdülhamid Düşerken (2002) - Katip Ali Şevki

=== Television ===
- Diriliş: Ertuğrul (2015–2019) - Artuk Bey
- Sevdam Alabora (2015) - Hakan
- Poyraz Karayel (2014)
- Bir Aşk Hikayesi (2013) - Tahsin
- Keşanlı Ali Destanı (2011-2012) - Teke Kazım
- Kurtlar Vadisi Pusu (2008-2010) - Şemo
- Yaprak Dökümü (2007) - Talat
- Körfez Ateşi (2005) - Esat
- Ihlamurlar Altında (2005) - Ekrem/Aynalı
- Emanet ve İhanet (2004) - Ali
- Dağlar Dağımdır (2005)
- Türkü Filmi (2004)
- Taşı Sıksam Suyunu Çıkarırım (2004)
- Bir Dilim Aşk (2004) - Bülent
- Kurtlar Vadisi (2004) - Doctor
- Parmak İzi (2003)
- Kampüsistan (2003)
- Hayat Bilgisi (2003) - Mustafa
- Yarım Elma (2002)
- Sırlar Dünyası (2002) - Muammer
- Bayanlar Baylar (2002)
- Tatlı Hayat (2001)

== Awards and nominations ==
Awards
Year	Awards ceremony	Category	Project	Result	Ref.
2011	Turkish Film Critics Association (SIYAD) Awards	Best Actor	Saç	Won	
2012	Ankara International Film Festival	Best Supporting Actor	Aşk ve Devrim	Won	
2014	Turkish Film Critics Association (SIYAD) Awards	Best Supporting Actor	Winter Sleep	Won	
2015	Sadri Alisik Theatre and Cinema Awards	20th Anniversary Special Jury Award for Outstanding Performance	Winter Sleep	Won	
2016	Golden Palm Awards	Supporting TV Series Actor of the Year	Diriliş: Ertuğrul	Won	
