= Sen Anlat Karadeniz =

Turkish television series

- Also known as: Lifeline
- Genre: Drama
- Written by: Ayşe Ferda Eryılmaz; Nehir Erdem
- Directed by: Osman Sınav; Emre Kabakuşak
- Starring: Ulaş Tuna Astepe; İrem Helvacıoğlu; Mehmet Ali Nuroğlu; Sinan Tuzcu; Öykü Gürman
- Theme music composer: Ender Gündüzlü; Metin Arıgül
- Country of origin: Turkey
- Original language: Turkish
- No. of seasons: 3
- No. of episodes: 64

Production
- Producer: Osman Sınav
- Production locations: Trabzon, Turkey; Istanbul, Turkey
- Running time: 150 minutes
- Production company: Sinegraf Film

Original release
- Network: ATV
- Release: January 24, 2018 – November 13, 2019

Sen Anlat Karadeniz (English title: Tell them, Black Sea) is a Turkish drama television series, starring Ulaş Tuna Astepe, İrem Helvacıoğlu, Mehmet Ali Nuroğlu, Sinan Tuzcu and Öykü Gürman. It premiered on ATV on January 24, 2018.

== Plot ==
Nefes was only 16 years old when she was sold to a rich abusive man, Vedat Sayar, under the name of "marriage". Nefes had a tough life and had been locked up in house, tortured for 8 years long in Vedat's mansion in Istanbul. In her 25th attempt, Nefes manages to escape from the "living hell" with her 7 years old son, Yiğit, who was a result of a rape. Her escape was a complete coincidence that happened during a visit of a small town, cultural family from The Black Sea region. One of the sons, Tahir, who didn't know Nefes and her son are hiding in his car trunk, discovers that when he arrives to his home town, Trabzon, that is 562 miles away. As a man born and raised in the Black Sea Region, Tahir is ready to give his life for any person treated unjustly. Tahir sacrifices himself to save Nefes and her son. While doing so, he faces many challenges including exposing himself and his family to the threat of Nefes' kidnapper, who was also known as her abuser, Vedat, as well as the rejection of some of his family and his town to Nefes; as protecting a "married" woman with a child is considered "against traditions" in his hometown. Amidst all this, Nefes and Tahir fall in love.

== Cast ==
- Ulaş Tuna Astepe as Tahir Kaleli; Nefes' husband and Yiğit's and Masal father
- İrem Helvacıoğlu as Nefes Kaleli / Nefes Zorlu; Tahir's wife, Vedat's former victim and Yiğit's and Masal mother
- Mehmet Ali Nuroğlu as Vedat Sayar / Vedat Deliçay; Nefes' kidnapper/abuser, Nazar's former husband and abuser and Yiğit's biological father
- Sinan Tuzcu as Mustafa Kaleli; Saniye's eldest son, Asiye's husband and Balım's father
- Ali Ersan Duru as Ferhat
- Gözde Kansu as Eyşan Sayar; Vedat's cousin
- Öykü Gürman as Asiye Kaleli; Mustafa's wife and Balım's mother
- Sait Genay as Osman Hopalı; the imam, Asiye's father, Nefes' father-figure and Esma's uncle
- Nurşim Demir as Saniye Kaleli; Mustafa, Murat and Fatih's mother
- Cem Kenar as Murat Kaleli; Saniye's twin son and Nazar's love interest
- Furkan Aksoy as Fatih Kaleli; Saniye's twin son and Berrak's love interest
- İlayda Çevik as Berrak Yilmaz; Fatih's love interest and Necip's daughter
- Belfu Benian as Mercan Dağdeviren; Cemil and Türkan's eldest daughter, Nazar's older sister and Tahir's ex fiancée
- Çağla Özavcı as Nazar Dağdeviren / Sayar; Cemil and Türkan's youngest daughter, Mercan's younger sister, Vedat's former wife and Murat's lover
- Hilmi Özçelik as Cemil Dağdeviren; Mercan and Nazar's father
- Nalan Kuruçim as Türkan Dağdeviren; Mercan and Nazar's mother
- Şendoğan Öksüz as Cemal Reis; Tahir's assistant/helper
- Emre Ön as İdris; Nuran's husband and family friend of Kalelis
- Faruk Acar as Necip; Vedat's right-hand man and Berrak's father
- Demir Birinci as Yiğit Kaleli; Nefes and Vedat's son, Tahir's adoptive son
- Dilek Aktaş as Balım Kaleli; Mustafa and Asiye's daughter
- Senem Göktürk as Nuran; Idris's wife and family friend of the Kalelis
- Duygu Üstünbaş as Esma Hopalı; a lawyer, Osman's niece, Asiye's cousin and Ali's lover and wife
- Mehmet Çepiç as Commissioner Mithat Bozok; Chief police of Trabzon
- Can Verel as Doctor Volkan Darici; Nefes and Mercan's doctor
- Temmuz Gürkan Karaca as Ali; Tahir's friend and Esma's husband
- Uğur Çavuşoğlu as Genco
- Emine Türkyılmaz as Ceylan; Berrak's younger sister
- Dilek Denizdelen as Naciye; Neighbour of the Kalelis
- Erdal Cindoruk as Fikret Deliçay

== Series overview ==
Series	Episodes	Originally released	
Series	Episodes	First released	Last released
1	21	24 January 2018	6 June 2018
2	32	19 September 2018	29 May 2019
3	11	4 September 2019	13 November 2019

== Awards and nominations ==
Year	Award	Category	Recipient	Result	Ref.
2018	Golden Butterfly Awards	Best Screenwriter	Ayşe Ferda Eryılmaz and Nehir Erdem	Won	
2018	Golden Butterfly Awards	Best Director	Osman Sınav, Emre Kabakuşak y Yusuf Ömer Sınav	Won	
2018	Golden Butterfly Awards	Best Couple	İrem Helvacıoğlu – Ulaş Tuna Astepe	Won	
2018	Golden Butterfly Awards	Best Child Actor	Demir Birinci	Won	
2018	Golden Butterfly Awards	Best Actress	İrem Helvacıoğlu	Nominated	
2018	Golden Butterfly Awards	Best Actor	Ulaş Tuna Astepe	Nominated	
2018	Golden Butterfly Awards	Best TV Series	Sen Anlat Karadeniz	Nominated	
2018	Golden Butterfly Awards	Best OST	Ender Gündüzlü – Metin Arıgül	Nominated	

== Controversy ==
Due to its frequent use of scenes with sexual violence, several complaints were sent to RTÜK to stop the series' broadcast.
