= Baş Belası =

- Genre: Romance; Action; Comedy
- Screenplay by: Gülsev Karagöz; Zafer Özer Çetinel; Ahmet Orçun Okşar; Ramazan Demirli
- Directed by: Murat Onbul
- Starring: İrem Helvacıoğlu; Seçkin Özdemir
- Country of origin: Turkey
- Original language: Turkish
- No. of seasons: 1
- No. of episodes: 13

Production
- Producer: Fatih Enes Ömeroğlu
- Production location: Istanbul
- Running time: 150 minutes
- Production company: ARC Film

Original release
- Network: ATV
- Release: June 20 – September 10, 2021

Baş Belası (Nuisance) is a Turkish television drama in action and comedy genre. It is produced by ARC film, directed by Murat Onbul and screenplayed by several screenwriters like Gülsev Karagöz, Zafer Özer Çetinel, Ahmet Orçun Okşar, and Ramazan Demirli. The series, in which İrem Helvacıoğlu and Seçkin Özdemir starred, first premiered on June 20, 2021, and ended on September 10, 2021, with 13 episodes.

== Plot ==
It is about the experiences of İpek Gümüşçü, a woman who devoted herself to her family, when she started working as a psychologist in the police department as a result of the events that shook her life deeply. İpek's detective interest, which has been her passion since childhood, will often bring her against the head of the homicide bureau, Şahin Kara. 'Baş Belası' (The troublemaker) is the fun stories of these two characters, which are diametrically opposed to each other, decorated with detective adventures.

== Cast ==
- İrem Helvacıoğlu – İpek Gümüşçü
- Seçkin Özdemir – Şahin Kara
- Dilara Aksüyek – Nazlı Tüzün
- Bülent Düzgünoğlu – Mehmet Yağcı
- Neşe Baykent – Perihan Aydoğan
- Taner Rumeli – Yener Yılmaz
- Yılmaz Kunt – Doruk Akkaya
- Buçe Buse Kahraman – Nermin Kuşçu
- Mert Yavuzcan – Birol Tüzün
- Ergül Miray Şahin – Betül Gülmez
- Özgür Cem Tuğluk – Umut Ertek
- Eyüp Mert İlkıs – Görkem Gümüşçü

== General View ==
| Season | Number of Episodes | Original release date | | |
| Season | Number of Episodes | Start date | End date | Channel |
|---|---|---|---|---|
| 1 | 13 | June 20, 2021 | September 10, 2021 (Final) | ATV |

== Episodes ==
| Episode | Director | Screenwriter | Release date | Rating | Place |
|---|---|---|---|---|---|
| Episode 1 | Murat Onbul | Gulsev Karagoz, Zafer Ozer Cetinel, Ahmet Orcun Oksar, Ramazan Demirli | June 20, 2021 | 3.55 | 3 |
| Episode 2 | Murat Onbul | Gulsev Karagoz, Zafer Ozer Cetinel, Ahmet Orcun Oksar, Ramazan Demirli | June 27, 2021 | 3.91 | 3 |
| Episode 3 | Murat Onbul | Gulsev Karagoz, Zafer Ozer Cetinel, Ahmet Orcun Oksar, Ramazan Demirli | July 4, 2021 | 3.10 | 2 |
| Episode 4 | Murat Onbul | Gulsev Karagoz, Zafer Ozer Cetinel, Ahmet Orcun Oksar, Ramazan Demirli | July 11, 2021 | 2.44 | 3 |
| Episode 5 | Murat Onbul | Gulsev Karagoz, Zafer Ozer Cetinel, Ahmet Orcun Oksar, Ramazan Demirli | July 18, 2021 | 2.03 | 3 |
| Episode 6 | Murat Onbul | Gulsev Karagoz, Zafer Ozer Cetinel, Ahmet Orcun Oksar, Ramazan Demirli | July 25, 2021 | 2.48 | 2 |
| Episode 7 | Murat Onbul | Gulsev Karagoz, Zafer Ozer Cetinel, Ahmet Orcun Oksar, Ramazan Demirli | August 1, 2021 | 1.92 | 5 |
| Episode 8 | Murat Onbul | Gulsev Karagoz, Zafer Ozer Cetinel, Ahmet Orcun Oksar, Ramazan Demirli | August 6, 2021 | 1.75 | 6 |
| Episode 9 | Murat Onbul | Gulsev Karagoz, Zafer Ozer Cetinel, Ahmet Orcun Oksar, Ramazan Demirli | August 13, 2021 | 1.51 | 9 |
| Episode 10 | Murat Onbul | Gulsev Karagoz, Zafer Ozer Cetinel, Ahmet Orcun Oksar, Ramazan Demirli | August 20, 2021 | 1.41 | 9 |
| Episode 11 | Murat Onbul | Gulsev Karagoz, Zafer Ozer Cetinel, Ahmet Orcun Oksar, Ramazan Demirli | August 27, 2021 | 1.66 | 7 |
| Episode 12 | Murat Onbul | Gulsev Karagoz, Zafer Ozer Cetinel, Ahmet Orcun Oksar, Ramazan Demirli | September 3, 2021 | 1.71 | 15 |
| Episode 13 (Final) | Murat Onbul | Gulsev Karagoz, Zafer Ozer Cetinel, Ahmet Orcun Oksar, Ramazan Demirli | September 10, 2021 | 1.52 | 17 |
