= Bir Aşk Hikayesi =

- Genre: Drama, Romance
- Based on: I'm Sorry, I Love You
- Developed by: Özer Erten
- Written by: Makbule Kosif; Funda Çetin; Pınar Uysal; Zehra Güleray
- Directed by: Barış Yöş; Murat Onbul
- Starring: Seçkin Özdemir; Damla Sönmez; Yamaç Telli; Elçin Sangu; Güneş Sayın; Zuhal Olcay
- Country of origin: Turkey
- Original language: Turkish
- No. of seasons: 1
- No. of episodes: 36

Production
- Producers: Faruk Bayhan; Fatih Aksoy
- Editor: Engin Öztürk
- Camera setup: Multi-camera
- Running time: 110 min
- Production company: MF Yapım

Original release
- Network: FOX
- Release: 26 March 2013 – 14 January 2014

Bir Aşk Hikayesi (English title: A Love Story) is a Turkish television drama series produced by MF Yapım. It was an adaptation of the popular South Korean television series I'm Sorry, I Love You. The series was broadcast on FOX, starring Seçkin Özdemir, Damla Sönmez, Yamaç Telli, Elçin Sangu, Güneş Sayın, and Zuhal Olcay. It was developed by Özer Erten.

== Synopsis ==
In the city of Stuttgart in Germany, poor yet blitheful and handsome orphan Korkut Ali's life shattered when he learned his beloved girlfriend Aslı had decided to marry his adoptive brother Yılmaz for his money. On their engagement ceremony, a bullet intended for them ended up in Korkut's brain, giving him less than a year to live. He arrived in Istanbul with hopes of finding his birth mother, believing she had left him in the orphanage after birth because she was poor. He soon discovered he had a twin sister, Emine, a young mother abandoned like him and suffering from learning disability. When Korkut learned that their mother was Gönül Karanlı, a famous singer living a lavish and happy life with her famous singer son, Tolga Karanlı, Korkut decided to take revenge.

It wasn't long before he fell in love with Tolga's assistant, Ceylan German, whom he had saved earlier back in Germany. However, Ceylan had been deeply in love with Tolga since childhood, while Tolga was madly in love with famous actress Eda Çağlar. While Korkut dealt with his love issues, he struggled with his vengeance as well as the pain of surviving with a bullet in his head. Additionally, it seemed his past always found a way to catch up with him wherever he was, and his secrets teetered to the brink of exposure.

== Plot ==
Poor yet handsome Korkut Ali (Seçkin Özdemir) was adopted at age two from a Turkish orphanage. He was taken to Germany, where his parents would abuse him until his adoptive brother, Yılmaz (Fatih Dönmez) runs away with him. The two lived in the streets, where Yilmaz gets secretly associated with the underground world while Korkut takes part in an organization that tricks tourists for a living.

Years later, Korkut lives a happy life in Stuttgart with hopes of marrying his girlfriend Aslı (Ayşin Yeşim Çapanoğlu) someday. When he prepares to marry Asli, he learns that she had a secret relationship with him and Yilmaz at the same time. Yilmaz plans to marry Asli before Korkut can, and Asli agrees due to Yilmaz's fortune. Korkut was left broken at the discovery.

Meanwhile, Turkish singer Tolga Karanlı (Yamaç Telli), his assistant, Ceylan German (Damla Sönmez), and love interest Eda (Elçin Sangu), arrive in Germany from Turkey for a shooting. Ceylan has been in love with Tolga since childhood, but has never confessed and does everything she can to please him. Heartbroken after seeing Tolga's crazy love for Eda, she attempts to leave for Turkey, only to be tricked out of all her belongings by a man working in the same gang as Korkut. While he initially refuses to help her, he eventually takes pity and returns her belongings to her and saves her from men on the street. Ceylan goes back to Turkey.

Before Yilmaz and Asli's engagement ceremony, he tries to win Asli over one last time, but fails. He watches the ceremony take place with a broken heart and attempts to leave, but upon seeing a man shooting Yilmaz on the shoulder and trying to shoot Asli next, he takes the bullet for her, which lands in his brain. After spending a month in the hospital, they informed him that he has less than a year to live and will suffer from severe headaches until then. Doing a surgery would be dangerous as he had more than a 90 percent chance of dying in the surgery. Asli convinces Korkut to fulfill his dream of finding his birth mother in Turkey and spend his last days happily. Korkut does, but not before robbing Yilmaz of his money, blaming him for his situation.

In Turkey, he learns he has a twin sister named Emine (Güneş Sayın) with mental issues after a car hit her in an orphanage at age seven. He also learns his mother is Gönül Karanlı (Zuhal Olcay), a famous singer. This enrages him as he thought his whole life that his mother gave him up due to financial situations. In hopes of taking revenge, he goes after Tolga, forming a brotherly bond with him. He eventually falls in love with Ceylan, who begins to develop mutual feelings as she realizes that with him, she feels like she matters—unlike when she's with Tolga, where everything revolves around him.

But soon, things start to get complicated: Tolga starts to fall in love with Ceylan, Yilmaz comes after Korkut when Asli flees to Turkey and begs him for protection, his attempts to bond with his sister and nephew, his physical pain due to the bullet in his brain, Tolga gets into an accident that makes him lose his voice and give him a weak heart, Korkut poses an orphaned girl, Cennet (Deniz Denker), as Gönül Karanlı's missing child, Memduh Sayın (Ahmet Uz), Korkut's biological father and dangerous underground leader, returns after thinking Cennet is his true child, everyone starts to learn Tolga is adopted, and his discovery that Tahsin German (Ayberk Pekcan), Ceylan's father, was the one that secretly sent Korkut and Emine to the orphanage as Gönül Karanlı's mother saw that those two were needed to get rid of if Gönül wanted to keep her fame.

After many ups and downs, Korkut and Ceylan marry. When Ceylan learns of the bullet in his brain, she nags him to go for surgery until he agrees. Cennet and Tolga make a deal with Yilmaz to kill Korkut, as they feared losing their lavish lives to Gönül's true kids—Tolga gets a chance of heart and attempts to save Korkut, but dies from heart failure. While waiting for Korkut to revive after the successful surgery, Ceylan learns she is pregnant, but Korkut is killed by Yilmaz before he can wake up to hear the news.

Years later, Ceylan and her child, Ali Yusuf, visit Korkut's grave, where he tells his father he wants to grow up to be a great man like him. Korkut's spirit watches them.

== Cast and characters ==
Main Characters
| Actor/Actress | Character | Adapted From |
|---|---|---|
| Seçkin Özdemir | Korkut Ali (Korkut Ali Sayın after death) | Cha Moo-Hyuk |
| Damla Sönmez | Ceylan German (Ceylan Ali after marriage) | Song Eun-Chae |
| Yamaç Telli | Tolga Karanlı (Tolga Sayın after death) | Choi Yoon |
| Elçin Sangu | Eda Çağlar | Kang Min-Joo |
| Güneş Sayın | Emine Sarısoy (Emine Sayın afterwards) | Yoon Seo-Kyung |
| Zuhal Olcay | Gönül Karanlı | Oh Deul-Hee or "Audrey" |

Supporting Characters
| Actor/Actress | Character | Adapted From |
|---|---|---|
| Ayberk Pekcan | Tahsin German | Song Dae-Cheon |
| Ayşen Sezerel | Asiye German | Jang Hye-suk |
| Ahmet Uz | Memduh Sayın | Hyunseok Min |
| Haldun Resuloğlu | Hakkı Baba | Hyunseok Min |
| Deniz Denker | Cennet | N/A |
| Taha Yusuf Tan | Umut | Kim Galchi |
| Fatih Dönmez | Yılmaz | Loosely based on Jason |
| Onay Kaya | Selim German | Song Suk-Chae |
| Asena Keskinci | Ece German | Song Min-Chae |
| Ayşin Yeşim Çapanoğlu | Aslı | Mun Ji-young |
| Sema Sahingöz | Muko | N/A |
| Tarık Köksal | Ahmet | N/A |

== International broadcast ==
| Country | Local name | Network |
|---|---|---|
| Northern Cyprus | Bir Aşk Hikâyesi | FOX |
| Bulgaria | Една любовна история | BTV |
| Pakistan | ایک پیار کہانی | ATV |
| India | A Love Story | Zindagi |
| Middle East and North Africa | حكاية حب | MBC 4 |
| Ethiopia | የፍቅር ነገር | Kana TV |
| Romania | O poveste de iubire | Happy Channel |
| Vietnam | Chuyện của trái tim | VTV3 |
