= Ali Ersan Duru =

Turkish actor (born 1984)

- Born: 19 September 1984 (age 40); Ankara, Turkey
- Education: Eskişehir Osmangazi University
- Occupation: Actor
- Years active: 2010–present

Ali Ersan Duru (born 19 September 1984) is a Turkish film and television actor known for his works including Bugünün Saraylisi (2013), Diriliş: Ertuğrul (2014) and Aşk Zamanı (2015).

== Biography ==
=== Early life ===
Ali Ersan Duru was born in Ankara on 19 September 1984. His father is in the tourism business, and his mother is a housewife. He is the youngest of his four brothers and thus was the most beloved and spoiled child in the family. However, this didn't stop him from doing well at school. He also loved to participate in performances at school when he was in his teens.

He dreamed of becoming a pilot so his father sent him to the cadet corps but due to his discipline being lame, the family council made a decision that this job wasn't suitable for him.

=== Career ===
Duru started to pursue a career in acting at the age of 18. He is a graduate of Eskişehir Osmangazi University with a degree in financial studies. At the same time, he started his acting career as an amateur stage actor. He first worked at the Osmangazi University Theatre Community. In 2008, he started getting acting lessons at Diyalog Sanat. He subsequently joined the Şahika Tekand Studio and was educated in theatrical studies for three years.

Duru made his television debut with a role in TRT 1 sitcom Başrolde Aşk in 2010. In 2012, he was cast in an adaptation of Turgut Özakman's novel Diriliş. In this movie, titled Çanakkale 1915, he portrayed the character Mehmed Ali. In 2013, he had a leading role in the series Yağmurdan Kaçarken alongside Carlos Martin, Ezgi Asaroğlu, Ayça Erturan, and Furkan Andıç. He continued to appear in a number of TV series. He portrayed the role of Al-Basti(Beybolat) in last season of Diriliş: Ertuğrul. In 2019, he was cast in a recurring role in the drama series Sen Anlat Karadeniz.

He also played the main role in a TV show that was made to strengthen the Turkish-Russian ties, Kalbimin Sultanı, which received a record number of views from both countries. In the show, his co-star was the Russian actress Alexandra Nikiforova. The series was filmed in 2018.

=== Personal life ===
At the time when Şahane Damat was being filmed, he was dating his co-star Burcu Özberk (2016). Then for the following two years (2017–2018) he had a relationship with the Turkish model and actress Bestemsu Özdemir. Later he was spotted with actress Cansu Tosun but they announced that they were "just friends". Rumors of relationship with the Russian actress Alexandra Nikiforova were also denied. Ali Ersan Duru is currently single.

== Filmography ==
=== Film ===
Film
Year	Title	Role	Notes
2012	Çanakkale 1915	Mehmet Ali	
2013	Romantik Komedi 2: Bekarlığa Veda	Mustafa	Supporting role

=== Television ===
Television
Year	Title	Role	Notes
2010	Lale Devri		Guest appearance
2011	Başrolde Aşk		Supporting role
2011	Hayat Devam Ediyor	Berat Altındağ	Supporting role
2013	Yağmurdan Kaçarken	Korkmaz	Supporting role
2013	Bugünün Saraylısı	Fatih Soysal	Leading role
2014	Gönül İşleri		Leading role
2015	Aşk Zamanı	Fikret	Leading role
2016	Şahane Damat	Mehmet Çırağan	Leading role
2018	Kalbimin Sultanı	Mahmud II	Leading role
2019	Diriliş: Ertuğrul	Albastı (Beybolat)	(season 5)
2019	Sen Anlat Karadeniz	Ferhat	Leading role
2020	Sen Çal Kapımı	Efe Akman	Supporting role
2023	Kudüs Fatihi Selahaddin Eyyubi	Turan-Shah	
