= Haluk Bilginer =

Turkish actor

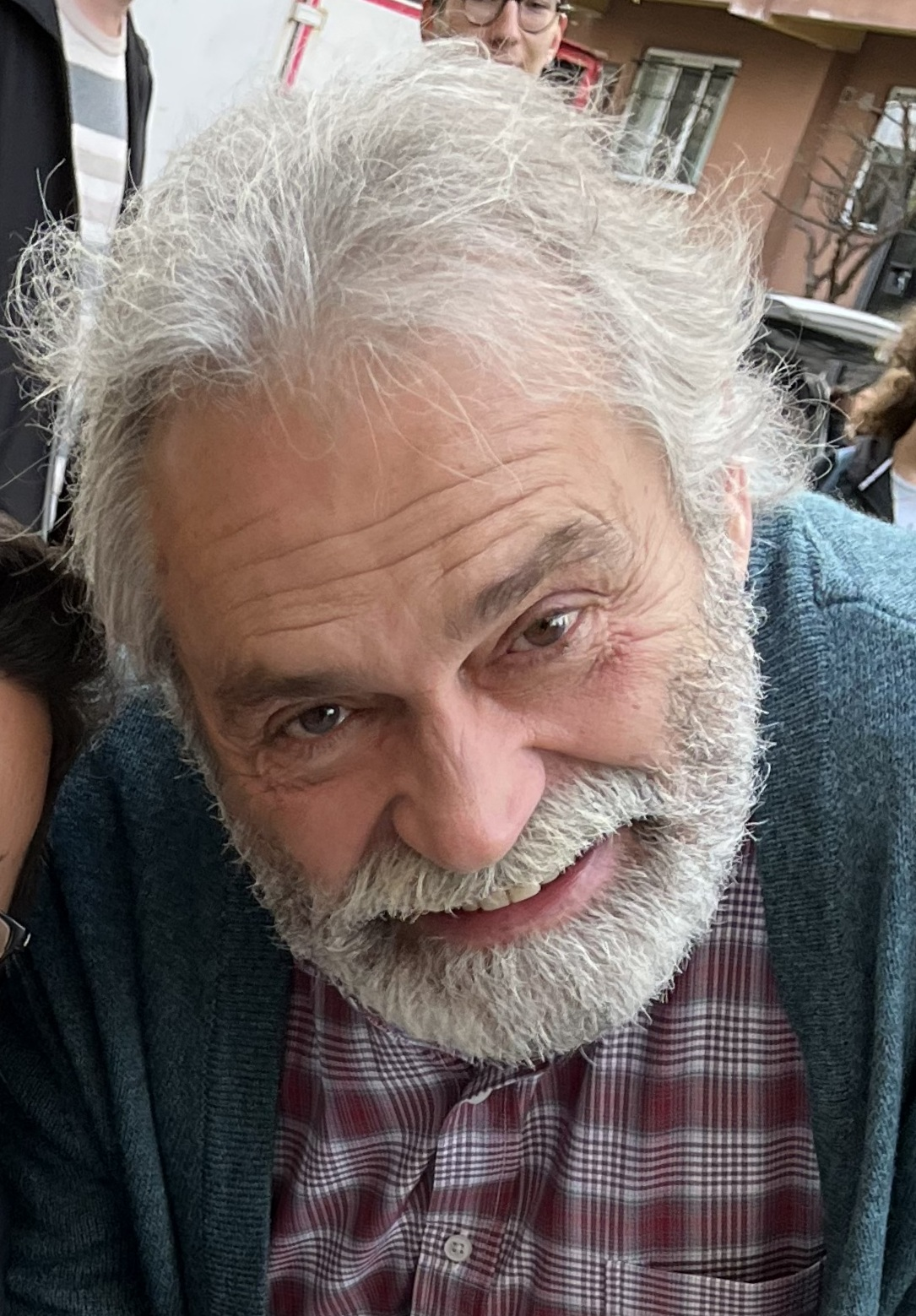
- Bilginer in 2022
- Born: 5 June 1954 (age 72); İzmir, Turkey
- Education: London Academy of Music and Dramatic Art
- Occupation: Actor
- Years active: 1978–present
- Spouse(s): Zuhal Olcay (m. 1992; div. 2004) Aşkın Nur Yengi (m. 2006; div. 2012)
- Children: 1

Nihat Haluk Bilginer (Turkish pronunciation: [haˈluk bilɟiˈneɾ]; born 5 June 1954) is a Turkish actor. For his role in Şahsiyet (2018), Bilginer won the Best Actor award at the 47th International Emmy Awards. His movie Kış Uykusu won the Palme d'Or at the Cannes Film Festival. In addition to his acting career in Turkey, he has also worked in the United Kingdom and remains best known there for his role as Mehmet Osman in the television soap opera EastEnders during the 1980s. He has also starred in Hollywood movies as a character actor, including The International (2009), W.E. (2011), Ben-Hur (2016), Halloween (2018) and Maria (2024). He often plays villains and unsympathetic characters.

== Early life and education ==
Nihat Haluk Bilginer was born on 5 June 1954 in İzmir, Turkey.

He graduated from the Ankara State Conservatory in 1977 before going to London, England, where he graduated from the London Academy of Music and Dramatic Art.

== Career ==
=== EastEnders (1985–1989) ===
Bilginer landed his first role in the long-running British soap opera EastEnders. He made his first appearance in EastEnders as Mehmet Osman on-screen in June 1985, four months after the show premiered. His arrival coincides with a cot death storyline of Sue and Ali's baby, Hassan. Mehmet appears as a recurring character from 1985 to 1987, setting up a cab firm named Ozcabs from inside Ali's café; however, he becomes a regular in 1988, when both he and his wife Guizin (Ishia Bennison) are made partners in Ali's café, which is renamed Café Osman.

Described as "the Terrible Turk", Bilginer was one of the more popular male cast members on EastEnders during the 1980s, and he reportedly received sackfuls of fan mail, "despite playing a villain and a womanising snake". Hilary Kingsley, author of The EastEncers Handbook said that what made the character so popular was Bilginer's Omar Sharif-style good looks and charm. Following the departure of Holland and Smith, Mehmet was eventually written out of the serial in May 1989, in a storyline that signified the disbandment of the Osman family. On-screen, Mehmet returns to his native Cyprus after a fight with Guizin regarding her suspicions about Mehmet's fabricated affair with Sue. The Osman family were among many characters to leave the serial that year.

During the course of the show, he went to Turkey to star in the 1987 miniseries Gecenin Öteki Yüzü based from novel and mini history series Ateşten Günler based on the novel and the 1995 comedy series "Medeni Haller", where he met his eventual first wife Zuhal Olcay, famous Turkish actress and singer. After dividing his time between London and Istanbul for six years, he left the show to stay in Turkey permanently and married Olcay in 1992.

=== 1990s ===
Bilginer starred in Ken Hill's popular musical theatre adaptation of the Guy de Maupassant novel The Wicked World of Bel-Ami at the Theatre Royal Stratford East, working with Fiona Hendley, Toni Palmer, Peter Staker, and Colin Atkins.

He guest-starred in an episode of Young Indiana Jones as İsmet İnönü, and went on to star in the Yavuz Özkan film "İki Kadın". He then starred in various movies, including İstanbul Kanatlarımın Altında and the famous Usta Beni Öldürsene. After critical acclaim for these roles, he earned his first award as a supporting actor in Masumiyet.

He had a role in the series "Gülşen Abi". After deciding he wanted to pursue career on stage, he founded "Tiyatro Stüdyosu" (Theatre Studio) with his wife Zuhal Olcay and Ahmet Levendoğlu in 1990. After starring in various plays for six years, he returned to the screen in 1996 after a fire that destroyed the theatre. He and his wife starred in television and movies to raise money to found another theatre.

He starred in Eyvah Kızım Büyüdü, starting his second era in television. After years of work, he and his wife managed to start a second theatre, called "Oyun Atölyesi" (Play Workshop).

=== 2000s ===
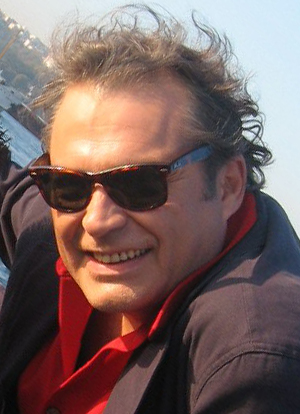
Haluk Bilginer in 2005

In 2001, he landed a role in Tatlı Hayat, a remake of The Jeffersons. He played the role of İhsan Yıldırım, an angry and foul-mouthed, yet lovable dry cleaner. He was accompanied by the actress Türkan Şoray, who has starred in the most feature films for a female actress worldwide, with 222 films to her name in the Guinness Book of Records.

He divorced Zuhal Olcay in 2004 and began a relationship with Aşkın Nur Yengi, a famous Turkish singer. They married in 2006 and had a daughter.

After Tatlı Hayat, he starred in films Neredesin Firuze, "Hırsız Var", "Hacivat Karagöz Neden Öldürüldü?", "7 Kocalı Hürmüz" and "Güneşin Oğlu". His portrayal of the troubled police legend Musa Rami in the film Polis became his most critically acclaimed role after Tatlı Hayat.

Bilginer played the role of Mustafa Kemal Atatürk in an İş Bank commercial, which first aired on 10 November 2007 during the 69th commemorations of Atatürk's death.

He played in the rom-com series "Sevgili Dünürüm" alongside Nevra Serezli, Sumru Yavrucuk, Engin Altan Düzyatan, Rojda Demirer, Didem Balçın, and Cengiz Bozkurt.

Bilginer co-starred in the 2009 American thriller The International as Ahmet Sunay, a Turkish high-tech missile guidance system dealer, alongside Clive Owen and Naomi Watts.

He joined in the second season of the hit series Ezel. With Ezel's co-star Cansu Dere, he starred in the series Şahsiyet, playing a retired court clerk who is diagnosed with Alzheimer's disease. The latter role won him an International Emmy Award for Best Actor. He worked again with same director and screenwriter duo Onur Saylak and Hakan Günday in the Netflix series "Uysallar".

Bilginer played an actor who acts as a woman in the series Hayatımın Rolü, an adaptation of Mrs. Doubtfire. He played Aydın in Kış Uykusu (Winter Sleep), which won the Palme d'Or at the Cannes Film Festival in 2014. He worked with Ali Atay on the series "Masum" and "Şeref Bey" for many times, and appeared in the Netflix series "Sıcak Kafa", based on a science fiction novel.

In 2016, he appeared in "Ben-Hur". In 2018, Bilginer played Dr. Ranbir Sartain, the new psychiatrist of Michael Myers, in the slasher sequel Halloween.

In 2020, he played the lead villain Dr. Grief in the first season of the hit Prime Video series Alex Rider, based on the bestselling novels by Anthony Horowitz. In 2023, Bilginer starred as Barbara Nadel's fictional Istanbul detective Çetin İkmen in the Paramount+ series The Turkish Detective.

== Personal life ==
In 1987, Bilginer traveled to İstanbul to film the TV series Gecenin Öteki Yüzü (The Other Side of the Night), where he met actress/singer Zuhal Olcay; they married in 1992 and divorced in 2004. He married singer Aşkın Nur Yengi in 2006 and has a daughter from this marriage; they divorced in 2012.

== Filmography ==
=== International ===
==== Films ====
Year	Title	Role	Notes
1986	Half Moon Street	First Arab	British-American production
1987	Ishtar	Guerrilla leader	American production
1987	Lionheart	Merchant	Hungarian-American production
1997	Sawdust Tales	Aaron	
1999	Harem Suare		
2001	Buffalo Soldiers	The Turk	American production
2003	Hittites	King III. Hattuþili	Turkish production docudrama film
2004	She's Gone	Inspector Yilmaz	British production
2009	The Watercolor		Turkish production
2009	The International	Ahmet Sunay	American-German production
2011	W.E.	Mohamed Al-Fayed	British-American production
2012	The Reluctant Fundamentalist	Nazmi Kemal	American-Indian-Qatari production
2014	Rosewater	Baba Akbar	
2014	Winter Sleep	Aydın	Best Actor – won FIPRESCI Prize at Palm Springs International Film Festival the film won the Palme d'Or and the FIPRESCI Prize
2016	Ben-Hur	Simonides	
2017	Forget About Nick	Nick	
2017	The Ottoman Lieutenant	Halil Bey	
2017	Trendy	Hasan	
2017	Refuge	Ahmet	
2018	Halloween	Dr. Ranbir Sartain	
2019	Noah Land	Ibrahim	
2020	Leyla Everlasting	Adem	
2021	Stuck Apart	Erbil	
2024	Maria	Aristotle Onassis	American-Italian-German production

=== Turkish ===
==== Web series ====
Year	Title	Role	Notes
2017	Masum	Cevdet	Leading role
2018	Şahsiyet	Agâh Beyoglu	Winner – Best Performance by an Actor at the 47th International Emmy Awards
2021	Şeref Bey	Şeref	Leading role
2022	Uysallar	Berhudar	Leading role
2022	Sıcak Kafa	Haluk	Leading role

==== TV series ====
Year	Title	Role	Notes
1987	Gecenin Öteki Yüzü	Ali	mini series
1987	Ateşten Günler	Ahmet Rıfkı	mini series
1991	Safiye'dir Kızın Adı		
1992	Borsa	Reha Çalık	
1993	Son Söz Sevginin	Tahsin	
1994-1996	Gülşen Abi	Abidin Özbidin	
1997	Medeni Haller		
1998-2000	Eyvah Babam	Sedat	
2000-2001	Eyvah Kızım Büyüdü	Sedat	Sequel series
2001	Cesur Kuşku		
2001	Karanlıkta Koşanlar	Ali	mini series
2001	Dadı	Himself/Guest	a remake of The Nanny
2001-2004	Tatlı Hayat	Ihsan Yıldırım	a remake of The Jeffersons
2002	Ti Show	Robot Memduh	
2004–2005	Sayın Bakanım	Samim Bayraktar	a remake of British TV series Yes Minister
2005	Yine de Aşığım	Ali	
2007-2008	Sevgili Dünürüm	Ahmet	
2008	Nerede Kalmıştık	Ateş	
2009	Sıkı Dostlar	Hikmet	a remake of The Odd Couple
2010	Cuma'ya Kalsa	Cuma	
2010	Üvey İkizler		
2010–2011	Ezel	Kenan Birkan	
2011	İstanbul'un Altınları	Reşat Altın	
2012	Acayip Hikayeler	Sinan	
2012	Hayatımın Rolü	Müşfik/Nanny	a remake of Mrs. Doubtfire
2014	Kaçak	Ustura Faysal	
2017	Kara Yazı	Oğuz	
2022	Baba	Emin Saruhanlı	Leading role

==== Films ====
Year	Title	Role	Notes
1990	Ölürayak	Ömer	
1991	Kara Sevdalı Bulut	Atila	
1992	İki Kadın	Metin	
1996	İstanbul Kanatlarımın Altında	Evliya Celebi	
1996	80.Adım	Savcı	
1997	Nihavend Mucize	Erol	
1997	Masumiyet	Bekir	Best Supporting Actor – won Golden Orange at International Antalya Film Festival; Won Jean Carment Award at Angers European First Film Festival
1999	Güle Güle		
2000	Fasulye	The imaginary old man	
2001	Filler ve Çimenler		
2004	Neredesin Firuze	Hayri	
2005	Hırsız Var		
2006	Kısık Ateşte 15 Dakika	Muhtar	
2006	Polis	Musa Rami	
2006	Hacivat Karagöz Neden Öldürüldü?		
2008	Devrim Arabaları		
2008	Güneşin Oğlu		
2009	7 Kocalı Hürmüz	Cebrail	
2010	New York'ta Beş Minare	Hacı	
2012	Çanakkale Çocukları	Kasım	
2014	Kış Uykusu	Aydın	Best Actor – won FIPRESCI Prize at Palm Springs International Film Festival the film won the Palme d'Or and the FIPRESCI Prize
2017	Geceyarısı, Türkiye Zamanı	The President	
2017	Kırık Kalpler Bankası	Yusuf Yağmur	
2017	Cingöz Recai: Bir Efsanenin Dönüşü	Mehmet Rıza	
2019	Nuh Tepesi	İbrahim	
2020	9 Kere Leyla	Adem	
2021	Azizler	Erbil	
2025	Yan Yana	Refik	

== Awards ==
- 47th International Emmy Awards, (2019)
