= Gözde Kansu =

Turkish actress (born 1980)

- Born: 23 August 1980 (age 45); İzmir, Turkey
- Occupation: Actress
- Years active: 1995–present

Gözde Kansu (born 23 August 1980) is a Turkish actress.

== Life and career ==
Kansu studied at İzmir Tevfik Fikret High School. She is a graduate of Dokuz Eylül University School of Fine Arts with a degree in theatre studies.

She first started learning ballet and later got involved in theatre and music projects at her school. She then worked for the Istanbul City Theatres and was invited to join them on stage during a tour of Antalya.

She was cast in adaptations of Turkish classic novels Dudaktan Kalbe, Hanımın Çiftliği, Al Yazmalım. In the beginning of her career, she had guest roles in many hit series "Ayrılsak da Beraberiz", "En Son Babalar Duyar", "Kurşun Yarası, "Çiçek Taksi". She was cast in hit films "Issız Adam", "Abuzer Kadayıf".

== Filmography ==
Year	Title	Role	Notes
1995	Çiçek Taksi		TV series
1999–2003	Ayrılsak da Beraberiz	Teacher	TV series
2000	Abuzer Kadayıf	Girl in the club	Film
2000	Üzgünüm Leyla		TV series
2002	En Son Babalar Duyar	Defne's friend	TV series
2002	Yeter Anne	Deniz	TV series
2003	Kurşun Yarası	Nefise	TV series
2004	Mürüvvetsiz Mürüvvet		Film
2004	Canım Benim		TV series
2005	Kısmet	Ebru	TV series
2005	Haylaz Babam	Secretary Yasemin	TV series
2006	Cemile	Elvan	TV series
2007–2008	Dudaktan Kalbe	Nimet Başar Altuğ	TV series
2008	Issız Adam	Sinem	Film
2009	Aşk Üçgeni	Zeynep/Tuana	Film
2009	Bahar Dalları	Emine	TV series
2009	Neşeli Hayat		Film
2010	Hanımın Çiftliği	Seher	TV series
2011	Al Yazmalim	Helin Sezaioğlu	TV series
2011	Cast-ı Olanmı Var		Short film
2013	Kutsal Bir Gün	Burcu	Film
2014	Ankara'nın Dikmeni	Tilbe	TV series
2015	Geçmiş	Esin	Film
2015	Medcezir	Olcay	TV series
2016–2017	İçerde	Yeşim Duman	TV series
2018	Sen Anlat Karadeniz	Eyșan Sayar	TV series
2019–2020	Kuaförüm Sensin	Presenter	TV program
2022–2025	Yalı Çapkını	Gülgün Korhan	TV series
2024	Zeytin Ağacı	Aysel	Streaming series
2026	Başıbozuklar	Nevra	Film
2026–	Çirkin	Hande Görgün	TV series
