= Alican Yücesoy =

Turkish actor

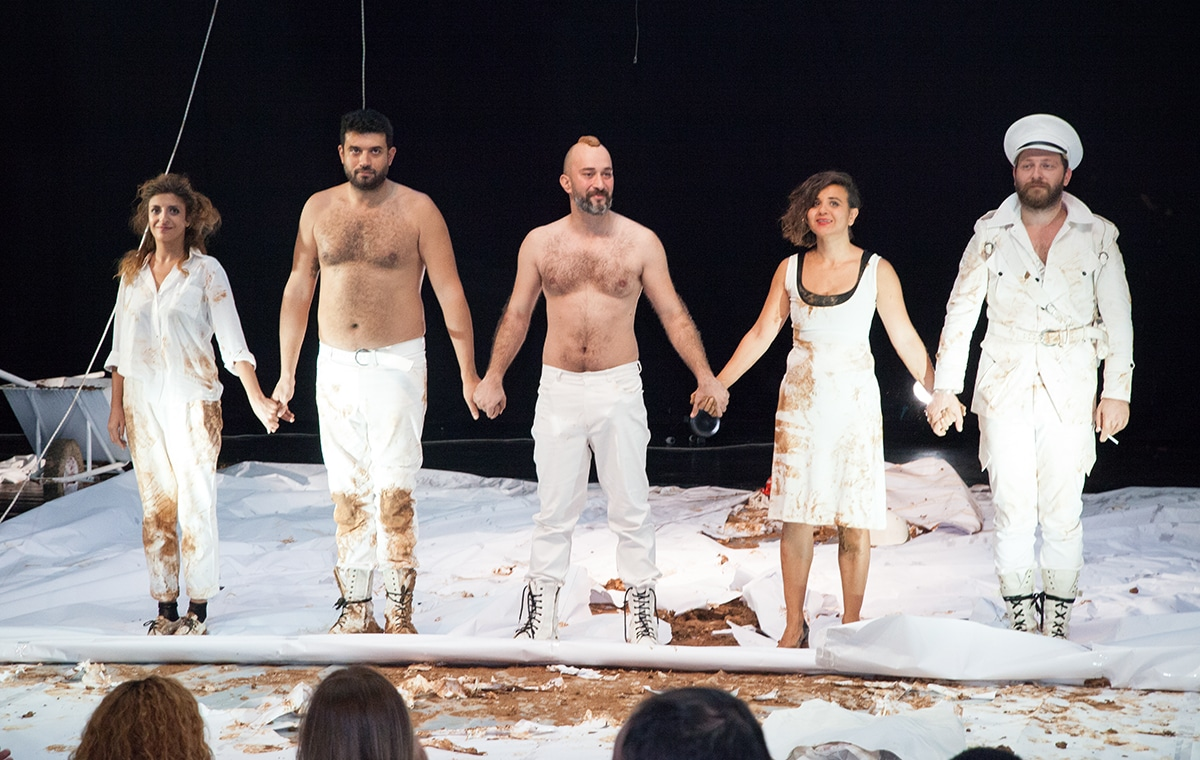
- Alican Yücesoy, Doğacan Taşpınar, Erol Ozan Ayhan, Elif Ürse and Yelda Baskın (right to left), 2017
- Born: 22 October 1982 (age 43); Istanbul, Turkey
- Occupation: Actor
- Years active: 2003–present
- Spouse: Melisa Sözen (m. 2013; div. 2014)

Alican Yücesoy (born 22 October 1982) is a Turkish actor, screenwriter and director. He is best known for films and theatre plays. In his television career, he is best known for the surreal series Şubat, drama series "Kördüğüm", İntikam, the Turkish remake of "Revenge", and the medical series "Sen de Gitme". He played supporting roles in popular series "Suskunlar", "Adanalı", "Yargı", "Zoraki Koca". He gained international recognition with his role in the Japanese-Turkish co-production 125 Years Memory. He portrayed Mustafa Kemal Atatürk in films "Zübeyde Analar ve Oğullar" and "Son Osmanlı Yandım Ali" for twice.

== Early life ==
His maternal family is of Turkish descent; those family members originally immigrated from Bartın and Ruse, where the Turk minority in Bulgaria lives. His paternal family is of Arab and Turkish descent from Antep and Urfa.

After completing his primary, secondary and high school education in Bursa, Yücesoy enrolled in Haliç University Theatre Department for acting education. He started to work at Bakırköy Municipality Theatre after he participated in an audition the day after he entered the school. He later started appearing in TV series and movies. As of 2015, he is the new general art director of Bakırköy Municipality Theatre.

He married Melisa Sözen who was his co-star in Şubat. In 2014, they divorced.

== Theatre ==
- He-Go: Halil Babür – Altıdan Sonra Theatre – 2017
- Gülünç Karanlık: Wolfram Lotz – Bakırköy Municipality Theatres – 2016
- Hayvan Çiftliği: George Orwell – Bakırköy Municipality Theatres – 2014
- Sıkı Yönetim: Albert Camus – Bakırköy Municipality Theatres – 2012
- Eksik: Özer Aslan – Tiyatro Hal – 2012
- Külhanbeyi Müzikali: Ülkü Ayvaz – Bakırköy Municipality Theatres – 2011
- Aklı Havada: Ali Yenel – Bakırköy Municipality Theatres – 2010
- Yağmurcu: N. Richard Nash – Bakırköy Municipality Theatres – 2008
- Tersine Dünya: Orhan Kemal – Bakırköy Municipality Theatres – 2007
- Dua Odası: Shan Khan – Tiyatro Z – 2006
- Pırtlatan Bal: Aziz Nesin – Bakırköy Municipality Theatres – 2005
- Günün Adamı: Haldun Taner – Bakırköy Municipality Theatres – 2005
- Teneke: Yaşar Kemal – Bakırköy Municipality Theatres – 2004
- Klakson, Borazanlar ve Bırtlar: Dari Fo – Bakırköy Municipality Theatres – 2004
- Köpek Kadın Erkek: Sibylle Berg – 2004
- Suret: Onur Bayraktar – Stüdyo Drama – 2004

== Filmography ==
=== As director and screenwriter ===
- Taş (short film)

=== As actor ===
==== Series ====
Web series
Year	Title	Role
2024	Arjen	
2022	Ben Gri	
2022	Sizi Dinliyorum	Ferit
2022	Aslında Özgürsün	
2021	Hükümsüz	Serdar
2020	Bir Başkadır	Sinan
2020	Jet Sosyete	guest/Ahmet
TV series
Year	Title	Role
2024	Yargı	Fırat
2022	Hayatımın Şansı	
2020	Menajerimi Ara	guest/himself
2018	Can Kırıkları	Cihan Karadağ
2018	Adı: Zehra	Serkan Kurdoğlu
2016	Kördüğüm	Umut
2015	Serçe Sarayı	Ali Rıza öğretmen
2014	Bana Artık Hicran De	
2013–2014	İntikam	Ali Sülen
2012–2013	Şubat	Şubat
2012	Suskunlar	Cebrail
2011—2012	Sen De Gitme	İlker
2008–2010	Adanalı	Tilki Timur
2007	Zoraki Koca	Tarık
2007	Gurbet Yolcuları	Hüseyin
2003	Sessiz Gece	Işık
2003	Pilli Bebek	Ertuğrul

==== Film ====
Year	Title	Role
2024	Bildiğin Gibi Değil	
2023	Zübeyde Analar ve Oğullar	Mustafa Kemal Atatürk
2022	Yılbaşı Gecesi	(Alican)
2022	Bandırma Füze Kulübü	
2021	Kimya	
2021	Cemil Show	
2020	9 Kere Leyla	(Haris)
2019	Küçük Şeyler	
2018	Lojman	
2017	Sofra Sırları	
2017	Aşk Uykusu	(Serkan)
2016	Çok Uzak Fazla Yakın	
2015	125 Years Memory	(Bekir)
2011	Uzun Bir Gün	
2011	Eyvah Eyvah 2	(İbrahim)
2010	Prensesin Uykusu	(Neşet)
2010	Eyvah Eyvah	(İbrahim)
2009	Ev	
2008	Dinle Neyden	(Halil Tabip)
2007	Umut Adası	(Tuğra)
2006	Son Osmanlı Yandım Ali	Mustafa Kemal Atatürk
2004	2 Eylül	(Tim Çavuşu)
2004	Akümülatörlü Radyo	(Murat)

==== Short film ====
- The Flag
- Cemil Show

=== TV programs ===
- 2022 Maske Kimsin Sen? (Judge)

== Awards ==
- İstanbul Film Festival - Best Actor Awards (2024) (Bilindiği Gibi Değil)
- 26th International Adana Golden Boll Film Festival – Best Actor Awards (2019) (Küçük Şeyler)
- 56th Antalya Golden Orange Film Festival – Best Actor Awards (2019)
- The 33rd Montenegro Film Festival Golden Mimosa for Best Actor – La Belle Indifference
- 9th Malatya International Film Festival – Best Actor Award
- 7th Kayseri Film Festival – Best Actor Award (Küçük Şeyler)
