= Ezel Akay =

Turkish actor, director and producer (born 1961)

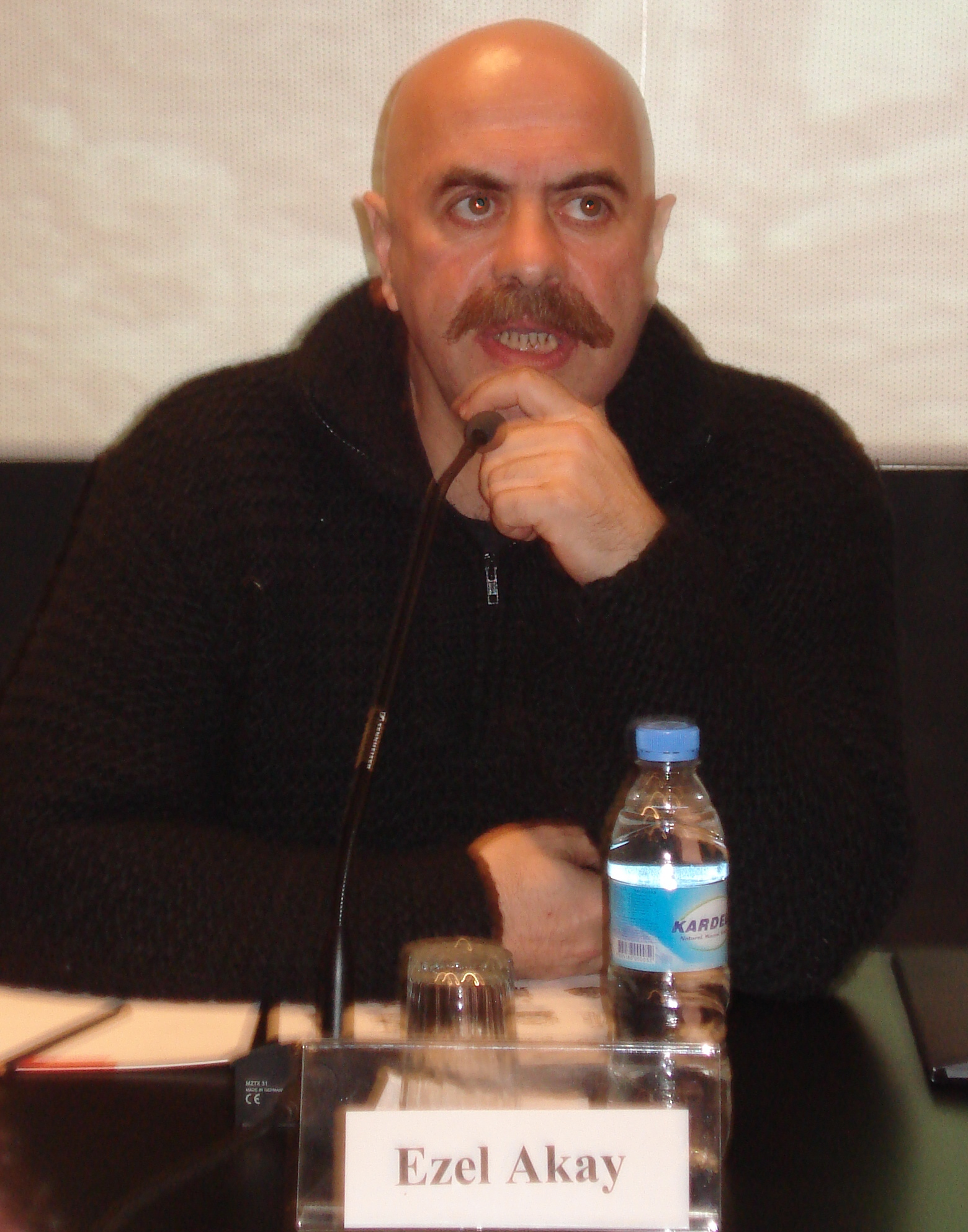
- Born: 20 January 1961 (age 65); İnegöl, Bursa, Turkey
- Occupations: Actor; director; producer
- Years active: 1996–present
- Spouse: Şebnem Dönmez (m. 2004; div. 2007)
- Children: 1 (b. 1998)

Ezel Akay (born 20 January 1961) is a Turkish actor, director, writer and producer.

== Life and career ==
After Ezel Akay graduated as a mechanical engineer from the Boğaziçi University, he was trained as actor at the US-American Villanova University.

Before Ezel Akay started to work in the Turkish film business and co-founded the Turkish production company IFR, he worked as copywriter, theatre director and –actor. Since the foundation of his film production company IFR, Ezel Akay directed more than 1200 commercials.

In 1996 Ezel Akay produced, together with the Turkish film director Dervis Zaim, Zaim's debut feature Somersault in a Coffin, which won several national and international prizes. Where's Firuze? was the first feature, which Ezel Akay directed.

== Filmography ==
- 1996: Somersault in a Coffin (Tabutta Rövaşata) (producer)
- 1999: Journey to the Sun (Güneşe Yolculuk) (executive producer)
- 2001: Elephants and Grass (Filler ve Çimen) (actor)
- 2001: The Waterfall (producer, actor)
- 2004: Where's Firuze? (Neredesin Firuze), (director, producer, actor)
- 2005: Making Boats out of Watermellon Rinds (Karpuz Kabuğundan Gemiler Yapmak) (producer)
- 2005: Robbery Alla Turca (Hırsız Var!), (actor)
- 2006: Killing the Shadows (Hacivat Karagöz Neden Öldürüldü?), (director, producer, writer, and actor)
- 2006: The Road Home (Eve Giden Yol) (actor)
- 2007: Adam and the Devil (Adem'in Trenleri) (producer, actor)
- 2007: Sözün Bittiği Yer (actor)
- 2007: Hicran Sokağı (actor)
- 2009: 7 Husbands for Hürmüz (7 Kocalı Hürmüz), (director, actor)
- 2011: Gümüş Lale Burası Osmanlı 1711 (director, scriptwriter)
- 2013: F Type Film - 9 jail stories, (co-director, actor - episode 2)
- 2014: Küçük Kara Balıklar (director)
- 2017: Martıların Efendisi (actor)
- 2020: Leyla Everlasting (9 Kere Leyla), (director, producer, scriptwriter)
- 2020: Yarım Kalan Aşklar (actor)
- 2022: Osman 8 (director)
- 2023: Altay (Showrunner/director)
- 2024: Çatal Sofrası/Fork Table (Cooking show Presenter/Chef)
