= Yaprak Dökümü (TV series) =

- Genre: Drama
- Based on: Yaprak Dökümü by Reşat Nuri Güntekin
- Written by: Ece Yörenç; Melek Gençoğlu
- Directed by: Mesude Erarslan Tekin
- Starring: Halil Ergün; Güven Hokna; Deniz Çakır; Bennu Yıldırımlar; Gökçe Bahadır; Fahriye Evcen; Neslihan Atagül; Seda Demir
- Narrated by: Bennu Yıldırımlar
- Theme music composer: Toygar Işıklı
- Opening theme: Bana Herşey Uzak (Everything away from me)
- Ending theme: Yaprak Dökümü (Leaf cast)
- Country of origin: Turkey
- Original language: Turkish
- No. of seasons: 5
- No. of episodes: 174

Production
- Production locations: Istanbul; Trabzon; Adapazarı; Afyonkarahisar; Milan, Italy
- Camera setup: Multi-camera
- Running time: 80–90 minutes per episode
- Production company: Ay Yapım

Original release
- Network: Kanal D
- Release: September 13, 2006 – December 29, 2010

Yaprak Dökümü (The Fall of Leaves) is a Turkish television series. It is the adaptation of the 1930 novel of the same name by Reşat Nuri Güntekin. The series aired on Kanal D from September 13, 2006, to December 29, 2010, lasting 5 seasons and comprising 174 episodes. The show is set in Istanbul, Turkey, and it revolves around the fictional family Tekin, and how when they come to Istanbul that tears their family apart, and transforms them in a way they cannot imagine.

== Premise ==
The series revolves around the fictional family Tekin as they move from Trabzon to Istanbul so that one of their daughters, Necla, can attend college. The family patriarch Ali Riza raises his children in harmony, teaching them on moral values and justice, missing to prepare them for the real cruelty of life.

The family consists of Ali Riza's wife Hayriye Tekin and their five children: Fikret, the oldest daughter, their only son Şevket, young daughters Leyla and Necla and their little daughter Ayşe. Other characters include their loyal neighbors, widow Neyir and her young daughter Sedef. Şevket's spouse Ferhunde and schemer Oğuz serve as the main antagonists.

The show's title refers to the fact that upon the arrival of Ali Riza's family in the big city, his family begins to fall apart, symbolic to the autumn's fall of the leaves.

== Series overview ==
Season	Episodes	Originally released	
Season	Episodes	First released	Last released
1	38	September 13, 2006	June 20, 2007
2	42	September 5, 2007	June 25, 2008
3	38	September 3, 2008	June 17, 2009
4	41	September 2, 2009	June 16, 2010
5	15	September 15, 2010	December 29, 2010

== Cast ==
- Halil Ergün as Ali Rıza Tekin
- Güven Hokna as Hayriye Tekin
- Bennu Yıldırımlar as Fikret Tekin
- Caner Kurtaran, later Hasan Küçükçetin as Şevket Tekin
- Gökçe Bahadır as Leyla Tekin
- Fahriye Evcen as Necla Tekin
- Efsun Karaali, later Şebnem Ceceli as Ayşe Tekin
- Deniz Çakır as Ferhunde Güven
- Tolga Karel as Oğuz Ayhan
- Bedia Ener as Neyir Genç
- Güler Ökten as Cevriye Başsoy
- Ahmet Saraçoğlu as Tahsin Başsoy
- Perihan Savaş as Nurdan Güven
- Mustafa Avkıran as Mithat Kara
- Seda Demir as Sedef Turan
- Ege Aydan as Can Türe
- Türkan Kılıç as Oya Türe
- Kıvanç Kasabalı as Cem Aydınoğlu
- Barış Bağcı as Ali Sarper
- Nihat Alptuğ Altınkaya as Levent Tuncel
- Yusuf Atala as Ahmet Genç
- Başak Sayan as Ceyda
- Bülent Fil as Yaman
- Nezih Tuncay as Kemal Aydınoğlu
- Sedef Avcı as Selin Aydınoğlu
- Selma Özkanlı as Suzan Aydınoğlu
- Melina Özprodomos as Ufuk
- Engin Hepileri as Emir
- Caner Cindoruk as Nazmi
- Uğur Kıvılcım as Nurinisa
- Eren Balkan as Gülşen
- Gülşah Ertuğrul as Reyhan
- Burcu Günay as Asli
- Arda Esen as Serdar
- Necip Memili as Erkan
- Ayberk Pekcan as Talat
- Burak Davutoğlu as İsmail, who likes Ferhunde
- Mehmet Güler as Seyfi
- Neslihan Atagül as Deniz Başsoy
- Berk Boğaç Akgüneş as Mehmet Başsoy
- Mustafa Orbay Avcı as Caner Başsoy

== Synopsis ==
=== Season 1 ===
The first scene shows the Tekins on a train to Istanbul. Fikret is the narrator of the story. She explains that Ali Riza was the mayor of Trabzon. She was engaged to a man who worked for Ali Riza, but was later framed for embezzlement. Ali Riza could not tolerate the scandal and asked for retirement. He demanded Fikret to end the engagement and she did. Necla passed the entrance exam of a university in Istanbul. Ali Riza decided to move the family there to facilitate Necla's life. Upon their arrival, the Tekins move to an old mansion which Ali Riza has inherited from his parents, and they quickly adapt to Istanbul. They soon befriend Neyir and Sedef. Sedef falls in love with Şevket, but he treats her as his sister. Ali Riza starts working in a company and meets Oğuz (Oğuz), and from that point he hates Oğuz's personality. Oğuz leaves the company and works for a rich man named Yaman. Şevket starts working in a bank, meets Ferhunde at work and dates her. Necla starts seeing Oğuz secretly, while he's already involved with Yaman's wife, Ceyda. Ali Riza resigns due to an honor issue with the boss. Leyla begins her pre-college courses. She meets a guy who persuades her to get on a motor-bike with him. Whilst driving, they accidentally run over an old man; Leyla tries to help him get to the hospital but the guy forces her to get back on the motor bike and they flee the scene. The old man dies and the story gets revealed. Ali Riza stops Leyla from going to the courses but eventually allows her to go again. Şevket finds out that Ferhunde is married and ends the affair, but she seduces him again. She divorces her husband to marry Şevket. Ali Riza does not approve of the marriage but allows it to go on after Şevket threatens to kill himself. They decide to live in the mansion until Şevket can buy a house. Sedef attempts suicide; But Ali Riza saves her. Necla suspects Oğuz and ends the relationship. Ferhunde resigns with an excuse to have some rest, leaving Şevket the only person to pay the Tekins' expenses. She starts lavishing and making instability at home while gaining Necla and Leyla's trust. Leyla starts dating Oğuz secretly. Fehunde takes Necla in her car to see Leyla and Oğuz, thus starting the friction between the two sisters. Necla gets angry first but later reconciles with Leyla. Ferhunde ruins Fikret's birthday, angering Şevket to the point that he expels Ferhunde. She pretends that she's pregnant, causing Şevket and Ali Riza to ask her to return. Nurdan, Ferhunde's mother leaves jail and meets the Tekins and reveals that she committed murder. Hayriye gets curious and finds out that the victim was her husband. Ferhunde gets angry and reveals that her stepfather was trying to rape her and Nurdan killed him in Ferhunde's defense. Ferhunde also reveals that she's not pregnant and she lied in order to have a family. Leyla ends her relationship with Oğuz, but finds out that she's pregnant. She goes to his apartment to tell him, but sees Ceyda with him. Leyla gets angry and falls from the stairs, causing her baby to abort. The Tekins find out. Leyla tells Ferhunde about Oğuz and Ceyda. Ferhunde threatens Oğuz into marrying Leyla, otherwise she'll tell Yaman about the affair. Ali Riza accepts the marriage, but stops talking to Leyla. Ferhunde starts blackmailing Oğuz secretly. She also shows displeasure towards Sedef and Neyir after finding out about Sedef's love for Şevket. Ali Riza reconciles with Leyla and allows Oğuz in his house only for her good. Necla befriends Cem in the college. He's rich and handsome and aligns with Ali Riza's moral values; so he accepts Cem's request for a more serious relationship with Necla. Ceyda's pregnant from Oğuz, but Yaman believes the baby is his. Fikret calls him from a phone booth and tells him that it is not, causing Yaman to investigate Ceyda and later Oğuz, but he makes Yaman trust him again to the point that he stops paying Ferhunde. She tells Yaman that Oğuz may have been stealing from him, considering Oğuz got rich so fast, prompting Yaman to investigate Oğuz's records. Necla and Cem get engaged, but Oğuz seduces her and they plan to escape to Germany. Hayriye, Fikret and Ferhunde find out about Necla and Oğuz. Fikret tries to tell Ali Riza, but Hayriye stops her. Fikret meets Tahsin, a relative of Neyir, who lost his wife recently and lives with his mother and children in Adapazarı. Fikret decides to marry him only to get rid of her family, stating that she hates all of them. Necla and Oğuz escape and the Tekins suffer through grief. Leyla gets mentally ill. Yaman finds out about Oğuz's theft and his affair. Oğuz is arrested in the airport as he and Necla try to leave.

=== Season 2 ===
Oğuz leaves custody and waits for trial. He and Necla buy a small apartment. Fikret leaves for Adapazarı without saying goodbye. Ali Riza removes all signs of Necla from his house and forbids naming her. He hires Yaman's lawyer Can for Leyla's divorce. Fikret arrives in Tahsin's house, but his mother and daughter show displeasure upon Fikret. Leyla confronts Necla and Oğuz and reveals Oğuz and Ceyda's affair to Necla. Oğuz believes Ferhunde sent Leyla and takes his revenge by sending Şevket the paper of all the money transfer to Ferhunde. Yaman divorces Ceyda. She has nowhere to go and Oğuz brings her to his house, angering Necla to the point of leaving. She goes to a pension where the landlady plans to lead her into prostitution. Şevket has problems paying the family's expenses. Oğuz goes to jail. Ceyda attempts suicide, but Necla stops her. Leyla recovers from her disease by the help of Can's psychologist wife. Tahsin's daughter reconciles with Fikret. She comes to Istanbul and reconciles with the Tekins who have been missing her so much. Ali Riza realizes that Tahsin is a good man and Fikret is happy. Later she and Tahsin fall in love. Necla starts working at a bar while continuing her studies. She writes a letter to Ali Riza expressing her remorse. He starts checking on her secretly. In the prison, Oğuz is constantly harassed by the drug lord Kudret and his right-hand Arkan. Ferhunde prompts Şevket into gambling in a club, while Can tries to get close to Leyla. Oğuz breaks out of jail, kidnaps Ferhunde and beats her up. As he's preparing to leave the country, he finds out that Ceyda has bred his son, Han. While seeing Han, Oğuz is arrested and returned to jail. Necla befriends Ceyda. Leyla starts dating Can. Necla finds out about the prostitution business in the pension and prepares to leave before being arrested by the police. Her photo is printed in the newspapers and the Tekins are shocked. She's cleared of charges and goes to her friend's. Ali Riza and Hayriye consider returning Necla to the house, but Leyla is the problem. When she finds out, she asks them to do it, although she has not forgiven Necla yet. Necla refuses to return. When Oğuz hears the news about Necla, he gets angry. Kudret admires Oğuz's honor and sends his gang members to ruin Necla's workplace. She's fired and decides to return to the mansion. Şevket does not talk to her. He loses a lot of money in gambling and steals from the bank accounts to pay his debts. Ahmet, a middle-aged man, falls in love with Neyir and tries to get close to her, but she keeps her distance. Oğuz makes Kudret believe Arkan has stolen his money, and Kudret fires him, giving his place to Oğuz. He uses this chance to make money and pay his debts. Şevket reconciles with Necla, but she and Leyla constantly argue. Sevda, Ali Riza's former girlfriend meets him by chance. When Hayriye finds out, she gets upset and goes to Fikret's in Adapazarı, but returns when Şevket's theft is revealed. Cem meets Necla by chance and realizes that he still loves her; and she feels the same towards him. Sevda passes away and Hayriye reconciles with Ali Riza. Oğuz offers money to Ferhunde secretly in exchange for dropping her complaint and she accepts. Şevket goes to jail and befriends Arkan. Ferhunde decides to have a more comfortable life and plans to seduce Levent, a rich and handsome man. She starts working at his company and soon succeeds in her goal. In the prison, Şevket meets Oğuz, who tells him about his deal with Ferhunde and everything else she's done. Fikret finds out about Ferhunde's infidelity. Necla takes the receipt from Ceyda and shows it to the Tekins, and Fikret reveals Ferhunde's affair. The Tekins expel her and inform Şevket, who decides to divorce Ferhunde, realizing what this marriage cost him. Leyla ends her affair with Can after Ali Riza disapproves it. She saves Necla from death and they finally reconcile. Oğuz leaves jail. Ferhunde denies taking money from Oğuz.

=== Season 3 ===
In the whole season, the Tekins have problems paying Şevket's debt and Fikret's mother-in-law continues annoying her. Cem and Necla get married after finally convincing his family to agree. Şevket's sentence is over and he leaves jail; but he cannot find a job. Oğuz works as a real estate agent and lives with Ceyda and his son, later he marries her. He realizes that Leyla is looking for a job and asks his friend to employ her without telling her about this. Şevket goes to Levent's company and sees him and Ferhunde together; he reveals to Levent that Ferhunde was married to another man before him, but married Şevket because it was more profitable, and now she wants more; this makes Levent hesitate about Ferhunde. Aslı, Levent's former girlfriend who never let go of him, meets Şevket to find out more about Ferhunde's past. Şevket starts working as a taxi driver. Ferhunde receives threats supposedly from Şevket. Necla introduces Leyla to Cem's friend, Nazmi, and they fall in love, but Leyla keeps the past events hidden from him. Ferhunde is beaten up by an unknown man. Şevket, Oğuz and Aslı are the major suspects. In reality, it was Aslı who sent the threats and hired the hitter, but her father pays him and sends him abroad so that they cannot be traced. Aslı tells Levent about Ferhunde's past, and he confronts her, who does not deny anything, and he finally leaves her and marries Aslı. Neyir starts going out with Ahmet. Ferhunde starts working at Yaman's company. She finds out about Leyla and Nazmi and tells him about the past events of the Tekins while adding a lot of lies. Nazmi gets angry and confronts Leyla, who confirms it and leaves him. After that, she and Necla stop talking. The Tekins cannot pay the debts and are forced to sell the mansion. Oğuz finds out and asks Mithat, a middle-aged rich man, to buy the mansion without telling them about this. Şevket and Ferhunde officially divorce. Leyla finds out that Oğuz found her job and the buyer, and confronts him. Mithat allows the Tekins to stay in the mansion until they find a new house and soon befriends them. He meets Ferhunde by chance and falls in love with her without knowing anything about her past, but she keeps her distance. Leyla takes her revenge from Ferhunde by sending her a newspaper archive recalling her childhood abuse. Şevket and Arkan, who has finished his sentence, start construction business. Oğuz and Leyla fall in love and start dating. The Tekins find out and Ali Riza forbids any interaction with her; but Hayriye meets her in secret. Nazmi tries to make peace with Leyla, before finding out about her and Oğuz. Ceyda takes her revenge from them by giving their address to Nazmi. He confronts Leyla and leaves her for good. Leyla believes Necla gave the address and takes her revenge by interrupting Necla's birthday party at the bar. After that Cem and Necla's relationship becomes fragile. Mithat finds out that Ferhunde was the Tekins' in-law and tries to find out more. Ferhunde lies to him about the past to justify herself. Leyla goes under surgery and Hayriye goes to the hospital to visit her even after Ali Riza disagrees. He gets angry and leaves for Fikret's. Şevket falls in love with Sedef and starts dating her. Tahsin blames Ali Riza for his incapability to manage the family and this angers Fikret. Ali Riza does not want them to fight and leaves their house and goes to a hotel in Istanbul. Şevket and Hayriye convince him to return. Tahsin and Fikret reconcile. Ahmet and Neyir get married. Fikret reveals that she's pregnant. Ferhunde accepts Mithat's proposal, but asks him to keep this hidden from the Tekins until they officially get married. Oğuz is suspected of murder and is arrested. Arkan marries a girl from another city and leaves the business for Şevket, and he starts looking for another partner. Ferhunde marries Mithat and forces the Tekins out of the mansion. Şevket vows to avenge and take back the house. Nevertheless, Bench comes along and proposes to Leyla with a Fatima baby ring.

=== Season 4 ===
The Tekins rent a small apartment. Ferhunde convinces Nurdan to live in the mansion. The mansion burns and Ferhunde complains Şevket for arson. Experts state that it was not arson and Şevket is released; this makes Mithat angry at Ferhunde. Nurdan accuses her of having feelings for Şevket. Cem decides to become his partner. Ceyda posts bail for Oğuz and uses this as a leverage not to divorce him. Leyla believes Oğuz is playing her and returns to Ali Riza, who reluctantly lets her in. Şevket prepares to suit Sedef before seeing her talking to another man and mistaking it with an intimate relationship. When he's drunk, he calls and accuses her, upsetting her to the point that she ends the relationship. Oğuz is cleared of charges and knowing that Ceyda borrowed the money from Yaman without telling him it was for Oğuz, takes his revenge from her by revealing the truth to Yaman. Ferhunde leaks to the press that Cem is a former convict's partner; and this becomes a scandal for Cem's family's company. Cem is suffering from a disease and passes away. His family blames Necla and Şevket for this, while she's already having a hard time. Leyla tries to reconcile with her, but she ignores her. Leyla starts seeing Oğuz again. Necla continues Cem's projects while his parents are trying to expel her from the company. Sedef decides to go to work in Milano in order to forget about Şevket. He realizes that Ferhunde has not let go of him and formulates a plan to take his revenge; starting by expressing love to her. Ferhunde doubts his intentions and tests him by using Ceyda; Şevket does not take the bait and Ferhunde is persuaded. Necla tells Leyla that she does not hate her; only that seeing her reminds her of the feeling of guilt and that they should stay away from each other. Oğuz expresses his love for Leyla to Ali Riza, but he pushes him away. A man named Ali meets Necla in business and falls in love with her. Mithat goes on a trip and gives Ferhunde full delegation to do his work. Fikret breeds Tahsin's son, Umut. Ferhunde uses the delegation to take the mansion in case Mithat divorces her. Necla makes contract with Ali's company. Leyla and Şevket keep each other's affairs secret. Ali Riza starts having nervous and cardiovascular problems. Leyla finds out that she's pregnant. Mithat suspects Ferhunde, which angers her. Leyla leaves the house and joins Oğuz, before the Tekins finding out. Oğuz gets involved in racketeering. Şevket steals Ferhunde's cell phone. The Tekins' landlady demands them to leave house due to their continuous arguments. Şevket calls Mithat by Ferhunde's cell and reveals her intentions to him, saying that he has no affair with her and he only wants him to know what she really is. Mithat is about to kill her before Şevket stopping him. She takes her revenge by burning Şevket's building at night. He files a complaint against her while she's trying to sell the mansion and leave the country. The police find and arrest her. Şevket drops his complaint in exchange for her paying compensations and returning the mansion to Mithat. Mithat asks Oğuz to find a buyer for the mansion. Yaman expels Ferhunde from the company. Oğuz buys the mansion for himself to please Leyla and her family, but it makes Ali Riza more angry. Ferhunde's thirst for vengeance increases to the peak. The landlady starts annoying the Tekins in order to force them to leave. They move to stay with Necla temporarily. Fikret and Tahsin start getting distant to each other. Oğuz receives threats from an unknown man. Ferhunde buys a house in the neighborhood of the mansion. Şevket transfers the construction rights to one of the customers to get rid of the debts, leaving all his efforts for the building in vain. Fikret believes Tahsin is cheating and leaves with Umut. Oğuz finds out that the threats came from Seifi, his employer, as a guarantee for his future cooperation. Fikret joins the Tekins at Necla's; meanwhile Tahsin's mother, accusing him of infidelity, is struggling to return Fikret. Mithat offers Şevket a job in his company in gratitude of his favors. Seifi kidnaps Han and forces Oğuz to continue working for him. Ali Riza goes to Tahsin's workplace in Adapazarı and sees Sacide, the woman Fikret is mistaken about; Tahsin explains everything to him. Leyla suspects that Oğuz is involved in illegal activity. Necla falls in love with Ali while the press rumors that they are seeing each other. Ferhunde threatens Necla into letting her work with Ali with telling him about Necla's past. In Milano, a Turkish man named Emir falls in love with Sedef. Fikret decides to return. After everyone blaming him, Tahsin gets drunk and kisses Sacide in his office. When he wakes up, he's shocked to see her in his bed before Fikret calling and informing him of her return. Sacide promises that she'll stay out of his life. Tahsin's mother starts behaving Fikret nicely. He does not talk to Fikret because he has a hard time dealing with his conscience. Şevket accepts Mithat's offer. Ferhunde makes contract with Ali by Necla's support. Cem's parents expel her from the company. She and Ali start dating. The Tekins get angry with her; she reminds them that they're staying in her house, provoking Ali Riza and Şevket to leave. Seifi's thugs rob his money from Oğuz; then they accuse each other of double-crossing. Ferhunde accidentally hits Hayriye with her car, but Ali Riza does not complain Ferhunde as it was an accident. Necla convinces Ali Riza to return. Leyla and Oğuz move in the mansion. Necla tells Ali about her past to get rid of Ferhunde; he revokes his contract with Ferhunde and tells Necla that her past is not important to him. Tahsin tells Fikret about what happened with him and Sacide and asks Fikret to forgive him. Necla and Ali decide to get married. Ferhunde gets depressed after everyone abandoning her. Seifi's workplace is assaulted by his enemies and Leyla finally realizes what Oğuz is doing. Mithat divorces Ferhunde. Necla marries Ali and buys an apartment for the Tekins and a bookstore for Ali Riza. Leyla tries to talk to him, but he ignores her. Ferhunde starts dating a man named Ismail and recovers from her condition. Emir proposes marriage to Sedef, which she accepts because she has fallen in love with him. Oğuz reveals to Şevket and Leyla that he has killed Seifi. Ferhunde ends her relationship with Ismail because she knows his family will not accept her. Mithat gets angry of Şevket for not attending an important transaction, leading Ali Riza to call Şevket and blame him for being idle and useless in his whole life. When the police arrive at the mansion, Şevket states that he is the murderer so that he can be useful for his sister. Fikret decides to leave Tahsin and stay with her friend in Istanbul while keeping her connection with his family. Ali Riza has a heart attack after he hears that Şevket is arrested for murder.

=== Season 5 ===
The Tekins are living in the mansion with Oğuz and Leyla. Ali Riza has become paralyzed and cannot speak to anyone but himself. Ferhunde has ended her grudge against the Tekins. She and Ceyda have opened an estate agency with Oğuz's money. Sedef and Emir have returned to Turkey and become engaged. Şevket is spending time in prison without telling the truth to anyone. Fikret has bought a house and is planning to move after it is repaired. Necla has problems with Ali and does not talk to the Tekins because they have chosen Leyla. Tahsin decides to move his family to Istanbul in order to stay close to Fikret. She moves to her own house. Ali Riza finds out that Şevket is innocent. Using alphabetic letters, he states that Oğuz is the murderer; but no one believes him. Oğuz sends him to a rehabilitation facility to keep the truth hidden; but Şevket forces Oğuz to return Ali Riza. Hayriye inherits a house from her aunt in Trabzon. Leyla feels guilty because of Şevket. Ali Riza tells her to reveal the truth to the district attorney, and she does. Oğuz escapes while she gives birth to her daughter. Ali Riza realizes how valuable his children are and decides to reunite his family once more. Ferhunde tells him that she will always consider him a great man. Mithat falls in love with Rihan, Fikret's friend. Ceyda expels Ferhunde from her agency because she helped prove Oğuz's secret. Necla reconciles with the Tekins. Ali Riza starts regaining his motor abilities. Necla and Ali agree for divorce. Rihan accepts Mithat's proposal. Ferhunde becomes nearly penniless and accepts Ali's offer for a job. Oğuz is critically shot trying to escape and moved to intensive care after operation. Fikret decides to stay with the Tekins. Ceyda plans to take Oğuz's properties after he dies. Sedef and Emir decide to get married. Fikret finally forgives Tahsin and moves back. Oğuz regains consciousness and confesses the murder. Necla resigns from Ali's company. Ceyda puts the mansion on sale with Oğuz's permission with the condition of Leyla having a share. Necla is revealed to be pregnant. Ferhunde is happy to find out that Nurdan is dating a man. After the divorce, Necla tells Ali about the baby and he accepts to be its father. Şevket is exonerated on the day of Sedef's wedding. He arrives with the family to surprise Ali Riza before finding out that he has passed away. The Tekins move to Hayriye's house in Trabzon with Fikret stating that Şevket will be leading the family now. The final scene is Hayriye remembering what Ali Riza said to her on the day they arrived in Istanbul; that everything is OK because he had not died yet.
