= Hande Soral =

Turkish actress (born 1987)

- Born: 22 February 1987 (age 39); İnegöl, Turkey
- Education: Istanbul Bilgi University
- Occupation: Actress
- Years active: 2008–present
- Spouse: İsmail Demirci (m. 2017)
- Children: 1
- Relatives: Bensu Soral (sister)

Hande Soral Demirci (born 22 February 1987) is a Cypriot-Turkish actress.

== Life and career ==
Originally from İnegöl, she completed her primary, secondary, and postsecondary education there, graduating from the Department of Psychology at the Bilgi University in Istanbul. Her career as an actress began when she appeared as a guest actor, in 2008, for a part on "Komedi Dükkanı" comedy improvisation series. This eventually led to offers of other roles from the show's producer when the program ended.

Her breakthrough role is in popular series Küçük Kadınlar. She played in period series "Bir Günah Gibi" which based from novel "Kurt Seyt ve Murka". She played in "Yılanların Öcü" based from novel. From 2018-2019, she was a lead actress in season 5 of Diriliş: Ertuğrul alongside Engin Altan Düzyatan. In 2021, she played the character of Ümit in Bir Zamanlar Çukurova series. She was cast in historical series "Fatih" and Çalıkuşu which based from classic novel.

=== Personal life ===
Hande Soral married İsmail Demirci on 14 October 2017. On 6 June 2022, she gave birth to her first child, a boy named Ali.

== Filmography ==
Web series
Year	Title	Role	Note
2022	Alef	Su Demir	
2025	Gassal	Nihan	
TV series
Year	Title	Role	Note
2008–2011	Küçük Kadınlar	Armağan Gezici	
2011	Bir Günah Gibi	Figen	
2012–2013	Alev Alev	Ümran	
2013	Fatih	Gevherhan Sultan	
2014	Çalıkuşu	Azelya	
2014	Yılanların Öcü	Fatma	
2016	Kalbim Yangın Yeri	Leyla	
2017	Evlat Kokusu	Zeynep	
2017	İsimsizler	Handan	
2018–19	Diriliş: Ertuğrul	İlbilge Hatun	Main
2021	Bir Zamanlar Çukurova	Ümit	
2023–2024	Ateş Kuşları	Mercan Ateş / Gökova	
2026	Evlilik Güzeldir	Zeynep Bahtiyar	Main
Films
Year	Title	Role	Note
2014	Birleşen Gönüller	Cennet	
2017	Biz Size Döneriz	Lale	
2017	Tahin Pekmez	Esra	TV movie
2020	Kovala	Öykü	
2020	Müstakbel Damat		
2023	Murat Göğebakan: Kalbim Yaralı	Senem	
2024	Akıldan Kalbe	Defne	
Programs
Year	Title	Role	Note
2008	Komedi Dükkanı	Herself	Guest appearance
2010	Gecekondu	Herself	Guest appearance
