= Pınar Çağlar Gençtürk =

Turkish actress (born 1982)

- Born: 6 March 1982 (age 44); İzmit, Kocaeli, Turkey
- Education: Yeditepe University
- Occupation: Actress

Pınar Çağlar Gençtürk (born 6 March 1982) is a Turkish actress.

== Life and career ==
She graduated from the Department of Theatre at the Faculty of Fine Arts of Yeditepe University. She also completed a master's degree in film and drama at Kadir Has University.

She won the Best Supporting Actress in a Musical or Comedy Award at the 17th Afife Theatre Awards for the play Yalnızlar Kulübü. She also won the Best Supporting Actress Sadri Alışık Award for the same play.

She portrayed the character Aylin in the television series Yargı.

== Filmography ==
TV series
Year	Title	Role
2011–2013	Muhteşem Yüzyıl	Beyhan Sultan
2012	Çıplak Gerçek	Gülsen
2013–2014	Çalıkuşu	Münevver
2016	Arkadaşlar İyidir	Sema Kahraman
2017	Evlat Kokusu	Meryem
2018–2019	Bizim Hikaye	Ferda
2019	Kadın	Jale Demir
2020–2021	Arıza	Emine
2021–2024	Yargı	Aylin Erguvan Yılmaz
2024–2025	Sen Ağlama İstanbul	Hümeyra
2025	Platonik: Mavi Dolunay Otel	Nebahat
2025	Çarpıntı	Meryem Alkan
2026–	Ömür Usta	Yıldız
Film
Year	Title	Role
2009	7 Kocalı Hürmüz	Havva
2010	Herkes mi Aldatır?	Arzu
2014	Siccîn	Nisa
2015	Misofonya	Ece
2015	Denizatı	Mryie
2020	Hayat	
2025	Sahibinden Rahmet	Nuray
TBD	Gizli Dolap	Mira

== Theatre ==
Theatre
Year	Title	Role	Venue	Notes
2011	Disosya Harikalar Dünyası	Lisa	İkincikat	Actress
2012	Kurabiye Ev	Stacey	Yan Etki	Actress
2013	Yalnızlar Külübü		İkincikat	Actress
2015	Kar Küresinde Bir Tavşan	Kadife	İkincikat	Actress
2015	Hepimizin Öyküsü Aynı		Craft Tiyatro	Actress
2016	Aşk Delisi	May	Oyun Atölyesi	Actress
2017	Işıltılı Haşereler	Jill	İkincikat	Actress
2018	Yan Rol		İnfiniti Sahne	Director
2019	Ben Cuma		Koma Sahnesi	Director
2019	Daha İyi Günlerimiz Olmuştu		Oyun Atölyesi	Actress

== Awards and nominations ==
Awards
Year	Award	Category	Work	Result	Ref.
2013	17th Afife Theatre Awards	Best Supporting Actress in a Musical or Comedy of the Year	Yalnızlar Kulübü	Won	
2013	18th Sadri Alışık Theatre and Cinema Actor Awards	Best Supporting Actress – Theatre	Yalnızlar Kulübü	Won	
2013	13th Direklerarası Audience Awards	Small Venue Actress Award	Disosya	Won	
2016	21th Sadri Alışık Theatre and Cinema Actors Awards	Selection Committee Special Award	Hepimizin Öyküsü Aynı	Won	
2016	20th Afife Theatre Awards	Best Actress of the Year	Kar Küresinde Bir Tavşan	Nominated	
2018	23rd Sadri Alışık Theatre and Cinema Actors Awards	Best Actress of the Year; Theatre Comedy/Black Comedy/Musical	Işıltılı Haşereler	Nominated	
2022	24th Afife Theatre Awards	Best Supporting Actress of the Year	Daha İyi Günlerimiz Olmuştu	Nominated	
