= Fahriye Evcen =

Turkish actress (born 1986)

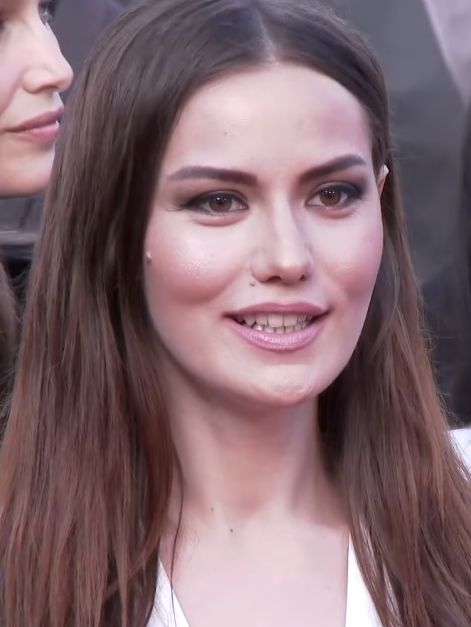
- Evcen in 2017
- Born: 4 June 1986 (age 40); Solingen, North Rhine-Westphalia, West Germany
- Citizenship: Germany; Turkey
- Education: Boğaziçi University; Heinrich Heine University Düsseldorf
- Years active: 2005–present
- Spouse: Burak Özçivit (m. 2017)
- Children: 2

Fahriye Evcen Özçivit (née Evcen; born 4 June 1986) is a German-born Turkish actress and model. She is known for her roles as in the TV series Yaprak Dökümü (2006–2010) and Çalıkuşu (2013–2014), both based on novels by Reşat Nuri Güntekin.

== Life and career ==
At young age while she was on a vacation in Turkey, she took part in a program of Oya Aydoğan, who introduced her to producer İbrahim Mertoğlu. One of her first prominent roles was that of the character of Necla in the TV series Yaprak Dökümü. Her first cinematic debut was with the movie Cennet, released in 2008, and in the same year she was cast in a leading role in the movie Aşk Tutulması. As Evcen had not finished her studies in Germany, she enrolled in Boğaziçi University and studied history. She later played the character Feride in the TV series Çalıkuşu produced by TİMS Productions. She later acted in the movie Aşk Sana Benzer opposite Burak Özçivit. In 2017 she acted in the TV series Ölene Kadar opposite Engin Akyürek and also played in the movie Sonsuz Aşk opposite Murat Yıldırım. In 2021, she acted in Alparslan: Büyük Selçuklu as Akça Hatun, and in the same year she launched her own line of clothing under the name Ivy People.

== Personal life ==
Her maternal family is of Circassian descent. Her paternal family is of Turkish descent who immigrated from Kavala, Ottoman Empire. On 29 June 2017, she married actor and model Burak Özçivit in Istanbul. Their first son named Karan was born on 13 April 2019. Their second son named Kerem was born on 18 January 2023.

== Filmography ==
Film
Year	Film	Role	Notes
2007	Cennet	Kız	Leading role
2008	Aşk Tutulması	Pınar	Leading role
2010	Spur des terrors takiye / Takiye: Allah Yolunda	Sevde	German, Turkish
2011	Signora Enrica	Young Signora Enrica	Italian, Turkish
2012	Evim Sensin	Leyla	Leading role
2015	Aşk Sana Benzer	Deniz/Defne	Leading role
2017	Sonsuz Aşk	Zeynep	Leading role

Television
Year	Work	Role	Notes
2005	Asla Unutma	Pınar	Supporting role
2006	Hasret	Songül	Supporting role
2006–2010	Yaprak Dökümü	Necla Tekin Aydınoğlu	Leading role
2011	Yalancı Bahar	Zeynep	Leading role
2012	Veda	Mehpare	Leading role
2013–2014	Çalıkuşu	Feride	Leading role
2014	Kurt Seyit ve Şura	Mürvet (Murka)	Leading role
2017	Ölene Kadar	Selvi Nardan/Vildan	Leading role
2021–2022	Alparslan: Büyük Selçuklu	Akça Hatun	Leading role

=== Ads / partnerships ===
Ads
Year	Company/product	Slogan
2011	Ülker Golf Bravo	"BRAVO YOUR DREAM DELICACY"
2015-2021	L'Oréal	"Because we're worth it"
2017—2019	Koton	"Fashion at Koton"
2019	Anasthesia lenses	
2021–	Prima	
2021–	Divanev	

== Awards and nominations ==
year	Awards	category	work	Result
2013	YTÜ Stars of the Year Award	Most Admired Cinema Actress	Evim Sensin	Won
2013	Siyaset Dergisi Awards	Cinema Actress of the Year	Evim Sensin	Won
2013	MGD 19th Golden Lens Awards	Best Female Cinema Actress	Evim Sensin	Won
2014	Elle Styles Awards	Most Stylish Actress of the Year		Won
2016	YTÜ Stars of the Year Award	Most Popular Cinema Actress	Aşk Sana Benzer	Won
2016	Golden Sebilj Awards	Actress of the Year	Çalıkuşu	Won
2017	AYD Awards	Most Acclaimed Brand Face	Koton	Won
2017	Istanbul University 1453 Award	Best Actress	Sonsuz Aşk / Ölene Kadar	Won
2017	Turkey Youth Awards	Best Film Actress	Sonsuz Aşk	Won
2020	Sinemaport Awards	Best Cinema Actress		Nominated
2021	Türkiye Kristal Küre Ödülleri	Best Female Actress	Alparslan: Büyük Selçuklu	Won
