= Alper Mestçi =

Turkish author and film director

Alper Mestci
- Born: 1969 (age 56–57); Istanbul, Turkey
- Occupations: Film director; screenwriter; writer
- Years active: 1995–present
- Notable work: Siccîn; Musallat
- Spouse: Gülhan Şen (m. 2015)

Alper Mestçi is a Turkish screenwriter, film director and author.

== Life and career ==
After starting his professional career in 1995, he edited write and directed programs such as ATV's Şok, Kanal D's Beyaz Show and Zaga, Kanal 6's Hızar, and TV8's Dikkat Şahan Çıkabilir, Zoka, Bi İş İçin Lazım and Uzman Avı. He also worked as a columnist for Milliyet and Tempo.

Mestçi, who prepared the anti-media / humor website named Shockhaber.com together with Hüseyin Özcan from 2001, later published the humor content available on his website as three separate books titled Saçmala, Radar Oldum, and Takıntılar respectively.

In 2003, he wrote the column "Serin Duruş" together with Hüseyin Özcan for the Milliyet newspaper, which was awarded for their delicate use of Turkish language at the Karaman Türk Dili Awards.

In 2005, he took on the duties of directing and screenwriting for an multimedia-sketch program called Dikkat Şahan Çıkabilir Alper Mestçi's film career started in 2006 when the horror story he prepared with Güray Ölgü and Şahan Gökbakar made it to the big screen and was adapted as a movie.

Mestçi, who had his first film directing experience in 2007 with Musallat, wrote the movie's screenplay together with Güray Ölgü.

In 2009, Mestçi, who had experience with the comedy genre during his television career, directed the comedy movie Kanal-i-zasyon, and continued his career by producing another horror film in 2010.

After releasing a sequel for Musallat in 2011, Mestçi started working on a series of horror movies titled SİCCÎN, and meanwhile directed the comedy movies Sabit Kanca and Sabit Kanca 2.

In 2015, he married the presenter of Gülhan'ın Galaksi Rehberi, Gülhan Şen.

== Filmography ==
Movies
Year	Title	Genre	Role				Notes
Year	Title	Genre	Producer	director	Screenwriter	Other	Notes
2006	Gen	Thriller	No	No	No	Yes	Narrator, executive producer.
2007	Musallat	Horror	Yes	Yes	Yes	No	
2009	Kanal-i-zasyon	Comedy	No	Yes	No	Yes	Narrator.
2010	Üç Harfliler: Marid	Horror	Yes	No	No	No	
2011	Musallat 2: Lanet	Horror	No	Yes	Yes	No	
2013	Sabit Kanca	Comedy	No	Yes	Yes	No	
2014	SİCCÎN: Büyü Haramdır	Horror	No	Yes	No	No	
2014	Sabit Kanca 2	Comedy	No	Yes	No	No	
2015	SİCCÎN 2	Horror	No	Yes	Yes	No	
2016	Üç Harfliler 3: Karabüyü	Horror	No	Yes	Yes	No	
2016	SİCCÎN 3: Cürmü Aşk	Horror	No	Yes	Yes	No	
2017	SİCCÎN 4	Horror	No	Yes	Yes	No	
2018	SİCCÎN 5	Horror	No	Yes	Yes	No	
2019	SİCCÎN 6	Horror	No	Yes	Yes	No	
2022	Mahlûkat	Horror	No	Yes	Yes	No	
2023	Haile: Bir Aile Kâbusu	Horror	Yes	Yes	Yes	No	
2024	Siccîn 7	Korku	No	Yes	Yes	No	

== Bibliography ==
- "Radar Oldum" (with Hüseyin Özcan). Istanbul, 2003. ISBN 9789752810075
- "Saçmalama" (with Hüseyin Özcan). Istanbul, 2003. ISBN 9789758441891
- "Takıntılar" (with Hüseyin Özcan). Istanbul, 2005. ISBN 9789752810327
