= Burak Özçivit =

Turkish actor (born 1984)

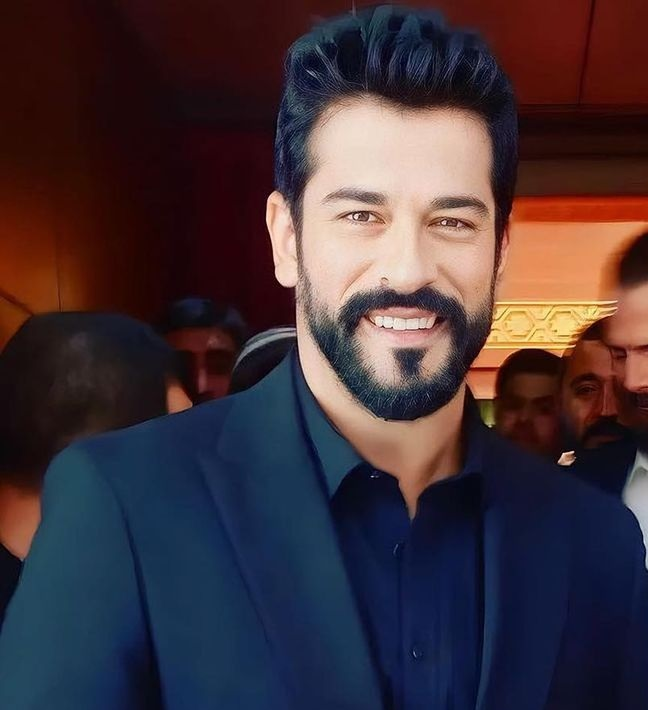
- Özçivit in 2023
- Born: 24 December 1984 (age 41); Istanbul, Turkey
- Education: Marmara University
- Occupations: Actor; model
- Years active: 2003–present
- Spouse: Fahriye Evcen (m. 2017)
- Children: 2

Burak Özçivit (born 24 December 1984) is a Turkish actor and model who is best known for his roles in Çalıkuşu, Kara Sevda and as the titular role of Osman Gazi in the Turkish historical fiction TV series Kuruluş: Osman. Throughout his acting career Özçivit has been a recipient of numerous accolades.

== Early life ==
Burak Özçivit was born on 24 December 1984 in Istanbul, to a family of migrants from Gaziantep. He was educated at Kazım İşmen High School and graduated from Marmara University, Faculty of Fine Arts, Department of Photography.

== Career ==
In 2003, Burak Özçivit was elected the Top Model of Turkey and began working with several modeling agencies. In 2005, he was chosen as the second best model in the world. Özçivit's acting career began with the television series Eksi 18 in 2006. After the iconic actor Kartal Tibet directed in series "Zoraki Koca", his breakthrough came with the character Ömer in "Zoraki Koca". He later starred in series Baba Ocağı and İhanet. He appeared in the movie Musallat and as Çet/Çetin starred in the television series Küçük Sırlar, the Turkish adaptation of Gossip Girl. He then starred in Muhteşem Yüzyıl as Malkoçoğlu Bali Bey.

Özçivit then appeared as Kamran in the TV adaptation of Çalıkuşu opposite Fahriye Evcen. Together with Evcen, he made the movie Aşk Sana Benzer and later played in the movie Kardeşim Benim opposite Murat Boz. In 2015, he starred in the Turkish drama series Kara Sevda as Kemal Soydere. The series became a global hit. Özçivit also owns a production company named BRK's production. He later went on to portray the lead role of Osman Gazi, the founder of the Ottoman Empire in Turkish historical fiction TV series Kuruluş: Osman, for a record six seasons. The series gained popularity worldwide and is very well-received in South Asia, Central Asia, the Middle East and Latin America.

== Personal life ==
Burak Özçivit is a practicing Sunni Muslim. He resides in Istinye, Sarıyer, Istanbul.

He became engaged to Turkish actress Fahriye Evcen on 9 March 2017 in Germany, and they married in Istanbul on 29 June 2017. Together the couple have two children, a boy named Karan (born 2019) and a boy named Kerem (born 2023).

== Filmography ==
=== Film ===
Year	Title	Role	Notes
2007	Musallat	Suat	
2013	Zarafa	Hasan (voice only)	
2015	Aşk Sana Benzer	Balıkçı Ali	
2016	Kardeşim Benim	Hakan	
2017	Kardeşim Benim 2	Hakan	
2018	Can Feda	Captain Alparslan	
2024	Yolki 11		Russian film

=== Television ===
Year	Title	Role	Notes
2006	Eksi 18	Murat	
2007	Zoraki Koca	Ömer Özpolat	
2008–2009	Baba Ocağı	Güven	
2010	İhanet	Emir	
2010–2011	Küçük Sırlar	Çetin Ateşoğlu	
2011–2013	Muhteşem Yüzyıl	Malkoçoğlu Balı Bey	
2013–2014	Çalıkuşu	Kamran	
2015–2017	Kara Sevda	Kemal Soydere	
2019–2025	Kuruluş Osman	Osman I	
2026	Güneşin Doğduğu Yer	Kenan Kozan	

=== Advertising ===
Year	Company/product
2013–2014	Pepsi
2013–2014	ClearMen
2013–2019	ClearMen
2017–2018	Emaar Square Mall
2018–present	Altınyıldız Classics
2021–present	Trem Global
2021–present	PUBG Mobile
2022–present	Tor Holding
2024	Singer Bangladesh

== Awards and nominations ==
Year	Awards	Category	Work	Result	Ref.
2012	GQ Men of the Year Awards	Actor of the Year	Muhteşem Yüzyıl	Won	
2013	Galatasaray University Bests of 2012 Awards	Best TV Actor	Muhteşem Yüzyıl	Won	
2014	12th Yıldız Technical University Awards	Most Liked TV Actor	Çalıkuşu	Won	
2014	13th Magazinci.com Internet Media (Bests)	Best TV Actor	Çalıkuşu	Won	
2014	4th Elle Style Awards	Elle Style Actor of the Year	Çalıkuşu	Won	
2014	Haliç University Bests of 2014 Awards	Best Actor	Çalıkuşu	Won	
2015	4th Bilkent Television Awards	Best Drama Actor	Kara Sevda	Won	
2015	6th Ayaklı Newspaper TV Stars Awards	Best Drama Series Actor	Kara Sevda	Won	
2016	14th Yıldız Technical University Awards	Most Liked Movie Actor	Aşk Sana Benzer	Won	
2016	23rd İTÜ EMÖS Achievement Awards	Most Successful Movie Actor of the Year	Aşk Sana Benzer	Won	
2016	16th Magazinci.com Internet Media (Bests)	TV Performance of the Year	Kara Sevda	Won	
2016	2nd Turkey Youth Awards	Best Cinema Actor	Aşk Sana Benzer	Nominated	
2016	Ege University 5th Media Awards	Best TV Actor	Kara Sevda	Nominated	
2016	Galatasaray University Bests of 2016 Awards	Best TV/Movie Actor	Aşk Sana Benzer	Nominated	
2016	43rd Pantene Golden Butterfly Awards	Best Actor	Kara Sevda	Nominated	
2016	43rd Pantene Golden Butterfly Awards	Best TV Couple (Nihan & Kemal)	Kara Sevda	Nominated	
2016	Muzikonair Awards	Best Actor in a TV Series	Kara Sevda	Won	
2017	44th Pantene Golden Butterfly Awards	Best Actor	Kara Sevda	Nominated	
2017	The ONE Objective Awards	The Most Successful Celebrity of the Year	Kara Sevda	Won	
2017	GQ Men of the Year Awards	The Most Popular Man of the Year	Kara Sevda	Won	
2017	Kemal Sunal Culture and Art Awards	Best Actor	Kara Sevda	Won	
2017	Individual Educational Institutions (Best of the Year)	Best Actor of the Year	Kara Sevda	Won	
2017	Turkey Youth Awards	Best Movie Actor	Kardeşim Benim	Nominated	
2018	Turkey Youth Awards	Best Movie Actor	Kardeşim Benim 2	Nominated	
2019	18th Yıldız Technical University Awards	Most Admired Actor	Can Feda	Won	
2020	Turkey Youth Awards	Best TV Actor	Kuruluş: Osman	Nominated	
2020	6th Golden 61 Awards (Istanbul University)	Best Male Actor of the Year	Kuruluş: Osman	Won	
2020	Radio Television Journalists Association (RTGD Oscars)	Best Male Actor of the Year	Kuruluş: Osman	Won	
2021	Quality of Magazine 2021 Awards	Best Male Actor	Kuruluş: Osman	Won	
2021	Eurasian Consumer Protection Association Award (Avrasya Tüketicileri koruma Derneği ödül)	Best Actor	Kuruluş: Osman	Won	
2021	Golden Palm Awards	Best Actor of the Year	Kuruluş: Osman	Won	
2021	European Awards	Best Actor	Kuruluş: Osman	Won	
2021	7th Golden 61 Awards (Istanbul University)	Best TV Series Couple of the Year (Osman Bey & Bala Hatun)	Kuruluş: Osman	Nominated	
2021	7th Golden 61 Awards (Istanbul University)	Best Male Actor of the Year	Kuruluş: Osman	Won	
2021	48th Golden Butterfly Awards	Best Actor	Kuruluş: Osman	Nominated	
2021	Soap Awards France 2021	Best International Actor	Kara Sevda	Nominated	
2021	9th TV Stars Flip Newspaper Awards	Best Actor	Kuruluş: Osman	Won	
2022	Turkey Youth Awards	Best TV Actor	Kuruluş: Osman	Nominated	
