= İsmail Demirci =

Turkish actor (born 1984)

- Born: November 13, 1984 (age 41); Ankara, Turkey
- Occupation: Actor
- Years active: 2010–present
- Spouse: Hande Soral (m. 2017)
- Children: 1

İsmail Demirci (born 13 November 1984) is a Turkish actor.

Demirci was born in 1984 in Ankara. His family, who immigrated from Bulgaria, is of Turkish descent. In 2009, he graduated from Anadolu University State Conservatory with a degree in theatre studies.

He made his television debut in 2010 with a role in the popular family comedy İki Aile series. He continued his career by appearing in recurring roles in series such as Anneler ile Kızları, Fabrika Kızı, Serçe Sarayı, Babamın Günahları. His period roles are in Mehmed:Bir Cihan Fatihi, Mor Menekşeler, Ben Onu Çok Sevdim, Türkan, Muhteşem Yüzyıl: Kösem.

In 2014, he was cast in the surreal comedy movie Tut Sözünü, followed by Babaların Babası in 2016, and Posta Kutusu in 2017. For his performance in Posta Kutusu, he won the Best Actor award at the Krajina Film Festival.

He briefly appeared in the crime series such as Çarpışma, Kurtlar Vadisi Pusu, Reaksiyon. In 2019, he was cast in a leading role in Kuzey Yıldızı İlk Aşk.

== Filmography ==
Film
Title	Role	Year	Note
Tut Sözünü		2014	
Babaların Babası	Berk Çetin	2016	
Posta Kutusu		2017	
Short Film
Title	Role	Year	Note
Sessiz Gece	Ozan		

Tv series
Title	Role	Year	Note
Mehmed:Fetihler Sultani	Gedik Ahmed Pasha)	2026	
İyilik	Murat Karacakaya)	2022	
Yalancılar ve Mumları	Engin Sezer	2021	
Kuzey Yıldızı İlk Aşk	Kuzey Mollaoğlu	2019–2021	
Çarpışma	Galip	2018	
Mehmed: Bir Cihan Fatihi	Şehzade Orhan	2018	
Babamın Günahları	Reha	2018	
Muhteşem Yüzyıl: Kösem	Kemankeş Kara Mustafa Pasha	2016–2017	
Fabrika Kızı	Ferhat	2015	
Serçe Sarayı	Ramazan	2015	
Reaksiyon	Tekin	2014	
Kurtlar Vadisi Pusu	Erkan	2012–2013	
Ben Onu Çok Sevdim	Talat	2013–2014	
Mor Menekşeler	Harun	2012	
Anneler ile Kızları	Sedat	2011	
Türkan	Assistant Doctor Mehmet		
İki Aile			
Mehmed: Fetihler Sultanı	Gedik Ahmet Pasha	2025-2026	

=== As voice actor ===
- İrfan in University (narrator) (2013)
