= Seda Demir =

Turkish actress

- Occupation: Actress
- Years active: 2007–present

Seda Demir is a Turkish television and movie actress. She rose to fame with her role in the TV series Yaprak Dökümü (2007–2010).

== Career ==
Demir worked as a hostess in different fairs, and later registered at an acting agency with the encouragement of her friends. She was summoned for acting tests and short shootings several times, and for a while stopped showing up for the shootings. Her first job as an actress was in a commercial for Türkiye İş Bankası. She then started to appear in various commercials and advertisements. She made her TV debut with Yaprak Dökümü as Sedef. After the series' finale, in 2011 she played the role of Sude in the TV series Yıldız Masalı. She then returned to television in 2013 with a role in İntikam as Selen. This was followed by another role in the 2014 TV series Beyaz Karanfil as Elif. In 2015, she had her cinema debut with the movie Evlenmeden Olmaz and played the character of Ayşe.

== Filmography ==
Television
Year	Title	Role
2007–2010	Yaprak Dökümü	Sedef
2011	Yıldız Masalı	Sude
2013	İntikam	Selen
2014	Beyaz Karanfil	Elif

Cinema
Year	Title	Role
2015	Evlenmeden Olmaz	Ayşe

Theatre
Year	Title	Director
2009	72. Koğuş	Kemal Başar

Competitions
Year	Title	Result
2017	Survivor 2017	Eliminated
