= Okan Bayülgen =

Turkish actor

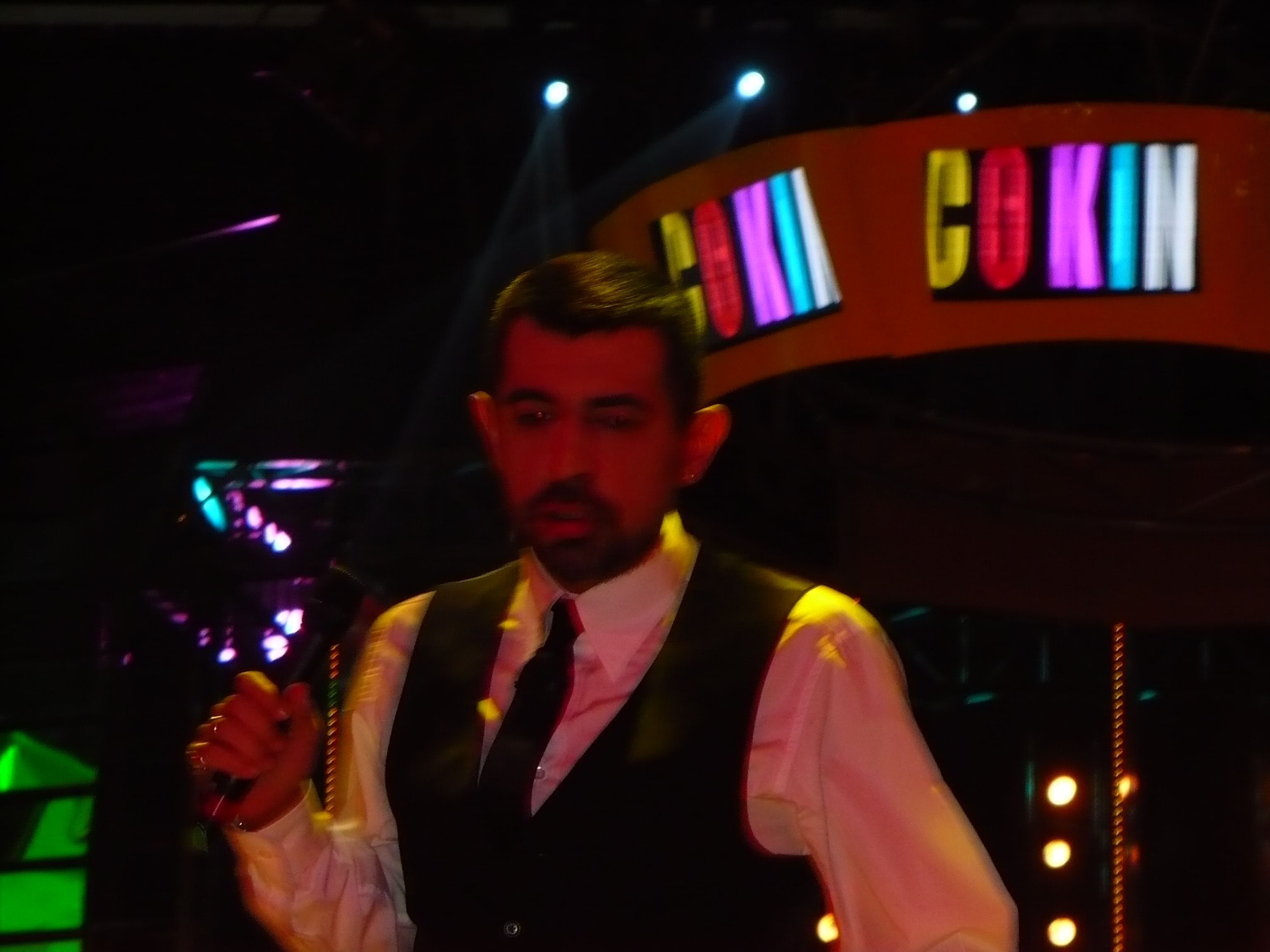
Okan Bayülgen in 2009

Kaan Okan Bayülgen (born 23 March 1964) is a Turkish actor, theater founder, variety, talk show host, comedian, photographer, dubbing performer, writer, director.

== Early life ==
Bayülgen was born on 23 March 1964 in Istanbul, Turkey, to a lawyer father and a painter mother.

He spent six years at the Galatasaray High School which he calls emotionally harsh years before transferring to Bodrum High School, he eventually graduated from Şişli High School in 1984. Bayülgen attended the Faculty of Law in France and transferred to the Faculty of Economics and Administrative Sciences. After a year, he returned to Turkey and graduated from the Mimar Sinan Fine Arts University State Conservatory in 1989 with a master's degree.

== Career ==
Bayülgen is also one of the most popular dubbing performers in Turkey.

In addition, Bayülgen has worked as a photographer and continues his work until this day.

Bayülgen started his career as a director at State Theaters in 1989 and also worked as an actor there. He took part in the American TV series "The Young Indiana Jones Chronicles" (1992), filming in Istanbul. In 1994, he worked at the state theatre in Trabzon. However, because his play got canceled by the executive directors, he quickly quit.

Baylügen established his acting career in "İstanbul Kanatlarımın Altında", a film by Mustafa Altıoklar from 1996. In 1997, he won the Best Actor Award from Sadri Alışık Acting Awards, for his role in "Ağır Roman“. Further film credits included "Romantik" (1999), "Oyun Bozan" (2000), "Hemşo" (2001), "Komser Şekspir" (2001), "Sır Çocukları" (2002) and "Gülüm" (2002) in addition to taking place in several television series.

He founded in "Dada Theatre". He works as actor, writer, director, productor in own theater. He played in Amadeus and "Richard". He wrote and directed in modern adaptation "Richard".

=== Programming Career ===
In 1991, he began his broadcasting career and hosted his own radio show at Kent FM.

After a successful radio career, he created his late-night show "Gece Kuşu" ("The Night Bird") (Also meaning "Night Owl") for television in 1995 which brought him huge success. In 1996, he appeared on TV with a new late-night TV show, called "Televizyon Çocuğu" ("The Television Kid").

After a two-year break, he returned to television with his show "Zaga" which brought him his greatest success so far. In 2005, his late-night television show "Televizyon Makinası" ("Television Machine") was followed by his new show Makina (Machine) in 2006 and 2007.

After a break of one year, he started a new television show Disko Kralı, (Disco King) in 2008.

== Filmography ==
Movies

- 1996 - İstanbul Kanatlarımın Altında, (Istanbul Under My Wings)
- 1997 - Ağır Roman, (The Heavy Novel)
- 1999 - Romantik, (Romantic)
- 2000 - Oyun Bozan, (Wet Blanket)
- 2001 - Hemşo, (Homie)
- 2001 - Komser Şekspir, (Sheakspeare the Commissar)
- 2002 - Sır Çocukları, (Children of Mystery)
- 2002 - Gülüm, (My Dear)
- 2006 - Sınav, (The Exam)
- 2009 - Kanalizasyon, (Sewage TV)

Movie serials

- 1998 - Utanmaz Adam, (Shameless Man)
- 2004 - Size Baba Diyebilir miyim?, (May I Call You 'Daddy'?)

Theatre pieces

- 1998 - Atları da Vururlar Müzikali, (actor) (Horace McCoy - They Shoot Horses, Don't They?) (musical)
- 2003~2004 - Hangisi Karısı, (director) (Ray Cooney - Run For Your Wife)
- 2005~2006 - Kiralık Oyun, (actor) (Rented Game)

== TV shows ==
- Herkes Bunu Konuşuyor, (Everybody is Talking This) (2004–2005, NTV)
- Haber Makinası, (News Machine) (2006, CNN Türk)
- Bu Sizi İlgilendiriyor, (This Interests You) (2007, NTV)
- Okan Bayülgen Sade Vatandaş, (Okan Bayülgen Simple Citizen) (2008–2009, NTV)
- Çek Bakalım, (Let's Shoot) (2011...., ATV)

=== Late Night ===
- Gece Kuşu, (The Night Bird) (1994, ATV)
- Televizyon Çocuğu, (The Television Kid) (1996, ATV)
- Zaga, (Zaga) (1997–2005, Kanal D)
- Televizyon Makinası, (Television Machine) (2005–2006, Kanal D)
- Makina, (Machine) (2006–2007, Kanal D)
- Disko Kralı, (King of Disco) (2008–2011, Kanal D)
  - Medya Kralı, (King of Media) (2009–2011, Kanal D)
  - Muhabbet Kralı, (King of Chat) (2009–2011, Kanal D; 2019–2020, TV100)
  - Kraliyet Ailesi, (Royal Family) (2011–2013, TV8)
- Dada Dandinista, (2014–2016, Star TV)
- Okan Bayülgen ile Uykusuzlar Kulübü (2019–2020, TV100)
- Nokta (2020–present, TV100)

== Photo exhibitions ==
- Baobab Yolu - Madagaskar, (Baobab Road - Madagascar), (2006)
- Yaşam Gücü, (Life Power), (2006)
- Pudra - Zamanın Tozu, (Powder - Dust of Time), (2007)
- Erkeklerin Saatlerini Takan Kadınlar, (Women Wearing Men's Watches), (2008)
- Çünkü Gördüğüm En Güzel Kız Sensin, (Because You're the Most Beautiful Girl I've Ever Seen) (-Dove's Global Campaign for Real Beauty), (2008)
