= Two Hearts as One =

- Film poster
- Turkish: Birleşen Gönüller
- Directed by: Hasan Kiraç
- Starring: Serkan Şenalp; Hande Soral
- Music by: Evanthia Reboutsika
- Release date: 13 November 2014
- Running time: 126 minutes
- Country: Turkey
- Language: Turkish

Two Hearts as One (Turkish: Birleşen Gönüller) is a 2014 Turkish drama film directed by Hasan Kiraç.

== Cast ==
- Serkan Şenalp - Young Niyaz
- Hande Soral - Young Cennet
- Yagmur Kasifoglu - Dilek
- Atılgan Gümüş - Yunus Ogretmen
- Sema Ceyrekbasi - Old Cennet
- Fikret Hakan - Niyaz
