= Yeşil Gece =

1928 book by Reşat Nuri Güntekin

Yeşil Gece ("The Green Night") is a novel by Turkish author and playwright Reşat Nuri Güntekin, written in 1928.

The novel is about Şahin, a boy who is sent to a medrese (an Islamic school) by his devoutly Muslim father. Şahin rebels against his father and takes up rational thought and secularism. He then goes on to spread his ideology on the people of a small town in the background of the Turkish War of Independence and formation of the Turkish Republic.
