= Kanalizasyon =

- Film poster
- Directed by: Alper Mestçi
- Written by: Murat Aykul; Alper Mestçi
- Produced by: Kemal Kaplanoglu; Murat Toktamisoglu
- Starring: Okan Bayulgen; Hakan Yılmaz
- Production companies: Dada Film; Tiglon
- Distributed by: Tiglon
- Release date: October 23, 2009
- Running time: 90 minutes
- Country: Turkey
- Language: Turkish
- Box office: ₺2,092,067

Kanalizasyon is a 2009 Turkish comedy film directed by Alper Mestçi.

== Plot ==
The movie portrays İmdat, a poor, uneducated, working class window cleaner who has migrated to the big city. As he cleans the windows of the private TV channel Kanal I, the president of the channel, Berk, discovers that İmdat has an uncanny ability to sense what program will yield the best ratings and what is likely to be panned by audiences, thus Berk begins milking İmdat's unique ability to score ratings. Soon İmdat finds himself replacing the president and leading the TV channel. He goes on to produce some truly tasteless and exploitative programs that enjoy massive ratings, eventually becoming part of the dirty media games himself.

== Cast ==
- Okan Bayülgen as İmdat
- Hakan Yılmaz as Berk
- Aslıhan Gürbüz as Nazlı
- Serhat Özcan as Atilla
- Erol Günaydın
- Rasim Öztekin
