= Haunted (2007 film) =

- Poster
- Musallat
- Directed by: Alper Mestçi
- Written by: Güray Ölgü; Alper Mestçi
- Produced by: Banu Akdeniz; Murat Toktamisoglu
- Starring: Burak Özçivit; Biğkem Karavus; Kurtulus Şakirağaoğlu
- Cinematography: Feza Caldiran
- Edited by: Alper Mestçi
- Music by: Resit Gözdamla
- Production companies: Dada Film; Mia Yapim
- Distributed by: Özen Film; Maxximum Film und Kunst GmbH
- Release date: 16 November 2007
- Running time: 90 minutes
- Country: Turkey
- Language: Turkish
- Budget: $1,500,000 (estimated)
- Box office: $2,170,188

Haunted (Turkish: Musallat) is a 2007 Turkish horror film directed by Alper Mestçi about a young Turkish guest-worker who is haunted by dark visions in Berlin. The film, which opened nationwide on November 16, 2007 was one of the highest-grossing Turkish films of 2007. A sequel, Musallat 2: Lanet, was released on December 2, 2011, and Third film, Musallat 3, was released on February 3, 2023.

== Production ==
The film was shot on location in Istanbul, Turkey and Berlin, Germany.

== Plot synopsis ==
Suat is a young Turkish man who leaves his new bride Nurcan behind in Turkey and joins his childhood friend Metin in Berlin where he can earn some money. Here he is haunted by dark visions that eventually drive him to attempt suicide. When the doctors in Germany can find nothing wrong, Suat and Metin return to Istanbul to seek the advice of spiritual healer Haci Burhan Kasavi. Suat and family of Haci except a daughter of Haci was killed by a demon angry about him for being killed when born as the baby of Nurcan. Musallat 2: Lanet (2011) by the same company is about a young woman find she is a relative of a jinn and being born after a couple asked a witch to ask for a child for a jinn through the cut animal legs sorcerery ritual.

== Casts ==
- Burak Özçivit as Suat
- Biğkem Karavus as Nurcan
- Kurtuluş Şakirağaoğlu as Haci Burhan Kasavi
- İbrahim Can as Metin

== Release ==
The film opened in 125 screens across Turkey on November 16, 2007 at number 3 in the box office chart with an opening weekend gross of $372,573.

Opening weekend gross
Date	Territory	Screens	Rank	Gross
November 16, 2007	Turkey	125	3	$372,573
February 7, 2008	Germany	23	24	$69,936
February 8, 2008	Austria	2	21	$11,999
February 27, 2008	Belgium	2	23	$18,878

== Reception ==
=== Box office ===
The film was the tenth highest grossing Turkish film of 2007 with a total gross of $1,802,504.

The worldwide total gross rose to $2,170,188 following international release in 2008.

=== Reviews ===
Todd Brown, writing for Twitch Film, claims to have been, drawn in by the simple but compelling story of a young family haunted and possessed, with, a pretty compelling blend of pulp with legitimate tension, which looks to ride that same split in influences, of technical proficiency and just plain pulp that has long been the mark of Turkish genre films, though the technical end looks stronger than most, with, truly moody and unsettling imagery. If the film comes close to living up to the trailer this thing is EASILY going to be the best Turkish genre picture of the past five to ten years, he concludes.

Chris Churchill, also writing for Twitch Film, adds that, The film also scored Theatrical releases in a few European countries earlier in the year, something quite rare for Turkish genre films in the past, so there could be something that makes Musallat stand out from the recent crop of Turkish Horror films produced.

== See also ==
- 2007 in film
- Turkish films of 2007
