= Gülhan Şen =

Turkish TV personality (born 1978)

- Born: July 16, 1978 (age 47); Shumen, People's Republic of Bulgaria
- Occupations: TV presenter; producer
- Spouse: Alper Mestçi (m. 2015)

Gülhan Şen (born July 16, 1978) is a -Bulgarian-Turkish television presenter, producer and speaker.

== Biography ==
Gülhan Şen was born in Shumen, Bulgaria and completed primary school there. In 1985, her name changed to Galina Hristova Mihaylova due to a compulsory name change law, and a compulsory immigration law applied to Turks brought her to Turkey in 1989.

Şen graduated from Muhsin Adil Binal Secondary School and Kabataş High School in Turkey, and studied radio and television at Istanbul University Communication Faculty. In London, Şen took courses on "Television News and Programs Preparation" at Reuters News Agency.

== Career ==
Şen worked at HBB, BRT, Star TV and CNN Türk. After directing Türk Sinemasi 2003 ("Turkish Cinema 2003") and Sis Bulutunun Ardında: Alzheimer ("Fog Clouds: Alzheimer"), she carried on her career by preparing, presenting and directing for the TV 8 Zamanın Ruhu: Zeitgeist ("Spirit of Time: Zeitgeist") programme. On 3 October 2007, her new programme Gülhan'ın Galaksi Rehberi ("Gülhan's Guide to the Galaxy"), a travel show primarily about travel abroad, began on TV 8.

== Productions ==
- Stardust (Star TV, 2002)
- Eğitim ve Kariyer ("Education and Career", CNN Türk, 2003)
- Zamanın Ruhu: Zeitgeist ("When Spirit: Zeitgeist", TV8, 2004–2007)
- Bayanlar Baylar ("Ladies and Gentlemen ", TV8, 2006)
- Gülhan'ın Galaksi Rehberi ("Gülhan's Guide to the Galaxy", TV8, later TRT Haber, 2007–)
- Pür Dikkat (TV8, 2009)
- Kanalizasyon (2009) – Presenter
- İşler Güçler (2012) – Deniz
