= Yaprak Dökümü =

1930 novel by Reşat Nuri Güntekin

- Author: Reşat Nuri Güntekin
- Published: 1930
- Media type: Print (hardback & paperback)
- Pages: 137 pp
- ISBN: 975-10-0135-8
- OCLC: 51945424

Yaprak Dökümü (The Fall of Leaves) is a novel by Turkish author and playwright Reşat Nuri Güntekin, written in 1930. It is available in an English translation by W. D. Halsey.

== Plot summary ==
The novel revolves around a middle-class Turkish family (the Tekins) in the 1930s. The main characters are Ali Riza Tekin (head of the Tekin family), his wife Hayriye, and their young daughters: Fikret (the oldest daughter), Leyla (the second daughter), Necla (the third daughter), Ayşe (their youngest daughter), their only son Şevket (who is between Fikret and Leyla), and his bride Ferhunde (who is also the principal antagonist).

== Adaptations ==
- In 1958, Yaprak Dökümü was made into a movie, starring Göksel Arsoy.
- In 1967, Yaprak Dökümü was made into a movie, starring Fatma Girik and Ediz Hun.
- It was made into a miniseries in 1988, starring Tarık Tarcan.
- Between 2006 and 2010, it was made into a TV series, starring Fahriye Evcen, Neslihan Atagül, Gökçe Bahadır, and Deniz Çakır.

== See also ==
- Turkish literature
- Reşat Nuri Güntekin
