= Güven Hokna =

Turkish actress (born 1946)

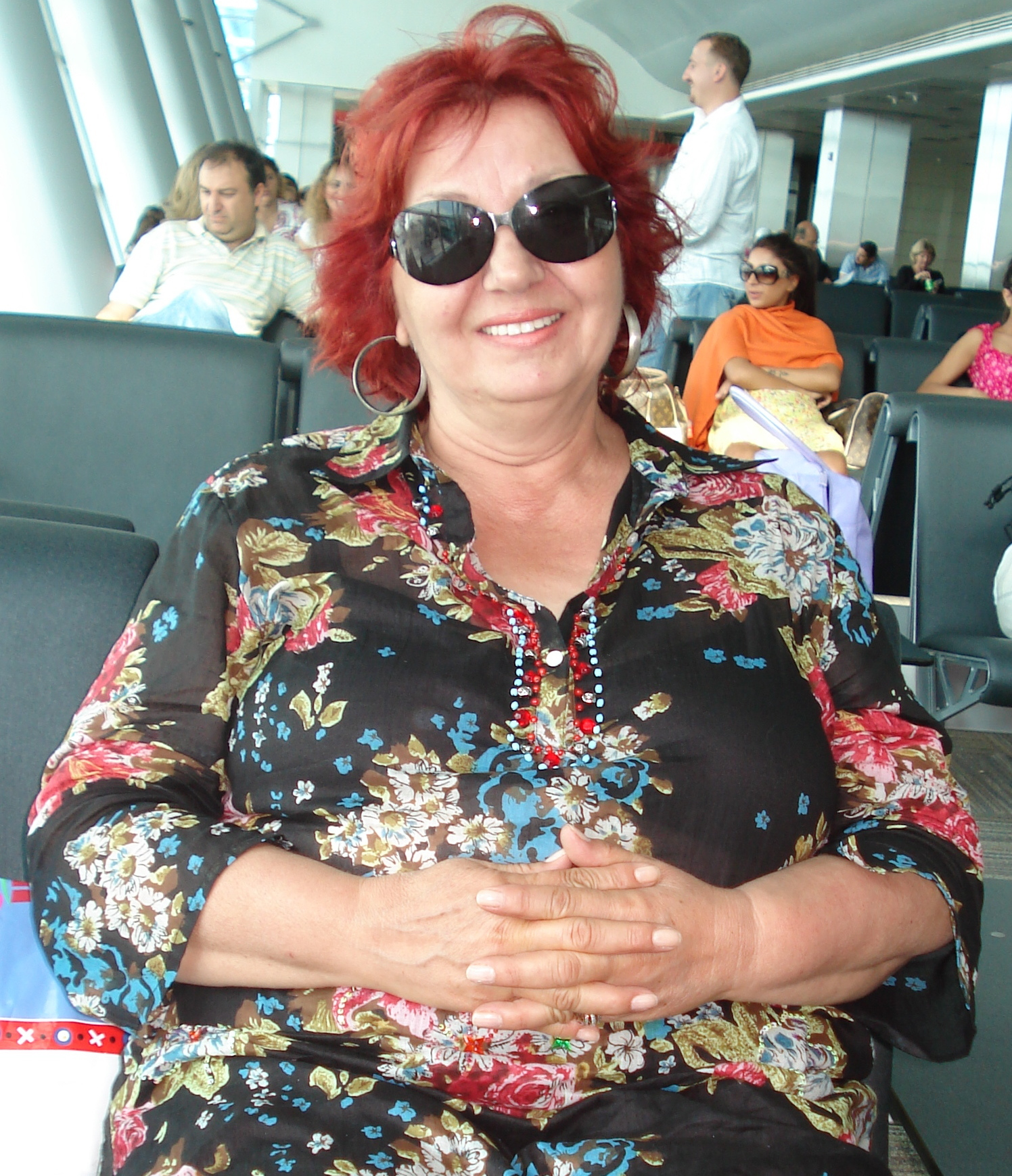
- Hokna in 2008
- Born: January 24, 1946 (age 80); Ankara, Turkey
- Occupation: Actress
- Years active: 1968–present

Güven Hokna (born January 24, 1946) is a Turkish actress. She is best known for her role as Hayriye Tekin in the TV series Yaprak Dökümü

== Life and career ==
Hokna was born in Ankara on January 24, 1946. Her mother, Avniye, was an Armenian, while her father came from a family of immigrants from Romania and Bulgaria.

Hokna graduated from the Ankara State Conservatory in 1967. In 1990, she presented a program for children, titled Susam Sokağı (Sesam Street), and worked in theater, film, and provided jobs for 35 years at the State Theater, and participated in many of the television business task. In 2002, she presented four works at the same time is: Ferhunde Hanımlar, İkinci Bahar, Zerda, Havada Bulut, Kumsaldaki İzler, Güz Sancısı, and portrayed one of the most famous roles in the series Valley of the Wolves in 2004. From 2006 to 2010, she appeared in the series Yaprak Dökümü.

In the 2019 Turkish local elections, she was nominated by the Democratic Left Party (DSP) as its candidate for mayor of Üsküdar, Istanbul.

== Filmography ==
Cinema
Year	Title	Role
1996	Eşkıya	Sevim
2006	Valley of the Wolves: Iraq	Nergis Karahanlı
2007	Ayak Altında	
2019	Aykut Enişte	
2022	Yıldızlara Bak	
2023	Cenazemize Hoşgeldiniz	
2023	Bursa Bülbülü	
Television
Year	Title	Role
1993–1999	Ferhunde Hanımlar	Suzi
1998-2001	İkinci Bahar	Neriman
2002	Kumsaldaki İzler	Nimet
2002-2003	Zerda	Sultan Ana
2003	Havada Bulut	Gülizar
2004	Avrupa Yakası	
2004–2005	Kurtlar Vadisi	Nergis Karahanlı
2006–2010	Yaprak Dökümü	Hayriye Tekin
2011	Sensiz Olmaz	Gülümser
2012-2014	Huzur Sokağı	Saadet
2015	Sen Benimsin	Bereket
2016-2017	Bana Sevmeyi Anlat	Zahide
2017–2018	Bahtiyar Ölmez	Latife
2019	Aykut Eniste	Muhtesem
2019–2021	Hercai	Şükran
