= Sijjin (film series) =

Series of Turkish supernatural films

- SİCCÎN
- Directed by: Alper Mestçi (1–7)
- Written by: Ersan Özer (1–2); Alper Mestçi (2, 4–7); Bekir Acar (3)
- Produced by: Muhtesem Tözüm (1–7)
- Starring: Aydan Cakir (1); Pınar Çağlar Gençtürk (1); Merve Ateş (1, 4–6); Adnan Koç (3, 6-7); Cem Uslu (3); Dilara Büyükbayraktar (6)
- Cinematography: Mustafa Kusçu (1); Feza Çaldiran (2); Serdar Armutlu (3); Erhan Makar (4); Mehmet Eren Nayir (5); Sami Saydan (6)
- Edited by: Efe Hizir (1); Okan Sarul (2–5); Cem Taskara (3)
- Music by: Ali Otyam (1); Resit Gözdamla (2–7); Sonay Akcen (4)
- Production company: Muhtesem Film (1–6)
- Distributed by: Pinema (1); The Moments Entertainment (3); TME Films (5); CinedeX (5–6)
- Running time: 671 minutes (1–7)
- Country: Turkey
- Language: Turkish
- Box office: Total (7 films): $5.716 million (Global)

Sijjin is a supernatural horror film series from Turkey debuted in 2014. The original title SİCCÎN Director Alper Mestçi returned to his horror works with this franchise after successfully making a pair of global box office hits. All the films are produced by Muhtesem Tözüm and were released under the banner of his Muhtesem Film studio. Right from the start, each of the films gained global acceptance and were quickly recognized as new wave of Turkish horror genre.

The title of this franchise is derived from the Arabic word Sijjin (سِجِّين) meaning either a book that lists the names of the damned or a prison, located in the bottom of hell. The word is derived from the word "Prison" (It appears in the Qur'an in Surah 83:7–9. A similar word (sijill) appears in 21:104 often translated as 'scroll'.

== Films ==
=== Originals ===
As of 2025, the franchise comprises seven installments. The latest installment has been released on 14 June 2024.

The films are all filmed in various regions of Turkey.

Siccîn (2014)

The first film was about Öznur, a beautiful woman who fell in love with a man known as Kudret, who is her cousin. When she learned that Kudret is lawfully married to another woman, Nisa, the jealous Öznur seeks help from a sorcerer to unleash black magic against Nisa, only to cause Kudret's family to go through inexplicable troubles. However, the sorcery also effects and torments Öznur.

Siccin 2 (2015)

The second film was about Hicran and Adnan, a happily married couple with their 1-year-old child. On the first birthday, Birol was squashed under a huge cupboard while Hicran was in the kitchen. Three months later, in the cemetery, Hicran was alone crying over her child’s grave. Then she spotted two women in black watching her. At home, Adnan accused her of being an irresponsible mother, and he will not be able to forgive her. Every day, Hicran washed the dead child’s clothes and dried them, as she thinks he is alive. A friend of Hicran has pity on her and tells her to meet Abdullah Hodjah, but she refuses. Hicran is troubled by the women who seemed to be evil, and she decided to go to Hodjah at once. Hodjah said that her son is in Heaven with the angels, and she has been trapped in a bad spell which has a link with her aunt. Hicran goes to her mother's house to enquire about her aunt. Hicran's mother narrates her that she had a sister whose husband was a gambler, and he had killed his daughters brutally. Hicran stays and tells her grandmother that she missed Birol so much. The next day, Hicran goes to the aunt's village to know more. Adnan killed himself in the loss of Birol at his grave. Inside the aunt's house, she found an old doll which she kept. Hicran went to her mother again and asked for the aunt's photographs. Hicran returns home and searches for Adnan but didn't find him. Worried, she goes to Adnan's workplace to meet him, but his colleague says that he had not come to work for a while. Hicran give Hodjah the old doll, inside which he finds a chit inside with an evil spell written on it. Hodjah said that there's someone who had summoned a demon to destroy her family.

To know the truth, Hicran went to her mother and found her grandmother sitting on the sofa. She revealed that Necmiye is jealous of her sister Zehra. Zehra is happy with her loving husband Ramazan and her two beautiful daughters - aged nine and four. Ramazan wants a son who can protect his daughters. When Necmiye found out, she told her sister that her mother-in-law can help them. The mother-in-law took a chit, put it in the doll and stitched it 41 times. She said they could rest assured. They were eager for it.

After some days, Ramazan murdered her daughters with an axe. Then he tried to kill Zehra while she was praying, but was unable to do so. He put diesel fuel on himself and burned himself in front of his wife. Zehra gave birth seven months later to Hicran with Necmiye and her mother-in-law helping her. Necmiye stole Hicran from her because she was sterile. Soon after delivering, Necmiye killed Zehra by suffocation. Hicran found Necmiye dead in her room from being possessed.

Hicran returned home, saw her husband, child and her aunt's family. The movie ends saying that Hicran stayed with her deceased husband and child for two months. Fifteen months later, Hodja broke the spell, Hicran remarried.

Siccin 3: Cürmü aşk (2016)

The third film was about Sudet and Orhan, two best friends who started a factory together. Sudet had a younger sister named Kader, whom Orhan was in love with and later marry, despite Orhan's parents' disagreement towards the marriage. One time, Orhan fired a worker named Halil, a chain smoker, for not following the rules. Later, Halil committed suicide by hanging himself at night. His wife, Ayse, came to the factory the next morning and curses Orhan, promising that his life will be as dark as the black soil in her hand. Just then, Sudet, Kader, and Sudet's son, Mehmet, had a car accident which caused Mehmet to become paraplegic and Kader to lose her memory, suffering from amnesia.

Ever since then, Orhan blamed Sudet for what happened and decided to take care of Kader in their house, even though Kader started being haunted by apparitions every time Orhan has to leave her for work. At the factory, Orhan refused to talk to Sudet. At their house, Mehmet began acting strange, making strange drawings, and talking to two unseen entities, who promised to pray to God for his recovery if Sudet is willing to 'help' them. At Orhan's parents' house, they are terrorized by the same entities, prompting Orhan to visit them and secretly put some protection amulets all over their house, only for his mother to throw them away once he had left, not knowing he put them and believing they are the cause of the haunting. As the result, the entities possessed Orhan's mother and caused her to bludgeoned her husband to death with a rock before bludgeoning herself.

After learning of their deaths, Sudet, not wanting to end up the same, goes to meet Abdullah Hodja for help. After analysing Sudet, Hodja told him that the entities are djinns and they wanted him to find Kader in Orhan's house. As soon as he arrived, Sudet sneaks inside and, while Orhan is distracted, goes to the root cellar, following Hodja's instruction. As Kader sees and follows him, he finds something covered in white sheet and uncovers it, only to discover Kader's rotting corpse inside. Just then, Kader's face turns demonic and one of the djinns appear as a humanoid creature, grabbing her from behind and dragging her into their world. It was then revealed that Kader had already died during the car accident due to Ayse's curse as she was unable to cope with Halil's death, and Orhan, unable to cope with Kader's death, dig her body from her grave and performed a ritual to bring her back. Instead, he had kidnapped a djinn and made her look like Kader, with no memories of her previous life. Angered by this, the djinn's parents started haunting Mehmet, asking for Sudet's help. They had also murdered Orhan's parents as revenge. It was the djinn's mother who appeared at the root cellar while the djinn's father had distracted Orhan by making him hallucinate seeing himself and his mother outside. Ever since then, Mehmet had miraculously recovered and is able to walk. However, Sudet never knew what happened to Orhan afterwards, as he had disappeared, with some people starting a rumour that he had committed suicide to join Kader in the afterlife. At the end of the film, Orhan, who is still alive, visits his wife's grave one last time, with Kader's spirit calling out to him from behind as the adhan can be heard in the background.

=== Remake ===
In 2023, Indonesian film producer Rapi Films, with SkyMedia and Legacy Pictures, announced an adaptation of Sijjin for release on 11 November 2023, as well as theatrical deals to Malaysia, Brunei, Singapore, and Cambodia.

The plot follows Irma's terror, falling in unrequited love with her own cousin Galang, a married father with great devotion. Obsessed with being the only woman Galang's life, she desires marriage, assistance for which she requests a shaman. The shaman accepts Irma's request, namely by sending black magic to Galang's wife in five severe night terrors: Possession, mystical disturbances, suicide attempts, and ultimately death. What Irma did not anticipate was herself being haunted.

== Awards ==
The third installment of the franchise, Sijjin 3: Crime of Love, was nominated for SIYAD Award by Turkish Film Critics Association in 2016. That same year, director Alper Mestçi was nominated for the Giovanni Scognamillo Award in the Best Fantastic Film category for the entry.
