= Mehmet Güler =

Mehmet Güler (born in 1944 in Malatya, Turkey) is a Turkish-German painter and graphic designer. He is one of the world's most renowned Turkish artists, although he has lived in Kassel, Germany, since 1977.

== Early life and education ==
Güler grew up in Anatolia and, after graduating from high school, studied painting and graphic arts at Gazi University in Ankara. He graduated in 1965 with a diploma in painting and graphic arts. After completing his compulsory military service and working as an art teacher and subsequently as a lecturer at Gazi University, he received a two-year scholarship from the Turkish Ministry of Education, which he spent in Kassel. In 1976, Güler earned his German diploma in painting and graphic arts from the Kassel School of Art and Design. After returning to Turkey, he resumed teaching at Gazi University. The increasing politicization of academia prompted him and his family to move to Kassel at the end of 1977, where he has lived and worked as a freelance artist ever since.

In his autobiography, "Vergangenheit in der Sonne" (Past in the Sun), published in German in 2019, Güler vividly describes his long and arduous journey from his Anatolian homeland to the world of art and painting.

== Career ==
=== Graphic work ===
Güler's early work stands out among his woodcuts, in which he primarily explores the lives of people in rural Turkey and which exhibit socially critical tendencies. These works, in which he often uses the structure of the wood as a fundamental element, are still figurative and depict people in their living and working conditions. In the course of his artistic development, figurative elements receded or were increasingly and consciously reduced, but are often still recognizable upon closer examination of his works. In 2007, the art magazine viewed Güler's work as a result of an East-West European tension.

=== Painting ===
In his paintings, Güler's main body of work, and in his color etchings, he found and continues to find his own mode of expression and formal language, in which the color fields condense and in which the colors seem to explode. His artistic success is also based on this "luminosity" of his paintings—the title of a major retrospective exhibition in Kassel in 2019. Frank Günter Zehnder explains:

With Mehmet Güler's paintings, one can hardly go wrong. They are unmistakable; his signature style is always clear and recognizable. His visual language, like all great oeuvres, has undergone transformations over the years in terms of content, form, and process, yet it has retained its fundamental tone, its style, and its immediate appeal. It possesses characteristics and basic principles that have remained consistent across decades, from his early woodcuts to his current oil paintings.

=== Sculptures ===
Since 2002, Mehmet Güler has also created sculptures.

Sculptures made of wood and metal, which art journalist Dirk Schwarze placed in the borderland between nature and sculpture.

== Exhibitions ==
Up to 2019, Güler had over 200 solo exhibitions, primarily in Germany and Turkey, but also in the US, Great Britain, Austria, Switzerland, and the Netherlands. He also participated in numerous group exhibitions and was invited to international biennials, triennials, and trade fairs. His works can be found in numerous public collections and those of public institutions.

In 2020, the art collection of the German Bundestag acquired Mehmet Güler's oil painting "Enjoying the Heat" (2019), which has been on display there ever since.
