= Çalıkuşu (TV series) =

2013 Turkish television series

- Genre: Romantic, Drama
- Based on: Çalıkuşu
- Written by: Sevgi Yılmaz
- Directed by: Çağan Irmak; Doğan Ümit Karaca
- Starring: Fahriye Evcen; Burak Özçivit; Begüm Kütük Yaşaroğlu; Deniz Celiloğlu; Mehmet Özgür; Elif İskender; Hande Soral
- Composer: Aytekin Ataş
- Country of origin: Turkey
- Original language: Turkish
- No. of seasons: 1
- No. of episodes: 30

Production
- Running time: 95–120 minutes
- Production company: Tims Productions

Original release
- Network: Kanal D
- Release: September 24, 2013 – May 17, 2014

Çalıkuşu (English: The Wren) is a 2013 Turkish romantic drama television series aired on Kanal D that is based on the novel of the same name for the fourth time. The series was cancelled before its completion.

== Plot ==
As a child, Feride, also known as Çalıkuşu for her childish behavior, loses her mother. Her father, a military officer, entrusts her to her maternal aunt, Besime, and her husband, Seyfettin. The couple starts raising her along with their own children, Kamran and Necmiye. When she is a teenager, Feride is informed that her father is killed in action.

Having become adults, Feride and Kamran still mess with each other, not knowing of their shared fate. Kamran has become a doctor working at a hospital. Necmiye falls in love with Selim, Kamran's friend and fellow doctor. Selim is instructed by Levent, his stepfather and an enemy of Seyfettin's family, to date Feride; the former quickly falls in love with her. He mistakes her for another woman diagnosed with a terminal illness. He informs her of the condition and offers a cure. Feride discovers that Kamran is secretly seeing a middle-aged widow Neriman, and threatens to tell her aunt and uncle unless Kamran agrees to pretend to date Feride.

Seyfettin gets infected with the plague, a near incurable disease at the time. Kamran manages to cure him with a blood transfusion, an illegitimate act. Seeing Kamran as a love rival, Selim reports the former's action to the local cleric. Kamran escapes, but is later captured and sentenced to death. The cleric pardons him when his own son is infected with the plague and he is forced to accept transfusion. Meanwhile, Feride realizes that she is healthy while Selim tries to poison her to prove she is sick. Necmiye finds out his plan after eating a poisoned fondant herself, becoming ill, and then giving the rest to their chickens, which are killed. She then confronts Selim in her room. Kamran enters and mistakes it for a sexual relationship between the two, and ends his friendship with Selim. Kamran forces Selim to court and marry Necmiye, which is accepted by the family. Kamran and Feride are revealed to have fallen in love.

Selim kidnaps Feride. Kamran and Yusuf, a servant, manage to find her and capture Selim, who escapes and returns to see Feride, but is killed by Necmiye. Kamran takes the blame and Feride sells the mansion to a rich woman named Azelia in order to pay the blood money. Levent is sentenced to death for his schemes. As Kamran and Feride prepare to get married, Neriman reveals to him that she is pregnant by him. Seyfettin marries her in order to keep her away from Kamran, who finally decides to tell Feride. She leaves because she doesn't want another child to be orphaned like herself. Kamran has a one-night stand with Azelia when he is drunk. Seyfettin divorces Neriman. It is revealed that the baby is not Kamran's. Kamran buys back the family mansion. He and Feride decide to reunite and get married. On the wedding night, Neriman reveals to Feride what happened between Kamran and Azelia. Feride leaves and adopts an orphan intended to remind her of the love.

After months of searching, Kamran finds the duo in an inn and tells Feride to meet him at the train station the next day to return home with him so they can be a family again. Kamran waits for Feride at the station, the train arrives and Kamran smiles, implying their return.

== Cast ==
- Fahriye Evcen – Feride
- Burak Özçivit – Kamran
- Begüm Kütük Yaşaroğlu – Neriman
- Deniz Celiloğlu – Selim
- Mehmet Özgür – Seyfettin
- Elif İskender – Besime
- Hande Soral – Azelya
- Ebru Helvacıoğlu – Necmiye
