= Tempo (Turkish magazine) =

Tempo was a monthly lifestyle published in Istanbul, Turkey. The magazine was established on 6 December 1987. The founder was Mehmet Y. Yılmaz, a Turkish journalist. It featured politics, life, health, society, and entertainment. The magazine was owned and published by Doğan Media Group. It was published on a weekly basis until 2009 when its frequency was changed to monthly. The same year it was also redesigned as a lifestyle magazine.

Regular contributors included Umberto Eco, Murat Belge and Susan Miller. In late 2016 Tempo ceased publication due to financial reasons.
