= Çalıkuşu =

1922 novel by Reşat Nuri Güntekin

- Author: Reşat Nuri Güntekin
- Publication date: 1922
- Media type: Print (Hardback & Paperback)
- Pages: 408 pp
- ISBN: 975-10-0012-2
- OCLC: 55020530
- LC Class: MLCSN 96/1774 PL248.G8

Çalıkuşu, or The Wren, is a novel by Reşat Nuri Güntekin written in 1922, about the destiny of a young Turkish female teacher named Feride.

The novel originally appeared as a serialized story in the newspaper "Vakit" before being published as a book.

The novel was inspired by the village of Zeyneller, Gerede. In 2013, the village undertook several tourism initiatives to draw in tourism and keep the memory of the novel alive.

== Plot summary ==
The events in the novel take place in the early twentieth century, near the collapse of a war weary Ottoman Empire and the creation of the Turkish republic. Most of the novel is recounted in first-person diary format by Feride. In the first section, Feride describes her childhood from the beginning up until the events that led her to a strange hotel room. The second and largest section consists of diary entries describing her adventures in Anatolia. The third section is the only one written from the third person point of view, describing Feride's visit to her home.

Feride is the orphaned daughter of an army officer. As a teenager, she attends Lycee Notre Dame de Sion in the winter, and stays with one of her late mother's sisters during the summer holidays. She is given the nickname "the Wren" during her time at school for her vivacity and mischief. These two characteristics considered unusual and even a bit inappropriate for Muslim girls at that time.

She gets engaged to her charming cousin, Kamran, whom she leaves the night before their wedding, upon discovering that he has been unfaithful to her. She runs away from home to become a teacher in Anatolia, although she remains desperately in love with Kamran. She is forced to move from town to town several times during her first three years as a teacher, as a result of the incompetence of officials, the malice of colleagues and the unwanted attention she gets from men because of her beauty and her lively manner.

Meanwhile, she adopts a little girl called Munise, finds out that Kamran has married the woman he had cheated on Feride with, and develops a friendship with Hayrullah Bey, an elderly military doctor who treats Feride with fatherly affection. At the end of these three years, Munise dies and Feride is forced to resign from her post and marry the doctor because of the rumors about her "indecent behavior".

A couple of years later, Feride returns to Tekirdag to visit one of her aunts and her cousin Mujgan, where Kamran, now widowed and with a small child, also happens to be. He has never gotten over Feride, painfully regrets having cheated on her, and confesses to have married the other woman only out of pity after he heard false rumors about Feride being in love with another man. The night before her arranged departure, Feride confesses to Mujgan that her marriage to the doctor has never been consummated and he has in fact died recently.

He told Feride to revive her ties to her family as his last wish, and gave her a package to be entrusted to Mujgan. Mujgan takes the package to Kamran, which turns out to be Feride's diary which was hidden and preserved by the doctor. Finding out that Feride is still in love with him, Kamran arranges to be wedded to Feride the next day without her knowledge. The novel ends with their long-awaited reunion, and Kamran's confession that he betrayed her all those years ago because of his insecurity about her love for and loyalty to him, due to her ostensible frivolity and harsh treatment of him.

== Translations ==
This book was translated into English as The Autobiography Of A Turkish Girl by Sir Wyndham Deedes, although this version of the book is incomplete (omitting the book's third section). In 2018, a complete translation Çalikuşu (the Wren) - The Complete English Translation was published. It combines Deedes' translation of the first four parts with the final fifth part translated by Tugrul Zure and edited by Angel Garcia.

== Adaptations ==
- In 1966, Çalıkuşu was made into a movie (150 minutes), starring Türkan Şoray, Kartal Tibet
- It was made into a TV series in 1986, starring Aydan Şener, Kenan Kalav
- in 2005, it was adapted into Yeniden Çalıkuşu a TV series taking place in contemporary Istanbul instead of the novel's begin 20th-century setting. It was cancelled.
- In 2013, it was adapted into yet another TV series, however, it too was cancelled before completion, finishing before Feride became a teacher.
- It has been adapted to theater and ballet several times.

== See also ==
- Turkish literature
- Reşat Nuri Güntekin
