= Reşat Nuri Güntekin =

Turkish novelist, storywriter and playwright (1889–1956)

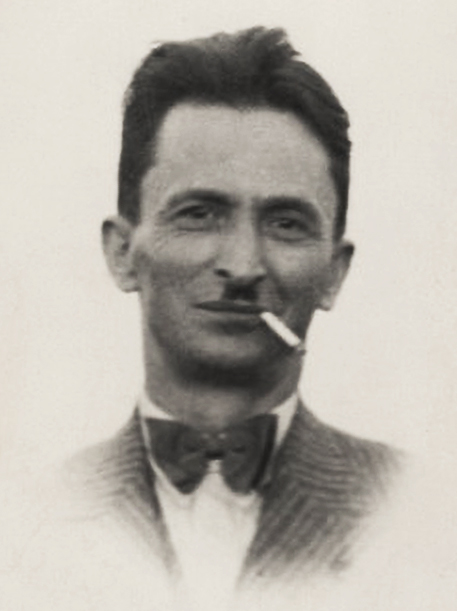
- Born: November 25, 1889; Istanbul, Ottoman Empire
- Died: December 7, 1956 (aged 67); London, United Kingdom
- Occupations: Novelist, story writer, playwright
- Writing career
- Notable works: Çalıkuşu (1922), Yeşil Gece (1928), Yaprak Dökümü (1930)

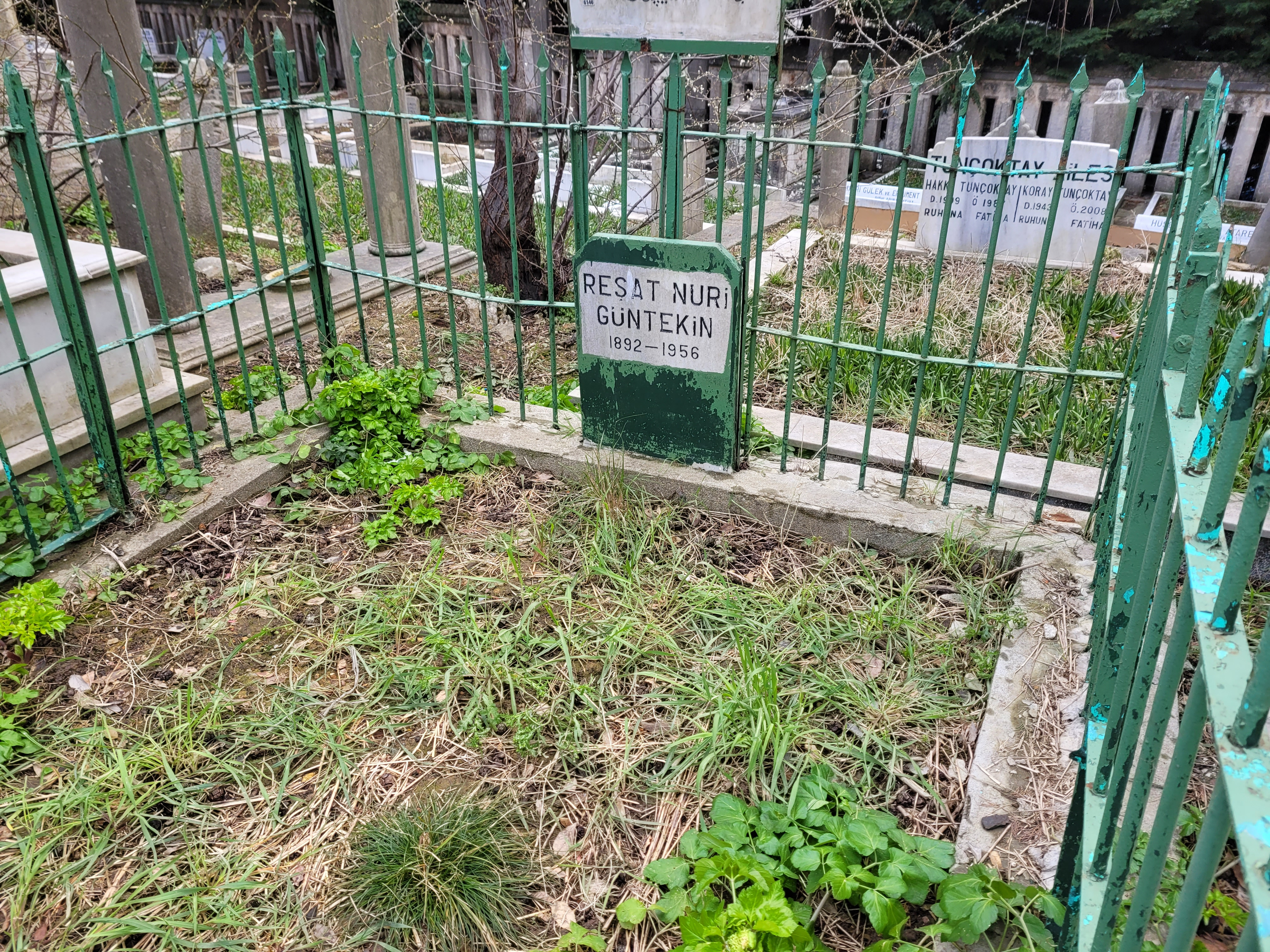
Grave of Reşat Nuri Güntekin in Karacaahmet Cemetery

Reşat Nuri Güntekin (Turkish pronunciation: [ɾeˈʃat nuːˈɾi ɟynteˈcin]) (25 November 1889 – 7 December 1956) was a Turkish novelist, storywriter, and playwright. His best known novel, Çalıkuşu ("The Wren", 1922), is about the destiny of a young Turkish female teacher in Anatolia. This work is translated into Persian by Seyyed Borhan Ghandili. His other significant novels include Dudaktan Kalbe ("From the Lips to the Heart", 1925), and Yaprak Dökümü ("The Fall of Leaves", 1930). Many of his novels have been adapted to cinema and television. Because he visited Anatolia during his duty as an inspector, he knew Anatolian people closely. In his works he dealt with the life and social problems in Anatolia, focusing on the human-environment relationship.

== Biography ==
His father, Doktor Nuri Bey, was a medical doctor . Reşat Nuri attended primary school in Çanakkale, the Çanakkale Secondary School and the İzmir School of Freres. He graduated from Istanbul University, Faculty of Literature in 1912. He worked as a teacher and administrator at high schools in Bursa and Istanbul, he taught literature, French and philosophy; then he worked as an inspector at the Ministry of National Education (1931). He served as the deputy of Çanakkale between 1933 and 1943 in the Turkish Parliament, the chief inspector at the Ministry of National Education (1947), and a cultural attaché to Paris (1950), when he was also the Turkish representative to UNESCO.

After his retirement, he served at the literary board of the Istanbul Municipal Theatres. Reşat Nuri Güntekin died in London, where he had gone to be treated for his lung cancer. He is buried at the Karacaahmet Cemetery in Istanbul.

== Works ==
=== Stories ===
- Recm, Gençlik ve Güzellik (1919)
- Roçild Bey (1919)
- Eski Ahbab (Without known time)
- Tanrı Misafiri (1927)
- Sönmüş Yıldızlar (1928)
- Leylâ ile Mecnun (1928)
- Olağan İşler (1930)

=== Novels ===
- Çalıkuşu (1922) (The Wren - translated as: "The Autobiography of a Turkish Girl")
- Gizli El (1924)
- Damga (1924)
- Dudaktan Kalbe (1923) (From the Lip to the Heart)
- Akşam Güneşi (1926) (Afternoon Sun)
- Bir Kadın Düşmanı (1927)
- Yeşil Gece (1928) (The Green Night)
- Acımak (1928) (To Pity)
- Yaprak Dökümü (1930) (The Fall of Leaves)
- Eski Hastalık (1938) (That Old Sickness)
- Değirmen (1944) (The Mill)
- Kızılcık Dalları (1944)
- Miskinler Tekkesi (1946)
- Harabelerin Çiçeği (1953)
- Kavak Yelleri (1961)
- Son Sığınak (1961) (The Last Shelter)
- Kan Davası (1962)
- Ateş Gecesi (1953) (The Night of Fire)

=== Theatre ===
- Babür Şahın Seccadesi (1919) (Babür Şah's Prayer Rug)
- Hançer (1920)
- Eski Rüya (1922) (The Old Dream)
- Ümidin Güneşi (1924) (Hope's Sun)
- Gazeteci Düşmanı, Şemsiye Hırsızı (The Umbrella Thief), İhtiyar Serseri (1925, three works)
- Taş Parçası (1926)
- Bir Köy Hocası (1928)
- Ümit Mektebinde (1931) (In the School of Hope)
- Felaket Karşısında, Gözdağı, Eski Borç (1931) (Against Disaster, Intimidation, Old Debt)
- İstiklâl (1933) (Independence)
- Hülleci (1933)
- Vergi Hırsızı(1933) (Tax Thief)
- Bir Yağmur Gecesi (1941) (A Rainy Night)
- Yaprak Dökümü (1971)
- Eski Şarkı(1971) (The Old Song)
- Balıkesir Muhasebecisi (1971) (The Accountant Of Balıkesir)
- Tanrıdağı Ziyafeti (1971)

== See also ==
- List of Turkish diplomats
