= List of Turkish films of the 2000s =

A list of films produced in Turkey in the 2000s:

== 2000s ==
| Title | Director | Cast | Genre | Notes |
|---|---|---|---|---|
2000
| Balalayka | Ali Özgentürk | Uğur Yücel, Cem Davran | Drama | 4 wins |
| Dar Alanda Kısa Paslaşmalar | Serdar Akar | Müjde Ar | | 4 wins |
| Fasulye | Bora Tekay | Selim Erdoğan, Elvin Beşikcioglu, Bülent Kayabaş, Burak Sergen | Comedy, Crime | |
| Güle Güle | Zeki Ökten | Zeki Alasya, Yıldız Kenter, Eşref Kolçak, Metin Akpınar | Drama, Comedy, Romance | |
| Kahpe Bizans | Gani Müjde | Mehmet Ali Erbil, Cem Davran | Comedy | |
| Ölüm Peşimizde | Mahir Akyol | | Action | |
2001
| Bana Şans Dile | Çağan Irmak | | Action | |
| Bu film bitmez | Rafet El Roman | | Comedy | |
| Büyük adam küçük aşk | Handan İpekçi | Şükran Güngör | Drama | 9 wins & 2 nominations |
| Dansöz | Savaş Ay | Çolpan İlhan, Savaş Ay, Kerem Alışık | Drama | |
| Filler ve Çimen | Derviş Zaim | | Drama, Thriller | 6 wins & 1nomination |
| Hemşo | Ömer Uğur | Okan Bayülgen, Mehmet Ali Erbil | | |
| Herkes Kendi Evinde | Semih Kaplanoğlu | | Drama | 6 wins & 1 nomination |
| Komser Şekspir | Sinan Çetin | Okan Bayülgen, Kadir İnanır | Drama | |
| O da beni seviyor | Barış Pirhasan | Lale Mansur | Drama | |
| Oyunbozan | Nesli Çölgeçen | Zeki Alasya, Okan Bayülgen | Comedy, Crime, Drama | |
| Şellale | Semir Aslanyürek | Hülya Koçyiğit, Nurgül Yeşilçay | Comedy, Drama | |
| Vizontele | Yılmaz Erdoğan | Yılmaz Erdoğan, Demet Akbağ, Altan Erkekli, Cem Yılmaz | Comedy, Drama | |
| Yazgı | Zeki Demirkubuz | | Drama | Based on novel, Albert Camus / 4 wins, screened at Cannes |
2002
| Banka | Sinan Çetin | | | |
| Dokuz | Ümit Ünal | Ali Poyrazoğlu | Crime, Mystery, Drama, Thriller | |
| Güz Sancısı | Tomris Giritlioğlu | | Drama | |
| İçerideki | Ahmet Küçükkayalı | | | |
| İtiraf | Zeki Demirkubuz | Başak Köklükaya, Taner Birsel | | Screened at the 2002 Cannes Film Festival |
| Karşılaşma | Ömer Kavur | | Drama, Family | |
| Maruf | Serdar Akar | Meltem Cumbul | Drama | |
| Mumya Firarda | Erdal Murat Aktaş | | Action, Adventure, Comedy | |
| Sır Çocukları | Ümit Cin Güven, Aydın Sayman | Mehmet Ali Alabora | Drama | |
| Son | Levent Kırca | Levent Kırca, Oya Başar | Comedy, Drama | |
| Uzak | Nuri Bilge Ceylan | | Drama | Entered into the 2003 Cannes Film Festival |
| Yeşil Işık | Faruk Aksoy | | Romance, Drama, Fantasy | |
2003
| Abdülhamit Düşerken | Ziya Öztan | | Drama | |
| Asmalı Konak: Hayat | Abdullah Oğuz | | Drama | |
| Çamur | Derviş Zaim | | | |
| Giz | Ulaş Ak | | | |
| Gülüm | Zeki Ökten | Tarık Akan, Rutkay Aziz | Drama | |
| İnşaat | Ömer Vargı, Tolgay Ziyal | Emre Kınay, Şevket Çoruh | Comedy, Crime, Drama, Thriller | |
| Metropol Kabusu | Umut Cin Güven | | Drama | |
| Ömerçip | Zeki Alasya | | Comedy | |
| O şimdi asker | Mustafa Altıoklar | | Comedy | |
| Rus Gelin | Zeki Alasya | | Comedy, Drama | |
2004
| Bekleme Odası | Zeki Demirkubuz | | Drama | |
| Büyü | Orhan Oğuz | Özgü Namal | Horror, Thriller | |
| G.O.R.A. | Ömer Faruk Sorak | Cem Yılmaz | Adventure, Comedy, Sci-Fi | Writer: Cem Yılmaz |
| Hababam Sınıfı Merhaba | Kartal Tibet | | Drama, Comedy | |
| Karpuz kabuğundan gemiler yapmak | Ahmet Uluçay | | Drama, Comedy, Family, Romance | 7 wins & 1 nomination |
| Korkuyorum Anne | Reha Erdem | | Comedy | |
| Mustafa Hakkında Herşey | Çağan Irmak | Başak Köklükaya, Nejat İşler, Fikret Kuşkan | Drama, Thriller | |
| Neredesin Firuze | Ezel Akay | Haluk Bilginer, Demet Akbağ, Özcan Deniz | Comedy | |
| Okul | Durul Taylan, Yağmur Taylan | Melisa Sözen | Horror | |
| Teberik Şanssız | Tunç Başaran | | Comedy | |
| Vizontele Tuuba | Yılmaz Erdoğan | Yılmaz Erdoğan, Tuba Ünsal, Tarık Akan | Comedy, Drama | |
| Yazı Tura | Uğur Yücel | Kenan İmirzalıoğlu | Drama | |
2005
| Anlat İstanbul (Istanbul Tales) | Ümit Ünal, Selim Demirdelen, Kudret Sabancı, Ömür Atay, Yücel Yolcu | | Drama | |
| Ayın Karanlık Yüzü | Biket İlhan | | Romance | |
| Babam ve Oğlum | Çağan Irmak | Fikret Kuşkan, Çetin Tekindor, Hümeyra | Drama, Comedy | |
| Balans ve Manevra | Teoman | Teoman, Berna Öztürk | Drama | |
| Banyo | Mustafa Altıoklar | Demet Evgar, Arda Kural, Sermiyan Midyat | | |
| Crossing the Bridge: The Sound of Istanbul | Fatih Akın | | | Screened at the 2005 Cannes Film Festival |
| Eğreti Gelin | Atıf Yılmaz | Nurgül Yeşilçay | Comedy, Drama | |
| Gönül Yarası | Yavuz Turgul | Şener Şen, Meltem Cumbul | Drama | |
| Hababam Sınıfı 3.5 | Ferdi Eğilmez | | Comedy | |
| Hırsız var | Oğuzhan Tercan | Haluk Bilginer, Mehmet Ali Erbil | Adventure, Comedy, Crime | |
| İki Genç Kız | Kutluğ Ataman | | | |
| Kalbin Zamanı | Ali Özgentürk | | Romance | |
| Meleğin Düşüşü | Semih Kaplanoğlu | | Drama | 10 wins |
| Organize İşler | Yılmaz Erdoğan | | Comedy | |
| O Şimdi Mahkum | Abdullah Oğuz | | Crime, Comedy | |
| Pardon | Mert Baykal | Ferhan Şensoy | Comedy, Drama | Writer: Ferhan Şensoy |
| Sen ne dilersen | Cem Başeskioğlu | | Drama | |
| Şans Kapıyı Kırınca | Tayfun Güneyer | Ferhan Şensoy, Zeki Alasya | Comedy | |
2006
| 2 Süper Film Birden | Murat Şeker | | Comedy, Drama | |
| Anne ya da Leyla | Mesut Uçakan | | Drama | |
| Ankara Cinayeti | Durul Taylan, Yağmur Taylan | Tarık Akan, Mehmet Aslantuğ, Zuhal Olcay | | |
| Beyza'nın Kadınları | Mustafa Altıoklar | Demet Evgar, Tamer Karadağlı, Levent Üzümcü | Crime, Action, Thriller | |
| Beş Vakit | Reha Erdem | | Drama | |
| Beynelmilel | Muharrem Gülmez, Sırrı Süreyya Önder | Cezmi Baskın, Özgü Namal | Comedy, Drama | Entered into the 29th Moscow International Film Festival |
| Cenneti Beklerken | Derviş Zaim | Serhan Tutumluer, Melisa Sözen | Drama | 2 wins & 1 nomination |
| Çinliler geliyor | Zeki Ökten | | Comedy | 1 nomination |
| Dün Gece Bi Rüya Gördüm | Ulaş Ak | | | |
| Dünyayı Kurtaran Adam'ın Oğlu | Kartal Tibet | Cüneyt Arkın, Mehmet Ali Erbil | Action, Comedy, Sci-Fi | |
| Eve Giden Yol 1914 | Semir Aslanyürek | Metin Akpınar, Melisa Sözen | | |
| Eve Dönüş | Ömer Uğur | Sibel Kekilli, Mehmet Ali Alabora | | 2 wins & 1 nomination |
| Gen | Togan Gökbakar | | Horror | |
| Hababam sınıfı Askerde | Ferdi Eğilmez | | Comedy | |
| Hacivat Karagöz Neden Öldürüldü | Ezel Akay | Haluk Bilginer, Beyazıt Öztürk | | |
| Hayatımın Kadınısın | Uğur Yücel | Türkan Şoray, Uğur Yücel | Romance | |
| Hokkabaz (The Magician) | Ali Taner Baltacı, Cem Yılmaz | Cem Yılmaz, Mazhar Alanson | Comedy, Drama | |
| İklimler (Climates) | Nuri Bilge Ceylan | Nuri Bilge Ceylan | Drama | 7 wins & 2 nominations, entered at Cannes |
| İlk Aşk | Nihat Durak | Çetin Tekindor, Vahide Gördüm, Tarık Pabuççuoğlu | | |
| Kader | Zeki Demirkubuz | Vildan Atasever | Drama | 9 wins & 1 nomination |
| Keloğlan Kara Prens'e Karşı | Tayfun Güneyer | Mehmet Ali Erbil, Petek Dinçöz, Özcan Deniz | | |
| Kısık Ateşte 15 Dakika | Neco Çelik | Metin Akpınar, Haluk Bilginer | | |
| Kurtlar Vadisi Irak (Valley of the Wolves Iraq) | Serdar Akar | Necati Şaşmaz | Action, Adventure | |
| Küçük Kıyamet | Durul Taylan, Yağmur Taylan | Başak Köklükaya, Cansel Elçin | Drama, Horror, Fantasy | |
| Maskeli Beşler İntikam Peşinde | Murat Aslan | Mehmet Ali Alabora, Peker Açıkalın | Comedy | |
| Sınav | Ömer Faruk Sorak | | | |
| Takva (A Man's Fear of God) | Özer Kızıltan | Erkan Can | Drama | 18 wins & 2 nominations |
| Unutulmayanlar | Ayhan Sonyürek | Altan Erkekli | Comedy, Drama | |
2007
| Adem'in Trenleri | Barış Pirhasan | | | |
| Amerikalılar Karadeniz'de 2 | Kartal Tibet | Metin Akpınar, Peker Açıkalın, Kadir Çöpdemir | Comedy | |
| Anka Kuşu | Mesut Uçakan | | | |
| Ara | Ümit Ünal | Erdem Akakçe, Betül Çobanoğlu, Serhat Tutumluer, Selen Uçer | Drama | 2 wins |
| Avrupalı | Ulaş Ak | Cem Davran | Comedy | |
| Barda | Serdar Akar | Nejat İşler | Crime, Drama | 1 nomination |
| Bir İhtimal Daha Var | Uğur Uludağ | | Comedy, Drama, Romance | |
| Beyaz Melek | Mahsun Kırmızıgül | | Drama | |
| Cumhurbaşkanı Öteki Türkiye'de | Zeki Alasya | | Comedy | |
| Çılgın dersane | Faruk Aksoy | | Comedy | |
| Emret Komutanım: Şah Mat | Taner Akvardar, Mustafa Altıoklar | | Action, Adventure, Comedy | |
| Gomeda | Tan Tolga Demirci | | Fantasy, Horror, Thriller | |
| Janjan | Aydın Sayman | Berk Hakman | Drama | |
| Kabadayı | AÖmer Vargı | Şener Şen, Kenan İmirzalıoğlu | Action, Crime, Drama | |
| Kutsal Damacana | Kamil Aydın, Ahmet Yılmaz | | Comedy | |
| Maskeli Beşler: Irak | Murat Aslan | | Adventure, Comedy | |
| Mavi Gözlü Dev | Biket İlhan | | Drama | |
| Musallat | Alper Mestçi | | Horror | |
| Mutluluk | Abdullah Oğuz | Özgü Namal | | |
| Pars: Kiraz Operasyonu | Osman Sınav | | Action, Crime, Thriller | |
| Polis | Onur Ünlü | Haluk Bilginer, Özgü Namal | | |
| Romantik | Sinan Çetin | | | |
| Saklı Yüzler | Handan İpekçi | Berk Hakman | Drama | |
| Sıfır Dediğimde | Gökhan Yorgancıgil | Oktay Kaynarca, Hazım Körmükçü, Damla Tokel, Görkem Yeltan, Özge Özder, Semih Sergen, Rıza Pekkutsat, Aykut Bilgin | Drama, Mystery, Thriller | Writer: Gökhan Yorgancıgil / 4 Official Selections & 2 Special Juri Awards |
| Sis ve Gece | Turgut Yasalar | Uğur Polat Selma Ergeç | Adventure, Thriller | 2 wins & 1 nomination |
| Sözün Bittiği Yer | İsmail Güneş | | Drama | |
| Umut Adası | Mustafa Kara | | Adventure, Drama, Thriller | |
| Yumurta (Egg) | Semih Kaplanoğlu | Nejat İşler, Saadet Aksoy | Drama | 8 wins |
2008
| 120 | Özhan Eren, Murat Saraçoğlu | Cansel Elçin, Özge Özberk, Burak Sergen | Drama, History, War | |
| A.R.O.G | Ali Taner Baltacı | Cem Yılmaz, Özge Özberk, Zafer Algöz, Nil Karaibrahimgil, Ozan Güven, Özkan Uğur | Comedy | |
| Çocuk | Onur Ünlü | | Adventure, Comedy, Family, Fantasy | |
| Çılgın Dersane Kampta | Faruk Aksoy | | Comedy | |
| Hayattan Korkma | Berrin Dağçınar | Zeki Alasya | Drama | |
| Issız Adam | Çağan Irmak | Cemal Hünal, Melis Birkan | Drama, Romance | |
| Kiralık oda | Murat Ergun, Atilla Özdemir | Mehmet Ali Alabora | Action, Crime, Thriller | |
| Maskeli beşler Kıbrıs | Murat Aslan | | Comedy | |
| Orospu Çocukları | Murat Saraçoğlu | Özgü Namal, Demet Akbağ | | |
| Plajda | Murat Seker | | Comedy | |
| Recep İvedik | Togan Gökbakar | Şahan Gökbakar | Comedy | |
| Ulak | Çağan Irmak | | | |
| Üç Maymun | Nuri Bilge Ceylan | Yavuz Bingol, Hatice Aslan, Rifat Sungar | Drama | 1 win & 1 nomination |
2009
| Güneşi Gördüm | Mahsun Kırmızıgül | Mahsun Kırmızıgül, Altan Erkekli | Drama | |
| Kirpi | Onur Ünlü | | Action, Comedy, Fantasy | |
| Osmanlı Cumhuriyeti | Gani Müjde | Ata Demirer, Sümer Tilmaç | Historical, Comedy, Drama | |
| Muro: Nalet Olsun İçimdeki İnsan Sevgisine | Zübeyr Şaşmaz | Mustafa Üstündağ | Comedy | |
| A.R.O.G | Cem Yılmaz | Cem Yılmaz, Özkan Uğur, Hasan Kaçan, Ozan Güven | Comedy | |
| Recep İvedik 2 | Togan Gökbakar | Şahan Gökbakar | Comedy | |
| Kadri'nin Götürdüğü Yere Git | Murat Aslan | | Comedy | |
| Her Şeyin Bittiği Yerden | Ezel Akay | | Drama | |
| Sonbahar | Özcan Alper | | Drama | |
| Karanlıktakiler | Çağan Irmak | Meral Çetinkaya, Erdem Akakçe, Derya Alabora | Drama | |
| Kanımdaki Barut | Haluk Piyes | Haluk Piyes, Jülide Kural | Drama | |
| Kaptan Feza | Ümit Ünal | Hakan Karahan, Mustafa Uzunyılmaz | Drama, Action | |
| En Mutlu Olduğum Yer | Kağan Erturan | Ezgi Asaroğlu, Nihat Altınkaya | Action | |
| Bornova Bornova | İnal Temelkuran | Öner Erkan, Kadir Çermik | Drama | |
| Kıskanmak | Zeki Demirkubuz | Nergis Öztürk, Serhat Tutumluer, Berrak Tüzünataç | Drama | |
| Türkler Çıldırmış Olmalı | Murat Aslan | Peker Açıkalın, Erdal Tosun, Burhan Öçal | Comedy | |
| Uzak İhtimal | Mahmut Fazıl Coşkun | Nadir Sarıbacak, Görkem Yeltan | Drama | |
| İki Dil Bir Bavul | Orhan Eskiköy | | Drama | |
| Melekler ve Kumarbazlar | Ertekin Akpınar | Cem Davran, İrem Altuğ, Hakan Gerçek, Ayça Bingöl | Drama | |
| Sizi Seviyorum | Mustafa Uğur Yağcıoğlu | Emre Altuğ, Durul Bazan, Irmak Ünal, Zeynep Beşerler | Romantic Comedy | |
| Kanalizasyon | Alper Mestçi | Okan Bayülgen, Hakan Yılmaz | Comedy | |
| Nefes: Vatan Sağolsun | Levent Semerci | Mete Horozoğlu, Birce Akalay | Drama, War | |
| Kolpaçino | Şafak Sezer | Şafak Sezer, Aydemir Akbaş, Ali Çatalbaş | Macera, Aksiyon, Comedy | |
| Neşeli Hayat | Yılmaz Erdoğan | Yılmaz Erdoğan, Ersin Korkut, Büşra Pekin | Comedy | |
| Kurtlar Vadisi Gladio | Zübeyr Şaşmaz | | Crime, Action | |
| Dabbe 2 | Hasan Karacadağ | Sefa Zengin, İncinur Daşdemir | Horror | |
| Aşk Geliyorum Demez | Murat Şeker | Tolgahan Sayışman, Bergüzar Korel | Romantic Comedy | |
| Hatay'da Bir Masal | Ali Haydar Güleç | Burak Yetim, Murat Özbey | Science fi. | |
| 7 Kocalı Hürmüz | Ezel Akay | Nurgül Yeşilçay, Mehmet Ali Alabora | History, Love | |
| Abimm | Şafak Bal | Mustafa Üstündağ, Levent Üzümcü | Comedy, Drama | |
