= Mazhar Alanson =

Turkish musician and actor (born 1950)

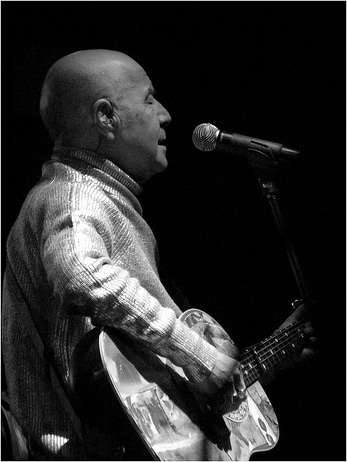
Mazhar Alanson

Mahmut Mazhar Alanson (born February 13, 1950) is a Turkish musician, guitarist, member of the popular Turkish pop music band MFÖ, and an actor.

== Early life ==
He was born on February 13, 1950, to a family of musicians in Ankara, Turkey, where his father was the head trumpeter in the State Philharmonic Orchestra. He attended Kadıköy Anadolu Lisesi, commonly known as Kadıköy Maarif College for his high school education in Istanbul following his father's death. After high school, he attended the State Conservatory in Ankara and graduated in performing arts, in particular (theater).

== Career ==
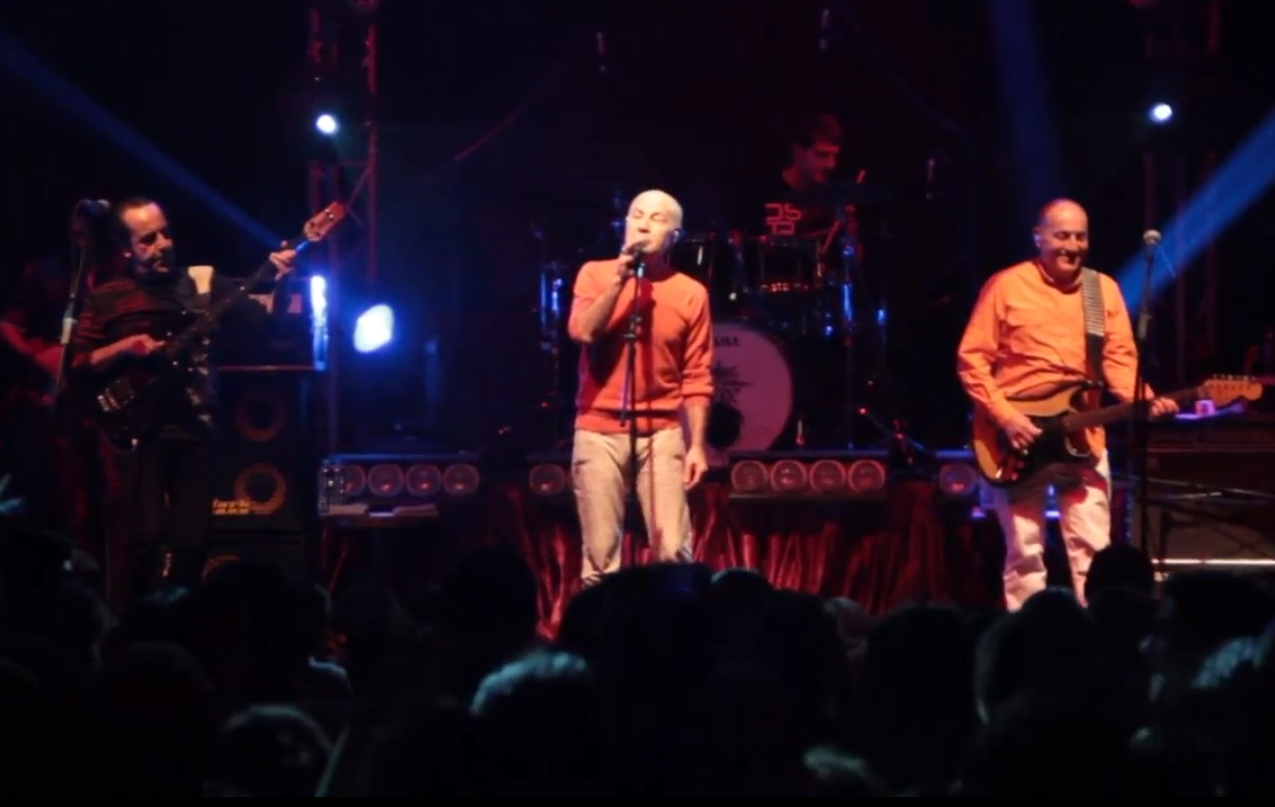
Alanson (middle) at MFÖ concert in 2012

He started playing the guitar during his high school years. In 1966, Mazhar formed the band Kaygısızlar ("The Carefree") along with Fuat Güner and Sadik Kuyas. They played the music of the Beatles, Crosby, Stills & Nash and the Rolling Stones and collaborated with the renowned Turkish pop singer Barış Manço. Later on, Özkan Uğur joined the band, and in 1972 the trio was renamed MFÖ, after the initials of the members. While Özkan was serving his military duty, Mazhar and Fuat released their first album Türküz Türkü Çığırırız ("We are Turkish, we will sing Türkü"). The album song Güllerin İçinden ("From in-between the roses") brought the group to a broader audience. In 1974, Galip Boransu and Ayhan Sicimoğlu joined the band, and the quintet took the name İpucu Beşlisi ("Clue Quintet"). However, the band dissolved after a short time, and the group MFÖ continued to play as a trio again.

Between 1972 and 1982, Mazhar Alanson performed as an actor at the Ankara State Theatre, performing a number of leading roles in major plays.

MFÖ represented Turkey in the Eurovision Song Contest twice, in 1985 with Didai Didai Dai (placed 14) and in 1988 with Sufi (placed 15), both written and performed by themselves.

Aside from the band, he released two solo albums: Herşey Çok Güzel Olacak (1999), and Türk Lokumuyla Tatlı Rüyalar (2002).

The album Türk Lokumuyla Tatlı Rüyalar (2002) was written in the U.S. when he was abroad and apart from his group members.

He is a former jury member in most viewed TV Show of Turkey O Ses Türkiye (Turkish version of The Voice).

=== Songwriting ===
Before MFÖ, he mostly composed folk rock. Mazhar Alanson wrote almost all of the MFÖ's songs, including "Bu Sabah Yağmur Var İstanbul'da", "Güllerin İçinden", "Bodrum", "Peki Peki Anladık", "Gözyaşlarımızı Bitti mi Sandın", "Sen ve Ben", and "Sarı Laleler". Sufism items attract attention in his songs, such as "Buselik Makamına", "Uç Oldum", "Adımız Miskindir Bizim" and "Yandım".

=== Acting ===
He played in several TV commercials and some films. In the film Arkadaşım Şeytan (Demon, My Friend), directed by Atıf Yılmaz, he played the role of Mephistopheles. He wrote also the film score. In his second film Her Şey Çok Güzel Olacak ("Everything's Gonna Be Alright") directed by Ömer Vargı, Mazhar Alanson shared the leading roles with Cem Yılmaz and Ceyda Düvenci. The film, which he also wrote the score for, became the highest-grossing movie in 1998. He shared in 2002 the leading role again with Cem Yılmaz in the film Yıldızlı Pekiyi ("A+" (letter grade in school)). The same year, he played in the TV series Çekirdek Aile ("Nuclear family") produced for Kanal D. In 2006, he appeared in the Cem Yılmaz movie Hokkabaz ("The Magician").

== Personal life ==
He married Hale Alanson in 1972. The couple had two children and divorced in 2003. Mazhar got married for a second time to Biricik Suden, a fashion designer. He is a known member of the Istanbul-based Sufi Islamic Jerrahi tariqa.

== Discography ==
=== Solo albums ===
- Türk Lokumuyla Tatlı Rüyalar (2002)
- Yazan Aşık (2019)
- Senfoni (2022)

=== Other albums ===
- Her Şey Çok Güzel Olacak (1997) - Her Şey Çok Güzel Olacak movie soundtrack
- Söz Müzik Mazhar Alanson (2010) - published together with Mazhar Olmak's book

=== As guest artist ===
- Komser Şekspir Original Soundtrack (2001) - Ömer Özgür ("Bir Sonsuz Yağmur Yağsa")
- Nil Kıyısında (2009) - Nil Karaibrahimgil ("İlla")
- Altüst (2014) - Athena ("Adımız Miskindir Bizim")

== Filmography ==
=== Film ===
- Arkadaşım Şeytan (1988)
- Her Şey Çok Güzel Olacak (1998)
- Hokkabaz (2006)
- Kirpi (2008)
- Pek Yakında (2014, cameo)

=== Television series ===
- Çekirdek Aile (2002)
- Ekmek Teknesi (2002)
- İkinci Bahar
- Küçük Hesaplar (2012)
- Osmanlı Tokadı (2013)

== Theater ==
- Serjeant Musgrave's Dance : John Arden - Ankara State Theater - 1979
- Children of the Sun : Maxim Gorky - Ankara State Theater - 1978
- Erkek Satı : Fazıl Hayati Çorbacıoğlu - Ankara State Theater - 1976
- Düşüş : Nahit Sırrı Örik - Ankara State Theater - 1975
- Suçsuzlar Çağı Suçlular Çağı : Siegfried Lenz - Ankara State Theater - 1974
- The Government Inspector : Nikolai Gogol - Ankara State Theater - 1973
- Karaların Memetleri : Cahit Atay - Ankara State Theater - 1973
- Ögretmen : Tuncer Cücenoğlu - Ankara State Theater - 1972
- Evhami : Feraizcizade Mehmet Şakir - Ankara State Theater - 1972
- Bir Tafsiye Mektubu : Ephraim Kishon - Ankara State Theater - 1972
- Alaatinin Sihirli Lambası : Ferdi Merter - Ankara State Theater - 1972
- Ne Güzel Şey : İsmet Kür - Ankara State Theater - 1971
