= Balalaika (disambiguation) =

A balalaika is a stringed musical instrument of Russian origin.

Balalaika may also refer to:

== Film and stage ==
- Balalaika (musical), 1936 musical play with words and lyrics by Eric Maschwitz
- Balalaika (film), a 1939 MGM musical romance film based on the 1936 musical play
- Balalayka (film), a 2000 Turkish drama directed by Ali Özgentürk and written by Işıl Özgentürk

== Music ==
- "Balalaika" (Koharu Kusumi song), a 2006 Japanese song
- "Balalaika", a Hebrew song by Ilanit
- "Balalaika", a 2009 Romanian song by Anna Lesko

== Other ==
- Balalaika, a character in the Japanese manga and anime Black Lagoon
- Balalaika - Dalla Russia col pallone, a sports talk show hosted by Ilary Blasi and Nicola Savino with Belén Rodríguez
- An unofficial nickname for the Mikoyan-Gurevich MiG-21 Russian fighter jet, from its planform shape

== See also ==
- "Balleilakka", a song from Sivaji composed by A. R. Rahman
- "Balle Lakka", a song from Mankatha composed by Yuvan Shankar Raja
