= Çağlar Çorumlu =

Turkish actor

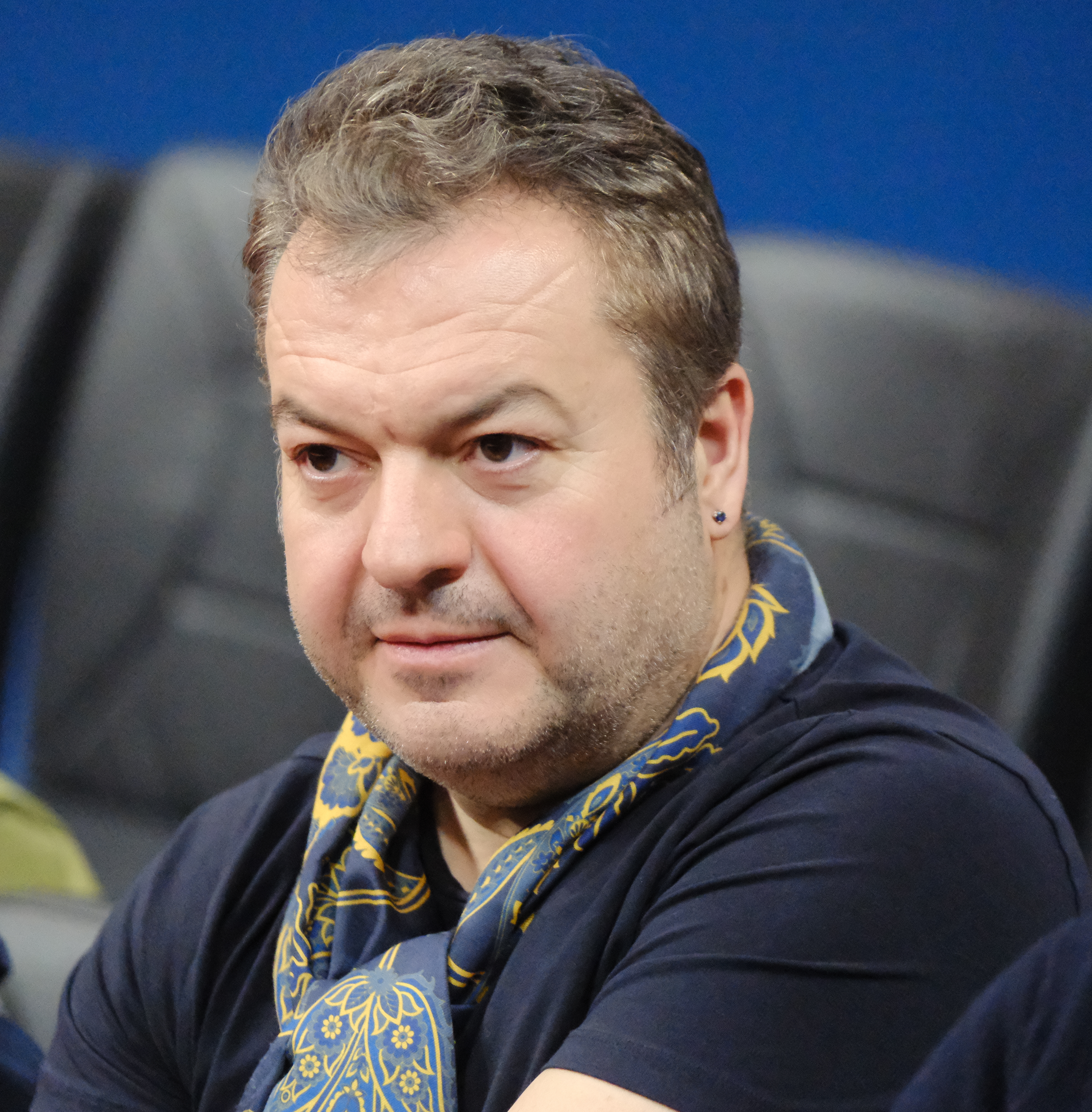
- Born: 4 December 1977 (age 48); Merzifon, Turkey
- Occupation: Actor
- Years active: 1999–present
- Spouse: Gaye Pişkin (m. 2012)

Çağlar Çorumlu (born 4 December 1977) is a Turkish actor.

== Early life ==
Çorumlu was born in 1977 in Merzifon. His parents were teachers. In 1994, he graduated from Merzifon High School and then moved to Eskişehir. In 2000, he finished his studies at Anadolu University with a degree in tourism and hotel management.. While studying, he joined the theatre club of his university. After finishing his studies, he moved to Istanbul in 2000 to pursue a career in theatre. He soon started a career on stage as well as on television.

== Career ==
=== Sketches Shows ===
He played many roles in sketches series "Haneler". He worked as an actor for numerous different roles in the theatrical Güldür Güldür Show, which were released on Show TV.

=== TV Series ===
He then had a role on the hit sitcom 7 Numara as Yusuf Güdük.

=== Web Series ===
He played in comedy crime "Ayak İşleri" for 4 seasons. He played an actor and his many roles in Netflix spin off comedy Erşan Kuneri. He played in comedy "Jet Sosyete".

=== Films ===
He played singer Zeki Müren in hit comedy film Arif V 216. He played in projects of famous humour writers like Gülse Birsel, Cem Yılmaz, and Yılmaz Erdoğan. His some comedy films are "Kolonya Cumhuriyeti", "Hazine", "Yok Artık", "Karakomik Filmler 2:Emanet", "Pek Yakında", "Osmanlı Cumhuriyeti", "Tatlım Tatlım".

In 2010, he was praised for his role in Çağan Irmak's movie Prensesin Uykusu. He played in Zeki Demirkubuz's art films "Kader", "Bulantı", "Kor". He played in Ferzan Özpetek's film "Cebimdeki Yabancı".

=== Theatre ===
His first professional experience on stage was at Cabaret Taksim. In 2007, he joined the crew of Istanbul City Theatres and worked for them until 2013. In 2013, he founded his own theatre company TiyatrOPS. Additionally, in 2012, for his performance in an adaptation of Oriental Dentist, he received the Best Actor in a Musical or Comedy award at the 16th Afife Jale Theatre Awards. He founded "TiyatrOPS Theatre".

== Filmography ==
=== Sketches Programming ===
- Haneler : Çağlar - 2009
- Güldür Güldür : Şevket - 2013

=== Web Series ===
- Jet Sosyete : Yaşar Yüksel - (2018–2019 / 2020)
- Ayak İşleri : Vedat - 2021–2022
- Erşan Kuneri : Altın Oran - 2022

=== Series ===
- Ruhsar : Baha - 2000
- Yedi Numara : Yusuf - 2000
- Ah Polis Olsam : 2006
- Ezo Gelin : Zeki - 2006
- Hayat Türküsü : Sezgin - 2006
- Avrupa Yakası : 2007
- İbret-i Ailem : Kenan - 2012
- Koyu Kırmızı : Galip - 2012
- Cesur Hemşire : Babür - 2013
- Aldırma Gönül : Levent - 2013
- Babam Çok Değişti : Mehmet Ali - 2020–2021

=== Films ===
- Gece Yürüyüşü : Hakan - 2005
- Ters Köşe : Sinan - 2005
- Yanılgılar : Mehmet - 2006
- Kader : Kamil - 2006
- Derman : Güven - 2008
- Üvey Aile : Feyyaz - 2008
- Osmanlı Cumhuriyeti : Cooker - 2008
- Teyzanne : Şaşkın Bakkal - 2009
- Rina : Umut - 2009
- Prensesin Uykusu : Aziz - 2010
- Daire : Necip - 2014
- Pek Yakında : Zeki - 2014
- Yok Artık! : Semih - 2015
- Bulantı: Beşir - 2015
- Kor : Aslan - 2016
- Tatlım Tatlım:Haybeden Gerçeküstü Aşk : 2017
- Kolonya Cumhuriyeti : Peker - 2017
- Arif V 216 : Zeki Müren - 2018
- Cebimdeki Yabancı : 2018
- Karakomik Filmler 2: Emanet - 2020
- Hazine : Mesut - 2022

== Awards ==
- 2012 - 16th Afife Theatre Awards, "Best Actor for Musical or Comedy Role" (Oriental Dentist )
- 2015 - 20th Sadri Alışık Cinema Awards, "Best Supporting Actor for Musical or Comedy Role" (Pek Yakında)
- 2017 - 44th Golden Butterfly Awards, "Best Comedy & Romantic Actor" (Güldür Güldür Show)
