= Everything's Gonna Be Great =

- Film poster
- Directed by: Ömer Vargı
- Written by: Ömer Vargı; Hakan Haksun
- Produced by: Mine Vargı
- Starring: Cem Yılmaz; Mazhar Alanson; Ceyda Düvenci
- Cinematography: Garry Turmbull
- Distributed by: Filma Cass
- Release date: 27 November 1998
- Country: Turkey
- Language: Turkish
- Box office: 9,540,415 TL

Everything's Gonna Be Great (Turkish: Herşey Çok Güzel Olacak) is a 1998 Turkish comedy film, directed by Ömer Vargı, starring Cem Yılmaz a small-time crook who steals from his brother's pharmaceutical warehouse. The film, which went on nationwide general release across Turkey on 27 November 1998, was a major box-office success.

== Plot ==
After a series of unsuccessful business ventures, Altan spends his time doing nothing until his wife Ayla leaves him. He plans to win her back with a new business venture - a bar. One night he bumps into his brother Nuri whom he hasn't seen for years and who works in a pharmaceutical warehouse. Altan sees a way to make some money and before long the brothers are involved in a dangerous game. Altan remains optimistic in spite of everything that happens to them, but Nuri is a fatalist. Together, they struggle for survival, hoping that everything will be great, or better still, superb.

== Cast ==
- Cem Yılmaz as Altan Çamlı
- Mazhar Alanson as Nuri Çamlı
- Ceyda Düvenci as Ayla Çamlı
- Selim Naşit Özcan as Cevat Çamlı
- Mustafa Uzunyılmaz as Nusret
- Adnan Tönel as Osman
