= Cem Yılmaz =

Turkish actor and comedian (born 1973)

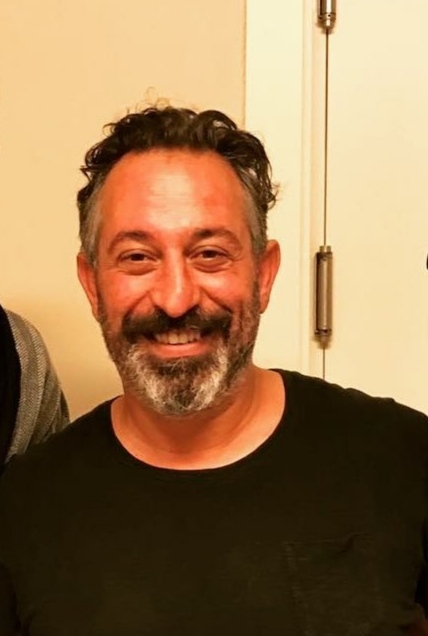
- Yılmaz in 2026
- Born: 23 April 1973 (age 53); Fatih, Istanbul, Turkey
- Education: Boğaziçi University
- Occupations: Actor; comedian; musician; filmmaker
- Years active: 1995–present
- Spouse: Ahu Yağtu (m. 2012; div. 2013)
- Children: 1
- Relatives: Tolga Çevik (brother-in-law)
- Website: www.cmylmz.com

Cem Yılmaz (Turkish pronunciation: [ˈdʒem jɯɫˈmaz], born 23 April 1973) is a Turkish actor, stand-up comedian, musician, filmmaker, screenwriter, and cartoonist. He has four franchise film series: G.O.R.A., Karakomik Filmler, Organize İşler, Vizontele. He is also known for his films Yahşi Batı, Hokkabaz, İftarlık Gazoz, and Av Mevsimi, and has won three Sadri Alışık awards and a Yeşilçam award for his roles. His international films are Russell Crowe's film "Water Diviner" and Ferzan Özpetek's film "Magnifica presenza".

== Early life and education ==
Yılmaz was born on 23 April 1973 in Istanbul. His family is paternally from Gürün, Sivas, while the maternal part of his family is of Turkish origin who immigrated from Thessaloniki, Ottoman Empire (nowadays in Greece). He went to primary school at the Mehmet Akif School. He then got enrolled in the Bahçelievler Kazım Karabekir Secondary School, and then Etiler Anadolu Tourism Vocational High School, eventually going to Boğaziçi University and finishing his studies in Tourism and Hotel Management.

== Career ==
Yılmaz began working for the satirical magazine LeMan during the early 1990s. He staged his first show during his time at the magazine, at the LeMan Cultural Centre, which was opened on the ground floor of the magazine's building. He subsequently began performing at the Beşiktaş Cultural Centre, where he made a name for himself through the shows he organised there. In 1995, he appeared in the music video for a song from the album Kime Ne, released by Özlem Tekin.

In 1998, he had his cinematic debut with the movie Everything's Gonna Be Great. Yılmaz achieved his greatest success by starring in and writing the big-budget sci-fi parody G.O.R.A. (2004), also directed by Ömer Faruk Sorak. Despite spending several years in production because of financial and other technical problems, G.O.R.A. became a box-office hit and, according to Rekin Teksoy, "showed that popular cinema was successful in appealing to wide audiences". He has since repeated his box office successes with a sequel to G.O.R.A called A.R.O.G., The Magician and Yahşi Batı, and has appeared in more than 10 films and worked as a voice actor in a number of motion pictures. He played in the movie "Water Diviner" with Russell Crowe.

Yılmaz has created seven stand-up specials. In addition, he has directed the Borusan Istanbul Philharmonic Orchestra twice.

During the course of his career, Cem Yılmaz has been the commercial face of Panasonic, Opet, Türk Telekom, Türkiye İş Bankası and Doritos, among others. The caricatures that he has drawn and the scenario of three of his movies that were released in the form of a book were well received by fans.

He has also received a number of awards in Turkey, including a "Best Actor Award" at the Sadri Alışık Awards and the 4th Yeşilçam Awards.

== Personal life ==
His brother is writer Can Yılmaz. His sister married comedian Tolga Çevik.

On 10 March 2012, he married Ahu Yağtu. The couple divorced on 31 December 2013. Together they have a son named Kemal.

== Filmography ==
Web series
| Year | Title | Credited as | | | | | Notes |
| Year | Title | Director | Producer | Writer | Actor | Role | Notes |
|---|---|---|---|---|---|---|---|
| 2022-2024 | Erşan Kuneri | Yes | Yes | Yes | Yes | Erşan Kuneri | A series focusing on the life of the character Erşan Kuneri, who appeared in the films G.O.R.A. and Arif V 216, during the 1970s and 1980s. Filming for the series was completed in September 2021, and it premiered on Netflix on 13 May 2022. |

Films
| Year | Title | Credited as | | | | | Notes |
| Year | Title | Director | Producer | Writer | Actor | Role | Notes |
|---|---|---|---|---|---|---|---|
| 1998 | Everything's Gonna Be Great (Turkish: Her Şey Çok Güzel Olacak) | | | Yes | Yes | Altan Çamlı | |
| 2001 | Vizontele | | | | Yes | Fikri | |
| 2004 | G.O.R.A. | | | Yes | Yes | Arif Işık/Komutan Logar | |
| 2005 | Organize İşler | | | | Yes | Müslüm Duralmaz | Won Sadri Alışık Best Supporting Actor award |
| 2006 | The Magician (Turkish: Hokkabaz) | Yes | | Yes | Yes | İskender Tünaydın | Won BIIFF and Sadri Alışık Best Actor awards |
| 2007 | Bee Movie | | | | Yes | Barry B. Benson | Voice actor (Turkish dub) |
| 2008 | A.R.O.G | Yes | Yes | Yes | Yes | Arif Işık/Komutan Logar | |
| 2010 | Yahşi Batı | | Yes | Yes | Yes | Aziz Vefa | |
| 2010 | Arthur and the Revenge of Maltazard | | | | Yes | Arthur | Voice actor (Turkish dub) |
| 2010 | Zephyr (Turkish: Zefir) | | | | Yes | | Voice actor (special appearance). Belma Baş's first long movie, it was sponsored by Ministry of Culture and Tourism. |
| 2010 | Hunting Season (Turkish: Av Mevsimi) | | | | Yes | "Crazy" İdris | Cem Yılmaz and Şener Şen shared the leading roles. It was directed by Yavuz Turgul. 4th Yeşilçam Awards: "Best Actor" |
| 2012 | Magnificent Presence | | | | Yes | Yusuf Antep | Directed by Ferzan Özpetek, it was released in March 2012. |
| 2013 | CM101MMXI FUNDAMENTALS | | Yes | Yes | Yes | | Theatrical release of Cem Yılmaz's latest stand-up show, CM101MMXI FUNDAMENTALS. |
| 2014 | The Water Diviner | | | | Yes | Sergeant Jemal (Cemal) | First feature film directed by Russell Crowe |
| 2014 | Coming Soon (Turkish: Pek Yakında) | Yes | Yes | Yes | Yes | Zafer Yıldız/Beşir | At the 20th Sadri Alışık Awards, he won the "Most Successful Actor" award in the musical/comedy category. |
| 2015 | Ali Baba and the Seven Dwarfs (Turkish: Ali Baba ve Yedi Cüceler) | Yes | Yes | Yes | Yes | Ali Şenay/Boris Mancov | |
| 2016 | İftarlık Gazoz | | | | Yes | Cibar Kemal | The story takes place in the 1970s. |
| 2016 | Zootopia | | | | Yes | Nick Wilde | Voice actor (Turkish dub) |
| 2017 | Deli Aşk | | Yes | | Yes | Erman Eratlı | |
| 2018 | Arif V 216 | | Yes | Yes | Yes | Arif Işık | Sequel to G.O.R.A and A.R.O.G |
| 2019 | Karakomik Filmler | Yes | Yes | Yes | Yes | Ayzek, Alpay | A cinematic release consisting of two separate movies, Kaçamak and 2 Arada. |
| 2020 | Karakomik Filmler 2 | Yes | Yes | Yes | Yes | Güven, Birol | A cinematic release consisting of two separate movies, Deli and Emanet. |
| 2023 | Do Not Disturb | Yes | Yes | Yes | Yes | Ayzek | |
| 2025 | Zootopia 2 | | | | Yes | Voice actor (Turkish dub) | |
| ? | GORA 4 GORA | Yes | Yes | Yes | Yes | Arif Işık | Sequel to Arif V 216 |

== Recurring collaborators ==
| Oyuncu | Everything's Gonna Be Great (1998) | G.O.R.A. (2004) | The Magician (2006) | A.R.O.G (2008) | Yahşi Batı (2010) | Coming Soon (2014) | Ali Baba and the Seven Dwarfs (2015) | Arif V 216 (2018) | Karakomik Filmler (2019) | Karakomik Filmler 2 (2020) | Erşan Kuneri (2022-2024) | Total |
|---|---|---|---|---|---|---|---|---|---|---|---|---|
| Mazhar Alanson | Yes | | Yes | | | check | | | | | | 3 |
| Özkan Uğur | | Yes | | Yes | Yes | Yes | | Yes | Yes | Yes | Yes | 8 |
| Ozan Güven | | Yes | | Yes | Yes | Yes | | Yes | Yes | | | 6 |
| Özge Özberk | | Yes | | Yes | | | | Yes | | | | 3 |
| Zafer Algöz | | | | Yes | Yes | Yes | Yes | Yes | Yes | | Yes | 7 |
| Çağlar Çorumlu | | | | | | Yes | | Yes | | Yes | Yes | 4 |

== Shows ==
| Year | Title | Notes |
|---|---|---|
| 1999 | Milenyum | Stand up |
| 1999 | Bir Tat Bir Doku | Stand up |
| 2001-2007 | CMYLMZ | Stand up |
| 2010 | CMYLMZ Soru & Cevap | Stand up |
| 2011-2013 | CM101MMXI Fundamentals | Stand up |
| 2014 | STANDartCY | Stand up |
| 2019-2021 | CMYLMZ Diamond Elite Platinum Plus | Stand up |
| 2024-present | CMXXIV | Stand up |
