= The Magician (2006 film) =

- DVD Cover
- Turkish: Hokkabaz
- Directed by: Cem Yılmaz; Ali Taner Baltacı
- Written by: Cem Yılmaz
- Produced by: Necati Akpinar
- Starring: Cem Yılmaz; Mazhar Alanson; Özlem Tekin; Tuna Orhan
- Cinematography: Uğur İçbak
- Edited by: Engin Öztürk
- Music by: Ozan Çolakoğlu
- Production company: Beşiktaş Kültür Merkezi
- Distributed by: KenDa Film
- Release date: 20 October 2006
- Running time: 119 mins
- Country: Turkey
- Language: Turkish
- Box office: $9,146,764

The Magician (Turkish: Hokkabaz) is a 2006 Turkish comedy-drama film, directed by Cem Yılmaz and Ali Taner Baltacı, about a magician who tours around Turkey with his father and best friend so that he can make enough money for laser eye surgery. The film, which was released on October 20, 2006, was short-listed for Turkey's official entry for the Academy Award for Best Foreign Language Film at the 80th Academy Awards but lost out to Takva.

== Production ==
The film was shot on location in Istanbul, Gallipoli and Eceabat, Turkey.

== Plot ==
Iskender is a juggler, while Maradona is a magician—at least to everyone except himself and his childhood friend. As they flee Istanbul, the two take a significant risk by adding Sait to their touring act, despite Father Sait having lost his appreciation for Iskender years earlier. The tour brings them closer but also leads to a bitter falling-out. Along the way, Iskender, Maradona, and Sait repeatedly reunite and clash with their fellow traveler, Fatma.

== Cast ==
- Cem Yılmaz as İskender Tünaydın
- Mazhar Alanson as Sait Tünaydın
- Özlem Tekin as Fatma Nur Gaye Türksönmez
- Tuna Orhan as Maradona - Orhan Direk

== Release ==
The film opened in 378 screens across Turkey on 20 October 2006 at number one in the Turkish box office chart with an opening weekend gross of $1,462,608 and was later released across a number of European territories.

Opening weekend gross
Date	Territory	Screens	Rank	Gross
20 October 2006	Turkey	378	1	$1,462,608
25 October 2006	Belgium	6	19	$38,916
26 October 2006	Germany	52	12	$198,149
26 October 2006	Austria	4	13	$41,780
26 October 2006	Netherlands	17	14	$53,749
27 October 2006	United Kingdom	4	24	$34,704

== Reception ==
=== Box Office ===
The film was number one at the Turkish box office for two weeks running and has made a total worldwide gross of $9,146,764.

=== Reviews ===
Todd Brown, writing for Twitch Film, notes that this film, looks to be a beautifully shot piece of work, and that, while it was impossible not to see an awful lot of Mel Brooks influence on [the writer-director's previous film] G.O.R.A. this one sees Yilmaz in a much more restrained mode that I think plays a fair bit better.

=== Awards ===
- 2007 Ankara International Film Festival Most Promising Actor: Tuna Orhan (Won)
- 2007 Brussels International Independent Film Festival Best Actor (International Competition): Cem Yilmaz (Won)
- 2007 Istanbul International Film Festival Golden Tulip: Cem Yilmaz & Ali Taner Baltaci (Nominated)
- 2007 Sadri Alışık Cinema and Theater Award for Best Actor: Cem Yilmaz (Nominated)

== See also ==
- 2006 in film
