= Family Secrets (2016 TV series) =

Turkish television series

- Genre: Drama
- Written by: Onur Uğraş; Murat Uyurkulak
- Directed by: Nihat Durak
- Starring: Bülten İnal; Ayça Bingöl; Ceyda Düvenci; Caner Şahin; Sera Kutlubey; Sercan Badur; Doğa Zeynep Doğuşlu
- Country of origin: Turkey
- Original language: Turkish
- No. of seasons: 1
- No. of episodes: 13 (41 international version)

Production
- Producer: Faruk Turgut
- Running time: 120 minutes
- Production company: Gold Film

Original release
- Network: Kanal D
- Release: 19 September – 12 December 2016

Family Secrets (Turkish: Babam ve Ailesi) is a Turkish television series produced by Gold Film and aired by Kanal D from Monday at 20:00, between September 19 and December 12, 2016, in 13 episodes. It was written by Onur Uğraş and Murat Uyurkulak, and directed by Nihat Durak with artistic direction by Özüdoğru Cici.

Its cast includes Bülten İnal, Ayça Bingöl, Ceyda Düvenci, Caner Şahin, Sera Kutlubey, Sercan Badur and Doğa Zeynep Doğuşlu.

== Plot ==
Kemal is a renowned businessman who lives an enviable life in Istanbul, along with his wife Suzan and sons Mert and Çiçek, whom he loves very much. Suzan, for her part, believes she lives in a 20-year marriage that cannot be more perfect, along with two children and a devoted husband whom she is hopelessly in love with. Without compatible parents, Kemal admits that he has another family and two more children, which may be Mert's only salvation.

== Cast ==
- Ayça Bingöl as Nilgün Kayalar
- Bülent İnal as Kemal İpekçi
- Ceyda Düvenci as Suzan İpekçi
- Erdem Akakçe as Fadıl Kayalar
- Sercan Badur as Mert İpekçi
- Caner Şahin as Kadir Kayalar
- Sera Kutlubey as Hasret Kayalar
- Emel Göksu as Macide İpekçi
- Eva Dedova as Ece
- Doğa Zeynep Doğuşlu as Çiçek İpekçi
- Kubilay Karslıoğlu as Ahmet
- Fulya Ülvan as Filiz
- Sezin Bozacı as Emine
- Hakan Altuntaş as Rıza
- Ecem Simge Yurdatapan as Yelda
- Can Albayrak as İbo
- İlker Özer as Kerim
- Emre Başer as Orhan
- Kosta Kortidis as Arif
