= Avrupalı =

2007 Turkish comedy film

- Film poster
- Directed by: Ulaş Ak
- Starring: Cem Davran; Yasemin Kozanoğlu; Sema Öztürk; İlknur Soydaş
- Release date: October 12, 2007
- Country: Turkey
- Language: Turkish

Avrupalı is a 2007 Turkish comedy film directed by Ulaş Ak, starring Cem Davran, Yasemin Kozanoğlu, Sema Öztürk, İlknur Soydaş and Aydemir Akbaş. It was released on October 12, 2007.
