= Ali Baba and the Seven Dwarfs =

- Directed by: Cem Yılmaz
- Starring: Cem Yılmaz; Irina Ivkina; Çetin Altay; Zafer Algöz
- Release date: 13 November 2015
- Running time: 1h 54min
- Country: Turkey
- Language: Turkish

Ali Baba and the Seven Dwarfs (Turkish: Ali Baba ve 7 Cüceler) is a 2015 Turkish comedy action film written and directed by Cem Yılmaz, about two Turkish brothers-in-law who visit a gardening fair in Bulgaria to sell their garden gnomes and suddenly find themselves in the middle of a manhunt.

== Cast ==
- Cem Yılmaz - Ali Şenay / Boris Mancov
- Irina Ivkina - Veronica
- Çetin Altay - İlber / Dilber
- Zafer Algöz - Kenan Memedov
- Can Yılmaz - İsmail Bey
- Bahtiyar Engin - Mitko Tasev
- Fevzi Gökçe - Sadık
- Yosi Mizrahi - Tayanç Pakça
