= Arif V 216 =

- Theatrical release poster
- Directed by: Kıvanç Baruönü
- Written by: Cem Yılmaz
- Produced by: Muzaffer Yıldırım; Cem Yılmaz
- Starring: Cem Yılmaz; Ozan Güven; Seda Bakan; Zafer Algöz; Özkan Uğur
- Cinematography: Jean Paul Seresin
- Music by: Jingle House; İskender Paydaş
- Production companies: CMYLMZ Fikir Sanat; NuLook
- Distributed by: Mars Dağıtım
- Release dates: 3 January 2018 (Istanbul); 5 January 2018 (Turkey)
- Running time: 126 min
- Country: Turkey
- Language: Turkish
- Budget: $9 million
- Box office: ₺62,4 million

Arif V 216 is a 2018 Turkish comedy film directed by Kıvanç Baruönü and written by Cem Yılmaz. It stars Cem Yılmaz, Ozan Güven, Seda Bakan, Zafer Algöz and Özkan Uğur. It is a sequel to A.R.O.G (2008) and G.O.R.A (2004).

== Plot ==
Robot 216 visits Arif in Istanbul, telling him that he wants to live as a human, but Arif's neighbors protest against 216's presence. To escape, Arif activates Ceku's time machine and ends up with 216 in 1969. Arif passes 216 off as a circus clown named Ali. When Arif's watch gets stolen, he chases after the thieves into an alley, where they run into Pembeşeker, a blind lady who 216 rescues Pembeşeker from being hit by a car. The thieves, revealed to be Pembeşeker's relatives, return Arif's watch.

Arif and 216 are taken in by Pembeşeker's family, who make up a musical troupe. 216 joins the troupe to help raise funds for Pembeşeker's eye surgery. At a party, 216 impresses the audience by performing next to Ajda Pekkan, catching the attention of thugs working for Besim Toker, an Ajda Pekkan admirer and CEO of toy manufacturer Pertev Industries. The thugs disable 216 and abduct him. He is presented to Besim, who is fascinated by his advanced technology and seeks to mass-reproduce copies of him as part of a new product. 216 agrees in order to help Pembeşeker. Besim's thugs send Arif an invitation to Besim's villa to attend 216's launch party. Arif argues with 216 and tries to persuade him to return to their timeline, but Besim takes Arif aside to haggle over 216. Witnessing this, 216 falls out with Arif, who is expelled.

Arif tells Pembeşeker's family of what happened and presents the money 216 received from Besim to be used in her surgery. A moved Pembeşeker reveals that she is not blind and that she and her family are actually a research team led by Professor Kemal pondering whether goodness exists outside movies. Arif tries to convince Pembeşeker, whose real name is Alev, that he is from the future. However, a dismissive Alev tinkers with Ceku's time machine and accidentally transports herself and Arif to a dystopian version of Istanbul, where they are captured by 216, who now rules the world as a tyrant after Pertev's robots displaced humans. 216 reveals that he felt betrayed after Arif and Pembeşeker's disappearance, whom he mistook as their elopement, further aggravated by Professor Kemal's subsequent negative conclusions. After a scuffle, 216's throws off Arif from his high-rise office. Alev jumps after Arif and rescues him by activating the time machine back to 1969.

Arif and Alev warn Professor Kemal to conclude his research on a positive note, but the latter dismisses them until Garavel suddenly teleports in front of them. The four then hatch a plan to make 216 fall in love with Pembeşeker and sabotage 216's release. Arif arranges for an operation to cure Garavel's blindness and uses songs from his timeline and Zeki Müren’s costumes to become an overnight pop sensation, upstaging 216 and annoying Zeki, while Alev pretends to be Pembeşeker and claims to 216 that she had been cured with the money he provided. At a concert, Arif humiliates 216 by showing that he cannot dance, tanking sales of his copies. A frustrated Besim arranges for 216 to be sold off. In despair, 216 reveals to Alev that he went to Earth to see Arif one last time, as his battery is running out and Gora has stopped production of his spare parts.

Alev tells Arif of 216's situation. A remorseful Arif arranges for a reunion with 216, but at the rendezvous 216 malfunctions and shuts down before being taken to a junkyard, while Alev is abducted by Besim's sister Pervin, who overheard Arif's plans. With the help of a young Bob Marley Faruk, Arif and Garavel retrieve 216 and revive him. Upon learning of Alev's kidnapping, Arif, Garavel and 216 meet with Besim, who is holding Alev hostage at a club. Their meeting is interrupted by Zeki, who shoots at Arif in revenge for copying him. Besim escapes with 216 on a plane, with Zeki offering his private aircraft to Arif in exchange for him ending his imitations. Garavel, Arif and Alev chase Besim. Arif jumps onto Besim's plane, while Besim shoots down Zeki's plane, forcing Garavel to teleport himself and Alev. Besim lunges at Arif but inadvertently ejects himself. After giving 216 and himself a parachute, Arif rescues Besim, moving him into contrition. The three land safely, and Alev and Professor Kemal reaffirm their positive hypothesis on goodness as Arif and 216 leave for their timeline. 216 gives Alev a toy robot as a reminder of him.

At a beach in the restored present, Ediz Hun gives 216 a long-term solar-powered battery, while Ceku presents 216 with 232, a humanoid robot version of Pembeşeker. Arif, Ceku and Ediz watch as the two robots stroll off into the sunset.

== Cast ==
- Cem Yılmaz as Arif Işık/Erşan Kuneri
- Ozan Güven as 216/Barış Manço
- Seda Bakan as Pembeşeker/232
- Zafer Algöz as Besim Toker
- Özkan Uğur as Garavel
- Özge Özberk as Ceku
- Kerem Alışık as Ömer
- Ediz Hun as Himself
- Farah Zeynep Abdullah as Ajda Pekkan
- Mustafa Sandal as Mahalleli
- Mert Fırat as Sadri Alışık
- Can Yılmaz as Eryetiş
- Çağlar Çorumlu as Zeki Müren
- Ahu Yağtu as Pervin Toker
- Maria Anastasiyeva as Filiz Akın
- Murat Arkın as Cüneyt Arkın
- Şükrü Özyıldız as Ayhan Işık

== Release ==
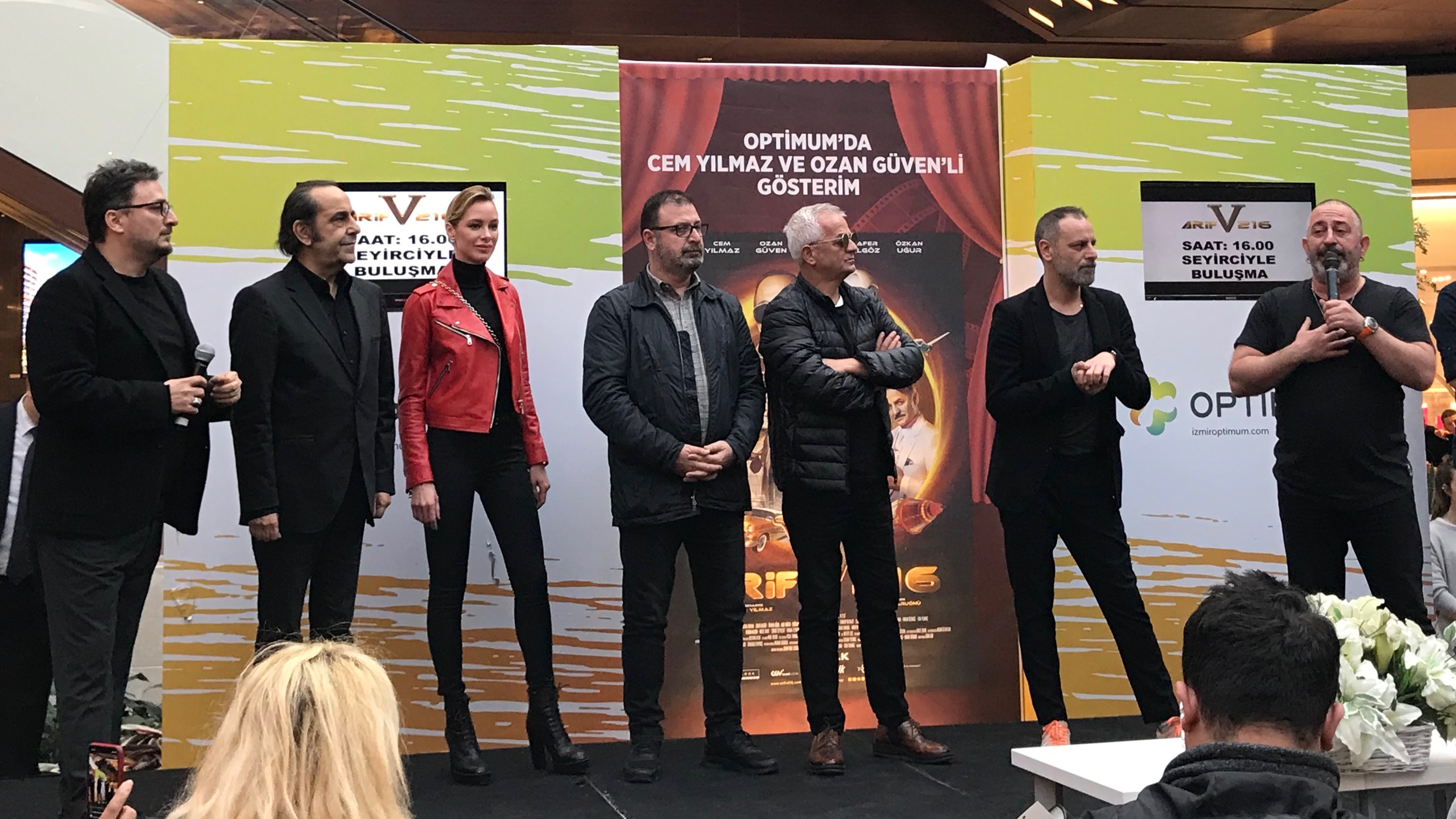
From left to right: Kıvanç Baruönü, Özkan Uğur, Maria Anastasiyeva, Can Yılmaz, Zafer Algöz, Ozan Güven and Cem Yılmaz at the film's premiere in İzmir

The premiere for Arif V 216 was held on 3 January 2018 at Zorlu Center in Istanbul. It was released throughout Turkey on 5 January. Special screenings were held on 5–7 January in Istanbul, Ankara and İzmir with the participation of actors. Released in 1,300 theaters across Turkey, it was watched by 1,331,691 people and became the fourth most-watched feature film of all time in Turkey and the one with the most number of viewers in January. On its first week of release, 2,092,000 people watched the film in total and it grossed ₺27.2 million.

On 11 January, the film was released in a number of European countries. Special screenings were held on 12 January in Berlin, and on 13 January in Amsterdam.
