= Yahşi Batı =

2010 film

- Theatrical poster
- Directed by: Ömer Faruk Sorak
- Written by: Cem Yılmaz
- Produced by: Murat Akdilek; Cem Yılmaz
- Starring: Cem Yılmaz; Ozan Güven; Demet Evgar; Özkan Uğur; Zafer Algöz
- Cinematography: Mirsad Herović
- Distributed by: UIP
- Release date: 1 January 2010
- Running time: 119 minutes
- Country: Turkey
- Language: Turkish
- Box office: $13,733,563

Yahşi Batı is a 2010 Turkish comedy film, directed by Ömer Faruk Sorak, which stars Cem Yılmaz as special agents tasked by the Sultan of the Ottoman Empire to deliver a diamond gift to the American president. The film, which went on nationwide general release across Turkey on January 1, 2010, was one of highest-grossing Turkish films of 2010. The title Yahşi Batı ("Mild West") is a play on the term Vahşi Batı ("Wild West").

== Plot ==
Two special agents, Aziz and Lemi, are tasked by the Sultan of the Ottoman Empire with delivering a diamond as a gift to the American president. As they ride on a stagecoach across the American wild west, they are robbed of the diamond by bandits, leaving them stranded without any money. A tough cowgirl, Susanne Van Dyke (a character like Calamity Jane) joins them on their quest.

== Cast ==
- Cem Yılmaz as Aziz Vefa
- Ozan Güven as Lemi Galip
- Demet Evgar as Susanne Van Dyke
- Demet Tuncer as Mary Lou
- Özkan Uğur as Chief Red Rocks
- Zafer Algöz as Sheriff Lloyd
- Kaan Öztop as Chuck
- Yılmaz Köksal as Sheriff Çeko
- Ferdi Sancar as Johnnie
- Dilek Çelebi as Betty
- İştar Gökseven as Garry
- Mehmet Polat as Johnny Lesh
- Süleyman Turan as Sheriff Murphy
- Tuncay Özinel as Josh
- Uğur Polat as Buck Berry of Brokeback
- Mazlum Çimen as Wanted Sheriff
- Tevfik Yapıcı as President James Abram Garfield
- Esat Arpaç as Son of Sheriff Lloyd

== Release ==
The film opened in 693 screens across Turkey on January 1, 2010 at number one in the Turkish box office chart with an opening weekend gross of $13,706,319.

The film later opened in one screen in the UK with a first weekend gross of £557.

== Reception ==
=== Box office ===
The film was number one at the Turkish box office for two weeks running and has made a total gross of $13,733,563.

== See also ==
- 2010 in film
- Turkish films of 2010
