= Yasemin Kozanoğlu =

Turkish actress and model (born 1978)

- Born: 7 July 1978 (age 47); Istanbul, Turkey
- Occupations: Actress, model

Yasemin Kozanoğlu (born 7 July 1978) is a Turkish actress and model.

== Biography ==
Yasemin Kozanoğlu was born to businessman Ahmet Kozanoğlu and socialite Ahu Tuğbay. She studied at Eseniş High School and later did video production in England. She started modelling and became one of the most prominent models in Turkey. Kozanoğlu began her acting career, her most notable roles being as Duygu Güner in the TV series Avcı and in the films Çilekli Pasta, Romantik and Yeşil Işık.
