= Ahu Yağtu =

Turkish actress and model

- Born: 11 July 1978 (age 48); İzmir, Turkey
- Occupation: Actress
- Years active: 1998–present
- Spouse: Cem Yılmaz (m. 2012; div. 2013)
- Children: 1

Ahu Yağtu (born 11 July 1978) is a Turkish actress and model known for her appearance on the television drama Ninety-Sixty-Ninety (2001) as well as the character "Candan" in the series Paramparça. she won the "Style Icon of the Year" award at Elle Style Awards 2013.

Yağtu made her screen debut in 2001 in 90-60-90 as Esin, and later starred in Savcının Karısı in 2005. In 2010, she appeared in the television series Aşk ve Ceza. Yahya Hassen

== TV series ==
- Kardelenler (2025) Menekşe Gündoğan
- Kardeşlerim (2021) Suzan
- Hilal, Feza and Other Planets (2019)
- Kadın (2019) Pırıl
- Paramparça (2014–2017) Candan Soyl
- Bir Çocuk Sevdim (2011) Begum
- Bir Avuç Deniz (2011) Aylin
- Aşk ve Ceza (2010) Pelin
- Komiser Nevzat (2007) Zeynep
- 29-30 (2006) Nil
- Savcının Karısı (2005) Ece
- Kampüsistan (2003)
- 90-60-90 (2001) Esin
