= Ceyda Düvenci =

Turkish actress

- Born: 16 April 1977 (age 49); Mustafakemalpaşa, Turkey
- Occupation: Actress
- Years active: 1996–present
- Spouses: Kaan Girgin (m. 2000; div. 2002) Engin Akgün (m. 2008; div. 2013) Bülent Şakrak (m. 2015; div. 2023) Güçlü Mete (m. 2026)
- Children: 2

Ceyda Ismail Düvenci (born 16 April 1977) is a Turkish actress, who has starred in several TV Shows including Binbir Gece and Umutsuz Ev Kadınları. She graduated from Marmara University (Economics) and Masters of Film and Drama in Kadir Has University In 1990s, she started her career as a television actress and presenter. She rose to prominence while presenting the morning program Sabah Şekerleri. Besides her career in television and on stage, Düvenci has authored a number of children's book based on her daughter Melisa's story, who was treated for cerebral palsy.

== Life and career ==
Ceyda Düvenci was born in Mustafakemalpaşa, Bursa, in 1977. She is the only child of actor İsmail Düvenci and music teacher Zümrüt Düvenci.

She made her acting debut in 1995 with the series Palavra Aşklar, written by Kandemir Konduk and broadcast on Kanal 6. In 1997, she took part in Star TV's beauty contest and ranked third. She then started presenting the Sabah Şekerleri on the same network, which marked her rise to prominence. She subsequently landed roles in the TV series Köstebek, Delidivane, and Tatlı Kaçıklar.

In 2000, she married actor Kaan Girgin. During this period, she played a role in the TV series Dikkat Bebek Var and presented a cooking program on television. Düvenci and Girgin divorced in 2002. Subsequently, Düvenci attended various workshops and started learning Italian. She took part in a 'film studying' workshop at Istanbul Bilgi University and showed an interest in photography. She had a leading role opposite Mahsun Kırmızıgül in the 2003 series Zalim. In the following year, she received a nomination for the Best Actress Award at the 41st Antalya Golden Orange Film Festival for her role in the movie Hoşgeldin Hayat.

Düvenci, whose mother lost her eyesight in 1981 as a result of a traffic accident, voluntarily voiced a part in Cenneti Beklerken in 2007, the first movie in Turkey for which the audio description method was used. In the following years, she took part in charity projects related to the visually impaired.

Düvenci made her debut on stage by appearing in plays staged by e.s.e.k (Espri Standartları Enstitüsü Kurumu, lit. Humor Standards Institute) in Istanbul. She portrayed the character of Pelin on stage in Üçüncü Türden Yakın İlişkiler. She was nominated for the Best Actress in a Comedy award at the Selim Naşit Theater Awards (Interpillar Theatre Awards) handed out by the Lions Clubs Selection Committee. In 2008, she went on stage with a role in Sürmanşet, a play written by Sinan Tuzcu.

Düvenci married businessman Engin Akgün on 17 August 2008. They had a daughter, named Melisa Nur, before divorcing on 4 February 2013. Their daughter has suffered from cerebral palsy due to a cerebral hemorrhage at birth, which made Düvenci study the disease and write a book on it.

In 2015, she married actor Bülent Şakrak, with whom she has a son, named Okan Ali. Beginning in 2017, the couple went on stage in various European cities due to their roles in the one-act play Hanım & Efendi. In 2018, Düvenci started presenting the Günaydın Doktor on TV8.

Düvenci voiced the character of Elena Fisher in the Turkish version of Uncharted, published for PlayStation consoles.

Focusing on child development in her second university, Düvenci wrote children's books based on the illness and treatment process of her daughter Melisa, who has cerebral palsy. In 2019, she took part in a show called Fırtına, where plays and classical music were staged for children.

== Filmography ==
Film
| Year | Title | Role |
|---|---|---|
| 1998 | Her Şey Çok Güzel Olacak | Ayla |
| 2003 | Abdülhamit Düşerken | Zekiye |
| 2004 | Hoşgeldin Hayat | Hande |
| 2005 | Bir Varmış, Bir Yokmuş | |
| 2010 | Ejder Kapanı | Cavidan |
| 2018 | Enes Batur Hayal mi Gerçek mi? | Enes Batur's mother |
| 2023 | Kadınlara Mahsus | |
TV series
| Year | Title | Role |
| 1996 | Palavra Aşklar | |
| 1996–1997 | Mirasyediler | Ayten |
| 1997 | Köstebek | |
| 1997 | Deli Divane | |
| 1997 | Tatlı Kaçıklar | |
| 1997 | Son Kumpanya | |
| 1998 | Affet Bizi Hocam | |
| 1998 | Çiçek Taksi | |
| 1998 | Canlı Hayat | Fulya |
| 1998 | Babam Olur musun | |
| 1998 | Baba | |
| 1998 | Böyle mi Olacaktı | |
| 2000 | Dikkat Bebek Var | Yasemin |
| 2002 | Öyle Bir Sevda ki | |
| 2002 | Hastayım Doktor | Ceyda |
| 2003 | Zalim | Sudenaz |
| 2004 | Sil Baştan | Kiraz |
| 2004 | Kasırga İnsanları | Cemre |
| 2005 | Bir Varmış Bir Yokmuş | |
| 2005 | Maki | |
| 2006 | Hasret | Beyhan |
| 2007–2009 | Binbir Gece | Bennu Ataman |
| 2010 | Şen Yuva | İnci |
| 2011–2014 | Umutsuz Ev Kadınları | Elif Uzun |
| 2014–2015 | Aşkın Kanunu | İpek |
| 2015 | Maral: En Güzel Hikayem | Deniz Feyman |
| 2016 | Babam ve Ailesi | Suzan İpekçi |
| 2018 | 8. Gün | Şehnaz Yüksel |
| 2018-2019 | Akşam Rüzgarı | Gözde |
| 2023 | Sakla Beni | Filiz |
Streaming movies and series
| Year | Title | Role |
| 2021 | Öğrenci Evi | Semra |
| 2022 | Don't Leave | |
| 2023 | Prens | Sion |
TV programs
| Year | Title | Role |
| 1996 | Life Style | |
| 1996 | Cici Kızlar | |
| 1997 | Sabah Şekerleri | |
| 1997 | Seç Bakalım | |
| 1998 | Şimdi Sıra Sende | |
| 2000 | Lezzet Saati | |
| 2001 | Bir Başka Gece | |
| 2003 | Çocuk Deyip Geçme | |
| 2005 | Bizim Evde Ne Oluyor | |
| 2013 | Doktorum | |
| 2016, 2018 | Buyur Bi'De Burdan Bak | |
| 2018–2019 | Günaydın Doktor | |
| 2022– | Bam Başka Sohbetler | |
| 2023– | Dünden Sonra Yarından Önce | |
| 2023– | Sakla Beni | Lead Role |

== Theatre ==
Theatre
| Year | Title | Role |
|---|---|---|
| 2001–2003 | 3. Türden Yakın İlişkiler | |
| 2006 | Ayşe Opereti | |
| 2008 | Sürmanşet | |
