= Ömer Faruk Sorak =

Turkish film director (born 1964)

- Born: 27 April 1964 (age 62); Ankara, Turkey
- Occupation: Director
- Years active: 2000–present

Ömer Faruk Sorak (born 27 April 1964) is a Turkish film director. He has directed more than ten films since 2000.

== Selected filmography ==
Year	Title	Role	Notes
2001	Vizontele		
2004	G.O.R.A.		
2006	The Exam		
2010	Yahşi Batı		
2011	Love Likes Coincidences		
2020	Love Likes Coincidences 2		
