= Commissar Shakespeare =

2001 film by Sinan Çetin

Commissar Shakespeare (Komser Şekspir)
- Theatrical film poster
- Directed by: Sinan Çetin
- Written by: Mesut Ceylan
- Produced by: Sinan Çetin; Cemil Çetin
- Starring: Kadir İnanır; Okan Bayülgen; Müjde Ar; Pelin Batu; Özkan Uğur; Gazanfer Özcan
- Cinematography: Kamil Çetin
- Edited by: Aylin Tinel
- Music by: Ömer Özgür
- Production company: Plato Film Production
- Release date: 16 February 2001
- Running time: 116 mins
- Country: Turkey
- Language: Turkish

Commissar Shakespeare (Original Turkish title: Komser Şekspir) is a 2001 Turkish comedy-drama film, directed by Sinan Çetin.

== Plot ==
Cemil is an acting Police Chief and a single father with an only daughter Su. Su who has been cast in the role of Snow White ("Pamuk Prenses") in the school play, is rehearsing when she blacks out and is taken to hospital where she is found to have leukemia. Meanwhile, Cemil's men round up a number of people, including Danyal (a mafioso), Tatü Hayati (a small-time drug dealer), Ali (a drug addict) and Deniz (an ageing prostitute). When Su's teacher refuses her the role of Snow White, Cemil, sensing his daughter's disappointment, decides that he will produce the play himself and enter it in a TV competition against the school.

He fills the cast with inmates and junior police officers under his command. Tatü Hayati who was formerly a child actor under the name "Küçük Hayaticik" (Little Hayati) and has knowledge of theatre, is appointed director. Deniz is cast as the Queen, Ali as the Prince and seven street children as the seven dwarves. The cast is instructed to present themselves to Su as real, professional actors and rehearsals begin in an empty jail cell at Cemil's police station. When Deniz breaks her leg, Danyal replaces her as the Queen.

A human rights organization pays a surprise visit to the station. They mistake the rehearsals as a prison rehabilitation program and are impressed. The district attorney and his men who visit the station on a tipoff are imprisoned in a jail cell. Cemil and the cast head to the studio for the filming . Danyal shot by a rival gangster and is replaced by Cemil as the Queen. Hayati stands in for a dwarf and is recognised by one in audience as former child star Hayaticik. The district attorney manages to escape and alerts the Police who arrest Cemil at the studio. Su dies of her disease in the final scene of the play. While Cemil is about to be sent to prison, it turns out he has been pardoned and promoted due to the glowing report by the Human rights organization about his police station. Cemil rejects the promotion and decides to form a theatre group with his former inmates and they pick Romeo and Juliet as their next project.

== Cast ==
- Kadir İnanır (Cemil)
- Okan Bayülgen (Tatü Hayati)
- Müjde Ar (Deniz)
- Pelin Batu (Su)
- Özkan Uğur (Danyal)
- Gazanfer Özcan (Cemil's father)

== Reception ==
Time Out praised the perseverance of the film but criticised the camera work. Variety indicated the film was a "huge box-office success".

== Screenings ==
The film was shown at the Turkish film festival in Sarajevo in 2013.
