= Ozan Güven =

Turkish actor (born 1975)

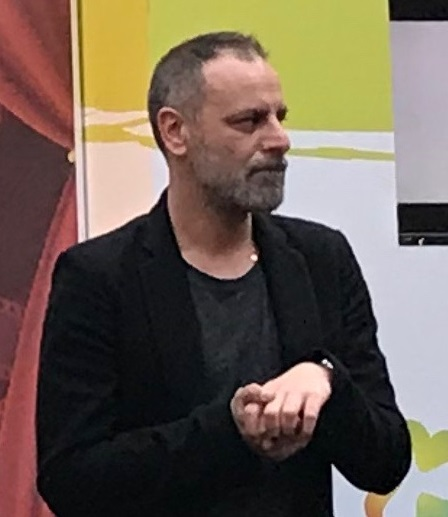
- Born: Ozan Muharrem Güven; 19 May 1975 (age 50); Nuremberg, West Germany
- Citizenship: Republic of Turkey
- Occupations: Actor, screenwriter
- Spouse: Türkan Derya (m. 2005; div. 2010)
- Children: 1 son
- Website: ozanguven.net

Ozan Muharrem Güven (born 19 May 1975) is a Turkish film, TV series, and theatre actor and screenwriter. He is best known for playing the role of Rüstem Pasha in the historical series Muhteşem Yüzyıl and other hit series including İkinci Bahar, Koçum Benim, Bir İstanbul Masalı, Canım Ailem, Fi, and Aslı ile Kerem.

== Biography ==
Güven's family is of Turkish origin who immigrated from Bulgaria to Germany. He can speak Turkish, German, English. He studied acting at the İzmir Municipal Conservatory and played at the renowned Şahika Tekand Theatre in Istanbul. He also studied Modern Dance at the Mimar Sinan Fine Arts University. With a remarkable sense of psychology and humour he forcefully performed a wide range of characters in various genres, including drama, crime thriller or satirical comedy. In addition to many TV series and critically successful art films such as Ali Özgentürk's Balalayka or Ümit Ünal's Dokuz (9), Ozan Güven also starred with his friend Cem Yılmaz in the science fiction comedy G.O.R.A, its sequel A.R.O.G as well as in the Western parody Yahşi Batı.

In 2005, he married director Türkan Derya. They have one child. They divorced in 2010.

== Controversies ==
Güven got angry when TNT reporter Tolga Aslan asked him a question while leaving a place in 2011, and the dialogue between the two was discussed on social media at the time.

On 12 June 2020, Güven's former girlfriend Deniz Bulutsuz claimed that he had beaten and tortured her. The resulting forensic report included the following: bruising in and around her left eye due to her head hitting the wall sideways, bruising and glass cuts on the inside of her arm, numerous bruises in the hip area, bruising on her left knee due to a fall down the stairs, and a slightly hazy appearance in the eye. Thereupon, a lawsuit was filed against Güven, requesting up to 13.5 years in prison, and the violent words Güven had uttered to her following a previous fight with Bulutsuz were also submitted as evidence to the case file.

== Filmography ==
=== Films ===
- Karakomik Filmler (2019), interviewing officer
- Arif V 216 (2018), Robot 216
- Annemin Yarası (2016), the lead role of Borislav Miliç (Ozan Güven was also screenplay co-author)
- Pek Yakında (2014), the role of Boğaç Boray
- Ejder Kapanı (2010)
- Yahşi Batı (2010), the role of Lemi Galip
- Anneannem (2010)
- A.R.O.G. (2008), Taşo
- Anlat İstanbul (Istanbul Tales, 2005)
- Yazı Tura (Toss-Up, 2004)
- G.O.R.A (2004), Robot 216
- Dokuz (2002), Kaya
- Balalayka (2000), Mehmet
- Yıldız Tepe (2000)

=== TV series ===
- Taş Kağıt Makas (2024), Harun Yakar
- Babil (2020), Egemen Kıvılcım
- Jet Sosyete (2018), Levent Çıkrıkçıoğlu (episode 16)
- Fi (2017–18), Can Manay
- Muhteşem Yüzyıl (2012–14), Damat Rüstem Paşa
- Koyu Kırmızı (2012), Cemil Şenel
- Canım Ailem (2009), Ali
- Hırsız Polis (2005), Kibar Necmi
- Bir İstanbul Masalı (2003), Demir Arhan
- Bana Abi De (2002), Yiğit
- Havada Bulut (2002), Necip
- Aslı ile Kerem (2002), Kerem
- Koçum Benim (2002), Umut
- Dünya Varmış (2001), Çetin
- İkinci Bahar (Second Spring, 1998), Ulaş
- Çiçeği Büyütmek (1998)

=== Advertisements ===
- ING Bank (2018)
- Garanti BBVA (2013)
- Lipton (2013)
- Turkcell (2001)

== Awards ==
- Most Promising Young Actor at the 22nd SİYAD (Film Critics Association) Turkish Cinema Awards (for the role of Mehmet in Balalayka).
- Special Jury Award at the 10th ÇASOD (Contemporary Cinema Actors Association) Actor Awards (for one of the roles in Ümit Ünal's film Dokuz; awarded together with Serra Yılmaz, Cezmi Baskın, Ali Poyrazoğlu, Fikret Kuşkan, Rafa Radomisli and Esin Pervane).
