= Ömer Vargı =

Turkish film director and producer

Ömer Vargı is a Turkish film director and producer. He has directed films like Everything's Gonna Be Great in 1998, For Love and Honor in 2007, Anadolu Kartalları in 2011. He also produced Lovelorn in 2005.
