= Özkan Uğur =

Turkish musician and actor (1953–2023)

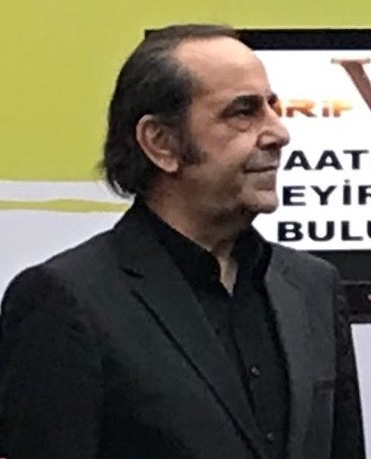
- Uğur in 2018

Background information
- Born: Raif Özkan Uğur; 17 October 1953; Istanbul, Turkey
- Died: 8 July 2023 (aged 69) Istanbul, Turkey
- Genres: Pop, rock
- Occupations: Musician, actor
- Instruments: Bass guitar Electric Guitar, Acoustic Guitar
- Years active: 1970–2023
- Formerly of: MFÖ

Raif Özkan Uğur (17 October 1953 – 8 July 2023) was a Turkish pop and rock musician, member of the renowned band MFÖ and actor. After starting his career in 1970, he became a founding member of Kurtalan Ekspres in 1972, which included Barış Manço. After switching several bands for the next few years, Uğur formed MFÖ together with Mazhar Alanson and Fuat Güner in 1980.

Uğur started acting in 1983 in theatrical plays of Ferhan Şensoy, later acting in movies and TV series as well, most notably in Cennet Mahallesi, Poyraz Karayel and films of Cem Yılmaz. Uğur died in 2023 of complications of lymphoma, which he was diagnosed with in 2013.

== Early life ==
Raif Özkan Uğur was born on 17 October 1953 in Istanbul, Turkey. He was the fifth child of the family. Uğur started playing the mandolin in primary school. While attending the Fenerbahçe High School, he founded an amateur band named Atomikler.

== Music career ==
=== Early years ===
Özkan Uğur started his professional career in 1970 with the Şerif Yüzbaşıoğlu Orchestra as a bass guitarist. In 1971, he met Mazhar Alanson and Fuat Güner, and joined their band named Kaygısızlar. When the group dissolved in 1972, he joined Barış Manço in the Anatolian rock band Kurtalan Ekspres as a founding member. When the group temporarily dissolved when Manço left to complete his mandatory military service, Uğur formed Ter together with two others. Erkin Koray later joined the group. He came back to Kurtalan Ekspres from 1973 to 1974 after Manço returned from the military.

In 1974, Uğur appeared in one of the albums of the Alanson and Güner duo. In the same year, he joined Dostlar Orkestrası, but left it due to disagreements within the group and switched to Ersen ve Dadaşlar. The band collaborated with Selda Bağcan for one album. He joined Alanson and Güner again in 1975 in İpucu Beşlisi. Uğur briefly returned to Kurtalan Ekspres in 1976, but later formed Grup Karma in 1978.

=== MFÖ ===
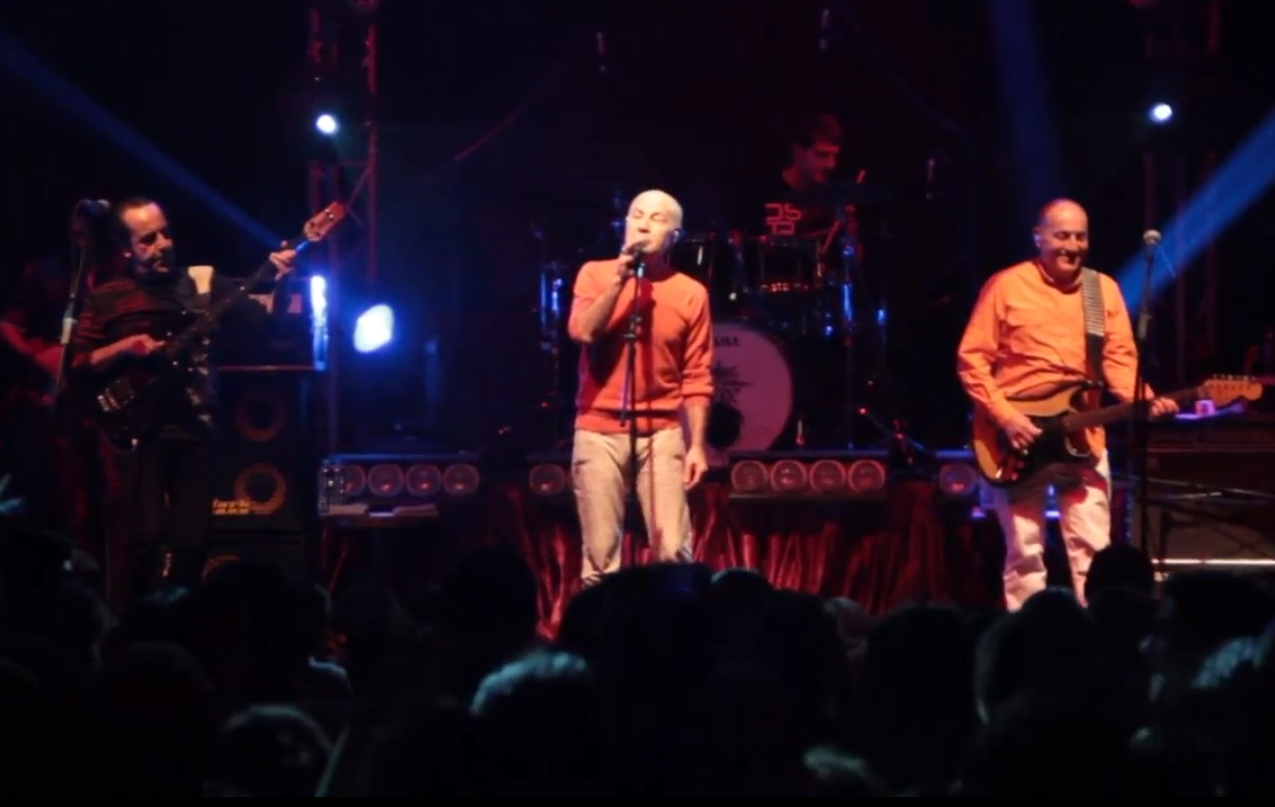
Özkan Uğur (left) with MFÖ in 2012

Uğur returned to working with Alanson and Güner for a fourth time in 1980. The trio formed the band Mazhar Fuat Özkan, which was later shortened to MFÖ. The band released their first album in 1984. Together with MFÖ, Uğur represented Turkey in the Eurovision Song Contest twice: in 1985 with "Didai didai dai" where they finished 14th, and in 1988 with "Sufi" when they placed 15th. In 2017, the group released their first album in 5 years. Uğur was the only member of the band to not have released a solo album.

== Acting ==
Özkan Uğur starred in several theatrical plays, movies and TV series after starting his music career.

Uğur started acting for the first time in 1983 together with Fuat Güner, when they composed songs for and played in two theatrical plays of Ferhan Şensoy. Uğur starred in his first movie, Arkadaşım Şeytan, in 1988. He is known for playing the character Beter Ali in Cennet Mahallesi. In 2015, Uğur joined the Poyraz Karayel cast, starring as İsmail Karayel, the father of the main character. Additionally, he played in Cem Yılmaz' movies G.O.R.A., A.R.O.G and Arif V 216 in 2004, 2008 and 2018 respectively.

== Personal life and death ==
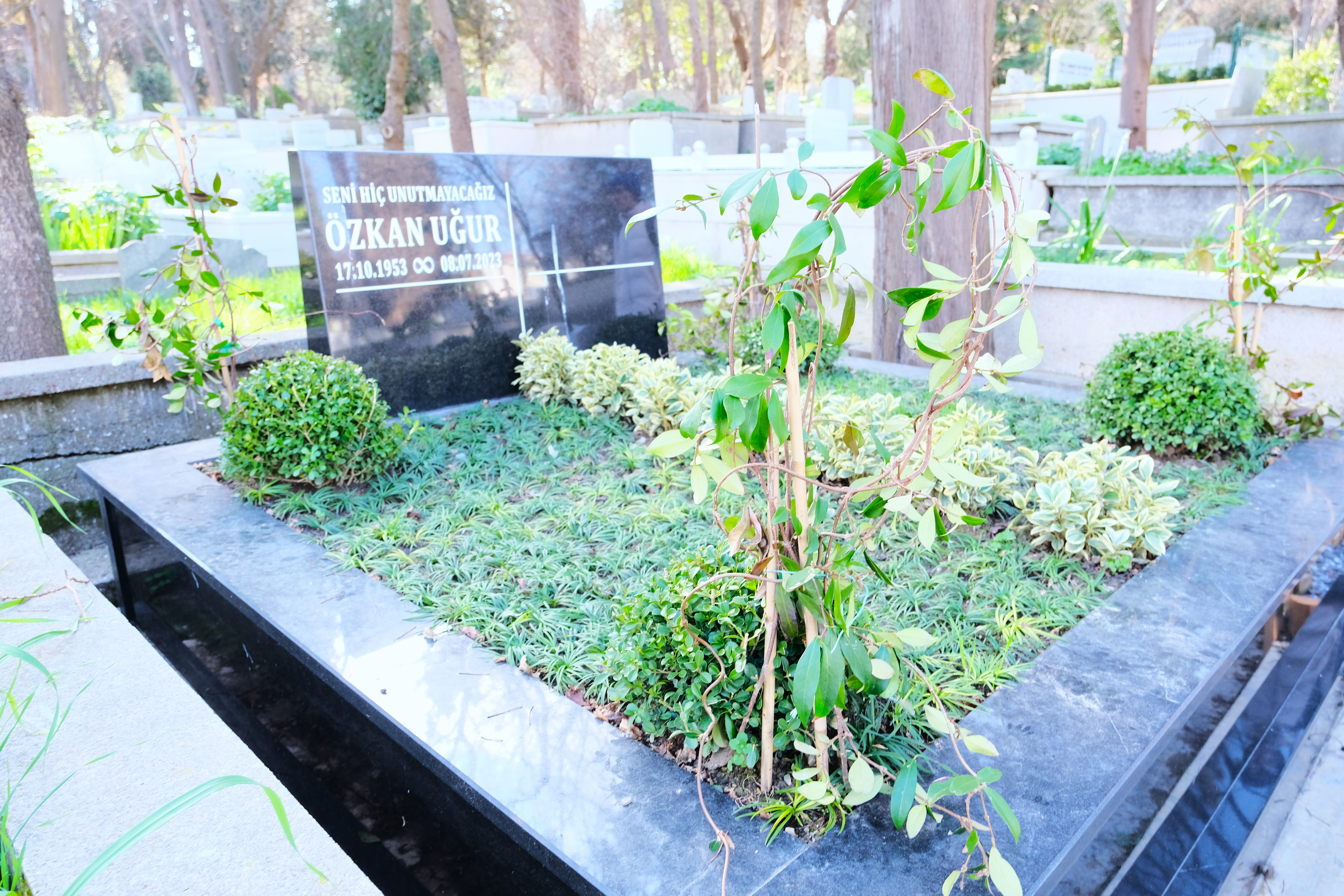
Özkan Uğur's grave in Karacaahmet Cemetery

Uğur married dancing instructor Aysun Aslan in 1989. They had a son together.

In 2013, Uğur was diagnosed with lymphoma. In July 2020, Uğur defeated cancer for a second time. Due to his illness, he had to visit the doctor every six months for a check-up. In April 2022, he announced that he was diagnosed with cancer for a third time, which was successfully treated again, but harmed his organs. In 2020 and 2023, during the times when his condition worsened, misinformation was spread on social media claiming that Uğur had died. In late June 2023, it was announced that Uğur was intubated and placed in an intensive care unit. On 8 July 2023, he died at a hospital in Istanbul, at the age of 69. On 11 July 2023, he was interred at Karacaahmet Cemetery in Istanbul.

== Discography ==
Barış Manço & Kurtalan Ekspres

- 1972: Ölüm Allah'ın Emri / Gamzedeyim Deva Bulmam
- 1973:
  - Gönül Dağı / Hey Koca Topçu
  - Nazar Eyle / Gülme Ha Gülme

Erkin Koray & Ter

- 1972: Hor Görme Garibi / Züleyha

Mazhar-Fuat

- 1974: Türküz Türkü Çağırırız (LP)

Edip Akbayram & Dostlar Orkestrası

- 1974: Garip / Kaşların Karasına

Ersen & Dadaşlar

- 1975:
  - Dostlar Merhaba / Ne Sevdiğin Belli Ne Sevmediğin
  - Gafil Gezme Şaşkın / Güzele Bak Güzele
- 1976: Ekmek Parası / Zalim

Selda & Dadaşlar

- 1976: Türkülerimiz (LP)

Seyhan Karabay & Kardaşlar

- 1976: Kan Davası / Dam Üstünde Çul Serer

İpucu Beşlisi

- 1976: Heyecanlı / Hop Otur Hop Kalk

Grup Karma

- 1978: İmkansız / Mutlu Mu Gülenler

MFÖ

== Filmography ==
=== Television series ===
Year	Title (Note: Excludes guest appearances.)	Role	Ref.
1998–2000	Second Spring	Şecahattin Dürüst	
2004	Cennet Mahallesi	Beter Ali	
2010	Türk Malı		
2011	Bir Ömür Yetmez	Kemal Sertel	
2012	Şubat	Samim Akça	
2015–2016	Poyraz Karayel	İsmail Karayel	

=== Film ===
Year	Title	Role	Ref.
1988	Arkadaşım Şeytan	Okan	
1996	The Bandit	Sedat	
2000	Commissar Shakespeare		
2004	G.O.R.A.	Garavel	
2006	Kısık Ateşte 15 Dakika	Fazıl	
2008	A.R.O.G	Dimi	
2009	Yahşi Batı	Kızılkayalar	
2014	Coming Soon	Ejder Kahraman	
2018	Arif V 216	Garavel	
2019	Karakomik Filmler	İbrahim	
2020	Karakomik Filmler 2		
2022	The Life and Movies of Erşan Kuneri	Dimitri	
