= A.R.O.G =

- Film poster
- Directed by: Cem Yılmaz; Ali Taner Baltacı
- Written by: Cem Yılmaz
- Produced by: Cem Yılmaz; Murat Akdilek
- Starring: Cem Yılmaz; Özge Özberk; Zafer Algöz; Özkan Uğur; Nil Karaibrahimgil
- Cinematography: Soykut Turan
- Music by: Jingle House
- Distributed by: United International Pictures
- Release date: 5 December 2008
- Running time: 128 minutes
- Country: Turkey
- Language: Turkish
- Budget: US$8.5 million
- Box office: 30,424,262 TL

A.R.O.G: A Prehistoric Film (Turkish: A.R.O.G: Bir Yontma Taş Filmi) is a 2008 Turkish science-fiction comedy film, directed by Cem Yılmaz and Ali Taner Baltacı, about a used carpet salesman who is sent back in time by an old interplanetary adversary out for revenge. The film, which went on nationwide general release across Turkey on December 5, 2008, was the highest grossing Turkish films of 2008 and is one of the most expensive Turkish films ever made. It is a sequel to G.O.R.A. (2004) and was followed by the sequel Arif V 216 (2018).

== Plot ==
Arif is awaiting his first child with Ceku. Meanwhile, Commander Logar escapes prison and goes to Earth. He feigns contrition to Arif and offers him his spaceship when Ceku asks Arif if they can visit Gora. At the hangar where the spaceship is stored, Logar captures Arif and reveals his plan to steal Ceku by disguising himself as Arif, before sending the latter back in time.

Arif ends up one million years in the past and gets captured by hunters belonging to a tribe called Arog, led by Dimi. Arog, which produces advanced technologies, is revealed to be constantly bullied by a rival tribe led by Kaaya, who suppresses all sorts of innovations after his father, Kumo, died after he was caught in a flame trail from a visiting Goran spaceship. Since then Kaaya has been raiding neighboring tribes for slaves to build a tower in the hopes of reaching his father in heaven. Arif, who is surrendered to Kaaya, is sent to lay a stone at the extremely high tower. He is released after he becomes the first person to descend safely from the summit. That night, Kaaya’s son, Taso, whom Arif earlier treated for an injury, shows Arif his suppressed artistic side and shows him a cave where Kaaya keeps innovations he had confiscated. They are caught and banished after Taso rejects Kaaya’s attempt to force an arranged marriage on him.

Arif and Taso return to Arog, where Taso reveals he is in love with Dimi’s daughter Mimi. Arif rouses Arog to defy Kaaya. Arif and Taso’s raid Kaaya’s cave and retrieve the technologies inside to revive Arog while Arif helps Taso and Mimi’s budding romance. In revenge, Kaaya thrashes Arog while Arif, Taso and Mimi are away. Seeking to stop Kaaya, Arif convinces him to settle his differences with Arog through a football game, only to be shocked when Kaaya reveals that his tribe has been playing football in honor of Kumo, who received a ball from the Goran visitor who inadvertently killed him.

Arif manages to assemble a ragtag team that includes him, Taso and Dimi. The game initially goes badly for Arif, with one of his players inadvertently falling into a fiery pit and another being abducted by a pterodactyl as he is about to score a goal. Arif then asks Mimi to break a loaf of bread over his head, restoring his superhuman activities and enabling him to win the match. Arif gains the respect of Kaaya, who grants his blessing to Taso and Mimi’s marriage. Fearing a break in the time-space continuum, Arif prepares to leave and gives his watch to Taso as a wedding gift, but is interrupted by Ceku’s arrival. Ceku reveals that she saw through Logar’s ruse and realized that Arif is in the past after his wedding ring and writings to Ceku are discovered at an archaeological dig. As the two return to their own timeline, Logar arrives in Arog, but is immediately devoured by a T-rex.

== Main cast ==
- Cem Yılmaz - Arif/Kaaya/Logar
- Özge Özberk - Ceku
- Özkan Uğur - Dimi
- Nil Karaibrahimgil - Mimi
- Zafer Algöz - Karga/Doctor
- Ozan Güven - Taşo
- Hasan Kaçan - Cuhara
- Nil Karaibrahimgil - Mimi
- Rıdvan Dilmen - Rıdvan Dilmen
- Hasan Kaçan - Cuhara
- Metin Keçeci - Meto
- Muhittin Korkmaz - Bidi
- Cem Korkmaz - Mağara Nöbetçisi
- Sabri Günay - T-Rex
- Ethel Mulinas - Ayu
- Emre Demirkapı - Atomix
- Kaan Öztop - Köylü
- İlker Ayrık - Esnaf

== See also ==
- List of films featuring dinosaurs
