= The Clown and His Daughter =

The Clown and His Daughter (Turkish: Sinekli Bakkal) is a famous book written by Halide Edip Adıvar. It was published in English in 1935, in London. After that, it was translated to Turkish and published in the newspaper Haber. It was published as a book in 1936. It has been translated into many languages.

== Translations ==
Deutsch: Die Tochter des Schattenspielers. By Renate Orth-Guttmann. Zürih (Manesse Bibliothek der Weltliteratur) 2008. ISBN 978-3-7175-2164-8
