= Second Spring (TV series) =

Turkish television series

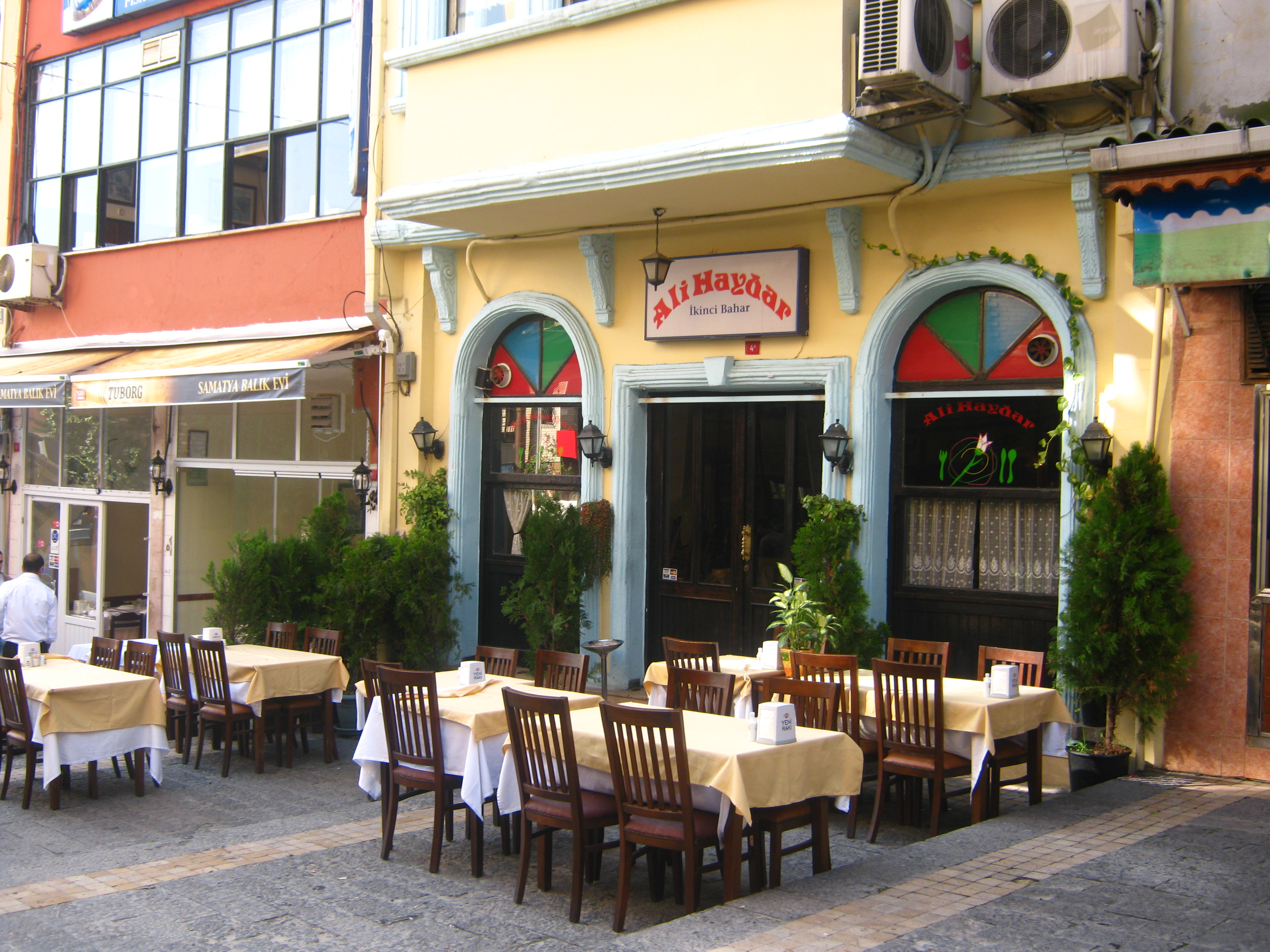
- Ali Haydar's restaurant in Samatya
- Also known as: İkinci Bahar
- Genre: Drama
- Written by: Sulhi Dölek
- Starring: Şener Şen; Türkan Şoray; Tarık Pabuççuoğlu; Many others
- Theme music composer: Vedat Sakman
- Country of origin: Turkey
- No. of seasons: 3
- No. of episodes: 37

Production
- Producers: Directed by Uğur Yücel; Orhan Oğuz; Türkan Derya
- Production company: Most Production

Original release
- Network: ATV
- Release: 29 October 1998 – 11 January 2001

Second Spring (Turkish: İkinci Bahar) is a Turkish television series, broadcast between 1998 and 2001 by ATV. It had record-breaking Turkish Tv series for that time. First 8 episodes appeared between 29 October 1998 – 20 May 1999 (with some reruns). The next 15 episodes were between 17 February-25 May 2000 and the last 14 episodes were between 21 September 2000 – 11 January 2001. There were also reruns; in 2007 by Fox TV and in 2011-2012 by Star TV.

== The name of the series ==
In Turkish, the phrase "Second Spring" refers to middle age romance. The main characters in the series, Ali Haydar and Hanım as well as the main antagonists Vakkas and Neriman are middle age characters. But there are young characters too. For example, Ali Haydar has three daughters, Hanım has a daughter and a son.

== Plot ==
The scene is a market place in Samatya neighbourhood of Istanbul. There are a number of stories interrelated to each other. Ali Haydar, a widower, is a kebap restaurant owner. (Kebap is grilled meat) Hanım, also a widow, is his female meze cook (Meze is a group of small dishes served during the meal). Ali Haydar soon falls in love with Hanım. But the situation is complicated, because his landlady Neriman an ex-actress whom Ali Haydar is in dept, too wants to marry Ali Haydar. Another problem of Ali Haydar is Vakkas, the owner of a rival restaurant whose father was Ali Haydar's tutor. Vakkas tries everything to ruin Ali Haydar with financial plots. While the fathers are struggling, Ali Haydar's elder daughter Melek and Vakkas' son Medet are secretly planning to marry. Cennet, Ali Haydar's second daughter decides not to show up in her graduation ball because she doesn't know how to dance. But Tim, a tourist working as an aide in Haydar's restaurant volunteers to teach her how to dance. Hanım has different problems. Her daughter Gülsüm who has an affair with a wealthy man, gets pregnant and her son Ulaş is planning to migrate to United States illegally. Meanwhile, Secaattin (Şeco for short), Neriman's brother, a zabıta (municipal police) whom all shopkeepers hate, is trying to fix problems with his ex-wife (who is his superior in the office) and his son.

== Cast ==
There are more than 30 characters. The important ones are as follows.

Name of the Character	Position	Played by
Hanım	Meze cook	Türkan Şoray
Ali Haydar	Restaurant owner	Şener Şen
Vakkas	Rival restaurant owner	Settar Tanrıöğen (Note: First season) Tarık Pabuççuoğlu (Note: Second and third seasons)
Neriman	Ali Haydar's landlady	Güven Hokna
Şecaattin (Şeco)	Neriman's brother, police	Özkan Uğur
Zülfikar	Ali Haydar's father	Arif Erkin Güzelbeyoğlu
Melek	Ali Haydar's elder daughter	Yasemin Conka
Cennet	Ali Haydar's second daughter	Devin Özgür Çınar
Huriye	Ali Haydar's third daughter	Merve Er
Medet	Vakkas’ son	Nedim Saban
Timothy	A tourist, working in the restaurant	Tan Sağtürk
Davut	Hanım's father	Bülent Oran
Gülsüm	Hanım's daughter	Nurgül Yeşilçay
Ulaş	Hanım's son	Ozan Güven
Tansu	Secaattin's ex-wife	Nazlı Tosunoğlu
Timuçin	Şecaattin's son	Barış Dinçel
Murat	Gülsüm's young man	Devrim Nas
Basri	A shop keeper (electrician)	Cezmi Baskın
Melahat	A shop keeper (butcher)	Meral Okay

== Gallery ==
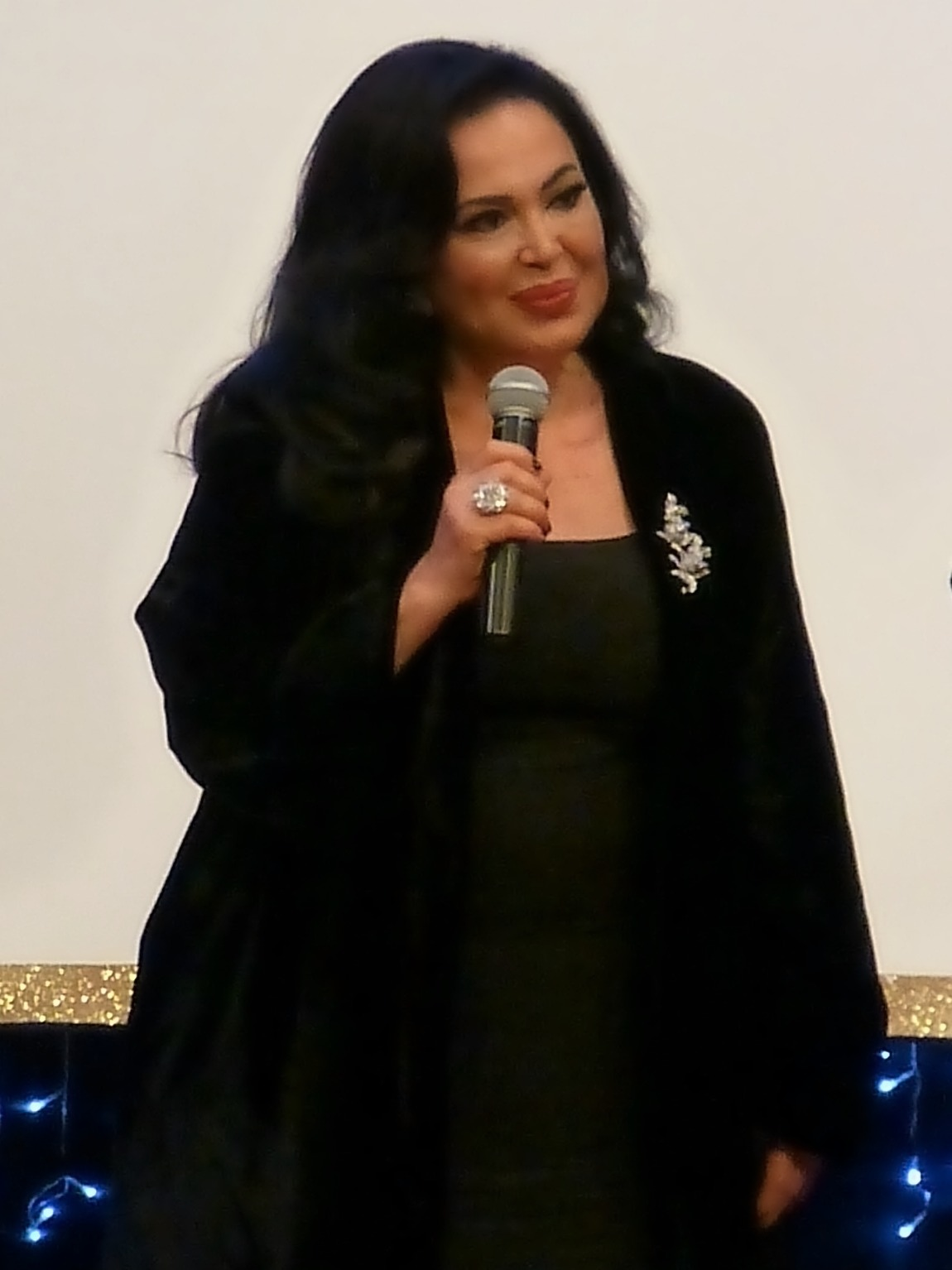
Türkan Şoray (Hanım)

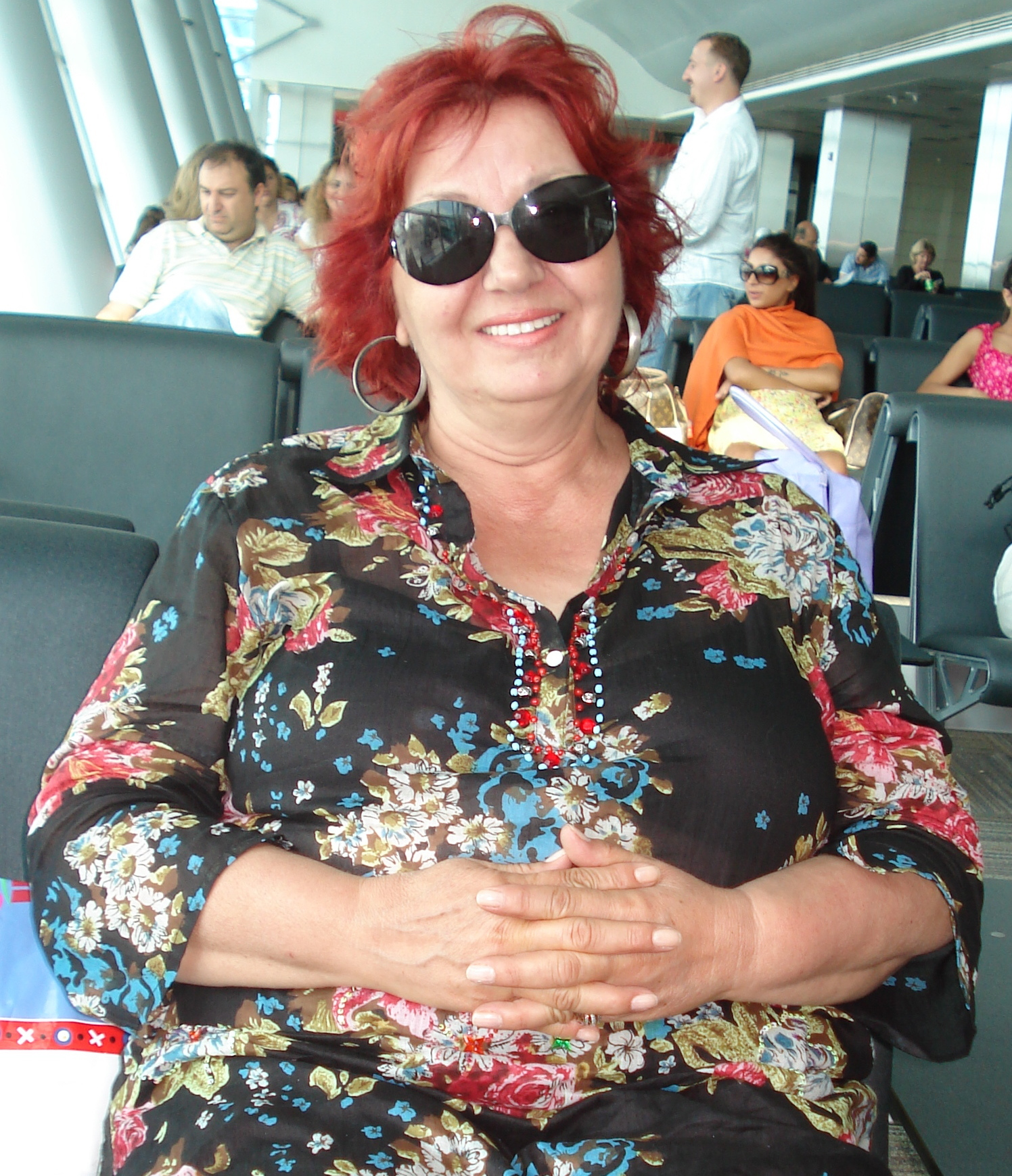
Güven Hokna (Neriman)

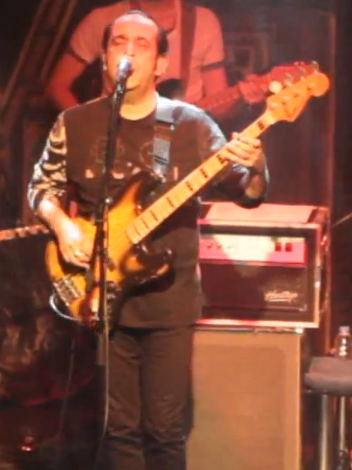
Özkan Uğer (Şeco)

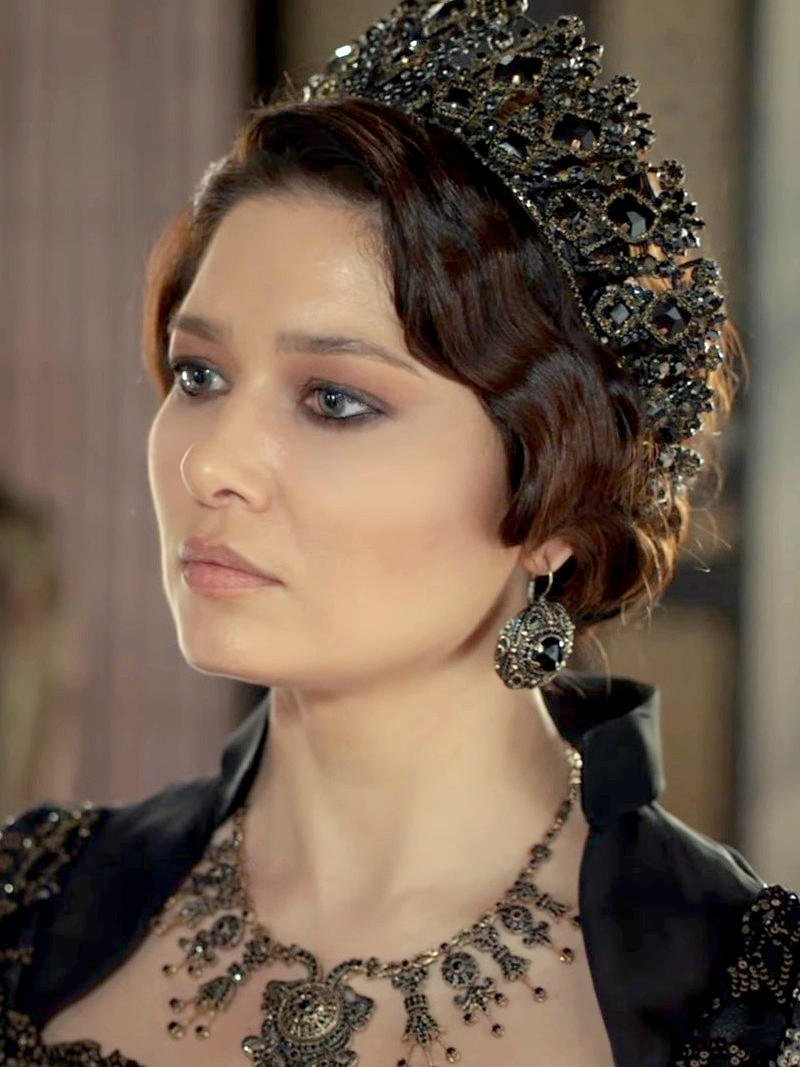
Nurgül Yeşilçay (Gülsüm)

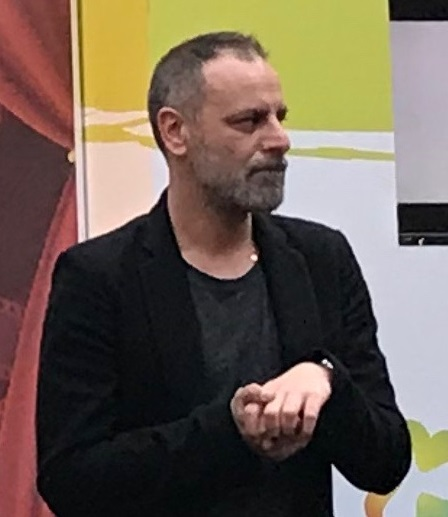
Ozan Güven (Ulaş)

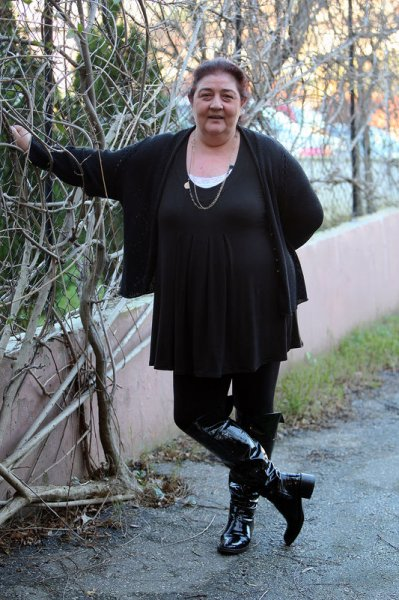
Meral Okay (Butcher)

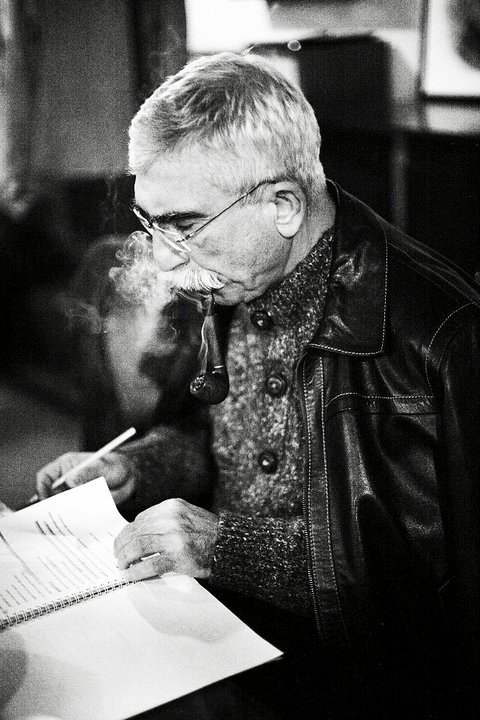
Cezmi Baskın (Electrician)

== Trivia ==
In 1998 Şener Şen and Türkay Şoray were already well known stars. But the series promoted artists who played some of the young characters such as Nurgül Yeşilçay, Ozan Güven and Devin Özgür Çınar. Also Özkan Uğur who was known as a music star and Tan Sağtürk who was known as a ballet made names as the new faces in Turkish film industry.
