= Coming Soon (2014 film) =

- Film poster
- Directed by: Cem Yılmaz
- Written by: Cem Yılmaz
- Produced by: Cem Yılmaz; Muzaffer Yildirim
- Starring: Cem Yılmaz; Tülin Özen
- Cinematography: Gökhan Atilmis
- Edited by: Erhan Acar Jr. Ilker Özcan
- Music by: Jingle House
- Production companies: CMYLMZ Fikirsanat; Nulook Production
- Distributed by: Warner Bros. Pictures
- Release date: 2 October 2014
- Running time: 134 minutes
- Country: Turkey
- Language: Turkish

Coming Soon (Turkish: Pek Yakında) is a 2014 Turkish comedy film directed by Cem Yılmaz.

The film, which premiered on September 30, 2014, was released in theaters on October 2, 2014. It was viewed by 2,187,278 people across Turkey. This is the third film both written and directed by Cem Yılmaz.

== Story ==
Believing that he has taken the easiest path in life, just as he did with the money he earned from pirated DVDs, Zafer faces a challenge for the first time when his wife Arzu decides to separate. Tired of her husband's illegal activities, Arzu decides to divorce, having left her television acting career and set aside her dreams of the big screen after their marriage. To keep his family from falling apart, Zafer decides to return to the film industry as a producer, after his acting career had previously ended in minor roles. Secretly producing a film titled Şahikalar - Kötülüğün Sonu (The End of Evil), Zafer aims both to prove he has left his unlawful activities behind and to restore Arzu's dreams, which she had abandoned for their marriage.

== Cast ==
- Cem Yılmaz as Zafer Yildiz/Besir
- Tülin Özen as Arzu
- Ozan Güven as Bogac Boray
- Özkan Uğur as Ejder
- Zafer Algöz as Ahben
- Çağlar Çorumlu as Zeki
- Ayşen Gruda as Remziye
