= Özge Özberk =

Turkish actress

- Born: 13 August 1976 (age 48); Istanbul, Turkey
- Occupation: Actress
- Years active: 1993–present
- Spouse: Hayim Sadioğlu (m. 2007; div. 2012)
- Children: 1

Özge Özberk (born 13 August 1976) is a Turkish actress who has acted in many films, television series and plays.

== Biography ==
Özge Özberk was born in Istanbul, Turkey in 1976. Her brother is actor, Özgür Özberk. She studied theater at Istanbul University and Mujdat Gezen Arts Centre.

She gained recognition with her role in the franchise sci-fi comedy film series GORA. Her period roles are in 'Çemberimde Gül Oya', 'Kırık Kanatlar', 'Babam ve Oğlum', 'Mavi Gözlü Dev', '120', 'Neredesin Firuze'.

She had main roles in Geniş Zamanlar and Sinekli Bakkal based from novels. She played in series Yol Arkadaşım and film 'Bizi Hatırla' directed by Çağan Irmak.

She stars in teen comedy drama Pis Yedili and crime youth series Gelsin Hayat Bildiği Gibi. In 2017, she started a new TV series "Kalbimdeki Deniz" as "Deniz". She had guest roles in hit series such as 'Bizimkiler', 'Kadın İsterse', 'Bir Demet Tiyatro', 'Şaban Askerde'.

== Filmography ==
Film
Title	Year	Role	Network
2000	Yıldız Tepe		-
2004	G.O.R.A.	Princess Ceku	-
2005	Babam ve Oğlum	Birgül	-
2007	Mavi Gözlü Dev	Münevver	-
2008	120	Münire	-
2008	A.R.O.G	Princess Ceku	-
2008	Hakimiyet		-
2012	N'apcaz Şimdi?	Nalan	-
2015	Evlenmeden Olmaz	Zeynep	-
2018	Arif V 216	Ceku	-
2018	Bizi Hatırla	Ece	-
2023	Do Not Disturb		Netflix
Television program
Title	Year	Role	Network
1997, 2006	Bir Demet Tiyatro		Star TV & atv
TV Series
Title	Year	Role	Network
1989	Bizimkiler		Star TV, TRT1 & Show TV
1993	Şaban Askerde		Star TV
1995	Bizim Ev		TGRT
1999	Sır Dosyası		Star TV
2004	Çemberimde Gül Oya		Kanal D
2004	Dayı		Kanal D
2004	Kadın İsterse		Star TV & Show TV
2006	Kırık Kanatlar	Nazlı	Kanal D
2007	Geniş Zamanlar	Zehra Mercan	Star TV
2007	Sinekli Bakkal	Rabia	atv
2008	Kolay Gelsin		Kanal 1 (Turkey)
2008–2009	Yol Arkadaşım	Ayla Elmastaş	Kanal D & Star TV
2011	Canım Babam	Cansu	Show TV
2011–2013	Pis Yedili	Filiz Öğretmen	Show TV
2014	Hayat Ağacı	Ayşen	TRT 1
2016–2018	Kalbimdeki Deniz	Deniz Öztuna	FOX
2020	Bir Annenin Günahı	Suna	Kanal D
2022–2023	Gelsin Hayat Bildiği Gibi	Derya Yılmaz	Show TV
2023–	Dilek Taşı	Rüçhan Rona	Kanal D
