= Kirpi (film) =

2009 Turkish comedy film

- Directed by: Erdal Murat Aktaş
- Written by: Erdal Murat Aktaş; Atay Sözer based on a novel by Sulhi Dölek
- Starring: Mazhar Alanson; Güven Kıraç
- Music by: Benjamin Beladi - Michael Vickerage
- Release date: 2009
- Running time: 97 min.
- Language: Turkish

Kirpi (“Hedgehog”) is a Turkish comedy film. It is based on a novel by Sulhi Dölek. Dölek died in 2005 and upon his last request, the novel was adopted in to a movie in 2009.

== Plot ==
Reşat is a nervous and vindictive character. Whenever he feels he has been hard done by, he revenges in satirical plots. These plots are usually harmless but annoying. He likes drawing a hedgehog as his signature. When a stranger jumps the queue while he is paying his bill in a cash office he decides to revenge by frightening him by a fake telephone message. But it turns out that his opponent Tahir is also vindictive. So they began to create plots to make a mockery of each other. But somehow these plots help the police to arrest mafia gang. At the end they make friends with each other.

== Cast ==
Name of the Character	Position	Played by
Reşat	Vindictive character (hedgehog)	Mazhar Alanson
Tahir	Reşat's opponent	Güven Kıraç
Mete	Reşat's boss	İsmail İncekara
Mustak	Reşat's father in law	Zihni Göktay
Nüket	Reşat's wife	Birsen Dürülü
Onur	Reşat's son	Caner Özyurtlu
Nergis	Tahir's wife	Zuhal Topal
”unnamed”	Dedective	Murat Serezli
