= Zafer Algöz =

Turkish actor

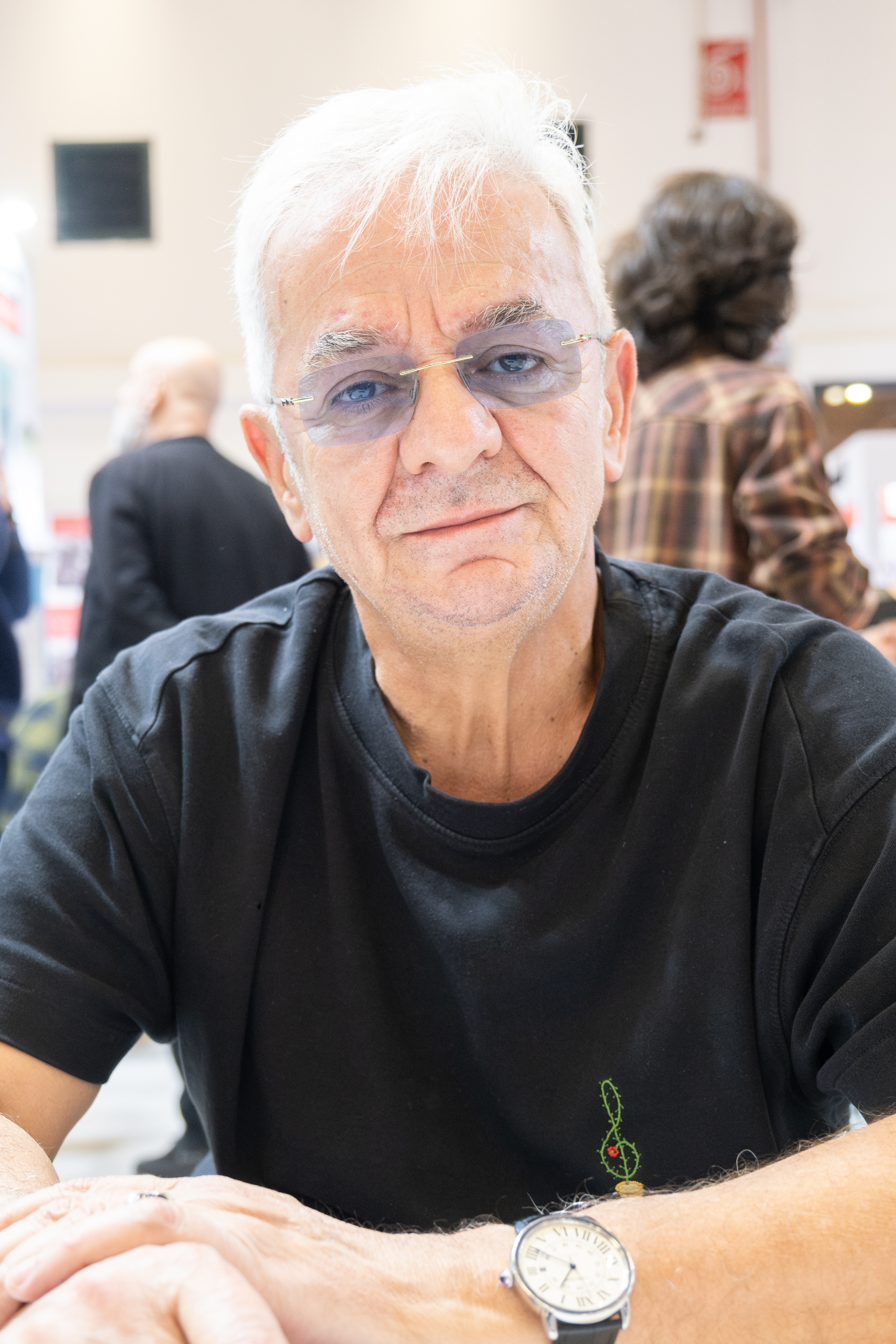
- Algöz in 2025
- Born: 30 August 1961 (age 65); Kars, Turkey
- Education: Ankara State Conservatory
- Occupations: Theatre and movie actor
- Years active: 1985–present
- Spouse: Lale Algöz

Zafer Algöz (born 30 August 1961) is a Turkish actor, best known for his films Salkım Hanımın Taneleri (1999), A.R.O.G (2008) and Yahşi Batı (2010).

== Biography ==
He began acting classes in 1975, which were held by Bursa State Theatre. In 1980, he attended Ankara State Conservatory Department of Theatre, graduating in 1985. In the same year, he began his acting career at Bursa State Theatre.

In 1989, Algöz was appointed to Istanbul State Theatre. He has played several roles. Also he has appeared in many films and television shows. Currently, he works at Istanbul State Theatre.

== Personal life ==
Algöz is known supporter of Beşiktaş JK. Many of his anecdotes in his books (like Haşırt Dı Bilekbord) feature stories about Beşiktaş matches and the legendary figures of the club. In 2012, he was jokingly (but with some serious fan backing) suggested as a candidate for the club's presidency.

Beyond his writing, Algöz has contributed to the club's terrace culture. In 2015, alongside musician Hakan Altun and actor Umut Kurt, he wrote a popular chant dedicated to striker Demba Ba. The song, an adaptation of Müslüm Gürses' "Hangimiz Sevmedik," became a viral success and was widely adopted by the Beşiktaş supporters.

== Awards ==
- 10th Lions Theatre Awards, 2010, Best Comedy Actor, God of Carnage

== Theatre ==
- Hamlet, William Shakespeare - Istanbul State Tiyatrosu
- Amadeus, Peter Shaffer - Istanbul State Theatre
- Macbeth, William Shakespeare - Istanbul State Theatre
- God of Carnage, Yasmina Reza - Istanbul State Theatre
- Long Live Comedy, Anton Chekhov - Istanbul State Theatre
- Black comedy, Peter Shaffer - Istanbul State Theatre
- The Resistible Rise of Arturo Ui, Bertolt Brecht - Istanbul
- Münasebetsiz, Francis Veber - Donkişot Tiyatro
- Ay Işığında Şamata, Haldun Taner - Istanbul State Theatre
- Yaşar Ne Yaşar Ne Yaşamaz, Aziz Nesin - Istanbul State Theatre
- Babaanem Yüz Yaşında (La nona), Roberto Cossa

== Filmography ==
Zafer Algöz starred in following films and television series:

Movie

- Her Şey Aşk İçin - 2023
- Do Not Disturb - 2023
- Ayzek ile Bir Gece - 2023
- Karakomik Filmler 2 - 2020
- Karakomik Filmler - 2019
- Börü - 2018
- Görevimiz Tatil - 2018
- Arif V 216 - 2018
- Deli Aşk - 2017
- Kaçma Birader - 2016
- Ali Baba and the Seven Dwarfs - 2015
- Pek Yakında - 2014
- Uzun Hikâye - 2012
- Dedemin İnsanları - 2011
- Umut - 2009
- Yahşi Batı - 2010
- A.R.O.G - 2008
- Sınav - 2006
- Umut Adası - 2006
- O Şimdi Mahkum - 2005
- Duruşma - 1999
- Salkım Hanımın Taneleri - 1999
- Ağır Roman - 1997

Television series

- Kötü Kan - 2024
- Ru - 2024
- Yıldız De Bana - 2023
- The Life and Movies of Erşan Kuneri - 2022
- Üç Kuruş - 2021
- İlginç Bazı Olaylar - 2021
- Tutunamayanlar - 2020
- Muhteşem İkili - 2018
- Hayatımın Aşkı - 2016
- Behzat Ç. Bir Ankara Polisiyesi - 2010
- Leyla ile Mecnun - 2011
- Mor Menekşeler - 2011
- Mükemmel Çift - 2010
- Kurtlar Vadisi Pusu - 2007
- Cumhur Cemaat - 2007
- Hasret - 2006
- Kapıları Açmak - 2005
- Esir Şehrin İnsanları - 2003
- Çınaraltı - 2003
- Cesur Kuşku - 2001
- Akasya Pasajı - 2000
- Evdeki Hesap - 2000
- Utanmaz Adam -
- Komşu Komşu - 1997
- Oğlum Adam Olacak - 1995
- Saygılar Bizden - 1993
