= Balalayka (film) =

- Directed by: Ali Özgentürk
- Written by: Işıl Özgentürk; Rustam Ibragimbekov
- Produced by: Erol Avcı
- Starring: Uğur Yücel; Cem Davran; Yekaterina Rednikova
- Cinematography: Mirsad Herović
- Music by: Aşkın Arsunan
- Distributed by: TMC Film
- Release date: 2000
- Running time: 116 minutes
- Country: Turkey
- Language: Turkish

Balalayka is a 2000 Turkish drama film directed by Ali Özgentürk and written by Işıl Özgentürk and Rustam Ibragimbekov.

== Plot ==
Three brothers, Necati, Hassan and Omer, who have not seen for a long time, going in his native Istanbul to transport from Russia to Turkey remains of his father, who was buried in the USSR. In the preparation of documents in Russia Russian woman Tatiana helps them. In the bus with a group of Russian girls traveling to Turkey to work, Tanya accompanies by three brothers with their weight and at the same time takes with him his young niece Olga disabled for the treatment of her legs in Istanbul hospital. The main intrigue of the film takes place in a bus on the way to Istanbul. A number of obstacles have been giving bus passengers safely get to the city. After crossing the Turkish border on the way to Istanbul Turkish gang of pimps stops the bus and selects among girls future sexual slaves. Seeing Tanya's young niece - Olya, gang leader insists on its issuance, and there intercedes Tanya.

== Cast ==
- Uğur Yücel as Necati
- Cem Davran as Hasan
- Yekaterina Rednikova as Tanya
- Ercan Yazgan
- Ozan Güven as Mehmet
- Atılay Uluışık
- Necdet Yakın
- İskender Bağcılar

Kemal Sunal, a well-known Turkish actor, would have been part of the cast (as Necati) of Balalayka; however, he died from a heart attack minutes before the plane set off to Trabzon, where the film was being shot.
