= G.O.R.A. =

G.O.R.A
- Film poster
- Directed by: Ömer Faruk Sorak
- Written by: Cem Yılmaz
- Produced by: Nuri Sevin; Necati Akpınar; Gökhan Tuncel
- Starring: Cem Yılmaz; Özge Özberk; Şafak Sezer; Rasim Öztekin; İdil Fırat; Özkan Uğur
- Cinematography: Veli Kuzlu
- Edited by: Böcek Yapım; BKM Film
- Music by: Ozan Çolakoğlu; Sagopa Kajmer; Özkan Uğur
- Distributed by: Beşiktaş Kültür Merkezi (BKM), Böcek Yapım, Böcek Film
- Release date: November 5, 2004
- Country: Turkey
- Language: Turkish
- Box office: 30,805,474 TL

G.O.R.A.: A Space Movie (Turkish: G.O.R.A.: Bir Uzay Filmi) is a 2004 Turkish science-fiction comedy film, directed by Ömer Faruk Sorak, which stars Cem Yılmaz as a used carpet salesman who is abducted by aliens from the planet G.O.R.A. The film, which went on nationwide general release across Turkey on November 5, 2004, was one of the highest grossing Turkish films of 2004 and was followed by the sequels A.R.O.G (2008) and Arif V 216 (2018). A spin-off series based on Erşan Kuneri's character was released in 2022 by Netflix.

== Plot ==
Arif makes a living by selling carpets and fake images of U.F.Os. One day, he is abducted by aliens disguised as Prince Charles along with other humans. This abduction is carried out by planet G.O.R.A's security chief Logar Trihis as a grudge for the rape of an ancestor's colleague who visited Earth in 1789. On the spaceship, Arif comes across a hologram image of Garavel who tells Arif that he can sense the Force within him (a spoof reference to Star Wars) and instructs Arif to look for him.

Upon landing on G.O.R.A, Arif continues to look for opportunities to escape but repeatedly fails. He builds up a friendship with inmates Faruk, who is also the prison chef, and Robot-216. Robot-216 is a close confidant of Princess Ceku who is detained by Logar. It is revealed that Logar plans to usurp the throne by marrying Ceku despite her stubborn refusal. To carry out his plan, he sets a fireball towards G.O.R.A and asks for Ceku's hand in return for saving the planet. Ceku's father, King Tocha, is forced to agree as the alternative option of using a sacred stone is hindered by the absence of the manual, which was stolen by Logar. But when Logar fails to launch his weapon, Arif comes to the rescue by performing a ritual spoofing The Fifth Element.

Logar is furious as it requires Arif to kiss Ceku. This leads him to blackmail King Tocha into agreeing Ceku's marriage with him. However, Ceku learns from her mother that her real father is in fact an earthling. She sets off to find him with Arif, Faruk and Robot-216. But along the way, Logar's men recapture Ceku. At the same time, Arif meets Garavel who is an old acquaintance of Ceku's father, who is revealed to have been a Turkish Air Force pilot who was abducted in 1978. With Garavel's help, Arif gains special powers and storms Tocha's castle to rescue Ceku during her engagement party with Logar. After a fight scene spoofing The Matrix, Arif defeats Logar and exposes his sinister plans to everybody. Arif and Ceku, who profess their love, return to Earth and live as a couple, but Arif continues to be disbelieved when he provides photos of his extraterrestrial experience.

== Cast ==
- Cem Yılmaz – Arif Işık/Commander Logar Trihis
- Rasim Öztekin – Bob Marley Faruk
- Özkan Uğur – Garavel
- İdil Fırat – Mulu
- Şafak Sezer – Kuna
- Özge Özberk – Princess Ceku Lamtschina
- Erdal Tosun – Rendroy
- Ozan Güven – 216-Robot
- Cezmi Baskın – Superior Tocha

== Reception ==
=== Reviews ===
Todd Brown, writing for Twitch Film, describes the film as, "a very funny, very Mel Brooks inspired sci-fi comedy", with "some pitch perfect knocks on both Star Wars and The Matrix films in there" that "looked good...went on to become a huge hit in its native country", and "re-introduced Turkish genre film to international audiences as it rolled out on the festival circuit", proving that Turkey "was capable of producing big, glossy productions with the very best of them".
