= 3rd Yeşilçam Awards =

- Awards logo
- Date: March 23, 2010
- Location: Lütfi Kırdar Congress & Exhibition Hall
- Country: Turkey
- Presented by: Turkish Foundation of Cinema and Audiovisual Culture (TÜRSAK); Beyoğlu Municipality
- Hosted by: Meltem Cumbul
- Website: http://www.yesilcamodulleri.com.tr/

Television/radio coverage
- Network: NTV Turkey

The 3rd Yeşilçam Awards (Turkish: 3. Yeşilçam Ödülleri), presented by the Turkish Foundation of Cinema and Audiovisual Culture (TÜRSAK) and Beyoğlu Municipality, honored the best Turkish films of 2009 and took place on March 23, 2010, at the Lütfi Kırdar Congress and Exhibition Hall in Istanbul, Turkey. Veteran Turkish actress Filiz Akın received the Special Achievement Award.

== Awards and nominations ==
The nominees were announced at a press conference held on February 22, 2010, in Ghetto.

=== Best Film ===
- Winner: Breath (Turkish: Nefes: Vatan Sağolsun) directed by Levent Semerci
  - I Saw the Sun (Turkish: Güneşi Gördüm) directed by Mahsun Kırmızıgül
  - On the Way to School (Turkish: İki Dil Bir Bavul) directed by Orhan Eskiköy
  - Pandora's Box (Turkish: Pandora’nın Kutusu) directed by Yeşim Ustaoğlu
  - Vavien directed by Yağmur & Durul Taylan

=== Best Director ===
- Winner: Reha Erdem for My Only Sunshine (Turkish: Hayat Var)
  - Levent Semerci for Breath (Turkish: Nefes: Vatan Sağolsun)
  - Mahsun Kırmızıgül for I Saw the Sun (Turkish: Güneşi Gördüm)
  - Yağmur and Durul Taylan for Vavien
  - Yeşim Ustaoğlu for Pandora's Box (Turkish: Pandora’nın Kutusu)
  - Zeki Demirkubuz for Envy (Turkish: Kıskanmak)

=== Best Actor ===
- Winner: Mert Fırat for Love in Another Language (Turkish: Başka Dilde Aşk)
  - Engin Günaydın for Vavien
  - Mete Horozoğlu for Breath (Turkish: Nefes: Vatan Sağolsun)
  - Nadir Sarıbacak for Wrong Rosary (Turkish: Uzak İhtimal)
  - Öner Erkan for Bornova Bornova
  - Yılmaz Erdoğan for Jolly Life (Turkish: Neşeli Hayat)

=== Best Actress ===
- Winner: Binnur Kaya for Vavien
  - Demet Evgar for I Saw the Sun (Turkish: Güneşi Gördüm)
  - Meral Çetinkaya for In Darkness (Turkish: Karanlıktakiler)
  - Nergis Öztürk for Envy (Turkish: Kıskanmak)
  - Nesrin Cevadzade for Dilber's Eight Days (Turkish: Dilber'in Sekiz Günü)
  - Şerif Sezer for Piano Girl (Turkish: Deli Deli Olma)

=== Best Supporting Actor Award ===
- Winner: Cemal Toktaş for I Saw the Sun (Turkish: Güneşi Gördüm)
  - Cezmi Baskın for Jolly Life (Turkish: Neşeli Hayat)
  - Genco Erkal for The Market: A Tale of Trade (Turkish: Pazar: Bir Ticaret Masalı)
  - Mustafa Uzunyılmaz for Bogeyman (Turkish: Mommo)
  - Settar Tanrıöğen for Vavien

=== Best Supporting Actress Award ===
- Winner: Derya Alabora for Pandora's Box (Turkish: Pandora’nın Kutusu)
  - Berrak Tüzünataç for Envy (Turkish: Kıskanmak)
  - Hasibe Eren for The Master (Turkish: Usta)
  - Lale Mansur for Love in Another Language (Turkish: Başka Dilde Aşk)
  - Serra Yılmaz for Vavien

=== Best Cinematography Award ===
- Winner: Soykut Turan for I Saw the Sun (Turkish: Güneşi Gördüm)
  - Florent Henry for Jolly Life (Turkish: Neşeli Hayat)
  - Gökhan Tiryaki for Vavien
  - Hayk Kırakosyan for 7 Husbands for Hurmuz (Turkish: 7 Kocalı Hürmüz)
  - Levent Semerci & Vedat Özdemir for Breath (Turkish: Nefes: Vatan Sağolsun)

=== Best Screenplay Award ===
- Winner: Engin Günaydın for Vavien
  - İnan Temelkuran for Bornova Bornova
  - Levent Semerci, M. İlkay Altınay & Hakan Evrensel for Breath (Turkish: Nefes: Vatan Sağolsun)
  - Yeşim Ustaoğlu for Pandora's Box (Turkish: Pandora’nın Kutusu)
  - Yılmaz Erdoğan for Jolly Life (Turkish: Neşeli Hayat)

=== Best Music Award ===
- Winner: Attila Özdemiroğlu for Vavien
  - Ender Akay & Sunay Özgür for 7 Husbands for Hurmuz (Turkish: 7 Kocalı Hürmüz)
  - Erkan Oğur for Bogeyman (Turkish: Mommo)
  - Mazlum Çimen for Dot (Turkish: Nokta)
  - Yıldıray Gürgen, Tevfik Akbaşlı & Mahsun Kırmızıgül for I Saw the Sun (Turkish: Güneşi Gördüm)

=== Best Young Talent Award ===
- Winner: Elit İşcan for My Only Sunshine (Turkish: Hayat Var)
  - BKM Mutfak Oyuncuları for Jolly Life (Turkish: Neşeli Hayat)
  - Damla Sönmez for Bornova Bornova
  - Onur Ünsal for Pandora's Box (Turkish: Pandora’nın Kutusu)
  - Umut Kurt for Pains of Autumn (Turkish: Güz Sancısı)

=== Turkcell First Film Award ===
- Winner: Breath (Turkish: Nefes: Vatan Sağolsun) directed by Levent Semerci
  - Love in Another Language (Turkish: Başka Dilde Aşk) directed by İlksen Başarır
  - On the Way to School (Turkish: İki Dil Bir Bavul) directed by Orhan Eskiköy
  - Bogeyman (Turkish: Mommo) directed by Atalay Taşdiken
  - Wrong Rosary (Turkish: Uzak İhtimal) directed by Mahmut Fazıl Coşkun

== See also ==
- Yeşilçam Award
- Turkish films of 2009
- 2009 in film
