= List of Turkish films of 2009 =

A list of films produced by the Turkish film industry in Turkey in 2009.

== Highest-grossing films ==
Highest-grossing Turkish films of 2009
Rank	Title	Studio	Gross
1	Recep İvedik 2	Özen Film	$22,372,988
2	Nefes: Vatan Sağolsun	Medyavizyon	$13,011,867
3	Güneşi Gördüm	Pinema	$12,812,281
4	Neşeli Hayat	Cinegroup	$6,366,255
5	Kurtlar Vadisi Gladio	Özen Film	$4,703,086
6	Güz Sancısı	Özen Film	$3,105,177
7	Kadri'nin Götürdüğü Yere Git	Medyavizyon	$2,502,800
8	Kolpaçino	Özen Film	$2,499,501
9	Vali	Medyavizyon	$2,339,823
10	7 Kocalı Hürmüz	Cinegroup	$2,062,369

== Released films ==
=== January – June ===
Opening		Title	Director	Cast	Genre	Notes
J A N	2	Süt	Semih Kaplanoğlu	Melih Selçuk, Başak Köklükaya & Rıza Akın	Drama	
J A N	9	Vali	M. Çağatay Tosun	Erdal Beşikçioğlu, Uğur Polat & İsmail Hacıoğlu	Drama	
J A N	16	Kadri'nin Götürdüğü Yere Git	Onur Tan	Şafak Sezer, Alp Kırşan & Ahmet Mümtaz Taylan	Comedy	
J A N	16	Ayakta Kal	Adnan Güler	Mehmet Aslan, Okan Karacan & Sinem Kobal	Drama	
J A N	23	Güz Sancısı	Tomris Giritlioglu	Murat Yıldırım, Beren Saat & Okan Yalabık	Drama	
J A N	23	Pandora'nın Kutusu	Yeşim Ustaoğlu	Onur Ünsal, Derya Alabora & Tsilla Chelton	Drama	
J A N	30	Kirpi	Erdal Murat Aktaş	Mazhar Alanson, Güven Kıraç & İrem Altuğ	Comedy	
F E B	6	Öldür beni				
F E B	13	Recep İvedik 2	Togan Gökbakar	Şahan Gökbakar, Gülsen Özbakan & Efe Babacan	Comedy	Sequel to Recep İvedik
F E B	20	Havar				
F E B	27	Golgesizler	Ümit Ünal		Drama	
F E B	27	Two Lines (İki Çizgi) Turkish	Selim Evci	Gülçin Santırcıoğlu, Kaan Keskin, Zeynep Aydın, Özgül Koşar, Mehmet Aslan, Perihan Kurtoğlu, Yakup Yavru	Drama	
F E B	27	Umut	Murat Aslan		Drama	
M A R	6	Gökten Üç Elma Düştü				
M A R	6	Yasam arsizi				
M A R	13	Güneşi Gördüm	Mahsun Kırmızıgül	Mahsun Kırmızıgül, Demet Evgar & Altan Erkekli	Drama	
M A R	20	Gölge				
M A R	27	Hayat var				
A P R	3	Yengeç Oyunu: Adalet				
A P R	10	Pazar: Bir Ticaret Masalı				
A P R	17	Deli Deli Olma	Murat Saraçoglu	Tarık Akan, Şerif Sezer & Zuhal Topal	Drama	
A P R	17	Mommo	Atalay Tasdiken	Elif Bülbül, Mehmet Bülbül & Mete Dönmezer	Drama	
A P R	24	Baska semtin çocuklari				
A P R	24	Dilber'in Sekiz Günü				
M A Y	1	Benim ve roz'un sonbahari				
M A Y	1	Kelebek				
M A Y	1	Saddamin askerleri: Kara günes				
M A Y	8	Ali'nin sekiz günü				
M A Y	8	Nokta				
M A Y	8	Usta				
M A Y	15	Adab-ı Muaşeret	Emre Akay	Tarik Ündüz, Hasibe Eren & Salih Kalyon	Comedy	
M A Y	22	Hadigari cumhur				

=== July – December ===
Opening		Title	Director	Cast	Genre	Notes
S E P	18	Çingirakli Top				
S E P	18	Kanimdaki Barut				
S E P	18	Sizi Seviyorum				
S E P	18	Sonsuz				
S E P	25	11'e 10 kala				
O C T	2	Kampüste Çiplak Ayaklar				
O C T	2	Karanliktakiler	Çağan Irmak		Drama	
O C T	9	Acı				
O C T	9	Akamas				
O C T	9	Mazi yarasi				
O C T	9	Uzak İhtimal	Mahmut Fazil Coskun	Nadir Saribacak, Ersan Unsal & Görkem Yeltan	Drama	Tiger Award winner
O C T	16	Nefes: Vatan Sağolsun	Levent Semerci	Mete Horozoğlu, Birce Akalay & İlker Kızmaz	Drama	
O C T	23	Iki Dil Bir Bavul	Ozgür Dogan & Orhan Eskikoy	Emre Aydin, Rojda Huz & Vehip Huz	Documentary	Golden Orange winner
O C T	23	Kanalizasyon	Alper Mestçi	Okan Bayulgen & Erol Günaydın	Comedy	
O C T	23	Melekler ve Kumarbazlar				
O C T	30	Kolpaçino	Atil Inac	Safak Sezer, Aydemir Akbas & Ali Çatalbas	Comedy	
O C T	30	Konak				
N O V	6	Aşk Geliyorum Demez	Murat Seker	Bergüzar Korel, Tolgahan Sayisman & Zeki Alasya	Comedy	
N O V	6	Incir Çekirdegi				
N O V	6	Kıskanmak	Zeki Demirkubuz	Nergis Öztürk, Serhat Tutumluer & Berrak Tüzünataç	Drama	
N O V	6	Mezuniyet				
N O V	13	Bornova Bornova	İnan Temelkuran	Öner Erkan, Kadir Çermik & Damla Sönmez	Drama	Golden Orange winner
N O V	13	The Watercolor	Cihat Hazardagli		Animation	
N O V	20	7 Kocali Hürmüz	Ezel Akay	Nurgül Yeşilçay, Gülse Birsel & Haluk Bilginer	Comedy	
N O V	20	Kurtlar Vadisi Gladio	Sadullah Sentürk	Musa Uzunlar, Tugrul Çetiner & Ayfer Dönmez	Action	
N O V	27	Neşeli Hayat	Yılmaz Erdoğan		Comedy	
N O V	27	Türkler Çildirmis Olmali				
D E C	4	Abimm				
D E C	4	Adini Sen Koy				
D E C	11	Gecenin Kanatları	Serdar Akar	Yavuz Bingöl, Beren Saat & Erkan Petekkaya	Drama	
D E C	11	No Ofsayt				
D E C	18	Acı Aşk	A. Taner Elhan	Ezgi Asaroglu	Drama	
D E C	18	Başka Dilde Aşk	İlksen Başarır	Saadet Işıl Aksoy, Mert Fırat & Lale Mansur	Drama	
D E C	18	Süpürrr!				
D E C	18	Vavien	Yağmur Taylan & Durul Taylan	Engin Günaydın, Binnur Kaya & İlker Aksum	Comedy	
D E C	25	Dabbe 2	Hasan Karacadağ	Sefa Zengin, Deniz Olgaç & İncinur Daşdemir	Horror	
D E C	25	Orada				

== See also ==
- 2009 in Turkey
