= The Little Apocalypse =

The Little Apocalypse can refer to:

- The Little Apocalypse (1993 film), a French film
- The Little Apocalypse (2006 film), a Turkish film
- The Olivet Discourse, a passage in the synoptic Gospels where Jesus is depicted describing the end times
