= Stuck Apart =

2021 Turkish comedy-drama film turk

- Theatrical release poster
- Turkish: Azizler
- Directed by: Taylan Biraderler
- Screenplay by: Berkun Oya; Taylan Biraderler
- Produced by: Taylan Biraderler; Müge Kolat
- Starring: Engin Günaydın; Haluk Bilginer; Binnur Kaya; Öner Erkan; İrem Sak; Fatih Artman; Gülçin Santırcıoğlu; İlker Aksum; Hülya Duyar
- Cinematography: Burak Kanbir
- Edited by: Bora Gökşingöl
- Music by: Veyasin
- Production company: Imaj International
- Distributed by: Netflix
- Release date: 8 January 2021
- Country: Turkey
- Language: Turkish

Stuck Apart (Turkish: Azizler) is a 2021 Turkish comedy-drama film directed by Durul Taylan and Yağmur Taylan, written by Durul Taylan, Yagmur Taylan and Berkun Oya, Produced by Durul Taylan, Yağmur Taylan, Hülya Duyar, Berkun Oya, Müge Kolat and Barış Ayaztaş, and starring, Engin Günaydın, Haluk Bilginer and Binnur Kaya. The film was originally scheduled to be released theatrically by Imaj International on October 2, 2020. The theatrical release was later cancelled due to the COVID-19 pandemic and it was sold to Netflix. It was released on 8 January 2021 on Netflix.

== Cast ==
- Engin Günaydın - Aziz
- Haluk Bilginer - Erbil
- Binnur Kaya - Kamuran
- Öner Erkan - Alp
- İrem Sak - Burcu
- Fatih Artman - Cevdet
- Gülçin Santırcıoğlu - Vildan
- İlker Aksum - Rıza
- Hülya Duyar - Rüya
- Göktuğ Yıldırım - Caner
- Helin Kandemir - Cansu
- Bergüzar Korel - Füsun
- Halit Ergenç - Necati
- Okan Yalabık - psychologist
