= Yabancı Damat =

Turkish TV drama series

- Written by: Sulhi Dölek; Selin Tunç
- Directed by: Durul Taylan; Yağmur Taylan
- Starring: Nehir Erdoğan; Özgür Çevik; Engin Akyürek; Erdal Özyağcılar; Arif Erkin Güzelbeyoğlu; Yılmaz Gruda; Zeki Alasya; İlker Aksum; Binnur Kaya
- Theme music composer: Gökhan Kırdar
- Country of origin: Turkey
- Original languages: Turkish; Greek; English
- No. of episodes: 106

Production
- Producer: Türker İnanoğlu
- Running time: 60 min
- Production company: Erler Film

Original release
- Network: Kanal D
- Release: November 12, 2004 – June 15, 2007

Yabancı Damat (literally: The Foreign Groom) is a Turkish television drama distributed by Erler Film with 106 episodes in total. It deals with the relationship between a young Greek man Niko and a Turkish girl Nazlı, and the problems (and especially the prejudices) encountered in an intercultural marriage. Its comedic tone and play on historic Greco-Turkish antagonism made it a huge hit in both Turkey and Greece, as well as making stars out of the leading actors. The episodes are shot in Turkey and Greece. The music is Turkish and Greek.

The series ran from November 12, 2004, till June 15, 2007 on the Turkish channel Kanal D Friday evenings at 20:00 hrs.

== Plot ==
Nazlı is the daughter of a conservative Turkish father Kahraman, who is a famous baklava maker in Gaziantep. Her grandfather Memik Dede is a Greco-Turkish War veteran. Then there is Kadir (Engin Akyürek), son of Ökkeş, the business partner of Kahraman. Kadir is engaged to Nazli. He is kind-hearted and loves her very much. But Nazli falls in love with Niko. Niko, whose parents are immigrants from Istanbul, is the son of a wealthy Greek ship owner Stavro. Nazlı and Niko meet in Bodrum, fall in love at first sight and decide to marry. The comedy starts when Niko goes to Gaziantep to ask for her father's agreement to the marriage. Historical enmity between the two nations makes it very hard and both families oppose their marriage in the beginning. Finally, Nazlı and Niko form a family and settle in Istanbul. They meaningfully name their son Ege ("Aegean"), the sea between Turkey and Greece. The families visit each other several times for various reasons and get so closer. Niko's spinster aunt Katina gets married with a Turkish man, much exasperating her mother Efthalia. Even the initial hatred between the older members of the families, Memik Dede and Efthalia, turns to a romantic affair. As Nazli and Niko enjoy their time, Kadir and Niko's secretary Anna fall in love. Kadir and Anna get engaged, but circumstances make them to separate as Anna's modeling profession is not accepted by Kadir's family. Stella (another foreigner) is the next woman in Kadir's life. They are happily married and living peacefully, when again tragedy strikes. Stella unable of having kids leaves and asks for a peaceful divorce from Kadir as she wants him to live a complete life with family and children. Finally, Kadir is married to a Turkish girl Aysel. They have a daughter whom he names ‘Nazli’.

== Cast ==
The cast of the series is mostly made of experienced Turkish actors and actresses.

=== Nazlı's family ===
- Nehir Erdoğan - Nazlı
- Erdal Özyağcılar - Kahraman, Nazli's father, a famous baklava maker in Gaziantep
- Sumru Yavrucuk - Feride, Nazli's mother
- Binnur Kaya - Nazire, Nazli's older sister
- İlker Aksum - Ruşen, Nazire's husband
- Arif Erkin Güzelbeyoğlu - Memik Dede, Nazli's grandfather
- Ozan Uğurlu - Mustafacan, Nazli's younger brother
- Ege Uslu - Nazli and Niko's older son

=== Niko's family ===
- Özgür Çevik - Niko (Nikos)
- Mazlum Kiper - Stavro (Stavros), Niko's father
- Ayla Karaca - Eleni, Niko's mother
- Tülin Oral - Eftelya (Euthalia), Niko's grandmother
- Nilgün Belgün - Katina, Niko's aunt
- Ege Uslu - Nazlı and Niko's older son
- Meryem Adda - Nazli and Niko's baby-daughter

=== Kadir's family ===
- Engin Akyürek - Kadir, former lover of Nazlı
- Zeki Alasya - Ökkeş, Kadir's father and Kahraman's business partner
- Seray Gözler - Hayriye, Kadir's mother
- Asli Altaylar - Aysel, Kadir's last wife
- Nazli - Aysel's and Kadir's baby-daughter

=== Minor characters ===
- Yeliz Akkaya - Esra Akman, Niko's assistant
- Güzin Alkan - Döne, maid of Nazlı's family
- Natalia Doussopoulos - Anna, Kadir's girlfriend
- Katerina Moutsatsou - Stella, Kadir's ex-wife
- Binnaz Ergin - İkramiye, housekeeper of Nazlı's and Niko's house in Istanbul
- Yılmaz Gruda - Celayir Usta, Ökkeş's baklava master
- Ahmet Uz - Hikmet
- Şinasi Yurtsever - Hamit, Döne's husband
- Nazlı Tosunoğlu - Rabia, Ruşen's mother
- Kayra/İlayda/Talıa Songur - Nazire's and Ruşen's daughters
- Alara Bozbey - Natalia, Nursemaid

== Locations ==
The episodes are shot in Bodrum, Gaziantep, Istanbul in Turkey and on the Greek Islands of Symi, Santorini, Crete and in Athens.

== International broadcast ==
The Greek channel Mega TV broadcast it from July 4, 2005. The first season was shown on daily basis at 23:00 hrs, the second season was shown every Monday at 21:00. The third season was split, half of the episodes where shown Saturdays of 2007 at 21:00 and the other half episodes are shown in 2008, every Saturday at 17:00. The series used to have great success, especially when the first season was shown. The ratings of the third season are very low, so the channel decided to move the series in the evening schedule. The Bulgarian channel bTV broadcasts it since August 29, 2009 daily at 17:00 hrs. with the title Brak s chujdenets (Marriage with a Foreigner). The series was also dubbed into Arabic with the title Al-Gharib ("الغريب", The Stranger) and aired in March 2009 on MBC+ Drama.

== Awards ==
- 2006 "Best TV Series of the Year" award by the Turkish Association of Radio and Television Journalists along with two other TV series.
- 2004: "Best Supporting Actress" award by 1st Annual Primetime Beyaz Inci Awards
- 2004: "Best Actor" (nominated) by 1st Annual Primetime Beyaz Inci Awards
- 2004: "Best Actress" (nominated) by 1st Annual Primetime Beyaz Inci Awards
- 2004: "Best Music" by 1st Annual Primetime Beyaz Inci Awards
- 2004: "Best Actor in a Supporting Role" (nominated) by 1st Annual Primetime Beyaz Inci Awards
- 2004: "Best Director" by 1st Annual Primetime Beyaz Inci Awards

== Series overview ==
Season	Episodes	Originally released	
Season	Episodes	First released	Last released
1	29	November 12, 2004	June 17, 2005
2	40	September 16, 2005	June 30, 2006
3	37	September 15, 2006	June 15, 2007

== Release ==
Season	Running date & time	Season start	Season final	Running episode numbers	Episode interval	Season year	TV channel
Season 1	Friday 20.00	12 November 2004	17 June 2005	29	1–29	2004–2005	Kanal D
Season 2	Friday 20.00	16 September 2005	30 June 2006	40	30–69	2005–2006	Kanal D
Season 3	Friday 20.00	15 September 2006	15 June 2007 (Final)	37	70–106	2006–2007	Kanal D
