= The Master (2009 film) =

- Theatrical poster
- Directed by: Bahadır Karataş
- Written by: Ayfer Tunç; Bahadır Karataş
- Produced by: Mete Özok
- Starring: Yetkin Dikinciler; Fadik Sevin Atasoy; Şevket Çoruh
- Cinematography: Mirsad Herović
- Edited by: Evren Aksoy
- Music by: Ömer Özgür
- Production company: Filmpark
- Release date: May 8, 2009
- Running time: 118 minutes
- Country: Turkey
- Language: Turkish

The Master (Turkish: Usta) is a 2009 Turkish drama film, directed by Bahadır Karataş, starring Yetkin Dikinciler as a small town car mechanic in who builds a small biplane in his backyard. The film, which went on nationwide general release across Turkey on May 8, 2009, won a Best Supporting Actress nomination for Hasibe Eren at the 3rd Yeşilçam Awards.

== Plot ==
Dogan, a car mechanic in a small town, is obsessed with flying. He has been building a small biplane in his back yard for years. His wife Emine does not share his affinity for aviation and feels neglected in their marriage. When Dogan's plane crashes during an aeronautics fair, she gives him an ultimatum: he can either pursue his passion for flying or live a humble life with her, solely as a car mechanic.

== Production ==
The film was shot on location in Eskişehir, Turkey.

== See also ==
- 2009 in film
- Turkish films of 2009
