= Tevfik Akbaşlı =

Turkish composer

Tevfik Akbasli (born 1962) is a Turkish composer.

== Studies ==
One of the most prominent classical Turkish Composers, Akbasli is the son of businessman Samim Akbasli of İzmir. He spent his childhood and primary school years in Yeşilköy, Istanbul until his family moved to Izmir. He attended Dokuz Eylül University's Vocal Studies and Opera Division and studied with distinguished names such as Sevda Aydan, Suat Taser, Kamran Ince and percussionist Oktay Aykoc. He graduated from Vocal Studies in 1982 as the first chorister to the newly founded İzmir State Opera and Ballet. In 1985, he crossed over as a percussion artist. Between 1986 and 1991, he studied percussion instruments as well as theory, harmony, composition and improvisation at the Berklee School of Music at vibraphone virtuoso Gary Burton's Percussion Department with Professor Ed Saindon and pianist – composer Aydin Esen.

== Career ==
He turned to composition in 1990. He has composed an array of pieces from opera to musicals for children, from modern dance music to chamber music. Upon the addition of his first opera, The Sacred Chest to the repertoire of The Ankara State Opera and Ballet, he moved to Ankara and continued his career as an orchestra artist. The chamber music piece he was commissioned to compose, Autumn in Ankara was performed in Germany in 1994. He was awarded the Aziz Nesin Grand Prize by the Cagdas Yasami Destekleme Dernegi for the music he composed for the Giordano Bruno play in 1996, when he was also awarded the Special Jury Award by the Eczacıbasi Contest Jury for his symphonic poem, Turkiye. In 1998, he was again awarded the third place for his symphonic poem Dixi et Salvavi Animam Meam at the Eczacibasi's composition contest, whereas in 2000, he was the first prize winner of the same contest for his orchestra suite called Rebirth which also came out as a CD and performed in the opening ceremony of the International Music Festival of Ephesus. Between 2000 and 2001, he attended workshops and master classes in contemporary American and film music in New York where his modern dance music Jamaican Pond Sunsets was performed. He joined the Istanbul State Opera and Ballet in 2002. His Ballet of 2003, The Conquest was awarded the Special Jury Award at a National Composition Contest by the Ministry of Culture.

In his work, Tevfik Akbasli focused on melodic composition and accessible musical expression. His approach was influenced by his experience as both a composer and performer over several decades. His compositions drew inspiration from classical music traditions and emphasized structured melodic elements.

MSG is the copyright holder to his work.

His major works and awards are:

== Orchestra ==
- 1995 – Why? (concerto for percussion and orchestra) performed by Presidential Symphony Orchestra and İzmir State Symphony Orchestra
- 1996 – Turkiye (symphonic poem) - Eczacıbasi National Composition Contest – Special Jury Award
- 1997 – A Tribute to Freddie Mercury - A Symphonic Rock Project with Opera Chorus – Ankara
- 1998 – Dixi et Salvavi Animam Meam (symphonic poem) Eczacıbasi National Composition Contest – Third Place Award
- 2000 – Rebirth (suit for orchestra) Eczacıbasi National Composition Contest – First Prize Winner

performed by Bilkent Symphony Orchestra and Istanbul State Opera and Ballet

- 2004 – Stay! (music for orchestra)
- 2008 – Wake up, Resist and Give in to the Light

== Opera, ballet, modern dance and the other stage works ==
- 1993 – The Sacred Chest (opera in 2 Acts) 1993 / 1994 Ankara State Opera and Ballet
- 1993 – Dear Peace (musical for children in 2 acts) 1993–1997 Izmir State Opera and Ballet / 1998–2000 Ankara State Opera and Ballet
- 1995 – Dinosours Were Young Also (musical in 2 acts)
- 1996 – Giordano Bruno (music for a play) – Aziz Nesin Prize – 1996 – Ankara State Theater
- 1997 – Mutation (music for modern dance) 1997–1998 – Modern Dance Company – Ankara
- 1998 – A Little Family Matter (play in 2 acts)
- 1999 – Amber (Opera in 2 Acts)
- 2001 – Jamaica Pond Sunsets (music for modern dance) 2001 - New York
- 2003 – Fetih – The Conquest (music for ballet) Ministry of Culture National Composition Contest – Special Jury Award
- 2010 – Kosem Sultan (ballet) 2011 – İzmir State Opera and Ballet
- 2012 – Suleiman the Magnificent (opera) 2013 – İzmir State Opera and Ballet

== Chamber music ==
- 1994 – Autumn in Ankara (Music for Oboe, Violin, Viola and Cello) 1994 – Zigburg - Germany
- 2004 – Between Us (Music for Flute, Viola ve Cello) 2004 - Istanbul

== Discography ==
- 2001 – Nejat F. Eczacıbasi National Composition Contest (1996–1998 – 2000) First Prize Winners’ CD

Bilkent Symphony Orchestra Conducted by Erol Erdinc

- 2007 – Beyaz Melek – The White Angel – The Original Motion Picture Soundtrack

The City of Prague Philharmonic Orchestra and Opera Chorus Conducted by Adam Klemens

- 2009 – Gunesi Gordum – I Saw the Sun – The Original Motion Picture Soundtrack

Prague Filmharmonic Orchestra and Opera Chorus Conducted by Adam Klemens

- 2010 – Gecenin Kanatlari – Wings of the Night – The Original Motion Picture Soundtrack

Prague Filmharmonic Orchestra and Opera Chorus Conducted by Adam Klemens

- 2011 – New York' ta Bes Minare – Five Minarets in New York – The Original Motion Picture Soundtrack

Prague Filmharmonic Orchestra and Opera Chorus Conducted by Adam Klemens

- 2011 – Hur Adam – Free Man – The Original Motion Picture Soundtrack

Prague Filmharmonic Orchestra and Opera Chorus Conducted by Adam Klemens

- 2012 – Sessiz Sinema – Silent Movie] – Funda Arar (Orchestrator)

The City of Prague Philharmonic Orchestra Conducted by Adam Klemens

- 2015 – Mucize – The Miracle - The Original Motion Picture Soundtrack

Prague Filmharmonic Orchestra and Opera Chorus Conducted by Adam Klemens

- 2015 – Sevimli Tehlikeli – Cute and Dangerous – The Original Motion Picture Soundtrack

Prague Filmharmonic Orchestra and Opera Chorus Conducted by Adam Klemens

- 2015 – Senden Bana Kalan – What's Left of You - The Original Motion Picture Soundtrack

Prague Filmharmonic Orchestra and Opera Chorus Conducted by Adam Klemens

- 2016 – Kendime Iyi Bakmadim – Didn't Take Care of Myself – Toygar Isikli (Orchestrator)

The City of Prague Philharmonic Orchestra Conducted by Richard Hain
