= Inside (2012 film) =

- Film poster
- Turkish: Yeraltı
- Directed by: Zeki Demirkubuz
- Starring: Engin Günaydın; Serhat Tutumluer
- Release date: 13 April 2012
- Running time: 107 minutes
- Country: Turkey
- Language: Turkish

Inside (Turkish: Yeraltı) is a 2012 Turkish drama film directed by Zeki Demirkubuz. It is inspired by Fyodor Dostoevsky's 1864 novella Notes from Underground.

== Cast ==
- Engin Günaydın as Muharem
- Serhat Tutumluer as Cevat
- Nihal Yalçın as Türkan
- Sarp Apak as Barmen
- Murat Cemcir as Sinan
- Serkan Keskin as Tarik
- Feridun Koç - Ferdiun
