= Fatih Artman =

Turkish actor

- Born: 13 February 1988 (age 38); Ankara, Turkey
- Occupation: Actor
- Years active: 2010–present

Fatih Artman (born 13 February 1988) is a Turkish actor. He graduated the theatre faculty of Hacettepe University.

== Career ==
=== Television ===
Artman is best known for his performance as Harun in the popular series Behzat Ç. Bir Ankara Polisiyesi. Along with Behzat Ç. co-star Canan Ergüder, he had a leading role in Menajerimi Ara which was adapted from the French original series.

He played in Beş Kardeş, written and directed by Onur Ünlü. Recent projects include joining the cast of the historical series Vatanım Sensin.

=== Web series ===
He appeared in the historical miniseries Son Destan, which is set in Yugoslavia. Artman has received critical acclaim for his performances in Bir Başkadır and Kuvvetli Bir Alkış, both of which were written and directed by Berkun Oya.

=== Films ===
Fatih Artman is known for his role as Harun in the crime film series Behzat Ç, which is based on the novel of the same name. He also starred in the surreal comedy Bana Masal Anlatma. Artman has received critical acclaim for his performances, winning the Sadri Alışık Award and the Adana Film Festival Award for Best Actor for his roles in Aşkın Gören Gözlere İhtiyacı Yok, Kırık Kalpler Bankası, and Cingöz Recai written and directed by Onur Ünlü. He also played in Gülse Birsel's comedy movies Aile Arasında and Yılbaşı Gecesi. Artman also received praise for his roles in Yılmaz Erdoğan's movies Ekşi Elmalar and Tatlım Tatlım.

== Filmography ==
=== Web series ===
Year	Series	Role
2017	Son Destan	
2019	Jet Sosyete	Yaman (episode 42)
2020	Ethos	Yasin
2021	Love 101	Osman (adult)
2024	A Round of Applause	Mehmet
2025–	Kimler Geldi, Kimler Geçti	Ali Yöreoğlu

=== TV series ===
Year	Series	Role
2010–2013	Behzat Ç. Bir Ankara Polisiyesi	Harun
2011	Leyla ile Mecnun	Harun
2015	Beş Kardeş	Aziz
2017	Vatanım Sensin	Yüzbaşı Yakup /Binbir Surat/Suratsız
2020–2021	Menajerimi Ara	Çınar Bilgin

=== Movies ===
Year	Title	Role
2011	Behzat Ç. Seni Kalbime Gömdüm	Harun
2013	Behzat Ç. Ankara Yanıyor	Harun
2015	Bana Masal Anlatma	Rıza
2016	Ekşi Elmalar	Habip
2015	Kırık Kalpler Bankası	The Angel
2017	Tatlım Tatlım	
2017	Aşkın Gören Gözlere İhtiyacı Yok	
2017	Cingöz Recai: Bir Efsanenin Dönüşü	Eren
2017	Aile Arasında	Emirhan Kurt
2021	Azizler	Cevdet
2022	Cici	
2022	Yılbaşı Gecesi	Ozan
2024	Evcilik	Fırat

== Theatre ==
- Colombinus Düşler Yolu
- Müfettiş Yastık Adam
- Dünyada Karşılaşmış Gibi
- Death of a Salesman by Arthur Miller, directed by Rufus Norris, Zorlu PSM, 2026
