= Demet Evgar =

Turkish actress and singer (born 1980)

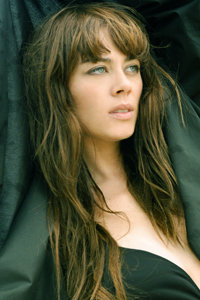
- Born: 18 May 1980 (age 45); Manisa, Turkey
- Education: Istanbul University State Conservatory - theatre department
- Occupation: Actress
- Years active: 2000–present
- Spouse: Levent Babataş (m. 2022)
- Children: 1

Demet Evgar (born 18 May 1980) is a Turkish actress and singer known for her roles in feature films and TV series. She also pursues an active career as an actress in theatre where she made her debut. She has founded theatre institutions such as "Pangar", "Hata Yapım Atölyesi", "Müşterek", "Multi Arts Production".

Evgar was born in Manisa in 1980. Her paternal family is of Albanian origin. While the Ottoman Empire was collapsing, the other part of her family, which is of Turkish descent, immigrated from Thessaloniki, which today is part of Greece. Her brother is director Yiğit Evgar.

Her film career includes awards and box office successes. In her television career, she starred in the rom-com 1 Kadın 1 Erkek for 8 seasons. She also played supporting roles in the hit comedy series Emret Komutanım, Yedi Numara, and Tatlı Hayat. She played the role of "Kara Fatma" (guest star) in the period series Vatanım Sensin and had a leading role in drama series Avlu and Alev Alev.

In 2020, she released her first official single "Nanay" and in 2021 she was featured on Can Bonomo's song "Rüyamda Buluttum".

== Filmography ==
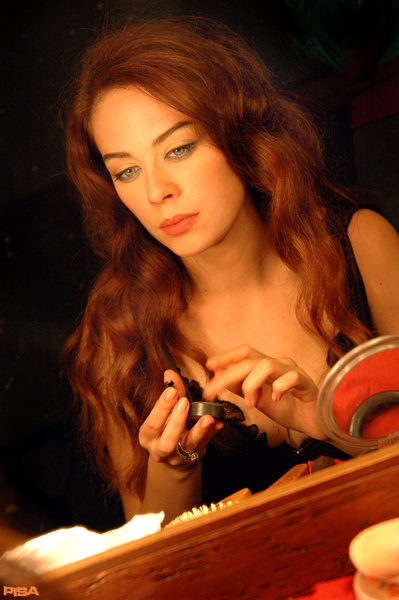
Demet Evgar

Cinema
Year	Title	Role	Notes
2005	Banyo	Hülya	
2006	Beyza'nın Kadınları	Beyza Türker, Rabia Çınar, Dilara, Ayla	Nominated – Best Actress / 39th Turkish Film Critics Association Awards
2009	Güneşi Gördüm	Havar	Nominated – Best Actress / 3rd Yeşilçam Awards
2010	Yahşi Batı	Suzan Van Dyke	Nominated – Best Actress / 4th Yeşilçam Awards
2010	Vay Arkadaş	Nil	
2013	Sen Aydınlatırsın Geceyi	Yasemin	Nominated - Best Actress / 46th Turkish Film Critics Association Awards; Won - Best Supporting Actress in a Motion Picture - Drama / 19th Sadri Alışık Theatre and Cinema Awards
2015	Yok Artık!	Ceyda	
2016	Kötü Kedi Şerafettin	Misket ve Tacettin (voice)	
2017	Aşkın Gören Gözlere İhtiyacı Yok	Handan	Nominated - Best Actress in a Motion Picture - Comedy / 24th Sadri Alışık Theatre and Cinema Awards
2017	Sofra Sırları	Neslihan	Won - Best Actress / 37th Istanbul International Film Festival; Nominated - Best Actress / 51st Turkish Film Critics Association Awards
2017	Aile Arasında	Solmaz	Nominated - Best Actress / 50th Turkish Film Critics Association Awards; Won - Best Actress in a Motion Picture - Comedy / 23rd Sadri Alışık Theatre and Cinema Awards
2019	Topal Şükran'ın Maceraları	Şükran	
Television
Year	Title	Role	Notes
2000	Bir Demet Tiyatro		
2000	Yedi Numara	Yeliz	
2000	Çiçek Taksi	Safiye	
2002	Aslı ile Kerem	Yeliz	
2002	Tatlı Hayat	Defne - İhsan Yıldırım's secretary	
2003	Yuvam Yıkılmasın	Hülya	
2003	Çınaraltı	Nilüfer	
2004	Bütün Çocuklarım	Eyşan	
2005	Emret Komutanım	Üsteğmen Çiğdem	
2006	Erkekler Ağlamaz	Zeynep	
2007	Gençlik Başımda Duman		
2008–2015	1 Erkek 1 Kadın 2 Çocuk	Zeynep Yıldırım	Won - Best Actress in a Comedy Series / 1st Antalya Television Awards (2010); Won - Best Actress in a Comedy Series / 37th Golden Butterfly Awards (2010); Won - Best Actress in a Comedy Series / 3rd Antalya Television Awards (2012); Nominated - Best Actress in a Comedy Series / 4th Antalya Television Awards (2013)
2017	Vatanım Sensin	Kara Fatma	Guest star
2018–2019	Avlu	Deniz Demir	
2020–2021	Alev Alev	Cemre	
2024	Bahar	Bahar Yavuzoğlu	

== Theatre ==
Theatre
Year	Title / Venue	Writer	Notes
2000	Takanlar ve Takılanlar / Tiyatro Kılçık		
	Kadınlar da Savaşı Yitirdi (Women Lost the War Too)	Curzio Malaparte	
2003	The Blue Room (staged under the title, Aşk Çemberi – The Circle of Love) / Kent Oyuncuları	David Hare	
2005	The Night Season / Kent Oyuncuları	Rebecca Lenkiewicz	Won - Best Actress in a Supporting Role - Drama / 10th Afife Theatre Awards
2006	Anna Karenina / Kent Oyuncuları	Leo Tolstoy	Won - Best Actress in a Supporting Role - Drama / 12th Sadri Alışık Theatre and Cinema Awards
2006	Ayşegül Hindistan'da / Tiyatro Kılçık		
2007	39 Steps / Kent Oyuncuları	John Buchan	Nominated - Best Actress in a Leading Role - Musical or Comedy / 13th Sadri Alışık Theatre and Cinema Awards
2009	The Miser / Kent Oyuncuları	Molière	Nominated - Best Actress in a Leading Role - Musical or Comedy / 15th Sadri Alışık Theatre and Cinema Awards
2012	Macbeth / Pangar	William Shakespeare	
2014	King Lear / Altıdan Sonra Theatre & Pangar	William Shakespeare	
2016	39 Steps / Müşterek	John Buchan	Nominated - Best Actress in a Leading Role - Comedy, Dark Comedy or Musical / 22nd Sadri Alışık Theatre and Cinema Awards
2016	Kozalar / Pangar	Adalet Ağaoğlu	
2019	Hedda Gabler / Pangar	Henrik Ibsen	

== Discography ==
=== Singles ===
- "Farketmeden" (2013)
- "Mak Mek Mok" (2014)
- "Bu Şarkıyı Dinliyorsan" (with Multitap) (2019)
- "Nanay" (2020)
- "Rüyamda Buluttum" (with Can Bonomo) (2021)
