= Behzat Ç. Bir Ankara Polisiyesi =

2010 Turkish crime drama series

- Genre: Crime drama; Police procedural
- Created by: Emrah Serbes
- Based on: Her Temas İz Bırakır and Son Hafriyat by Emrah Serbes
- Written by: Emrah Serbes; Ercan Mehmet Erdem
- Directed by: Serdar Akar; Doğan Ümit Karaca
- Starring: Erdal Beşikçioğlu; Nejat İşler; Canan Ergüder; İnanç Konukçu; Fatih Artman; Berkan Şal; Ayça Eren; Seda Bakan; Hakan Hatipoğlu; Berke Üzrek; Ege Aydan
- Country of origin: Turkey
- Original language: Turkish
- No. of seasons: 4
- No. of episodes: 105

Production
- Producer: Serdar Akar
- Production locations: Ankara; İstanbul (episode 32 & 37)
- Running time: 65 min.

Original release
- Network: Star TV
- Release: September 19, 2010 – May 17, 2013
- Network: BluTV
- Release: July 25 – September 19, 2019

Behzat Ç. Bir Ankara Polisiyesi (Behzat Ç. An Ankara Detective Story) is a Turkish police procedural crime drama television series based on the novels "Her Temas İz Bırakır" and "Son Hafriyat" by Emrah Serbes. The series takes place in Ankara. It first aired on 19 September 2010, on Star TV. After the 3rd season ended in 2013, the 4th season has started in summer 2019 by 9-episode webisodes in BluTV. Also, Ercüment Çözer character's spin off series is "Saygı".

== Plot ==
Behzat Ç. is a rough, violent, and morally ambiguous police officer who is the head of the homicide department in Ankara. His team consists of five people: Harun, Hayalet (Ghost), Akbaba (Vulture), Cevdet, Selim and Eda. Behzat Ç and his team usually work together with the public prosecutor Esra, who later becomes his love interest. They chase criminals with perseverance and solve murders while sometimes (and usually unwillingly) getting involved in different cases.

=== Character background ===
Behzat Ç. graduated from the police academy in 1985. He does not care much about his superiors — not even the law in some cases. He only follows his inner conscience and instincts. This often brings him trouble. Even though he graduated from the police academy many years ago, suspensions and reprimands have kept him in the same position for years while his colleagues have reached the top of their careers.

After an unsuccessful marriage, he no longer trusts women. The only woman he seems to care about is his daughter Berna. During the first season, Berna is found dead, which looks like a case of suicide at first glance, but turns out to be a murder. Behzat Ç. and his team attempt to solve the secrets behind her murder. During the ordeal, he becomes close to his ex-wife, but she turns down the relationship. He gets in a relationship with a club singer named Gönül and then becomes interested in Esra. The main suspect in Berna's death is flamboyant mob boss and businessman, Ercüment Çözer, who is tracked down successfully by Behzat Ç., but flees abroad using his deep political connections.

At the end of the first season, Berna's killer is revealed to be Şule, a girl who has been living with Behzat Ç. for months and whom Behzat Ç. treats as a second daughter. Later in the episode, Şule also confesses to Behzat Ç. that she is his biological daughter. The final episode of the first season was considered by many critics as the best season finale of a Turkish TV series.

The second season begins a few months after the events of the first season. During the first episode of the second season, Behzat Ç. does not speak (which was a running theme for most of the second novel, Son Hafriyat). This season also involves a new main plot as well as numerous new and old subplots that introduce and explore new characters. The main plot of the second season is the search for the Parmak Kesen Katil (Finger-Cutter Killer), who started killing again after a hiatus of 15 years.

== Behzat Ç. Seni Kalbime Gömdüm ==
Behzat Ç. Seni Kalbime Gömdüm (I Buried You in My Heart) is the theatrical movie of the TV series based on the second novel Son Hafriyat by Emrah Serbes, who also wrote the script for the film. Directed by Serdar Akar, it tells the story of a cop killer known as Red Kit (the Turkish name translation of the cartoon character Lucky Luke).

== Behzat Ç. Ankara Yanıyor ==
Second film released in 2013.

== Saygı: Bir Ercüment Çözer Dizisi ==
Between 2020 and 2021, Ercüment Çözer character's spin off series Saygı: Bir Ercüment Çözer Dizisi released two seasons in BluTv alongside Nejat İşler, Miray Daner, Damla Sönmez, Boran Kuzum, Rojda Demirer.

== Çekiç ve Gül: Bir Behzat Ç. Hikayesi ==
Çekiç ve Gül: Bir Behzat Ç. Hikayesi series is based from Emrah Serbes's novel "Çekiç ve Gül". It first aired on 6 December 2022 on BluTv. Savcı Esra character came back.

== Main characters ==
Job	Character	Actor
Superintendent and Chief Inspector	Behzat Ç.	Erdal Beşikçioğlu
Inspector	Harun	Fatih Artman
Inspector	Hayalet	İnanç Konukçu
Inspector	Akbaba	Berkan Şal
Behzat's brother	Şevket	Ege Aydan
Behzat's daughter	Şule	Ayça Eren
Prostitute	Eylül	Sezin Akbaşoğulları
Sub-Inspector	Eda	Seda Bakan
Sub-Inspector	Cevdet	Berke Üzrek
Inspector	Emre	Engin Öztürk
Harun's sister	Aslı	Zeynep Koltuk
Deputy Chief of Police	Tahsin	Eray Eserol
Businessman and crime leader	Ercüment Çözer	Nejat İşler
Medical Examiner	Barbaros	Serdar Orçin
Barbaros' assistant	Muzaffer	Gökhan Yıkılkan

== Awards ==
- Silver, Key, Art Awards (2012) Teaser
