= Jolly Life =

2009 Turkish comedy film

- Jolly Life Theatrical Poster
- Directed by: Yılmaz Erdoğan
- Written by: Yılmaz Erdoğan
- Produced by: Necati Akpınar
- Starring: Yılmaz Erdoğan; Ersin Korkut; Burcu Gönder; Cezmi Baskın; Erdal Tosun; Rıza Akın
- Cinematography: Uğur İçbak
- Edited by: Engin Öztürk; Yılmaz Erdoğan
- Music by: Deniz Erdoğan; Yıldıray Gürgen
- Production company: BKM Film
- Distributed by: Cine Film
- Release date: November 27, 2009
- Running time: 100 minutes
- Country: Turkey
- Language: Turkish

Jolly Life (Turkish: Neşeli Hayat) is a 2009 Turkish comedy film, written and directed by Yılmaz Erdoğan, about a working class Turkish man who accepts a job as a Mall Santa. It was one of the highest-grossing Turkish films of 2009. The film, which went on nationwide general release across Turkey on November 27, 2009, was screened in competition at the 29th International Istanbul Film Festival and was nominated in several categories at the 3rd Yeşilçam Awards. The cast are actors of Çok Güzel Hareketler Bunlar. Due to filming was done simultaneously for two productions, The actors have minor roles. Writer, director and star Erdoğan says that the main character is between the worlds of the Westernized upper class Turks and the working class Turks in the east of the country.

== See also ==
- 2009 in film
- Turkish films of 2009
