= Berker Güven =

Turkish actor

- Born: 7 September 1994 (age 31); İzmir, Turkey
- Occupation: Actor
- Years active: 2017–present

Berker Güven (born 7 September 1994) is a Turkish actor.

He made his cinematic debut in 2017 with a role in the movie Babam alongside Çetin Tekindor and Melisa Şenolsun. He started his career in television with his role as Aleksi in Vatanım Sensin, and further rose to prominence by his performance in Zalim İstanbul as Nedim.

At the 22nd Sadri Alışık Theater and Cinema Actors Awards, he received the Outstanding Young Actor Award for his performance in the theater play Yen.

In November 2019, he was given the Best Drama Actor of the Year award at the Turkey– Azerbaijan Brotherhood Awards.

== Filmography ==
Film
Year	Title	Role	Notes
2017	Babam	Arif Tunalı	Leading role
Television
2017–2018	Vatanım Sensin	Aleksi	Supporting role
2019–2020	Zalim İstanbul	Nedim Karaçay	Leading role
2020	Hoş Bi' Sohbet	Himself	Presenter
2020–2021	Alev Alev	İskender Kayabeyli	Leading role
2022–	Üç Kız Kardeş	Somer Korman	Leading role
