= The Little Apocalypse (2006 film) =

- Theatrical poster
- Directed by: Yağmur Taylan; Durul Taylan
- Written by: Doğu Yücel
- Produced by: Hayri Aslan
- Starring: Başak Köklükaya; Cansel Elçin; İlker Aksum; Binnur Kaya
- Cinematography: Soykut Turan
- Distributed by: Limon Film
- Release date: 22 December 2006
- Running time: 85 min.
- Country: Turkey
- Language: Turkish

The Little Apocalypse (Original Turkish title: Küçük Kıyamet) is a 2006 Turkish psychological horror film directed by the Taylan brothers. (Yağmur and Durul Taylan)

== Plot ==
Bilge had lost her mother in the 1999 earthquake. Several years later, she and her family go on a vacation to the coast. On the way to their rented house, she sees a series of visions. Things get worse when a small earthquake occurs, bringing back memories of her loss and releasing her inner demons.

== Cast ==
- Başak Köklükaya as Bilge
- Cansel Elçin as Zeki
- İlker Aksum as Ali
- Binnur Kaya as Filiz
- Bora Akkaş as Batu
- Serra Gürgünlü as Eda
- Ece Ekşi as Didem
- Özgür Çevik (cameo)
- Şinasi Yurtsever
- Berrin Arısoy

== Awards ==
The film received the following awards:

- 18th Ankara Film Festival: Best screenplay (Çiçek Kahraman)
- 12th Sadri Alışık Awards: Best actress (Başak Köklükaya)
- 38th Siyad Türk Sineması Ödülleri: Best supporting actor (İlker Aksum)
