= The Governor (2009 film) =

- Theatrical Poster
- Directed by: M. Çağatay Tosun
- Written by: M. Çağatay Tosun; Batur Emin Akyel
- Produced by: Ata Türkoğlu
- Starring: Erdal Beşikçioğlu; Şebnem Dönmez; Uğur Polat; İsmail Hacıoğlu; Özgür Çevik; Şemsi İnkaya; Hakan Gerçek; Hakan Boyav
- Cinematography: Ferhan Akgün
- Edited by: Ufuk Özenateş
- Music by: Nail Yurtsever; Cem Tuncer; Engin Arslan
- Production company: KOLİBA Film
- Distributed by: Medyavizyon; Maxximum
- Release date: January 9, 2009
- Running time: 110 minutes
- Country: Turkey
- Language: Turkish
- Box office: US$2,371,977

The Governor (Turkish: Vali) is a 2009 Turkish action film, directed by M. Çağatay Tosun, about the idealist governor of the Aegean city of Denizli, where a team of engineers from the Turkish Mining Exploration Institute (MTA) have recently discovered reserves of uranium. The film, which went on nationwide general release across Turkey on January 9, 2009, was one of the highest-grossing Turkish films of 2009.

== Production ==
The film was shot on location in Istanbul, Ankara and Uşak, Turkey.

== Synopsis ==
Faruk Yazıcı (Erdal Beşikçioğlu) is the idealist governor of the Aegean city of Denizli, where a team of engineers from the Turkish Mining Exploration Institute (MTA) have recently discovered reserves of uranium.

The governor joins forces with his childhood friend Ömer Uçar (Uğur Polat), who heads the team of MTA engineers, in a fight against the beautiful and scheming bureaucrat Ceyda Aydın (Şebnem Dönmez), who actually works to get mines in Turkey under the control of foreign companies. A number of unexplained murders are uncovered only a short while after the governor and the MTA engineers focus on the reserves in Denizli.

== Release ==
The film opened in 175 screens across Turkey on January 9, 2009 at number one in the Turkish box office chart with an opening weekend gross of US$526,262. It was later released across Germany, Austria and the UK.

Opening weekend gross
Date	Territory	Screens	Rank	Gross
January 9, 2009	Turkey	175	1	US$526,262
March 5, 2009	Germany	22	43	US$12,503
March 6, 2009	Austria	2	40	US$893
March 13, 2009	UK	2	58	US$1,279

== Box office ==
The film opened at number one at the Turkish box office and was the ninth highest grossing Turkish film of 2009 with a worldwide total gross of US$2,339,823. That figure has subsequently risen to US$2,371,977.

== See also ==
- 2009 in film
- Turkish films of 2009
