= Toss-Up =

2004 Turkish drama film

- Theatrical Poster
- Directed by: Uğur Yücel
- Written by: Uğur Yücel
- Produced by: Uğur Yücel; Haris Padouvas; Hakkı Göçeoğlu; Defne Kayalar
- Starring: Kenan İmirzalıoğlu; Engin Günaydın; Erkan Can; Olgun Şimşek; Ahmet Mümtaz Taylan; Settar Tanrıöğen
- Cinematography: Barış Özbiçer
- Edited by: Uğur Yücel; Valdís Óskarsdóttir
- Music by: Erkan Oğur
- Production companies: Cinegram; Mahayana Film
- Release date: September 24, 2004
- Running time: 102 mins
- Countries: Turkey, Greece
- Language: Turkish

Toss-Up (Turkish: Yazı Tura) is a 2004 Turkish drama film, produced, written and directed by Uğur Yücel, starring Kenan İmirzalıoğlu and Olgun Şimşek as two soldiers return home from their military service in southeastern Turkey with disabilities. The film, which went on nationwide general release across Turkey on September 24, 2004, won a record 11 awards at the 41st Antalya "Golden Orange" International Film Festival including the Golden Orange for Best Film.

== Plot ==
Two soldiers return home from their military service in southeastern Turkey with disabilities. Cevher (nicknamed "the Ghost") has lost his hearing while Rıdvan (nicknamed "the Devil") has lost a leg. Both are emotionally and physically scarred and find difficulties in adjusting to normal civilian life.

== Cast ==
- Kenan İmirzalıoğlu (Cevher)
- Olgun Şimşek (Rıdvan)
- Bahri Beyat (Cemil Sandalcılar / Father Cemil)
- Engin Günaydın (Sencer)
- Seda Akman (Nazan)
- Teoman Kumbaracıbaşı (Teoman)
- Erkan Can (Firuz)
- Eli Mango (Tasula)
- Mizgin Kapazan (Şefika)
- Levent Can (Hamit)
- Şinasi Yurtsever (Basri)
- Ahmet Mümtaz Taylan (Maksut Sandalcılar / Uncle Maki)
- Ülkü Duru (Melahat)
- Haldun Boysan (Muhittin)

== Awards ==
The film won a record 11 awards at the 41st Antalya Golden Orange Film Festival including Best Film, Best Director, Best Actor (for Olgun Şimşek), Best Supporting Actor (for Bahri Beyat), Best Supporting Actress (for Eli Mango), Best Screenplay (for Uğur Yücel) and Best Music (for Erkan Oğur).

== Reception ==
Toss-Up has received had positive reviews. Derek Elley from Variety stated in April 2005 that it "draws some fine playing from its cast" and "solid material for festival sidebars and film weeks".
