= Bad Cat =

2016 Turkish animated film

- Turkish theatrical release poster
- Kötü Kedi Şerafettin
- Directed by: Mehmet Kurtuluş; Ayşe Ünal
- Written by: Levent Kazak; Bülent Üstün
- Based on: Kötü Kedi Şerafettin by Bülent Üstün
- Produced by: Mehmet Kurtuluş; Vehbi Berksoy
- Starring: Uğur Yücel; Demet Evgar; Okan Yalabık
- Cinematography: Barış Ulus
- Edited by: Aylin Zoi Tinel; Çiğdem Yersel
- Music by: Oğuz Kaplangı; Tuluğ Tırpan; Serkan Çeliköz
- Production companies: Anima İstanbul; Kare Kare Film Yapim
- Distributed by: United International Pictures (Turkey); Odin's Eye Entertainment (International)
- Release date: 5 February 2016 (Turkey)
- Running time: 82 minutes
- Country: Turkey
- Language: Turkish

Bad Cat (Turkish: Kötü Kedi Şerafettin) is a 2016 Turkish adult animated action comedy film directed by Mehmet Kurtuluş and Ayşe Ünal. The film is based on the comic strip Kötü Kedi Şerafettin by Bülent Üstün. It is a self-funded independent film, and some its profits originated from product placement.

Bad Cat premiered on February 5, 2016, in Turkey and at the Annecy International Animation Film Festival in 2016. The film was released on Tubi on April 20, 2023. A video game adaptation, titled The Bad Cat, was released on mobile devices shortly after the film's release.

== Plot ==
Shero is a crass and short-tempered tabby cat, owned by a man named Tank. He sends his associates, Rifki the seagull and Riza the rat to obtain liquor for a barbecue that night. Another cat, Blackie, informs Shero about an attractive Siamese cat named Princess in a nearby apartment. When Princess's cartoonist owner leaves for work, Shero and Blackie sneak into the apartment to seduce her. Princess panics, triggering a series of accidents that lead to her death. The cartoonist returns home, finds Princess dead, and furiously attacks Shero and Blackie. Blackie is killed while Shero fights the cartoonist, and they both tumble out the window, resulting in the cartoonist's death. On his way back home, Shero meets a kitten named Taco, who claims to be Shero's illegitimate son. Shero rejects Taco and goes to steal fish from Hazel, Tank's landlady. She threatens Tank with eviction unless he can cover months of unpaid rent by the next day. Enraged, Tank ejects Shero from his home and blocks every possible entrance. While smoking and sulking, Shero witnesses a beautiful Angora cat named Misscat being harassed by a pair of dogs and rescues her by beating her assailants. Shero attempts to seduce Misscat but is turned down and told to meet her again on the same rooftop that night. Meanwhile, the brainless cadaver of the cartoonist is revived by an ambulance defibrillator. The cartoonist hijacks the ambulance and begins hunting for Shero.

Shero gets a bouquet for Misscat. Meanwhile, the cartoonist finds the two dogs and forces them to lead him to Shero. Taco witnesses this transaction and follows them. Shero and Misscat meet to prepare to make love, but they are captured and tied up by the dogs and the cartoonist. Before the cartoonist can electrocute Shero, Taco appears and frees Shero, who fights the cartoonist and throws him off the building and into a dumpster, along with the dogs. Shero brushes Taco off again, and Taco reveals that his mother, Mimosa, who was Shero's past mate, is dead. Shero and Taco bond after a brief exchange of fists. Taco helps Shero attempt to obtain liquor from the local grocer. However, the cartoonist, after hijacking a garbage truck, kidnaps Taco during the mission, forcing Shero to chase him. Shero rescues Taco as the garbage truck plunges into the sea, and he once more kills the cartoonist in an underwater fight. As Shero and Taco return home, Hazel chases off Misscat and installs barbed wire to further prevent Shero's entry. The cartoonist's body is lifted from the sea by a rescue team and revived once more with power wires.

After Rifki and Riza's latest attempt to retrieve liquor fails, Riza proposes to Shero that they can all get what they want by robbing a bank. The cartoonist is apprehended by the police, but he hijacks a police car when the bank robbery is reported. As Shero and the group make their getaway, Taco takes a bullet for Shero from the cartoonist. Shero, believing Taco to be dead, discards the stolen money into a crowd of people in his grief, and he leaves with Taco's body in the confusion. Tank comes across Shero and Taco and takes them back home in the absence of available veterinarians. Tank and Shero successfully treat Taco's bullet wound and revive him. Rifki and Riza return with a single pack of money from the robbery, which is used to clear all of Shero and Tank's debts. The last of the money is used to hold Shero's barbecue; however, the celebration is cut short by the arrival of the cartoonist, who has taken Misscat hostage. Shero and Tank engage in one last fight against the cartoonist and finally destroy him in a gas explosion. Shero and Misscat watch the fireworks and confess their love for each other. They then have sex and end up bouncing across the world as the credits roll.

== Voice cast ==
- Uğur Yücel (Don Battee in the English version) as Şerafettin / Shero, a yellow-colored tabby cat.
- Demet Evgar as:
  - Tacettin / Taco, Shero's illegitimate son.
  - Misket / Misscat, a Turkish Angora and Shero's love interest.
- Okan Yalabık as:
  - The Cartoonist, an unnamed man who was killed by Shero in self-defense following the accidental death of a cat named Princess, whom he seeks to avenge after being reanimated.
  - Adnan, a bulldog
- Güven Kıraç as Rıza, a grey rat.
- Gökçe Özyol as Rıfkı, a white seagull who is Rıza's friend.
- Ahmet Mümtaz Taylan as Tonguç / Tank, Shero's owner.
- Yekta Kopan as Cemil / Black
- Ayşen Gruda as Hasene / Hazel
- Cezmi Baskın as Şemistan / Semi, a grocer.
- Ozan Kurtuluş as:
  - Kopek - a Dalmatian dog who is Adnan's teammate
  - An ambulance officer
- Bülent Üstün as Mertan
- Ayşe Ünal as a paramedic
- Mehmet Kurtuluş as a commissioner
- Turgut Doğru as a police officer

== Development and release ==
Bad Cat was an adaptation of the Turkish comic book series of the same name by Bülent Üstün. It was produced by Anima Istanbul. The film's producers were Mehmet Kurtuluş and Vehbi Berksoy. Australia-based Odin's Eye Entertainment acquired worldwide rights to this film at Cannes 2015. The film was attended work-in-progress session during Annecy 2015. The film went on general release across Turkey on February 5, 2016. The film was included New Turkish Cinema sections of the 35th Istanbul Film Festival. In June, it will participate in Annecy 2016 in the category "Feature Films out of competition". The film was animated using Autodesk Maya by a team of over 300 people.

The film was broadcast on Kanal D on 1 July 2017 in Turkey, and because of the content, the Radio and Television Supreme Council fined the television channel for airing the film.

After the film 's release in Turkey. The film debuted at February 2, 2017 in Panama with Panamanian Spanish dubbing, July 11, 2018 in Argentina with Argentinean Spanish dubbing, August 9, 2018 in the Middle East with English dubbing, October 18, 2018 in Portugal with European Portuguese dubbing, February 12, 2021 in India with Hindi dubbing. The film was released on DVD and Blu-ray on September 6, 2017, in Benelux with French dubbing. The film was dubbed in Polish in 2017 and screened on Cinemax Polska on August 25, 2017. In 2017, film was dubbed in Persian in Iran for Video on Demand. The film was dubbed in Brazilian Portuguese in 2019 and screened on Telecine on January 10, 2020. The film was released on DVD on September 15, 2021, in Japan with Japanese dubbing. The film was released for VOD in Russia on December 6, 2021, with Russian dubbing. In 2022, film was dubbed in Spanish and Catalan in Spain for Video on Demand. In April 2023, the film was released in the United States as an exclusive on the Tubi streaming service.

== Ratings ==
The film was rated PG-15 in the UAE but various cinema theaters of the country ignored the rating, which provoked complains from the audience.

== Awards and nominations ==
Year	Festival	Category	Result
2015	Annecy International Animated Film Festival	Work in Progress	Nominated
2016	Istanbul Film Festival	Best Debut Film Award	Nominated
2016	Neuchâtel International Fantastic Film Festival	Grand Prize of European Fantasy Film in Silver	Nominated
2016	Fantasia Film Festival	Best Animated Film Award	Nominated
2016	Absurde Séance Nantes International Film Festival	Best Feature Film	Nominated
2016	Absurde Séance Nantes International Film Festival	Prix Couillu	Won
2016	Sitges Film Festival	Best Animated Feature Film	Nominated
2016	Cinanima International Animated Film Festival	Best Feature Film	Nominated
2017	Tokyo Anime Award	Best Feature Film	Nominated
2017	SIYAD - Turkish Film Critics Association Awards	Best Fantastic Film	Won
2017	'Brussels International Fantastic Film Festival	Grand Prize of European Fantasy Film in Silver	Nominated
2017	Nashville Film Festival	Best Animated Feature Film	Nominated
2022	Universal Sci-Fi & Fantastic Film Festival	2010s Best National Fantastic Feature Film	Won
