= Five Minarets in New York =

- Theatrical Poster by Emrah Yücel
- Directed by: Mahsun Kırmızıgül
- Written by: Mahsun Kırmızıgül
- Produced by: Murat Tokat; Mevlut Akkaya
- Starring: Mahsun Kırmızıgül; Haluk Bilginer; Mustafa Sandal; Danny Glover; Gina Gershon; Robert Patrick
- Cinematography: Jim Gucciardo
- Edited by: Mustafa Presheva
- Music by: Tevfik Akbasli; Yildiray Gürgen; Mahsun Kırmızıgül
- Production company: Boyut Film
- Distributed by: Boyut Film
- Release date: 5 November 2010
- Running time: 117 minutes
- Country: Turkey
- Languages: Turkish; English
- Budget: $21 million
- Box office: $12 million

Five Minarets in New York (released as Act of Vengeance in the U.S. and as The Terrorist in Australia) is a 2010 Turkish action thriller film written, directed by, and starring Mahsun Kırmızıgül. It co-stars Haluk Bilginer, Mustafa Sandal, Danny Glover, Gina Gershon, and Robert Patrick. The plot follows two Turkish police officers sent to New York City to bring back a terrorist suspect.

The film went on nationwide general release across the United States on 5 November 2010. The title comes from the popular Turkish folk song, "Bitlis'te Beş Minare" (meaning Five Minarets in Bitlis).

== Production ==
The film, which director Mahsun Kırmızıgül wrote the story and the screenplay for around 11 years before production commenced, was shot from April to June 2010 on location in New York City, United States and Istanbul, Turkey with an estimated budget of US$20 million.

Cinematographer Jim Gucciardo shot the film in Anamorphic 35mm using an Arricam LT with Hawk Anamorphic V series lenses as the main “A” camera as well as a 1-Arri 435 for high speed sequences and a 1-Arri 235 for handheld and special Steadicam sequences. Iraqi American production designer, John El Manahi was brought in to bring authenticity to the visual style of the sets and the complex action sequences.

== Plot ==
The film follows two anti-terror officers from Istanbul, sent to New York City to find and bring back a Turkish religious man named Hadji Gümüş, who they suspect is the man they've codenamed Dajjal, a terrorist who is responsible for attacks in Turkey.

Hadji is arrested in the United States, in his home in New York City by FBI agents during prayer. His Christian wife, Maria, and American friend, Marcus (a devout Muslim convert), as well as close friends and family do what they can to protect Hadji, who they faithfully believe is innocent.

Hadji is on the Interpol list but has no criminal history in the US, so he is extradited back to Turkey instead. Acar and Firat are the two Turkish agents who are escorting him back. Acar is fluent in English and gets angry at FBI senior agent, Becker, for his hostility towards all Muslims and the Islamic faith.

The film focuses on Islamophobia in Turkey and the United States after September 11 attacks, seeking to answer the question of whether innocence or guilt even matters to one who lusts for vengeance.

In a plot twist, Hadji is the innocent devout Moslem man that he always claimed to be, while Firat who was so sure of Hadji's guilt, must come to terms with his deadly mistake in seeking vengeance in the end.

As the movie develops, Acar starts to also believe in Hadji's innocence and tries to get Firat to admit to himself that he got the wrong man, but Firat refuses to accept that he has the wrong man.

Back in Turkey, the real terrorist leaders are eventually caught, and the other agents discovered that Firat's father was supposedly killed by Hadji back in the 1970s; they realize that Firat was the one that had led them to Hadji all along.

Eventually, everyone is convinced of Hadji's innocence and he is released; but before returning to the US he wants to see his old mother again in his hometown. Firat and Acar insist on taking him and Maria themselves as a show of apology for the ordeal they've put on Hadji and his family and friends.

After reuniting with his mother and sitting outside her home, as he's introducing Maria and the two Turkish agents to his mom, Firat's grandfather shoots Hadji dead, which prompts Acar to automatically shoot the grandfather dead as well.

== Cast ==
- Mahsun Kırmızıgül as Fırat
- Haluk Bilginer as Hadji Gümüş
- Engin Altan Düzyatan as Timur
- Ali Sürmeli as Hoca
- Danny Glover as Marcus
- Gina Gershon as Maria
- Robert Patrick as Becker
- Zafer Ergin as Head of Police officer
- Hüseyin Avni Danyal as Police officer
- Salih Kalyon as Police officer
- Mustafa Sandal as Acar
- Murat Ünalmış as Ülkücü Reisi

== Marketing ==
US-based Turkish graphic artist Emrah Yücel designed the theatrical poster for the film, which features New York's signature skyline in the background with minarets rising among skyscrapers. Headshots of the film's leading cast were also added in a revised version.

Teasers showing Mahsun Kırmızıgül and Mustafa Sandal running around the streets of New York City with footage of a speech by U.S. President Barack Obama, planes crashing into the World Trade Center and a group of Muslims praying in Central Park, managed to shock and raise anticipation in Turkish Audiences.

The film was shown to distribution company officials at the American Film Market in Los Angeles, where, according to the international distributor Yarek Danielak, "We received more interest than we expected. We will invite Kırmızıgül to the U.S. for the film’s screening in the country. Everyone seeing the film is curious about its director." "Besides three American distributors, the film received great interest from many distributors throughout the world", and has also been sold to Japan, Luxembourg, the Netherlands and the United Kingdom.

== Release ==
=== Press screening ===
A special press screening in Istanbul and Ankara was scheduled for 1 November 2010 but was canceled allegedly at the instigation of director and star Mahsun Kırmızıgül because of the criticism of the Turkish Cinema Writers Association of his two previous films.

=== General release ===
The film opened in 700 screens across Turkey on November 5, 2010 at number one in the Turkish box office chart with an opening weekend gross of US$4,882,738.

Opening weekend and total gross by region
Date	Territory	Screens	Rank	Opening Weekend	Total Gross
November 5, 2010	Turkey	700	1	US$4,882,738	US$19,762,166
November 4, 2010	Germany	59	9	US$772,026	US$2,440,807
November 5, 2010	Austria	9	7	US$127,661	US$337,817

== Reception ==
=== Box office ===
The movie was at number one at the Turkish box office for four weeks and has made a total gross of US$19,762,166 in Turkey and US$20,948,284 worldwide.

=== Reviews ===
Today's Zaman reviewer Emine Yıldırım describes Mahsun Kırmızıgül as, "a director of noble intentions", who, "really tries so hard to do right by his political convictions, which can be summed up as equality, peace against violence, rage over the innocent lives taken by Middle Eastern conflicts and an obstinate stand against Islamic fundamentalism." But, "It’s almost like you’re not watching a movie but listening to an oration during a campaign by a political figure", and, "his characters are not genuine characters but are cardboard avatars of the actor-director-screenwriter voicing his opinions in blatant dialogues that lack any kind of sophistication or notion of literary value." Yıldırım does however single out Haluk Bilginer for praise by stating that, "Despite the script, he still comes off clean as one of the most talented and charismatic Turkish actors of his generation. He is the sole reason that anyone should watch this movie", and, "his performance duly delivers what Kırmızıgül cannot achieve through his script: the notion of being pious without being oppressive, a peace-loving person motivated by compassion and openness." Of Kırmızıgül himself Yıldırım writes, "the man does have a peculiar screen charisma, and he knows really well that mass Turkish audiences love macho-fueled simplified revenge fantasies of oppressed groups and grandiose melodramas. Of course, at the end of the day, box office numbers will prove if this thesis is correct", and "I still have hopes that one day these underlying good intentions will lead to decent cinema."

== See also ==
- 2010 in film
