= The Miracle (2015 film) =

- Directed by: Mahsun Kırmızıgül
- Written by: Mahsun Kırmızıgül
- Produced by: Tekin Dogan, Murat Tokat
- Starring: Mahsun Kırmızıgül; Talat Bulut
- Cinematography: Soykut Turan
- Music by: Tevfik Akbasli, Yildiray Gürgen, Mahsun Kirmizigül
- Release date: 1 January 2015
- Running time: 136 minutes
- Country: Turkey
- Language: Turkish

The Miracle (Turkish: Mucize, pronounced [mud͡ʒize]) is a 2015 Turkish drama film directed by Mahsun Kırmızıgül. The movie received a sequel called The Miracle 2: Love (Turkish: Mucize 2 Aşk) in 2019.

== Background ==
This film is remarked towards the Kurdish culture and village Set in the 1960s a school teacher is transferred from the city to a remote mountain village in Turkey against the wishes of his family. After having a long journey by bus to the last station, he has to take a long walk over two mountains to reach his destination. When he arrives, he discovers that not only is the village impoverished and lacking most modern conveniences, but doesn't even have a school.

Initially it seems that the movie is centered on the school teacher, Mahir. It doesn't take much time to realize that the film is actually about the village and the villagers their culture and traditions, their humility, their problems.

== Plot ==
In 1960, schoolteacher Mahir Yılmaz is transferred to a remote Kurdish village in Eastern Turkey against the wishes of his family. Upon reaching the village after a long hike, the residents initially scare him with guns before informing him that they have no school. Mahir raises funds for building the school by phoning home and feigning getting kidnapped for ransom. He also seeks help from the local outlaws, who are actually residents of the village, in building the school, after which, he begins his duties. One of his students is Aziz, the intellectually handicapped son of the village Chief who, with Mahir's encouragement, is determined to prove himself in class despite being ridiculed for what turns out to be muscular dystrophy.

After Aziz' father saves a man from a murder attempt, the latter offers the hand of his daughter Mizgin to Aziz in gratitude, despite warnings that he is handicapped. Mizgin initially despairs of her new husband but gradually accepts him. However, the couple are adversely affected by the ridicule they receive from the villagers and after Mizgin breaks down, Aziz moves out of the village with her, leaving a sorrowful note to explain his actions and promising to return one day. Later, Mahir receives another assignment and moves out, receiving gratitude from the villagers.

Seven years later, Mahir travels to the village on its newly-built road and introduces his family. He then reveals a fully healed Aziz, along with Mizgin and their children. Asked by his father how he was cured, Aziz replies that he fell in love with his wife.

== Cast ==
- Mahsun Kırmızıgül - Mahir Yılmaz
- Talat Bulut - Muallim Mahir
- Mert Turak - Aziz
- Cezmi Baskın - Isa
- Tansel Öngel - Cemilo
- Adem Atbas - Fehmi
- Ali Sürmeli - Haydar
- Büşra Pekin - Gule
- Meral Çetinkaya -
- seda tosun - Mizgin (aziz wife)
