= Mommo the Bogeyman =

- Theatrical poster
- Directed by: Atalay Taşdiken
- Written by: Atalay Taşdiken
- Produced by: Atalay Taşdiken
- Starring: Elif Bülbül; Mehmet Bülbül; Mete Dönmezer
- Cinematography: Ali Özel
- Music by: Erkan Oğur
- Release date: 17 April 2009
- Running time: 94 minutes
- Country: Turkey
- Language: Turkish

Mommo the Bogeyman (Turkish: Mommo: Kız Kardeşim) is a 2009 Turkish drama film, written, produced and directed by Atalay Taşdiken, about two young siblings who find refuge with their grandfather after their mother dies and their father's new wife rejects them. The film, which went on nationwide general release across Turkey on 17 April 2009, won the Audience Award at the Würzburg International Filmweekend and was nominated in several categories at the 3rd Yeşilçam Awards.

== Plot ==
Two young siblings, Ahmet and Ayse, find refuge with their grandfather after their mother dies and their father's new wife rejects them. The old man however is not able to care for them and finally has to take the children apart. This simple, poignant tale of a village, and the relationship between a brother and sister, portrays very gritty living circumstances in rural Anatolia.

== Production ==
The film was shot on location in Konya, Turkey.

== Reception ==
=== Awards ===
- Würzburg International Filmweekend - Audience Award (Won)

== See also ==
- 2009 in film
- Turkish films of 2009
