= Erdal Beşikçioğlu =

Turkish actor and politician (born 1970)

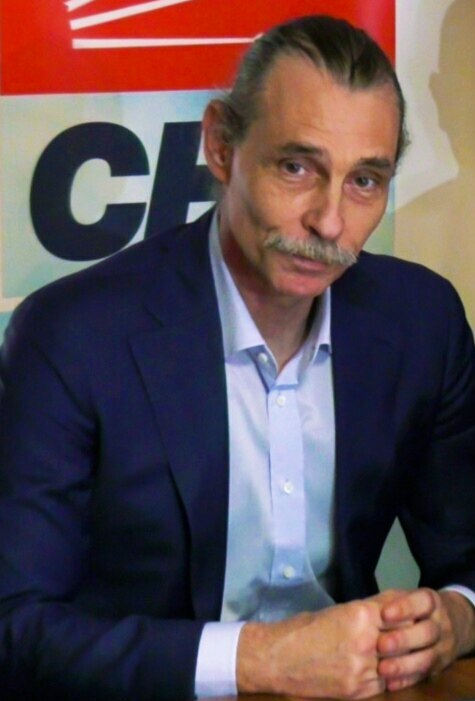
- Beşikçioğlu in January 2024

Mayor of Etimesgut
- Suspended
- In office 4 April 2024 – 3 August 2026
- Preceded by: Enver Demirel

Personal details
- Born: 5 January 1970 (age 56) Ankara, Turkey
- Party: Republican People's Party
- Spouse: Elvin Beşikçioğlu
- Children: 2
- Education: Hacettepe University Ankara State Conservatory
- Occupation: Actor; politician

Erdal Beşikçioğlu (Turkish pronunciation: [æɾˈdaɫ beʃictʃiˈoːɫu]; born 5 January 1970) is a Turkish actor and politician. He is the elected mayor of the Etimesgut municipality in Ankara Province. He was suspended from office after being arrested on August 3, 2026.

== Biography ==
Erdal Beşikçioğlu is of paternal Laz and maternal Albanian descent. He is a maternal nephew of İlhan Cavcav.

Beşikçioğlu attended İzmir Private Turkish College and Mehmet Seyfi Eraltay High School after which he studied at the Hacettepe University State Conservatory in Ankara. He participated in creative workshops with William Gaskill among others. Upon graduating, he started working in several state theatres and was head of the Diyarbakır State Theatre between 1995 and 1996.

He has acted in a number of films such as Eve Giden Yol 1914, Barda, Hayat Var, Kurtlar Vadisi Filistin and the Golden Bear winning Bal.

He portrayed as Faruk Yazıcı in series Köprü and film Vali. Since 2010, He stars as the title character Police commissioner Behzat Ç in the series "Behzat Ç" which has two films, one spin off series and one sequel series. Erdal Beşikçioğlu won the Golden Orange for Best Actor for his role in Behzat Ç.: Seni Kalbime Gömdüm. He is brilliant in the TV series 46 as Dr, Murat Gurnay, in a black comedy take on the Jekyll and Hyde story alternately dark and menacing and then playful and sensitive.

He is married to the actress Elvin Beşikçioğlu. He is also theatre director and the owner of Tatbikat Sahnesi theaters located in Ankara and Istanbul.

In the 2024 local elections in Turkey, he became the mayoral candidate for the Republican People's Party in Etimesgut, Ankara Province. Beşikçioğlu, who received the majority of the votes, was elected Mayor of Etimesgut.

== Filmography ==
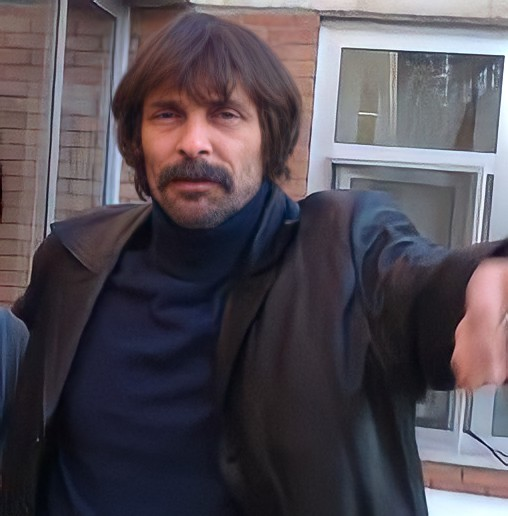
Beşikçioğlu in 2011

=== Film ===
- Bergen (2022)
- Acı Kiraz (2020)
- Kapı (2019)
- Çiçero (2019)
- Fakat Müzeyyen Bu Derin Bir Tutku (2014)
- Behzat Ç. Ankara Yanıyor (2013)
- Behzat Ç. Seni Kalbime Gömdüm (2011)
- Kurtlar Vadisi Filistin (2010)
- Bal (2010)
- Kardelen (2010)
- Vali (2009)
- Vali (2008)
- Hayat Var (2008)
- Eve Giden Yol (2006)
- Barda (2006)

=== Television ===
- Hakim (2022)
- Kağıt Ev (2021)
- Çocukluk (2020)
- Adı Efsane (2017)
- 46 Yok Olan (2016)
- Reaksiyon (2014)
- Leyla ile Mecnun (2011)
- Behzat Ç. Bir Ankara Polisiyesi (2010–2013)
- Es-Es (2008)
- Ayrılık (2009)
- Köprü (2006–2008)
- Seni Çok Özledim (2005)
- Ödünç Hayat (2005)
- Körfez Ateşi (2005)
- Kasırga İnsanları (2004)
- Mars Kapıdan Baktırır (2004)
- Tatlı Hayat (2003)

=== Internet ===
- Çekiç ve Gül: Bir Behzat Ç. Hikayesi (2022–present)
- Hamlet (2021)
- Behzat Ç. Bir Ankara Polisiyesi (2019)
