= Pandora's Box (2008 film) =

2008 Turkish film by Yeşim Ustaoğlu

- Theatrical poster
- Directed by: Yeşim Ustaoğlu
- Written by: Sema Kaygusuz; Yasemin Ustaoğlu
- Starring: Tsilla Chelton; Derya Alabora; Ovul Avkiran
- Cinematography: Jacques Besse
- Edited by: Franck Nakache
- Music by: Jean-Pierre Mas
- Production company: Ustaoğlu Film
- Release dates: September 6, 2008 (Toronto International Film Festival); January 23, 2009 (Turkey)
- Running time: 112 minutes
- Country: Turkey
- Language: Turkish

Pandora's Box (Turkish: Pandora'nın Kutusu) is a 2008 Turkish drama film directed by Yeşim Ustaoğlu.

== Plot ==
Two sisters and a brother living in the centre of Istanbul are confronted with the care for their dementing mother who they brought back with them from the mountains near the Black Sea where she lived.

As the siblings start reminiscing about their mother, the tensions between them quickly become apparent; like a Pandora's Box which is spilled open, all the unresolved disputes are scattered around. The confrontation with their mother's sordidness brings them to realize how poor their own lives are. It is only the oldest daughter's rebellious son Murat who empathizes with the old woman and an unusual alliance is born between the two.

== Reception ==
=== Reviews ===
Eddie Cockrell, writing in Variety, describes the film as a, confident, satisfying drama and that, Helmer and co-scripter Yesim Ustaoglu brings a novelist's feel for pace and character development to a story that, at close to two hours, could wear out its welcome but deftly avoids drag. He also writes that, French-born vet Tsilla Chelton gives a remarkable performance as an Alzheimer's-afflicted country matriarch juggled among a trio of urban Istanbul siblings, and, Ninety-year-old Chelton slips much deadpan humor into her otherwise utterly respectful portrayal, with other thesps fine in support. He adds that the, Tech package is accomplished, with a trio of production designers creating persuasively authentic living spaces that point up the gulf between city and country, traditional and modern, and concludes, Pic's unemphasized clash between old and new provides fascinating glimpses of a country in transition.

Joanne Laurier, reporting on the Toronto International Film Festival for World Socialist Website, writes that, The inner and outer worlds of the protagonists are well dramatized. Of all the characters, however, Nesrin with her upper middle class and invasive tension is the most developed, however, What is weak about Pandora’s Box, however, is that in its critique of an isolating, urban setting, it seems to long for a simpler, less complicated time and place. How helpful is that?

=== Awards ===
- 56th San Sebastián International Film Festival
  - Golden Seashell: Yeşim Ustaoğlu (Won)
  - Silver Seashell for Best Actress: Tsilla Chelton (Tied with Melissa Leo for Frozen River)
- 27th Fajr International Film Festival, "World Panorama" section (February 3, 2009)
  - Crystal Simorgh for Best Performance: Tsilla Chelton, Derya Alabora and Ovul Avkiran
  - Crystal Simorgh of Special Jury Prize: Yeşim Ustaoğlu
- 11th Cinemanila International Film Festival
  - Best Actress: Tsilla Chelton (Won)
- 3rd Yeşilçam Awards (March 23, 2010)
  - Best Supporting Actress: Derya Alabora (Won)

== See also ==
- 2008 in film
- Turkish films of 2008
