= In Darkness (2009 film) =

- Theatrical poster
- Directed by: Çağan Irmak
- Written by: Çağan Irmak
- Produced by: Mustafa Oğuz
- Starring: Meral Çetinkaya; Erdem Akakçe; Derya Alabora
- Cinematography: Gökhan Tiryaki
- Edited by: Bora Gökşingöl
- Production company: Most Production
- Distributed by: Cinefilm
- Release date: October 2, 2009
- Running time: 88 minutes
- Country: Turkey
- Language: Turkish

In Darkness (Turkish: Karanlıktakiler) is a 2009 Turkish drama film written and directed by Çağan Irmak.

== Plot ==
Egemen is an advertising agency clerk in his thirties who has to share a roof with his mentally ill mother, Gülseren. Having to endure his mother's anxieties and mental black outs, his only outlet is his workplace; where he feels he can breathe and escape the hell that is his home, even if it is for a little while. But Egemen's amorous interest in his boss Umay unveils little by little just how much Gulseren has emotionally damaged her son.

== See also ==
- 2009 in film
- Turkish films of 2009
