= Binnur Kaya =

Turkish actress (born 1972)

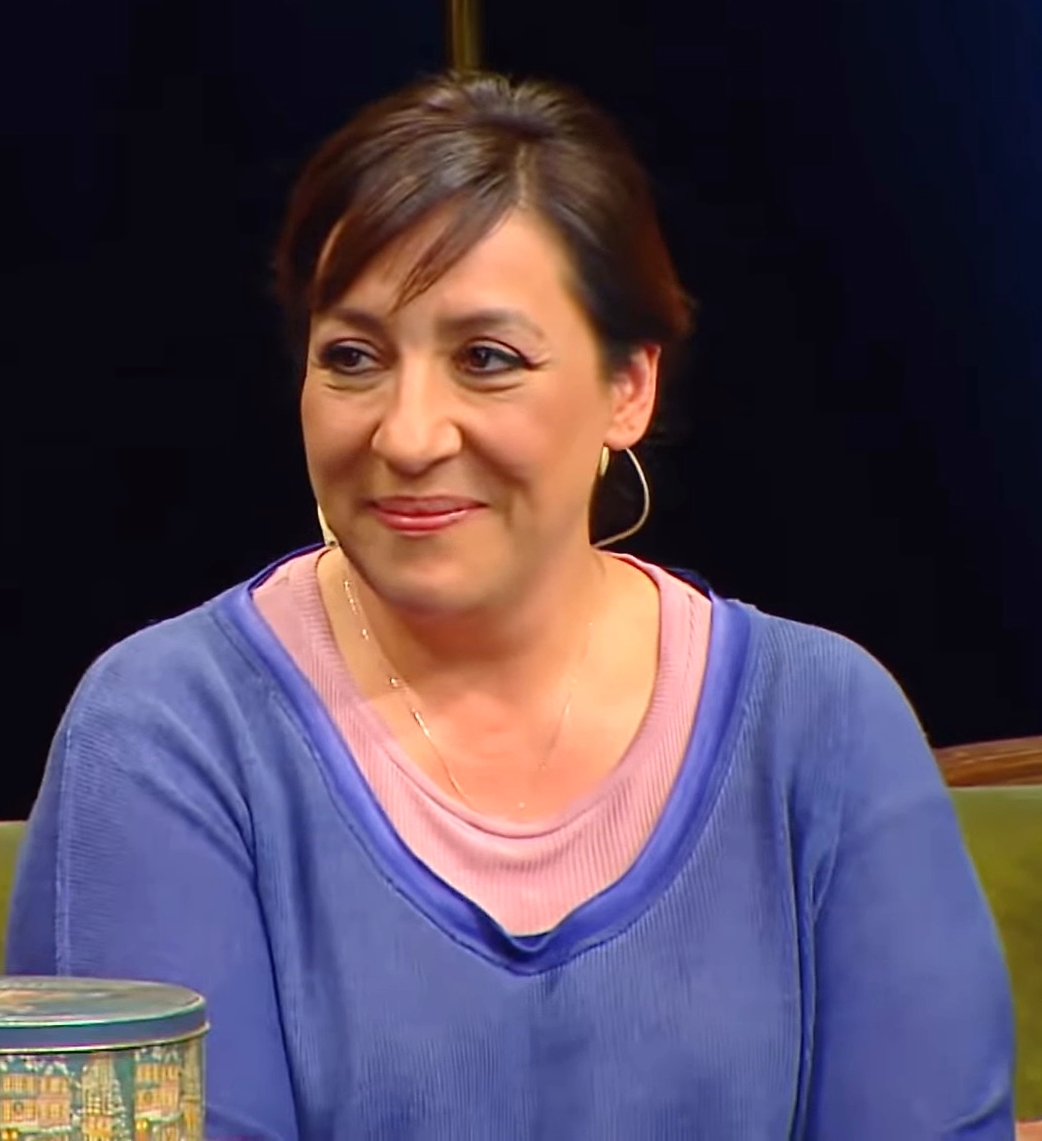
- Kaya on Tolgshow in 2018
- Born: 19 April 1972 (age 54); Ankara, Turkey
- Occupation: Actress
- Years active: 1996–present

Binnur Kaya (born 19 April 1972) is a Turkish actress.

== Biography ==
Binnur Kaya graduated in theatre from Bilkent University in 1995. She went to Istanbul where she worked at the Ankara Sahnesi and Karatahta Child Theatres and then at the Bakırköy Municipal Theatre. Through a friend she met at the Bakırköy Municipal Theatre, she made her television debut as Asiye on the Hülya Avşar Show. She joined the BKM theatre troupe and appeared with them in such as Bir Demet Tiyatro, Bekârlar and Bana Bir Şeyhler Oluyor.

Later, she appeared in the series Dış Kapının Mandalları directed by her close friend Engin Günaydın in 1998 and then in other popular series like Çarli, Yabancı Damat, 7 Numara, Kaynanalar and Baba Evi. She played numerous roles in Bir Demet Tiyatro. In 2003, she appeared in the film İnşaat directed by Ömer Vargı. Then she acted in the films Babam ve Oğlum, Abuzer Kadayıf, Küçük Kıyamet and Hayatımın Kadınısın.

Between 2007 and 2008, she played two roles as Dilber and Şahika Koçarslanlı in the hit sitcom Avrupa Yakası.

Kaya received a lot of acclaim for her role in the 2009 film Vavien, winning several awards including the SİYAD award for Best Actress and the Yeşilçam award for Best Actress.

In 2010, she had leading role in comedy series Türk Malı. She wasn't cast in 2017 version Türk Malı.

== Filmography ==
Film
Year	Title	Role	Notes
1998	Kaçıklık Diploması		
2000	Abuzer Kadayıf		
2000	Muhallebicinin Oğlu		
2000	Abuzer Kadayıf		
2003	İnşaat	Ayşe	
2005	Babam ve Oğlum	Hanife	
2006	Hayatımın Kadınısın	Firdevs	
2006	Küçük Kıyamet	Filiz	
2009	Kampüste Çıplak Ayaklar	Parvati, Esin	
2009	Vavien	Sevilay	
2011	Türkan	Kumru Hemşire	
2013	Mutlu Aile Defteri	Asuman	
2014	Şarkı Söyleyen Kadınlar	Esma	
2017	Sen Kiminle Dans Ediyorsun?	Şengül	
2018	Bizi Hatırla	Fatoş	
2019	Cinayet Süsü	Asuman	
2021	Azizler	Kamuran	
2021	Sen Ben Lenin	İffet	
2024	Ayşe	Ayşe	
Web series
Year	Title	Role	Notes
2023	Necati Başkadır		
Television series
Year	Title	Role	Notes
1996	Kaynanalar	Rukiye	
1997	Baba Evi	Meryem	
1998	Dış Kapının Mandalları	Saliha	
1998	Tele Dadı		
1999	Çarli	Hijyen	
2000–2002	Bir Demet Tiyatro	Berna / Maniac / Pala Şamuran	
2000	Güneş Yanıkları	Aylin	
2001	Benimle Evlenir Misin?	Gaye Şenoğlu	
2001	Yeni Hayat	Gülistan	
2003	Hadi Uç Bakalım	Düriye	
2003	7 Numara	Hürrem	
2003	Bekârlar	Binnur	
2004–2007	Yabancı Damat	Nazire Demir	
2007	Kavak Yelleri		Guest appearance
2007	Karayılan	Antepli Emine	
2007–2009	Avrupa Yakası	Şahika Koçarslanlı / Aunt Dilber	
2010	Türk Malı	Abiye Kuzu	
2011	Muhteşem Yüzyıl	Prayer	Guest appearance
2013–2015	Aramızda Kalsın	Hüsne Celepoğlu	Leading role
2015	Analar ve Anneler	Neriman	
2017	Bu Sayılmaz	Küçük Semiha	
2019	Zengin ve Yoksul	Berrin Taştan	
2020–2022	Kırmızı Oda	Doctor Manolya Yadigaroğlu / Doctor Hanım	Leading role
2020	Doğduğun Ev Kaderindir	Doctor Manolya Yadigaroğlu / Doctor Hanım	Guest appearance
2021–2022	Masumlar Apartmanı	Doctor Manolya Yadigaroğlu / Doctor Hanım	Guest appearance
2022–2023	Güzel Günler	Kıymet	Leading role
2023–2024	Yalı Çapkını	Nükhet	
2026	Tuzlu Kahve	Hatun Aydınoğlu	
Theatre
Year	Title	Role	Notes
	Kadınlar Koğuşu		
	Bir Yaz Dönümü Gecesi Rüyası		
1999	Sen Hiç Ateşböceği Gördün mü?		
	Bana Bir Şeyhler Oluyor		
2016	Kozalar		
	Fiddler on the Roof		
2019	God of Carnage		
