= Serhat Tutumluer =

Turkish actor (born 1972)

- Born: 29 June 1972 (age 54); Eskişehir, Turkey
- Education: Hacettepe University
- Occupations: Cinema, TV and theatre actor
- Years active: 1995–present
- Spouse: Senan Kara (m. 2007)

Serhat Tutumluer (born 29 June 1972) is a Turkish actor. His period series are Filinta, Vatanım Sensin, Alparslan: Büyük Selçuklu.

Other notable series are Hercai, "Sahra", "Ezo Gelin" from true story alongside Nurgül Yeşilçay, Umutsuz Ev Kadınları adaptation of Desperate Housewives.

== Biography ==
Serhat Tutumluer began studying sociology at Istanbul University but later went to Ankara State Conservatory where he graduated in theatre. Between 1995 and 1997, he worked at the Ankara State Theatre. He won the Best Actor Award at the 27th Istanbul Film Festival for his performance in Ara. He won the best actor award at the 14th Sadri Alışık Cinema and Theater Awards for his performance in Devirim Arablari.

== Filmography ==
=== Television ===
Year	Title	Role
1995–1996	Tersine Akan Nehir	
2003	Çaylak	Asım
2004	Kasırga İnsanları	Alphan
2004	Sahra	Mithat
2006	Esir Kalpler	Demir Uyguner
2006	Erkekler Ağlamaz	Murat
2007	Ezo gelin	Kadim
2008	Ay Işığı	Kemal
2009	Kül ve Ateş	Ömer
2010	Güneydoğudan Öyküler Önce Vatan	Metin
2011–2014	Umutsuz Ev Kadınları	Sinan
2014–2015	Filinta	Boris Zaharyas
2016	Oyunbozan	Mahir Yamaner
2017	Vatanım Sensin	Kostas
2018	Bir Umut Yeter	Kenan Akar
2019–2021	Hercai	Hazar Şadoğlu
2022–2023	Alparslan: Büyük Selçuklu	Tekfur Grigor
2023	Kirli Sepeti	Yılmaz
2025-2026	Teşkilat	Rutkay

=== Film ===
Year	Title	Role	Director
2004	Büyü	Tarık	Orhan Oğuz
2005	Cenneti Beklerken	Eflatun	Derviş Zaim
2007	Ara	Veli	Ümit Ünal
2008	Devrim Arabaları	Ismet	Tolga Örnek
2009	Kıskanmak	Halit	Zeki Demirkubuz
2012	Yeraltı	Cevat	Zeki Demirkubuz

=== Theatre ===
- Yastık Adam (Mehmet Ergen)
- Kız Tavlama Sanatı (Talimhane Theatre-Mehmet Ergen)
- Oyunun Oyunu (İstanbul BKM – Mehmet Ergen)
- Bir Sevda Türküsü (Ankara State Theatre – Ejder Akışık)
- Budala (Ankara State Theatre – Bozkurt Kuruç)
- Giordano Bruno (Ankara State Theatre – Erhan Gökgücü)
- Küçük Nasrettin – Kukla Oyunu (Ankara State Theatre – Soner Ağın)
- Aşk Delisi (Aksanat – Mehmet Ergen)
- Bir de Yolluk (Aksanat – Mehmet Ergen)
- Küller Küllere (Aksanat – Mehmet Ergen)
- Hamlet (İzmit City Theatre – Işıl Kasapoğlu)
- Sokağa Çıkma Yasağı (İzmit City Theatre – Cüneyt Çalışkur)
- Hakimiyet-i Milliye Aşevi (İzmit City Theatre – Cüneyt Türel)
- Nasrettin Hoca (İzmit City Theatre – Işıl Kasapoğlu and Melih Düzenli)
- Kuvayi Milliye Destanı – Kukla Oyunu (İzmit City Theatre – Melih Düzenli)
- Üç Kuruşluk Opera (İzmit City Theatre – M.Kith Kay)
- Karar Kimin (İzmit City Theatre – Şakir Gürzumar)
- İsli Sisli Pis Puslu (İzmit City Theatre – Yaşar Özveri and Yücel Ertan)
- Bahar Noktası (İzmit City Theatre – Yücel Ertan)
- Şahmeran Hikayesi – Gölge Kukla Oyunu (İzmit City Theatre – Ebru Kara Dehekli)
- Cimri (İzmit City Theatre)
- Yedi Cüceler ve Dev (Eskişehir – Children's Play)
