= Settar Tanrıöğen =

Turkish actor (born 1960)

- Born: 22 October 1960 (age 64); Denizli, Turkey
- Occupation: Actor
- Years active: 1994–present

Settar Tanrıöğen (born 22 October 1960) is a Turkish actor.

== Selected filmography ==
=== Film ===
List of film appearances, with year, title, and role shown
| Year | Title | Role | Notes |
|---|---|---|---|
| 1996 | The Bandit | Laz Naci | |
| 1998 | The Wound | | |
| 2004 | Toss-Up | Zeyyat | |
| 2006 | Takva: A Man's Fear of God | Ali Bey | |
| 2006 | Destiny | Bekir's father | |
| 2007 | Kutsal Damacana | Hoca | |
| 2009 | Vavien | Cemal | |
| 2010 | When We Leave | Kader | |
| 2010 | Majority | Kemal | |
| 2010 | Shadows and Faces | Cevdet | |

=== Television ===
List of television appearances, with year, title, and role shown
| Year | Title | Role | Notes |
|---|---|---|---|
| 1998–2000 | Second Spring | Vakkas Resuloğlu | 9 episodes |
| 2008 | Gece Gündüz | Kemal | 12 episodes |
| 2020 | Ethos | Ali Sadi Hoca | 8 episodes |
| 2024 | A Round of Applause | | |
