= Mahsun Kırmızıgül =

Turkish singer, actor, director and screenwriter (born 1969)

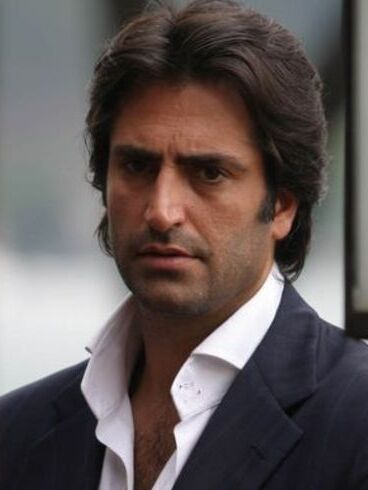
- Kırmızıgül in 2006

Background information
- Born: Abdullah Bazencir; 26 March 1969 (age 57); Hani, Turkey
- Genres: Turkish folk music; arabesque; fantasia Director Cinematographer Cameraman
- Instruments: Bağlama; oud; piano
- Years active: 1984–present
- Labels: Güneş Plak (1984–1988); Türküola Müzik (1989); Barış Müzik (1990–1995); Nokta Müzik (1992–1993); Prestij Müzik (1993–2001); Kral Müzik (1995); Popüler Müzik (2002–2004); A1 Müzik (2004–2006); DMC (2011)
- Spouses: Gölgem Satarlı (m. 1989; div. 1992) Ece Binay (m. 2016–2022)
- Partner(s): Bade İşcil (1999–2003); Beren Saat (2004–2005)
- Website: mahsunkirmizigul.com

Mahsun Kırmızıgül (born Abdullah Bazencir, 26 March 1969) is a Turkish - Kurdish singer-songwriter, actor and director, scriptwriter, music composer, and producer of Zaza descent. Mahsun Kırmızıgül is also known as a businessman for his partnership in one of the leading music production companies, Prestij Müzik, in Turkey until 2002.

== Life ==
Mahsun Kırmızıgül was born on 26 March 1969 in Hani, Diyarbakır, Turkey. His birth name is Abdullah Bazencir and he is of Zaza origin. He is one of the 22 children of his father Çerkez Bezencir and mother Faika Bezencir. He studied at primary and secondary schools in Diyarbakır. He worked to contribute to his family from an early age. He sang for weddings to earn money. In 1984, he was invited to Istanbul to make an album for Güneş Plak. He started to study in the Voice Department of Istanbul University-Turkish Music Conservatory.

Kırmızıgül started his music studies in 1980 and made eight amateur albums. His professional debut album Alem Buysa Kral Sensin was released in 1993 reached the top of the music lists. In 1994, he joined Prestige Music Company as a producer. The artist won acclaim with his film Beyaz Melek which he wrote, directed and acted in. In 2009, he released Güneşi Gördüm, which he wrote, directed and acted in. In 2010, he released New York'ta Beş Minare, which he wrote, directed, acted in and composed the music.

== Discography ==
Studio albums

- Bu da Yeter / Yüce Dağ Başında (1984) Güneş Plak
- Yürek Yarası / Ehçelere Kaldım (1985) Güneş Plak
- Terkedildim / Tut Elimden (21 November 1986) Güneş Plak
- Sarışınım (8 June 1987) Güneş Plak / Bir Demet Gül - Destan
- Paylaşamam / Acamadım (22 August 1988) Güneş Plak
- Şimdiki Zaman / Güneş Gibi (15 June 1990) Barış Müzik
- 1990: Bahtı Kara / Hazalim (Barış Müzik)
- Nilüfer (7 November 1991) Nokta Müzik
- Alem Buysa Kral Sensin (4 February 1993) Nokta Müzik
- 12'den Vuracağım (20 September 1994) Prestij Müzik
- İnsan Hakları (25 October 1995) Kral Müzik - Prestij Müzik
- Sevdalıyım - Hemşerim (2 October 1996) Prestij Müzik
- Yıkılmadım (3 June 1998) Prestij Müzik
- Yoruldum (30 June 2000) Prestij Müzik
- Ülkem Ağlar (8 August 2001) Prestij Müzik
- Yüzyılın Türküleri (2002) Popüler Müzik - Prestij Müzik
- Sarı Sarı - Başroldeyim (16 April 2004) A1 Müzik
- Dinle (2 June 2006) A1 Müzik
- Hoş Geldin (1 January 2022) A1 Müzik

Compilation albums

- İstanbul Geceleri (1989) Türküola
- Acılar İçinde (1992) Destan Müzik
- Dünden Bugüne (11 January1995) Günes Plak
- Mutlu Ol (1995) Barış Müzik
- Nostalji 1 (1997) Güneş Plak
- Bir Demet Kırmızıgül (2003) Prestij Müzik

Singles

- İnsan Hakları (1995) Kral Müzik
- Ülkem Ağlar (2001) Prestij Müzik
- Küçük Gelin (2011) A1 Müzik
- Yoksun Sen (2019) A1 Müzik

== Filmography ==
=== TV series ===
- Alem Buysa... (1993)
- Bu Sevda Bitmez (1996)
- Hemşerim (1996)
- Yıkılmadım (1999)
- Zalım (2003)
- Aşka Sürgün (2005)
- Hayat Devam Ediyor (2011–2013) - general director – story
- Benim İçin Üzülme (2012) - general director – story
- Babalar ve Evlatlar (2012) – story

=== Cinema ===
- Yaşamak Haram Oldu (1987) as actor
- Beyaz Melek (2007) as actor, director, scriptwriter
- Güneşi Gördüm (2009) as actor, director, scriptwriter
- Gecenin Kanatları (2009) as scriptwriter
- New York'ta Beş Minare (2010) as actor, director, scriptwriter
- Mucize (2015) as actor, director, scriptwriter
- Vezir Parmağı (2017) as actor, director, scriptwriter
- Mucize 2: Aşk (2019) as actor, director, scriptwriter

== Awards ==
- Kral TV Music Awards 1999
  - Best male Arabesque singer
  - Best song
  - Best selling song
- Hürriyet Altın Kelebek 1999
  - Best musician
  - Best Selling Album 2006
