= Cezmi Baskın =

Turkish actor (born 1949)

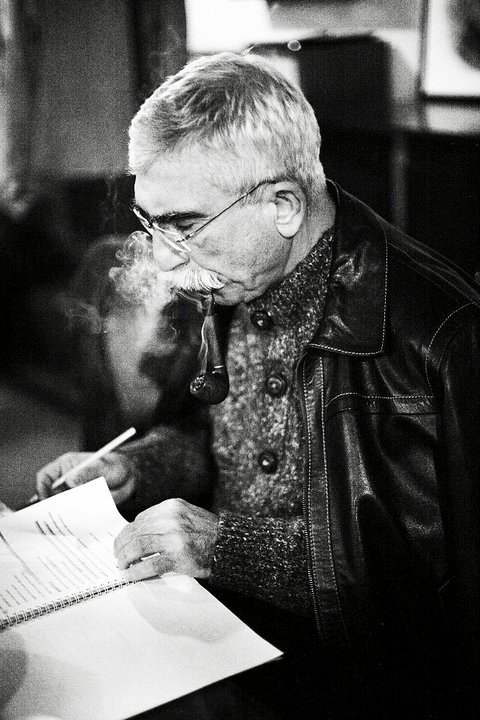
- Born: 11 March 1949 (age 77); Istanbul, Turkey
- Occupation: Actor
- Years active: 1970–present
- Spouse: Çisel Baskın (m. 2005)

Cezmi Baskın (born 11 March 1949) is a Turkish actor. He has appeared in more than sixty films since the 1970s.

== Selected filmography ==
Year	Title	Role	Notes
1989–2002	Bizimkiler	Sitki	
1993–1998	Yazlıkçılar	Kör Yaşar	
1999	Kahpe Bizans		
2001	Vizontele		
2004	G.O.R.A.	Tocha	
2006	The International		
2007	The Masked Gang: Iraq		
2009	Jolly Life		
2009–2012	Akasya Durağı		
2014	Hayat Sana Güzel		
2014	Bizum Hoca		
2015	Mucize		
2016	Bad Cat	Semistan	voice only
2017	Kayıtdışı		
2019–2021	Kuzey Yıldızı İlk Aşk	Yaşar	
2021-2024	Yargı	Merdan Kaya	
2024	İnci Taneleri	Edip Dindem	
2024	Bir Gece Masalı	Capir Karoglu	
2025	Sustalı Ceylan	Veysi	
