= Engin Günaydın =

Turkish actor and comedian

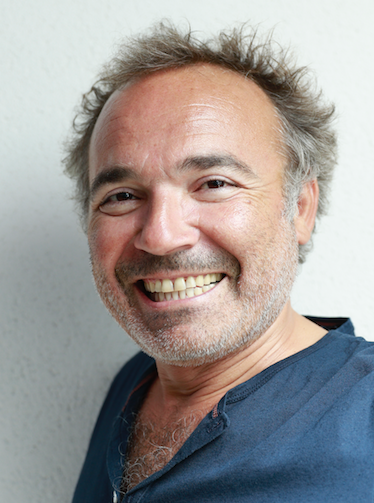
- Born: 23 January 1972 (age 54); Erbaa, Tokat Province, Turkey
- Education: Mimar Sinan University
- Occupation: Actor
- Awards: 2012 Best Actor-Golden Boll Award

Engin Günaydın (born 23 January 1972) is a Turkish actor and comedian.

== Biography ==
Günaydın was born in Erbaa, Tokat Province. He began his university studies at Hacettepe University Conservatory, but in his second year he switched to Mimar Sinan University from where he graduated in theatre.

In 1997, he had a small role in Otogargara which caused him to be cast in the television series Bir Demet Tiyatro where he played Zabıta İrfan. Later he acted in Aşkım Aşkım with Mehmet Ali Erbil and Emel Sayın. In 2001, he acted in Zeki Demirkubuz's film Yazgı for which he received the Best Supporting Actor Award at the Ankara Film Festival. In 2004, he began doing sketches on Okan Bayülgen's show.

In 2005, he accepted an offer from Gülse Birsel and joined the cast of the sitcom Avrupa Yakası as Burhan Altıntop, his most famous role. In 2009, he wrote the screenplay of and starred in Vavien directed by the Taylan Brothers. For this, he won a number of screenwriting awards at the Istanbul Film Festival, Yeşilçam Awards and the SİYAD awards. He played in "Galip Derviş" adaptation of Monk.

Additionally, he did a series of stand up shows titled O Hikayedeki Mal Benim.

He shared the Adana Golden Boll International Film Festival's Best Actor Award in 2012 together with İlyas Salman for his role in Inside.

== Filmography ==
Film
Year	Name	Role
2001	Yazgı	Necati
2004	Yazı Tura	Sencer
2004	G.O.R.A.	Journal Editor
2005	Takva: A Man's Fear of God	Erol
2009	Vavien	Celal
2012	Yeraltı	Muharrem
2015	İçimdeki Ses	Selim
2017	Nerelerdesiniz	Numan
2017	Aile Arasında	Fikret
2021	Azizler	Aziz
Television
Year	Name	Role
1997	Bir Demet Tiyatro	Municipal Police İrfan
2000	Güneş Yanıkları	Sacit
2001	Aşkım Aşkım	Tarık Usta
2002	Zor Baba	Bilal
2003	Alacakaranlık	
2003	Hadi Uç Bakalım	Senayi
2004	Size Baba Diyebilir Miyim?	Mahir
2005–2009	Avrupa Yakası	Burhan Altıntop
2011	Üsküdar'a Giderken	Muhtar
2011	Muhteşem Yüzyıl	Gül Ağa
2013–2014	Galip Derviş	Galip Derviş
2020–	10 Bin Adım	Mehmet

Awards
Preceded by Durukan Ordu	Golden Boll Award for Best Actor; 2012 with İlyas Salman for Inside	Succeeded by Ercan Kesal
