= Meral Çetinkaya =

Turkish actress (born 1945)

- Born: 5 March 1945 (age 81); Bursa, Turkey
- Occupation: Actress
- Years active: 1979–present
- Spouse: Yavuzer Çetinkaya (m. 1992; died 1992)

Meral Onuktav Çetinkaya (born 5 March 1945) is a Turkish film actress. She has appeared in more than twenty films since 1962.

== Filmography ==
Film
| Year | Title | Role | Notes |
|---|---|---|---|
| 1979 | Hazal | | |
| 1983 | Duvar | Kadın Mahkûm | |
| 1984 | Firar | Meral | |
| 1984 | Bir Yudum Sevgi | Nezaket | |
| 1985 | Bir Avuç Cennet | | |
| 1987 | Geyikler, Annem ve Almanya | | |
| 1987 | Suda Yanar | | |
| 1988 | Ponente Feneri | | |
| 1988 | Herşeye Rağmen | Hasan's sister | |
| 1989 | Kantodan Tangoya | | |
| 1989 | Medcezir Manzaraları | Emel | |
| 1989 | Uçurtmayı Vurmasınlar | Safinaz | |
| 1990 | İki Başlı Dev | Hafize | |
| 1991 | Suyun Öte Yanı | | |
| 1992 | Denize Hançer Düştü | | |
| 1992 | Çıplak | | |
| 1992 | Piano Piano Bacaksız | Münevver | |
| 1993 | Yaz Yağmuru | | |
| 1994 | İz | | |
| 1996 | Solgun Bir Sarı Gül | | |
| 1996 | 80. Adım | Zeynep | |
| 1998 | Kaç Para Kaç | Customer | |
| 1999 | Eylül Fırtınası | Sultan | |
| 1999 | Duruşma | Neighbor | |
| 2000 | Vizontele | Nevin | |
| 2001 | Maruf | Winemaker | |
| 2003 | Vizontele Tuuba | Felek | |
| 2007 | Mutluluk | Münevver | |
| 2008 | Kars Hikayeleri | | |
| 2009 | Karanlıktakiler | Gülseren | |
| 2014 | Kadın İşi: Banka Soygunu | Anne | |
| 2017 | Ayla | Nimet | |
| 2019 | Mucize 2: Aşk | Hazar | |
| 2023 | Demir Kadın: Neslican | | |
| 2023 | Prestij Meselesi | Belkıs Aran | |
| 2025 | Tur Rehberi | Zeliha | |
| 2025 | Tete ve Masal: Rüyalar Diyari | Nene | |
| 2025 | Aşkın Dündü Çocuklari | Molekül Kıymet | |
| 2026 | Soy | | |
Television
| Year | Title | Role | Notes |
| 1986 | Sızı | | |
| 1988 | Keşanlı Ali Destanı | | |
| 1989 | Kaldırım Serçesi | | |
| 1989–2002 | Bizimkiler | Ayla Hanım | |
| 1993 | Yazlıkçılar | Yaprak | |
| 2002 | Gülbeyaz | Beyaz Ana | |
| 2004 | Şeytan Ayrıntıda Gizlidir | Beti | |
| 2006–2008 | Binbir Gece | Feride Aksal | |
| 2010–2013 | Öyle Bir Geçer Zaman ki | Hasefe Akarsu | |
| 2015 | Muhteşem Yüzyıl: Kösem | Büyücü İfrid | |
| 2017 | Anne | Anne Zeynep | |
| 2018 | İstanbullu Gelin | Ülfet | |
| 2019–2020 | Çukur | Makbule Kent | |
| 2021–2022 | Aziz | Hatice Ana | |
| 2022 | Darmaduman | Ayla | |
| 2025 | Başka Bir Gün | Can's Grandma | |
Web
| Year | Title | Role | Notes |
| 2019–2021 | Atiye | Zühre Altın | |
| 2021 | İlginç Bazı Olaylar | Narin Büyükak | |
| 2025 | Zamanin Kapilari | Esma | |
| 2026 | Gassal | Hatice | |
