= Vavien =

2009 Turkish comedy film

- Directed by: The Taylan Brothers
- Starring: Engin Günaydın; Binnur Kaya
- Music by: Attila Özdemiroğlu
- Release date: 18 December 2009
- Running time: 1h 40min
- Country: Turkey
- Language: Turkish

Vavien is a 2009 Turkish comedy film directed by the Taylan Brothers.

== Cast and characters ==
- Engin Günaydın as Celal
- Binnur Kaya as Sevilay
- Settar Tanrıöğen as Cemal
- Serra Yılmaz as Vekil
- Binnaz Ekren as Hanife
- İlker Aksum as Sabri
- Şinasi Yurtsever as Seyfi
