= Vatanım Sensin =

Turkish television series

- Genre: Period drama
- Directed by: Yağmur Taylan; Durul Taylan; Burak Arlıel
- Starring: Halit Ergenç; Bergüzar Korel; Onur Saylak; Celile Toyon; Miray Daner; Boran Kuzum; Pınar Deniz; Kubilay Aka
- Country of origin: Turkey
- Original language: Turkish
- No. of seasons: 2
- No. of episodes: 59

Production
- Executive producers: Yağmur Taylan; Durul Taylan; Onur Güvenatam
- Producer: Saner Ayar
- Production location: Turkey
- Cinematography: Burak Kanbir
- Editor: Emrullah Hekim
- Camera setup: Single-camera
- Running time: 120 minutes
- Production company: O3 Medya

Original release
- Network: Kanal D
- Release: October 27, 2016 – June 7, 2018

Vatanım Sensin (lit. 'You are my homeland', alternatively known as Wounded Love in English) is a Turkish television drama set during the last years of the Ottoman Empire and the Turkish War of Independence. The main character "Cevdet" is based on the life of Mustafa Mümin Aksoy, whose nickname was "Gavur Mümin". The first episode aired on October 26, 2016, on Kanal D. It stars Halit Ergenç and Bergüzar Korel.

The series begins with the Balkan Wars, after World War One and the death of Hasan Tahsin, who was the first to open fire on the Greek soldiers that landed at Izmir on May 15, 1919. The first season finished with the foundation of the Grand National Assembly of Turkey on April 23, 1920.

The second season begins with the Treaty of Sèvres on August 10, 1920. The series finished with Liberation of İzmir by Turkish army on September 9, 1922.

== Plot ==
Cevdet was a major based in Thessaloniki who served the Ottoman Army towards the end of the Balkan Wars. He was a patriotic soldier to his country, a passionate lover to his wife Azize, a compassionate father to his children, Ali Kemal, Yıldız and Hilal, and a good son to his mother, Hasibe Hanım. While fighting in the army to keep the homeland, Cevdet was betrayed and left for dead. His close friend Miralay Tevfik helped Cevdet's family in escaping Thessaloniki and immigrating to Izmir.

Seven years later, Cevdet reappears as a Colonel in the Greek Army, as the Greeks land at Izmir. Unknown to his family, he is a double agent working for Mustafa Kemal and the rebellion. Azize struggles to protect her family and work through her complicated feelings for her husband, while working as the Head Nurse at the hospital. Ali Kemal discovers he is adopted and wonders about his place within his family. Beautiful Yıldız has high aspirations for herself, accepting the Greek presence and her father's return the best. Hilal, the stubborn and patriotic youngest, takes part in revolutionary action. Miralay Tevfik, now the head of the Turkish Army in Izmir, aspires for Azize's love.

== Cast ==
Cevdet's Family

- Halit Ergenç as Cevdet

A colonel in the Ottoman army during the Balkan war, he was betrayed and left for dead by his best friend. He reappears seven years later in Izmir as a Colonel in the Greek Army. However, unbeknownst to everyone else, he is a double agent working for the Turks.

- Bergüzar Korel as Azize

Cevdet's wife who is deeply devoted to her family and works as the Head Nurse at the hospital. She is revolted by her husband's apparent change of alliance and increasingly partakes in more and more patriotic actions.

- Miray Daner as Hilal

Cevdet and Azize's youngest daughter who is stubborn and patriotic, working as a nurse with her mother. She runs a clandestine press with her friends, where she writes under the pseudonym Halit Iqbal, in order to revolt against Greek occupation. She eventually develops feelings for Leon which leaves her very conflicted as he is a soldier in the Greek army.

- Pınar Deniz as Yıldız

Cevdet and Azize's eldest daughter. Unlike her family, she is not really patriotic and tries to adapt to the Greek occupation. She is the only one who welcomes Cevdet warmly despite his treason. She soon takes an interest in Leon and hopes to marry him.

- Celile Toyon Uysal as Hasibe

Cevdet's mother. Although very happy that her son is alive, she cannot forgive him for joining the Greeks. She loves her family and is particularly fond of her daughter-in-law Azize.

- Kubilay Aka as Ali Kemal (season 1)

Cevdet and Azize's son. He accidentally learned on the day that his family fled Selanik that he was adopted. He never really recovered from this information, especially since, with Cevdet seemingly dead, there was no way for him to know where he really came from. He is secretly in love with Yıldız, which he tries to conceal as she is his adoptive sister.

Greek soldiers and their families

- Boran Kuzum as Leonidas "Leon" Papadopoulos

He is a Lieutenant in the Greek army and the son of its Commandant, Vasili. At first he is an obedient soldier, but as he is a compassionate and sensitive person, he begins to have doubts about his duty. When first arriving in Izmir he meets Yıldız and takes an interest in her, but he soon falls in love with her sister Hilal. He loves literature and poetry.

- Baki Davrak as General Vasili Papadopoulos (season 1)

He is the leader of the Greek army in Izmir. He is the one who turned Cevdet to the Greek side and he trusts him completely. His relationship with his wife Veronica is strained as she blames him for the loss of their eldest son twenty years prior. Although he loves Leon he has trouble showing it and treats him more as a soldier than a son.

- Senan Kara as Veronica (season 1)

Vasili's wife and Leon's mother, she still suffers from the loss of her eldest son twenty years prior. She initially has a lot of disdain for Turks, but eventually learns to respect Hasibe and Azize. She is more compassionate than her husband and is often worried for Leon's safety.

- Levent Can as General Filipos (season 2)

He is Veronica's brother and Leon's uncle. He also has a son Aleksi. He replaces Vasili as the head of the Greek army in Izmir. He is cruel and ruthless. His dream is to conquer all of Asia Minor, and especially Ankara.

- Berker Güven as Aleksi (season 2)

He is Filipos' son and Leon's cousin. He comes to Izmir when Leon comes back. He is always trying to get his father's approval and is always seen scheming for his own interests. He doesn't trust Leon and is attracted to Yıldız.

- Tugrul Tülek as Colonel Stavros (season 1)

He is a soldier who specializes in torture. He comes to Izmir for an investigation and stays there afterwards. He is very suspicious of Cevdet and tries to prove he is a traitor.

- Cihan Çulfa as Dimitri (season 1)

He is a Greek soldier waiting at Cevdet's door. He is responsible for fulfilling Cevdet's orders.

- Emrah Ersoy as Andreas (season 1)

An injured soldier who Hilal takes care of. He agrees to help her by testifying to a journalist about the atrocities committed by some Greek soldiers before trying to flee Izmir.

- Çağrı Çıtanak as Spiros (season 2)

He is a young soldier who is traumatized by the horrors of war. Cevdet takes him in his service to work on code decryptions.

- Ozan Ayhan as Captain Yanni (season 2)

A violent soldier working for Filipos.

- Serdar Yeğin as Colonel Adonis (season 2)

Filipos' former aide, he hates Turks and has Filipos' full trust.

Turkish resistance

- Fatih Artman as Captain Yakup

A captain for Mustafa Kemal's government in Ankara who works as Cevdet's partner in Izmir. He is a master of disguise and can go almost anywhere without being recognized. He forms a very close relationship with Cevdet and is very reliable.

- Hakan Salınmış as Eşref Pasha (season 1)

He is one of the leaders in the Anatolian resistance movement. He is the one who tasked Cevdet to infiltrate the Greek army and the only one to know his real duty.

- Genco Özak as Mehmet

He is the brother of Hasan Tahsin. He has sworn to continue his brother's cause and joins Hilal and her friends, although he is more in favour of violent action than they are.

- Erman Bacak as Cezmi

A Turk of Albanian origins, he is a musician who works in Haci's tavern. He is also one of Hilal's friends who run the clandestine press.

- Ahmet Ugur Say as Lütfü

Another one of Hilal's friends. He doesn't like violent actions and is often considered more fearful than the others.

- Ali Hikmet Kürekçi as Osman

Another of Hilal's musician and revolutionary friends.

- Ahmet Saraçoğlu as Ismet Pasha (season 2)

He is the Commander of the Western Front of the Turkish Army. He conveys the orders of Mustafa Kemal Pasha to Cevdet.

- Ufuk Bayraktar as Dağıstanlı (season 2)

He is a powerful efe around Izmir and opposes the Greeks in the mountains. He is considered a patriot on the same level as Mustafa Kemal and a possible leader for the Turkish nation, but his arrogance often gets in the way of his contribution. He suffers from an illness for which Azize treats him, which earns her his trust.

- Devrim Özkan as Havva (season 2)

A Turkish prisoner that Filipos selects to work as a maid in his mansion. Yakup later recruts her to work for the resistance.

- Tolga Coskun as Haydar (season 1)

He is a musician and one of Hilal's friends who run the clandestine press with her.

- Yiğit Çelebi as Chief Physician Mustafa Sami (season 1)

He is the chief physician at the hospital where Azize and her daughters work. He is also Eşref Pasha's nephew.

- Arda Kaptanlar as Yavuz (season 1)

He is Eşref's right hand man.

- Şükran Ovalı as Seher (season 2)

She is a woman warrior who lives on Dağıstanlı's farm. She is very loyal to him but doesn't trust Azize. She and her younger brother were entrusted to Dağıstanlı when their father died.

- Merve Dizdar as Efsun (season 2)

A woman that Azize meets in the mountain. Azize saves her from Greek soldiers and they form a close friendship. She suffers from an illness of the lungs.

- Esra Rusan as Emine (season 2)

A woman on Dağıstanlı's farm who becomes Azize and Efsun's friend.

- Can Kahraman as Pehlivan (season 2)

Dağıstanlı's closest advisor.

- Şafak Başkaya as Mestan Efe (season 2)

One of the efes who join Dağıstanlı in hopes of defeating the Greeks. He is the most impulsive one.

- Mehmet Polat as Sofu Efe (season 2)

Another one of the efes who is quite religious.

- Gökhan Bekletenler as Demirci Efe (season 2)

The third efe who joins Dağıstanlı.

- Ahmet Rifat Sungar as Vecihi (season 2)

A Turkish man who finds refuge from Greeks in Yakup's tavern. He is an engineer and a nationalist. His dream is to fly a plane.

- Mustafa Elikoğlu as Kerim (season 2)

He is Seher's younger brother and tries to prove himself to Dağıstanlı.

- Esme Madra as Zehra (season 2)

A woman that Azize encounters in a village near Izmir. She is terrified of Greek soldiers.

- Ahmet Tansu Taşanlar as Hasan Tahsin (season 1)

The leader of Hilal's band of resistants, he fires on the Greeks when they first land in Izmir.

- Deniz Ayaz as distributor boy

He is the child who distributes the Amasya Circular and Halit Iqbal's writings.

Others

- Onur Saylak as Tevfik

He is an Ottoman soldier and was Cevdet's best friend but he betrayed him. He fled Selanik with Cevdet's family and settled in Izmir where he and his soldiers have to cooperate with the Greek army. He has a relationship with Eftalya but is secretly in love with Azize.

- Okan Yalabık as William Charles Hamilton

He is a British envoy sent to Izmir to report on the occupation and on how the Greeks treat the Turks. But he has ulterior motives and manipulates events to further his own goals.

- Şebnem Hassanisoughi as Eftalya (season 1)

She is a singer who works in Haci's tavern. She is a relationship with Tevfik who she loves but she gets entangled in his schemes.

- Can Kolukısa as Hristo (season 1)

He is Eftelya's father and works for Tevfik on a secret project for fear for his daughter's life. He is mentally ill and sometimes acts irrationally.

- Saadet Aksoy as Lucy Adams (season 1)

She is British and is the sister of Charles Hamilton's dead wife. She is sick but is always willing to help others.

- Mert Denizmen as Yinon Steiner (season 1)

A money lander in Izmir who collaborates with Tevfik.

- Murat Mastan as İhsan (season 1)

He is an Ottoman soldier and Tevfik's aide.

- Emre Şen as Hacimihalis (season 1)

He is a Greek citizen of Izmir. He owns a tavern where Ali Kemal spends a lot of time and where Eftalya and the musicians work. He and his family are neighbours and friends of Azize's family.

- Yasemin Szawlowski as Eleni (season 1)

She is Haci's daughter, the neighbour of Azize and Yıldız best friend. She works in the boutique where Yıldz first meets Leon. She also has feelings for Ali Kemal.

- Aslı Omağ as Marika (season 1)

Haci's wife and Eleni's mother. She is a good friend of Azize and her family.

The series has featured many historical figures of the time, including Mustafa Kemal, Halide Edib, Black Fatima, and Princess Anatasia of Russia.

== Production ==
=== Filming ===
Filming began in August 2016 on location in Istanbul, Izmir and the Aegean Region. Additionally, a set was built in Istanbul to recreate the coastal promenade of Izmir and the neighborhoods of the time. The filming of the first chapter lasted between 35 and 40 days.

== International broadcasts ==
- (Arab League) Arab World - The series was premiered in 2017 and broadcast on MBC4, MBC+ Variety, MBC Action and SHAHID Streaming Platform under the title "أنت وطني" (You Are My Homeland)
- Romania - The series premiered on Kanal D on September 13, 2017, under the title Patria mea ești tu!
- Bosnia and Herzegovina - The series premiered on Pink BH in 2017 and on Federalna TV in 2020 as Ti si moja domovina
- North Macedonia - The series premiered on Sitel in November 2018 under the title Далеку од Дома (Daleku od doma; Far away from home)
- Bangladesh - The series premiered on Deepto TV in December 2019 under the title জননী জন্মভূমি (Jononi jonmobhumi; Mother-motherland)
- Albania - The series premiered on Kanal D Drama in July 2020 under the title Dashuri e plagosur (Wounded love)
- Pakistan - The series is set to release on Dot Republic Media Network on YouTube in Urdu language and GEO KAHANI channel with the title آتش عشق (Fire of Love)
- Indonesia - The series premiered on ANTV in December 2020 under the title Cinta Azize
