= Yeşim Ustaoğlu =

Turkish filmmaker and screenwriter (born 1960)

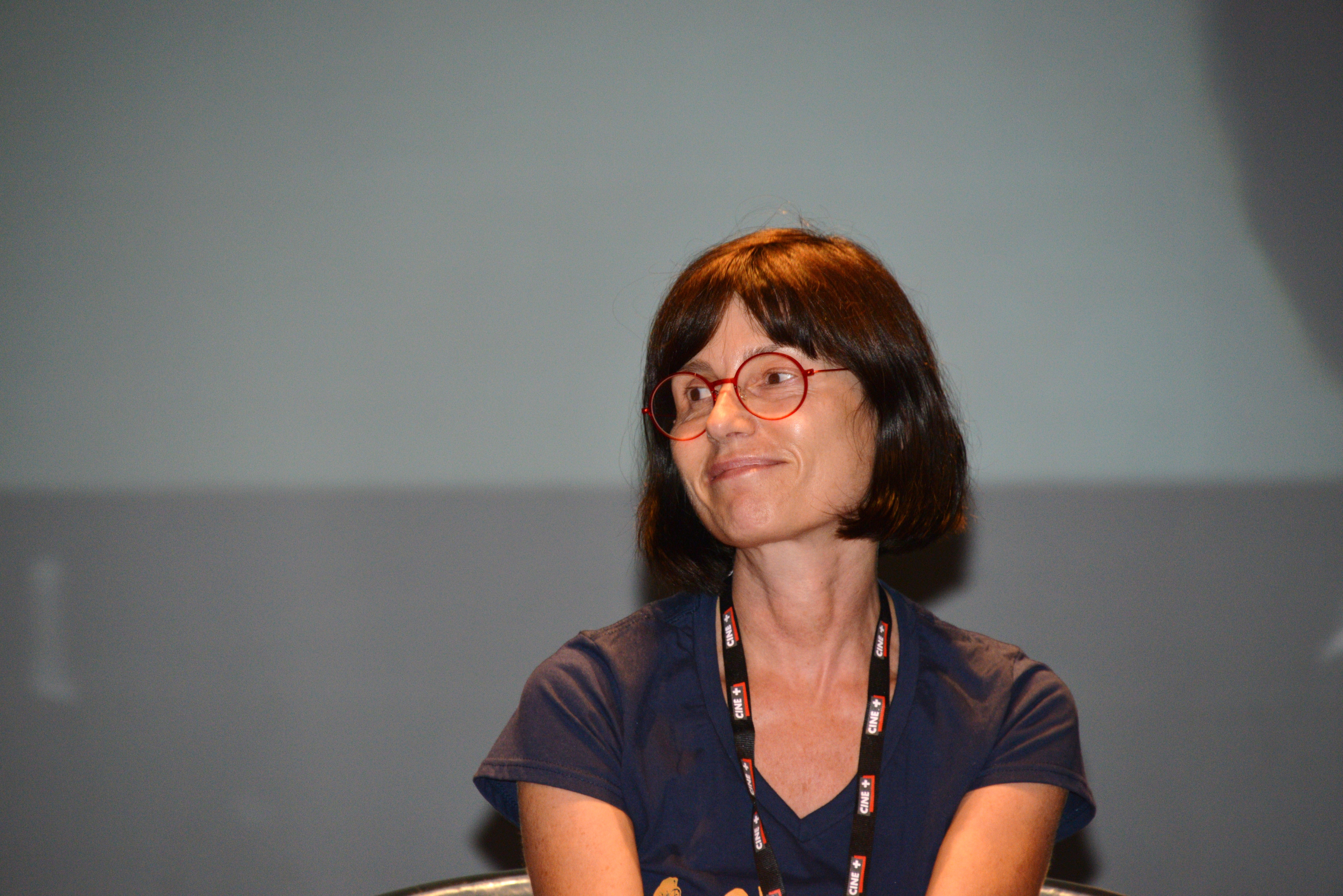
- Born: 18 November 1960 (age 65); Çaykara, Turkey
- Occupations: Film director, screenwriter
- Years active: 1984–present

Yeşim Ustaoğlu (born 18 November 1960) is a Turkish filmmaker and screenwriter.

== Life and career ==
Ustaoğlu was born in Kars, Sarıkamış and grew up in Trabzon on the Black Sea. After studying architecture at Karadeniz Technical University she moved to Istanbul, attended master's programme in Yıldız Technical University, she worked as an architect, then as a journalist and a film critic. Before she made her feature film debut The Trace (İz) in 1994, she had made several award-winning short films. The Trace was entered into the 19th Moscow International Film Festival.

Ustaoğlu received international recognition for her next film, Journey to the Sun (Güneşe Yolculuk), which told a story of a friendship between a Turk and a Kurd. Her fourth film Pandora's Box (Pandora'nın Kutusu) won The Best Film and The Best Actress award in San Sebastian Film Festival and is Ustaoğlu's biggest international success to date.

== Filmography ==
Year	English Title	Original Title	Notes
1984	To Catch a Moment	Bir Anı Yakalamak	short film
1989	Magnafantagna	Magnafantagna	short film
1990	Duet	Düet	short film
1992	Hotel	Otel	short film
1994	The Trace	Iz	feature film debut
1999	Journey to the Sun	Güneşe Yolculuk	Won the Blue Angel Award at Berlin
2003	Waiting for the Clouds	Bulutları Beklerken	
2004	Life on Their Shoulders	Sırtlarındaki Hayat	documentary short film
2008	Pandora's Box	Pandora'nın Kutusu	Won the Golden Shell Award at San Sebastian International Film Festival
2012	Araf - Somewhere in Between	Araf	
2016	Clair Obscur	Tereddüt	Several awards including best picture at the 53rd Antalya International Film Festival
2026	What Remains	Artakalan	
