= The Taylan Brothers =

Turkish film directors

Yağmur Taylan (1966) and Durul Taylan (1969), also known as The Taylan Brothers are Turkish film directors.

== Biography ==
Having studied Industrial Engineering and Medicine respectively, the brothers started their work behind the camera with their first Television project Sir Dosyası. After directing several other television series such as Cinler ve Periler, Baba and the hit comedy show Beşik Kertmesi, they made their first motion picture, Okul. The horror-comedy film was a critical and financial hit. Praised by Turkish critics as an ambitious debut, Okul grossed $3,255,287 domestically.

They worked on other television projects such as Alacakaranlık, a police drama, and the comedy series Yabancı Damat (The Foreign Groom) filmed in Greece and Turkey. The series was a hit in Turkey and other countries such as Greece, Bulgaria and Arabia and lasted 106 episodes. Yabanci Damat was nominated in 6 categories in the 1st Annual Primetime Beyaz Inci Awards and won in 3 categories including Best Music, Best Director and Best Supporting Actress.

In 2006 they released their second motion picture Küçük Kıyamet ( The Little Apocalypse), a psychological horror film. Küçük Kıyamet won awards, including Best Editing at the 18th Ankara Film Festival, Best Actress at the twelfth Sadri Alışık Awards and Best Supporting Actor at the twenty-eighth Turkish Film Critics Association (SİYAD) Awards.

They next produced the television series Karayılan, a drama about the eastern front of the Turkish Independence War.

Their third motion picture was Vavien (Two-way Switch). Vavien was a critical hit, winning the Best Picture and FIPRESCI award in the twenty-ninth International Istanbul Film Festival and also earning 11 nominations and 5 awards at the Turkish Film Critics Association (SİYAD) Awards.

The brothers filmed Muhteşem Yüzyıl, a Turkish prime-time historical soap opera for Turkey's Show TV network. It is based on the life of Sultan Süleyman I (also known as Suleiman the Magnificent), the longest reigning Sultan of the Ottoman Empire, and Hürrem Sultan, the slave girl who became his queen.

== Motion Pictures ==
- Azizler
- Vavien
- Küçük Kıyamet
- Okul

== Television series ==
- Vatanım Sensin
- Gecenin Kraliçesi
- Muhteşem Yüzyıl
- Kara Yılan
- Yabancı Damat
- Alacakaranlık
- Baba
- Sır Dosyası
- Cinler ve Periler
- Beşik Kertmesi
