= Hasibe Eren =

Turkish actress (born 1975)

- Born: Hasibe Özlem Eren; 6 June 1975 (age 51); Germany
- Occupation: Actress
- Years active: 1997–present

Hasibe Özlem Eren (born 6 June 1975) is a Turkish actress. She starred in the Show TV animated series Sıdıka in 1997. Eren played the role of Makbule on the show Avrupa Yakası.

== Life and career ==
Hasibe Eren graduated from Istanbul University, Department of Market Research and Advertising. Later, she graduated from the School of Letters, Department of Theater Criticism and Dramaturgy. In 2010, she graduated from Bahçeşehir University Advanced Acting Master's Program.

Eren first rose to prominence with her role as a voice actress in the 1997 Show TV animated series Sıdıka. Since 1996, she has been working at the children's education unit of the Istanbul City Theatres.

She was later cast in the movie Anlat İstanbul, appearing in the segment inspired by the story of Cinderella. She also served as an acting coach for Ece Hakim and Azra Akın in the same movie, and later coached Ege Tanman for her role in Babam ve Oğlum. Between 2006 and 2008, she was a regular on hit sitcom Avrupa Yakası, portraying the role of Makbule.

She started her career as a TV presenter by presenting the Bir Zamanlar Türkiye program on 24 in 2008. Between 2010 and 2011, she played the role of Gülizar on the TRT 1 comedy series Yerden Yüksek. From 2011 to 2014, she was a regular on the Kanal D hit sitcom series Yalan Dünya, portraying the character Gülistan. In 2016, she appeared as Emel on the ATV series Aile İşi, which ended in May 2016.

Since 2022, she has played numerous roles in the sketch comedy "Güldür Güldür Show", which airs on Show TV.

== Theatre ==
- Arzunun Onda Dokuzu
- Yaşar Ne Yaşar Ne Yaşamaz (play)|Yaşar Ne Yaşar Ne Yaşamaz
- Rumuz Goncagül
- Yeditepeli Aşk

== Filmography ==
#	Name	Character	Year(s)
1	Güldür Güldür Show	Nazlı	2022-2025
2	Hakim	Gülbahar Yalçın	2022
3	Hazine		2022
4	Sen Ben Lenin	Meryem	2021
5	Jet Sosyete	Pelin Soner; Şennur Yılmaz; Gülnur Kühn	2018-2020
6	Türk Malı	Bakiye Çekirdek	2017
7	Aile İşi	Emel	2016
8	Kara Bela	Kudret'in karısı	2015
9	Pazarları Hiç Sevmem	Reyhan	2012
10	Yalan Dünya	Gülistan	2011-2014
11	Yerden Yüksek	Gülizar	2010
12	Adab-ı Muaşeret		2009
13	Kıskanmak		2009
14	Usta	Hilal	2008
15	Avrupa Yakası	Makbule Kıral	2006-2009
16	Anlat İstanbul		2005
17	Yağmur Zamanı	Turna	2004
18	Oyuncak Fabrikası		2003
19	Aşk Meydan Savaşı	İclal	2002
20	Canım Kocacığım		2002
21	Kibar Ana		2002
22	Şaşı Felek Çıkmazı	Nurşim	2000
23	Sıdıka	Sıdıka Saka	1997

== Awards ==
- 2007: 34th Golden Butterfly Awards - Best Comedy Actress
