= İlker Aksum =

Turkish actor (born 1971)

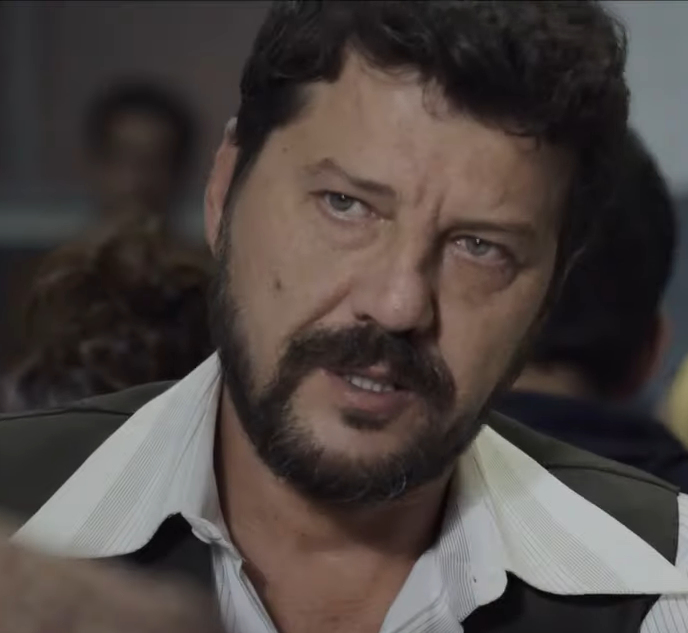
- Born: İbrahim İlker Aksum; 23 May 1971 (age 55); Isparta, Turkey
- Occupation: Actor
- Years active: 1999–present
- Spouses: Belgin Erdoğan (m. 2008; div. 2012) Dilay Ekmekçioğlu (m. 2023)
- Children: 1

İbrahim İlker Aksum (born 23 May 1971) is a Turkish actor.

== Life and career ==
He has appeared in more than twenty popular series and films since 1999. His breakthrough roles are in popular series Yabancı Damat, Canım Ailem, Çarli, Olacak O Kadar, and Karayılan. He starred alongside Tuba Büyüküstün in 20 Dakika which has a nomination for the 42nd International Emmy Award for Best Actress.

== Filmography ==
=== Series ===
- Altı Üstü İstanbul - (2026) - Bayram Cankaya
- Çarpıntı - (2025) - Halit
- Eşref Rüya - (2025) - Kabzımal
- Siyah Kalp - (2024–2025)
- Yeşil Deniz: Milenyum - (2024)
- Teşkilat - (2024) - Kambur
- Mevlânâ Celâleddîn-i Rûmî - (2023–2025) - Selahattin Zerkubi)
- Şahsiyet - (2023–2024)
- Başım Belada - (2023)
- Kaderimin Oyunu - (2021)
- Eşkıya Dünyaya Hükümdar Olmaz - (2021)
- Ramo: (2020–2021) (Hasan)
- Diriliş Ertuğrul (2018) - Dragos
- Mehmetçik Kut'ül Amare (2018) - Cox
- Poyraz Karayel (2016–2017) - Çınar Sayguner
- Seddülbahir 32 Saat: Yasin Uslu - (2016) - Ramiz
- Yeşil Deniz - (2015–2016)
- Ne Diyosuun (Ali Kemal) Başrol oyuncusu - (2014)
- Tatar Ramazan: Cevdet Mercan - (2013)
- 20 Dakika: Ali Bilgin - (2013) - Ali Halaskar
- Kötü Yol: Nisan Akman - (2012) - Reşat
- Bizim Yenge: Aydın Bulut - (2011) - Bahri
- Sen de Gitme: Türkan Derya - (2011) - Doktor Yahya Turan
- Muhteşem Yüzyıl: Taylan Biraderler - (2011) - Kaptan-ı Derya Cafer Ağa (Konuk Oyuncu)
- Canım Ailem: Türkan Derya - (2008–2010) - Halim
- Karayılan: Taylan Biraderler - (2007) - Yüzbaşı Laroş
- Yabancı Damat: Taylan Biraderler - (2004–2007) - Ruşen Demir
- Aşk Olsun: Yasemin Türkmenli - (2003) - Yıldırım
- Çarli İş Başında: Taylan Biraderler - (2000) - Afakan
- Çarli: Taylan Biraderler - (1998) - Afakan
- Olacak O Kadar : Levent Kırca - (1997) - İlker

=== Films ===
- Mutluyuz Mu? - (2026) - Aytaç
- Mitoloji Mafyası - (2026) - Mono Rıza
- Gülizar Yol Ayrımı - (2025) - Cevdet
- Kadıköy Boğası - (2025)
- Sonradan Gurme - (2025) - Mehmet Usta
- Karantina - (2025) - Ender Zorlu)
- Gecenin Nakaratı - (2024)
- Çocuk Kalbi - (2024) - Erdem
- Sadık Ahmet - (2024) - İsmail Rodoplu
- Nefes: Yer Eksi İki - (2023) - Journalist Ufuk
- Oyun Bitti - (2023)
- Demir Kadın: Neslican - (2023)
- Yangın Günleri: Independenta - (2023)
- Nefes: Yer Eksi İki - (2023) - Ufuk
- Demir Kadın: Neslican - (2023)
- Müjdemi İsterim - (2022)
- Azizler - (2021)
- 7. Koğuştaki Mucize - (2019) - Askorozlu
- Hedefim Sensin - (2018) - Yarım Hasan
- Her Şey Seninle Güzel - (2018)
- Buyur Bi'De Burdan Bak - (2016, 2018)
- Aşk Olsun (Başrol oyuncusu) - (2015)
- Kadim Dostum (Başrol oyuncusu) - (2014)
- Mutlu Aile Defteri: Nihat Durak - (2013) - Kudret Taşyumruk
- Bizim Büyük Çaresizliğimiz: Seyfi Teoman - (2011) - Ender
- Vavien: Taylan Biraderler - (2009) - Televizyoncu Sabri
- Ejder Kapanı: Uğur Yücel - (2009) - Doktor
- Güz Sancısı: Tomris Giritlioğlu - (2008) - İsmet
- Küçük Kıyamet: Taylan Biraderler - (2006) - Ali
- Beşik Kertmesi: Taylan Biraderler - (2002) - Enis Büyütücü
- Biz Size Aşık Olduk: Türkan Derya - (2002) - Sinan
- Baykuşların Saltanatı: Tülay Eratalay - (2000)
- 5 Maymun Çetesi: Taylan Biraderler - (1999) - Amerikan
