= Güldür Güldür Show =

- Genre: Comedy
- Written by: Eray Akyamaner; Sıla Çetindağ; Uğur Güvercin
- Story by: Murat Kepez
- Directed by: Meltem Bozoflu
- Presented by: Ali Sunal
- Starring: Açelya Topaloğlu; Ali Sunal; Aylin Kontente; Aziz Aslan; Berkay Tulumbacı; Burak Topaloğlu; Demet Taşkıran; Doğa Rutkay; Ecem Erkek; Erdem Yener; Helin Elif Balci; Mahir İpek; Meltem Yılmazkaya; Onur Buldu; Özgün Aydın; Özgün Bayraktar; Sergen Özdemir; Toygan Avanoğlu; Uğur Bilgin
- Theme music composer: Ramiz Bayraktar
- Country of origin: Turkey
- Original language: Turkish
- No. of seasons: 14
- No. of episodes: 448

Original release
- Release: October 1, 2013 – present

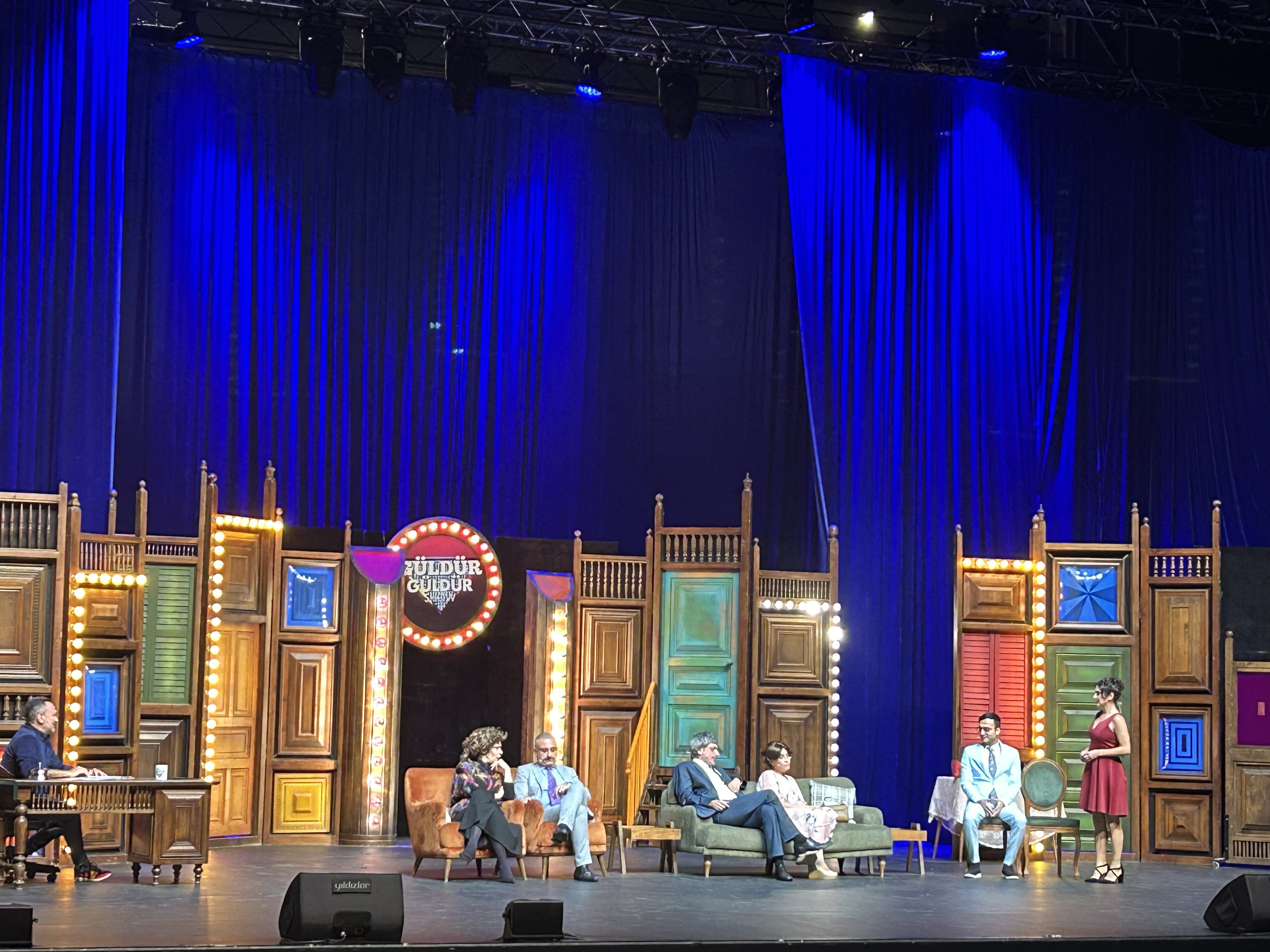
A scene from Güldür Güldür Show

Güldür Güldür Show is a Turkish sketch comedy television series produced by Beşiktaş Kültür Merkezi (BKM) and hosted by Ali Sunal, the son of Turkish actor and comedian Kemal Sunal. The programme's first 13 episodes aired on FOX, before it moved to Show TV, where it has aired for 13 seasons.

The series features a cast of comedians performing sketches that explore various aspects of everyday life in Turkey, particularly in Istanbul. Its sketches frequently address family relationships, social interactions, cultural differences and contemporary social issues through humor and satire.

As of 17 October 2026, the program has 448 episodes consisting of 14 seasons.

== Episodes ==
Season	First aired	Last aired	Episodes	Channel
-	27 Feb 2013	12 Jun 2013	1-13	FOX
1	1 Oct 2013	10 Jul 2014	14-48	Show TV
2	11 Sep 2014	19 Jun 2015	49-79	Show TV
3	5 Oct 2015	24 Jun 2016	80-118	Show TV
4	28 Oct 2016	16 Jun 2017	119-152	Show TV
5	11 Oct 2017	12 Jun 2018	153-186	Show TV
6	16 Feb 2019	13 Jul 2019	187-208	Show TV
7	4 Oct 2019	17 Jul 2020	209-240	Show TV
8	27 Oct 2020	2 Jul 2021	241-274	Show TV
9	2 Oct 2021	25 Jun 2022	275-312	Show TV
10	22 Oct 2022	29 Jul 2023	313-345	Show TV
11	14 Oct 2023	15 Jun 2024	346-379	Show TV
12	19 Oct 2024	29 Jun 2025	380-413	Show TV
13	19 Oct 2025	18 Jul 2026	414-447	Show TV
14	17 Oct 2026		448-	Show TV

== Cast and crew ==
=== Active ===
As of 18 October 2026

#	Name	Character	From Episode	Total episodes	Season(s)
1	Açelya Topaloğlu	Çiçek	187-	262	6-
2	Ali Sunal	Aziz Güngör Esen; Presenter	1-	448	1-
3	Aylin Kontente	Burcu Yerler	1-186; 209-261; 275-448	413	1-5; 7-8; 9-
4	Aziz Aslan	Fikri Tarhanacı	1-	448	1-
5	Berkay Tulumbacı	Ozan	187-	262	6-
6	Burak Topaloğlu	Bahadır	1-	448	1-
7	Demet Taşkıran		448-	1	14-
8	Doğa Rutkay	Yeter	1-	448	1-
9	Ecem Erkek	Naime	171-274; 380-	173	5-8; 12-
10	Erdem Yener	Hüseyin	28-128; 313-	237	1-4; 10-
11	Helin Elif Balci	Ayşe	414-	35	13-
12	Mahir İpek	Hayati	141-	308	4-
13	Meltem Yılmazkaya	Mehtap	1-	448	1-
14	Nebi Tolga Yılmaz	Zeki	399-	50	12-
15	Onur Buldu	Bilal Koçyiğit	1-312; 380-	381	1-9; 12-
16	Özgün Aydın	Mustafa	3-229; 249-	427	1-
17	Özgün Bayraktar	Jale	284-	165	9-
18	Sergen Özdemir		448-	1	14-
19	Toygan Avanoğlu	Paşa	275-	174	9-
20	Uğur Bilgin	Mesut Tekyaprak	36-	413	1-

=== Casts left ===
#	Name	Character	Episodes	Total episodes	Seasons
1	Alper Kul	İsmail Canevinden	1-379; 400	380	1-11; 12
2	Asiye Dinçsoy	Reyhan	269-297; 312	38	10
3	Aslı İnandık	Gülşen	139-186	48	5-6
4	Aycan Koptur	Kiraz	187-208	22	7
5	Ayça Damgacı	Nimet	275-285	11	10
6	Ayça Koptur	Feride	346-379	34	11
7	Ayşegül Akdemir	Dilek	18-118	101	2-4
8	Çağlar Çorumlu	Şevket Mircan	1-152; 209-240; 400	185	1-5; 8; 12
9	Dağhan Külegeç	Tayfur	241-255	15	9
10	Deniz Hiracan	Zeyno	275-289	15	10
11	Derya Karadaş	Aysel	49-162	114	3-6
12	Dilşah Demir	Çiğdem	1-6	6	1
13	Emre Altuğ	Kazım	187-240; 309	55	7-8
14	Evrim Akın	Özge	187-235	120	7-8
15	Fatih Öztürk	Sadık	346-379	34	12
16	Giray Altınok	Feridun	226-345	120	8-11
17	Gözde Okur	Elmas	283-299; 311	17	10
18	Gürhan Altundaşar	Ercüment	313-345	33	11
19	Hamza Yazıcı	Taylan	160-171	12	6
20	Hasibe Eren	Nazlı	313-413	101	10-12
21	İrem Kahyaoğlu	Leman	209-345	137	8-11
22	Korhan Herduran	Samet	119-186	68	5-6
23	İrem Sak	Sinem	1-33; 50-186	170	1-2; 3-6
24	Kıvanç Baran Arslan	Hamza	80-152; 178-183	79	4-5; 6
25	Murat Akkoyunlu	Cemil	241-274	34	9
26	Nazmi Sinan Mıhçı	Dayı	346-379	34	12
27	Onur Atilla	İbrahim Çekiç	1-13	447	1-13
28	Ozan Akbaba	Şenol	1-5	5	1
29	Ozan Varol	Ufuk	275-289; 312	16	10
30	Özge Borak	Nezaket	18-118	101	2-4
31	Ömür Arpacı	Tufan	299-345	47	10-11
32	Sıla Çetindağ	Merve	1-5	5	1
33	Simge Günsan	Suzan	187-208	22	7
34	Sinan Çalışkanoğlu	Çetin	187-240	54	7-8
35	Tuğçe Karabayır	Şükran	153-186	34	6
36	Ünal Yeter	Kudret	153-345	193	6-11
37	Yavuzhan Doğan	Cem	1	1	1
38	Yeşim Ceren Bozoğlu	Oya	1-6	6	1

=== Guests ===
#	Name	Character	Episode(s)
1	Aleyna Tilki	Aleyna Tilki	323
2	Ahmet Özhan	Ahmet Özhan	300
3	Aslıhan Güner	Aslıhan	249
4	Aydın Uğurlular	Kuşum Aydın	312
5	Ayta Sözeri	Ayta	249
6	Aytaç Doğan	Aytaç Doğan	323
7	Burak Hakkı	Burak Hakkı	330
8	Deniz Baysal	Deniz Baysal	357
9	Devrim Özkan	Devrim Özkan	323
10	Dilek Çelebi	Perihan	258
11	Eda Özülkü	Eda Özülkü	357
12	Ege Kökenli	Ege Kökenli	330
13	Emel Sayın	Emel Sayın	288
14	Enver Ertaş	Enver Ertaş	357
15	Erdal Erzincan	Erdal Erzincan	288
16	Ferhat Göçer	Ferhat Göçer	304
17	Fettah Can	Fettah Can	305
18	Gülden Karaböcek	Gülden	249
19	Haluk Levent	Haluk Levent	307
20	Hami Mandıralı	Hami Mandıralı	288
21	Hande Katipoğlu	Hande Katipoğlu	304
22	Hayko Cepkin	Hayko; Kont Drakula	111; 400
23	İbrahim Büyükak	İbrahim	155, 225
24	İsmail Demirci	İsmail	249
25	İsmail Tunçbilek	İsmail Tunçbilek	323
26	İsmail YK	İsmail	131
27	Jale Bekar	Jale	357
28	Kobra Murat	Kobra Murat	288
29	Larissa Gacemer	Larissa	305
30	Levent Yüksel	Levent Yüksel	323
31	Metin Özülkü	Metin Özülkü	357
32	Murat Dalkılıç	Murat	313
33	Müjdat Gezen	Müjdat Gezen	372
34	Nazan Öncel	Nazan Öncel	357
35	Özgürcan Çevik	Özgürcan Çevik	304
36	Olcay Şahan	Olcay Şahan	288
37	Olgun Toker	Olgun	249
38	Oğuzhan Koç	Oğuzhan	155
39	Öykü Gürman	Öykü	30
40	Pelin Karahan	Pelin	182
41	Ramiz Bayraktar	Ramiz	281,323
42	Sadettin Teksoy	Sadettin Teksoy	323
43	Sagopa Kajmer	Sagopa Kajmer	323
44	Serkan Çağrı	Serkan	249
45	Seyyal Taner	Seyyal Taner	357
46	Sibel Alaş	Sibel Alaş	357
47	Tuncay Şanlı	Tuncay Şanlı	288
48	Tuvana Türkay	Tuvana	131
49	Ümit Karan	Ümit Karan	288
50	Yasemin Sakallıoğlu	Yasemin	310
51	Yasemin Yalçın	Sürahi Nine	357
52	Yeşim Salkım	Yeşim	249

== Awards ==
Awards
Year	Organization	Category
2015	42nd Golden Butterfly Awards	Best Comedy
2017	44th Golden Butterfly Awards	Best Comedy
2023	49th Golden Butterfly Awards	Best Comedy
