= Ali Sunal =

Turkish actor (born 1977)

- Born: 22 September 1977 (age 48); Istanbul, Turkey
- Occupation: Actor
- Years active: 1995–present
- Spouses: Gökçe Bahadır (m. 2011; div. 2012) Nazlı Kurbanzade (m. 2018)
- Children: 2
- Parent(s): Kemal Sunal; Gül Sunal

Ali Sunal (born 22 September 1977) is a Turkish actor and television presenter. He is the son of actor and comedian Kemal Sunal. He is best known for his role as Mahmut in the movie Propaganda with his father and Mustafa in the popular series En Son Babalar Duyar and Benim Annem Bir Melek, Yaprak Dökümü. He directs sketch theatre "Güldür Güldür Show" for long time. The child sketch series "Güldüy Güldüy" directed by his sister Ezo Sunal. Sunal studied communication at Yeditepe University, and then worked at Sadri Alışık Cultural Center and Dormen Theatre for a while. Meanwhile, he pursued a career in television and cinema. In 1999, he graduated from Istanbul University with a degree in communication studies. He then joined the crew of Theatre İstanbul. Since 2013, he has served as both the choreography director and actor in the comedy show Güldür Güldür. With his childhood friend and Rutkay Aziz's daughter Doğa Rutkay, he works in film "Hava Muhalefeti" and "Güldür Güldür".

== Filmography ==
Theatre in TV
Year	Title	Role	Notes
2007	Komedi Dükkanı	Himself	Guest appearance
2011	5'er Beşer	Aziz Güngör Esen	
2012	İnsanlar Alemi	Aziz	
2013–present	Güldür Güldür Show	Aziz	Presenter and actor
Film
Year	Title	Role	Notes
1995	Aşk Üzerine Söylenmemiş Herşey		
1999	Propaganda	Mahmut	Appeared alongside his father Kemal Sunal
2003	Okul	Alparslan Bey	
2006	Kısık Ateşte 15 Dakika	Erhan	
2007	Bayrampaşa: Ben Fazla Kalmayacağım	Civil police	Guest appearance
2008	Sıfır Noktası	Ozan	TV film
2011	Banka		
2014	Yusuf Yusuf	Dolmuş Şoförü	Leading role
2015	Hayat Öpücüğü	Metin	Leading role
2016	Dedemin Fişi	Rıfat Çirçi/Sırat Çirçi	Guest appearance
2019	Hareket Sekiz	Police officer	Leading role
2023	Hava Muhalefeti		Leading role
TV Series
Year	Title	Role	Notes
1997	Şaban ile Şirin		
2000	Fosforlu Cevriye	Sivil Polis	
2002–2003	En Son Babalar Duyar	Mustafa	
2004	Sayın Bakanım	Cömert	
2005	Kanlı Düğün	Orhan	
2007	Sana Mecburum	Berat	
2008-2009	Benim Annem Bir Melek	Çetin Turuncu	
2010	Yaprak Dökümü	Serhat	season 5
2011	Huzurum Kalmadı		
2013	Güzel Çirkin	Murat Komiser	Leading role
