= Aile Arasında =

2017 Turkish film by Ozan Açıktan

- Theatrical release poster
- Directed by: Ozan Açıktan
- Written by: Gülse Birsel
- Produced by: Necati Akpınar
- Starring: Engin Günaydın; Demet Evgar; Erdal Özyağcılar; Devrim Yakut; Fatih Artman; Şevket Çoruh; Gülse Birsel; Derya Karadaş; Su Kutlu; Ayta Sözeri
- Cinematography: Yon Thomas
- Edited by: Erkan Erdem
- Music by: Jingle Jungle
- Production company: BKM
- Distributed by: Mars Dağıtım
- Release dates: 28 November 2017 (Istanbul); 1 December 2017 (Turkey)
- Running time: 125 min
- Country: Turkey
- Language: Turkish
- Box office: ₺64,5 million

Aile Arasında (Between Family) is a Turkish comedy film directed by Ozan Açıktan and written by Gülse Birsel. It stars Engin Günaydın, Demet Evgar, Erdal Özyağcılar, Devrim Yakut, Fatih Artman, Şevket Çoruh, Gülse Birsel, Derya Karadaş, Su Kutlu and Ayta Sözeri. It was released on 1 December 2017. It was later remade into Hindi as Son of Sardaar 2 (2025).

== Plot ==
Singer Solmaz and shopkeeper Fikret ("Fiko") have both just gotten out of 21-year relationships. Solmaz's has been dumped by her boyfriend (and the father of her daughter) and Fiko by his wife, who kicks him out. The two meet and Solmaz tells Fiko he can stay at her house until he gets back on his feet. At the same time, Solmaz's daughter Zeynep, a college student, gets engaged to her boyfriend Emirhan, but doesn't want his traditional, conservative family to find out her parents are unmarried and her father is gone. Solmaz convinces Fiko to pretend to be Zeynep's father and a police chief during the wedding. Fiko refuses at first because he's a terrible liar but eventually gives in. The wedding, originally supposed to be short and private affair, turns in a multi-day extravaganza thanks to the groom's family. Antics ensue.

== Cast ==
- Engin Günaydın - Fikret "Fiko"
- Demet Evgar - Solmaz
- Erdal Özyağcılar - Haşmet Kurt
- Devrim Yakut - Mükerrem Kurt
- Fatih Artman - Emirhan Kurt
- Şevket Çoruh - Necati "Neco" Balcılar
- Gülse Birsel - Mihriban
- Derya Karadaş - Leyla
- Su Kutlu - Zeynep Balcılar
- Ayta Sözeri - Behiye
- Devin Özgür Çınar - Gülümser Kurt
- Deniz Hamzaoğlu - Kahraman Kurt
- Rıza Akın - Muharrem Aladağ
- Arif Erkin - Dede
- Erdal Cindoruk - Ruhi
- Ünal Yeter - Okan

== Production ==
=== Development ===
The screenplay writer, Gülse Birsel, later said that she had developed the scenario over the course of 3–4 months.

=== Filming ===
Aile Arasında's filming began on 26 August 2017. Istanbul shootings were carried out in a set in Silivri. Part of the shootings continued in Adana. The film was completed in seven weeks.

== Release ==
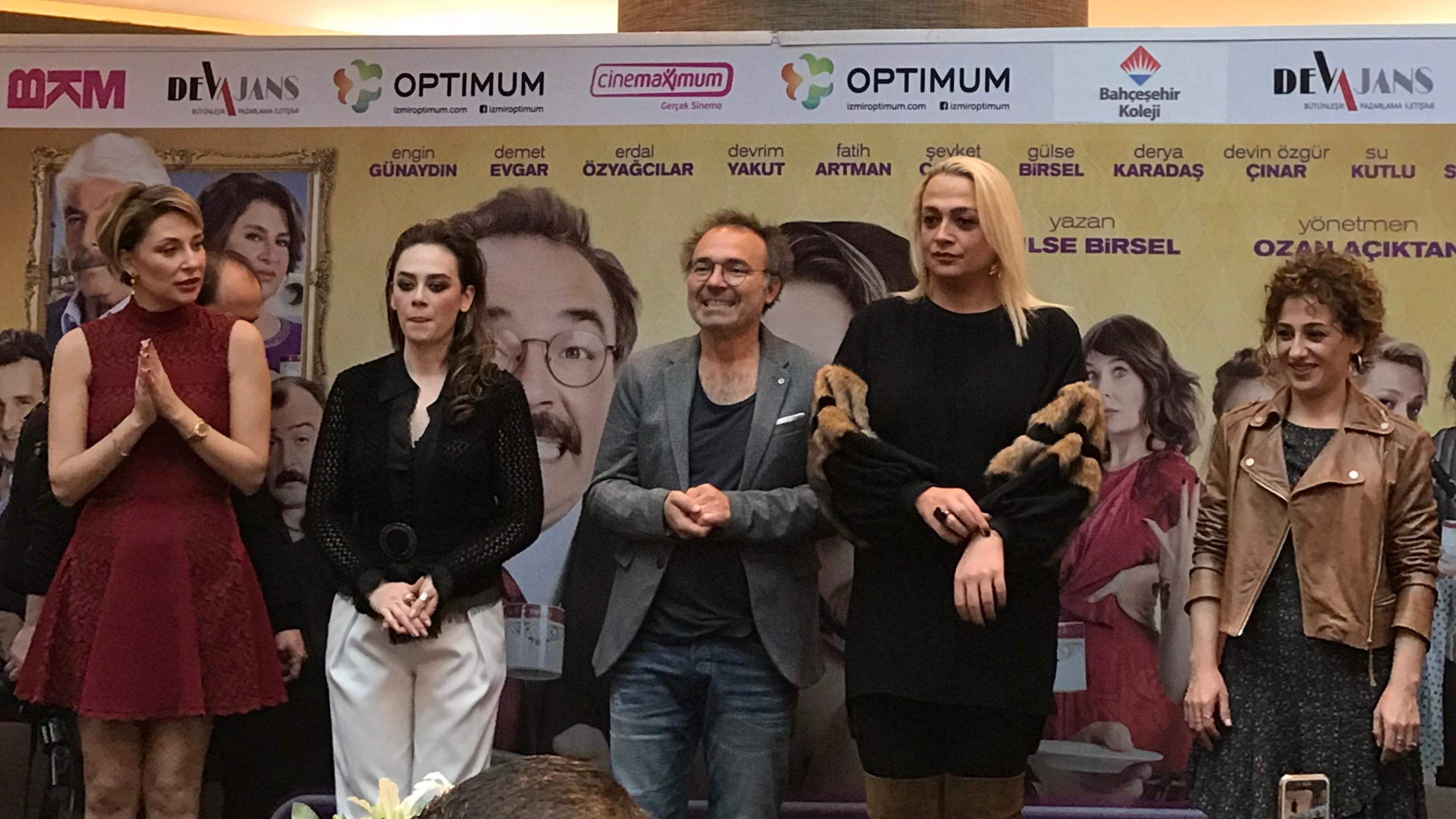
From left to right: Gülse Birsel, Demet Evgar, Engin Günaydın, Ayta Sözeri and Derya Karadaş, at the film's premiere in İzmir.

Aile Arasında's premiere was held on 28 November 2017 at Kanyon Shopping Mall in Istanbul. On 30 November 2017, a premiere ceremony was held in Adana's M1 Mall. The movie was released on 1 December 2017. On the same day, the cast appeared on Beyaz Show. On 2 December 2017, another ceremony for the movie was held at İzmir Optimum. The last promotional ceremony was organized on 4 December 2017 in Ankara at Panora Mall. Shown in seven hundred and fifty theaters throughout the country, the film was watched by 504,024 people in the first three days and had the fourth best opening of the year. In the first week of its release, the number of viewers reached 955,710 and it grossed ₺12.2 million. The movie was released on 7 December 2017 in Germany, Austria, Belgium, the United Kingdom, Denmark, France, the Netherlands and Switzerland. Two premiere ceremonies were held on 7 December 2017 in Cologne, and on 9 December 2017 in Amsterdam for the movie.

The movie was on the screens until 22 March 2018 and grossed ₺64,283,667 in total. It was later shown again in a number of theaters and its total gross rose up to ₺64,552,125. The movie was watched by 5,273,529 people in total and became the seventh most-watched movie of the year in Turkey.

== Reception ==
=== Critical response ===
Aile Arasında received generally positive reviews from critics. Writing for T24, Atilla Dorsay described the movie as a "real and clever comedy". In his review for Sözcü Burak Göral did not find any "innovation" in the movie but added that its scenario "does not surrender to the cheapness of the recent comedy films." Habertürk author Mehmet Açar commented on the film, which he considered to be "a fun comedy based on cultural conflicts," and is "over-packed with comedy material." Nil Kural from Milliyet described the movie as "a presentable comedy" with "Successful acting performances that are accompanied by an elaborate screenplay and directing, creating a mainstream comedy that we had not seen in a while". Writing for Hürriyet, Uğur Vardan said: "The scenario is somehow influenced by Avrupa Yakası and Yalan Dünya, and to some extent by The Birdcage, but in general it succeeds in making its audience laugh as a comedy movie." In his review for Posta, Kerem Akça wrote: "In spite of its shortcomings, it is hard to find such a good written and well-played family comedy in our commercial cinema." Sabah's Olkan Özyurt mentioned in his review that the film had not lived up to his expectations.

=== Accolades ===
Award	Date	Category	Nominee	Result	References
Cinema Writers Association Awards	13 March 2018	Best Supporting Actress	Ayta Sözeri	Won	
Sadri Alışık Theater and Cinema Awards	7 May 2018	Most Successful Actress of the Year (Cinema - Comedy)	Demet Evgar	Won	
Sadri Alışık Theater and Cinema Awards	7 May 2018	Most Successful Actor of the Year (Cinema - Comedy)	Engin Günaydın	Won	
Sadri Alışık Theater and Cinema Awards	7 May 2018	Most Successful Supporting Actress of the Year (Cinema - Comedy)	Ayta Sözeri	Won	
Sadri Alışık Theater and Cinema Awards	7 May 2018	Most Successful Supporting Actor of the Year (Cinema - Comedy)	Erdal Özyağcılar	Nominated	
Magazin Journalists Association Awards	8 May 2018	Best Film	Aile Arasında	Won	
International İzmir Artemis Film Festival	31 August 2018	Best Film	Aile Arasında	Nominated	
International İzmir Artemis Film Festival	31 August 2018	Best Director	Ozan Açıktan	Nominated	
International İzmir Artemis Film Festival	31 August 2018	Best Screenplay	Gülse Birsel	Won	
International İzmir Artemis Film Festival	31 August 2018	Best Editing	Erkan Erdem	Nominated	
International İzmir Artemis Film Festival	31 August 2018	Best Art Director	Tuba Erdem, Nevin Ünlütürk	Nominated	
International İzmir Artemis Film Festival	31 August 2018	Best Actress	Demet Evgar	Won	
International İzmir Artemis Film Festival	31 August 2018	Best Actor	Engin Günaydın	Won	
International İzmir Artemis Film Festival	31 August 2018	Best Supporting Actress	Ayta Sözeri	Won	
International İzmir Artemis Film Festival	31 August 2018	Best Supporting Actor	Fatih Artman	Nominated	
