= Nihal Yalçın =

Turkish actress (born 1981)

- Born: 29 March 1981 (age 45); Istanbul, Turkey
- Occupations: Actress, comedian
- Years active: 2005–present

Nihal Yalçın (born 29 March 1981) is a Turkish actress.

== Career ==
In 2005 she appeared in the movie Hacivat Karagöz Neden Öldürüldü? as Zeyno Bacı and in 2009 in Ay Lav Yu as Rukiye. She briefly joined Avrupa Yakası as Meryem.

She prepared a segment called "Life Sux" in Okan Bayülgen's Disko Kralı. She had appeared in the role of several fictional characters for Disko Kralı including "Nahide Ekengil": an electronic-pop singer, "Ayla Tanyürek", "Fahriye Soykır": Turkish actress and Şahane Çancı: animal rights activist.

In 2012 she was cast in one of the prominent roles in Yalan Dünya as Açılay.

== Musical career ==
She occasionally performs as her fictional characters in the TV series, examples of which include her performance of "Sahibinin Sesi", "Alamazsın Sen Beni" and "Pilates" as Nahide Ekengil. All three songs were written by herself. In 2011 she appeared in Little Caesars commercial where she performed the song "Küçük Sezar" as "Ne'li". Later this song was released as a promotional single. In 2012, she performed "Bir Mumdur" and "Dertler Benim Olsun" covers and "Ne Kadar Güzelsin" in Kurtuluş Son Durak. "Bir Mumdur" and "Dertler Benim Olsun" are well-known songs in Turkey, while "Ne Kadar Güzelsin" is written by herself.

== Personal life ==
She is of Alevi Zaza descent and has 3 sisters and a brother. She graduated from Istanbul University State Conservatory with acting major. Then she made advanced acting masters in Bahçeşehir University.

== Filmography ==
Year	Title	Role	Notes	Format
2005	Hacivat Karagöz Neden Öldürüldü?	Bacı Zeyno		Film
2007	Şöhret Okulu	Sirvan		TV series
2007	Valley of the Wolves	Actress	1st season	TV series
2009	Ay Lav Yu	Rukiye		Film
2009	Kış Masalı	Figen		TV series
2009	Güldünya	Guest actress		TV series
2009	Hayatın Tuzu	Süheyla		Film
2009	Avrupa Yakası	Meryem	6th season	TV series
2010	Cümbür Cemaat Aile	Rahime Yıldız		TV series
2012	Kurtuluş Son Durak	Goncagül		Film
2012–2013	Yalan Dünya	Açılay	Seasons 1-2	TV series
2012	Berlin Kaplanı	Elvan		Film
2012	Yeraltı	Türkan		Film
2012	Araf	Derya		Film
2015	Beş Kardeş	Canan		TV series
2017	Yol Ayrımı			Film
2019	İstanbullu Gelin	Güneş Köksal		TV series
2021	Seni Buldum Ya!			Film
2021	Kırmızı Oda	Rezzan		TV series
2022–	Oğlum	Melike Özyürek		TV series
2024-2025	Bahar	Efsun		TV series

== Awards ==
- 19th International Adana Golden Boll Film Festival Best supporting female actress (for Yeraltı and Araf)
- 17th Sadri Alışık Awards Best supporting female actress (Comedy) (for Kurtuluş Son Durak)
