= Ceza =

Turkish rapper

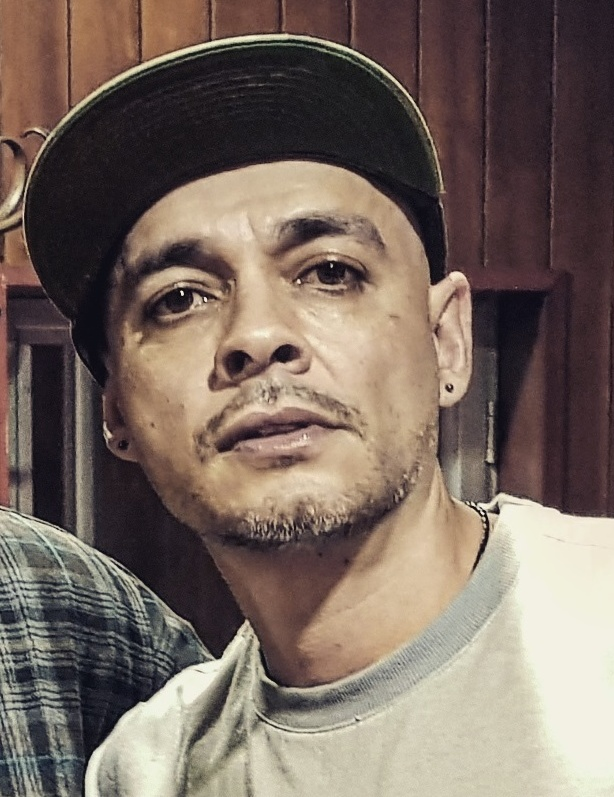
- Ceza in 2018

Background information
- Also known as: Ceza; Fatalrhymer; Fatalflex; Keskinkılıç; Bloody
- Born: Bilgin Özçalkan; 31 December 1976 (age 49); Üsküdar, Istanbul, Turkey
- Genres: Hip hop, Political hip hop
- Occupations: Rapper; Singer; Songwriter; Breakdancer
- Instrument: Vocals
- Years active: 1995–present
- Labels: Kod Müzik (1999); Hammer Müzik (2000–2006); EMI (2006); Orijinal Müzik (2008); Pasaj Müzik (2009); Esen Müzik (2010–present)
- Formerly of: • Uslanmaz Çocuklar Senfonisi (1995–1997) • Nefret (1998–2004) • Kuvvetmira (1998–2005) • Asya Sentez (1999–Unknown)
- Website: www.ceza.com.tr

Bilgin Özçalkan (Turkish pronunciation: [bilˈɟin ˈœzt͡ʃaɫˌkan]; born 31 December 1976), also known by his stage name Ceza (pronounced [dʒeˈzaː], Turkish for "punishment"), is a Turkish rapper, singer, and songwriter.

== Early works ==
In 1995, Özçalkan started a group called U.C.S and performed with this group until about 1998. His group Nefret was signed under Hammer Music in 2000, leading to the release of the album Meclis Ala – İstanbul. In 2001, Özçalkan released the album Anahtar. The title track, which shares the same name as the album, was the first to have an accompanying music video. The album was a great success, and Özçalkan performed at many concerts promoting it.

However, Özçalkan's major breakthrough came in 2004 when he was invited to perform at RockIstanbul, one of Turkey's biggest rock festivals. This opportunity allowed him to showcase his rap music in an environment featuring some of Turkey’s most popular music acts.

In 2005, at the Turkish rock music festival Rock 'n Coke, Ceza performed a profanity-laden freestyle rap directed at singer Kıraç, who had made dismissive comments about rap not being real music.

Following these events, Özçalkan collaborated with artist Mercan Dede on his album Su ("Water").

== Personal life ==
Özçalkan was born on 31 December 1976 in Üsküdar, Istanbul, but his birth was officially registered on 1 January 1977. Before pursuing a career in rap, he worked for eight years as an electrician. In 2007, he became the first and only Turkish singer to win an MTV Music Award. That same year, he launched his own clothing brand, Evin Delisi.

His sister, Ayben Özçalkan Ülkü, is also a rapper.

== Discography ==
=== Solo albums ===
Year	Title	Label
2002	Med Cezir	Hammer Müzik
2004	Rapstar	Hammer Müzik
2005	Feyz Al	Hammer Müzik
2006	Yerli Plaka	Hammer Müzik
2007	Evin Delisi	Underground EP
2010	Onuncu Köy	Esen Müzik
2010	Artık Suç Değil Sevgi İşleyin - Yüksek Gerilim	Esen Müzik
2015	Suspus	Esen Müzik
2024	Yatay Zeka	ED Müzik

=== Split albums ===
with Güven (Uslanmaz Çocuklar Senfonisi)

Year	Title	Label
1996	Af Yok	Unknown Label

with Silahsız Kuvvet, Yener, Statik, Susturucu, Ses as 'Nefret'

(Compilation Album)

Year	Title	Label
1999	Yeraltı Operasyonu	Hammer Müzik

with Dr. Fuchs (Nefret)

Year	Title	Label
1999	Vatan (EP)	Underground
2000	Meclis-i Ala İstanbul	Hammer Müzik
2001	Anahtar	Hammer Müzik
2001	Vatan (Album Version)	Unknown Label

with DJ Mic Check (Asya Sentez)

Year	Title	Label
2000	Toplama Kampı	Unknown Label
2001	Toplama Kampı 2	Unknown Label

with Killa Hakan

Year	Title	Label
2008	Bomba Plak	Dolunay Müzik & Orijinal Müzik

=== Singles ===
- "Streetball Underground" (1995)
- "Benim Adım Ceza" (feat. Dr.Fuchs) (1996)
- "Gangsta (Nefret Version)" (feat. Dr.Fuchs & Beast) (1996)
- "Doğuştan Katil (Demo)" (feat. Dj Walkie D, Dj Arda, Yanetki, Cem, Blackcat) (1999)
- "Beyin (Holocaust Part 1)" (feat Rokabeat) (2002)
- "Holocaust (Sagopa's version)" (2002)
- "Uyuşturucuya Dur Diyen Yok"(2002)
- "Açık Ara Bul Kon" (2009)
- "Artık Suç Değil Sevgi İşleyin" (2010)
- "Sende Biraz Delisin" (2011)
- "Türk Marşı" (2012)
- "Mind Right" (feat. Kaan) (2016)
- "Denizci" (2018)
- "Fight Kulüp" (feat. Killa Hakan & Ezhel & Ben Fero) (2019)
- "Komedi v Dram" (feat. Sayedar & Önder Şahin) (2019)
- "Beatcoin" (2019)
- "Yak" (with Tepki) (2020)
- "Yeni Mesaj" (2020)

=== Unreleased singles ===
The unreleased demo singles belonging to 'Asya Sentez' should not confused with the 'Nefret' songs that are released with the same name.

- "Tik Tak Tik" (Asya Sentez) (1999)
- "Yüz Yüze" (Asya Sentez) (1999)
- "Kukla" (Asya Sentez) (1999)
- "Saadetin Adı" (Asya Sentez) (1999)
- "Pop Pop" (Asya Sentez) (2000)
- "Hiphop Bi' Bomba" (Asya Sentez) (2000)
- "Kuvvetmira Crew" (Asya Sentez) (2000) (Existence is not confirmed)
- "Rapin Devleri" (feat Silahsız Kuvvet & Sirhot) (2001)
- "Rap Hediye" (feat Silahsız Kuvvet & Sirhot) (2001)

International (as featured artist)

Year	Single	Peak position	Certification
Year	Single	US	Certification
2011	"Worldwide Choppers" (Tech N9ne featuring Busta Rhymes, Yelawolf, Twista, U$O, Ceza, D-Loc, JL of B.Hood & Twisted Insane)	104	

== Filmography ==
Year	Title	Role
2005	Crossing the Bridge: The Sound of Istanbul	Himself
2013	Leyla and Mecnun	'Guest appearance'
