= Yerli Plaka =

Studio album by Ceza
- Released: August 29, 2006
- Genre: Rap
- Length: 69:40
- Label: EMI

Ceza chronology
Feyz Al (2005)	Yerli Plaka (2006)	Evin Delisi (2007)

Yerli Plaka is the third studio album by Turkish rapper Bilgin Özçalkan, under his pseudonym Ceza. It was released on 29 August 2006, by EMI. The album includes 17 tracks. Tracks from the album were included in Turkish crime drama TV series Adanalı and heist comedy film The Masked Gang: Iraq.

Ceza initially announced the album with the 5 track long Feyz Al EP in 2005 and the album was released one year later. Album's lead single "Yerli Plaka" featured a music video directed by Thomas Garber. The song became the sixth in MTV Europe's World Chart Express in the week it was released. Second single from the album, "Gelsin Hayat Bildiği Gibi" is a collaboration with Turkish pop singer Sezen Aksu. "Önce Kendine Bak" is a song dedicated to the ethnic minorities of Turkey. "Fark Var" became the main theme song of Adanalı. Its cover was used as a theme song by the Felicity Party and a website titled "farkvar.org" was created for 2009 Turkish local elections. However, Ceza didn't approve the use of his song and sued Felicity Party for 30.000 Turkish liras.

== Track listing ==
1. "Kemerini Bağla" - 03:32
2. "Yerli Plaka" - 04:15
3. "Gelsin Hayat Bildiği Gibi" (feat. Sezen Aksu) - 04:56
4. "Şaşkın Oğlan" (feat. Ayben) - 04:02
5. "Sen Oyna Dilber (Remix)" - 03:10
6. "Dark Places" (feat. Tech N9ne) - 04:55
7. "Orient Jazz" (feat. Samy Deluxe, Afrob & Sahtiyan) - 04:49
8. "Efkar Perdesi" - 04:15
9. "Hadi Bize Bağlan" (feat. Eko Fresh, Killa Hakan & Summer Cem) - 04:45
10. "Fark Var" - 04:15
11. "Gece Gündüz Karışmaz" - 04:58
12. "Pusulam Yok" (feat. Alaturka Mavzer, Mihenk Taşı & Emre) - 05:35
13. "Önce Kendine Bak" - 04:52
14. "Gene Elde Mendil" (feat. Sahtiyan & Yener)
15. "Acı Biber" - 03:50
16. "Hiza ve Nizam Yok" - 04:31
17. "Ne Benim" - 03:39
