= Macide Tanır =

Turkish actress

- Born: 1 January 1922
- Died: 6 February 2013 (aged 91); Istanbul, Turkey
- Other name: "Tiyatronun Cadısı" (The Witch of the Theater)
- Education: Ankara State Conservatory Theater and Opera Departments
- Occupation: Actress
- Years active: 1943–2012
- Awards: 1991 - State Artist

Macide Tanır (1 January 1922 – 6 February 2013) was a Turkish actress.

In 1943, she joined the Turkish State Theatres and continued her career on stage until 1985. In 1991, she was named a State Artist. Aside from her career on stage and cinema, she was also known for her roles as a voice actress.

== Life and career ==
Tanır was born in 1922. Her father, İbrahim Birmeç, was a veterinary officer who migrated from Ioannina to Istanbul. She was raised in Pendik. After finishing her studies at Erenköy Girls High School she enrolled in the Ankara State Conservatory with her father's support. She started her education in the singing department. A year later, she switched to the theater department. She joined the State Theatres in 1943 after earning her master's degree. She first went on stage with a role in an adaptation of Molière's Le Bourgeois gentilhomme. She appeared on stage in more than sixty works. She left the State Theatres in 1985 and worked for Tiyatrokare for two years.

After ending her stage career, she was cast in the movies Yer Demir Gök Bakır, Yengeç Sepeti, and Cumhuriyet as well as the TV series Baharın Bittiği Yer and Şehnaz Tango. She also became known for her roles in radio theatre adaptations and worked as a voice actress on the Turkish version of a couple of movies.

In 1991, she was named a State Artist and later published her memoire Tiyatronun Cadısı in 2000. She died of respiratory failure in the intensive care unit on 6 February 2013. Tanır's body was buried in Emirgan Cemetery.

== Awards ==
- 1961-62 Press poll among theater artists - Artist of the Year (Trees Die while Standing)
- 1964-65 Press-Workers Union - Artist of the Year (Order of the World)
- 1968-69 Art Lovers' Association - Best Actress (Hair Share)
- 1973-74 Art Lovers' Association - Best Actress (Mistake)
- Art Foundation - Best Actress (Shadow Master)
- 1988 Ministry of Culture - Special Jury Prize
- 1988 City Theaters - Artist of the Year
- 1988 Hürriyet Newspaper - Artist of the Year
- 1989 Women's Union - Most Successful Artist
- 1990 Mersin Culture and Art Festival - Honorary Award
- 1990 Art Institution - Artist of the Year
- 1991 State Artist
- 1992-93 Avni Dilligil Honor Award - Guests of the House Without Music
- 1992-93 Italian Ministry of Culture - Adelaide Ristari Prize
- 1993 Ses-Der Award
- 1993-94 Istanbul International Lions Club Award
- 1996 Half Century On Stage - Golden Needle
- 1996 Lions Board of Directors Award
- 1996-97 ÇASOD Award
- 1997 1st Afife Theater Awards - Nisa Serezli Aşkıner Special Award
- 1998 Women's Union Şişli Branch 75th Anniversary of the Republic Award
- 1998 Mimoza Magazine - Awards to 75 Women in 75 Years

== Theatre ==
Some works are included not under their original title, but rather under the title used for their adaptation.

- Lost in Yonkers : Neil Simon - Tiyatrokare - 1992
- Öyle Bir Sevgi Ki : Loleh Bellon - Ankara State Theatre - 1985
- On Golden Pond : Ernest Thompson - Ankara State Theatre - 1983
- Gölge Ustası : Yıldırım Türker\Yeşim Müderrisoğlu - Ankara State Theatre - 1982
- Lady Windermere's Fan : Oscar Wilde - Ankara State Theatre - 1977
- Dirlik Düzenlik : Oktay Rifat - Ankara State Theatre - 1974
- The Misunderstanding : Albert Camus - Ankara State Theatre - 1973
- Becket : Jean Anouilh - Ankara State Theatre - 1971
- Blood Wedding : Federico Garcia Lorca - Ankara State Theatre - 1970
- Finten : Abdülhak Hamit Tarhan - Ankara State Theatre - 1969
- Kıl Payı : Edward Albee - Ankara State Theatre - 1968
- Ecinliler : Fyodor Dostoyevski\Albert Camus - Ankara State Theatre - 1966
- Dünyanın Düzeni : Seán O'Casey - Ankara State Theatre - 1964
- Düşman Çiçek Göndermez : Pero Bloch - Ankara State Theatre - 1963
- Los árboles mueren de pie : Alejandro Casona - Ankara State Theatre - 1961
- Ghosts : Henrik Ibsen - Ankara State Theatre - 1960
- Cephede Piknik : Fernando Arrabal - Ankara State Theatre - 1960
- Günden Geceye : Eugene O'Neill - Ankara State Theatre - 1959
- Gönül Avcısı : Diego Fabbri - Ankara State Theatre - 1958
- Kraliçe ve Asilleri : Albert Hackett\Frances Goodrich - Ankara State Theatre - 1957
- Ruhlar Gelirse : Noël Coward - Ankara State Theatre - 1955
- Nora : Henrik Ibsen - Ankara State Theatre - 1955
- Akif Bey : Namık Kemal\Reşat Nuri Güntekin - Ankara State Theatre - 1955
- Tanrılar ve İnsanlar (Gilgamesh) : Orhan Asena - Ankara State Theatre - 1954
- Othello : William Shakespeare - Ankara State Theatre - 1954
- Keçiler Adası : Ugo Betti - Ankara State Theatre - 1954
- Hile ve Sevgi : Schiller - Ankara State Theatre - 1954
- Güneşte On Kişi : Turgut Özakman - Ankara State Theatre - 1954
- Batak : Galip Güral - Ankara State Theatre - 1953
- Yanlış Yanlış Üstüne : Oliver Goldsmith - Ankara State Theatre - 1952
- Sahne Dışındaki Oyun : Refik Ahmet Sevengi - Ankara State Theatre - 1952
- Fatih : Nazım Kurşunlu - Ankara State Theatre - 1952
- Ramak Kaldı : Thornton Wilder - Ankara State Theatre - 1952
- Gölgeler : Ahmet Muhip Dranas - Ankara State Theatre - 1952
- Elektra : Sophocles - Ankara State Theatre - 1952
- Bir Piyes Yazalım : Adalet Ağaoğlu - Ankara State Theatre - 1952
- Öteye Doğru : Sutton Vane - Ankara State Theatre - 1951
- Legacy : Augustus Goetz - Ankara State Theatre - 1951
- Köşebaşı : Ahmet Kutsi Tecer - Ankara State Theatre - 1951
- Alınyazısı : Nahid Sırrı Örik - Ankara State Theatre - 1951
- Şakacı : Sabahattin Kudret Aksal - Ankara State Theatre - 1951
- Pembe Evin Kaderi : Turgut Özakman - Ankara State Theatre - 1950
- The Old Tune : Reşat Nuri Güntekin - Ankara State Theatre - 1950
- Peer Gynt : Henrik Ibsen - Ankara State Theatre - 1949
- Küçük Şehir : Cevat Fehmi Başkut - Ankara State Theatre - 1949
- Kıskançlar : Oktay Rıfat\Melih Cevdet Anday - Ankara State Theatre - 1949
- Hekimliğin Zaferi : Jules Romains - Ankara State Theatre - 1949
- Mercator : Plautus - Ankara State Theatre - 1949
- Dünya Gözüyle : Charles Vildrac - Ankara State Theatre - 1949
- Scapin the Schemer : Molière - Ankara State Theatre - 1949
- Antigone : Sophocles - Ankara State Theatre- 1949

== Filmography ==
- 1987 Yer Demir Gök Bakır
- 1989 Baharın Bittiği Yer
- 1994 Cadı Ağacı
- 1994 Yengeç Sepeti
- 1996 Şehnaz Tango (TV series)
- 1996 Kurtuluş
- 1998 Cumhuriyet

== Voice acting ==
- Goodbye Again - as Paula Tessier (portrayed by Ingrid Bergman)
- Gilda - as Gilda Mundson Farrell (portrayed by Rita Hayworth)
- Titanic
- Murder, She Wrote (TV series)

== Radio theatre ==
- 1966: Brahms'ı Sever misiniz? (from the series Arkası Yarın, an adaptation of a novel by Françoise Sagan)

== Books ==
- "Tiyatronun Cadısı", Macide Tanır, Bilgi Yayınevi (autobiography/memoire), Ankara, 2000.
