= Iron Earth, Copper Sky =

1987 film

- Film poster
- Directed by: Zülfü Livaneli
- Written by: Zülfü Livaneli; Yasar Kemal
- Produced by: Renée Gundelach; Ülker Livaneli; Wim Wenders
- Starring: Rutkay Aziz
- Cinematography: Jürgen Jürges
- Release date: 4 May 1987
- Country: Turkey
- Language: Turkish

Iron Earth, Copper Sky (Turkish: Yer Demir Gök Bakır) is a 1987 German-Turkish drama film, written, produced and directed by Zülfü Livaneli based on the novel of the same name by Yaşar Kemal, featuring Rutkay Aziz as a simple villager elevated to sainthood status while still alive. The film, which premiered in the Un Certain Regard section at the 1987 Cannes Film Festival on 4 May 1987, won the OCIC Award at the 1987 San Sebastián International Film Festival and a German Camera Award for Jürgen Jürges.

== Cast ==
- Rutkay Aziz
- Yavuzer Çetinkaya
- Gürel Yontan
- Uğur Esen
- Macide Tanır
- Serap Aksoy
- Tuncay Akça
- Yasemin Alkaya
- Rana Cabbar
- Melih Çardak
- Ingeborg Carsters
- Dilek Damlacık
- Eray Özbal
- Peter Schulze
- Yudum Yontan
