= Giray Altınok =

Turkish actor (born 1983)

- Born: 11 December 1983 (age 42); Erbaa, Turkey
- Occupations: Actor, scriptwriter
- Years active: 2011–present
- Spouse: Cansu Diktaş (m. 2018)
- Children: 1

Giray Altınok (born 11 December 1983) is a Turkish actor and scriptwriter.

== Life and career ==
Giray Altınok was born in 1983 in Erbaa, Tokat, and was raised in Çorlu. He graduated from Pamukkale University, School of Sociology. He received acting training at Akademi 35 Buçuk.

In his cinematic career, he was cast with the franchise movies Kaybedenler Kulübü, "Ölümlü Dünya 2", "Düğün Dernek 2". He wrote and starred in Hababam Sınıfı Yaz Oyunları, a sequel to the classic film series of Turkish cinema, Hababam Sınıfı.

He also starred in Show TV's theatrical sketches Güldür Güldür Show. With Kerem Özdoğan, he starred in improvisation comedy program "Buyur Bi'de Burdan Bak". He works as screenwriter and actor with Kerem Özdoğan for many times.

In 2023 he began starring in BluTV's comedy historical fiction web series Prens, which earned him the Golden Butterfly Award for Best Comedy Actor in 2024.

== Filmography ==
Films
Year	Title	Role	Notes
2011	Kaybedenler Kulübü	Artist Hakan	
2011	Labirent	Ahmet	
2011	Vücut	Doctor	
2013	G.D.O. KaraKedi	Sinan	
2014	Tut Sözünü	Yalçın	also scriptwriter
2015	Düğün Dernek 2: Sünnet	Mafia Man	
2019	Hababam Sınıfı Yeniden	Racon Faruk	
2019	Aykut Enişte	–	scriptwriter
2020	Baba Parası	Guard	
2020	Hanımağa'nın Gelinleri	Mustafa	
2020	Çatlak	Cafer	
2021	Bize Müsaade	Tekin	also scriptwriter and director
2021	Hababam Sınıfı Yaz Oyunları	Racon Faruk	also scriptwriter
2021	Aykut Enişte 2	–	scriptwriter
2021	Zoraki Misafir	–	scriptwriter
2022	Bana Karanlığını Anlat		
2023	Ölümlü Dünya 2	Şenol	
2025	Başka Bir Sen	Mümtaz	
Streaming series
Year	Title	Role	Notes
2022–2023	Var Bunlar	Tufan Ardıç	also scriptwriter
2022–2023	Sizi Dinliyorum	–	scriptwriter
2023–	Prens	Prince	also scriptwriter
2024	Karşılaşmalar		also scriptwriter and director
TV Programming
Year	Title	Role	Notes
2008	Anında Görüntü Show		
2015–2018	Buyur Bi'De Burdan Bak	Giray	
2020-2023	Güldür Güldür Show	Feridun	
TV Series
Year	Title	Role	Notes
2013	Aşkın Bedeli	Akrep Bilal	
2019	Kurşun		
