= Robbery Alla Turca =

2005 film directed by Oguzhan Tercan

Robbery Alla Turca Hırsız Var!
- Theatrical poster
- Directed by: Oğuzhan Tercan
- Written by: Haluk Özenç
- Produced by: Mehmet N. Karaca; Ali Akdeniz
- Starring: Haluk Bilginer; Mehmet Ali Erbil; Gamze Özçelik; Gülse Birsel; Birol Ünel
- Cinematography: Tolga Kutlar
- Music by: İskender Paydaş
- Distributed by: UIP
- Release date: 21 January 2005
- Running time: 100 minutes
- Country: Turkey
- Language: Turkish

Robbery Alla Turca (Turkish title: Hırsız Var!, meaning "There's a Thief!") is a 2005 Turkish comedy film directed by Oğuzhan Tercan.

== Plot ==
The authorities raid a millionaire's home and expropriate his properties, which include some paintings from the family heirloom. The paintings are taken to an exhibition centre where Seçkin, the designer brother of the millionaire's wife Binnur is set to have his fashion show. Two thieves from Germany, Pamir and Lokman arrive in Turkey with plans to steal the paintings. Meanwhile, a gangster Ekrem is released from prison and he seeks to get even with his ex-girlfriend Ceren, who is one of Seçkin's models.

== Cast ==
- Haluk Bilginer as Seçkin Doruk
- Mehmet Ali Erbil as Ekrem
- Gamze Özçelik as Ceren
- Gülse Birsel as Binnur
- Birol Ünel as Pamir
- Fatih Akın as Lokman
- Dost Elver as Gökhan
- Suna Pekuysal as Nezaket
- Ahmet Mümtaz Taylan as Orkun
- Haldun Boysan as Fethi
- Esra Eron as Begüm
- Hakan Salınmış as Turgut
