= Derya Karadaş =

Turkish actress (born 1981)

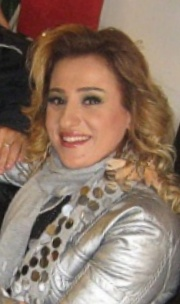
- Karadaş in 2014
- Born: 4 May 1981 (age 44); Istanbul, Turkey
- Occupation: Actress
- Spouse: Haki Biçici (m. 2016)

Derya Karadaş (born 4 May 1981) is a Turkish actress of Kurdish origin. Her family, who migrated from Tunceli to Bingöl, later moved to Istanbul in 1980. She is of Kurdish descent and believes Alawite.

She rose to prominence with her role as Zerrin in hit sitcom Yalan Dünya. She played in sketches theatre "Güldür Güldür". She studied at the Müjdat Gezen Art Center conservatory and is an instructor at the same institute.

== Filmography ==
=== Programs ===
Year	Title
2015	Komedi Türkiye
2015-2017	Güldür Güldür Show

=== Movies ===
Year	Title
2008	Fırtına
2015	Geniş Aile: Yapıştır
2015	Şeytan Tüyü
2017	Cici Babam
2017	Aile Arasında
2022	Yılbaşı Gecesi

=== Web Series ===
Year	Title
2018-2020	Jet Sosyete
2020	Bir Başkadır
2022	Andropoz

=== TV series ===
Year	Title
2007	Gemilerde Talim Var
2007	Kurtlar Vadisi Terör
2009	Bana Bunlarla Gel
2010	Şen Yuva
2012-2014	Yalan Dünya

== Theater ==
- Dur Bi Dakka (2012)
- Prometheus Bound
- The Double (Dostoevsky novel)

== Awards ==
- 2013 Antalya Televizyon Ödülleri - Best Supporting Actress in a Comedy Series (Yalan Dünya)
- 2013 İstanbul Aydın Üniversitesi 9. İletişim Ödülleri - Best Comedy Actress of the Year (Yalan Dünya)
- 2024 25. Sadri Alışık Tiyatro ve Sinema Oyuncu Ödülleri - Best Supporting Comedy Actress of the Year (İyi Bir Aile Değiliz)
