= İrem Sak =

Turkish actress (born 1986)

- Born: 9 February 1986 (age 39); Sivas, Turkey
- Education: Istanbul University
- Occupation: Actress
- Years active: 2010–present

İrem Sak (born 9 February 1986) is a Turkish actress.

== Life and career ==
Sak was born in 1986 in Sivas. She is of Circassian descent. She finished her high school education there, and in 2006 moved to Istanbul. She graduated from Istanbul University with a degree in American Culture and Literature studies.

After appearing on stage during her high school years, in 2008 she joined BKM Theatre (Beşiktaş Culture Center) and portrayed the character of Zeytin in the play Sizinkiler. In the same year, she appeared in a number of commercials for different brands. She made her television debut with the series Şen Yuva, in which played the role of Şehrazat. In 2011, she was cast in BKM programs by Meltem Bozoflu, titled "5'er Beşer" and "İnsanlar Alemi", in which she had the role of Sinem.

She played the cast of Kanal D's hit sitcom series Yalan Dünya, written by Gülse Birsel. Between 2015 and 2018, she starred in BKM sketch show Güldür Güldür. In 2017, she received the Best Supporting Actress award at the 28th Ankara International Film Festival for her role in Martı. She continued her cinematic career with roles in Dönerse Senindir, Ölümlü Dünya and Düğüm Salonu, and in 2019 she appeared in the drama series Bir Aile Hikayesi as Müjde Güneş. İrem Sak was joined Çukur - The Pit Turkish TV series between 2020 and 2021 as Seren Erdenet. In 2022 she appeared in Kuş Uçuşu - As The Crow Flies Netflix series as Müge, one of the four main characters of the story, with a remarkable performance.

In 2012, together with Sarp Apak and Öner Erkan she hosted the Golden Butterfly Awards.

== Filmography ==
=== Theatre Record ===
Title	Year	Role
5'er Beşer	2011	Sinem
İnsanlar Alemi	2012	Sinem
Buyur Bi'De Burdan Bak	2015	
Güldür Güldür Show	2015–18	Sinem

=== Film ===
Title	Year	Role
Dedemin Fişi	2016	Kader
Dönerse Senindir	2016	Defne
Martı	2017	Nurgül
Ölümlü Dünya	2018	Begüm
Düğüm Salonu	2018	Hülya
Cici Babam	2018	Şevkiye
Azizler	2021	Burcu
Yılbaşı Gecesi	2022	Neslişah

=== Web Series ===
Title	Year	Role
Jet Sosyete	2020	Herself (guest appearance)
Kuş Uçuşu	2022	Müge

=== Tv Series ===
Title	Year	Role
Şen Yuva	2010	Şehrazat
Yalan Dünya	2012–14	Tülay
Gülperi	2018	Herself (guest appearance)
Bir Aile Hikayesi	2019	Müjde
Çukur	2020–21	Seren Erdenet

== Theatre ==
- Hepimizin Öyküsü Aynı : Dario-Fo - Craft Theatre (2015–17)

== Awards ==
- 3. OMÜ Media Awards - Youth Club Special Award (Yalan Dünya)
- 9th Kemal Sunal Culture and Art Awards - Best TV Actress (Yalan Dünya)
- 21st Sadri Alışık Theatre and Cinema Awards - Selection Committee Special Award (Hepimizin Öyküsü Aynı, Craft Theatre)
- 28th Ankara International Film Festival - Best Supporting Actress (Martı)
