= Yalan Dünya =

Turkish television series

- Genre: Comedy, Sit-com
- Created by: Gülse Birsel
- Developed by: Gülse Birsel
- Written by: Gülse Birsel
- Directed by: Jale Atabey Özerk
- Creative director: Gülse Birsel
- Starring: Gülse Birsel; Beyazıt Öztürk; Sarp Apak; Nihal Yalçın; Öner Erkan; Tuna Orhan; Hakan Meriçlilier; Olgun Şimşek; Hasibe Eren; Bartu Küçükçağlayan; Altan Erkekli; Füsun Demirel; Derya Karadaş; İrem Sak
- Narrated by: Gülse Birsel
- Theme music composer: Nil Karaibrahimgil
- Opening theme: Yalan Dünya - Nil Karaibrahimgil
- Ending theme: Hakkında Herşeyi Duymak İstiyorum - Nil Karaibrahimgil
- Composers: Nil Karaibrahimgil, Eren Gümrükçüoğlu
- Country of origin: Turkey
- Original language: Turkish
- No. of seasons: 4
- No. of episodes: 90

Production
- Executive producer: Gülse Birsel
- Producer: Gülse Birsel
- Production locations: Cihangir, Istanbul, Turkey
- Running time: 90 minutes
- Production company: D-productions

Original release
- Release: 13 January 2012 – 19 November 2014

Yalan Dünya (Lie World) is a Turkish TV series produced by Gülse Birsel and directed by Jale Atabey in 2012.

== Plot ==
Yalan Dünya is a sit-com combining the parallels between actors and families in Cihangir, Istanbul, an up-and-coming neighbourhood with a lot of bohemians and nouveau riche families. The story begins when Açılay and Deniz move in together in this new city along with Deniz's brother Bora, who befriends one of the main actors on the show, Fırat'ın Yazgısı. They move in next door to a conservative family and frequently interact with them on the shared terrace of their apartment building. One of the main actresses falls in the love with the next-door family's single bachelor. Deniz, the main actress, and Rıza fall in love. Rıza's family is against their relationship; they have other plans for him with another woman "Nurhayat". To them, Nurhayat is perfect for him: her family is rich, she's a perfect housewife, and she's a germophobe.

== Cast ==
- Gülse Birsel - Deniz Alsancak - Star of "Fırat'ın Yazgısı".
- Beyazıt Öztürk - Rıza Kocabaş - Son of Şehmuz and Servet Kocabaş and Deniz's love interest.
- Öner Erkan - Bora Alsancak - Deniz's brother and Emir's best friend from high school.
- Sarp Apak - Emir - Actor in "Fırat'ın Yazgısı". Famous and handsome actor. Açılay's love interest.
- Nihal Yalçın - Açılay - Actress of "Fırat'ın Yazgısı". Emir's love interest and an occasionally neurotic actress - housemates with Deniz and Deniz's brother, Bora
- Gupse Özay - Nurhayat Karakaş - Fiancé of Rıza. She speaks very fast, hates Deniz and is materialistic/selfish.
- Cihat Tamer - Yıldırım Karakaş - Nurhayat and Bünyamin's father.
- Nurseli İdiz - Nursel Karakaş - Nurhayat and Bünyamin's mother.
- Ömür Arpacı - Reis - Employee at the workplace of Selahattin Çakaler. The Black Sea.
- Okan Çabalar - Bünyamin Karakaş - Nurhayat's hyperactive brother. Zerrin's lover.
- Olgun Şimşek (in two different roles) - Ahmet Çakaler - Actor of "Fırat'ın Yazgısı". Selahattin Çakaler's twin brother. / Selahattin Çakaler - Conservative neighbour, married to Gülistan, cheating on his wife with Tülay.
- Tuna Orhan - Tufan - director, producer and writer of "Fırat'ın Yazgısı" frequently depicted as arrogant and over-the-top.
- Hakan Meriçlilier - Çağatay Koçtuğ- Star of "Fırat'ın Yazgısı" and Tufan's best friend.
- Bartu Küçükçağlayan - Orçun Çakaler- Gülistan and Selahattin's overgrown, loser son whose main goal in life is to be kissed by a girl
- Altan Erkekli - Şehmuz Kocabaş- Patriarch of Kocabaş family.
- Füsun Demirel - Servet Kocabaş - Mother of the Kocabaş family. She's an old-school housewife.
- Rutkay Aziz - Timur Alsancak - He is a leftist and an intellectual man. Deniz and Bora's father.
- Hümeyra - Çiğdem Alsancak - Deniz and Bora's mother.
- Hasibe Eren - Gülistan Kocabaş-Çakaler- Daughter of Şehmuz and Servet. She's married to Selahattin who cheats on her with Tülay.
- Derya Karadaş - Zerrin İffet- Pub belly dancer and Bünyamin's girlfriend.
- İrem Sak - Tülay- Pub Singer and Selahattin's mistress.
- Gonca Vuslateri (in two different roles) - Eylem- Orçun's gothic girlfriend / Vasfiye- Family's friend. She always says "Ne çektin be ...(name)" (What have you been through...(name).)
- Gönül Ülkü Özcan- Afife - Deniz and Bora's often stingy grandmother

== Production ==
The idea of Yalan Dünya was created when Birsel decided to purchase an office in Cihangir and met with "people, real estate agents, homeowners", after which she "immediately started writing" the scenario and created the series.

=== Promotion ===
Kanal D prepared a promotional advertisement in the form of a classifieds page within the framework of communication works for the series. In the advertisement, the characters that were to be played by all the actors in the series were introduced in a humorous language. It was also promoted on the real estate website hurriyetemlak.com with the description: "a 958 TL flat in Cihangir with a balcony, multi-purpose, furnished". On the night the series premiered on Kanal D, users used the hashtag #yalandunya on Twitter in their comments, the first time this method was used in Turkey.

=== Rating ===
The series was successful in bringing high ratings for Kanal D. As it later didn't succeed in gaining the expected ratings on Friday it was moved to Monday but this lowered the ratings more than before thus it was decided to change the broadcast day again and make modifications in the scenario. Some reported that the series would end after the 2nd season due to low ratings, but scenarist Gülse Birsel announced that it would continue for at least one more season. In May 2013, it was confirmed that the 3rd season would be made. Ministry of Culture gave a plaque of appreciation to the crew due to the publication of the series abroad and to commemorate the contributions of the cast and crew in promoting Turkey.

=== Commercials ===
The series had occasionally made visual advertisements for a number of brands when they were related to the subject of the storyline however, on 3 February 2012, the RTÜK issued a fine of 310 thousand TL for violating the legislation as one such advertisement was not in any way related to the story. The actors also became the face of many brands with the characters they played in the series.

== Release calendar ==
Season	Running date & time	Season start	Season final	Running episode numbers	Episode interval	Season year	TV channel
Season 1	Friday 20.00	13 January 2012	22 June 2012	23	1-23	2012	Kanal D
Season 2	Friday 20.00 / Monday 20.00	28 September 2012	24 June 2013	33	24-56	2012-2013	Kanal D
Season 3	Friday 20.00	27 September 2013	6 June 2014	30	57-86	2013-2014	Kanal D
Season 4	Wednesday 22.30 / 23.00	29 October 2014	19 November 2014 (Final)	4	87-90	2014	Kanal D
