= Açelya Topaloğlu =

Turkish actress

- Born: 19 November 1986 (age 39); Karşıyaka, İzmir, Turkey
- Occupation: Actress
- Years active: 2008–present

Açelya Topaloğlu (born 19 November 1986) is a Turkish actress.

== Life and career ==
Topaloğlu first became interested in dancing at a young age, and received modern dance training at Tan Sağtürk Dance Club. She briefly joined the Anadolu Ateşi dance group. As she enrolled in university, through her mother's support she participated in different plays as an actress. Between 2008 and 2009, she got musical education at MSM-Actor Studio and graduated from MSM-Conservatory with a degree in theatre studies in 2013.

In 2008, she made her television debut with a role in Aşk Yakar. In 2009, she briefly appeared in Arka Sokaklar and in 2012 joined the cast of Eve Düşen Yıldırım.

In 2015, she was cast in her first leading role in the popular rom-com series Kaçak Gelinler, portraying the character of Almila. Her international breakthrough came with the rom-com series İnadına Aşk, in which she played the role of Defne.

Topaloğlu also pursued a career on stage with roles in the plays Sersefil Müzikali, Temel İçgüdü, Tersine Dünya and Kadınlar Filler ve Saireler. In 2016, she became a judge on the contest Görevimiz Komedi. In the TV series Meryem, she portrayed the character of Derin alongside Kaçak Gelinler's co-star Furkan Andıç, which was well received by critics.

She performed different roles in sketch theatre "Güldür Güldür Show" which released on ShowTV. She played as Betüş in "Sihirli Annem" remake of hit fantasy child series (2003-2012). With Emre Altuğ, she played un "Güldür Güldür Show" and "Sihirli Annem" again.

== Filmography ==
Film
Year	Title	Role
	Beni Seviyorum	
2011	Gece Sularında İstanbul (TV film)	Nihan
2013	Arkadaşlar Arasında	Meryem
2017	Damat Takımı	Deniz
2018	Arapsaçi	Ayşen
2019	Öldür Beni Sevgilim	Gonca
2019	Cinayet Süsü	Emel Umar
2022	Nalan	Nalan
Web Series
Year	Title	Role
2021	Sihirli Annem	Betüş
Tv Series
Year	Title	Role
2008	Aşk Yakar	Belda
2010	Arka Sokaklar	Ahu Gözcü
2012	Eve Düşen Yıldırım	Sevda
2014–2015	Kaçak Gelinler	Almilla Peker (1–29)
2015–2016	İnadına Aşk	Defne Barutçu (1–32)
2017	Meryem	Derin Berker
2018	Darısı Başımıza	Rüya
Theatre
Year	Title	Role
2014	Sersefil Müzikali (Volkan Severcan Theatre)	
2019–	Güldür Güldür	Çiçek

=== Music videos ===
- 2014 - Gökhan Türkmen - "Sen İstanbulsun"

== Awards and nominations ==
Year	Award	Category	Work	Result
2016	Istanbul Gelişim University 5th Media Awards	Best TV Actress	İnadına Aşk	Won
2016	6th Ayaklı Gazete Awards	Best Actress in a Teen Drama	İnadına Aşk	Nominated
