= Şevket Çoruh =

Turkish actor (born 1973)

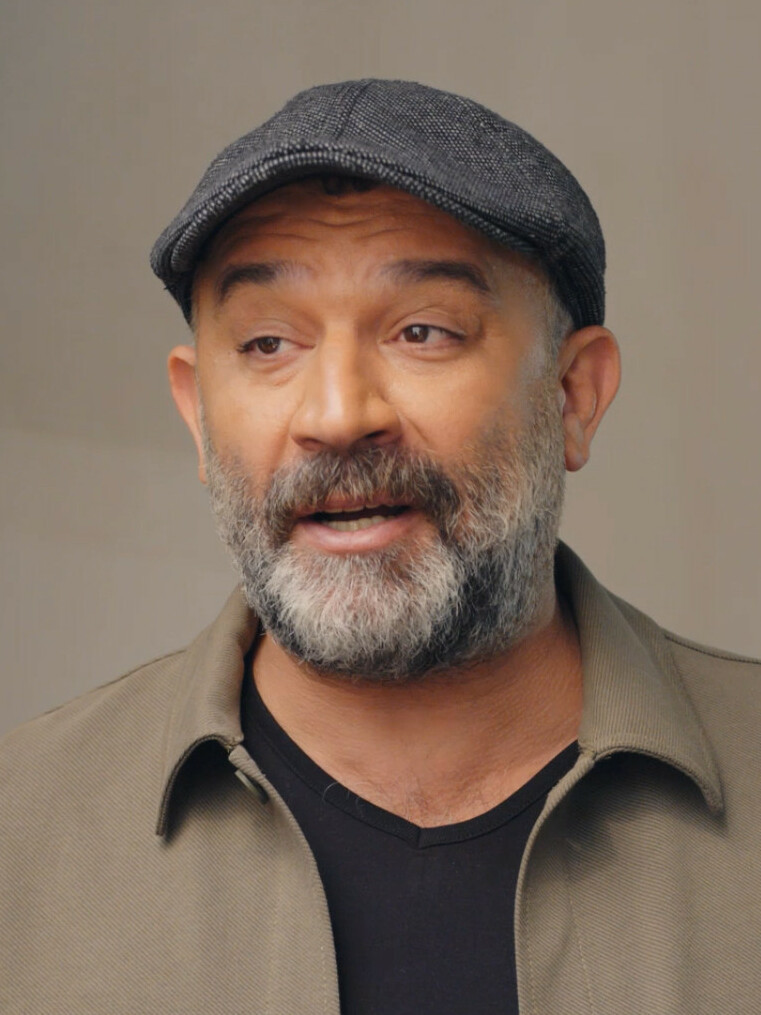
- Çoruh in 2015
- Born: June 30, 1973 (age 52); Istanbul, Turkey
- Occupation: Actor
- Years active: 1996–present
- Height: 183 cm (6 ft 0 in)
- Spouses: Günay Karacaoğlu (m. 1993; div. 2004) Özge Turna (m. 2018)
- Children: 2

Şevket Çoruh (born June 30, 1973) is a Turkish actor. After the Russo-Turkish War (1877–1878), his maternal family immigrated to Sapanca. His paternal family is from Anaçlı, Ardanuç.

He is best known for the 18-season-long police series Arka Sokaklar and the film franchises Çakallarla Dans and İnşaat. His other roles are in popular projects such as Anlat İstanbul, Gönül, Yılan Hikayesi, Çiçek Taksi, and Sultan Makamı. He graduated from Müjdat Gezen Art Center, which is one of the biggest private Turkish dance and theater education institutions. He founded the theatre "Baba Sahne".

== Filmography ==
=== Television series ===
Year	Title	Role	Notes
1996	Köşe Kapmaca		
1997–1998	Çiçek Taksi	Çamur Şevket	
1998	Affet Bizi Hocam	Bekir	
1999	Yılan Hikâyesi	Yaşar	
1999	Sevda Kondu	Rıza	
2000	Ruhsar	Newscaster	
2002	Azad	Zübeyir	
2003–2004	Sultan Makamı	Sultan	
2005	Canın Sağolsun	Tayfun	
2005	Savcının Karısı	Ünal	
2006	Gönül	Kudret	
2006–2022, 2024-	Arka Sokaklar	Mesut Güneri	Leading role
2007	Komedi Dükkanı	Himself	Guest appearance
2008	Anında Görüntü Show	Himself	Guest appearance
2010	Akasya Durağı	Himself	Guest appearance
2010	Umut Yolcuları	Mesut Güneri	Guest appearance
2012	İşler Güçler	Taxi driver	Guest appearance
2018	İkizler Memo-Can	Mesut Güneri	Guest appearance
2023	Tetikçinin Oğlu	İskender Karayurt	Leading role

=== Film ===
Year	Title	Role	Notes
2003	İnşaat	Sudi	Leading role
2004	Anlat İstanbul	Recep	
2004	Eğreti Gelin	Hasan	
2004	Bir Aşk Hikayesi	Musa	
2004	Gülizar	Pirasan	
2004	Kayıp Aşklar	Kemal	
2008	Usta	Ersun	Leading role
2009	Sonsuz	Cihan	
2010	Anı Yaşamak	Yusuf	
2010	Çakallarla Dans	Kayınço Gökhan	Leading role
2011	Anadolu Kartalları	Naci Dizdar	Supporting role
2012	Çanakkale 1915	Mehmet Çavuş	Leading role
2012	Çakallarla Dans 2: Hastasıyız Dede	Kayınço Gökhan	Leading role
2014	İnşaat 2	Sudi	Leading role
2014	Hayat Sana Güzel	Azmi Yapıcı	Leading role
2014	Çakallarla Dans 3: Sıfır Sıkıntı	Kayınço Gökhan	Leading role
2016	Çakallarla Dans 4	Kayınço Gökhan	Leading role
2017	Aile Arasında	Necdet (Neco)	
2017	Yanlış Anlama	Manager	
2018	Canavar Gibi	Gürbüz	Leading role
2018	Çakallarla Dans 5	Kayınço Gökhan	Leading role
2022	Çakallarla Dans 6	Kayınço Gökhan	Leading role

=== Streaming series ===
Year	Title	Role	Notes
2021	N Kuşağı	Himself	Guest appearance
2022	Sıcak Kafa	Anton Kadir Tarakçı	Leading role
