= Doğa Rutkay =

Turkish actress (born 1978)

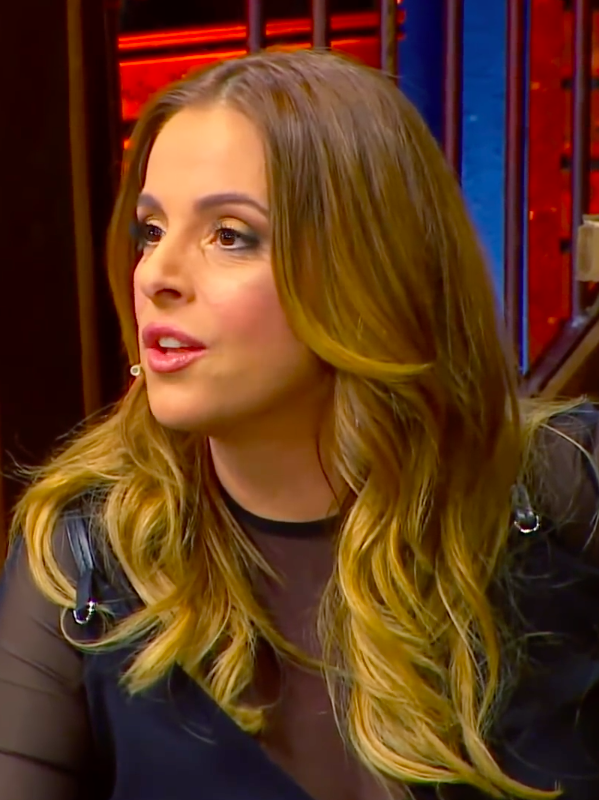
- Rutkay on Tolgshow in April 2018
- Born: 30 October 1978 (age 46); Ankara, Turkey
- Education: Mimar Sinan Fine Arts University
- Occupations: Actress; TV presenter
- Years active: 1998–present
- Spouse: Kerimcan Kamal (m. 2014)
- Children: 2
- Parents: Rutkay Aziz (father); Nuran Duru (mother)

Doğa Rutkay Kamal (born 30 October 1978) is a Turkish actress and TV presenter.

== Biography ==
She is the daughter of actor Rutkay Aziz. Her parents divorced when she was 5 years old. In 2000, she graduated from Mimar Sinan Fine Arts University State Conservatory with a degree in theatre studies. She started her career as a stage actress with roles in the plays 27 Numara, Terk and Averaj Takımı.

She also works as actor for numerous different roles on Show TV's theatrical sketch comedy Güldür Güldür Show. Between 2001-2008, she acted alongside Emel Sayın and Mehmet Ali Erbil in the popular comedy series Aşkım Aşkım as Layla.

In 1998, she made her debut on television with a role in Çiçeği Büyütmek. In 1999, Rutkay joined the cast of Çağan Irmak's sequel series Günaydın İstanbul Kardeş. Rutkay then was cast alongside Halil Ergün and Oya Aydoğan in the series Pembe Patikler, portraying the character of Zeliş.

Aside from her acting career, she has worked as a TV presenter on different channels. In 2014, she presented Kanal D program Buyur Burdan Bak. She presented talk show "Doğa Rutkay ile Herşey Bu Masada". She presented kid program "Çocuktan Al Haberi".

== Filmography ==
=== TV series ===
Year	Title	Role	Director
1994	Kurtuluş	Latife's sister	Ziya Öztan
1998	Günaydın İstanbul Kardeş	Sadenaz	Çağan Irmak
1998	Çiceği Büyütmek		Tarık Alpagut
2001	Aşkım Aşkım	Layla Uzun	Filiz Kaynak
2001	Dedem Gofret ve Ben		
2002	Pembe Patikler	Zeliş	Julide Övür
2002	Her Şey Aşk İçin		Cankat Ergin
2002	Şeytan Sofrası	Lale	Ömer Uğur
2004	Halk Düşmanı	Deniz	Erkavim Yıldırım
2005	Bendeniz Aysel	Aybike	Ebru Yalçın
2005	Dikkat Şahan Çıkabilir		
2006	Avrupa Yakası	Esra	Jale Atabey Özberk
2007	Şölen	Şölen	Cemal Kavsar
2008	Aşkım Aşkım	Layla Uzun	Nursen Esenboğa
2009	Kandıramazsın Beni		Focus Film
2014	Analı Oğullu	Herself	Beşiktaş Culture Center

=== Film ===
Year	Title	Role
1998	Cumhuriyet	Latife's sister
2004	Şans Kapıyı Kırınca	Hostes
2006	Gen	Dr. Deniz
2007	Bayrampaşa : Ben Fazla Kalmayacağım	Gelin
2007	Bir İhtimal Daha Var	Pelin
2009	Dersimiz Atatürk	Latife Hanım
2010	Pak Panter	Gülizar
2012	Patlak Sokaklar: Gerzomat	Mary Jane
2012	Süper Türk	
2012	Çakallarla Dans 2 Hastasıyız Dede	Leyla Şekerci
2013	Kral Yolu	Anne
2016	Dedemin Fişi	Pervin
2018	Bizim Köyün Şarkısı	
2023	Hava Muhafeleti	

=== TV programs ===
Year	Title
2000	50 Dakika
2002	Vaziyetler
2004	Passaparola
2004	Yaz Zamanı
2006	Işın Show
2005	Ceyhun Yılmaz Show
2005	Dikkat Şahan Çıkabilir
2008	Disko Kralı
2008	Doğayla Gece Yarısı
2008	Eğlence Pazarı
2013–	Güldür Güldür Show
2015	Buyur Burdan Bak
2017	Doğa Rutkay'la Her Şey Bu Masada
2020	Çocuktan Al Haberi
