= Barış Çakmak =

Turkish actor

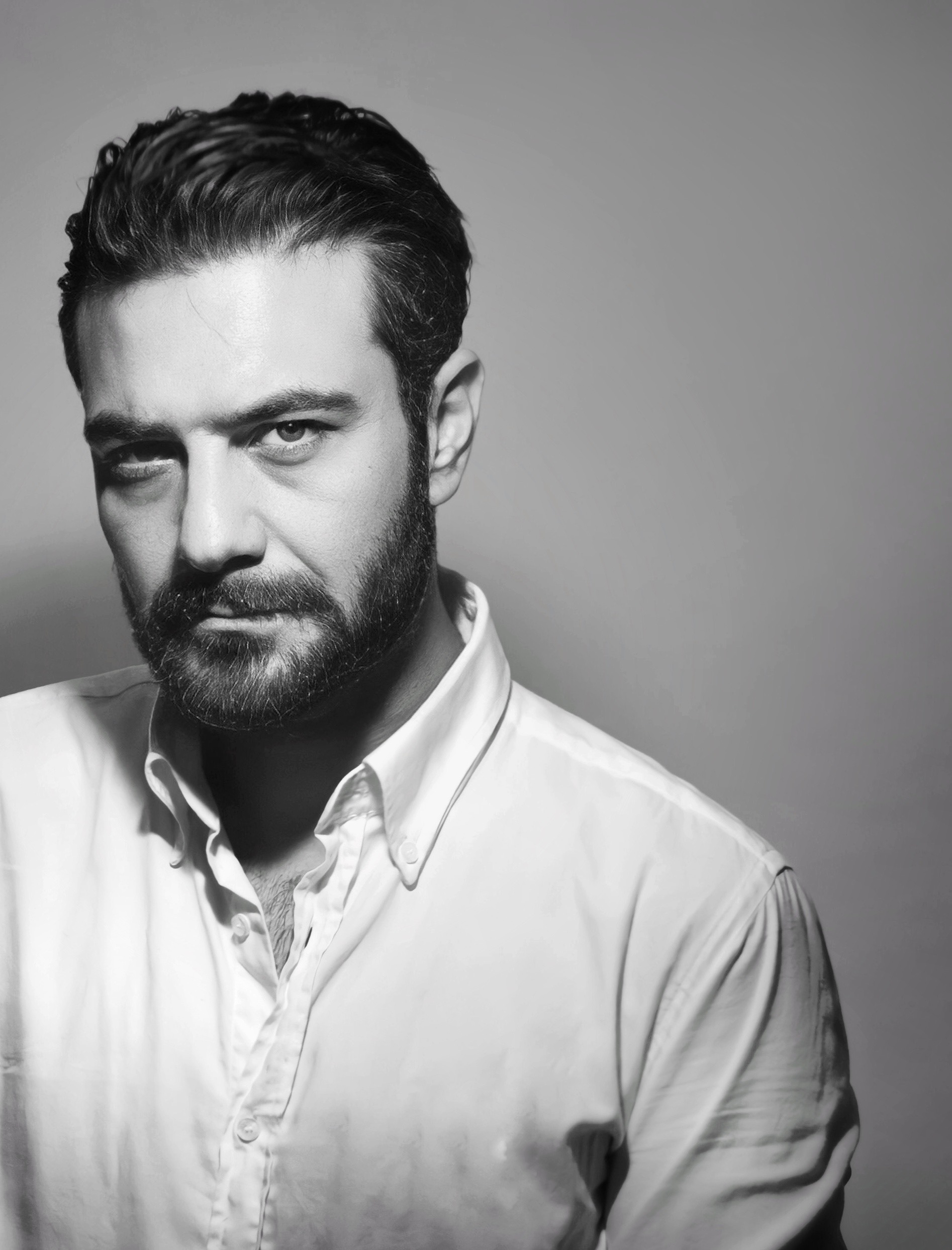
- Born: Barış Çakmak; July 5, 1979 (age 47); Gallipoli, Turkey
- Education: Kültür College; Istanbul University State Conservatory, Drama and Performing Arts; Istanbul University, Ancient Greek and Ancient Latin Language and Literature
- Occupation: Actor
- Years active: 1999–present

Barış Çakmak (born 5 July 1979) is a Turkish actor who has been involved in television series, theatre plays and films.

== Career ==
Çakmak studied Ancient Greek and Latin at Istanbul University, and graduated from the Istanbul University State Conservatory in Drama and Performing Arts in 2004. From 2002-2004, he played Osman Karacahan in the TV series Zerda. In 2007, he played Haydar in the TV series Fikrimin İnce Gülü. From 2009 to 2011, he played Selim in Hanımın Çiftliği, which was a period drama TV series based on Kemal Tahir's novel Lady's Farm. In 2012, he played Selim Aliç in Mavi Kelebekler (Blue Butterflies), a TV series about Bosnian war that was broadcast on Turkey's national network TRT.Now he plays Azad in "küçuk gelin" or "little bride"

Çakmak also participated in feature films. His debut role was Hakan in Gönderilmemiş Mektuplar (Unsent Letters), a film directed by Yusuf Kurçenli. In 2010, he took part in Mordkommission Istanbul, a movie produced by Ziegler Film Company for German TV channel ARD, and a short film The Death of Tennessee Williams in which he played the title character.

In theatre, he starred in My Name is Red, a period drama adapted from Orhan Pamuk's novel of the same name; it was produced by Goldhawk Productions and later broadcast by the BBC. He starred in a play called Korku İmparatorluğu (Fear Empire). He was involved in theatre productions for A Streetcar Named Desire and Play It Again Sam.

His voicing career includes him being the corporate identity voice-over for the company Eczacıbaşı between the years 2004–2006. He also does voice-overs for Greenpeace.

== Filmography ==
Television
Year	Title	Role	Notes
2002	Kuzenlerim (My Cousins)	Hakan	TV series
2002–2004	Zerda	Osman Karacahan	TV series
2003	Kırık Ayna (Broken Mirror)	Dirican Koçoğlu	TV series
2004	Büyük Buluşma (Big Gathering)	Necmi	TV movie
2005	Beşinci Boyut (Fifth Dimension)	Servet	TV movie
2006	Yağmurdan Sonra (After the Rain)	Tuncay	TV series
2006	Gülpare	Bulut Atahan	TV series
2007	Fikrimin İnce Gülü	Haydar	TV series
2009	Kırık Kalpler (Broken Hearts)	Çetin	TV movie
2009	Doludizgin Yıllar	Ali	TV series
2009–2011	Hanımın Çiftliği (Lady's Farm)	Selim	TV series
2011–2012	Mavi Kelebekler (Blue Butterflies)	Selim Aliç	TV series
2013	Küçük Gelin	Azad Kirman	TV series
Cinema
Year	Title	Role	Notes
2002	Gönderilmemiş Mektuplar (Unsent Letters)	Hakan	
2007	Kör Aşık (Love is Blind)	Necmi	
2008	İncir Çekirdeği (Not Worth a Fig)	Nazif	
2010	Mordkommission Istanbul	Ercan Benli	
2010	The Death of Tennessee Williams	Tennessee Williams	Short film
2012	Çanakkale 1915 Diriliş	Hūseyin Avni Bey	
2013	Kelebeğin Rüyası (Butterfly's Dream)	Oktay Rıfat	
Theatre
Year	Title	Role	Notes
2000	A Streetcar Named Desire	Allan Grey	
2001	Play It Again Sam	Humphrey Bogart	
2003	A Midsummer Night's Dream	Oberon	Northern Centre for Performance Arts, Doncaster College, High Melton, South Yorkshire, UK
2006 - 2008	Ayıp Ettik	Devrimci Yazar	
2008	My Name is Red	Hasan	BBC Radio 4, Goldhawk Production
2011-2012	Korku İmparatorluğu (Fear Empire)	Abdel Rahman el Balaa	
