= Yasemin Sakallıoğlu =

Turkish comedian (born 1988)

- Born: 22 April 1988 (age 38); Istanbul, Turkey
- Occupations: Comedian, actress
- Years active: 2014–present
- Spouse: Burak Yırtar (m. 2021)

Yasemin Sakallıoğlu (born 22 April 1988) is a Turkish comedian, screenwriter, writer, and actress.

== Life and career ==
Sakallıoğlu was born on 22 April 1988, in Istanbul, to a father from Sakarya and a mother from İkizdere, Rize. She completed her primary and secondary education in Istanbul. After completing high school, she began studying Drama and Acting at the Faculty of Fine Arts of Istanbul Aydın University in 2016, but left the program in 2019.

She began gaining recognition in 2014 by uploading impersonations of her mother to social media for entertainment purposes. After building a following, she began her professional career with the feature film Bizum Hoca. She was the first comedian to perform a stand-up show at Ülker Sports and Event Hall. She is also the first female comedian to perform at the Cemil Topuzlu Open-Air Theatre.

She married Burak Yırtar in 2021.

== Awards ==
- Hacettepe University Kristal Geyik Awards – Best Comedian of the Year
- 15th Quality Awards – Quality Female Comedian Award
- Inflow Awards – Best Instagram Influencer

== Filmography ==
Year	Production	Type	Role	Notes
2014	Bizum Hoca	Film		
2015	Eşkıya Dünyaya Hükümdar Olmaz	Television series	Lütfiye	
2018	Jet Sosyete	Television series	Kumsal	
2020	Zengo	Film	Zerrin	First screenplay written by Yasemin Sakallıoğlu
2021	İlginç Bazı Olaylar	Television series	Zerrin	Guest appearance
2023	Mutluyuz	Film	Aslı	
2024	Bahar	Television series	Muhtar Hasibe	Guest appearance
2024	Doğru Koca Nasıl Seçilir	Stand-up		
2025–present	Gassal	Television series		Guest appearance
2026	Mutluyuz Mu?	Film	Aslı	Lead role
Upcoming	Düğün Şarkıcısı	Film	Şahnaz	Lead role

== Works ==
- Dış Güzellik Yasaklansın Ruh Güzelliğine Geçelim – 2021
