= Sagopa Kajmer =

Turkish rapper, record producer, and DJ

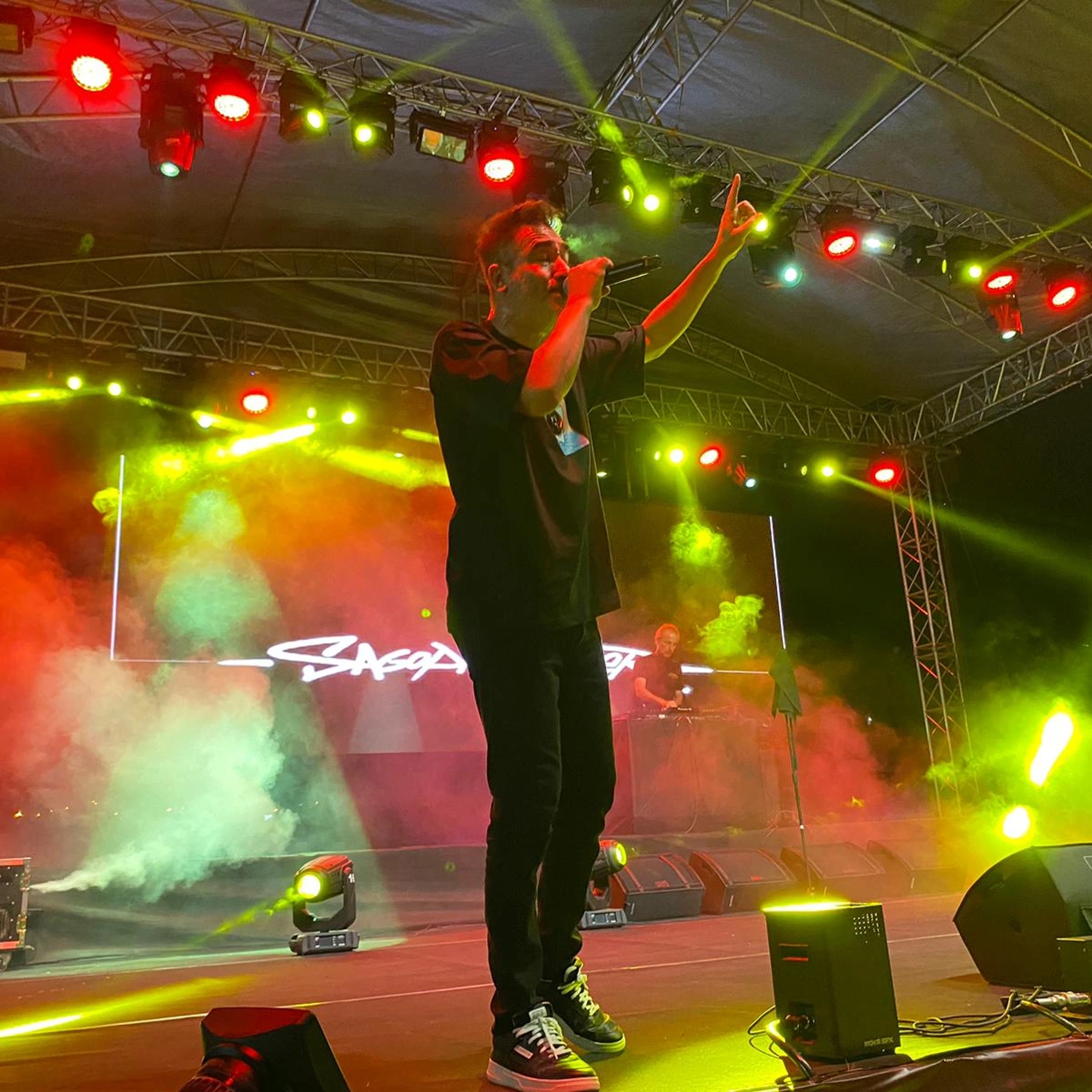
- Sagopa Kajmer in September 2023
- Born: Yunus Özyavuz; 17 August 1978 (age 48); Samsun, Turkey
- Education: Istanbul University; Persian Language and Literature
- Occupations: Rapper; singer; record producer; DJ; songwriter
- Spouse: Kolera (Esen Güler) (m. 2006; div. 2017)
- Musical career
- Also known as: DJ Mic Check; Silahsız Kuvvet
- Genre: Hip hop
- Instruments: Turntable; drum; piano
- Years active: 1996–present
- Label: Melankolia Müzik
- Website: melankolia.com.tr

Yunus Özyavuz (born 17 August 1978), better known by his stage name Sagopa Kajmer (Turkish: [sɑgopɑ kɑʒmæɾ]) or formerly known as DJ Mic Check and Silahsız Kuvvet (lit. 'Unarmed Force'), is a Turkish rapper, singer, songwriter, record producer, and DJ. He is the first and only rapper to have given concerts in all of 81 provinces of Turkey.

He was born in 1978 in Samsun and finished his primary and high school there. He then started working as a DJ in one of Samsun's local radio stations. In order to continue his education, he moved to Istanbul and studied Persian language and literature at Istanbul University. He claims his early musical influences were the African music of his father and the Italian music of his mother.

In 1998, he founded the hip hop band Kuvvetmira and started his career with his stage name "Silahsız Kuvvet". He featured in the compilation album Yeraltı Operasyonu as Silahsız Kuvvet in 1999. He later changed his stage name to Sagopa Kajmer and released an album with the same name Sagopa Kajmer in 2002. Following the release of the album, he released Bir Pesimistin Gözyaşları in 2004. Same year, he contributed to the soundtrack for the movie G.O.R.A.. He released another studio album Romantizma in 2005 and on 11 August 2005 found his own production company Melankolia Müzik. In 2006, he released the compilation album Kafile under the label Melankolia Müzik. On 1 August 2006, he married fellow rapper Kolera (Esen Güler). In 2007, they released their first mutual album İkimizi Anlatan Bir Şey. He released two more solo albums, Kötü İnsanları Tanıma Senesi (2008) and Şarkı Koleksiyoncusu (2009), before releasing another mutual album with Kolera, Bendeki Sen, in 2010. Since then, he has released four studio albums: Saydam Odalar (2011), Kalp Hastası (2013), Ahmak Islatan (2017) and Kağıt Kesikleri (2022).

== Career ==
=== 1978–2002: Early life and career beginnings ===
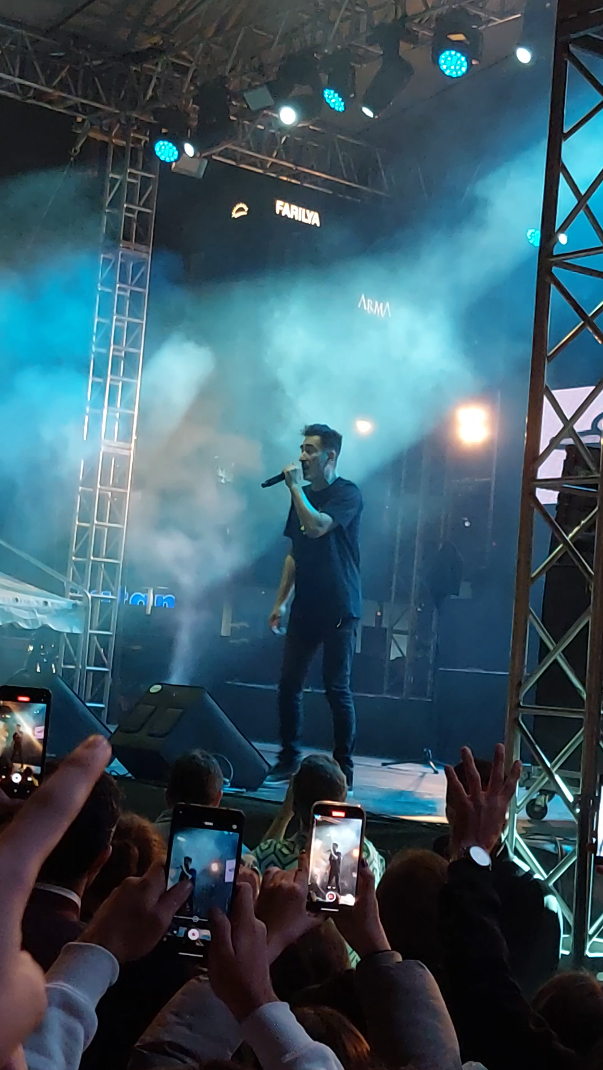
Sagopa Kajmer giving a concert in Ankara on 23 September 2022

Yunus Özyavuz was born on 17 August 1978 in Samsun. He finished primary and high school in Samsun. In his own words, his interest in music rose after listening to African music by his mother, and Italian music by his father. He started his music career by working as a DJ in one of Samsun's local radio stations. During that period, he used the name DJ Rapper M.C. (DJ Rapper Mic Check). In 1997, he moved to Istanbul to continue his education and studied Persian language and literature at Istanbul University. He graduated 4 years later.

In 1998, he founded the rap group Kuvvetmira. In 1999, he featured in the compilation album Yeraltı Operasyonu as Silahsız Kuvvet. At the same time, he released another album, Gerilim 99 (Promo). In the same month, he released his first EP Pesimist EP 1. In 2000, together with Ceza, he released the album Toplama Kampı. One year later, he released another album Sözlerim Silahım. At the same time period he also released One Second. In 2002, he released the studio album İhtiyar Heyeti, and produced Ceza's album Med Cezir. At the same, he released the album Sagopa Kajmer, which was followed by On Kurşun.

=== 2003–2009: Bir Pesimistin Gözyaşları, Romantizma, İkimizi Anlatan Bir Şey and Kötü İnsanları Tanıma Senesi ===
In 2004, he gave an interview to Radikal in which he said that after 7 years of using the stage name Silahsız Kuvvet, he would use the stage name Sagopa Kajmer from now on. In the same year, he produced the album Rapstar and appeared alongside Ceza on the music video for "Neyim Var Ki". In June 2003, his new album, Bir Pesimistin Gözyaşları, was released by Hammer Müzik and turned the songs "Maskeli Balo" and "Karikatür Komedya" from the album into music videos. In 2004, he produced Dr. Fuchs's album Huzur N Darem. Later, he made the music for Cem Yılmaz's comedy film G.O.R.A.. On 19 August 2005, he released the album Romantizma under the label İrem Records and later turned the song "Vasiyet" into a music video. The music video for "Vasiyet" won the Best Video Clip award at the 12th Kral TV Video Music Awards in 2005. In the same year, he released Pesimist EP 3. To produce his own albums and to open doors for new opportunities, on 11 August 2005 Kajmer opened Melankolia Müzik together with Kolera. Together with other members of Kuvvetmira, Sagopa Kajmer released the album Kafile in which he was the producer of 1 January 2006 under the label Melankolia Müzik. On 18 May 2006, he released Pesimist EP 4 - Kurşun Asker, in which the last two songs are in English and belong to Ewren, on his website.

On 26 April 2007, he released his first mutual album with Kolera, İkimizi Anlatan Bir Şey. In 2008, his solo album Kötü İnsanları Tanıma Senesi was released alongside two music videos for the songs "Ben Hüsrana Komşuyum" and "Düşersem Yanarım". On 6 May 2008, he released the single "Bu Şarkıyı Zevk İçin Yaptık", which featured Kolera. On 27 December 2008, he released Pesimist EP 5 - Kör Cerrah on his official website. In 2009, he released the songs from his previous EPs in a compilation album, titled Şarkı Koleksiyoncusu, on 19 February. On 1 April 2009, he released the single "Beslenme Çantam" as a duet with Kolera. On 18 July 2009, he released another single with Kolera, "Hain".

=== 2010–2021: Bendeki Sen, Saydam Odalar and Kalp Hastası ===
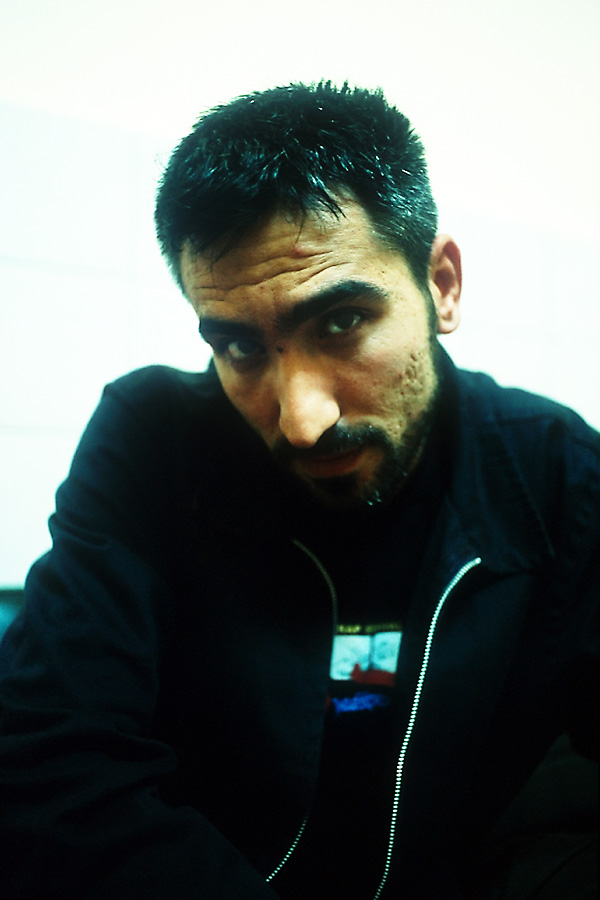
Sagopa Kajmer in 2006

In 2010, he released his second mutual album with Kolera, Bendeki Sen, from which the songs "Bir Dizi İz" and "Merhametine Dön" were turned into music videos. Bendeki Sen was nominated for the Best Album award at the TRT Music Awards, which was based on people's votes. In 2010, he also produced Kafile 2. On 4 February 2010, he released the single "Ardından Bakarım". In 2011, he released the album Saydam Odalar, the songs "Kaç Kaçabilirsen" and "Bu İşlerden Elini Çek" in the album featured Kolera, with a music video being made for "Kaç Kaçabilirsen". In 2013, he announced on his Twitter account that he was working on a new album. Sagopa Kajmer organized a tour with Pesimist Orchestra during March, April and May 2013 and gave concerts in 15 different cities. On 8 July 2013, his new album Kalp Hastası was released and Kolera was again featured on the song "İster İstemez". One day before the album's release, Sagopa Kajmer released the song "Düşünmek İçin Vaktin Var" on internet together with a music video. This song was later added to Sagopa Kajmer's album Kalp Hastası. Two weeks after the release of the album, a music video was released for the song "Uzun Yollara Devam" as a successor to the clip for "Düşünmek İçin Vaktin Var". In the early months of 2014, the production process for his new EP Pesimist EP 6 began and it was released on 20 March 2014.

On 6 May 2014, together with Birol Giray (BeeGee), he released the song "Abrakadabra" free of charge on internet. He also composed Cem Adrian's song "Artık Bitti" and served as a backing vocalist on it. In the early months of 2015, he shared the beats for some of his songs on YouTube and released the beats for his 1998-2001 songs under the name Underground Years on the platform. On 17 June 2015, his new song, "Bilmiyorum", was released on YouTube. On 12 November 2015, his second mutual work with Birol Giray "Naber" was released together with a music video. In March 2016, it was announced on his official website that he was working on a new song, titled "Tecrübe", together DJ Tarkan. On 31 December 2016, his song "366.Gün" was released on Koleraflow YouTube channel. In 2017, he released "Ne Kaybederdin" on his official YouTube channel. On 23 August 2017, Sagopa Kajmer announced on his official Twitter account that he was working on a new album and on 1 September 2017 Ahmak Islatan was released. On 31 December 2017, he released a new song "Sorun Var" on his YouTube channel, of which he released the music video of on 29 May 2018 on YouTube. On 25 September 2018, Sagopa Kajmer announced on his Instagram account that his new song would be released on 2 October on digital platforms, and one day prior to that on YouTube. On 1 October 2018, "Oldu Olanlar" was released on YouTube. On his 41st birthday, he released the song "Avutsun Bahaneler". On 29 November 2019, Sagopa Kajmer released the EP Sarkastik. A music video was also released for its lead single "Toz Taneleri". An investigation was started by legal authorities following complaints by the public on the grounds that he encouraged people to smoke by smoking in the music video of the song "Toz Taneleri" published on YouTube. He later gave a statement to the Istanbul Chief Public Prosecutor's Office within the scope of the investigation.

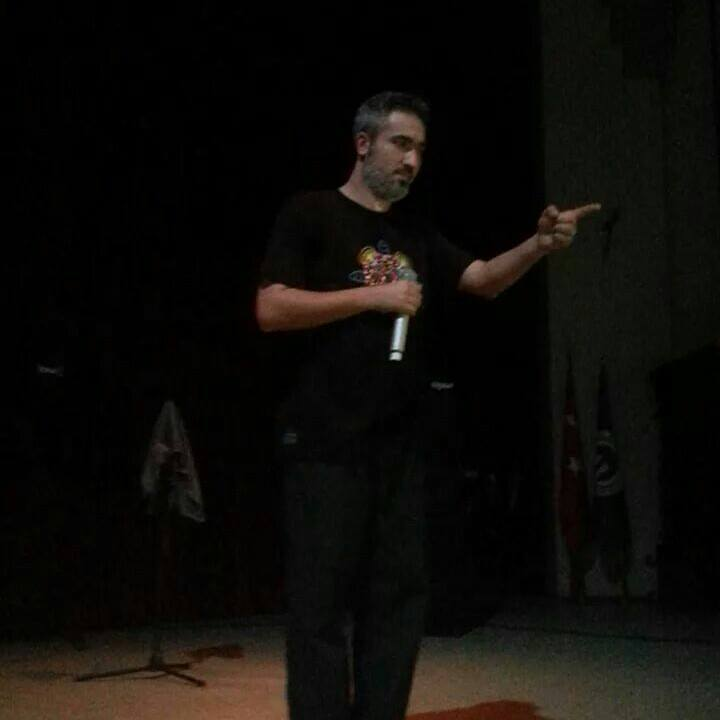
Sagopa Kajmer at his 2014 Trabzon concert

On 12 June 2020, he released the song "Siyah", featuring Patron. The music video of the song was shared on Patron's official YouTube account. On 17 July 2020, Sagopa Kajmer released the song "Bu Sen Değilsin" with Faruk Sabancı on his YouTube channel. On August 17, 2020, he released the album "Yunus EP" with the Melankolia Music label. On February 19, 2021, he released the album "Tek" (lit. Single), in which he compiled and removed the parts his former spouse Kolera sang in their duets with between the years 2005 and 2011. On 7 May 2021, he announced on his official Twitter account that his single "Saldırground" was released. On November 11, 2022, he released the song "Onlarla Konuşuyorum" with Defkhan. The song's official music video was uploaded to Defkhan's YouTube account. On 1 July 2021, he released the single "Kim", which he recorded 2018.

=== 2022-present: Kağıt Kesikleri ===
On June 2, 2022, he released the album Kağıt Kesitleri. The first music video for the album was shot for the song "Bla Bla Bla Bla Bla", a duet with Şehinşah. On 22 September 2023, he released the song "Geceler", a duet with Mine Koşan. On November 15, 2023, he released the song "İstesem de Söyleyemem".

== Artistry ==
=== Music style ===
Sagopa Kajmer is a rap music artist. He started his career under the name Silahsız Kuvvet and later used elements of Anatolian melodies and türküs in his songs. Although he initially used curse words in the album Sagopa Kajmer, he later refrained from using them later in his career. He also performed his songs in a tone different than his actual voice to not become famous. His voice is thought to be of Arabesque style. In his 2003 album, Romantizma, there are far more love themes than his previous works.

=== Influences ===
Run-DMC's music was influential in forming Kajmer's rap music. He said that he was influenced by the works of Omar Khayyam, Ferdowsi and Rumi. In an interview with Pembe Newspaper, he said: "When I was little I thought I was Jam Master Jay from Run-DMC. LL Cool J and Fat Boys are also very important names. I got my influence from them." The artist's style change and beard gave rise to the rumors that he was influenced by the philosophy of Ahmet Mahmut Ünlü. The artist, however, firmly denied these allegations and said that it was only after reading a hadith that he decided to let his beard grow.

== Meaning of 'Sagopa Kajmer' ==
Yunus Özyavuz explains the meaning of Sagopa Kajmer with these words:

It's an ancient pyramid in Egypt... and the one who's looking for it is Kajmer. So, the one who's trying to look for something or solve it is trying to find his Sagopa's like Kajmer... one who solves his issues.

On Beyazıt Öztürk and Meral Okay's program Nasıl Yani he said:

A scientist doing research in pyramids in Egypt... all the coordination inside is written in hieroglyph, and then he loses his life during his search. Scientists who came after him discovered that the man who originally found the pyramid, as they read from the papyrus, was a man named Kajmer who discovered the Pyramid of Sagopa. I read this article in my college years.

On 17 November 2015, in response to Mesut Yar's question "What does it mean?" he said:

Mystery ... There is also a tree named Sago in Thailand. A nice palm type. Kajmer means child. Troubled child... This is also of a bit of eastern origin in Avesta.

== Personal life ==
His mother is Serpil Özyavuz, and his father is Mehmet Özyavuz. He also has a brother named Emre Özyavuz. He is a graduate of Persian language and literature from Istanbul University. On 1 August 2006, he married fellow rapper Esen Güler (known as Kolera). On 20 November 2017, they announced on their Instagram accounts that they had divorced after 11 years of marriage., with Güler alleging that he physically abused her. In May 2018, in response to one of his followers on social media who asked "what is your religious belief" he said "I have no religious beliefs", although it was previously reported that he was connected to religious groups. . Kajmer has previously filed complaints against fellow rappers such as Ceza, his sister, and Fuat Ergin for Insulting him in their tracks and concerts.

He is a supporter of the Turkish Super League side Samsunspor.

His mother, Serpil Özyavuz, died on June 2, 2024 due to lung cancer.

=== Illegal drug use ===
On 18 July 2013, Özyavuz was taken into custody for allegedly ordering marijuana seeds from the UK. According to reports, Özyavuz went to a post office to pick up an order sent from England. A post office staff member called the police after becoming suspicious of the package which contained 100 DVDs in 5 DVD cases and when Özyavuz realized that police were informed, he fled the scene and went home. Responding to claims on his Twitter account, Özyavuz stated that he ordered carnivorous plants and many tropical plant seeds without reading the customs law and asked his fans to not believe "rumors" about him, also stating that he had no bad intentions, he said, "If what I did constitutes a crime, I regret it."

Units from the Istanbul Customs Enforcement Directorate seized the package and raided Özyavuz's house with permission from the Istanbul Chief Public Prosecutor's Office. The teams who examined the packages found a total of 560 grams of cannabis plants out of 5 DVD cases. He was taken into custody and a lawsuit was filed against him with the demand of imprisonment from 5 years to 15 years for "trafficking or supplying drugs or stimulants" and from 1 year to 2 years for "using drugs" by the Bakırköy Chief Public Prosecutor's Office. He was later brought to the Haseki Research and Training Hospital for a health check to then be taken to Bakırköy Courthouse and released shortly after on judicial controls. As a result, Özyavuz was banned from leaving the country.

== Awards and nominations ==
In 2002, Sagopa won the best DJ award of 2001. In the following year he won the Best DJ award again, however he refused to attend the awards night. The organisation claimed Sagopa criticised such organisations, however it might be due to Sagopa's friendship with Fuat Ergin, who was hostile to Barikat, the rap group that organised the organisation of that year.

On 20 April 2005, during the last day of the famous Karabiber Tour in Sakarya, Sagopa won several awards that day; 'Best Male Rap/Hip-Hop Artist of 2004', 'Best DJ of 2004', 'Best Album of 2004' and 'Best Song of 2004', his then girlfriend Kolera also won the 'Best Female Rap/Hip-Hop Artist of 2004'.

On 11 May 2006, at Kral TV Video Music Awards, the music video for his song "Vasiyet" was awarded for the best music video. He was also nominated as the Best Turkish Act at the 2008 MTV Europe Music Awards. His mutual album with Kolera Bendeki Sen, was nominated as the best album at TRT Music Awards with the votes of people.

Year	Organisation	Category	Nominee	Result
2002	Boys of the Sun 2001 Awards	Best DJ of 2001	Himself	Won
2003	Boys of the Sun 2002 Awards	Best DJ of 2002	Himself	Won
2005	Boğaziçi University Radyo Rap Music Awards of 2004	Best Male Rap/Hiphop Artist of the Year	Himself	Won
2005	Boğaziçi University Radyo Rap Music Awards of 2004	Best Album of 2004	Bir Pesimistin Gözyaşları	Won
2005	Boğaziçi University Radyo Rap Music Awards of 2004	Best Song of 2004	Neyim var ki?	Won
2005	Boğaziçi University Radyo Rap Music Awards of 2004	Best DJ of 2004	Himself	Won
2006	Kral TV Video Music Awards	Best Video Clip	"Vasiyet"	Won
2008	MTV Europe Music Awards	Best Rapper of Türkiye of the Year	Himself	Nominated
2011	TRT Music Awards	Best Album of the Year	Bendeki Sen	Nominated
2019	Magazin.com Awards	Best Rap Artist of the Year	Himself	Won
2019	Yeditepe Dilek Awards	Best Song	"Avutsun Bahaneler"	Won

== Reception ==
Fuat Ergin has said about Sagopa Kajmer: "He's not a rapper. I'm a rapper, Ceza is a rapper but he is not ... He's a branch of Arabesque." Erol Köse described Sagopa Kajmer as a "hidden star". Akşam's columnist Çağla Gürsoy said about him: "Sagopa's name appeared as one of the rap geniuses in Turkey from the beginning. I like both his style and his music." For the list of "50 People That Make You Happy", Esquire magazine described Sagopa Kajmer as a person who "brought a new breath to the rap music culture in Turkey."

== Discography ==
Studio albums

- Yeraltı Operasyonu (1999)
- Gerilim 99 (Promo) (1999)
- Sözlerim Silahım (2001)
- On Kurşun (2001)
- Tek Hayalim (2002)
- İhtiyar Heyeti (2002)
- One Second (2002)
- Sagopa Kajmer (2002)
- Bir Pesimistin Gözyaşları (2004)
- Romantizma (2005)
- İkimizi Anlatan Bir Şey (2007)
- Kötü İnsanları Tanıma Senesi (2008)
- Bendeki Sen (2010)
- Saydam Odalar (2011)
- Kalp Hastası (2013)
- Kağıt Kesikleri (2022)

Compilation albums

- Pesimist - 10 Kurşun (2001)
- Kuvvetmira Mixtape Vol.1 (2004) - with Kuvvetmira
- Kuvvetmira Mega Mixtape (2007) - with Kuvvetmira
- Compilation Vol.1 (2007)
- Compilation Vol.2 (2008?)
- Compilation Vol.3 (2008)
- Şarkı Koleksiyoncusu (2009)
- Underground Years (2015)
- Ahmak Islatan (2017)
- Tek (2021)

Duet albums

- Toplama Kampı (2000) (with Ceza as 'Asya Sentez')
- Kafile (2006) - with Kuvvetmira
- İkimizi Anlatan Bir Şey (2007) - with Kolera
- Bendeki Sen (2010) - with

Kolera

- Kafile 2 (2010) - with Kuvvetmira

EPs

- Pesimist EP 1 (2000)
- Pesimist EP 2 (2002)
- Pesimist EP 3 (2005)
- Disstortion EP (2005)
- Pesimist EP 4 - Kurşun Asker (2006)
- Pesimist EP 5 - Kör Cerrah (2008)
- Saykodelik EP (2009)
- Pesimist EP 6 - Ahmak Islatan (2014)
- Sarkastik EP (2019)
- Yunus EP (2020)

Singles

- "İçimdeki Düşman" [(1998) (Originally part of an unreleased mixtape by Suikast.de)]
- "Dört Tarafım Yalan" (2001)
- "Köle Gibi" (ft Ceza, Dr.Fuchs, Mista Brown) (2003)
- "Yalanlar" (ft IQ, 2003)
- "Filmin Son Karesi" (ft. Dr.Fuchs) (2003)
- "Kuduz Rap" (ft IQ, 2004)
- "Nedense" (ft Dr.Fuchs) (2004)
- "Durma Hadi Sek Goo" (ft IQ, 2005)
- "Köle Gibi (Remix)" (ft Dr.Fuchs, Mista Brown, Alper Tunga) (2004)
- "Boom" (ft. Derin Darbe) (2004)
- "Mistake" (ft. Toolz) (2004)
- "Uğurla Bahtiyarları (Nokia Version)" (2004)
- "Linguistiks" (ft. SHI360) (2005)
- "Yağmur" (ft. Domination) (2005)
- "Yağmur (Nokia Supersound Remix)" (ft. Domination) (2005)
- "Kambur Kelimat" (ft. Toolz) (2005)
- "3 Sefil Şair" (ft. Derin Darbe) (2005)
- "You Never Know" (2006)
- "Kırık Çocuk" (2007)
- "Bu Şarkıyı Zevk İçin Yaptık" (ft. Kolera) (2008)
- "Beslenme Çantam" (2009)
- "Hain" (2009)
- "Ardından Bakarım" (2010)
- "Istakoz" (2012)
- "40" (2012)
- "Ultimate" (ft. SHI360) (2012)
- "Düşünmek İçin Vaktin Var" (2013)
- "Abrakadabra" (2014)
- "Bilmiyorum" (2015)
- "Naber" (2015)
- "Tecrübe" (2016)
- "366.Gün" (2016)
- "Ne Kaybederdin" (2017)
- "Sertlik Kanında Var Hayatın" (2017)
- "Sorun Var" (2017)
- "Serbest" (2018)
- "Oldu Olanlar" (2018)
- "Yirmi Dört (Re-Vocal Version)" (ft. Dj Funky C) (2019)
- "Güvensiz İnsanlar" (2019)
- "Avutsun Bahaneler" (2019)
- "Siyah" (ft. Patron) (2020)
- "Bu Sen Değilsin" (ft. Faruk Sabancı) (2020)
- "Onca Şeyin Ardından" (2021)
- "Saldırground" (2021)
- "Kim" (2021)
- "Onlarla Konuşuyorum" (2022)
- "İstesem de Söyleyemem" (2023)

Unreleased or lost singles

- "Kuvvet Ritimlerde" ( Unknown Date, most likely 1998)
- "Booyaka!" (1998)
- "Hadi Sar Yak İç Lanet" (1998)
- "Dergahın Kapıları" (ft Bab-ı Dergah, 1999)
- "Düşmanım İnsan" (1999)
- "Fahişe" (1999)
- "Kuvvetten Size" (1999)
- "Selamlarım Hepinize" (1999)
- "Bir Damla Su" (ft Sözlü Taarruz, 2000)
- "Rap'in Devleri" (ft Sirhot & Ceza, 2001)
- "Rap Hediye" (ft Sirhot & Ceza, 2001)
- "Aynı Düşünceler" (Visible on the tracklist of 'Pesimist - 10 Kurşun', 2001)
- "Sagopa Kajmer" (Visible on the tracklist of 'Pesimist - 10 Kurşun', 2001)
- "Unnamed Fuat Ergin Diss" (2001)
- "Burası Neresi?" (2002)
- "Savaşım Sözlerimde" (2002)
- "yok olmak isteyen var mı?" (2002)
- "Hayatın Gerçekleri" (2002)
- "Bling Bling Hiphop" (Diss to Eminem, 2004)
- "Adult Hitler" (Diss to Pornographical Content, 2004)
- Baytar Original Version (2005)

Unreleased albums

- "Toplama Kampı 2" (with Ceza as 'Asya Sentez', 2001 or 2002)
- "Kuvvetmira International" (2002) (Kuvvetmira Compilation Album)
- Kuvvetmira Compilation (2004)
- DJ Mic Check Compilation Promo (2004)
- "Series vol.1" (with Mista Brown, 2002)
- "Silahsız Kuvvet 3" (2003 or 2004)
- "1000 Fit - Romantizma 2" (2005)

Non-Rap Albums (House Musics as 'DJ Rawkid')

- DeepTripp (2009)
- MellowTripp (2010)
- Darkomania Vol. 1 & 2 (2010)
- Mine is Groove (2010)
- Special Tribute (as DJ Mic Check)
- Forbidden Love (2019) (as Lullaby Fly)
