= The Republic (film) =

- Directed by: Ziya Öztan
- Written by: Turgut Özakman
- Starring: Rutkay Aziz; Savaş Dinçel
- Release date: 30 October 1998
- Running time: 150 minutes
- Country: Turkey
- Language: Turkish

The Republic (Turkish: Cumhuriyet) is a 1998 Turkish historical film directed by Ziya Öztan. The film follows the political and historical events of the first years of the Republic of Turkey (1922–1933) and looks at the private life of Mustafa Kemal Atatürk.

== Cast ==
- Rutkay Aziz as Mustafa Kemal Atatürk
- Savaş Dinçel as İsmet İnönü
- Hülya Aksular as Fikriye Hanım
- Dolunay Soysert as Latife Hanım
- Yeşim Alıç as Mevhibe İnönü
- Ayda Aksel as Halide Edip Adıvar
- Macide Tanır as Zübeyde Hanım
- Tarık Günersel as Salih Bozok
