= Araf (film) =

2006 Turkish film directed by Biray Dalkıran

- Directed by: Biray Dalkiran
- Written by: Hakan Bilir; Biray Dalkiran
- Produced by: Biray Dalkiran
- Cinematography: Askin Sagiroglu
- Edited by: Hüseyin Biçe
- Music by: Hayko Cepkin
- Release date: October 6, 2006
- Running time: 97 minutes
- Country: Turkey
- Language: Turkish

Araf (English: The Abortion) is a 2006 Turkish film directed by Biray Dalkiran.

== Credits ==
- Country: Turkey
- Genre: Thriller

== Synopsis ==
Inspired by Japanese horror movies, the movie tells the story of Eda (Akasya Aslitürkmen), a dancer who fell in love with Cihan (Kubilay Tunçer), her married lover. When she realized that she was four months pregnant, she thought that an abortion would solve the problem. On the same night that her dance academy mate Oya (Deniz Soyarslan) made the solo show instead of her, Eda had an illegal abortion, risking her life. Three years later she marries a photographer, Cenk (Murat Yıldırım). When she gets pregnant again, the ghost of the fetus from the abortion comes to haunt her.

== Reception ==
The film was "shunned" for both its overtly misogynistic tones, poor directing, and sloppy script.
