= Ayta Sözeri =

Turkish actress and singer

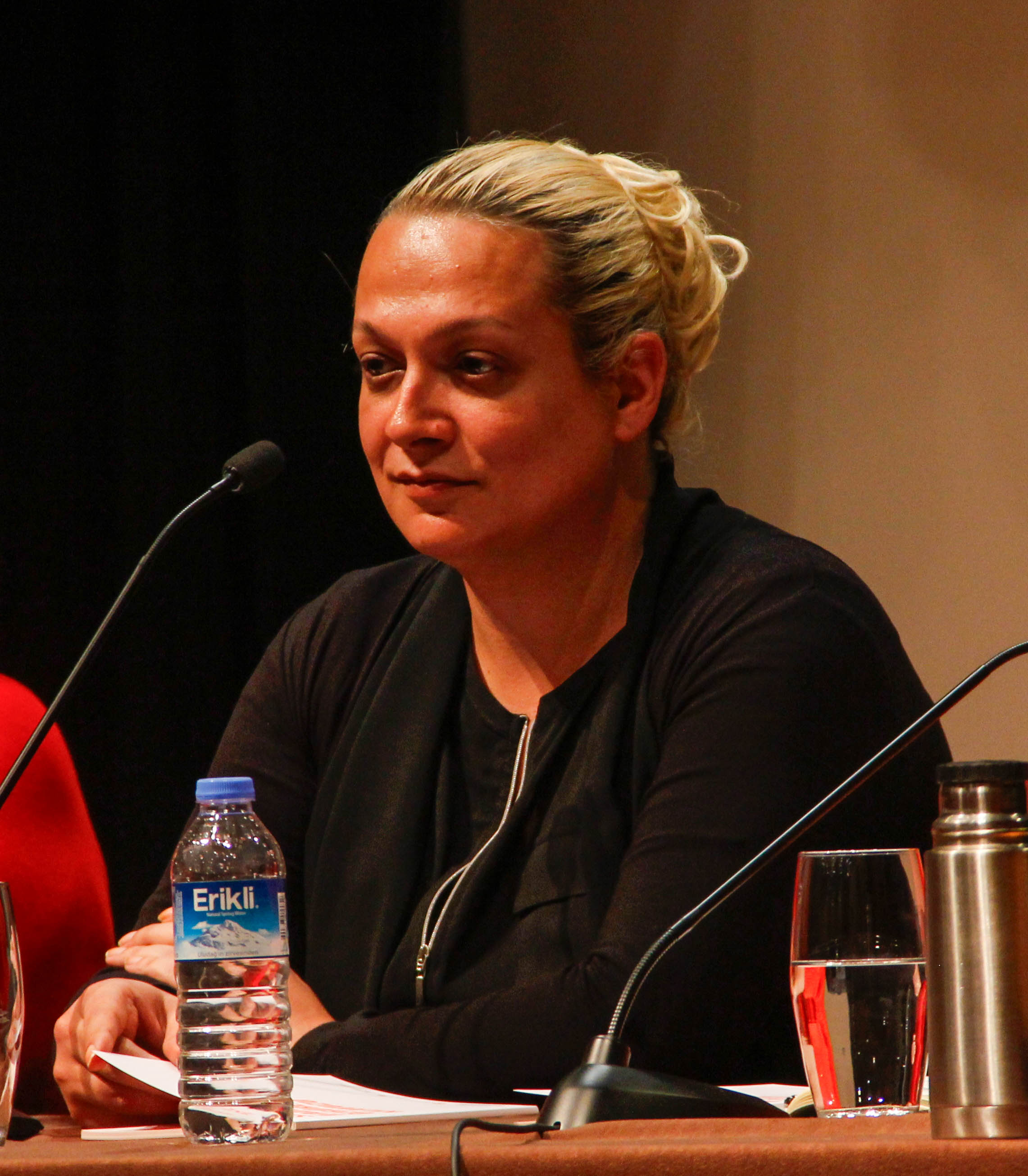
- Born: 31 March 1976 (age 50); West Germany
- Education: Ege University; Dokuz Eylül University
- Occupations: Actress, singer
- Years active: 2000–present

Ayta Sözeri (born 31 March 1976) is a Turkish actress, singer and LGBT activist.

== Biography ==
Sözeri was born on 31 March 1976 in West Germany. Her mother was of Circassian descent. Her family settled in İzmir in 1982 and she underwent sex reassignment surgery at the age of 20. She graduated from the Ege University Business Administration Department and took Turkish classical music at Dokuz Eylül University. Later she started performing as a backing vocalist for a number of artists, including Sezen Aksu.

== Filmography ==
Movies
Year	Title	Role	Notes
2009	Güneşi Gördüm	Tuana	
2009	Teslimiyet	Aygül	
2010	Kukuriku (Kadın Krallığı)	Beton	
2016	Koca Dünya	Prostitute	
2017	Aile Arasında	Behiye	
2020	Eltilerin Savaşı	Ebe	
2022	Yılbaşı Gecesi	Eftalya	
Television
Year	Title	Role	Notes
2000	Dadı	Singer	
2000	Hayat Bağları	Prison Director	
2006	Arka Sokaklar	Aydan	Guest appearance
2007	Kuzey Rüzgârı	Okşan	
2007	Dudaktan Kalbe	Convict	Guest appearance
2008	Dudaktan Kalbe	Convict	Guest appearance
2009	Akasya Durağı	Naciye, Zümrüt	
2009	Kahramanlar	Arzu	
2010	Parmaklıklar Ardında	Convict	
2011	Papatyam	Şebnem	
2012	Acayip Hikayeler	Cansu	
2012	Kayıp Şehir	Duygu	
2014	Ulan Istanbul	Umay	
2015	Paramparça	Nezaket	
2021	Yeşilçam	Kuvvet	Guest appearance
2021	İlk ve Son	Abla	Guest appearance
2021–2022	Kırmızı Oda	Zekiye Keklik	Guest starring

== Discography ==
Singles

- "Büklüm Büklüm" (2018)
- "Yanayım Yanayım" (2018)
- "Gülü Susuz Seni Aşksız Bırakmam" (Aşkın'ın Şarkıları) (2019)
- "Rustik" (ft. Uraz Kaygılaroğlu) (Eltilerin Savaşı soundtrack) (2020)
- "Anılarıma Yazık" (2020)

== Awards ==
- 50th Cinema Writers Association Awards, Best Supporting Actress Performance, Aile Arasında, 2018
