= Gülse Birsel =

Turkish actress and screenwriter (born 1971)

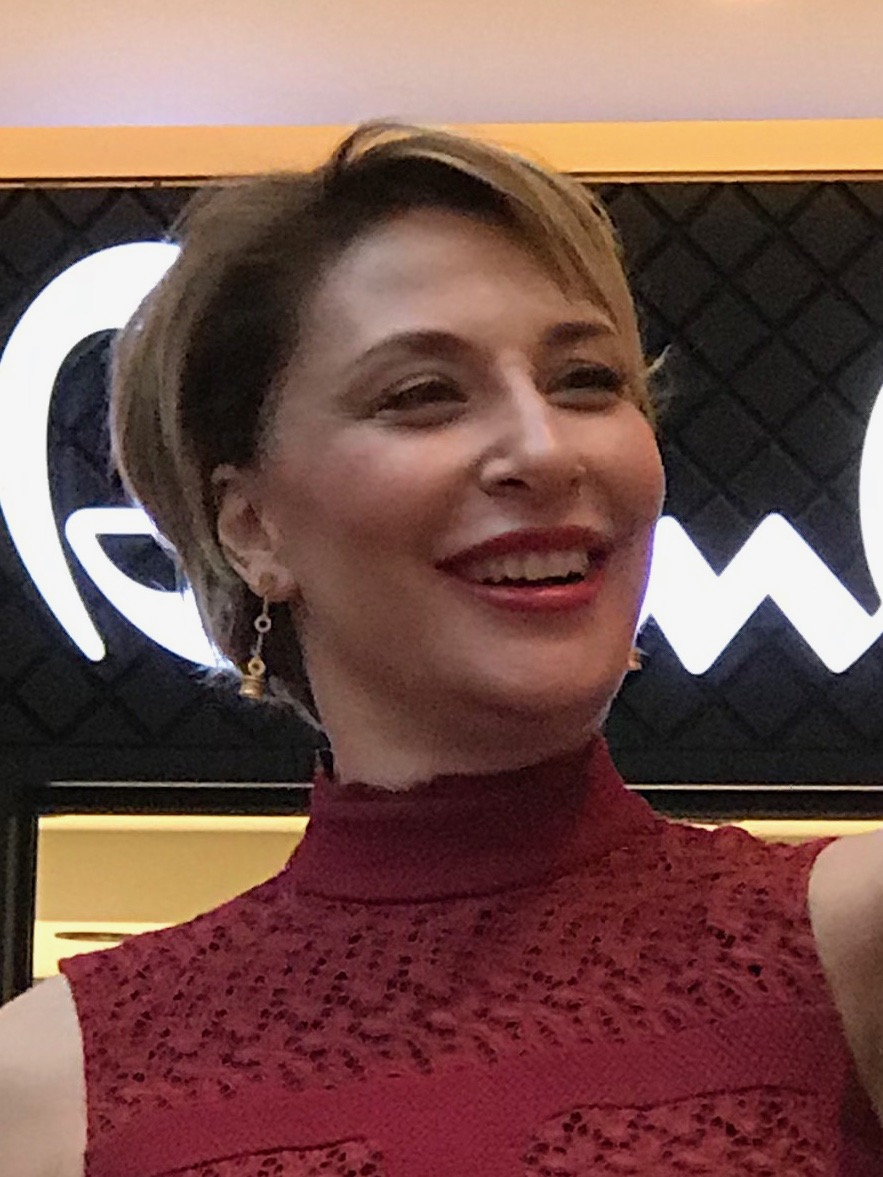
- Birsel at the premiere of Aile Arasında, 2017
- Born: Gülse Şener; 11 March 1971 (age 55); Istanbul, Turkey
- Education: Boğaziçi University; Columbia University
- Occupations: Actor; scenarist; columnist; writer; TV presenter
- Years active: 1992–present
- Spouse: Murat Birsel (m. 1999)

Gülse Birsel (née Şener; born 11 March 1971) is a Turkish actress, screenwriter and columnist. She is known for the sitcom series, Avrupa Yakası, Yalan Dünya and the film 7 Kocalı Hürmüz.

== Early life ==
Gülse Birsel was born on 11 March 1971 in Istanbul as the third child of Gültekin and Semiha Şener. Her great-grandmother is of Circassian descent from Varto. Her father was a lawyer, while her mother was a housewife. Her name was chosen from the first syllables of the names of her mother and father. Her elder brother Bozkurt is fifteen years her senior, while her elder sister Dilek is thirteen years older than her. Her older brother is an ophthalmologist and a former national volleyball player. She finished her secondary education at Beyoğlu Anatolian High School. She was thinking of acting as a profession until the end of high school. However, with the wish of her family, she first studied at Boğaziçi University, Department of Economics. Between 1994 and 1996, she completed her MFA at Columbia University.

== Career ==
During her second year attending university, Gülse Birsel started working for Aktüel magazine. Upon her return to Turkey in 1996, she started working at ATV, writing the foreign news bulletins for three months. A year later she was appointed editor-in-chief of Esquire Turkey magazine. From December 1997 to 2003, she was editor-in-chief of Harper's Bazaar Turkey. She worked as a columnist in Sabah newspaper from 2002 to 2012. During this period, she also worked as general coordinator in FHM, Gezi, Harper's Bazaar and House Beautiful. On March 6, 2002, she made her television debut on ATV's g.a.g.. In March 2003, she published the scenario for g.a.g. together with the articles she had previously written in a book titled Gayet Ciddiyim. Until February 11, 2004, she served as the presenter and writer of g.a.g..

In March 2003, together with Levent Özdilek, she played in a leading role in ATV's series Eyvah! Eski Kocam, but the show was canceled after the second episode. In February 2004, she started working as both an actress and scenarist for ATV's series Avrupa Yakası. She shared the leading role with Gazanfer Özcan, Hümeyra and Ata Demirer. In May 2004, her second book Hâlâ Ciddiyim was published. She made her cinematic debut in 2005, with the movie Hırsız Var!. Her third book, Yolculuk Nereye Hemşerim?, was released in August 2005. In April 2008, she carried the 2008 Summer Olympics torch in Istanbul. In 2009, she appeared in her first cinematic role in the movie 7 Kocalı Hürmüz.

Avrupa Yakası ended in June 2009. Birsel's fourth book Velev ki Ciddiyim! was released in December 2009, followed by her fifth book Yazlık in June 2011. In January 2012, she began working as an actress and scenarist on Kanal D's series Yalan Dünya, which lasted for four seasons. She shared the leading role with Altan Erkekli, Füsun Demirel and Olgun Şimşek. In Mart 2013, she started working as a columnist for Hürriyet. In 2015, she became one of the judges on TV8's contest Komedi Türkiye. Her sixth book, Memleketi Ben Kurtaracağım! was released in November 2015.

Her first feature film, Aile Arasında, in which she served as both scenarist and actress was released in December 2017. In February 2018, she started working as a scenarist and lead actress on Star TV's comedy series Jet Sosyete. In October 2019, Birsel announced her resignation from her post as a columnist for Hürriyet newspaper.

Birsel wrote and starred in Yılbaşı, which released on Disney+ in December 2022.

== Personal life ==
In August 1999, Gülse Birsel married columnist and TV programmer Murat Birsel in Cannes, France. The two met through Ayşe Arman. Birsel, who has said that she is not suitable for motherhood, has no children. Birsel and her husband live in Nişantaşı. In August 2014, her mother Semiha Şener died.

== Publication ==
- Gayet Ciddiyim (March 2003)
- Hâlâ Ciddiyim (May 2004)
- Yolculuk Nereye Hemşerim? (August 2005)
- Velev ki Ciddiyim! (December 2009)
- Yazlık (June 2011)
- Memleketi Ben Kurtaracağım! (November 2015)

== Filmography ==
Cinema
Year	Title	Role	Notes
2004	Hırsız Var!	Binnur Ersöz	
2009	7 Kocalı Hürmüz	Safinaz	
2017	Aile Arasında	Mihriban	

İnternet
Year	Title	Role	Platform
2022	Yılbaşı Gecesi	Seçilay	Disney+

Television
Year	Title	Role	Notes
2002–04	g.a.g.	Herself	Presenter
2003	Eyvah! Eski Kocam	Nilüfer	Leading
2004–09	Avrupa Yakası	Aslı Sütçüoğlu	Leading role
2009	Ah Kalbim		Supporting role
2012–14	Yalan Dünya	Deniz Alsancak	Leading role
2015	Komedi Türkiye	Herself	Judge
2018–20	Jet Sosyete	Gizem Özpamuk	Leading role
