= Rutkay Aziz =

Turkish actor (born 1947)

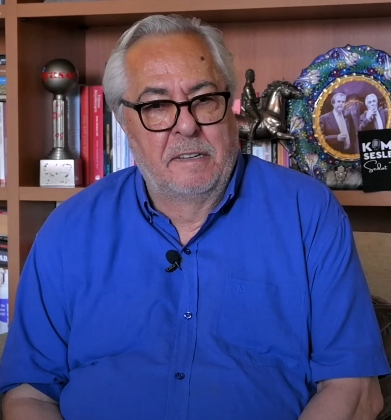
- Born: Ünal Aziz Rutkay; 16 May 1947 (age 79); Istanbul, Turkey
- Occupation: Actor
- Years active: 1970–present
- Children: Doğa Rutkay

Rutkay Aziz (born 16 May 1947) is a Turkish actor. He has appeared in more than twenty films since 1987.

== Selected filmography ==
Year	Title	Role	Notes
1987	Iron Earth, Copper Sky		
1988	Mist		
1991	Piano Piano Kid		
1998	The Republic		
