= Belgin =

- Gender: Female
- Language: Turkish

Origin
- Language: Turkic

Belgin is a common feminine Turkish given name. The name is often associated with meanings such as "clear" or "distinct".

== People ==
=== Given name ===
- Belgin Doruk (1936–1995), Turkish actress
- Belgin Sarılmışer (1958–1989), Turkish singer, known as Bergen
