= Murder of Özgecan Aslan =

2015 killing of a Turkish university student who resisted attempted rape

Özgecan Aslan
- Born: 22 October 1995; Mersin, Turkey
- Died: 11 February 2015 (aged 19); Near Tarsus, Turkey
- Cause of death: Homicide by stabbing and beating
- Body discovered: 13 February 2015; Near Çamalan, Tarsus
- Resting place: Mersin Interfaith Cemetery
- Occupation: Student
- Known for: Victim of murder and attempted rape

Özgecan Aslan (22 October 1995 – 11 February 2015) was a Turkish university student who was murdered while resisting attempted rape on 11 February 2015 on a minibus in Mersin, Turkey. Her burnt body was discovered on 13 February. The murder was committed by minibus driver Ahmet Suphi Altındöken, and his father Necmettin Altındöken and friend Fatih Gökçe were accomplices in covering up the murder. All perpetrators were handed aggravated life sentences without the possibility of parole.

The murder sparked nationwide outrage and protests across the country in the following days. Thousands of protesters took to the streets in several provinces, with some criticizing the government for its "insufficient response" and alleged normalisation of the rape of non-conservative women. The protests were described as the first mass movement for Turkish women. Her killing also provoked calls for reforms to combat violence against women more effectively. The case received great attention on social media and prompted women to share their experiences of harassment, with 16 February being dubbed as "Black Monday" due to protests. The murder was described as a catalyst for women to speak out about their long-withheld suffering, but The Guardian expected also a rift between women who defend silence and the patriarchal status quo and those refusing to keep quiet.

== Background ==
Özgecan was born into a poor Alevi Turkish family, who traced their origins to Tunceli. She was born and raised in Mersin. She was a first-year psychology student in the Çağ University in Tarsus, a major she had developed a strong passion for while studying at the tourism high school. Her parents were supportive of her, with her mother returning to the workforce in order to fund her education, to augment the 50% scholarship she had earned. Her father was a graphic designer, but he lacked a permanent job at the time of the murder, while her mother had previously retired from a cargo company. She was also planning to work at a hotel in Northern Cyprus during the summer to help with her fees. She had an elder sister who was studying opera and singing in Adana; Özgecan was also described as an avid opera listener and reader.

The perpetrator's father, who assisted him, hailed from a wealthy family in Tarsus and was at one time a jeweller. However, he had since gone bankrupt and started to work with his son as a minibus driver. He had previous records of smuggling. The perpetrator's wife (married to him five years prior to the murder) claimed that he had continuously inflicted violence on her, and that he had forced her to withdraw her suit for divorce a few months before the incident as he allegedly had threatened to kill her and their son.

A friend of Özgecan claimed that they had been afraid to use the minibuses in the area, and that the drivers and some passengers had stared at them through mirrors and windows whenever they left the bus several times before the incident.

== Murder and search ==
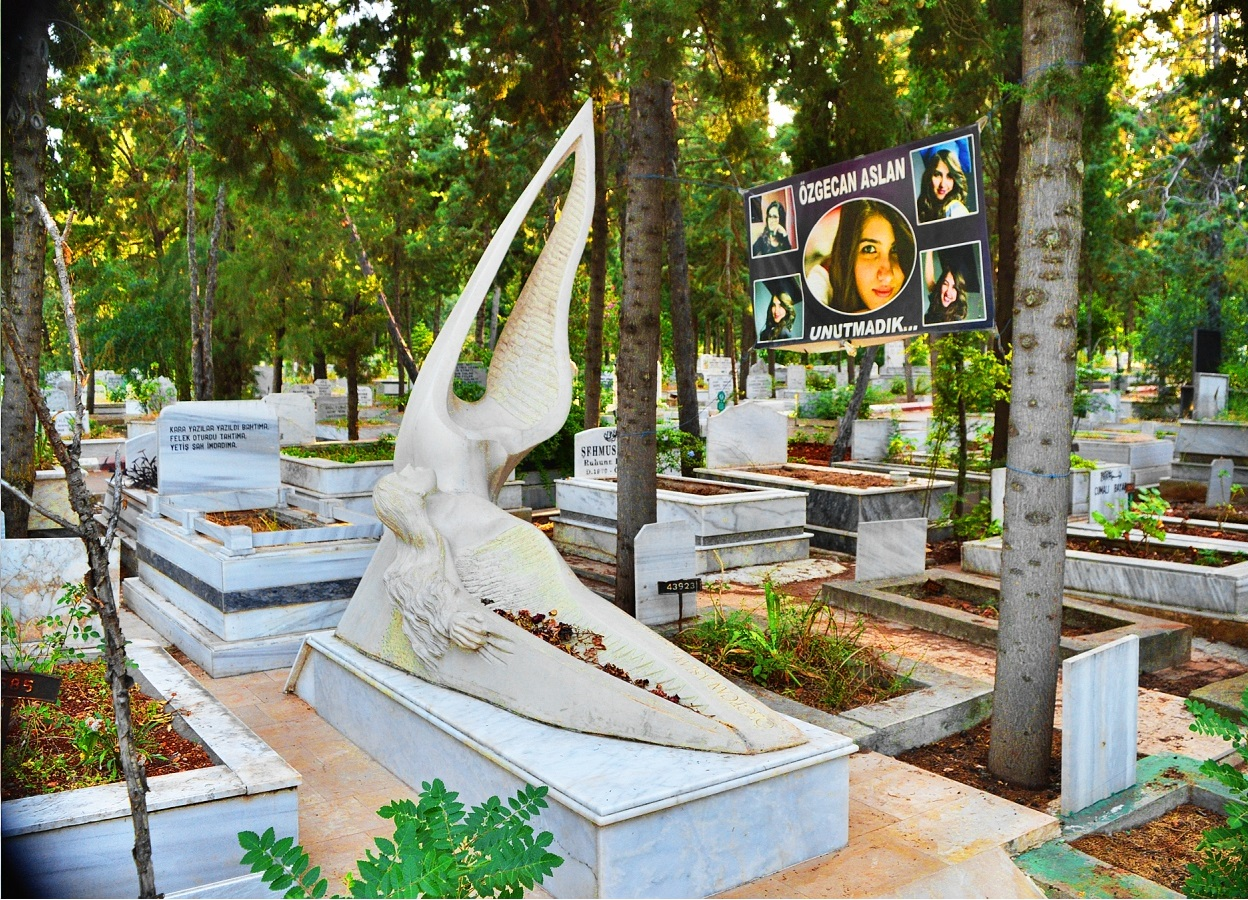
The grave of Özgecan Aslan, Mersin Interfaith Cemetery.

On the day of the murder, Özgecan went to a shopping center with her friend. After eating, the women took the minibus to return home. Özgecan was last seen by her friend when she alighted at her stop, leaving Özgecan alone in the minibus. As Özgecan did not return home after nightfall, she was reported missing. Meanwhile, the minibus driver stopped at a Gendarmerie checkpoint to ask for directions, but instead of following the directions, diverted into a forest. The gendarme became suspicious and stopped the vehicle to find smears of blood, which the driver claimed had been caused by a fight between passengers. After a brief investigation, the suspects were released. After Özgecan was reported missing, the gendarme looked for the minibus again. It was captured with two of the suspects; Özgecan's hat (confirmed as hers by her father) was found inside. The two suspects subsequently admitted the murder, and the search for the third suspect began.

According to news reports, the driver of the minibus attempted to rape Özgecan, but she resisted by using pepper spray. Following this, he stabbed her multiple times, and beat her to death with an iron rod. He returned to Tarsus following the murder and asked for help from his father and a friend. The three men burnt Özgecan's body together in a forest and cut off her hands, as Özgecan had scratched the perpetrator's face during the struggle, and they feared that his DNA would be identified on the fingernails. Later, the post-mortem examination revealed that she had not been raped and DNA of the prime suspect was indeed found on her fingernails.

The trio is then alleged to have disposed of the burnt body into a creek near the village of Çamalan. The body was discovered by the police on 13 February and was transported to the Tarsus State Hospital. Özgecan's body and face were burnt to the point that it rendered identification impossible; clothes found with her body were used in identification.

== Investigation and trial ==
=== Investigation ===
During the initial investigation, Ahmet Suphi Altındöken, the minibus driver confessed that he committed the murder and that his father, Necmettin Altındöken, and friend, Fatih Gökçe, helped him. According to the newspaper Hürriyet, he displayed a notably calm demeanor while he was questioned and answered questions in a cold-blooded manner.

According to Turkish law, the defendant in such cases must have a lawyer for the criminal prosecution to begin. However, the 1,600 lawyers of the bar association of Mersin made a joint statement that none of them wanted to support such "brutal savages" in the court and refused to assign a lawyer. Two lawyers were present at the moment of questioning, but one of them was a relative of the suspects and the other was previously uninformed of the incident, and they both declined support later. This stalled the transfer of the suspects to the criminal prosecution.

On 16 February, the minibus driver reportedly changed his testimony, saying that, while he did commit the murder, he was under the influence of alcohol when he did so and did not intend to assault Özgecan sexually or kill her. He also claimed that it was Özgecan who started the fight by attacking him while he tried to take her to the destination through a shorter way, and that he had gone to the back of the minibus in order to have a talk with her. He reportedly claimed (with the hopes of getting a reduced sentence) that Özgecan had given him 100 Turkish liras to make him take a shortcut. But this claim was denied by her parents, who stated that they had only given 20 Turkish Liras to their daughter.

The perpetrator's father reportedly stated that he was unaware of the murder when his son came, said that he had been involved in a fight and wanted a bag, claiming that he was going to bring a chicken. He then reportedly said that his son and his son's friend had slit the throat of Özgecan, before severing her hands. He claimed that his son wanted to keep her body at his father's house, but as he refused, they burned the body at a remote area, after which he also burned Özgecan's blouse, scarf, books and the strap of her bag.

On 20 February, it was reported that the district attorney had finished collecting evidence and was awaiting the post-mortem examination report from the Institute of Forensic Science in Ankara to take action. He would allegedly demand the harshest possible sentence available, under clause 3 of the Turkish Penal Code, claiming that the murder was a case of "monstrous and torturous homicide", which would disqualify him from seeking a parole.

The post-mortem examination report was released on 23 February. The report stated that the body had been mostly burned, but that a number of wounds from stabbing and fatal cuts, especially at her neck, signs of trauma resulting from impact with blunt objects at her head and edema and bruises at various places of her body had been found. Her severed hands, which were found later, were also examined and traces of Suphi Altındöken's DNA were found in the nails. However, no signs of rape were detected.

=== Trial ===
The first hearing of the trial for her murder took place on 12 June. The attorney demanded aggravated life imprisonment for the suspects. The minibus driver made statements that conflicted with his prior testimony, saying that his father had learned about the murder "at the last minute" and that his friend had tried to rape Özgecan. The trial was postponed to 9 September. Meanwhile, the Bar of Mersin brought the cases of seven people suspected of being involved in the murder of being accomplices, including the aunt of Altındöken, to the Supreme Court, demanding the trial of these suspects who were previously dismissed of charges.

On 9 September, the attorney specifically called for the court to refrain from reducing the sentence of the defendants due to the "outrage the case [had] caused in the society". The defendants were not brought to the court for the hearing, but joined through a voice and video communication system. The minibus driver claimed that he had seen his friend, Gökçe, "tightening his belt and pulling up the zip of his pants" after descending from the vehicle and that he knew that his friend attempted sexual assault, though he did not know whether he succeeded. Gökçe denied the accusation. During the same hearing, a lawyer for Özgecan's family said that they did not agree with the attorney's conclusion that no rape took place, as Suphi Altındöken had traces of nail scratching on him and claimed that Özgecan's genital area was burned intentionally to prevent the detection of rape. All three defendants denied raping or being involved in the rape of Özgecan.

The trial concluded on 3 December as the three defendants were given aggravated life sentences without possibility of parole. The rationale for the minibus driver, Ahmet Suphi Altındöken, was "murder with monstrous instinct and torture, murder with the motive of hiding a crime or evading capture, murder due to the frustration caused by the inability to commit another crime, attempt at sexual assault and deprivation of personal liberty with sexual motives". He was given a prison sentence of an additional 27 years due to other charges. His friend, Fatih Gökçe, was sentenced to an additional 24 years due to various other charges.

The perpetrator is believed to be an ultra-nationalist Turk, and had previously published a lot of pictures where he makes the Grey Wolves salutation.

== Response ==
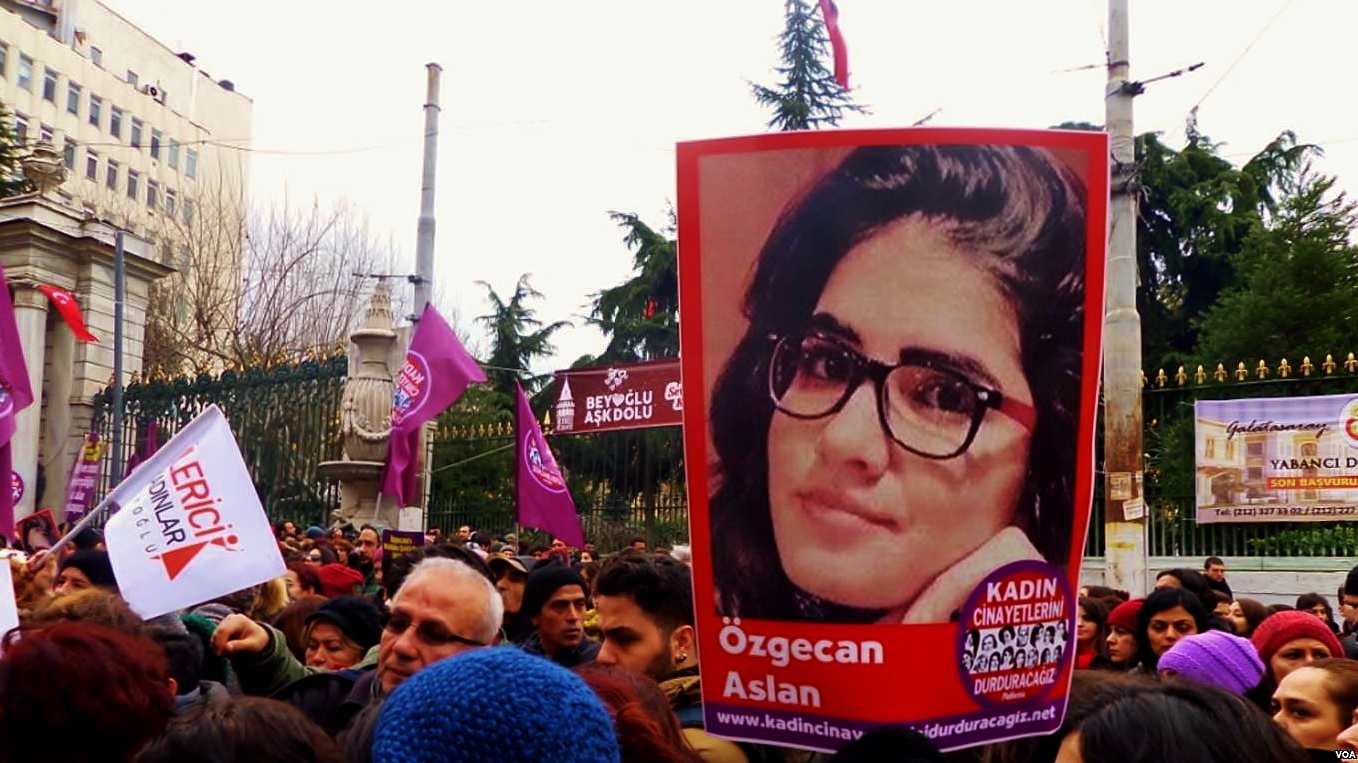
Protests held after the murder of Özgecan Aslan in İstiklal Avenue, Istanbul

The case became a cause célèbre in Turkey as a marker of the violence against women and was compared to the 2012 Delhi gang rape and murder case. The brutality of the murder especially caused a public outcry, with thousands of protesters taking to the streets across Turkey.

In Tarsus, a mob tried to lynch the suspects as they were arrested by the police. The funeral of Özgecan was attended by around 5000 people. Women defied the imam in the funeral by attending the prayer together with the men and carrying the coffin of Özgecan, against the religious tradition.

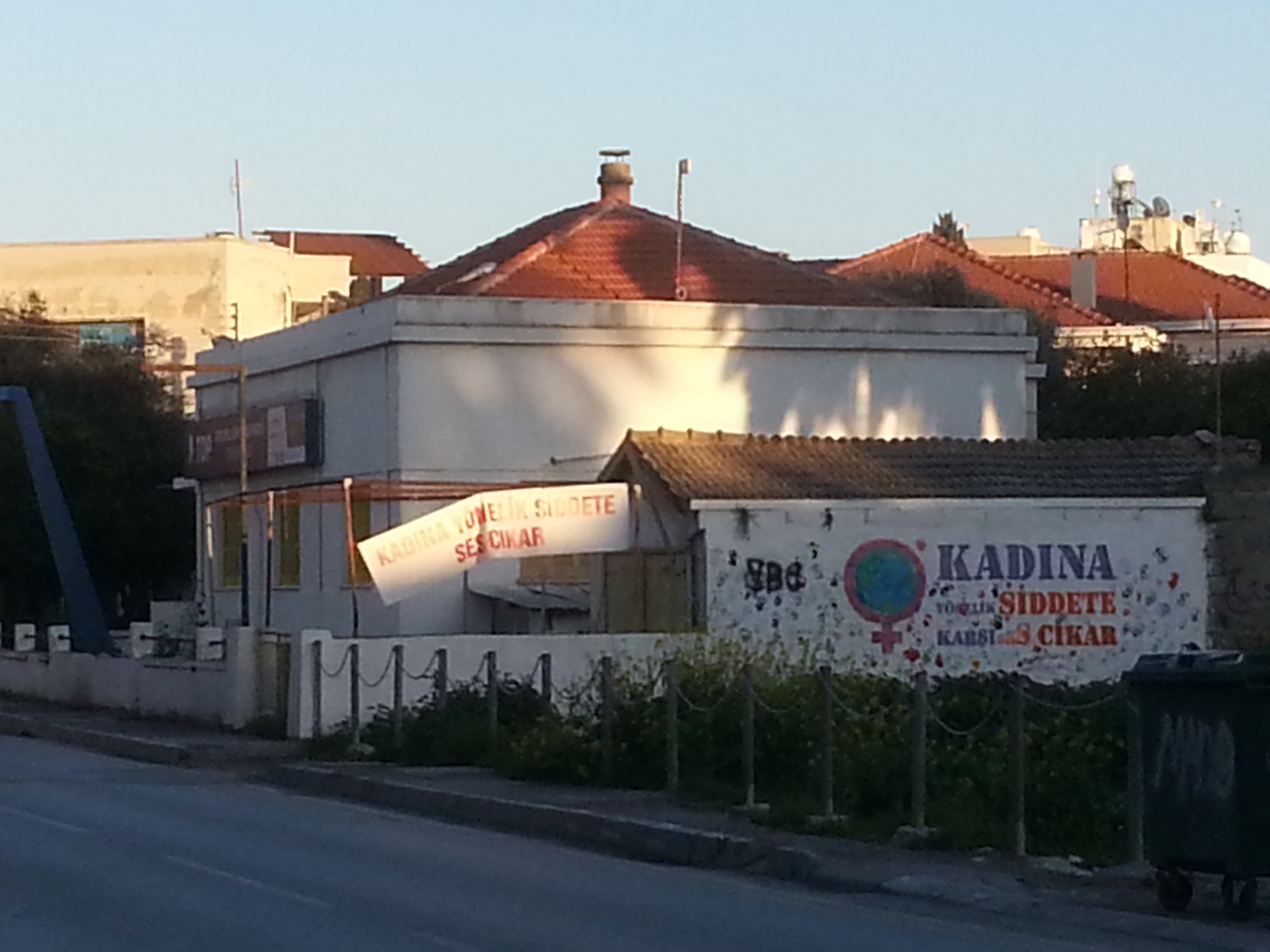
Graffiti and a poster in North Nicosia at the headquarters of a political party, reading "speak out against violence against women", following the murder

=== Protests ===
In Istanbul, protesters, most of whom were women, gathered in the İstiklal Avenue and marched to the Taksim Square on 14 February, also condemning the alleged inaction of the government and lack of official condemnation, with thousands further protesting in the Kadıköy district. In Ankara, protests took place despite police intervention, as demonstrators occupied a central park. Around a thousand protesters marched in İzmir, where almost all of them were women, who refused to let men join the protest. Protests also took place in Tarsus, Mersin, Adana, Bodrum, Eskişehir, Balıkesir, Batman, Samsun, Antalya and Tunceli, among other cities. Further protests took place in Istanbul on 15 February. 1,500 students marched in Gaziantep. The number of protesters in Mersin were reported to be around 3000; a man reportedly harassed and attacked the women in the protests, causing a fight. In Trabzon, while a group of 700 women were protesting the murder, a drunk man shouted that "the murder [was] well-deserved for Özgecan", causing a commotion. Members of a group of 50 women who hung banners in the Taksim Square, Istanbul, were arrested by the police. Claims of the courts having sympathies for perpetrators of violence against women and thus issuing reduced sentences were highlighted during the protests. The current conservative government has also been accused of creating an "Islamic atmosphere", in which non-conservative women are seen as deserving violence. According to CBC News, the motivation of the protesters is to show that "female lives are not disposable in Turkey". Hürriyet reported that the protests had simultaneously united and divided Turkey.

On 15 February, around 500 people marched in Sivas and a group of Turkish people protested in Trafalgar Square in London. Further protests took place on 16 February in Kastamonu, Karabük, Kuşadası, Salihli, Burdur, Kırşehir, Bilecik, Denizli, Merzifon, Bitlis, Sivas, the Istanbul University and the Giresun University, where the university administration organised the protest, and the protesters held banners saying "we are all Özgecan". In Mersin, a crowd gathered again for protests, and the police supported the demonstrators by distributing Aslan's pictures and chanting using megaphones.

On 17 February, protests continued both in Turkey and abroad. Northern Cyprus saw protests as around 100 protesters, among whom were members of the parliament, held a symbolic funeral prayer and marched through the streets of the capital, North Nicosia with a coffin. Protests also took place in Kyrenia. In Germany, around 200 people demonstrated on the Hauptwache square in Frankfurt, with further protests taking place in Berlin, Hamburg, Hannover and Duisburg. In Turkey, workers demonstrated in İzmir policewomen in Iğdır, graduates and students of religious schools in Erzurum. Around 1000 people marched in Diyarbakır, with more protests taking place in Muş, Varto, Hakkari, Şanlıurfa and universities in Istanbul, Ankara, İzmir, Edirne, Çanakkale, Zonguldak, Adana, Antalya, Eskişehir, Muğla and Mersin.

On 18 February, major protests took place in Tarsus. 15,000 people marched in the Çağ University and blocked a major highway. The protesters almost all wore black, with some wearing clothes soaked in makeshift blood. In Ankara, demonstrations took place in front of the Turkish parliament, where members of a major labor union gathered, and in the Middle East Technical University, where the demonstrators held banners saying "it is not in the disposition of women to die, but it is to overthrow the AKP". It was claimed that a group of protesters in Torbalı was taken to the regional headquarters of the ruling party and questioned about their motives, leaders and whether they wanted to initiate a resurgence of the Gezi Park protests.

Protests continued on 19 February across Turkey despite severe weather conditions, as hundreds marched in cities including Bartın, Çanakkale, Kütahya and Niğde. A mall in Antalya projected the picture of Özgecan over an area of 6500 square meters using LED lights. Her family announced their decision to channel the donations that were given to them to a fund promoting educational centers against violence against women and children.

On 21 February, large protests took place in Istanbul. A march was organised by the municipality of Beşiktaş in central Istanbul. The march was described as "huge" by the press and attended by national celebrities such as Feridun Düzağaç; protesters held banners saying "take your hands off my body" and "I was born free and will live as free". On the same day, a group of women and men in skirts marched in the İstiklal Avenue in Taksim. Thousands also marched in the Kadıköy district of Istanbul, as well as in İzmir and Ankara. A protest in Akçakoca caused a discussion about the death sentence. The Buca district of İzmir, Samsun and Kırıkkale saw protests, among other cities. A group also protested in the Union Square in New York City.

=== Political response ===
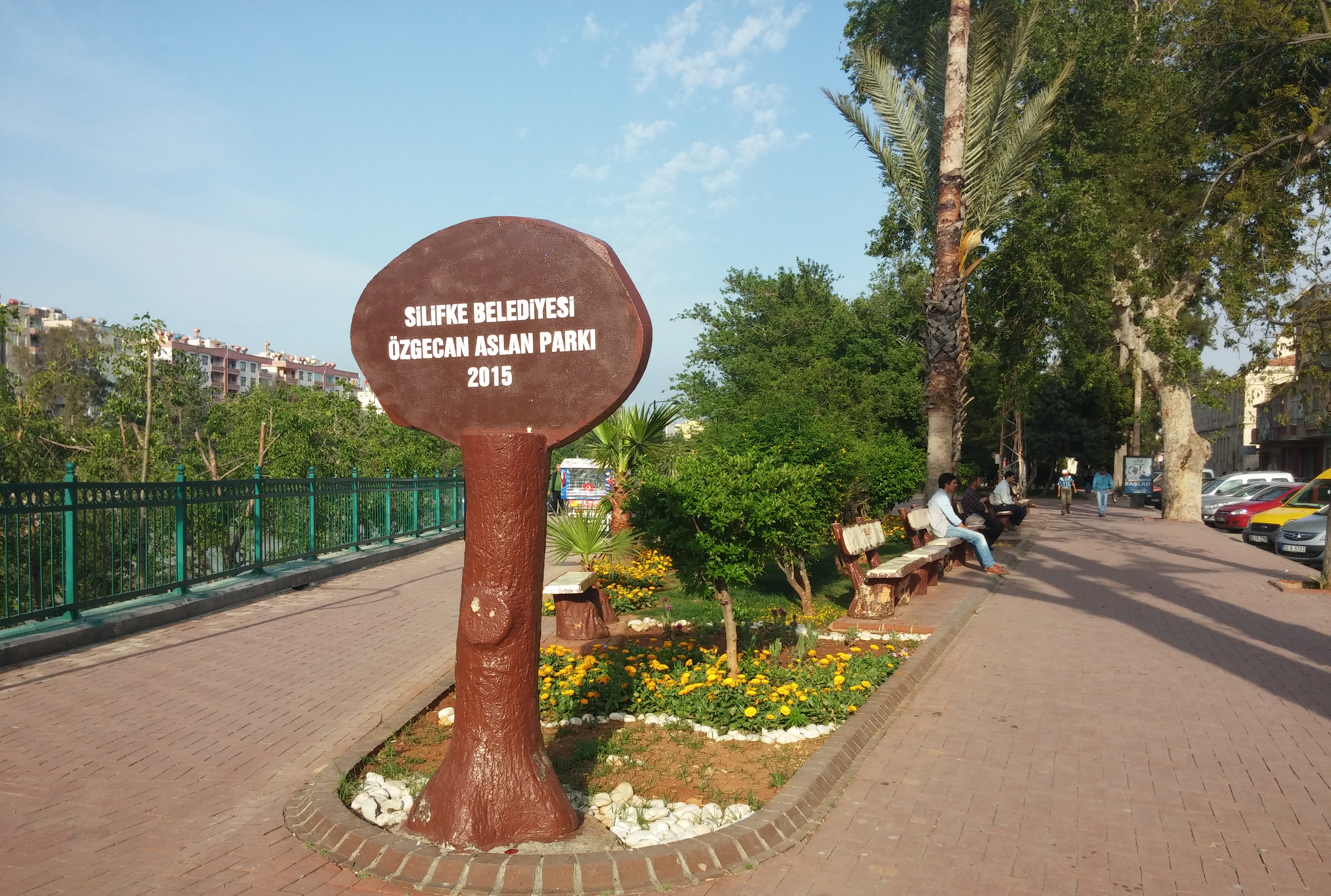
The Göksu Park in Silifke was renamed as the "Özgecan Aslan Park"

The government response was criticized by many Turks as "too little, too late". Prime Minister Ahmet Davutoğlu condemned the attack and announced that this would prompt a widespread campaign against violence against women. He also announced that a youth center in Antalya would be named after Özgecan. Özgecan's university also decided to name a newly built psychology lab after her. The Turkish Council of Ministers discussed the murder of Özgecan, but declined to condone a possible reintroduction of the death penalty for such offenses, as it had been proposed by some. President Recep Tayyip Erdoğan also offered his condolences to the family of Özgecan. He later criticized the protesters, claiming that some of them had danced during the protests, committing a cultural offense due to their non-conformity to religious norms. On 17 February, he further criticized the women's rights movement in Turkey, saying that they had criticized him when he said that "women are entrusted to men by God", a supposition that was proved by the incident. Women's rights activists linked previous comments made by Erdoğan and his fellow party members, such as "you cannot make men and women equal" by Erdoğan and "women should not laugh out loud in public" by Bülent Arınç to an alleged attempt to solidify gender roles and suppress women's rights.

Ayşenur İslam, the Minister of Family and Social Affairs, who visited Özgecan's family, met with protests during a press statement. Members of the parliament from the Republican People's Party, the main opposition in Turkey, left the parliament when she was delivering a speech about the murder. Emine Erdoğan, the first lady of Turkey, said that the fate of Özgecan "never got out of their minds" and that "women were schools for their children". Sare Davutoğlu, the wife of the prime minister, visited Özgecan's family.

The leaders of the opposition parties in the Turkish parliament sent tweets condemning the murder. Kemal Kılıçdaroğlu, leader of the Republican People's Party (CHP), tweeted "harassment, rape and violence are not in the disposition of women". Devlet Bahçeli appealed to Erdoğan, writing "the one in the palace said that the politicians are responsible for the murders in their country; now is the time for those that are responsible and guilty to rise". Selahattin Demirtaş, co-leader of the Peoples' Democratic Party, said, "if this is their perception of masculinity, we will destroy this perception and send it to the cesspool of history". A senior official at the CHP accused the mentality of the AKP of causing the murder and cursed the previous misogynistic statements by AKP officials or allegedly pro-AKP people, such as "it is indelicate for pregnant women to walk around in public". The CHP and the HDP organised protests against the murder.

Derviş Eroğlu, the president of Northern Cyprus, called Özgecan's family to send his condolences. The American Embassy in Ankara posted a tweet condemning the murder.

=== Social media ===
The murder sparked widespread outrage on social media, with the hashtag "#sendeanlat" ("you must also tell") becoming the most popular in the country, encouraging women to tell their own stories of harassment and everyday fears in Turkey. The campaign was also supported by popular figures in the country, including the actress Beren Saat, who wrote a lengthy account of her experiences of harassment. It became the third most popular topic globally on Twitter, gathering more than 440,000 tweets in two days. Women shared stories of having to carry pepper spray and pocket knives for short everyday walks, wearing fake wedding rings and getting off buses early to avoid being the last passenger. There were also stories of girls started being harassed at the age of five and schoolgirls having to endure daily harassment on buses, especially when wearing skirts.

16 February was dubbed as "Black Monday" in Turkey, with many citizens, including celebrities, wearing black to raise awareness about violence against women, in accordance with the popular hashtag "#Özgecaniçinsiyahgiy" ("wear black for Özgecan"). The campaign was widely popular as thousands marched in black in major cities and high schools across the country complied with it. An online petition demanding more responsible decisions from institutions in cases like Özgecan's gathered more than 600,000 signatures in two days. The murder caused widespread fear among women in Tarsus, some of whom stated that they would never use the minibus again and opt for trains as much as possible instead.

A campaign was started in Azerbaijan, where men posted photos of themselves wearing mini skirts in protest, with the hashtag #ozgecanicinminietekgiy ("wear a mini skirt for Özgecan"). The campaign soon spread to Turkey and globally, with support from the actress Emma Watson.

The responses to the murder by numerous individuals and institutions, such as singer Nihat Doğan and the newspaper Yeni Akit were met with widespread condemnation outrage after being perceived to have defended rape on the grounds that mini-skirts provoked it. In a tweet deleted shortly after by Doğan, he claimed that the secular system has "corrupted" individuals and that women should not call out if they were being abused by such individuals and wearing a mini-skirt at the same time. The tweet resulted in him being withdrawn from the cast of the TV show Survivor, his manager cutting all business ties and his suspension from the Galatasaray sports club. Doğan eventually made a live apology on Beyaz TV. A group of lawyers filed a criminal complaint against Doğan in İzmir. The Conservative newspaper Yeni Akit blamed the murder on a "western lifestyle" and referred to the comments of pro-women's rights journalists such as Uğur Dündar as the main cause. Numerous tweets that appeared to condone the murder on religious grounds, including on the fact that Özgecan was of Alevi origin, also drew criticism.

=== Commemoration ===
On 19 March 2016, a sculpture in the shape of a phoenix was erected in memory of Özgecan.

=== "Özgecan Law" ===
Following the murder, a petition was started to prevent reduction of sentences being given to perpetrators of violence and murder against women. The petition garnered more than 700,000 signatures within 48 hours and went on to become the most popular petition in Turkish history with more than 1,125,000 signatures. Before the Turkish general election of June 2015, the Peoples' Democratic Party (HDP) and the Republican Turkish Party (CHP) promised to pass the "Özgecan Law" after the election, with the HDP co-leader Figen Yüksekdağ signing the petition herself. After the election, Gülay Yedekci, a member of the parliament from the CHP, put forward the proposal for the law on 6 July. The proposal would remove the provision for the reduction of sentences for the perpetrators of violence and murder against women upon the grounds of "good behavior" and "unjust provocation" from Article 102 of the Turkish Penal Code. The proposal would also increase the penalty for child marriage and remove the provisions about the "consent" of the child. Such proposals had already been put forward in the parliament for three years, but, according to CHP MP Aylin Nazlıaka, were passed over whilst laws that "appeared to increase the freedom of women, but actually condemning them more and more to their houses" were approved. The proposed changes were postponed again as an early general election was scheduled for 1 November. The postponement of the "Özgecan Law" prompted further protests, which were supported by MPs from the CHP.

On 18 November, Aylin Nazlıaka put forward the proposed changes again. The proposed law, however, was criticized by a group of lawyers advocating women's rights from Antalya, who claimed that the heavier sentences would increase the brutality of future violence as perpetrators would want to destroy any evidence, and that the problem lay with the sexist upbringing of children. Upon the conviction of the perpetrators on 3 December, Özgecan's mother called for the "Özgecan Law" to be passed as soon as possible.

== Prison attack on the murder convicts ==
While serving life sentence at a high-security prison in Adana, Özgecan Aslan's killer Ahmet Suphi Altındöken and his father were gunned down by an inmate in their own cell on 11 April 2016. Severely wounded, they were rushed to hospital. Ahmet Suphi Altındöken died; his father survived the attack. Gültekin Alan, a 46-year-old inmate serving a 50-year sentence, was found guilty, and sentenced to an aggravated life imprisonment and 29 years in July 2017. He was transferred to the high-security prison in Diyarbakır.

No cemetery in Tarsus or Adana accepted to host Ahmet Suphi Altındöken's funeral. After five days of deadlock, the corpse, disguised as a woman's, was taken out of the hospital morgue at night in an undercover operation. He was interred at an undisclosed burial site.

== See also ==
- 2012 Delhi gang rape and murder
- Crime in Turkey
- List of solved missing person cases (post-2000)
- Pippa Bacca
- Women in Turkey
- Murder of Ibrahim Oktugan
