= Farah Zeynep Abdullah =

Turkish actress (born 1989)

- Born: 17 August 1989 (age 37); Beşiktaş, Istanbul, Turkey
- Education: University of Kent
- Occupations: Actress; singer
- Years active: 2010–present
- Website: fzaofficial.com

Farah Zeynep Abdullah (born 17 August 1989) is a Turkish actress and singer. She garnered critical acclaim and nationwide recognition for her movies and television series. She is the recipient of two Siyad awards, the most prestigious film awards in Turkey.

== Early life ==
Farah Zeynep Abdullah was born on 17 August 1989, in Beşiktaş, Istanbul. Abdullah has two brothers. Her secondary education was spent at the Lycée Français Saint-Michel in Istanbul until her family moved to London due to her father's job. She completed her degree in French and Drama and Media Studies from the University of Kent in 2013.

== Career ==
=== TV series ===
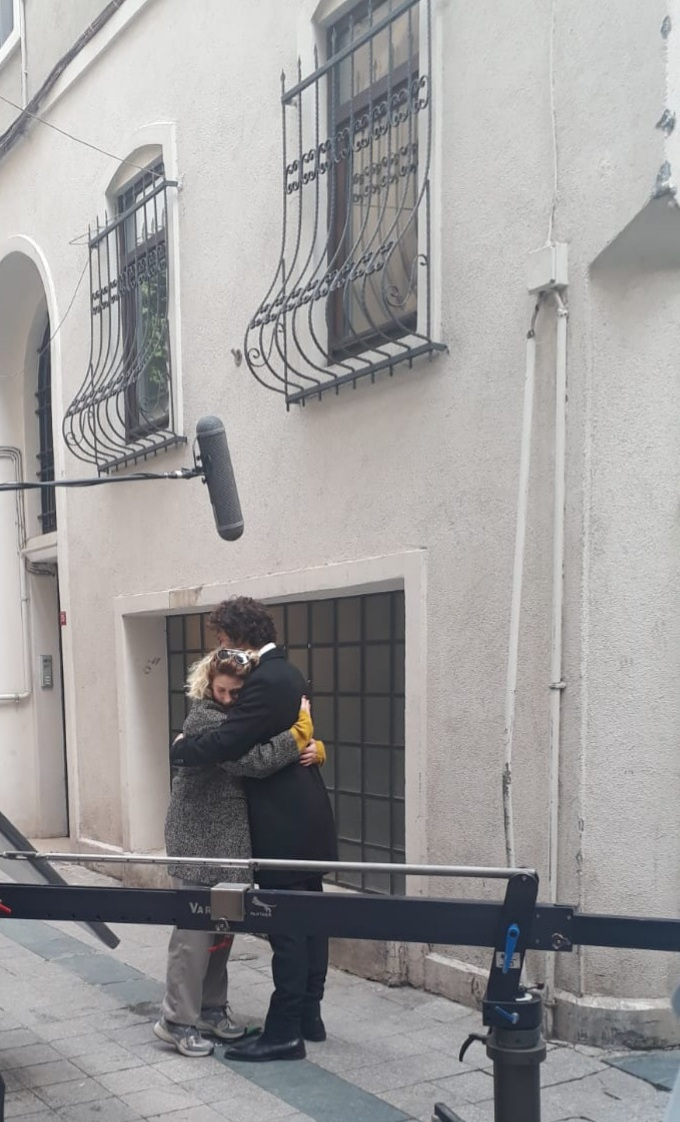
Abdullah and Birkan Sokullu on the set of Masumlar Apartmanı

In 2010, during her studies at the University of Kent, Abdullah was offered a role in the melodrama Öyle Bir Geçer Zaman ki, for which she completed 2 seasons and 79 episodes. The series also won her a Best Supporting Actress award at the Antalya Television Awards in 2011.

She then worked for the second time alongside Kıvanç Tatlıtuğ in the period drama Kurt Seyit ve Şura.

In late July 2016, rumours of Abdullah joining the hit series Muhteşem Yüzyıl: Kösem ("Magnificent Century: Kösem") surfaced on social media. A few days later, it was confirmed that she had joined the series in the role of Hungarian princess Farya Bethlen.

Abdullah then starred as a singer in the series Gülizar. She shared the lead role with Berk Cankat, who previously acted in Muhteşem Yüzyıl: Kösem but never met as they portrayed their characters in two completely different seasons.

Between 2020 and 2021, she worked alongside Birkan Sokullu in Masumlar Apartmanı ("Apartment of the Innocents"), which is adapted from a novel by Gülseren Budayıcıoğlu.

=== Films ===
In 2013, she appeared in Yılmaz Erdoğan's film Kelebeğin Rüyası ("The Butterfly's Dream"). It was selected by the Minister of Culture and Tourism as Turkey's candidate for the 2014's Academy Awards. For the role, Abdullah won the trophy for Best Supporting Actress at the 18th Sadri Alışık Cinema and Theatre Awards and Cinema Writers Association Awards.

In 2014, she appeared in the film Bi Küçük Eylül Meselesi ("A Small September Affair"). Abdullah later starred in director Çağan Irmak's musical romance film Unutursam Fisilda ("Whisper If I Forget"). The role brought her multiple awards as she stunned audiences with her acting and singing skills. It became the 5th most watched film in Turkey in 2014. The song 'Gel ya da git' performed by Farah for the soundtrack of the film 'Whisper If I Forget' topped the national charts for numeral consecutive weeks.

In 2015, she voiced Princess Courtney in the Turkish version of Barbie in Rock 'N Royals. Later that year Abdullah completed Ekşi Elmalar ("Sour Apples"), her second project with director Yılmaz Erdoğan. The film was released on 28 October 2016 in Turkey and in early November in Europe. Her acting was very well received and praised by critics and viewers alike.

In 2018, she played famous singer Ajda Pekkan in the fantasy comedy film Arif V 216, where she sang Pekkan's songs "Milyonzade" and "Boşvermişim Dünyaya". It was the second most watched film in Turkey in 2018. Abdullah then starred in the film Bizim İçin: Şampiyon ("For Us: Champion"), which tells the life story of jockey Halis Karataş. Her role and the movie were widely appreciated by critics.

In 2022, Abdullah starred in the biographical film Bergen which became the 8th highest-grossing film of all time in Turkey gaining over 160 million tl. It was the most watched and highest grossing film in 2022 in Turkey.

In 2023, Abdullah starred in the film Bihter, an adaption of the 1900s Ottoman-era novel Aşk-ı Memnu.

=== Personal life ===
In December 2022, when one of her followers asked her if she had any chronic illnesses, she responded with, "I have a herniated cervical disc, my thyroid isn't working, I have Hashimoto's disease. There's a lesion in my brain. And my knee is in very bad shape too."

== Filmography ==
=== Film ===
Year	Title	Role	Director	Notes
2013	Kelebeğin Rüyası	Mediha	Yılmaz Erdoğan	Supporting role
2014	Bi Küçük Eylül Meselesi	Eylül	Kerem Deren	Leading role
2014	Unutursam Fısılda	Hatice / Ayperi	Çağan Irmak	Leading role
2015	Barbie in Rock'n Royals	Princess Courtney		Turkish dubbing
2016	Ekşi Elmalar	Muazzez	Yılmaz Erdoğan	Leading role
2018	Arif V 216	Ajda Pekkan	Kıvanç Baruönü	Supporting role
2018	Bizim İçin: Şampiyon	Begüm Atman / Karataş	Ahmet Katıksız	Leading role
2022	Bergen	Bergen	Caner Alper & Mehmet Binay	Leading role / Co-producer
2023	Bihter	Bihter Yöreoğlu	Caner Alper & Mehmet Binay	Leading role / Co-producer
2026	Soy	Basak	Maxime Alexandre	Leading role

=== Television ===
Year	Title	Role	Channel	Notes	Episodes
2010–2012	Öyle Bir Geçer Zaman Ki	Aylin Akarsu / Talaşoğlu	Kanal D	Supporting role	79
2014	Kurt Seyit ve Şura	Alexandra "Șura" Verjenskaya	Star TV	Leading role	21
2016–2017	Muhteşem Yüzyıl: Kösem	Princess Farya Bethlen	Fox	Leading role	22
2018	Gülizar	Gülizar	Kanal D	Leading role	10
2020–2021	Masumlar Apartmanı	İnci Özdemir / Derenoğlu	TRT 1	Leading role	37
2023	Kızılcık Şerbeti	Dilruba	Show TV	Guest star	2

== Discography ==
Year	Title	Project
2014	Eyvah; Nafile; Başka Güzel; Sevdim; Gel Ya Da Git; Bir Mazi Bin Hatıra	Unutursam Fısılda (Original Soundtrack)
2017	Haydi Gel içelim (Yüksek Sadakat cover); Paramparça (Teoman cover)	Rockuba
2018	Milyonzade (Ajda Pekkan cover); Boşvermişim Dünyaya (Ajda Pekkan cover)	Arif V 216 (Original Soundtrack)
2018	Değişik El; Biraz; Hüzün Dibi; Ben Seçtim Yolumu	Gülizar (Original Soundtrack)
2018	Bu Hangi Masaldı?	Single
2019	Sen Unutulacak Kadın Mısın? (featuring Erol Evgin)	Altın Düetler 2
2020	Eller Eller	Bepanthol commercial
2022	Bana Neler Vadettin; Dert Bende Dertman Sende; Kurtar Yarab; Yalan Dünya; Son Bir Defa; Benim İçin Üzülme; Seni Kalbimden Kovdum; Unutma Beni	Bergen (Original Soundtrack)

== Awards and nominations ==
Year	Award	Category	Project	Result
2011	2nd Antalya Television Awards	Best Supporting Actress	Öyle Bir Geçer Zaman Ki	Won
2012	3rd Antalya Television Awards	Best Supporting Actress	Öyle Bir Geçer Zaman Ki	Nominated
2013	18th Sadri Alışık Theatre and Cinema Actors Awards	Best Actress in a Supporting Role	Kelebeğin Rüyası	Won
2014	46th Cinema Writers Association Awards	Best Supporting Actress	Kelebeğin Rüyası	Won
2014	Elle Style Awards	Actress of the Year		Nominated
2015	13th YTÜ Stars of the Year Awards	Best Film Actress	Unutursam Fısılda	Won
2015	22nd ITU EMOS Success Awards	Actress Of The Year	Unutursam Fısılda	Nominated
2015	TurkMSIC Awards	Best Actress	Unutursam Fısılda	Won
2015	4th Istanbul Arel University Media and Art Awards	Most Praised Actress	Unutursam Fısılda	Won
2015	9th GSÜ The Bests Awards	Best TV/Cinema Actress	Unutursam Fısılda	Won
2015	47th Cinema Writers Association Awards	Best Actress	Unutursam Fısılda	Nominated
2015	10th Uludağ University Marconi Awards	Best Film Actress	Unutursam Fısılda	Won
2015	20th Sadri Alışık Theatre and Cinema Actors Awards	Best Film Actress	Unutursam Fısılda	Nominated
2015	21st MGD Golden Objective Awards	Best Film Actress	Unutursam Fısılda	Won
2015	KAL Fest Changemakers Awards	Changemaker Actress	Unutursam Fısılda	Won
2017	24th ITU EMOS Success Awards	TV Actress Of The Year	Muhteşem Yüzyıl: Kösem	Nominated
2017	3rd Turkey's Youth Awards	Best Film Actress	Ekşi Elmalar	Nominated
2017	22nd Sadri Alışık Theatre and Cinema Actors Awards	Special Jury Award	Ekşi Elmalar	Won
2019	51st Cinema Writers Association Awards	Best Actress	Bizim İçin Şampiyon	Nominated
2019	5th Turkey's Youth Awards	Best Film Actress	Bizim İçin Şampiyon	Nominated
2019	2nd Izmir International Film Festival	Best Actress	Bizim İçin Şampiyon	Nominated
	6th Turkey's Youth Awards	Best Film Actress	Bizim İçin Şampiyon	Nominated
2020	7th Golden Palm Awards	Cinema Actress of the Year	Bizim İçin Şampiyon	Won
2022	33rd Ankara Film Festival	The Fresh Breath in Cinema Award	Honorary Award	Won
2022	12th ITU Social Media Awards	Best Actress	Bergen	Nominated
2022	17th GSU The Bests Awards	Best TV/Cinema Actress	Bergen	Won
2023	21st YTU Stars of The Year Awards	Most Liked Film Actress of The Year	Bergen	Won
2023	55th Cinema Writers Association Award	Best Actress	Bergen	Won
2023	60th Antalya Golden Orange Film Festival	Achievement Award	Honorary Award	Won
2023	5th Izmir Film Festival	Best Cinema/ Film Actress	Bergen	Won
