= Bergen (film) =

2022 Turkish biographical film

- Theatrical release poster
- Directed by: Mehmet Binay; Caner Alper
- Written by: Sema Kaygusuz; Yıldız Bayazıt
- Produced by: Mine Şengöz
- Starring: Farah Zeynep Abdullah; Erdal Beşikçioğlu; Tilbe Saran
- Cinematography: Mirsad Herović
- Edited by: Erhan Özen
- Music by: Mazlum Çimen
- Distributed by: CJ ENM
- Release date: 4 March 2022
- Running time: 145 minutes
- Country: Turkey
- Language: Turkish

Bergen is a 2022 Turkish biographical film. The film stars Farah Zeynep Abdullah as lead singer Bergen, who has become one of the symbols of violence against women in Turkey.

== Cast ==
- Farah Zeynep Abdullah as Bergen
- Erdal Beşikçioğlu as Halis Serbest
- Tilbe Saran as Sabahat
- Şebnem Sönmez as Suna
- Nergis Öztürk as Nadire
- Ahmet Kayakesen as Abdullah
- Arif Pişkin as Selahattin

== Production ==
The filmmakers initially planned to shoot the movie in 2019, but this was delayed due to casting problems followed by the COVID-19 pandemic. At first, Serenay Sarikaya was accepted to play Bergen, but due to shooting delays, she decided not to be involved in the movie. Following Sarikaya's withdrawal, Farah Zeynep Abdullah accepted the role of Bergen. Production had to be completed in secret due to death threats against the producers.

The film was shot in Istanbul, Ankara and Mersin in the fall of 2021.

== Release ==
The film's release in Turkey earned over US$10 million. By 29 July, it had become the eight-highest grossing domestic feature film in the country. Its release throughout West Asia also found widespread success, earning US$4.8 million between 16 June and 22 July, and it was described as the most successful Turkish film in the region. Bergen was also the first Turkish movie to be released in Saudi Arabia.

Following its release, Halis Serbest, the murderer of Bergen, filed defamation lawsuits against the film's creators. In response to this and other threats, the opening gala in Istanbul had to be protected by riot police. The mayor of Kozan, where Serbest lives, banned showings of the film on the basis of being inappropriate for children; however, major Turkish cinema associations and unions condemned this decision and claimed it has actually been done to appease Serbest.

== Reception ==
In Turkey, the film was seen as an exploration and condemnation of violence against women and femicide in the country. This was partly attributed to purposeful decisions made in the film, such as refusing to show Bergen's murderer as a "fully realised character" but rather a stand-in for the perpetrators of patriarchal violence, with his name only being shown once during the end credits. Kemal Kılıçdaroğlu, the leader of the main opposition Republican People's Party, stated that "Everyone who rejects violence against women must watch this film" and used it to advocate for Turkey's return to the Istanbul Convention.
