= Mersin Interfaith Cemetery =

Burial ground in Mersin, Turkey

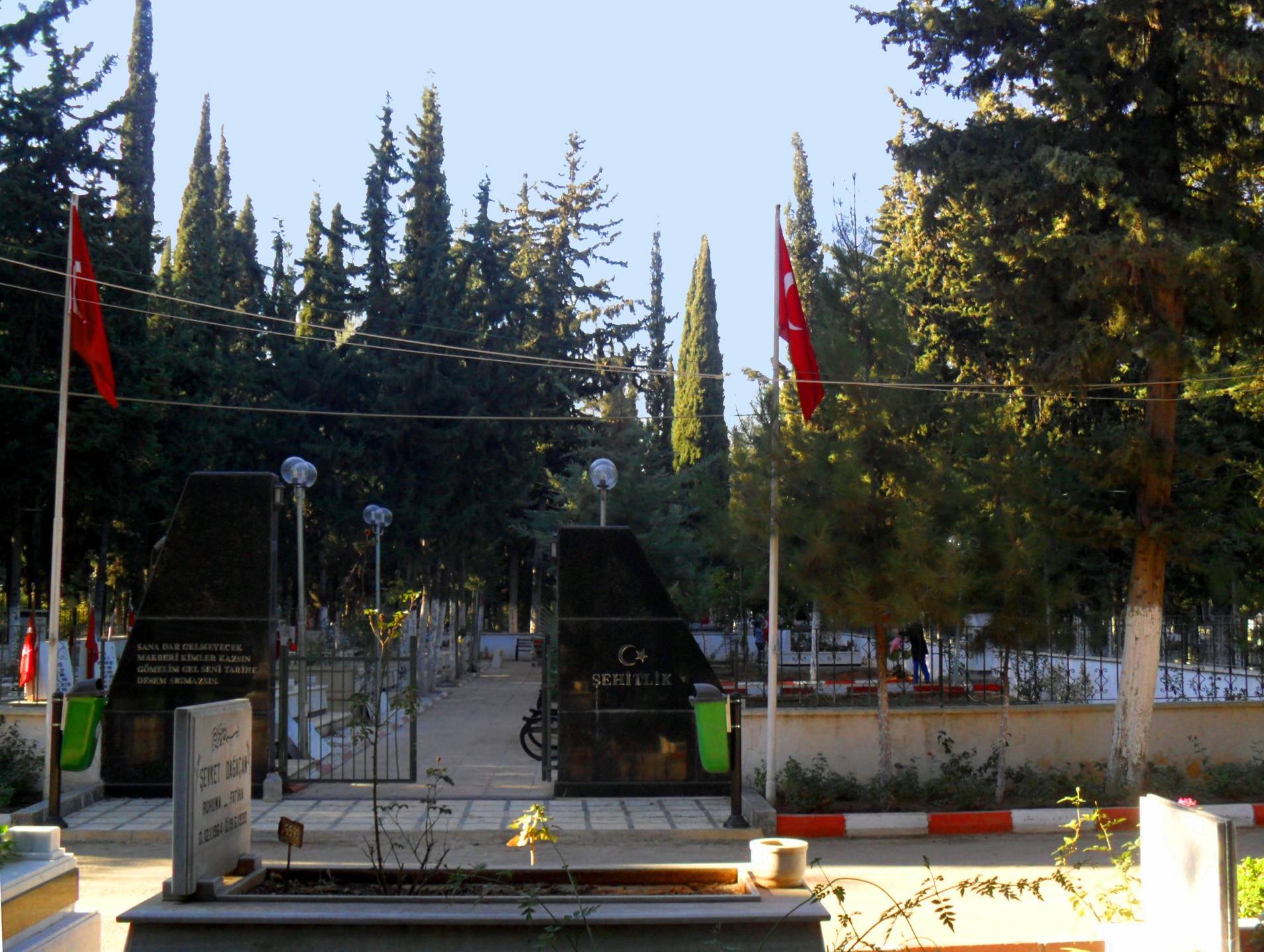
- Memorial section in Mersin Interfaith Cemetery
- Interactive map of Mersin Interfaith Cemetery

Details
- Established: 1938
- Location: Toroslar, Mersin
- Country: Turkey
- Coordinates: 36°49′07″N 34°36′23″E
- Owned by: Mersin Metropolitan Municipality
- Size: 360 decares (360,000 m^{2})
- No. of graves: 75,000

Mersin Interfaith Cemetery (Turkish: Mersin Şehir Mezarlığı, also called Mersin Asri Cemetery and Akbelen Cemetery), is a burial ground in Mersin, Turkey. It is notable for being a common cemetery of all religions and includes graves of Muslims, Christians, and Jews.

== Geography ==
The rectangular cemetery is located in the Yusuf Kılıç neighborhood, one of the northernmost neighborhoods of Mersin. The bird's flight distance to the Mediterranean coast (hence the city center) is 3.6 kilometres (2.2 mi). Administratively, the cemetery is part of the Toroslar Municipality. Akbelen Boulevard, which connects the city center to the Toros Mountains, is to the west and Okan Merzeci Boulevard, which is a ring road of Mersin, is to the south of the cemetery. The main gate is on the south wall. The total area of the cemetery is about 360 decares (360,000 m^{2}), including a "soldiers-memorial cemetery" (Turkish: şehitlik).

== History ==
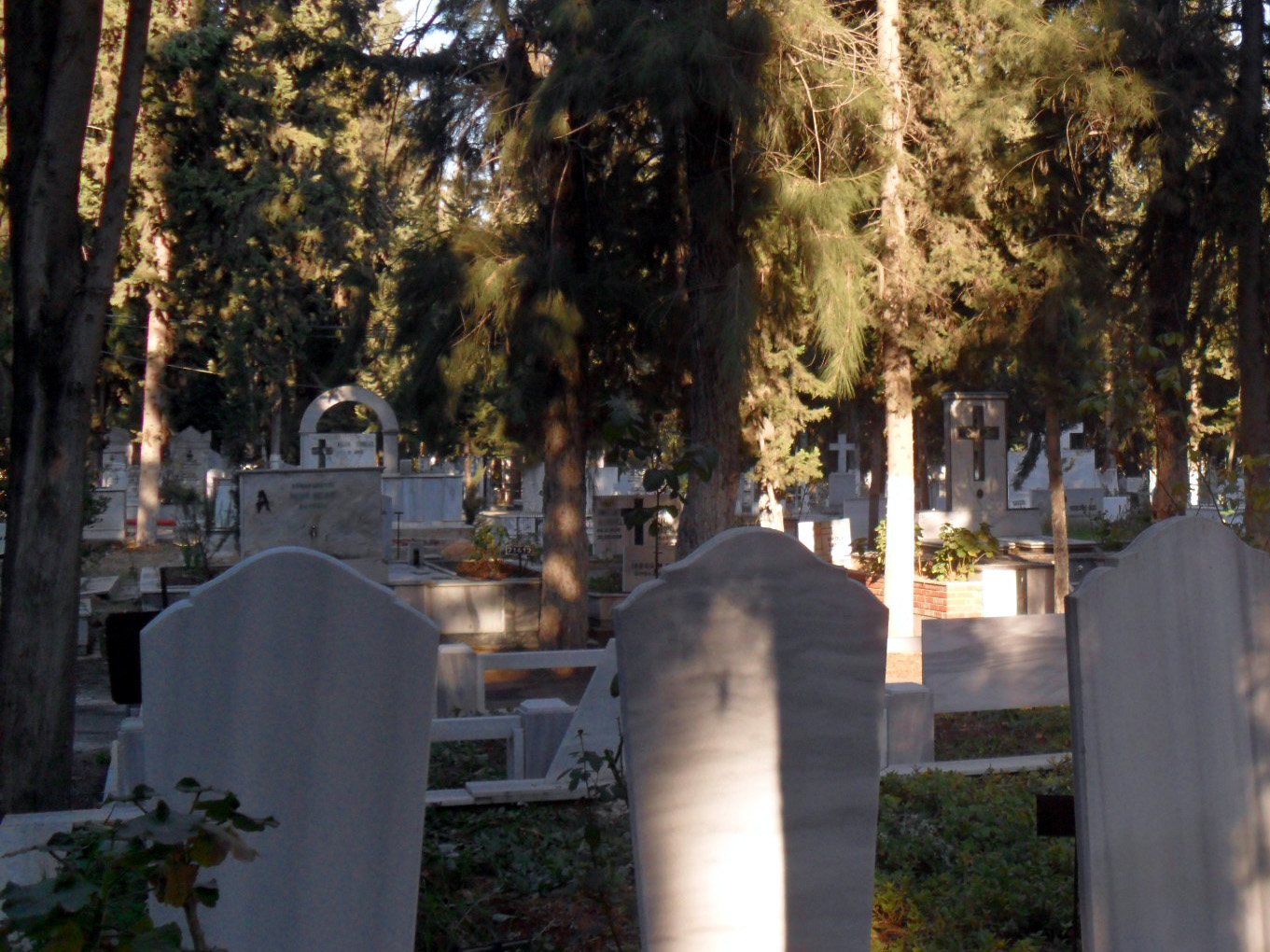
Muslim and Christian graves in Mersin Interfaith Cemetery

Until the 1930s there were many small cemeteries in the urban fabric of Mersin. But as the city grew, establishing a new and large cemetery became one of the priorities of the municipality. Mayor Mithat Toroğlu assigned German architect Hermann Jansen to prepare a city plan for Mersin. In 1938 the Mersin cemetery was established in one of the locations that Jansen proposed.

The cemetery originally measured 260 decares (0.26 km^{2}; 0.10 sq mi) and was located outside the city's residential area. Later the grounds were expanded. Toroğlu initiated a project of transferring corpses to the new cemetery, which was used up until the 2010s. There are now about 75,000 graves in the cemetery. As of 2010, the cemetery is completely filled and new quarters of the city have been established around the cemetery. The municipality has established new cemeteries that are farther away from the city center.

== Interfaith characteristics ==
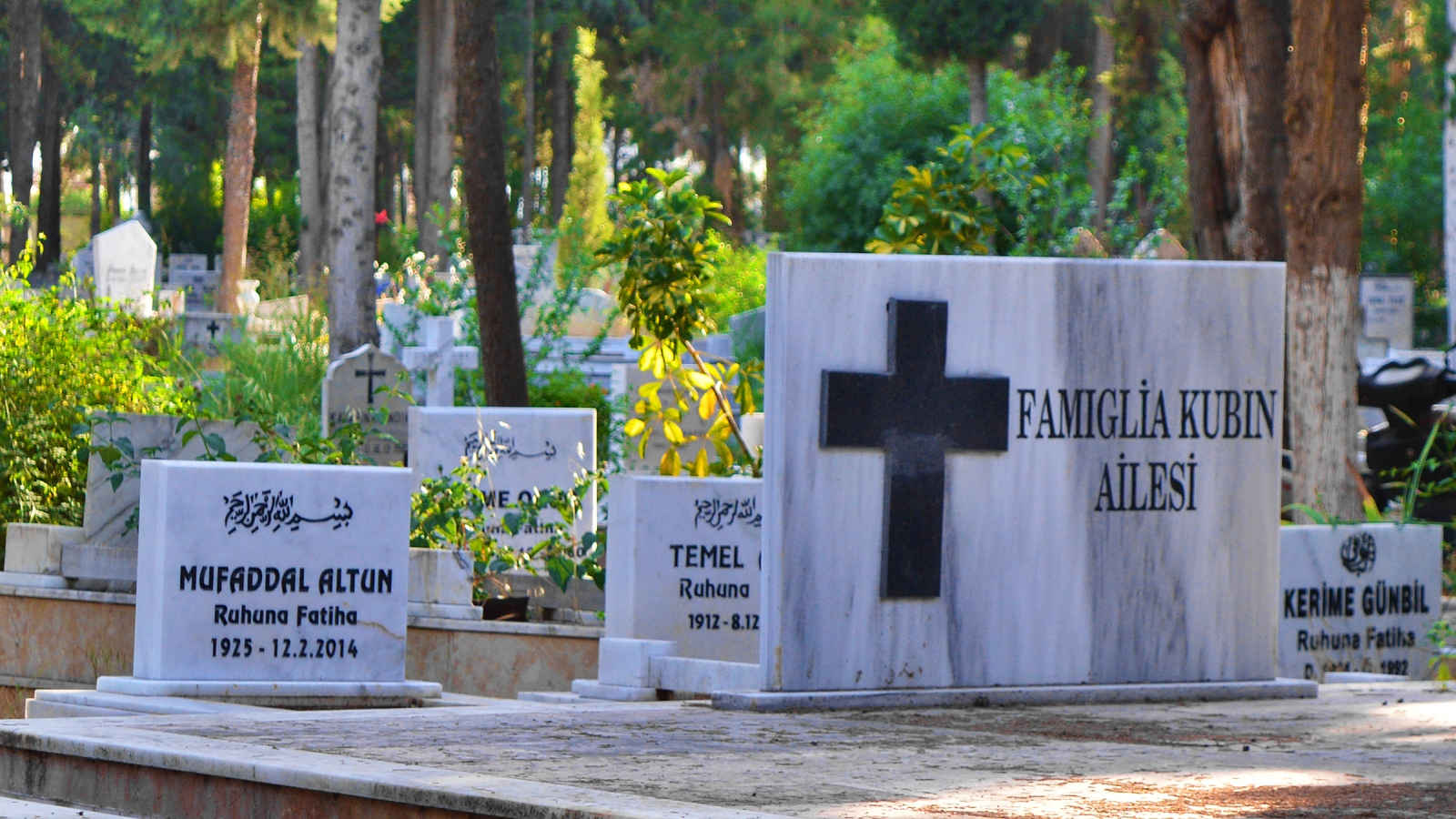
View of the graves.

In Turkey all religions traditionally use many different cemeteries for their burials. Mersin City Cemetery is an exception. While different religions were initially separated by section, spousal burials brought different religions into the same plot (newspaper columnist Özdemir İnce notes that one family plot has a Muslim man and Jewish woman) and gradually the sections opened to all religions. Approximately 5,000 of the graves in the cemetery are of Christians and Jews. On 26 February 1998 the cemetery was included in the List of Cultural Property of the Ministry of Culture.

İnce recalls that in 2003, both Christian priests and Muslim hocas prayed during the burial ceremony of Hanri Atat, a celebrity of Mersin. In 1999, Lina Nasif, a painter and a citizen of Mersin, organized an annual multi-religion ceremony, called a "traditional praying ceremony" (Turkish: geleneksel dua töreni), to stress and preserve the characteristics of the cemetery. During the ceremony, hocas and priests pray and give speeches on peace. Hymns are sung in several languages. In a 2009 ceremony, Mersin mayor Macit Özcan stressed that the deceased of different religions all lay in peace and everybody should do his/her best to keep this feature of the cemetery.

== Notable persons buried at Mersin Interfaith Cemetery ==
- Konca Kuris (1960–1999), Muslim Turkish feminist writer
- Ahmet Mersinli (1914–1979), Turkish sports wrestler
- Nevit Kodallı (1925–2009), Turkish composer
- Özgecan Aslan, Mersin University psychology student
- Mithat Toroğlu, former mayor of Mersin
- Leaders of the Kuva-yi Milliye Turkish militia forces during the Turkish War of Independence
- Bergen (singer) (1959-1989), Turkish singer
