= Şükran Ovalı =

Turkish actress (born 1985)

- Born: Şükran Pınar Ovalı; 1 April 1985 (age 41); İzmir, Turkey
- Occupation: Actress
- Years active: 2007–present
- Spouse: Caner Erkin (m. 2017)
- Children: 1

Şükran Pınar Ovalı (born 1 April 1985) is a Turkish actress.

== Life and career ==
Ovalı was born in the Eşrefpaşa district of İzmir. Her grandfather is of Kosovo descent. She spent most of her childhood in Bahçelievler, İzmir. After studying at Mustafa Urcan Primary School and Fevzi Çakmak Secondary School, she finished her high school education at Göztepe Selma Yiğit Alp High School, after which she went to Istanbul. She studied acting at Müjdat Gezen Art Center.

She made her television debut with the series Sırlar Dünyası, after which she appeared in various TV series. In 2006, she had her first cinematic experience with a role in the movie Pars: Kiraz Operasyonu. Her breakthrough came with fantasy child series Bez Bebek. She also had a role in the period drama series Kötü Yol, based on a classic novel. Alongside Şükrü Özyıldız, she appeared in the series Ekşi Elmalar and Şeref Meselesi.

== Filmography ==
=== Series ===
Streaming series
Year	Title	Role	Notes
2021	Şeref Bey	Suna	Supporting role
2024	Erşan Kuneri	Kumsal	Leading role
Television series
Year	Title	Role	Notes
2006	Ezo Gelin	Gülden	Joined
2007	Vazgeç Gönlüm	Cemile	Joined
2007	Bez Bebek	Merve	Supporting role
2008	Aşk Yakar		Joined
2009	Kahramanlar	Ayşe	Joined
2009	Bir Bulut Olsam	Bahar	Joined
2010	Behzat Ç. Bir Ankara Polisiyesi	Aslı-Ayla	Guest appearance
2011	Reis	Nazlı	Leading role
2012	Kötü Yol	Nuran Öğütçü	Leading role
2012	Leyla ile Mecnun	Sena	Guest appearance
2013	Avrupa Avrupa	Melisa	Joined
2014	Cinayet	Umay Abalı	Leading role
2014–2015	Şeref Meselesi	Derya	Leading role
2016	Paramparça	Ayşe	Joined
2016	Familya	Ezgi Alagöz	Leading role
2017–2018	Vatanım Sensin	Seher	Joined
2018	Ufak Tefek Cinayetler	Şebnem Aksak	Joined
2020	Menajerimi Ara	Herself	Guest appearance
2022–2023	Family Secrets	Derya İhdal	Joined
2024	Kalpazan	Canan	Leading role

=== Film ===
Film
Year	Title	Role	Notes
2006	Pars: Kiraz Operasyonu	Zeynep	Supporting role
2008	Alia	İpek	Supporting role
2008	Cin Geçidi	Pınar	Short film
2009	Ev	Vildan	Leading role
2011	Nar	-	Supporting role
2015	Yeni Dünya	Melek	Leading role
2016	Şeytan Tüyü	Neşe	Leading role
2016	Ekşi Elmalar	Safiye	Leading role
2017	Poyraz Karayel: Küresel Sermaye	Yasemin	Leading role
2022	Hazine	Zehra	Leading role
2022	Kal		Leading role
2023	Cenazemize Hoş Geldiniz	Arzu	Leading role

== Awards ==
- 22nd Sadri Alışık Theatre and Cinema Awards - Selection Committee Special Award (Ekşi Elmalar)
