= Sour Apples =

- Directed by: Yılmaz Erdoğan
- Starring: Farah Zeynep Abdullah; Yılmaz Erdoğan
- Release date: 27 October 2016
- Running time: 1h 54min
- Country: Turkey
- Language: Turkish

Sour Apples (Turkish: Ekşi Elmalar) is a 2016 Turkish drama film directed by Yilmaz Erdogan.

== Cast ==
- Farah Zeynep Abdullah - Muazzez
- Yılmaz Erdoğan - Aziz Özay
- Songül Öden - Türkan Özay
- Şükran Ovalı - Safiye Özay
