= Bergen (singer) =

Turkish singer (1958–1989)

- Bergen, c. 1987

Background information
- Also known as: Beauty; Woman of Pains; Queen of Arabesque
- Born: Belgin Sarılmışer; 15 July 1958; Mersin, Turkey
- Died: 14 August 1989 (aged 31) Pozantı, Adana, Turkey
- Genres: Arabesque, fantezi
- Occupations: Singer, actress
- Years active: 1977–1989
- Labels: Yaşar Kekeva, Atlas
- Spouse: Halis Serbest (m. 1982; div. 1989)

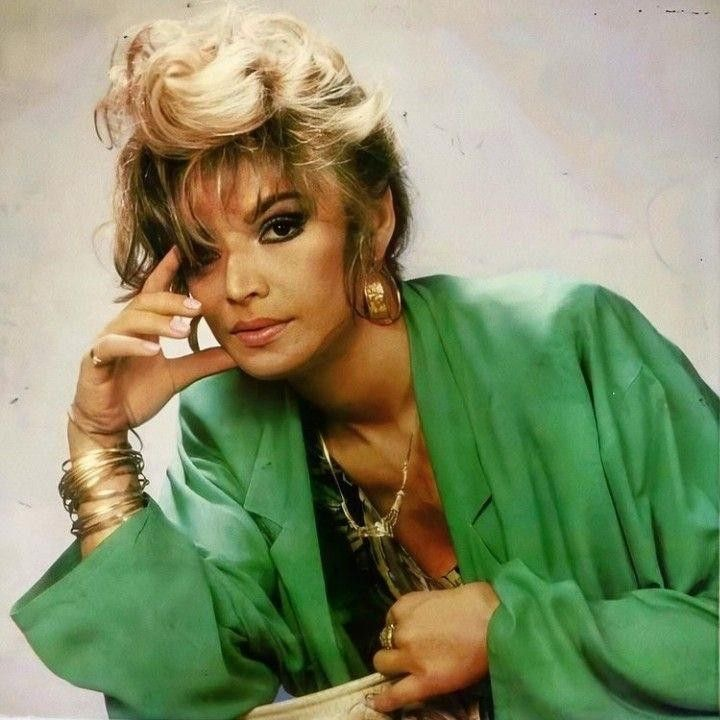
Belgin Sarılmışer in 1986

Bergen (born Belgin Sarılmışer; 15 July 1958 – 14 August 1989) was a Turkish singer. She was one of the most prominent Arabesque music stars of Turkey in the 1980s, breaking sales records with her fourth studio album, Acıların Kadını ("Woman of Pains").

She has become a symbol and face of violence against women in Turkey with her life and death. Her husband, Halis Serbest, threw nitric acid on her face, blinding her right eye. She continued singing and covered her blind eye with her long hair. She was murdered by Serbest, whom she had divorced after releasing several successful albums.

Bergen, a biographical film based on her life, premiered in 2022.

== Life and career ==
=== Early life and career beginnings ===
Belgin Sarılmışer was born on 15 July 1958 in Mersin, Turkey, the youngest of seven children. After her parents divorced, she moved to Ankara with her mother.

She completed primary education at Yenimahalle Yunus Emre Primary School, where she sang and played mandolin. Teachers encouraged her to study at the conservatory after graduation. After completing exams for Ankara State Conservatory, she placed first in the piano department and went on to study piano and cello for two years. She dropped out of school due to financial difficulties and worked as a civil servant in the PTT, after officially raising her age with a court decision.

A claim that she married in 1977 and had a child was denied by her family.

In 1977, she impressed the owner of the Feyman Night Club in Ankara, İlhan Feyman, when her friends persuaded her to take to the stage there. She accepted his offer of work, and sang Turkish classical music, Turkish pop, and arrangement pieces accompanied by the Grup Locomotive orchestra. She took the stage name Bergen after the Norwegian city, having seen it on a newspaper. She left Feyman Night Club after a year and accepted the offer of a car from Kuyubaşı Club in Adana in exchange for 8 months singing. The car was taken back at the end of the job and she was left in debt.

In 1979, she started performing as an artist in Ankara Başkent Casino with Bülent Ersoy, İbrahim Tatlıses and Müjde Ar.

In 1981, Bergen travelled on business to Adana where she met Halis Serbest. Every night he sent flowers and watched her from the front table at the club where she worked. Through his stubborn insistence she agreed to marry him. Bergen ended the relationship when it transpired Serbest was already married and had three children.

After being subjected to violence by Serbest many times, Bergen returned to the stage in the nightclubs of Ankara. In 1982, she released the album Şikayetim Var (I have a complaint). Saying that she fell in love with Serbest despite his violence, she officially married him on January 9, 1982. On October 31 that year, someone threw nitric acid in her face. The assailant had been paid to do so by Serbest. Bergen lost her right eye and most of her body was burned. She said of the incident:

"Towards the end of our relationship, I found a woman's panties at home. That's when I was completely devastated and fled from Adana to Ankara. As soon as he found out that I had escaped, he followed me. Finally, he found me in a hostel in Izmir. He was threatening me because I didn't give heed. He would say "I will throw acid on your face". But I didn't believe it.

=== Nitric acid attack ===
Halis Serbest gave 500 thousand liras to a hired killer and sent him to İzmir. On the night of October 31, 1982, at the gate of the New York pavilion in Alsancak, Bergen was about to get into a taxi with her mother when the attacker threw a bucket of nitric acid on Bergen. Bergen later said:

"In that moment, I lost sight in both my eyes. I was hardly aware of anything as I was a little drunk. I could only hear screams. "Get her to the water fountain" they said at one point. But the water was cut off. The water flowed like a thin pencil. They tore my clothes and wrapped me with clean ones. At that moment, everything was dark, I couldn't see anything, I couldn't even open my eyes. A short time later, a police car arrived. They took me to Ege University Hospital. I stayed in the hospital for 45 days, because of my wounds."

Her mother said:

"Two years ago, he abducted my daughter. I told Bergen many times that she should not marry this man who is a punk, that he could not make her happy. But she said, "Once my name is on people's lips with him, I can't go back." She didn't listen. My daughter, who sang Turkish music in nightclubs, became a sought-after artist in a short time with her voice. My son-in-law, who was jealous of Bergen's success, was creating a disturbance and fighting every day. Finally, thinking that this marriage would not work anymore, she decided to divorce. Despite this, he did not give up on my daughter. He was constantly threatening her, saying, "I won't leave you to anyone else."

Bergen was seriously injured. Renowned plastic surgeon Onur Erol followed the event in the press and volunteered his help.

Serbest was caught after two months desertion and sentenced to 13 years prison. Having called the hospital after the attack, he cried and lied that he had nothing to do with the incident.

=== Comeback and albums ===
After treatment, and with the persuasion of composer Cengiz Özşeker, Bergen returned to the stage in Özşeker's club. In 1983, Bergen entered the studio in İzmir with Özşeker and recorded the album Kardeşiz Kader, consisting of 12 songs, with a limited budget. Invited to Istanbul by Yaşar Kekeva, owner of Yaşar Records, Bergen met with music lovers in Istanbul for the first time on 29 March 1985. She recorded the album İnsan Severse in 1985 under the musical direction of Burhan Bayar, and recorded the album Acıların Kadını (Woman of Sorrows) in late 1986, which has sold over 1 million copies and gained Bergen the Golden Record and Golden Cassette awards in 1987 with the title of "The Best Selling Arabesque Female Artist of the Year 1986".

Bergen made her acting debut in 1987 with the movie "Woman of Pain", written and directed by Ülkü Erakalın. She was stabbed at a concert in Adana by a photographer of the club, and recovered from minor injuries after outpatient treatment. Having left the stage for a while, she released the albums "Burn Him Too God", Sevgimin Bedeli and İstemiyorum under the musical direction of Selami Şahin, Özer Şenay and Cengiz Tekin.

Bergen sent money to Serbest while he was in prison and exchanged letters with him. When he was released in 1988 she left her music and cinema life behind before divorcing him in April 1989. Returning to the stage in June that year, she presented her last album, Yıllar Affetmez.

Regarding her post-prison reconciliation with Serbest, her cousin said:

"She was afraid because his men were after her. How many times she tried to leave, he raided my house. Bergen was hiding in my house. He raided my house with the men we call the mafia in Mersin. He said, 'If you make a wrong move, I will shoot the gun, tell me where she is.' Bergen was hiding under the bed in my house. "

In an interview shortly before Serbest was released from prison, Bergen said:

"I have little feelings. It hurts to imagine the prison and him. Sometimes I hate him. The years that were hard for me... I am undecided yet.

== Death and legacy ==
In 1989 Bergen went to Adana to promote Yıllar Affetmez, where she was shot dead by Serbest. Her mother was also injured in the attack. Bergen was buried in the Mersin Interfaith Cemetery in her hometown, where her grave is open to visitors.

Serbest fled abroad and was caught in Germany. He was sentenced to 15 years prison, reduced to 3 years for good behavior. Considering his 16-month detention period in Germany and Turkey, he was sentenced to seven months in prison.

Her mother said about the attack:

"Bergen had a concert in Kayseri, Halis came in front of the hotel where we stay and threatened, 'If you don't come back to me, I will kill you all'. Since we heard these threats so often, we didn't pay much attention... My daughter turned her back to the flowers in the back and said, 'It's all over now, I won't go back to you!' Hearing this word, he took out a pistol from his waistband. I shouted as loud as I could and asked for help. This time he aimed the gun at me to silence me and fired. They left us in blood and got in the car with his half-brother and ran away."

Regarding his short sentence, Serbest said: "After committing the Bergen murder, I spent less time in prison; I stayed in prison for 7 months. Now, in underdeveloped countries, no matter what country it is, it's over if you're strong," he said, and claimed that his main target was Bergen's mother.

Bergen's sister said: "After that pain, my mother buried herself in the grave. Then she always wore black; both at the wedding and at the feast... With Belgin's death, my mother died too. My mother was talking to herself. Belgin loved coffee very much. After my sister passed away, my mother made two Turkish coffees every morning, talked to Belgin and drank her coffee. She used to pray until the evening in my sister's room covered with her posters. She used to say, "My daughter is afraid of loneliness and the dark". We used to sit in the cemetery with my mother until the morning."

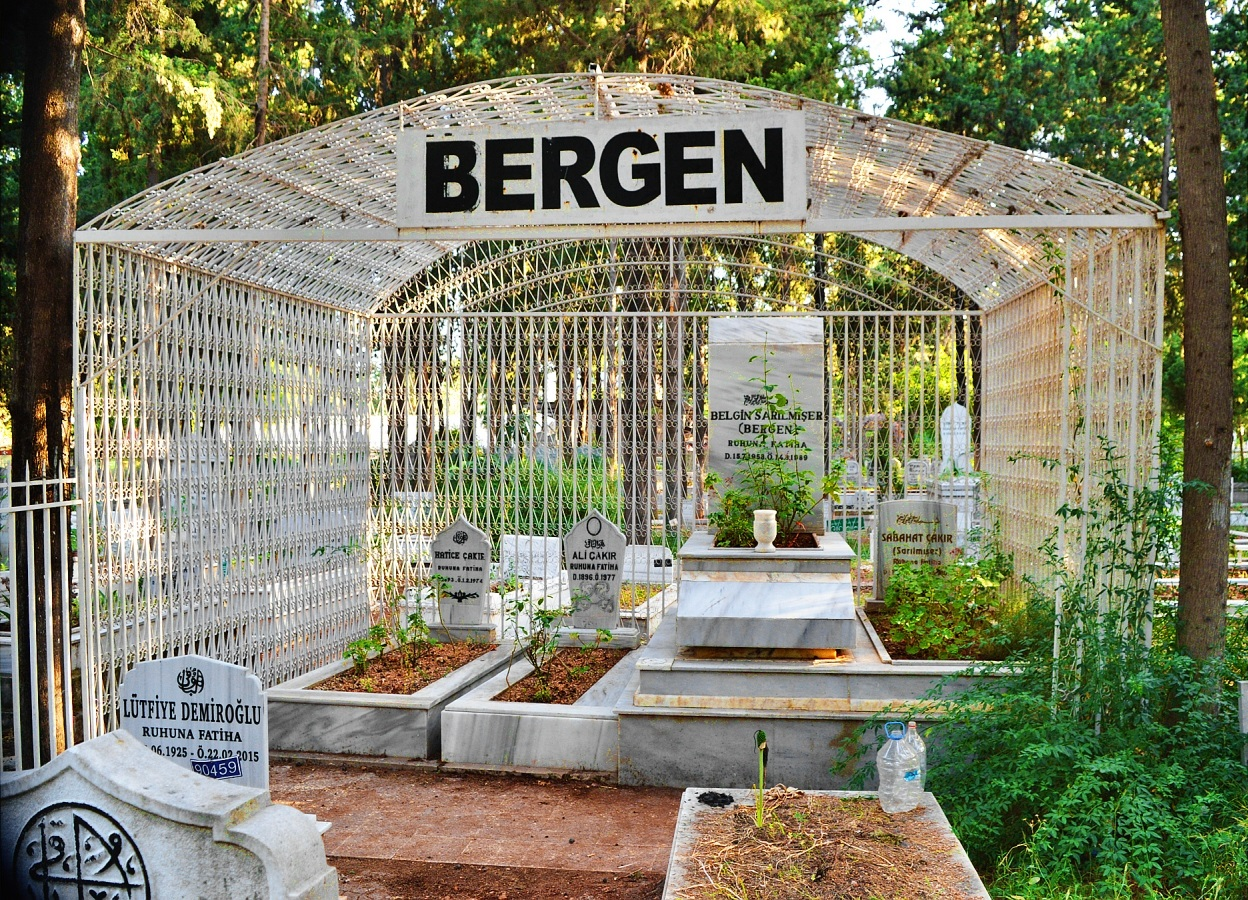
Grave of Bergen

Bergen's grave is protected by a 6-lock cage due to Serbest's threats, detailed by Bergen's sister: "32 years ago, that man, before he killed Belgin, used to call at 2 in the morning and say, "I will not leave her bones to you all, I will kill her." My mother had that cage built because of that."

In 2018, Serbest was charged with sexual abuse of four children.

The 2022 biopic Bergen stars Farah Zeynep Abdullah in the title role.

== Albums ==
Year	Album	Formats and notes
1982	Şikayetim Var	LP, MC (Reissued in 1986)
1983	Kardeşiz Kader	MC (Reissued in 1985 and 1990)
1985	İnsan Severse	MC (Reissued as CD in 1999)
1986	Acıların Kadını	LP, MC (Reissued as CD in 1999)
1987	Onu da Yak Tanrım	LP, MC (Reissued as CD in 1999)
1988	Sevgimin Bedeli	MC (Reissued as CD in 1999)
1988	İstemiyorum	LP, MC (Reissued as CD in 1999)
1989	Yıllar Affetmez	MC (Her latest album that was released during her lifetime. Reissued as CD in 1999)
1990	Giden Gençliğim	MC (Includes the songs that were never released before. Reissued as CD in 1999)
1990	Garibin Çilesi Mezarda Biter	MC (Includes songs that were never released before. Reissued as CD in 1999)
1991	Son Ağlayışım	MC, CD (Includes songs that were never released before.)
