= Çamalan =

- Neighbourhood
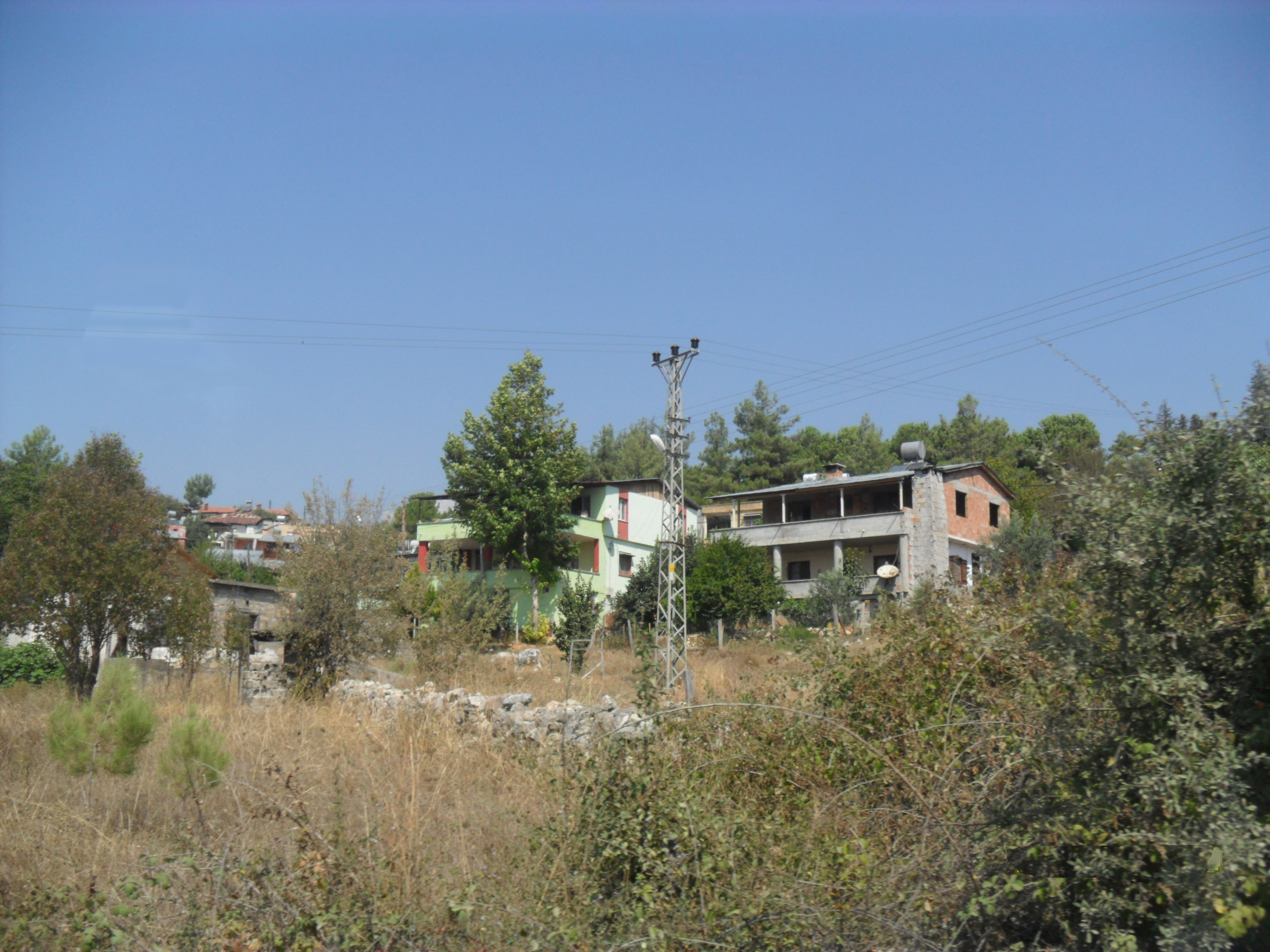

- Location within Turkey
- Coordinates: 37°12′00″N 34°48′19″E
- Country: Turkey
- Province: Mersin
- District: Tarsus
- Elevation: 750 m (2,460 ft)
- Population (2022): 266
- Time zone: UTC+3 (TRT)
- Area code: 0324

Çamalan is a neighbourhood in the municipality and district of Tarsus, Mersin Province, Turkey. Its population is 266 (2022). It is in the Taurus Mountains and to the west of Turkish state highway D.400. The village is inhabited by Tahtacı.

There is a German cemetery from World War I in the village, which is located 40 kilometres (25 mi) away from Tarsus and 67 kilometres (42 mi) away from Mersin. The village was founded in the 16th century by Turkmens of the Alevi sect. They escaped from the harsh treatment of the Ottoman sultan Selim I to the forests of the mountainous area for concealment. Their main economic activity was forestry, and they were called tahtacı ("woodman"). Nowadays, however, the majority of the village population is retired people from the cities in the Çukurova plains (Cilicia of the antiquity).
